= Brazil at the 2023 Pan American Games =

- IOC code: BRA
- NOC: Brazilian Olympic Committee

in Santiago, Chile 20 October 2023 – 5 November 2023
- Competitors: 630 in 40 sports
- Flag bearers (opening): Fernando Scheffer & Luisa Stefani
- Flag bearers (closing): Hugo Calderano & Nicole Pircio
- Medals Ranked 2nd: Gold 66 Silver 73 Bronze 66 Total 205

Pan American Games appearances (overview)
- 1951; 1955; 1959; 1963; 1967; 1971; 1975; 1979; 1983; 1987; 1991; 1995; 1999; 2003; 2007; 2011; 2015; 2019; 2023; 2027

Brazil competed at the 2023 Pan American Games in Santiago, Chile from 20 October to 5 November 2023.

Racquetball and squash competitions were the only sports without Brazilian representation at these games. With this, the delegation sent to represent Brazil, made up of 619 athletes, broke the record as the largest ever sent abroad in a sporting competition, 29 more than the record reached in 2015 Pan American Games, where 590 represented the country.

Olympic medalists in 2020 Summer Olympics, the swimmer Fernando Scheffer and tennis player Luisa Stefani were the country's flagbearers during the opening ceremony. Meanwhile, table tennis player Hugo Calderano and rhythmic gymnast Nicole Pircio were the country's flagbearers during the closing ceremony.

For the first time in the history of the Pan American Games, Brazil took the lead in the medal table for a few minutes. The feat took place shortly after Rayssa Leal won the gold medal and Pâmela Rosa won the silver in women's street skateboarding, as a discipline of roller sports. At the end of the Pan, Brazil finished second in a row in the medals table, surpassing the Lima 2019 record with 66 gold medals, 73 silver medals and 66 bronze medals, with the majority of medals won by women.

== Medalists ==
The following Brazilian competitors won medals at the games. In the by discipline sections below, medalists' names are bolded.

Medal	Name	Sport	Event	Date
Gold	Rayssa Leal	Roller sports	Women's street skateboarding	October 21
Gold	Guilherme Costa	Swimming	Men's 400 metre freestyle	October 21
Gold	Lucas Rabelo	Roller sports	Men's street skateboarding	October 21
Gold	Guilherme Caribé; Marcelo Chierighini; Victor Alcará; Felipe Ribeiro; Breno Correia	Swimming	Men's 4 × 100 metre freestyle relay	October 21
Gold	Guilherme Caribé; Marcelo Chierighini; Ana Carolina Vieira; Stephanie Balduccini; Felipe Ribeiro; Victor Alcará; Lorrane Ferreira; Nathalia Almeida	Swimming	Mixed 4 × 100 metre freestyle relay	October 22
Gold	Guilherme Caribé	Swimming	Men's 100 metre freestyle	October 23
Gold	Guilherme Costa	Swimming	Men's 800 metre freestyle	October 23
Gold	Murilo Sartori; Breno Correia; Fernando Scheffer; Guilherme Costa; Luiz Altamir Melo; Leonardo Coelho; Felipe Ribeiro	Swimming	Men's 4 × 200 metre freestyle relay	October 24
Gold	Rebeca Andrade	Gymnastics	Women's vault	October 24
Gold	Paulo Ricardo Melo; Edival Pontes; Maicon Andrade	Taekwondo	Men's kyorugi team	October 24
Gold	Lucas Verthein	Rowing	Men's single sculls	October 25
Gold	Guilherme Costa	Swimming	Men's 1500 metre freestyle	October 25
Gold	Rebeca Andrade	Gymnastics	Women's balance beam	October 25
Gold	Arthur Nory	Gymnastics	Men's horizontal bar	October 25
Gold	Beatriz Ferreira	Boxing	Women's 60 kg	October 27
Gold	Caroline Almeida	Boxing	Women's 50 kg	October 27
Gold	Jucielen Romeu	Boxing	Women's 57 kg	October 27
Gold	Bárbara Santos	Boxing	Women's 66 kg	October 27
Gold	Ana Patrícia Ramos; Eduarda Lisboa	Beach volleyball	Women's tournament	October 27
Gold	André Stein; George Wanderley	Beach volleyball	Men's tournament	October 27
Gold	Alexia Nascimento	Judo	Women's 48 kg	October 28
Gold	Michel Augusto	Judo	Men's 60 kg	October 28
Gold	Larissa Pimenta	Judo	Women's 52 kg	October 28
Gold	Rafaela Silva	Judo	Women's 57 kg	October 28
Gold	Laura Pigossi; Luisa Stefani	Tennis	Women's doubles	October 28
Gold	Gustavo Heide; Marcelo Demoliner	Tennis	Men's doubles	October 28
Gold	Ana Sátila	Canoeing	Women's slalom C-1	October 29
Gold	Gabriel Falcão	Judo	Men's 73 kg	October 29
Gold	Guilherme Mapelli	Canoeing	Men's kayak cross	October 29
Gold	Guilherme Schimidt	Judo	Men's 81 kg	October 29
Gold	Ana Sátila	Canoeing	Women's kayak cross	October 29
Gold	Laura Pigossi	Tennis	Women's singles	October 29
Gold	Brazil women's national basketball team: Aline Moura; Ana Beatriz Oliveira; Carina dos Santos; Débora Costa; Emanuely de Oliveira; Érika de Souza; Gabriela Soares; Leila Zabani; Licinara Bispo; Maria Albiero; Mariana Dias; Vanessa Sassá	Basketball	Women's tournament	October 29
Gold	Brazil women's national handball team: Adriana Cardoso; Ana Paula Belo; Bruna de Paula; Francielle da Rocha; Gabriela Moreschi; Giulia Guarieiro; Jhennifer Lopes; Larissa Araújo; Marcela Arounian; Mariana Costa; Mariane Fernándes; Patrícia Matieli; Renata Arruda; Tamires Morena	Handball	Women's tournament	October 29
Gold	Tatiana Weston-Webb	Surfing	Women's shortboard	October 30
Gold	Samanta Soares	Judo	Women's 78 kg	October 30
Gold	Izabela da Silva	Athletics	Women's discus throw	October 30
Gold	Hugo Calderano	Table tennis	Men's singles	November 1
Gold	Eduardo de Deus	Athletics	Men's 110 metres hurdles	November 1
Gold	Lucas Conceição	Athletics	Men's 400 metres	November 1
Gold	Miguel Hidalgo	Triathlon	Men's individual	November 2
Gold	Giullia Penalber	Wrestling	Women's freestyle 57 kg	November 2
Gold	Bárbara Domingos	Gymnastics	Women's rhythmic individual all-around	November 2
Gold	Bárbara Urquiza; Gabriella Coradine; Victória Borges; Giovanna Oliveira; Nicole Pircio	Gymnastics	Women's rhythmic group all-around	November 2
Gold	Renan Gallina	Athletics	Men's 200 metres	November 2
Gold	Rodrigo do Nascimento; Felipe Bardi; Erik Cardoso; Renan Gallina	Athletics	Men's 4 × 100 metres relay	November 2
Gold	Maria Eduarda Alexandre	Gymnastics	Women's rhythmic individual hoop	November 3
Gold	Bárbara Domingos	Gymnastics	Women's rhythmic individual ball	November 3
Gold	Bruno Lobo	Sailing	Men's kite	November 3
Gold	Martine Grael; Kahena Kunze	Sailing	49erFX	November 3
Gold	Stephan Barcha	Equestrian	Individual jumping	November 3
Gold	Mateus Isaac	Sailing	Men's IQFoil	November 3
Gold	Laís Nunes	Wrestling	Women's freestyle 62 kg	November 3
Gold	Darlan Romani	Athletics	Men's shot put	November 3
Gold	Bárbara Urquiza; Gabriella Coradine; Victória Borges; Giovanna Oliveira; Nicole Pircio	Gymnastics	Women's rhythmic group 5 hoops	November 3
Gold	Miguel Hidalgo; Djenyfer Arnold; Manoel Messias; Vittória Lopes	Triathlon	Mixed relay	November 4
Gold	Maria Eduarda Alexandre	Gymnastics	Women's rhythmic individual club	November 4
Gold	Bárbara Domingos	Gymnastics	Women's rhythmic individual ribbon	November 4
Gold	Nathalie Moellhausen; Amanda Simeão; Victória Vizeu	Fencing	Women's team épée	November 4
Gold	Bárbara Urquiza; Gabriella Coradine; Victória Borges; Giovanna Oliveira; Nicole Pircio	Gymnastics	Women's rhythmic group 3 ribbons + 2 balls	November 4
Gold	Erik Medziukevicius	Roller sports	Men's free skating	November 4
Gold	Lucas Carvalho; Matheus Lima; Douglas Hernandes; Lucas Conceição	Athletics	Men's 4 × 400 metres relay	November 4
Gold	Brazil men's national volleyball team: Adriano Xavier; Darlan Souza; Felipe Roque; Henrique Honorato; Judson Nunes; Lukas Bergmann; Maicon França; Maique Nascimento; Matheus Gonçalves; Otávio Pinto; Thiago Veloso; Thiery Nascimento	Volleyball	Men's tournament	November 4
Gold	Brazil national under-23 football team: Andrew Ventura; Arthur Chaves; Gabriel Pirani; Guilherme Biro; Gustavo Martins; Igor Jesus; Kaio César; Lucas Figueiredo; Marquinhos Alencar; Matheus Dias; Matheus Donelli; Matheus Miranda; Matheus Nascimento; Michel Augusto; Mycael Moreira; Patryck Lanza; Ronald Falkoski; Thauan Lara	Football	Men's tournament	November 4
Gold	Bárbara Rodrigues	Karate	Women's 68 kg	November 5
Gold	Hugo Calderano; Vitor Ishiy; Eric Jouti	Table tennis	Men's team	November 5
Silver	Pâmela Rosa	Roller sports	Women's street skateboarding	October 21
Silver	Maria Fernanda Costa	Swimming	Women's 400 metre freestyle	October 21
Silver	Leonardo de Deus	Swimming	Men's 200 metre butterfly	October 21
Silver	Raicca Ventura	Roller sports	Women's park skateboarding	October 22
Silver	Maria Fernanda Costa	Swimming	Women's 200 metre freestyle	October 22
Silver	Vinicius Lanza	Swimming	Men's 100 metre butterfly	October 22
Silver	Augusto Akio	Roller sports	Men's park skateboarding	October 22
Silver	Maria Clara Pacheco	Taekwondo	Women's 57 kg	October 22
Silver	Rebeca Andrade; Jade Barbosa; Carolyne Pedro; Flávia Saraiva; Júlia Soares	Gymnastics	Women's artistic team all-around	October 22
Silver	Diogo Soares	Gymnastics	Men's artistic individual all-around	October 23
Silver	Stephanie Balduccini	Swimming	Women's 100 metre freestyle	October 23
Silver	João Victor Oliva; Renderson Oliveira; Manuel Almeida; Paulo César dos Santos	Equestrian	Team dressage	October 23
Silver	Flávia Saraiva	Gymnastics	Women's artistic individual all-around	October 23
Silver	Arthur Nory	Gymnastics	Men's floor	October 24
Silver	Maria Fernanda Costa; Nathália Almeida; Stephanie Balduccini; Gabrielle Roncatto; Maria Paula Heitmann; Giovanna Diamante; Celine Bispo; Maria Luiza Pessanha	Swimming	Women's 4 × 200 metre freestyle relay	October 24
Silver	Rebeca Andrade	Gymnastics	Women's uneven bars	October 24
Silver	Beatriz Tavares	Rowing	Women's single sculls	October 25
Silver	Davi Silva; Fabrício Farias	Badminton	Men's doubles	October 25
Silver	João Victor Oliva	Equestrian	Individual dressage	October 25
Silver	Arthur Nory	Gymnastics	Men's vault	October 25
Silver	Guilherme Basseto; João Gomes Júnior; Vinícius Lanza; Guilherme Caribé; Gabriel Fantoni; Raphael Windmuller; Victor Baganha; Victor Alcará	Swimming	Men's 4 × 100 metre medley relay	October 25
Silver	Flávia Saraiva	Gymnastics	Women's balance beam	October 25
Silver	Flávia Saraiva	Gymnastics	Women's floor	October 25
Silver	Bernardo Miranda	Gymnastics	Men's horizontal bar	October 25
Silver	Brazil women's national volleyball team: Aline Segato; Carolina Leite; Helena Wenk; Laís Vasques; Larissa Besen; Lorena Viezel; Luzia Nezzo; Maiara Basso; Naiane Rios; Sabrina Machado; Tainara Santos; Talia Costa	Volleyball	Women's tournament	October 26
Silver	Tatiana Chagas	Boxing	Women's 54 kg	October 27
Silver	Keno Machado	Boxing	Men's 92 kg	October 27
Silver	Michael Trindade	Boxing	Men's 51 kg	October 27
Silver	Wanderley Pereira	Boxing	Men's 80 kg	October 27
Silver	Abner Teixeira	Boxing	Men's +92 kg	October 27
Silver	Brazil national baseball team: André Rienzo; Ariel Frigo; Daniel Missaki; Douglas Takano; Enzo Sawayama; Eric Pardinho; Fabio Murakami; Felipe Burin; Felipe Fukuda; Felipe Mizukosi; Felipe Natel; Gabriel Barbosa; Gabriel do Carmo; Jean Tomé; Lucas Rojo; Lucas Sakay; Murilo Gouvea; Oscar Nakaoshi; Osvaldo Carvalho Jr.; Paulo Orlando; Pedro Ivo Okuda; Raphael Parra; Salomon Koba; Victor Coutinho	Baseball	Men's tournament	October 28
Silver	Marcelo Demoliner; Luisa Stefani	Tennis	Mixed doubles	October 28
Silver	Ana Marcela Cunha	Swimming	Women's marathon 10 kilometres	October 29
Silver	Kauã Silva	Canoeing	Men's slalom C-1	October 29
Silver	Caio Bonfim	Athletics	Men's 20 kilometres walk	October 29
Silver	Pedro Gonçalves	Canoeing	Men's slalom K-1	October 29
Silver	Omira Estácia Neta	Canoeing	Women's slalom K-1	October 29
Silver	Márcio Jorge	Equestrian	Individual eventing	October 29
Silver	Daniel Cargnin	Judo	Men's 73 kg	October 29
Silver	Luiz Diniz	Surfing	Men's SUP surf	October 30
Silver	Aline Adisaka	Surfing	Women's SUP surf	October 30
Silver	Chloé Calmon	Surfing	Women's longboard	October 30
Silver	Rafael Macedo	Judo	Men's 90 kg	October 30
Silver	Andressa de Morais	Athletics	Women's discus throw	October 30
Silver	Bruna Takahashi; Vitor Ishiy	Table tennis	Mixed doubles	October 30
Silver	Eliane Martins	Athletics	Women's long jump	October 30
Silver	Douglas Hernandes; Letícia Nonato; Lucas Carvalho; Tiffani Marinho; Jayny Barreto; Lucas Conceição; Tábata Vitorino	Athletics	Mixed 4 × 400 metres relay	October 30
Silver	Gabriel Falcão; Guilherme Schimidt; Leonardo Gonçalves; Rafael Macedo; Rafael Silva; Willian Lima; Alexia Castilhos; Beatriz Souza; Luana Carvalho; Rafaela Silva	Judo	Mixed team	October 31
Silver	Bruna Takahashi; Giulia Takahashi	Table tennis	Women's doubles	October 31
Silver	José Fernando Ferreira	Athletics	Men's decathlon	October 31
Silver	Felipe Bardi	Athletics	Men's 100 metres	October 31
Silver	Hugo Calderano; Vitor Ishiy	Table tennis	Men's doubles	October 31
Silver	Bruna Takahashi	Table tennis	Women's singles	November 1
Silver	Evandilson Avelar Neto; Filipe Vieira	Canoeing	Men's C-2 500 metres	November 3
Silver	Bárbara Domingos	Gymnastics	Women's rhythmic individual hoop	November 3
Silver	Geovanna Santos	Gymnastics	Women's rhythmic individual ball	November 3
Silver	Ewellyn Santos	Athletics	Women's 400 metres hurdles	November 3
Silver	Matheus Lima	Athletics	Men's 400 metres hurdles	November 3
Silver	Joílson Júnior	Wrestling	Men's Greco-Roman 77 kg	November 3
Silver	Almir dos Santos	Athletics	Men's triple jump	November 3
Silver	Isaquias Queiroz	Canoeing	Men's C-1 1000 metres	November 4
Silver	Alice Gomes; Camilla Gomes	Gymnastics	Women's synchronized trampoline	November 4
Silver	Bárbara Domingos	Gymnastics	Women's rhythmic individual club	November 4
Silver	Maria Eduarda Alexandre	Gymnastics	Women's rhythmic individual ribbon	November 4
Silver	Camilla Gomes	Gymnastics	Women's trampoline individual	November 4
Silver	Rayan Dutra	Gymnastics	Men's trampoline individual	November 4
Silver	Lucas Miranda	Karate	Men's +84 kg	November 4
Silver	Bianca Ameixeiro	Roller sports	Women's free skating	November 4
Silver	Brazil men's national handball team: Gustavo Rodrigues; Jean-Pierre Dupoux; João Pedro da Silva; José Toledo; Leonardo Abrahão; Leonardo Dutra; Leonardo Terçariol; Haniel Langaro; Hugo Monte; Matheus da Silva; Rangel da Rosa; Rogério Ferreira; Rudolph Hackbarth; Thiagus Petrus	Handball	Men's tournament	November 4
Silver	Brazil men's national water polo team: Alexandre Mendes; Alípio Nardaci; Bruno Chiappini; Gabriel Sojo da Silva; Guilherme Barella; Gustavo Coutinho; Gustavo Guimarães; Logan Cabral; Luis Ricardo da Silva; Marcos Vinicius Pires; Pedro Real; Rafael Real; Roberto de Freitas	Water polo	Men's tournament	November 4
Silver	Pedro Henrique Rodrigues	Athletics	Men's javelin throw	November 4
Silver	Marcus Vinicius D'Almeida; Ana Clara Machado	Archery	Mixed team recurve	November 5
Silver	Ana Clara Machado	Archery	Women's individual recurve	November 5
Bronze	José Gabriel Marques	Cycling	Men's cross-country	October 21
Bronze	Raiza Goulão	Cycling	Women's cross-country	October 21
Bronze	Gabrielle Roncatto	Swimming	Women's 400 metre freestyle	October 21
Bronze	Ana Carolina Vieira; Stephanie Balduccini; Giovanna Diamante; Celine Bispo; Cristina Versiani	Swimming	Women's 4 × 100 metre freestyle relay	October 21
Bronze	Paulo Ricardo Melo	Taekwondo	Men's 58 kg	October 21
Bronze	Arthur Nory; Bernardo Actos; Diogo Soares; Patrick Sampaio; Yuri Guimarães	Gymnastics	Men's artistic team all-around	October 21
Bronze	Murilo Sartori	Swimming	Men's 200 metre freestyle	October 22
Bronze	Lucas Ostapiv	Taekwondo	Men's 80 kg	October 22
Bronze	Alexia Assunção	Swimming	Women's 200 metre backstroke	October 22
Bronze	Felipe Simioni	Water skiing	Men's slalom	October 23
Bronze	Gabrielle Assis	Swimming	Women's 200 metre breaststroke	October 23
Bronze	Viviane Jungblut	Swimming	Women's 800 metre freestyle	October 23
Bronze	Guilherme Basseto; João Gomes Júnior; Clarissa Rodrigues; Stephanie Balduccini; Gabriel Fantoni; Jhennifer Conceição; Victor Baganha; Giovanna Diamante	Swimming	Mixed 4 × 100 metre medley relay	October 23
Bronze	Ingrid Oliveira; Giovanna Pedroso	Diving	Women's synchronized 10 metre platform	October 23
Bronze	Laura Amaro	Weightlifting	Women's 81 kg	October 23
Bronze	Sânia Lima; Juliana Vieira	Badminton	Women's doubles	October 24
Bronze	Gabrielle Roncatto	Swimming	Women's 400 metre individual medley	October 24
Bronze	Brandonn Almeida	Swimming	Men's 400 metre individual medley	October 24
Bronze	Caroline Santos; Maria Clara Pacheco; Sandy Macedo	Taekwondo	Women's kyorugi team	October 24
Bronze	Flávia Saraiva	Gymnastics	Women's uneven bars	October 24
Bronze	Davi Silva; Sânia Lima	Badminton	Mixed doubles	October 24
Bronze	Viviane Jungblut	Swimming	Women's 1500 metre freestyle	October 25
Bronze	Leonardo Coelho	Swimming	Men's 200 metre individual medley	October 25
Bronze	Luiz Gabriel Oliveira	Boxing	Men's 57 kg	October 26
Bronze	Viviane Pereira	Boxing	Women's 75 kg	October 26
Bronze	Felipe Wu	Shooting	Men's 10 metre air pistol	October 26
Bronze	Yuri Falcão	Boxing	Men's 63.5 kg	October 26
Bronze	Amanda Lima	Judo	Women's 48 kg	October 28
Bronze	Willian Lima	Judo	Men's 66 kg	October 28
Bronze	Viviane Jungblut	Swimming	Women's marathon 10 kilometres	October 29
Bronze	Carlos Parro; Márcio Jorge; Rafael Losano; Ruy Fonseca	Equestrian	Team eventing	October 29
Bronze	Ketleyn Quadros	Judo	Women's 63 kg	October 29
Bronze	Thiago Monteiro	Tennis	Men's singles	October 29
Bronze	Carlos Bahia	Surfing	Men's longboard	October 30
Bronze	Kayo Santos	Judo	Men's 100 kg	October 30
Bronze	Beatriz Souza	Judo	Women's +78 kg	October 30
Bronze	Alexandre Camargo	Fencing	Men's épée	October 30
Bronze	Rafael Silva	Judo	Men's +100 kg	October 30
Bronze	Mariana Pistoia	Fencing	Women's foil	October 30
Bronze	Guilherme Toldo	Fencing	Men's foil	October 31
Bronze	Altobeli da Silva	Athletics	Men's 5000 metres	October 31
Bronze	Marlon Zanotelli; Pedro Veniss; Rodrigo Pessoa; Stephan Barcha	Equestrian	Team jumping	November 1
Bronze	Rafael Pereira	Athletics	Men's 110 metres hurdles	November 1
Bronze	Laura Miccuci; Gabriela Regly	Artistic swimming	Women's duet	November 2
Bronze	Maria Eduarda Alexandre	Gymnastics	Women's rhythmic individual all-around	November 2
Bronze	Ana Carolina Azevedo	Athletics	Women's 200 metres	November 2
Bronze	Socorro Reis	Sailing	Women's kite	November 3
Bronze	Guilherme Toldo; Pedro Marostega; Henrique Marques	Fencing	Men's team foil	November 3
Bronze	Brenda Padilha	Karate	Women's +68 kg	November 3
Bronze	Douglas Brose	Karate	Men's 60 kg	November 3
Bronze	Caio Bonfim; Viviane Lyra	Athletics	Race walk mixed team	November 4
Bronze	Rayan Dutra; Lucas Tobias	Gymnastics	Men's synchronized trampoline	November 4
Bronze	Bruna Takahashi; Giulia Takahashi; Bruna Alexandre	Table tennis	Women's team	November 4
Bronze	Filipe Otheguy	Basque pelota	Men's frontball	November 4
Bronze	Marcus Vinicius D'Almeida; Matheus Gomes; Matheus Ely	Archery	Men's team recurve	November 4
Bronze	Brazil women's national water polo team: Ana Júlia Amaral; Eduarda Estevão; Isabela Mendes; Jeniffer Cavalcante; Karen da Silva; Kemily Leão; Letícia Belorio; Letícia Silva; Luana de Souza; Rebecca Moreira; Samantha Ferreira; Stefany Azevedo; Thatiana Pregolini	Water polo	Women's tournament	November 4
Bronze	Samuel Albrecht; Gabriela Nicolino	Sailing	Nacra 17	November 4
Bronze	Rafael Martins; Juliana Duque	Sailing	Snipe	November 4
Bronze	Kelly Fernandes	Karate	Women's 55 kg	November 4
Bronze	Brazil women's national rugby sevens team: Aline Furtado; Andressa Alves; Bianca Silva; Gabriela Lima; Gisele Gomes; Luiza Campos; Mariana Nicolau; Marina Fioravanti; Milena Mariano; Rafaela Zanellato; Thalia Costa; Yasmim Soares	Rugby sevens	Women's tournament	November 4
Bronze	Giovani Salgado	Karate	Men's +84 kg	November 4
Bronze	Igor Queiroz	Wrestling	Men's Greco-Roman 97 kg	November 4
Bronze	Brazil men's national basketball team: Danilo Fuzaro; Didi Louzada; Elio Corazza Neto; Felipe Ruivo; Gabriel Jaú; Gui Deodato; Lucas Dias; Maique Oliveira; Márcio Henrique; Reynan dos Santos; Scott Machado; Wesley Castro	Basketball	Men's tournament	November 4
Bronze	Tatiane Raquel da Silva	Athletics	Women's 3000 metres steeplechase	November 4
Bronze	Anny de Bassi; Letícia Nonato; Jainy dos Santos; Tiffani Marinho	Athletics	Women's 4 × 400 metres relay	November 4
Bronze	Gustavo Oliveira	Cycling	Men's BMX freestyle	November 5

Medals by sport/discipline
Sport	1st place, gold medalist(s)	2nd place, silver medalist(s)	3rd place, bronze medalist(s)	Total
Gymnastics	11	16	4	**31**
Swimming	7	8	12	**27**
Athletics	7	10	6	**23**
Judo	7	3	6	**16**
Boxing	4	5	3	**12**
Canoeing	3	5	0	**8**
Roller sports	3	4	0	**7**
Tennis	3	1	1	**5**
Sailing	3	0	3	**6**
Table tennis	2	4	1	**7**
Wrestling	2	1	1	**4**
Beach volleyball	2	0	0	**2**
Triathlon	2	0	0	**2**
Equestrian	1	3	2	**6**
Surfing	1	3	1	**5**
Karate	1	1	4	**6**
Taekwondo	1	1	3	**5**
Handball	1	1	0	**2**
Rowing	1	1	0	**2**
Volleyball	1	1	0	**2**
Fencing	1	0	4	**5**
Basketball	1	0	1	**2**
Football	1	0	0	**1**
Archery	0	2	1	**3**
Badminton	0	1	2	**3**
Water polo	0	1	1	**2**
Baseball	0	1	0	**1**
Cycling	0	0	3	**3**
Artistic swimming	0	0	1	**1**
Basque pelota	0	0	1	**1**
Diving	0	0	1	**1**
Rugby sevens	0	0	1	**1**
Shooting	0	0	1	**1**
Water skiing	0	0	1	**1**
Weightlifting	0	0	1	**1**
Total	66	73	66	205

Medals by day
**Day**	1st place, gold medalist(s)	2nd place, silver medalist(s)	3rd place, bronze medalist(s)	**Total**
October 21	4	3	6	13
October 22	1	6	3	10
October 23	2	4	6	12
October 24	3	3	6	12
October 25	4	8	2	14
October 26	0	1	4	5
October 27	6	5	0	11
October 28	6	2	2	10
October 29	8	7	4	19
October 30	3	8	6	17
October 31	0	5	2	7
November 1	3	1	2	6
November 2	6	0	3	9
November 3	9	7	4	20
November 4	9	11	15	35
November 5	2	2	1	5
Total	66	73	66	**205**

Medals by gender
**Day**	1st place, gold medalist(s)	2nd place, silver medalist(s)	3rd place, bronze medalist(s)	**Total**
Male	30	33	29	92
Female	33	32	30	95
Mixed	3	8	7	18
Total	66	73	66	**205**

== Competitors ==
The following is the list of number of competitors (per gender) participating at the games per sport/discipline.

Sport	Men	Women	Total
Archery	4	5	9
Artistic swimming	0	9	9
Athletics	37	37	74
Badminton	4	3	7
Baseball	24	—N/a	24
Basketball	16	16	32
Basque pelota	1	0	1
Bowling	2	2	4
Boxing	7	6	13
Breaking	2	2	4
Canoeing	8	5	13
Cycling	12	14	26
Diving	4	5	9
Equestrian	15	0	15
Fencing	9	9	18
Field hockey	17	0	17
Football	18	0	18
Golf	2	2	4
Gymnastics	7	15	22
Handball	14	14	28
Judo	9	10	19
Karate	6	4	10
Modern pentathlon	3	3	6
Roller sports	5	5	10
Rowing	7	11	18
Rugby sevens	12	12	24
Sailing	8	9	17
Shooting	10	7	17
Sport climbing	4	3	7
Surfing	5	5	10
Swimming	22	22	44
Table tennis	3	3	6
Taekwondo	4	4	8
Tennis	3	3	6
Triathlon	4	3	7
Volleyball	14	14	28
Water polo	13	13	26
Water skiing	3	1	4
Weightlifting	3	3	6
Wrestling	7	3	10
Total	348	282	630

== Archery ==
Brazil qualified eight archers during the 2022 Pan American Archery Championships. Brazil also qualified one archer during the 2023 Copa Merengue.

Men

Athlete	Event	Ranking Round		Round of 32	Round of 16	Quarterfinals	Semifinals	Final / BM	Rank
Athlete	Event	Score	Seed	Opposition Score	Opposition Score	Opposition Score	Opposition Score	Opposition Score	Rank
Marcus Vinicius D'Almeida	Individual recurve	689	1	Ortegón (ECU); W 6–0	Vega (CUB); L 5–6	Did not advance			
Matheus Ely	Individual recurve	659	15	Franco (CUB); L 2–6	Did not advance				
Matheus Gomes	Individual recurve	653	19	Betancur (COL); L 3–7	Did not advance				
Luccas Abreu	Individual compound	705	3	—N/a	Martin (CHI); L 156–157	Did not advance			
Marcus Vinicius D'Almeida; Matheus Ely; Matheus Gomes	Team recurve	2001	4	—N/a		Canada; W 5–1	United States; L 2–6	Bronze medal final Colombia; W 5–3	3rd place, bronze medalist(s)

Women

Athlete	Event	Ranking Round		Round of 32	Round of 16	Quarterfinals	Semifinals	Final / BM	Rank
Athlete	Event	Score	Seed	Opposition Score	Opposition Score	Opposition Score	Opposition Score	Opposition Score	Rank
Ana Clara Machado	Individual recurve	647	6	Gagne (CAN); W 6–0	Nikitin (BRA); W 6–4	Ruiz (MEX); W 6–4	Kaufhold (USA); W 6–4	Valencia (MEX); L 1–7	2nd place, silver medalist(s)
Ane Marcelle dos Santos	Individual recurve	623	15	Chacon (VEN); L 4–6	Did not advance				
Sarah Nikitin	Individual recurve	635	11	Esquella (CHI); W 6–2	Machado (BRA); L 4–6	Did not advance			
Eiry Cristina Nisi	Individual compound	686	10	—N/a	Ramirez (PUR); L 129–146	Did not advance			
Larissa Oliveira	Individual compound	689	8	—N/a	Corado (ESA); L 155–156	Did not advance			
Ana Clara Machado; Ane Marcelle dos Santos; Sarah Nikitin	Team recurve	1905	4	—N/a		Canada; W 5–1	Mexico; L 2–6	Bronze medal final Colombia; L 4–5	4
Eiry Cristina Nisi; Larissa Oliveira	Team compound	1375	4	—N/a		El Salvador; L 151–155	Did not advance		

Mixed

Athlete	Event	Ranking Round		Round of 32	Round of 16	Quarterfinals	Semifinals	Final / BM	Rank
Athlete	Event	Score	Seed	Opposition Score	Opposition Score	Opposition Score	Opposition Score	Opposition Score	Rank
Marcus Vinicius D'Almeida; Ana Clara Machado	Team recurve	1336	3	—N/a	Peru; W 6–0	Argentina; W 6–2	Mexico; W 6–2	United States; L 2–6	2nd place, silver medalist(s)
Luccas Abreu; Larissa Oliveira	Team compound	1394	4	—N/a		Puerto Rico; W 153–152	United States; L 156–158	Bronze medal final Mexico; L 153–155	4

== Artistic swimming ==
Brazil qualified a full team of nine artistic swimmers after winning the competition in the 2022 South American Games.

Athlete	Event	Technical Routine		Free Routine		Acrobatic Routine		Total	
Athlete	Event	Points	Rank	Points	Rank	Points	Rank	Points	Rank
Gabriela Regly; Laura Miccuci	Women's duet	198.2833	4	191.9604	3	—N/a		390.2437	3rd place, bronze medalist(s)
Anna Giulia Franca; Celina Rangel; Gabriela Regly; Jaddy Milla; Laura Miccuci; Jullia Catharino; Sara Marinho; Vitória Casale	Team	214.0904	4	217.7750	4	193.1600	4	625.0254	4

== Athletics ==
On October 5, 2023 Brazilian Athletics Confederation announced the pool team of 74 athletes (37 men and 37 women), including 7 athletes qualified through the 2021 Junior Pan American Games.

Key

- Note–Ranks given for track events are within the athlete's heat only
- Q = Qualified for the next round
- q = Qualified for the next round as a fastest loser
- Bye = Athlete not required to compete in round

Men

Track & road events

Athlete	Event	Semifinal		Final	
Athlete	Event	Result	Rank	Result	Rank
Erik Cardoso	100 m	10.43	1 Q	10.36	4
Felipe Bardi	100 m	10.33	2 Q	10.31	2nd place, silver medalist(s)
Paulo André Camilo	100 m	49.83	7	Did not advance	
Renan Gallina	200 m	20.39	1 Q	20.37	1st place, gold medalist(s)
Lucas Carvalho	400 m	46.79	1 Q	46.84	4
Lucas Conceição	400 m	45.76	1 Q	45.77	1st place, gold medalist(s)
Eduardo Moreira	800 m	1:48.37	8	Did not advance	
Leandro Prates	800 m	1:49.47	13	Did not advance	
Thiago André	1500 m	—N/a		3:40.48	6
Altobelli da Silva	5000 m	—N/a		14:48.18	3rd place, bronze medalist(s)
Daniel do Nascimento	10,000 m	—N/a		DNS	
Eduardo de Deus	110 m hurdles	—N/a		13.67	1st place, gold medalist(s)
Rafael Pereira	110 m hurdles	—N/a		14.04	3rd place, bronze medalist(s)
Matheus Lima	400 m hurdles	49.94	1 Q	49.69	2nd place, silver medalist(s)
Márcio Teles	400 m hurdles	51.20	3 Q	50.80	7
Matheus Estevão da Silva	3000 m steeplechase	—N/a		8:57.90	6
Gleison da Silva	3000 m steeplechase	—N/a		9:22.38	13
Erik Cardoso; Felipe Bardi; Rodrigo Nascimento; Renan Gallina	4 × 100 m relay	38.84	1 Q	38.68	1st place, gold medalist(s)
Douglas Hernandes; Lucas Conceição; Lucas Carvalho; Matheus Lima; Maxuel Santana	4 × 400 m relay	—N/a		3:03.92	1st place, gold medalist(s)
Caio Bonfim	20 km walk	—N/a		1:19:24	2nd place, silver medalist(s)
Matheus Corrêa	20 km walk	—N/a		1:20:19	5
Johnatas Cruz	Marathon	—N/a		2:14:51	5
Paulo Roberto Paula	Marathon	—N/a		2:15:20	6

Field events

Athlete	Event	Final	
Athlete	Event	Distance	Position
Fernando Ferreira	High jump	2.21	5
Thiago Moura	High jump	2.18	9
Weslley Beraldo	Long jump	7.65	6
Almir dos Santos	Triple jump	16.92	2nd place, silver medalist(s)
Darlan Romani	Shot put	21.36	1st place, gold medalist(s)
Welington Morais	Shot put	20.26	5
Alan de Falchi	Discus throw	54.34	10
Alencar Chagas	Hammer throw	70.54	9
Luiz Maurício da Silva	Javelin throw	68.26	9
Pedro Henrique Rodrigues	Javelin throw	78.45	2nd place, silver medalist(s)

Combined events – Decathlon

Athlete	Event	100 m	LJ	SP	HJ	400 m	110H	DT	PV	JT	1500 m	Final	Rank
Felipe dos Santos	Result	11.06	6.66	14.49	1.89	53.89	15.03	41.54	4.80	49.23	DNS	6656	8
Felipe dos Santos	Points	847	734	758	705	644	846	696	849	577	0	6656	8
José Fernando Ferreira	Result	10.91	6.97	14.37	1.98	50.53	14.30	34.98	4.90	63.71	4:59.80	7748	2nd place, silver medalist(s)
José Fernando Ferreira	Points	881	807	751	785	790	936	563	880	794	561	7748	2nd place, silver medalist(s)

Women

Track & road events

Athlete	Event	Semifinal		Final	
Athlete	Event	Result	Rank	Result	Rank
Ana Carolina Azevedo	100 m	11.64	2 Q	11.58	4
Gabriela Mourão	100 m	DNS		—N/a	
Ana Carolina Azevedo	200 m	23.61	1 Q	23.52	3rd place, bronze medalist(s)
Tábata Vitorino	400 m	55.57	3 Q	DNS	
Tiffani Marinho	400 m	52.83	5 q	52.81	6
Jaqueline Weber	800 m	2:04.12	2 Q	2:04.99	4
Caroline Tomaz	100 m hurdles	13.62	5	Did not advance	
Ketiley Batista	100 m hurdles	13.31	3 Q	13.38	4
Camille de Oliveira	400 m hurdles	1:00.72	5	Did not advance	
Chayenne da Silva	400 m hurdles	57.85	1 Q	DNF	8
Ewellyn Santos	400 m hurdles	58.29	2 Q	57.18	2nd place, silver medalist(s)
Mirelle da Silva	3000 m steeplechase	—N/a		10:29.72	12
Simone Ferraz	3000 m steeplechase	—N/a		10:00.62	6
Tatiane Raquel da Silva	3000 m steeplechase	—N/a		9:41.29	3rd place, bronze medalist(s)
Ana Carolina Azevedo; Anny de Bassi; Caroline de Melo; Gabriela Mourão; Letícia Nonato	4 × 100 m relay	44.71	5 q	44.67	5
Anny de Bassi; Jainy dos Santos; Letícia Nonato; Tiffani Marinho; Chayenne da Silva; Ewellyn Santos	4 × 400 m relay	—N/a		3:34.80	3rd place, bronze medalist(s)
Gabriela de Sousa	20 km walk	—N/a		No result^{N}	9
Viviane Lyra	20 km walk	—N/a		No result^{N}	4
Andreia Hessel	Marathon	—N/a		2:39:53	9
Valdilene dos Santos Silva	Marathon	—N/a		2:38:40	8

^{N} - The results for the women's 20 km race walk were declared void after the race distance was remeasured and found to be 3 km short.

Field events

Athlete	Event	Final	
Athlete	Event	Distance	Position
Valdiléia Martins	High jump	1.78	5
Arielly Monteiro	High jump	1.78	6
Beatriz Chagas	Pole vault	3.80	10
Isabel Quadros	Pole vault	4.00	9
Juliana Campos	Pole vault	4.35	4
Eliane Martins	Long jump	6.49	2nd place, silver medalist(s)
Leticia Oro Melo	Long jump	6.19	6
Gabriele Sousa dos Santos	Triple jump	13.65	4
Núbia Soares	Triple jump	12.78	6
Ana Caroline Silva	Shot put	16.70	5
Lívia Avancini	Shot put	16.54	8
Andressa Morais	Discus throw	59.29	2nd place, silver medalist(s)
Izabela Rodrigues	Discus throw	59.63	1st place, gold medalist(s)
Mariana Marcelino	Hammer throw	58.32	9
Jucilene de Lima	Javelin throw	59.04	5

Combined events – Heptathlon

Athlete	Event	100H	HJ	SP	200 m	LJ	JT	800 m	Final	Rank
Raiane Procópio	Result	14.76	1.61	12.13	26.50	5.37	42.58	2:24.85	5184	7
Raiane Procópio	Points	874	747	670	754	663	717	759	5184	7
Tamara de Sousa	Result	14.53	1.64	13.07	26.57	5.56	39.78	2:55.61	4955	8
Tamara de Sousa	Points	905	783	732	748	717	663	407	4955	8

Mixed

Track & road events

Athlete	Event	Final	
Athlete	Event	Result	Rank
Douglas Hernandes; Lucas Carvalho; Letícia Nonato; Tiffani Marinho; Lucas Conceição; Jainy dos Santos; Tábata Vitorino	4 × 400 m relay	3:18.55	2nd place, silver medalist(s)
Caio Bonfim; Viviane Lyra	Marathon race walk team	3:02:14	3rd place, bronze medalist(s)

== Badminton ==
Brazil qualified a full team of eight athletes (four men and four women).

Men

Athlete	Event	First round	Second round	Quarterfinals	Semifinals	Final / BM	
Athlete	Event	Opposition Result	Opposition Result	Opposition Result	Opposition Result	Opposition Result	Rank
Ygor Coelho	Singles	Sanhueza (CHI); W 21–10, 21–9	Oliva (ARG); W 21–17, 21–15	Garrido (MEX); L 14–21, 15–21	Did not advance		
Jonathan Matias	Singles	Medel (CHI); W 21–9, 21–13	Barrios (VEN); W 21–10, 21–8	Yang (CAN); L 10–21, 12–21	Did not advance		
Fabrício Farias; Davi Silva	Doubles	Evans / Ricketts (JAM); W 21–11, 21–12	—N/a	Chiu / Yuan (USA); W 21–19, 15–21, 21–18	Marroquín / Solís (EAI); W 21–18, 21–16	Dong / Yakura (CAN); L 21–19, 15–21, 18–21	2nd place, silver medalist(s)

Women

Athlete	Event	First round	Second round	Third round	Quarterfinals	Semifinals	Final / BM	
Athlete	Event	Opposition Result	Opposition Result	Opposition Result	Opposition Result	Opposition Result	Opposition Result	Rank
Sâmia Lima	Singles	Bye	Zambrano (ECU); W 21–18, 21–19	Zhang (CAN); L 13–21, 20–22	Did not advance			
Juliana Vieira	Singles	Bye	Ramdhani (GUY); W 21–6, 11–0 ^{RET}	Zhang (USA); L 14–21, 6–21	Did not advance			
Jaqueline Lima; Sâmia Lima	Doubles	Fregoso / Rodriguez (MEX); L WDR	—N/a		Did not advance			
Sânia Lima; Juliana Vieira	Doubles	Diaz / Montre (CHI); W 21–6, 21–8	—N/a		Zhang / Zhang (CAN); W 21–9, 19–21, 21–18	Xu / Xu (USA); L 7–21, 18–21	Did not advance	3rd place, bronze medalist(s)

Mixed

Athlete	Event	First round	Second round	Quarterfinals	Semifinals	Final / BM	
Athlete	Event	Opposition Result	Opposition Result	Opposition Result	Opposition Result	Opposition Result	Rank
Fabrício Farias; Jaqueline Lima	Doubles	Bye	Oliva / Oliva (ARG); L WDR	Did not advance			
Davi Silva; Sânia Lima	Doubles	Bye	Solís / Corleto (EAI); W 21–12, 22–24, 21–14	Montoya / Rodríguez (MEX); W 21–15, 23–21	Chiu / Gai (USA); L 22–20, 16–21, 16–21	Did not advance	3rd place, bronze medalist(s)

== Baseball ==
Summary

Team	Event	Preliminary round				Super Round			Final / BM / Pl.	
Team	Event	Opposition Result	Opposition Result	Opposition Result	Rank	Opposition Result	Opposition Result	Rank	Opposition Result	Rank
Brazil men's	Men's tournament	Venezuela; W 3–1	Colombia; W 8–7	Cuba; W 4–2	1 Q	Panama; W 5–3	Mexico; L 1–5	1 Q	Colombia; L 1–9	2nd place, silver medalist(s)

Preliminary round
Brazil qualified a men's team (of 24 athletes) by winning the 2022 South American Baseball Championship.

Group B

Pos	Team	Pld	W	L	RF	RA	PCT	GB	Qualification
1	Brazil	3	3	0	15	10	1.000	—	Super Round
2	Colombia	3	1	2	16	14	.333	2	Super Round
3	Cuba	3	1	2	11	13	.333	2	Fifth place game
4	Venezuela	3	1	2	9	14	.333	2	Seventh place game

Source: Santiago 2023 and WBSC Americas

October 19; 15:00	Venezuela	1–3	Brazil	Parque Bicentenario de Cerrillos, Cerrillos
October 19; 15:00		Boxscore		Parque Bicentenario de Cerrillos, Cerrillos

October 22; 9:30	Brazil	8–7 (F/9)	Colombia	Parque Bicentenario de Cerrillos, Cerrillos
October 22; 9:30		Boxscore		Parque Bicentenario de Cerrillos, Cerrillos

October 24; 9:30	Brazil	4–2	Cuba	Parque Bicentenario de Cerrillos, Cerrillos
October 24; 9:30		Boxscore		Parque Bicentenario de Cerrillos, Cerrillos

Super round

Pos	Team	Pld	W	L	RF	RA	PCT	GB	Qualification
1	Brazil	3	2	1	14	15	.667	—	Gold medal game
2	Colombia	3	2	1	19	11	.667	—	Gold medal game
3	Panama	3	1	2	12	9	.333	1	Bronze medal game
4	Mexico	3	1	2	9	19	.333	1	Bronze medal game

Source: Santiago 2023 and WBSC Americas

October 25; 15:00	Brazil	5–3	Panama	Parque Bicentenario de Cerrillos, Cerrillos
October 25; 15:00		Boxscore		Parque Bicentenario de Cerrillos, Cerrillos

October 27; 15:00	Mexico	5–1	Brazil	Parque Bicentenario de Cerrillos, Cerrillos
October 27; 15:00		Boxscore		Parque Bicentenario de Cerrillos, Cerrillos

Gold medal game

October 28; 15:00	Colombia	9–1	Brazil	Parque Bicentenario de Cerrillos, Cerrillos
October 28; 15:00		Boxscore		Parque Bicentenario de Cerrillos, Cerrillos

October 28, 2023 15:00 at Parque Bicentenario de Cerrillos in Cerrillos, Chile
Team	1	2	3	4	5	6	7	R	H	E
Colombia	1	0	1	3	1	2	1	9	17	1
Brazil	0	1	0	0	0	0	0	1	4	0
WP: Víctor Vargas LP: Felipe Natel; Umpires: HP – Edwin Hernández, 1B – Emmanuel Pérez, 2B – Christian Madero, 3B – Gregori Jiménez; Boxscore

== Basketball ==
=== 5x5 ===
Summary

Team	Event	Group stage				Semifinal	Final / BM / Pl.	
Team	Event	Opposition Result	Opposition Result	Opposition Result	Rank	Opposition Result	Opposition Result	Rank
Brazil men's	Men's tournament	Mexico; W 74–54	Chile; W 94–43	Puerto Rico; W 72–69	1 Q	Venezuela; L 77–84	Bronze medal match Mexico; W 73–61	3rd place, bronze medalist(s)
Brazil women's	Women's tournament	Mexico; W 72–54	Venezuela; W 97–47	Colombia; W 78–57	1 Q	Argentina; W 77–57	Colombia; W 50–40	1st place, gold medalist(s)

==== Men's tournament ====
Brazil qualified a men's team (of 12 athletes) by finishing second in the 2022 FIBA Americup.

Preliminary round

Pos	Team	Pld	W	L	PF	PA	PD	Pts	Qualification
1	Brazil	3	3	0	240	166	+74	6	Semifinals
2	Mexico	3	1	2	195	209	−14	4 (Note: Head to head record: Mexico 1−1 (+6), Chile 1−1 (0), Puerto Rico 1−1 (−6))	Semifinals
3	Chile (H)	3	1	2	172	223	−51	4	Fifth place game
4	Puerto Rico	3	1	2	211	220	−9	4	Seventh place game

Source: Santiago 2023
(H) Hosts
Notes:

31 October 2023
17:30

Boxscore

Mexico	54–74	Brazil
Scoring by quarter: 10–19, 13–23, 13–18, 18–14
Pts: Valdés, Jaimes 9 Rebs: Camacho 5 Asts: Andriassi 3		Pts: Crepaldi 14; Rebs: Louzada, Crepaldi 6 Asts: Corazza 4

Multisport Complex 1, Santiago
Referees: Gastón Maina (URU), Daniel Nieves (VEN), Kevin Lei (CAN)

1 November 2023
20:00

Boxscore

Brazil	94–43	Chile
Scoring by quarter: 33–7, 20–8, 21–10, 20–18
Pts: Dias 21; Rebs: Crepaldi 7 Asts: Corazza 6		Pts: Jones 9 Rebs: Carrión 4 Asts: Morales 5

Multisport Complex 1, Santiago
Referees: Daniel García (VEN), Carlos Vélez (COL), Orlando Varela (HON)

2 November 2023
17:30

Boxscore

Brazil	72–69	Puerto Rico
Scoring by quarter: 19–15, 13–21, 21–17, 19–16
Pts: Dias 17; Rebs: Fuzaro 6 Asts: Corazza 6		Pts: Boyd 18; Rebs: Cintron 9 Asts: three players 3

Multisport Complex 1, Santiago
Referees: Andrés Maina (URU), Carlos Londono (COL), Kevin Lei (CAN)

Semifinal

3 November 2023
20:00

Boxscore

Brazil	77–84	Venezuela
Scoring by quarter: 15–25, 22–31, 20–14, 20–14
Pts: Pereira 22; Rebs: Crepaldi 10; Asts: Corazza 8		Pts: Sifontes 22; Rebs: Colmenares, Sojo 7 Asts: Pirela 6

Multisport Complex 1, Santiago
Referees: Luis Vásquez (PUR), Michael Scott (CAN), Carmelo de la Rosa (PUR)

Bronze medal game

4 November 2023
17:00

Boxscore

Mexico	61–73	Brazil
Scoring by quarter: 10–21, 13–18, 17–17, 21–17
Pts: Montano 16; Rebs: Jaimes 8 Asts: Montano 4		Pts: Camilo 18; Rebs: Crepaldi 10; Asts: Dias 5

Multisport Complex 1, Santiago
Referees: Jorge Vásquez (PUR), Leonardo Zalazar (ARG), Johnny Batista (PUR)

==== Women's tournament ====
Brazil qualified a women's team (of 12 athletes) after winning the 2023 FIBA Women's AmeriCup.

Preliminary round

Pos	Team	Pld	W	L	PF	PA	PD	Pts	Qualification
1	Brazil	3	3	0	244	158	+86	6	Semifinals
2	Colombia	3	2	1	196	189	+7	5	Semifinals
3	Venezuela	3	1	2	175	232	−57	4	Fifth place game
4	Mexico	3	0	3	173	209	−36	3	Seventh place game

Source: Santiago 2023

25 October 2023
10:30

Boxscore

Brazil	72–54	Mexico
Scoring by quarter: 16–12, 19–16, 21–14, 16–12
Pts: Fausto, Lopes 12; Rebs: de Souza 13; Asts: de Oliveira 4		Pts: Ávila, Luna 9 Rebs: Luna 8 Asts: Ramírez 3

Multisport Complex 1, Santiago
Referees: Roberto Vásquez (PUR), Kristian Páez (ECU), Micaela Prado (ARG)

26 October 2023
10:30

Boxscore

Venezuela	47–94	Brazil
Scoring by quarter: 21–16, 5–31, 5–28, 16–19
Pts: Durán 11; Rebs: Corrales 5 Asts: Rivera 3		Pts: de Souza 14; Rebs: de Souza 9 Asts: Zabani 7

Multisport Complex 1, Santiago
Referees: Micaela Prado (ARG), Aline García (URU), Kelsey Kisilevich (CAN)

27 October 2023
10:30

Boxscore

Brazil	78–57	Colombia
Scoring by quarter: 22–23, 19–8, 11–16, 26–10
Pts: de Souza 14; Rebs: de Souza 8 Asts: dos Santos 8		Pts: Ríos 16; Rebs: Ríos 7 Asts: Muñoz, Ríos 3

Multisport Complex 1, Santiago
Referees: Julio Anaya (PAN), Kristian Páez (ECU), Orlando Varela (HON)

Semifinal

28 October 2023
20:00

Boxscore

Brazil	77–57	Argentina
Scoring by quarter: 27–17, 15–18, 19–11, 16–11
Pts: Zabani 19; Rebs: Fausto 13; Asts: Darrigo, Zabani 4		Pts: Gauna 14; Rebs: three players 5 Asts: Fernández, Suárez 3

Multisport Complex 1, Santiago
Referees: Luis Vázquez (PUR), Andrés Bartel (URU), Kevin Lei (CAN)

Gold medal game

29 October 2023
20:00

Boxscore

Colombia	40–50	Brazil
Scoring by quarter: 15–23, 8–9, 6–6, 11–12
Pts: Delgado 15; Rebs: Paz 14; Asts: Ríos 5		Pts: de Souza 13; Rebs: de Souza 12; Asts: dos Santos 4

Multisport Complex 1, Santiago
Referees: Daniel García (VEN), Kelsey Kisilevich (CAN), Orlando Varela (HON)

=== 3x3 ===
Summary

Team	Event	Preliminary round			Quarterfinal	Semifinal	Final / BM / Pl.	
Team	Event	Opposition Result	Opposition Result	Rank	Opposition Result	Opposition Result	Opposition Result	Rank
Brazil men's	Men's tournament	Haiti; W 21–7	Venezuela; W 20–19	1 Q	Trinidad and Tobago; L 19–20	Did not advance		5
Brazil women's	Women's tournament	Uruguay; W 22–12	Argentina; W 13–11	1 Q	Chile; L 14–18	Did not advance		5

==== Men's tournament ====
Brazil qualified a men's team (of 4 athletes) by finishing third in the 2022 FIBA 3x3 AmeriCup.

Preliminary round

Pos	Team	Pld	W	L	PF	PA	PD	Qualification
1	Brazil	2	2	0	41	26	+15	Quarterfinals
2	Venezuela	2	1	1	40	36	+4	Quarterfinals
3	Haiti	2	0	2	23	42	−19	

Source: Report
Rules for classification: 1) Wins; 2) Head-to-head record; 3) Points scored.

21 October 2023
19:00

Report

Brazil	21–7	Haiti
Pts: Branquinho 12		Pts: Salvant 4

Estadio Español
Referees: Jorge Garcia (DOM) / Lautaro Ojeda (ARG)

22 October 2023
16:30

Report

Brazil	20–19	Venezuela
Pts: de Mello 10		Pts: Palacios 9

Estadio Español
Referees: María Olivieri (ARG) / Felipe Valenzuela (CHI)

Quarterfinal

22 October 2023
19:30

Report

Brazil	19–20	Trinidad and Tobago
Pts: Branquinho 11		Pts: Ahkeel Boyd 11

Estadio Español
Referees: Sonia Maldonado (PUR) / Lautaro Ojeda (ARG)

==== Women's tournament ====
Brazil qualified a women's team (of 4 athletes) by finishing second in the 2022 FIBA 3x3 AmeriCup.

Preliminary round

Pos	Team	Pld	W	L	PF	PA	PD	Qualification
1	Brazil	2	2	0	35	23	+12	Quarterfinals
2	Argentina	2	1	1	29	22	+7	Quarterfinals
3	Uruguay	2	0	2	21	40	−19	

Source: Report
Rules for classification: 1) Wins; 2) Head-to-head record; 3) Points scored.

21 October 2023
13:30

Report

Brazil	22–12	Uruguay
Pts: Domingos 9		Pts: Zeballos 7

Estadio Español Las Condes, Santiago
Referees: María Olivieri (ARG), Jorge Garcia (DOM)

22 October 2023
14:30

Report

Argentina	11–13	Brazil
Pts: Gentinetta 5		Pts: Domingos 6

Estadio Español Las Condes, Santiago
Referees: Nicolás Sarli (URU), Yilizeth Vence (COL)

Quarterfinal

22 October 2023
17:30

Report

Brazil	14–18	Chile
Pts: Domingos 7		Pts: Morrison 10

Estadio Español Las Condes, Santiago
Referees: Sonia Maldonado (PUR), Nicolás Sarli (URU)

== Basque pelota ==
Brazil qualified a male pelotari through the 2023 Pan American Basque Pelota Tournament.

Men

Athlete	Event	Preliminary round					Semifinal	Final / BM	
Athlete	Event	Opposition Score	Opposition Score	Opposition Score	Opposition Score	Rank	Opposition Score	Opposition Score	Rank
Filipe Otheguy	Frontball	Mateos (USA); W 2–0	Quinto (PER); W 2–0	Abréu (CUB); L 0–2	—N/a	2 Q	Álvarez (MEX); L 0–2	Bronze medal match Comas (ARG); W 2–0	3rd place, bronze medalist(s)

== Bowling ==
Brazil qualified a full team of four bowlers (two men and two women) through the 2022 PABCON Champion of Champions held in Rio de Janeiro, Brazil. The team was officially announced on March 7, 2023.

Men

Athlete	Event	Ranking round																		Semifinal	Final	
Athlete	Event	Block 1								Block 2								Total	Rank	Opposition Result	Opposition Result	Rank
Athlete	Event	1	2	3	4	5	6	7	8	9	10	11	12	13	14	15	16	Total	Rank	Opposition Result	Opposition Result	Rank
Marcelo Suartz	Singles	202	215	200	224	239	191	197	187	156	252	208	181	238	172	180	191	3233	14	Did not advance		
Bruno Soares Costa	Singles	193	186	177	237	186	191	226	186	163	210	234	135	241	206	176	179	3126	23	Did not advance		
Marcelo Suartz; Bruno Soares Costa	Doubles	198	224	190	216	245	227	150	205	213	169	177	200	237	199	204	168	3222	7	—N/a		

Women

Athlete	Event	Ranking round																		Semifinal	Final	
Athlete	Event	Block 1								Block 2								Total	Rank	Opposition Result	Opposition Result	Rank
Athlete	Event	1	2	3	4	5	6	7	8	9	10	11	12	13	14	15	16	Total	Rank	Opposition Result	Opposition Result	Rank
Stephanie Martins	Singles	186	200	210	176	150	184	183	183	213	199	187	188	199	217	202	181	3058	14	Did not advance		
Roberta Rodrigues	Singles	169	224	165	183	222	189	185	233	212	190	185	204	178	237	190	188	3154	6	Did not advance		
Stephanie Martins; Roberta Rodrigues	Doubles	188	176	199	170	174	187	172	190	218	156	166	211	152	158	200	214	2931	5	—N/a		

== Boxing ==
Brazil qualified 13 boxers (seven men and six women). The team was named on September 8, 2023.

Men

Athlete	Event	Round of 32	Round of 16	Quarterfinal	Semifinal	Final	
Athlete	Event	Opposition Result	Opposition Result	Opposition Result	Opposition Result	Opposition Result	Rank
Michael Trindade	–51 kg	—N/a	López (EAI); W 5–0	González (VEN); W 3–2	Quiroga (ARG); W 4–1	Alcantara (DOM); L WDR	2nd place, silver medalist(s)
Luiz Gabriel Oliveira	–57 kg	—N/a	Tremblay (CAN); W RSC R2	Fernández (URU); W 5–0	Harvey (USA); L 0–5	Did not advance	3rd place, bronze medalist(s)
Yuri Falcão	–63.5 kg	Bye	Jones (GRN); W RSC R3	Contreras (ESA); W 5–0	Sanford (CAN); L 0–5	Did not advance	3rd place, bronze medalist(s)
Wanderson Oliveira	–71 kg	—N/a	Rodríguez (ECU); L 1–4	Did not advance			
Wanderley Pereira	–80 kg	—N/a	Trujillo (EAI); W RSC R2	Pinales (DOM); W 5–0	Dulièpre (HAI); W 5–0	López (CUB); L 0–5	2nd place, silver medalist(s)
Keno Machado	–92 kg	—N/a	Bye	Hurtado (COL); W 5–0	Colwell (CAN); W WDR	La Cruz (CUB); L 1–4	2nd place, silver medalist(s)
Abner Teixeira	+92 kg	—N/a	Bye	Cruz (MEX); W 5–0	Salcedo (COL); W 4–1	Edwards (USA); L WDR	2nd place, silver medalist(s)

Women

Athlete	Event	Round of 16	Quarterfinal	Semifinal	Final	
Athlete	Event	Opposition Result	Opposition Result	Opposition Result	Opposition Result	Rank
Caroline Almeida	–50 kg	Sterling (HAI); W 5–0	Hinestroza (PAN); W 5–0	Valencia (COL); W 4–1	Lozano (USA); W 5–0	1st place, gold medalist(s)
Tatiana Chagas	–54 kg	de León (DOM); W 3–2	Sánchez (ECU); W 5–0	Bravo (CHI); W 4–1	Arias (COL); L 2–3	2nd place, silver medalist(s)
Jucielen Romeu	–57 kg	Herrera (ARG); W 5–0	Bamberger (PER); W 5–0	Alcalá (VEN); W 4–1	Arboleda (COL); W 5–0	1st place, gold medalist(s)
Beatriz Ferreira	–60 kg	Falcon Reyes (MEX); W 5–0	Sánchez (CRC); W RSC R1	Gonzalez (USA); W 4–1	Valdés (COL); W 5–0	1st place, gold medalist(s)
Bárbara Santos	–66 kg	Bye	Moronta (DOM); W 5–0	Camilo (COL); W 3–2	McCane (USA); W 5–0	1st place, gold medalist(s)
Viviane Pereira	–75 kg	Balbuena (ARG); W 5–0	Gittens (BAR); W 5–0	Bylon (PAN); L 0–5	Did not advance	3rd place, bronze medalist(s)

== Breaking ==
Brazil qualified four breakdancers (two men and two women) through the WDSF World Rankings.

Athlete	Nickname	Event	Round robin				Quarterfinal	Semifinal	Final / BM	
Athlete	Nickname	Event	Opposition Result	Opposition Result	Opposition Result	Rank	Opposition Result	Opposition Result	Opposition Result	Rank
Gilberto Araújo	Rato	B-Boys	Gravity (USA); L 0–2	Broly (ARG); W 2–0	NiñoNino (MEX); W 2–0	2 Q	Jeffro (USA); L 0–2	Did not advance		6
Leony Pinheiro	Leony	B-Boys	Lil G (VEN); L 0–2	Daf (CHI); W 2–0	Ricky Rulez (COL); W 2–0	2 Q	Phil Wizard (CAN); L 0–2	Did not advance		8
Mayara Collins	Mini Japa	B-Girls	Sunny (USA); L 0–2	Menta (CHI); W 2–0	Nathana (BRA); W 2–0	2 Q	La Vix (USA); L 0–2	Did not advance		6
Nathana Venâncio	Nathana	B-Girls	Menta (CHI); L 0–2	Sunny (USA); L 0–2	Mini Japa (BRA); L 0–2	4	Did not advance			13

== Canoeing ==
=== Slalom ===
Brazil qualified a total of six slalom canoeists (three men and three women). The team was officially named on July 31, 2023.

Men

Athlete	Event	Preliminary round			Semifinal		Final	
Athlete	Event	Run 1	Run 2	Rank	Time	Rank	Time	Rank
Kauã Silva	C-1	~~87.46~~	86.60	4 Q	106.85	2 Q	97.22	2nd place, silver medalist(s)
Pedro Gonçalves	K-1	~~75.35~~	74.90	1 Q	93.53	1 Q	94.08	2nd place, silver medalist(s)
Guilherme Mapelli	EK-1	50.70	—N/a	2 Q	—N/a	1 Q	—N/a	1st place, gold medalist(s)
Kauã Silva	EK-1	52.67	—N/a	9	Did not advance			
Pedro Gonçalves	EK-1	51.52	—N/a	6	Did not advance			

Women

Athlete	Event	Preliminary round			Semifinal		Final	
Athlete	Event	Run 1	Run 2	Rank	Time	Rank	Time	Rank
Ana Sátila	C-1	~~DSQ~~	87.78	1 Q	324.04	6 Q	108.52	1st place, gold medalist(s)
Omira Estácia Neta	K-1	85.10	~~88.21~~	2 Q	106.29	2 Q	110.54	2nd place, silver medalist(s)
Ana Sátila	EK-1	52.65	—N/a	1 Q	—N/a	1 Q	—N/a	1st place, gold medalist(s)
Beatriz Motta	EK-1	58.17	—N/a	8	Did not advance			
Omira Estácia Neta	EK-1	56.00	—N/a	5	Did not advance			

=== Sprint ===
Brazil qualified a total of seven sprint canoeists (five men and two women). The team was officially named on October 10, 2023.

Men

Athlete	Event	Heat		Semifinal		Final	
Athlete	Event	Time	Rank	Time	Rank	Time	Rank
Isaquias Queiroz	C-1 1000 m	3:55.32	1 FA	Bye		3:54.05	2nd place, silver medalist(s)
Filipe Vieira; Evandilson Neto	C-2 500 m	—N/a				1:43.52	2nd place, silver medalist(s)
Roberto Maehler	K-1 1000 m	3:47.17	4 SF	3:52.49	2 FA	3:48.46	7
Heuer Silva Rodrigues; Roberto Maehler	K-2 500 m	1:34.87	3 SF	1:40.10	3 FA	1:34.79	6

Women

Athlete	Event	Heat		Semifinal		Final	
Athlete	Event	Time	Rank	Time	Rank	Time	Rank
Valdenice Conceição	C-1 200 m	49.10	3 SF	51.94	2 FA	49.10	5
Ana Paula Vergutz	K-1 500 m	1:59.03	4 SF	2:00.00	1 FA	1:55.41	5

== Cycling ==
Brazil qualified a total of 23 cyclists (11 men and 12 women). Brazil's team of 22 athletes was officially named on August 28, 2023.

=== BMX ===
Brazil qualified a team of six BMX riders (three men and three women) by virtue of their UCI world rankings.

Freestyle

Athlete	Event	Seeding		Final	
Athlete	Event	Score	Rank	Score	Rank
Gustavo Oliveira	Men's	74.58	5 Q	83.67	3rd place, bronze medalist(s)
Eduarda Bordignon	Women's	23.50	8	Did not advance	

Racing

Athlete	Event	Ranking round		Quarterfinal		Semifinal		Final	
Athlete	Event	Time	Rank	Points	Rank	Points	Rank	Time	Rank
Bruno Cogo	Men's	33.130	11 Q	7	1 Q	19	7	Did not advance	
Pedro Queiroz	Men's	33.010	8 Q	8	2 Q	21	7	Did not advance	
Paola Reis	Women's	36.600	6 Q	6	2 Q	8	3 Q	53.300	8
Priscilla Carnaval	Women's	37.810	10 Q	12	4 Q	12	4 Q	38.700	4

=== Mountain biking ===
Brazil qualified four mountain bikers (two men and two women) at the 2023 Pan American Championships and the 2022 South American Games.

Athlete	Event	Time	Rank
Ulan Bastos Galinski	Men's cross-country	1:20:31	4
José Gabriel Marques	Men's cross-country	1:20:13	3rd place, bronze medalist(s)
Raiza Goulão	Women's cross-country	1:24:57	3rd place, bronze medalist(s)
Karen Olímpio	Women's cross-country	1:27:00	5

=== Road ===
Brazil qualified a team of eight road cyclists (four men and four women) at the Pan American Championships.

Men

Athlete	Event	Time	Rank
Armando Camargo	Road race	3:48:31	30
Caio Godoy	Road race	3:48:29	25
Kacio Freitas	Road race	3:48:02	21
Nicolas Sessler	Road race	3:37:57	5

Women

Athlete	Event	Time	Rank
Ana Paula Casetta	Road race	3:05:40	28
Ana Paula Polegatch	Road race	2:54:56	14
Ana Vitória Magalhães	Road race	2:53:14	4
Talita da Luz	Road race	3:07:10	30
Ana Paula Polegatch	Time trial	28:08.19	10

=== Track ===
Brazil qualified a team of eight track cyclists (three men and five women) at the 2023 Pan American Track Cycling Championships.

Sprint

Athlete	Event	Qualification		Round of 16	Repechage 1	Quarterfinals	Semifinals	Final	
Athlete	Event	Time	Rank	Opposition Time	Opposition Time	Opposition Time	Opposition Time	Opposition Time	Rank
João Vitor da Silva	Men's individual	10.019	10 Q	Tjon En Fa (SUR); L	Ortega (COL); Browne (TTO); L 3rd place	Did not advance			
Carolina Barbosa	Women's individual	11.272	9 Q	Hankins (USA); L	Cardozo (COL); Molina (CHI); W 11.677	Barrios (CHI); W 11.656 / 11.650	Verdugo (MEX); L	Bronze medal final Marquardt (USA); L	4
Talita da Luz	Women's individual	12.956	19	Did not advance					

Keirin

Athlete	Event	Heats	Final
Athlete	Event	Rank	Rank
João Vitor da Silva	Men's	1 FA	6
Carolina Barbosa	Women's	5 FB	11

Madison

Athlete	Event	Points	Rank
Armando Camargo; Kacio Freitas	Men's	DNF	6
Alice Melo; Wellyda Rodrigues	Women's	13	4

Omnium

Athlete	Event	Scratch race		Tempo race		Elimination race		Points race		Total	
Athlete	Event	Points	Rank	Points	Rank	Points	Rank	Points	Rank	Points	Rank
Armando Camargo	Men's	40	1	24	9	22	10	12	8	98	7
Wellyda Rodrigues	Women's	28	7	18	12	30	6	3	8	79	10

== Diving ==
Brazil qualified eight divers (four men and four women) by finishing among the top 18 athletes of the respective events in the 2022 World Aquatics Championships.

Men

Athlete	Event	Preliminary		Final	
Athlete	Event	Score	Rank	Score	Rank
Rafael Fogaça	1 m springboard	330.30	8 Q	236.85	12
Rafael Max	1 m springboard	310.90	17	Did not advance	
Rafael Fogaça	3 m springboard	264.40	19	Did not advance	
Rafael Max	3 m springboard	328.00	16	Did not advance	
Diogo Silva	10 m platform	Did not start		—N/a	
Isaac Souza	10 m platform	391.80	6 Q	407.15	6
Rafael Fogaça; Rafael Max	3 m synchronized springboard	—N/a		267.81	8
Diogo Silva; Isaac Souza	10 m synchronized platform	—N/a		356.91	5

Women

Athlete	Event	Preliminary		Final	
Athlete	Event	Score	Rank	Score	Rank
Luana Lira	1 m springboard	203.35	13	Did not advance	
Rebeca Santana	1 m springboard	203.45	12 Q	177.45	12
Anna Lúcia dos Santos	3 m springboard	199.00	16	Did not advance	
Luana Lira	3 m springboard	208.85	15	Did not advance	
Giovanna Pedroso	10 m platform	Did not start		—N/a	
Ingrid Oliveira	10 m platform	318.30	4 Q	326.40	4
Anna Lúcia dos Santos; Luana Lira	3 m synchronized springboard	—N/a		243.30	6
Giovanna Pedroso; Ingrid Oliveira	10 m synchronized platform	—N/a		273.60	3rd place, bronze medalist(s)

== Equestrian ==
Brazil qualified a full team of 12 equestrians (four in Dressage, Eventing and Jumping).

=== Dressage ===
Athlete	Horse	Event	Prix St. Georges		Grand Prix Special			Grand Prix Freestyle	
Athlete	Horse	Event	Score	Rank	Score	Total	Rank	Score	Rank
João Victor Marcari Oliva	Feel Good VO	Individual	76.478	1	78.362	—N/a	2	86.160	2nd place, silver medalist(s)
Manuel Tavares de Almeida	Rosa Belle	Individual	69.369	13	68.894	—N/a	17	Did not advance	
Renderson Oliveira	Fogoso Campline	Individual	75.304	3	74.936	—N/a	5	80.095	5
Paulo César dos Santos	Fidel da Sasa JE	Individual	67.804	19	68.638	—N/a	18	71.175	15
João Victor Marcari Oliva; Manuel Tavares de Almeida; Paulo César dos Santos; Renderson Oliveira	See above	Team	221.151	2	222.192	443.343	2nd place, silver medalist(s)	—N/a	

=== Eventing ===
Athlete	Horse	Event	Dressage		Cross-country			Jumping			Total	
Athlete	Horse	Event	Result	Rank	Penalties	Total	Rank	Penalties	Total	Rank	Penalties	Rank
Carlos Parro	Safira	Individual	34	11	0	34	8	50	74.58	11	16	11
Márcio Jorge	Castle Howard Casanova	Individual	29.8	5	1.6	31.4	4	32.2	77.24	2	0.8	2nd place, silver medalist(s)
Rafael Losano	Withington	Individual	36.1	12	0	36.1	9	44.9	77.39	9	8.8	9
Ruy Fonseca	Bally Patrick SRS	Individual	36.7	14	19.6	56.3	13	56.7	76.88	12	0.4	12
Carlos Parro; Márcio Jorge; Rafael Losano; Ruy Fonseca	See above	Team	99.9	3	—N/a	101.5	2	—N/a	127.1	3	—N/a	3rd place, bronze medalist(s)

=== Jumping ===
Athlete	Horse	Event	Qualification											Final							
Athlete	Horse	Event	Round 1			Round 2.1			Round 2.2			Total		Round A			Round B			Total	
Athlete	Horse	Event	Faults	Result Time	Rank	Faults	Result Time	Rank	Faults	Result Time	Rank	Faults	Rank	Faults	Result Time	Rank	Faults	Result Time	Rank	Faults	Rank
Marlon Zanotelli	Deesse de Conquierie	Individual	0.00	72.87	1	21.00	85.73	36	RET		40	DNF	41	Did not advance							
Pedro Veniss	Nimrod De Muze Z	Individual	0.26	73.40	2	4.00	75.96	10	0.00	74.40	6	4.26	4 Q	8.00	69.47	11	4.00	58.56	3	16.26	5
Rodrigo Pessoa	Major Tom	Individual	4.55	81.98	18	4.00	76.18	16	8.00	73.30	25	16.55	32	Did not advance							
Stephan Barcha	Chevaux Primavera Montana Império Egípcio	Individual	4.06	80.99	14	0.00	75.27	4	0.00	75.02	12	4.06	3 Q	0.00	69.76	1	4.00	60.51	2	8.06	1st place, gold medalist(s)
Marlon Zanotelli; Pedro Veniss; Rodrigo Pessoa; Stephan Barcha	See above	Team	4.32	—N/a	1	8.00	—N/a	1	8.00	—N/a	3	20.32	3rd place, bronze medalist(s)	—N/a							

== Fencing ==
Brazil qualified a full team of 18 fencers (nine men and nine women), after all six teams finished at least in the top seven at the 2022 Pan American Fencing Championships in Asunción, Paraguay. The team was officially named on September 6, 2023.

Men

Athlete	Event	Pool Round		Round of 16	Quarterfinals	Semifinals	Final	
Athlete	Event	Victories	Seed	Opposition Score	Opposition Score	Opposition Score	Opposition Score	Rank
Alexandre Camargo	Individual épée	4V–2D	4 Q	Zhang (CAN); W 15–8	Quevedo (COL); W 15–7	Catalán (CHI); L 14–15	Did not advance	3rd place, bronze medalist(s)
Fabrízio Lazzarotto	Individual épée	3V–2D	9 Q	Imrek (USA); W 15–14	Catalán (CHI); L 10–15	Did not advance		
Guilherme Toldo	Individual foil	5V–0D	2 Q	Marques (BRA); W 15–12	Lopez (MEX); W 15–11	Chamley-Watson (USA); L 9–15	Did not advance	3rd place, bronze medalist(s)
Henrique Marques	Individual foil	1V–4D	15 Q	Toldo (BRA); L 12–15	Did not advance			
Enrico Pezzi	Individual sabre	2V–3D	12 Q	Monsalva (CHI); L 11–15	Did not advance			
Henrique Garrigós	Individual sabre	1V–4D	17	Did not advance				
Alexandre Camargo; Fabrízio Lazzarotto; Leopoldo Gubert	Team épée	—N/a			Argentina; L 27–32	5th–8th place classification Cuba; W 45–44	Fifth place match Chile; W 45–28	5
Guilherme Toldo; Henrique Marques; Pedro Marostega	Team foil	—N/a			Mexico; W 45–34	Canada; L 41–45	Bronze medal final Chile; W 45–36	3rd place, bronze medalist(s)
Enrico Pezzi; Henrique Garrigós; Fábio Salles	Team sabre	—N/a			Colombia; L 24–45	5th–8th place classification Mexico; L 37–45	Seventh place match Chile; W 45–30	7

Women

Athlete	Event	Pool Round		Round of 16	Quarterfinals	Semifinals	Final	
Athlete	Event	Victories	Seed	Opposition Score	Opposition Score	Opposition Score	Opposition Score	Rank
Nathalie Moellhausen	Individual épée	5V–0D	1 Q	Dyner (CRC); W 9–8	Di Tella (ARG); L 13–15	Did not advance		
Victória Vizeu	Individual épée	1V–4D	17	Did not advance				
Mariana Pistoia	Individual foil	4V–1D	5 Q	Aljure (COL); W 15–11	Gaete (CHI); W 15–11	Harvey (CAN); L 4–14	Did not advance	3rd place, bronze medalist(s)
Ana Beatriz Bulcão	Individual foil	1V–4D	12 Q	Gaete (CHI); L 11–15	Did not advance			
Karina Trois	Individual sabre	2V–3D	13 Q	Toledo (MEX); L 5–15	Did not advance			
Pietra Chierighini	Individual sabre	3V–2D	7 Q	Mustelier (CUB); L 10–15	Did not advance			
Nathalie Moellhausen; Victória Vizeu; Amanda Simeão	Team épée	—N/a			Colombia; W 45–34	Venezuela; W 45–35	Canada; W 45–40	1st place, gold medalist(s)
Mariana Pistoia; Ana Beatriz Bulcão; Carolina Brecheret	Team foil	—N/a			Chile; W 44–37	United States; L 15–45	Bronze medal final Mexico; L 40–45	4
Karina Trois; Luana Pekelman; Pietra Chierighini	Team sabre	—N/a			Argentina; L 39–45	5th–8th place classification Chile; W 45–29	Fifth place match Venezuela; W 45–33	5

== Field hockey ==
Summary

Team	Event	Preliminary round				Semifinal	Final / BM / Pl.	
Team	Event	Opposition Result	Opposition Result	Opposition Result	Rank	Opposition Result	Opposition Result	Rank
Brazil men's	Men's tournament	Canada; L 0–2	Trinidad and Tobago; W 2–1	United States; L 1–5	3	5th–8th place classification Peru; W 8–1	Fifth place match Mexico; W 2–0	5

=== Men's tournament ===
Brazil qualified a men's team of 16 athletes by finishing 6th at the 2022 Pan American Cup.

Preliminary round

Pos	Team	Pld	W	D	L	GF	GA	GD	Pts	Qualification
1	Canada	3	3	0	0	8	1	+7	9	Semi-finals
2	United States	3	2	0	1	12	4	+8	6	Semi-finals
3	Brazil	3	1	0	2	3	8	−5	3	5th–8th classification
4	Trinidad and Tobago	3	0	0	3	2	12	−10	0	5th–8th classification

Source: FIH
Rules for classification: 1) points; 2) matches won; 3) goal difference; 4) goals for; 5) head-to-head result; 6) field goals for.

25 October 2023
09:30

Canada	2–0	Brazil
Johnston 19'; Scholfield 41'	Report

Umpires:
Federico Silva (ARG)
Jonathan Altamirano (MEX)

27 October 2023
09:30

Brazil	2–1	Trinidad and Tobago
Patrocínio 2'; Vehrle-Smith 6'	Report	Pierre 33'

Umpires:
Reinier Díaz (CUB)
Hugo Romero (PAR)

29 October 2023
17:30

Brazil	1–5	United States
Lopez 43'	Report	Kokolakis 11'; A. Käppeler 13', 28', 30', 34'

Umpires:
Tyler Klenk (CAN)
Federico Silva (ARG)

Cross-overs

1 November 2023
15:45

Brazil	8–1	Peru
Patrocínio 5'; Paixão 16', 36'; Martins 25'; Vehrle-Smith 29'; Luduena 41'; Lopez 45'; Imer 51'	Report	Rehder 5'

Umpires:
Guillermo Poblete Luna (CHI)
Jonathan Altamirano (MEX)

Fifth place match

3 November 2023
11:45

Mexico	0–2	Brazil
	Report	Vehrle-Smith 26', 28'

Umpires:
Benjamin Peters (USA)
Fabián Romero (PAR)

== Football ==
Summary

Key:

- A.E.T – After extra time.
- P – Match decided by penalty-shootout.

Team	Event	Group Stage				Semifinal	Final / BM	
Team	Event	Opposition Score	Opposition Score	Opposition Score	Rank	Opposition Score	Opposition Score	Rank
Brazil men's	Men's tournament	United States; W 1–0	Colombia; W 2–0	Honduras; W 3–0	1 Q	Mexico; W 1–0	Chile; W 1–1 (a.e.t.) (4–2^{(p)})	1st place, gold medalist(s)

=== Men's tournament ===
Brazil qualified a men's team of 18 footballers by virtue of its campaign in the 2023 South American U-20 Championship.

Group stage

Pos	Team	Pld	W	D	L	GF	GA	GD	Pts	Qualification
1	Brazil	3	3	0	0	6	0	+6	9	Semi-finals
2	United States	3	2	0	1	4	2	+2	6	Semi-finals
3	Colombia	3	1	0	2	2	4	−2	3	Fifth place match
4	Honduras	3	0	0	3	1	7	−6	0	Seventh place match

Source: Santiago2023
23 October 2023
18:00

Brazil	1–0	United States
Miranda 86'	Report

Estadio Elías Figueroa Brander, Valparaíso
Referee: José Matos Uzcategui (Venezuela)

26 October 2023
20:00

Brazil	2–0	Colombia
Biro 16'; Pirani 51'	Report

Estadio Sausalito, Viña del Mar
Referee: José Burgos (Uruguay)

29 October 2023
13:00

Brazil	3–0	Honduras
Ronald 50'; Martins 54'; Lara 79'	Report

Estadio Sausalito, Viña del Mar
Referee: José Matos Uzcategui (Venezuela)

Semifinal

1 November 2023
20:00

Mexico	0–1	Brazil
	Report	Leone 2' (o.g.)

Estadio Sausalito, Viña del Mar
Referee: Bryan Loayza (Ecuador)

Gold medal match

4 November 2023
20:00

Chile	1–1 (a.e.t.)	Brazil
Guerrero 42'	Report	Ronald 83'
Penalties
Zaldivia (penalty scored); Villagra (penalty missed); Fuentes (penalty scored); Montes (penalty missed)	2–4	(penalty scored) Nascimento; (penalty scored) Ronald; (penalty missed) Figueiredo; (penalty scored) Miranda; (penalty scored) Mycael

Estadio Sausalito, Viña del Mar
Referee: Yender Herrera Toledo (Venezuela)

2023 Pan American Games Men's football tournament
winners

Brazil
5th title

== Golf ==
Brazil qualified a full team of four golfers (two men and two women).

Athlete	Event	Round 1	Round 2	Round 3	Round 4	Total		
Athlete	Event	Score	Score	Score	Score	Score	Par	Rank
Andrey Xavier	Men's individual	73	76	71	70	293	+5	=25
Rodrigo Lee	Men's individual	76	71	74	69	287	−1	20
Luiza Altmann	Women's individual	83	83	77	82	325	+37	32
Valentina Bosselmann	Women's individual	81	75	77	73	306	+18	20

== Gymnastics ==
=== Artistic ===
Brazil qualified a team of ten gymnasts in artistic (five men and five women) at the 2023 Pan American Artistic Gymnastics Championships.

Men

Team & Individual Qualification

Athlete	Event	Final							
Athlete	Event	Apparatus						Total	Rank
Athlete	Event	F	PH	R	V	PB	HB	Total	Rank
Arthur Nory	Team	14.066 Q	12.266	~~12.533~~	14.633 Q	~~13.633~~	14.100 Q	81.231	5 Q
Bernardo Actos	Team	—N/a	12.466	—N/a		14.133 Q	14.166 Q	—N/a	
Diogo Soares	Team	13.600	12.900	13.033	14.266	14.100 Q	14.033	81.932	3 Q
Patrick Sampaio	Team	~~12.966~~	—N/a	12.666	~~13.600~~	—N/a			
Yuri Guimarães	Team	14.100 Q	~~11.966~~	12.800	14.300 Q	13.766	~~13.600~~	80.532	8
Total	Team	41.766	37.632	38.499	43.199	41.999	42.299	245.394	3rd place, bronze medalist(s)

Qualification Legend: Q = Qualified to apparatus final

Individual Finals

Athlete	Event	Apparatus						Total	
Athlete	Event	F	PH	R	PB	V	HB	Score	Rank
Arthur Nory	All-around	13.833	11.933	12.500	10.833	14.333	14.500	77.932	9
Diogo Soares	All-around	13.400	13.766	13.233	13.833	14.033	13.600	81.865	2nd place, silver medalist(s)
Arthur Nory	Floor	13.933	—N/a						2nd place, silver medalist(s)
Yuri Guimarães	Floor	11.966	—N/a						8
Bernardo Actos	Parallel bars	—N/a			13.566	—N/a			4
Diogo Soares	Parallel bars	—N/a			12.566	—N/a			8
Arthur Nory	Vault	—N/a				14.466	—N/a		2nd place, silver medalist(s)
Yuri Guimarães	Vault	—N/a				14.133	—N/a		4
Arthur Nory	Horizontal bar	—N/a					14.333	—N/a	1st place, gold medalist(s)
Bernardo Actos	Horizontal bar	—N/a					14.133	—N/a	2nd place, silver medalist(s)

Women

Team & Individual Qualification

Athlete	Event	Final					
Athlete	Event	Apparatus				Total	Rank
Athlete	Event	V	UB	BB	F	Total	Rank
Carolyne Pedro	Team	~~12.766~~	~~10.400~~	—N/a	~~12.300~~	—N/a	
Flávia Saraiva	Team	14.000	13.633 Q	13.433 Q	13.400 Q	54.466	3 Q
Jade Barbosa	Team	13.800	10.933	~~12.600~~	13.333	50.666	8 Q
Julia Soares	Team	—N/a		12.666	13.400 Q	—N/a	
Rebeca Andrade	Team	15.100 Q	14.300 Q	13.566 Q	—N/a		
Total	Team	42.900	38.866	39.665	40.133	161.564	2nd place, silver medalist(s)

Qualification Legend: Q = Qualified to apparatus final

Individual Finals

Athlete	Event	Apparatus				Total	
Athlete	Event	F	BB	V	UB	Score	Rank
Flávia Saraiva	All-around	12.900	14.166	13.966	13.533	54.565	2nd place, silver medalist(s)
Jade Barbosa	All-around	13.433	12.900	13.900	13.100	53.333	4
Flávia Saraiva	Floor	13.733	—N/a				2nd place, silver medalist(s)
Julia Soares	Floor	13.633	—N/a				4
Flávia Saraiva	Balance beam	—N/a	14.033	—N/a			2nd place, silver medalist(s)
Rebeca Andrade	Balance beam	—N/a	14.166	—N/a			1st place, gold medalist(s)
Rebeca Andrade	Vault	—N/a		14.983	—N/a		1st place, gold medalist(s)
Flávia Saraiva	Uneven bars	—N/a			13.733	—N/a	3rd place, bronze medalist(s)
Rebeca Andrade	Uneven bars	—N/a			14.333	—N/a	2nd place, silver medalist(s)

=== Rhythmic ===
Brazil qualified three individual gymnasts and five gymnasts for the group event in rhythmic at the 2023 Pan American Rhythmic Gymnastics Championships and the 2021 Junior Pan American Games.

Individual

Athlete	Event	Apparatus				Total	
Athlete	Event	Ball	Clubs	Hoop	Ribbon	Score	Rank
Bárbara Domingos	All-around	33.200 Q	32.200 Q	32.000 Q	32.150 Q	129.550	1st place, gold medalist(s)
Geovanna Santos	All-around	30.850 Q	29.900	28.650	29.550	118.950	6
Maria Eduarda Alexandre	All-around	30.750	32.350 Q	33.550 Q	30.600 Q	127.250	3rd place, bronze medalist(s)
Bárbara Domingos	Ball	33.000	—N/a				1st place, gold medalist(s)
Geovanna Santos	Ball	31.650	—N/a				2nd place, silver medalist(s)
Bárbara Domingos	Clubs	—N/a	31.000	—N/a			2nd place, silver medalist(s)
Maria Eduarda Alexandre	Clubs	—N/a	33.000	—N/a			1st place, gold medalist(s)
Bárbara Domingos	Hoop	—N/a		32.550	—N/a		2nd place, silver medalist(s)
Maria Eduarda Alexandre	Hoop	—N/a		32.700	—N/a		1st place, gold medalist(s)
Bárbara Domingos	Ribbon	—N/a			31.750	—N/a	1st place, gold medalist(s)
Maria Eduarda Alexandre	Ribbon	—N/a			31.600	—N/a	2nd place, silver medalist(s)

Group

Athlete	Event	Apparatus		Total	
Athlete	Event	5 hoops	3 ribbons + 2 balls	Score	Rank
Bárbara Urquiza; Victória Borges; Gabriella Coradine; Giovanna Oliveira; Nicole Pircio	All-around	35.400 Q	29.050 Q	64.450	1st place, gold medalist(s)
Bárbara Urquiza; Victória Borges; Gabriella Coradine; Giovanna Oliveira; Nicole Pircio	5 hoops	35.850	—N/a		1st place, gold medalist(s)
Bárbara Urquiza; Victória Borges; Gabriella Coradine; Giovanna Oliveira; Nicole Pircio	3 ribbons + 2 balls	—N/a	31.800	—N/a	1st place, gold medalist(s)

=== Trampoline ===
Brazil qualified four gymnasts in trampoline (two men and two women) at the 2023 Pan American Trampoline and Tumbling Championships and the 2021 Junior Pan American Games.

Men

Athlete	Event	Qualification		Final	
Athlete	Event	Score	Rank	Score	Rank
Rayan Dutra	Individual	57.610	4 Q	58.720	2nd place, silver medalist(s)
Lucas Tobias	Individual	53.920	9	Did not advance	
Lucas Tobias; Rayan Dutra	Synchronized	49.140	3 Q	47.700	3rd place, bronze medalist(s)

Women

Athlete	Event	Qualification		Final	
Athlete	Event	Score	Rank	Score	Rank
Alice Gomes	Individual	53.480	4 Q	52.540	5
Camilla Gomes	Individual	54.590	1 Q	53.840	2nd place, silver medalist(s)
Alice Gomes; Camilla Gomes	Synchronized	45.980	2 Q	46.140	2nd place, silver medalist(s)

== Handball ==
Summary

Team	Event	Group stage				Semifinal	Final / BM / Pl.	
Team	Event	Opposition Result	Opposition Result	Opposition Result	Rank	Opposition Result	Opposition Result	Rank
Brazil men's	Men's tournament	Mexico; W 51–19	Dominican Republic; W 36–20	Chile; W 30–28	1 Q	United States; W 40–27	Argentina; L 25–32	2nd place, silver medalist(s)
Brazil women's	Women's tournament	Paraguay; W 27–15	Uruguay; W 28–9	Cuba; W 49–11	1 Q	Chile; W 30–10	Argentina; W 30–18	1st place, gold medalist(s)

=== Men's tournament ===
Brazil qualified a men's team (of 14 athletes) by winning the 2021 Junior Pan American Games.

Preliminary round

Pos	Team	Pld	W	D	L	GF	GA	GD	Pts	Qualification
1	Brazil	3	3	0	0	117	67	+50	6	Semifinals
2	Chile (H)	3	2	0	1	90	72	+18	4	Semifinals
3	Mexico	3	1	0	2	66	102	−36	2	5–8th place semifinals
4	Dominican Republic	3	0	0	3	60	92	−32	0	5–8th place semifinals

Source: Santiago 2023
Rules for classification: 1) points; 2) head-to-head points; 3) head-to-head goal difference; 4) head-to-head goals scored; 5) goal difference; 6) goals scored; 7) draw.
(H) Hosts

30 October 2023; 17:30	Brazil	51–19	Mexico	Gimnasio Polideportivo de Viña del Mar; Referees: Araújo, Perdomo (URU)
30 October 2023; 17:30	Dupoux 13	(25–9)	Rodríguez 6	Gimnasio Polideportivo de Viña del Mar; Referees: Araújo, Perdomo (URU)
30 October 2023; 17:30	1× (yellow card) 2× (suspension)	Report	3× (suspension)	Gimnasio Polideportivo de Viña del Mar; Referees: Araújo, Perdomo (URU)

31 October 2023; 17:30	Dominican Republic	20–36	Brazil	Gimnasio Polideportivo de Viña del Mar; Referees: Reyes, Zuñiga (CUB)
31 October 2023; 17:30	Beras 6	(11–18)	Hackbarth 7	Gimnasio Polideportivo de Viña del Mar; Referees: Reyes, Zuñiga (CUB)
31 October 2023; 17:30	1× (suspension)	Report		Gimnasio Polideportivo de Viña del Mar; Referees: Reyes, Zuñiga (CUB)

1 November 2023; 20:00	Chile	28–30	Brazil	Gimnasio Polideportivo de Viña del Mar; Referees: Sosa, Lemes (URU)
1 November 2023; 20:00	Er. Feuchtmann 10	(12–15)	Dupoux, Langaro 6	Gimnasio Polideportivo de Viña del Mar; Referees: Sosa, Lemes (URU)
1 November 2023; 20:00	6× (suspension)	Report	3× (yellow card) 5× (suspension)	Gimnasio Polideportivo de Viña del Mar; Referees: Sosa, Lemes (URU)

Semifinal

3 November 2023; 17:30	Brazil	40–27	United States	Gimnasio Polideportivo de Viña del Mar; Referees: Araujo, Perdomo (URU)
3 November 2023; 17:30	Dupoux 8	(23–13)	Hoddersen 6	Gimnasio Polideportivo de Viña del Mar; Referees: Araujo, Perdomo (URU)
3 November 2023; 17:30	3× (suspension)	Report	1× (yellow card) 1× (suspension)	Gimnasio Polideportivo de Viña del Mar; Referees: Araujo, Perdomo (URU)

Gold medal match

4 November 2023; 19:30	Brazil	25–32	Argentina	Gimnasio Polideportivo de Viña del Mar; Referees: Hansen, Madsen (DEN)
4 November 2023; 19:30	Dupoux 6	(14–16)	Bono 6	Gimnasio Polideportivo de Viña del Mar; Referees: Hansen, Madsen (DEN)
4 November 2023; 19:30	3× (suspension) 1× (red card)	Report	4× (yellow card) 1× (suspension) 1× (red card)	Gimnasio Polideportivo de Viña del Mar; Referees: Hansen, Madsen (DEN)

=== Women's tournament ===
Brazil qualified a women's team (of 14 athletes) by winning the 2022 South American Games.

Preliminary round

Pos	Team	Pld	W	D	L	GF	GA	GD	Pts	Qualification
1	Brazil	3	3	0	0	104	35	+69	6	Semifinals
2	Paraguay	3	1	0	2	68	76	−8	2 (Note: Paraguay 2 Pts, +4 GD; Cuba 2 Pts, –1 GD; Uruguay 2 Pts, –3 GD)	Semifinals
3	Cuba	3	1	0	2	62	101	−39	2	5–8th place semifinals
4	Uruguay	3	1	0	2	53	75	−22	2	5–8th place semifinals

Source: Santiago 2023
Rules for classification: 1) points; 2) head-to-head points; 3) head-to-head goal difference; 4) head-to-head goals scored; 5) goal difference; 6) goals scored; 7) draw.
Notes:

24 October 2023; 12:30	Brazil	27–15	Paraguay	Gimnasio Polideportivo de Viña del Mar; Referees: Reyes, Zuñiga (CUB)
24 October 2023; 12:30	four players 4	(15–7)	Insfran 6	Gimnasio Polideportivo de Viña del Mar; Referees: Reyes, Zuñiga (CUB)
24 October 2023; 12:30	1× (yellow card) 4× (suspension)	Report	2× (suspension)	Gimnasio Polideportivo de Viña del Mar; Referees: Reyes, Zuñiga (CUB)

25 October 2023; 10:00	Uruguay	9–28	Brazil	Gimnasio Polideportivo de Viña del Mar; Referees: Correa, Conberse (ARG)
25 October 2023; 10:00	Bianco 6	(5–17)	Araújo 5	Gimnasio Polideportivo de Viña del Mar; Referees: Correa, Conberse (ARG)
25 October 2023; 10:00	2× (suspension)	Report	2× (suspension)	Gimnasio Polideportivo de Viña del Mar; Referees: Correa, Conberse (ARG)

26 October 2023; 12:30	Brazil	49–11	Cuba	Gimnasio Polideportivo de Viña del Mar; Referees: Sosa, Lemes (URU)
26 October 2023; 12:30	Castro 10	(26–6)	Toledo 3	Gimnasio Polideportivo de Viña del Mar; Referees: Sosa, Lemes (URU)
26 October 2023; 12:30	4× (suspension)	Report	3× (suspension)	Gimnasio Polideportivo de Viña del Mar; Referees: Sosa, Lemes (URU)

Semifinal

28 October 2023; 20:00	Brazil	30–10	Chile	Gimnasio Polideportivo de Viña del Mar; Referees: Conberse, Correa (ARG)
28 October 2023; 20:00	Castro 11	(19–8)	Paul 3	Gimnasio Polideportivo de Viña del Mar; Referees: Conberse, Correa (ARG)
28 October 2023; 20:00	1× (yellow card) 2× (suspension)	Report	1× (yellow card) 1× (suspension)	Gimnasio Polideportivo de Viña del Mar; Referees: Conberse, Correa (ARG)

Gold medal match

29 October 2023; 20:30	Argentina	18–30	Brazil	Gimnasio Polideportivo de Viña del Mar; Referees: Sosa, Lemes (URU)
29 October 2023; 20:30	Pizzo 6	(7–16)	da Rocha 7	Gimnasio Polideportivo de Viña del Mar; Referees: Sosa, Lemes (URU)
29 October 2023; 20:30	1× (yellow card) 3× (suspension) 1× (red card)	Report	1× (yellow card) 5× (suspension)	Gimnasio Polideportivo de Viña del Mar; Referees: Sosa, Lemes (URU)

== Judo ==
Brazil has qualified 19 judokas (nine men and ten women). The team was officially named on September 18, 2023.

Men

Athlete	Event	Round of 16	Quarterfinals	Semifinals	Repechage	Final / BM	
Athlete	Event	Opposition Result	Opposition Result	Opposition Result	Opposition Result	Opposition Result	Rank
Michel Augusto	−60 kg	Bye	Castro (ESA); W 01–00	Sancho (CRC); W 01S1–00S2	Bye	Rojas (COL); W 10S2–00S3	1st place, gold medalist(s)
Willian Lima	−66 kg	Bye	Garcia (VEN); L 01S2–10	Did not advance	Hernández (COL); W 01S2–00S2	Bronze medal final Postigos (PER); W 10–00	3rd place, bronze medalist(s)
Daniel Cargnin	−73 kg	Etchechury (ARG); W 10S1–00S1	Bouchard (CAN); W 01S1–00S2	Sandoval (COL); W 10S1–00S3	Bye	Falcão (BRA); L WDR	2nd place, silver medalist(s)
Gabriel Falcão	−73 kg	Yonezuka (USA); W WDR	Martínez (MEX); W 10–00S2	Tornal (DOM); W 10S1–00S3	Bye	Cargnin (BRA); W WDR	1st place, gold medalist(s)
Guilherme Schimidt	−81 kg	Bye	Popovici (CAN); W 10–00S2	del Orbe (DOM); W 10S2–00S2	Bye	Perez (CHI); W 10–00	1st place, gold medalist(s)
Rafael Macedo	−90 kg	Bye	Paez (VEN); W 10S1–00S2	Florentino (DOM); W 10S1–00	Bye	Silva (CUB); L 00S3–10S1	2nd place, silver medalist(s)
Leonardo Gonçalves	−100 kg	Bye	Cardona (CUB); W 10–00S1	Shady (CUB); L 00S1–10S1	Bye	Bronze medal final Balanta (COL); L 00–01S2	=5
Kayo Santos	−100 kg	Esquivel (MEX); W 10–00	Balanta (COL); W 10S1–00S1	Briceño (CHI); L 00–10S1	Bye	Bronze medal final Cardona (CUB); W 10–00	3rd place, bronze medalist(s)
Rafael Silva	+100 kg	Amezquita (VEN); W 10–00S1	Granda (CUB); L 10S2–00S1	Did not advance	Del Sol (MEX); W 10–00S1	Bronze medal final Deschênes (CAN); W 10S1–00S1	3rd place, bronze medalist(s)

Women

Athlete	Event	Round of 16	Quarterfinals	Semifinals	Repechage	Final / BM	
Athlete	Event	Opposition Result	Opposition Result	Opposition Result	Opposition Result	Opposition Result	Rank
Amanda Lima	−48 kg	Bye	Ortega (ECU); W 10–00	Carrilo (MEX); L 00–10	Bye	Bronze medal final Vargas (CHI); W 10–00	3rd place, bronze medalist(s)
Alexia Nascimento	−48 kg	Gimenez (VEN); W 10–00	Perafan (ARG); W 10S1–00S3	Lasso (COL); W 01–00	Bye	Carrilo (MEX); W 10S2–00S3	1st place, gold medalist(s)
Larissa Pimenta	−52 kg	Bye	González (CHI); W 10–00	Delgado (USA); W 10S1–00S2	Bye	Claro (MEX); W 10–00	1st place, gold medalist(s)
Rafaela Silva	−57 kg	Bye	Jiménez (PAN); W 10–00	Villalba (COL); W 10S1–00S1	Bye	Gómez (ARG); W 10–00	1st place, gold medalist(s)
Ketleyn Quadros	−63 kg	Bye	Golden (USA); W 10–00S3	Harris (CAN); L 00S1–10S1	Bye	Bronze medal final Mera (COL); W 01S1–00	3rd place, bronze medalist(s)
Luana Carvalho	−70 kg	Alamin (USA); W 10S1–00S1	Ramírez (ECU); L 01S1–10S2	Did not advance	Delvecchio (ARG); W 10S1–00	Bronze medal final Rodríguez (VEN); L 00–10	=5
Aléxia Castilhos	−70 kg	Bustos (MEX); W 10–00	Rodríguez (VEN); L 00S1–11	Did not advance	Bonilla (COL); W 10–00S1	Bronze medal final Ramírez (ECU); L 00S2–10S2	=5
Eliza Ramos	−78 kg	Colón (PUR); L 00–10S1	Did not advance				
Samanta Soares	−78 kg	Bye	Cardona (CUB); W 11–00	Chala (VEN); W 10S1–01	Bye	Colón (PUR); W 01S1–00S1	1st place, gold medalist(s)
Beatriz Souza	+78 kg	Quevedo (CHI); W 10–00S1	Ortíz (CUB); L 00S3–10S1	Did not advance	Bolivar (PER); W 10–00S1	Bronze medal final Urdaneta (VEN); W 10–00S2	3rd place, bronze medalist(s)

Mixed

Athlete	Event	Round of 16	Quarterfinal	Semifinal	Repechage	Final / BM	
Athlete	Event	Opposition Result	Opposition Result	Opposition Result	Opposition Result	Opposition Result	Rank
Willian Lima; Daniel Cargnin; Gabriel Falcão; Leonardo Gonçalves; Guilherme Schimidt; Rafael Macedo; Rafael Silva; Larissa Pimenta; Rafaela Silva; Aléxia Castilhos; Luana Carvalho; Samanta Soares; Beatriz Souza	Team	Bye	Venezuela; W 4–1	Colombia; W 4–0	Bye	Cuba; L 3–4	2nd place, silver medalist(s)

== Karate ==
Brazil qualified a team of 10 karatekas (six men and four women) in the 2021 Junior Pan American Games, 2022 South American Games and the 2023 Pan American Championships.

Kumite

Men

Athlete	Event	Round robin					Semifinal	Final	
Athlete	Event	Opposition Result	Opposition Result	Opposition Result	Opposition Result	Rank	Opposition Result	Opposition Result	Rank
Douglas Brose	−60 kg	Ruiz (USA); W 3–0	Fernández (COL); W 3–3	De La Roca (EAI); W 1–0	—N/a	1 Q	Díaz (CUB); L 2–5	Did not advance	3rd place, bronze medalist(s)
Vinícius Figueira	−67 kg	Madera (VEN); L 0–2	Esparza (MEX); W 4–3	Fuentes (CHI); L 3–4	—N/a	3	Did not advance		
Alisson Sobrinho	−75 kg	Landázuri (COL); L 2–7	Maldonado (EAI); L 1–5	Kasturi (USA); W 3–1	Rodríguez (CHI); L 0–0	4	Did not advance		
Giovani Salgado	+84 kg	Timmermans (ARU); L 1–2	Oporta (NCA); W 4–2	Lenis (COL); W 5–4	—N/a	2 Q	Rojas (CHI); L 2–2	Did not advance	3rd place, bronze medalist(s)
Lucas Miranda	+84 kg	Molina (ARG); W 9–0	Castillo (DOM); W 6–3	Rojas (CHI); L 4–5	Irr (USA); T 1–1	2 Q	Timmermans (ARU); W 7–1	Rojas (CHI); L 1–2	2nd place, silver medalist(s)

Women

Athlete	Event	Round robin					Semifinal	Final	
Athlete	Event	Opposition Result	Opposition Result	Opposition Result	Opposition Result	Rank	Opposition Result	Opposition Result	Rank
Kelly Fernandes	−55 kg	Sanchez (MEX); W 6–4	Torres (CUB); L 2–10	Allen (USA); T 4–4	—N/a	1 Q	Toro (CHI); L 0–4	Did not advance	3rd place, bronze medalist(s)
Bárbara Rodrigues	−68 kg	Aponte (BOL); W 0–0	Bratic (CAN); W 3–1	Cuervo (VEN); W 1–0	Campos (MEX); W 10–0	1 Q	Lingl (USA); W 3–1	Mosquera (COL); W 4–2	1st place, gold medalist(s)
Brenda Padilha	+68 kg	Rodríguez (DOM); W 5–3	Fernández (PER); W 2–0	Torres (COL); W 4–3	González (CHI); W 5–1	1 Q	Quintal (MEX); L 2–3	Did not advance	3rd place, bronze medalist(s)

Kata

Athlete	Event	Round robin				Final / BM	
Athlete	Event	Opposition Result	Opposition Result	Opposition Result	Rank	Opposition Result	Rank
Bruno Conde	Men's individual	Leocadio (VEN); L 38.60–39.80	Luengo (CHI); W 39.50–36.90	Wong (PER); L 38.30–39.70	3 FB	Bronze medal final Aracena (DOM); L 39.20–39.70	4
Nicole Yonamine	Women's individual	Dimitrova (DOM); W WDR	Gallo (CHI); W 39.30–38.10	Kokumai (USA); L 39.70–41.30	2 FB	Bronze medal final Armada (VEN); L 40.20–40.30	4

== Modern pentathlon ==
Brazil qualified six modern pentathletes (three men and three women). The team was officially named on April 28, 2023.

Men

Athlete	Event	Fencing ranking round (Épée one touch)			Semifinal									Final												
Athlete	Event	Fencing ranking round (Épée one touch)			Fencing	Swimming (200 m freestyle)			Shooting / Running (10 m laser pistol / 3000 m cross-country)			Total		Fencing	Swimming			Riding (Show jumping)				Shooting / Running			Total	
Athlete	Event	V – D	Rank	MP points	BP	Time	Rank	MP points	Time	Rank	MP points	MP points	Rank	BP	Time	Rank	MP points	Time	Faults	Rank	MP points	Time	Rank	MP points	MP points	Rank
Danilo Fagundes	Individual	17–13	12	234	8	2:17.21	10	276	10:48.80	3	652	1162	4 Q	8	2:18.78	17	273	EL			0	10:16.80	5	684	1183	16
Gabriel Sasaki	Individual	19–11	5	242	4	2:14.71	7	281	11:29.80	3	611	1134	3 Q	4	2:14.24	11	282	EL			0	11:23.10	17	617	1137	18
William Muinhos	Individual	15–15	18	214	0	2:15.49	8	280	11:27.10	9	613	1107	9 Q	0	2:17.95	16	275	52.00	0	3	300	10:59.20	16	641	1430	12
Danilo Fagundes; Gabriel Sasaki	Relay	20–20	6	218	—N/a									0	2:01.77	9	307	EL			0	12:07.10	5	573	1098	10

Women

Athlete	Event	Fencing ranking round (Épée one touch)			Semifinal									Final												
Athlete	Event	Fencing ranking round (Épée one touch)			Fencing	Swimming (200 m freestyle)			Shooting / Running (10 m laser pistol / 3000 m cross-country)			Total		Fencing	Swimming			Riding (Show jumping)				Shooting / Running			Total	
Athlete	Event	V – D	Rank	MP points	BP	Time	Rank	MP points	Time	Rank	MP points	MP points	Rank	BP	Time	Rank	MP points	Time	Faults	Rank	MP points	Time	Rank	MP points	MP points	Rank
Isabela Abreu	Individual	19–13	9	232	0	2:33.15	10	244	12:59.10	8	521	997	8 Q	12	2:34.55	12	241	56.00	7	14	293	12:45.20	13	535	1313	9
Marcela Mello	Individual	12–20	25	190	6	2:26.29	4	258	12:08.80	4	572	1026	4 Q	DNS	DNS			EL			0	DNS			0	18
Stephany Saraiva	Individual	19–13	11	234	2	2:36.38	10	238	12:40.60	8	540	1012	7 Q	2	2:38.20	14	234	55.09	7	15	293	12:56.90	14	524	1283	12
Isabela Abreu; Stephany Saraiva	Relay	21–15	4	234	—N/a									4	2:18.07	5	274	EL			0	14:09.30	3	451	959	6

Mixed

Athlete	Event	Fencing (Épée one touch)				Swimming (200 m freestyle)			Riding (Show jumping)				Shooting / Running (10 m laser pistol / 3000 m cross-country)			Total	
Athlete	Event	V – D	Rank	MP points	BP	Time	Rank	MP points	Time	Faults	Rank	MP points	Time	Rank	MP points	MP points	Rank
William Muinhos; Isabela Abreu	Relay	26–18	2	230	0	2:08.10	7	294	2:38.00	69	6	231	13:49.40	6	471	1226	6

== Roller sports ==
=== Artistic ===
Brazil qualified a team of two artistic skaters (one man and one woman).

Athlete	Event	Short program		Long program		Total	
Athlete	Event	Score	Rank	Score	Rank	Score	Rank
Erik Medziukevicius	Men's	73.61	1	114.6	2	188.21	1st place, gold medalist(s)
Bianca Ameixeiro	Women's	45.52	4	78.48	1	124.00	2nd place, silver medalist(s)

=== Speed ===
Brazil qualified one male speed skater after winning the 2021 Junior Pan American Games and one female speed skater through the 2022 South American Games.

Men

Athlete	Event	Qualification		Semifinal		Final	
Athlete	Event	Time	Rank	Time	Rank	Time	Rank
Guilherme Rocha	200 m time trial	—N/a				17.765	4
Guilherme Rocha	500 m + distance	43.522	6 Q	43.758	2 Q	DSQ	4
Guilherme Rocha	1000 m sprint	1:24.635	8 q	—N/a		1:27.730	8

Women

Athlete	Event	Qualification		Semifinal		Final	
Athlete	Event	Time	Rank	Time	Rank	Time	Rank
Sofia Scheibler	200 m time trial	—N/a				20.927	12
Sofia Scheibler	1000 m sprint	1:37.173	12	—N/a		Did not advance	
Sofia Scheibler	10,000 m elimination	—N/a				EL	10

=== Skateboarding ===
Brazil qualified a team of six skateboarders (three men and three women).

Men

Athlete	Event	Final	
Athlete	Event	Score	Rank
Augusto Akio	Park	84.12	2nd place, silver medalist(s)
Lucas Rabelo	Street	264.45	1st place, gold medalist(s)
Gabryel Aguilar	Street	135.91	8

Women

Athlete	Event	Final	
Athlete	Event	Score	Rank
Raicca Ventura	Park	82.54	2nd place, silver medalist(s)
Pâmela Rosa	Street	211.34	2nd place, silver medalist(s)
Rayssa Leal	Street	236.98	1st place, gold medalist(s)

== Rowing ==
Brazil qualified a team of 17 rowers (seven men and ten women).

Men

Athlete	Event	Heat		Repechage		Semifinal		Final A/B	
Athlete	Event	Time	Rank	Time	Rank	Time	Rank	Time	Rank
Lucas Verthein	Single sculls	7:23.12	1 SA/B	Bye		7:04.07	1 FA	6:58.76	1st place, gold medalist(s)
Piedro Tuchtenhagen; Tomás Levy	Double sculls	6:52.59	3 SA/B	Bye		6:34.14	1 FA	6:36.06	5
Alef Fontoura; Bernardo Boggian	Pair	7:04.67	2 R	6:50.35	2 FA	—N/a		6:46.17	6
Marcelo Almeida; Uncas Batista	Lightweight double sculls	7:09.46	5 R	6:39.28	1 FA	—N/a		6:29.32	4

Women

Athlete	Event	Heat		Repechage		Semifinal		Final A/B	
Athlete	Event	Time	Rank	Time	Rank	Time	Rank	Time	Rank
Beatriz Tavares	Single sculls	8:20.40	1 SA/B	Bye		7:46.88	1 FA	7:46.73	2nd place, silver medalist(s)
Chloé Delazeri; Nathalia Barbosa	Double sculls	7:39.42	2 R	7:22.08	2 FA	—N/a		7:24.95	6
Beatriz Tavares; Chloé Delazeri; Nathalia Barbosa; Thalita Soares	Quadruple sculls	—N/a						6:41.18	4
Maria Clara Lewenkopf; Milena Viana	Pair	7:43.64	3 R	7:29.61	1 FA	—N/a		7:22.63	4
Dayane Pacheco; Maria Clara Lewenkopf; Milena Viana; Shaiane Ucker	Four	—N/a						6:52.95	5
Antônia Emanuelle Motta; Isabella Ibeas	Lightweight double sculls	7:26.15	3 R	7:30.23	4 FB	—N/a		7:30.05	7
Antônia Emanuelle Motta; Chloé Delazeri; Dayane Pacheco; Isabella Ibeas; Maria Clara Lewenkopf; Milena Viana; Nathalia Barbosa; Shaiane Ucker; Isabelle Camargos	Eight	—N/a						6:27.90	5

Mixed

Athlete	Event	Heat		Repechage		Semifinal		Final A/B	
Athlete	Event	Time	Rank	Time	Rank	Time	Rank	Time	Rank
Alef Fontoura; Bernardo Boggian; Piedro Tuchtenhagen; Tomás Levy; Dayane Pacheco; Maria Clara Lewenkopf; Milena Viana; Shaiane Ucker; Isabella Ibeas	Eight	6:19.86	4 R	6:08.39	4 FA	—N/a		6:03.80	5

== Rugby sevens ==
Summary

Team	Event	Group stage				Semifinal	Final / BM / Pl.	
Team	Event	Opposition Result	Opposition Result	Opposition Result	Rank	Opposition Result	Opposition Result	Rank
Brazil men's	Men's tournament	Canada; L 12–22	United States; L 5–17	Mexico; W 29–0	3	5th–8th place classification Jamaica; W 27–14	Fifth place match Uruguay; L 14–15	6
Brazil women's	Women's tournament	Mexico; W 47–0	Chile; W 41–0	Canada; L 21–29	2 Q	United States; L 0–36	Bronze medal match Colombia; W 45–0	3rd place, bronze medalist(s)

=== Men's tournament ===
Brazil qualified a men's team (of 12 athletes) at the 2022 Sudamérica Rugby Sevens.

Pool stage

Pos	Team	Pld	W	D	L	PF	PA	PD	Pts	Qualification
1	United States	3	3	0	0	84	17	+67	9	Semifinals
2	Canada	3	2	0	1	69	36	+33	7	Semifinals
3	Brazil	3	1	0	2	46	39	+7	5	5–8th place semifinals
4	Mexico	3	0	0	3	12	119	−107	3	5–8th place semifinals

Source: Santiago 2023
Rules for classification: 1) Points; 2) Head-to-head result; 3) Point difference; 4) Points scored; 5) draw.

3 November 2023
12:05

Canada	22–12	Brazil
Try: Richard (3) 0', 2', 6'; Hager 3'; Con: Kratz (1/2) 1'	Report	Try: Alves de Morais 5'; Duque 1'; Con: Da Silva (1/1) 1'

Estadio Municipal de La Pintana
Referee: Francisco González (Uruguay)

3 November 2023
16:40

United States	17–5	Brazil
Try: Wendling 6'; Vi 1'; Hardrict 3'; Con: Lacamp (1/3) 1'	Report	Try: Silveira 4'

Estadio Municipal de La Pintana
Referee: Talal-Azmat Chaudhry (Canada)

3 November 2023
20:25

Brazil	29–0	Mexico
Try: Alves 3'; Duque 5'; Teixeira 2'; Menezez 4'; Con: Duque (2/3) 3', 5'; Da Silva 7'	Report

Estadio Municipal de La Pintana
Referee: Francisca Gonzalez (Uruguay)

5th–8th place classification

4 November 2023
10:50

Jamaica	14–27	Brazil
Try: Rampton 3'; Fraser 5'; Con: Franklyn (2/2) 3', 6'	Report	Try: Da Silva 2'; Claudio 6'; Menezez (3) 1', 4', 7'; Con: Rainho (1/1) 7'

Estadio Municipal de La Pintana
Referee: Francisco Gonzalez (Uruguay)

Fifth place match

4 November 2023
16:15

Uruguay	15–14	Brazil
Try: Grille 0'; Basso 5'; Amaya 6'	Report	Try: Teixeira 3'; Claudio 6'; Con: Duque (2/2) 4', 6'

Estadio Municipal de La Pintana
Referee: Frank Méndez (Chile)

=== Women's tournament ===
Brazil qualified a women's team (of 12 athletes) by winning the 2022 Sudamérica Rugby Women's Sevens.

Pool stage

Pos	Team	Pld	W	D	L	PF	PA	PD	Pts	Qualification
1	Canada	3	3	0	0	134	21	+113	9	Semifinals
2	Brazil	3	2	0	1	109	29	+80	7	Semifinals
3	Chile	3	1	0	2	27	82	−55	5	5–8th place semifinals
4	Mexico	3	0	0	3	5	143	−138	3	5–8th place semifinals

Source: Santiago 2023
Rules for classification: 1) Points; 2) Head-to-head result; 3) Point difference; 4) Points scored; 5) draw.

3 November 2023
10:50

Brazil	47–0	Mexico
Try: Furtado (4) 1', 4', 1', 7'; Costa 2'; Zanellato 7'; Soares 4'; Con: Campos (3/3) 1', 4', 7'; Nicolau (2/2) 2', 4'; Lima (1/1) 1'	Report

Estadio Municipal de La Pintana
Referee: Gonzalo de Achaval (Argentina)

3 November 2023
16:15

Chile	0–41	Brazil
	Report	Try: Costa 1'; Silva 4'; Gomes 5'; Nicolau 7'; Lima (3) 2', 4', 6'; Con: Campos (2/4) 1', 4'; Nicolau (1/2) 2'

Estadio Municipal de La Pintana
Referee: Kristine Lovatt (Canada)

3 November 2023
19:10

Canada	29–21	Brazil
Try: Norsten 0'; Logan 5'; Williams (2) 2', 4'; Romeo 6'; Con: Hogan-Rochester (2/3) 5', 3'	Report	Try: Nicolau 3'; Campos 6'; Silva 1'; Con: Nicolau (3/3) 4', 7', 1'

Estadio Municipal de La Pintana
Referee: Frank Méndez (Chile)

Semifinal

4 November 2023
12:05

United States	36–0	Brazil
Try: Sedrick 1'; Kirshe 3'; Maker 5'; Rovetti 4'; Sullivan 7'; Con: Olsen (2/4) 1', 5'; Heavirland (1/2) 7'	Report

Estadio Municipal de La Pintana
Referee: Talal-Ahmat Chaudhry (Canada)

Bronze medal match

4 November 2023
16:40

Brazil	45–0	Colombia
Try: Costa (3) 1', 4', 8'; Zanellato 6'; Lima 1'; Soares 4'; Alves 6'; Con: Campos (3/4) 2', 4', 8'; Nicolau (2/3) 6', 4'	Report

Estadio Municipal de La Pintana
Referee: Kristine Lovatt (Canada)

== Sailing ==
Brazil has qualified 11 boats for a total of 17 sailors. The team was officially named on June 5, 2023.

Men

Athlete	Event	Opening series																		Finals				
Athlete	Event	1	2	3	4	5	6	7	8	9	10	11	12	13	14	15	16	Points	Rank	QF	SF	M / F	Points	Rank
Mateus Isaac	IQFoil	1	~~5~~	3	2	3	~~5~~	4	3	3	2	2	4	~~11~~; ~~UFD~~	2	3	1	33	3 Q	Bye	1 Q	1	—N/a	1st place, gold medalist(s)
Bruno Fontes	Laser	5	1	4	6	6	2	~~9~~	6	4	4	—N/a						38	4 Q	—N/a		11; STP	49	5
Marco Grael; Gabriel Simões	49er	2	7	5	3	~~9~~; ~~OCS~~	4	1	2	1	6	4	6	—N/a				41	4 Q	—N/a		11; STP	52	5
Bruno Lobo	Kite	~~1~~	~~1~~	1	~~10~~; ~~DNF~~	1	1	1	1	1	1	1	1	1	1	1	1	13	1 Q	—N/a		1	—N/a	1st place, gold medalist(s)

Women

Athlete	Event	Opening series																		Finals				
Athlete	Event	1	2	3	4	5	6	7	8	9	10	11	12	13	14	15	16	Points	Rank	QF	SF	M / F	Points	Rank
Bruna Martinelli	IQFoil	~~5~~	4	4	5	4	3	4	4	4	4	2	~~7~~	4	5	~~6~~	5	52	4 q	3	Did not advance			6
Gabriella Kidd	Laser radial	6	6	7	7	7	4	8	3	7	~~10~~	—N/a						55	7	—N/a		Did not advance		
Martine Grael; Kahena Kunze	49erFX	3	1	1	~~6~~; ~~DSQ~~	1	1	1	2	3	3	1	3	—N/a				20	1 Q	—N/a		2 STP	22	1st place, gold medalist(s)
Socorro Reis	Kite	3	~~4~~	3	~~4~~	3	4	4	3	4	4	2	4	1	~~8~~; ~~UFD~~	3	3	41	4 Q	—N/a		3	—N/a	3rd place, bronze medalist(s)

Mixed

Athlete	Event	Race													Total	
Athlete	Event	1	2	3	4	5	6	7	8	9	10	11	12	M	Points	Rank
Juliana Duque; Rafael Martins	Snipe	4	3	3	4	6	3	3	1	3	1	—N/a		10	35	3rd place, bronze medalist(s)
Thomas Summer; Ana Barbachan; Larissa Juk	Lightning	7	6	7	6	6	6	6	4	5	5	—N/a		Did not advance	50	7
Samuel Albrecht; Gabriela Nicolino	Nacra 17	2	2	3	3	3	3	3	1	3	3	2	2	6	33	3rd place, bronze medalist(s)

== Shooting ==
Brazil qualified a total of 15 sports shooters in the 2022 Americas Shooting Championships. Brazil also qualified three shooters during the 2022 South American Games. The shotgun team was officially named on May 18, 2023.

Men

Pistol and rifle

Athlete	Event	Qualification		Final	
Athlete	Event	Points	Rank	Points	Rank
Felipe Wu	10 m air pistol	573	3 Q	215.3	3rd place, bronze medalist(s)
Philipe Chateaubrian	10 m air pistol	571	5 Q	192.6	4
Emerson Duarte	25 m rapid fire pistol	559	13	Did not advance	
Vladimir da Silveira	25 m rapid fire pistol	563	9	Did not advance	
Cassio Rippel	10 m air rifle	608.0	24	Did not advance	
Eduardo Sampaio	10 m air rifle	607.7	25	Did not advance	
Cassio Rippel	50 m rifle three positions	585	3 Q	392.9	7
Eduardo Sampaio	50 m rifle three positions	574	9	Did not advance	

Shotgun

Athlete	Event	Qualification		Final	
Athlete	Event	Points	Rank	Points	Rank
Hussein Daruich	Trap	113	10	Did not advance	
Jaison Santin	Trap	114	7	Did not advance	
Renato Araujo	Skeet	110	18	Did not advance	
Roberth de Oliveira	Skeet	114	12	Did not advance	

Women

Pistol and rifle

Athlete	Event	Qualification		Final	
Athlete	Event	Points	Rank	Points	Rank
Cibele Breide	10 m air pistol	554	14	Did not advance	
Ana Luiza Ferrão	25 m pistol	555	15	Did not advance	
Cibele Breide	25 m pistol	562	10	Did not advance	
Geovana Meyer	10 m air rifle	623.0	7 Q	161.9	6
Simone Prachthauser	10 m air rifle	607.0	22	Did not advance	
Geovana Meyer	50 m rifle three positions	581	6 Q	424.4	5
Simone Prachthauser	50 m rifle three positions	564	16	Did not advance	

Shotgun

Athlete	Event	Qualification		Final	
Athlete	Event	Points	Rank	Points	Rank
Camila Cosmosky	Trap	104	8	Did not advance	
Daiana Camaz	Trap	87	14	Did not advance	
Georgia Furquim	Skeet	118	4 Q	21	5

Mixed

Athlete	Event	Qualification		Final / BM	
Athlete	Event	Points	Rank	Opposition Result	Rank
Felipe Wu; Cibele Breide	10 m air pistol team	569	4 QB	Bronze medal final Mowrer / Emmert (USA); L 0–16	4
Renato Araujo; Georgia Furquim	Skeet team	126	12	Did not advance	

== Sport climbing ==
Brazil qualified a team of seven climbers (four men and three women) by virtue of their IFSC world rankings.

Boulder & lead

Athlete	Event	Qualification						Final					
Athlete	Event	Bouldering		Lead		Total		Bouldering		Lead		Total	
Athlete	Event	Result	Rank	Hold	Rank	Points	Rank	Result	Rank	Hold	Rank	Points	Rank
Felipe Ho	Men's	64.7	=10	45.1	=9	109.7	10	Did not advance					
Mateus Bellotto	Men's	54.1	15	36.1	=11	90.2	15	Did not advance					
Rodrigo Hanada	Men's	49.5	16	33.1	=15	82.6	16	Did not advance					
Anja Köhler	Women's	49.6	14	26.1	=8	75.7	14	Did not advance					
Bianca Castro	Women's	44.4	16	26.1	=8	70.5	15	Did not advance					
Mariana Hanggi Correia	Women's	49.6	15	12.1	19	61.5	16	Did not advance					

Speed

Athlete	Event	Qualification			Round of 16	Quarterfinal	Semifinal	Final / BM	
Athlete	Event	Lane A	Lane B	Rank	Opposition Result	Opposition Result	Opposition Result	Opposition Result	Rank
Pedro Egg	Men's	7.42	~~FALL~~	14	Brosler (USA); W 7.35–7.67	Bratschi (USA); L 7.04–5.47	Did not advance		8

== Surfing ==
Brazil qualified ten surfers (five men and five women). The team was named on September 4, 2023.

Artistic

Men

Athlete	Event	Round 1	Round 2	Round 3	Round 4	Repechage 1	Repechage 2	Repechage 3	Repechage 4	Repechage 5	Repechage 6	Final / BM	
Athlete	Event	Opposition Result	Opposition Result	Opposition Result	Opposition Result	Opposition Result	Opposition Result	Opposition Result	Opposition Result	Opposition Result	Opposition Result	Opposition Result	Rank
Krystian Kymerson	Shortboard	Correa (BRA); W 10.04–8.80	Tudela (PER); L 11.53–12.33	Did not advance		Bye	Correa (BRA); W 14.50–7.40	Usuna (ARG); W 13.86–9.00	Mesinas (PER); L 10.43–10.80	Did not advance			
Marcos Correa	Shortboard	Kymerson (BRA); L 8.80–10.04	Did not advance			López (VEN); W 16.16–4.50	Kymerson (BRA); L 7.40–14.50	Did not advance					
Luiz Diniz	Stand up paddleboard	Spencer (CAN); Salazar (CHI); W 15.50 Q	Torres (PUR); Martino (PER); W 14.34 Q	Rodríguez (MEX); W 9.76–3.14	Schweitzer (USA); L 11.30–13.13	—N/a	Bye				Spencer (CAN); W 15.17–9.66	Schweitzer (USA); L 10.23–16.00	2nd place, silver medalist(s)
Carlos Bahia	Longboard	Schweizer (URU); Cedeño (PAN); W 11.66 Q	Cortéz (CHI); Pérez (ARG); W 14.44 Q	Schweizer (URU); W 14.84–11.27	Clemente (PER); L 11.40–14.50	—N/a	Bye				Cortéz (CHI); L 3.10–14.26	Did not advance	3rd place, bronze medalist(s)

Women

Athlete	Event	Round 1	Round 2	Round 3	Round 4	Repechage 1	Repechage 2	Repechage 3	Repechage 4	Repechage 5	Repechage 6	Final / BM	
Athlete	Event	Opposition Result	Opposition Result	Opposition Result	Opposition Result	Opposition Result	Opposition Result	Opposition Result	Opposition Result	Opposition Result	Opposition Result	Opposition Result	Rank
Tatiana Weston-Webb	Shortboard	Anderson (CHI); W 12.50–9.20	Dempfle-Olin (CAN); W 15.43–5.17	Rosas (PER); W 12.04–10.50	McGonagle (CRC); W 14.10–8.33	Bye						Dempfle-Olin (CAN); W 12.33–10.13	1st place, gold medalist(s)
Silvana Lima	Shortboard	Pioli (MEX); W 9.23–3.00	McGonagle (CRC); L 7.07–10.03	Did not advance		Bye	Pioli (MEX); W 10.30–3.30	Aguirre (PER); L 4.50–14.67	Did not advance				
Aline Adisaka	Stand up paddleboard	Bowen (ECU); Alabi (ESA); W 10.13 Q	Torres (PER); Lagos (CHI); L 8.16 Q	Cosoleto (ARG); W 8.43–8.17	Gómez (COL); W 6.30–2.73	—N/a	Bye					Gómez (COL); L 7.04–7.93	2nd place, silver medalist(s)
Chloé Calmon	Longboard	Portillo (ESA); Wilson (CHI); W 7.00 Q	Pellizzari (ARG); Stokes (CAN); W 13.83 Q	Portillo (ESA); W 11.34–0	Reyes (PER); L 13.37–14.33	—N/a	Bye				Reyes Días (CRC); W 7.50–1.17	Reyes (PER); L 6.64–7.50	2nd place, silver medalist(s)

Race

Athlete	Event	Time	Rank
David Leão	Men's stand up paddleboard	15:19.2	4
Lena Ribeiro	Women's stand up paddleboard	18:43.5	6

== Swimming ==
Brazil qualified two female swimmers to the Open Water event during the 2022 South American Games. Brazil also qualified 10 swimmers by winning events at the 2021 Junior Pan American Games. On June 26, 2023 Brazilian Confederation of Aquatic Sports announced the pool team of 42 swimmers (22 men and 20 women), including 10 athletes qualified through the 2021 Junior Pan American Games.

Men

Athlete	Event	Heat		Final	
Athlete	Event	Time	Rank	Time	Rank
Guilherme Caribé	50 m freestyle	22.47	6 Q	22.27	=5
Marcelo Chierighini	50 m freestyle	22.57	8 q	Did not start	
Victor Alcará	50 m freestyle	22.46	5 Q	22.39	=7
Breno Correia	100 m freestyle	49.05	6 q	50.19	13
Guilherme Caribé	100 m freestyle	48.63	2 Q	48.06	1st place, gold medalist(s)
Marcelo Chierighini	100 m freestyle	48.64	3 Q	48.92	5
Breno Correia	200 m freestyle	1:47.59	1 Q	1:48.22	5
Fernando Scheffer	200 m freestyle	1:48.03	3 q	1:51.21	10
Murilo Sartori	200 m freestyle	1:47.63	2 Q	1:47.95	3rd place, bronze medalist(s)
Guilherme Costa	400 m freestyle	3:52.23	1 Q	3:46.79	1st place, gold medalist(s)
Stephan Steverink	400 m freestyle	3:55.00	3 Q	3:53.77	5
Guilherme Costa	800 m freestyle	—N/a		7:53.01	1st place, gold medalist(s)
Tiago Ruffini	800 m freestyle	—N/a		8:00.01	4
Guilherme Costa	1500 m freestyle	—N/a		15:09.29	1st place, gold medalist(s)
Pedro Guastelli Farias	1500 m freestyle	—N/a		15:25.26	4
Stephan Steverink	1500 m freestyle	—N/a		15:56.02	8
Gabriel Fantoni	100 m backstroke	55.21	6 Q	54.82	6
Guilherme Basseto	100 m backstroke	54.75	3 Q	54.40	4
Brandonn Almeida	200 m backstroke	2:02.45	8 Q	2:01.56	6
Leonardo de Deus	200 m backstroke	2:01.79	6 Q	2:01.66	7
João Gomes Júnior	100 m breaststroke	1:00.89	2 Q	1:01.17	5
Raphael Windmuller	100 m breaststroke	1:01.43	5 Q	1:01.62	7
Raphael Windmuller	200 m breaststroke	2:16.13	7 Q	2:15.85	8
Vinicius Lanza	100 m butterfly	52.78	2 Q	52.52	2nd place, silver medalist(s)
Vitor Baganha	100 m butterfly	53.11	4 Q	53.00	6
Leonardo de Deus	200 m butterfly	1:59.09	3 Q	1:57.25	2nd place, silver medalist(s)
Luiz Altamir Melo	200 m butterfly	2:00.51	6 Q	2:01.27	8
Matheus Gonche	200 m butterfly	2:01.77	11 q	2:01.28	10
Leonardo Coelho	200 m individual medley	2:02.63	5 Q	2:00.58	3rd place, bronze medalist(s)
Vinicius Lanza	200 m individual medley	2:02.44	3 Q	2:01.63	6
Brandonn Almeida	400 m individual medley	4:22.46	4 Q	4:18.74	3rd place, bronze medalist(s)
Stephan Steverink	400 m individual medley	4:24.98	7 Q	4:22.29	6
Guilherme Caribé; Marcelo Chierighini; Victor Alcará; Felipe Ribeiro; Breno Correia	4 × 100 m freestyle relay	3:16.15	1 Q	3:13.51	1st place, gold medalist(s)
Murilo Sartori; Breno Correia; Fernando Scheffer; Guilherme Costa; Luiz Altamir Melo; Leonardo Coelho; Felipe Ribeiro	4 × 200 m freestyle relay	7:22.38	1 Q	7:07.53	1st place, gold medalist(s)
Guilherme Basseto; João Gomes Júnior; Vinicius Lanza; Guilherme Caribé; Gabriel Fantoni; Raphael Windmuller; Vitor Baganha; Victor Alcará	4 × 100 m medley relay	3:37.45	2 Q	3:35.12	2nd place, silver medalist(s)

Women

Athlete	Event	Heat		Final	
Athlete	Event	Time	Rank	Time	Rank
Lorrane Ferreira	50 m freestyle	25.30	4 Q	25.17	4
Stephanie Balduccini	50 m freestyle	25.50	5 Q	25.25	5
Ana Carolina Vieira	100 m freestyle	54.89	2 Q	55.07	6
Celine Bispo	100 m freestyle	57.15	12 q	57.82	16
Stephanie Balduccini	100 m freestyle	54.96	3 Q	54.13	2nd place, silver medalist(s)
Ana Carolina Vieira	200 m freestyle	2:03.18	11 q	Did not start	
Maria Fernanda Costa	200 m freestyle	2:01.23	3 Q	1:58.12	2nd place, silver medalist(s)
Stephanie Balduccini	200 m freestyle	2:01.25	4 Q	1:58.67	4
Gabrielle Roncatto	400 m freestyle	4:14.37	2 Q	4:06.88	3rd place, bronze medalist(s)
Maria Fernanda Costa	400 m freestyle	4:13.85	1 Q	4:06.68	2nd place, silver medalist(s)
Maria Paula Heitmann	400 m freestyle	4:16.61	8 q	4:16.81	9
Gabrielle Roncatto	800 m freestyle	—N/a		8:47.83	7
Viviane Jungblut	800 m freestyle	—N/a		8:33.55	3rd place, bronze medalist(s)
Beatriz Dizotti	1500 m freestyle	—N/a		16:24.65	4
Viviane Jungblut	1500 m freestyle	—N/a		16:19.89	3rd place, bronze medalist(s)
Julia Karla Góes	100 m backstroke	1:03.02	10 q	1:03.47	14
Maria Luiza Pessanha	100 m backstroke	1:03.25	14 q	1:02.42	9
Alexia Assunção	200 m backstroke	2:13.61	2 Q	2:13.31	3rd place, bronze medalist(s)
Fernanda de Goeij	200 m backstroke	2:17.49	7 Q	2:20.05	8
Jhennifer Conceição	100 m breaststroke	1:09.75	7 Q	1:10.10	7
Nichelly Lysy	100 m breaststroke	1:10.81	11 q	1:10.55	10
Bruna Leme	200 m breaststroke	2:35.41	10 q	2:32.59	10
Gabrielle Assis	200 m breaststroke	2:26.00	2 Q	2:25.52	3rd place, bronze medalist(s)
Celine Bispo	100 m butterfly	1:00.47	9 q	1:00.88	12
Clarissa Rodrigues	100 m butterfly	1:00.02	7 Q	1:00.50	7
Giovanna Diamante	100 m butterfly	1:00.19	8 Q	1:00.21	6
Giovanna Diamante	200 m butterfly	2:16.60	10 q	Did not start	
Maria Fernanda Costa	200 m butterfly	2:18.84	12 q	Did not start	
Gabrielle Roncatto	200 m individual medley	2:18.28	8 Q	2:18.07	7
Bruna Leme	200 m individual medley	2:18.63	9 q	2:17.55	9
Gabrielle Roncatto	400 m individual medley	4:51.43	4 Q	4:47.92	3rd place, bronze medalist(s)
Nathalia Almeida	400 m individual medley	4:51.33	3 Q	4:52.15	5
Ana Carolina Vieira; Stephanie Balduccini; Giovanna Diamante; Celine Bispo; Lorrane Ferreira	4 × 100 m freestyle relay	3:42.74	1 Q	3:39.94	3rd place, bronze medalist(s)
Maria Fernanda Costa; Nathalia Almeida; Stephanie Balduccini; Gabrielle Roncatto; Maria Paula Heitmann; Giovanna Diamante; Celine Bispo; Maria Luiza Pessanha	4 × 200 m freestyle relay	8:20.05	4 Q	7:55.85	2nd place, silver medalist(s)
Maria Luiza Pessanha; Jhennifer Conceição; Clarissa Rodrigues; Stephanie Balduccini; Julia Karla Góes; Nichelly Lysy; Giovanna Diamante; Ana Carolina Vieira	4 × 100 m medley relay	4:11.38	4 Q	4:04.95	5
Ana Marcela Cunha	10 km open water	—N/a		1:57:29.4	2nd place, silver medalist(s)
Viviane Jungblut	10 km open water	—N/a		1:57:51.1	3rd place, bronze medalist(s)

Mixed

Athlete	Event	Heat		Final	
Athlete	Event	Time	Rank	Time	Rank
Guilherme Caribé; Marcelo Chierighini; Ana Carolina Vieira; Stephanie Balduccini; Felipe Ribeiro; Victor Alcará; Lorrane Ferreira; Nathalia Almeida	4 × 100 m freestyle relay	3:32.02	3 Q	3:23.78	1st place, gold medalist(s)
Guilherme Basseto; João Gomes Júnior; Clarissa Rodrigues; Stephanie Balduccini; Gabriel Fantoni; Jhennifer Conceição; Victor Baganha; Giovanna Diamante	4 × 100 m medley relay	3:55.72	3 Q	3:49.24	3rd place, bronze medalist(s)

Qualification legend: Q – Qualify to the medal final; q – Qualify to the non-medal final

With slanted italic writing, swimmers who only participated in the heats, but who also win medals.

== Table tennis ==
Brazil qualified a full team of six athletes (three men and three women) through the 2022 ITTF Pan American Championships. The team was officially named on September 19, 2023.

Men

Athlete	Event	Group stage			Round of 32	Round of 16	Quarterfinal	Semifinal	Final / BM	
Athlete	Event	Opposition Result	Opposition Result	Rank	Opposition Result	Opposition Result	Opposition Result	Opposition Result	Opposition Result	Rank
Hugo Calderano	Singles	—N/a			Fernández (PER); W 4–0	Ly (CAN); W 4–1	Gómez (CHI); W 4–0	Madrid (MEX); W 4–1	Pereira (CUB); W 4–0	1st place, gold medalist(s)
Vitor Ishiy	Singles	—N/a			Duffoó (PER); W 4–2	Burgos (CHI); L 1–4	Did not advance			
Hugo Calderano; Vitor Ishiy	Doubles	—N/a				Castro / Madrid (MEX); W 4–0	Ly / Martin (CAN); W 4–2	Burgos / Gómez (CHI); W 4–2	Campos / Pereira (CUB); L 2–4	2nd place, silver medalist(s)
Eric Jouti; Hugo Calderano; Vitor Ishiy	Team	Paraguay; W 3–0	Ecuador; W 3–2	1 Q	—N/a		Puerto Rico; W 3–0	Argentina; W 3–2	Canada; W 3–1	1st place, gold medalist(s)

Women

Athlete	Event	Group stage			Round of 32	Round of 16	Quarterfinal	Semifinal	Final / BM	
Athlete	Event	Opposition Result	Opposition Result	Rank	Opposition Result	Opposition Result	Opposition Result	Opposition Result	Opposition Result	Rank
Bruna Takahashi	Singles	—N/a			Duffoó (PER); W 4–0	Arellano (ECU); W 4–0	González (VEN); W 4–2	Zhang (USA); W 4–0	Díaz (PUR); L 3–4	2nd place, silver medalist(s)
Giulia Takahashi	Singles	—N/a			Obando (VEN); W 4–0	Silva (MEX); L 2–4	Did not advance			
Bruna Takahashi; Giulia Takahashi	Doubles	—N/a				Brito / Castro (DOM); W 4–0	Crespo / Fonseca (CUB); W 4–2	Díaz / Díaz (PUR); W 4–1	Wang / Sung (USA); L 3–4	2nd place, silver medalist(s)
Bruna Takahashi; Giulia Takahashi; Bruna Alexandre	Team	Chile; W 3–0	Colombia; W 3–1	1 Q	—N/a		Canada; W 3–1	United States; L 0–3	Did not advance	3rd place, bronze medalist(s)

Mixed

Athlete	Event	Round of 32	Round of 16	Quarterfinal	Semifinal	Final / BM	
Athlete	Event	Opposition Result	Opposition Result	Opposition Result	Opposition Result	Opposition Result	Rank
Vitor Ishiy; Bruna Takahashi	Doubles	Bye	Castillo / González (VEN); W 4–0	Liang / Zhang (USA); W 4–1	Wang / Zhang (CAN); W 4–2	Campos / Fonseca (CUB); L 0–4	2nd place, silver medalist(s)

== Taekwondo ==
Brazil has qualified a female taekwondo practitioner at a Kyorugi event, by virtue of her title in the 2021 Junior Pan American Games. Brazil also qualified seven taekwondo practitioners (four men and three women) during the Pan American Games Qualification Tournament. The team was officially named on September 14, 2023.

Kyorugi

Men

Athlete	Event	Round of 16	Quarterfinals	Semifinals	Repechage	Final / BM	
Athlete	Event	Opposition Result	Opposition Result	Opposition Result	Opposition Result	Opposition Result	Rank
Paulo Ricardo Melo	–58 kg	Bye	Reyes (DOM); W 2–0	Gusmán (ARG); L 0–2	Bye	Bronze medal final Miranda (ECU); W 2–0	3rd place, bronze medalist(s)
Edival Pontes	–68 kg	Bye	Paz (COL); L 1–2	Did not advance			
Lucas Ostapiv	–80 kg	Sealy (JAM); W 2–1	Nickolas (USA); L 0–2	Did not advance	Bye	Bronze medal final Robleto (NCA); W 2–0	3rd place, bronze medalist(s)
Maicon Siqueira	+80 kg	Bye	Alves (ARG); L 1–2	Did not advance			
Paulo Ricardo Melo; Edival Pontes; Maicon Siqueira	Team	Argentina; W 101–95	Cuba; W 76–70	Ecuador; W 67–37	—N/a	Chile; W 48–16	1st place, gold medalist(s)

Women

Athlete	Event	Round of 16	Quarterfinals	Semifinals	Repechage	Final / BM	
Athlete	Event	Opposition Result	Opposition Result	Opposition Result	Opposition Result	Opposition Result	Rank
Sandy Macedo	–57 kg	Did not start					
Maria Clara Pacheco	–57 kg	Bye	Sulbarán (VEN); W 2–0	Villegas (MEX); W 2–0	Bye	Park (CAN); L 1–2	2nd place, silver medalist(s)
Caroline Santos	–67 kg	Bye	Mina (ECU); W 2–0	Lee (HAI); L 1–2	Bye	Bronze medal final Teachout (USA); L WDR	=4
Gabriele Siqueira	+67 kg	Bye	Shipman (HAI); L 0–2	Did not advance			
Sandy Macedo; Caroline Santos; Gabriele Siqueira	Team	Ecuador; W 64–37	Chile; W 57–16	Mexico; L 60–61	—N/a	Did not advance	3rd place, bronze medalist(s)

== Tennis ==
Brazil qualified a full team of six athletes (three men and three women). The team was officially named on September 19, 2023.

Men

Athlete	Event	Round of 64	Round of 32	Round of 16	Quarterfinal	Semifinal	Final / BM	
Athlete	Event	Opposition Result	Opposition Result	Opposition Result	Opposition Result	Opposition Result	Opposition Result	Rank
Thiago Monteiro	Singles	Bye	Huertas del Pino (PER); W 6–0, 6–4	Lama (CHI); W 6–3, 6–4	Bagnis (ARG); W 6–2, 6–4	Barrios (CHI); L 3–6, 1–6	Bronze medal match Heide (BRA); W 1–6, 6–3, 7–6^{(7–5)}	3rd place, bronze medalist(s)
Gustavo Heide	Singles	Bye	Cid (DOM); W 7–5, 6–4	Boulais (CAN); W 6–3, 6–3	Vallejo (PAR); W 6–3, 6–4	Acosta (ARG); L 6–4, 4–6, 6–7^{(6–8)}	Bronze medal match Monteiro (BRA); L 6–1, 3–6, 6–7^{(5–7)}	4
Marcelo Demoliner; Gustavo Heide	Doubles	—N/a	Bye		Bicknell / Phillips (JAM); W 6–2, 6–3	Hardt / Cid (DOM); W 7–6^{(7–4)}, 6–3	Barrios / Tabilo (CHI); W 6–1, 2–6, [10–7]	1st place, gold medalist(s)

Women

Athlete	Event	Round of 64	Round of 32	Round of 16	Quarterfinal	Semifinal	Final / BM	
Athlete	Event	Opposition Result	Opposition Result	Opposition Result	Opposition Result	Opposition Result	Opposition Result	Rank
Laura Pigossi	Singles	Bye	Cruz (ESA); W 6–0, 6–0	Pérez Alarcón (PER); W 2–6, 7–5, 6–4	Loeb (USA); W 7–5, 4–6, 6–1	Riera (ARG); W 4–6, 6–4, 7–6^{(7–5)}	Carlé (ARG); W 6–2, 6–3	1st place, gold medalist(s)
Carolina Meligeni	Singles	Bye	Aguilar (ESA); W 6–0, 6–0	Zeballos (BOL); W 6–4, 6–2	Carle (ARG); L 6–7^{(5–7)}, 1–6	Did not advance		
Luisa Stefani; Laura Pigossi	Doubles	—N/a	Bye		Reasco / Romero (ECU); W 6–2, 6–3	Guarachi / Labraña (CHI); W 6–2, 6–3	González / Pérez (COL); W 7–5, 6–3	1st place, gold medalist(s)

Mixed

Athlete	Event	Round of 16	Quarterfinal	Semifinal	Final / BM	
Athlete	Event	Opposition Result	Opposition Result	Opposition Result	Opposition Result	Rank
Marcelo Demoliner; Luisa Stefani	Doubles	Bye	Boulais / Marino (CAN); W 6–4, 3–6, [10–7]	Acosta / Capurro (ARG); W 6–2, 6–4	Barrientos / Lizarazo (COL); L 3–6, 4–6	2nd place, silver medalist(s)

== Triathlon ==
Brazilian triathlete Miguel Hidalgo achieved an individual spot after winning the individual competition in the 2021 Junior Pan American Games. Brazil qualified a team of four triathletes (two men and two women) after winning the mixed relay competition in the 2022 South American Games.

Individual

Athlete	Event	Swim (1.5 km)	Trans 1	Bike (40 km)	Trans 2	Run (10 km)	Total	Rank
Antônio Bravo Neto	Men's	18:19	0:57	55:32	0:26	32:15	1:47:31	11
Kauê Willy	Men's	18:24	0:51	55:31	0:26	32:51	1:48:06	13
Manoel Messias	Men's	19:44	0:51	56:22	0:27	29:49	1:47:15	9
Miguel Hidalgo	Men's	18:21	1:02	55:23	0:24	30:57	1:46:08	1st place, gold medalist(s)
Djenyfer Arnold	Women's	18:49	1:02	1:02:29	0:30	36:39	1:59:32	9
Luisa Baptista	Women's	19:07	0:54	1:02:18	0:30	38:42	2:01:33	18
Vittória Lopes	Women's	18:15	0:51	1:02:39	0:30	36:47	1:59:03	8

Relay

Athlete	Event	Swimming (300 m)	Transition 1	Biking (6.6 km)	Transition 2	Running (1.5 km)	Total	Rank
Miguel Hidalgo	Mixed	3:31	0:47	8:33	0:21	4:31	17:43	—N/a
Djenyfer Arnold	Mixed	3:50	0:49	9:27	0:25	5:13	19:44	—N/a
Manoel Messias	Mixed	3:43	0:40	8:34	0:21	4:13	17:31	—N/a
Vittória Lopes	Mixed	3:42	0:47	9:32	0:27	5:35	20:03	—N/a
Total	Mixed	—N/a					1:15:08	1st place, gold medalist(s)

== Volleyball ==
=== Beach ===
Brazil qualified a men's and women's pair for a total of four athletes by winning the 2021 Junior Pan American Games. The team was officially named on September 2, 2023.

Athlete	Event	Group stage				Round of 16	Quarterfinal	Semifinal	Final / BM	
Athlete	Event	Opposition Result	Opposition Result	Opposition Result	Rank	Opposition Result	Opposition Result	Opposition Result	Opposition Result	Rank
André Stein; George Wanderley	Men's tournament	Flores / Armando (ESA); W 2–0 (21–7, 21–13)	Murray / Noriega (COL); W 2–0 (21–15, 21–10)	Díaz / Alayo (CUB); L 1–2 (16–21, 21–18, 8–15)	2 Q	Melgarejo / Massare (PAR); W 2–0 (21–14, 21–14)	Capogrosso / Capogrosso (ARG); W 2–1 (21–17, 15–21, 17–15)	Grimalt / Grimalt (CHI); W 2–0 (21–13, 21–17)	Díaz / Alayo (CUB); W 2–1 (21–12, 19–21, 15–13)	1st place, gold medalist(s)
Ana Patrícia Ramos; Eduarda Lisboa	Women's tournament	Molina / Soler (ESA); W 2–0 (21–9, 21–6)	Ríos / Guzmán (COL); W 2–0 (21–13, 21–10)	Navas / González (PUR); W 2–0 (21–15, 21–11)	1 Q	Bye	Gaona / Allcca (PER); W 2–0 (21–12, 21–9)	Quiggle / Murphy (USA); W 2–0 (21–11, 21–18)	Humana-Paredes / Wilkerson (CAN); W 2–0 (22–20, 21–18)	1st place, gold medalist(s)

=== Indoor ===
Summary

Team	Event	Group stage				Quarterfinal	Semifinal	Final / BM / Pl.	
Team	Event	Opposition Result	Opposition Result	Opposition Result	Rank	Opposition Result	Opposition Result	Opposition Result	Rank
Brazil men's	Men's tournament	Colombia; W 3–0	Mexico; W 3–0	Cuba; W 3–2	1 Q	Bye	Colombia; W 3–0	Argentina; W 3–0	1st place, gold medalist(s)
Brazil women's	Women's tournament	Cuba; W 3–0	Argentina; W 3–0	Puerto Rico; W 3–0	1 Q	Bye	Mexico; W 3–2	Dominican Republic; L 0–3	2nd place, silver medalist(s)

==== Men's tournament ====
Brazil qualified a men's team (of 12 athletes) by winning the 2021 Junior Pan American Games.

Group stage

Pos	Team	Pld	W	L	Pts	SPW	SPL	SPR	SW	SL	SR
1	Brazil	3	3	0	8	261	202	1.292	9	2	4.500
2	Cuba	3	2	1	6	292	285	1.025	8	5	1.600
3	Colombia	3	1	2	3	190	215	0.884	3	6	0.500
4	Mexico	3	0	3	1	219	260	0.842	2	9	0.222

Source: Santiago 2023

30 October 2023; 10:30	Brazil	3–0	Colombia	Arena Parque O'Higgins, Santiago; Attendance: 8,000
30 October 2023; 10:30	(25–20, 25–17, 25–10); P2 P3			Arena Parque O'Higgins, Santiago; Attendance: 8,000

31 October 2023; 13:30	Brazil	3–0	Mexico	Arena Parque O'Higgins, Santiago; Attendance: 8,814
31 October 2023; 13:30	(25–13, 25–15, 25–20); P2P3			Arena Parque O'Higgins, Santiago; Attendance: 8,814

1 November 2023; 10:30	Brazil	3–2	Cuba	Arena Parque O'Higgins, Santiago; Attendance: 10,000
1 November 2023; 10:30	(25–23, 25–16, 18–25, 25–27, 18–16); P2P3			Arena Parque O'Higgins, Santiago; Attendance: 10,000

Semifinal

3 November 2023; 20:30	Brazil	3–0	Colombia	Arena Parque O'Higgins, Santiago
3 November 2023; 20:30	(26–24, 25–18, 25–15)			Arena Parque O'Higgins, Santiago

Gold medal match

4 November 2023; 20:00	Argentina	0–3	Brazil	Arena Parque O'Higgins, Santiago
4 November 2023; 20:00	(23–25, 13–25, 22–25)			Arena Parque O'Higgins, Santiago

==== Women's tournament ====
Brazil qualified a women's team (of 12 athletes) by winning the 2021 Junior Pan American Games.

Group stage

Pos	Team	Pld	W	L	Pts	SPW	SPL	SPR	SW	SL	SR
1	Brazil	3	3	0	9	225	153	1.471	9	0	MAX
2	Argentina	3	2	1	6	218	208	1.048	6	4	1.500
3	Puerto Rico	3	1	2	3	212	221	0.959	4	6	0.667
4	Cuba	3	0	3	0	152	225	0.676	0	9	0.000

Source: Santiago 2023

21 October 2023; 10:30	Brazil	3–0	Cuba	Arena Parque O'Higgins, Santiago; Attendance: 8,000
21 October 2023; 10:30	(25–14, 25–16, 25–14); P2 P3			Arena Parque O'Higgins, Santiago; Attendance: 8,000

22 October 2023; 13:30	Brazil	3–0	Argentina	Arena Parque O'Higgins, Santiago; Attendance: 9,000
22 October 2023; 13:30	(25–13, 25–20, 25–18); P2 P3			Arena Parque O'Higgins, Santiago; Attendance: 9,000

23 October 2023; 10:30	Brazil	3–0	Puerto Rico	Arena Parque O'Higgins, Santiago; Attendance: 5,260
23 October 2023; 10:30	(25–15, 25–22, 25–21); P2 P3			Arena Parque O'Higgins, Santiago; Attendance: 5,260

Semifinal

25 October 2023; 20:30	Brazil	3–2	Mexico	Arena Parque O'Higgins, Santiago; Attendance: 5,500
25 October 2023; 20:30	(25–17, 22–25, 27–25, 22–25, 15–13); P2 P3			Arena Parque O'Higgins, Santiago; Attendance: 5,500

Gold medal match

26 October 2023; 20:00	Dominican Republic	3–0	Brazil	Arena Parque O'Higgins, Santiago; Attendance: 15,000
26 October 2023; 20:00	(26–24, 25–16, 25–19); P2 P3			Arena Parque O'Higgins, Santiago; Attendance: 15,000

== Water polo ==
Summary

Team	Event	Group stage				Quarterfinal	Semifinal	Final / BM / Pl.	
Team	Event	Opposition Result	Opposition Result	Opposition Result	Rank	Opposition Result	Opposition Result	Opposition Result	Rank
Brazil men's	Men's tournament	Puerto Rico; W 18–5	Mexico; W 21–10	United States; L 7–24	2 Q	Cuba; W 12–10	Canada; W 13–12	United States; L 7–17	2nd place, silver medalist(s)
Brazil women's	Women's tournament	Puerto Rico; W 19–7	Chile; W 31–2	United States; L 3–25	2 Q	Cuba; W 16–6	Canada; L 4–21	Bronze medal match Argentina; W 10–9	3rd place, bronze medalist(s)

=== Men's tournament ===
Brazil qualified a men's team (of 12 athletes) by winning the 2022 South American Games.

Preliminary round

Pos	Team	Pld	W	PSW	PSL	L	GF	GA	GD	Pts	Qualification
1	United States	3	3	0	0	0	82	18	+64	9	Quarterfinals
2	Brazil	3	2	0	0	1	46	39	+7	6	Quarterfinals
3	Puerto Rico	3	1	0	0	2	29	58	−29	3	Quarterfinals
4	Mexico	3	0	0	0	3	24	66	−42	0	Quarterfinals

Source: Santiago 2023
Rules for classification: 1) points; 2) head-to-head points; 3) head-to-head goal difference; 4) head-to-head number of goals scored; 5) goal difference.

30 October 2023; 15:00	Report	Brazil	18–5	Puerto Rico	Aquatic Center, Santiago; Referees: Hinds (NED)
30 October 2023; 15:00	Report	Score by quarters: 5–2, 3–2, 5–1, 5–0			Aquatic Center, Santiago; Referees: Hinds (NED)
30 October 2023; 15:00	Report	Coutinho, P. Real 4	Goals	Loubriel 2	Aquatic Center, Santiago; Referees: Hinds (NED)

31 October 2023; 18:00	Report	Brazil	21–10	Mexico	Aquatic Center, Santiago; Referees: Garcia Soto (VEN); Rincón Patiño (COL)
31 October 2023; 18:00	Report	Score by quarters: 5–2, 5–3, 6–3, 5–2			Aquatic Center, Santiago; Referees: Garcia Soto (VEN); Rincón Patiño (COL)
31 October 2023; 18:00	Report	Guimarães, P. Real 5	Goals	Estrada 4	Aquatic Center, Santiago; Referees: Garcia Soto (VEN); Rincón Patiño (COL)

1 November 2023; 15:00	Report	Brazil	7–24	United States	Aquatic Center, Santiago; Referees: Mikhail Dykman (CAN); Frank Ohme (GER)
1 November 2023; 15:00	Report	Score by quarters: 2–5, 0–8, 2–5, 3–6			Aquatic Center, Santiago; Referees: Mikhail Dykman (CAN); Frank Ohme (GER)
1 November 2023; 15:00	Report	P. Real, R. Real 2	Goals	Daube 5	Aquatic Center, Santiago; Referees: Mikhail Dykman (CAN); Frank Ohme (GER)

Quarterfinal

2 November 2023; 15:00	Report	Brazil	16–6	Cuba	Aquatic Center, Santiago; Referees: David Gomez Pordomingo (ESP); Darren Brown Spritosanto (USA)
2 November 2023; 15:00	Report	Score by quarters: 3–1, 5–1, 4–3, 4–1			Aquatic Center, Santiago; Referees: David Gomez Pordomingo (ESP); Darren Brown Spritosanto (USA)
2 November 2023; 15:00	Report	P. Real 4	Goals	De Armas 3	Aquatic Center, Santiago; Referees: David Gomez Pordomingo (ESP); Darren Brown Spritosanto (USA)

Semifinal

3 November 2023; 18:00	Report	Brazil	13–12	Canada	Aquatic Center, Santiago; Referees: Harvey Hinds (CUW); David Gomez Pordomingo (ESP)
3 November 2023; 18:00	Report	Score by quarters: 3–3, 2–3, 3–3, 5–3			Aquatic Center, Santiago; Referees: Harvey Hinds (CUW); David Gomez Pordomingo (ESP)
3 November 2023; 18:00	Report	Guimarães, P. Real 3	Goals	Constantin-Bicari, Patterson 3	Aquatic Center, Santiago; Referees: Harvey Hinds (CUW); David Gomez Pordomingo (ESP)

Gold medal game

4 November 2023; 20:30	Report	Brazil	7–17	United States	Aquatic Center, Santiago; Referees: Mikhail Dykman (CAN); Frank Ohme (GER)
4 November 2023; 20:30	Report	Score by quarters: 1–2, 2–6, 2–5, 2–4			Aquatic Center, Santiago; Referees: Mikhail Dykman (CAN); Frank Ohme (GER)
4 November 2023; 20:30	Report	three players 2	Goals	Bowen, Daube 5	Aquatic Center, Santiago; Referees: Mikhail Dykman (CAN); Frank Ohme (GER)

=== Women's tournament ===
Brazil qualified a women's team (of 12 athletes) by winning the 2022 South American Games.

Preliminary round

Pos	Team	Pld	W	PSW	PSL	L	GF	GA	GD	Pts	Qualification
1	United States	3	3	0	0	0	89	3	+86	9	Quarterfinals
2	Brazil	3	2	0	0	1	53	34	+19	6	Quarterfinals
3	Puerto Rico	3	1	0	0	2	21	60	−39	3	Quarterfinals
4	Chile (H)	3	0	0	0	3	14	80	−66	0	Quarterfinals

Source: Santiago 2023
Rules for classification: 1) points; 2) head-to-head points; 3) head-to-head goal difference; 4) head-to-head number of goals scored; 5) goal difference.
(H) Host

30 October 2023; 9:30	Report	Brazil	19–7	Puerto Rico	Aquatic Center, Santiago; Referees: German Moller (ARG); Wilhem Keman (NED)
30 October 2023; 9:30	Report	Score by quarters: 4–3, 6–2, 6–1, 3–1			Aquatic Center, Santiago; Referees: German Moller (ARG); Wilhem Keman (NED)
30 October 2023; 9:30	Report	Leão 4	Goals	Montalvo, Melendez 2	Aquatic Center, Santiago; Referees: German Moller (ARG); Wilhem Keman (NED)

31 October 2023; 12:30	Report	Brazil	31–2	Chile	Aquatic Center, Santiago; Referees: Mikhail Dykman (CAN); Agustin Pinski (ARG)
31 October 2023; 12:30	Report	Score by quarters: 10–0, 10–0, 3–2, 8–0			Aquatic Center, Santiago; Referees: Mikhail Dykman (CAN); Agustin Pinski (ARG)
31 October 2023; 12:30	Report	Leão 6	Goals	Puelma, Ravizza 1	Aquatic Center, Santiago; Referees: Mikhail Dykman (CAN); Agustin Pinski (ARG)

1 November 2023; 9:30	Report	Brazil	3–25	United States	Aquatic Center, Santiago; Referees: Gerardo Arellano Jr (MEX); Hélène Painchaud (CAN)
1 November 2023; 9:30	Report	Score by quarters: 1–4, 0–9, 0–4, 2–8			Aquatic Center, Santiago; Referees: Gerardo Arellano Jr (MEX); Hélène Painchaud (CAN)
1 November 2023; 9:30	Report	Belorio 2	Goals	Fattal 5	Aquatic Center, Santiago; Referees: Gerardo Arellano Jr (MEX); Hélène Painchaud (CAN)

Quarterfinal

2 November 2023; 9:30	Report	Cuba	10–12	Brazil	Aquatic Center, Santiago; Referees: Harvey Hinds (CUW); Danielle Dabbaghian (USA)
2 November 2023; 9:30	Report	Score by quarters: 3–1, 3–5, 2–4, 2–2			Aquatic Center, Santiago; Referees: Harvey Hinds (CUW); Danielle Dabbaghian (USA)
2 November 2023; 9:30	Report	Zunzunegui 5	Goals	Belorio 4	Aquatic Center, Santiago; Referees: Harvey Hinds (CUW); Danielle Dabbaghian (USA)

Semifinal

3 November 2023; 12:30	Report	Brazil	4–21	Canada	Aquatic Center, Santiago; Referees: Jose Garcia Soto (VEN); Reynel Castillo Torres (PUR)
3 November 2023; 12:30	Report	Score by quarters: 3–7, 0–5, 1–3, 0–6			Aquatic Center, Santiago; Referees: Jose Garcia Soto (VEN); Reynel Castillo Torres (PUR)
3 November 2023; 12:30	Report	Belorio 2	Goals	Lemay-Lavoie 6	Aquatic Center, Santiago; Referees: Jose Garcia Soto (VEN); Reynel Castillo Torres (PUR)

Bronze medal game

4 November 2023; 11:00	Report	Argentina	9–10	Brazil	Aquatic Center, Santiago; Referees: Ernesto Hernández Toledo (CUB); Gerardo Arellano Jr
4 November 2023; 11:00	Report	Score by quarters: 3–2, 3–3, 1–1, 2–4			Aquatic Center, Santiago; Referees: Ernesto Hernández Toledo (CUB); Gerardo Arellano Jr
4 November 2023; 11:00	Report	Canda 3	Goals	Ferreira 3	Aquatic Center, Santiago; Referees: Ernesto Hernández Toledo (CUB); Gerardo Arellano Jr

== Water skiing ==
Brazil qualified two wakeboarders (one men and one woman) during the 2022 Pan American Championship. Brazil also qualified two men water skiers during the 2022 Pan American Championship.

Water skiing

Men

Athlete	Event	Preliminary		Final				
Athlete	Event	Score	Rank	Slalom	Jump	Tricks	Total	Rank
Anthony Furmanovich	Slalom	2.50/58/12.00	16	Did not advance				
Felipe Simioni	Slalom	3.00/58/10.75	3 Q	4.00/58/10.75	—N/a			3rd place, bronze medalist(s)

Wakeboard

Athlete	Event	Preliminary		Last Chance Qualifier		Final	
Athlete	Event	Score	Rank	Score	Rank	Score	Rank
Henrique Daibert	Men's	58.33	3	76.67	2 Q	51.67	6
Mariana Nep	Women's	63.33	2 Q	Bye		35.78	6

== Weightlifting ==
Brazil qualified six weightlifters (three men and three women).

Men

Athlete	Event	Snatch		Clean & Jerk		Total	Rank
Athlete	Event	Result	Rank	Result	Rank	Total	Rank
Thiago Félix	–61 kg	115	8	147	6	262	7
Marco Gregório	–102 kg	163	6	190	8	353	7
Mateus Gregório	+102 kg	~~DSQ~~		~~DNS~~		—N/a	

Women

Athlete	Event	Snatch		Clean & Jerk		Total	Rank
Athlete	Event	Result	Rank	Result	Rank	Total	Rank
Eduarda Souza	–59 kg	90	8	115	7	205	8
Amanda Schott	–71 kg	~~DSQ~~		~~DNS~~		—N/a	
Laura Amaro	–81 kg	110	3	132	5	242	3rd place, bronze medalist(s)

== Wrestling ==
Brazil qualified 10 wrestlers (seven men and three women) through the 2022 Pan American Wrestling Championships and the 2023 Pan American Wrestling Championships. The team of ten athletes was officially named on June 11, 2023.

Key:

- VT – Victory by fall.
- PP – Decision by points – the loser with technical points.
- PO – Decision by points – the loser without technical points.
- SP – Technical superiority – the loser with technical points and a margin of victory of at least 9 (Greco-Roman) or 10 (freestyle) points.
- ST – Great superiority – the loser without technical points and a margin of victory of at least 8 (Greco-Roman) or 10 (freestyle) points.
- VA – Decision by withdrawal

Men

Athlete	Event	Round of 16	Quarterfinal	Semifinal	Repechage	Final / BM	
Athlete	Event	Opposition Result	Opposition Result	Opposition Result	Opposition Result	Opposition Result	Rank
César Alvan	Freestyle 74 kg	Bye	Valencia (MEX); L 4–14^{VT}	Did not advance			
Guilherme Barros	Freestyle 86 kg	Bye	Ramos (PUR); L 3–10^{VT}	Did not advance			
Calebe Ferreira	Greco-Roman 67 kg	Almanza (CHI); L 3–5^{PP}	Did not advance				
Joílson Júnior	Greco-Roman 77 kg	Bye	Benitez (MEX); W 8–0^{ST}	Rivas (VEN); W 5–1^{PP}	Bye	Bey (USA); L 5–12^{VT}	2nd place, silver medalist(s)
Ronisson Santiago	Greco-Roman 87 kg	Braunagel (USA); L 0–9^{ST}	Did not advance				
Igor Queiroz	Greco-Roman 97 kg	Bye	Pérez (VEN); L 5–8^{SP}	Did not advance	Bye	Bronze medal final Gomez (ARG); W 7–0^{PO}	3rd place, bronze medalist(s)
Eduard Soghomonyan	Greco-Roman 130 kg	Bye	Avila (HON); W 9–0^{ST}	Pino (CUB); L 0–11^{VT}	Bye	Bronze medal final Acosta (CHI); L 0–9^{ST}	=5

Women

Athlete	Event	Group round				Round of 16	Quarterfinal	Semifinal	Repechage	Final / BM	
Athlete	Event	Opposition Result	Opposition Result	Opposition Result	Rank	Opposition Result	Opposition Result	Opposition Result	Opposition Result	Opposition Result	Rank
Thalia Freitas	Freestyle 50 kg	Guzmán (CUB); L 0–10^{ST}	Rojas (VEN); L 1–6^{PP}	Morán (PAN); W 9–6^{PP}	3	Did not advance					
Giullia Penalber	Freestyle 57 kg	—N/a					Mota-Pettis (USA); W 5–4^{VT}	Alvares (CUB); W 2–0^{VT}	Bye	Taylor (CAN); W 7–6^{PP}	1st place, gold medalist(s)
Laís Nunes	Freestyle 62 kg	—N/a					Griman (VEN); W 5–1^{PP}	Miracle (USA); W 6–2^{PP}	Bye	Santana (CUB); W 3–0^{VT}	1st place, gold medalist(s)

== Demonstration sports ==
=== Esports ===
Brazil qualified two athletes (one man and one woman) in the eFootball 2023 tournament events.

The disputes were not counted in the official medal table, as the Esports appeared as a demonstration sport in these games, and thus athletes competing on it were not registered and didn't receive any medal related to the Pan American Games.

Men

- Claudio Henrique Mesquita – Silver

Women

- Monik Bisoni – Gold

== See also ==
- Brazil at the 2023 Parapan American Games
- Brazil at the 2024 Summer Olympics
