= Mexico at the 2021 Junior Pan American Games =

- IOC code: MEX
- NOC: Mexican Olympic Committee

in Cali–Valle del Cauca, Colombia November 25 – December 5, 2021
- Competitors: 356 (170 men and 186 women) in 38 sports and 290 events
- Flag bearers: Andrea Ibarra & Randal Willars (opening)
- Medals Ranked 4th: Gold 46 Silver 78 Bronze 48 Total 172

Junior Pan American Games appearances (overview)
- 2021; 2025

Mexico competed in the 2021 Junior Pan American Games in Cali–Valle, Colombia from November 25 to December 5, 2021.

== Medalist ==
Medal	Name	Sport	Event	Date
Gold medal	Isabel Aburto	Canoeing	Women's K-1 500 m	26 November 2021
Gold medal	Ricardo Valencia	Shooting	Men's 10 m air pistol	26 November 2021
Gold medal	Angie Venegas	Taekwondo	Women's -49 kg	26 November 2021
Gold medal	Uriel Gomeztagle	Taekwondo	Men's -68 kg	26 November 2021
Gold medal	Anahí Álvarez	Triathlon	Women's individual	26 November 2021
Gold medal	José Eguia	Canoeing	Men's K-1 200 m	27 November 2021
Gold medal	Osmar Olvera	Diving	Men's 1 m Springboard	27 November 2021
Gold medal	Alejandra Estudillo	Diving	Women's 10 m Platform	27 November 2021
Gold medal	Leonel Cárdenas	Squash	Men's Individual	27 November 2021
Gold medal	Athena Meneses	Swimming	Women's 200 m backstroke	27 November 2021
Gold medal	Leslie Soltero	Taekwondo	Women's -67 kg	27 November 2021
Gold medal	Dafne Quintero; Sebastian Garcia	Archery	Mixed team compound	28 November 2021
Gold medal	Dafne Quintero	Archery	Women's individual compound	28 November 2021
Gold medal	Sebastian Garcia	Archery	Men's individual compound	28 November 2021
Gold medal	Valentina Vázquez; Akshara Licea	Archery	Women's team recurve	28 November 2021
Gold medal	Carlos Vaca; Jesús Flores Alanis	Archery	Men's team recurve	28 November 2021
Gold medal	Valentina Vázquez	Archery	Women's individual recurve	28 November 2021
Gold medal	Frida Zúñiga	Diving	Women's 3 m Springboard	28 November 2021
Gold medal	Randal Willars	Diving	Men's 10 m Platform	28 November 2021
Gold medal	Andrés Puente	Swimming	Men's 200 m breaststroke	28 November 2021
Gold medal	Tayde Sansores	Swimming	Women's 100 m backstroke	28 November 2021
Gold medal	Diego Camacho	Swimming	Men's 100 m backstroke	28 November 2021
Gold medal	Victoria Velasco; Yareli Acevedo	Cycling	Women's Madison	29 November 2021
Gold medal	Jorge Peyrot; Jose Muñiz	Cycling	Men's Madison	29 November 2021
Gold medal	Ricardo Torres	Gymnastics	Men's Vault	29 November 2021
Gold medal	Fabiola Cabello; Paola Franco	Squash	Women's doubles	29 November 2021
Gold medal	Dina Anguiano; Leonel Cárdenas	Squash	Mixed doubles	29 November 2021
Gold medal	Noemi Rodríguez	Weightlifting	Women's +87 kg	29 November 2021
Gold medal	Andres Dupont; Andres Puente; Ascanio Pinto; Diego Camacho	Swimming	Men's 4 x 100 m medley relay	30 November 2021
Gold medal	Juan Salazar; Leonardo Vargas; Leonel Cárdenas	Squash	Men's team	1 December 2021
Gold medal	Anahi Alvarez	Athletics	Women's 1500 m	2 December 2021
Gold medal	Luis Avilés	Athletics	Men's 400 m	2 December 2021
Gold medal	Yareli Acevedo	Cycling	Women's road race	2 December 2021
Gold medal	Mayran Oliver	Modern pentathlon	Women's individual	2 December 2021
Gold medal	Arantxa Cossio; Clio Barcenas	Table tennis	Women's doubles	2 December 2021
Gold medal	Geraldine Vasquez; Itzamary Gonzalez; Marla Arellano; Miranda Barrera; Paulina Parra; Samantha Carmona; Veronica Aranda; Ximena Ortiz	Artistic swimming	Women's team	3 December 2021
Gold medal	Anahi Alvarez	Athletics	Women's 5000 m	3 December 2021
Gold medal	Erick Gordillo	Athletics	Men's High jump	3 December 2021
Gold medal	Itzamary Gonzalez; Marla Arellano	Artistic swimming	Women's Duet	4 December 2021
Gold medal	Geraldine Vasquez; Itzamary Gonzalez; Marla Arellano; Miranda Barrera; Paulina Parra; Samantha Carmona; Veronica Aranda; Ximena Ortiz	Artistic swimming	Women's Highlight	4 December 2021
Gold medal	Anette Alondra; Pamela Burguete; Georgina Hernandez; Idalia Lecuona; Giselle Osorio	Gymnastics	Women's rhythmic group all-around	4 December 2021
Gold medal	Mariola Garcia	Gymnastics	Women's trampoline	4 December 2021
Gold medal	Aylin Ibarra; Mildred Mercado	Rowing	Women's Double skiff	4 December 2021
Gold medal	Mariana Aguilar Chavez	Sailing	Women's IQ Foil	4 December 2021
Gold medal	Anette Alondra; Pamela Burguete; Georgina Hernandez; Idalia Lecuona; Giselle Osorio	Gymnastics	Women's rhythmic group 5 balls	5 December 2021
Gold medal	Mayran Oliver; Lorenzo Macias	Modern pentathlon	Mixed Relay	5 December 2021
Silver medal	Alejandra Estudillo; María Sánchez; Osmar Olvera; Randal Willars	Diving	Mixed team	25 November 2021
Silver medal	Gustavo Eslava	Canoeing	Men's C-1 1000 m	26 November 2021
Silver medal	Rosamaría Gonzalez; Stephanie Rodriguez	Canoeing	Women's C-2 500 m	26 November 2021
Silver medal	José Adrián Félix; Roberto Eguia; Juan Pablo Rodriguez; Alonso Reyes	Canoeing	Men's K-4 500 m	26 November 2021
Silver medal	Isabel Aburto; Karen Berrelleza; Arisdelsy Gonzalez; Carolina Moreno	Canoeing	Women's K-4 500 m	26 November 2021
Silver medal	Ricardo Peña	Cycling	Men's Omnium	26 November 2021
Silver medal	María José Vizcaino; Melanie Ramirez; Guadalupe Martinez	Cycling	Women's Team Sprint	26 November 2021
Silver medal	Renata Ortiz	Judo	Women's -52 kg	26 November 2021
Silver medal	Arath Juárez	Judo	Men's -60 kg	26 November 2021
Silver medal	Itzel Granados	Skateboarding	Women's Street	26 November 2021
Silver medal	Elizabeth Nieves	Shooting	Women's Air Rifle	26 November 2021
Silver medal	Andrés Puentes	Swimming	Men's 100 m Breastroke	26 November 2021
Silver medal	Athena Meneses; Celia del Rocío Pulido; Susana Hernandez; Tayde Sansores	Swimming	Women's 4 × 100 m freestyle relay	26 November 2021
Silver medal	Alberto Gómez; Diego Camacho; Guillermo Cruz; Mariano Jasso	Swimming	Men's 4 × 100 m freestyle relay	26 November 2021
Silver medal	Mercedes Romero	Triathlon	Women's	26 November 2021
Silver medal	Eduardo Nuñez	Triathlon	Men's	26 November 2021
Silver medal	Yesica Hernández	Weightlifting	Women's -49 kg	26 November 2021
Silver medal	Esmeralda Borrego	Weightlifting	Women's -55 kg	26 November 2021
Silver medal	Miguel Figueroa; José Gil	Canoeing	Men's C-2 1000 m	27 November 2021
Silver medal	Nicole Cordova; Romina Hinojosa; Victoria Velasco; Yareli Acevedo	Cycling	Women's team pursuit	27 November 2021
Silver medal	Kevin Muñoz	Diving	Men's 1 m Springboard	27 November 2021
Silver medal	Frida Zúñiga	Diving	Women's 10 m Platform	27 November 2021
Silver medal	Dina Anguiano	Squash	Women's Individual	27 November 2021
Silver medal	Diego Camacho	Swimming	Men's 200 m backstroke	27 November 2021
Silver medal	Andres Dupont; Guillermo Cruz; Susana Hernández; Tayde Sansores	Swimming	Mixed 4 x 100 m freestyle relay	27 November 2021
Silver medal	Juan Esquivel	Taekwondo	Men's +80 kg	27 November 2021
Silver medal	Mauricio Canul	Weightlifting	Men's 81 kg	27 November 2021
Silver medal	Queysi Rojas	Weightlifting	Women's 64 kg	27 November 2021
Silver medal	Carlos Vaca; Valentina Vazquez	Archery	Mixed team recurve	28 November 2021
Silver medal	Jesus Flores Alanis	Archery	Men's individual recurve	28 November 2021
Silver medal	Yareli Acevedo	Cycling	Women's Omnium	28 November 2021
Silver medal	Carlos Quintero; Elizabet Nieves	Shooting	Mixed team air rifle	28 November 2021
Silver medal	Andrea Ibarra; Ricardo Valencia	Shooting	Mixed team air pistol	28 November 2021
Silver medal	Anahi Alvarez; Mercedes Romero; Eduardo Nuñez; Erick Ramos	Triathlon	Mixed Team	28 November 2021
Silver medal	Jonathan Ramos	Weightlifting	Men's 96 kg	28 November 2021
Silver medal	Antonio Govea	Weightlifting	Men's 109 kg	28 November 2021
Silver medal	Andres Puente; Ascanio Fernandez; Ariel Molina; Athena Meneses; Diego Camacho; Mariana Ortega; Susana Hernandez; Tayde Sansores	Swimming	Mixed 4 x 100 m medley relay	28 November 2021
Silver medal	María Vizcaino	Cycling	Women's Sprint	29 November 2021
Silver medal	Jorge Peyrot; Jose Muñiz; Ricardo Peña; Tomar Aguirre	Cycling	Men's team pursuit	29 November 2021
Silver medal	Juan Salazar; Leonardo Vargas	Squash	Men's doubles	29 November 2021
Silver medal	María de Jesús Ruíz	Athletics	Women's 10,000 m	30 November 2021
Silver medal	Santiago Lopez	Roller sports	Men's 1,000 metre sprint	30 November 2021
Silver medal	Athena Meneses; Mariana Ortega; Susana Hernandez; Tayde Sansores	Swimming	Women's 4 × 100 m medley relay	30 November 2021
Silver medal	Margarita Murgia	Boxing	Women's 51 kg	1 December 2021
Silver medal	Rosa De La Luz	Boxing	Women's 57 kg	1 December 2021
Silver medal	María Guadalupe Rodríguez	Boxing	Women's 69 kg	1 December 2021
Silver medal	Yareli Acevedo	Cycling	Women's time trial	1 December 2021
Silver medal	Fabiola Cabello; Dina Anguiano	Squash	Women's team	1 December 2021
Silver medal	Juan Gomez; Arantxa Cossio	Table tennis	Mixed doubles	1 December 2021
Silver medal	Beder Cantu	Wrestling	Men's Greco-Roman -130 kg	1 December 2021
Silver medal	Verónica Talamanes	Athletics	Women's 1500 m	2 December 2021
Silver medal	Ana Cecilia Meza	Modern pentathlon	Women's individual	2 December 2021
Silver medal	Valeria Idiaquez	Roller sports	Women's 10,000 points	2 December 2021
Silver medal	Gabriel Diaz; Julio Lopez	Rowing	Men's M2-	2 December 2021
Silver medal	Aylin Ibarra; Mildred Mercado	Rowing	Women's W2-	2 December 2021
Silver medal	Lillianna Garcia; Ana Rosas; Desiree Hernández; Yanina Treviño; Anahi Pintado; Jordyn Villanueva; Romina Ruelas; Ximena Zamarron; Edith De Leija; Leeslye Valdez; Marlene Espinoza; Alondra Dominguez; Mariangel Barbosa Karen Lizarraga; Jenny Robledo; Kimberli Rodas	Softball	Women's tournament	2 December 2021
Silver medal	Arantxa Cossio	Table tennis	Women's W2-	2 December 2021
Silver medal	Zeltzin Hernandez	Wrestling	Women's Freestyle -53 kg	2 December 2021
Silver medal	Ximena Ortiz; Diego Villalobos	Artistic swimming	Mixed duet	3 December 2021
Silver medal	Juan Pablo Rodriguez; Oscar Reyes; Jordy Gutierrez; Tomas Manzanillo	Rowing	Men's M4x	3 December 2021
Silver medal	Devanih Plata; Lilian Armenta; Maria Garcia; Mildred Mercado	Rowing	Women's W4-	3 December 2021
Silver medal	Aylin Ibarra; Mildred Mercado; Monica Romero; Ximena Santibañez	Rowing	Women's W4x	3 December 2021
Silver medal	Maria Fernanda Martínez; Julia Garcia	Tennis	Women's doubles	3 December 2021
Silver medal	Hector Gonzalez	Wrestling	Men's Freestyle -65 kg	3 December 2021
Silver medal	Sandra Escamilla	Wrestling	Women's Freestyle -68 kg	3 December 2021
Silver medal	César Gomez	Athletics	Men's 3000 m steeplechase	4 December 2021
Silver medal	Mariola García; María José Gonzalez	Gymnastics	Women's synchronized	4 December 2021
Silver medal	Victor Valdovinos	Karate	Men's -75 kg	4 December 2021
Silver medal	Hugo Reyes; Jordy Gutierrez	Rowing	Men's M2x	4 December 2021
Silver medal	Juan Lazaro	Wrestling	Men's Freestyle -86 kg	4 December 2021
Silver medal	Luis Orozco	Wrestling	Men's Freestyle -125 kg	4 December 2021
Silver medal	Anette Luna; Idalia Lecuona; Johan Hernandez; Naomi Osorio; Pamela Burguete	Gymnastics	Women's rhythmic group 5 ribbons	5 December 2021
Silver medal	Crista Hernández	Gymnastics	Women's rhythmic individual ball	5 December 2021
Silver medal	Irma Delgado	Karate	Women's -50 kg	5 December 2021
Silver medal	Ericka Luque	Karate	Women's -55 kg	5 December 2021
Silver medal	Pamela Campos	Karate	Women's +84 kg	5 December 2021
Silver medal	Clio Barcenas; Arantxa Cossio	Table tennis	Women's team	5 December 2021
Silver medal	Hiram Bravo; Jonathan Cabrera; Josue Lopez Rios; Diego Gonzalez; Axel Tellez Rodriguez; Yasutaka Sanay; Jorge Sandoval; Edgar Mendoza; Aldo Zambrano; Victor Manuel Parra; Oziel Aguirre; Luis Hernadez	Volleyball	Men's tournament	5 December 2021
Bronze medal	Juan Pablo Rodríguez	Canoeing	Men's K-1 1000 m	26 November 2021
Bronze medal	Isabel Aburto; Karen Berrelleza	Canoeing	Women's K-2 500 m	26 November 2021
Bronze medal	Francisco Contreras; Juan Carlos Ruiz; Ridley Malo	Cycling	Men's Team Sprint	26 November 2021
Bronze medal	Randal Willars	Diving	Men's 3 m Springboard	26 November 2021
Bronze medal	Paulina Garnica	Judo	Women's -57 kg	26 November 2021
Bronze medal	Jorge Eduardo Perez	Judo	Men's -73 kg	26 November 2021
Bronze medal	Juan Rodríguez; Oscar Reyes	Canoeing	Men's K-2 1000 m	27 November 2021
Bronze medal	Isabel Aburto	Canoeing	Women's K-1 200 m	27 November 2021
Bronze medal	Stephanie Rodríguez	Canoeing	Women's C-1 200 m	27 November 2021
Bronze medal	Andrea Ibarra	Shooting	Women's air pistol	27 November 2021
Bronze medal	Paloma Garcia	Taekwondo	Women's +67 kg	27 November 2021
Bronze medal	Jeremy Olivares	Judo	Men's -90 kg	27 November 2021
Bronze medal	Alejandra Martinez; Gabriela Mendoza; Mariangela Flores; Mariana Malpica	Gymnastics	Women's artistic team all-around	27 November 2021
Bronze medal	Celia Pulido	Swimming	Women's 100 m backstroke	28 November 2021
Bronze medal	Guillermo Cruz	Swimming	Men's 100 m freestyle	28 November 2021
Bronze medal	Luis Montoya	Badminton	Men's singles	29 November 2021
Bronze medal	Juan Carlos Ruíz	Cycling	Men's Keirin	29 November 2021
Bronze medal	Mariangela Flores	Gymnastics	Women's Floor	29 November 2021
Bronze medal	Andrea Pérez	Bowling	Women's singles	30 November 2021
Bronze medal	Verónica Talamanes	Athletics	Women's 800 m	1 December 2021
Bronze medal	Gema Morales	Boxing	Women's 60 kg	1 December 2021
Bronze medal	Darianne Hernández	Boxing	Women's 75 kg	1 December 2021
Bronze medal	Ángel López	Boxing	Men's 91 kg	1 December 2021
Bronze medal	Diego Macias	Wrestling	Men's Greco-Roman -77 kg	1 December 2021
Bronze medal	Pedro Bello	Wrestling	Men's Greco-Roman -87 kg	1 December 2021
Bronze medal	Daniel Veliz	Wrestling	Men's Greco-Roman -97 kg	1 December 2021
Bronze medal	Aldo Zavala	Athletics	Hammer throw	2 December 2021
Bronze medal	Paulina Romero	Wrestling	Women's Freestyle -57 kg	2 December 2021
Bronze medal	Omar Castillo	Athletics	Women's 10,000 m	3 December 2021
Bronze medal	Danna Barajas; Valeria Gonzalez; Verónica Talamanes; Yara Amador	Athletics	Women's 4 × 400 m relay	3 December 2021
Bronze medal	Guillermo Campos; Javier Martínez; Julio Díaz; Luis Avilés	Athletics	Men's 4 × 400 m relay	3 December 2021
Bronze medal	Diego Cervantes	Fencing	Men's Foil	3 December 2021
Bronze medal	Jimena Torres	Fencing	Women's Foil	3 December 2021
Bronze medal	Emilio Garcia; Gabriel Diaz; Julio Lopez; Luis Garcia	Rowing	Men's M4-	3 December 2021
Bronze medal	Emiliano Aguilera; Julia Garcia	Tennis	Mixed doubles	3 December 2021
Bronze medal	Erick Barroso	Wrestling	Men's Freestyle -57 kg	3 December 2021
Bronze medal	Guillermo Campos	Athletics	Men's 110 m hurdles	4 December 2021
Bronze medal	Atenas Gutiérrez; Esperanza Albarrán	Beach volleyball	Women's tournament	4 December 2021
Bronze medal	Ricardo Amador	Fencing	Men's Epeé	4 December 2021
Bronze medal	Adrián Martínez	Gymnastics	Men's Individual	4 December 2021
Bronze medal	Adrián Martínez; José Hugo Marín	Gymnastics	Men's synchronized	4 December 2021
Bronze medal	Pamela Campos	Karate	Women's -68 kg	4 December 2021
Bronze medal	Cristobal Hagerman	Sailing	Men's Windsurfing	4 December 2021
Bronze medal	Josue Campos	Wrestling	Men's Freestyle -97 kg	4 December 2021
Bronze medal	Hermann Adriano	3x3 Basketball	Mixed Shoot Out	5 December 2021
Bronze medal	Hugo Castro	Fencing	Men's Sabre	5 December 2021
Bronze medal	Natalia Botello	Fencing	Women's Sabre	5 December 2021
Bronze medal	Sofía Pérez	Gymnastics	Women's rhythmic individual ribbon	5 December 2021

Medals by Sport
Sport	1st place, gold medalist(s)	2nd place, silver medalist(s)	3rd place, bronze medalist(s)	Total
Archery	6	2	0	8
Swimming	5	7	2	14
Athletics	4	3	6	13
Gymnastics	4	3	5	12
Diving	4	3	1	8
Squash	4	3	0	7
Cycling	3	7	2	12
Taekwondo	3	1	1	5
Artistic Swimming	3	1	0	4
Canoeing	2	5	5	12
Modern pentathlon	2	1	0	3
Rowing	1	6	1	8
Weightlifting	1	6	0	7
Shooting	1	3	1	5
Triathlon	1	3	0	4
Table Tennis	1	3	0	4
Sailing	1	0	1	2
Wrestling	0	6	6	12
Karate	0	4	1	5
Boxing	0	3	3	6
Judo	0	2	3	5
Roller sports	0	2	0	2
Volleyball	0	1	1	2
Tennis	0	1	1	2
Skateboarding	0	1	0	1
Softball	0	1	0	1
Fencing	0	0	5	5
Badminton	0	0	1	1
Bowling	0	0	1	1
Basketball	0	0	1	1
Total	46	78	48	172

== Competitors ==
The following is the list of number of competitors (per gender) participating at the games per sport/discipline.

Sport	Men	Women	Total
3x3 basketball	4	4	8
Archery	3	3	6
Artistic swimming	1	8	9
Athletics	21	13	34
Badminton	2	2	4
Beach volleyball	2	2	4
Bowling	2	2	4
Boxing	5	7	12
Canoeing	7	6	13
Cycling	14	15	29
Diving	4	3	7
Fencing	3	3	6
Gymnastics	6	13	19
Handball	14	14	28
Judo	7	6	13
Karate	3	3	6
Modern pentathlon	2	2	4
Roller sports	3	3	6
Rowing	8	8	16
Sailing	2	2	4
Shooting	4	4	8
Softball	Bye	16	16
Squash	3	3	6
Swimming	13	13	26
Table tennis	2	2	4
Taekwondo	2	3	5
Tennis	2	2	4
Triathlon	2	2	4
Volleyball	12	12	24
Weightlifting	5	5	10
Wrestling	12	5	17
Total	170	186	356

== Archery ==
Men's

Athlete	Event	Ranking Round		Round of 16	Quarterfinals	Semifinals	Final / BM	Rank	2023 Pan American Games qualification
Athlete	Event	Score	Seed	Opposition Score	Opposition Score	Opposition Score	Opposition Score	Rank	2023 Pan American Games qualification
Sebastián Quintero	Compound individual	705 x31	2	Bye	Infante (CHI); W 149 – 145	Gonzalez (CRC); W 147(10) – 147 (9)	Frederick (USA); W 147–143	Gold medal	
Carlos Vaca	Recurve individual	653 x8	4	Charris (COL); W 6 – 2	Flores (MEX); L 2 – 6	Did not advance		5	
Jesús Flores	Recurve individual	649 x7	5	Pacheco (BRA); W 7 – 1	Vaca (MEX); W 6 – 2	D'Amour (ISV); W 6 – 2	Cowles (USA); L 5 – 6	Silver medal	
Carlos Vaca; Jesús Flores	Recurve team	1302 x15	2			Puerto Rico; W 6 – 0	United States; W 6 – 0	Gold medal	—
Dafne Quintero	Compound individual	699 x22	1	Bye	Alcaino (BRA); W 145 – 136	Corado (ESA); W 149 – 139	Suárez (COL); W 143 – 141	Gold medal	
Akshara Bautista	Recurve individual	634 x6	4	Teodoro (BRA); W 7 – 1	Vazquez (MEX); L 0 – 6	Did not advance		5	
Valentina Vazquez	Recurve individual	625 x4	5	Yepes (COL); W 6 – 2	Bautista (MEX); W 6 – 0	Kaufhold (USA); W 6 – 0	Zuluaga (COL); W 6 – 0	Gold medal	
Akshara Bautista; Valentina Vazquez	Recurve team	1259 x10	2			Brazil; W 6 – 2	United States; W 6 – 0	Gold medal	—
Valentina Vazquez; Carlos Vaca	Recurve team	1287 x9	2		El Salvador; W 6 – 0	Brazil; W 5 – 3	United States; L 3 – 5	Silver medal	—
Dafne Quintero; Sebastián Quintero	Compound team	1404 x53	2		Brazil; W 153 – 146	United States; W 155 – 153	Colombia; W 154 – 153	Gold medal	—

== Artistic swimming ==
Athlete	Event	Technical Routine		Free Routine (Final)			
Athlete	Event	Points	Rank	Points	Rank	Total Points	Rank
Itzamary Gonzalez; Marla Arellano	Women's duet	81.1175	1	82.2000	1	163.3175	Gold medal
Geraldine Vasquez; Itzamary Gonzalez; Marla Arellano; Miranda Barrera; Paulina Parra; Samantha Carmona; Veronica Aranda; Ximena Ortiz	Women's team	80.2504	1	83.5667	1	163.8171	Gold medal
Geraldine Vasquez; Itzamary Gonzalez; Marla Arellano; Miranda Barrera; Paulina Parra; Samantha Carmona; Veronica Aranda; Ximena Ortiz	Women's highlight					82.8000	Gold medal
Ximena Ortiz; Diego Villalobos	Mixed duet	75.2413	2	77.2000	2	152.4413	Silver medal

== Athletics ==
=== Track & road events ===
Men

Athlete	Event	Semifinal		Final		2023 Pan American Games qualification
Athlete	Event	Result	Rank	Result	Rank	2023 Pan American Games qualification
Gerardo Lomelí	100 m	10.77	6		12	
Gerardo Lomelí	200 m	21.61	5		11	
Javier Martínez	200 m	21.49	6		10	
Luis Avilés	400 m	46.23	1 Q	45.59	Gold medal	
Julio Díaz	800 m			01:55.67	8	
Israel Tinajero	800 m			01:50.43	4	
Israel Tinajero	1500 m			03:50.39	5	
Diego García	1500 m			03:53.84	7	
Diego García	5000 m			DNF		
Mario López Suarez	5000 m			14:55.07	4	
Omar Castillo	10,000 m			31:07.02	Bronze medal	
Victor Zambrano	10,000 m			DQF		
Guillermo Campos	110 m hurdles	14.09	1 Q	14.05	Bronze medal	
Guillermo Campos	400 m hurdles	DNF		—		
Sergio Esquivel	400 m hurdles	52.20	4 Q	51.91	5	
César Gomez	3000 m steeplechase			08:56.65	Silver medal	
Gerardo Villareal	3000 m steeplechase			09:11.60	5	
Saúl Mena	20,000 m walk			1h 27:23.72	5	
Ismael Bernal	20,000 m walk			1h 33:41.47	10	
Gerardo Lomelí; Guillermo Campos; Javier Martínez; Luis Avilés	4 × 100 m relay			41.55	4	—
Guillermo Campos; Javier Martínez; Julio Díaz; Luis Avilés	4 × 400 m relay			03:08.85	Bronze medal	—

Women

Athlete	Event	Semifinal		Final		2023 Pan American Games qualification
Athlete	Event	Result	Rank	Result	Rank	2023 Pan American Games qualification
Valeria Gonzalez	800 m			02:10.38	5	
Verónica Talamanes	800 m			02:09.40	Bronze medal	
Verónica Talamanes	1500 m			04:30.13	Silver medal	
Anahí Alvarez	1500 m			04:20.68	Gold medal	
Anahí Alvarez	5000 m			15:52.80	Gold medal	
María de Jesús Ruíz	10,000 m			35:02.77	Silver medal	
Luisa Baca	10,000 m			36:25.03	6	
María Fernanda Patrón	100 m hurdles			14.48	8	
Yara Amador	400 m hurdles	01:01.37	4 Q	01:01.70	6	
Danna Barajas	400 m hurdles	01:00.89	4 Q	01:03.18	7	
Arian Chia	3000 m steeplechase			10:57.62	4	
Paola Cordero	3000 m steeplechase			12:03.42	10	
Sofía Ramos Rodríguez	20,000 m walk			DQF		
Danna Barajas; Valeria Gonzalez; Verónica Talamanes; Yara Amador	4 × 400 m relay			03:48.21	Bronze medal	—

Mixed

Athlete	Event	Final	
Athlete	Event	Result	Rank
Gerardo Lomelí; Israel Tinajero; Valeria Gonzalez; Verónica Talamanes	4 × 400 m relay	03:29.52	4

=== Field events ===
Men's

Athlete	Event	Final		2023 Pan American Games qualification
Athlete	Event	Result	Rank	2023 Pan American Games qualification
Erick Portillo	High jump	2.21 m	Gold medal	
Luis Fernández	Pole vault	4.80 m	6	
Josué García	Pole vault	DNM		
Víctor Castro	Triple jump	15.36 m	10	
Aldo Zavala	Hammer throw	63.95	Bronze medal	
Jonathan Absalon	Hammer throw	63.87	4	

Women's

Athlete	Event	Final		2023 Pan American Games qualification
Athlete	Event	Distance	Position	2023 Pan American Games qualification
Silvia Guerrero	Pole vault	3.90 m	4	
Aida Cruz	Pole vault	3.80 m	5	
Verónica Luzania	Discus throw	47.35	8	
Sofía Mojica	Discus throw	43.04	10	
Paola Bueno	Hammer throw	58.41	7	
Xóchitl Montoya	Javelin throw	42.87	8	

=== Track & Field ===
Men's

Athlete	Event	100 m		Long Jump		Shot Put		High Jump		400 m		110 m hurdles		Discus Throw		Pole Vault		Javelin Throw		1500 m		Final		2023 Pan American Games qualification
Athlete	Event	Time	Points	Distance	Points	Distance	Points	Distance	Points	Distance	Points	Time	Points	Distance	Points	Distance	Points	Distance	Points	Time	Points	Points	Position	2023 Pan American Games qualification
Miguel Ramirez	Decathlon	11.04	852	6.90 m	790	11.36 m	568	1.80 m	627	DQF	0	16.13	7118	33.84	541	3.80 m	562	56.05 m	679	05:02.73	544	5851	7	

Women's

Athlete	Event	100m hurdles		High Jump		Shot Put		200 m		Long Jump		Javelin Throw		800 m		Final		2023 Pan American Games qualification
Athlete	Event	Time	Points	Distance	Points	Distance	Points	Time	Points	Distance	Points	Distance	Points	Time	Points	Points	Position	2023 Pan American Games qualification
Zully Villegas	Heptathlon	14.90	855	1.46 m	689	10.77	580	25.68	825	5.36	660	38.56	640	02:28.22	715	4964	5	

== Badminton ==
Athlete	Event	Round of 32	Round of 16	Quarterfinal	Semifinal	Final / BM		2023 Pan American Games qualification
Athlete	Event	Opposition Score	Opposition Score	Opposition Score	Opposition Score	Opposition Score	Rank	2023 Pan American Games qualification
Luis Montoya	Men's singles	Zorrilla (DOM); W 2–0 (21–9, 21–11)	Yang (USA); W 2–0 (21–16, 21–17)	Baque (ECU); W 2–0 (21–14, 21–17)	Canjura (ESA); L 1–2 (21–19, 8–21, 17–21)	Did not advance	Bronze medal	
Armando Gaitán	Men's singles	Averia (USA); L 0–2 (7–21, 7–21)	Did not advance				17	
Vanesa García	Women's singles	Baque (ECU); W 2–0 (21–14, 21–17)	Gai (USA); L 0–2 (14–21, 11–21)	Did not advance			9	
Miriam Rodríguez	Women's singles	Paiz (GUA); L 0–2 (16–21, 18–21)	Did not advance				17	
Luis Montoya; Miriam Rodríguez	Mixed doubles		Peru; W 2–0 (9–21, 21–16, 21–15)	Brazil; L 1–2 (21–19, 6–21, 14–21)	Did not advance		5	—

== 3x3 Basketball ==
=== Team Tournaments ===
Athlete	Event	Pool play				Quarterfinal	Semifinal	Reclassification 5º – 8º		Final / BM		2023 Pan American Games qualification
Athlete	Event	Opposition Score	Opposition Score	Opposition Score	Rank	Opposition Score	Opposition Score	Opposition Score	Opposition Score	Opposition Score	Rank	2023 Pan American Games qualification
Alfredo Ponton; Hermann Adriano; Jorge De La Cerna; Myron Molina	Men's tournament	Saint Lucia; W 21 – 9	Argentina; L 12 – 21	Chile; L 15 – 17	3	Did not advance					9	
Gloria Ortiz; Irene Plascencia; Martha Tapia; Patricia Serna	Women's tournament		El Salvador; W 12 – 11	Chile; L 10 – 18	2	Argentina; L 12 – 21	Did not advance	Uruguay; L 9 – 13	Ecuador; L 19 –7	Did not advance	7	

=== Individual Trial ===
Athlete	Event	Qualification		Final	
Athlete	Event	Result	Rank	Result	Rank
Gloria Ortiz	Shoot Out	3 (3.50s)	5	4 (10.80)	7
Hermann Adriano	Shoot Out	4 (7.30s)	2	7 (14.80)	Bronze medal

== Beach Volleyball ==
Athlete	Event	Pool play			Quarterfinal	Semifinal	Final / BM		2023 Pan American Games qualification
Athlete	Event	Opposition Score	Opposition Score	Rank	Opposition Score	Opposition Score	Opposition Score	Rank	2023 Pan American Games qualification
Miguel Sarabia; Raymond Stephens	Men's tournament	Bailon/ Gonzalez (URU); W 2 – 0 (21–16), (21–10)	Aravena/ Droguett (CHI); W 2 – 1 (15–21), (21–17), (15–12)	1	Noriega/ De La Hoz (COL); W 2 – 0 (21–17), (21–14)	Reyes/ Diaz (CUB); L 0 – 2 (21–19), (21–13)	Aravena/ Droguett (CHI); L 0 – 2 (14–21), (20–22)	4	
Atenas Gutiérrez; Esperanza Albarrán	Women's tournament	Mori/ Urretaviscaya (CHI); W 2 – 1 (21–12), (21–14)	Gaona/ Allcca (PER); W 2 – 1 (21–23), (21–14), (15–8)	1	Glagau/ Leanne (CAN); W 2 – 1 (21–23), (21–14), (15–8)	Navas/ Gonzalez (PUR); L 0 – 2 (12–21), (18–21)	Gaona/ Allcca (PER); W 2 – 1 (21–18), (21–17)	Bronze medal	

== Bowling ==
Athlete	Event	Qualification			Semifinal	Final / BM		2023 Pan American Games qualification
Athlete	Event	Total	Average	Rank	Opposition Score	Opposition Score	Rank	2023 Pan American Games qualification
Sergio Barajas	Men's singles	2459	204.9167	5	Did not advance		5	
Roberto Pérez	Men's singles	2193	182.750	11	Did not advance		11	
Sergio Barajas; Roberto Pérez	Men's doubles	4567	190.2916	5			5	—
Andrea Pérez	Women's singles	2414	201.1667	1	Duque (COL); L 327 – 451	—	Bronze medal	
Iliana Salinas	Women's singles	2158	179.8333	7	Did not advance		7	
Andrea Pérez; Iliana Salinas	Women's doubles	4488	187.000	4			4	—

== Boxing ==
Athlete	Event	Round of 16	Quarterfinals	Semifinals	Final		2023 Pan American Games qualification
Athlete	Event	Opposition Result	Opposition Result	Opposition Result	Opposition Result	Rank	2023 Pan American Games qualification
Jorge Nieto	52 kg	Bye	Astorga (ARG); L 1 – 4	Did not advance		5	
Brandon Mejía	57 kg		Colón (PUR); L 0 – 5	Did not advance		5	
Kevin Cantabrana	69 kg	Bye	Williams (USA); L 0 – 5	Did not advance		5	
José Ismael López	75 kg	Bye	Barrera (CUB); L 1 – 3	Did not advance		5	
Yair Gallardo	81 kg		De Oliveira (BRA); L 0 – 5	Did not advance		5	
Ángel López	91 kg		Bye	Murillo (COL); L 0 – 5	Did not advance	Bronze medal	
Aaron Amaro	+ 91 kg		Hurtado (COL); L 0 – 5	Did not advance		5	
Margarita Murgia	51 kg	Bye	Pardo (COL); W 4 – 1	Núñez (DOM); W 4 – 1	Gomez (USA); L 5 – 0	Silver medal	
Rosa De La Luz	57 kg	Bye	Ramírez (PAR); W RSC	Santamaría (PAN); W 5 – 0	Rodriguez (USA); L 5 – 0	Silver medal	
Gema Morales	60 kg		Sossa (BOL); W RSC	Camilo (COL); L 0 – 5	Did not advance	Bronze medal	
María Rodríguez	69 kg	Bye	Burgos (ARG); W 5 – 0	Couto (BRA); W 5 – 0	Guerra (USA); L 2 – 3	Silver medal	
Darianne Hernández	75 kg		Sativa (USA); W RSC	Yriza (VEN); L 0 – 5	Did not advance	Bronze medal	

== Canoeing ==
Men's

Athlete	Event	Qualification		Semifinal		Final		2023 Pan American Games qualification
Athlete	Event	Result	Rank	Result	Rank	Result	Rank	2023 Pan American Games qualification
Gustavo Eslava	C1 1000 m	04:02.39	2	Bye		04:17.27	Silver medal	
José Gil; Miguel Figueroa	C2 1000 m					03:34.07	Silver medal	—
Juan Pablo Rodriguez	K1 1000 m	03:53.49	4	03:50.51	2	03:48.66	Bronze medal	
José Eguia	K1 200 m	28.78	1	Bye		27.94	Gold medal	
Juan Pablo Rodriguez; Oscar Reyes	K2 1000 m	03:22.17	3	Bye		03:13.81	Bronze medal	—
José Eguia; José Félix Campa; Juan Pablo Rodriguez; Oscar Reyes	K4 500 m					01:26.60	Silver medal	—

Women's

Athlete	Event	Final		2023 Pan American Games qualification
Athlete	Event	Result	Rank	2023 Pan American Games qualification
Stephanie Rodriguez	C1 200 m	38.61	Bronze medal	
Stephanie Rodriguez; Ada Gonzalez	C2 500 m	02:03.54	Silver medal	—
Isabel Aburto	K1 200 m	35.02	Bronze medal	
Isabel Aburto	K1 500 m	01:59.92	Gold medal	
Isabel Aburto; Karen Berrelleza	K2 500 m	01:54.99	Bronze medal	—
Ailyn Gonzalez; Isabel Aburto; Karen Berrelleza; Laura Moreno	K4 500 m	01:46.26	Silver medal	—

== Cycling ==
=== Road ===
Athlete	Event	Final		2023 Pan American Games qualification
Athlete	Event	Result	Rank	2023 Pan American Games qualification
Jorge Peyrot	Men's time trial	32:50.43	10	
Jorge Martínez	Men's time trial	31:29.12	6	
Jorge Martínez	Men's road race	3h 08:39.50	6	
Carlos Rojas	Men's road race	3h 10:09.70	17	
Ricardo Peña	Men's road race	3h 10:40.00	23	
Jorge Peyrot	Men's road race	3h 11:53.20	27	
Romina Hinojosa	Women's time trial	24:35.49	11	
Yareli Acevedo	Women's time trial	22:16.73	Silver medal	
Yareli Acevedo	Women's road race	2h 09:48.00	Gold medal	
Katia Martínez	Women's road race	2h 10:20.20	5	
Romina Hinojosa	Women's road race	2h 11:22.30	13	
Victoria Velasco	Women's road race	2h 12:49.60	18	

=== Track ===
Sprint and Pursuit

Athlete	Event	Qualification		Round of 8	Quarterfinals	Semifinals	Repechage	Final/BM		2023 Pan American Games qualification
Athlete	Event	Time Speed (km/h)	Rank	Opposition Time Speed (km/h)	Opposition Time Speed (km/h)	Opposition Time Speed (km/h)	Opposition Time Speed (km/h)	Opposition Time Speed (km/h)	Rank	2023 Pan American Games qualification
Juan Carlos Ruíz	Men's Individual; Sprint	10.182 (70.713)	3	Vargas (ARG); W 10.764 (66.889)	Bone (ECU); W 10.520 (68.441); W 10.482 (68.689)	Echeverri (COL); L		Vilar (ARG); L	4	
Francisco Contreras	Men's Individual; Sprint	10.394 (69.270)	6	Bone (ECU); L	Ortega (COL); L	Did not advance	Guimares (BRA); Vargas (ARG); W 10.865 (66.267)	Ackee (TTO); Bone (ECU); Teran (VEN); W 10.783 (66.771)	5	
Juan Carlos Ruíz; Francisco Contreras; Ridley Malo	Men's Team; Sprint	46.426 (58.157)	3					Venezuela; W 46.302 (58.31)	Bronze medal	—
Jorge Peyrot; Jorge Muñiz; Ricardo Peña; Tomas Aguirre	Men's Team; Pursuit	4:08.049 (58.053)	2					Colombia; L 4:04.636 (58.863)	Silver medal	—
María José Vizcaíno	Women's Individual; Sprint	11.684 (61.622)	4	Urrutia (CHI); W 12.424 (57.952)	Samaniego (ECU); W 11.987 (60.065); W 12.078 (59.612)	Mosquera (COL); L W 11.990 (60.05); W 11.845 (60.939)		Salazar (COL); L	Silver medal	
Sofia Martinez	Women's Individual; Sprint	11.774 (61.151)	5	Samaniego (ECU); L	Salazar (COL); L	Did not advance	Urrutia (CHI); Constantino (BRA); W 12.079 (59.60)	Luna (ARG); Samaniego (ECU); Recio (CRC); L	6	
María José Vizcaíno; Sofia Martinez; Melanie Ramirez	Women's Team; Sprint	51.204 (52.730)	2					Colombia; L 50.903 (53.04)	Silver medal	—
Victoria Velasco; Yareli Acevedo; Romina Hinojosa; Nicole Cordova	Women's Team; Pursuit	4:40.962 (51.252)	2					Colombia; L Overlap	Silver medal	—

Keirin

Athlete	Event	Round 1	Repechage	Round 2	Final/BM	2023 Pan American Games qualification
Athlete	Event	Rank	Rank	Rank	Rank	2023 Pan American Games qualification
Juan Carlos Ruíz	Men's Keirin	2 Q	Bye	2 Q	Bronze medal	
Ridley Malo	Men's Keirin	1 Q	Bye	5	9	
María José Vizcaíno	Women's Keirin	2 Q			5	
Melanie Ramirez	Women's Keirin	5			7	

Madison

Athlete	Event	Sprints										Finish Order	Laps Down	Points	Rank	2023 Pan American Games qualification
Athlete	Event	1	2	3	4	5	6	7	8	9	10	Finish Order	Laps Down	Points	Rank	2023 Pan American Games qualification
Jorge Peyrot; Jorge Muñiz	Men's Madison	1	5	5	5	5	5	5	5	5	0	6	+1	61	Gold medal	—
Victoria Velasco; Yareli Acevedo	Women's Madison	5	2	3	5	5	5	2	6			2	0	33	Gold medal	—

Omnium

Athlete	Event	Scratch		Tempo Race				Elimination		Points Race		Total Points	Rank	2023 Pan American Games qualification
Athlete	Event	Rank	Points	Sprints	Rank	Lap Points	Points	Rank	Points	Rank	Points	Total Points	Rank	2023 Pan American Games qualification
Ricardo Peña	Men's Omnium	3	36	12	1	20	40	5	32	1	31	139	Silver medal	
Yareli Acevedo	Women's Omnium	2	38	4	3	20	36	3	36	3	17	127	Silver medal	

=== Mountain ===
Athlete	Event	Final		2023 Pan American Games qualification
Athlete	Event	Result	Rank	2023 Pan American Games qualification
Esteban Herrera	Men's Cross-country	1h 29:06.00	6	
Adair Gutierrez	Men's Cross-country	-1 LAP	11	
Monserrath Rodriguez	Women's Cross-country	1h 33:00.00	5	
Ana Ruth Clark	Women's Cross-country	-3 LAP	21	

=== BMX ===
Athlete	Event	Quarterfinals						Total Points	Rank	Semifinal	Final	2023 Pan American Games qualification
Athlete	Event	Race 1		Race 2		Race 3		Total Points	Rank	Semifinal	Final	2023 Pan American Games qualification
Athlete	Event	Rank	Points	Rank	Points	Rank	Points	Total Points	Rank	Rank	Rank	2023 Pan American Games qualification
Hugo Soto	Men's Racing	3	3	1	1	4	4	8	1 Q	4 Q	6	
Pamela Quintana	Women's Racing	4	4	4	4	5	5	13	4	Did not advance		
Alejandra Sandoval	Women's Racing	5	5	3	3	4	4	12	3 Q	6	Did not advance	

== Diving ==
Athlete	Event	Final		2023 Pan American Games qualification
Athlete	Event	Points	Rank	2023 Pan American Games qualification
Kevin Muñoz	1 m springboard	394.55	Silver medal	
Osmar Olvera	1 m springboard	412.85	Gold medal	
Osmar Olvera	3 m springboard	401.75	4	
Randal Willars	3 m springboard	404.40	Bronze medal	
Randal Willars	10 m platform	448.9	Gold medal	
Francisco Godinez	10 m platform	345.55	7	
María Sánchez	1 m springboard	224.4	10	
Alejandra Estudillo	1 m springboard	241.7	5	
Alejandra Estudillo	10 m platform	301.5	Gold medal	
Frida Zúñiga	10 m platform	286.9	Silver medal	
Frida Zúñiga	3 m springboard	292.7	Gold medal	
María Sánchez	3 m springboard	237.5	7	
Alejandra Estudillo; María Sánchez; Osmar Olvera; Randal Willars	Mixed team	468.35	Silver medal	—

== Fencing ==
Athlete	Event	Pool play						Round of 8	Quarterfinal	Semifinal	Final / BM		2023 Pan American Games qualification
Athlete	Event	Opposition Score	Opposition Score	Opposition Score	Opposition Score	Opposition Score	Rank	Opposition Score	Opposition Score	Opposition Score	Opposition Score	Rank	2023 Pan American Games qualification
Ricardo Amador	Men's Epeé	Romero (CUB); L 2 – 5	Pereira (BRA); W 5 – 1	Villacorta (ESA); L 4 – 5	Bernal (PAR); W 4 – 2		1	Bernal (PAR); W 15 – 6	Wu (USA); W 15 – 13	Valderrama (CHI); L 10 – 15	Did not advance	Bronze medal	
Diego Cervantes	Men's Foil	Quiñones (GUA); W 5 – 2	Cerquetti (ARG); L 4 – 5	Espinoza (PER); L 4 – 5	Aguinaga (ECU); W 5 – 0	Reyes (ESA); L 3 – 5	3	Aguinaga (ECU); W 15 – 8	Alarcón (CHI); W 15 – 9	Grajales (COL); L 13 – 15	Did not advance	Bronze medal	
Hugo Castro	Men's Sabre	Chinchilla (HON); W 5 – 1	Cantero (CUB); W 5 – 1	Berrio (USA); W 5 – 2	Montenegro (BRA); W 5 – 2	Bacha (ARG); W 5 – 4	1	Chinchilla (HON); W 15 – 7	Pinzon (COL); W 15 – 12	Monsalvo (CHI); L 13 – 15	Did not advance	Bronze medal	
Fernanda Morales	Women's Epeé	Farías (VEN); W 5 – 4	Jaramillo (COL); W 3 – 5	Díaz (PAN); W 5 – 2	Prafil (ARG); W 5 – 3		1	Prafil (ARG); W 15 – 12	Díaz Del Río (CHI); L 14 – 15	Did not advance		Bronze medal	
Jimena Torres	Women's Foil	Bradford (JAM); W 5 – 2	Aristud (PUR); W 5 – 0	Vinueza (ECU); W 5 – 2	Proestakis (CHI); L 4 – 5	Knoepffler (NCA); W 5 – 2	2	Kawasaki (PER); W 15 – 12	Victoria (PAN); W 15 – 7	Proestakis (CHI); L 15 – 8	Did not advance	Bronze medal	
Natalia Botello	Women's Sabre	Moolchandaney (CHI); W 5 – 3	Ramos (VEN); W 5 – 3	Endara (BOL); W 5 – 4	Barrera (GUA); W 5 – 1		1	Barrera (GUA); W 15 – 5	Leyva (COL); W 15 – 12	Peterlini (BRA); L 11 – 15	Did not advance	Bronze medal	

== Gymnastics ==
=== Artistic ===
Men's events

Athlete	Event	Qualification										Final										2023 Pan American Games qualification
Athlete	Event	Apparatus								Total	Rank	Apparatus								Total	Rank	2023 Pan American Games qualification
Athlete	Event	F	PH	R	V			PB	HB	Total	Rank	F	PH	R	V			PB	HB	Total	Rank	2023 Pan American Games qualification
Athlete	Event	F	PH	R	1	2	Average	PB	HB	Total	Rank	F	PH	R	1	2	Average	PB	HB	Total	Rank	2023 Pan American Games qualification
Mario Rojas	Individual; All-around	12.85	11.90	12.10	13.85	13.05	13.45	11.95	11.65											74.00	11	
Ricardo Torres	Individual; All-around	12.75	10.20	12.85	13.90	13.35	13.62	11.60	11.25											72.55	12	
Yamil Gonzalez	Individual; All-around	12.65	11.65	10.65	13.30			11.80	11.45											71.50	19	
Juan Pablo Porras	Individual; All-around	13.10	9.20	12.00	13.25			11.55	10.85											69.95	23	
Mario Rojas; Ricardo Torres; Yamil Gonzalez; Juan Pablo Porras	Team											38.70	33.75	36.95	41.050			35.35	34.05	219.85	4	—
Juan Pablo Porras	Floor	13.10									5	12.90									5	—
Mario Rojas	Horizontal Bars		11.90								9		10.30								6	—
Ricardo Torres	Rings			12.85							2			12.57							5	—
Ricardo Torres	Vault				13.625						11				14.100	13.166	13.633				Gold medal	—
Mario Rojas	Vault				13.45						15				13.533	12.966	13.249				6	—
Mario Rojas	Pommel Horse								11.65		9								10.30		6	—

Women's events

Athlete	Event	Qualification								Final								2023 Pan American Games qualification
Athlete	Event	Apparatus						Total	Rank	Apparatus						Total	Rank	2023 Pan American Games qualification
Athlete	Event	V			UB	BB	F	Total	Rank	V			UB	BB	F	Total	Rank	2023 Pan American Games qualification
Athlete	Event	1	2	Average	UB	BB	F	Total	Rank	1	2	Average	UB	BB	F	Total	Rank	2023 Pan American Games qualification
Marianna Malpica	Individual; All-around	13.40	12.95	13.175	11.65	11.80	11.70									48.55	8	
Mariangela Flores	Individual; All-around	12.95			10.75	11.55	12.55									47.80	10	
Gabriela Mendoza	Individual; All-around	12.40			10.20	11.60	11.30									45.500	18	
Joselyn Martínez	Individual; All-around	12.35			9.25	10.40	11.60									43.60	25	
Marianna Malpica; Mariangela Flores; Gabriela Mendoza; Joselyn Martínez	Team									38.75			32.60	34.95	35.85	142.15	Bronze medal	—
Marianna Malpica	Vault	13.40	12.95	13.175				13.175	7	13.233	12.766	12.999				12.999	4	—
Marianna Malpica	Uneven bars				11.65			11.65	9				11.366			11.366	5	—
Marianna Malpica	Floor						11.70	11.70	13						11.633	11.633	8	—
Mariangela Flores	Floor						12.55	12.55	5						12.333	12.333	Bronze medal	—
Mariangela Flores	Beam					11.55		11.55	11					12.066		12.066	4	—
Gabriela Mendoza	Beam					11.60		11.60	9					9.333		9.333	8	—

=== Rhythmic ===
Athlete	Event	Qualification						Final						2023 Pan American Games qualification
Athlete	Event	Hoop	Ball	Clubs	Ribbon	Total	Rank	Hoop	Ball	Clubs	Ribbon	Total	Rank	2023 Pan American Games qualification
Crista Hernández	Individual; All-around	18.800	20.150	19.100	13.950							72.000	4	
Sofía Pérez	Individual; All-around	13.950	15.200	17.050	17.200							63.400	6	
Crista Hernández	Hoop	18.800				18.800	4	17.75				17.75	6	—
Crista Hernández	Ball		20.150			20.150	3		20.450			20.450	Silver medal	—
Crista Hernández	Clubs			19.100		19.100	4			18.450		18.450	5	—
Crista Hernández	Ribbon				13.950	13.950	3				16.950	16.950	4	—
Sofía Pérez	Ribbon				17.200	17.200	8				17.950	17.950	Bronze medal	—
Sofía Pérez	Clubs			17.050		17.050	6			17.900		17.900	6	—
Anette Luna; Idalia Lecuona; Johan Hernandez; Naomi Osorio; Pamela Burguete	Group; All-around								33.400		22.950	56.350	Gold medal	—
Anette Luna; Idalia Lecuona; Johan Hernandez; Naomi Osorio; Pamela Burguete	5 Balls		33.400			33.400	1		33.650			33.650	Gold medal	—
Anette Luna; Idalia Lecuona; Johan Hernandez; Naomi Osorio; Pamela Burguete	5 Ribbons				22.950	22.950	2				19.650	19.650	Silver medal	—

=== Trampoline ===
Athlete	Event	Qualification				Final		2023 Pan American Games qualification
Athlete	Event	Score 1	Score 2	Total	Rank	Score	Rank	2023 Pan American Games qualification
Adrián Martínez	Men's Individual	46.065	53.975	100.040	5	55.110	Bronze medal	
José Hugo Marín	Men's Individual	45.775	53.030	98.805	7	53.740	4	
Adrián Martínez; José Hugo Marín	Men's synchronized	43.480		43.480	2	41.210	Bronze medal	—
Mariola García	Women's Individual	42.455	50.225	92.680	2	49.575	Gold medal	
María José Gonzalez	Women's Individual	41.630	43.380	85.010	8	47.935	4	
Mariola García; María José Gonzalez	Women's synchronized	41.130		41.130	3	43.32	Silver medal	—

== Handball ==
=== Men's ===
Summary

Team	Event	Group play				5–8th place semifinals	Final / BM		2023 Pan American Games qualification
Team	Event	Opposition Result	Opposition Result	Opposition Result	Rank	Opposition Result	Opposition Result	Rank	2023 Pan American Games qualification
Mexico	Men's tournament	Brazil; L 16 – 38	Chile; L 24 – 31	Puerto Rico; W 34 – 20	3	Colombia; W 34 – 31	Dominican Republic; W 36 – 24	5	

Squad

Men's Junior Mexico National Team
No.	Athlete	No.	Athlete
1	Braulio Esquer	13	Jose Galvez
4	Jesus Rivera	14	Alejandro Alvarez
5	Hector Perez	15	Jesus Loya
6	Sergio Guerrero	16	Donovan Zarco
9	Israel Bayardo	17	Gerson Hernandez
10	Ubaldo Marquez	18	Luis Ortiz
12	David Carrillo	21	Bryan Muñoz

Group A

Pos	Team	Pld	W	D	L	GF	GA	GD	Pts	Qualification
1	Brazil	3	3	0	0	117	54	+63	6	Semifinals
2	Chile	3	2	0	1	98	72	+26	4	Semifinals
3	Mexico	3	1	0	2	74	89	−15	2	5–8th place semifinals
4	Puerto Rico	3	0	0	3	53	127	−74	0	5–8th place semifinals

Group Play

29 November 2021; 09:00	Brazil	38–16	Mexico	Iván Vassilev Todorov Arena, Cali; Attendance: 260; Referees: Augusto, Poulet (USA)
29 November 2021; 09:00	Neto, T. Oliveira 6	(17–7)	Bayardo 6	Iván Vassilev Todorov Arena, Cali; Attendance: 260; Referees: Augusto, Poulet (USA)
29 November 2021; 09:00	1× (yellow card) 2× (suspension)	Report	3× (suspension)	Iván Vassilev Todorov Arena, Cali; Attendance: 260; Referees: Augusto, Poulet (USA)

30 November 2021; 11:40	Chile	31–24	Mexico	Iván Vassilev Todorov Arena, Cali; Attendance: 200; Referees: Correa B., Correa R. (BRA)
30 November 2021; 11:40	Salgado 9	(14–11)	Márquez 6	Iván Vassilev Todorov Arena, Cali; Attendance: 200; Referees: Correa B., Correa R. (BRA)
30 November 2021; 11:40	1× (yellow card) 5× (suspension) 1× (red card)	Report	2× (yellow card) 7× (suspension)	Iván Vassilev Todorov Arena, Cali; Attendance: 200; Referees: Correa B., Correa R. (BRA)

1 December 2021; 11:40	Mexico	34–20	Puerto Rico	Iván Vassilev Todorov Arena, Cali; Referees: Estrada, Pineda (COL)
1 December 2021; 11:40	Márquez, Rivera 6	(14–11)	K. Ocasio 6	Iván Vassilev Todorov Arena, Cali; Referees: Estrada, Pineda (COL)
1 December 2021; 11:40	1× (yellow card) 1× (suspension)	Report	1× (yellow card) 4× (suspension)	Iván Vassilev Todorov Arena, Cali; Referees: Estrada, Pineda (COL)

5–8th place semifinals

3 December 2021; 11:40	Mexico	34–31	Colombia	Iván Vassilev Todorov Arena, Cali; Attendance: 120; Referees: Augusto, Poulet (USA)
3 December 2021; 11:40	Álvarez 7	(17–16)	Melgarejo 11	Iván Vassilev Todorov Arena, Cali; Attendance: 120; Referees: Augusto, Poulet (USA)
3 December 2021; 11:40	1× (yellow card) 6× (suspension)	Report	2× (yellow card) 3× (suspension)	Iván Vassilev Todorov Arena, Cali; Attendance: 120; Referees: Augusto, Poulet (USA)

Fifth place game

4 December 2021; 11:40	Dominican Republic	24–36	Mexico	Iván Vassilev Todorov Arena, Cali; Referees: Pagoaga, Zambrano (HON)
4 December 2021; 11:40	López 11	(14–14)	Pérez 8	Iván Vassilev Todorov Arena, Cali; Referees: Pagoaga, Zambrano (HON)
4 December 2021; 11:40	2× (yellow card) 4× (suspension)	Report	1× (yellow card) 4× (suspension)	Iván Vassilev Todorov Arena, Cali; Referees: Pagoaga, Zambrano (HON)

=== Women's ===
Summary

Team	Event	Group play				5–8th place semifinals	Final / BM		2023 Pan American Games qualification
Team	Event	Opposition Result	Opposition Result	Opposition Result	Rank	Opposition Result	Opposition Result	Rank	2023 Pan American Games qualification
Mexico	Women's tournament	Argentina; D 32 – 32	Chile; L 29 – 36	Colombia; W 35 – 24	3	Dominican Republic; W 32 – 28	Cuba; L 36 – 39	6	

Squad

Women's Junior Mexico National Team
No.	Athlete	No.	Athlete
1	Angeles Tapia	11	Sayra Pereira
2	Gemma Leal	12	Esmeralda Vargas
3	Valeria Cuen	13	Jaqueline Lopez
4	Tamara Cervantes	14	Cinthia Gallegos
7	Angela Tapia	20	Ninive Diaz
9	Scarlett Velez	55	Debanhy Arriaga
10	Andrea Velasco	88	Gabriela Chavez

Group A

Pos	Team	Pld	W	D	L	GF	GA	GD	Pts	Qualification
1	Argentina	3	2	1	0	98	61	+37	5	Semifinals
2	Chile	3	2	0	1	85	80	+5	4	Semifinals
3	Mexico	3	1	1	1	96	92	+4	3	5–8th place semifinals
4	Colombia (H)	3	0	0	3	62	108	−46	0	5–8th place semifinals

(H) Hosts

Group Play

23 November 2021; 11:40	Argentina	32–32	Mexico	Iván Vassilev Todorov Arena, Cali; Referees: Augusto, Poulet (USA)
23 November 2021; 11:40	Lang 8	(15–16)	Leal 9	Iván Vassilev Todorov Arena, Cali; Referees: Augusto, Poulet (USA)
23 November 2021; 11:40	1× (yellow card) 3× (suspension)	Report	1× (yellow card) 5× (suspension)	Iván Vassilev Todorov Arena, Cali; Referees: Augusto, Poulet (USA)

24 November 2021; 09:00	Chile	36–29	Mexico	Iván Vassilev Todorov Arena, Cali; Attendance: 150; Referees: Burgos, Delgado (ARG)
24 November 2021; 09:00	Lovera 8	(14–10)	López 7	Iván Vassilev Todorov Arena, Cali; Attendance: 150; Referees: Burgos, Delgado (ARG)
24 November 2021; 09:00	1× (yellow card) 5× (suspension)	Report	1× (yellow card) 5× (suspension)	Iván Vassilev Todorov Arena, Cali; Attendance: 150; Referees: Burgos, Delgado (ARG)

25 November 2021; 10:20	Colombia	24–35	Mexico	Iván Vassilev Todorov Arena, Cali; Attendance: 150; Referees: Augusto, Poulet (USA)
25 November 2021; 10:20	Arcila, Córdoba 5	(10–17)	Pereira, Vargas 5	Iván Vassilev Todorov Arena, Cali; Attendance: 150; Referees: Augusto, Poulet (USA)
25 November 2021; 10:20	2× (yellow card) 4× (suspension)	Report	2× (suspension)	Iván Vassilev Todorov Arena, Cali; Attendance: 150; Referees: Augusto, Poulet (USA)

5–8th place semifinals

27 November 2021; 11:40	Mexico	32–28	Dominican Republic	Iván Vassilev Todorov Arena, Cali; Attendance: 235; Referees: Pagoaga, Zambrano (HON)
27 November 2021; 11:40	Tapia 10	(11–14)	Liranzo 10	Iván Vassilev Todorov Arena, Cali; Attendance: 235; Referees: Pagoaga, Zambrano (HON)
27 November 2021; 11:40	6× (suspension)	Report	3× (yellow card) 7× (suspension)	Iván Vassilev Todorov Arena, Cali; Attendance: 235; Referees: Pagoaga, Zambrano (HON)

Fifth place game

28 November 2021; 11:40	Cuba	39–36	Mexico	Iván Vassilev Todorov Arena, Cali; Attendance: 122; Referees: Augusto, Poulet (USA)
28 November 2021; 11:40	N. Rodríguez, Rosabal 10	(18–16)	Pereira 11	Iván Vassilev Todorov Arena, Cali; Attendance: 122; Referees: Augusto, Poulet (USA)
28 November 2021; 11:40	3× (suspension)	Report	3× (suspension)	Iván Vassilev Todorov Arena, Cali; Attendance: 122; Referees: Augusto, Poulet (USA)

== Judo ==
Athlete	Event	Round of 8	Quarterfinal	Semifinal	Repechage	Final / BM		2023 Pan American Games qualification
Athlete	Event	Opposition Score	Opposition Score	Opposition Score	Opposition Score	Opposition Score	Rank	2023 Pan American Games qualification
Arath Juárez	Men's -60 kg			Pepin (DOM); W 1 – 0		Garboa (ECU); L 0 – 1	Silver medal	
Robin Jara	Men's -66 kg		Bravo (CUB); L 0 – 1	Did not advance	Cusi (PER); W 1 – 0	Pereira (BRA); L 0 – 1	5	
Jorge Perez	Men's -73 kg			Tornal (DOM); L 0 – 1	Bye	Coronel (ECU); W 1 – 0	Bronze medal	
Javier Rosas	Men's -81 kg		Castro (DOM); L 0 – 1	Did not advance	Harrison (PAN); L 0 – 10	Did not advance	7	
Jeremy Olivares	Men's -90 kg		Salomon (BIZ); W 1 – 0	Knauf (USA); L 0 – 1	Bye	Gini (PAR); W 10 – 1	Bronze medal	
Angel Garcia	Men's -100 kg		Nieto (COL); L 0 – 1	Did not advance	Saquinaula (ECU); L 0 – 10	Did not advance	7	
Omar Silva	Men's +100 kg		Cruz (CUB); L 0 – 1	Did not advance	Mera (CHI); W 10 – 0	Lemes (BRA); L 1 – 10	5	
Kassandra Espinoza	Women's -48 kg			Nascimento (BRA); L 0 – 1	Solano (CRC); W 11 – 3	Candelo (PAN); L 0 – 1	5	
Renata Ortiz	Women's -52 kg		Huayhuameza (PER); W 12 – 2	Lopez (GUA); W 1 – 0		Diaz (VEN); L 0 – 1	Silver medal	
Paulina Garnica	Women's -57 kg		De Oliveira (BRA); L 3 – 10	Did not advance	Esquivel (CRC); W 1 – 0	Gavidia (ECU); W 1 – 0	Bronze medal	
Katia Castillo	Women's -63 kg			Sanchez (DOM); L 0 – 1	Bye	Golden (USA); L 0 – 1	5	
Elena Santos	Women's -70 kg		Aguiar (VEN); L 0 – 1	Did not advance	Delvecchio (ARG); L 0 – 10	Did not advance	7	
Priscila Martinez	Women's +78 kg		Leyton (PER); W 1 – 0	Morillo (DOM); L 0 – 1	Bye	Urdaneta (VEN); L 0 – 1	5	
Elena Santos; Jorge Perez; Paulina Garnica; Renata Ortiz; Jeremy Olivares; Omar Silva; Priscila Martinez	Mixed Team		Ecuador; W 4 – 0 (10–0, 10–0, 10-0, 10–0)	United States; L 2 – 4 (0–10, 0–1, 10–0, 1–0, 0–1, 0–1)	Bye	Dominican Republic; L 1 – 4 (1–0, 0–10, 0–10, 0-1, 0–1)	5	—

== Karate ==
Athlete	Event	Pool play				Semifinal	Final / BM		2023 Pan American Games qualification
Athlete	Event	Opposition Score	Opposition Score	Opposition Score	Rank	Opposition Score	Opposition Score	Rank	2023 Pan American Games qualification
Miguel Rodriguez	Men's -60 kg	Ruiz (USA); L 0 – 5	Dagua (COL); W 4 – 0	Rivas (VEN); L 0 – 1	3	Did not advance		5	
Victor Valdovinos	Men's -75 kg	Pinheiro (BRA); T 3 – 3	Servin (PAR); W 1 – 0	Guerra (CHI); W 3 – 0	1	Olaya (PER); W 1 – 0	Kasturi (USA); L 2 – 5	Silver medal	
Pablo Benavides	Men's +84 kg	Salgado (BRA); L 0 – 1	Kansara (USA); W 9 – 0	Desrosiers (CAN); W 4 – 0	2	Murillo (COL); W 3 – 0	Salgado (BRA); L 2 – 1	Silver medal	
Irma Delgado	Women's -50 kg	Mocchi (URU); W 6 – 1	Valdes (CHI); L 0 – 6	Alvarado (ECU); W 2 – 0	2	Alvarado (ECU); W 2 – 0	Lahyanssa (CAN); L 1 – 4	Silver medal	
Ericka Luque	Women's -55 kg	Allen (USA); T 0 – 0	Rochette (CAN); W 1 – 0	Fernandes (BRA); W 3 – 1	1	Miranda (ECU); W 6 – 0	Allen (USA); L 0 (0) – 0 (1)	Silver medal	
Pamela Campos	Women's +84 kg	Briones (ECU); W 1 (1) – 1 (0)	Hernandez (COL); W 3 – 2		1	Vergara (PUR); L 2 – 3	Did not advance	Bronze medal	

== Modern Pentathlon ==
Athlete	Event	Fencing (épée one touch)				Swimming (200 m freestyle)			Riding (show jumping)			Combined: shooting/running (10 m air pistol) / (3200 m)			Total points	Final rank	2023 Pan American Games qualification
Athlete	Event	RR	BR	Rank	MP points	Time	Rank	MP points	Penalties	Rank	MP points	Time	Rank	MP Points	Total points	Final rank	2023 Pan American Games qualification
Lorenzo Macias	Men's individual	241	3	4	244	02:03.30	3	304	21	8	279	11:38.11	4	602	1119	4	
Yoed Florido	Men's individual	223	0	6	223	02:08.20	10	294	Time	12	0	11:45.61	6	595	1422	6	
Mayran Oliver	Women's individual	250	1	2	251	02:27.23	12	256	7	4	293	12:55.00	1	526	1326	Gold medal	
Ana Cecilia Meza	Women's individual	286	2	1	288	02:19.56	5	271	0	2	299	14:39.00	6	421	1279	Silver medal	
Mayran Oliver; Lorenzo Macias	Mixed Relays	275	2	1	277	02:08.11	7	294	103	2	299	11:53.00	2	587	1457	Gold medal	—

== Roller Sports ==
=== Artistic skating ===
Athlete	Event	Short Program					Free Program					Total points	Final rank	2023 Pan American Games qualification
Athlete	Event	Total Element	Total Component	Deductions	Total	Rank	Technical	Total Component	Deductions	Total	Rank	Total points	Final rank	2023 Pan American Games qualification
Santiago Gonzalez	Men's individual	21.23	13.34	–1.0	33.57	4	34.50	18.93	0.0	53.43	5	87.00	5	
Carolina Zermeño	Women's individual	21.23	13.34	–1.0	16.5	7	22.08	13.63	–2.0	33.71	7	50.21	7	

=== Skateboarding ===
Athlete	Event	Runs		Tricks					Total points	Final rank	2023 Pan American Games qualification
Athlete	Event	1	2	1	2	3	4	5	Total points	Final rank	2023 Pan American Games qualification
Jesus Perales	Men's individual	6	4	0	0	0	0	7	17.57	6	
Itzel Granados	Women's individual	3	1	1	2	0	0	3	8.74	Silver medal	

=== Speed skating ===
Athlete	Event	Heat		Semifinal		Final		2023 Pan American Games qualification
Athlete	Event	Result	Rank	Result	Rank	Result	Rank	2023 Pan American Games qualification
Brandon Ovando	Men's 200 m					18.496	4	
Brandon Ovando	Men's 500 m	44.939	2	45.173	3	Did not advance		
Brandon Ovando	Men's lap			40.99	5	Did not advance		
Santiago Lopez	Men's 1,000 metre sprint			01:27.331	1	01:26.339	Silver medal	
Santiago Lopez	Men's 10,000 points					0 pts	8	
Santiago Lopez	Men's10,000 elimination						4	
Jocelyn Paniagua	Women's 200 m					21.02	7	
Jocelyn Paniagua	Women's 500 m	47.939	3	48.889	4	Did not advance		
Jocelyn Paniagua	Women's lap			35.604	3	Did not advance		
Valeria Idiaquez	Women's 1,000 metre sprint			01:37.239	2	Did not advance		
Valeria Idiaquez	Women's 10,000 points					17 pts	Silver medal	
Valeria Idiaquez	Women's 10,000 elimination						4	

== Rowing ==
Athlete	Event	Qualification		Repechage		Final A/B		2023 Pan American Games qualification
Athlete	Event	Result	Rank	Result	Rank	Result	Rank	2023 Pan American Games qualification
Adolfo Peralta Garcia	M1x	+00:04.86	2	07:50.94	1	07:48.83	6	
Gabriel Diaz; Julio Lopez	M2-					06:50.10	Silver medal	—
Hugo Reyes; Jordy Gutierrez	M2x	06:33.73	1			06:47.23	Silver medal	—
Emilio Garcia; Gabriel Diaz; Julio Lopez; Luis Garcia	M4-					06:36.41	Bronze medal	—
Juan Pablo Rodriguez; Oscar Reyes; Jordy Gutierrez; Tomas Manzanillo	M4x	03:22.17	3	Bye		05:56.08	Silver medal	—
Samantha Ojeda	W1x	08:29.28	2	Bye		07:55.30	4	
Devanih Plata; Lilian Armenta	W2					08:06.70	Silver medal	—
Aylin Ibarra; Mildred Mercado	W2x-					07:05.63	Gold medal	—
Devanih Plata; Lilian Armenta; Maria Garcia; Mildred Mercado	W4-					N/A	Silver medal	—
Aylin Ibarra; Mildred Mercado; Monica Romero; Ximena Santibañez	W4x					07:23.77	Silver medal	—

== Sailing ==
Athlete	Event	Sprints									Total Points	Net Points	Rank	2023 Pan American Games qualification
Athlete	Event	1	2	3	4	5	6	7	8	9	Total Points	Net Points	Rank	2023 Pan American Games qualification
Gerardo Benitez	Men's One Person Dinghy	~~7~~	6	4	4	1	2				24	17	4	
Cristobal Hagerman	Men's Windsurfing	5	1	4	2	3	2	5	5	~~6~~	33	27	Bronze medal	
Mariana Guzman	Women's One Person Dinghy	10	11	~~12~~	11	12	9				65	53	11	
Mariana Aguilar	Women's Windsurfing	1	1	1	1	1	1	~~2~~	1	2	11	9	Gold medal	

== Shooting ==
Summary

Athlete	Event	Qualification Round		Elimination Series		Final / BM	Rank	2023 Pan American Games qualification
Athlete	Event	Score	Seed	Score	Seed	Opposition Score	Rank	2023 Pan American Games qualification
Ricardo Valencia	Men's Air Rifle	565 x17	2			236.7	Gold medal	
Josue Meneses	Men's Air Rifle	558 x10	5			189.5	4	
Carlos Quintero	Men's Air Pistol	621.7	2			161.7	6	
Hugo Gonzalez	Men's Air Pistol	620.7	3			140.9	7	
Andrea Ibarra	Women's Air Rifle	555 x11	4			214	Bronze medal	
Heidy Alvarado	Women's Air Rifle	543 x13	8			146.1	6	
Luisa Marquez	Women's Air Pistol	619	2			246.3	2	
Elizabeth Nieves	Women's Air Pistol	615.2	6			160.7	6	
Andrea Ibarra; Ricardo Valencia	Mixed Air Rifle Team	563 x13	2	379 x9	1	United States; L 942 – 947	Silver medal	—
Carlos Quintero; Elizabeth Nieves	Mixed Air Pistol Team	617.9	2	410.1	2	United States; L 1028 – 1042.2	Silver medal	—

== Softball ==
Team	Event	Pool play				Super Round			Final / BM		2023 Pan American Games qualification
Team	Event	Opposition Result	Opposition Result	Opposition Result	Rank	Opposition Result	Opposition Result	Rank	Opposition Result	Rank	2023 Pan American Games qualification
Mexico	Women's tournament	Brazil; W 11 – 0	Venezuela; W 6 – 0	Puerto Rico; W 5 – 0	1	Peru; W 1 – 0	United States; L 0 – 6	2	United States; L 0 – 10	Silver medal	

Team roster

Softball at the 2021 Junior Panamerican Games – Mexico roster
Players		Coaches
Pitchers: 4 Lillianna Garcia; 9 Ana Rosas; 7 Desiree Hernández; 29 Yanina Treviño	Catchers: 45 Anahi Pintado; 99 Jordyn Villanueva; Infielders: 23 Romina Ruelas; 12 Ximena Zamarron; 2 Edith De Leija; 18 Leeslye Valdez; 16 Marlene Espinoza; 22 Alondra Dominguez; Outfielders: 11 Mariangel Barbosa; 1 Karen Lizarraga; 3 Jenny Robledo; 5 Kimberli Rodas	Manager: 0 Nancy Prieto; Coaches: Jorge Araujo; Martín Botello Zúñiga

Pool Play

27 November, 16:00 (UTC−5) Estadio Edgardo Schemel
Team	1	2	3	4	5	6	7	R	H	E
Mexico	0	4	0	7	x	x	x	11	11	0
Brazil	0	0	0	0	x	x	x	0	1	8

28 November, 16:00 (UTC−5) Estadio Edgardo Schemel
Team	1	2	3	4	5	6	7	R	H	E
Mexico	0	3	0	0	0	3	0	6	7	0
Venezuela	0	0	0	0	0	0	0	0	3	5

29 November, 16:00 (UTC−5) Estadio Edgardo Schemel
Team	1	2	3	4	5	6	7	R	H	E
Puerto Rico	0	0	0	0	0	0	0	0	4	4
Mexico	2	0	0	1	1	1	x	5	8	0

Super Round

30 November, 19:00 (UTC−5) Estadio Edgardo Schemel
Team	1	2	3	4	5	6	7	R	H	E
Peru	0	0	0	0	0	0	0	0	0	1
Mexico	0	0	0	0	0	0	1	1	7	0

1 December, 19:15 (UTC−5) Estadio Edgardo Schemel
Team	1	2	3	4	5	6	7	R	H	E
United States	0	0	0	1	1	0	4	6	9	0
Mexico	0	0	0	0	0	0	0	0	1	5

Gold Medal Match

2 December, 19:00 (UTC−5) Estadio Edgardo Schemel
Team	1	2	3	4	5	6	7	R	H	E
Mexico	0	0	0	0	x	x	x	0	0	9
United States	2	0	4	4	x	x	x	10	11	0

== Squash ==
Athlete	Event	Round of 32	Round of 16	Quarterfinals	Semifinals	Final / BM	Rank	2023 Pan American Games qualification
Athlete	Event	Opposition Score	Opposition Score	Opposition Score	Opposition Score	Opposition Score	Rank	2023 Pan American Games qualification
Leonel Cárdenas	Men's individual	Bye	Gálvez (PER); W 3 – 0 (11–2),(11–4),(11,6)	Azaña (ARG); W 3 – 0 (11–4),(11–6),(11,4)	Enriquez (GUA); W 3 – 0 (11–4),(11–9),(11,6)	Knudsen (COL); W 3 – 0 (11–8),(11–6),(11,3)	Gold medal	
Leonardo Vargas	Men's individual	Bye	Torrez (BOL); W 3 – 0 (11–3),(11–3),(11–2)	Pujol (ARG); L 1 – 3 (7–11),(6–11),(11–6), (3–11)	Did not advance		5	
Leonel Cárdenas; Leonardo Vargas	Men's doubles		Bye	Ecuador; W 2 – 0 (11–9),(11–10)	Brazil; W 2 – 1 (9–11),(11–7),(11–8)	Colombia; L 0 – 2 (6–11),(9–11)	Silver medal	—
Leonel Cárdenas; Leonardo Vargas	Men's team			Guatemala; W 1 – 0 (33–3)	Brazil; W 2 – 0 (33–24),(33–16)	Colombia; W 2 – 0 (33–16),(42–31)	Gold medal	—
Fabiola Cabello	Women's individual	Turnbull (CAY); W 3 – 0 (11–5),(11–5),(11–1)	Palacios (PAR); W 3 – 1 (6–11),(13–11),(11,9), (11–8)	Bautista (COL); L 0 – 3 (13–15),(9–11),(5–11)	Did not advance		5	
Dina Anguiano	Women's individual	Bye	Rios (BOL); W 3 – 0 (11–0),(11–5),(11–5)	Daniel (USA); W 3 – 2 (11–5),(8–11),(11–9), (8–11),(11–9)	Moya (ECU); W 3 – 1 (11–7),(11–9)(3–11), (8–11)	Stefanoni (USA); L 0 – 3 (4–11),(5–11),(4–11)	Silver medal	
Fabiola Cabello; Dina Anguiano	Women's doubles			Canada; W 2 – 0 (11–8),(11–9)	Ecuador; W 2 – 1 (11–6),(6–11),(11–7)	Colombia; W 2 – 1 (11–10),(8–11),(11–7)	Gold medal	—
Fabiola Cabello; Dina Anguiano	Women's team			Cayman Islands; W 3 – 0 (33–13),(33–12),(33–0)	Canada; W 3 – 0 (19–33),(33–14),(55–53)	United States; L 0 – 3 (19–41),(18–33),(9,22)	Silver medal	—
Leonel Cárdenas; Dina Anguiano	Mixed doubles			Canada; W 2 – 0 (11–5),(11–1)	Ecuador; W 2 – 0 (11–7),(11–7)	Colombia; W 2 – 1 (3–11),(11–7),(11–8)	Gold medal	—

== Swimming ==
Men's

Athlete	Event	Heats		Final A/B		2023 Pan American Games qualification
Athlete	Event	Result	Rank	Result	Rank	2023 Pan American Games qualification
Mariano Jasso	50m freestyle	23.44	2	23.21	7	
Guillermo Cruz	50m freestyle	23.25	3	23.10	5	
Guillermo Cruz	100m freestyle	50.68	2	50.37	Bronze medal	
Andres Dupont	100m freestyle	51.42	4	51.64	11	
Andres Dupont	200m freestyle	01:54.87	2	Did not advance		
Guillermo Cruz	200m freestyle	01:59.30	7	Did not advance		
Alvaro Ibarra	400m freestyle	DQF		Did not advance		
Ariel Molina	100m backstroke	59.95	5	59.24	15	
Diego Camacho	100m backstroke	56.04	1	55.38	Gold medal	
Diego Camacho	200m breaststroke	02:04.50	1	02:02.29	Silver medal	
Fernando Ruvalcaba	200m breaststroke	02:06.57	4	02:07.82	8	
Guillermo Cruz	100m breaststroke	01:05.13	4	Did not advance		
Andres Puente	100m breaststroke	01:03.26	1	01:02.29	Silver medal	
Andres Puente	200m breaststroke	02:18.73	1	02:14.85	Gold medal	
Carlos Kossio	200m breaststroke	02:22.70	5	Did not advance		
Alberto Gomez	100m butterfly	55.39	3	55.04	10	
Ascanio Fernandez	100m butterfly	54.76	2	55.08	8	
Ascanio Fernandez	200m butterfly	02:01.57	1	02:03.67	7	
Alberto Gomez	200m individual medley	DQF		Did not advance		
Maximiliano Vega	200m individual medley	02:08.28	3	02:10.36	8	
Maximiliano Vega	400m individual medley	04:36.10	2	04:33.47	4	
Carlos Kossio	400m individual medley	04:40.25	5	04:35.66	6	
Alberto Gomez; Ariel Molina; Diego Camacho; Mariano Jasso; Andres Dupont; Carlos Kossio; Guillermo Cruz	4 × 100 m freestyle relay	03:33.83	2	03:24.02	Silver medal	—
Alvaro Ibarra; Andres Dupont; Diego Camacho; Guillermo Cruz	4 × 200 m freestyle relay			07:41.25	5	—
Andres Dupont; Andres Puente; Ascanio Fernandez; Diego Camacho	4 × 100 m medley relay	03:44.34	2	03:42.67	Gold medal	—

Women's

Athlete	Event	Heats		Final A/B		2023 Pan American Games qualification
Athlete	Event	Result	Rank	Result	Rank	2023 Pan American Games qualification
Tayde Sansores	50m freestyle	26.26	1	25.99	4	
Susana Hernandez	50m freestyle	26.67	2	26.45	7	
Susana Hernandez	100m freestyle	57.73	3	57.66	7	
Athena Meneses	100m freestyle	58.34	4	57.43	9	
Marie Conde	200m freestyle	02:10.16	5	02:10.05	16	
Marie Conde	400m freestyle	04:33.91	7	04:33.99	14	
Regina Caracas	400m freestyle	04:31.89	5	04:31.27	13	
Regina Caracas	1500m freestyle			18:35.93	14	
Maria Sanchez	1500m freestyle			Did Not Start		
Tayde Sansores	100m backstroke	01:03.11	1	01:02.00	Gold medal	
Celia Pulido	100m backstroke	01:03.64	1	01:03.24	Bronze medal	
Celia Pulido	200m backstroke	02:19.04	3	02:18.81	4	
Athena Meneses	200m backstroke	02:17.92	1	02:15.64	Gold medal	
Ilse Alvarez	100m breaststroke	01:14.15	3	01:13.05	8	
Mariana Ortega	100m breaststroke	01:13.14	2	01:12.72	7	
Mariana Ortega	200m breaststroke	02:41.47	4	02:37.10	9	
Ilse Alvarez	200m breaststroke	02:36.65	4	02:37.91	8	
Athena Meneses	100m butterfly	01:01.95	2	01:00.89	4	
Miriam Guevara	100m butterfly	01:02.85	3	01:00.94	6	
Miriam Guevara	200m butterfly	DQF		Did not advance		
Aide Diaz	200m butterfly	02:24.41	7	02:24.25	4	
Athena Meneses	200m individual medley	02:17.99	1	02:21.26	4	
Marie Conde	200m individual medley	02:28.30	5	02:25.80	12	
Marie Conde	400m individual medley	05:06.92	2	05:04.94	6	
Karen Rodriguez	400m individual medley	05:10.72	3	05:12.22	8	
Athena Meneses; Celia Pulido; Susana Hernandez; Tayde Sansores	4 × 100 m freestyle relay			03:49.97	Silver medal	—
Athena Meneses; Celia Pulido; Marie Conde; Susana Hernandez	4 × 200 m freestyle relay			08:29.90	4	—
Athena Meneses; Mariana Ortega; Susana Hernandez; Tayde Sansores	4 × 100 m medley relay			04:15.44	Silver medal	—

Mixed

Athlete	Event	Heats		Final A/B		2023 Pan American Games qualification
Athlete	Event	Result	Rank	Result	Rank	2023 Pan American Games qualification
Andres Dupont; Guillermo Cruz; Susana Hernandez; Tayde Sansores	4 × 100 m freestyle relay	03:37.50	1	03:35.02	Silver medal	—
Andres Puente; Ascanio Fernandez; Ariel Molina; Athena Meneses; Diego Camacho; Mariana Ortega; Susana Hernandez; Tayde Sansores	4 × 100 m medley relay	04:06.98	3	03:56.33	Silver medal	—

== Table Tennis ==
Singles and Doubles

Athlete	Event	Round of 128	Round of 64	Round of 32	Round of 16	Quarterfinal	Semifinal	Final / BM		2023 Pan American Games qualification
Athlete	Event	Opposition Score	Opposition Score	Opposition Score	Opposition Score	Opposition Score	Opposition Score	Opposition Score	Rank	2023 Pan American Games qualification
Juan Gomez	Men's singles	Bye	Naranjo (PUR); L 2 – 4 (11–9),(9–11),(11–6), (9–11),(9–11),(6–11)	Did not advance					33	
Dario Arce	Men's singles	Bye	Montes (COL); W 4 – 1 (11–6),(7–11),(11,6), (11–7),(11–5)	Lorenzo (ARG); L 3 – 4 (11–9),(8–11),(12–10), (11–9),(3–11),(4–11), (9–11)	Did not advance				17	
Juan Gomez; Dario Arce	Men's doubles				Cuba; L 1 – 4 (11–6),(9–11),(8–11), (11–9),(5–11)	Did not advance			9	—
Clio Barcenas	Women's singles		Bye	Suárez (ESA); W 4 – 1 (11–7),(11–6),(10–12), (11–2),(11–6)	Watanabe (BRA); L 1 – 4 (8–11),(12–10),(8–11), (2–11),(2–11)	Did not advance			9	
Arantxa Cossio	Women's singles		Bye	Diaz (CRC); W 4 – 0 (11–8),(11–6),(11–7), (11–3)	Paredes (ECU); W 4 – 2 (11–9),(9–11),(9–11), (11–6),(11–4),(11–7)	Burgos (PUR); W 4 – 0 (11–5),(12–10),(11–8), (11–5)	Takahashi (BRA); W 4 – 1 (10–12),(11–8),(11–9), (11–6),(11–9)	Fonseca (CUB); L 4 – 0 (9–11),(5–11),(9–11), (8–11)	Silver medal	
Clio Barcenas; Arantxa Cossio	Women's doubles				Argentina; W 3 – 0 (11–7),(11–5),(11–4)	El Salvador; W 3 – 0 (11–5),(15–13),(11–7)	United States; W 3 – 1 (11–6),(11–9),(4–11), (11–9)	Brazil; W 3 – 2 (6–11),(11–3),(11–7), (6–11),(11–7)	Gold medal	—
Juan Gomez; Arantxa Cossio	Mixed doubles				Chile; W 3 – 0 (11–8),(11–8),(11–6)	El Salvador; W 3 – 0 (11–7),(15–8),(11–5)	Canada; W 3 – 2 (9–11),(11–7),(4–11), (11–4),(11–4)	Brazil; L 2 – 3 (11–6),(12–10),(5–11), (8–11),(7–11)	Silver medal	—

Team

Athlete	Event	Pool Play			Quarterfinal	Semifinal	Final / BM		2023 Pan American Games qualification
Athlete	Event	Opposition Score	Opposition Score	Rank	Opposition Score	Opposition Score	Opposition Score	Rank	2023 Pan American Games qualification
Juan Gomez; Dario Arce	Men's Team	Brazil; L 1 – 3 (19–33),(49–44),(38–43), (32–41)	Guatemala; W 3 – 0 (33–14),(33–12),(33–17)	2	Chile; L 3 – 0 (8–11),(8–11),(6–11)	Did not advance		5	—
Clio Barcenas; Arantxa Cossio	Women's team	Chile; W 3 – 0 (39–31),(46–37),(48–41)	Paraguay; W 3 – 0 (49–36),(42–34),(51–38)	1	El Salvador; W 3 – 0 (37–27),(33–16),(42–24)	Puerto Rico; W 3 – 2 (42–34),(44–48),(39–41), (46–39),(48–47)	Brazil; L 1 – 3 (50–53),(34–38),(41–35), (16–33)	Silver medal	—

== Taekwondo ==
Athlete	Event	Round of 16	Quarterfinal	Semifinal	Final / BM		2023 Pan American Games qualification
Athlete	Event	Opposition Score	Opposition Score	Opposition Score	Opposition Score	Rank	2023 Pan American Games qualification
Uriel Gomez	Men's -68 kg	Montufar (GUA); W 3(1) – 3	Martinez (DOM); W 26 – 14	Benitez (PUR); W 19 – 6	Olivero (CHI); W 7 – 0	Gold medal	
Juan Pablo Esquivel	Men's +80 kg		Martinez (HON); W 30 – 10	Pereira (BRA); W 14 – 13	Parker (USA); L 0 – 2	Silver medal	
Angie Venegas	Women's -49 kg	Bye	Victor (DOM); W 23 – 6	Saldaña (COL); W 27 – 18	Calderón (CRC); W 12 – 10	Gold medal	
Leslie Soltero	Women's -67 kg		Bye	Lojudice (BRA); W 16 – 0	Vasquez (PER); W 25 – 2	Gold medal	
Paulina Garnica	Women's +67 kg		Bye	Evolo (ARG); L 11 –19	Aguiar (CUB); W 39 – 20	Bronze medal	

== Tennis ==
Athlete	Event	Round of 64	Round of 32	Round of 16	Round of 8	Quarterfinal	Semifinal	Final / BM		2023 Pan American Games qualification
Athlete	Event	Opposition Score	Opposition Score	Opposition Score	Opposition Score	Opposition Score	Opposition Score	Opposition Score	Rank	2023 Pan American Games qualification
Edson Sanchez	Men's singles	Bye	Phillips (BER); W 7-5, 6-3	Prado (BOL); L 3–6, 5–7	Did not advance				17	
Emiliano Aguilera	Men's singles	Bye	Cuellar (BOL); W 7-6, 6-4	Midon (ARG); L 6–7, 3–6	Did not advance				17	
Edson Sanchez; Emiliano Aguilera	Men's doubles				Bolivia; L 3–6, 7–5, 7–10	Did not advance			9	—
María Martínez	Women's singles	Bye	Rondon (COL); W 6-3, 6-2	Chiatti (DOM); W 6-2, 6-1	Britez (PAR); L 2–6, 2–6	Did not advance			9	
Julia Garcia	Women's singles	Bye		Zamburek (DOM); W 6-4, 0–6, 6-3	Hayashida (PER); L 4–6, 5–7	Did not advance			9	
María Martínez; Julia Garcia	Women's doubles				Bye	Guatemala; W 6-4, 6-1	Paraguay; W 6-4, 6-3	Peru; L 6–7, 5–7	Silver medal	—
Emiliano Aguilera; Julia Garcia	Mixed doubles				Bolivia; W 6-3, 6-2	Guatemala; W 7–5, 7–5	Argentina; L 3–6, 3–6	Venezuela; W 6-0, 6-3	Bronze medal	—

== Triathlon ==
Athlete	Event	Swim	T1	Bike	T2	Run	Total Time	Final rank	2023 Pan American Games qualification
Eduardo Nuñez	Men's individual	0:09:07	0:01:32	0:29:08	0:00:33	0:16:39	00:57:01	Silver medal	
Erik Ramos	Men's individual	0:09:30	0:01:36	0:29:29	0:00:31	0:17:06	00:58:14	7	
Anahí Alvarez	Women's individual	0:11:03	0:01:35	0:33:19	0:00:33	0:17:28	1:03:59	Gold medal	
Mercedes Romero	Women's individual	0:09:58	0:01:42	0:33:21	0:00:38	0:19:14	1:04:55	Silver medal	
Eduardo Nuñez; Erik Ramos; Anahí Alvarez; Mercedes Romero	Mixed Relay	16:18.00	06:00.00	40:17.00	02:01.00	19:12.00	1:23:48.971	Silver medal	—

== Volleyball ==
=== Men's ===
Summary

Team	Event	Group play				Semifinal	Final / BM		2023 Pan American Games qualification
Team	Event	Opposition Result	Opposition Result	Opposition Result	Rank	Opposition Result	Opposition Result	Rank	2023 Pan American Games qualification
Mexico	Men's tournament	Chile; W 3 – 0; 25-22, 25–20. 25–17	Dominican Republic; W 3 – 2; 25-19, 25–18, 23–25, 18-25, 16–14	Brazil; L 2 – 3; 25-19, 15–25, 23–25, 25-23, 7–15	2	Argentina; W 3 – 2; 21-25, 26–24, 22–25, 25-23, 17–15	Brazil; L 0 – 3; 17-25, 21–25,20-25	Silver medal	

Squad

Mexico
No.	Player	Birthdate	Weight	Height	Spike	Block	Pos
1	Hiram Bravo	19-Dec-1999	75	173	234	226	L
5	Jonathan Cabrera	26-Jul-1999	68	173	314	310	S
6	Josue Lopez Rios	21-Jul-2002	91	197	360	330	OH
7	Diego Gonzalez (C)	15-Feb-2000	85	201	365	350	OP
9	Axel Tellez Rodriguez	8-Oct-1999	99	203	350	345	MB
10	Yasutaka Sanay	2-May-2001	85	186	345	315	OH
11	Jorge Sandoval	6-Jun-2001	92	198	340	311	MB
12	Edgar Mendoza	8-Jan-1999	94	197	338	326	S
13	Aldo Zambrano	9-Jun-2001	85	190	330	315	OH
17	Victor Manuel Parra	3-Sep-1999	97	201	348	325	MB
18	Oziel Aguirre	20-Ago-2002	71	184	340	320	OH
19	Luis Hernadez	4-Jan-2001	82	200	357	327	OP
Head Coach: Asst. Coach: Physiotherapist: Statistician: Team Manager:		Jorge Miguel Azair; Jose Luis Martell; Gerardo Adrian Salazar; Jorge Alberto Romero; Jorge Alberto Romero					

Group play

26 November 2021; 14:30 (UTC−5)	Mexico	3 – 0	Chile	Coliseo Evangelista Mora; Attendance: 100; Referees: Ricardo Borroto Iglesias (CUB), Jaime Mauricio Villafañe Arnedo (COL)
26 November 2021; 14:30 (UTC−5)	(25–22, 25–20, 25–17)			Coliseo Evangelista Mora; Attendance: 100; Referees: Ricardo Borroto Iglesias (CUB), Jaime Mauricio Villafañe Arnedo (COL)

27 November 2021; 14:30 (UTC−5)	Mexico	3 – 2	Dominican Republic	Coliseo Evangelista Mora; Attendance: 400; Referees: Walda Ioanna Maldonado Lam (GUA), Jose Luis Vasquez Portocarrero (PER)
27 November 2021; 14:30 (UTC−5)	(25–19, 25–18, 23–25, 18–25, 16–14)			Coliseo Evangelista Mora; Attendance: 400; Referees: Walda Ioanna Maldonado Lam (GUA), Jose Luis Vasquez Portocarrero (PER)

28 November 2021; 14:30 (UTC−5)	Mexico	2 – 3	Brazil	Coliseo Evangelista Mora; Attendance: 400; Referees: Jaime Mauricio Villafañe Arnedo (COL), Víctor Bagala (ARG)
28 November 2021; 14:30 (UTC−5)	(25–19, 15–25, 23–25, 25–23, 7–15)			Coliseo Evangelista Mora; Attendance: 400; Referees: Jaime Mauricio Villafañe Arnedo (COL), Víctor Bagala (ARG)

Semifinals

29 November 2021; 20:30 (UTC−5)	Argentina	2 – 3	Mexico	Coliseo Evangelista Mora; Attendance: 700; Referees: Andreza Nogueira Misquita (BRA), Ricardo Borroto Iglesias (CUB)
29 November 2021; 20:30 (UTC−5)	(21–25, 26–24, 22–25, 25–23, 17–15)			Coliseo Evangelista Mora; Attendance: 700; Referees: Andreza Nogueira Misquita (BRA), Ricardo Borroto Iglesias (CUB)

Gold Medal Match

30 November 2021; 19:30 (UTC−5)	Mexico	0 – 3	Brazil	Coliseo Evangelista Mora; Attendance: 400; Referees: Walda Ioanna Maldonado Lam (GUA), Denis Fabián Carbajal Mozzo (URU)
30 November 2021; 19:30 (UTC−5)	(17–25, 21–25, 20–25)			Coliseo Evangelista Mora; Attendance: 400; Referees: Walda Ioanna Maldonado Lam (GUA), Denis Fabián Carbajal Mozzo (URU)

Individual awards

No.	Player	Award
17	Victor Manuel Parra	2nd Best Blocker
7	Diego Gonzalez (C)	Best Opposite

=== Women's ===
Summary

Team	Event	Group play				5–8th Place Semifinals	5–8th Place Final		2023 Pan American Games qualification
Team	Event	Opposition Result	Opposition Result	Opposition Result	Rank	Opposition Result	Opposition Result	Rank	2023 Pan American Games qualification
Mexico	Women's tournament	Argentina; L 2 – 3; 25-22, 24–26, 14–25, 25-11, 14–16	Suriname; W 3 – 0; 25-9, 25–5, 25–12	Colombia; L 2 – 3; 20-25, 22–25, 25–22, 25-22, 7–15	3	Bye	Dominican Republic; L 0 – 3; 22-25, 19–25, 20–25	6	

Squad

Mexico
No.	Player	Birthdate	Weight	Height	Spike	Block	Pos
1	Christian Alvarez	19-Apr-1999	74	180	300	293	MB
2	Renata Lopez	15-Feb-2001	74	185	291	283	MB
3	Cindy Garcia	1-Dec-2001	80	181	280	265	MB
4	Daniela Bernal	3-May-2000	73	180	262	254	S
5	Karen Rivera	22-May-1999	62	174	265	260	S
6	Grecia Castro (C)	05-Mar-2001	75	180	255	241	OH
8	Marian Ovalle	14-Sep-2002	66	178	292	294	OP
10	Daniela Siller	25-Mar-2000	58	175	258	249	OH
11	Angela Muñoz	10-Nov-2000	62	178	260	247	OH
12	Joseline Landeros	20-Dec-2000	60	169	265	249	L
15	Pamela Durazo	23-Nov-2002	65	180	260	250	MB
22	Andrea Elicerio	22-Jan-2002	84	181	260	245	MB
Head Coach: Asst. Coach: Physiotherapist:		Luis Alberto Leon; Juan Carlos Castro; Jesús Armando Salazar					

Group play

1 December 2021; 18:00 (UTC−5)	Mexico	2 – 3	Argentina	Coliseo Evangelista Mora; Attendance: 1,000; Referees: Anthony Gomez Barrera (CHI), Patrick Bernard Basso (BRA)
1 December 2021; 18:00 (UTC−5)	(25-22, 24-26, 14-25, 25-11, 14-16)			Coliseo Evangelista Mora; Attendance: 1,000; Referees: Anthony Gomez Barrera (CHI), Patrick Bernard Basso (BRA)

2 December 2021; 18:00 (UTC−5)	Mexico	3 – 0	Suriname	Coliseo Evangelista Mora; Attendance: 500; Referees: Gerardo Martín Cifuentes Alvarado (GUA), Andreza Nogueira Misquita (BRA)
2 December 2021; 18:00 (UTC−5)	(25-9, 25-5, 25-12)			Coliseo Evangelista Mora; Attendance: 500; Referees: Gerardo Martín Cifuentes Alvarado (GUA), Andreza Nogueira Misquita (BRA)

3 December 2021; 20:30 (UTC−5)	Colombia	3 – 2	Mexico	Coliseo Evangelista Mora; Attendance: 2,000; Referees: Walda Ioanna Maldonado Lam (GUA), Andreza Nogueira Misquita (BRA)
3 December 2021; 20:30 (UTC−5)	(20-25, 22-25, 25-22, 25-22, 7-15)			Coliseo Evangelista Mora; Attendance: 2,000; Referees: Walda Ioanna Maldonado Lam (GUA), Andreza Nogueira Misquita (BRA)

5–8th Place Final

4 December 2021; 12:30 (UTC−5)	Mexico	0 – 3	Dominican Republic	Coliseo Evangelista Mora; Attendance: 150; Referees: Andreza Nogueira Misquita (BRA), Víctor Bagala (ARG)
4 December 2021; 12:30 (UTC−5)	(22-25, 19-25, 20-25)			Coliseo Evangelista Mora; Attendance: 150; Referees: Andreza Nogueira Misquita (BRA), Víctor Bagala (ARG)

Individual awards

No.	Player	Award
6	Grecia Castro (C)	Best Server

== Weightlifting ==
Athlete	Event	Snatch		Clean & Jerk		Total		2023 Pan American Games qualification
Athlete	Event	Result	Rank	Result	Rank	Result	Rank	2023 Pan American Games qualification
Herseleid Carrazco	Men's -61 kg	110 kg	5	130 kg	5	240 kg	5	
Mauricio Canul	Men's -81 kg	145 kg	2	178 kg	2	323 kg	Silver medal	
Jonathan Ramos	Men's -96 kg	143 kg	5	187 kg	2	330 kg	Silver medal	
Antonio Govea	Men's -109 kg	155 kg	2	184 kg	3	339 kg	Silver medal	
Jorge Hernandez	Men's +109 kg	148 kg	5	186 kg	4	334 kg	4	
Yesica Hernandez	Women's -49 kg	81 kg	2	100 kg	2	181 kg	Silver medal	
Irene Borrego	Women's -55 kg	85 kg	1	106 kg	2	191 kg	Silver medal	
Queysi Rojas	Women's -64 kg	98 kg	2	117 kg	2	215 kg	Silver medal	
Angela Gutierrez	Women's -87 kg	100 kg	2	121 kg	4	221 kg	4	
Noemi Rodriguez	Women's +87 kg	108 kg	1	138 kg	1	246 kg	Gold medal	

== Wrestling ==
Athlete	Event	Round of 16	Quarterfinal	Semifinal	Final / BM		2023 Pan American Games qualification
Athlete	Event	Opposition Score	Opposition Score	Opposition Score	Opposition Score	Rank	2023 Pan American Games qualification
Erick Barroso	Men's Freestyle -57 kg	Bye	García (PAN); W 11 – 3	Herrera (PER); L 1 – 3	Morales (ECU); W 3 – 1	Bronze medal	
Hector Gonzalez	Men's Freestyle -65 kg	Bye	González (COL); W 7 – 2	Lovera (ARG); W 13 – 2	Chittum (USA); L 0 – 11	Silver medal	
Diego Sandoval	Men's Freestyle -74 kg		Olavarria (PUR); L 1 – 3	Did not advance		7	
Juan Lazaro	Men's Freestyle -86 kg		Iturriza (COL); W 8 – 2	Imbernon (BRA); W 14 – 4	Wolf (USA); L 1 – 12	Silver medal	
Josue Campos	Men's Freestyle -97 kg		Angulo (COL); W 10 – 7	Casale (USA); L 0 – 4	Ijeoma (BAH); W 8 – 0	Bronze medal	
Luis Orozco	Men's Freestyle -125 kg		Araujo (VEN); W 12 – 1	Torres (ESA); W 10 – 0	Cover (USA); L 0 – 10	Silver medal	
Uvaldo Camacho	Men's Greco-Roman -60 kg		Allain (PER); W 3 – 2	Rodriguez (VEN); L 3(1) – 3(3)	Moomey (USA); L 6 – 2	5	
Hector Sanchez	Men's Greco-Roman -67 kg		Fuentes (GUA); L 1(1) – 1(3)	Did not advance	Ferrer (DOM); L 1 – 9	5	
Diego Macias	Men's Greco-Roman -77 kg		Chialanza (ARG); W 5 – 2	Cubas (PER); L 0 – 9	Reyes (DOM); W 8 – 0	Bronze medal	
Pedro Bello	Men's Greco-Roman -87 kg		Alzaga (PUR); W 11 – 2	Stephens (USA); L 0 – 41	Fuentes (ECU); W 8 – 0	Bronze medal	
Daniel Veliz	Men's Greco-Roman -97 kg		Sarmiento (VEN); W 2(3) – 2(1)	Betancourt (CUB); L 0 – 8	Dubose (USA); W 5 – 0 VFO	Bronze medal	
Beder Cantu	Men's Greco-Roman -130 kg		Morales (COL); W 6 – 3	Cantillo (PAN); W 9 – 0	Sampson (CUB); L 0 – 8	Silver medal	
Zeltzin Hernandez	Women's Freestyle -53 kg		Ortega (CHI); W 10 – 0	Romero (COL); W 13 – 2	Herin (CUB); L 6 – 11	Silver medal	
Paulina Romero	Women's Freestyle -57 kg		Hernández (ESA); W 5 – 0	Hurtado (COL); L 6 – 14	Valdez (CHI); W 2 – 0	Bronze medal	
Alejandra Rivera	Women's Freestyle -62 kg		Cordero (CUB); L 0 – 5	Did not advance	Yates (USA); L 7 – 8	5	
Sandra Escamilla	Women's Freestyle -68 kg		Raeleen (CAN); W 5 – 2	Segura (DOM); W 5 – 1	Parrado (COL); L 4 – 8	Silver medal	
Gabriela Canales	Women's Freestyle -76 kg		Welker (USA); L 0– 8	Did not advance		7	
