= Canoeing at the 2021 Junior Pan American Games =

- Canoeing pictogram
- Venue: Calima Lake
- Dates: November 25–27
- Competitors: 93 from 15 nations

Canoeing competitions at the 2021 Junior Pan American Games in Cali, Colombia, were held at the Calima Lake located in the municipality of Calima, Valle del Cauca.

12 medal events are scheduled to be contested, all in sprint (six per gender).

== Medal table ==
* Host nation (Colombia)

Rank	Nation	Gold	Silver	Bronze	Total
1	Argentina	5	1	2	8
2	Mexico	2	5	5	12
3	Chile	2	4	3	9
4	Cuba	2	1	0	3
5	Brazil	1	0	1	2
6	Uruguay	0	1	0	1
7	Colombia*	0	0	1	1
Totals (7 entries)		12	12	12	36

== Medallists ==
=== Sprint ===
Men

Event	Gold	Silver	Bronze
Men's C-1 1000 m	José Pelier Cordova; Cuba	Gustavo Eslava Rosas; Mexico	Filipe Vinícius Vieira; Brazil
Men's C-2 1000 m	Brazil; Diego Do Nascimento; Evandilson Avelar Neto	Mexico; Jose Gil Rodriguez; Miguel Figueroa Vargas	Chile; Joaquin Cataldo Mendez; Michael Martinez Sobarzo
Men's K-1 200 m	Jose Eguia Alcazar; Mexico	Luis Melo Duarte; Uruguay	Gonzalo Lo Moro Benassi; Argentina
Men's K-1 1000 m	Valentin Rossi; Argentina	Reinier Monteagudo; Cuba	Juan Pablo Rodríguez Ovando; Mexico
Men's K-2 1000 m	Argentina; Pedro Ratto; Valentin Rossi	Chile; Julian Cartes Guzman; Marcelo Godoy Borman	Mexico; Juan Pablo Ovando; Oscar Reyes García
Men's K-4 500 m	Argentina; Bautista Itria; Gonzalo Lo Moro Benassi; Pedro Ratto; Valentin Rossi	Mexico; Jose Feliz Campa; Jose Eguia Alcazar; Juan Pablo Ovando; Oscar Reyes García	Chile; Julian Cartes Guzman; Marcelo Godoy Borman; Mario Valencia Aguilera; Matias Nuñez Garrido

Women

Event	Gold	Silver	Bronze
Women's C-1 200 m	Katherin Nuevo Segura; Cuba	Barbara Jara Muñoz; Chile	Stephanie Rodríguez Guzmán; Mexico
Women's C-2 500 m	Chile; Barbara Jara Muñoz; Paula Gomez Morales	Mexico; Ada González Ibarra; Stephanie Rodríguez Guzmán	Colombia; Madison Velásquez; Manuela Gómez
Women's K-1 200 m	Constanza Gasparoni; Argentina	Fernanda Iracheta Gozalez; Chile	Isabel Aburto Romero; Mexico
Women's K-1 500 m	Isabel Aburto; Mexico	Daniela Castillo Acuña; Chile	Candelaria Sequeira; Argentina
Women's K-2 500 m	Chile; Daniela Castillo Acuña; Fernanda Iracheta González	Argentina; Candelaria Sequeira; Rebeca D'Estefano	Mexico; Isabel Aburto; Karen Berrelleza
Women's K-4 500 m	Argentina; Candelaria Sequeira; Constanza Gasparoni; Paulina Contini; Rebeca D'Estefano	Mexico; Ailyn González; Isabel Aburto; Karen Berrelleza; Laira Moreno	Chile; Daniela Castillo Acuña; Fernanda Iracheta González; Javiera Iracheta González; Renata Duran Muñoz
