= Triathlon at the 2021 Junior Pan American Games =

- Triathlon pictogram
- Venue: Calima Lake
- Dates: November 26 and 28
- Competitors: 62 from 21 nations

Triathlon competitions at the 2021 Junior Pan American Games in Cali, Colombia, were held at the Calima Lake located in the municipality of Calima, Valle del Cauca.

3 medal events were contested.

== Medal table ==
* Host nation (Colombia)

Rank	Nation	Gold	Silver	Bronze	Total
1	Mexico	1	3	0	4
2	Ecuador	1	0	2	3
3	Brazil	1	0	0	1
4	United States	0	0	1	1
Totals (4 entries)		3	3	3	9

== Medallists ==
Event	Gold		Silver		Bronze	
Boys	Miguel Hidalgo; Brazil	56:40	Eduardo Nuñez; Mexico	57:01	Cesar Criollo; Ecuador	57:08
Girls	Anahí Alvarez; Mexico	1:03:59	Mercedes Romero; Mexico	1:04:55	Paula Vega Campoverde; Ecuador	1:05:56
Mixed Relay	Ecuador; Nancy Lojano; Gabriel Terán Carvajal; Paula Vega; Cesar Criollo	1:23:48	Mexico; Mercedes Romero; Eduardo Nuñez; Anahi Alvarez; Erik Yamir Ramos	1:23:48	United States; Liberty Ricca; Andrew Shellenberger; Madisen Lavin; Nicholas Holmes	1:24:18
