= Rowing at the 2021 Junior Pan American Games =

- Rowing pictogram
- Venue: Calima Lake
- Dates: 1–4 December
- Competitors: 98 from 17 nations

Rowing competitions at the 2021 Junior Pan American Games in Cali, Colombia were held from 1 to 4 December 2021.

== Medal summary ==
=== Medal table ===
* Host nation (Colombia)

Rank	Nation	Gold	Silver	Bronze	Total
1	Uruguay	6	1	2	9
2	Paraguay	2	1	1	4
3	Mexico	1	6	1	8
4	Chile	1	0	1	2
5	Peru	0	1	2	3
6	Brazil	0	1	0	1
7	Colombia*	0	0	1	1
7	Cuba	0	0	1	1
7	Ecuador	0	0	1	1
Totals (9 entries)		10	10	10	30

== Medalists ==
=== Men's ===
Event	Gold	Silver	Bronze
Single skiff	Javier Insfran; Paraguay	Tomas Garcia Levy; Brazil	Carlos Ajete Jauregui; Cuba
Double skiff	Uruguay; Felipe Klüver; Luciano Garcia Morales	Mexico; Hugo Reyes; Jordy Gutierrez	Peru; Angel Sosa Acevedo; Cesar Enrique Cipriani
Quadruple skiff	Uruguay; Felipe Klüver; Leandro Rodas; Martin Zocalo; Newton Seawright Conde	Mexico; Adolfo Peralta; Hugo Reyes; Jordy Gutierrez; Tomas Manzanillo	Peru; Andres Sandoval; Angel Sosa Acevedo; Cesar Enrique Cirpiani; Sandro Gardella
Coxless pair	Uruguay; Leandro Rodas; Martin Zocalo	Mexico; Gabriel Manuel Díaz; Julio López Puentes	Paraguay; Daniel Villalba Acuña; Nicolas Villalba Acuña
Coxless Four	Uruguay; Felipe Klüver; Leandro Rodas; Martin Zocalo; Newton Seawright Conde	Paraguay; Daniel Villalba Acuña; Gustavo Avalos; Ivan Estigarribia; Nicolas Villalba Acuña	Mexico; Emilio Garcia Rodríguez; Gabriel Manuel Díaz; Julio López Puentes; Luis Fernando García

=== Women's ===
Event	Gold	Silver	Bronze
Single skiff	Nicole Martinez Gonzalez; Paraguay	Francesca Gardella; Peru	Tatiana Seijas; Uruguay
Double skiff	Mexico; Aylin Ibarra; Mildred Mercado	Uruguay; Cloe Callorda; Ynela Aires	Colombia; Erika Piñeda; Zulay Gil
Quadruple skiff	Uruguay; Cloe Callorda; Romina Cetraro; Tatiana Seijas; Zoe Acosta	Mexico; Aylin Ibarra; Mildred Mercado; Monica García; Ximena Castellanos	Ecuador; Domenique Murrieta; Helen González; Iulia Solano; Kerly Salazar
Coxless pair	Uruguay; Yuliana Etchebarne; Zoe Acosta	Mexico; Devanih Plata; Lilian Armenta	Chile; Antonia Liewald Heise; Isidora Niemeyer
Coxless Four	Chile; Antonia Liewald Heise; Gabriela Bahamonde Santibañez; Isidora Niemeyer; Magdalena Rojas	Mexico; Devanih Plata; Lilian Armenta; Maria Sheccid García; Mildred Mercado	Uruguay; Paulina Centurion López; Valeria Olivera Vique; Yuliana Etcherbarne; Zoe Acosta
