= Modern pentathlon at the 2023 Pan American Games – Qualification =

The following is the qualification system and qualified countries for the Modern pentathlon at the 2023 Pan American Games competitions.

== Qualification system ==
A total of 66 Modern pentathletes will qualify to compete. Each nation may enter a maximum of 6 athletes (three per gender), except for the winners of the individual events at the 2021 Junior Pan American Games. Quotas will be awarded across two qualification tournaments. The host nation, Chile, automatically qualifies four athletes (two per gender). Two quotas (one per gender) will be distributed via the 2021 Junior Pan American Games. The remaining quotas will be awarded per during the 2022 Pan American Championships, with a minimum of one and up to three athletes per gender per country.

== Qualification timeline ==
Event	Date	Venue
2021 Junior Pan American Games	December 2–5, 2021	(Colombia) Cali
2022 Pan American Championships	October 19–23, 2022	(Brazil) Resende

== Qualification summary ==
The following is the final allocation quota.

Nation	Men		Women		Mixed	Total
Nation	Individual	Relay	Individual	Relay	Relay	Athletes
Argentina	3	X	3	X	X	6
Bolivia	2	X	2	X	X	4
Brazil	3	X	3	X	X	6
Canada	2	X	3	X	X	5
Chile	2	X	2	X	X	4
Cuba	3	X	2	X	X	5
Dominican Republic	2	X	2	X	X	4
Ecuador	3	X	3	X	X	6
Guatemala	3	X	3	X	X	6
Mexico	3	X	4	X	X	7
Peru	2	X	1		X	3
United States	2	X	3	X	X	5
Uruguay	1		1		X	2
Venezuela	2	X	1	X	X	3
Total: 14 NOCs	33		33			66

== Men ==
Competition	Vacancies	Qualified
Host nation	2	Chile; Chile
2021 Junior Pan American Games	1	Andrés Torres Robles (ECU)
2022 Pan American Championships	~~14~~ 13	Mexico; Argentina; Brazil; Cuba; Venezuela; Guatemala; United States; Dominican Republic; Canada; Ecuador; Peru; Bolivia; ~~Colombia~~; Uruguay
2022 Pan American Championships; Second ranked	12	Mexico; Argentina; Cuba; Brazil; Guatemala; United States; Venezuela; Ecuador; Canada; Dominican Republic; Peru; Bolivia
2022 Pan American Championships; Third ranked	~~4~~ 5	Mexico; Brazil; Argentina; Cuba; Guatemala
Total	33	

== Women ==
Competition	Vacancies	Qualified
Host nation	2	Chile; Chile
2021 Junior Pan American Games	1	Catherine Oliver (MEX)
2022 Pan American Championships	~~14~~13	Mexico; Brazil; Guatemala; Argentina; United States; Ecuador; Cuba; Canada; Venezuela; Dominican Republic; Uruguay; Bolivia; ~~Colombia~~; Peru
2022 Pan American Championships; Second ranked	10	Brazil; Mexico; Argentina; Guatemala; United States; Ecuador; Canada; Cuba; Dominican Republic; Bolivia
2022 Pan American Championships; Third ranked	~~6~~ 7	Brazil; Guatemala; Mexico; United States; Ecuador; Argentina; Canada
Total	33	
