= Bowling at the 2021 Junior Pan American Games =

- Bowling pictogram
- Venue: Bowling Arena
- Dates: 28–30 November
- Competitors: 32 from 17 nations

Bowling competitions at the 2021 Junior Pan American Games in Cali, Colombia, were scheduled to be held from November 28 to 30, 2021.

== Medal summary ==
=== Medal table ===
* Host nation (Colombia)

Rank	Nation	Gold	Silver	Bronze	Total
1	Puerto Rico	3	0	1	4
2	Colombia*	1	1	2	4
3	Costa Rica	0	3	1	4
4	Guatemala	0	0	1	1
4	Mexico	0	0	1	1
4	Peru	0	0	1	1
Totals (6 entries)		4	4	7	15

== Medalists ==
Event	Gold	Silver	Bronze
Men's singles	Edgar Burgos Quiñones; Puerto Rico	Jonaykel Conejo; Costa Rica	Frank Pablo de la Sotta; Peru
Men's singles	Edgar Burgos Quiñones; Puerto Rico	Jonaykel Conejo; Costa Rica	Felipe Gil; Colombia
Men's doubles	Colombia; Felipe Gil; José Mora	Costa Rica; Janaykel Conejo; Mateo Johanning	Guatemala; Diego Fernando Aguilar; Marvin Leon Urbina
Men's doubles	Colombia; Felipe Gil; José Mora	Costa Rica; Janaykel Conejo; Mateo Johanning	Puerto Rico; Edgar Burgos Quiñones; Jorge Rodríguez
Women's singles	Taishaye Quiara; Puerto Rico	Sara Duque; Colombia	Ericka Quesada Gomis; Costa Rica
Women's singles	Taishaye Quiara; Puerto Rico	Sara Duque; Colombia	Andrea Carolina Pérez; Mexico
Women's doubles	Puerto Rico; Pamela Pérez Millán; Taishaye Quiara	Costa Rica; Ericka Quesada Gomis; Fabiola Sandoval Atan	Colombia; Catalina Gómez; Sara Duque
