= Paraguay at the 2021 Junior Pan American Games =

- IOC code: PAR
- NOC: Paraguayan Olympic Committee

in Cali–Valle del Cauca, Colombia
- Competitors: 69 in 18 sports
- Flag bearers (opening): Luana Alonso and Ángel Gini
- Flag bearers (closing): Javier Insfran and Montserrat Viveros
- Medals Ranked 15th: Gold 2 Silver 4 Bronze 4 Total 10

Junior Pan American Games appearances (overview)
- 2021; 2025

Paraguay competed in the 2021 Junior Pan American Games in Cali–Valle, Colombia from 25 November to 5 December 2021.

Flag bearers at the opening ceremony were swimmer Luana Alonso and judoka Ángel Gini. At the closing ceremony flag bearers were gold medal-winning rower Javier Insfran and bronze medal-winning fencer Montserrat Viveros.

== Medals by sport ==
Sport	Gold	Silver	Bronze	Total
Rowing	2	1	1	4
Swimming	0	1	1	2
Tennis	0	1	1	2
Handball	0	1	0	1
Fencing	0	0	1	1
Totals (5 entries)	2	4	4	10

== Medallists ==
Medal	Name	Sport	Event	Date
Gold	Javier Insfrán	Rowing	Single skiff	December 2
Gold	Nicole Martínez González	Rowing	Single skiff	December 4
Silver	Luana Alonso	Swimming	200 m individual medley	November 27
Silver	Ana Yamile Oliveira Cabrera; Fátima Acuña; Fátima Ocampos; Fiorella Olmedo Aranda; Gabriela Benítez Almada; Jazmín Samaniego Benitez; Jazmín Mendoza; Julieta Anahí Chilavert Moreno; Kiara Vergara Martínez; Liliana Acuña; Maggie Lugo Lara; María Paula Fernández; Shelsea Maria Belén Careaga; Sofía Villalba	Handball	Women's tournament	November 28
Silver	Daniel Villalba Acuña; Gustavo Ávalos; Iván Estigarribia; Nicolás Villalba Acuña	Rowing	Coxless four	December 3
Silver	Leyla Britez	Tennis	Women's individual	December 4
Bronze	Matheo Mateos	Swimming	100 m butterfly	November 30
Bronze	Daniel Villalba Acuña; Nicolás Villalba Acuña	Rowing	Coxless pair	December 1
Bronze	Daniel Vallejo; Martin Vergara	Tennis	Men's doubles	December 3
Bronze	Gabriela Mendoza	Fencing	Women's épée	December 4

== See also ==
- Paraguay at the Junior Pan American Games
