= Shooting at the 2021 Junior Pan American Games =

- Shooting pictogram
- Venue: Club Deportivo Bernardo Tobar
- Dates: 26–28 November
- Competitors: 66 from 15 nations

Shooting competitions at the 2021 Junior Pan American Games in Cali, Colombia were held from 26 to 28 November 2021.

== Medal summary ==
=== Medal table ===
* Host nation (Colombia)

| Rank | Nation | Gold | Silver | Bronze | Total |
|---|---|---|---|---|---|
| 1 | United States | 5 | 2 | 2 | 9 |
| 2 | Mexico | 1 | 3 | 1 | 5 |
| 3 | Brazil | 0 | 1 | 1 | 2 |
| 4 | Chile | 0 | 0 | 2 | 2 |
| Totals (4 entries) | | 6 | 6 | 6 | 18 |

== Medalists ==
| Event | Gold | Silver | Bronze |
|---|---|---|---|
| Men's 10 metres air pistol | Ricardo Valencia; Mexico | Caio de Almeida; Brazil | Remington Smith; United States |
| Men's 10 metre air rifle | Rylan Kissell; United States | John Blanton III; United States | Daniel Vidal Molina; Chile |
| Women's 10 metre air pistol | Suman Sanghera; United States | Katelyn Abeln; United States | Andre Ibarra; Mexico |
| Women's 10 metre air rifle | Mary Tucker; United States | Elizabeth Nieves; Mexico | Katie Zaun; United States |
| Mixed team 10 metre air pistol | United States; Katelyn Abeln; Remington Smith | Mexico; Andrea Ibarra; Ricardo Valencia | Brazil; Caio de Almeida; Sara da Rosa |
| Mixed team 10 metre air rifle | United States; Mary Tucker; Rylan Kissell | Mexico; Carlos Quintero; Elizabeth Nieves | Chile; Allison Aguilera Sánchez; Cristobal Robles Morales |
