= 3x3 basketball at the 2021 Junior Pan American Games =

- Basketball pictogram
- Venue: Pan American Courts
- Dates: 28–30 November 2021
- Competitors: 96 from 16 nations
- Teams: 24

3x3 basketball competitions at the 2021 Junior Pan American Games in Cali, Colombia will take place November 28–30, 2021.

== Medal table ==
* Host nation (Colombia)

Rank	Nation	Gold	Silver	Bronze	Total
1	Chile	1	0	1	2
2	Colombia*	1	0	0	1
2	Puerto Rico	1	0	0	1
4	Argentina	0	1	1	2
5	Dominican Republic	0	1	0	1
5	Venezuela	0	1	0	1
7	Mexico	0	0	1	1
Totals (7 entries)		3	3	3	9

== Medalists ==
Event	Gold	Silver	Bronze
Men's	Puerto Rico; Adrian Ocasio Negron; Leandro Luis Allende; Luis Alfredo Rivera; Luis Daniel Cuascut	Venezuela; Asa Abraham Acosta; Elian José Centenio; Ernesto Hernandez Castilla; José Javier Bracho	Chile; Aitor Pickett Heerwagen; Felipe Inyaco Toledo; Joaquin Piño Hernández; Lucas Thiebaut Capetta
Women's	Colombia; Carolina López; Isabel Rodríguez; Wendy Coy; Yuliany Paz	Dominican Republic; Nayely Morillo Feliz; Thais Rojas Bonilla; Yaira Faneyte Carbuccia; Yenifer Jimenez	Argentina; Candela Foresto; Candela Gentinetta; Georgina Buzzetti; Sofia Acevedo
Shoot Out Contest	Jovanka Ljubetic; Chile	Sofia Acevedo; Argentina	Hermann Andriano; Mexico

== Final standings ==
Rank	Men's	Women's
1st place, gold medalist(s)	Puerto Rico	Colombia
2nd place, silver medalist(s)	Venezuela	Dominican Republic
3rd place, bronze medalist(s)	Chile	Argentina
4	Dominican Republic	Chile
5	Uruguay	Uruguay
6	Brazil	Brazil
7	Argentina	Mexico
8	Trinidad and Tobago	Ecuador
9–12	Colombia; El Salvador; Ecuador; Mexico	Haiti; Saint Lucia; El Salvador; Puerto Rico
13–16	British Virgin Islands; Dominica; Guatemala; Saint Lucia	

Teams qualified to the 2023 Pan American Games

== Qualification ==
For each 3x3 tournament, the top 12 teams in each gender in the world rankings as of November 1, 2020 qualified. Host nation Colombia is the recipient of a wild card in case isn't in the ranking, if is, the quota will be given to the next best positioned.

== See also ==
- Basketball at the 2020 Summer Olympics
