= Fencing at the 2021 Junior Pan American Games =

- Fencing pictogram
- Venue: Pacific Valley Events Center
- Dates: 3–5 December
- Competitors: 95 from 25 nations

Fencing competitions at the 2021 Junior Pan American Games were held from December 3–5, 2021 in Yumbo, Valle del Cauca.

== Medal summary ==
=== Medal table ===
* Host nation (Colombia)

| Rank | Nation | Gold | Silver | Bronze | Total |
|---|---|---|---|---|---|
| 1 | Chile | 2 | 1 | 1 | 4 |
| 2 | Argentina | 2 | 1 | 0 | 3 |
| 3 | Venezuela | 1 | 2 | 1 | 4 |
| 4 | Brazil | 1 | 1 | 0 | 2 |
| 5 | Colombia* | 0 | 1 | 0 | 1 |
| 6 | Mexico | 0 | 0 | 5 | 5 |
| 7 | United States | 0 | 0 | 2 | 2 |
| 8 | Cuba | 0 | 0 | 1 | 1 |
| 8 | Panama | 0 | 0 | 1 | 1 |
| 8 | Paraguay | 0 | 0 | 1 | 1 |
| Totals (10 entries) | | 6 | 6 | 12 | 24 |

== Medalists ==
| Event | Gold | Silver | Bronze |
|---|---|---|---|
| Boys' Épée | Jorge Valderrama; Chile | Lucio Pérez; Argentina | Julio Arias Petterson; Panama |
| Boys' Épée | Jorge Valderrama; Chile | Lucio Pérez; Argentina | Ricardo Amador Sanchez; Mexico |
| Boys' Foil | Dante Cerquetti; Argentina | Miguel Grajales; Colombia | Diego Cervantes; Mexico |
| Boys' Foil | Dante Cerquetti; Argentina | Miguel Grajales; Colombia | Ethan Gassner; United States |
| Boys' Sabre | Hender Medina; Venezuela | Roberto Monsalva Estay; Chile | Hugo Abel Castro; Mexico |
| Boys' Sabre | Hender Medina; Venezuela | Roberto Monsalva Estay; Chile | Carter Berrio; United States |
| Girls' Épée | Victoria Vizeu; Brazil | Clarismar Farias; Venezuela | Rosario Del Rio Abarca; Chile |
| Girls' Épée | Victoria Vizeu; Brazil | Clarismar Farias; Venezuela | Gabriela Mendoza; Paraguay |
| Girls' Foil | Katina Proestakis; Chile | Anabella Gonzalez; Venezuela | Jimena Gutierrez; Mexico |
| Girls' Foil | Katina Proestakis; Chile | Anabella Gonzalez; Venezuela | Melissa Blanco; Cuba |
| Girls' Sabre | Candela Espinosa Veloso; Argentina | Pietra Chierighini; Brazil | Natalia Botello; Mexico |
| Girls' Sabre | Candela Espinosa Veloso; Argentina | Pietra Chierighini; Brazil | Crelia Ramos; Venezuela |
