= Archery at the 2021 Junior Pan American Games =

- Archery pictogram
- Venue: Estadio Francisco Rivera Escobar
- Dates: 25–28 November
- Competitors: 65 from 19 nations

Archery competitions at the 2021 Junior Pan American Games in Cali, Colombia were held from November 25 to 28, 2021.

== Medal summary ==
=== Medal table ===
* Host nation (Colombia)

Rank	Nation	Gold	Silver	Bronze	Total
1	Mexico	6	2	0	8
2	United States	2	3	1	6
3	Colombia*	0	3	2	5
4	El Salvador	0	0	2	2
4	Puerto Rico	0	0	2	2
6	Brazil	0	0	1	1
Totals (6 entries)		8	8	8	24

== Medalists ==
=== Recurve ===
Event	Gold	Silver	Bronze
Men's Individual	Trenton Cowles; United States	Jesús Flores; Mexico	Adrian Muñoz; Puerto Rico
Men's Team	Mexico; Jesús Flores; Carlos Vaca	United States; Trenton Cowles; Oh Joonsuh	Puerto Rico; Carlos Jaynsquel Acevedo; Adrian Muñoz
Women's Individual	Valentina Vázquez; Mexico	Allyx Zuluaga; Colombia	Casey Kaufhold; United States
Women's Team	Mexico; Akshara Licea; Valentina Vázquez	United States; Casey Kaufhold; Gabrielle Sasai	Brazil; Ana Luiza Caetano; Ana Carolina Popperl
Mixed Team	United States; Casey Kaufhold; Trenton Cowles	Mexico; Valentina Vázquez; Carlos Vaca	Colombia; Allyx Zuluaga; Juan José Molina

=== Compound ===
Event	Gold	Silver	Bronze
Men's Individual	Sebastián García; Mexico	Cole Frederick; United States	Pablo Gómez; Colombia
Women's Individual	Dafne Quintero; Mexico	María Suárez; Colombia	Paola Corado; El Salvador
Mixed Team	Mexico; Dafne Quintero; Sebastian García	Colombia; María Suárez; Pablo Gómez	El Salvador; Paola Corado; Gerardi Rivas

== See also ==
- 2021 Pan American Archery Championships
- Archery at the 2020 Summer Olympics
