= Ali Feliz =

American boxer (born 2003)

Personal information
- Born: Ali Fernely Feliz; September 3, 2003 (age 22) Danbury, Connecticut, U.S.
- Height: 6 ft 2 in (188 cm)
- Weight: Heavyweight

Boxing career
- Reach: 76 in (193 cm)
- Stance: Orthodox

Boxing record
- Total fights: 7
- Wins: 7
- Win by KO: 5
- Losses: 0
- No contests: 0
Medal record
Representing United States
Men's Boxing
USA National Championships
Gold medal – first place	2022 Lubbock	+92kg
Junior Pan American Games
Silver medal – second place	2021 Cali	+91kg
USA Youth National Championships
Silver medal – second place	2020 Shreveport	+91kg

Ali Feliz is an American professional boxer. He is currently signed with Top Rank.

== Amateur career ==
Feliz led a decorated amateur career with winning a few medals. The first one being in 2020 during the USA Youth National Championships. During this tournament, he placed 2nd in the +91 kg category.

A year later, he would take a big step by taking part in the Junior Pan American Games in Cali. Feliz would go on to have quite the tournament, before losing in the final, and coming home with a silver medal.

His greatest accomplishment would come the following year when he took part in the USA National Championships. Feliz would go all the way and win first place and win a golden medal.

In 2024, he would attempt to qualify for the 2024 Summer Olympics, however, he would lose in the first qualifying round. During this tournament, he would opt to represent the nationality of his parents of Dominican Republic.

== Professional career ==
On March 14, 2024, it was announced that Feliz has signed with promotion Top Rank. A month later, Feliz would make his professional debut in a bout against Anthony Woodson III who he'd beat via TKO in the second round.

== Professional boxing record ==
7 fights	7 wins	0 losses
By knockout	5	0
By decision	2	0

No.	Result	Record	Opponent	Type	Round, time	Date	Location	Notes
7	Win	7–0	Joel Caudle	UD	6	Dec 7, 2025	2300 Arena, Philadelphia, Pennsylvania, U.S.	
6	Win	6–0	Brandon Carmack	TKO	2 (6) 1:31	May 10, 2025	Foxwoods Resort Casino, Mashantucket, Connecticut, U.S.	
5	Win	5–0	Robinson Perez	TKO	1 (6) 1:39	Feb 15, 2025	Mohegan Sun Arena, Uncasville, Connecticut, U.S.	
4	Win	4–0	Orlando Rashad Coulter	TKO	2 (6) 1:34	Nov 2, 2024	Turning Stone Resort Casino, Verona, New York, U.S.	
3	Win	3–0	Robinson Perez	UD	4	Jul 6, 2024	Prudential Center, Newark, New Jersey, U.S.	
2	Win	2–0	Lemir Ison-Riley	TKO	1 (4) 1:25	Jun 8, 2024	The Theater at Madison Square Garden, New York City, New York, U.S.	
1	Win	1–0	Anthony Woodson III	TKO	2 (4) 1:16	Apr 13, 2024	American Bank Center, Corpus Christi, Texas, U.S.	
