= Tennis at the 2021 Junior Pan American Games =

- Tennis pictogram
- Venue: Club Campestre de Cali
- Dates: 29 November – 4 December
- Competitors: 65 from 21 nations

Tennis competitions at the 2021 Junior Pan American Games in Cali, Colombia were scheduled to be held from November 29 until December 4, 2021.

== Medal summary ==
=== Medal table ===
* Host nation (Colombia)

| Rank | Nation | Gold | Silver | Bronze | Total |
|---|---|---|---|---|---|
| 1 | Peru | 3 | 1 | 1 | 5 |
| 2 | Argentina | 2 | 1 | 0 | 3 |
| 3 | Mexico | 0 | 1 | 1 | 2 |
| 3 | Paraguay | 0 | 1 | 1 | 2 |
| 5 | Bolivia | 0 | 1 | 0 | 1 |
| 6 | Brazil | 0 | 0 | 1 | 1 |
| 6 | Ecuador | 0 | 0 | 1 | 1 |
| Totals (7 entries) | | 5 | 5 | 5 | 15 |

== Medalists ==
| Event | Gold | Silver | Bronze |
|---|---|---|---|
| Boys' singles | Gonzalo Bueno; Peru | Juan Carlos Prado Ángelo; Bolivia | Álvaro Guillén Meza; Ecuador |
| Boys' doubles | Peru; Gonzalo Bueno; Ignacio Buse | Argentina; Lautaro Ballesteros; Juan Manuel La Serna | Paraguay; Daniel Vallejo; Martin Vergara |
| Girls' singles | Luciana Moyano; Argentina | Leyla Britez; Paraguay | Daianne Hayashida; Peru |
| Girls' doubles | Peru; Lucciana Pérez Alarcón; Daianne Hayashida | Mexico; Julia García; Maria Fernanda Martínez | Brazil; Ana Candiotto; Juliana Munhoz |
| Mixed doubles | Argentina; Luciana Moyano; Lautaro Ballesteros | Peru; Lucciana Pérez Alarcón; Christopher Ludeña | Mexico; Julia García; Emiliano Aguilera |
