= Boxing at the 2021 Junior Pan American Games =

- Boxing pictogram
- Venue: Luis Ignacio Alvarez Arena
- Dates: 26 November–1 December

Boxing competitions at the 2021 Junior Pan American Games in Cali, Colombia were scheduled to be held from November 26 until December 1, 2021.

== Medal summary ==
=== Medal table ===
* Host nation (Colombia)

Rank	Nation	Gold	Silver	Bronze	Total
1	United States	5	3	4	12
2	Cuba	4	1	1	6
3	Colombia*	3	2	6	11
4	Venezuela	1	0	1	2
5	Mexico	0	3	3	6
6	Brazil	0	3	1	4
7	Argentina	0	1	2	3
8	Ecuador	0	0	3	3
9	Puerto Rico	0	0	2	2
10	Dominican Republic	0	0	1	1
10	Guatemala	0	0	1	1
10	Panama	0	0	1	1
Totals (12 entries)		13	13	26	52

== Medalists ==
=== Men's ===
Event	Gold	Silver	Bronze
52 kg	Ewart Marin Hernández; Cuba	Isaias Navarri; United States	José Daniel Mijangos; Guatemala
52 kg	Ewart Marin Hernández; Cuba	Isaias Navarri; United States	César Martin Astorga; Argentina
57 kg	Julius Ballo; United States	Pablo Capistrano; Brazil	William Colon Vazquez; Puerto Rico
57 kg	Julius Ballo; United States	Pablo Capistrano; Brazil	Jhon Orobio; Colombia
63 kg	Carlos Utria; Colombia	Hebert Soares; Brazil	William Ortiz Rivera; Puerto Rico
63 kg	Carlos Utria; Colombia	Hebert Soares; Brazil	Joel Iriarte; United States
69 kg	Quincey Williams; United States	Jorge Forcades Mena; Cuba	Piero MPrieto; Ecuador
69 kg	Quincey Williams; United States	Jorge Forcades Mena; Cuba	Yeferson Belalcazar; Colombia
75 kg	Khriszthihan Barrera Arias; Cuba	Joel Orlando Salva; Argentina	Donte Layne; United States
75 kg	Khriszthihan Barrera Arias; Cuba	Joel Orlando Salva; Argentina	Cristian Enrique Garcia; Colombia
81 kg	Luis Reynoso Valiente; Cuba	Ricardo de Oliveira Filho; Brazil	Santiago Franco; United States
81 kg	Luis Reynoso Valiente; Cuba	Ricardo de Oliveira Filho; Brazil	Sebastián Moreno; Colombia
91 kg	Ronny Alvarez Noa; Cuba	Sebastian Andres Murillo; Colombia	Ali Almajdi; United States
91 kg	Ronny Alvarez Noa; Cuba	Sebastian Andres Murillo; Colombia	Angel Daniel López; Mexico
+91 kg	Marlon Hurtado; Colombia	Ali Feliz; United States	Adrian Fresneda Ricardo; Cuba
+91 kg	Marlon Hurtado; Colombia	Ali Feliz; United States	Erick Naranjo; Ecuador

=== Women's ===
Event	Gold	Silver	Bronze
51 kg	Kayla Gomez; United States	Margarita Murguia; Mexico	Novoanny Nuñez; Dominican Republic
51 kg	Kayla Gomez; United States	Margarita Murguia; Mexico	Flor Rodríguez; Colombia
57 kg	Jewry Rodriguez; United States	Rosa Astrid de la Luz; Mexico	Xiomara Santamaría; Panama
57 kg	Jewry Rodriguez; United States	Rosa Astrid de la Luz; Mexico	Sol Ayelen Medina; Argentina
60 kg	Camila Camilo; Colombia	Faith Mendez; United States	Juliannys Alvarez; Venezuela
60 kg	Camila Camilo; Colombia	Faith Mendez; United States	Gema Morales; Mexico
69 kg	Jesikah Guerra; United States	Maria Guadalupe Rodríguez; Mexico	Samara Couto dos Santos; Brazil
69 kg	Jesikah Guerra; United States	Maria Guadalupe Rodríguez; Mexico	Roxana Briceño; Colombia
75 kg	Maryelis Yriza; Venezuela	Angie Solano; Colombia	Janina Cuero Boya; Ecuador
75 kg	Maryelis Yriza; Venezuela	Angie Solano; Colombia	Darianne Hernandez; Mexico
