= María Sánchez (diver) =

Mexican diver (born 2005)

Personal information
- Full name: María José Sánchez Moreno
- Nationality: Mexican
- Born: 3 July 2005 (age 20)

Sport
- Country: Mexico
- Sport: Diving
- Event: 10 m platform synchro
Medal record
World Championships
Bronze medal – third place	2019 Gwangju	10 m mixed synchro
Junior Pan American Games
Silver medal – second place	2025 Asunción	10 m synchro

María José Sánchez Moreno (born 3 July 2005) is a Mexican diver. She participated at the 2019 World Aquatics Championships, winning a bronze medal.
