= Modern pentathlon at the 2021 Junior Pan American Games =

- Modern pentathlon pictogram
- Venue: Club Campestre de Cali
- Dates: 2–5 December
- Competitors: 46 from 15 nations

Modern pentathlon competitions at the 2021 Junior Pan American Games in Cali, Colombia were held from 2 to 5 December 2021.

== Medal summary ==
=== Medal table ===
* Host nation (Colombia)

Rank	Nation	Gold	Silver	Bronze	Total
1	Mexico	2	1	0	3
2	Ecuador	1	0	0	1
3	Argentina	0	1	1	2
4	Guatemala	0	1	0	1
5	Brazil	0	0	1	1
5	Cuba	0	0	1	1
Totals (6 entries)		3	3	3	9

== Medalists ==
Event	Gold		Silver		Bronze	
Men's	Andres Sebastian Torres; Ecuador	1497	Franco Santiago Serrano; Argentina	1443	Matheus Santos Nobre; Brazil	1436
Women's	Catherine Oliver; Mexico	1326	Ana Cecilia Meza; Mexico	1279	Camila Fernanda Fuenzalida; Argentina	1265
Mixed Relay	Mexico; Catherine Oliver; Lorenzo Macias	1457	Guatemala; Andres Fernandez Anleu; Paula Valencia Franco	1419	Cuba; Diana Leyva Dinza; Marcos Rojas Jimenez	1399
