= Diego Cervantes (fencer) =

Mexican fencer

Personal information
- Nationality: Mexico
- Born: 11 February 2001 (age 25) Mexicali, Mexico

Sport
- Sport: Fencing
- Event: Men's individual foil
Medal record
Men's fencing
Representing Mexico
Pan American Championships
Bronze medal – third place	2026 Lima	Team
Cadet World Championships
Bronze medal – third place	2018 Verona	Individual foil
Junior Pan American Games
Bronze medal – third place	2021 Cali-Valle	Individual foil

Diego Alekce Cervantes López (born 11 February 2001) is a Mexican foil fencer. He competed in the 2020 Summer Olympics held in Tokyo, Japan.
