= Calima Lake =

Reservoir in Valle del Cauca, Colombia

- Lago Calima (Spanish)
- Aerial view of Calima Lake

- Location within Colombia
- Location: Darién, Valle del Cauca
- Coordinates: 3°53′40.45″N 76°29′41.58″W
- Type: reservoir
- Basin countries: Colombia
- Surface area: 70 km^{2} (27 sq mi)
- Surface elevation: 1,500 meters (4,900 feet)

Calima Lake (Spanish: Lago Calima) is the largest artificial lake in Colombia, with an area of 19.34 km^{2}. It is located in the municipality of Darién in the Valle del Cauca Department.

The lake is part of a hydroelectric project for generating power for the department. C.V.C (Corporación Autónoma Regional del Valle del Cauca) started the construction of the lake in 1961.

Calima Lake has become a place for water sports and leisure activities. Vacation centers, restaurants, and camping zones were built near the lake. The lake is currently a popular place and is frequented by both national and international tourists, especially those from nearby cities and towns, like Cali and Buga. The elevation of the lake is 1,500 meters (4,900 feet) above sea level.

== Routes ==
There are three major routes to arrive to Darién from Cali, the closest city, by road/

- Cali - Palmira - Buga - Darién, 108 km. This route has the best conditions
- Cali - Yumbo - Vijes - Darién, 93 km. Although this is one of the most crowded routes, the road is in good condition and offers great landscapes alongside the Cauca River.
- Cali - Dagua - Loboguerrero - Darién, 100 km. This route

== Weather ==
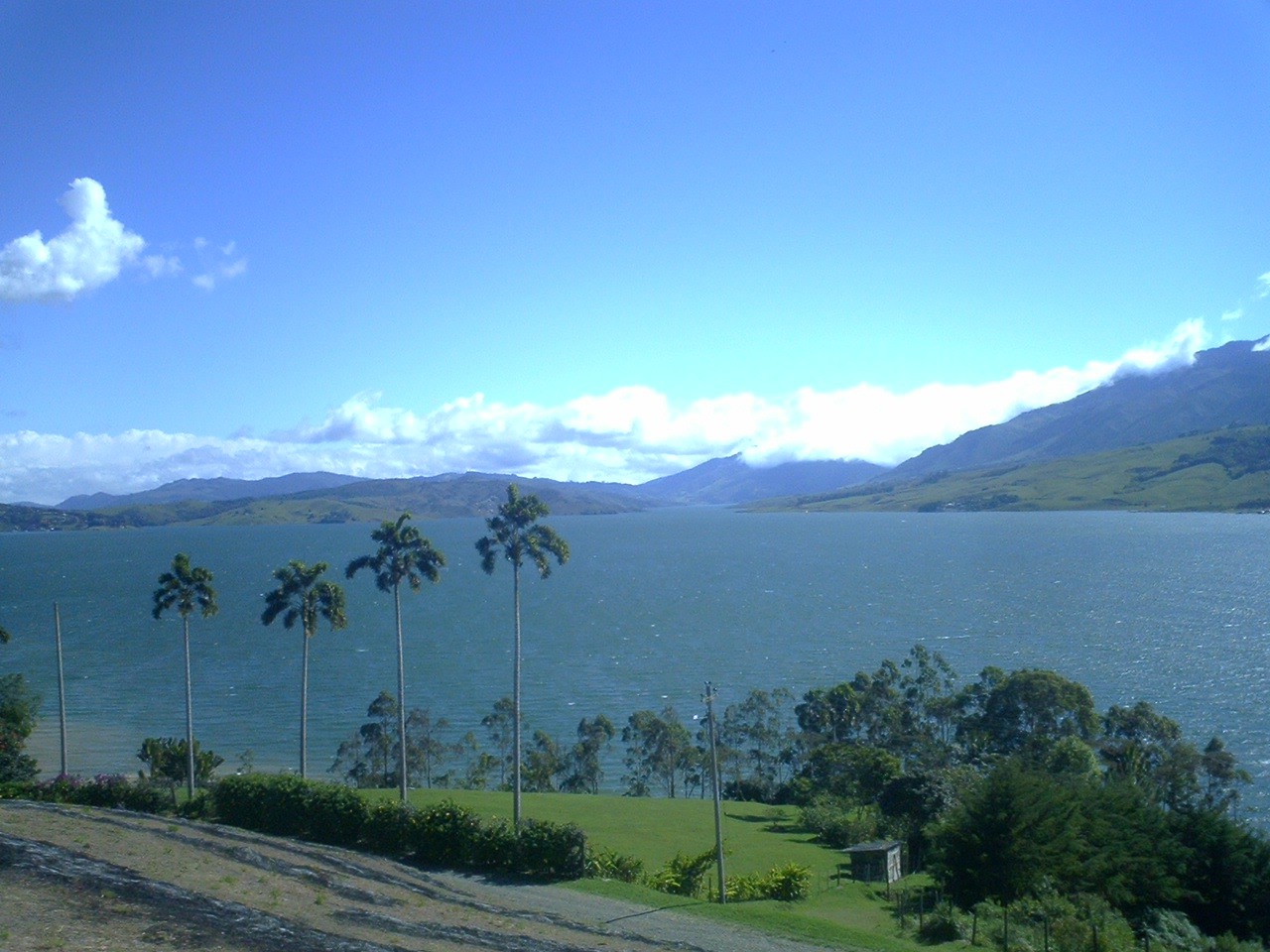
Lakeside from Darién

The average annual temperature is 18.8 °C, although by afternoon and in the night can be colder. The temperature ranges from 14.0 °C to 28.8 °C. The weather is classified as humid meso-thermal with a rain period of 189 days.

== Festivals ==
By the end of August, some cultural festivals and parties are celebrated in the town of Darién and near the lake. The "Black and White Sensations" electronic music festival is notable because it resembles a similar event hosted in Amsterdam. It is one of the most well-known outdoor events of its kind inland and gathers music lovers from all over the country.

== Sports ==
Thanks to the strong and constant winds, Calima Lake is the best place in Colombia for all types of water and extreme sports. At certain points, the wind can reach up to +30 knots. Kitesurfing is one of the most popular sports, since the wind is frequent and strong all year long. There are different kite spots and schools one next to the other that make this place one of the most desired spots in Colombia for the kiters. Windsurfing is also practised. Additionally, the most recent event is the Triathlon.

Different types of kitesurf and windsurf contests take place in this lake during the whole year, where people from different countries also participate.

Since this large lake remains warm throughout the year, there's no need of wetsuit generally.
