= Calima, Valle del Cauca =

Calima
- Municipality
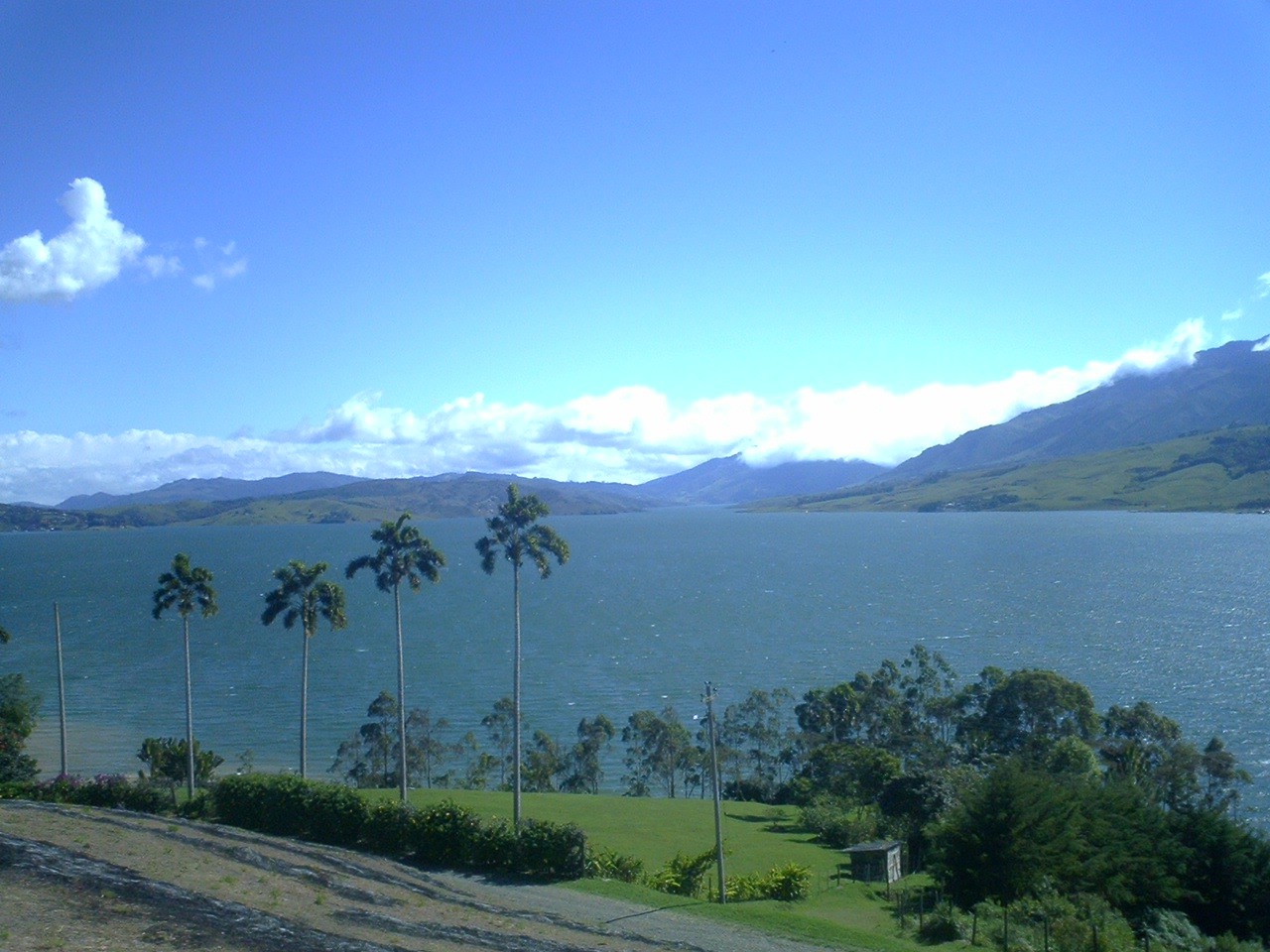

- Flag Coat of arms

- Location of the municipality and town of Calima, Valle del Cauca in the Valle del Cauca Department of Colombia.

- Location in Colombia
- Coordinates: 3°55′N 76°40′W
- Country: Colombia
- Department: Valle del Cauca Department

Area
  - Total: 219 km^{2} (85 sq mi)

Population (Census 2018)
  - Total: 16,054
  - Density: 73.3/km^{2} (190/sq mi)
- Time zone: UTC-5 (Colombia Standard Time)

Calima is a municipality located in the Department of Valle del Cauca, Colombia. Its main urban area is the town of Darién.
