= Brazil at the 2021 Junior Pan American Games =

- IOC code: BRA
- NOC: Brazilian Olympic Committee

in Cali–Valle del Cauca, Colombia
- Competitors: 358 in 38 sports
- Flag bearers (opening): Pâmela Rosa; Breno Correia
- Flag bearer (closing): Giulia Takahashi
- Medals Ranked 1st: Gold 59 Silver 49 Bronze 56 Total 164

Junior Pan American Games appearances (overview)
- 2021; 2025

Brazil competed in the 2021 Junior Pan American Games in Cali–Valle, Colombia from 25 November to 5 December 2021.

A flag bearers at the opening ceremony were skateboarder Pâmela Rosa and swimmer Breno Correia. At the closing ceremony flag bearer was table tennis player Giulia Takahashi, who won four medals.

Brazil won the most gold medals and won the medal table. Brazil get 59 gold, 49 silver and 56 bronze medals.

== Competitors ==
The following is the list of number of competitors (per gender) participating at the games per sport.

Miguel Hidalgo started in athletics and triathlon.
Amanda Kunkel, Yana Camargo, Otávio Gonzeli and Pedro Guilherme Rossi started in cycling road and cycling track.

Sport	M	W	Total
3x3 basketball	4	4	8
Archery	3	3	6
Artistic gymnastics	4	4	8
Artistic skating	1	1	2
Artistic swimming	1	8	9
Athletics	36	33	69
Badminton	2	2	4
Baseball	22	—N/a	22
Beach volleyball	2	2	4
Boxing	6	3	9
Canoeing sprint	4	2	6
Cycling mountain biking	1	1	2
Cycling BMX racing	2	2	4
Cycling road	3	4	7
Cycling track	3	4	7
Diving	3	3	6
Fencing	3	3	6
Handball	14	14	28
Judo	6	6	12
Karate	4	5	9
Modern pentathlon	2	2	4
Rhythmic gymnastics	—N/a	7	7
Rowing	1	1	2
Skateboarding	1	1	2
Softball	—N/a	16	16
Sailing	2	1	3
Shooting	4	4	8
Speed skating	1	1	2
Squash	3	0	3
Swimming	11	14	25
Table tennis	2	2	4
Taekwondo	2	3	5
Tennis	3	3	6
Trampoline gymnastics	2	2	4
Triathlon	2	2	4
Volleyball	12	12	24
Weightlifting	3	3	6
Wrestling	5	5	10
Total	177	186	358

== Medalists ==
Medal	Athlete	Sport	Event	Date
Gold	Matheus Gonche	Swimming	Men's 200 metre butterfly	26 November
Gold	Maria Paula Heitmann	Swimming	Women's 400 metre freestyle	26 November
Gold	Breno Correia; Victor Alcará; Lucas Peixoto; Vitor Baganha	Swimming	Men's 4 × 100 metre freestyle relay	26 November
Gold	Ana Carolina Vieira; Fernanda Celidônio; Clarissa Rodrigues; Stephanie Balduccini	Swimming	Women's 4 × 100 metre freestyle relay	26 November
Gold	Alexia Nascimento	Judo	Women's 48 kg	26 November
Gold	Gabriel Falcão	Judo	Men's 73 kg	26 November
Gold	Lucas Rabelo	Skateboarding	Men's street	26 November
Gold	Pâmela Rosa	Skateboarding	Women's street	26 November
Gold	Sandy Macedo	Taekwondo	Women's 57 kg	26 November
Gold	Miguel Hidalgo	Triathlon	Men's individual	26 November
Gold	Clarissa Rodrigues	Swimming	Women's 100 metre butterfly	27 November
Gold	Kayky Mota	Swimming	Men's 100 metre butterfly	27 November
Gold	Breno Correia	Swimming	Men's 200 metre freestyle	27 November
Gold	Ana Carolina Vieira	Swimming	Women's 200 metre freestyle	27 November
Gold	Ana Carolina Vieira; Clarissa Rodrigues; Lucas Peixoto; Victor Alcará; Breno Correia; Fernanda Celidônio; Stephanie Balduccini; Vitor Baganha	Swimming	Mixed 4 × 100 metre freestyle relay	27 November
Gold	Kayo Santos	Judo	Men's 100 kg	27 November
Gold	Luana Carvalho	Judo	Women's 70 kg	27 November
Gold	Eliza Ramos	Judo	Women's 78 kg	27 November
Gold	Diego Araújo do Nascimento; Evandilson Avelar Neto	Canoeing sprint	Men's C2 1000 metres	27 November
Gold	Breno Correia	Swimming	Men's 100 metre freestyle	28 November
Gold	Stephanie Balduccini	Swimming	Women's 100 metre freestyle	28 November
Gold	Ana Carolina Vieira; Giulia Carvalho; Matheus Gonche; Stephanie Balduccini; Bruna Leme; Kayky Mota; Ney Lima Filho; Vitor Baganha	Swimming	Mixed 4 × 100 metre relay medley	28 November
Gold	Eliza Ramos; Kayo Santos; Marcos Soares dos Santos; Victor Hugo Nascimento; Gabriel Falcão; Luana Carvalho; Thayane Lemos	Judo	Mixed team	28 November
Gold	Ana Carolina Vieira; Maria Paula Heitmann; Rafaela Raurich; Stephanie Balduccini	Swimming	Women's 4 × 200 metre freestyle relay	29 November
Gold	Breno Correia; Eduardo Moraes; Lucas Peixoto; Stephan Steverink	Swimming	Men's 4 × 200 metre freestyle relay	29 November
Gold	Victor Alcará	Swimming	Men's 50 metre freestyle	29 November
Gold	Stephanie Balduccini	Swimming	Women's 50 metre freestyle	29 November
Gold	Diogo Speranza Paes	Artistic gymnastics	Men's horizontal bar	29 November
Gold	Pedro Guastelli	Swimming	Men's 1500 metre freestyle	30 November
Gold	Beatriz Dizotti	Swimming	Women's 1500 metre freestyle	30 November
Gold	Clarissa Rodrigues; Giulia Carvalho; Julia Karla Goes; Stephanie Balduccini	Swimming	Women's 4 × 100 metre relay medley	30 November
Gold	Pedro Henrique Rodrigues	Athletics	Men's javelin throw	30 November
Gold	Brazil women's national under-23 volleyball team: Diana Duarte; Gabrielle Marcondes; Jackeline Moreno; Jheovana Sebastião; Kenya Malachias; Lia Vitória Mariano; Lorena Viezel; Lorrayna Marys; Marcelle da Silva; Mayhara da Silva; Milena Vilela Miranda; Pamela Sanábio	Volleyball	Women's team	30 November
Gold	Guilherme Abel Rocha	Speed skating	Men's 200 metres time-trial	30 November
Gold	Erik Cardoso	Athletics	Men's 100 metres	1 December
Gold	José Fernando Ferreira	Athletics	Men's decathlon	1 December
Gold	Igor Queiroz	Wrestling	Men's Greco-Roman 97 kg	1 December
Gold	Guilherme Abel Rocha	Speed skating	Men's 500 metres + distance	1 December
Gold	Giulia Takahashi; Rafael Turrini	Table tennis	Mixed doubles	1 December
Gold	Chayenne da Silva	Athletics	Women's 400 metres hurdles	2 December
Gold	Adrian Vieira; Erik Cardoso; Lucas Vilar; Lucas Rodrigues	Athletics	Men's 4 × 100 metres relay	2 December
Gold	Alencar Chagas	Athletics	Men's hammer throw	2 December
Gold	Isabel Quadros	Athletics	Women's pole vault	2 December
Gold	Chayenne da Silva; Maria Victória de Sena; Marlene dos Santos; Tiffani Marinho	Athletics	Women's 4 × 400 metres relay	3 December
Gold	Mirelle da Silva	Athletics	Women's 3000 metres steeplechase	4 December
Gold	Chayenne da Silva; Douglas Mendes; João Henrique Falcão; Tiffani Marinho	Athletics	Mixed 4 × 400 metres mixed relay	4 December
Gold	Rafael Andrew; Renato Andrew	Beach volleyball	Men's tournament	4 December
Gold	Thainara Oliveira; Victoria Lopes	Beach volleyball	Women's tournament	4 December
Gold	Bárbara Hellen Rodrigues	Karate	Women's 68 kg	4 December
Gold	Rayan Dutra	Trampoline gymnastics	Men's individual	4 December
Gold	Maria Eduarda Alexandre	Rhythmic gymnastics	Women's individual all-around	4 December
Gold	Victória Vizeu	Fencing	Women's individual épée	4 December
Gold	Brazil men's national junior handball team: Carlos Magno Santos; Davi Langaro; Edney Oliveira; Gerson Lucas; Joel Matos; José Lopes Neto; Leandro Alves; Lucas Pereira; Luís André Sabóia; Luís Gustavo Garcia; Marcos Antônio Silva; Marcos Vinicius Braga; Natan Silva; Tarcísio Oliveira	Handball	Men's tournament	4 December
Gold	Bianca Reis; Fernanda Heinemann; Gabryela da Rocha; Julia Kurunczi; Luiza Pugliese	Rhythmic gymnastics	Women's group 5 ribbons	5 December
Gold	Maria Eduarda Alexandre	Rhythmic gymnastics	Women's individual clubs	5 December
Gold	Maria Eduarda Alexandre	Rhythmic gymnastics	Women's individual ball	5 December
Gold	Giulia Takahashi; Laura Watanabe	Table tennis	Women's team	5 December
Gold	Giovani Salgado	Karate	Men's +84 kg	5 December
Gold	Brazil men's national under-23 volleyball team: Adriano Xavier; André Luiz Ludegards; Guilherme Sabino; Gustavo Orlando; João Franck; Kelvi Giovani; Lucas Augusto; Maicon França; Paulo Sérgio Carraro; Pietro Santos; Rafael Forster; Vitor Yudi	Volleyball	Men's tournament	5 December
Silver	Giulia Carvalho	Swimming	Women's 100 metre breaststroke	26 November
Silver	Rafaela Raurich	Swimming	Women's 200 metre butterfly	26 November
Silver	Eduardo Moraes	Swimming	Men's 400 metre freestyle	26 November
Silver	Caio Blasques de Almeida	Shooting	Men's 10 metre air pistol	26 November
Silver	Diogo Speranza Paes; João Victor Perdigão; Gustavo Pereira; Yuri Guimarães	Artistic gymnastics	Men's team all-around	26 November
Silver	Matheus Gonche	Swimming	Men's 100 metre butterfly	27 November
Silver	Marcos Soares dos Santos	Judo	Men's 81 kg	27 November
Silver	Samuel Pereira	Cycling BMX racing	Men's BMX race	27 November
Silver	Andreza Lima; Gabriela Barbosa; Gabriela Reis; Josiany Calixto	Artistic gymnastics	Women's team all-around	27 November
Silver	Julia Karla Goes	Swimming	Women's 100 metre backstroke	28 November
Silver	Ana Carolina Vieira	Swimming	Women's 100 metre freestyle	28 November
Silver	Lucas Peixoto	Swimming	Men's 100 metre freestyle	28 November
Silver	Bruna Leme	Swimming	Women's 200 metre breaststroke	28 November
Silver	Stephan Steverink	Swimming	Men's 800 metre freestyle	28 November
Silver	Beatriz Dizotti	Swimming	Women's 800 metre freestyle	28 November
Silver	Stephan Steverink	Swimming	Men's 400 metre individual medley	29 November
Silver	Fernanda de Goeij	Swimming	Women's 400 metre individual medley	29 November
Silver	Lucas Peixoto	Swimming	Men's 50 metre freestyle	29 November
Silver	Deyse Barbosa	Swimming	Women's 50 metre freestyle	29 November
Silver	Yuri Guimarães	Artistic gymnastics	Men's parallel bars	29 November
Silver	Breno Correia; Kayky Mota; Matheus Gonche; Ney Lima Filho; Stephan Steverink; Victor Alcará; Vitor Baganha	Swimming	Men's 4 × 100 metre relay medley	30 November
Silver	Fabio Jesus Correia	Athletics	Men's 5,000 metres	30 November
Silver	Luiz Maurício da Silva	Athletics	Men's javelin throw	30 November
Silver	Matheus Corrêa	Athletics	Men's 20 kilometres race walk	1 December
Silver	Pablo Capistrano	Boxing	Men's 57 kg	1 December
Silver	Hebert Bandeira Soares	Boxing	Men's 63 kg	1 December
Silver	Ricardo Cândido de Oliveira Filho	Boxing	Men's 81 kg	1 December
Silver	Ketiley Batista	Athletics	Women's 100 metres hurdles	2 December
Silver	Caio de Almeida Teixeira	Athletics	Men's 400 metres hurdles	2 December
Silver	Gabriela Mourão; Letícia Lima; Rita de Cássia Silva; Vida Aurora	Athletics	Women's 4 × 100 metres relay	2 December
Silver	Giulia Takahashi; Laura Watanabe	Table tennis	Women's doubles	2 December
Silver	Lucas Vilar	Athletics	Men's 200 metres	3 December
Silver	Caio de Almeida Teixeira; Douglas Mendes; João Henrique Falcão; Matheus Coelho	Athletics	Men's 4 × 400 metres relay	3 December
Silver	Maria Lucineide Moreira	Athletics	Women's 5,000 metres	3 December
Silver	Ana Caroline Silva	Athletics	Women's shot put	3 December
Silver	Elton Petronilho	Athletics	Men's high jump	3 December
Silver	Leonardo Santos de Jesus	Athletics	Men's 800 metres	4 December
Silver	Anna Laura Prezzoti	Karate	Women's 61 kg	4 December
Silver	Rayan Dutra; Vinicius Celestino	Trampoline gymnastics	Men's synchronized	4 December
Silver	Bianca Reis; Fernanda Heinemann; Gabryela da Rocha; Julia Kurunczi; Luiza Pugliese	Rhythmic gymnastics	Women's group all-around	4 December
Silver	Erik Medziukevicius	Artistic skating	Men's free skating	4 December
Silver	Tomás Levy	Rowing	Men's M1x	4 December
Silver	Giovanna Prada	Sailing	Women's windsurfing	4 December
Silver	Bianca Reis; Fernanda Heinemann; Gabryela da Rocha; Julia Kurunczi; Luiza Pugliese	Rhythmic gymnastics	Women's group 5 balls	5 December
Silver	Maria Eduarda Alexandre	Rhythmic gymnastics	Women's individual hoop	5 December
Silver	Isadora Oliveira	Rhythmic gymnastics	Women's individual ribbon	5 December
Silver	Diogo Silva; Rafael Turrini	Table tennis	Men's team	5 December
Silver	Lucas Bruno dos Santos	Karate	Men's 60 kg	5 December
Silver	Pietra Chierighini	Fencing	Women's individual sabre	5 December
Bronze	Bruna Leme	Swimming	Women's 100 metre breaststroke	26 November
Bronze	Kayky Mota	Swimming	Men's 200 metre butterfly	26 November
Bronze	Nauana Dores	Judo	Women's 63 kg	26 November
Bronze	Matheus Pereira	Judo	Men's 66 kg	26 November
Bronze	Filipe Vinicius	Canoeing sprint	Men's C1 1000 metres	26 November
Bronze	Fernanda de Goeij	Swimming	Women's 200 metre backstroke	27 November
Bronze	Daniel Bolezina	Judo	Men's +100 kg	27 November
Bronze	Luana Ribeiro	Judo	Women's +78 kg	27 November
Bronze	Maitê Naves	Cycling BMX racing	Women's BMX race	27 November
Bronze	Patrik Cardoso	Taekwondo	Men's +80 kg	27 November
Bronze	Henrique Marques	Taekwondo	Men's 80 kg	27 November
Bronze	Gustavo Xavier	Cycling mountain biking	Men's cross-country	27 November
Bronze	Giuliana Morgen	Cycling mountain biking	Women's cross-country	27 November
Bronze	Guilherme Sperandio	Swimming	Men's 800 metre freestyle	28 November
Bronze	Gustavo Pereira	Artistic gymnastics	Men's pommel horse	28 November
Bronze	Andreza Lima	Artistic gymnastics	Women's vault	28 November
Bronze	Ana Carolina Teodoro; Ana Luiza Caetano	Archery	Women's team recurve	28 November
Bronze	Kawan Pereira	Diving	Men's 10 metre platform	28 November
Bronze	Brazil women's national junior handball team: Ana Luiza Alves; Fernanda Paulino; Geandra Rodrigues; Jhennifer Lopes; Karolain Lewandowski; Kauani Klos; Luara de Paula Bastos; Marcela Arounian; Maria Grasielly Pereira; Maria Paula Lima; Mariana Araújo; Maryanna Ferreira; Ranielle França; Rebeca Cristini Araújo	Handball	Women's tournament	28 November
Bronze	Caio Blasques de Almeida; Sara Classer da Rosa	Shooting	Mixed pairs air pistol	28 November
Bronze	Diogo Speranza Paes	Artistic gymnastics	Men's parallel bars	29 November
Bronze	Andreza Lima	Artistic gymnastics	Women's balance beam	29 November
Bronze	Jaqueline Lima; Jonathan Matias	Badminton	Mixed doubles	29 November
Bronze	Juliana Vieira	Badminton	Women's individual	29 November
Bronze	Jonathan Matias	Badminton	Men's individual	29 November
Bronze	Taiane Justino	Weightlifting	Women's +87 kg	29 November
Bronze	Otávio Gonzeli; Pedro Guilherme Rossi	Cycling track	Men's madison	29 November
Bronze	Gabriel Pederiva; Rhuan Neves de Sousa	Squash	Men's doubles	29 November
Bronze	Stephan Steverink	Swimming	Men's 1500 metre freestyle	30 November
Bronze	Fernanda de Goeij	Swimming	Women's 200 metre individual medley	30 November
Bronze	Maria Lucineide Moreira	Athletics	Women's 10,000 metres	30 November
Bronze	Thainá Guerino Fernandes	Athletics	Women's long jump	30 November
Bronze	Samara Couto dos Santos	Boxing	Women's 69 kg	1 December
Bronze	João Pedro Rossi	Cycling road	Men's individual time trial	1 December
Bronze	Gabriel Pederiva; Rhuan Neves de Sousa; Yuri Pollak	Squash	Men's team	1 December
Bronze	Tiffani Marinho	Athletics	Women's 400 metres	2 December
Bronze	Matheus Coelho	Athletics	Men's 400 metres hurdles	2 December
Bronze	Arielly Monteiro	Athletics	Women's high jump	2 December
Bronze	Diogo Silva; Rafael Turrini	Table tennis	Men's doubles	2 December
Bronze	Giulia Takahashi	Table tennis	Women's individual	2 December
Bronze	Lucas Rodrigues	Athletics	Men's 200 metres	3 December
Bronze	Milena Sens	Athletics	Women's shot put	3 December
Bronze	Meiriele Santos Hora	Wrestling	Women's freestyle 62 kg	3 December
Bronze	Thaissa Ribeiro	Wrestling	Women's freestyle 68 kg	3 December
Bronze	Ana Candiotto; Juliana Munhoz	Tennis	Women's doubles	3 December
Bronze	Celina Rangel; Murillo Cunha	Artistic swimming	Mixed duet	3 December
Bronze	Eduardo Moreira	Athletics	Men's 800 metres	4 December
Bronze	Gabriel Pinheiro	Karate	Men's 75 kg	4 December
Bronze	André Simões dos Santos	Karate	Men's 84 kg	4 December
Bronze	Rafaela dos Santos Silva	Karate	Women's +68 kg	4 December
Bronze	Bruna Wurts	Artistic skating	Women's free skating	4 December
Bronze	Pedro Samuel	Wrestling	Men's freestyle 74 kg	4 December
Bronze	Matheus Nobre	Modern pentathlon	Men's individual	4 December
Bronze	Jaddy Milla; Jullia Catharino	Artistic swimming	Women's duet	4 December
Bronze	Isadora Oliveira	Rhythmic gymnastics	Women's individual clubs	5 December
Bronze	Isadora Oliveira	Rhythmic gymnastics	Women's individual ball	5 December

Medals by sport/discipline
Sport	1st place, gold medalist(s)	2nd place, silver medalist(s)	3rd place, bronze medalist(s)	Total
Swimming	19	15	6	40
Athletics	10	12	8	30
Judo	6	1	4	11
Rhythmic gymnastics	4	4	2	10
Karate	2	2	3	7
Table tennis	2	2	2	6
Beach volleyball	2	0	0	2
Skateboarding	2	0	0	2
Speed skating	2	0	0	2
Volleyball	2	0	0	2
Artistic gymnastics	1	3	4	8
Fencing	1	1	0	2
Trampoline gymnastics	1	1	0	2
Wrestling	1	0	3	4
Taekwondo	1	0	2	3
Canoeing sprint	1	0	1	2
Handball	1	0	1	2
Triathlon	1	0	0	1
Boxing	0	3	1	4
Artistic skating	0	1	1	2
Cycling BMX racing	0	1	1	2
Shooting	0	1	1	2
Rowing	0	1	0	1
Sailing	0	1	0	1
Badminton	0	0	3	3
Artistic swimming	0	0	2	2
Cycling mountain biking	0	0	2	2
Squash	0	0	2	2
Archery	0	0	1	1
Cycling road	0	0	1	1
Cycling track	0	0	1	1
Diving	0	0	1	1
Modern pentathlon	0	0	1	1
Tennis	0	0	1	1
Weightlifting	0	0	1	1
Total	59	49	56	164

Medals by gender
Gender	1st place, gold medalist(s)	2nd place, silver medalist(s)	3rd place, bronze medalist(s)	Total
Men	27	28	25	80
Women	27	21	28	76
Mixed	5	0	3	8
Total	59	49	56	164

Medals by day
Day	1st place, gold medalist(s)	2nd place, silver medalist(s)	3rd place, bronze medalist(s)	Total
26 November	10	5	5	20
27 November	9	4	8	21
28 November	4	6	7	17
29 November	5	5	8	18
30 November	6	3	4	13
1 December	5	4	3	12
2 December	4	4	5	13
3 December	1	5	6	12
4 December	9	7	8	24
5 December	6	6	2	14
Total	59	49	56	164

== See also ==
- Brazil at the Junior Pan American Games
