= Karate at the 2023 Pan American Games – Qualification =

The following is the qualification system and qualified athletes for the karate at the 2023 Pan American Games competitions.

== Qualification system ==
A total of 106 karatekas will qualify to compete (96 qualified across four qualification tournaments and 10 extra nominal spots to the winners of the 2021 Junior Pan American Games. There will be nine athletes qualified in each individual event, with the exception of individual kata, which will feature eight athletes. Each nation may enter a maximum of 12 athletes (six per gender). This consists of a maximum of one athlete in the individual events (12). This rule does not apply to the winners of the 2021 Junior Pan American Games. The host nation, Chile, automatically qualifies the maximum number of athletes (12).

Venezuela, Panama and Colombia's athletes will be eligible to qualify through the 2023 Central American and Caribbean Championship, while Mexico will qualify through the North American Cup.

== Qualification timeline ==
Events	Date	Venue
2021 Junior Pan American Games	December 3–5	Cali, Colombia
2022 South American Games	October 3–5	Asunción, Paraguay
2023 Central American and Caribbean Championship	March 1	Oaxtepec, Mexico
2023 North American Cup	April 5–6	Las Vegas, United States
2023 Pan American Championships	May 24	San José, Costa Rica

== Qualification summary ==
The following is a list of qualified countries and athletes per event.

NOC	Men						Women						Total
NOC	I kata	60 kg	67 kg	75 kg	84 kg	84+ kg	I kata	50 kg	55 kg	61 kg	68 kg	68+ kg	Total
Argentina	X		X			X		X	X	X			6
Aruba						X							1
Bolivia											X		1
Brazil	X	X	X	X		XX	X		X		XX	X	11
Canada				X			X	X	X		X	X	6
Chile	X	X	XX	X	X	X	X	X	X	X	X	X	13
Colombia		X	X	X	X	X	X		X	X	X	X	10
Cuba		X							X	X			3
Dominican Republic	X					X	X	X				X	5
Ecuador			X		X							X	3
El Salvador					X			X					2
Guatemala		X		X	X			X		X			5
Mexico	X	X	X	X	X				X		X	X	8
Nicaragua						X							1
Panama			X										1
Paraguay					X			X	X				3
Peru	X						X			X		X	4
Puerto Rico					X					X			2
United States	X	XX		XX	X	X	X	X	X	X	X	X	13
Uruguay		X		X									2
Venezuela	X		X				X	X		X	X		6
Total: 21 NOCs	8	9	9	9	9	9	8	9	9	9	9	9	106

== Men ==
=== Individual kata ===
Competition	Quota(s)	Qualified
Host	1	Chile
2022 South American Games	2	Peru; Argentina
2023 Central American and Caribbean Championship	2	Dominican Republic; Venezuela
2023 North American Cup	1	United States
2023 Pan American Championships	2	Brazil; Mexico
TOTAL	8	

=== -60 kg ===
Competition	Quota(s)	Qualified
Host	1	Chile
2021 Junior Pan American Games	1	Frank Ruiz (USA)
2022 South American Games	2	Brazil; Uruguay
2023 Central American and Caribbean Championship	2	Colombia; Guatemala
2023 North American Cup	1	Mexico
2023 Pan American Championships	2	United States; Cuba
TOTAL	9	

=== -67 kg ===
Competition	Quota(s)	Qualified
Host	1	Chile
2021 Junior Pan American Games	1	Tomas Fuentes (CHI)
2022 South American Games	2	Ecuador; Argentina
2023 Central American and Caribbean Championship	2	Venezuela; Colombia
2023 North American Cup	1	Mexico
2023 Pan American Championships	2	Brazil; Panama
TOTAL	9	

=== -75 kg ===
Competition	Quota(s)	Qualified
Host	1	Chile
2021 Junior Pan American Games	1	Safin Kasturi (USA)
2022 South American Games	2	Brazil; Uruguay
2023 Central American and Caribbean Championship	2	Colombia; Guatemala
2023 North American Cup	1	United States
2023 Pan American Championships	2	Canada; Mexico
TOTAL	9	

=== -84 kg ===
Competition	Quota(s)	Qualified
Host	1	Chile
2021 Junior Pan American Games	1	Saisheren Senpon (USA)
2022 South American Games	2	Ecuador; Paraguay
2023 Central American and Caribbean Championship	2	Guatemala; El Salvador
2023 North American Cup	1	Mexico
2023 Pan American Championships	2	Puerto Rico; Colombia
TOTAL	9	

=== +84 kg ===
Competition	Quota(s)	Qualified
Host	1	Chile
2021 Junior Pan American Games	1	Giovani Salgado (BRA)
2022 South American Games	2	Brazil; Argentina
2023 Central American and Caribbean Championship	2	Dominican Republic; Nicaragua
2023 North American Cup	1	United States
2023 Pan American Championships	2	Colombia; Aruba
TOTAL	9	

== Women ==
=== Individual kata ===
Competition	Quota(s)	Qualified
Host	1	Chile
2022 South American Games	2	Brazil; Ecuador
2023 Central American and Caribbean Championship	2	Dominican Republic; Venezuela
2023 North American Cup	1	United States
2023 Pan American Championships	2	Colombia; Canada
TOTAL	8	

=== -50 kg ===
Competition	Quota(s)	Qualified
Host	1	Chile
2021 Junior Pan American Games	1	Yamina Lahynssa (CAN)
2022 South American Games	2	Argentina; Peru
2023 Central American and Caribbean Championship	2	Venezuela; El Salvador
2023 North American Cup	1	United States
2023 Pan American Championships	2	Dominican Republic; Guatemala
TOTAL	9	

=== -55 kg ===
Competition	Quota(s)	Qualified
Host	1	Chile
2021 Junior Pan American Games	1	Trinity Allen (USA)
2022 South American Games	2	Paraguay; Argentina
2023 Central American and Caribbean Championship	2	Cuba; Colombia
2023 North American Cup	1	Canada
2023 Pan American Championships	2	Brazil; Mexico
TOTAL	9	

=== -61 kg ===
Competition	Quota(s)	Qualified
Host	1	Chile
2021 Junior Pan American Games	1	Janessa Fonseca (PUR)
2018 South American Games	2	Peru; Argentina
2023 Central American and Caribbean Championship	2	Guatemala; Colombia
2023 North American Cup	1	United States
2023 Pan American Championships	2	Venezuela; Cuba
TOTAL	9	

=== -68 kg ===
Competition	Quota(s)	Qualified
Host	1	Chile
2021 Junior Pan American Games	1	Barbara Rodrigues (BRA)
2022 South American Games	2	Brazil; Bolivia
2023 Central American and Caribbean Championship	2	Colombia; Venezuela
2023 North American Cup	1	Canada
2023 Pan American Championships	2	United States; Mexico
TOTAL	9	

=== +68 kg ===
Competition	Quota(s)	Qualified
Host	1	Chile
2021 Junior Pan American Games	1	Gianella Fernández (PER)
2022 South American Games	2	Ecuador; Brazil
2023 Central American and Caribbean Championship	2	Dominican Republic; Colombia
2023 North American Cup	1	United States
2023 Pan American Championships	2	Canada; Mexico
TOTAL	9	
