= Judo at the Junior Pan American Games =

- Frequency: Every four years
- Inaugurated: 2021
- Most recent: 2025
- Most successful team(s): Brazil

Judo tournaments have been held at the Junior Pan American Games since its first edition in 2021. It currently has a total of 15 events (7 boys tournaments, 7 girls tournaments, and 1 mixed one).

== Summary ==
Games	Year	Venue	Events	Best Nation
I	(Colombia) 2021	Yuri Alvear Combat Arena	15	Brazil
II	(Paraguay) 2025	Olympic Training Centre	15	Brazil

== Medal table ==
Updated after the 2025 Junior Pan American Games.

Rank	Nation	Gold	Silver	Bronze	Total
1	Brazil	18	2	6	26
2	Cuba	3	4	4	11
3	United States	2	6	8	16
4	Venezuela	2	2	7	11
5	Ecuador	2	2	1	5
6	Dominican Republic	1	4	4	9
7	Colombia	1	2	9	12
8	Argentina	1	1	1	3
9	Mexico	0	3	6	9
10	Peru	0	2	4	6
11	Chile	0	1	4	5
12	Canada	0	1	3	4
13	Bahamas	0	0	1	1
13	Guatemala	0	0	1	1
13	Puerto Rico	0	0	1	1
Totals (15 entries)		30	30	60	120
