= Gymnastics at the 2023 Pan American Games – Qualification =

The following is the qualification system and qualified nations for the Gymnastics at the 2023 Pan American Games competition to be held in Santiago, Chile.

== Qualification timeline ==
Event	Date	Venue
2021 Junior Pan American Games	November 26 – December 5	(Colombia) Cali
2023 Pan American Trampoline and Tumbling Championships	May 12–14	(Mexico) Monterrey
2023 Pan American Artistic Gymnastics Championships	May 26–29	(Colombia) Medellín
2023 Pan American Rhythmic Gymnastics Championships	June 9–11	(Mexico) Guadalajara

== Qualification summary ==
- In Artistic Gymnastics, NOCs with 5+ entered gymnasts may also enter the team competition.
- In Trampoline, NOCs with at least 2 entered gymnasts in each gender may also enter each gender's synchronized competition.

Nation	Artistic		Rhythmic		Trampoline		Total
Nation	Men	Women	Individual	Group	Men	Women	Total
Argentina	5	5	2		2	2	16
Barbados		1					1
Bolivia	1	1				1	3
Brazil	5	5	3	5	2	2	22
Canada	5	5	2	5	2	2	21
Chile	5	5	1	5			16
Colombia	5	5	2	5	2	1	20
Costa Rica	1	2	1				4
Cuba	5		1				6
Dominican Republic	2	2			1		5
Ecuador	2	2					4
El Salvador	1	1					2
Independent Athletes Team	1						1
Haiti		1					1
Jamaica	1	1					2
Mexico	5	5	2	5	2	3	22
Panama	1	5					6
Peru	2	1	1				4
Puerto Rico	5	5					10
Trinidad and Tobago	1	1					2
United States	6	6	2	5	2	2	23
Venezuela	2	2	1	5			10
Total: 22 NOCs	61	61	18	35	13	13	201

== Artistic ==
A total of 122 artistic gymnasts (61 per gender) will qualify. The top nine teams in each event qualified five gymnasts each (with one being the host nation Chile). Teams 10-13 each qualified two gymnasts each. A further seven spots were available (per gender) for individual qualification (with a maximum of one quota per gender per nation). The winners of the individual all-around competition at the 2021 Junior Pan American Games also qualified directly for the games. A nation could qualify a maximum five athletes per gender (with the winners of the Junior Pan American Games being an additional number for their respective NOC's).

=== Men ===
Event	Criterion	Qualified	Gymnasts per NOC	Total
2021 Junior Pan American Games	Individual all-around winner	Vahe Petrosyan (USA)	1	1
2023 Pan American Championships	Teams 1–9	United States; Brazil; Colombia; Canada; Mexico; Argentina; Cuba; Puerto Rico; Chile*	5	45
2023 Pan American Championships	Teams places 10–13	Dominican Republic; Peru; Venezuela; Ecuador	2	8
2023 Pan American Championships	Individual all around top 7 countries not already qualified	Jamaica; Panama; Costa Rica; El Salvador; Trinidad and Tobago; Bolivia; Independent Athletes Team	1	7
TOTAL				61

- Chile finished 10th and as host nation was awarded the 9th qualifying team spot.

=== Women ===
Event	Criterion	Qualified	Gymnasts per NOC	Total
2021 Junior Pan American Games	Individual all-around winner	Katelyn Jong (USA)	1	1
2023 Pan American Championship	Teams 1–9	United States; Mexico; Canada; Brazil; Argentina; Puerto Rico; Colombia; Panama; Chile	5	45
2023 Pan American Championship	Teams places 10–13	Ecuador; Costa Rica; Dominican Republic; Venezuela	2	8
2023 Pan American Championship	Individual all around top 7 countries not already qualified	Barbados; Haiti; Peru; Trinidad and Tobago; Jamaica; El Salvador; Bolivia	1	7
TOTAL				61

== Rhythmic ==
The top six nations in the team event at the Pan American Championship qualified two gymnasts. The last four spots went to the top four nations in the individual event, that have not earned any quotas (each with one gymnast). The top six nations in the group event also qualified, with each group consisting of 5 gymnasts. If the host nation has not qualified, an additional six quotas are available (one in individual and five for group). The winner of the individual all-around competition at the 2021 Junior Pan American Games also qualified directly for the games.

=== Individual ===
Event	Gymnasts per NOC	Qualified
2021 Junior Pan American Games	1	Maria Eduarda Alexandre (BRA)
Host NOC	0	—
2023 Pan American Championships – individual event	2	Brazil; United States; Canada; Mexico; Colombia; Argentina
2023 Pan American Championships – individual event	1	Cuba; Chile; Venezuela; Costa Rica
Reallocation	1	Peru
TOTAL	18	

=== Group ===
Event	Gymnasts per NOC	Qualified
Host NOC	0	—
2023 Pan American Championship group event	5	Brazil; Mexico; United States; Venezuela; Canada; Chile
Reallocation	5	Colombia
TOTAL	35	

== Trampoline ==
The winners of the 2021 Junior Pan American Games qualified automatically. The top five countries (determined by the second placing athlete per nation) each qualified two athletes. The last two spots were awarded to the next two best placed nations. The host nation Chile was guaranteed a spot for its best ranked athlete (male or female), if it failed to qualify (only if it competed at the 2023 Pan American Trampoline Championships).

Event	Quotas	Men	Women
2021 Junior Pan American Games	1	Rayan Dutra (BRA)	Mariola Garcia (MEX)
2023 Pan American Championships	10	Brazil; United States; Canada; United States; ~~Brazil~~; Mexico; Canada; Argentina; Mexico; Argentina	Canada; Brazil; United States; United States; Argentina; Canada; Mexico; Mexico; Brazil; Argentina
2023 Pan American Championships	2	Colombia; Dominican Republic; Colombia	Colombia; Bolivia
Total	13		

- Chile did not compete at the qualification tournament and did not receive any quotas.

== See also ==
- Gymnastics at the 2024 Summer Olympics – Qualification
