= Badminton at the 2023 Pan American Games – Qualification =

The following is the qualification system and qualified athletes for the Badminton at the 2023 Pan American Games competitions.

== Qualification system ==
A total of 90 athletes (45 men and 45 women) will qualify to compete at the games. A nation may enter a maximum of four athletes per gender. As host nation, Chile automatically qualified a full team of eights athletes. All other quotas will be awarded through the team world rankings as of May 2, 2023. Each nation's highest ranked athlete/pair's points in each of the five events will be added to determine a country's point total. The top three ranked will qualify eight athletes, the next four countries will qualify six each (three per gender) and the next four after that will qualify four each (two per gender). All other nations will qualify one athlete each, until the quota per gender is reached. The gold medalists in both men’s Singles and the women’s Singles in the 2021 Junior Pan American Games received a direct quota for the Santiago 2023 Pan American Games, which will not be part of the maximum quota specified within the qualification process for these Games.

== Qualification timeline ==
Events	Date	Venue
2021 Junior Pan American Games	November 26–29, 2021	Cali, Colombia
BWF Rankings	May 2, 2023	—N/a

== Qualification summary ==
A total of 23 nations qualified athletes.

NOC	Men	Women	Athletes
Argentina	2	2	4
Barbados	1		1
Bolivia		1	1
Brazil	4	4	8
Canada	5	5	10
Chile	4	4	8
Colombia	1	1	2
Costa Rica	1		1
Cuba	2	2	4
Dominican Republic	2	2	4
Ecuador	1	1	2
El Salvador	3	3	6
Guatemala	3	4	7
Guyana		1	1
Haiti		1	1
Jamaica	2	2	4
Mexico	3	3	6
Paraguay	1		1
Peru	3	3	6
Suriname	1		1
Trinidad and Tobago	1	1	2
United States	4	4	8
Venezuela	1	1	2
Total: 23 NOC's	45	45	90

== Men ==
Event	Quotas per NOC	Total	Men
Host nation	4	4	Chile
2021 Junior Pan American Games	1	1	Brian Yang (CAN)
Teams Ranked 1–3	4	12	Canada; United States; Brazil
Teams Ranked 4–7	3	12	Guatemala; Peru; Mexico; El Salvador
Teams Ranked 8–11	2	8	Dominican Republic; Jamaica; Argentina; Cuba
Teams Ranked 12 and below	1	8	Venezuela; Ecuador; Trinidad and Tobago; Colombia; Costa Rica; Paraguay; Barbados; Suriname
Total		45	

== Women ==
Event	Quotas per NOC	Total	Men
Host nation	4	4	Chile
2021 Junior Pan American Games	1	1	Rachel Chan (CAN)
Teams Ranked 1–4	4	16	Canada; United States; Brazil; Guatemala*
Teams Ranked 5–7	3	9	Peru; Mexico; El Salvador
Teams Ranked 8–11	2	8	Dominican Republic; Jamaica; Argentina; Cuba
Teams Ranked 12 and below	1	5	Venezuela; Ecuador; Trinidad and Tobago; Colombia; Guyana; ~~Aruba~~
Unranked nations	1	2	Bolivia; Haiti
Total		45	

- Guatemala received an additional women's quota after Aruba declined its quota.
