= Roller sports at the 2023 Pan American Games – Qualification =

The following is the qualification system and qualified countries for the Roller sports at the 2023 Pan American Games competition which will be held in Santiago, Chile.

== Qualification ==
A total of 96 roller sports athletes will qualify to compete. 18 will qualify in artistic, 44 in speed skating and 34 in skateboarding. The 2021 Junior Pan American Games and the Pan American Championships for each discipline held in 2022 were used to determine the qualifiers. For skateboarding, the 2023 Olympic World Skateboarding Ranking will be used to determine the qualifiers.

== Qualification timeline ==
Events	Date	Venue
2021 Junior Pan American Games	November 26 – December 4, 2021	(Colombia) Cali
2022 Pan American Artistic Skating Championship	September 1–11, 2022	(Mexico) Cancún
2022 Pan American Speed Skating Championship	September 14–18, 2022	(Colombia) Ibagué
2022 South American Games	October 2–4, 2022	(Paraguay) Asunción
Olympic World Skateboarding Ranking	July 5, 2023	—N/a

== Qualification summary ==
NOC	Figure		Speed		Skateboarding		Total
NOC	Men	Women	Men	Women	Men	Women	Total
Argentina	1	1	2	2	2	2	10
Brazil	1	1	1	1	3	3	10
Canada					2	2	4
Chile	1	1	2	2	2	2	10
Colombia	2	2	3	4	1	2	14
Costa Rica			2				2
Cuba			1	2			3
Dominican Republic	1	1					2
Ecuador			2	2			4
El Salvador			1	1			2
Guatemala				2			2
Mexico	1	1	2	2	1	1	8
Paraguay	1		2				3
Peru					2	1	3
Puerto Rico					2	1	3
United States	1	1	2	2	2	2	10
Uruguay		1				1	2
Venezuela			2	2			4
Total: 18 NOCs	9	9	22	22	17	17	96

== Figure ==
The top seven countries in each event qualified along with hosts Chile, who were given an automatic entrant into each event. A nation could enter a maximum one skater per event. A total of 18 quotas were available (nine per gender). One extra spot per gender was granted to the winners of the 2021 Junior Pan American Games.

Event	Qualified Men	Qualified Women
Host nation	Chile	Chile
2021 Junior Pan American Games	Juan Sebastián Lemus (COL)	Paulina Ruiz (COL)
2022 Pan American Championship	Brazil; Argentina; United States; Colombia; Paraguay; Dominican Republic; Mexico	Argentina; Colombia; United States; Brazil; Uruguay; Mexico; Dominican Republic
TOTAL	9	9

== Speed ==
A total of 44 speed skaters will qualify. Chile as host nation received the maximum quota allocation of four (two men and two women). The remaining 40 spots were allocated using the results of the 2021 Junior Pan American Games, the 2022 Pan American Championship and the 2022 South American Games.

Event	Skaters per NOC	Qualified Men	Qualified Women
Host nation	2	Chile	Chile
2021 Junior Pan American Games	1	Guilherme Rocha (BRA); Juan Mantilla (COL)	Valeria Rodríguez (COL); Gabriela Rueda (COL)
2022 Pan American Championship	2	Argentina; Colombia; Costa Rica; Ecuador; Mexico; United States	Colombia; Cuba; Ecuador; Guatemala; Mexico; United States; Venezuela
2022 Pan American Championship	1	Cuba; El Salvador; Paraguay; Venezuela	Argentina; El Salvador
2022 South American Games	1	Paraguay; Venezuela	Argentina; Brazil
TOTAL		22	22

== Skateboarding ==
A total of 34 skateboarders qualified. Chile as host nation received the maximum quota allocation of four (two men and two women). The remaining 30 spots were allocated using the results of the 2021 Junior Pan American Games and the 2023 World Olympic Rankings.

Park

Event	Qualified Men	Qualified Women
Host nation	Chile	Chile
World Olympic Rankings	United States; Brazil; Puerto Rico; Argentina; Canada; Peru; Mexico	Brazil; United States; Canada; Colombia; Peru; Mexico; Argentina
TOTAL	8	8

Street

Event	Qualified Men	Qualified Women
Host nation	Chile	Chile
2021 Junior Pan American Games	Lucas Rabelo (BRA)	Pâmela Rosa (BRA)
World Olympic Rankings	United States; Brazil; Argentina; Canada; Colombia; Peru; Puerto Rico	Brazil; United States; Colombia; Argentina; Canada; Uruguay; Puerto Rico
TOTAL	9	9
