= Sailing at the 2023 Pan American Games – Qualification =

The following is the qualification system and summary of the sailing at the 2023 Pan American Games competition.

== Qualification system ==
A total of 172 sailors (82 men and 90 women) will qualify to compete at the games. A nation may enter a maximum of one boat in each of the 13 events and a maximum of 19 athletes (nine men and ten women). Each event had different qualifying events that began in 2021. The host nation (Chile) automatically qualified in all 13 events (19 athletes). More women will qualify to compete for the first time ever, after the lightning class switched to a two women and one man format for each boat. The winner of each sailing event at the 2021 Junior Pan American Games, directly qualified as well. Countries earning a spot at the 2021 Junior Pan American Games, can earn another boat in that respective event. The slot awarded at the games is to the athlete, and cannot be transferred to another athlete. A total of four universality quotas were available (two each in the laser and laser radial events).

Original allocation

Event	Host NOC	Cali 2021	Other NOC's	Boats	Athletes
IQFoil men	1	1	7	9	9
Laser men	1	1	15	17	17
49er men	1	—N/a	8	9	18
Sunfish men	1	—N/a	7	8	8
Kites men	1	—N/a	7	8	8
IQFoil women	1	1	7	9	9
Laser women	1	1	15	17	17
49er women	1	—N/a	7	8	16
Sunfish women	1	—N/a	7	8	8
Kites women	1	—N/a	7	8	8
Snipe mixed	1	—N/a	7	8	16
Lightning mixed	1	—N/a	7	8	24
Nacra 17 mixed	1	—N/a	7	8	16
TOTAL	13	4	107	120	172

== Qualification summary ==
A total of 28 countries qualified boats.

Nation	Men					Women					Mixed			Total	
Nation	IQFoil	Laser	49er	Sunfish	Kites	IQFoil	Laser Radial	49erFX	Sunfish	Kites	Snipe	Lightning	Nacra 17	Boats	Athletes
Antigua and Barbuda		X			X									2	2
Argentina	X X	X	X		X	X	X	X	X	X	X	X	X	13	19
Aruba	X	X							X					3	3
Bahamas		X												1	1
Barbados		X												1	1
Belize		X												1	1
Bermuda		X					X							2	2
Brazil	X	X	X		X	X	X	X		X	X	X	X	11	17
British Virgin Islands		X												1	1
Canada		X	X	X	X	X	X	X		X		X	X	10	15
Cayman Islands							X							1	1
Chile	X	X X	X	X	X	X	X		X	X	X	X	X	13	18
Colombia	X				X				X	X				4	4
Cuba		X				X	X		X		X			5	6
Dominican Republic	X			X	X		X							4	4
Ecuador		X										X		2	4
El Salvador		X					X							2	2
Guatemala		X		X			X		X					4	4
Mexico	X		X		X	XX	X		X	X				8	9
Peru		X		X		X	X	X	X		X	X		8	12
Puerto Rico		X		X			X				X			4	5
Saint Lucia		X												1	1
Saint Vincent and the Grenadines							X							1	1
United States	X	X	X	X	X	X	X	X	X	X	X	X	X	13	19
Uruguay			X				XX				X			4	6
Venezuela	X			X		X	X		X			X		6	8
Virgin Islands		X	X											2	3
Total: 27 NOCs	10	21	8	8	9	10	17	5	10	7	8	8	5	128	169

== Qualified boats ==
Some events had their quotas moved to other events.

=== IQFoil men ===
Event	Location	Date	Boats	Qualified
Host nation	—N/a	—N/a	1	Chile
2021 Junior Pan American Games	(Colombia) Cali	December 2–4	1	Marcos Quiroga (ARG)
2022 South American Championship	(Brazil) Búzios	September 1–4	2	Brazil; Argentina
2022 Central American and Caribbean Beach Games	(Colombia) Santa Marta	November 19–26	1	Aruba
2023 US Open Series	(United States) Clearwater	February 2–5	3	United States; Venezuela; Dominican Republic
2023 South American Championship	(Argentina) Mendoza	March 16–19	1	Colombia
Reallocation	—N/a	—N/a	1	Mexico
TOTAL			10	

=== Laser men ===
Event	Location	Date	Boats	Qualified
Host nation	—N/a	—N/a	1	Chile
2021 Junior Pan American Games	(Colombia) Cali	December 2–4	1	Clemente Seguel (CHI)
2022 North American Championship	(Canada) Kingston	June 30–July 4	3	Puerto Rico; United States; Canada
2023 US Open Series	(United States) Clearwater	February 2–5	5	Peru; Guatemala; El Salvador; Ecuador; Bermuda
2023 Central-South American Championship	(Argentina) Buenos Aires	February 15–21	4	Argentina; Brazil; Saint Lucia; Aruba
2023 Central American and Caribbean Games	(El Salvador) San Salvador	June 23–July 8	1	British Virgin Islands
Reallocation	—N/a	—N/a	5	Antigua and Barbuda; Bahamas; Barbados; Cuba; Virgin Islands
Universality	—N/a	—N/a	2	Belize; ~~Saint Vincent and the Grenadines~~
TOTAL			21	

=== 49er men ===
Event	Location	Date	Boats	Qualified
Host nation	—N/a	—N/a	1	Chile
2022 World Championship	(Canada) Halifax	August 31–September 5	2	United States; Uruguay
2022 South American Championship	(Argentina) Buenos Aires	December 8–11	~~2~~ 1	Argentina; ~~Colombia~~
2023 US Open Series	(United States) Clearwater	February 2–5	4	Canada; Mexico; Brazil; Virgin Islands
TOTAL			8	

- Colombia declined its quota

=== Sunfish men ===
Event	Location	Date	Boats	Qualified
Host nation	—N/a	—N/a	1	Chile
2023 Midwinter	(United States) Pensacola	March 29–April 1	3	Peru; United States; Canada
2023 South American Central and Caribbean Championship	(Peru) Paracas	April 24–29	3	Guatemala; Venezuela; Puerto Rico
2023 Central American and Caribbean Games	(El Salvador) San Salvador	June 23–July 8	1	Dominican Republic
TOTAL			8	

=== Kites men ===
Event	Location	Date	Boats	Qualified
Host nation	—N/a	—N/a	1	Chile
2022 Pan American Championship	(Brazil) São Luís	November 7–13	1	Brazil
2022 Central American and Caribbean Beach Games	(Colombia) Santa Marta	November 19–26	1	Antigua and Barbuda
2023 US Open Series	(United States) Clearwater	February 2–5	3	United States; Mexico; Canada
2023 Pan American Championship	(Dominican Republic) Cabarete	March 6–12	2	Dominican Republic; Argentina
Reallocation	—N/a	—N/a	1	Colombia
TOTAL			9	

=== IQFoil women ===
Event	Location	Date	Boats	Qualified
Host nation	—N/a	—N/a	1	Chile
2021 Junior Pan American Games	(Colombia) Cali	December 2–4	1	Mariana Aguilar Chávez (MEX)
2022 South American Championship	(Brazil) Búzios	September 1–4	2	Peru; Brazil
2023 US Open Series	(United States) Clearwater	February 2–5	3	United States; Mexico; Canada
2023 South American Championship	(Argentina) Mendoza	March 16–19	2	Argentina; Venezuela
Reallocation	—N/a	—N/a	1	Cuba
TOTAL			10	

=== Laser radial women ===
Event	Location	Date	Boats	Qualified
Host nation	—N/a	—N/a	1	Chile
2021 Junior Pan American Games	(Colombia) Cali	December 2–4	1	Dolores Fraschini (URU)
2022 North American Championship	(Canada) Kingston	June 30–July 4	3	Mexico; Bermuda; Canada
2023 US Open Series	(United States) Clearwater	February 2–5	5	United States; Peru; Cayman Islands; Guatemala; Venezuela
2023 Central-South American Championship	(Argentina) Buenos Aires	February 15–21	4	Argentina; Brazil; Cuba; Uruguay
2023 Central American and Caribbean Games	(El Salvador) San Salvador	June 23–July 8	1	Puerto Rico
Reallocation	—N/a	—N/a	~~3~~ 2	~~Antigua and Barbuda~~; Dominican Republic; El Salvador
Universality	—N/a	—N/a	~~2~~ 1	Saint Vincent and the Grenadines; ~~Trinidad and Tobago~~
TOTAL			17	

=== 49er FX women ===
Event	Location	Date	Boats	Qualified
Host nation	—N/a	—N/a	~~1~~0	—N/a
2022 World Championship	(Canada) Halifax	August 31–September 5	3	United States; Brazil; Canada
World Ranking	—N/a	—N/a	2	Argentina; Peru
TOTAL			5	

- Chile declined its host quota
- One quota (two athlete spots) was reallocated to other events.

=== Sunfish women ===
Event	Location	Date	Boats	Qualified
Host nation	—N/a	—N/a	1	Chile
2023 Midwinter	(United States) Pensacola	March 30–April 1	3	Peru; United States; Venezuela
2023 South American Central and Caribbean Championship	(Peru) Paracas	April 24–29	3	Argentina; Guatemala; Cuba
2023 Central American and Caribbean Games	(El Salvador) San Salvador	June 23–July 8	1	Colombia
Reallocation	—N/a	—N/a	2	Aruba; Mexico
TOTAL			10	

=== Kites women ===
Event	Location	Date	Boats	Qualified
Host nation	—N/a	—N/a	1	Chile
2022 Pan American Championship	(Brazil) São Luís	November 7–13	1	Brazil
2023 US Open Series	(United States) Clearwater	February 2–5	3	United States; Argentina; Colombia
2023 Pan American Championship	(Dominican Republic) Cabarete	March 6–12	~~3~~ 2	Canada; Mexico
TOTAL			7	

=== Snipe mixed ===
Event	Location	Date	Boats	Qualified
Host nation	—N/a	—N/a	1	Chile
2022 North American Championship	(Canada) Toronto	September 9–11	2	Puerto Rico; United States
2023 Western Hemisphere & Asian Championship	(Chile) Algarrobo	March 14–19	2	Brazil; Argentina
2023 South American Championship	(Uruguay) Montevideo	April 4–9	2	Peru; Uruguay
2023 Central American and Caribbean Games	(El Salvador) San Salvador	June 23–July 8	1	Cuba
TOTAL			8	

=== Lightning mixed ===
Event	Location	Date	Boats	Qualified
Host nation	—N/a	—N/a	1	Chile
2022 World Championship	(United States) Wrightsville Beach	May 16–21	~~1~~ 2	Argentina; Canada
2022 North American Championship	(United States) Long Island	September 14–18	2	United States; Ecuador
2023 South American Championship	(Brazil) Guaratuba	December 3–7	2	Brazil; Peru
2023 Pacific Cup	(Chile) Algarrobo	April 6–9	~~2~~ 1	Venezuela
TOTAL			8	

- Only one boat was eligible at the 2023 Pacific Cup, the last spot was reallocated to Canada, the next best team at the 2022 Worlds.

=== Nacra 17 mixed ===
Event	Location	Date	Boats	Qualified
Host nation	—N/a	—N/a	1	Chile
2022 World Championship	(Canada) Halifax	August 31–September 5	4	Argentina; United States; Brazil; Canada
TOTAL			5	

- One quota (two athlete spots) was reallocated to other events.
