= Artistic skating at the 2021 Junior Pan American Games =

- Artistic skating pictograms
- Venue: Velódromo Alcides Nieto Patiño
- Dates: 3–4 December
- Competitors: 15 from 10 nations

Artistic skating competitions at the 2021 Junior Pan American Games in Cali, Colombia were held from 3 to 4 December 2021. It had a total of 2 events, one for each gender.

== Medal summary ==
=== Medal table ===
* Host nation (Colombia)

Rank	Nation	Gold	Silver	Bronze	Total
1	Colombia*	2	0	0	2
2	Argentina	0	1	1	2
2	Brazil	0	1	1	2
Totals (3 entries)		2	2	2	6

== Medalists ==
Event	Gold	Silver	Bronze
Boys freestyle	Juan Sebastián Lemus; Colombia	Erik Medziukeviciu; Brazil	Tomas Roman Masia; Argentina
Girls freestyle	Paulina Ruiz; Colombia	Martina Della Chiesa; Argentina	Bruna Wurts; Brazil
