= Victor Alcará =

Brazilian swimmer (born 2000)

Personal information
- Full name: Victor Guimarães Alcará
- Nationality: Brazilian
- Born: 28 September 2000 (age 25) São João da Boa Vista, São Paulo, Brazil
- Height: 1.92 m (6 ft 4 in)
- Weight: 84 kg (185 lb)

Sport
- Sport: Swimming
- Strokes: Freestyle
Medal record
Men's swimming
Representing Brazil
Pan American Games
Gold medal – first place	2023 Santiago	4×100 m freestyle
Gold medal – first place	2023 Santiago	4×100 m mixed free
Silver medal – second place	2023 Santiago	4×100 m medley

Victor Guimarães Alcará (born 2000 in São João da Boa Vista) is a Brazilian swimmer.

He began his career in 2010, at the age of 10, when he started training in his hometown. In 2017 he went to Corinthians and in 2023 he was hired by Esporte Clube Pinheiros.

At the 2021 Junior Pan American Games he won three gold medals in the 100m freestyle and 4 × 100 m freestyle and 4 × 100 m mixed freestyle relays, as well as a silver in the 4 × 100 m medley relay. With this, he won a direct place for the Pan American Games in Santiago 2023 in the 50m freestyle.

At the 2021 South American Swimming Championships, he won a gold medal in the 4 × 100 m metre freestyle relay.

He was at the 2023 World Aquatics Championships, where he finished 6th in the Men's 4 × 100 metre freestyle relay

At the 2023 Pan American Games, he won two gold medals in the men's 4 × 100 m freestyle and mixed 4 × 100 m freestyle relays of Brazil. He also finished 5th in the 50 metre freestyle, with a time of 22.27.
