= Canada at the 2021 Junior Pan American Games =

- IOC code: CAN
- NOC: Canadian Olympic Committee
- Website: www.olympic.ca

in Cali–Valle, Colombia 25 November–5 December, 2021
- Competitors: 31 in 10 sports
- Flag bearers (opening): Brian Yang; Aurélie Tran
- Flag bearers (closing): Remi Aubin; Yamina Lahyanssa
- Medals Ranked 14th: Gold 4 Silver 1 Bronze 5 Total 10

Junior Pan American Games appearances (overview)
- 2021; 2025

Canada is scheduled to compete at the 2021 Junior Pan American Games in Cali–Valle, Colombia from November 25 to December 5, 2021.

Canada's full team of 31 athletes (13 men and 18 women) competing in ten sports was announced on November 19, 2021. Along with the announcement, artistic gymnast Aurélie Tran and badminton athlete Brian Yang were named as co-flag bearers during the opening ceremony.

Trampolinist Remi Aubin and gold medal winning karateka Yamina Lahyanssa were named as co-flag bearers during the closing ceremony. Canadian athletes won a total of ten medals in six sports.

== Competitors ==
The following is the list of number of competitors (per gender) participating at the games per sport/discipline.

Sport	Men	Women	Total
Badminton	1	1	2
Beach volleyball	0	2	2
Diving	1	2	3
Gymnastics	2	2	4
Karate	1	3	4
Modern pentathlon	1	1	2
Squash	3	3	6
Table tennis	1	1	2
Taekwondo	1	1	2
Wrestling	2	2	4
Total	13	18	31

== Medallists ==
Medal	Name	Sport	Event	Date
Gold	Brian Yang; Rachel Chan	Badminton	Mixed doubles	November 29
Gold	Rachel Chan	Badminton	Women's singles	November 29
Gold	Brian Yang	Badminton	Men's singles	November 29
Gold	Yamina Lahyanssa	Karate	Women's 50 kg	December 5
Silver	Aurélie Tran	Gymnastics	Women's uneven bars	November 28
Bronze	Nicholas Hoefling	Taekwondo	Men's 58 kg	November 26
Bronze	Aurélie Tran	Gymnastics	Women's artistic individual all-around	November 27
Bronze	Hannah Blatt; Sydney Maxwell; Iman Shaheen	Squash	Women's team	November 30
Bronze	Jeremy Hazin; Sophie Gauthier	Table tennis	Mixed doubles	December 1
Bronze	Jeremy Hazin	Table tennis	Men's singles	December 2

== Badminton ==
Canada qualified two badminton athletes (one male and one female). Canada went on to sweep all three gold medals.

Athlete	Event	Round of 64	Round of 32	Round of 16	Quarterfinals	Semifinals	Final	Rank
Athlete	Event	Opposition Result	Opposition Result	Opposition Result	Opposition Result	Opposition Result	Opposition Result	Rank
Brian Yang	Men's singles	Bye	Huebla (ECU); W 2–0 (21–5, 21–6)	Roque (PER); W 2–0 (21–8, 21–15)	Averia (USA); W 2–0 (21–12, 21–4)	Matias (BRA); W 2–1 (14–21, 21–16, 21–18)	Canjura (ESA); W 2–0 (21–8, 21–6)	1st place, gold medalist(s)
Rachel Chan	Women's singles	—N/a	Hernandez (ESA); W 2–0 (21–2, 21–5)	Acosta (DOM); W 2–0 (21–5, 21–7)	Gai (USA); W 2–0 (21–19, 21–15)	Vieira (BRA); W 2–0 (21–8, 21–9)	Chi (USA); W 2–1 (14–21, 21–5, 21–15)	1st place, gold medalist(s)
Brian Yang; Rachel Chan	Mixed doubles	—N/a	Bye	Jiménez / Vega (CRC); W 2–0 (21–5, 21–3)	Martínez / Paiz (GUA); W 2–0 (21–12, 21–12)	Matias / Lima (BRA); W 2–0 (21–15, 21–12)	Canjura / Centeno (ESA); W 2–0 (21–13, 21–14)	1st place, gold medalist(s)

== Beach volleyball ==
Canada qualified a women's beach volleyball pair.

Women

- Kaylee Glagau
- Becky Tresham

== Diving ==
Canada qualified three divers (one male and two females).

Men

- Ben Smyth

Women

- Julianne Boisvert
- Quinn Gariepy

== Gymnastics ==
Canada qualified four gymnasts (two per gender).

=== Artistic ===
Canada qualified two artistic gymnasts (one per gender).

Men

- Mathys Jalbert

Women

- Aurélie Tran

=== Trampoline ===
Canada qualified two trampolinists (one per gender).

Men

- Remi Aubin

Women

- Gabriella Flynn

== Karate ==
Canada qualified four karatekas (one male and three female).

Men

- Émile Desrosiers

Women

- Kristin Dixon
- Yamina Lahyanssa
- Megan Rochette

== Modern pentathlon ==
Canada qualified two modern pentathletes (one per gender).

Men

- Quinn Schulz

Women

- Olivia Li

== Squash ==
Canada qualified six squash athletes (three per gender).

Men

- Noel Heaton
- Elliott Hunt
- Ryan Picken

Women

- Hannah Blatt
- Sydney Maxwell
- Iman Shaheen

== Table tennis ==
Canada qualified two table tennis athletes (one per gender).

Men

- Jeremy Hazin

Women

- Sophie Gauthier

== Taekwondo ==
Canada qualified two taekwondo practitioners (one per gender).

Athlete	Event	Round of 16	Quarterfinals	Semifinals	Final	Rank
Athlete	Event	Opposition Result	Opposition Result	Opposition Result	Opposition Result	Rank
Nicholas Hoefling	Men's 58 kg	Bye	Cazeau (HAI); W 20–0	Garrido (COL); L 3–9	Did not advance	3rd place, bronze medalist(s)
Josipa Kafadar	Women's 49 kg	Bye	Saldaña (COL); L 6–9	Did not advance		

== Wrestling ==
Canada qualified four wrestlers (two per gender).

Men

- Jason-Guy Luneau
- Dechlan Papadopoulos

Women

- Nyla Burgess
- Bronwyn MacGregor
