= Taekwondo at the 2021 Junior Pan American Games =

- Taekwondo pictogram
- Venue: Coliseo de Hockey en Línea Miguel Calero
- Dates: 26–27 November
- Competitors: 65 from 23 nations

Taekwondo competitions at the 2021 Junior Pan American Games in Cali, Colombia, were held at the Coliseo de Hockey en Línea Miguel Calero on November 26 and 27, 2021.

8 medal events were contested (four per gender).

== Medal table ==
* Host nation (Colombia)

Rank	Nation	Gold	Silver	Bronze	Total
1	Mexico	3	1	1	5
2	United States	3	0	2	5
3	Brazil	1	0	2	3
4	Colombia*	1	0	1	2
5	Argentina	0	3	0	3
6	Chile	0	1	2	3
7	Nicaragua	0	1	0	1
7	Peru	0	1	0	1
7	Puerto Rico	0	1	0	1
10	Ecuador	0	0	2	2
11	Bolivia	0	0	1	1
11	Canada	0	0	1	1
11	Costa Rica	0	0	1	1
11	Guatemala	0	0	1	1
11	Honduras	0	0	1	1
11	Uruguay	0	0	1	1
Totals (16 entries)		8	8	16	32

== Medalists ==
=== Boys ===
Event	Gold	Silver	Bronze
58 kg	Jhon Garrido; Colombia	Jose Acuña; Argentina	Nicholas Hoefling; Canada
58 kg	Jhon Garrido; Colombia	Jose Acuña; Argentina	Melvy Alvarez; United States
68 kg	Uriel Ballesteros; Mexico	Cristián Olivero; Chile	Diego Monney; Guatemala
68 kg	Uriel Ballesteros; Mexico	Cristián Olivero; Chile	Jose Preciado; Ecuador
80 kg	CJ Nickolas; United States	David Robleto; Nicaragua	Joaquin Martinez; Chile
80 kg	CJ Nickolas; United States	David Robleto; Nicaragua	Henique Fernandes; Brazil
+80 kg	Dallas Parker; United States	Juan Esquivel Ramirez; Mexico	Patrik Cardoso; Brazil
+80 kg	Dallas Parker; United States	Juan Esquivel Ramirez; Mexico	Daniel Martínez Pavón; Honduras

=== Girls ===
Event	Gold	Silver	Bronze
49 kg	Angie Rodriguez; Mexico	Giulia Sendra; Argentina	Maria Yzaguirre; Costa Rica
49 kg	Angie Rodriguez; Mexico	Giulia Sendra; Argentina	Maria Boccarato; Uruguay
57 kg	Sandy Macedo; Brazil	Gianna Ortiz; Puerto Rico	Maria Lara; Bolivia
57 kg	Sandy Macedo; Brazil	Gianna Ortiz; Puerto Rico	María Lozano; Colombia
67 kg	Leslie Soltero; Mexico	Eliana Mendoza; Peru	Britney Morales; United States
67 kg	Leslie Soltero; Mexico	Eliana Mendoza; Peru	Mell Mina; Ecuador
+67 kg	Alena Viana; United States	Gianella Evolo; Argentina	Francisca Torres; Chile
+67 kg	Alena Viana; United States	Gianella Evolo; Argentina	Paloma Moctezuma; Mexico
