= Judo at the 2023 Pan American Games – Men's 100 kg =

Judo Men's 100 kg at the 2023 Pan American Games
- Venue: Contact Sports Center
- Location: Santiago, Chile
- Date: October 30
- Competitors: 11 from 10 nations
- Website: Official website

Medalists
gold medal	Shady Elnahas (1st title)	Canada
silver medal	Thomas Briceño	Chile
bronze medal	Kayo Santos	Brazil
bronze medal	Francisco Balanta	Colombia

Competition at external databases
- Links: IJF

The men's 100 kg competition of the judo events at the 2023 Pan American Games was held on 30 October at the Contact Sports Center (Centro de Entrenamiento de los Deportes de Contacto) in Santiago, Chile. A total of 11 athletes from 10 NOC's competed.

== Schedule ==
All times are local (UTC−3)

Date	Time	Event
Monday, 30 October 2023	10:00	Elimination round of 16
Monday, 30 October 2023	10:00	Quarterfinals
Monday, 30 October 2023	11:00	Repechage
Monday, 30 October 2023	11:00	Semifinals
Monday, 30 October 2023	15:00	Finals

== Results ==
=== Main Bracket ===
Round of 16
Daryl Yamamoto (PER)	00 (yellow card)
Liester Cardona (CUB)	11
Nathaniel Keeve (USA)	10 (yellow card)
Ivo Dargoltz (ARG)	00
Alexis Esquivel (MEX)	00
Kayo Santos (BRA)	10

Quarter-finals
Leonardo Gonçalves (BRA)	10
Liester Cardona (CUB)	00 (yellow card)
Shady El Nahas (CAN)	10 (yellow card)
Nathaniel Keeve (USA)	00
Thomas Briceño (CHI)	11
Junior Angulo (ECU)	00 (yellow card)
Francisco Balanta (COL)	00 (yellow card)
Kayo Santos (BRA)	10 (yellow card)

Semi-finals
Leonardo Gonçalves (BRA)	00 (yellow card)
Shady El Nahas (CAN)	10 (yellow card)
Thomas Briceño (CHI)	10 (yellow card)
Kayo Santos (BRA)	00

Gold medal contest
Shady El Nahas (CAN)	10 (yellow card)
Thomas Briceño (CHI)	00

=== Repechage ===
Repechage
Liester Cardona (CUB)	10 (yellow card)
Nathaniel Keeve (USA)	00
Junior Angulo (ECU)	00
Francisco Balanta (COL)	10

Bronze medal contests
Liester Cardona (CUB)	00
Kayo Santos (BRA)	10
Francisco Balanta (COL)	01
Leonardo Gonçalves (BRA)	00
