= Swimming at the 2021 Junior Pan American Games =

- Swimming pictograms
- Venue: Aquatics Centre (Swimming); Laguna Bujama (Open water swimming)
- Dates: 26 – 30 November
- Competitors: 272

The swimming competitions at the 2021 Junior Pan American Games in Cali took place 26 to 30 November 2021.

== Events ==
Similar to the program's format in 2015, swimming features a total of 36 events (17 each for men and women and 2 mixed). The following events will be contested (all pool events are long course, and distances are in metres unless stated):

- Freestyle: 50, 100, 200, 400, 800, and 1,500;
- Backstroke: 100 and 200;
- Breaststroke: 100 and 200;
- Butterfly: 100 and 200;
- Individual medley: 200 and 400;
- Relays: 4×100 free (including mixed), 4×200 free, 4×100 medley (including mixed)

== Medal summary ==
=== Medal table ===
* Host nation (Colombia)

Rank	Nation	Gold	Silver	Bronze	Total
1	Brazil	19	15	6	40
2	Mexico	5	7	2	14
3	Colombia*	3	5	12	20
4	Argentina	3	4	4	11
5	Aruba	2	1	0	3
6	Guatemala	1	2	3	6
7	Venezuela	1	1	3	5
8	Chile	1	0	1	2
9	Uruguay	1	0	0	1
10	Ecuador	0	1	1	2
10	Paraguay	0	1	1	2
12	Barbados	0	0	1	1
12	Costa Rica	0	0	1	1
12	Panama	0	0	1	1
Totals (14 entries)		36	37	36	109

=== Medalists ===
==== Men's events ====
Event	Gold		Silver		Bronze	
50 m freestyle	Victor Alcará; Brazil	22.08	Lucas Peixoto; Brazil	22.34	Camilo Marrugo; Colombia	22.92
100 m freestyle	Breno Correia; Brazil	49.33	Lucas Peixoto; Brazil	49.71	Andres Dupont; Mexico	50.37
200 m freestyle	Breno Correia; Brazil	1:47.46	Juan Morales; Colombia	1:49.70	Santiago Corredor; Colombia	1:49.80
400 m freestyle	Santiago Corredor; Colombia	3:53.14	Eduardo Oliveira de Moraes; Brazil	3:53.23	Juan Morales; Colombia	3:57.26
800 m freestyle	Juan Morales; Colombia	8:01.04	Stephan Steverink; Brazil	8:02.64	Guilherme Sperandio; Brazil	8:12.74
1500 m freestyle	Pedro Guastelli Farias; Brazil	15:24.27	Juan Morales; Colombia	15:31.20	Stephan Steverink; Brazil	15:34.41
100 m backstroke	Diego Camacho; Mexico	55.38	Patrick Groters; Aruba	55.75	Jack Stewart Kirby; Barbados	56.18
200 m backstroke	Patrick Groters; Aruba	2:01.78	Diego Camacho; Mexico	2:02.29	Erick Gordillo Guzmán; Guatemala	2:03.00
100 m breaststroke	Mariano Lazzerini Angeli; Chile	1:02.28	Andres Bustamante; Mexico	1:02.29	Bernhrd Tyler Christianson; Panama	1:03.16
200 m breaststroke	Andre Puente; Mexico	2:14.85	Juan Bautista Carrocia; Argentina	2:16.78	Roberto Bonilla Flores; Guatemala	2:17.18
100 m butterfly	Kayky Mota; Brazil	52.81	Matheus Gonche; Brazil	52.83	Jorge Otaiza Hernandez; Venezuela	53.76
200 m butterfly	Matheus Gonche; Brazil	1:59.63	Roberto Bonilla Flores; Guatemala	2:01.08	Kayky Mota; Brazil	2:01.60
200 m individual medley	Patrick Groters; Aruba	2:02.09	Erick Gordillo Guzmán; Guatemala	2:02.47	Matheo Mateos Mongelos; Paraguay	2:04.53
400 m individual medley	Erick Gordillo Guzmán; Guatemala	4:22.09	Stephan Steverink; Brazil	4:24.35	Roberto Bonilla Flores; Guatemala	4:26.08
4 × 100 m freestyle relay	Brazil; Victor Baganha; Lucas Peixoto; Victor Alcará; Breno Correia	3:17.14	Mexico; Alberto Gomez; Diego Camacho Salgado; Guillermo Cruz; Andres Dupont; Ariel Molina Macias^{[a]} Mariano Jasso Escoto^{[a]} Carlos Kossio Mendez^{[a]}	3:24.02	Colombia; Juan Morales; Alejandro Libreros; Santiago Corredor; Santiago Aguilera; Camilo Marrugo^{[a]} Juan Pablo Collazos^{[a]}	3:24.40
4 × 200 m freestyle relay	Brazil; Breno Correia; Lucas Peixoto; Eduardo Oliveira de Moraes; Stephan Steverink	7:24.22	Colombia; Alejandro Libreros; Santiago Aguilera; Juan Morales; Santiago Corredor	7:30.01	Chile; Benjamin Schnapp; Gabriel Araya; Eduardo Cisternas; Mariano Lazzerini	7:32.66
4 × 100 m medley relay	Mexico; Andres Cabrera; Andres Puente; Ascanio Pinto; Diego Camacho	3:42.67	Brazil; Ney Chagas Filho; Stephan Steverink; Kayky Mota; Breno Correia; Matheus Gonche^{[a]} Victor Alcará^{[a]} Victor Baganha^{[a]}	3:44.19	Colombia; Anthony Rincón; Camilo Marrugo; Juan García; Santiago Aguilera; Brian Uribe^{[a]} Diego Molinares^{[a]} Sebastian Aguirre^{[a]} Sebastian Calle Ospina^{[a]}	3:46.19

^{a} Swimmers who participated in the heats only and received medals.

==== Women's events ====
Event	Gold		Silver		Bronze	
50 m freestyle	Stephanie Balduccini; Brazil	25.47	Deyse Barbosa; Brazil Anicka Delgado; Ecuador	25.74	none awarded	
100 m freestyle	Stephanie Balduccini; Brazil	54.63	Ana Carolina Vieira; Brazil	55.89	Anicka Delgado; Ecuador	56.32
200 m freestyle	Ana Carolina Vieira; Brazil	2:02.15	Maria Victoria Yegres; Venezuela	2:02.16	Karen Durango; Colombia	2:03.09
400 m freestyle	Maria Paula Heitmann; Brazil	4:17.64	Lucia Gauna; Argentina	4:19.14	Maria Victoria Yegres; Venezuela Delfina Dini; Argentina	4:19.24
800 m freestyle	Maria Victoria Yegres; Venezuela	8:50.81	Beatriz Dizotti; Brazil	8:52.35	Delfina Dini; Argentina	8:58.66
1500 m freestyle	Beatriz Dizotti; Brazil	16:52.11	Delfina Dini; Argentina	17:04.17	Maria Victoria Yegres; Venezuela	17:06.02
100 m backstroke	Tayde de la Fuente; Mexico	1:02.00	Julia Góes; Brazil	1:02.82	Celia Pulido Ortiz; Mexico	1:03.24
200 m backstroke	Athena Kovacs; Mexico	2:15.64	Jimena Leguizamón; Colombia	2:16.85	Fernanda de Goeij; Brazil	2:17.94
100 m breaststroke	Martina Barbeito; Argentina	1:08.74	Giulia Oliveira; Brazil	1:10.24	Bruna Leme; Brazil	1:10.27
200 m breaststroke	Martina Barbeito; Argentina	2:30.17	Bruna Leme; Brazil	2:31.15	Maria Alborzen; Argentina	2:32.21
100 m butterfly	Clarissa Rodrigues; Brazil	1:00.19	Luana Alonso; Paraguay	1:00.30	Valentina Becerra; Colombia	1:00.82
200 m butterfly	Karen Durango; Colombia	2:13.51	Rafaela Raurich; Brazil	2:14.58	Samantha Baños; Colombia	2:15.90
200 m individual medley	Nicole Frank; Uruguay	2:17.46	Maria Selene Alborzen; Argentina	2:18.99	Fernanda de Goeij; Brazil	2:19.32
400 m individual medley	Maria Selene Alborzen; Argentina	4:52.22	Fernanda de Goeij; Brazil	4:55.13	Yanin Ortiz Roman; Costa Rica	4:57.14
4 × 100 m freestyle relay	Brazil; Ana Carolina Vieira; Clarissa Rodrigues; Fernanda Celidônio; Stephanie Balduccini	3:45.06	Mexico; Athena Meneses; Tayde de la Fuente; Celia Pulido Ortiz; Susana Hernandez Barradas	3:49.97	Colombia; Stefanía Gómez; Samantha Baños; Karen Durango; Bárbara Muñoz	3:51.05
4 × 200 m freestyle relay	Brazil; Maria Paula Heitmann; Stephanie Balduccini; Rafaela Raurich; Ana Carolina Vieira	8:17.19	Colombia; Karen Durango; Manuela Libreros; Stefanía Gómez; Bárbara Muñoz	8:23.72	Argentina; Candela Giordanino; Mainque Mujica; Delfina Dini; Lucia Gauna	8:25.44
4 × 100 m medley relay	Brazil; Julia Góes; Giulia Carvalho; Clarissa Rodrigues; Stephanie Balduccini	4:11.04	Mexico; Tayde de la Fuente; Mariana Ortega Gil; Athena Meneses; Susana Hernandez Barradas	4:15.44	Colombia; Jimena Leguizamón; Camila Agudelo; Valentina Becerra; Bárbara Muñoz	4:16.51

^{b} Swimmers who participated in the heats only and received medals.

==== Mixed ====
Event	Gold		Silver		Bronze	
4 × 100 m freestyle relay	Brazil; Victor Alcará (49.50); Breno Correia (48.93); Stephanie Balduccini (54.74); Ana Carolina Vieira (56.25); Victor Baganha^{[a]} Lucas Peixoto^{[a]} Clarissa Rodrigues^{[a]} Fernanda Celidônio^{[a]}	3:29.42	Mexico; Andres Cabrera; Guillermo Cruz; Susana Hernandez Barradas; Tayde de la Fuente	3:35.02	Colombia; Santiago Aguilera; Santiago Corredor; Stefanía Gómez; Bárbara Muñoz; Alejandro Libreros^{[a]} Juan Pablo Collazos^{[a]}	3:35.94
4 × 100 m medley relay	Brazil; Ney Lima Filho; Giulia Carvalho; Kayky Mota; Ana Carolina Vieira; Victor Baganha^{[a]} Bruna Leme^{[a]} Matheus Gonche^{[a]} Stephanie Balduccini^{[a]}	3:55.34	Mexico; Diego Camacho Salgado; Andreas Puente Bustamante; Athena Meneses Kovacs; Tayde de la Fuente; Ariel Molina Macias^{[a]} Mariana Ortega Gil^{[a]} Ascanio Pinto^{[a]} Susana Hernandez Barradas^{[a]}	3:56.33	Colombia; Anthony Rincón; Juan García; Valentina Becerra; Bárbara Muñoz; Brian Uribe^{[a]} Samuel Bendeck^{[a]} Samantha Baños^{[a]}	3:58.11

== Qualification ==
A total of 272 swimmers will qualify in the pool. As Host Country, Colombia automatically will qualify 14 male and 14 female competitors in the pool. Each National Olympic Committee (NOC) may use proven swim times attained during the qualification period of those swimmers who have met the qualifying standards established by the UANA for the 2021 Junior Pan American Games at a competition recognized by the FINA. Each event (besides the relays) have an A standard (two entries allowed) or a B standard (one entry allowed). Countries not qualified can enter one male and one female swimmer through the universality rule.

=== Qualification system ===
A total of 272 swimmers will qualify. As Host Country, Colombia automatically will qualify 14 male and 14 female competitors in the pool. Each National Olympic Committee (NOC) may use proven swim times attained during the qualification period of those swimmers who have met the qualifying standards established by the UANA for the 2021 Junior Pan American Games at a competition recognized by the FINA. Each event (besides the relays) have an A standard (two entries allowed) or a B standard (one entry allowed). Countries not qualified can enter one male and one female swimmer through the universality rule.

=== Swimming qualification times ===
The time standards (all long course) for the 2019 Pan American Games are:

Male		Event	Female	
A standard (2 entries)	B standard (1 entry)	Event	A standard (2 entries)	B standard (1 entry)
23,02	24,38	50 freestyle	26,28	27,83
50.55	53.54	100 freestyle	57.41	1:00.80
1:51.30	1:57.88	200 freestyle	2:05.40	2:12.82
3:57.96	4:12.02	400 freestyle	4:20.76	4:36.18
8:17.44	8:46.85	800 freestyle	8:58.95	9:30.81
15:57.51	16:54.11	1500 freestyle	17:06.05	18:06.71
57.34	1:00.73	100 backstroke	1:04.31	1:08.11
2:04.73	2:12.11	200 backstroke	2:20.53	2:28.83
1:03.19	1:06.93	100 breaststroke	1:12.18	1:16.44
2:19.58	2:27.93	200 breaststroke	2:36.75	2:46.01
54.54	57.76	100 butterfly	1:02.17	1:05.84
2:02.35	2:09.58	200 butterfly	2:16.14	2:24.19
2:06.30	2:13.76	200 individual medley	2:22.09	2:30.49
4:31.71	4:47.77	400 individual medley	5:02.46	5:20.34

=== Swimming ===
A total of 37 countries qualified swimmers or received universality spots. Only 326 of 350 quota spots were distributed. A total of 167 male swimmers and 159 swimmers were entered.

NOC	Men	Women	Athletes
Colombia	14	14	28
Total: 1 NOC's	136	136	272

== Participation ==
=== Participating nations ===
Athletes from—nations competed in swimming at the 2021 Junior Pan American Games

== See also ==
- Swimming at the 2021 Junior Pan American Games
- Swimming at the 2020 Summer Olympics
- Swimming at the Pan American Games
