= Skateboarding at the 2021 Junior Pan American Games =

- Skateboarding pictograms
- Venue: Skate Park Calida
- Dates: 26 November
- Competitors: 18 from 11 nations

Skateboarding competitions at the 2021 Junior Pan American Games in Cali, Colombia were held on 26 November 2021. It had a total of two events: one for each gender.

== Medal summary ==
=== Medal table ===
* Host nation (Colombia)

Rank	Nation	Gold	Silver	Bronze	Total
1	Brazil	2	0	0	2
2	Mexico	0	1	0	1
2	Peru	0	1	0	1
4	Colombia*	0	0	1	1
4	United States	0	0	1	1
Totals (5 entries)		2	2	2	6

== Medalists ==
Event	Gold	Silver	Bronze
Boys' street	Lucas Rabelo; Brazil	Ángelo Caro; Peru	Juan Polania; Colombia
Girls' street	Pâmela Rosa; Brazil	Itzel Granados; Mexico	Poe Pinson; United States
