= Table tennis at the 2021 Junior Pan American Games =

- Table tennis pictogram
- Venue: Coliseo Blanco Multifuncional 1
- Dates: 30 November - 5 December
- Competitors: 70 from 22 nations

Table tennis competitions at the 2021 Junior Pan American Games in Cali, Colombia were held from November 30 until December 5, 2021 at the Coliseo Blanco Multifuncional 1 in Palmira, Valle del Cauca.

== Medal summary ==
=== Medal table ===
* Host nation (Colombia)

Rank	Nation	Gold	Silver	Bronze	Total
1	Brazil	2	2	2	6
2	Mexico	1	3	0	4
3	Cuba	1	1	5	7
4	Puerto Rico	1	1	1	3
5	Chile	1	0	1	2
6	Argentina	1	0	0	1
7	Canada	0	0	2	2
7	United States	0	0	2	2
9	Ecuador	0	0	1	1
Totals (9 entries)		7	7	14	28

== Medalists ==
Event	Gold	Silver	Bronze
Men's Individual	Santiago Lorenzo; Argentina	Angel Naranjo; Puerto Rico	Jeremy Hazin; Canada
Men's Individual	Santiago Lorenzo; Argentina	Angel Naranjo; Puerto Rico	Eday Goméz; Cuba
Men's doubles	Puerto Rico; Angel Naranjo; Derek Valentin	Cuba; Eday Goméz; Rene Mendez	Brazil; Diogo Silva; Rafael Turrini
Men's doubles	Puerto Rico; Angel Naranjo; Derek Valentin	Cuba; Eday Goméz; Rene Mendez	Ecuador; Diego Piguave; Neycer Robalino
Men's Team	Chile; Nicolas Burgos; Andres Martinez	Brazil; Diogo Silva; Rafael Turrini	Cuba; Rene Mendez; Eday Goméz
Men's Team	Chile; Nicolas Burgos; Andres Martinez	Brazil; Diogo Silva; Rafael Turrini	United States; Jayden Zhou; Sid Naresh
Women's Individual	Daniela Fonseca; Cuba	Arantxa Cossio Aceves; Mexico	Giulia Takahashi; Brazil
Women's Individual	Daniela Fonseca; Cuba	Arantxa Cossio Aceves; Mexico	Valentina Rios; Chile
Women's doubles	Mexico; Clio Barceñas; Arantxa Cossio Aceves	Brazil; Giulia Takahashi; Laura Watanabe	Cuba; Daniela Fonseca; Karla Perez Gonzalez
Women's doubles	Mexico; Clio Barceñas; Arantxa Cossio Aceves	Brazil; Giulia Takahashi; Laura Watanabe	United States; Sarah Jalli; Lin Yishiuan
Women's Team	Brazil; Giulia Takahashi; Laura Watanabe	Mexico; Arantxa Cossio Aceves; Clio Barceñas	Cuba; Karla Perez González; Daniela Fonseca
Women's Team	Brazil; Giulia Takahashi; Laura Watanabe	Mexico; Arantxa Cossio Aceves; Clio Barceñas	Puerto Rico; Fabiola Díaz; Brianna Burgos
Mixed doubles	Brazil; Rafael Turrini; Giulia Takahashi	Mexico; Dario Arce; Clio Barceñas	Canada; Jeremy Hazin; Sophie Gauthier
Mixed doubles	Brazil; Rafael Turrini; Giulia Takahashi	Mexico; Dario Arce; Clio Barceñas	Cuba; Eday Goméz; Daniela Fonseca
