= Stephan Steverink =

Brazilian swimmer

Personal information
- Full name: Stephan Alexander De Freitas Steverink
- National team: Brazil
- Born: 27 February 2004 (age 22) Flamengo, Rio de Janeiro, Brazil

Sport
- Sport: Swimming
- Strokes: Freestyle, individual medley
- Club: CR Flamengo
Medal record
Men's swimming
Representing Brazil
Event	1st	2nd	3rd
World Junior Championships	1	1	0
Junior Pan American Games	6	4	1
South American Youth Games	4	1	0
Total	11	6	1
World Junior Championships
Gold medal – first place	2022 Lima	400 m freestyle
Silver medal – second place	2022 Lima	400 m medley
Junior Pan American Games
Gold medal – first place	2021 Cali–Valle	4×200 m freestyle
Gold medal – first place	2025 Asuncion	200 m freestyle
Gold medal – first place	2025 Asuncion	400 m freestyle
Gold medal – first place	2025 Asuncion	800 m freestyle
Gold medal – first place	2025 Asuncion	400 m medley
Gold medal – first place	2025 Asuncion	4x200 m freestyle
Silver medal – second place	2021 Cali–Valle	800 m freestyle
Silver medal – second place	2021 Cali–Valle	400 m medley
Silver medal – second place	2021 Cali–Valle	4×100 m medley
Silver medal – second place	2025 Asuncion	200 m medley
Bronze medal – third place	2021 Cali–Valle	1500 m freestyle
South American Youth Games
Gold medal – first place	2022 Rosario	400 m freestyle
Gold medal – first place	2022 Rosario	1500 m freestyle
Gold medal – first place	2022 Rosario	200 m medley
Gold medal – first place	2022 Rosario	4×100 m freestyle
Silver medal – second place	2022 Rosario	200 m breaststroke
U.S. Open Championships
Bronze medal – third place	2022 Greensboro	800 m freestyle

Stephan Alexander De Freitas Steverink (born 27 February 2004) is a Brazilian competitive swimmer. He won the gold medal in the 400-metre freestyle and the silver medal in the 400-metre individual medley at the 2022 World Junior Championships. At the 2021 Junior Pan American Games, he won a gold medal in the 4×200-metre freestyle relay, silver medals in the 800-metre freestyle, 400-metre individual medley and 4×100-metre medley relay, as well as a bronze medal in the 1500-metre freestyle.

== Background ==
Steverink was born 27 February 2004 to a Brazilian mother and a Dutch father and holds citizenship of Brazil and the Netherlands. He trains and competes for CR Flamengo, continuing with the sports club through the 2024 Summer Olympics and changing his training base to Rio de Janeiro in 2023.

== Career ==
=== 2019–2021 ===
In 2019, Steverink won medals at national age group competitions in both Brazil and Netherlands as part of figuring out which country to represent in international competitions. Two years later, as part of swimming at the 2021 Junior Pan American Games held in Cali, Colombia, he won the gold medal in the 4×200-metre freestyle relay, the silver medal in the 800-metre freestyle with a 8:02.64, the silver medal in the 400-metre individual medley with a 4:24.35, a silver medal in the 4×100-metre medley relay, the bronze medal in the 1500-metre freestyle with a 15:34.41, and placed eighth in the b-final of the 200-metre individual medley with a 2:25.26.

=== 2022 ===
For the 2022 South American Youth Games, held in Rosario, Argentina in April and May, Steverink won a total of four golds medals, one each in the 400-metre freestyle, 1500-metre freestyle, 200-metre individual medley, and the 4×100-metre freestyle relay, as well as a silver medal in the 200-metre breaststroke. At the 2022 World Aquatics Championships, held at Danube Arena in June and July in Budapest, Hungary, Steverink placed sixteenth in the 400-metre individual medley with a time of 4:19.09.

==== 2022 World Junior Championships ====
2022 World Junior Championships
Gold medal – first place	400 m freestyle	3:48.27
Silver medal – second place	400 m individual medley	4:17.68

For the preliminaries of the 400-metre freestyle on day one of the 2022 FINA World Junior Swimming Championships, held in Lima, Peru, Steverink ranked first with a time of 3:50.24 and qualified for the final. In the evening final, he won the gold medal with a personal best time of 3:48.27, finishing less than two-tenths of a second ahead of silver medalist Vlad Stancu of Romania. With his win, he became the first male Brazilian swimmer to win a medal in the 400-metre freestyle at a FINA World Junior Swimming Championships and he won the first medal for Brazil at the 2022 Championships. On the third day of competition, he placed sixth in the 800-metre freestyle with a time of 8:01.21. The next day, he led-off the 4×200-metre freestyle relay in the final with a personal best time of 1:49.02, contributing to a fourth-place finish in 7:20.13, which was just 0.20 seconds slower than the bronze medal-winning team from Poland.

On the fifth morning, Steverink ranked second in the preliminary heats of the 400-metre individual medley, behind Riku Yamaguchi of Japan, with a time of 4:22.29. In the evening final, he lowered his time to a 4:17.68 and won the silver medal. The following, and final, day, he placed fourth in the 1500-metre freestyle with a time of 15:23.83, which was less than six seconds slower than bronze medalist Vlad Stancu.

==== 2022 U.S. Open Championships ====
Competing representing Brazil at the 2022 U.S. Open Swimming Championships, starting on 30 November in Greensboro, United States, Steverink won the bronze medal in the 800-metre freestyle with a time of 8:01.80, sharing the podium with fellow Brazilian and gold medalist Guilherme Costa and Venezuelan and silver medalist Alfonso Mestre. The second day, he placed fifth in the 400-metre freestyle with a time of 3:51.60. On the third evening, he finished in a time of 4:21.53 in the final of the 400-metre individual medley to place seventh.

=== 2023 ===
At the 2023 Brazil National Swimming Championships in Recife, Steverink started off with a silver medal on day one (30 May) in the 400-metre freestyle, finishing second in a time of 3:50.79. He followed up with a silver medal in the 1500-metre freestyle the following day with a time of 15:20.20. On day four, he finished in a 2023 World Aquatics Championships qualifying time of 4:17.26 in the final of the 400-metre individual medley, winning the gold medal. The fifth and final day, he won the bronze medal in the 800-metre freestyle with a final mark of 8:03.00.

== International championships ==
Meet	400 free	800 free	1500 free	200 breast	200 medley	400 medley	4×100 free	4×200 free	4×100 medley
Junior level
PANJ 2021 (age: 17)		(silver) (8:02.64)	(bronze) (15:34.41)		8th (b) (2:25.26)	(silver) (4:24.35)		(gold) (7:24.22)	(silver) (3:44.19)
SAYG 2022 (age: 18)	(gold) (3:51.36)	—N/a	(gold) (15:17.25)	(silver) (2:18.81)	(gold) (2:04.93)	—N/a	(gold) ^{[a]} (h - 3:37.23)	—N/a	
WJC 2022 (age: 18)	(gold) (3:48.27)	6th (8:01.21)	4th (15:23.83)			(silver) (4:17.68)		4th (7:20.13)	
Senior level
WC 2022 (age: 18)						16th (4:19.09)			

^{a} Steverink swam only in the preliminary heats.

== Personal best times ==
=== Long course metres (50 m pool) ===
Event	Time		Meet	Location	Date	Ref
200 m freestyle	1:49.02	r	2022 World Junior Championships	Lima, Peru	2 September 2022	
400 m freestyle	3:48.27		2022 World Junior Championships	Lima, Peru	30 August 2022	
800 m freestyle	7:57.70		2022 Brazil Swimming Trophy	Rio de Janeiro	7 April 2022	
1500 m freestyle	15:14.86		2022 Brazil Swimming Trophy	Rio de Janeiro	9 April 2022	
400 m individual medley	4:16.44		2022 Brazil Swimming Trophy	Rio de Janeiro	4 April 2022	

Legend: r – relay 1st leg

== Awards and honours ==
- Brazilian Olympic Committee, Year-end Junior Athletes Retrospective, highlight: 2022
- Olimpíada Todo Dia, Youth Athletes Retrospective, highlight: 2022
