= Judo at the 2021 Junior Pan American Games =

Judo Judo at the 2021 Junior Pan American Games
- Venue: Yuri Alvear Combat Arena
- Location: Cali, Colombia
- Dates: 26–28 November
- Competitors: 115 from 18 nations

Competition at external databases
- Links: JudoInside

Judo competitions at the 2021 Junior Pan American Games in Cali, Colombia were held from 26 to 28 November 2021.

== Medal summary ==
=== Medal table ===
* Host nation (Colombia)

Rank	Nation	Gold	Silver	Bronze	Total
1	Brazil	6	1	4	11
2	Cuba	2	2	3	7
2	United States	2	2	3	7
4	Venezuela	2	1	2	5
5	Dominican Republic	1	3	4	8
6	Argentina	1	1	0	2
6	Ecuador	1	1	0	2
8	Mexico	0	2	3	5
8	Peru	0	2	3	5
10	Colombia*	0	0	4	4
11	Chile	0	0	2	2
12	Guatemala	0	0	1	1
12	Puerto Rico	0	0	1	1
Totals (13 entries)		15	15	30	60

== Medalists ==
=== Men's ===
Event	Gold	Silver	Bronze
60 kg	Bryan Garboa; Ecuador	Arath Juárez; Mexico	Lucas Eduardo Fernandez; Chile
60 kg	Bryan Garboa; Ecuador	Arath Juárez; Mexico	Arnold Smith Prado; Peru
66 kg	Willis Alberto Garcia; Venezuela	Jack Yonezuka; United States	Kimy Bravo Blanco; Canada
66 kg	Willis Alberto Garcia; Venezuela	Jack Yonezuka; United States	Matheus Roberto Pedreira; Brazil
73 kg	Gabriel Falcão; Brazil	Antonio Tornal; Dominican Republic	Joreg Eduardo Perez; Mexico
73 kg	Gabriel Falcão; Brazil	Antonio Tornal; Dominican Republic	Nicholas Rodriguez; United States
81 kg	Agustin Nicolas Gil; Argentina	Marcos Soares dos Santos; Brazil	Albis Castro; Dominican Republic
81 kg	Agustin Nicolas Gil; Argentina	Marcos Soares dos Santos; Brazil	Javier Saavedra Bobadilla; Peru
90 kg	Alexander Knauf; United States	Sergueis Rodirguez; Cuba	Juan Lorenzo Diaz; Venezuela
90 kg	Alexander Knauf; United States	Sergueis Rodirguez; Cuba	Jeremy Olivares; Mexico
100 kg	Kayo Santos; Brazil	Axel del Castillo; Dominican Republic	Franco Arismendi; Chile
100 kg	Kayo Santos; Brazil	Axel del Castillo; Dominican Republic	Duvan Nieto; Colombia
+100 kg	Omar Cruz; Cuba	Joaquin Alejo Burgos; Argentina	Christian Konoval; United States
+100 kg	Omar Cruz; Cuba	Joaquin Alejo Burgos; Argentina	Daniel Lemes da Silva; Brazil

=== Women's ===
Event	Gold	Silver	Bronze
48 kg	Alexia Nascimento; Brazil	Maria Gabriela Gimenez; Venezuela	Aleida Guerrero; Dominican Republic
48 kg	Alexia Nascimento; Brazil	Maria Gabriela Gimenez; Venezuela	Maryury Ureña; Colombia
52 kg	Fabiola Valentina Diaz; Venezuela	Renata Ortiz; Mexico	Sheily Lopez del Cid; Guatemala
52 kg	Fabiola Valentina Diaz; Venezuela	Renata Ortiz; Mexico	Noemi Huayhuameza; Peru
57 kg	Tasha Cancela; United States	Kiara Arango; Peru	Paulina Garnica; Mexico
57 kg	Tasha Cancela; United States	Kiara Arango; Peru	Thailien Castillo Garcia; Cuba
63 kg	Ariela Sánchez; Dominican Republic	Edith Alejandra Ortiz; Ecuador	Sara Golden; United States
63 kg	Ariela Sánchez; Dominican Republic	Edith Alejandra Ortiz; Ecuador	Nauana Silva; Brazil
70 kg	Luana Carvalho; Brazil	Idelannis Gomez Feria; Cuba	Sairy Colon Rodríguez; Puerto Rico
70 kg	Luana Carvalho; Brazil	Idelannis Gomez Feria; Cuba	Esteysy Diaz; Colombia
78 kg	Eliza Ramos; Brazil	Yumiko Tanabe; Peru	Omaria Ramírez; Dominican Republic
78 kg	Eliza Ramos; Brazil	Yumiko Tanabe; Peru	Gueyler Colmenares; Colombia
+78 kg	Thalia Nariño Castellano; Cuba	Moira Morillo; Dominican Republic	Amarantha Urdaneta; Venezuela
+78 kg	Thalia Nariño Castellano; Cuba	Moira Morillo; Dominican Republic	Luana Ribeiro de Oliveira; Brazil

=== Mixed ===
Event	Gold	Silver	Bronze
Team	Brazil; Eliza Ramos; Gabriel Falcão; Kayo Santos; Luana Carvalho; Marcos Soares dos Santos; Thayane Lemos; Victor Hugo Nascimento	United States; Alexander Knauf; Christian Konoval; Natalija Stanojevic; Nicholas Rodriguez; Nicolas Yonezuka; Sara Golden; Tasha Cancela	Cuba; Idelannis Gomez Faria; Kimy Bravo Blanco; Omar Cruz; Sergueis Rodríguez Figueroa; Thailien Castillo Garcia; Thalia Nariño Castellano
Team	Brazil; Eliza Ramos; Gabriel Falcão; Kayo Santos; Luana Carvalho; Marcos Soares dos Santos; Thayane Lemos; Victor Hugo Nascimento	United States; Alexander Knauf; Christian Konoval; Natalija Stanojevic; Nicholas Rodriguez; Nicolas Yonezuka; Sara Golden; Tasha Cancela	Dominican Republic; Albis Castro; Antonio Tornal; Ariela Sánchez; Axel del Castillo; Clara Benítez; Moira Morillo
