= Artistic swimming at the 2021 Junior Pan American Games =

- Artistic swimming pictogram
- Venue: Piscinas Hernando Botero O'byrne
- Dates: 2–4 December
- Competitors: 74 from 15 nations

Artistic swimming competitions at the 2021 Junior Pan American Games in Cali, Colombia were held from 2 to 4 December 2021 at the Piscinas Hernando Botero O'byrne.

== Medal summary ==
=== Medal table ===
* Host nation (Colombia)

Rank	Nation	Gold	Silver	Bronze	Total
1	Mexico	3	1	0	4
2	United States	1	3	0	4
3	Brazil	0	0	2	2
3	Colombia*	0	0	2	2
Totals (4 entries)		4	4	4	12

== Medalists ==
Event	Gold		Silver		Bronze	
Duet	Mexico; Itzamary Gonzalez; Marla Fernanda Arellano	163.3175	United States; Anya Melson; Megumi Field	157.0661	Brazil; Jaddy Portela Passos; Jullia Gomes Soares	151.6635
Team	Mexico; Geraldine Vazquez; Izamary Gonzalez; Marla Fernanda Arellano; Miranda Barrera; Paulina Parra; Samantha Carmona; Veronica Aranda; Ximena Ortiz	163.8171	United States; Anya Melson; Atira O'Neil; Claudia Coletti; Elisa Brunel; Emily Ding; Ivy Davis; Keana Hunter; Megumi Field	162.6907	Colombia; Daniella Molano; Danna Corredor; Juliana Pacheco; Natalia Ruiz López; Salome Espitia; Sofia Abarca; Valentina Argoti; Valeria Argoti	150.4320
Highlight	Mexico; Geraldine Vazquez; Izamary Gonzalez; Marla Fernanda Arellano; Miranda Barrera; Paulina Parra; Samantha Carmona; Veronica Aranda; Ximena Ortiz	82.8000	United States; Anya Melson; Atira O'Neil; Claudia Coletti; Elisa Brunel; Emily Ding; Ivy Davis; Keana Hunter; Megumi Field	79.4000	Colombia; Daniella Molano; Danna Corredor; Juliana Pacheco; Natalia Ruiz López; Salome Espitia; Sofia Abarca; Valentina Argoti; Valeria Argoti	76.5667
Mixed Duet	United States; Ivy Davis; Kenneth Gaudet	154.0606	Mexico; Ximena Ortiz; Diego Villalobos	152.4413	Brazil; Celina Seabra Rangel; Murillo Texeira da Cunha	142.3841

== Qualification ==
A total of 80 artistic swimmers will qualify to compete at the games. As host nation, Colombia qualifies the maximum team size of nine athletes (eight women + 1 man). Seven other teams will qualify (each with nine athletes). Each team will also be required to compete in the duet event with athletes already qualified for the team event. A further four countries will qualify a duet only.

Canada and the United States, as being the only members located in zone 4 and zone 3 respectively, automatically qualify a full team. The South American region and the Central American and Caribbean region will qualify three teams and five duets each. Therefore, a total of eight teams and twelve duets, 8 mixed duets and 8 highlight teams will qualify.

== See also ==
- Artistic swimming at the 2020 Summer Olympics
- 2021 Junior Pan American Games
