= Janessa Fonseca =

Puerto Rican karateka (born 2001)

Personal information
- National team: Puerto Rico
- Born: Janessa Michelle Fonseca Romero; May 30, 2001 (age 25)

Sport
- Country: Puerto Rico
- Sport: Karate
- Weight class: 61 kg 68 kg
- Event: Kumite
Medal record
Women's karate
Representing Puerto Rico
World Championships
Silver medal – second place	2025 Cairo	Kumite 68 kg
Pan American Games
Gold medal – first place	2023 Santiago	Kumite 61 kg
Pan American Championships
Gold medal – first place	2024 Punta del Este	Kumite 68 kg
Central American and Caribbean Games
Gold medal – first place	2023 San Salvador	Kumite 61 kg
Gold medal – first place	2026 Santo Domingo	Kumite 68 kg
Junior Pan American Games
Gold medal – first place	2021 Cali-Valle	Kumite 61 kg

Janessa Michelle Fonseca Romero (Note: In this name that follows Hispanic American naming customs, the first or paternal surname is Fonseca and the second or maternal family name is Romero.) (born May 30, 2001) is a Puerto Rican karateka competing in the kumite. She is a silver medalist at the World Karate Championships, gold medalist at the Pan American Games, Pan American Championships, and a two-time gold medalist at the Central American and Caribbean Games.

== Career ==
Fonseca competed in the 2018 Summer Youth Olympics in the +59 kg category.

In June 2021, Fonseca competed at the World Olympic Qualification Tournament held in Paris, France to compete at the 2020 Summer Olympics in Tokyo, Japan. In November 2021, she competed in the women's 61 kg event at the 2021 World Karate Championships held in Dubai, United Arab Emirates, where she reached the third round. By December, she won the gold medal in her event at the 2021 Junior Pan American Games held in Cali, Colombia.

In July 2023, Fonseca won the gold medal in her event at the 2023 Central American and Caribbean Games held in San Salvador, El Salvador. In November 2023, she won the gold medal in her event at the 2023 Pan American Games held in Santiago, Chile. In May 2024, at the Pan American Championships held in Punta del Este, Uruguay, Fonseca competed in the 68 kg event and won a gold medal after defeating Anastasiia Velozo.

In November 2025, Fonseca competed in the 68 kg event at the World Karate Championships and won the silver medal, becoming the first Puerto Rican to win a medal in the competition. In August 2026, she won the gold medal in her event at the 2026 Central American and Caribbean Games held in Santo Domingo, Dominican Republic.
