= Cycling at the 2021 Junior Pan American Games =

- Cycling pictograms
- Venue: Velódromo Alcides Nieto Patiño; North Sports Complex Challenger Track; Urban circuit
- Dates: 26 November – 3 December

Cycling competitions at the 2021 Junior Pan American Games in Cali, Colombia, were held from 26 November to 3 December 2021.

20 medal events were contested in four cycling disciplines: track (12), road (4), BMX Racing (2), and Mountain Biking (2).

== Medal table ==
* Host nation (Colombia)

Rank	Nation	Gold	Silver	Bronze	Total
1	Colombia*	14	7	4	25
2	Mexico	3	7	2	12
3	Argentina	1	2	5	8
4	Chile	1	1	4	6
5	Costa Rica	1	0	0	1
6	Brazil	0	1	5	6
7	Bermuda	0	1	0	1
7	Ecuador	0	1	0	1
Totals (8 entries)		20	20	20	60

== Medalists ==
=== Road cycling ===
Event	Gold	Silver	Bronze
Men's road race	Gabriel Rojas; Costa Rica	Harold Martín López; Ecuador	Germán Darío Gómez; Colombia
Men's time trial	Victor Ocampo; Colombia	Kaden Hopkins; Bermuda	João Pedro Rossi; Brazil
Women's road race	Yareli Acevedo; Mexico	Erika Botero; Colombia	Elizabeth Castaño; Colombia
Women's time trial	Lina Hernández; Colombia	Yareli Acevedo; Mexico	Erika Botero; Colombia

=== Track cycling ===
Event	Gold	Silver	Bronze
Men's sprint	Cristian Ortega; Colombia	Carlos Echeverri; Colombia	Lucas Vilar; Argentina
Men's Keirin	Cristian Ortega; Colombia	Lucas Vilar; Argentina	Juan Carlos Ruíz; Mexico
Men's team sprint	Colombia; Carlos Echeverri; Cristian Ortega; Juan Esteban Arenas	Argentina; Juan Manuel Godoy; Lucas Vilar; Yoel Agustin Vargas	Mexico; Francisco Javier Contreras; Juan Carlos Ruíz; Ridley Malo
Men's team pursuit	Colombia; Juan Pablo Zapata; Anderson Arboleda; Juan Esteban Guerrero; Julián Osorio	Mexico; Jorge Peyrot; José Ramón Muñiz; Ricardo Peña; Tomas Aguirre	Chile; Alejandro Soto; Cristián Arriagada; Felipe Pizarro; Jacob Decar
Men's Madison	Mexico; Jorge Peyrot; José Ramón Muñiz	Chile; Cristián Arriagada; Felipe Pizarro	Brazil; Otávio Augusto Gonzeli; Pedro Volpato Rossi
Men's Omnium	Anderson Arboleda; Colombia	Ricardo Peña; Mexico	Jacob Thomas Decar; Chile
Women's sprint	Marianis Salazar; Colombia	María Vizcaíno; Mexico	Natalia Vera; Argentina
Women's Keirin	Marianis Salazar; Colombia	Valeria Cardozo; Colombia	Valentina Luna; Argentina
Women's team sprint	Colombia; Marianis Salazar; Valeria Cardozo; Yarli Mosquera	Mexico; María Vizcaíno; Melanie Ramírez; Sofía Martínez	Argentina; Milagros Sanabria; Natalia Vera; Valentina Luna
Women's team pursuit	Colombia; Elizabeth Castaño; Lina Rojas; Lina Hernández; Mariana Herrera	Mexico; Nicole Córdova; Romina Hinojosa; Victoria Velasco; Yareli Acevedo	Chile; Catalina Soto; Khamila Sepúlveda; Nya Mansilla; Scarlet Cortés
Women's Madison	Mexico; Victoria Velasco; Yareli Acevedo	Colombia; Lina Rojas; Lina Hernández	Chile; Catalina Soto; Scarlet Cortés
Women's Omnium	Lina Hernández; Colombia	Yareli Acevedo; Mexico	Maribel Aguirre; Argentina

=== Mountain biking ===
Event	Gold	Silver	Bronze
Men's cross-country	Martín Vidaurre; Chile	Nelson Peña; Colombia	Gustavo de Oliveira Pereira; Brazil
Women's cross-country	Angie Lara; Colombia	Ana María Roa; Colombia	Giuliana Morgen; Brazil

=== BMX racing ===
Event	Gold	Silver	Bronze
Men's	Mateo Carmona; Colombia	Samuel Pereira de Oliveira; Brazil	Juan Ramírez; Colombia
Women's	Agustina Cavalli; Argentina	Manuela Martínez; Colombia	Maitê Naves Barreto; Brazil
