= Kayo Santos =

Brazilian judoka (born 2002)

Personal information
- Born: 5 January 2002 (age 24) Arcoverde, Pernambuco
- Occupation: Judoka
- Height: 1.88 m (6 ft 2 in)

Sport
- Country: Brazil
- Sport: Judo
- Weight class: ‍–‍100 kg
Medal record
Men's judo
Representing Brazil
Pan American Games
Bronze medal – third place	2023 Santiago	‍–‍100 kg
Junior Pan American Games
Gold medal – first place	2021 Cali	‍–‍100 kg
Gold medal – first place	2021 Cali	Mixed team
Pan American Junior Championships
Gold medal – first place	2021 Cali	‍–‍100 kg
Gold medal – first place	2022 Lima	‍–‍100 kg
Pan American Cadet Championships
Gold medal – first place	2019 Cali	‍–‍100 kg

Profile at external databases
- IJF: 50526
- JudoInside.com: 134268
- Updated on 15 November 2023

Kayo Fabrício Silva dos Santos (born 5 January 2002 in Arcoverde) is a Brazilian judoka.

In 2019, he won the gold medal in the 90 kg category at the Pan-American Junior Judo Championship, held in Cali, Colombia. Current Brazilian school champion and Brazilian runner-up, Kayo Santos, from Associação Plínio Almeida, from Arcoverde, won the title defeating Canadian Amir Abis Elrehim.

At the 2021 Junior Pan American Games held in Cali, Colombia, he won two gold medals in the ‍–‍100 kg category and in the Brazilian Team.

At the 2023 Pan American Games, Santos obtained the bronze medal in the ‍–‍100 kg category.
