= Gabriel Falcão =

Brazilian judoka (born 2003)

Personal information
- Full name: Gabriel Falcão Lira
- Born: 5 July 2003 (age 22) Cachoeiras de Macacu, Rio de Janeiro
- Occupation: Judoka
- Height: 1.70 m (5 ft 7 in)

Sport
- Country: Brazil
- Sport: Judo
- Weight class: ‍–‍73 kg

Achievements and titles
- World Champ.: R32 (2025)
- Pan American Champ.: (2025)
Medal record
Men's judo
Representing Brazil
Pan American Games
Gold medal – first place	2023 Santiago	‍–‍73 kg
Silver medal – second place	2023 Santiago	Mixed team
Pan American Championships
Gold medal – first place	2025 Santiago	‍–‍81 kg
IJF Grand Prix
Silver medal – second place	2024 Zagreb	‍–‍81 kg
Bronze medal – third place	2025 Lima	‍–‍81 kg
Junior Pan American Games
Gold medal – first place	2021 Cali	‍–‍73 kg
Gold medal – first place	2021 Cali	Mixed team
Pan American Junior Championships
Gold medal – first place	2021 Cali	‍–‍73 kg
Gold medal – first place	2022 Lima	‍–‍73 kg
Gold medal – first place	2023 Calgary	‍–‍73 kg

Profile at external databases
- IJF: 50471
- JudoInside.com: 96439
- Updated on 13 October 2025

Gabriel Falcão Lira (born 5 July 2003 in Cachoeiras de Macacu) is a Brazilian judoka.

Falcão has practiced judo since he was 3 years old. In 2016 he became an athlete at Instituto Reação, in Rio de Janeiro.

At the 2021 Junior Pan American Games held in Cali, Colombia, Falcão won a gold medal in the ‍–‍73 kg category.

At the 2023 Pan American Games, Falcão won his biggest title, obtaining the gold medal in the ‍–‍73 kg category. He also obtained a silver medal for participating in the mixed team modality.

He reached his first medal contest on the senior World Circuit at the 2024 Judo Grand Prix Zagreb, where he won the silver medal.

At the 2025 Pan American-Oceania Judo Championships, he won the gold medal, his first title in this tournament.
