= Karate at the 2021 Junior Pan American Games =

- Karate pictogram
- Venue: Yuri Alvear Combat Arena
- Dates: 3–5 December
- Competitors: 73 from 23 nations

Karate competitions at the 2021 Junior Pan American Games in Cali, Colombia were held from 3 to 5 December 2021.

== Medal summary ==
=== Medal table ===
* Host nation (Colombia)

Rank	Nation	Gold	Silver	Bronze	Total
1	United States	4	0	1	5
2	Brazil	2	2	3	7
3	Chile	1	1	1	3
4	Puerto Rico	1	1	0	2
5	Peru	1	0	3	4
6	Canada	1	0	0	1
7	Mexico	0	4	1	5
8	Colombia*	0	1	4	5
9	Guatemala	0	1	0	1
10	Ecuador	0	0	3	3
11	Bolivia	0	0	1	1
11	Cuba	0	0	1	1
11	El Salvador	0	0	1	1
11	Venezuela	0	0	1	1
Totals (14 entries)		10	10	20	40

== Medalists ==
=== Men's ===
Event	Gold	Silver	Bronze
60 kg	Frank Ruiz; United States	Lucas Bruno Silva dos Santos; Brazil	Kurt García; Peru
60 kg	Frank Ruiz; United States	Lucas Bruno Silva dos Santos; Brazil	Alejandro Rivas; Venezuela
67 kg	Tomás Freire; Chile	Carlos Chacón; Guatemala	Juan Caicedo; Colombia
67 kg	Tomás Freire; Chile	Carlos Chacón; Guatemala	Nicolás Bouroncle; Peru
75 kg	Safin Kasturi; United States	Víctor Valdovinos; Mexico	Gabriel Pinheiro; Brazil
75 kg	Safin Kasturi; United States	Víctor Valdovinos; Mexico	César Olaya; Peru
84 kg	Saisheren Senpon; United States	Benjamín Núñez; Chile	Dariel Ducasse; Cuba
84 kg	Saisheren Senpon; United States	Benjamín Núñez; Chile	André Simões Freire dos Santos; Brazil
+84 kg	Giovani Salgado; Brazil	Pablo Benavides; Mexico	Nicolás Barrón; Bolivia
+84 kg	Giovani Salgado; Brazil	Pablo Benavides; Mexico	Diego Lemus; Colombia

=== Women's ===
Event	Gold	Silver	Bronze
50 kg	Yamina Lahyanssa; Canada	Irma Delgado; Mexico	Catalina Valdés; Chile
50 kg	Yamina Lahyanssa; Canada	Irma Delgado; Mexico	Lili Alvarado; Ecuador
55 kg	Trinity Allen; United States	Ericka Luque; Mexico	Juliana Cano; Colombia
55 kg	Trinity Allen; United States	Ericka Luque; Mexico	Ileana Miranda; Ecuador
61 kg	Janessa Fonseca; Puerto Rico	Anna Prezzoti; Brazil	Alexandra Wainwright; United States
61 kg	Janessa Fonseca; Puerto Rico	Anna Prezzoti; Brazil	Natalia Bernal; Colombia
68 kg	Bárbara Rodrigues; Brazil	Destiny Vergara; Puerto Rico	María Briones; Ecuador
68 kg	Bárbara Rodrigues; Brazil	Destiny Vergara; Puerto Rico	Pamela Campos; Mexico
+68 kg	Gianella Fernández; Peru	Laura Pescador; Colombia	Andrea Ruiz; El Salvador
+68 kg	Gianella Fernández; Peru	Laura Pescador; Colombia	Rafaela dos Santos Silva; Brazil
