= Gymnastics at the 2021 Junior Pan American Games =

- Gymnastics pictograms
- Venue: Coliseo El Pueblo
- Dates: 26 November–5 December

Gymnastics competitions at the 2021 Junior Pan American Games in Cali, Colombia were held from November 26 to December 5, 2021.

== Medal summary ==
=== Medal table ===
Rank	Nation	Gold	Silver	Bronze	Total
1	United States	14	8	7	29
2	Brazil	6	8	6	20
3	Mexico	4	3	5	12
4	Argentina	1	1	0	2
5	Dominican Republic	1	0	0	1
6	Peru	0	3	0	3
7	Chile	0	2	0	2
8	Canada	0	1	1	2
9	Colombia	0	0	4	4
10	Costa Rica	0	0	2	2
11	Ecuador	0	0	1	1
Totals (11 entries)		26	26	26	78

== Medalists ==
=== Artistic gymnastics ===
==== Men's events ====
Event	Gold	Silver	Bronze
Team	United States; Tobias Liang; Cole Patridge; Vahe Petrosyan; David Shamah	Brazil; Yuri Guimarães; Diogo Paes; João Victor Perdigão; Gustavo Pereira	Colombia; Esteban Hoyos; Juan Larrahondo; Daniel Villa; Sergio Vargas
Individual all-around	Vahe Petrosyan; United States	Luciano Letelier; Chile	Tobias Liang; United States
Floor exercise	Tobias Liang; United States	Luciano Letelier; Chile	Ariel Villalobos; Costa Rica
Pommel horse	David Shamah; United States	Edward Alarcón; Peru	Gustavo Pereira; Brazil
Rings	Jabiel Polanco; Dominican Republic	Edward Alarcón; Peru	Ariel Villalobos; Costa Rica
Vault	Ricardo Torres; Mexico	Edward Gonzales; Peru	Cesar Lopez; Ecuador
Parallel bars	David Shamah; United States	Yuri Guimarães; Brazil	Diogo Paes; Brazil
Horizontal bar	Diogo Paes; Brazil	Vahe Petrosyan; United States	Daniel Villa; Colombia

==== Women's events ====
Event	Gold	Silver	Bronze
Team	United States; Kailin Chio; Madray Johnson; Katelyn Jong; Tiana Sumanasekera	Brazil; Gabriela Barbosa; Josiany Calixto; Andreza Lima; Gabriela Reis	Mexico; Mariangela Flores; Marianna Malpica; Alejandra Martinez; Gabriela Mendoza
Individual all-around	Katelyn Jong; United States	Kailin Chio; United States	Aurélie Tran; Canada
Vault	Tiana Sumanasekera; United States	Katelyn Jong; United States	Andreza Lima; Brazil
Uneven bars	Madray Johnson; United States	Aurélie Tran; Canada	Kailin Chio; United States
Balance beam	Madray Johnson; United States	Katelyn Jong; United States	Andreza Lima; Brazil
Floor exercise	Kailin Chio; United States	Katelyn Jong; United States	Mariangela Flores; Mexico

=== Rhythmic gymnastics ===
==== Individual ====
Event	Gold	Silver	Bronze
Individual all-around	Maria Eduarda Alexandre; Brazil	Nayenne Ashenaffi; United States	Sarah Mariotti; United States
Hoop	Nayenne Ashenaffi; United States	Maria Eduarda Alexandre; Brazil	Sarah Mariotti; United States
Ball	Maria Eduarda Alexandre; Brazil	Crista Hernandez; Mexico	Isadora Oliveira; Brazil
Clubs	Maria Eduarda Alexandre; Brazil	Sarah Mariotti; United States	Isadora Oliveira; Brazil
Ribbon	Sarah Mariotti; United States	Isadora Oliveira; Brazil	Sofia Perez; Mexico

==== Group ====
Event	Gold	Silver	Bronze
Group all-around	Mexico; Anette Alondra; Pamela Burguete; Georgina Hernandez; Idalia Lecuona; Giselle Osorio	Brazil; Fernanda Heinemann; Julia Kurunczi; Luiza Pugliese; Bianca Reis; Gabryela da Rocha	United States; Irina Fesyun; Sophia Miller; Angelina Mirer; Natalia Ortigosa; Alexandra Rykova
5 balls	Mexico; Anette Alondra; Pamela Burguete; Georgina Hernandez; Idalia Lecuona; Giselle Osorio	Brazil; Fernanda Heinemann; Julia Kurunczi; Luiza Pugliese; Bianca Reis; Gabryela da Rocha	United States; Irina Fesyun; Sophia Miller; Angelina Mirer; Natalia Ortigosa; Alexandra Rykova
5 ribbons	Brazil; Fernanda Heinemann; Julia Kurunczi; Luiza Pugliese; Bianca Reis; Gabryela da Rocha	Mexico; Anette Alondra; Pamela Burguete; Georgina Hernandez; Idalia Lecuona; Giselle Osorio	United States; Irina Fesyun; Sophia Miller; Angelina Mirer; Natalia Ortigosa; Alexandra Rykova

=== Trampoline gymnastics ===
Event	Gold	Silver	Bronze
Men's individual	Rayan Dutra; Brazil	Elijah Vogel; United States	Adrian Martinez; Mexico
Men's synchronized	United States; Zachary Ramacci; Elijah Vogel	Brazil; Rayan Dutra; Vinicius Celestino	Mexico; Jose Hugo Marin; Adrian Martinez
Women's individual	Mariola Garcia; Mexico	Valentina Podesta; Argentina	Nicole Castellanos; Colombia
Women's synchronized	Argentina; Lucila Maldonado; Valentina Podesta	Mexico; Mariola Garcia; Maria Jose Gonzalez	Colombia; Nicole Castellanos; Gilary Riascos

== See also ==
- 2021 Junior Pan American Artistic Gymnastics Championships
- 2021 Junior Pan American Rhythmic Gymnastics Championships
- 2021 Pan American Gymnastics Championships
- Gymnastics at the 2020 Summer Olympics
