= Sailing at the 2021 Junior Pan American Games =

- Sailing pictogram
- Venue: Calima Lake
- Dates: 2–4 December
- Competitors: 43 from 20 nations

Sailing competitions at the 2021 Junior Pan American Games in Cali, Colombia, were held from 2 to 4 December 2021.

== Medal summary ==
=== Medal table ===
* Host nation (Colombia)

Rank	Nation	Gold	Silver	Bronze	Total
1	Argentina	1	1	1	3
2	Mexico	1	0	1	2
3	Chile	1	0	0	1
3	Uruguay	1	0	0	1
5	United States	0	2	1	3
6	Brazil	0	1	0	1
7	Saint Lucia	0	0	1	1
Totals (7 entries)		4	4	4	12

== Medalists ==
Event	Gold	Silver	Bronze
Men's IQ Foil	Marcos Quiroga; Argentina	Alexander Temko; United States	Cristobal Hagerman; Mexico
Men's ILCA 7	Clemente Seguel; Chile	Juan Pablo Cardozo; Argentina	Luc Chevrier; Saint Lucia
Women's IQ Foil	Mariana Aguilar Chávez; Mexico	Giovanna Prada; Brazil	Brynn Muller; United States
Women's ILCA 6	Dolores Fraschini; Uruguay	Kanttida Charlotte Rose; United States	Luciana Andrea Cardozo; Argentina
