= Speed skating at the 2021 Junior Pan American Games =

- Speed skating pictograms
- Venue: World Cup Skate Track
- Dates: 30 November–2 December
- Competitors: 42 from 15 nations

Speed skating competitions at the 2021 Junior Pan American Games in Cali, Colombia were held from 30 November to 2 December 2021. It has a total of 12 events: 6 boys' and 6 girls'.

== Medal summary ==
=== Medal table ===
* Host nation (Colombia)

Rank	Nation	Gold	Silver	Bronze	Total
1	Colombia*	10	0	1	11
2	Brazil	2	0	0	2
3	Ecuador	0	8	0	8
4	Mexico	0	2	0	2
5	Chile	0	1	5	6
6	Argentina	0	1	1	2
7	Venezuela	0	0	3	3
8	El Salvador	0	0	2	2
Totals (8 entries)		12	12	12	36

== Medalists ==
Event	Gold	Silver	Bronze
Boys' 200 metre	Guilherme Rocha; Brazil	Francisco Petrelli; Argentina	Salomon Carballo; Colombia
Boys' 500 metre	Guilherme Rocha; Brazil	Nicolas Albornoz; Chile	José Carlos Rangel; Venezuela
Boys' 1,000 metre sprint	Juan Mantilla; Colombia	Santiago López; Mexico	José Carlos Rangel; Venezuela
Boys' lap	Salomon Carballo; Colombia	Juan Fernando Reinoso; Ecuador	Francisco Petrelli; Argentina
Boys' 10,000 points race	Juan Mantilla; Colombia	Joel Guacho; Ecuador	Ignacio Mardones; Chile
Boys' 10,000 elimination race	Juan Mantilla; Colombia	Joel Guacho; Ecuador	Ignacio Mardones; Chile
Girls' 200 metre	Valeria Rodríguez; Colombia	María Arias; Ecuador	Ivonne Nóchez; El Salvador
Girls' 500 metre	Valeria Rodríguez; Colombia	María Arias; Ecuador	Catalina Lorca; Chile
Girls' 1,000 metre sprint	Gabriela Rueda; Colombia	María Arias; Ecuador	Catalina Lorca; Chile
Girls' lap	Valeria Rodríguez; Colombia	María Arias; Ecuador	Ivonne Nóchez; El Salvador
Girls' 10,000 points race	Gabriela Rueda; Colombia	Valeria Idiaquez; Mexico	Daniela Bustamante; Venezuela
Girls' 10,000 elimination race	Gabriela Rueda; Colombia	Martina Pita; Ecuador	Nicolle Ulloa; Chile
