= Lucas Rabelo =

Brazilian skateboarder (born 1999)

Personal information
- Full name: Lucas Rabelo
- Born: 1 January 1999 (age 27) Fortaleza, Brazil

Sport
- Country: Brazil
- Sport: Skateboarding
Medal record
Men's street skateboarding
Representing Brazil
World Championships
Silver medal – second place	2021 Jacksonville	Street
Pan American Games
Gold medal – first place	2023 Santiago	Street
Junior Pan American Games
Gold medal – first place	2021 Cali-Valle	Street

Lucas Rabelo (born 1 January 1999) is a Brazilian skateboarder who is specialized in Street Skateboarding.

He left Fortaleza at the age of 13 to live in Rio Grande do Sul, invited by businessman Rafael Xavier. He turned professional in 2020, in Long Beach, California.

At the 2021 World Skateboarding Championship, he won the silver medal in the Men's street.

He also won the 2021 Junior Pan American Games and came fourth at the 2022 X Games. In May 2022, before the start of the season, he tore the anterior cruciate ligament in his left knee. The injury forced Lucas to undergo surgery, causing him to miss the season.

At the 2023 Pan American Games held in Santiago, Chile, he won the gold medal in the Men's street.
