= Softball at the 2021 Junior Pan American Games =

- Venue: Estadio Edgardo Schemel
- Location: (Colombia) Barranquilla
- Dates: 27 November – 2 December
- Nations: 8
- Teams: 8 (women)

The softball competition of the 2021 Junior Pan American Games in Cali, Colombia was held from 27 November to 2 December at the Estadio Edgardo Schemel, the events were played by women's U23 national teams.

== Participating teams ==
Women

- Argentina
- Brazil
- Colombia
- Mexico
- Peru
- Puerto Rico
- Venezuela
- United States

== Medal summary ==
=== Medal table ===
Rank	Nation	Gold	Silver	Bronze	Total
1	United States	1	0	0	1
2	Mexico	0	1	0	1
3	Puerto Rico	0	0	1	1
Totals (3 entries)		1	1	1	3

== Medalists ==
Event	Gold	Silver	Bronze
Women's tournament	United States; Alissa Humphrey; Erin Coffel; Haidyn Sokoloski; Joecellia Roberts; Karli Spaid; Keagan Rothrock; Keely Williams; Kinsey Fiedler; Maci Bergeron; Mackenzie Morgan; Megan Grant; Olivia Johnson; Rylee Holtorf; Valerie Cagle; Violet-Marie Zavodnik	Mexico; Alondra Monsserratt Dominguez Zepeda; Ana Lourdes Rosas Valenzuela; Anahi Veronica Pintado Nuñez; Desiree Denise Hernandez; Edith Elena De Leija Sanchez; Jenny Jocelyn Robledo Peña; Jordyn Sky Villanueva Ramos; Karen Michelle Lizarraga Ramos; Kimberli Shantel Rodas Diaz; Leeslye Yessenia Valdez Cabrera; Lillianna Marie Garcia Guzman; Mariangel Barbosa Ruiz; Marlene Espinoza Casiano; Romina Ruelas Romero; Ximena Isabel Zamarron Alaniz; Yanina Fernanda Treviño Zapata	Puerto Rico; Aminah Sole Vega; Ana Maria Roman; Camille Nahir Ortiz Martinez; Claudia Yuiza Paloma Ortiz Luna; Genesis Michelle Miranda Pagan; Imani Fontaine; Isabella Marjorie Secaira-Cotto; Jairian Marie Leon Silva; Janelle Martinez Garcia; Kairi Rodriguez; Kamila Vicente Quiñones; Kathyria Marie Garcia Soto; Macey Lee Cintron; Samantha Pagan; Sydney Ann Shimkus; Tatianna Rios Roman

=== Final standing ===
Rank	Team
1st place, gold medalist(s)	United States
2nd place, silver medalist(s)	Mexico
3rd place, bronze medalist(s)	Puerto Rico
4	Peru
5	Brazil
6	Colombia
7	Venezuela
8	Argentina

== See also ==
- Softball at the Junior Pan American Games
