= Badminton at the 2021 Junior Pan American Games =

- Badminton pictogram
- Venue: Pacific Valley Events Center
- Location: Yumbo, Valle
- Dates: 26–29 November
- Competitors: 65 from 23 nations

Badminton competitions at the 2021 Junior Pan American Games in Yumbo, Colombia were scheduled to be held from November 26 to 29, 2021.

Canada went on to sweep all three gold medals.

== Medal summary ==
=== Medal table ===
* Host nation (Colombia)

| Rank | Nation | Gold | Silver | Bronze | Total |
|---|---|---|---|---|---|
| 1 | Canada | 3 | 0 | 0 | 3 |
| 2 | El Salvador | 0 | 2 | 0 | 2 |
| 3 | United States | 0 | 1 | 0 | 1 |
| 4 | Brazil | 0 | 0 | 3 | 3 |
| 5 | Argentina | 0 | 0 | 1 | 1 |
| 5 | Mexico | 0 | 0 | 1 | 1 |
| 5 | Peru | 0 | 0 | 1 | 1 |
| Totals (7 entries) | | 3 | 3 | 6 | 12 |

== Medalists ==
| Event | Gold | Silver | Bronze |
|---|---|---|---|
| Boys' singles | Brian Yang; Canada | Uriel Canjura; El Salvador | Jonathan Matias; Brazil |
| Boys' singles | Brian Yang; Canada | Uriel Canjura; El Salvador | Luis Montoya; Mexico |
| Girls' singles | Rachel Chan; Canada | Natalie Chi; United States | Juliana Vieira; Brazil |
| Girls' singles | Rachel Chan; Canada | Natalie Chi; United States | Inés Castillo; Peru |
| Mixed doubles | Canada; Brian Yang; Rachel Chan | El Salvador; Uriel Canjura; Fátima Centeno | Brazil; Jonathan Matias; Jaqueline Lima |
| Mixed doubles | Canada; Brian Yang; Rachel Chan | El Salvador; Uriel Canjura; Fátima Centeno | Argentina; Nicolas Oliva; Iona Gualdi |
