= Pâmela Rosa =

Brazilian skateboarder (born 1999)

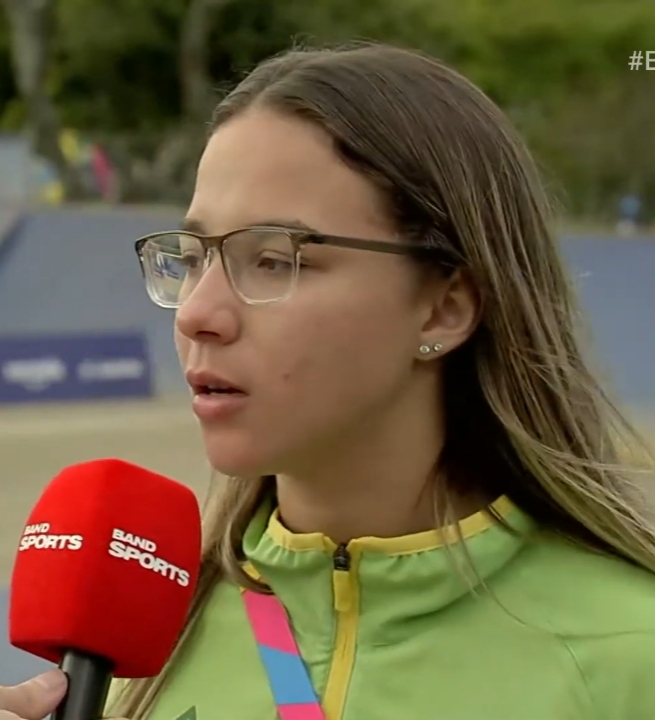

Personal information
- Full name: Pâmela Leite Rosa
- Born: 19 July 1999 (age 27) São José dos Campos
- Height: 163 cm (5 ft 4 in)
- Weight: 56 kg (123 lb)

Sport
- Sport: Skateboarding
- Rank: 15th – street (August 2024)
Medal record
Women's street skateboarding
Representing Brazil
Street League Skateboarding (SLS)
Gold medal – first place	2019 São Paulo (F)	Street
Gold medal – first place	2021 Jacksonville (F)	Street
Pan American Games
Silver medal – second place	2023 Santiago	Street
X Games
Gold medal – first place	2016 Oslo	Street
Gold medal – first place	2016 Austin	Street
Silver medal – second place	2014 Austin	Street
Silver medal – second place	2015 Austin	Street
Silver medal – second place	2019 Oslo	Street
Bronze medal – third place	2018 Oslo	Street
Junior Pan American Games
Gold medal – first place	2021 Cali-Valle	Street

Pâmela Leite Rosa (born 19 July 1999) is a Brazilian professional skateboarder. She represented Brazil at the 2020 and 2024 Summer Olympics.

Rosa has won two final season titles (Super Crown) at the Street League Skateboarding (SLS).

== Early life ==
Rosa was born in São José dos Campos, Brazil.

== Skateboarding career ==
At the age of 20, Rosa has won 6 X Games medals, including two gold. Rosa competed in the 2019 Street League Skateboarding Tour - London, placing first.

Rosa competed in the 2021 Street League Skateboarding Super Crown Final in Jacksonville, and placed first, taking the position of "Top Female Street Skater" for the year.
