= 2021 Junior Pan American Games =

1st edition of the Junior Pan American Games

I Junior Pan American Games
- Logo of the 2021 Junior Pan American Games
- Host: Cali–Valle, Colombia
- Motto: Ready To Give #AllForYou; Spanish: ¡Somos Tu Fuerza! Nos Damos #TodosxVos
- Nations: 41
- Events: 302 in 28 sports
- Opening: November 25
- Closing: December 5
- Opened by: Iván Duque
- Main venue: Estadio Olímpico Pascual Guerrero

The 2021 Junior Pan American Games (Spanish: Juegos Panamericanos Junior 2021) were the first edition of the Junior Pan American Games, an international multi-sports event for athletes aged 17 to 22 in the Americas, organized by Panam Sports. It was held in Cali and Valle, Colombia between November 25 to December 5, 2021.

== Candidate cities ==
The deadline for the presentation of candidacy to organize the first Junior Pan American Games was January 31, 2019, on which date Cali, Santa Ana, and Monterrey were selected as host city candidates by Panam Sports. Cali was chosen as the host city by the Executive Committee in San José, Costa Rica on March 27, 2019.

=== Cali, Colombia ===
Colombian Olympic Committee President Baltazar Medina noted that the reason Cali applied to host the games was to open the possibility of Colombia hosting larger multi-sports events, such as the Bolivarian Games and the Central American and Caribbean Games. Cali would be the main city for the games, while Palmira, Buga, and Calima El Darién would act as sub-centers. Notably, 2021 will be the 50th anniversary of the 1971 Pan American Games, which is the last time that Cali hosted the Pan American Games.

=== Santa Ana, El Salvador ===
On January 29, 2019, Mayoress Milena Calderón Sol de Escalón confirmed that Santa Ana would apply to be the host of the inaugural games, stating, "We are preparing all the presentations we have to do before the International Olympic Committee. It will be in Costa Rica where El Salvador, through Santa Ana, will be presented (to host the 2021 Junior Pan American Games)."

=== Monterrey, Mexico ===
President of the Mexican Olympic Committee Carlos Padilla Becerra expressed interest in Monterrey hosting the inaugural Junior Games, stating, "Mexico hopes that the competition can take place in Monterrey in 2021; it is a city that has the adequate infrastructure to carry them out, and it a minimum expenditure would be necessary." However, there was a risk from lack of government support that caused the bid to be eliminated from the final vote.

== Venues ==
Cali and six other locales (Buga, Yumbo, Jamundí, Calima El Darien, Palmira and Barranquilla) in Colombia will stage the competitions.

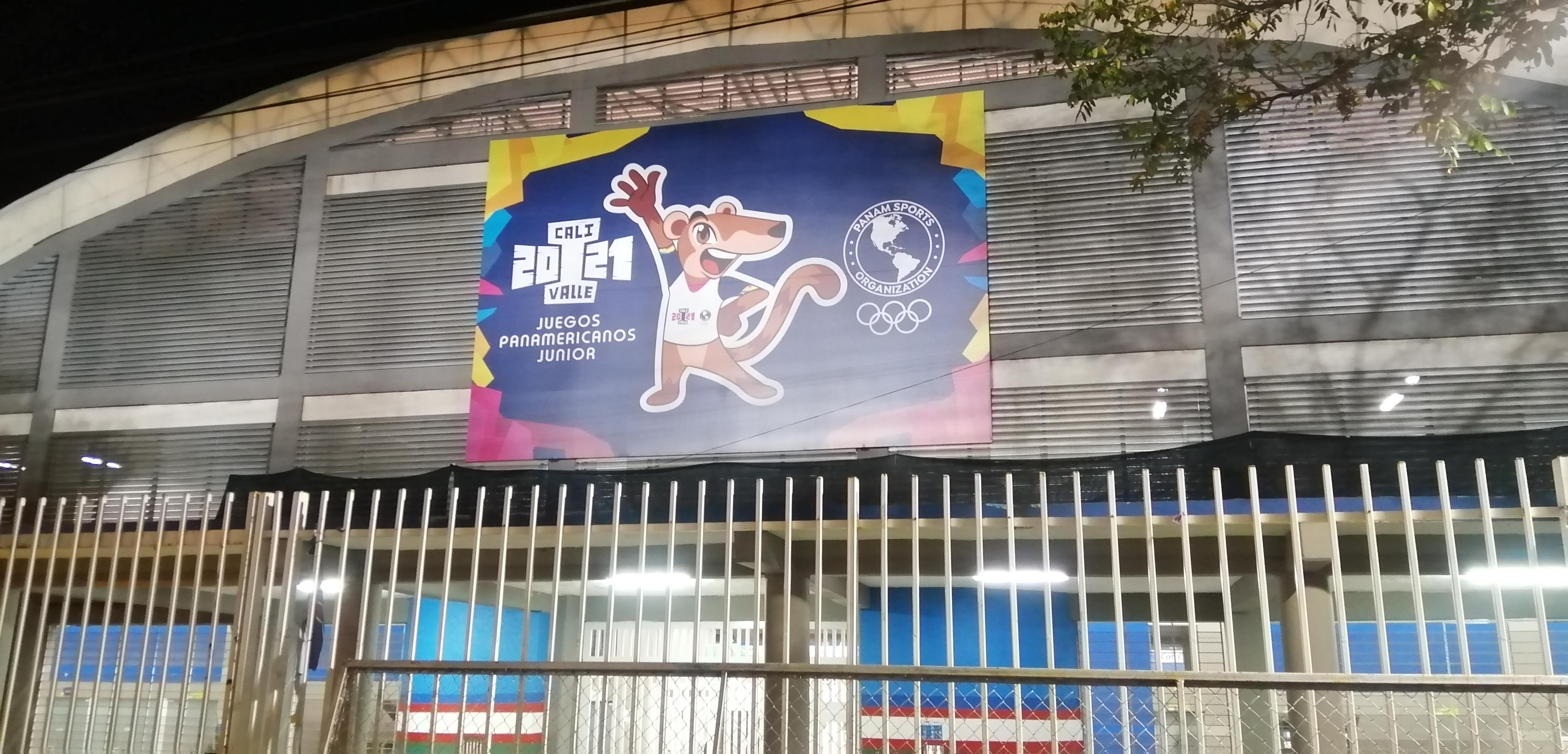
Coliseo Evangelista Mora in Cali, branded with the I Junior Pan American Games.

=== Cali ===
Venue	Sports	Capacity	Ref.
Estadio Olímpico Pascual Guerrero	Athletics; Ceremonines	38,000	
Bowling Arena	Bowling		
Club Campestre de Cali	Modern pentathlon Squash; Tennis		
Coliseo El Pueblo	Gymnastics (all disciplines)		
CVC Bernardo Tobar Sports Club	Shooting		
Coliseo Evangelista Mora	Volleyball (indoor)		
Hernando Botero O'byrne Swimming Pools	Artistic swimming Diving; Swimming		
Hockey Miguel Calero Arena	Taekwondo; Wrestling		
Iván Vassilev Todorov Arena	Handball		
Pan American Courts	3x3 basketball, Beach volleyball		
Skate Park Calida	Roller sports (skateboarding)		
World Cup Skate Track	Roller sports (speed)		
Velódromo Alcides Nieto Patiño	Cycling (track), Roller sports (artistic)		

=== Buga ===
Venue	Sports	Capacity	Ref.
Luis Ignacio Alvarez Arena	Boxing		
North Sports Complex Challenger Track	Cycling (BMX)		
Urban circuit	Cycling (road)		

=== Barranquilla ===
Venue	Sports	Capacity	Ref.
Estadio Édgar Rentería	Baseball		
Estadio Edgardo Schemel	Softball		

=== Jamundí ===
Venue	Sports	Capacity	Ref.
Yuri Alvear Combat Arena	Judo; Karate		

=== Calima El Darien ===
Venue	Sports	Capacity	Ref.
Calima Lake	Canoeing; Rowing; Sailing; Triathlon		

=== Palmira ===
Venue	Sports	Capacity	Ref.
Estadio Francisco Rivera Escobar	Archery		
Multifunctional White Arena 1	Table tennis		
Ramón Elías López Arena	Weightlifting		

=== Yumbo ===
Venue	Sports	Capacity	Ref.
Pacific Valley Events Center	Badminton; Fencing; Squash		
Pista Raúl Pizarro	Cycling (mountain bike)		

== The Games ==
=== Sports ===
321 events in 28 sports were contested. The full sport program was confirmed in September 2020. After originally being included, basketball (5x5), BMX freestyle and field hockey were not included on the final list. Other Olympic events and disciplines not contested included open water swimming, water polo, canoe slalom, equestrian, football and rugby sevens.

Numbers in parentheses indicate the number of medal events to be contested in each sport/discipline.

- Aquatics
  - Artistic swimming (4)
  - Diving (7)
  - Swimming (36)
- Archery (8)
- Athletics (45)
- Badminton (3)
- Baseball
  - Baseball (1)
  - Softball (1)
- 3x3 basketball (3)
- Bowling (4)
- Boxing (13)
- Canoeing
  - Canoe sprint (12)
- Cycling
  - BMX racing (2)
  - Mountain biking (2)
  - Road (4)
  - Track (12)
- Fencing (6)
- Gymnastics
  - Artistic gymnastics (14)
  - Rhythmic gymnastics (8)
  - Trampoline (4)
- Handball (2)
- Judo (14)
- Karate (10)
- Modern pentathlon (3)
- Roller sports
  - Artistic skating (2) (details)
  - Skateboarding (2) (details)
  - Speed skating (12) (details)
- Rowing (10)
- Sailing (4)
- Shooting (6)
- Squash (7)
- Table tennis (7)
- Taekwondo (8)
- Tennis (5)
- Triathlon (3)
- Volleyball
  - Beach volleyball (2)
  - Volleyball (2)
- Weightlifting (14)
- Wrestling
  - Freestyle (12)
  - Greco-Roman (6)

=== Participating National Olympic Committees ===
All 41 nations who are members of the Panam Sports were expected to compete. The numbers in parentheses represents the number of athletes qualified.

Participating National Olympic Committees
- Antigua and Barbuda
- Argentina (272)
- Aruba (16)
- Bahamas (17)
- Barbados (14)
- Belize (12)
- Bermuda (12)
- Bolivia
- Brazil (358)
- British Virgin Islands (9)
- Canada (31)
- Cayman Islands (14)
- Colombia (364) (Host)
- Chile (220)
- Costa Rica
- Cuba (209)
- Dominica
- Dominican Republic
- Ecuador
- El Salvador
- Grenada (10)
- Guatemala (122)
- Guyana (22)
- Haiti
- Honduras
- Jamaica
- Mexico (357)
- Nicaragua
- Panama (43)
- Paraguay (69)
- Peru (160)
- Puerto Rico
- Saint Lucia (14)
- Saint Kitts and Nevis (3)
- Saint Vincent and the Grenadines
- Suriname
- Trinidad and Tobago (23)
- United States
- Uruguay
- Venezuela (192)
- Virgin Islands

== Schedule ==
OC	Opening ceremony	●	Event competitions	1	Event finals	CC	Closing ceremony

November/December		23 Tue	24 Wed	25 Thu	26 Fri	27 Sat	28 Sun	29 Mon	30 Tue	1 Wed	2 Thu	3 Fri	4 Sat	5 Sun	Events
Ceremonies (opening / closing)				OC										CC	—N/a
Aquatics	Artistic swimming										●	2	2		4
Aquatics	Diving			1	2	2	2								7
Aquatics	Swimming				8	7	9	6	6						36
Archery					●	●	8								8
Athletics									5	7	12	12	9		45
Badminton					●	●	●	3							3
Baseball	Baseball				●	●	●	●	●	●	1				1
Baseball	Softball					●	●	●	●	●	1				1
3x3 basketball							●	●	2						2
Bowling							2	●	2						4
Boxing					●	●	●	●		13					13
Canoeing				●	7	5									12
Cycling	BMX				●	2									2
Cycling	Mountain biking					2									2
Cycling	Road									2	1	1			4
Cycling	Track				3	2	2	5							12
Fencing												2	2	2	6
Gymnastics	Artistic				2	2	5	5							14
Gymnastics	Rhythmic										●	●	2	6	8
Gymnastics	Trampoline											●	4		4
Handball		●	●	●	●	●	1	●	●	●		●	1		2
Judo					7	7	1								15
Karate												●	4	6	10
Modern pentathlon											●	●	●	3	3
Roller sports	Artistic											●	2		2
Roller sports	Skateboarding				2										2
Roller sports	Speed								●	4	8				12
Rowing										●	2	4	4		10
Sailing											●	●	4		4
Shooting					2	2	2								6
Squash					●	2	●	3	●	2					7
Table tennis									●	●	●	●	●	2	2
Taekwondo					4	4									8
Tennis								●	●	●	●	3	2		5
Triathlon					2		1								3
Volleyball	Beach								●	●	●	●	2		2
Volleyball	Indoor				●	●	●	●	1	●	●	●	●	1	2
Weightlifting					4	4	4	2							14
Wrestling										6	3	5	4		18
Total events				1	43	41	37	24	16	34	28	29	42	20	315
Cumulative total				1	44	85	122	146	162	196	224	253	295	315	315
		23 Tue	24 Wed	25 Thu	26 Fri	27 Sat	28 Sun	29 Mon	30 Tue	1 Wed	2 Thu	3 Fri	4 Sat	5 Sun	Events

== Medal table ==
The official medal table:

* Host nation (Colombia)

Rank	Nation	Gold	Silver	Bronze	Total
1	Brazil	59	49	56	164
2	Colombia*	48	34	63	145
3	United States	47	29	38	114
4	Mexico	46	78	48	172
5	Cuba	29	19	22	70
6	Argentina	19	22	32	73
7	Ecuador	15	14	24	53
8	Chile	12	15	31	58
9	Puerto Rico	8	4	8	20
10	Uruguay	8	3	3	14
11	Venezuela	7	8	21	36
12	Peru	6	15	14	35
13	Dominican Republic	5	8	10	23
14	Canada	4	1	5	10
15	Paraguay	2	4	4	10
16	Costa Rica	2	3	5	10
17	Aruba	2	1	0	3
18	Guatemala	1	5	10	16
19	Bolivia	1	1	2	4
20	El Salvador	0	3	5	8
21	Trinidad and Tobago	0	1	1	2
22	Bermuda	0	1	0	1
22	Grenada	0	1	0	1
22	Guyana	0	1	0	1
22	Nicaragua	0	1	0	1
22	Saint Kitts and Nevis	0	1	0	1
27	Panama	0	0	5	5
28	Bahamas	0	0	1	1
28	Barbados	0	0	1	1
28	Honduras	0	0	1	1
28	Saint Lucia	0	0	1	1
32	Antigua and Barbuda	0	0	0	0
32	Belize	0	0	0	0
32	British Virgin Islands	0	0	0	0
32	Cayman Islands	0	0	0	0
32	Dominica	0	0	0	0
32	Haiti	0	0	0	0
32	Jamaica	0	0	0	0
32	Saint Vincent and the Grenadines	0	0	0	0
32	Suriname	0	0	0	0
32	Virgin Islands	0	0	0	0
Totals (41 entries)		321	322	411	1,054
