= Triathlon at the 2023 Pan American Games – Qualification =

The following is the qualification system for the triathlon at the 2023 Pan American Games event and qualified athletes/quotas.

== Qualification system ==
A total of 72 triathletes (36 per gender) will qualify to compete. A nation may enter a maximum of 6 triathletes (three per gender), with the exception of the winners of the 2021 Junior Pan American Games. The host nation (Chile) automatically qualified four athletes (two per gender). All other nations will qualify through various qualifying tournaments and rankings. A further three invitational slots, per gender, will also be awarded. A maximum five nations can enter the maximum of 3 triathletes in each gender.

The top placed mixed relay team not yet qualified at the 2022 South American Games and 2023 Central American and Caribbean Games will each qualify two athletes per gender. The top five teams not qualified at the Pan American Mixed Relays Championship will also qualify two quotas per gender. The rest of the slots will be awarded through the ITU World Ranking as of July 10, 2023 and through wild card slots. An athlete cannot earn more than one slot for their country.

A country may enter the mixed relay competition if it has qualified at least two male and two female triathletes.

== Qualification timeline ==
Events	Date	Venue
2021 Junior Pan American Games	November 26–28	(Colombia) Cali
2022 South American Games	October 2–4	(Paraguay) Asunción
2023 Pan American Mixed Relays Championship	June 18	(Mexico) Huatulco
2023 Central American and Caribbean Games	July 5–7	(El Salvador) San Salvador
ITU World Rankings	July 10, 2023	—N/a
Wildcards	July 15, 2023	—N/a

== Qualification summary ==
NOC	Men	Women	Mixed relay	Total
Argentina	2	2	X	4
Barbados	1	0		1
Bermuda	1	1		2
Bolivia	1	0		1
Brazil	4	3	X	7
Canada	3	3	X	6
Chile	2	2	X	4
Colombia	2	2	X	4
Costa Rica	1	2		3
Cuba	2	2	X	4
Dominican Republic	1	1		2
Ecuador	3	3	X	6
Guatemala	2	2	X	4
Mexico	3	4	X	7
Panama	1	0		1
Puerto Rico	1	1		2
Uruguay	1	1		2
United States	3	3	X	6
Venezuela	2	2	X	4
Total: 19 NOCs	36	34	2	70

== Qualification progress ==
Event	Quotas	Men	Women
Host nation	2	Chile; Chile	Chile; Chile
2021 Junior Pan American Games	1	Miguel Hidalgo (BRA)	Anahi Corral (MEX)
2022 South American Games	2	Brazil; Brazil	Brazil; Brazil
2023 Pan American Mixed Relay Championships	10	United States; United States; Mexico; Mexico; Canada; Canada; Ecuador; Ecuador; Argentina; Argentina	United States; United States; Mexico; Mexico; Canada; Canada; Ecuador; Ecuador; Argentina; Argentina
2023 Central American and Caribbean Games	2	Colombia; Colombia	Colombia; Colombia
ITU World Rankings	16	United States; Mexico; Canada; Brazil; Ecuador; Barbados; Bermuda; Uruguay; Venezuela; Costa Rica; Venezuela; Guatemala; Puerto Rico; Guatemala; Cuba; Cuba	United States; Mexico; Brazil; Ecuador; Costa Rica; Bermuda; Canada; Cuba; Venezuela; Venezuela; Guatemala; Puerto Rico; Guatemala; Costa Rica; Cuba; Dominican Republic
Invitational	3	Bolivia; Dominican Republic; Panama	Uruguay
Total	70	36	34
