= Bicycle kick =

Association football kick

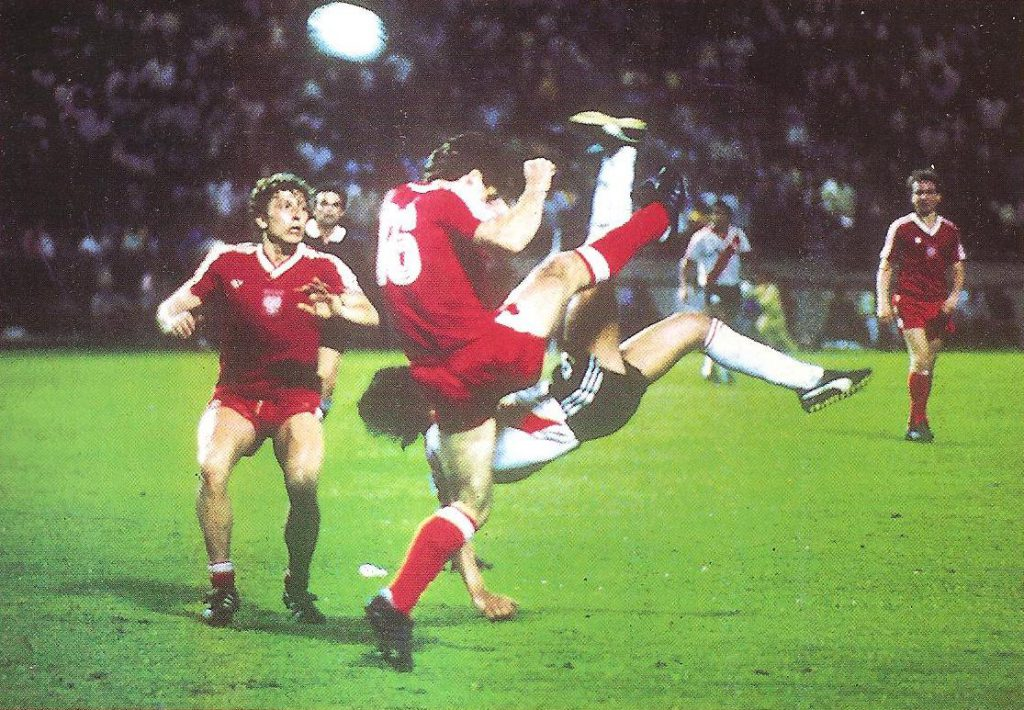
Forward Enzo Francescoli, from River Plate, executes a bicycle kick in a 1986 friendly against Poland national football team.

In association football, a bicycle kick, also known as an overhead kick or scissors kick, is an acrobatic strike where a player kicks an airborne ball rearward in midair. It is achieved by throwing the body backward up into the air and, before descending to the ground, making a shearing movement with the legs to get the ball-striking leg in front of the other. In most languages, the manoeuvre is named after either the cycling motion or the scissor motion that it resembles. Its complexity and rarity in competitive football matches make it one of association football's most celebrated skills. (Note: Turner refers to the bicycle kick as "[t]he apex of wonder-goals", and Witzig defines it as "the most spectacular—yet the most opportunistic and desperate—move that exists in soccer".)

Bicycle kicks can be used defensively to clear away the ball from the goalmouth or offensively to strike at the opponent's goal in an attempt to score. The bicycle kick is an advanced football skill that is dangerous for inexperienced players. Its successful performance has been limited largely to the most experienced and athletic players in football history.

Labourers from the Pacific seaports of Chile and Peru likely performed the first bicycle kicks in football matches, possibly as early as the late 19th century where it became known as the chilena. Advanced techniques like the bicycle kick developed from South American adaptations to the football style introduced by British immigrants. Brazilian footballers Leônidas and Pelé popularized the skill internationally during the 20th century. The bicycle kick has since attained such a wide allure that, in 2016, FIFA (association football's governing body) regarded the bicycle kick as "football's most spectacular sight".

As an iconic skill, bicycle kicks are an important part of association football culture. Executing a bicycle kick in a competitive football match, particularly in scoring a goal, usually garners wide attention in the sports media. The bicycle kick has been featured in works of art, such as sculptures, films, advertisements, and literature. Controversies over the move's invention and naming have added to the kick's acclaim in popular culture. The manoeuvre is also admired in similar ball sports, particularly in the variants of association football like futsal and beach soccer.

== Name ==
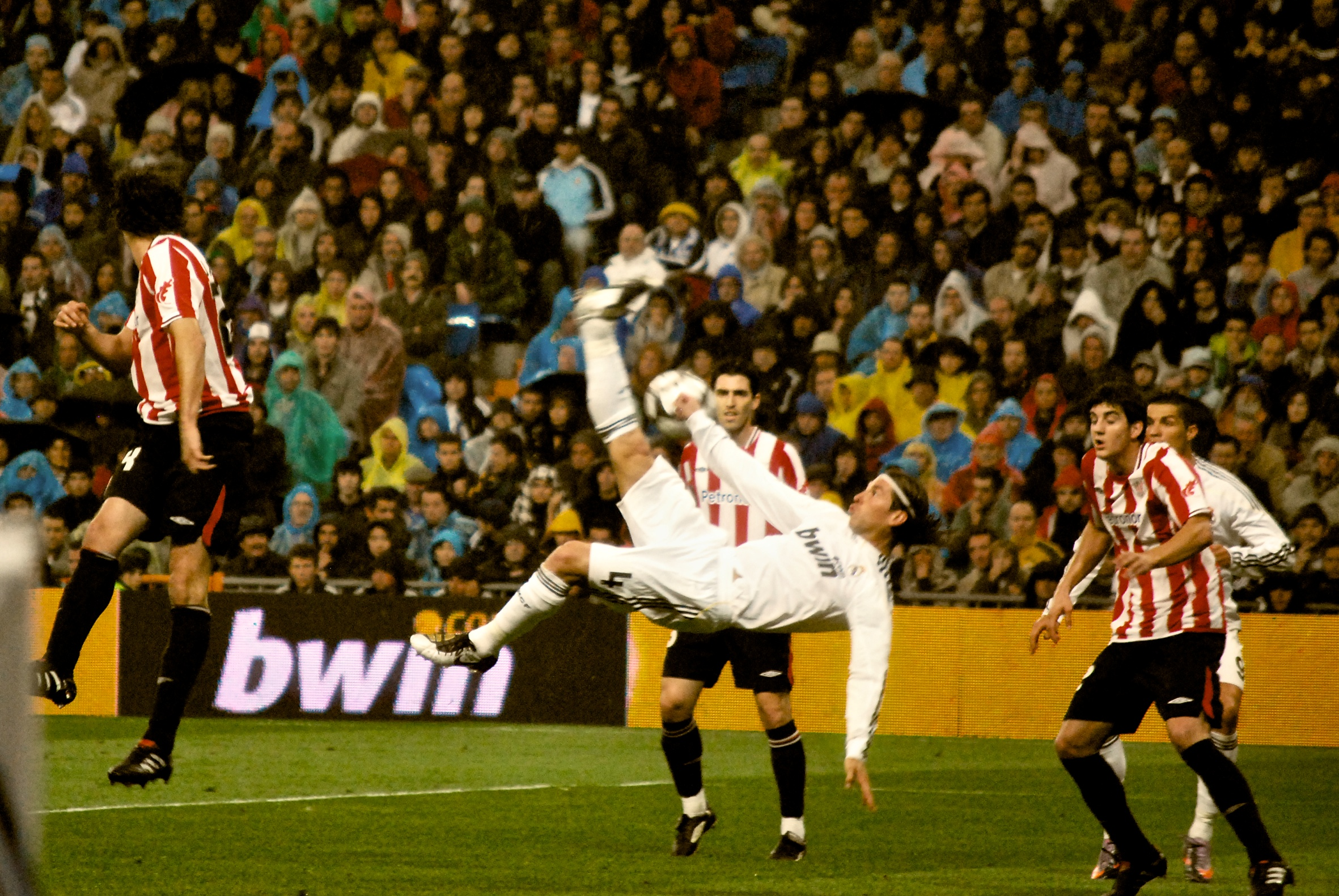
Real Madrid defender Sergio Ramos (in white) uses a bicycle kick against rivals Athletic Bilbao in a La Liga match in 2010.

The bicycle kick is known in English by three names: bicycle kick, overhead kick, and scissors kick. The term "bicycle kick" describes the action of the legs while the body is in mid-air, resembling the pedalling of a bicycle. The manoeuvre is also called an "overhead kick", which refers to the ball being kicked above the head, or a "scissors kick", as the technique reflects the movement of two scissor blades coming together. Some authors differentiate the "scissors kick" as similar to a bicycle kick, but done sideways or at an angle; other authors consider them to be the same move.

In languages other than English, its name also reflects the action it resembles. Sports journalist Alejandro Cisternas, from Chilean newspaper El Mercurio, compiled a list of these names. In most cases, they either refer to the kick's scissor-like motion, such as the French ciseaux retourné (returned scissors) and the Greek anapodo psalidi (upside down scissors), or to its bicycle-like action, such as the Portuguese pontapé de bicicleta. In other languages, the nature of the action is described: German Fallrückzieher (falling backward kick), Polish przewrotka (overturn kick), Dutch omhaal (turnaround drag), and Italian rovesciata (reversed kick).

Exceptions to these naming patterns are found in languages that designate the move by making reference to a location, such as the Norwegian brassespark (Brazilian kick). This exception is most significant in Spanish, where a fierce controversy exists between Chile and Peru—as part of their historic sports rivalry—over the naming of the bicycle kick; Chileans and most Latin Americans know it as the chilena, while Peruvians call it the chalaca. (Note: Argentine sports journalist Jorge Barraza affirms that Peruvians never had a need to call the bicycle kick a chilenita because they had already given their own name to it. In Brazilian football culture, the term chilena means a back heel (a reference to the spurs of Chilean design used in Southern Brazil). In the Spanish newspaper El País, journalist Alberto Lati raised no objection to local names for the move. Simpson and Hesse agree that the move's name should be a matter of personal opinion. Roberto Castro wrote that the bicycle kick's alternate names are synonyms, with no one name definitive.) Regardless, the move is also known in Spanish by the less tendentious names of tijera and tijereta—both a reference to the manoeuvre's scissor-like motion.

== Execution ==
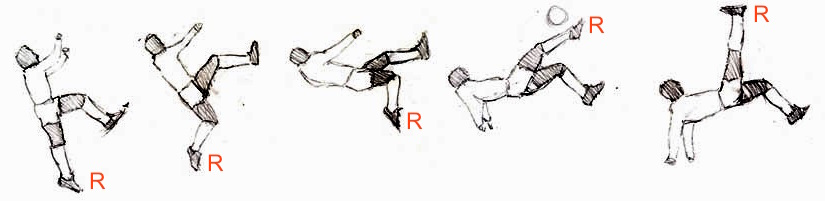
The phases of the execution of a bicycle kick. R = right foot.

A bicycle kick's successful performance generally requires great skill and athleticism. To perform a bicycle kick, the ball must be airborne so that the player can hit it while doing a backflip; the ball can either come in the air towards the player, such as from a cross, or the player can flick the ball up into the air. The non-kicking leg should rise first to help propel the body up while the kicking leg makes the jump. While making the leap, the body's back should move rearwards until it is parallel to the ground. As the body reaches peak height, the kicking leg should snap toward the ball as the non-kicking leg is simultaneously brought down to increase the kick's power. Vision should stay focused on the ball until the foot strikes it. The arms should be used for balance and to diminish the impact from the fall.

Bicycle kicks are generally done in two situations, one defensive and the other offensive. A defensive bicycle kick is done when a player facing their side's goal uses the action to clear the ball in the direction opposite their side's goalmouth. Sports historian Richard Witzig considers defensive bicycle kicks a desperate move requiring less aim than its offensive variety. An offensive bicycle kick is used when a player has their back to the opposing goal and is near the goalmouth. According to Witzig, the offensive bicycle kick requires concentration and a good understanding of the ball's location. Bicycle kicks can also be done in the midfield, but this is not recommended because safer and more accurate passes can be done in this zone.

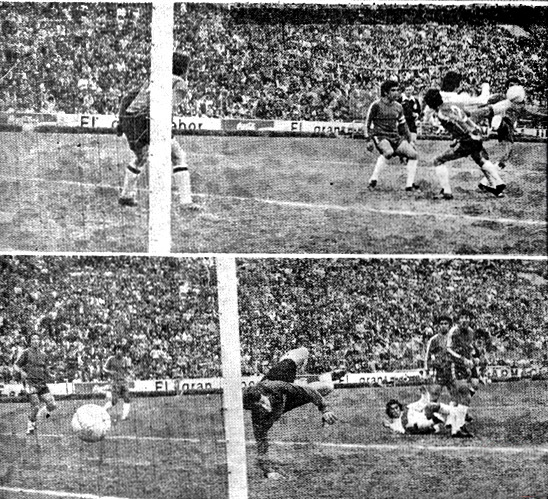
Peru winger Juan Carlos Oblitas scores with a bicycle kick against Chile at Estadio Alejandro Villanueva, during a 1975 Copa América match.

Crosses that precede an offensive bicycle kick are of dubious accuracy—German striker Klaus Fischer reportedly stated that most crosses prior to a bicycle kick are bad. Moreover, performing a bicycle kick is dangerous, even when done correctly, as it may harm a startled participant in the field. For this reason, Peruvian defender César Gonzales recommends that the player executing the bicycle kick have enough space to perform it. For the player using the manoeuvre, the greatest danger happens during the drop; a bad fall can injure the head, back, or wrist. Witzig recommends players attempting the move to land on their upper back, using their arms as support, and simultaneously rolling over to a side in order to diminish impact from the drop.

Witzig recommends that footballers attempt executing a bicycle kick with a focused and determined state of mind. The performer needs to maintain good form when executing the move, and must simultaneously exhibit exceptional accuracy and precision when striking the ball. Brazilian forward Pelé, one of the sport's renowned players, also considered the manoeuvre difficult and recalled having scored from it only a few times out of his 1,283 career goals. Due to the action's complexity, a successfully executed bicycle kick is notable and, according to sports journalist Elliott Turner, prone to awe audiences. An inadequately-executed bicycle kick can also expose a player to ridicule.

== History ==
Football lore has numerous legends relating when and where the bicycle kick was first performed and who created it. (Note: Peruvian football journalist Roberto Castro wrote that it is inherently impossible to know for certain who made the first bicycle kick, as anyone playing with a ball could have done it without it being recorded. According to journalist Diego Pérez, bicycle kicks are currently less common and their origins cloudier.) According to Brazilian anthropologist Antonio Jorge Soares, the bicycle kick's origin is important only as an example of how folklore is created. Popular opinion continues to debate its exact origin, particularly in the locations where the manoeuvre was allegedly created (e.g., Brazil, Chile, and Peru). (Note: In Goal: The New York Times Soccer Blog, journalist Juan Arango wrote that the bicycle kick's origin is a sensitive issue in Peru and Chile. In 2006, Harold Mayne-Nicholls, president of the Football Federation of Chile (FFCh), poked gentle fun at Peruvian insistence on credit for the bicycle kick. That year Mayne-Nicholls' Peruvian Football Federation (FPF) counterpart, Manuel Burga, announced a campaign to verify the bicycle kick's origin in his country. Also in 2006, Peruvian footballer Teófilo Cubillas advised the FPF to patent the manoeuvre with FIFA, and, in 2009, Chilean footballer Sandrino Castec expressed his belief that the Peruvian position was based on anti-Chilean sentiment.) Nevertheless, the available facts and dates tell a straightforward narrative, indicating that the bicycle kick's invention occurred in South America, during an era of innovation in association football tactics and skills.

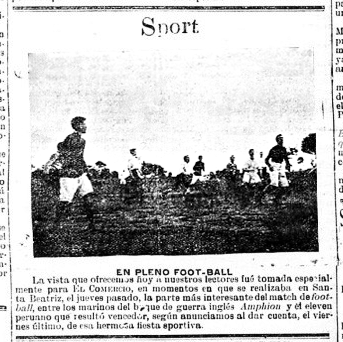
An excerpt from Peru's El Comercio reporting a match between HMS Amphion's crew and a united squad of Lima Cricket/Unión Cricket in 1904. (Note: HMS Amphion arrived at Callao from Panama, and would proceed for repairs to Valparaíso, Chile. The squad from Peru was composed of British and Peruvian footballers from the local clubs Unión Cricket and Lima Cricket—the latter possibly being the oldest club in the Americas that today plays association football. The image reads: "The sight that we offer today to our readers was taken especially for El Comercio, in the moments in which was occurring in Santa Beatriz, this past Thursday, the most interesting part of the football match between sailors from the English warship Amphion and the Peruvian eleven that were victorious, as we had reported when we announced past Friday about this beautiful sports fest".)

British immigrants, attracted by South America's economic prospects, including the export of coffee from Brazil, hide and meat from Argentina, and guano from Peru, introduced football to the region during the 1800s. These immigrant communities founded institutions, such as schools and sporting clubs, where activities mirrored those done in Britain—including the practice of football. Football's practice had previously spread from Britain to continental Europe, principally Belgium, the Netherlands and Scandinavia, but the game had no innovations in these locations. Matters developed differently in South America because, rather than simply imitate the immigrants' style of play—based more on the slower "Scottish passing game" than on the faster and rougher English football style—the South Americans contributed to the sport's growth by emphasizing the players' technical qualities. By adapting the sport to their preferences, South American footballers mastered individual skills like the dribble, bending free kicks, and the bicycle kick.

Bicycle kicks first occurred in the Pacific ports of Chile and Peru, possibly as early as in the late 1800s. While their ships were docked, British mariners played football among themselves and with locals as a form of leisure; the sport's practice was embraced at the ports because its simple rules and equipment made it accessible to the general public. Afro-Peruvian seaport workers may have first performed the bicycle kick during late 19th century matches with British sailors and railroad employees in Peru's chief seaport, where it received the name tiro de chalaca ('Callao strike'). The bicycle kick could also have been first performed in the 1910s by Ramón Unzaga, a Spanish-born Basque athlete who naturalized Chilean, at Chile's seaport of Talcahuano, there receiving the name chorera (alluding the local demonym). (Note: Unzaga's first bicycle kick occurred possibly in 1914 or in 1916. Journalist Luis Osses Guíñez, the author of Talcahuano's football history, argues that Unzaga's first recorded bicycle kick occurred in 1918, as documented by a civil law notary report filed after a heated match between Talcahuano and neighbouring Concepción turned violent. Unzaga, described by Osses Guíñez as a hot-tempered Basque, fistfought a referee who called a foul on the player's bicycle kick. Concepción's newspaper El Sur reported this event a few days after the match, and Unzaga declares in his defense that he had previously executed the manoeuvre in other matches without it being called a foul.)

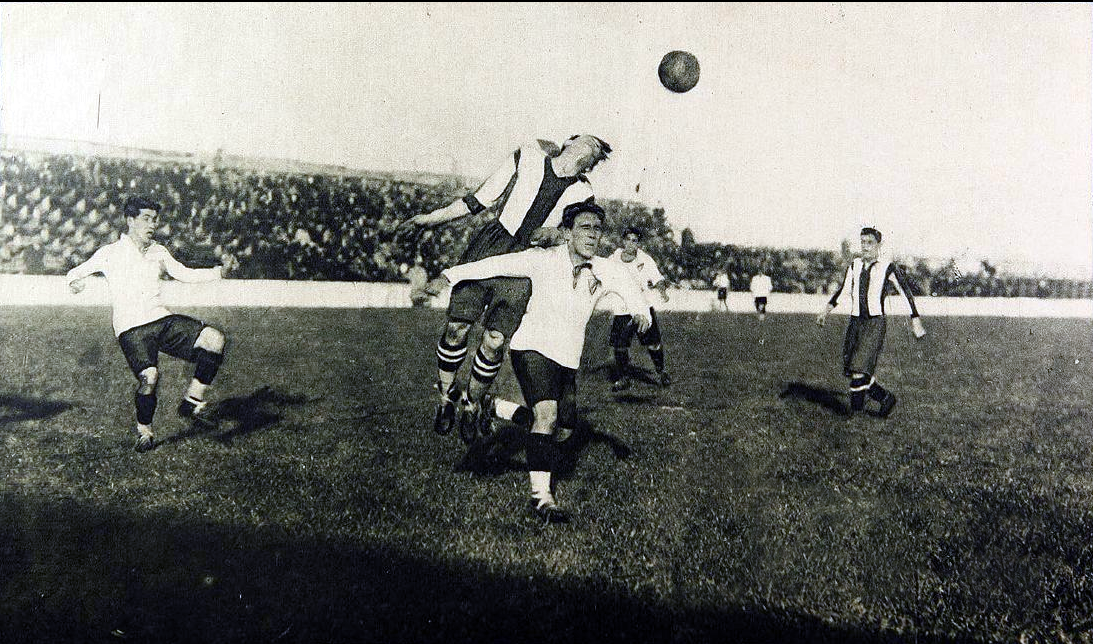
David Arellano (center, white shirt), in a match between Colo-Colo and La Coruña in 1927, is credited with popularizing the move.

Chilean footballers spread the skill beyond west South America in the 1910s and 1920s. In the South American Championship's first editions, Unzaga and fellow Chile defender Francisco Gatica amazed spectators with their bicycle kicks. (Note: Unzaga participated in the Argentina 1916 and Chile 1920 editions of the South American Championship; Gatica participated in the tournament's Uruguay 1917 and Brazil 1919 editions. Gatica's usage of the move to stop an imminent goal garnered him so much attention that the audience credited him with the move's invention.) Chilean forward David Arellano also memorably performed the move and other risky manoeuvres during Colo-Colo's 1927 tour of Spain—his untimely death in that tour from an injury caused by one of his acrobatics is, according to Simpson and Hesse, "a grim warning about the perils of showboating". Impressed by these bicycle kicks, aficionados from Spain and Argentina named it chilena, a reference to the players' nationality. During the 1940s, Carlo Parola popularised the use of the bicycle kick in Italian football, earning the nickname Signor Rovesciata ("Mr. Overhead Kick").

Brazilian forward Pelé rekindled the bicycle kick's international acclaim during the second half of the 20th century. His capability to perform bicycle kicks with ease was one of the traits that made him stand out from other players early in his sports career, and it also boosted his self-confidence as a footballer. After Pelé, Argentine midfielder Diego Maradona and Mexican forward Hugo Sánchez became notable performers of the bicycle kick during the last decades of the 20th century. Other notable players to have performed the move during this period include Peruvian winger Juan Carlos Oblitas, who scored a bicycle kick goal in a 1975 Copa América match between Peru and Chile, and Welsh forward Mark Hughes, who scored from a bicycle kick in a World Cup qualification match played between Wales and Spain in 1985.

Since the beginning of the twenty-first century, the bicycle kick continues to be a skill that is rarely executed successfully in football matches. In 2016, the International Federation of Association Football (FIFA) named the bicycle kick as "football's most spectacular sight" and concluded that, despite its debatable origins and technical explanations, bicycle kicks "have punctuated the history of the game".

== Iconic status ==
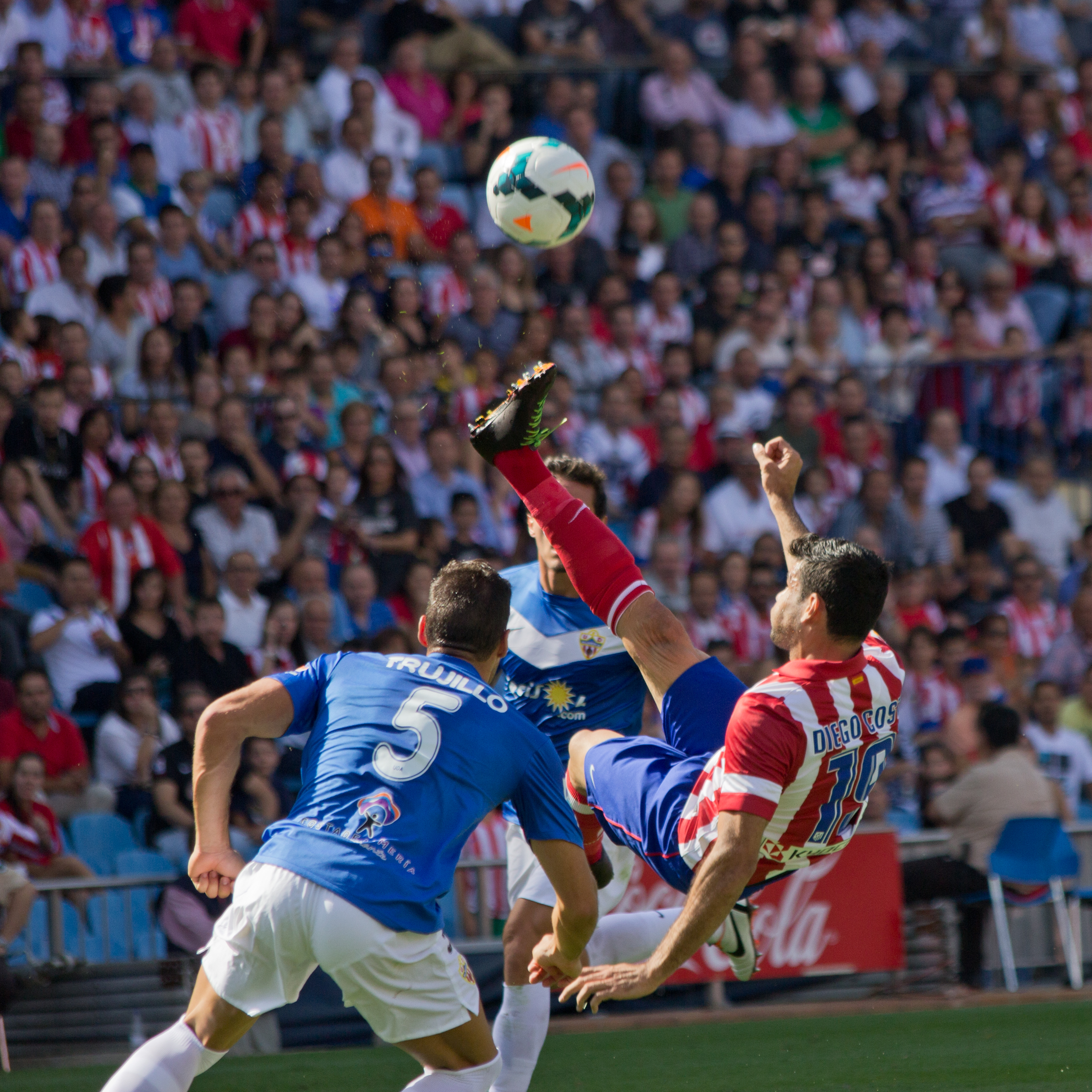
Atlético Madrid striker Diego Costa performing a bicycle kick in a match against Almería in 2013

The bicycle kick retains much appeal among fans and footballers; Hesse and Simpson highlight the positive impact a successful bicycle kick has on player notability, and the United States Soccer Federation describes it as an iconic embellishment of the sport. According to former Manchester City defender Paul Lake, a notable bicycle kick performed by English left winger Dennis Tueart caused injuries to hundreds of fans who tried to emulate it. In 2012, a fan poll from The Guardian awarded English forward Wayne Rooney's 2011 Manchester derby bicycle kick the title of best goal in the Premier League's history. When Italian striker Mario Balotelli, during his youth development years, patterned his skills on those of Brazilian midfielder Ronaldinho and French midfielder Zinedine Zidane, he fixated on the bicycle kick. In 2015 against Liverpool, Juan Mata scored an iconic bicycle kick that secured the win for his team. Portuguese forward Cristiano Ronaldo's Champions League bicycle kick goal, in 2018, received widespread praise from fellow footballers, including English forward Peter Crouch, who tweeted "there is only a few of us who can do that", and Swedish forward Zlatan Ibrahimović, who challenged Ronaldo to "try it from 40 meters"—a reference to his FIFA Puskás Award-winning 2012 bicycle kick goal during an international friendly match between Sweden and England. Gareth Bale's bicycle kick in the 2018 UEFA Champions League final against Liverpool is considered one of the best ever goals.

Some of the most memorable bicycle kicks have been notably performed in the FIFA World Cup finals. (Note: In his autobiography, Pelé expressed regret for not having scored a goal from a bicycle kick in the FIFA World Cup.) German striker Klaus Fischer scored from a bicycle kick in the Spain 1982 World Cup semi-finals match between West Germany and France, tying the score in overtime—the game then went into a penalty shootout, which the German team won. Hesse and Simpson consider Fischer's action the World Cup's most outstanding bicycle kick. In the Mexico 1986 World Cup, Mexican midfielder Manuel Negrete scored from a bicycle kick during the round of 16 match between Mexico and Bulgaria—although overshadowed by "The Goal of the Century" scored by Maradona in the quarter-finals match between Argentina and England, Negrete's goal earned the "World Cup's greatest goal" title by a FIFA fan poll conducted in 2018. Defender Marcelo Balboa's bicycle kick, in the 1994 FIFA World Cup match between Colombia and the United States, received much praise and is even credited with helping launch Major League Soccer in the United States. In the Korea-Japan 2002 World Cup, Belgian attacking midfielder Marc Wilmots scored what English football writer Brian Glanville describes as a "spectacular bicycle kick" against Japan. In the 2022 FIFA World Cup, Brazilian player Richarlison's bicycle kick goal against Serbia was considered one of the best goals of that tournament.

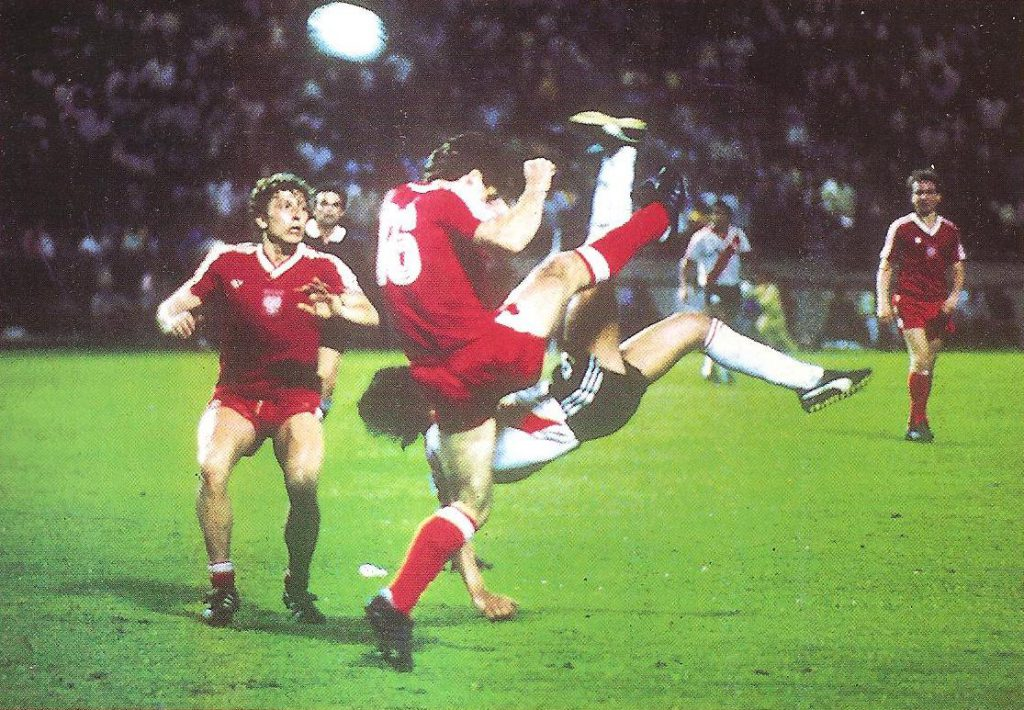
Enzo Francescoli scores for River Plate against Poland with a bicycle kick in 1986

Bicycle kicks are also an important part of football culture. According to the United States Soccer Federation, Pelé's bicycle kick in the 1981 film Escape to Victory is a textbook execution of the skill, and Pelé expressed satisfaction with his attempt to "show off" for the film in his autobiography. A Google Doodle in September 2013, celebrating Leônidas da Silva's 100th birthday, prominently featured a bicycle kick performed by a stick figure representing the popular Brazilian forward. Bicycle kicks have also been featured in advertisements such as a 2014 television commercial where Argentine forward Lionel Messi executes the manoeuvre to promote that year's FIFA football simulation video game. In 2022, FIFA, through its official Twitter account in Spanish, rekindled the controversial origin of the bicycle kick asking users if the maneuver was a "chalaca" or a "chilena" (alluding to the dispute between Peruvians and Chileans).

A monument to the bicycle kick executed by Ramón Unzaga was erected in Talcahuano, Chile, in 2014; created by sculptor María Angélica Echavarri, the statue is composed of copper and bronze and measures three meters in diameter. A statue in honor of Manuel Negrete's bicycle kick is planned for the Coyoacán district of Mexico City. The Uruguayan novelist Eduardo Galeano wrote about the bicycle kick in his book Soccer in Sun and Shadow, praising Unzaga as the inventor. The Peruvian Nobel laureate writer Mario Vargas Llosa has the protagonist in The Time of the Hero's Spanish edition declare that the bicycle kick must have been invented in Callao, Peru.

The manoeuvre is also admired in variants of association football, such as beach soccer and futsal. In 2015, Italian beach soccer forward Gabriele Gori reportedly stated about the bicycle kick that "[i]t comes down to an awful lot of training". An action like the bicycle kick is also used in sepak takraw, a sport whose objective is to kick a ball over a net and into the opposing team's side.

== See also ==
- Association football tactics and skills
- History of association football
- Scorpion kick (reverse bicycle kick)

== Bibliography ==
- Bellos, Alex (2014). Futebol: The Brazilian Way of Life. London: Bloomsburry Publish Plc. ISBN 978-1-4088-5416-7.
- Bischops, Klaus; Gerards, Heinz-Willi (2003). Soccer Training for Girls. Translated by Anne Lammert. Oxford, UK: Meyer & Meyer. ISBN 978-1-84126-097-6.
- Borden, Sam (2009). The Complete Idiot's Guide to Soccer Basics. Indianapolis: Alpha Books. ISBN 978-1-59257-830-6.
- Bravo, Gonzalo (2012). "Association Football, Pacific Coast of South America". In Nauright, John; Parrish, Charles (eds.). Sports Around the World: History, Culture, and Practice. Vol. 3. Santa Barbara: ABC-Clio. ISBN 978-1-59884-301-9.
- Burns, Jimmy (2012). Roja: A Journey Through Spanish Football. London: Simon & Schuster UK Ltd. ISBN 978-0-85720-652-7.
- Caioli, Luca (2015). Balotelli: The Remarkable Story Behind the Sensational Headlines. London: Icon Books, Ltd. ISBN 978-1-84831-913-4.
- Coleman, Lori (2000). Soccer. Minneapolis: Lerner Publications Company. ISBN 978-0-8225-9876-3.
- Coppock, Patrick (2001). The Semiotics of Writing: Transdisciplinary Perspectives on the Technology of Writing. Oakville, Connecticut: The David Brown Book Company. ISBN 978-2-503-51241-9.
- Crego, Robert (2003). Sports and Games of the 18th and 19th Centuries. Westport, Connecticut: Greenwood Press. ISBN 978-0-313-31610-4.
- Cunha, Loris Baena (1994). A Verdadeira História do Futebol Brasileiro [The Real Story of Brazilian Football] (in Portuguese). Rio de Janeiro: ABRADE.
- "Essential Soccer Skills: Key Tips and Techniques to Improve Your Game". Essential Soccer Skills. New York: DK Publishing. 2011. ISBN 978-0-7566-5902-8.
- Foot, John (2007). Winning at All Costs: A Scandalous History of Italian Soccer. New York: Nation Books. ISBN 978-1-56858-368-6.
- Freedman, Lew (2014). Pelé: A Biography. Santa Barbara: Greenwood Biographies. ISBN 978-1-4408-2980-2.
- Freire, Marcus Vinicius; Ribeiro, Deborah (2006). Ouro Olímpico [Olympic Gold]. Rio de Janeiro: Casa Da Palavra. ISBN 978-85-7734-028-6.
- Friedman, Ian (2007). Latino Athletes. New York: Facts on File, Inc. ISBN 978-0-8160-6384-0.
- Gardner, Paul (1994). The Simplest Game. Springfield, Ohio: Collier Books. ISBN 978-0-02-043225-8.
- Giulianotti, Richard; Robertson, Roland (2009). Globalization and Football. London: SAGE Publications. ISBN 978-1-4129-2127-5.
- Glanville, Brian (1968). Soccer: A History of the Game, Its Players, and Its Strategy. New York City: Crown Publishing Group. ISBN 978-0-517-50796-4.
- Glanville, Brian (2010). The Story of the World Cup: The Essential Companion to South Africa 2010. London: Faber & Faber. ISBN 978-0-571-23605-3.
- Goldblatt, David (2008). The Ball is Round. New York: Riverhead Trade. ISBN 978-1-59448-296-0.
- Henshaw, Richard (1979). The Encyclopedia of World Soccer. Washington, D.C.: New Republic Books. ISBN 978-0-915220-34-2.
- Lake, Paul (2012). I'm Not Really Here: A Life of Two Halves. London: Random House. ISBN 978-0-09-955325-0.
- Lisi, Clemente (2015). A History of the World Cup: 1930–2014. Lanham, Maryland: Rowman & Littlefield. ISBN 978-0-8108-7753-5.
- Natali, Marcos (2007). "The Realm of the Possible: Remembering Brazilian Futebol". In Sean Brown (ed.). Football Fans Around the World: From Supporters to Fanatics. New York City: Routledge. ISBN 978-0-415-39505-2.
- O'Brien, Richard (2005). The Ultimate Sports Handbook. Philadelphia: Quirk Books. ISBN 978-1-59474-034-3.
- Orejan, Jaime (2011). Football/Soccer: History and Tactics. Jefferson, North Carolina: McFarland & Company, Inc. ISBN 978-0-7864-4784-8.
- Páez, Pedro Fernando; Pineda, Daniel (2015). Copa América de Fútbol: 100 Años de Historia, Anécdotas y Curiosidades [Football's Copa America: 100 Years of History, Anecdotes, and Curiosities] (in Spanish). Bogota: Bilineata Publishing. ISBN 978-958-8839-19-6.
- Pelé (2006). Pelé: The Autobiography. London: Simon & Schuster UK Ltd. ISBN 978-1-84739-488-0.
- Pelé; Fish, Robert (2007). My Life and the Beautiful Game. New York: Skyhorse Publishing. ISBN 978-1-60239-196-3.
- Quitián Roldán, David Leonardo (2006). Fútbol Sin Barrera [Football Without Barriers] (in Spanish). Armenia, Colombia: Editorial Kinesis. ISBN 978-958-8269-12-2.
- Reyes Coca, Marco Aurelio (2013). "Deportes Masivos: Subproducto de la Inmigración Extranjera en Chillán, 1850-1910". In Jara, Marcelo; Lopez, Felipe (eds.). Migraciones: Una mirada interdisciplinaria. Concepción, Chile: El Sur Impresores. ISBN 978-956-353-317-0.
- Rinaldi, George (2016). Calcio's Greatest Forwards. Durrington, England: Pitch Publishing. ISBN 978-1-78531-118-5.
- Ruiz, Laureano (2003). The Spanish Soccer Coaching Bible. Vol. 2. Spring City, Pennsylvania: Reedswain Inc. ISBN 978-1-59164-022-6.
- Rull, Nomdedeu (2004). Terminología del Fútbol y Diccionarios: Elaboración de un diccionario de especialidad para el gran público [Terminology of Football and Dictionaries: Elaboration of a Specialized Dictionary for the General Public] (PhD). Universitat Autònoma de Barcelona. ISBN 978-84-689-0939-4.
- Schmidt, Colin (1997). Advanced Soccer Drills: 69 Drills for Techniques and Tactics. Champaign, Illinois: Human Kinetics. ISBN 978-0-88011-614-5.
- Simpson, Paul; Hesse, Uli (2013). Who Invented the Stepover?. London: Profile Books Ltd. ISBN 978-1-78125-006-8.
- Soares, Antonio Jorge (2012). "História E A Invenção De Tradições No Futebol Brasileiro" [The History and Invention of Brazilian Football Traditions]. In Ronaldo Helal; Antonio Jorge Soares; Hugo Lovisolo (eds.). A Invenção Do País Do Futebol [The Invention of the Football Nation] (in Portuguese) (2nd ed.). Rio de Janeiro: Editora Mauad X. ISBN 978-85-7478-620-9.
- Stein, Steve (2011). "The Case of Soccer in Early Twentieth-Century Lima". In Stavans, Ilan (ed.). Fútbol. Santa Barbara: ABC-CLIO, LLC. ISBN 978-0-313-37515-6.
- Sutherland, Sasha (2012). "Latin America and the Caribbean". In John Nauright; Charles Parrish (eds.). Sports around the World: History, Culture, and Practice. Vol. 1. Santa Barbara, California: ABC-CLIO. ISBN 978-1-59884-300-2.
- Turner, Elliott (2011). An Illustrated Guide to Soccer and Spanish. n.p.: Round Ball Media LLC. ISBN 978-0-615-48583-6.
- Tyagi, Arun Kumar (2010). Football: Skills and Rules. New Delhi: KSK Publisher. ISBN 978-81-7524-572-3.
- United States Soccer Federation; Lewis, Michael (2000). Soccer For Dummies. Hoboken, New Jersey: Wiley Publishing. ISBN 978-0-7645-5229-8.
- Wahl, Grant (2010). The Beckham Experiment. New York City: Three Rivers Press. ISBN 978-0-307-40859-4.
- Wilson, Jonathan (2013). Inverting The Pyramid: The History of Soccer Tactics. New York: Nation Books. ISBN 978-1-56858-738-7.
- Witzig, Richard (2006). The Global Art of Soccer. Harahan, Louisiana: CusiBoy Publishing. ISBN 978-0-9776688-0-9.
