= 2023 Central American and Caribbean Games =

24th edition of the Central American and Caribbean Games

- Emblem of the 2023 Central American and Caribbean Games
- Host city: San Salvador
- Country: El Salvador
- Motto: It's time to transcend Spanish: Es momento de trascender
- Nations: 35
- Athletes: 5377
- Events: 434 in 37 sports (52 disciplines)
- Opening: 23 June 2023
- Closing: 8 July 2023
- Opened by: President Nayib Bukele
- Athlete's Oath: Ivonne Soler (beach volleyball); Uriel Canjura (badminton)
- Judge's Oath: Mario Granados (basketball); Gladys Mejía (swimming)
- Main venue: Estadio Nacional Jorge "El Mágico" Gonzalez (Opening ceremony); Estadio Héroes y Mártires UES (Closing ceremony)
- Website: sansalvador2023.com

The 2023 Central American and Caribbean Games (Spanish: Juegos Deportivos Centroamericanos y del Caribe San Salvador 2023), also known as the 24th Central American and Caribbean Games and commonly known as San Salvador 2023, was the 24th edition of the Central American and Caribbean Games, a quadrennial sports multi-sport event which was held from 23 June to 8 July 2023 in San Salvador, El Salvador.

They were planned to take place in Panama City, Panama, until the government announced on 24 July 2020 that it had decided to withdraw as the hosts as a result of the COVID-19 pandemic in Panama. Centro Caribe Sports had search for alternatives. In May 2021 San Salvador, El Salvador was chosen to replace Panama City as main host city, as due to infrastructure and schedule issues 7 sports were relocated to Santo Domingo, in Dominican Republic.

Chess and Netball made its debut in the Central American and Caribbean Games.

== Bidding process ==
Panama City had presented itself as the only candidate to organize the 2022 Central American and Caribbean Games and also announced the commitment of the Panamanian State to invest 200 million dollars for both infrastructure and the organization of the event.

One of the advantages presented by the Panamanian delegation to Centro Caribe Sports was that it would not be necessary to build an athletes' village for the event, because instead the athletes would be hosted in hotels. On 3 February 2017, Centro Caribe Sports announced that Panama City would host the event. It would have been the third time: Panama City first hosted the Central American and Caribbean Games in 1938 and then in 1970.

On 24 July 2020, Panama announced that it was withdrawing as the host of the 2022 event as a result of the COVID-19 pandemic.

Centro Caribe Sports expressed its surprise at the sudden withdrawal and assured that the event will still take place in 2022. It said the executive committee would meet on 25 July 2020 to discuss the issue and begin a search for solutions and alternatives.

On 15 November 2020, Mayagüez, Puerto Rico presented a bid to host the games conditioned that it receive financial support from the Financial Oversight and Management Board for Puerto Rico. Mayagüez previously held the games in 2010, and thus would not have to invest as much on infrastructure since it would reuse most of the facilities.

2023 Central American and Caribbean Games bidding results
City	Country	CACSO votes
Mayagüez	Puerto Rico	
San Salvador	El Salvador	

== Development and preparation ==
=== Venues ===
Due to infrastructure and calendar issues 7 sports were relocated to Santo Domingo in Dominican Republic: taekwondo, modern pentathlon, equestrian, canoeing, shooting, racquetball and field hockey.

San Salvador zone (thirty-one sports)

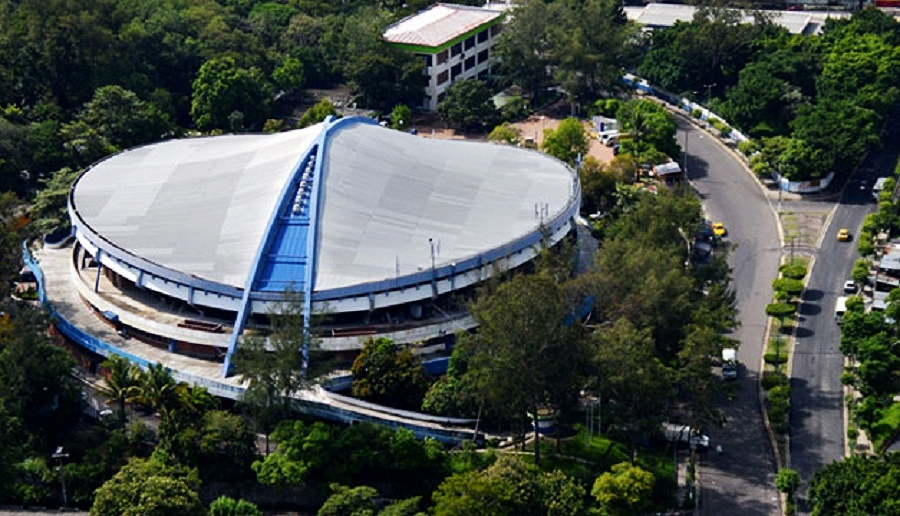
Palacio de los Deportes Carlos "El Famoso" Hernández before the renovations

Venue	Events	Capacity	Status
Estadio Nacional Jorge "El Mágico" Gonzalez	Athletics (track and field)	35,000	Renovated
Estadio Nacional Jorge "El Mágico" Gonzalez	Shooting	35,000	Renovated
Estadio Nacional Jorge "El Mágico" Gonzalez	Opening ceremony	35,000	Renovated
Palacio de los Deportes Carlos "El Famoso" Hernández	Volleyball (men's and women's)	6,000	Renovated
Palacio de los Deportes Carlos "El Famoso" Hernández	Karate	6,000	Renovated
Complejo Deportivo El Polvorín	Table tennis	2,000	Renovated
Complejo Deportivo El Polvorín	Aquatics (diving, artistic swimming)	2,000	Renovated
Complejo Deportivo El Polvorín	Badminton	2,000	Renovated
Complejo Deportivo El Polvorín	Speed skating	2,000	Renovated
Complejo Deportivo El Polvorín	Cycling (Track)	2,000	Renovated
Gimnasio Nacional José Adolfo Pineda	Basketball	12,500	Renovated
Estadio de Sóftbol Pablo Guzmán	Softball (men's and women's)	3,000	Renovated
Parque de Pelota Saturnino Bengoa	Baseball	4,000	Renovated
Coliseo UES	Fencing		Additional
Avenida Jerusalem	Cycling (Road)		Existing
Plaza Gerardo Barrios	3×3 basketball		Existing
Plaza Gerardo Barrios	Boxing		Existing
Salon Hotel Terraza	Bodybuliding		Existing
Salon Hotel Terraza	Chess		Existing
Piscina Olímpica	Swimming		Renovated
Piscina Olímpica	Water polo		Renovated
Circuito Urbano Frente a Metrocenter	Athletics (race walk)		Existing
Circuito Urbano Árbol de La Paz	Athletics (marathon)		Existing
Fosa de Clavados Complejo Deportivo El Polvorín	Aquatics (diving, artistic swimming)		Existing
Universidad de El Salvador	Athletics (marathon)		Renovated
Teatro Presidente	Bodybuliding	1,429	Existing
Estadio de Playa Flor Blanca	Beach soccer	1,800	Additional
Estadio de Playa Flor Blanca	Beach volleyball	1,800	Additional
Complejo Deportivo Flor Blanca	Weightlifting	1,800	Additional
Complejo Deportivo Flor Blanca	Beach volleyball	1,800	Additional
Complejo Deportivo Flor Blanca	Netball	1,800	Additional
La Cuna del Mágico	Wrestling		Additional
Velódromo Nacional	Speed skating	2,000	Existing
Estadio Héroes y Mártires UES	Rugby sevens	10,000	Renovated
Estadio Héroes y Mártires UES	Closing ceremony	10,000	Renovated
Colonia Guatemala	Softball (women's)		Existing

Ciudad Merliot zone (five sports)

Venue	Events	Capacity	Status
Complejo Deportivo de Ciudad Merliot	Water polo	1,800	Renovated
Complejo Deportivo de Ciudad Merliot	Archery	1,800	Renovated
Complejo Deportivo de Ciudad Merliot	Gymnastics (artistic, rhythmic, trampoline)	1,800	Renovated
Complejo Deportivo de Ciudad Merliot	Tennis	1,800	Renovated
Poligono de Tiro	Shooting		Renovated
Canachas de Tenis Complejo Deportivo de Ciudad Merliot	Tennis		Renovated

Ilopango zone (four sports)

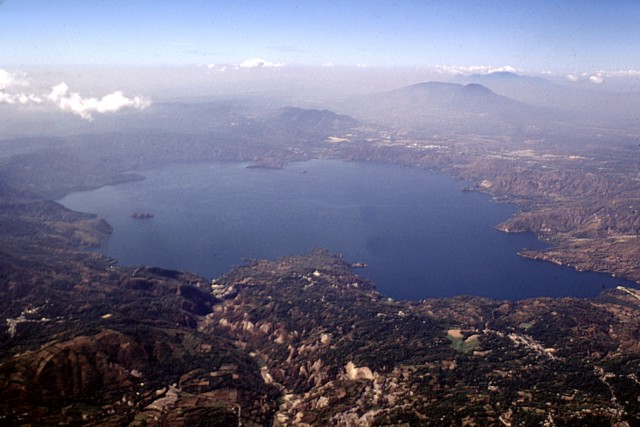
Lago Ilopango

Venue	Events	Capacity	Status
Lago Ilopango	Rowing		Renovated
Parque Recreativo Apulo	Open water swimming		Renovated
Parque Recreativo Apulo	Sailing		Renovated
Club Salvadoreño	Rowing		Existing

La Libertad zone (three sports)

Venue	Events	Capacity	Status
Punta Roca	Surfing		Existing
Surf City	Surfing		Existing
Colegio San Francisco	Volleyball (women's)		Existing

Santa Tecla zone (three sports)

Venue	Events	Capacity	Status
Estadio Nacional Las Delicias	Football	10,000	Renovated
Ecoparque El Espino	Cycling (BMX)		Existing
Polígono de Tiro con Arco "Jorge Jiménez"	Archery		Existing

Mejicanos zone (two sports)

Venue	Events	Capacity	Status
Villa CARI	Bowling		Renovated
Division Transito Terrestre	Athletics (marathon)		Existing

San José Villanueva zone (one sport)

Venue	Events	Capacity	Status
Club El Encanto	Golf		Existing

Soyapango (one sport)

Venue	Events	Capacity	Status
Multigimnasio Don Bosco	Handball		Renovated

Outlying (thirteen sports)

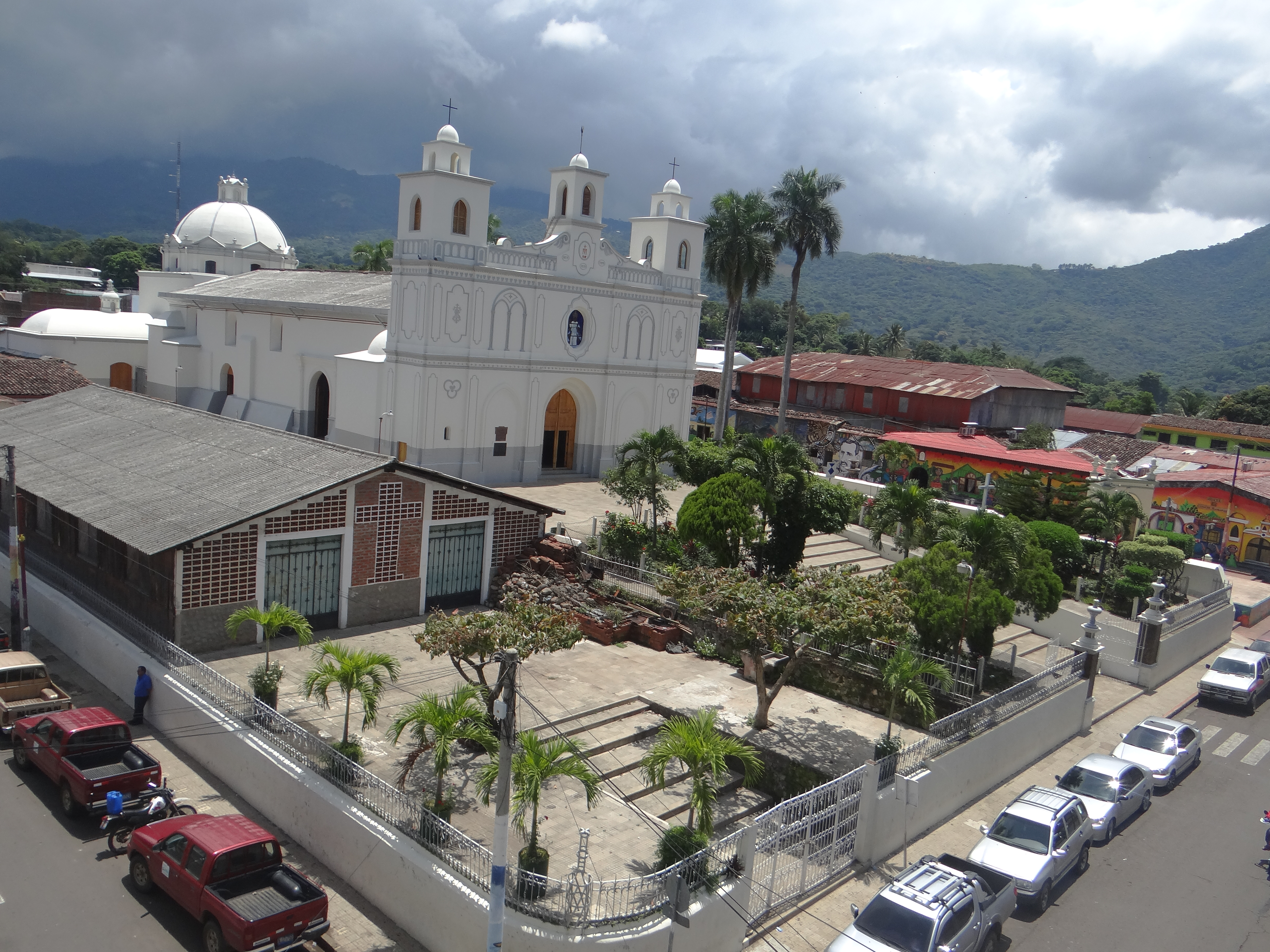
Ahuachapán

Venue	Events	Capacity	Status
Coliseo de Bádminton (Ahuachapán)	Badminton		Existing
Duela de Voleibol (Chalchuapa)	Netball		Existing
Duela de Voleibol (Chalchuapa)	Weightlifting		Existing
Comalapa (Comalapa)	Cycling (Mountain biking)		Existing
Punta Roca (La Libertad)	Surfing		Existing
Costa del Sol (San Luis La Herradura)	Triathlon		Existing
Centro Ecuestre Palmarejo (Santo Domingo)	Equestrian (Dressage, eventing, jumping)		Existing
Centro de Remo y Canotaje Presa de Rincón (Sabana del Puerto, Monseñor Nouel)	Canoeing		Existing
Estadio de Hockey del Parque del Este (Santo Domingo)	Field hockey		Existing
Centro Olímpico Juan Pablo Duarte (Santo Domingo)	Modern pentathlon		Existing
Centro Olímpico Juan Pablo Duarte (Santo Domingo)	Racquetball		Existing
Centro Olímpico Juan Pablo Duarte (Santo Domingo)	Taekwondo		Existing
Polígono de Tiro al Plato El Higuero (Santo Domingo)	Shooting		Existing

Non-competitive

Venue	Events	Capacity	Status
Villa Centroamericana y del Caribe	Central American and Caribbean Games Village		Additional
Villa Centroamericana y del Caribe	Media Village		Additional
Villa Centroamericana y del Caribe	International Broadcast Centre		Additional
Villa Centroamericana y del Caribe	Main Press Centre		Additional

=== Volunteers ===
The National Volunteer Committee of the Salvadoran 2023 Central American and Caribbean Games Organizing Committee announced the recruitment of nearly 4,000 volunteers to assist at the Central American and Caribbean Games.

== Torch relay ==
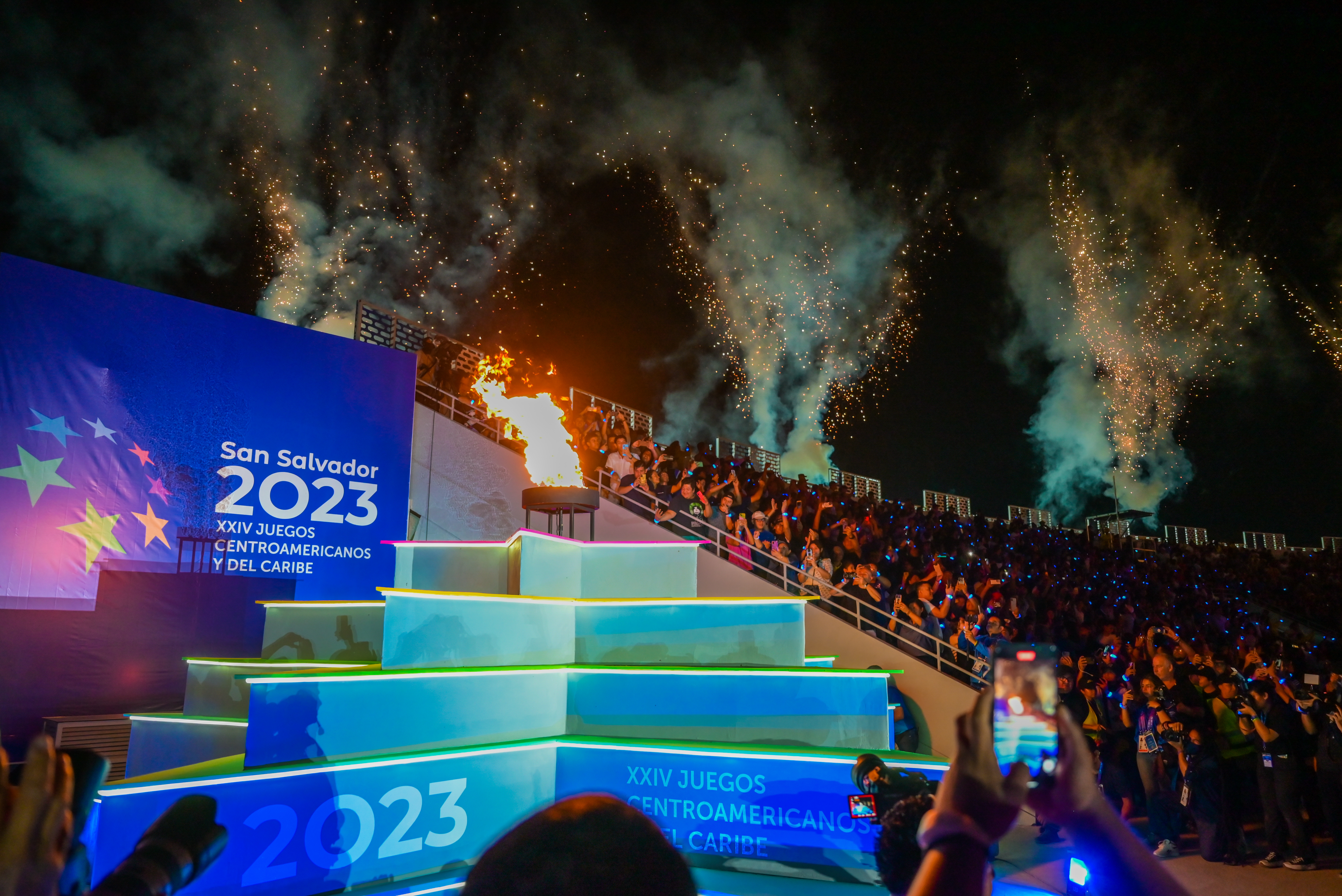
Central American Caribbean Torch at the opening ceremony

The 2023 Central American and Caribbean Games torch relay was from 6 June to 23 June 2023. After being lit in Teotihuacán, Mexico, the torch traveled to San Salvador on the 23 June. The Salvadoran leg began in the Aeropuerto Internacional de El Salvador in San Luis Talpa and will end in Estadio Nacional Jorge "El Mágico" Gonzalez, the main venue of the 2023 Central American and Caribbean Games. It visited more than 60 Salvadoran cities and towns, including all 14 state capitals. The end of the relay was the closing to the 2023 Central American and Caribbean Games opening ceremony.

== Participating countries ==
The following nations participated:

Participating National Olympic Committees
- Antigua and Barbuda (13)
- Aruba (29)
- Bahamas (46)
- Barbados (113)
- Belize (12)
- Bermuda (48)
- British Virgin Islands (9)
- Cayman Islands (33)
- Centro Caribe Sports (356)^{[a]}
- Colombia (405)
- Costa Rica (287)
- Cuba (489)
- Curaçao (48)
- Dominica (6)
- Dominican Republic (457) (sub host)
- El Salvador (495) (host)
- Grenada (10)
- Guadeloupe (12)
- Guyana (54)
- Haiti (57)
- Honduras (103)
- Jamaica (172)
- Martinique (12)
- Mexico (643)
- Nicaragua (158)
- Panama (147)
- Puerto Rico (396)
- Saint Kitts and Nevis (7)
- Saint Lucia (24)
- Saint Vincent and the Grenadines (19)
- Suriname (30)
- Trinidad and Tobago (181)
- Turks and Caicos Islands (6)
- United States Virgin Islands (50)
- Venezuela (450)

^{[a]} Because the International Olympic Committee suspended the Guatemalan Olympic Committee on 15 October 2022, Guatemalan athletes are competing as Independent Olympic Athletes and are using the Centro Caribe Sports flag.

== Games ==
=== Parade of Nations ===
The opening ceremony for the games was held on 23 June 2023, although the boxing tournament commenced one day earlier on 22 June 2023. The table tennis and beach volleyball tournaments commenced one two days earlier, on 21 June 2023. Only flagbearers took part in the parade of nations. French Guiana and Sint Maarten, did not take part in the parade; their flags are not hoisted in the athletes village.

=== Sports ===
The following competitions are scheduled to place:

2023 Central American and Caribbean Games
- Aquatics
  - Artistic swimming (9)
  - Diving (12)
  - Open water swimming (5)
  - Swimming (43)
  - Water polo (2)
- Archery (10)
- Athletics (27)
- Badminton (4)
- Baseball (1)
- Basketball
  - Basketball (2)
  - 3×3 basketball (2)
- Beach soccer (2)
- Bowling (10)
- Boxing (13)
- Canoeing (12)
- Chess (8)
- Cycling
  - BMX (2)
  - Mountain biking (2)
  - Road (2)
  - Track (2)
- Equestrian
  - Dressage (3)
  - Eventing (2)
  - Jumping (4)
- Fencing (6)
- Field hockey (2)
- Football (2)
- Golf (2)
- Gymnastics
  - Artistic (14)
  - Rhythmic (9)
  - Trampoline (4)
- Handball (2)
- Judo (28)
- Karate (12)
- Modern pentathlon (5)
- Netball (1)
- Racquetball (7)
- Rowing (13)
- Rugby sevens (2)
- Sailing (7)
- Shooting (25)
- Softball (2)
- Speed skating (7)
- Surfing (6)
- Table tennis (7)
- Taekwondo (14)
- Tennis (7)
- Triathlon (5)
- Volleyball
  - Volleyball (2)
  - Beach volleyball (2)
- Weightlifting (16)
- Wrestling (18)

== Calendar ==
The edition of the schedule was published by National Olympic Committee of El Salvador.

All times and dates use Atlantic Standard Time and Central Standard Time (UTC-4 and UTC-6)

OC	Opening ceremony	●	Event competitions	1	Event finals	CC	Closing ceremony

June/July		21st Wed	22nd Thu	23rd Fri	24th Sat	25th Sun	26th Mon	27th Tue	28th Wed	29th Thu	30th Fri	1st Sat	2nd Sun	3rd Mon	4th Tue	5th Wed	6th Thu	7th Fri	8th Sat	Medal Events
Ceremonies				OC															CC	—N/a
Aquatics	Artistic swimming				2	2	2	2	1											67
Aquatics	Diving											2	1	2	1	2	2			67
Aquatics	Open water swimming															2	1	2		67
Aquatics	Swimming				7	7	4	8	8	8										67
Aquatics	Water polo											●	●	●		●	●	1		67
Archery													●	2	2	●	3	3		10
Athletics													4	8	6	9	11	9		47
Badminton												●	●	1	●	●	●	5		6
Baseball/Softball
Baseball/Softball	Baseball				●	●	●	●	●	●	●	1								1
Baseball/Softball	Softball				●	●	●	●	●	1			●	●	●	●	●	1		2
Basketball	Basketball				●	●	●	●	1			●	●	●	●	1				4
Basketball	3×3 Basketball										●	●	2							4
Beach soccer													●	●	●		●	1		1
Bowling									1	1	1	1	1	1	4					10
Boxing			●	●	●	●	●		13											13
Canoeing																	4	3	2	9
Chess														●	●	4	4			8
Cycling	Road cycling															2		2		20
Cycling	Track cycling								2	2	3	●	5							20
Cycling	BMX																	2		20
Cycling	Mountain biking																		2	20
Equestrian					●	●	1	●	1		2		1	1		2				8
Fencing													2	2	2	2	2	2		12
Field hockey								●	●	●	●	●	●	●	●	1	1			2
Football									●	●	●	●	●	●	●	●	1	1		2
Golf															●	●	●	2		2
Gymnastics	Artistic				1	1	2	5	5											26
Gymnastics	Rhythmic											●	3	6						26
Gymnastics	Trampolining																2	1		26
Handball					●	●	●		●	1			●	●	●		●	1		2
Judo					5	4	5	1												15
Karate																	4	5	3	12
Modern pentathlon					●	1	1	1	2											5
Netball														●	●	●	●	1		1
Racquetball					●	●	●	●	●	5	●	2								7
Rowing					●	●	4	4	4											12
Rugby sevens						●	●	2												2
Sailing							●			●	●	6								6
Shooting						4		4	1		4	1	4	2	1	1	2			24
Speed skating															2	6	2	4		14
Surfing					●	●	●	●	4	2										6
Table tennis		●	●	2	1	2	●	2												7
Taekwondo															4	4	4	2		14
Tennis												●	●	●	3	2	●	2		7
Triathlon																4		1		5
Volleyball	Beach volleyball	●	●	●	●	●	●	2												4
Volleyball	Volleyball								●	●	●	●	1		●	●	●	●	1	4
Weightlifting					10	8	8	6												32
Wrestling										6	6	6								18
Daily medal events		0	0	2	26	29	27	37	43	26	16	19	24	25	25	42	43	51	8	443
Cumulative total		0	0	2	28	57	84	121	164	190	206	225	249	274	299	341	384	435	443	443
June/July 2023		21st Wed	22nd Thu	23rd Fri	24th Sat	25th Sun	26th Mon	27th Tue	28th Wed	29th Thu	30th Fri	1st Sat	2nd Sun	3rd Mon	4th Tue	5th Wed	6th Thu	7th Fri	8th Sat	Total events
June/July 2023		July										August								Total events

== Medal table ==
* Host nation (El Salvador)

2023 Central American and Caribbean Games medal table
Rank	Nation	Gold	Silver	Bronze	Total
1	Mexico	145	108	100	353
2	Colombia	87	92	65	244
3	Cuba	74	59	63	196
4	Venezuela	32	46	80	158
5	Dominican Republic	25	36	50	111
6	Puerto Rico	25	27	44	96
7	Centro Caribe Sports	17	27	35	79
8	Trinidad and Tobago	8	7	4	19
9	El Salvador*	8	3	17	28
10	Panama	5	6	12	23
11	Costa Rica	4	9	20	33
12	Aruba	3	7	6	16
13	Jamaica	2	6	11	19
14	Barbados	2	2	5	9
15	Virgin Islands	2	0	0	2
16	Nicaragua	1	1	4	6
17	Bahamas	1	1	2	4
18	Saint Lucia	1	1	1	3
19	Saint Vincent and the Grenadines	1	0	2	3
20	Guyana	1	0	0	1
21	Bermuda	0	2	4	6
22	Haiti	0	1	1	2
23	Cayman Islands	0	1	0	1
23	Curaçao	0	1	0	1
25	Honduras	0	0	7	7
26	British Virgin Islands	0	0	2	2
26	Dominica	0	0	2	2
26	Guadeloupe	0	0	2	2
29	Martinique	0	0	1	1
Totals (29 entries)		444	443	540	1,427

== Marketing ==
Maqui (left) and Volco (right) official mascots of the 2023 Central American and Caribbean Games

=== Emblem ===
The official emblem and motto for the 2023 Central American and Caribbean Games was unveiled on 23 January 2023 at the former Casa Presidencial in San Jacinto, it takes the form of a circle in a colored star pattern. The design was meant to "express the constant movement, evolution and transformation process that El Salvador is experiencing". The stars "represent guided humanity since its origins and have become a symbol that represents harmony, prosperity and glory". The official slogan Es momento de trascender was also unveiled on 23 January 2023. The slogan will be solely used in Spanish.

=== Official song ===
The official song for 2023 Central American and Caribbean Games was released on 8 May 2023, the song is performed by Zaki, Leena Bae, Mayki Graff, and Sebas Barcenas. The song was announced by Yamil Bukele, president of the Organizing Committee of the XXIV Central American and Caribbean Games (COSSAN2023).

=== Corporate sponsorship ===
Sponsors of the 2023 Central American and Caribbean Games
Official Central American and Caribbean Partners
- Banco Cuscatlan
- Bornan Sports Technology
- CEL
- Coca-Cola
- Electrolit
- Lotería
- SISA Suguros
- Surf City El Salvador

=== Mascots ===
The official mascots of the 2023 Central American and Caribbean Games are Maqui and Volco. Maqui a figure inspired by the Maquilíshuat tree and the Games' official emblem. Its fictional characteristics include the ability to run. Volco a figure inspired by the Quezaltepeque Volcano and the Games' official emblem. Its fictional characteristics include the ability of climbing. The official mascots for 2023 Central American and Caribbean Games were released on 23 May 2023.

=== Pictograms ===
On 7 March 2023, the official pictograms were presented of the different disciplines that will be played in the games.

== Broadcasters ==
Territory	Rights holder	Ref
Colombia	Claro Sports	
Costa Rica	Claro Sports	
Dominican Republic	Claro Sports	
El Salvador	Canal 4; Canal 10; Claro Sports; Megavisión; Tigo Sports	
Guatemala	Claro Sports	
Honduras	Claro Sports	
Mexico	Claro Sports; Imagen Televisión; TVC Deportes; TVC Deportes 2	
Nicaragua	Claro Sports	
Panama	Claro Sports	
Venezuela	Claro Sports	

People also followed the Central American and Caribbean Games through the SAN2023 application, which can be downloaded on the Google Play platform for Android devices, and on the App Store for iOS devices.

== See also ==
- Previous Central American and Caribbean Games in El Salvador
  - 1935 Central American and Caribbean Games – San Salvador
  - 2002 Central American and Caribbean Games – San Salvador

Preceded by Barranquilla	Central American and Caribbean Games; San Salvador; XXIV Central American and Caribbean Games (2023)	Succeeded by Santo Domingo
