= Rugby sevens at the 2023 Central American and Caribbean Games =

Athletic competition

- Venue: CODEM and Cuartel San Carlos
- Location: (El Salvador) San Salvador
- Dates: 25–27 June

The rugby sevens competition at the 2023 Central American and Caribbean Games was held from 25 to 27 June at the CODEM and Cuartel San Carlos in San Salvador, El Salvador.

== Medal table ==
* Host nation (El Salvador)

Rank	Nation	Gold	Silver	Bronze	Total
1	Colombia (COL)	2	0	0	2
2	Mexico (MEX)	0	1	1	2
3	Jamaica (JAM)	0	1	0	1
4	Venezuela (VEN)	0	0	1	1
Totals (4 entries)		2	2	2	6

== Medal summary ==
Event	Gold	Silver	Bronze
Men's tournament	Colombia (COL); Jhon Urrutia; Jhojan Ortiz; Juan Agudelo; Diver Ceballos; Neider García; Andrés Álvarez; Luis Giraldo; Jhon Quiñónes; Alain Altahona; Andres Mosquera; Andrés Telléz; Alejandro Guisao	Jamaica (JAM); Rhodri Adamson; Conan Osborne; Jack Rampton; Ronaldeni Fraser; Lloyd Anderson; Nicalus Franklyn; Tyler Bush; Kahill Green; Mikel Facey; Lucas Roy-Smith; Dylan Davis; Chris McIntosh	Mexico (MEX); Christian Henning; Alejandro Revilla; Enrique Carmona; Alejandro Chávez; Alberto Rodríguez; Jose de la Torre; Franco Guerrero; Ricardo Ancira; Diego Espejel; Andres Rodríguez; Nicolas Falcon; Luc Martín
Women's tournament	Colombia (COL); María Arzuaga; Valentina Tapias; Daniela Alzate; Madi Cordoba; Valeria Muñoz; Laura Álvarez; Maribel Mestra; Sofía Granados; Laura Mejía; Leidy Soto; Zuleyma Orobio; Juliana Soto	Mexico (MEX); Andrea Espinosa; Vanessa Rodríguez; Jennifer Salomon; Alessandra Bender; Laura Rodríguez; Cecilia Ramírez; Zoe Tuyu; Daniela Alvarado; Bertha Landeros; Isabela González; Irayda Macedo; María Tovar	Venezuela (VEN); Keyzhi Rojas; Gabriela Navarro; Teresa Le Maitre; Rosngela Aguilar; Greisy Ramírez; Estefania Salami; Jose Díaz; María Díaz; María Gabriela Vera; Yolanda Pérez; Yulianny Camacho; Moureen Baloa
