= Surfing at the 2023 Central American and Caribbean Games =

- Venue: Surf City; La Libertad
- Location: (El Salvador) San Salvador
- Dates: 24–29 June

The surf competition at the 2023 Central American and Caribbean Games will be held at Surf City and La Libertad in La Libertad, El Salvador from 24 to 28 June.

== Medal table ==
* Host nation (El Salvador)

Rank	Nation	Gold	Silver	Bronze	Total
1	El Salvador (ESA)*	2	0	1	3
2	Panama (PAN)	2	0	0	2
3	Mexico (MEX)	1	1	3	5
4	Barbados (BAR)	1	0	0	1
5	Venezuela (VEN)	0	2	1	3
6	Puerto Rico (PUR)	0	2	0	2
7	Costa Rica (CRC)	0	1	1	2
Totals (7 entries)		6	6	6	18

== Medal summary ==
=== Men's events ===
Event	Gold	Silver	Bronze
Shortboard	Sebastian Williams (MEX)	Francisco Bellorin (VEN)	Brayan Alas (ESA)
Bodyboard Prone	Edwin Núñez (PAN)	Jesus Arocha (VEN)	Alfonso Aguilar (MEX)
Longboard	Amado Alvarado (ESA)	Roberto Poo (MEX)	Anthonny Mesen (CRC)

=== Women's events ===
Event	Gold	Silver	Bronze
Shortboard	Chelsea Tuach (BAR)	Havanna Cabrero (PUR)	Shelby Detmers (MEX)
Bodyboard Prone	Veronica Correa (PAN)	Anais Mendoza (PUR)	Rosmarky Álvarez (VEN)
Longboard	Sindy Portillo (ESA)	Roan Reyes (CRC)	Coral Bonilla (MEX)
