= Table tennis at the 2023 Central American and Caribbean Games =

- Venue: Palacio de los Deportes Carlos "El Famoso" Hernández
- Location: (El Salvador) San Salvador
- Dates: 21–27 June

The table tennis competition at the 2023 Central American and Caribbean Games will be held in San Salvador, El Salvador from 24 to 29 June at the Palacio de los Deportes Carlos "El Famoso" Hernández.

== Medal table ==
* Host nation (El Salvador)

Rank	Nation	Gold	Silver	Bronze	Total
1	Cuba (CUB)	3	2	2	7
2	Puerto Rico (PUR)	2	3	3	8
3	Mexico (MEX)	1	1	4	6
4	Centro Caribe Sports (CCS)	1	0	1	2
5	Venezuela (VEN)	0	1	1	2
6	Dominican Republic (DOM)	0	0	2	2
7	Costa Rica (CRC)	0	0	1	1
Totals (7 entries)		7	7	14	28

== Medal summary ==
Event	Gold	Silver	Bronze
Men's singles	Andy Pereira; Cuba	Brian Afanador; Puerto Rico	Jiaji Wu; Dominican Republic
Men's singles	Andy Pereira; Cuba	Brian Afanador; Puerto Rico	Livan Martinez; Cuba
Women's singles	Adriana Díaz; Puerto Rico	Yadira Silva; Mexico	Clio Barcenas; Mexico
Women's singles	Adriana Díaz; Puerto Rico	Yadira Silva; Mexico	Brianna Burgos; Puerto Rico
Men's doubles	Cuba; Andy Pereira; Jorge Campos	Puerto Rico; Brian Afanador; Daniel González	Mexico; Marcos Madrid; Juan Gómez
Men's doubles	Cuba; Andy Pereira; Jorge Campos	Puerto Rico; Brian Afanador; Daniel González	Costa Rica; Daniel Araya; Alejandro Montoya
Women's doubles	Centro Caribe Sports; Lucia Cordero; Mabelyn Enriquez	Venezuela; Camila Obando; Roxi Gonzalez	Cuba; Idalys Lovet; Daniela Fonseca
Women's doubles	Centro Caribe Sports; Lucia Cordero; Mabelyn Enriquez	Venezuela; Camila Obando; Roxi Gonzalez	Puerto Rico; Adriana Díaz; Melanie Díaz
Mixed doubles	Mexico; Marcos Madrid; Yadira Silva	Cuba; Jorge Campos; Daniela Fonseca	Mexico; Juan Gomez; Arantxa Cossio
Mixed doubles	Mexico; Marcos Madrid; Yadira Silva	Cuba; Jorge Campos; Daniela Fonseca	Puerto Rico; Brian Afanador; Adriana Díaz
Men's team	Puerto Rico; Daniel González; Oscar Birriel; Brian Afanador; Ángel Naranjo	Cuba; Jorge Campos; Andy Pereira; Adrian Pérez; Livan Martínez	Centro Caribe Sports; Diego de la Cruz; Heber Moscoso; Héctor Gatica; Sergio Carrillo
Men's team	Puerto Rico; Daniel González; Oscar Birriel; Brian Afanador; Ángel Naranjo	Cuba; Jorge Campos; Andy Pereira; Adrian Pérez; Livan Martínez	Venezuela; Luis Vanegas; Carlos Ríos; Raymundo Medina; César Castillo
Women's team	Cuba; Daniela Fonseca; Estela Crespo; Idalys Lovet; Lizdainet Rodríguez	Puerto Rico; Melanie Díaz; Adriana Díaz; Brianna Burgos; Alondra Rodríguez	Dominican Republic; Yasiris Ortíz; Esmerlyn Castro; Shary Muñoz; Eva Brito
Women's team	Cuba; Daniela Fonseca; Estela Crespo; Idalys Lovet; Lizdainet Rodríguez	Puerto Rico; Melanie Díaz; Adriana Díaz; Brianna Burgos; Alondra Rodríguez	Mexico; Clio Bárcenas; Arantxa Cossio; Yadira Silva; Mónica Serrano
