= Beach soccer at the 2023 Central American and Caribbean Games =

- Venue: Complejo Deportivo Flor Blanca
- Location: (El Salvador) San Salvador
- Dates: 2–6 July

The beach soccer competition at the 2023 Central American and Caribbean Games will be held in San Salvador, El Salvador from 2 July to 6 July at the Complejo Deportivo Flor Blanca.

== Medal summary ==
=== Medal table ===
* Host nation (El Salvador)

Rank	Nation	Gold	Silver	Bronze	Total
1	Colombia (COL)	1	0	0	1
2	El Salvador (ESA)*	0	1	0	1
3	Venezuela (VEN)	0	0	1	1
Totals (3 entries)		1	1	1	3

=== Medalists ===
Event	Gold	Silver	Bronze
Men's tournament	Colombia (COL); Alejandro Quintero; Eduardo Lopez; Esleider Avila; Kevin Clavijo; Wilmar Donado; Juan Ossa; Sebastian Hernandez; Julio Pantoja; Andres Rivera; Rafael Acosta; Victor Morales; Edward Bonilla	El Salvador (ESA); Jose Portillo; Elmer Robles; Melvin Gonzalez; Jason Urbina; Oscar Cruz; Andres Osorio; Heber Ramos; Emerson Cerna; Rafael Rizo; Erick Najera; Rogelio Rauda; Francisco Velasquez	Venezuela (VEN); Fausto Escobar; Randy Rivas; Diego Palencia; Luis Carrero; Edgar Castellanos; Rosdel Ramos; Robert Perez; Enderson Ramos; Jeyker Rivero; Cristofer Noguera; Carlos Perez; Vicente Duque; Jose Betancourt
