= Claro Sports =

Mexican pay television channel

- Country: Mexico
- Broadcast area: Americas (principally Spanish-speaking countries)
- Headquarters: Mexico City, Mexico

Ownership
- Owner: América Móvil

History
- Launched: December 16, 2013; 12 years ago

Links
- Website: www.clarosports.com

Availability

Streaming media
- YouTube: Official Channel (Live stream simulcasts available in Latin America only)

Claro Sports is a Hispanic American television channel of Mexican origin and is owned by América Móvil. Its programming is focused on sports. It is distributed exclusively by the television provider Claro TV, except in Mexico, where it is available through operators such as Star TV, Dish, Megacable, and Totalplay. The channel acquired the broadcasting rights for Hispanic America for the 2020 Summer Olympics and Paralympic Games, as well as the 2024 Summer Olympics and Paralympic Games. This channel replaced other networks in three countries: in Colombia, it replaced Claro TV's Canal Versus; in Mexico, it replaced the Viva Sports channel operated by MVS Comunicaciones; and in Venezuela, it replaced the Sport Plus channel, also known as Canal Plus, on some cable operators.

== History ==
Before Claro Sports was launched on the air, the channel was known as Viva Sports, which was not widely distributed among cable operators and lacked a diverse programming lineup that could secure a stable audience. The channel was officially launched on December 16, 2013, backed by América Móvil and its director, Arturo Elías Ayub. The signal is available throughout Hispanic America, where América Móvil operates pay television systems.

The first program was created based on an idea by producer Pepe Quirarte, and it was a news show hosted by Gabriela Cobo and Rodrigo Méndez. Shortly afterward, hourly news capsules titled "Tiempo Fuera" ("Time Out") were introduced. The channel also formed a partnership in Mexico with the Spanish newspaper Marca, with which it merged content and coverage. In this way, the team grew, and the content expanded, eventually becoming the established channel it is today. On July 28, 2019, Claro Sports began operations in Guatemala to offer local content for Central America and the Dominican Republic. In Guatemala, it holds the broadcasting rights for three teams in the National Football League and 11 clubs in the First Division League.

== Dispute with Fox Sports (2022) ==
On July 31, 2022, during the broadcast of the León vs. América match from the 2022 Apertura Tournament on Claro Sports through its YouTube channel "Marca Claro," the television network Fox Sports took down the stream from that website, alleging copyright infringement. In response, Claro Sports restored the broadcast, only for it to be taken down again minutes later by Fox Sports. In an official statement, América Móvil, Claro Sports, and Marca Claro—through their content director Arturo Elías Ayub (who tweeted: “When you have a bad and expensive product like Fox Sports competing with a much better one like @MarcaClaro and @ClaroSports, you have to resort to dirty tricks like the one yesterday during the #León vs. #América match, even if it harms millions of fans”)—explained that they also held the rights to broadcast Club León’s home matches, and would be taking legal action against Fox Sports and its parent company, Grupo Multimedia Lauman, for damages. Fox Sports also released a statement accepting full responsibility for the incident but emphasized that they would not allow matches—whose rights are shared with other networks—to be broadcast for free, especially when some of them are aired on their Premium channel, which requires a paid subscription. Shortly afterward, both networks began negotiations to avoid further conflicts.

== Sports coverage ==
=== Multisport Events ===
- Summer Olympic Games
- Winter Olympic Games
- Youth Olympic Games
- Winter Youth Olympic Games
- Pan American Games
- European Games
- Central American and Caribbean Games
- World Police and Fire Games

=== Athletics ===
- Mexico City Marathon

=== Motorsports ===
- Formula E
- Super Formula Championship
- Championship Auto Racing Teams

=== Mixed martial arts ===
- Hard Knocks Fighting
- M-1 Global
- ONE Championship

=== Badminton ===
- Thomas Cup
- Uber Cup
- Sudirman Cup

=== Basketball ===
- NCAA Division I Men's Basketball Tournament

=== Baseball ===
- Mexican Baseball League
- Colombian Professional Baseball League

=== Boxing ===
- World Boxing Council
- World Boxing Championships
- IBA Women's World Boxing Championships

=== Cycling ===
- Clásico RCN
- Tour of Oman
- CRO Race
- Vuelta a Guatemala
- UCI Mountain Bike World Cup
- Tour of the Basque Country

=== Fencing ===
- World Fencing Championships

=== Football ===
- Liga MX
- UEFA Europa League
- UEFA Conference League
- Primeira Liga
- Super League Greece
- Liga Guate
- Primera División de Ascenso

=== American football ===
- National Collegiate Athletic Association
- ONEFA

=== Futsal ===
- Liga Nacional de Fútbol de Salón
- Liga Nacional de Fútbol de Salón Femenina
- Campeonato Sudamericano de Clubes de Futsal

=== Gymnastics ===
- European Artistic Gymnastics Championships
- Rhythmic Gymnastics European Championships

=== Golf ===
- LIV Golf
- Colombia Championship

=== Judo ===
- World Judo Championships

=== Wrestling ===
- Total Nonstop Action Wrestling

=== Motorcycling ===
- Isle of Man TT
- GP Colombia Cassarella Motorcycle Championship
- UCI BMX Racing World Cup
- Asia Road Racing Championship

=== Swimming ===
- European Short Course Swimming Championships
- FINA Diving World Series
- LEN European Aquatics Championships
- World Para Swimming Championships

=== Show jumping ===
- Global Champions Tour

=== Softball ===
- Mexican Softball League

=== Taekwondo ===
- World Taekwondo Grand Prix

=== Archery ===
- World Archery Championships

=== Sailing ===
- Sailing World Championships

=== Volleyball ===
- NCAA Beach Volleyball Championship
- CEV Champions League
- CEV Women's Champions League

== Programs ==
- Marca Claro MVS Radio
- Jugando Claro
- Deportes en Claro
- Adrenalina
- Absolute X
- Ultimate Rush
- El corazón de la fiera
- Auto y pista
- Vidas extraordinarias
- Tread BMX
- Biatlón
- Enciclopedia del deporte
- Compacto León
- Claro soy Tuzo
- Fútbol y Tacón
- Sport Confidential
- La casa de los leones
- Road To Río
- Quisiera ser
- En el Diamante
- Football Stars
- Olympia
- Historia Olímpica
- Guide to the Games
- Noticias Claro Sports Colombia

== Notable members ==
- (Brazil) (Mexico) Ailton Da Silva
- (Colombia) (France) Ana María Ospina
- (Colombia) Angélica Camacho
- (Colombia) Antonio Casale
- (Colombia) Benjamín Cuello
- (Colombia) Camilo Porras
- (Colombia) Christian Mejía
- (Colombia) Guillermo Arango
- (Colombia) Humberto Luis
- (Colombia) Jhon Rubio
- (Colombia) Joaquim Brasil
- (Colombia) José Andrés Páez
- (Colombia) José Luis Barraza
- (Colombia) Mario César Otálvaro
- (Colombia) Martín de Francisco
- (Colombia) Mauricio Posada
- (Colombia) Natalia Sabina
- (Colombia) Octavio Mora
- (Colombia) Rafael Cifuentes
- (Colombia) Sebastián Heredia
- (Colombia) Vanessa Palacio
- (Mexico) Aarón Soriano
- (Mexico) Adolfo Ríos
- (Mexico) Alberto Lati
- (Mexico) Alberto Sierra
- (Mexico) Aldo Lara
- (Mexico) Álex Orvañanos
- (Mexico) Alfonso Lanzagorta
- (Mexico) Alfonso Victoria
- (Mexico) Alfredo "El Doc" Bustamante
- (Mexico) Alfredo Bush
- (Mexico) Alfredo Rivas
- (Mexico) Ángela Vignau
- (Mexico) Adriana Maldonado
- (Mexico) Antonio Moreno
- (Mexico) Armando López
- (Mexico) Arturo Cota
- (Mexico) Carlos Legaspi
- (Mexico) Carlos Moreno
- (Mexico) Cindy Lira
- (Mexico) Daniel Ancheyta
- (Mexico) Daniela Cohen
- (Mexico) Diego Pérez
- (Mexico) Edgar Jiménez
- (Mexico) Félix Fernández
- (Mexico) (Argentina) Gabriel Gerberoff
- (Mexico) Gabriela Cobo
- (Mexico) Guillermo García "Memo"
- (Mexico) Ismael Azuara
- (Mexico) Javier Cardoso Núñez
- (Mexico) Javier Salinas
- (Mexico) Joaquín Beltrán
- (Mexico) Joel Morales
- (Mexico) Jorge Cocoa Álvarez
- (Mexico) Juan Carlos Castellanos
- (Mexico) Luis Villicaña
- (Mexico) Marco Tolama
- (Mexico) (Peru) María José Rojas
- (Mexico) Mariana Zacarías
- (Mexico) Mario Antuña
- (Mexico) Martha Guerra
- (Mexico) Miguel Gurwitz
- (Mexico) Nicolás Romay Pinal
- (Mexico) Paco Barón Torres
- (Mexico) Paulina García Robles
- (Mexico) Pía Ramos
- (Mexico) Ramón Barrenechea
- (Mexico) Renato Flores Cartás
- (Mexico) Ricardo "Tirus" Bravo
- (Mexico) Robert Peláez
- (Mexico) Roberta Rodríguez
- (Mexico) Rodolfo Villicaña
- (Mexico) Rodrigo del Campo
- (Mexico) Rodrigo Méndez
- (Mexico) Ulises Hervert
- (Mexico) Xavi Sol
- (Dominican Republic) Duaner Sánchez
- (Guatemala) Marisol Padilla
- (Guatemala) Dwight Pezzarossi
- (Guatemala) Luis Rolando Solares
- (Guatemala) Mynor Barrios
- (Guatemala) Robinson Ortiz
- (Guatemala) Kevin Itzep
- (Guatemala) Jenner Barrios
- (Guatemala) Marvin Salazar
- (Guatemala) Michelle Rossell
- (Guatemala) Marco Rodas

== See also ==
- Television in Mexico
