= Jorge Barraza =

Argentine journalist (born 1955)

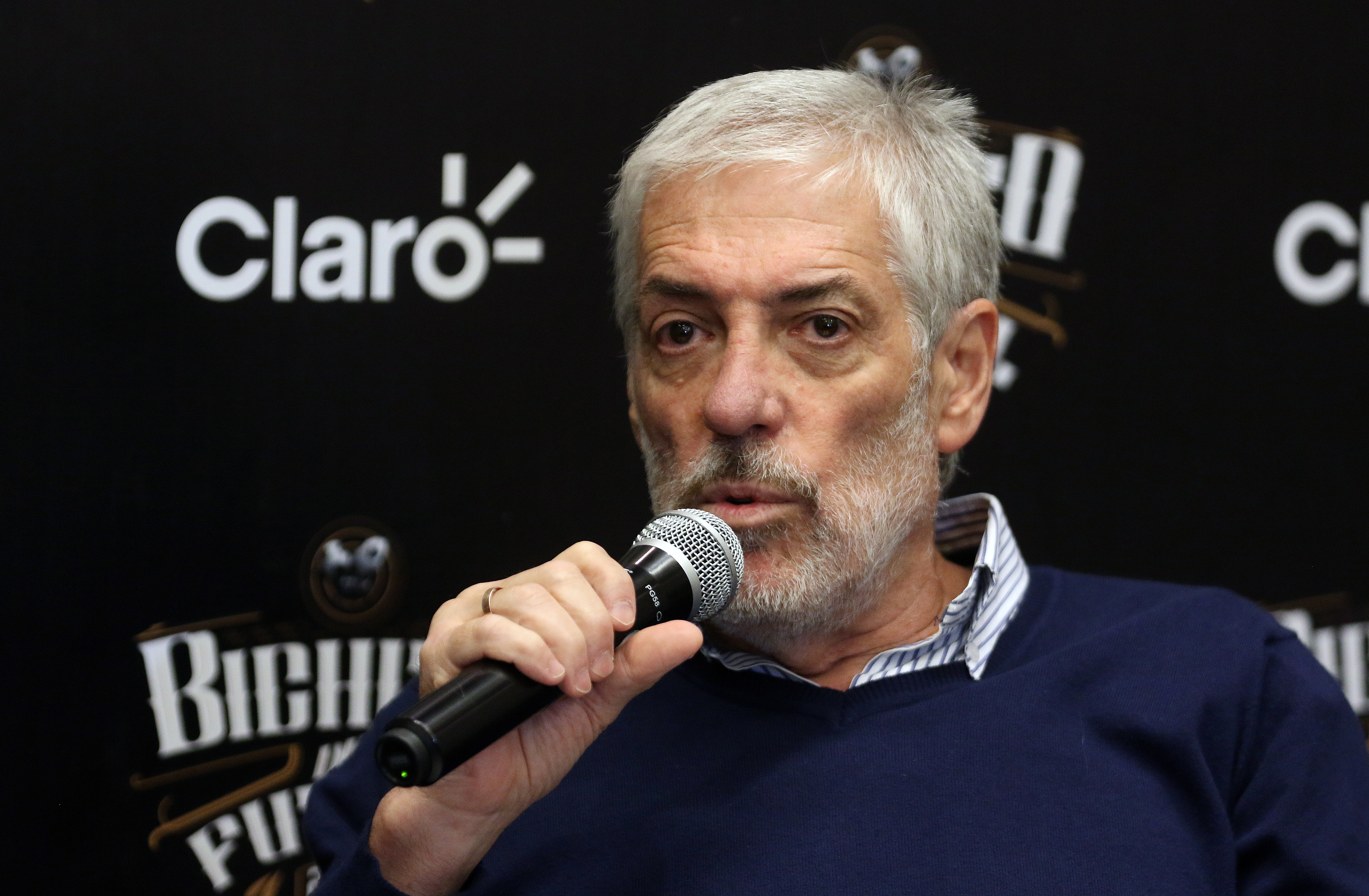
Jorge Barraza in Quito, Ecuador on 2018.

Jorge Barraza (born 4 April 1955) is an Argentine journalist, book author, and former chief editor of Magazine Conmebol, the official publication of the South American Football Confederation (CONMEBOL). He is a columnist and reporter for several leading Latin American newspapers—including Peru's El Comercio, Ecuador's El Universo, Colombia's El Tiempo—and newspapers of less circulation—including Costa Rica's La Nación and Bolivia's La Razón. Barraza also used to serve as a journalist for Argentine newspaper Crónica and the sports journal El Gráfico, which is considered one of Latin America's most prestigious sports publications.

About his work as a journalist, Barraza comments: "My motto is truth and ethics above everything. Later, well, a series of condiments, thinking about the people, about my convictions, my love for this beautiful profession. And the desire to learn a little more each day to enrich myself" (in Spanish: "Mi lema es la verdad y la ética por delante de todo. Y luego, bueno, una serie de condimentos, pensar en la gente, en mis convicciones, el amor por esta profesión tan hermosa. Y querer aprender un poquito más cada día para enriquecerme.").

== Career ==
=== Magazine Conmebol ===
During his employment with Magazine Conmebol, Barraza edited several publications for CONMEBOL, including the complete histories of Copa Libertadores and the Copa América.

Barraza served as chief editor of Magazine Conmebol until 2015, when CONMEBOL president Eugenio Figueredo decided to shut down the publication to reduce expense for the organization. According to Ecuadorian newspaper El Universo, Magazine CONMEBOL was "considered a tradition of South American football" due to its 24-year history, publication in three languages (Spanish, English, and Portuguese), and the recognition it received from the specialized world football news reporting media. During the upheaval caused by the 2015 FIFA corruption case, Barraza and other former workers of Magazine Conmebol denounced CONMEBOL due to its discriminatory and abusive treatment.

Reporting for Colombia's El Tiempo about another corrupt practice in FIFA, Barraza wrote about his time as a member of these international sports bodies, declaring that "At one point we felt pride to be a part of this universal organization, [but] today we are happy to not be there. The same as in CONMEBOL" (In Spanish: "En algún momento sentimos orgullo de pertenecer a esa universal organización, hoy somos felices de no estar. Lo mismo que en Conmebol").

=== Other work ===
Aside from his contributions in Spanish sports media, Barraza has also served as a journalist for Japanese sports publications World Soccer Magazine and Internacional Press.

In 2015, Barraza was invited to participate in the First International Congress of Sport, to be held in Lima, also known as Peru Sports Summit 2015.

== Publications ==
In 2014, Barraza wrote the book Fútbol De Ayer Y De Hoy, published by Ediciones B (a publishing company from Spain), which argues that modern football is better than that of the past. His argument is based on the improved physical qualities of modern players and the development of the sport in various parts of the world.

Also in 2014, Ediciones B published Barraza's book James: En La Cima Del Mundo, a biography of Colombian midfielder James Rodríguez from his early years as a child athlete to his rise as a player in modern football.

== Honors ==
On 22 September 2015, Jorge Barraza was awarded a series of honors thanks to his work in the Ecuadorian newspaper El Universo. Among these were plaques of honor by the Ecuadorian universities Casa Grande and Universidad Laica Vicente Rocafuerte, the key to the city of Samborondón by the city's mayor Jorge Yúnez, as well as a recognition from the municipality of Guayaquil.
