= Alberto Lati =

Mexican journalist and writer (born 1978)

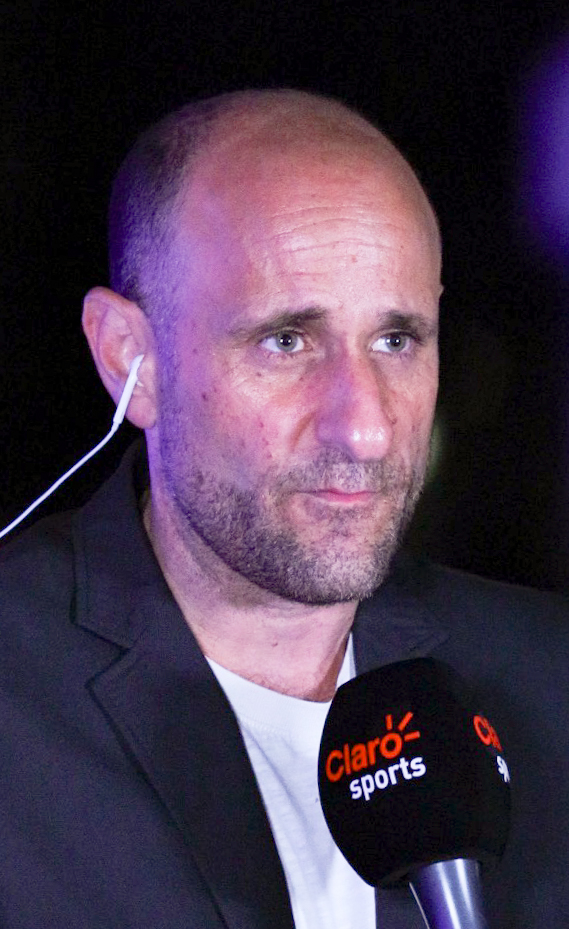
- Lati in 2026
- Born: 20 June 1978 (age 48); Mexico City, Mexico
- Occupation: Journalist

Alberto Lati Mercado (born 20 June 1978) is a Mexican sports broadcaster with Claro Sports. Lati has presented important events including FIFA World Cups, Super Bowl, and Winter and Summer Olympic Games. He is also an invited panelist at Tercer Grado Deportivo a Televisa’s production and hosted by Denise Maerker. In addition, he hosts El Podcast de Alberto Lati, a production from futvox where he talks about sports and global history.

== Career ==
Since 2016 to date, he collaborates with Claro Sports, where he is part of the panel on the show La Delantera, in addition to having presented the opening ceremony of the Olympic Games. Since 2023, he has continued his role as a guest panelist on the show Tercer Grado Deportivo, hosted by Denise Maerker and produced by Televisa.

The journalist made his voice acting debut in 2026 in the movie Minions & Monsters, providing the voice for the character Elwood.

He also has worked at Fox Sports and hosted both, Agenda Fox Sports and Latitude Fox. During the 2018 FIFA World Cup, he hosted Russia Latitude for National Geographic. The program documented the most important historical places in Russia weaving history, politic, culture, and soccer. The sportscaster worked for Televisa, the biggest multimedia mass media company in Mexico, from 1995 to 2016. His first book "Latitudes: Crónica, viaje y balón", was first published in 2013 and reissued to became a bestseller in 2016.

Lati also maintains a regular presence in print and digital media. From 2016 - 2022, he wrote his bi-weekly column, Latitudes, for the national newspaper Diario 24 Horas, where he examines topics ranging from institutional policies of the International Olympic Committee to major developments within Liga MX.

As a reporter, Lati has visited almost 100 countries and lived in Tokyo, Madrid, Athens, Munich, Beijing, Johannesburg, and London. The journalist carried the torch of the London Olympics on July 6, 2012. It must be emphasized his active participation with ACNUR campaigns on refugees dilemmas. In July 2021 Lati was announced as an UNHCR Goodwill Ambassador for Mexico.

In 2021 he became a fellow member of HYPIA, The International Association of Hyperpolyglots. Moreover, Lati was awarded as outstanding journalist at the World Knowledge Summit 2021 with an honorary doctorate. Due to his interest in studying multiple languages he speaks Spanish, Hebrew, English, French, Italian, Greek, German, Mandarin Chinese, isiZulu, Portuguese, Russian, and Japanese. His noteworthy interviews include Nobel Prize laureates: Malala Yousafza, Dalai Lama, Rigoberta Menchú and Óscar Arias, Olympic swimmer Michael Phelps, tennis champ Roger Federer, football stars: Diego Armando Maradona, Pelé and Cristiano Ronaldo, and "the fastest man alive" Usain Bolt.

== Early life ==
Lati pursued his undergraduate studies at the Universidad Iberoamericana, graduating with a Bachelor's Degree in Communication Sciences.

== Writer ==
Lati narrates his experiences around the world in "Latitudes: Crónica, viaje y balón", his first published book and bestseller in 2016. In 2018 he published his first novel "Aquí, Borya". In May 2020 he published "100 Dioses del Olimpo: De niños a Superhéroes" and "20 pelotazos de esperanza en tiempos de crisis".

=== Publications ===
1. "Latitudes: Crónica, viaje y balón" - 2013 ISBN 978-607-7638-95-7
2. "Aquí, Borya" - 2018 ISBN 978-607-31-7315-5
3. "100 genios del balón" - 2019 ISBN 978-607-31-7388-9
4. "100 Dioses del Olimpo: De niños a Superhéroes " - 2020 ISBN 978-607-31-8836-4
5. "20 pelotazos de esperanza en tiempos de crisis" - 2020 ISBN 978-607-31-9550-8
6. "Genios de Qatar. De niños a cracks Pasta blanda"- 2022 ISBN 978-607-38-1631-1
7. "100 glorias de México: De niños a campeones" - ISBN 978-607-38-4514-4
8. "La apasionante historia de los mundiales" - 2026 ISBN 978-607-38-6202-8
9. "Genios del mundial 2026" - ISBN 978-607-38-7047-4
