= Triathlon at the 2023 Central American and Caribbean Games =

- Venue: Playa Costa Del Sol
- Location: (El Salvador) Playa Costa Del Sol
- Dates: 5–7 July

The triathlon competition at the 2023 Central American and Caribbean Games will be held in San Salvador, El Salvador from 5 to 7 July at the Costa Del Sol.

== Medal table ==
* Host nation (El Salvador)

Rank	Nation	Gold	Silver	Bronze	Total
1	Mexico (MEX)	4	2	1	7
2	Colombia (COL)	1	2	0	3
3	Venezuela (VEN)	0	1	0	1
4	Cuba (CUB)	0	0	3	3
5	Barbados (BAR)	0	0	1	1
Totals (5 entries)		5	5	5	15

== Medal summary ==
=== Men's events ===
Event	Gold	Silver	Bronze
Individual	Aram Penaflor (MEX)	Crisanto Grajales (MEX)	Matthew Wright (BAR)
Team	Mexico (MEX); Rodrigo Gonzalez; Aram Penaflor; Crisanto Grajales	Venezuela (VEN); Yohusman Perdomo; Luis Velasquez; Samuel Pina	Cuba (CUB); Jorge Alemanez; Alejandro Rodriguez; Kevin Milian

=== Women's events ===
Event	Gold	Silver	Bronze
Individual	Carolina Velásquez (COL)	Rosa Tapia (MEX)	Cecilia Perez (MEX)
Team	Mexico (MEX); Cecilia Ramirez; Rosa Tapia; Cecilia Perez	Colombia (COL); Valentina Álvarez; Diana Castillo; Carolina Velásquez	Cuba (CUB); Isabel Rodriguez; Niuska Figueredo; Leslie Amat

=== Mixed events ===
Event	Gold	Silver	Bronze
Team Relay	Mexico (MEX); Aram Penaflor; Rosa Tapia; Crisanto Grajales; Cecilia Perez	Colombia (COL); Hugo Ruiz; Diana Castillo; Brian Moya; Carolina Velásquez	Cuba (CUB); Alejandro Rodriguez; Leslie Amat; Kevin Milian; Niuska Figueredo
