= Megavisión El Salvador =

Salvadoran broadcasting company

Group Megavisión is a Salvadoran broadcasting company that operates three television channels and more than twenty national radio stations. It was founded by Óscar Antonio Safie.

It began with the creation of the news service, Channel 21, in 1994. Later Channel 19 targeted a female audience. In 2001, Group Megavisión created its third channel, Channel 15, named ESTV, "Salvadoran Television". In 2007, Channel 15 was shuttered after struggling to build an audience. In 2012, Channel 15 returned to the air and is now under the name of Movie World TV.

== Collaboration ==
- In 1998, Group Megavisión partnered with Nickelodeon to carry the network's animated and youth-focused content.
- In 2006, Group Megavisión partnered with MTV Networks and VH1.
- In 2009, Group Megavisión partnered with six additional television stations in El Salvador.

== National Production ==
=== Canal 21 (Channel 21) ===
Channel 21 features a variety of programming suitable for all ages, including:

- Get Up My People
- Telenoticias Megavisión
- Fanatical+
- The Basement
- My Country TV
- Dialogue with Ernesto López
- 7 Days (News of the Week)
- EXIT
- Code 21
- 21 a la Carte
- Thinking out Loud
- Extreme culture

=== Canal (Channel) 19 ===
The original content of Canal 19 featured the programming of Nickelodeon. In May 2012, Channel 19 was restructured and began broadcasting Channel 21 programs.

==== MegaNoticias Canal 19 (MegaNews Channel 19) ====
In August 2012, Group Megavisión launched "El nuevo Canal 19" which featured political, economic, business and international news, sports and opinion programs.

Today Channel 19 is a thematic channel. Previously it was a news channel and a children's channel.

=== Awapa Sports TV (Canal 15) ===
Megavisión launched Movie World on Channel 15 in 2012, broadcasting films in the genres of horror, drama, comedy, romance and action. In August 2023, the channel changed to Awapa Sports TV. However, the channel currently has no signal.

== Group Megavisión Radio Stations ==
- Radio Corazón 97.3 FM VHF
- Radio Fuego 107.7 FM VHF
- Sonso Mix 92.5 FM VHF (Sonsonate)
- Radio La Libertad 98.1 FM VHF (La Libertad)
- Radio Megahits 92.5 FM VHF (Ahuachapán)
- Mi Radio 98.1 FM VHF (San Vicente)
- Radio Jiboa 90.5 FM VHF (San Vicente)
