= Karate at the 2018 Summer Youth Olympics – Girls' +59 kg =

Karate competition

Girls' Kumite +59 kg at the III Summer Youth Olympic Games
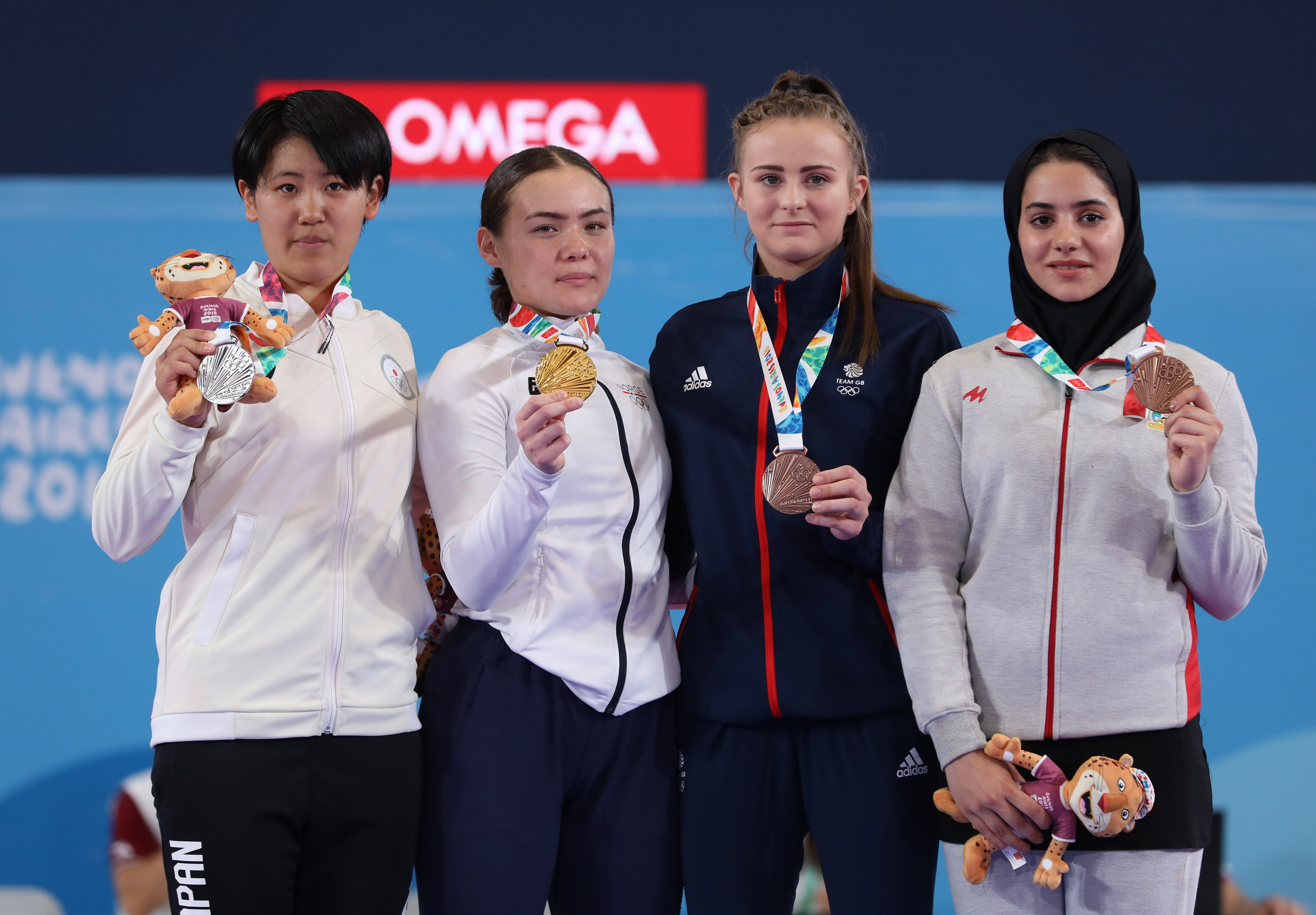
- Venue: Europa Pavilion
- Date: 18 October
- Competitors: 8 from 8 nations

Medalists
1st place, gold medalist(s)		Annika Sælid	Norway
2nd place, silver medalist(s)		Sakura Sawashima	Japan
3rd place, bronze medalist(s)		Lauren Salisbury	Great Britain
3rd place, bronze medalist(s)		Negin Altooni	Iran

The girls' kumite +59 kg competition at the 2018 Summer Youth Olympics was held on 18 October at the Europa Pavilion in Buenos Aires, Argentina.

== Schedule ==
All times are in local time (UTC-3).

Date	Time	Round
Thursday, 18 October	10:05	Elimination round
Thursday, 18 October	14:15	Semifinals
Thursday, 18 October	14:49	Final

== Results ==
=== Elimination round ===
==== Pool A ====
Rank	Athlete	B	W	D	L	Pts	Score
1	Sakura Sawashima (JPN)	3	2	0	1	4	6–5
2	Negin Altooni (IRI)	3	1	1	1	3	5–2
3	Janessa Fonseca (PUR)	3	1	1	1	3	2–3
4	Laura Lyck (DEN)	3	1	0	2	2	1–4

	Score	
Laura Lyck (DEN)	0–2	Sakura Sawashima (JPN)
Negin Altooni (IRI)	0–0	Janessa Fonseca (PUR)
Negin Altooni (IRI)	5–1	Sakura Sawashima (JPN)
Laura Lyck (DEN)	0–2	Janessa Fonseca (PUR)
Janessa Fonseca (PUR)	0–3	Sakura Sawashima (JPN)
Laura Lyck (DEN)	1–0	Negin Altooni (IRI)

==== Pool B ====
Rank	Athlete	B	W	D	L	Pts	Score
1	Annika Sælid (NOR)	3	3	0	0	6	4–0
2	Lauren Salisbury (GBR)	3	1	0	2	2	7–6
3	Sarah Al-Ameri (UAE)	3	1	0	2	2	4–6
4	Keli Kydonaki (GRE)	3	1	0	2	2	4–7

	Score	
Keli Kydonaki (GRE)	4–2	Lauren Salisbury (GBR)
Sarah Al-Ameri (UAE)	0–1	Annika Sælid (NOR)
Sarah Al-Ameri (UAE)	0–5	Lauren Salisbury (GBR)
Keli Kydonaki (GRE)	0–1	Annika Sælid (NOR)
Annika Sælid (NOR)	2–0	Lauren Salisbury (GBR)
Keli Kydonaki (GRE)	0–4	Sarah Al-Ameri (UAE)

=== Semifinals ===
	Score	
Sakura Sawashima (JPN)	9–1	Lauren Salisbury (GBR)
Annika Sælid (NOR)	4–0	Negin Altooni (IRI)

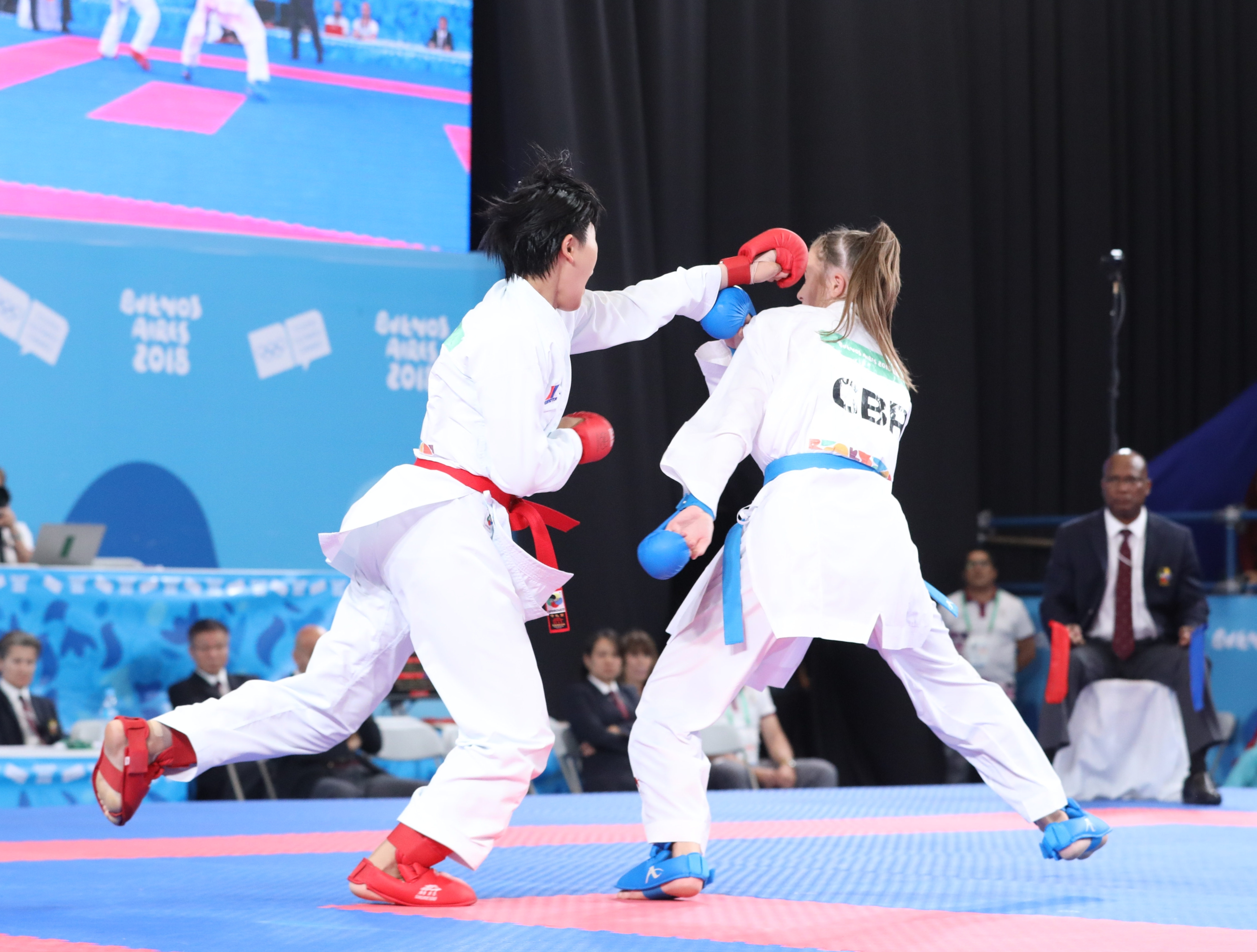
Sakura Sawashima versus Lauren Salisbury

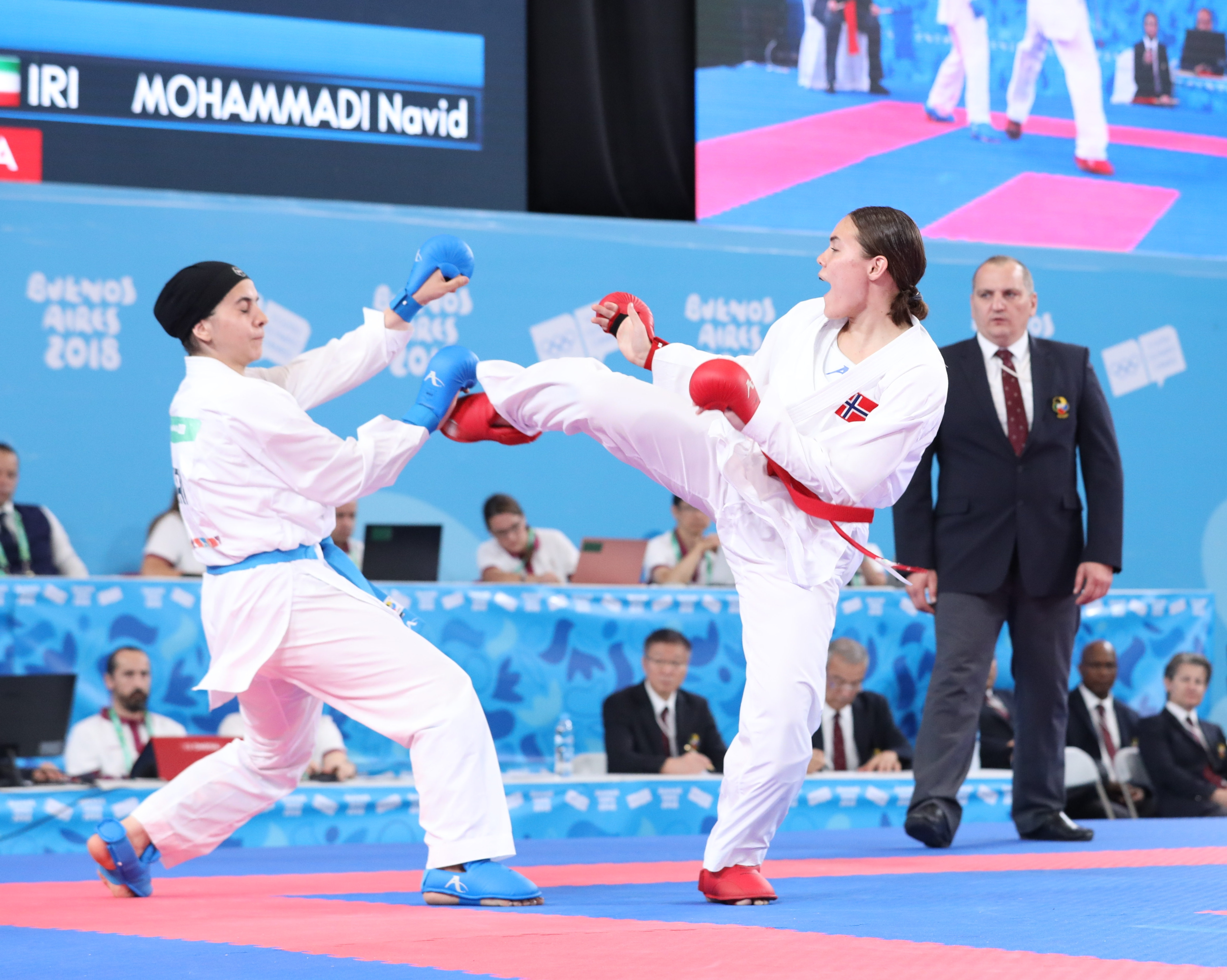
Annika Sælid versus Negin Altooni

=== Final ===
	Score	
Sakura Sawashima (JPN)	0–3	Annika Sælid (NOR)

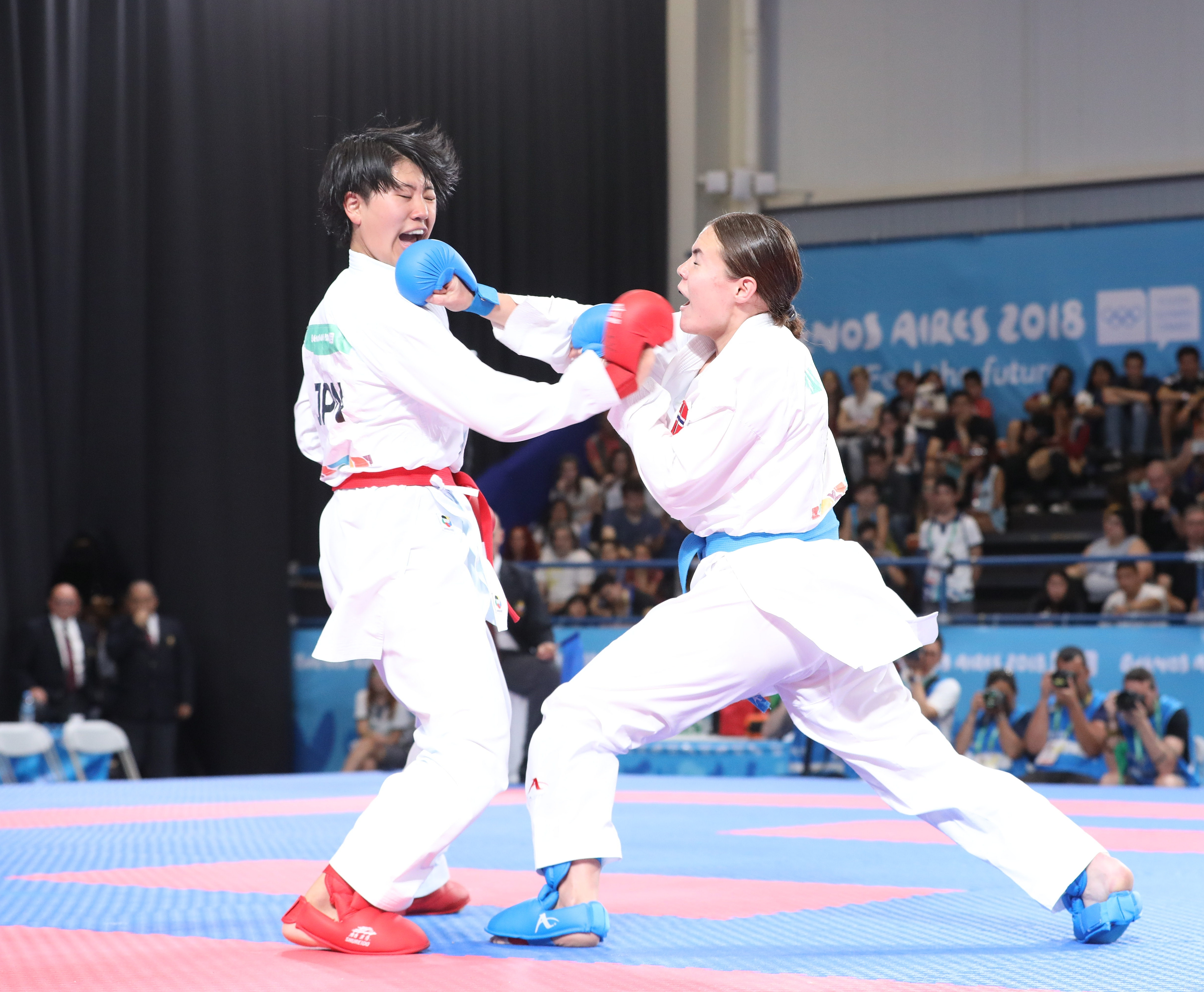
Sakura Sawashima versus Annika Sælid

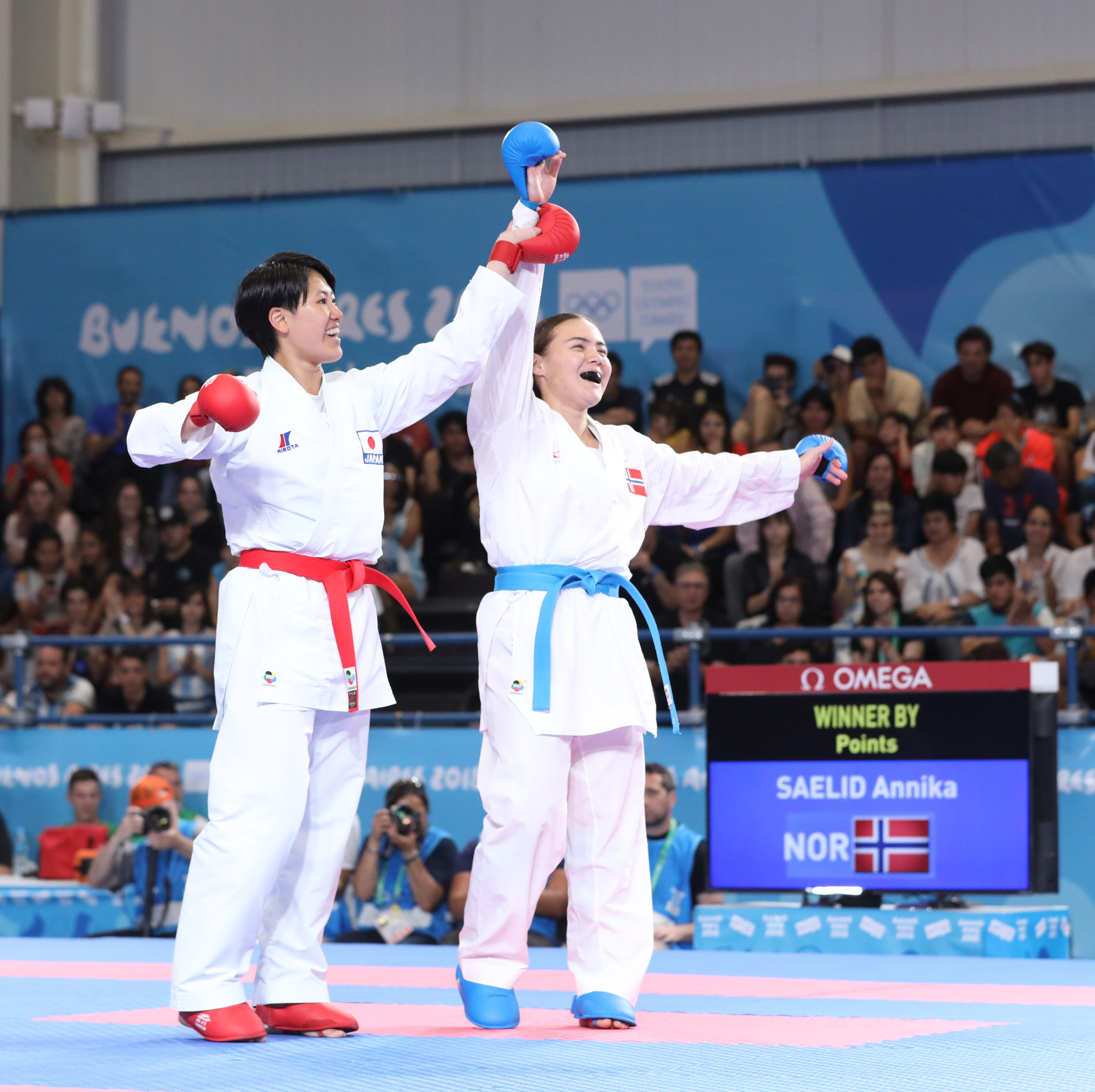
Sakura Sawashima celebrates Annika Sælid for her victory

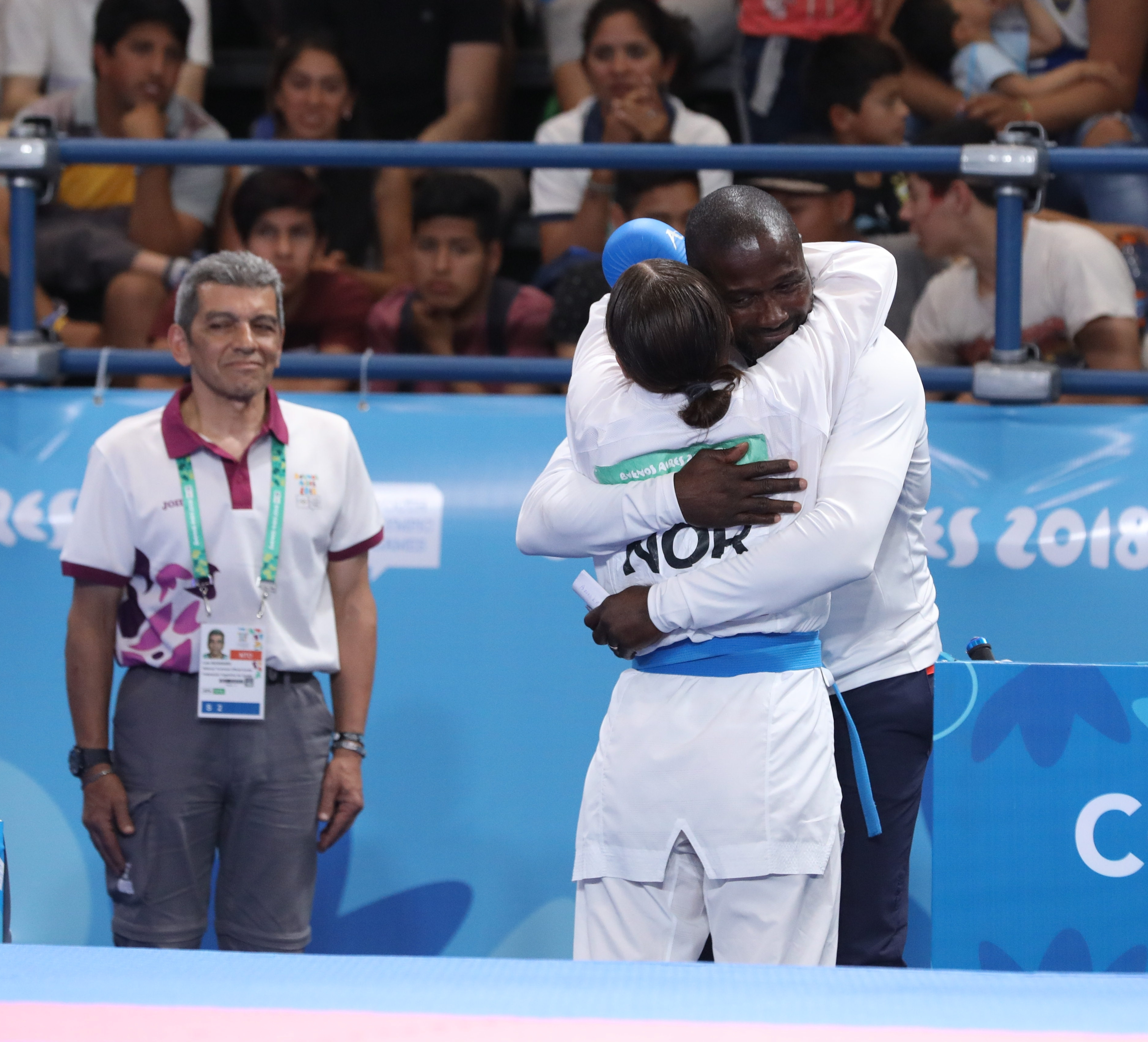
Annika Sælid gets congratulated by her trainer

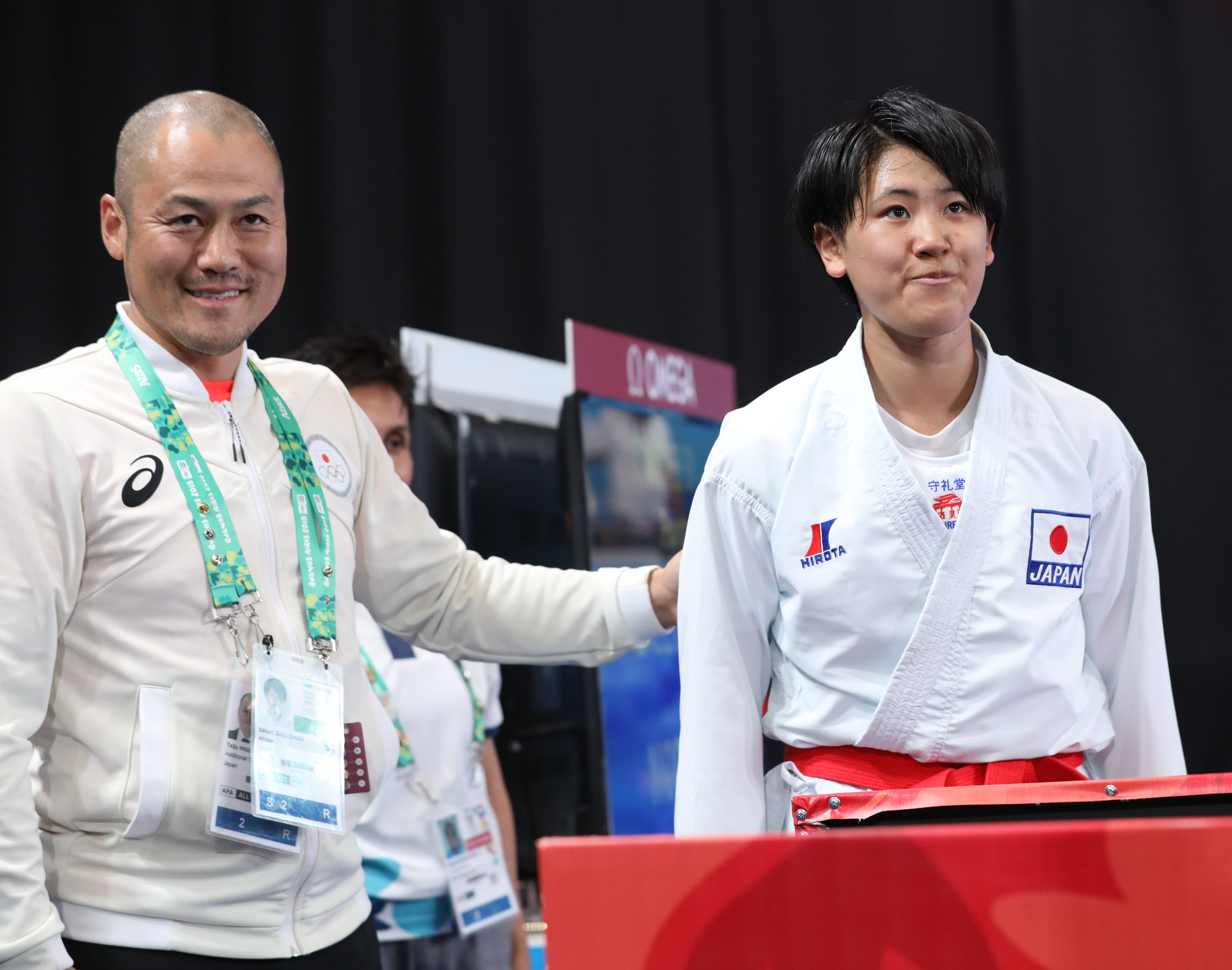
Sakura Sawashima and her trainer after the fight
