= Rowing at the 2023 Pan American Games – Women's eight =

Women's eight at the 2023 Pan American Games
- Venue: Laguna Grande
- Dates: October 24
- Competitors: 54 from 6 nations
- Winning time: 6:10.70

Medalists
Gold medal	Kendra Hartley; Olivia McMurray; Alizée Brien; Parker Illingworth; Abby Speirs; Shaye De Paiva; Abigail Dent; Leia Till; Kristen Kit	Canada
Silver medal	Cristina Pretto; Grace Joyce; Veronica Nicacio; Madeleine Focht; Katherine Horvat; Isabela Darvin; Lauren Miller; Hannah Paynter; Colette Lucas-Conwell	United States
Bronze medal	Christina Hostetter; Antonia Liewald; Antonia Hostetter; Victoria Hostetter; Antonia Abraham; Melita Abraham; Magdalena Nannig; Isidora Niemeyer; Isis Correa	Chile

The women's eight competition of the rowing events at the 2023 Pan American Games was held on October 24 at Laguna Grande in San Pedro de la Paz, Chile.

== Results ==
=== Final ===
The results were as follows:

Rank	Rowers	Country	Time	Notes
1st place, gold medalist(s)	Kendra Hartley; Olivia McMurray; Alizée Brien; Parker Illingworth; Abby Speirs; Shaye De Paiva; Abigail Dent; Leia Till; Kristen Kit	Canada	6:10.70	
2nd place, silver medalist(s)	Cristina Pretto; Grace Joyce; Veronica Nicacio; Madeleine Focht; Katherine Horvat; Isabela Darvin; Lauren Miller; Hannah Paynter; Colette Lucas-Conwell	United States	6:14.17	
3rd place, bronze medalist(s)	Christina Hostetter; Antonia Liewald; Antonia Hostetter; Victoria Hostetter; Antonia Abraham; Melita Abraham; Magdalena Nannig; Isidora Niemeyer; Isis Correa	Chile	6:14.78	
4	Catalina Deandrea; Oriana Ruiz; Ingrid Marcipar; Olivia Peralta; Sonia Baluzzo; Evelyn Silvestro; Clara Galfre; Flavia Chanampa; Joel Infante	Argentina	6:26.78	
5	Antônia Emanuelle Motta; Chloé Delazer; Dayane Pacheco; Isabella Ibeas; Maria Clara Lewenkopf; Milena Viana; Nathalia Barbosa; Shaiane Ucker; Isabelle Camargos	Brazil	6:27.90	
6	Melissa Marquez; Daniela Altamirano; Naomi Ramirez; Xinema Castellanos; Devanih Plata; María Sheccid García; Mildred Mercado; Maite Arrillaga; Myrtha Constant	Mexico	6:45.91	
