= Rowing at the 2023 Pan American Games – Men's eight =

Men's eight at the 2023 Pan American Games
- Venue: Laguna Grande
- Dates: October 23
- Competitors: 54 from 6 nations
- Winning time: 5:37.89

Medalists
Gold medal	Roberto Paz; Luis León; Henry Heredia; Francisco Romero; Andrey Barnet; Leduar Suárez; Carlos Ajete; Reidy Cardona; Juan Carlos González	Cuba
Silver medal	Bruno Cetraro; Felipe Klüver; Leandro Rodas; Mauricio López; Marcos Sarraute; Newton Seawright; Leandro Slavagno; Martín Zocalo; Romina Cetraro	Uruguay
Bronze medal	Oscar Vásquez; Brahim Alvayay; Marcelo Poo; Francisco Lapostol; Alfredo Abraham; Ignacio Abraham; Nahuel Reyes; Andoni Habash; Isidora Soto	Chile

The men's eight competition of the rowing events at the 2023 Pan American Games was held on October 23 at Laguna Grande in San Pedro de la Paz, Chile.

== Schedule ==
Date	Time	Round
October 23, 2023	10:30	Final

== Results ==
=== Final ===
The results were as follows:

Rank	Rowers	Country	Time	Notes
1st place, gold medalist(s)	Roberto Paz; Luis León; Henry Heredia; Francisco Romero; Andrey Barnet; Leduar Suárez; Carlos Ajete; Reidy Cardona; Juan Carlos González	Cuba	5:37.89	
2nd place, silver medalist(s)	Bruno Cetraro; Felipe Klüver; Leandro Rodas; Mauricio López; Marcos Sarraute; Newton Seawright; Leandro Slavagno; Martín Zocalo; Romina Cetraro	Uruguay	5:38.31	
3rd place, bronze medalist(s)	Oscar Vásquez; Brahim Alvayay; Marcelo Poo; Francisco Lapostol; Alfredo Abraham; Ignacio Abraham; Nahuel Reyes; Andoni Habash; Isidora Soto	Chile	5:38.42	
4	Sean Richardson; Alex Twist; Casey Fuller; Nicholas Ruggiero; Cooper Hurley; Mark Couwenhoven; Ezra Carlson; Alexander Hedge; Colette Lucas-Conwell	United States	5:47.48	
5	Joaquín Riveros; Martín Mansilla; Emiliano Calderón; Santiago Deandrea; Agustin Scenna; Ignacio Pacheco; Joel Romero; Axel Haack; Joel Infante	Argentina	5:48.48	
6	Ricardo De la Rosa; Marco Velazquez; Tomás Manzanillo; Jordy Gutiérrez; Hugo Reyes; Andre Simsch; Miguel Carballo; Alexis López; Myrtha Constant	Mexico	5:56.98	
