= Rowing at the 2023 Pan American Games – Women's coxless four =

Women's coxless four at the 2023 Pan American Games
- Venue: Laguna Grande
- Date: 24 October 2023
- Competitors: 24 from 6 nations
- Winning time: 6:40.83

Medalists
Gold medal	Magdalena Nannig; Victoria Hostetter; Melita Abraham; Antonia Abraham	Chile
Silver medal	Cristina Pretto; Isabela Darvin; Lauren Miller; Hannah Paynter	United States
Bronze medal	Devanih Plata; María Sheccid García; Mildred Mercado; Maite Arrillaga	Mexico

The women's coxless four competition of the rowing events at the 2023 Pan American Games was held on 24 October 2023 at Laguna Grande in San Pedro de la Paz, Chile.

== Schedule ==
Date	Time	Round
24 October 2023	10:00	Final

== Results ==
=== Final ===
The results were as follows:

Rank	Rowers	Country	Time	Notes
1st place, gold medalist(s)	Magdalena Nannig; Victoria Hostetter; Melita Abraham; Antonia Abraham	Chile	6:40.83	
2nd place, silver medalist(s)	Cristina Pretto; Isabela Darvin; Lauren Miller; Hannah Paynter	United States	6:44.41	
3rd place, bronze medalist(s)	Devanih Plata; María Sheccid García; Mildred Mercado; Maite Arrillaga	Mexico	6:44.59	
4	Kendra Hartley; Parker Illingsworth; Abby Speirs; Leia Till	Canada	6:44.82	
5	Shaiane Ucker; Maria Clara Lewenkopf; Milena Viana; Dayane Pacheco	Brazil	6:52.95	
6	Oriana Ruiz; Flavia Chanampa; Ingrid Marcipar; Olivia Peralta	Argentina	8:21.51	
