= Rowing at the 2023 Pan American Games – Mixed eight =

Mixed eight at the 2023 Pan American Games
- Venue: Laguna Grande
- Dates: October 21 – October 25
- Competitors: 72 from 8 nations
- Winning time: 5:54.26

Medalists
Gold medal	Cristina Pretto; Isabella Darvin; Lauren Miller; Hannah Paynter; James Plihal; Mark Couwenhoven; Ezra Carlson; Alexander Hedge; Colette Lucas-Conwell	United States
Silver medal	Christina Hostetter; Victoria Hostetter; Oscar Vásquez; Ignacio Abraham; Antonia Abraham; Melita Abraham; Alfredo Abraham; Francisco Lapostol; Isidora Soto	Chile
Bronze medal	Ana Jiménez; Milena Venega; Andrey Barnet; Leduar Suárez; Natalie Morales; Yariulvis Cobas; Carlos Ajete; Reidy Cardona; Juan Carlos González	Cuba

The mixed eight competition of the rowing events at the 2023 Pan American Games was held from October 21 to 25 at Laguna Grande in San Pedro de la Paz, Chile.

== Schedule ==
Date	Time	Round
October 21, 2023	12:00	Heat 1
October 21, 2023	12:10	Heat 2
October 22, 2023	11:20	Repechage
October 25, 2023	11:10	Final A

== Results ==
=== Heats ===
==== Heat 1 ====
Rank	Rowers	Country	Time	Notes
1	Christina Hostetter; Victoria Hostetter; Oscar Vásquez; Ignacio Abraham; Antonia Abraham; Melita Abraham; Alfredo Abraham; Francisco Lapostol; Isidora Soto	Chile	5:58.47	FA
2	Cristina Pretto; Isabella Darvin; Lauren Miller; Hannah Paynter; James Plihal; Mark Couwenhoven; Ezra Carlson; Alexander Hedge; Colette Lucas-Conwell	United States	5:58.51	R
3	Abby Speirs; Olivia McMurray; Emerson Harris; Stephen Harris; Quinn Storey; Connor Attridge; Abigail Dent; Leia Till; Kristen Kit	Canada	6:08.60	R
4	Shaiane Ucker; Dayane Pacheco; Milena Viana; Maria Clara Lewenkopf; Bernardo Boggian; Tomás Levy; Alef Fontoura; Piedro Tuchtenhagen; Isabella Ibeas	Brazil	6:19.86	R

==== Heat 2 ====
Rank	Rowers	Country	Time	Notes
1	Ana Jiménez; Milena Venega; Andrey Barnet; Leduar Suárez; Natalie Morales; Yariulvis Cobas; Carlos Ajete; Reidy Cardona; Juan Carlos González	Cuba	6:10.47	FA
2	Oriana Ruiz; Clara Galfre; Ingrid Marcipar; Olivia Peralta; Joaquín Riveros; Martín Mansilla; Emiliano Calderón; Santiago Deandrea; Joel Infante	Argentina	6:19.36	R
3	Melissa Marquez; Daniela Altamirano; Tomas Manzanillo; Andre Simsch; Ricardo de la Rosa; Marco Velazquez; Ximena Castellanos; Devanih Plata; Myrtha Constant	Mexico	6:20.84	R
4	Gabriela Mosqueira; Eliana Sosa; Alberto Portillo; Fiorella Rodríguez; Ahilin Sanabria; Arturo Rivarola; Matías Ramírez; Nicolás Villalba; Adriana Sanabria	Paraguay	6:26.37	R

=== Repechage ===
Rank	Rowers	Country	Time	Notes
1	Cristina Pretto; Isabella Darvin; Lauren Miller; Hannah Paynter; James Plihal; Mark Couwenhoven; Ezra Carlson; Alexander Hedge; Colette Lucas-Conwell	United States	5:54.79	FA
2	Abby Speirs; Olivia McMurray; Emerson Harris; Stephen Harris; Quinn Storey; Connor Attridge; Abigail Dent; Leia Till; Kristen Kit	Canada	6:00.72	FA
3	Oriana Ruiz; Clara Galfre; Ingrid Marcipar; Olivia Peralta; Joaquín Riveros; Martín Mansilla; Emiliano Calderón; Santiago Deandrea; Joel Infante	Argentina	6:06.08	FA
4	Shaiane Ucker; Dayane Pacheco; Milena Viana; Maria Clara Lewenkopf; Bernardo Boggian; Tomás Levy; Alef Fontoura; Piedro Tuchtenhagen; Isabella Ibeas	Brazil	6:08.39	FA
5	Melissa Marquez; Daniela Altamirano; Tomas Manzanillo; Andre Simsch; Ricardo de la Rosa; Marco Velazquez; Ximena Castellanos; Devanih Plata; Myrtha Constant	Mexico	6:12.93	FB
6	Gabriela Mosqueira; Eliana Sosa; Alberto Portillo; Fiorella Rodríguez; Ahilin Sanabria; Arturo Rivarola; Matías Ramírez; Nicolás Villalba; Adriana Sanabria	Paraguay	6:21.75	FB

=== Final B ===
Rank	Rowers	Country	Time	Notes
1	Melissa Marquez; Daniela Altamirano; Tomas Manzanillo; Andre Simsch; Ricardo de la Rosa; Marco Velazquez; Ximena Castellanos; Devanih Plata; Myrtha Constant	Mexico	6:23.60	
2	Gabriela Mosqueira; Eliana Sosa; Alberto Portillo; Fiorella Rodríguez; Ahilin Sanabria; Arturo Rivarola; Matías Ramírez; Nicolás Villalba; Adriana Sanabria	Paraguay	BUW	

=== Final A ===
Rank	Rowers	Country	Time	Notes
1st place, gold medalist(s)	Cristina Pretto; Isabella Darvin; Lauren Miller; Hannah Paynter; James Plihal; Mark Couwenhoven; Ezra Carlson; Alexander Hedge; Colette Lucas-Conwell	United States	5:54.26	
2nd place, silver medalist(s)	Christina Hostetter; Victoria Hostetter; Oscar Vásquez; Ignacio Abraham; Antonia Abraham; Melita Abraham; Alfredo Abraham; Francisco Lapostol; Isidora Soto	Chile	5:55.17	
3rd place, bronze medalist(s)	Ana Jiménez; Milena Venega; Andrey Barnet; Leduar Suárez; Natalie Morales; Yariulvis Cobas; Carlos Ajete; Reidy Cardona; Juan Carlos González	Cuba	5:58.50	
4	Abby Speirs; Olivia McMurray; Emerson Harris; Stephen Harris; Quinn Storey; Connor Attridge; Abigail Dent; Leia Till; Kristen Kit	Canada	5:58.70	
5	Shaiane Ucker; Dayane Pacheco; Milena Viana; Maria Clara Lewenkopf; Bernardo Boggian; Tomás Levy; Alef Fontoura; Piedro Tuchtenhagen; Isabella Ibeas	Brazil	6:03.80	
6	Oriana Ruiz; Clara Galfre; Ingrid Marcipar; Olivia Peralta; Joaquín Riveros; Martín Mansilla; Emiliano Calderón; Santiago Deandrea; Joel Infante	Argentina	6:10.84	
