= Rowing at the 2023 Pan American Games – Women's quadruple sculls =

Women's quadruple sculls at the 2023 Pan American Games
- Venue: Laguna Grande
- Dates: October 23
- Competitors: 24 from 6 nations
- Winning time: 6:26.04

Medalists
Gold medal	Grace Joyce; Veronica Nicacio; Madeleine Focht; Katherine Horvat	United States
Silver medal	Christina Hostetter; Victoria Hostetter; Melita Abraham; Antonia Abraham	Chile
Bronze medal	Kendra Hartley; Parker Illingworth; Alizée Brien; Shaye de Paiva	Canada

The women's quadruple sculls competition of the rowing events at the 2023 Pan American Games was held on October 23 at Laguna Grande in San Pedro de la Paz, Chile.

== Schedule ==
Date	Time	Round
October 23, 2023	9:10	Final

== Results ==
=== Final ===
The results were as follows:

Rank	Rowers	Country	Time	Notes
1st place, gold medalist(s)	Grace Joyce; Veronica Nicacio; Madeleine Focht; Katherine Horvat	United States	6:26.04	
2nd place, silver medalist(s)	Christina Hostetter; Victoria Hostetter; Melita Abraham; Antonia Abraham	Chile	6:26.81	
3rd place, bronze medalist(s)	Kendra Hartley; Parker Illingworth; Alizée Brien; Shaye de Paiva	Canada	6:35.62	
4	Thalita Soares; Beatriz Cardoso; Chloé Delazeri; Nathalia Barbosa	Brazil	6:41.18	
5	Ana Jiménez; Milena Venega; Natalie Morales; Yariulvis Cobas	Cuba	6:47.72	
6	Oriana Ruiz; Flavia Chanampa; Catalina Deandrea; Clara Galfre	Argentina	7:56.92	
