= Uruguay at the 2023 Pan American Games =

- IOC code: URU
- NOC: Uruguayan Olympic Committee

in Santiago, Chile 20 October 2023 – 5 November 2023
- Competitors: 178 in 28 sports
- Flag bearers (opening): Rodrigo Chagas & Camila Piñeiro
- Flag bearers (closing): Fernando Becerra & Leonella Acosta
- Medals Ranked 15th: Gold 2 Silver 5 Bronze 3 Total 10

Pan American Games appearances (overview)
- 1951; 1955; 1959; 1963; 1967; 1971; 1975; 1979; 1983; 1987; 1991; 1995; 1999; 2003; 2007; 2011; 2015; 2019; 2023; 2027

Uruguay competed at the 2023 Pan American Games in Santiago, Chile from 20 October to 5 November 2023. This was Uruguay's 19th appearance at the Pan American Games, having competed at every edition of the Games.

On 9 October 2023, the Uruguayan Olympic Committee officially named the team of 179 athletes (103 men and 76 women) competing in twenty nine sports.

Footballer Rodrigo Chagas and boxer Camila Piñeiro were the country's flagbearers during the opening ceremony. Meanwhile, sailor Fernando Becerra and basque pelota athlete Leonella Acosta were the country's flagbearers during the closing ceremony.

== Medalists ==
The following Uruguayan competitors won medals at the games. In the by discipline sections below, medalists' names are bolded.

Medal	Name	Sport	Event	Date
Gold	Bruno Cetraro; Marcos Sarraute; Felipe Klüver; Leandro Salvagno	Rowing	Men's quadruple sculls	October 23
Gold	Newton Seawright; Martín Zócalo	Rowing	Men's double sculls	October 25
Silver	Esteban Sosa; Leandro Rodas	Rowing	Men's coxless pair	October 23
Silver	Bruno Cetraro; Felipe Klüver; Leandro Rodas; Mauricio Lopez; Marcos Sarraute; Newton Seawright; Leandro Salvagno; Martín Zócalo; Romina Cetraro	Rowing	Men's eight	October 23
Silver	Fernando Diz; Hernán Umpierre	Sailing	Men's 49er	November 3
Silver	Déborah Rodríguez	Athletics	Women's 800 metres	November 4
Silver	Leonella Acosta	Basque pelota	Women's frontball	November 4
Bronze	Martín Zócalo; Marcos Sarraute; Newton Seawright; Leandro Salvagno	Rowing	Men's coxless four	October 24
Bronze	Eric Fagúndez	Cycling	Men's road race	October 29
Bronze	Sofía Vicente; Agustina Cuestas	Basque pelota	Women's doubles trinquete rubber ball	November 5

== Competitors ==
The following is the list of number of competitors (per gender) participating at the games per sport/discipline.

Sport	Men	Women	Total
Artistic swimming	0	2	2
Athletics	4	4	8
Basketball	4	4	8
Basque pelota	3	4	7
Boxing	2	1	3
Beach volleyball	2	2	4
Canoeing	4	0	4
Cycling	3	1	4
Equestrian	8	1	9
Field hockey	0	16	16
Football	18	0	18
Handball	14	14	28
Golf	0	2	2
Judo	1	0	1
Karate	2	0	2
Modern pentathlon	1	1	2
Roller sports	0	2	2
Rowing	10	7	17
Rugby sevens	12	0	12
Sailing	4	3	7
Shooting	2	0	2
Surfing	2	1	3
Swimming	2	4	6
Taekwondo	1	1	2
Tennis	0	2	2
Triathlon	1	1	2
Weightlifting	2	2	4
Wrestling	0	1	1
Total	102	76	178

== Artistic swimming ==
Uruguay qualified a team of two artistic swimmers at the 2022 South American Games.

Athlete	Event	Technical Routine		Free Routine (Final)			
Athlete	Event	Points	Rank	Points	Rank	Total Points	Rank
Agustina Medina; Lucía Ververi	Women's duet						

== Athletics ==
Uruguay qualified eight athletes (four men and four women) for the games.

Men
Track & road events

Athlete	Event	Semifinal		Final	
Athlete	Event	Time	Rank	Time	Rank
Santiago Catrofe	1500 m	—N/a			
Santiago Catrofe	5000 m	—N/a			
Santiago Catrofe	10000 m	—N/a			
Andrés Zamora	Marathon	—N/a			
Nicolás Cuestas	Marathon	—N/a			

Field events

Athlete	Event	Result	Rank
Emiliano Lasa	Long jump		

Women
Track & road events

Athlete	Event	Semifinal		Final	
Athlete	Event	Time	Rank	Time	Rank
Déborah Rodríguez	800 m				
María Pía Fernández	1500 m	—N/a			

Field events

Athlete	Event	Result	Rank
Lorena Aires	High Jump		
Manuela Rotundo	Javelin throw		

== Basketball ==
3x3

Summary

Team	Event	Preliminary round						Semifinal	Final / BM / Pl.	
Team	Event	Opposition Result	Opposition Result	Opposition Result	Opposition Result	Opposition Result	Rank	Opposition Result	Opposition Result	Rank
Uruguay men	Men's tournament									
Uruguay women	Women's tournament									

=== Men's tournament ===
Uruguay qualified a men's team (of 4 athletes) by finishing as one of the six best non qualified teams in the FIBA 3x3 Rankings.

Roster

- Santiago Ramírez
- Nicolás Borselino
- Rodrigo Cardoso
- Demian Álvarez

=== Women's tournament ===
Uruguay qualified a women's team (of 4 athletes) by finishing as one of the six best non qualified teams in the FIBA 3x3 Rankings.

Roster

- Lucía Auza
- Josefina Zeballos
- Lucía Schiavo
- Natasha Dolinski

== Basque pelota ==
Uruguay qualified a team of seven athletes (three men and four women) through the 2023 Pan American Basque Pelota Tournament.

Men

Athlete	Event	Preliminary round					Semifinal	Final / BM	Rank
Athlete	Event	Match 1	Match 2	Match 3	Match 4	Rank	Semifinal	Final / BM	Rank
Athlete	Event	Opposition Score	Opposition Score	Opposition Score	Opposition Score	Rank	Opposition Score	Opposition Score	Rank
Andrés Pintos; Manuel Pelúa	Rubber Pelota Doubles Trinquete								
José Airala	Frontball								

Women

Athlete	Event	Preliminary round					Semifinal	Final / BM	Rank
Athlete	Event	Match 1	Match 2	Match 3	Match 4	Rank	Semifinal	Final / BM	Rank
Athlete	Event	Opposition Score	Opposition Score	Opposition Score	Opposition Score	Rank	Opposition Score	Opposition Score	Rank
Macarena Morell	Fronton								
Agustina Cuestas; Sofía Vicente	Rubber Pelota Doubles Trinquete								
Leonella Acosta	Frontball								

== Beach volleyball ==
Uruguay qualified a men's and women's pair for a total of four athletes.

Athlete	Event	Group stage				Round of 16	Quarterfinal	Semifinal	Final / BM	
Athlete	Event	Opposition Result	Opposition Result	Opposition Result	Rank	Opposition Result	Opposition Result	Opposition Result	Opposition Result	Rank
Hans Hannibal; Nicolás Llambías	Men's					Bye				
Maribel Bianchi; Sol Acuña	Women's					Bye				

== Boxing ==
Uruguay qualified three boxers (two men and one woman).

Men

Athlete	Event	Round of 32	Round of 16	Quarterfinal	Semifinal	Final	
Athlete	Event	Opposition Result	Opposition Result	Opposition Result	Opposition Result	Opposition Result	Rank
Lucas Fernández	–57 kg	—N/a	Reyes (EAI); W 5–0	Oliveira (BRA)			
Alejandro Bottino	–63.5 kg						

Women

Athlete	Event	Quarterfinal	Semifinal	Final	
Athlete	Event	Opposition Result	Opposition Result	Opposition Result	Rank
Camila Piñeiro	–60 kg				

== Canoeing ==
=== Sprint ===
Uruguai qualified a total of four male sprint canoeists.

Men

Athlete	Event	Heat		Semifinal		Final	
Athlete	Event	Time	Rank	Time	Rank	Time	Rank
Matías Otero	K-1 1000 m						
Matías Otero; Julián Cabrera	K-2 500 m						
Matías Otero; Julián Cabrera; Sebastián Delgado; Santiago Melo	K-4 1000 m						

== Cycling ==
Uruguay qualified a total of 4 cyclists (3 men and 1 woman).

=== Road ===
Uruguay qualified 4 cyclists (three men and one woman) at the Pan American Championships.

Athlete	Event	Time	Rank
Roderyck Asconeguy	Men's road race		
Leonel Rodríguez	Men's road race		
Eric Fagúndez	Men's road time trial		
Agustina Reyes	Women's road race		

== Equestrian ==
Uruguay qualified a team of 9 equestrians (two in Dressage, four in Eventing and three in Jumping).

=== Dressage ===
Athlete	Horse	Event	Qualification						Grand Prix Freestyle / Intermediate I Freestyle	
Athlete	Horse	Event	Grand Prix / Prix St. Georges		Grand Prix Special / Intermediate I		Total		Grand Prix Freestyle / Intermediate I Freestyle	
Athlete	Horse	Event	Score	Rank	Score	Rank	Score	Rank	Score	Rank
Carolin Mallmann		Individual								
Ramón Becca		Individual								

=== Eventing ===
Athlete	Horse	Event	Dressage		Cross-country		Jumping		Total	
Athlete	Horse	Event	Points	Rank	Points	Rank	Points	Rank	Points	Rank
Edison Quintana		Individual								
Gastón Marcenal		Individual								
Rufino Domínguez		Individual								
Federico Daners		Individual								
Edison Quintana; Gastón Marcenal; Rufino Domínguez; Federico Daners	See above	Team								

=== Jumping ===
Athlete	Horse	Event	Qualification								Final					
Athlete	Horse	Event	Round 1		Round 2		Round 3		Total		Round A		Round B		Total	
Athlete	Horse	Event	Faults	Rank	Faults	Rank	Faults	Rank	Faults	Rank	Faults	Rank	Faults	Rank	Faults	Rank
Martín Rodríguez		Individual														
Sebastián Guarino		Individual														
Juan Serra		Individual														
Martín Rodríguez; Sebastián Guarino; Juan Serra	See above	Team									—N/a					

== Field hockey ==
Summary

Team	Event	Preliminary round				Quarterfinal	Semifinal	Final / BM / Pl.	
Team	Event	Opposition Result	Opposition Result	Opposition Result	Rank	Opposition Result	Opposition Result	Opposition Result	Rank
Uruguay women	Women's tournament	Argentina	Trinidad and Tobago	United States					

=== Women's tournament ===
Uruguay qualified a women's team of 16 athletes by finishing fifth at the 2022 Pan American Cup.

Roster

- Victoria Bate
- Camila de María
- Belén Barreiro
- Florencia Peñalba
- Lupe Curutchage
- Agustina Taborda
- Jimena García
- Elisa Civetta
- Milagros Algorta
- Kaisuami Dall'Orso
- Magdalena Gómez
- Constanza Barrandeguy
- Manuela Quiñones
- Manuela Vilar del Valle
- Teresa Viana
- Sol Amadeo

Group A

Pos	Team	Pld	W	D	L	GF	GA	GD	Pts	Qualification
1	Argentina	3	3	0	0	34	1	+33	9	Semi-finals
2	United States	3	2	0	1	19	5	+14	6	Semi-finals
3	Uruguay	3	1	0	2	11	11	0	3	5th–8th classification
4	Trinidad and Tobago	3	0	0	3	0	47	−47	0	5th–8th classification

Source: FIH
Rules for classification: 1) points; 2) matches won; 3) goal difference; 4) goals for; 5) head-to-head result; 6) field goals for.

26 October 2023
09:30

Argentina	8–0	Uruguay
Gorzelany 8', 15'; Jankunas 27', 43'; Granatto 29', 32'; Thome 35'; Trinchinetti 55'	Report

Umpires:
Ayanna McClean (TTO)
Meghan McClennan (CAN)

28 October 2023
09:30

Uruguay	11–0	Trinidad and Tobago
Amadeo 13', 27', 29'; Viana 21', 21', 48', 53'; Algorta 26'; Vilar 31', 35', 58'	Report

Umpires:
Melina Illanes (ARG)
Claudia Montino (CHI)

30 October 2023
17:30

Uruguay	0–3	United States
	Report	Tamer 27'; Sholder 28'; Sessa 29'

Umpires:
Megan Robertson (CAN)
Melina Illanes (ARG)

== Football ==
=== Men's tournament ===
Uruguay qualified a men's team of 18 athletes by virtue of its campaign in the 2023 South American U-20 Championship.

Roster

- Ramiro Méndez
- Facundo Machado
- Alan Saldivia
- Renzo Orehuela
- Martín Gianolli
- Jairo O'Neill
- Edhard Greising
- Sebastián Figueredo
- Vicente Poggi
- Francisco Barrios
- Rodrigo Chagas
- Manuel Monzeglio
- Joaquín Lavega
- Juan Cruz de los Santos
- Diego Hernández
- Rodrigo Piñeiro
- Emiliano Rodríguez
- Dylan Nandín

Summary

Key:

- A.E.T – After extra time.
- P – Match decided by penalty-shootout.

Team	Event	Group Stage				Semifinal	Final / BM	
Team	Event	Opposition Score	Opposition Score	Opposition Score	Rank	Opposition Score	Opposition Score	Rank
Uruguay men's	Men's tournament							

== Golf ==
Uruguay qualified two female golfers.

Athlete	Event	Round 1	Round 2	Round 3	Round 4	Total		
Athlete	Event	Score	Score	Score	Score	Score	Par	Rank
María Paz Marques	Women's individual							
Chloe Stevenazzi	Women's individual							

== Handball ==
Summary

Team	Event	Group stage				Semifinal	Final / BM / Pl.	
Team	Event	Opposition Result	Opposition Result	Opposition Result	Rank	Opposition Result	Opposition Result	Rank
Uruguay men	Men's tournament	Cuba	Argentina	United States				
Uruguay women	Women's tournament	Cuba	Brazil	Paraguay				

=== Men's tournament ===
Uruguay qualified a men's team (of 14 athletes) by finishing as the second best team not yet qualified in the 2022 South American Games.

Roster

- Felipe Navarrete
- Andrés Viera
- Facundo Liston
- Gabriel Chapparro
- Máximo Cancio
- Rodrigo Botejara
- Diego Falabrino
- Maximiliano de Agrela
- Federico Rubbo
- Francisco Ancheta
- Facundo Lima
- Cristhian Rostagno
- Matías Etcheverry
- Bruno Borba

Group B

Pos	Team	Pld	W	D	L	GF	GA	GD	Pts	Qualification
1	Argentina	3	3	0	0	93	50	+43	6	Semifinals
2	United States	3	2	0	1	78	86	−8	4	Semifinals
3	Uruguay	3	1	0	2	71	95	−24	2	5–8th place semifinals
4	Cuba	3	0	0	3	72	83	−11	0	5–8th place semifinals

Source: Santiago 2023
Rules for classification: 1) points; 2) head-to-head points; 3) head-to-head goal difference; 4) head-to-head goals scored; 5) goal difference; 6) goals scored; 7) draw.

30 October 2023; 10:00	Cuba	24–25	Uruguay	Gimnasio Polideportivo de Viña del Mar; Referees: Hansen, Madsen (DEN)
30 October 2023; 10:00	Cordiés 8	(13–13)	Rubbo 9	Gimnasio Polideportivo de Viña del Mar; Referees: Hansen, Madsen (DEN)
30 October 2023; 10:00	1× (yellow card) 2× (suspension)	Report		Gimnasio Polideportivo de Viña del Mar; Referees: Hansen, Madsen (DEN)

31 October 2023; 12:30	Uruguay	16–37	Argentina	Gimnasio Polideportivo de Viña del Mar; Referees: Magalhães, Godoy (BRA)
31 October 2023; 12:30	Cancio 5	(7–19)	F. Pizarro 9	Gimnasio Polideportivo de Viña del Mar; Referees: Magalhães, Godoy (BRA)
31 October 2023; 12:30		Report	1× (yellow card) 3× (suspension)	Gimnasio Polideportivo de Viña del Mar; Referees: Magalhães, Godoy (BRA)

1 November 2023; 10:00	United States	34–30	Uruguay	Gimnasio Polideportivo de Viña del Mar; Referees: Hansen, Madsen (DEN)
1 November 2023; 10:00	Fofana 6	(19–15)	Cancio 9	Gimnasio Polideportivo de Viña del Mar; Referees: Hansen, Madsen (DEN)
1 November 2023; 10:00	3× (suspension)	Report	1× (yellow card) 1× (suspension) 1× (red card)	Gimnasio Polideportivo de Viña del Mar; Referees: Hansen, Madsen (DEN)

=== Women's tournament ===
Uruguay qualified a women's team (of 14 athletes) by winning the Last chance qualification tournament.

Roster

- Agustina Modernell
- Viviana Hergatacorzian
- Catalina Tournier
- Valentina Bastarrica
- Lucía Merlí
- Julieta Pessina
- Alejandra Scarrone
- Rosina González
- Viviana Ferrari
- Sabrina Grieco
- Camila Bianco
- Paula Eastman
- Martina Barreiro
- Sabrina Golda

Group B

Pos	Team	Pld	W	D	L	GF	GA	GD	Pts	Qualification
1	Brazil	3	3	0	0	104	35	+69	6	Semifinals
2	Paraguay	3	1	0	2	68	76	−8	2 (Note: Paraguay 2 Pts, +4 GD; Cuba 2 Pts, –1 GD; Uruguay 2 Pts, –3 GD)	Semifinals
3	Cuba	3	1	0	2	62	101	−39	2	5–8th place semifinals
4	Uruguay	3	1	0	2	53	75	−22	2	5–8th place semifinals

Source: Santiago 2023
Rules for classification: 1) points; 2) head-to-head points; 3) head-to-head goal difference; 4) head-to-head goals scored; 5) goal difference; 6) goals scored; 7) draw.
Notes:

24 October 2023; 10:00	Cuba	25–21	Uruguay	Gimnasio Polideportivo de Viña del Mar; Referees: Hansen, Madsen (DEN)
24 October 2023; 10:00	Reyes, Téllez 5	(13–6)	Barreiro 5	Gimnasio Polideportivo de Viña del Mar; Referees: Hansen, Madsen (DEN)
24 October 2023; 10:00	7× (suspension)	Report	2× (suspension)	Gimnasio Polideportivo de Viña del Mar; Referees: Hansen, Madsen (DEN)

25 October 2023; 10:00	Uruguay	9–28	Brazil	Gimnasio Polideportivo de Viña del Mar; Referees: Correa, Conberse (ARG)
25 October 2023; 10:00	Bianco 6	(5–17)	Araújo 5	Gimnasio Polideportivo de Viña del Mar; Referees: Correa, Conberse (ARG)
25 October 2023; 10:00	2× (suspension)	Report	2× (suspension)	Gimnasio Polideportivo de Viña del Mar; Referees: Correa, Conberse (ARG)

26 October 2023; 10:00	Paraguay	22–23	Uruguay	Gimnasio Polideportivo de Viña del Mar; Referees: Hansen, Madsen (DEN)
26 October 2023; 10:00	Fernández 8	(9–11)	Bianco 5	Gimnasio Polideportivo de Viña del Mar; Referees: Hansen, Madsen (DEN)
26 October 2023; 10:00	5× (suspension) 1× (red card)	Report	3× (suspension)	Gimnasio Polideportivo de Viña del Mar; Referees: Hansen, Madsen (DEN)

== Judo ==
Uruguay has qualified one male judoka.

Athlete	Event	Round of 16	Quarterfinals	Semifinals	Repechage	Final / BM	
Athlete	Event	Opposition Result	Opposition Result	Opposition Result	Opposition Result	Opposition Result	Rank
Alain Aprahamian	Men's 81 kg						

== Karate ==
Uruguay qualified a team of 2 male karatekas at the 2022 South American Games.

Kumite

Athlete	Event	Round robin				Semifinal	Final	
Athlete	Event	Opposition Result	Opposition Result	Opposition Result	Rank	Opposition Result	Opposition Result	Rank
Maximiliano Larrosa	Men's −60 kg							
Francisco Barrios	Men's −75 kg							

== Modern pentathlon ==
Uruguay qualified two modern pentathletes (one man and one woman).

Athlete	Event	Fencing (Épée one touch)				Swimming (200 m freestyle)			Riding (Show jumping)			Shooting / Running (10 m laser pistol / 3000 m cross-country)			Total	
Athlete	Event	V – D	Rank	MP points	BP	Time	Rank	MP points	Penalties	Rank	MP points	Time	Rank	MP points	MP points	Rank
Bryan Blanco	Men's individual															
Valentina la Cruz	Women's individual															
Bryan Blanco; Valentina la Cruz	Mixed relay															

== Roller sports ==
=== Figure ===
Uruguay qualified a female athlete in figure skating.

Athlete	Event	Short program		Long program		Total	
Athlete	Event	Score	Rank	Score	Rank	Score	Rank
Romina Franca	Women's						

=== Skateboarding ===
Uruguay qualified a female athlete in skateboarding.

Women

Athlete	Event	Score	Rank
Julieta González	Street	144.25	5

== Rowing ==
Uruguay qualified a team of 17 athletes (ten men and seve women).

Men

Athlete	Event	Heat		Repechage		Semifinal		Final A/B	
Athlete	Event	Time	Rank	Time	Rank	Time	Rank	Time	Rank
	Single sculls								
	Double sculls					—N/a			
	Quadruple sculls			—N/a					
	Pair			—N/a					
	Four			—N/a					
	Lightweight Double sculls					—N/a			

Women

Athlete	Event	Heat		Repechage		Semifinal		Final A/B	
Athlete	Event	Time	Rank	Time	Rank	Time	Rank	Time	Rank
	Single sculls								
	Double sculls					—N/a			
	Pair			—N/a					
	Lightweight Double sculls					—N/a			

Mixed

Athlete	Event	Final	
Athlete	Event	Time	Rank
	Eight		

== Rugby sevens ==
=== Men's tournament ===
Uruguay qualified a men's team (of 12 athletes) after finishing third at the 2022 South American Games.

Summary

Team	Event	Group stage				Semifinal	Final / BM / Pl.	
Team	Event	Opposition Result	Opposition Result	Opposition Result	Rank	Opposition Result	Opposition Result	Rank
Uruguay men	Men's tournament							

== Sailing ==
Uruguay has qualified 5 boats for a total of 7 sailors.

Men

Athlete	Event	Race													Total	
Athlete	Event	1	2	3	4	5	6	7	8	9	10	11	12	M	Points	Rank
Stefano Caiafa	Laser radial											—N/a				
Fernando Diz; Hernán Umpierre	49er															

Women

Athlete	Event	Race													Total	
Athlete	Event	1	2	3	4	5	6	7	8	9	10	11	12	M	Points	Rank
Dolores Fraschini	Laser radial											—N/a				
Agnese Caiafa	Laser radial											—N/a				

Mixed

Athlete	Event	Race													Total	
Athlete	Event	1	2	3	4	5	6	7	8	9	10	11	12	M	Points	Rank
Pablo Defazio; Dominique Knuppel	Snipe											—N/a				

== Shooting ==
Uruguay qualified a total of two shooters.

Men

Pistol and rifle

Athlete	Event	Qualification		Final	
Athlete	Event	Points	Rank	Points	Rank
Rudi Lausarot	10 m air rifle				

Shotgun

Athlete	Event	Qualification		Semifinal		Final / BM	
Athlete	Event	Points	Rank	Points	Rank	Opposition Result	Rank
Franco González	Trap						

== Surfing ==
Uruguay qualified three surfers (two men and one woman).

Artistic

Athlete	Event	Round 1	Round 2	Round 3	Round 4	Repechage 1	Repechage 2	Repechage 3	Repechage 4	Repechage 5	Final / BM	
Athlete	Event	Opposition Result	Opposition Result	Opposition Result	Opposition Result	Opposition Result	Opposition Result	Opposition Result	Opposition Result	Opposition Result	Opposition Result	Rank
Julián Schweizer	Men's Longboard											
Inés Beisso	Women's Longboard											

Race

Athlete	Event	Time	Rank
Lukas Rodríguez	Men's stand up paddleboard		

== Swimming ==
Uruguay qualified a team of six swimmers (two men and four women).

Men

- Leo Nolles
- Diego Aranda

Women

- Abril Aunchayna
- Nicole Frank
- Luna Chabat
- Angelina Solari

== Taekwondo ==
Uruguay qualified two athletes for a Kyorugi event.

Kyorugi
Men

Athlete	Event	Round of 16	Quarterfinals	Semifinals	Repechage	Final / BM	
Athlete	Event	Opposition Result	Opposition Result	Opposition Result	Opposition Result	Opposition Result	Rank
Federico González	Men's 68 kg						
María Sara Grippoli	Women's 49 kg						

== Tennis ==
Uruguay qualified two female tennis players.

Women

Athlete	Event	Round of 64	Round of 32	Round of 16	Quarterfinal	Semifinal	Final / BM	
Athlete	Event	Opposition Result	Opposition Result	Opposition Result	Opposition Result	Opposition Result	Opposition Result	Rank
Taly Licht	Singles							
Juliana Rodríguez	Singles							
Taly Licht; Juliana Rodríguez	Doubles	—N/a	Bye					

== Triathlon ==
Uruguay qualified a team of two triathletes (one per gender).

Athlete	Event	Swim (1.5 km)	Trans 1	Bike (40 km)	Trans 2	Run (10 km)	Total	Rank
Federico Scarabino	Men's individual							
Clara Zubillaga	Women's individual							

== Weightlifting ==
Uruguay qualified four weightlifters (two men and two women).

Athlete	Event	Snatch		Clean & Jerk		Total	Rank
Athlete	Event	Result	Rank	Result	Rank	Total	Rank
Lucas Olivera	Men's 73 kg						
Emiliano Picún	Men's 102 kg						
Paola Marsicano	Women's 71 kg						
Eugenia Berger	Women's 81 kg						

== Wrestling ==
Uruguay received a wildcard to enter one female wrestler.

Key:

- VT – Victory by fall.
- PP – Decision by points – the loser with technical points.
- PO – Decision by points – the loser without technical points.
- SP – Technical superiority – the loser with technical points and a margin of victory of at least 9 (Greco-Roman) or 10 (freestyle) points.
- ST – Great superiority – the loser without technical points and a margin of victory of at least 8 (Greco-Roman) or 10 (freestyle) points.
- VA – Decision by withdrawal

Women

Athlete	Event	Quarterfinal	Semifinal	Final / BM	
Athlete	Event	Opposition Result	Opposition Result	Opposition Result	Rank
Mahealani Ramírez	76 kg				

== Demonstration Sports ==
=== E-sports ===
Uruguay qualified one athlete.

Men

- Williams Freire
