= Alizée Brien =

Canadian rower (born 1993)

Personal information
- Nationality: Canada
- Born: September 27, 1993 (age 32) Sainte-Agathe, Quebec
- Home town: Val-David, Quebec

Sport
- Sport: Road cycling Rowing
- College team: Montréal
Medal record
Women's rowing
Representing Canada
Pan American Games
Gold medal – first place	2023 Santiago	Eight
Bronze medal – third place	2023 Santiago	Double sculls
Bronze medal – third place	2023 Santiago	Quadruple sculls

Alizée Brien (born September 27, 1993) is a national team rower from Canada and former professional cyclist. Brien was a Pan American Games champion when she won gold as part of the women's eight at the 2023 Pan American Games in Santiago, as well as adding a bronze in both the double and the quadruple sculls.

== Career ==
=== Cycling ===
As a cyclist, Brien won a gold medal in the women's road race and a silver in the time trial at the 2013 Canada Games. She went competitive as a professional cyclist with Tibco-Silicon Valley Bank from 2015-2016. She competed at the 2015 UCI Road World Championships with the team, finishing in 11th place in the women's team time trial. By 2017 she was riding only on the provincial cycling team, Équipe du Québec, and did not have other professional offers, thus she was riding almost solely on the provincial circuit rather than internationally.

=== Rowing ===
After the 2020 Summer Olympics, Brien realized she would not achieve her Olympic dream as a cyclist. In 2021, she spoke to her former coach at the Montreal Rowing Club and asked him if he thought she had a chance to compete in the sport as an Olympian, to which he agreed it could be possible. Within a month, Brien had quit her job as an engineer, started studying psychology at Université de Montréal and switched sports, taking up rowing with a goal of attending the 2024 Summer Olympics. She won both of her events at the 2022 Royal Canadian Henley Regatta, winning both her single scull races.

In February 2023, Brien was named to the Canadian Pan American Games Qualification Regatta team. She placed 4th in the Women's Single Sculls event, thereby qualifying a quota spot for Canada at the Pan American Games (Rowing at the 2023 Pan American Games – Qualification).

Brien attended the 2023 Pan American Games in Santiago as a member of the Canadian rowing team, the first time she rowed competitively internationally in crew boats rather than solo. There, she won gold in the women's eights, while also winning a bronze medal in the double sculls with Shaye de Paiva and another bronze in the quadruple sculls together with Kendra Hartley, Parker Illingworth, and Shaye de Paiva. Following her three medal games, she told Rowing Canada of her Pan Am Games experience that "There have been a lot of memorable moments for me this week. But I think it has been the team and the team spirit that I will remember the most. Winning a gold medal in the eight was incredible but being part of the team and being with the support staff and getting to experience the Games with the crowds and volunteers, has been a lot of fun."

== Personal ==
Brien received her bachelor's degree in mechanical engineering and worked as a junior engineer before going back to the Université de Montréal to study for a degree in psychology, where she also competed on the collegiate rowing teams for the Montreal Carabins.
