= Rowing at the 2023 Pan American Games – Women's coxless pair =

Women's coxless pair at the 2023 Pan American Games
- Venue: Laguna Grande
- Dates: October 21 – October 23
- Competitors: 20 from 10 nations
- Winning time: 7:15.85

Medalists
| Gold medal | Hannah Paynter; Isabela Darvin | United States |
| Silver medal | Olivia McMurray; Abigail Dent | Canada |
| Bronze medal | Nicole Martinez; Alejandra Alonso | Paraguay |

The women's coxless pair competition of the rowing events at the 2023 Pan American Games was held from October 21 to 23 at Laguna Grande in San Pedro de la Paz, Chile.

== Schedule ==
| Date | Time | Round |
|---|---|---|
| October 21, 2023 | 8:00 | Heat 1 |
| October 21, 2023 | 9:10 | Heat 2 |
| October 22, 2023 | 9:00 | Repechage |
| October 23, 2023 | 8:20 | Final B |
| October 23, 2023 | 8:40 | Final A |

== Results ==
=== Heats ===
==== Heat 1 ====
| Rank | Rowers | Country | Time | Notes |
|---|---|---|---|---|
| 1 | Olivia McMurray; Abigail Dent | Canada | 7:37:96 | FA |
| 2 | Antonia Zanetta; Magdalena Nannig | Chile | 7:44:53 | FA |
| 3 | Valeria Olivera; Yuliana Etchebarne | Uruguay | 7:54:04 | R |
| 4 | María Isabel Vanegas; Evidelia Gonzalez | Nicaragua | 8:17:86 | R |
| 5 | Yendris Vasquez; Francis Chacin | Venezuela | 8:47:20 | R |

==== Heat 2 ====
| Rank | Rowers | Country | Time | Notes |
|---|---|---|---|---|
| 1 | Hannah Paynter; Isabela Darvin | United States | 7:30:39 | FA |
| 2 | Nicole Martinez; Alejandra Alonso | Paraguay | 7:34:41 | FA |
| 3 | Milena Matias; Maria Araujo | Brazil | 7:43:64 | R |
| 4 | Ingrid Marcipar; Olivia Peralta | Argentina | 7:47:54 | R |
| 5 | María García; Devanih Plata | Mexico | 7:54:78 | R |

=== Repechage ===
| Rank | Rowers | Country | Time | Notes |
|---|---|---|---|---|
| 1 | Milena Matias; Maria Araujo | Brazil | 7:29.61 | FA |
| 2 | Ingrid Marcipar; Olivia Peralta | Argentina | 7:30.49 | FA |
| 3 | María García; Devanih Plata | Mexico | 7:42.26 | FB |
| 4 | Valeria Olivera; Yuliana Etchebarne | Uruguay | 7:48.75 | FB |
| 5 | María Isabel Vanegas; Evidelia Gonzalez | Nicaragua | 8:08.90 | FB |
| 6 | Yendris Vasquez; Francis Chacin | Venezuela | 8:45.03 | FB |

=== Final B ===
| Rank | Rowers | Country | Time | Notes |
|---|---|---|---|---|
| 7 | María García; Devanih Plata | Mexico | 7:38.37 | |
| 8 | Valeria Olivera; Yuliana Etchebarne | Uruguay | 7:45.55 | |
| 9 | María Isabel Vanegas; Evidelia Gonzalez | Nicaragua | 7:59.60 | |
| 10 | Yendris Vasquez; Francis Chacin | Venezuela | 8:50.93 | |

=== Final A ===
| Rank | Rowers | Country | Time | Notes |
|---|---|---|---|---|
| 1st place, gold medalist(s) | Hannah Paynter; Isabela Darvin | United States | 7:15.85 | |
| 2nd place, silver medalist(s) | Olivia McMurray; Abigail Dent | Canada | 7:20.64 | |
| 3rd place, bronze medalist(s) | Nicole Martinez; Alejandra Alonso | Paraguay | 7:21.19 | |
| 4 | Milena Matias; Maria Araujo | Brazil | 7:22.63 | |
| 5 | Ingrid Marcipar; Olivia Peralta | Argentina | 7:29.29 | |
| 6 | Antonia Zanetta; Magdalena Nannig | Chile | 7:29.59 | |
