= Rowing at the 2023 Pan American Games – Men's double sculls =

Men's double sculls at the 2023 Pan American Games
- Venue: Laguna Grande
- Dates: October 21 – October 25
- Competitors: 26 from 13 nations
- Winning time: 6:22.07

Medalists
| Gold medal | Newton Seawright; Martín Zocalo | Uruguay |
| Silver medal | Reidy Cardona; Carlos Ajete | Cuba |
| Bronze medal | Casey Fuller; Mark Couwenhoven | United States |

The men's double sculls competition of the rowing events at the 2023 Pan American Games was held from October 21 to 25 at Laguna Grande in San Pedro de la Paz, Chile.

== Schedule ==
| Date | Time | Round |
|---|---|---|
| October 21, 2023 | 9:10 | Heat 1 |
| October 21, 2023 | 9:20 | Heat 2 |
| October 21, 2023 | 9:30 | Heat 3 |
| October 22, 2023 | 8:10 | Repechage |
| October 24, 2023 | 8:00 | Semifinal A/B 1 |
| October 24, 2023 | 8:10 | Semifinal A/B 2 |
| October 25, 2023 | 8:30 | Final A |
| October 25, 2023 | 9:10 | Final B |

== Results ==
=== Heats ===
==== Heat 1 ====
| Rank | Rowers | Country | Time | Notes |
|---|---|---|---|---|
| 1 | Agustín Scenna; Axel Haack | Argentina | 6:49:28 | SA/B |
| 2 | Brahim Alvayay; Andoni Habash | Chile | 6:50:47 | SA/B |
| 3 | Piedro Xavier; Tomas Garcia | Brazil | 6:52:59 | SA/B |
| 4 | Andre Mora; Jaime Machado | Venezuela | 6:58:55 | R |
| 5 | Michael Ciepiela; Riu Xu | Canada | 6:58:77 | R |

==== Heat 2 ====
| Rank | Rowers | Country | Time | Notes |
|---|---|---|---|---|
| 1 | Newton Seawright; Martín Zocalo | Uruguay | 6:42:37 | SA/B |
| 2 | Casey Fuller; Mark Couwenhoven | United States | 6:43:30 | SA/B |
| 3 | Miguel Carballo; Alexis López | Mexico | 7:15:95 | SA/B |
| 4 | Alberto Portillo; Nicolás Villalba | Paraguay | 7:18:68 | R |

==== Heat 3 ====
| Rank | Rowers | Country | Time | Notes |
|---|---|---|---|---|
| 1 | Reidy Cardona; Carlos Ajete | Cuba | 7:06:75 | SA/B |
| 2 | Víctor Aspillaga; Vincenzo Giurfa | Peru | 7:10:89 | SA/B |
| 3 | Juan Luis Esquea; Jancarlos Tineo | Dominican Republic | 7:25:83 | SA/B |
| 4 | Maynor López; Francesco Alonzo | Independent Athletes Team | 7:34:76 | R |

=== Repechage ===
| Rank | Rowers | Country | Time | Notes |
|---|---|---|---|---|
| 1 | Michael Ciepiela; Riu Xu | Canada | 6:43:14 | SA/B |
| 2 | Andre Mora; Jaime Machado | Venezuela | 6:43:54 | SA/B |
| 3 | Alberto Portillo; Nicolás Villalba | Paraguay | 7:09:22 | SA/B |
| 4 | Maynor López; Francesco Alonzo | Independent Athletes Team | 7:19:70 | R |

=== Semifinal A/B 1 ===
| Rank | Rowers | Country | Time | Notes |
|---|---|---|---|---|
| 1 | Casey Fuller; Mark Couwenhoven | United States | 6:32.77 | FA |
| 2 | Reidy Cardona; Carlos Ajete | Cuba | 6:40.64 | FA |
| 3 | Agustín Scenna; Axel Haack | Argentina | 6:41.81 | FA |
| 4 | Andre Mora; Jaime Machado | Venezuela | 6:43.25 | FB |
| 5 | Alberto Portillo; Nicolás Villalba | Paraguay | 6:55.62 | FB |
| 6 | Juan Luis Esquea; Jancarlos Tineo | Dominican Republic | 7:15.75 | FB |

=== Semifinal A/B 2 ===
| Rank | Rowers | Country | Time | Notes |
|---|---|---|---|---|
| 1 | Piedro Xavier; Tomas Garcia | Brazil | 6:34.14 | FA |
| 2 | Newton Seawright; Martín Zocalo | Uruguay | 6:36.86 | FA |
| 3 | Brahim Alvayay; Andoni Habash | Chile | 6:38.07 | FA |
| 4 | Michael Ciepiela; Riu Xu | Canada | 6:38.13 | FB |
| 5 | Víctor Aspillaga; Vincenzo Giurfa | Peru | 7:00.08 | FB |
| 6 | Miguel Carballo; Alexis López | Mexico | DNS | |

=== Final B ===
| Rank | Rowers | Country | Time | Notes |
|---|---|---|---|---|
| 1 | Michael Ciepiela; Riu Xu | Canada | 6:40.66 | |
| 2 | Andre Mora; Jaime Machado | Venezuela | 6:41.77 | |
| 3 | Alberto Portillo; Nicolás Villalba | Paraguay | 7:00.79 | |
| 4 | Juan Luis Esquea; Jancarlos Tineo | Dominican Republic | 7:11.48 | |
| | Víctor Aspillaga; Vincenzo Giurfa | Peru | DNS | |

=== Final A ===
| Rank | Rowers | Country | Time | Notes |
|---|---|---|---|---|
| 1st place, gold medalist(s) | Newton Seawright; Martín Zocalo | Uruguay | 6:22.07 | |
| 2nd place, silver medalist(s) | Reidy Cardona; Carlos Ajete | Cuba | 6:23.69 | |
| 3rd place, bronze medalist(s) | Casey Fuller; Mark Couwenhoven | United States | 6:26.70 | |
| 4 | Agustín Scenna; Axel Haack | Argentina | 6:30.04 | |
| 5 | Piedro Xavier; Tomas Garcia | Brazil | 6:36.06 | |
| 6 | Brahim Alvayay; Andoni Habash | Chile | 6:37.45 | |
