= Rowing at the 2023 Pan American Games – Men's coxless four =

Men's coxless four at the 2023 Pan American Games
- Venue: Laguna Grande
- Dates: October 24
- Competitors: 24 from 6 nations
- Winning time: 5:58.18

Medalists
Gold medal	Alfredo Abraham; Ignacio Abraham; Nahuel Reyes; Marcelo Poo	Chile
Silver medal	Andrey Barnet; Leduar Sánchez; Carlos Ajete; Reidy Cardona	Cuba
Bronze medal	Newton Seawright; Martín Zocalo; Marvos Sarraute; Leandro Salvagno	Uruguay

The men's coxless four competition of the rowing events at the 2023 Pan American Games was held on October 24 at Laguna Grande in San Pedro de la Paz, Chile.

== Schedule ==
Date	Time	Round
October 24, 2023	10:10	Final

== Results ==
=== Final ===
The results were as follows:

Rank	Rowers	Country	Time	Notes
1st place, gold medalist(s)	Alfredo Abraham; Ignacio Abraham; Nahuel Reyes; Marcelo Poo	Chile	5:58.18	
2nd place, silver medalist(s)	Andrey Barnet; Leduar Sánchez; Carlos Ajete; Reidy Cardona	Cuba	5:58.68	
3rd place, bronze medalist(s)	Newton Seawright; Martín Zocalo; Marvos Sarraute; Leandro Salvagno	Uruguay	6:01.91	
4	Joaquín Riveros; Ignacio Pacheco; Santiago Deandrea; Joel Romero	Argentina	6:08.28	
5	Nicholas Ruggiero; Luke Rein; Casey Fuller; Cooper Hurley	United States	6:12.32	
6	Marco Velazquez; Jordy Gutiérrez; Hugo Reyes; Rafael Mejía	Mexico	6:12.36	
