= Colette Lucas-Conwell =

American coxswain

Colette Vanlucas (Lucas-Conwell)
Personal information
- Nationality: French-American
- Born: Colette Lucas-Conwell Paris, France
- Education: University of Virginia
- Height: 5 ft 5 in (165 cm)
- Weight: 120 lb (54 kg)

Sport
- Sport: Rowing
Medal record
Women's rowing
Representing United States
Pan American Games
Gold medal – first place	2023 Santiago	Mixed Eight
Silver medal – second place	2023 Santiago	Women's eight
World Rowing U23 Championships
Gold medal – first place	2015 Plovdiv	Women's eight
Gold medal – first place	2016 Rotterdam	Women's eight

Colette Lucas-Conwell is an American coxswain. At the 2023 Pan American Games, Lucas-Conwell won gold as the coxswain for the United States mixed eight and silver for the women's eight. She is the first female athlete invited to a men's Olympic rowing selection camp in U.S. rowing history.

== Early life and education ==
Lucas-Conwell was born in Paris to Susan and Frederic Lucas-Conwell. She has a fraternal twin and two older sisters. Her family moved to Palo Alto, California when she was 10. She holds dual citizenship in the United States and France. After graduating from Palo Alto High School, she attended the University of Virginia, receiving a Bachelor of Arts in Economics in 2017 and Minor in Leadership in the McIntyre School of Commerce.

== Career ==
=== Youth career ===
Lucas-Conwell started coxing in 8th grade at NorCal Crew in Redwood City. She competed in the USRowing Youth Club National Championships in 2011 finishing second in the men’s junior B eight with Southeast Juniors. She transferred to Los Gatos Rowing Club her senior year and got fourth in the women's lightweight eight at the USRowing Youth National Championships in 2013.

=== Collegiate career ===
While attending the University of Virginia, Lucas-Conwell competed for the school's Division I women's rowing team. In 2014, she won gold in the college division of the Womens Championship Eight at the Head of the Charles Regatta. In 2015, she was a Collegiate Rowing Coaches Association (CRCA) Second-Team All-American and CRCA All-Region 3 first team member. That year, she finished third in the varsity eight at the NCAA Women’s Rowing Championships and was the coxswain for the ACC champion varsity eight that was named ACC Crew of the Year. The following year, she was a CRCA All-Region first team member and was nominated to the All-Atlantic Coast Conference first-team. Lucas-Conwell won the varsity eight at the Atlantic Coast Conference Championships and competed at the NCAA Division 1 Championships in the women's varsity eight in 2015, 2016, and 2017.

=== National and international career ===
Lucas-Conwell won gold with the U.S. in the Women’s Eight at the 2015 and 2016 World Rowing U23 Championships.

She has competed at the Head of the Charles Regatta ten times (2011, 2013–2019, 2021–2022) including three times with the United States Senior National Team (2018, 2019, 2021). Shortly after graduating she won gold in the Womens Alumni Eight (2017) with UVA, where she also set a course record. She competed in the Men's Championship Eight for the first time in 2018 and won the event the following year in 2019. She finished second in the Men's Championship Four in 2021, then competed with Marin Rowing Association in the Men's Senior Masters Eight in 2022 where she placed second.

In 2018, she competed at the Heineken Roeivierkamp, where she won the Men’s Masters Eight D age category with a composite crew of former International Olympians representing Cambridge Boat Club. She came back to win the Men's Masters Eight E category in 2022 with a similar crew.

In 2022, Lucas-Conwell competed with the mens US Rowing Senior National Team in the Grand Challenge Cup at the Henley Royal Regatta where she was a semi-finallist.

Lucas-Conwell won gold as the coxswain for the United States mixed eight at the 2023 Pan American Games, the first time the event was ever contested on the world stage. She also helped the United States' first women’s eight team secure a silver medal in Chile.

=== Other ===
Lucas-Conwell works in the Office of the President for the Oakland Athletics. She is on the board of Civicorps and East Bay Rowing Club.

== Personal life ==
In 2023, Lucas-Conwell completed the Napa Valley Marathon.
