= Rowing at the 2023 Pan American Games – Men's coxless pair =

Men's coxless pair at the 2023 Pan American Games
- Venue: Laguna Grande
- Dates: October 21 – October 23
- Competitors: 24 from 12 nations
- Winning time: 6:35.16

Medalists
| Gold medal | Alexander Hedge; Ezra Carlson | United States |
| Silver medal | Esteban Sosa; Leandro Rodas | Uruguay |
| Bronze medal | Hugo Reyes; Jordy Gutierrez | Mexico |

The men's coxless pair competition of the rowing events at the 2023 Pan American Games was held from October 21 to 23 at Laguna Grande in San Pedro de la Paz, Chile.

== Schedule ==
| Date | Time | Round |
|---|---|---|
| October 21, 2023 | 8:20 | Heat 1 |
| October 21, 2023 | 8:30 | Heat 2 |
| October 22, 2023 | 9:10 | Repechage 1 |
| October 22, 2023 | 9:20 | Repechage 2 |
| October 23, 2023 | 8:30 | Final B |
| October 23, 2023 | 8:50 | Final A |

== Results ==
=== Heats ===
==== Heat 1 ====
| Rank | Rowers | Country | Time | Notes |
|---|---|---|---|---|
| 1 | Ignacio Pacheco; Joel Romero | Argentina | 6:59:86 | FA |
| 2 | Alef Da Rosa; Bernardo Timm | Brazil | 7:04:67 | R |
| 3 | Henry Heredia; Luis León | Cuba | 7:06:09 | R |
| 4 | Matías Ramírez; Gustavo Avalos | Paraguay | 7:23:49 | R |
| 5 | Lisardo Diaz; Alfredo Esquea | Dominican Republic | 7:45:34 | R |
| 6 | Walter González; Michael Hernandez | Nicaragua | 7:55:27 | R |

==== Heat 2 ====
| Rank | Rowers | Country | Time | Notes |
|---|---|---|---|---|
| 1 | Alexander Hedge; Ezra Carlson | United States | 6:55:19 | FA |
| 2 | Nahuel Reyes; Marcelo Poo | Chile | 7:01:64 | R |
| 3 | Hugo Reyes; Jordy Gutierrez | Mexico | 7:03:07 | R |
| 4 | Esteban Sosa; Leandro Rodas | Uruguay | 7:08:07 | R |
| 5 | Quinn Storey; Connor Attridge | Canada | 7:19:14 | R |
| 6 | Alberto Limonta; Gianfranco Coletti | Peru | 7:43:68 | R |

=== Repechage 1 ===
| Rank | Rowers | Country | Time | Notes |
|---|---|---|---|---|
| 1 | Hugo Reyes; Jordy Gutierrez | Mexico | 6:46.70 | FA |
| 2 | Alef Da Rosa; Bernardo Timm | Brazil | 6:50.35 | FA |
| 3 | Quinn Storey; Connor Attridge | Canada | 6:55.44 | FB |
| 4 | Matías Ramírez; Gustavo Avalos | Paraguay | 7:06.19 | FB |
| 5 | Walter González; Michael Hernandez | Nicaragua | 7:42.77 | FB |

=== Repechage 2 ===
| Rank | Rowers | Country | Time | Notes |
|---|---|---|---|---|
| 1 | Esteban Sosa; Leandro Rodas | Uruguay | 6:49.91 | FA |
| 2 | Nahuel Reyes; Marcelo Poo | Chile | 6:53.51 | FA |
| 3 | Henry Heredia; Luis León | Cuba | 6:56.91 | FB |
| 4 | Alberto Limonta; Gianfranco Coletti | Peru | 7:24.87 | FB |
| 5 | Lisardo Diaz; Alfredo Esquea | Dominican Republic | 7:32.27 | FB |

=== Final B ===
| Rank | Rowers | Country | Time | Notes |
|---|---|---|---|---|
| 7 | Quinn Storey; Connor Attridge | Canada | 6:59.13 | |
| 8 | Matías Ramírez; Gustavo Avalos | Paraguay | 7:04.27 | |
| 9 | Alberto Limonta; Gianfranco Coletti | Peru | 7:19.53 | |
| 10 | Lisardo Diaz; Alfredo Esquea | Dominican Republic | 7:25.67 | |
| 11 | Walter González; Michael Hernandez | Nicaragua | 7:32.64 | |
| 12 | Henry Heredia; Luis León | Cuba | DNS | |

=== Final A ===
| Rank | Rowers | Country | Time | Notes |
|---|---|---|---|---|
| 1st place, gold medalist(s) | Alexander Hedge; Ezra Carlson | United States | 6:35.16 | |
| 2nd place, silver medalist(s) | Esteban Sosa; Leandro Rodas | Uruguay | 6:38.82 | |
| 3rd place, bronze medalist(s) | Hugo Reyes; Jordy Gutierrez | Mexico | 6:38.98 | |
| 4 | Nahuel Reyes; Marcelo Poo | Chile | 6:41.70 | |
| 5 | Ignacio Pacheco; Joel Romero | Argentina | 6:44.77 | |
| 6 | Alef Da Rosa; Bernardo Timm | Brazil | 6:46.17 | |
