= 2025 World Rowing Championships – Men's lightweight single sculls =

Men's lightweight single sculls at the 2025 World Rowing Championships
- Venue: Dianshan Lake
- Location: Shanghai, China
- Dates: 23–27 September
- Competitors: 16 from 16 nations
- Winning time: 6:54.10

Medalists
gold medal	Felipe Klüver	Uruguay
silver medal	Julian Schöberl	Austria
bronze medal	Jacob McCarthy	Ireland

The men's lightweight single sculls competition at the 2025 World Rowing Championships took place at Dianshan Lake, in Shanghai.

== Schedule ==
The schedule was as follows:

Date	Time	Round
Tuesday 23 September 2025	10:23	Heats
Thursday, 25 September 2025	10:43	Semifinals
Thursday, 25 September 2025	11:26	Final C
Saturday, 27 September 2025	13:33	Final B
Saturday, 27 September 2025	14:50	Final A

All times are UTC+08:00

== Results ==
=== Heats ===
The two fastest boats in each heat and the six fastest times advanced to the semifinals. The remaining boats were sent to the Final C.

==== Heat 1 ====
Rank	Rower	Country	Time	Notes
1	Felipe Klüver	Uruguay	7:05.58	SF
2	Alexis López	Mexico	7:11.79	SF
3	Shakhzod Nurmatov	Uzbekistan	7:13.15	SF
4	Mohammed Al-Khafaji	Iraq	7:20.30	FC
5	Lee Jong-hee	South Korea	7:21.27	FC
6	Bin Ahmad Faiz Zuhairee	Malaysia	7:57.41	FC

==== Heat 2 ====
Rank	Rower	Country	Time	Notes
1	Julian Schöberl	Austria	6:54.46	SF
2	Gu Jiantao	China	6:56.43	SF
3	Jacob McCarthy	Ireland	6:56.65	SF
4	Chiu Hin Chun	Hong Kong	7:00.39	SF
5	Kasper Hirvilampi	Finland	7:33.85	FC

==== Heat 3 ====
Rank	Rower	Country	Time	Notes
1	Halil Kaan Köroğlu	Turkey	7:01.04	SF
2	Fabio Kress	Germany	7:05.41	SF
3	Justin Schmidt	United States	7:10.51	SF
4	Artem Matussevich	Kazakhstan	7:13.33	SF
5	Ghaith Kadri	Tunisia	7:13.95	SF

=== Semifinals ===
The three fastest boats in each heat advance to the Final A. The remaining boats were sent to the Final B.

==== Semifinal 1 ====
Rank	Rower	Country	Time	Notes
1	Julian Schöberl	Austria	7:22.09	FA
2	Fabio Kress	Germany	7:25.00	FA
3	Gu Jiantao	China	7:27.72	FA
4	Justin Schmidt	United States	7:31.24	FB
5	Chiu Hin Chun	Hong Kong	7:43.10	FB
6	Ghaith Kadri	Tunisia	7:53.03	FB

==== Semifinal 2 ====
Rank	Rower	Country	Time	Notes
1	Felipe Klüver	Uruguay	7:28.40	FA
2	Halil Kaan Köroğlu	Turkey	7:31.12	FA
3	Jacob McCarthy	Ireland	7:33.01	FA
4	Shakhzod Nurmatov	Uzbekistan	7:33.29	FB
5	Alexis López	Mexico	7:48.66	FB
6	Artem Matussevich	Kazakhstan	7:49.34	FB

=== Finals ===
The A final determined the rankings for places 1 to 6. Additional rankings were determined in the other finals.

==== Final C ====
Rank	Rower	Country	Time	Total rank
1	Mohammed Al-Khafaji	Iraq	7:53.93	13
2	Lee Jong-hee	South Korea	7:58.41	14
3	Kasper Hirvilampi	Finland	8:15.21	15
4	Bin Ahmad Faiz Zuhairee	Malaysia	8:35.73	16

==== Final B ====
Rank	Rower	Country	Time	Total rank
1	Chiu Hin Chun	Hong Kong	7:07.33	7
2	Shakhzod Nurmatov	Uzbekistan	7:09.98	8
3	Artem Matussevich	Kazakhstan	7:10.96	9
4	Justin Schmidt	United States	7:11.72	10
5	Ghaith Kadri	Tunisia	7:16.27	11
6	Alexis López	Mexico	7:28.86	12

==== Final A ====
Rank	Rower	Country	Time	Notes
1st place, gold medalist(s)	Felipe Klüver	Uruguay	6:54.10	
2nd place, silver medalist(s)	Julian Schöberl	Austria	6:57.85	
3rd place, bronze medalist(s)	Jacob McCarthy	Ireland	6:59.07	
4	Fabio Kress	Germany	7:03.28	
5	Gu Jiantao	China	7:09.63	
6	Halil Kaan Köroğlu	Turkey	7:16.23	
