= Rowing at the 2023 Pan American Games – Men's quadruple sculls =

Men's quadruple sculls at the 2023 Pan American Games
- Venue: Laguna Grande
- Dates: October 23
- Competitors: 24 from 6 nations
- Winning time: 5:53.34

Medalists
Gold medal	Bruno Cetraro; Marcos Sarraute; Felipe Klüver; Leandro Salvagno	Uruguay
Silver medal	Francisco Lapostol; Brahim Alvayay; Óscar Vásquez; Andoni Habash	Chile
Bronze medal	Ricardo de la Rosa; Tomás Manzanillo; Andre Simsch; Rafael Mejía	Mexico

The men's quadruple sculls competition of the rowing events at the 2023 Pan American Games was held on October 23 at Laguna Grande in San Pedro de la Paz, Chile.

== Schedule ==
Date	Time	Round
October 23, 2023	9:00	Final

== Results ==
=== Final ===
The results were as follows:

Rank	Rowers	Country	Time	Notes
1st place, gold medalist(s)	Bruno Cetraro; Marcos Sarraute; Felipe Klüver; Leandro Salvagno	Uruguay	5:53.34	
2nd place, silver medalist(s)	Francisco Lapostol; Brahim Alvayay; Óscar Vásquez; Andoni Habash	Chile	5:56.65	
3rd place, bronze medalist(s)	Ricardo de la Rosa; Tomás Manzanillo; Andre Simsch; Rafael Mejía	Mexico	6:00.99	
4	Cooper Hurley; Luke Rein; Mark Couwenhoven; Casey Fuller	United States	6:01.36	
5	Emiliano Calderón; Martín Mansilla; Joaquín Riveros; Santiago Deandrea	Argentina	6:48.37	
6	Roberto Paz; Leduar Suárez; Carlos Ajete; Reidy Cardona	Cuba	7:23.03	
