= Rowing at the 2026 Central American and Caribbean Games =

- Venue: Centro de Remo y Canotaje Presa de Rincón
- Location: Santo Domingo, Dominican Republic
- Dates: 25–29 July

The rowing competition at the 2026 Central American and Caribbean Games was held at the Centro de Remo y Canotaje Presa de Rincón in Santo Domingo, Dominican Republic, from 25 to 29 July 2026.

== Participating nations ==
A total of 10 nations qualified athletes. The number of athletes a nation entered is in parentheses beside the name of the country.

- Barbados (1)
- Cuba (11)
- Dominican Republic (11)
- El Salvador (11)
- Guatemala (9)
- Honduras (2)
- Mexico (14)
- Nicaragua (3)
- Puerto Rico (1)
- Venezuela (14)

== Medal table ==
* Host nation (Dominican Republic)

Rank	Nation	Gold	Silver	Bronze	Total
1	Mexico (MEX)	9	3	3	15
2	Cuba (CUB)	4	6	2	12
3	Venezuela (VEN)	2	3	7	12
4	Dominican Republic (DOM)*	0	3	1	4
5	Guatemala (GUA)	0	0	2	2
Totals (5 entries)		15	15	15	45

== Medal summary ==
=== Men's events ===
Event	Gold	Silver	Bronze
Single sculls	Alexis López; Mexico	Ignacio Vásquez; Dominican Republic	Leduar Suárez; Cuba
Double sculls	Cuba; Leduar Suárez; Reidy Cardona	Mexico; Alexis López; André Simsch	Venezuela; José Guipe; César Amaris
Lightweight double sculls	Venezuela; José Guipe; César Amaris	Dominican Republic; Carlos Rodríguez; Ignacio Vásquez	Mexico; Rafael Mejía; Roberto Ahumada
Coxless pair	Venezuela; Jaime Machado; André Mora	Cuba; Reidy Cardona; Pedro González	Mexico; Hugo Reyes; Jordy Gutiérrez
Quadruple sculls	Cuba; Leduar Suárez; Roberto Paz; Henry Heredia; Reidy Cardona	Mexico; Alexis López; André Simsch; Roberto Ahumada; Miguel Carballo	Venezuela; José Guipe; Jakson Vicent; Jonas Díaz; César Amaris
Coxless four	Mexico; André Simsch; Hugo Reyes; Jordy Gutiérrez; Miguel Carballo	Cuba; Leduar Suárez; Roberto Paz; Henry Heredia; Reidy Cardona	Venezuela; Jakson Vicent; Nick Utrera; Jaime Machado; César Amaris

=== Women's events ===
Event	Gold	Silver	Bronze
Single sculls	Kenia Lechuga; Mexico	Loraidis Echavarría; Cuba	Kimberlin Meneses; Venezuela
Double sculls	Mexico; Melissa Márquez; Aylin Ibarra	Cuba; Rayma Ortiz; Loraidis Echavarría	Guatemala; Lesli González; Nicolle González
Lightweight double sculls	Mexico; Melissa Márquez; Aylin Ibarra	Venezuela; Keyla García; Kimberlin Meneses	Cuba; Ana Jimenez; Leah Almeida
Coxless pair	Cuba; Rayma Ortiz; Natalie Morales	Mexico; Maite Arrillaga; María García	Guatemala; Dulce Samayoa; Nicolle González
Quadruple sculls	Mexico; Melissa Márquez; Aylin Ibarra; Jennifer De La Rosa; Ximena Castellanos	Cuba; Rayma Ortiz; Ana Jiménez; Natalie Morales; Loraidis Echavarría	Venezuela; Zairet Rolls; Keyla García; Francis Chacín; Kimberlin Meneses
Coxless four	Mexico; Jennifer De La Rosa; Maite Arrillaga; María García; Ximena Castellanos	Cuba; Rayma Ortiz; Natalie Morales; Ana Jiménez; Loraidis Echavarría	Venezuela; Yendris Vásquez; Francis Chacín; Naomi Soazo; Milenca Hernández

=== Mixed events ===
Event	Gold	Silver	Bronze
Double sculls	Mexico; Kenia Lechuga; Alexis López	Dominican Republic; Ignacio Vásquez; Wendy Simo	Venezuela; André Mora; Keyla García
Coxless pair	Mexico; Rafael Mejía; Maite Arrillaga	Venezuela; Jaime Machado; Naomi Soazo	Dominican Republic; Jancarlos Tineo; Wendy Simo
Eight	Cuba; Henry Heredia; Rayma Ortiz; Pedro González; Juan González; Ana Jiménez; Leduar Suárez; Natalie Morales; Reidy Cardona; Loraidis Echavarría	Venezuela; Zairet Rolls; Jaime Machado; Yendris Vásquez; Keyla García; Francis Chacín; Jakson Vicent; André Mora; Naomi Soazo; Jonas Díaz	Mexico; Aylin Ibarra; Jennifer De La Rosa; André Simsch; Hugo Reyes; Jordy Gutiérrez; Maite Arrillaga; María García; Ximena Castellanos; Miguel Carballo
