= Lauren Miller =

Lauren Miller may refer to:

- Lauren Miller Rogen, née Miller, American actress, comedian, screenwriter, and director
- Lauren Miller (rower), American rower
