= Mark Couwenhoven =

American rower (born 1997)

Personal information
- Nationality: United States
- Born: January 28, 1997 (age 29)
- Height: 6 ft 5 in (196 cm)
- Weight: 180 lb (82 kg)

Sport
- Sport: Rowing
Medal record
Men's rowing
Representing United States
Pan American Games
Gold medal – first place	2023 Santiago	Mixed Eight
Bronze medal – third place	2023 Santiago	Double sculls

Mark Couwenhoven (born January 28, 1997) is an American rower. At the 2023 Pan American Games, he won gold as a member of the mixed eight competition.

== Early life and education ==
Born January 28, 1997, Couwenhoven was raised in Parkton, Maryland. He attended the University of Maryland, Baltimore County.

== Career ==
=== Collegiate career ===
Couwenhoven rowed with the University of Maryland, Baltimore County. In 2017, he won the lightweight eight at the Dad Vail Regatta. The next two years, he won the single sculls at the American Collegiate Rowing Association National Championships, as well as at the 2019 Dad Vail Regatta.

=== National and international career ===
In 2015, Couwenhoven competed at the Canadian Henley, where he won the under-19 single sculls. In 2019, he finished tenth in the double at the World Rowing U23 Championships. In 2023, he competed in the Pan American Games, finishing first in the mixed eight competition, third in the men's double, fourth in the men’s eight, and fourth in the men's quad.
