= Óscar Vásquez =

Chilean rower (born 1986)

Personal information
- Full name: Óscar Mauricio Vásquez Ochoa
- Born: 15 November 1986 (age 39) Valdivia, Chile

Sport
- Sport: Rowing
Medal record
Men's rowing
Representing Chile
Pan American Games
Gold medal – first place	2015 Toronto	Coxless pair
Silver medal – second place	2019 Lima	Eight
Silver medal – second place	2023 Santiago	Quadruple sculls
Silver medal – second place	2023 Santiago	Mixed eight
Bronze medal – third place	2023 Santiago	Eight

Óscar Vásquez (born 15 November 1986) is a Chilean rower who represents his country at international competitions. He competed at the 2004 Summer Olympics, 2008 Summer Olympics and the 2012 Summer Olympics.
