= Sailing at the 2023 Pan American Games – Snipe =

Snipe at the 2023 Pan American Games
- Venue: Cofradia Nautica del Pacifico
- Dates: October 30 - November 4
- Competitors: 16 from 8 nations

Medalists
| Gold medal | Julio Alsogaray; Malena Sciarra | Argentina |
| Silver medal | Ernesto Rodriguez; Kathleen Tocke | United States |
| Bronze medal | Rafael Martins; Juliana Duque | Brazil |

The Snipe competition of the sailing events at the 2023 Pan American Games in Santiago was held from October 30 to November 4 at the Cofradia Nautica del Pacifico.

Points were assigned based on the finishing position in each race (1 for first, 2 for second, etc.). The points were totaled from the top 9 results of the first 10 races, with lower totals being better. If a team was disqualified or did not complete the race, 9 points were assigned for that race (as there were 8 teams in this competition). The top 5 teams at that point competed in the final race, with placings counting double for final score. The team with the lowest total score won.

Julio Alsogaray and Malena Sciarra from Argentina won the gold medal after finishing second in the medal race. The podium was completed with Ernesto Rodriguez and Kathleen Tocke from the United States and Rafael Martins and Juliana Duque from Brazil.

== Schedule ==
All times are (UTC-3).

| Date | Time | Round |
|---|---|---|
| October 30, 2023 | 12:14 | Races 1, 2 and 3 |
| October 31, 2023 | 13:07 | Races 4, 5 and 6 |
| November 2, 2023 | 15:15 | Races 7 and 8 |
| November 3, 2023 | 13:07 | Races 9 and 10 |
| November 4, 2023 | 13:20 | Medal race |

== Results ==
The results were as below.
Race M is the medal race.

| Rank | Athlete | Nation | Race | | | | | | | | | | | Total Points | Net Points |
| Rank | Athlete | Nation | 1 | 2 | 3 | 4 | 5 | 6 | 7 | 8 | 9 | 10 | M | Total Points | Net Points |
|---|---|---|---|---|---|---|---|---|---|---|---|---|---|---|---|
| 1st place, gold medalist(s) | Julio Alsogaray; Malena Sciarra | Argentina | 1 | 1 | 4 | (5) | 4 | 2 | 2 | 3 | 2 | 3 | 4 | 31 | 26 |
| 2nd place, silver medalist(s) | Ernesto Rodriguez; Kathleen Tocke | United States | 2 | 4 | (9); OCS | 6 | 1 | 5 | 5 | 2 | 1 | 2 | 2 | 39 | 30 |
| 3rd place, bronze medalist(s) | Rafael Martins; Juliana Duque | Brazil | 4 | 3 | 3 | 4 | (6) | 3 | 3 | 1 | 3 | 1 | 10 | 41 | 35 |
| 4 | Pablo Defazio; Dominique Knuppel | Uruguay | 6 | 5 | 2 | 1 | 2 | (7) | 1 | 4 | 4 | 5 | 8 | 45 | 38 |
| 5 | Matías Seguel; Constanza Seguel | Chile | 5 | 2 | 1 | 7 | 3 | 1 | 4 | 5 | 7 | (9); DNF | 7 STP | 51 | 42 |
| 6 | Raúl de Choudens; Andrea Riefkohl | Puerto Rico | 7 | 7 | 6 | 2 | 7 | 4 | 6 | (8) | 5 | 4 | —N/a | 56 | 48 |
| 7 | Ismael Macchiavello; Alessia Valdez | Peru | 3 | 6 | 5 | (8) | 5 | 6 | 7 | 6 | 6 | 7 | —N/a | 59 | 51 |
| 8 | Nélido López; Sanlay de la Cruz | Cuba | (8) | 8 | 7 | 3 | 8 | 8 | 8 | 7 | 8 | 6 | —N/a | 71 | 63 |
