= James Plihal =

American rower (born 1996)

Personal information
- Born: June 19, 1996 (age 30)
- Height: 6 ft 10 in (208 cm)
- Weight: 218 lb (99 kg)

Sport
- Sport: Rowing
Medal record
Men's rowing
Representing United States
Pan American Games
Gold medal – first place	2023 Santiago	Mixed Eight
Silver medal – second place	2023 Santiago	Single sculls

James Jacob Plihal (/ˈpliːhɑːl/ PLEE-hall; born June 19, 1996) who is known by the nickname Plibob, is an American rower. At the 2023 Pan American Games, he won gold as a member of the mixed eight competition. He competed at the 2024 Summer Olympics in the men's single sculls.

== Early life and education ==
Plihal was born June 19, 1996. He graduated from Vashon Island High School in 2014, then from Northeastern University in 2018 with a degree in architectural studies.

== Career ==
=== Collegiate career ===
Plihal rowed competitively for Northeastern University. In 2015, he finished second in the varsity eight at the Eastern Sprints. He was nominated to the IRA All-American team three times and was named team captain in 2016.

=== National and international career ===
At the 2017 World Rowing U23 Championships, Plihal finished 14th in the quad sculls. He finished 18th at the same competition the following year. In 2020, he finished fourth in the double sculls at the U.S. Olympic Team Trials. In 2022, he finished ninth in the double sculls at the World Rowing Cup II. At the 2023 Pan American Games, Plihal won gold as a member of the mixed eight competition, and silver in the men's single sculls.

He competed at the 2024 Paris Summer Olympics in the men's single sculls, where he placed 13th. His final time (6:41) is an all time US record in the discipline.

== Personal life ==
As of 2023, Plihal lives and trains in Craftsbury, Vermont.
