= Grace Joyce =

American rower (born 1998)

Personal information
- Born: March 5, 1998 (age 28)
- Home town: Northfield, Illinois
- Education: University of Wisconsin
- Height: 5 ft 9 in (175 cm)

Sport
- Country: United States
- Sport: Rowing
Medal record
Women's rowing
Representing United States
Pan American Games
Gold medal – first place	2023 Santiago	Women's quadruple sculls
Silver medal – second place	2023 Santiago	Women's eight

Grace Joyce (born March 5, 1998) is an American rower who represented the United States at the 2024 Summer Olympics.

Grace Joyce was born on March 5, 1998, in Northfield, Illinois. She played soccer in her youth but began rowing after her sister started rowing and encouraged her to join the New Trier High School rowing team. She graduated from New Trier High School in 2016. From 2018 to 2019, she was part of the US national Under 23 rowing team. Joyce learned to scull at the Craftsbury Outdoor Center in the summer of her freshman year in college. She was a member of the women's rowing team at the University of Wisconsin–Madison, where she received the Freshman MVP Award in 2017 and Academic All-Big Ten honors in 2019. She set her goal to compete at the Olympics after an NCAA championship banquet in 2019. She graduated from college in 2020.

She won gold at the women's quadruple sculls event and won silver at the women's eight event at the 2023 Pan American Games. She also won the quadruple sculls at the 2024 World Rowing Final Olympic & Paralympic Qualification Regatta. In 2024, she competed in the women's quadruple scull event during the 2024 Summer Olympics held in Paris, where her team placed 9th overall.

Joyce is LGBTQ.
