= Karate at the 2023 Pan American Games – Men's 60 kg =

Men's 60 kg at the 2023 Pan American Games
- Venue: Contact Sports Center
- Dates: November 3
- Competitors: 9 from 9 nations

Medalists
Gold medal	Enrique Villalón	Chile
Silver medal	Brayan Díaz	Cuba
Bronze medal	Douglas Brose	Brazil
Bronze medal	Juan Fernández	Colombia

The men's 60 kg competition of the karate events at the 2023 Pan American Games was held on November 3 at the Contact Sports Center (Centro de Entrenamiento de los Deportes de Contacto) in Santiago, Chile.

== Schedule ==
Date	Time	Round
November 3, 2023	14:00	Pool matches
November 3, 2023	16:59	Semifinals
November 3, 2023	17:20	Final

== Results ==
The athletes with the two best scores of each pool advance to the semifinals.

=== Pool A ===
Rk	Athlete	Pld	W	L	Pts.
1	Douglas Brose (BRA)	3	3	0	9
2	Juan Fernández (COL)	3	2	1	6
3	Frank Ruiz (USA)	3	1	2	3
4	Pedro de la Roca (EAI)	3	0	3	0

	Score	
Douglas Brose (BRA)	3–0	Frank Ruiz (USA)
Juan Fernández (COL)	8–0	Pedro de la Roca (EAI)
Douglas Brose (BRA)	3–3	Juan Fernández (COL)
Frank Ruiz (USA)	4–0	Pedro de la Roca (EAI)
Frank Ruiz (USA)	0–3	Juan Fernández (COL)
Douglas Brose (BRA)	1–0	Pedro de la Roca (EAI)

=== Pool B ===
Rk	Athlete	Pld	W	L	Pts.
1	Enrique Villalón (CHI)	4	3	1	9
2	Brayan Díaz (CUB)	4	2	2	6
3	Joseph Tolentino (USA)	4	2	2	6
4	José Luque (MEX)	4	2	2	6
5	Daiver Larrosa (URU)	4	1	3	3

	Score	
Enrique Villalón (CHI)	3–2	Brayan Díaz (CUB)
Daiver Larrosa (URU)	3–6	José Luque (MEX)
Enrique Villalón (CHI)	2–1	Joseph Tolentino (USA)
Brayan Díaz (CUB)	4–4	Daiver Larrosa (URU)
Enrique Villalón (CHI)	0–1	José Luque (MEX)
Brayan Díaz (CUB)	1–0	Joseph Tolentino (USA)
Enrique Villalón (CHI)	3–2	Daiver Larrosa (URU)
Joseph Tolentino (USA)	3–1	José Luque (MEX)
Brayan Díaz (CUB)	2–1	José Luque (MEX)
Daiver Larrosa (URU)	2–3	Joseph Tolentino (USA)

=== Finals ===
The results were as follows:

Semifinals
Douglas Brose (BRA)	2
Brayan Díaz (CUB)	5
Enrique Villalón (CHI)	7
Juan Fernández (COL)	0

Gold medal match
Brayan Díaz (CUB)	5
Enrique Villalón (CHI)	6
