= Enrique Villalón =

Chilean karateka (born 2001)

Personal information
- Full name: Enrique Andrés Villalón Ruiz
- Born: 4 January 2001 (age 25) Osorno, Chile

Sport
- Country: Chile
- Sport: Karate
- Weight class: 60 kg
- Event: Kumite
- Now coaching: Ahmed Solyman
Medal record
Men's karate
Representing Chile
Pan American Games
Gold medal – first place	2023 Santiago	Kumite 60 kg
Bolivarian Games
Silver medal – second place	2025 Ayacucho-Lima	Kumite 60 kg
Bronze medal – third place	2025 Ayacucho-Lima	Kumite men's team

Enrique Andrés Villalón Ruiz (born 4 January 2001) is a Chilean karateka. He won the gold medal in the men's 60 kg event at the 2023 Pan American Games, held in Santiago, Chile, after defeating Cuba's Brayan Díaz in the final.

Born in Osorno, Chile, Villalón began practicing karate at six years old in his hometown, later moving to a dojo in Puerto Montt. Currently, he studies International relations at University of Chile.

He participated at the 2022 Bolivarian Games in Valledupar, Colombia. He later won the silver medal in the 60 kg event at the 2025 Bolivarian Games in Ayacucho and Lima, Peru, as well as the bronze medals in the men's team kumite event alongside Daniel Manríquez, Jorge Bravo and Sebastián Dodero.
