= Jake McCarthy (rower) =

Irish rower (born 1996)

Personal information
- Nationality: Irish
- Born: Jacob McCarthy; 23 November 1996 (age 29) Cork, Ireland

Sport
- Country: Ireland
- Sport: Rowing
Medal record
Men's rowing
Representing Ireland
World Championships
Bronze medal – third place	2025 Shanghai	LM1x

Jake McCarthy (born 23 November 1996) is an Irish rower. He was a bronze medalist in the lightweight single sculls at the 2025 World Rowing Championships.

== Biography ==
He is from Skibbereen, County Cork. McCarthy and twin brother Fintan McCarthy both compete in rowing. A member of Skibbereen Rowing Club, McCarthy won his first national title in rowing with his brother in 2016. The brothers qualified for the European Rowing Championships final in 2019.

After missing two years of competition with a back injury, McCarthy returned to racing and alongside Fintan and Jake, took silver in the directors’ challenge men's quads at the Head of the Charles regatta in Boston, Massachusetts in October 2024.

He won a place in the A final of the lightweight men's single sculls with a second-place finish in his heat at the 2025 European Rowing Championships in Plovdiv in May 2025, placing fourth in the final. He won the bronze medal at the 2025 World Rowing Championships in the lightweight single sculls competing in Shanghai, China, in September 2025.
