= Hannah Paynter =

American rower (born 1997)

Personal information
- Born: June 13, 1997 (age 29)

Sport
- Sport: Rowing
Medal record
Women's rowing
Representing United States
Pan American Games
Gold medal – first place	2023 Santiago	Coxless pair
Gold medal – first place	2023 Santiago	Mixed Eight
Silver medal – second place	2023 Santiago	Women's eight
Silver medal – second place	2023 Santiago	Women's four

Hannah Paynter (born June 13, 1997) is an American rower. She is a Pan American Games gold and silver medalist.

== Early life and career ==
Born on June 13, 1997, Paynter grew up in Lyme, Connecticut and attended Lyme-Old Lyme High School. She has two younger sisters and a younger brother.

She rowed for Princeton University. After college Paynter was named as an alternate on the 2022 US World Championship team.

Paynter competed at the 2023 Pan American Games where she won gold medals in the women's coxless pair and mixed eight events and silver medals in the women's four and women's eight events.
