= 2026 World Rowing Championships – Men's lightweight single sculls =

Men's lightweight single sculls at the 2026 World Rowing Championships
- Venue: Bosbaan
- Location: Amsterdam, Netherlands
- Dates: 24–27 August
- Competitors: 16 from 16 nations
- Winning time: 6:47.77

Medalists
gold medal	Petros Gkaidatzis	Greece
silver medal	Felipe Klüver	Uruguay
bronze medal	Alexis López	Mexico

The men's lightweight single sculls competition at the 2026 World Rowing Championships took place at Bosbaan, in Amsterdam.

== Schedule ==
The schedule was as follows:

Date	Time	Round
Monday 24 August 2026	17:22	Heats
Wednesday 26 August 2026	15:19	Final C
Wednesday 26 August 2026	17:15	Semifinals
Thursday, 27 August 2026	15:21	Final B
Thursday, 27 August 2026	17:41	Final A

All times are Central European Summer Time (UTC+2)

== Results ==
=== Heats ===
The two fastest boats in each heat and the six fastest times advanced to the semifinals. Other crews to Final C.

==== Heat 1 ====
Rank	Rower	Country	Time	Notes
1	Alexis López	Mexico	7:45.22	SF
2	Fabio Kress	Germany	7:45.72	SF
3	Ghaith Kadri	Tunisia	7:45.84	SF
4	Cornelus Palsma	Netherlands	7:55.37	SF
5	Ajay Tyagi	India	8:15.78	FC
6	Matías Ramírez	Paraguay	8:23.15	FC

==== Heat 2 ====
Rank	Rower	Country	Time	Notes
1	Petros Gkaidatzis	Greece	7:57.81	SF
2	Santino Menin	Argentina	8:03.67	SF
3	Juho-Pekka Petäjäniemi	Finland	8:11.29	SF
4	Mohamed Kota	Egypt	8:11.68	SF
5	Justin Schmidt	United States	8:11.79	SF

==== Heat 3 ====
Rank	Rower	Country	Time	Notes
1	Felipe Klüver	Uruguay	7:53.77	SF
2	Konrad Hultsch	Austria	7:55.55	SF
3	Mikita Karneyeu	Individual Neutral Athletes 1	7:58.08	SF
4	Bence Tamás	Hungary	8:14.45	FC
5	César Cipriani	Peru	8:35.69	FC

=== Semifinals ===
The three fastest boats in each heat advance to the Final A. The remaining boats were sent to the Final B.

==== Semifinal 1 ====
Rank	Rower	Country	Time	Notes
1	Petros Gkaidatzis	Greece	7:22.29	FA
2	Alexis López	Mexico	7:25.70	FA
3	Justin Schmidt	United States	7:26.83	FA
4	Konrad Hultsch	Austria	7:30.39	FB
5	Cornelus Palsma	Netherlands	7:30.93	FB
6	Juho-Pekka Petäjäniemi	Finland	7:44.71	FB

==== Semifinal 2 ====
Rank	Rower	Country	Time	Notes
1	Fabio Kress	Germany	7:24.32	FA
2	Mikita Karneyeu	Individual Neutral Athletes 1	7:25.90	FA
3	Felipe Klüver	Uruguay	7:26.49	FA
4	Santino Menin	Argentina	7:27.46	FB
5	Ghaith Kadri	Tunisia	7:56.57	FB
6	Mohamed Kota	Egypt	8:14.39	FB

=== Finals ===
The A final determined the rankings for places 1 to 6. Additional rankings were determined in the other finals.

==== Final C ====
Rank	Rower	Country	Time	Total rank
1	Ajay Tyagi	India	7:37.90	13
2	Matías Ramírez	Paraguay	7:40.88	14
3	Bence Tamás	Hungary	7:41.47	15
4	César Cipriani	Peru	7:53.13	16

==== Final B ====
Rank	Rower	Country	Time	Total rank
1	Santino Menin	Argentina	7:36.02	7
2	Konrad Hultsch	Austria	7:36.95	8
3	Ghaith Kadri	Tunisia	7:37.81	9
4	Mohamed Kota	Egypt	7:38.01	10
5	Cornelus Palsma	Netherlands	7:43.00	11
6	Juho-Pekka Petäjäniemi	Finland	7:47.86	12

==== Final A ====
Rank	Rower	Country	Time
1st place, gold medalist(s)	Petros Gkaidatzis	Greece	6:47.77
2nd place, silver medalist(s)	Felipe Klüver	Uruguay	6:51.50
3rd place, bronze medalist(s)	Alexis López	Mexico	6:52.06
4	Fabio Kress	Germany	6:52.62
5	Justin Schmidt	United States	7:04.20
6	Mikita Karneyeu	Individual Neutral Athletes 1	7:07.92
