= 2026 World Rowing Championships – Women's lightweight double sculls =

Women's lightweight double sculls at the 2026 World Rowing Championships
- Venue: Bosbaan
- Location: Amsterdam, Netherlands
- Dates: 25–27 August
- Competitors: 12 from 6 nations
- Winning time: 7:10.02

Medalists
gold medal	Aylin Maryah Ibarra Madueña; Melissa Márquez	Mexico
silver medal	Paschalina Mouratidou; Gavriela Lioliou	Greece
bronze medal	Khadija Krimi; Selma Dhaouadi	Tunisia

The women's lightweight double sculls competition at the 2026 World Rowing Championships took place at Bosbaan, in Amsterdam.

== Schedule ==
The schedule was as follows:

Date	Time	Round
Tuesday, 25 August 2026	15:46	Preliminary race
Thursday, 27 August 2026	17:26	Final

All times are Central European Summer Time (UTC+2)

== Results ==
=== Preliminary round ===
All boats advanced to the final.

Rank	Rower	Country	Time	Notes
1	Khadija Krimi; Selma Dhaouadi	Tunisia	8:13.51	F
2	Paschalina Mouratidou; Gavriela Lioliou	Greece	8:17.75	F
3	Chloé Gorski Delazeri; Isabelle Falck Camargos	Brazil	8:22.83	F
4	Aylin Maryah Ibarra Madueña; Melissa Márquez	Mexico	8:26.62	F
5	Adriana Sanabria; Rocío Bordón	Paraguay	8:36.38	F
6	Alessia Palacios; Valeria Palacios	Peru	8:49.26	F

=== Final ===
The A final determined the rankings for places 1 to 6.

Rank	Rower	Country	Time
1st place, gold medalist(s)	Aylin Maryah Ibarra Madueña; Melissa Márquez	Mexico	7:10.02
2nd place, silver medalist(s)	Paschalina Mouratidou; Gavriela Lioliou	Greece	7:12.05
3rd place, bronze medalist(s)	Khadija Krimi; Selma Dhaouadi	Tunisia	7:14.90
4	Alessia Palacios; Valeria Palacios	Peru	7:19.13
5	Chloé Gorski Delazeri; Isabelle Falck Camargos	Brazil	7:23.33
6	Adriana Sanabria; Rocío Bordón	Paraguay	7:39.56
