= Kristen Kit =

Canadian rower and cyclist (born 1988)

Personal information
- Full name: Kristen Kit
- Born: August 18, 1988 (age 38) St. Catharines, Ontario, Canada
- Height: 163 cm (5 ft 4 in)
- Weight: 55 kg (121 lb)
- Cycling career
- Sport: Cycling
- Discipline: Road
- Role: Rider

Amateur team
- 2019: InstaFund La Prima

Professional team
- 2020: InstaFund La Prima

Sport
- Country: Canada
- Sport: Rowing (sport); Road bicycle racing
- Club: University of British Columbia Rowing Club
- Coached by: Michelle Darvill
Medal record
Representing Canada
Women's rowing
Olympic Games
Gold medal – first place	2020 Tokyo	Eight
Silver medal – second place	2024 Paris	Eight
World Championships
Silver medal – second place	2017 Sarasota	Eight
Silver medal – second place	2018 Plovdiv	Eight
Bronze medal – third place	2013 Chungju	Eight
Bronze medal – third place	2022 Račice	Eight
World U23 Championships
Bronze medal – third place	2010 Brest	Eight
Pan American Games
Gold medal – first place	2023 Santiago	Eight
Pararowing
Paralympic Games
Bronze medal – third place	2016 Rio de Janeiro	LTA mixed coxed four
World Championships
Bronze medal – third place	2015 Aiguebelette-le-lac	LTA mixed coxed four

Kristen Kit (born August 18, 1988) is a Canadian multi-sports athlete, who competes as a coxswain in both women's eights and mixed coxed four rowing events, and who most recently rode for UCI Women's Continental Team InstaFund La Prima in road bicycle racing.

In rowing, Kit competes in international events where she has won six medals in eights and coxed fours. She represented Canada at the 2020 Summer Olympics as the coxwain of the women's eight boat. At the Olympics, the boat won the gold medal, Canada's first in the event since 1992.
