= Felipe Klüver =

Uruguayan rower (born 2000)

Personal information
- Full name: Felipe Klüver Ferreira
- Born: 7 June 2000 (age 26) Mercedes, Uruguay

Sport
- Sport: Rowing
Medal record
Men's rowing
Representing Uruguay
World Championships
| Gold medal – first place | 2025 Shanghai | Lwt single sculls |
| Silver medal – second place | 2026 Amsterdam | Lwt double sculls |
Pan American Games
| Gold medal – first place | 2023 Santiago | Quadruple sculls |
| Silver medal – second place | 2023 Santiago | Eight |

Felipe Klüver Ferreira (born 7 June 2000) is a Uruguayan rower.

Klüver started rowing at age 15 at Club de Remeros Mercedes. He is a graduate of the Mercedes Technical School. He won Uruguay its first world championship medal, a bronze in single lightweight. Together with Bruno Cetraro, he took part in the 2020 Summer Olympics, where they were finalists. He won in the under-23 lightweight class at the 2021 World Rowing Indoor Championship. In Cali, Colombia, at the 2021 Junior Pan American Games, he won gold medals in three competitions (M2x, M4x, M4–). He was the standard bearer for Uruguay in that event and at the 2022 South American Games in Asunción, Paraguay. He was under-23 single lightweight world champion in Varese, Italy, 2022.
