= Abigail Dent =

Canadian rower (born 2002)

Abby Dent
Personal information
- Full name: Abigail Dent
- Born: March 4, 2002 (age 24) Kenora, Ontario
- Height: 6 ft 1 in (185 cm)

Sport
- College team: Michigan
Medal record
Women's rowing
Representing Canada
Olympic Games
Silver medal – second place	2024 Paris	Eight
Pan American Games
Gold medal – first place	2023 Santiago	Eight
Silver medal – second place	2023 Santiago	Coxless pair

Abigail Dent (born March 4, 2002) is a national team rower from Canada. Dent became a Pan American Games champion when she won gold in the women's eight at the 2023 Pan Am Games in Santiago and also won a silver medal at the games in the coxless pair with Olivia McMurray.

== Early life and education ==
Dent was born March 4, 2002, to Leanne and Carlton Dent and grew up in Kenora. She attended Saint Thomas Aquinas High School, where she competed for the school's rowing team. There, she was named the junior women's athlete of the year (2017) and senior women's athlete of the year (2018).

While in high school, Dent also competed with the Kenora Rowing Club and the Manitoba Rowing Club. In 2017, she competed for Team Manitoba in the 2017 Canada Summer Games, winning bronze in the women's quad sculls. The next year, she won gold in both the junior women's single scull and in the women's U19 double at the 2018 Royal Canadian Henley Regatta.

After graduating high school, Dent attended the University of Michigan, where she majored in general studies through the College of Literature, Science, and the Arts. She was twice named an Academic All-Big Ten (2022, 2023).

== College career ==
While attending the University of Michigan, Dent competed with the university's rowing team. Her freshman year, she helped the team secure fourth place at the National Collegiate Athletic Association (NCAA) Championships. Her junior year, she was a member of the crew named Big Ten Boat of the Week for the week of April 11. The following month, she won gold and helped the team win the Big Ten Championship. She also placed ninth overall that year at the NCAA Championships. In 2023, she was named Big Ten Athlete of the Year and was on the All-Big Ten first team.

== International career ==
Dent competed on behalf of Canada at the 2019 World Rowing Junior Championships in Tokyo, Japan, where she finished sixth overall in the single sculls.

In 2021 and 2022, Dent was included on Team Canada's U-23 World Championship roster for double sculls and the 8+. In 2021, she finished twelfth in the double and seventh in the 8+.

At the 2023 U23 World Championships, she competed in the Women's Four event, where she finished 5th. She also competed at the 2023 World Cup III regatta, finishing 10th in the Women's Four.

In September 2023, Dent was named to the Canadian Pan American Games Team, in the Women's Eight, Women's Pair and Mixed Eight events. She placed 4th in the Mixed Eight, won a Silver Medal in the Women's Pair, and became the first-ever Pan American Games champion in the Women's Eight (2023 was the first time the Women's Eight had been contested at the Pan American Games).
