= Ezra Carlson =

American rower (born 1994)

Personal information
- Born: April 28, 1994 (age 32)
- Height: 6 ft 2 in (188 cm)

Sport
- Sport: Rowing
Medal record
Men's rowing
Representing United States
Pan American Games
Gold medal – first place	2023 Santiago	Coxless pair
Gold medal – first place	2023 Santiago	Mixed Eight

Ezra Carlson (born April 28, 1994) is an American rower who has represented the United States in international competitions. Carlson became a Pan American Games champion when he won gold in the Men's Coxless Pair the 2023 Pan Am Games in Santiago. Carlson was a member of the mixed eight that also won gold the 2023 Pan Am Games.

== Biography ==
Ezra rowed at the 2023 World Rowing Championships in Belgrade and finished 6th in the Men's eight.
