= Cristina Pretto =

American female rower

Personal information
- Nationality: American
- Education: Trinity College
- Height: 5 ft 11 in (180 cm)
- Weight: 175 lb (79 kg)

Sport
- Sport: Rowing
Medal record
Women's rowing
Representing United States
Pan American Games
Gold medal – first place	2023 Santiago	Mixed Eight
Silver medal – second place	2023 Santiago	Women's eight
Silver medal – second place	2023 Santiago	Women's four

Cristina Pretto is an American rower. She became a Pan American Games champion when she won gold in the mixed eight at the 2023 Pan American Games.

== Early life and education ==
Pretto was raised by John and Barbara Pretto in Prospect, Connecticut. Her mother immigrated to the United States from the Philippines, and her brother, Jack Alessio, swam competitively for Harvard University.

After graduating from high school, Pretto started university at College of the Holy Cross. However, after a concussion, she started training in rowing. She transferred to Trinity College in 2013, graduating in 2016 with a major in literature and minor in environmental science and gender studies.

== Career ==
=== Collegiate career ===
Pretto rowed for Trinity College. She won the Division III second varsity eight at the NCAA Women's Rowing Championships in 2014 and the Division III varsity eight in 2015.

=== National and international career ===
Pretto has competed with USRowing for the women's four, women's eight, and mixed eight. In 2023, she competed at the Pan American Games, where she won the gold in the mixed eight, as well as silver in the women's quad and eight.
