= Isa Darvin =

American rower

Isabela Darvin
Sport
- Sport: Rowing
Medal record
Women's rowing
Representing United States
Pan American Games
Gold medal – first place	2023 Santiago	Coxless pair
Gold medal – first place	2023 Santiago	Mixed Eight
Silver medal – second place	2023 Santiago	Women's eight
Silver medal – second place	2023 Santiago	Women's four

Isabela Darvin is an American rower. Darvin was a Pan American Games champion when she won gold in the Women's Coxless Pair at the 2023 Pan American Games in Santiago. Darvin was also a member of the mixed eight that also won gold at the 2023 Pan American Games.

Darvin rowed for the University of Wisconsin.
