= Heineken Roeivierkamp =

International rowing tournament

The 'men 8' are getting ready for the start of the Roeivierkamp on the Amstel at the New Amstel Bridge

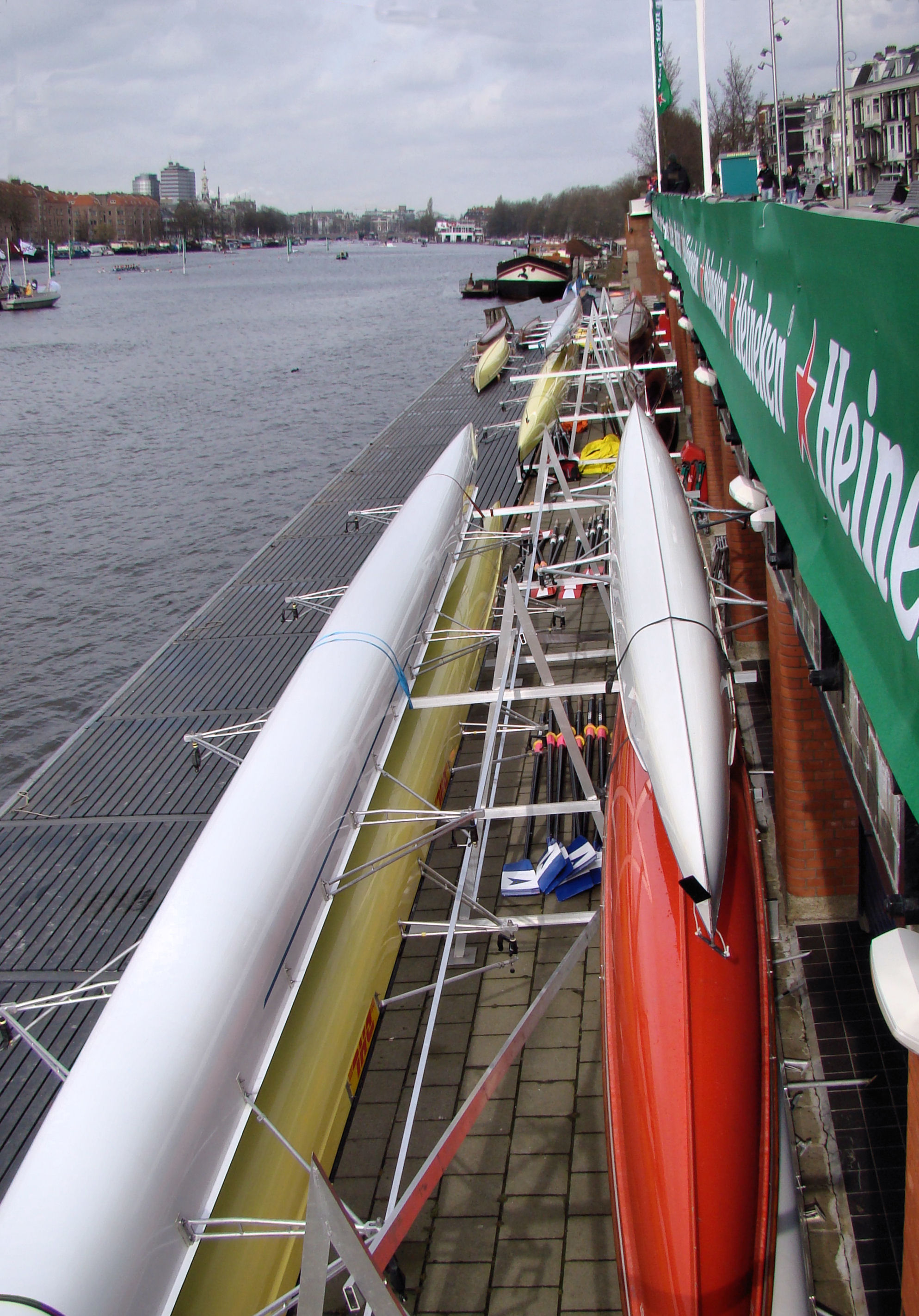
Rowing center Berlagebrug on the Weesperzijde (opposite ASR Nereus) is one of the main bases during the Roeivierkamp Amsterdam

The Heineken Roeivierkamp ('H4K') is an international rowing tournament that is held annually on the Amstel in Amsterdam in the second or third weekend of March. In two days four races are rowed, a day a long one and a short distance.

The Roeivierkamp has been organized by the Amsterdam Student Rowing Association Nereus since 1973 and is an official FISA competition. The matches are open for 'eights' (boats with eight rowers) and for 'quads' (four rowers, each two oars). It is a big event with (in 2013) around 3500 participants from various age categories and countries. All rowing clubs along the Amstel will open their grounds and club houses for visiting teams and a large team of volunteers will participate.

There are four distances to row: 250 meters, 750 meters, 2500 meters and 5000 meters. The final score is determined by calculating the results back to a 250-meter time and adding to each other (comparable to the all-round classification in speed skating races). A team that is bad at a short distance, therefore, has to make up a lot on the long distance.

On Saturday, the 2500 and 250 meters are rowed immediately after each other, on Sunday the teams row the 750 meters in the morning and the 5000 meters in the afternoon. The start of the short distances is at the Nieuwe Amstel bridge (between Ceintuurbaan and Ruyschstraat), where two teams are rowing together in the direction of Ouderkerk. The start of the long distances is at the Rozenoordbrug (2500 m) and the Grote Bocht (5000 m) respectively, here the teams start shortly after each other in the direction of Amsterdam. The finish of all distances is for the clubhouse of Nereus at the Amsteldijk at the Berlagebrug in Amsterdam.

The teams can be recognized by their clothing and the blades of the oars. National rowers wear their Dutch shirt under the club jersey, white with an orange band on the arm. Traditionally, the supporters cycle with their team on long distances and encourage them loudly with special slogans. It is good practice that other road users give the cycling fans priority.

The categories in which can be rowed at this tournament:

Men, Light Men and Women 1st division 8+ (Senior A), 2nd division 8+ (Transition), 3rd division 8+ (Novices) and 4th division 8+ (Beginning / first year) Ladies Seniors A 4x + Juniors Boys 8+ and 4x + Juniors Girls 4x + Other categories (such as veterans, clubs, boys / girls 16) can also participate in the competition, but do so over 3 distances. The 750 meters, seen as the hardest distance, is skipped by these teams.

== Radio H4K ==
Every year during the Heineken Roeivierkamp live report is done by the "Razende Reporters" that can be listened to via both the Internet and a temporary FM frequency. In addition to the live competition report, there is also an evening to listen to various interviews and the races of the past day are analyzed.
