= Alexander Hedge =

American rower (born 1997)

Personal information
- Born: May 11, 1997 (age 29) Boston, United States
- Height: 6 ft 6 in (1.98 m)

Sport
- Sport: Rowing
Medal record
Men's rowing
Representing United States
World Championships
Bronze medal – third place	2025 Shanghai	Eight
Pan American Games
Gold medal – first place	2023 Santiago	Coxless pair
Gold medal – first place	2023 Santiago	Mixed Eight

Alexander Hedge (born May 11, 1997) is an American rower who has represented the United States in international competitions. Hedge became a Pan American Games champion when he won gold in the Men's Coxless Pair the 2023 Pan Am Games in Santiago. Hedge was a member of the mixed eight that also won gold at the 2023 Pan Am Games. Hedge was a member of the 2024 US Olympic Rowing team, serving as an alternate for the Paris 2024 Summer Olympics.

== Biography ==
Raised in Morristown, New Jersey, Hedge attended Morristown High School. He then competed at Columbia University for 4 years, graduating in 2019.

Hedge rowed in the 2 seat in the US Rowing eight that set the course record at the Head of the Charles in 2022.

Hedge rowed for the United States at the 2023 World Rowing Championships in Belgrade and finished 6th in the Men's eight.
