= Los Gatos Rowing Club =

American rowing club

Los Gatos Rowing Club

The Los Gatos Rowing Club was started in 1979 to provide what was then mostly an eastern U.S. sport, to the kids in the Santa Clara Valley. In the past 20 years, more than 2,000 kids from 15 different high schools have passed through the program. Many have gone onto colleges and universities to row competitively, several have received rowing scholarships, and a few have been selected for Junior National Camps and are trying for the Olympics.

In 1994, the old boathouse was destroyed by an arsonist. Through the efforts of a highly motivated group of parents, coaches, and a huge number of new masters members, the boathouse was rebuilt on Lexington Reservoir. Without missing a single season, this group built a temporary boathouse of storage containers while they rushed about acquiring loans, grants and donations. Within two years the land, building and boats had all been acquired – one day before the time expired for the temporary boathouse to be dismantled.

Los Gatos Rowing Club currently provides both youth (middle school through high school) and masters programs, as well as community outreach programs including a program designed to introduce rowing to special youth and adults, a veterans' group, and a class for cancer survivors and caregivers.

== Junior team ==
Los Gatos Rowing Club high school program, called Junior Rowing, offers the rowing and racing experience to approximately 150 students from 10 Bay Area high schools such as Los Gatos High School, Bellarmine, Saint Francis, Presentation, Leigh, and Saratoga High School. The Junior spring season begins in January and runs through May, while the Junior Fall season starts in September and runs through to December. Weekday practices take place after school and weekend practices are in the early morning. Practice for novice is usually five days a week, while varsity often practices six or seven days. Each year, LGRC hosts at least one home regatta and travels to as many as 8 away competitions.

The Novice team consists of first year rowers, ages 14–18, regardless of their year in high school. Some novice rowers start early with the Autumn introductory conditioning program, held September through December.

The Varsity team consists of rowers who have already participated as Novice rowers or new participants whom the coaches feel have the ability to participate at the more advanced skill level.

Many LGRC rowers have been invited to the USRowing Youth National Championships. The event has been held each year in Cincinnati, Ohio for the first 16 years since its creation. Recently, the event location has changed to Oak Ridge, Tennessee with the 2014 championship to be held in Gold River, California. Boats can qualify at the Southwest Regional Championships which usually takes place in May.

Varsity Team Boats

Both Men and Women's Varsity teams consist of about 3-5 different boat rankings.

1st Boat = Varsity 8

2nd Boat = Jv8/lightweight 8.... These can be two separate boats, or the same boat.

3rd Boat = 3v8

4th boat = 4v8

5th boat = 5v8

Novice Team Boats

Both the Men and Women's Novice team consist of about 3-5 different boat rankings.

1st Boat = A Boat

2nd Boat = B Boat

3rd Boat = C Boat

4th Boat = D Boat

Unranked Boat (can be either good or bad) = Freshman Boat

National Tournament Success

Over the years the club has enjoyed success at the national level, including:

- Women's Lightweight 8+ Champions in 2007, 2008, and 2009
- Men's 2- Champion in 2012
- Men's 4+ Bronze Medalists in 2012
- Women's Lightweight 8+ Bronze Medalists in 2012
- Men's Lightweight 8+ Champions in 2013
- Men's Lightweight 4+ Silver Medalists in 2014
- Men's 2- Champion in 2019
- Men's 2- (2V) Bronze Medalists in 2019
- Men's U17 4x- Champion in 2021

== Masters Rowing Teams ==
The club also offers both facilities and coaching for masters (over 27) in both sweep rowing and sculling. The masters novice program meets in the early mornings, before work, and is for both men and women who have never rowed before, or are just starting their rowing careers. The women's and men's competitive coached programs also meet in the early mornings and is for those who have some years of rowing experience. This group competes locally, nationally, and internationally. Rowers with or without experience are welcome and should contact the club via the website. Masters rowers have rowed with success at various events all over the world as well as locally, winning US Rowing National medals and FIFA Masters Worlds medals, and have tried out for and represented a variety of nations at Olympic level.
