= Bruno Cetraro =

Uruguayan rower (born 1998)

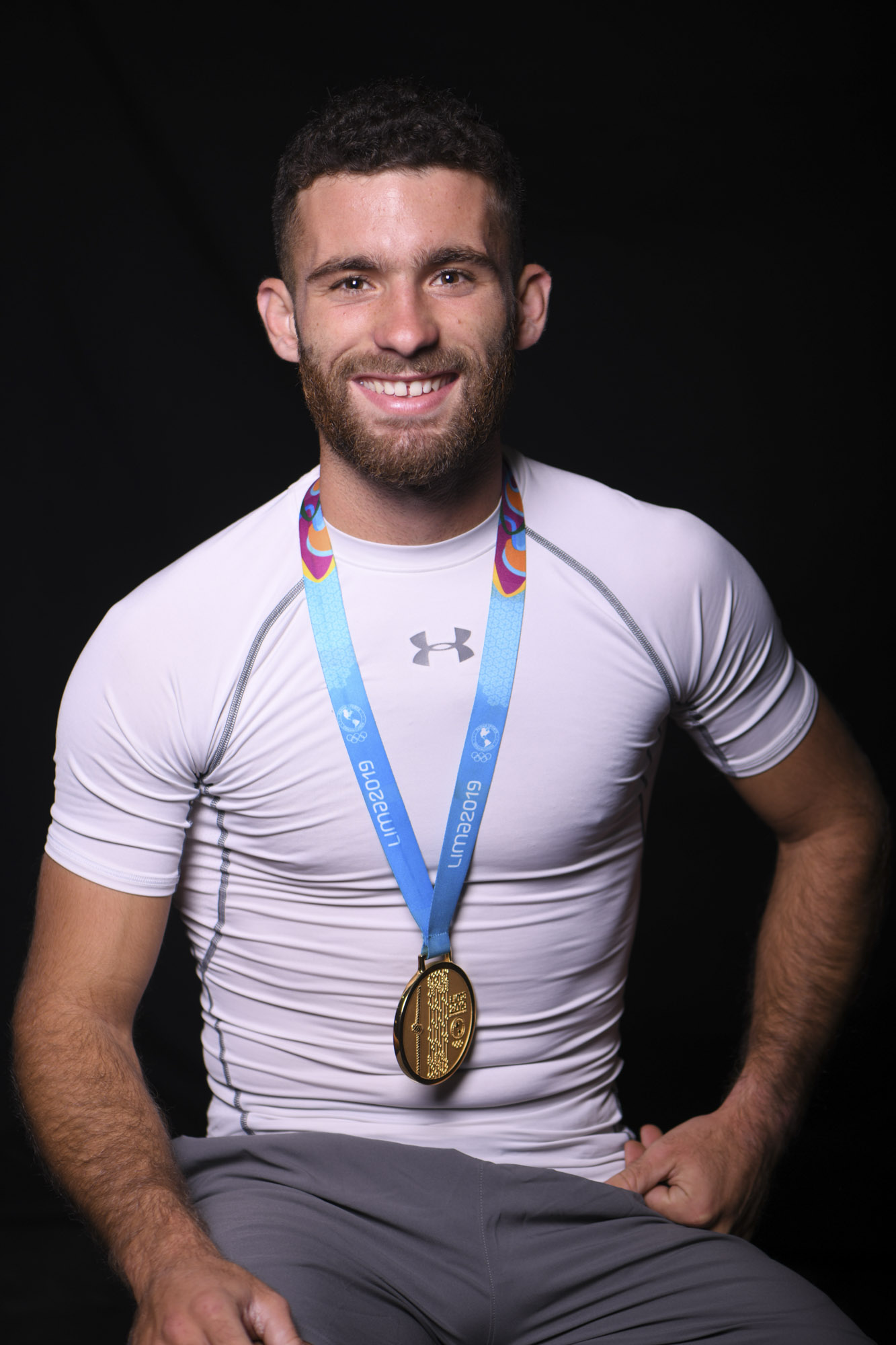
- Cetraro in 2019

Personal information
- Full name: Bruno Cetraro Berriolo
- Born: 20 March 1998 (age 28)

Sport
- Country: Uruguay
- Sport: Rowing
- Club: Montevideo Rowing Club
Medal record
Men's rowing
Representing Uruguay
Pan American Games
Gold medal – first place	2023 Santiago	Quadruple sculls
Silver medal – second place	2023 Santiago	Eight

Bruno Cetraro Berriolo (born 20 March 1998) is a Uruguayan rower. He represented Uruguay in rowing at the 2020 Olympic Games in Tokyo, racing in the lightweight men's double sculls.

He began rowing after his father saw Rodolfo Collazo competing at the 2008 Summer Olympics on television. A graduate of the University of the Republic, he is a member of Montevideo Rowing Club.

He won two gold medals at the Under-23 South American Rowing Championships in Rio de Janeiro in 2019. He also initially won the gold medal at the 2019 Pan American Games with Martín González, Leandro Salvagno and Marcos Sarraute, before Sarraute was stripped of his medal for a doping violation.

He has represented Uruguay at the 2015, 2017, 2019, 2022, and 2023 World Rowing Championships.

Along with Déborah Rodríguez, Cetraro served as flagbearer for Uruguay at the 2020 Summer Olympics in Tokyo. Together with Felipe Klüver, Cetraro finished second place in the semi-final of the lightweight double sculls, qualifying for the grand final of their category at the Olympic Games; in the finals they finished sixth.

Olympic Games
Preceded by Dolores Moreira	Flagbearer with Déborah Rodríguez for Uruguay; Tokyo 2020	Succeeded by
