= Rowing at the 2023 Pan American Games – Qualification =

The following is the qualification system and qualified countries for the Rowing at the 2023 Pan American Games competition.

== Qualification system ==
A total of 220 rowers will qualify to compete at the games. A country may only enter a maximum of 21 rowers. All qualification will be done at the 2023 Qualifier Championship (except the mixed eights which will be by entry only), where a specific number of boats will qualify in each of the 13 events. The gold medalists in both Men’s Single Sculls and the Women’s Single Sculls in the 2021 Junior Pan American Games received a direct quota for the Santiago 2023 Pan American Games, which will not be part of the maximum quota specified within the qualification process for these Games.

== Qualification timeline ==
Event	Date	Venue
2021 Junior Pan American Games	December 1–4, 2021	(Colombia) Cali
2023 Pan American Games Qualification Regatta	April 15–19, 2023	(Chile) San Pedro de La Paz

== Qualification summary ==
Nation	Men						Women						Mixed	Crews	Athletes
Nation	M1x	M2x	M4x	M2-	M4-	LM2x	W1x	W2x	W4x	W2-	W4-	LW2x	M8+	Crews	Athletes
Argentina	X	X	X	X	X	X	X	X	X	X	X	X	X	13	21
Brazil	X	X		X		X	X	X	X	X	X	X	X	10	17
Canada	X	X		X		X	X	X	X	X	X		X	9	15
Chile	X	X	X	X	X	X	X	X	X	X	X	X	X	13	21
Costa Rica							X							1	1
Cuba	X	X	X	X	X	X	X	X	X				X	9	14
Dominican Republic	X													1	1
Ecuador	X						X							2	2
El Salvador	X						X	X						3	4
Guatemala	X											X		2	3
Mexico	X	X	X	X	X	X	X	X		X	X	X	X	11	19
Nicaragua	X						X			X				3	4
Paraguay	XX	X					XX	X		X		X	X	8	12
Peru	X	X		X		X	X	X				X		7	12
United States	X	X	X	X	X	X	X	X	X	X	X	X	X	13	21
Uruguay	X	X	X	X	X	X	X	X		X		X	X	10	17
Venezuela	X	X					X	X						4	6
Total: 17 NOCs	19	14	6	12	6	9	19	14	6	12	6	9		134	220

== Men's events ==
=== Single sculls ===
Competition	Quotas	Qualified
Host nation	1	Chile
2021 Junior Pan American Games	1	Javier Andrés Torres (PAR)
2023 Pan American Games Qualification Regatta (doubling athletes)	5	Uruguay; Cuba; Mexico; Argentina; United States
2023 Pan American Games Qualification Regatta	12	Brazil; Canada; El Salvador; Venezuela; Peru; Paraguay; Nicaragua; Guatemala; Dominican Republic; Ecuador
Total	20	

=== Double sculls ===
Competition	Quotas	Qualified
Host nation	1	Chile
2023 Pan American Games Qualification Regatta (doubling athletes)	5	Uruguay; Cuba; Mexico; Argentina; United States
2023 Pan American Games Qualification Regatta	8	Canada; Brazil; Venezuela; Peru; Paraguay
Total	14	

=== Quadruple sculls ===
Competition	Quotas	Qualified
Host nation	1	Chile
2023 Pan American Games Qualification Regatta	5	Uruguay; Cuba; Mexico; Argentina; United States
Total	6	

=== Pairs ===
Competition	Quotas	Qualified
Host nation	1	Chile
2023 Pan American Games Qualification Regatta (doubling athletes)	5	Cuba; Uruguay; United States; Argentina; Mexico
2023 Pan American Games Qualification Regatta	6	Brazil; Canada; Peru
Total	12	

=== Fours ===
Competition	Quotas	Qualified
Host nation	1	Chile
2023 Pan American Games Qualification Regatta	5	Cuba; Uruguay; United States; Argentina; Mexico
Total	6	

=== Lightweight double sculls ===
Competition	Quotas	Qualified
2023 Pan American Games Qualification Regatta	9	Chile; Mexico; Uruguay; Brazil; Argentina; Canada; United States; Cuba; Peru
Total	9	

== Women's events ==
=== Single sculls ===
Competition	Quotas	Qualified
Host nation	1	Chile
2021 Junior Pan American Games	1	Nicole Anahi González (PAR)
2023 Pan American Games Qualification Regatta (doubling athletes)	5	United States; Brazil; Canada; Argentina; Cuba
2023 Pan American Games Qualification Regatta	12	Paraguay; Peru; Uruguay; Nicaragua; Mexico; El Salvador; Venezuela; Ecuador; Costa Rica
Total	20	

=== Double sculls ===
Competition	Quotas	Qualified
Host nation	1	Chile
2023 Pan American Games Qualification Regatta (doubling athletes)	5	United States; Brazil; Canada; Argentina; Cuba
2023 Pan American Games Qualification Regatta	8	Mexico; Uruguay; Venezuela; Paraguay; El Salvador; Peru
Total	14	

=== Quadruple sculls ===
Competition	Quotas	Qualified
Host nation	1	Chile
2023 Pan American Games Qualification Regatta	5	United States; Brazil; Canada; Argentina; Cuba
Total	6	

=== Pairs ===
Competition	Quotas	Qualified
Host nation	1	Chile
2023 Pan American Games Qualification Regatta (doubling athletes)	5	United States; Mexico; Canada; Brazil; Argentina
2023 Pan American Games Qualification Regatta	6	Uruguay; Paraguay; Nicaragua
Total	12	

=== Fours ===
Competition	Quotas	Qualified
Host nation	1	Chile
2023 Pan American Games Qualification Regatta	5	United States; Mexico; Canada; Brazil; Argentina
Total	6	

=== Lightweight double sculls ===
Competition	Quotas	Qualified
2023 Pan American Games Qualification Regatta	9	Chile; Argentina; United States; Brazil; Mexico; Peru; Paraguay; Guatemala; Uruguay
Total	9	

== Mixed events ==
=== Eights ===
Competition	Quotas	Qualified
Entry		
Total		
