= Olivia McMurray =

Canadian rower (born 1993)

Personal information
- Nationality: Canada
- Born: April 12, 1993 (age 33) Red Deer, Alberta
- Home town: Airdrie, Alberta

Sport
- College team: Calgary
Medal record
Women's rowing
Representing Canada
Pan American Games
Gold medal – first place	2023 Santiago	Eight
Silver medal – second place	2023 Santiago	Coxless pair

Olivia McMurray (born April 12, 1993) is a national team rower from Canada. McMurray became a Pan American Games champion when she won gold in women's eight at the 2023 Pan Am Games in Santiago. She also won a silver medal at the same games in the coxless pair with Abigail Dent. She placed 4th in the Mixed Eight final.

== International career ==
McMurray first represented Canada at the 2014 Commonwealth Rowing Championships in Strathclyde, Scotland, where she placed 4th in the Women's Pair event and 3rd in the Mixed Eight event.

In February 2023, McMurray was named to the Canadian Pan American Games Qualification Regatta team. She won a gold medal in the Women's Pair event, and placed 4th in the Women's Four event, thereby qualifying the full quota of women's sweep spots for Canada at the Pan American Games (Rowing at the 2023 Pan American Games – Qualification).

In September 2023, McMurray was named to the Canadian Pan American Games Team, in the Women's Eight, Women's Pair and Mixed Eight events. She placed 4th in the Mixed Eight, won a silver medal in the Women's Pair, and became the first-ever Pan American Games champion in the Women's Eight (2023 was the first time the Women's Eight had been contested at the Pan American Games). Rowing at the 2023 Pan American Games
