= Shaye de Paiva =

Canadian rower (born 2000)

Personal information
- Full name: Caroline Shaye Ann de Paiva
- Nationality: Canada
- Born: January 19, 2000 (age 26) Calgary, Alberta

Sport
- College team: Queens
Medal record
Women's rowing
Representing Canada
Pan American Games
Gold medal – first place	2023 Santiago	Eight
Bronze medal – third place	2023 Santiago	Double sculls
Bronze medal – third place	2023 Santiago	Quadruple sculls

Shaye de Paiva (born January 19, 2000) is a national team rower from Canada. De Paiva was a Pan American Games champion when she won gold in the women's eight at the 2023 Pan Am Games in Santiago as well as two bronze in the double and quadruple sculls.

== International career ==
Shaye de Paiva first represented Canada at the 2022 U23 World Rowing Championships in Varese, Italy, where she placed 7th in the U23 Women's Eight.

In February 2023, de Paiva was named to the Canadian Pan American Games Qualification Regatta team. She won a bronze medal in the Women's Double Sculls event, and placed 4th in the Women's Quadruple Sculls event, thereby qualifying the full quota of women's sculling spots for Canada at the Pan American Games (Rowing at the 2023 Pan American Games – Qualification).

In September 2023, de Paiva was named to the Canadian Pan American Games Team, in the Women's Eight, Women's Double Sculls and Women's Quadruple Sculls events. She won bronze medals in the Quad and Double, and became the first-ever Pan American Games champion in the Women's Eight (2023 was the first time the Women's Eight had been contested at the Pan American Games). Rowing at the 2023 Pan American Games
