= Lauren Miller (rower) =

American rower (born 1995)

Personal information
- Born: October 11, 1995 (age 30)
- Education: University of Minnesota
- Height: 6 ft 0 in (183 cm)
- Weight: 175 lb (79 kg)

Sport
- Sport: Rowing
Medal record
Women's rowing
Representing United States
Pan American Games
Gold medal – first place	2023 Santiago	Mixed Eight
Silver medal – second place	2023 Santiago	Women's eight
Silver medal – second place	2023 Santiago	Women's four

Lauren Miller (born October 11, 1995) is an American rower. Miller became a Pan American Games champion when she won gold in the mixed eight at the 2023 Pan American Games.

== Early life and education ==
Miller was born October 11, 1995 to Susan and Dan Miller and was raised in St. Cloud, Minnesota with her sister Kaydee Miller. She graduated from Saint Cloud Tech High School in 2013, having received varsity letters for swimming, track, and band. She then attended the University of Minnesota, where she received a Bachelor of Arts in neuroscience with a minor in art.

== Career ==
=== Collegiate career ===
While attending the University of Minnesota, Miller competed for the university's rowing team. Her first and second years at the university, she placed fifth at the Big Ten Championships. From 2014 to 2018, she was named an Academic All-Big Ten and CRCA Scholar athlete. Her final year, she was also the team captain.

=== National and international career ===
Miller has competed with USRowing for the women's four, women's eight, and mixed eight. In 2022, she placed second in the single at the Head of the Charles Regatta. The following year, she competed at the Pan American Games, where she received the gold in the mixed eight, as well as silver in the women's quad and eight.

=== Coaching ===
Miller is a graduate assistant coach with the University of Minnesota.
