= Melissa Márquez =

Mexican rower (born 1996)

Personal information
- Nationality: Mexican
- Born: 24 July 1996 (age 30)
- Weight: 57 kg (126 lb)

Sport
- Country: Mexico
- Sport: Rowing
- Event: Double sculls
Medal record
Women's rowing
Representing Mexico
World Championships
Gold medal – first place	2026 Amsterdam	Lwt double sculls

Melissa Márquez (born 24 July 1996) is a Mexican rower.

== Career ==
In July 2026, Márquez represented Mexico at the 2026 Central American and Caribbean Games and won a gold medal in the lightweight double sculls, along with Aylin Ibarra, with a time of 7:22.51. This was Mexico's first gold medal of the 2026 Central American and Caribbean Games. They also won a gold medal in the double sculls with a time of 7:19.85. The next month she competed at the 2026 World Rowing Championships and won a gold medal in the lightweight double sculls, along with Ibarra. This was the first time a Mexican duo won the double sculls event at the World Rowing Championships.
