= Abby Speirs =

Canadian rower (born 1998)

Personal information
- Nationality: Canada
- Born: September 25, 1998 (age 27) Victoria, British Columbia
- Home town: Victoria, British Columbia

Sport
- College team: Victoria
Medal record
Women's rowing
Representing Canada
Pan American Games
Gold medal – first place	2023 Santiago	Eight

Abby Speirs (born September 25, 1998) is a national team rower from Canada. Speirs became a Pan American Games champion when she won gold in the women's eight at the 2023 Pan Am Games in Santiago.

== International career ==
During her time in college, Speirs was a member of the University of Victoria Rowing Club. She placed in the top three several championships, including a first place finish in the Varsity 2- and 8+ races at Western CURCs and the Varsity 8+ boat at the Brown Cup regatta. In September 2023, Speirs was named to the Canadian Pan American Games Team, which was held in Santiago. She placed 4th in the Women's Four and Mixed Eight and was part of the eight-person crew that won the first Women's Eight at the Pan American Games.

== See also ==
- Rowing at the 2023 Pan American Games
