= Leandro Salvagno Rattaro =

Uruguayan rower (born 1984)

Personal information
- Nationality: Uruguay
- Born: 3 March 1984 (age 42) Colonia del Sacramento, Uruguay
- Height: 1.89 m (6 ft 2 1/2 in)
- Weight: 83 kg (183 lb)

Sport
- Sport: Rowing
- Club: Carmelo RC
- Coached by: Carlos Anchieri
Medal record
Men's rowing
Representing Uruguay
Pan American Games
Gold medal – first place	2023 Santiago	Quadruple sculls
Silver medal – second place	2003 Santo Domingo	Quadruple sculls
Bronze medal – third place	2023 Santiago	Coxless four
South American Games
Bronze medal – third place	2006 Buenos Aires	Quadruple sculls

Leandro Salvagno Rattaro (born March 3, 1984) is a Uruguayan rower, who won silver for the quadruple sculls at the 2003 Pan American Games in Santo Domingo, Dominican Republic, and a bronze at the 2006 South American Games in Buenos Aires, Argentina. He made his official debut at the 2004 Summer Olympics in Athens, where he finished second for the D-final, and 20th overall in the men's single sculls, with a fastest possible time of 7:01.33.

At the 2008 Summer Olympics in Beijing, Salvagno won the D-final of the men's single sculls, finishing ahead of Hong Kong's Law Hiu Fung by two seconds, with a time of 7:04.13. He only placed 19th out of 32 rowers in the overall rankings.

Salvagno, however, fell short in his bid to qualify for the 2012 Summer Olympics in London, after competing in the single sculls at the Latin America Continental Qualification Regatta in Buenos Aires. He finished abruptly in sixth place for the semi-final rounds, with a slowest possible time of 8:44.30.
