= Kendra Hartley =

Canadian rower (born 1992)

Personal information
- Nationality: Canada
- Born: October 11, 1992 (age 33) Edmonton, Alberta
- Home town: Calgary, Alberta

Sport
- College team: Alberta
Medal record
Women's rowing
Representing Canada
Pan American Games
Gold medal – first place	2023 Santiago	Eight
Bronze medal – third place	2023 Santiago	Quadruple sculls

Kendra Hartley (born October 11, 1992) is a national team rower from Canada. Hartley was a Pan American Games champion when she won gold in the women's eight at the 2023 Pan Am Games in Santiago as well as a bronze in the quadruple sculls.

== International career ==
Hartley first represented Canada in April 2023, on the Canadian Pan American Games Qualification Regatta team. She placed 4th in the Women's Four event, qualifying the full quota of women's sweep spots for Canada at the Pan American Games (Rowing at the 2023 Pan American Games – Qualification).

In September 2023, Hartley was named to the Canadian Pan American Games Team, in the Women's Four, Women's Quad and Women's Eight events. She placed 4th in the Women's Four, won a bronze medal in the Women's Quad, and became the first-ever Pan American Games champion in the Women's Eight (2023 was the first time the Women's Eight had been contested at the Pan American Games).
