= Leia Till =

Canadian rower (born 2001)

Personal information
- Nationality: Canada
- Born: June 30, 2001 (age 24)
- Home town: Potomac, Maryland

Sport
- College team: Virginia
Medal record
Women's rowing
Representing Canada
Pan American Games
Gold medal – first place	2023 Santiago	Eight
Henley Royal Regatta
Gold medal – first place	2024 Town Challenge Cup	Four

Leia Till (born June 30, 2001) is a national team rower representing Canada. She became a Pan American Games champion when she won gold in the women's eight at the 2023 Pan Am Games in Santiago.

== Collegiate career ==
Till attended the University of Virginia. During her 3 year competitive career at UVA (2021–2023), she won 3 ACC Championships, and was named a CRCA All- American all 3 years.

== International career ==
In September 2023, Till was named to the Canadian Pan American Games Team, in the Women's Four, Women's Eight and Mixed Eight events. She placed 4th in the Women's Four and Mixed Eight, and became the first-ever Pan American Games champion in the Women's Eight (2023 was the first time the Women's Eight had been contested at the Pan American Games). Rowing at the 2023 Pan American Games. Till won her second International title in July 2024, when she helped Canada win the Town Challenge Cup in a Women's Four at the Henley Royal Regatta.
