= Parker Illingworth =

Canadian rower (born 2002)

Personal information
- Citizenship: United States, Canada^{[explain status]}
- Born: March 7, 2002 (age 24) Seattle, Washington

Sport
- College team: Texas
Medal record
Women's rowing
Representing Canada
Pan American Games
Gold medal – first place	2023 Santiago	Eight
Bronze medal – third place	2023 Santiago	Quadruple sculls
World Rowing U23 Championships
Bronze medal – third place	2023 Plovdiv	Eight

Parker Illingworth (born March 7, 2002) is a Canadian national team rower. Illingworth was a Pan American Games champion when she won gold in the women's eight at the 2023 Pan Am Games in Santiago as well as a bronze in the quadruple sculls.

== College career ==
Illingworth rowed for the University of Texas for the 2021 and 2022 seasons, winning back to back NCAA National Championships.

Illingworth raced in the 2V8 at the 2021 and 2022 NCAA National Championships, placing 3rd in 2021 and 4th in 2022.

== International career ==
Illingworth first represented Canada at the 2023 U23 World Championships in Plovdiv, Bulgaria, where she won a bronze medal as part of the U23 Women's Eight crew.

In September 2023, Illingworth was named to the Canadian Pan American Games Team, in the Women's Eight, Women's Quadruple Sculls and Women's Four events. She placed 4th in the Women's Four, won a bronze in the Women's Quadruple Sculls, and became the first-ever Pan American Games champion in the Women's Eight (2023 was the first time the Women's Eight had been contested at the Pan American Games).
