= Ignacio Abraham =

Syrian footballer (born 1998)

Personal information
- Full name: Luis Ignacio Abraham
- Date of birth: 12 January 1998 (age 28)
- Place of birth: Arroyito, Argentina
- Height: 1.74 m (5 ft 9 in)
- Position: Left-back

Team information
- Current team: Banfield
- Number: 27

Youth career
- Juventud Unida

Senior career*
Years	Team	Apps	(Gls)
2019–2022	Juventud Unida	51	(0)
2022–2026	Estudiantes de Río Cuarto	52	(5)
2023	→ Chaco For Ever (loan)	16	(0)
2025	→ Banfield (loan)	21	(0)
2026–	Banfield	31	(0)

International career^{‡}
2024–	Syria	3	(0)
- * Club domestic league appearances and goals as of 17:55, 8 November 2026 (UTC) ‡ National team caps and goals as of 20:24, 24 March 2025 (UTC)

Luis Ignacio Abraham (born 12 January 1998) is a professional footballer who plays as a left back for Banfield. Born in Argentina, he represents the Syria national team.

== Club career ==
Born in Arroyito in Córdoba Province, Abraham began his career at Juventud Unida de Gualeguaychú in the third-tier Torneo Federal A, before playing for Estudiantes de Río Cuarto and Chaco For Ever one division higher in the Primera Nacional. In January 2025, he was loaned to Club Atlético Banfield in the Argentine Primera División for one year, with the option to buy in June for US$200,000 or in December for US$300,000.

On 23 January 2025, Abraham made his top-flight debut as the season began with a 1–0 win away to Defensa y Justicia. He came on in the 80th minute as a substitute for Ramiro Di Luciano. A year later, the option on his contract was taken up.

== International career ==
In September 2024, while playing in the second tier of Argentine football, Abraham was called up by the Syria national team for the King's Cup in Thailand. He was one of a number of Argentine-born players to be called up, coming from the Syrian community in the country. He made his debut on 11 October in a 1–0 semi-final win over Tajikistan, as an 87th-minute substitute. Three days later he started and received a yellow card in the 2–1 final loss to the hosts.
