= Alexis López =

Mexican rower (born 1997)

Personal information
- Full name: Alexis Bladimir López García
- Born: 1 May 1997 (age 29) San Felipe, Baja California, Mexico

Sport
- Country: Mexico
- Sport: Rowing
Medal record
Men's rowing
Representing Mexico
World Championships
Bronze medal – third place	2026 Amsterdam	Lightweight single sculls
Pan American Games
Gold medal – first place	2015 Toronto	Lightweight double sculls
Gold medal – first place	2019 Lima	Lightweight double sculls
Gold medal – first place	2023 Santiago	Lightweight double sculls
Silver medal – second place	2019 Lima	Lightweight coxless four

Alexis Bladimir López García (Note: In this Spanish name, the first or paternal surname is López and the second or maternal family name is García.) (born 1 May 1997) is a Mexican rower.

He won the bronze medal at the 2016 World Rowing U23 Championships. He won the final B at the 2017 World Championships – lightweight single sculls. At the 2019 Pan American Games, he won the gold medal in the lightweight double sculls, and a silver medal in the lightweight coxless four.

López was born in San Felipe, Baja California.
