= Rowing at the 2023 Pan American Games =

- Rowing pictogram
- Venue: Laguna Grande
- Start date: October 21, 2023
- End date: October 25, 2023
- No. of events: 15 (7 men, 7 women, 1 mixed)
- Competitors: 204 from 20 nations

Rowing competitions at the 2023 Pan American Games will be held between October 21 and 25, 2023 at the Laguna Grande in San Pedro de La Paz, Chile.

Fifteen medal events will be contested, seven for males, seven for females and one mixed. The men's eights event and the lightweight women's singles event was dropped and replaced with a mixed eights event. However, the eights events for both men and women were later added to the sports program.

== Qualification ==
A total of up to 220 rowers will qualify to compete at the games. A country may only enter a maximum of 21 rowers. All qualification will be done at the 2023 Qualifier Championship (except the mixed eights which will be by entry only), where a specific number of boats will qualify in each of the 13 events. The gold medalists in both Men’s Single Sculls and the Women’s Single Sculls in the 2021 Junior Pan American Games received a direct quota for the Santiago 2023 Pan American Games, which will not be part of the maximum quota specified within the qualification process for these Games.

== Participating nations ==
A total of 20 NOC's qualified rowers.

- Argentina (19)
- Barbados (1)
- Brazil (18)
- Canada (16)
- Chile (21)
- Colombia (1)
- Costa Rica (1)
- Cuba (15)
- Dominican Republic (5)
- Ecuador (2)
- El Salvador (2)
- Honduras (2)
- Independent Athletes Team (6)
- Mexico (20)
- Nicaragua (5)
- Paraguay (14)
- Peru (10)
- United States (21)
- Uruguay (17)
- Venezuela (8)

== Medal summary ==
=== Medal table ===
* Host nation (Chile)

Rank	Nation	Gold	Silver	Bronze	Total
1	United States	5	4	1	10
2	Chile*	3	5	2	10
3	Uruguay	2	2	1	5
4	Mexico	2	0	4	6
5	Cuba	1	2	1	4
6	Canada	1	1	2	4
7	Brazil	1	1	0	2
8	Argentina	0	0	2	2
8	Paraguay	0	0	2	2
Totals (9 entries)		15	15	15	45

=== Medalists ===
==== Men ====
Event	Gold	Silver	Bronze
Single sculls	Lucas Verthein; Brazil	James Plihal; United States	Juan José Flores; Mexico
Double sculls	Uruguay; Newton Seawright; Martín Zócalo	Cuba; Reidy Cardona; Carlos Ajete	United States; Mark Couwenhoven; Casey Fuller
Lightweight double sculls	Mexico; Miguel Ángel Carballo; Alexis López	Chile; César Abaroa; Eber Sanhueza	Argentina; Alejandro Colomino; Pedro Dickson
Quadruple sculls	Uruguay; Bruno Cetraro; Marcos Sarraute; Felipe Klüver; Leandro Salvagno	Chile; Francisco Lapostol; Brahim Alvayay; Óscar Vásquez; Andoni Habash	Mexico; Ricardo de la Rosa; Tomás Manzanillo; André Simsch; Rafael Mejía
Coxless pair	United States; Alexander Hedge; Ezra Carlson	Uruguay; Esteban Sosa; Leandro Rodas	Mexico; Hugo Reyes; Jordy Gutiérrez
Coxless four	Chile; Alfredo Abraham; Ignacio Abraham; Nahuel Reyes; Marcelo Poo	Cuba; Andrey Barnet; Leduar Suárez; Carlos Ajete; Reidy Cardona	Uruguay; Martín Zócalo; Marcos Sarraute; Newton Seawright; Leandro Salvagno
Eight	Cuba; Roberto Paz; Luis León; Henry Heredia; Francisco Romero; Andrey Barnet; Leduar Suárez; Carlos Ajete; Reidy Cardona; Juan Carlos González	Uruguay; Bruno Cetraro; Felipe Klüver; Leandro Rodas; Mauricio Lopez; Marcos Sarraute; Newton Seawright; Leandro Salvagno; Martín Zócalo	Chile; Oscar Vásquez; Marcelo Poo; Brahim Alvayay; Francisco Lapostol; Alfredo Abraham; Ignacio Abraham; Nahuel Reyes; Andoni Habash

==== Women ====
Event	Gold	Silver	Bronze
Single sculls	Kenia Lechuga; Mexico	Beatriz Tavares; Brazil	Nicole Martínez; Paraguay
Double sculls	United States; Veronica Nicacio; Madeleine Focht	Chile; Melita Abraham; Antonia Abraham	Canada; Alizée Brien; Shaye de Paiva
Lightweight double sculls	Chile; Antonia Liewald; Isidora Niemeyer	United States; Mary Wilson; Elizabeth Martin	Argentina; Sonia Baluzzo; Evelyn Silvestro
Quadruple sculls	United States; Grace Joyce; Veronica Nicacio; Madeleine Focht; Katherine Horvat	Chile; Cristina Hostetter; Victoria Hostetter; Melita Abraham; Antonia Abraham	Canada; Kendra Hartley; Parker Illingworth; Alizée Brien; Shaye de Paiva
Coxless pair	United States; Hannah Paynter; Isabela Darvin	Canada; Olivia McMurray; Abby Dent	Paraguay; Nicole Martínez; Alejandra Alonso
Coxless four	Chile; Melita Abraham; Antonia Abraham; Victoria Hostetter; Magdalena Nannig	United States; Hannah Paynter; Isabela Darvin; Cristina Pretto; Lauren Miller	Mexico; María García; Devanih Plata; Maite Arrillaga; Mildred Mercado
Eight	Canada; Leia Till; Abby Dent; Alizée Brien; Abby Speirs; Kendra Hartley; Olivia McMurray; Parker Illingworth; Shaye de Paiva; Kristen Kit	United States; Grace Joyce; Veronica Nicacio; Madeleine Focht; Katherine Horvat; Hannah Paynter; Isabela Darvin; Cristina Pretto; Lauren Miller; Colette Lucas-Conwell	Chile; Melita Abraham; Antonia Abraham; Isidora Niemeyer; Antonia Pichott; Antonia Liewald; Victoria Hostetter; Cristina Hostetter; Magdalena Nannig; Isis Correa

==== Mixed ====
Event	Gold	Silver	Bronze
Eight	United States; Isabela Darvin; Ezra Carlson; Alexander Hedge; James Plihal; Mark Couwenhoven; Lauren Miller; Hannah Paynter; Cristina Pretto; Colette Lucas-Conwell	Chile; Antonia Abraham; Melita Abraham; Alfredo Abraham; Ignacio Abraham; Óscar Vásquez; Francisco Lapostol; Magdalena Nannig; Victoria Hostetter; Isidora Soto	Cuba; Ana Laura Jiménez; Milena Venega; Andrey Barnet; Leduar Suárez; Natalie Morales; Yariulvis Cobas; Carlos Ajete; Reidy Cardona; Juan Carlos González

== See also ==
- Rowing at the 2024 Summer Olympics
