= Argentina at the 2023 Pan American Games =

- IOC code: ARG
- NOC: Argentine Olympic Committee

in Santiago, Chile 20 October 2023 – 5 November 2023
- Competitors: 508 in 38 sports
- Flag bearers (opening): Marcos Moneta & Sabrina Ameghino
- Flag bearers (closing): Facundo Conte & Isabel Di Tella
- Medals Ranked 7th: Gold 17 Silver 25 Bronze 33 Total 75

Pan American Games appearances (overview)
- 1951; 1955; 1959; 1963; 1967; 1971; 1975; 1979; 1983; 1987; 1991; 1995; 1999; 2003; 2007; 2011; 2015; 2019; 2023; 2027

Argentina competed at the 2023 Pan American Games in Santiago, Chile from October 20 to November 5, 2023. This was Argentina's 19th appearance at the Pan American Games, having competed at every edition of the games since the inaugural edition in 1951.

On 5 October 2023, the Argentine Olympic Committee officially named the team of 508 athletes (268 men and 240 women) competing in 38 sports (e-sports total of 14 is not included).

Rugby sevens player Marcos Moneta and kayaker Sabrina Ameghino were the country's flagbearers during the opening ceremony.

Volleyball player Facundo Conte and fencer Isabel Di Tella were the country's flagbearers during the closing ceremony.

During the most part of the Games, Argentine delegation struggled a lot to win medals, being outside the medal table top-10 and performing very low compared to the previous Games. However, the final two days for Argentina were successful and made a great recovery: the country won 12 of the 17 gold medals they finally obtained, and climbed from 12th place to 7th in the medal table.

== Medalists ==
The following competitors won medals at the games. In the discipline sections below, the medalists' names are bolded.

Medal	Name	Sport	Event	Date
Gold	Eugenia de Armas	Water skiing	Women's wakeboard	October 23
Gold	Kai Ditsch	Water skiing	Men's wakeboard	October 24
Gold	Facundo Díaz Acosta	Tennis	Men's singles	October 29
Gold	Isabel Di Tella	Fencing	Women's épée	November 1
Gold	Argentina men's national field hockey team: Tomás Santiago; Juan Catán; Nicolás Della Torre; Federico Monja; Tadeo Marcucci; Agustín Bugallo; Thomas Habif; Matías Rey; Santiago Tarazona; Lucas Toscani; Maico Casella; Tomás Domene; Agustín Mazzilli; Nicolás Keenan; Lucas Martínez; Agustín Machellet	Field hockey	Men's tournament	November 3
Gold	Agustín Vernice	Canoeing	Men's K-1 1000 m	November 4
Gold	Agustín Vernice; Gonzalo Carreras; Gonzalo Benassi; Manuel Micaz	Canoeing	Men's K-4 500 m	November 4
Gold	Mateo Majdalani; Eugenia Bosco	Sailing	Nacra 17	November 4
Gold	Julio Alsogaray; Malena Sciarra	Sailing	Snipe	November 4
Gold	Argentina national rugby sevens team: Santiago Alvarez Fourcade; Agustín Fraga; Luciano González; Matteo Graziano; Alejo Lavayén; Santiago Mare; Marcos Moneta; Matías Osadczuk; Joaquín Pellandini; Gastón Revol; German Schulz; Santiago Vera Feld	Rugby sevens	Men's tournament	November 4
Gold	Belén Casetta	Athletics	Women's 3000 metres steeplechase	November 4
Gold	Argentina men's national handball team: Diego Simonet; Federico Pizarro; Federico Fernández; Gastón Mouriño; Ignacio Pizarro; Juan Manuel Bar; Leonel Maciel; Lucas Moscariello; Nicolás Bono; Nicolás Bonanno; Pablo Vainstein; Pablo Simonet; Pedro Martínez; Santiago Baronetto	Handball	Men's tournament	November 4
Gold	Argentina women's national field hockey team: Clara Barberi; Agustina Gorzelany; Cristina Cosentino; Juana Castellaro; Valentina Costa Biondi; Valentina Raposo; Victoria Sauze; Agostina Alonso; Sofía Toccalino; Sofía Cairo; Rocío Sánchez Moccia; María José Granatto; Delfina Thome; Julieta Jankunas; Eugenia Trinchinetti; Pilar Campoy	Field hockey	Women's tournament	November 4
Gold	Argentina men's national basketball team: Franco Baralle; Pedro Barral; Juan Bocca; Martín Cuello; Tayavek Gallizzi; Lucas Giovannetti; Bautista Lugarini; Agustín Tapia; Fabián Barrios; Javier Saiz; Kevin Hernández; Santiago Scala	Basketball	Men's tournament	November 4
Gold	Cinthia Pinto; Lis García	Basque pelota	Women's rubber pelota doubles trinquete	November 5
Gold	Facundo Andreasen; Alfredo Villegas	Basque pelota	Men's rubber pelota doubles trinquete	November 5
Gold	José Torres	Cycling	Men's BMX freestyle	November 5
Silver	Fernanda Russo	Shooting	Women's 10 metre air rifle	October 21
Silver	Lucas Guzmán	Taekwondo	Men's –58 kg	October 21
Silver	Florencia Borelli	Athletics	Women's marathon	October 22
Silver	Federico Gil	Shooting	Men's skeet	October 22
Silver	Ulises Saravia	Swimming	Men's 100 m backstroke	October 23
Silver	María José Vargas; Natalia Méndez	Racquetball	Women's doubles	October 24
Silver	María José Vargas; Diego García	Racquetball	Mixed doubles	October 24
Silver	Tobías Giorgis	Water skiing	Men's overall	October 24
Silver	Daniel Villafañe	Gymnastics	Rings	October 24
Silver	María José Vargas; Natalia Méndez	Racquetball	Women's doubles	October 26
Silver	Brisa Gómez	Judo	Women's −57 kg	October 28
Silver	Ivo Cassini	Swimming	Men's 10 km open water	October 29
Silver	Eduardo Sepúlveda	Cycling	Men's road race	October 29
Silver	María Lourdes Carlé	Tennis	Women's singles	October 29
Silver	Argentina women's national handball team: Carolina Bono; Elke Karsten; Fátima Rosalez; Giuliana Gavilán; Graciela García; Lucía Crode; Luciana Mendoza; Macarena Gandulfo; Malena Cavo; Manuela Pizzo; Marisol Carratu; Martina Romero; Micaela Casasola; Rocío Campigli	Handball	Women's tournament	October 29
Silver	Brenda Rojas	Canoeing	Women's K-1 500 m	November 3
Silver	Gonzalo Benassi; Manuel Micaz	Canoeing	Men's K-2 500 m	November 3
Silver	Catalina Turienzo	Sailing	Women's kites	November 3
Silver	Brenda Rojas; Magdalena Garro	Canoeing	Women's K-2 500 metres	November 4
Silver	Sabrina Andrade	Basque pelota	Women's fronton	November 4
Silver	Federico Fernández	Basque pelota	Men's fronton	November 4
Silver	Argentina men's national volleyball team: Demián González; Bruno Lima; Agustín Gallardo; Facundo Conte; Gustavo Maciel; Nicolás Lazo; Marcos Meana; Tobías Scarpa; Ezequiel Vázquez; Sergio Soria; Mauro Zelayeta; Manuel Balague	Volleyball	Men's tournament	November 4
Silver	Donato Mastroianni	Roller sports	Men's free skating	November 4
Silver	Germán Chiaraviglio	Athletics	Men's pole vault	November 4
Silver	Jeremías Azaña; Leandro Romiglio; Roberto Pezzota	Squash	Men's team	November 5
Bronze	Macarena Ceballos	Swimming	Women's 100 metre breaststroke	October 21
Bronze	Giulia Sendra	Taekwondo	Women's –49 kg	October 21
Bronze	José Luis Acuña	Taekwondo	Men's –68 kg	October 21
Bronze	Agustín Alves	Taekwondo	Men's +80 kg	October 23
Bronze	Tobías Giorgis	Water skiing	Men's jump	October 23
Bronze	Alejandro Colomino; Pedro Dickson	Rowing	Men's lightweight double sculls	October 24
Bronze	Sonia Baluzzo; Evelyn Silvestro	Rowing	Women's lightweight double sculls	October 24
Bronze	María José Vargas	Racquetball	Women's singles	October 24
Bronze	Ramón Quiroga	Boxing	Men's –51 kg	October 26
Bronze	Abraham Buonarrigo	Boxing	Men's –80 kg	October 26
Bronze	Julia Riera; María Lourdes Carlé	Tennis	Women's doubles	October 28
Bronze	Martina Capurro Taborda; Facundo Díaz Acosta	Tennis	Mixed doubles	October 28
Bronze	Julia Riera	Tennis	Women's singles	October 29
Bronze	Argentina women's national basketball team: Malvina D’Agostino; Valeria Fernández; Agustina García; Victoria Gauna; Candela Gentinetta; Agustina Jourdehuil; Natassja Kolff; Agustina Marín; Carla Miculka; Delfina Saravia; Camila Suárez; Magalí Vilches	Basketball	Women's tournament	October 29
Bronze	Santino Basaldella	Surfing	Men's stand up paddleboard	October 30
Bronze	Augusto Servello	Fencing	Men's foil	October 31
Bronze	Gastón Alto; Horacio Cifuentes	Table tennis	Men's doubles	October 31
Bronze	Catriel Muriel	Wrestling	Men's freestyle 125 kg	November 1
Bronze	Alessandro Taccani; Jesús Andrés Lugones; Agustín Gusmán	Fencing	Men's team épée	November 2
Bronze	Agustín Destribats	Wrestling	Men's freestyle 65 kg	November 2
Bronze	Elián Larregina; Franco Florio; Tomás Mondino; Juan Ignacio Ciampitti; Bautista Diamante	Athletics	Men's 4 × 100 m relay	November 2
Bronze	Candelaria Sequeira; Martina Isequilla; Lucía Aziz; Sabrina Ameghino	Canoeing	Women's K-4 500 m	November 3
Bronze	Luca Impagnatiello	Karate	Men's kata	November 3
Bronze	Valentín Rossi	Canoeing	Men's K-1 1000 m	November 4
Bronze	Micaela Cortez	Basque pelota	Women's frontball	November 4
Bronze	Luciana Cardozo	Sailing	Laser radial	November 4
Bronze	Martina María Silva; Javier Conte; María Trinidad Silva	Sailing	Lightning	November 4
Bronze	Yamila Benítez	Karate	Women's 50 kg	November 4
Bronze	Santiago Ferrari	Gymnastics	Men's trampoline	November 4
Bronze	Gastón Alto; Horacio Cifuentes; Santiago Lorenzo	Table tennis	Men's team	November 4
Bronze	Argentina men's national water polo team: Diego Malnero; Ramiro Veich; Tomás Galimberti; Tomás Tilatti; Guido Martino; Tomás Echenique; Teo Soler; Eduardo Bonomo; Carlos Camnasio; Esteban Corsi; Guido Poggi; Nahuel Leona; Octavio Salas	Water polo	Men's tournament	November 4
Bronze	Martina Della Chiesa	Roller sports	Women's free skating	November 4
Bronze	Lorenzo Cardozo	Basque pelota	Men's doubles frontenis	November 5

Medals by sport
Sport	1st place, gold medalist(s)	2nd place, silver medalist(s)	3rd place, bronze medalist(s)	Total
Canoeing	2	3	2	**7**
Basque pelota	2	2	2	**6**
Sailing	2	1	2	**5**
Water skiing	2	1	1	**4**
Field hockey	2	0	0	**2**
Athletics	1	2	1	**4**
Tennis	1	1	3	**5**
Cycling	1	1	0	**2**
Handball	1	1	0	**2**
Fencing	1	0	2	**3**
Basketball	1	0	1	**2**
Rugby sevens	1	0	0	**1**
Racquetball	0	3	1	**4**
Swimming	0	2	1	**3**
Shooting	0	2	0	**2**
Taekwondo	0	1	3	**4**
Gymnastics	0	1	1	**2**
Roller sports	0	1	1	**2**
Judo	0	1	0	**1**
Squash	0	1	0	**1**
Volleyball	0	1	0	**1**
Boxing	0	0	2	**2**
Karate	0	0	2	**2**
Rowing	0	0	2	**2**
Table tennis	0	0	2	**2**
Wrestling	0	0	2	**2**
Surfing	0	0	1	**1**
Water polo	0	0	1	**1**
Total	17	25	33	75

Medals by day
Day	Date	1st place, gold medalist(s)	2nd place, silver medalist(s)	3rd place, bronze medalist(s)	Total
1	October 21	0	2	3	**5**
2	October 22	0	2	0	**2**
3	October 23	1	1	3	**5**
4	October 24	1	4	2	**7**
5	October 25	0	0	0	**0**
6	October 26	0	1	2	**3**
7	October 27	0	0	0	**0**
8	October 28	0	1	2	**3**
9	October 29	1	4	2	**7**
10	October 30	0	0	1	**1**
11	October 31	0	0	2	**2**
12	November 1	1	0	1	**2**
13	November 2	0	0	3	**3**
14	November 3	1	3	2	**6**
15	November 4	9	6	9	**24**
16	November 5	3	1	1	**5**
Total		17	25	33	75

== Competitors ==
The following is the list of number of competitors (per gender) participating at the games per sport/discipline.

Sport	Men	Women	Total
Archery	2	1	3
Artistic swimming	0	2	2
Athletics	18	8	26
Badminton	2	2	4
Basketball	16	16	32
Basque pelota	6	4	10
Boxing	4	6	10
Breaking	1	1	2
Canoeing	10	11	21
Cycling	15	9	24
Equestrian	9	3	12
Fencing	10	7	17
Field hockey	16	16	32
Football	0	18	18
Golf	2	2	4
Gymnastics	7	9	16
Handball	14	14	28
Judo	5	5	10
Karate	3	3	6
Modern pentathlon	3	3	6
Racquetball	2	2	4
Roller sports	5	5	10
Rowing	11	8	19
Rugby sevens	12	0	12
Sailing	9	10	19
Shooting	9	5	14
Sport climbing	3	3	6
Squash	3	0	3
Surfing	5	4	9
Swimming	15	15	30
Table tennis	3	3	6
Taekwondo	4	3	7
Tennis	3	4	7
Triathlon	2	2	4
Volleyball	14	14	28
Water polo	12	12	24
Water skiing	4	2	6
Weightlifting	2	3	5
Wrestling	7	2	9
Total	268	237	505

== Archery ==
Argentina qualified a male archer in individual compound by winning the 2022 South American Games. Argentina also qualified a male archer in individual recurve during the 2022 Pan American Archery Championships. Argentina qualified a female archer during the 2023 Copa Merengue.

Athlete	Event	Ranking Round		Round of 32	Round of 16	Quarterfinals	Semifinals	Final / BM	Rank
Athlete	Event	Score	Seed	Opposition Score	Opposition Score	Opposition Score	Opposition Score	Opposition Score	Rank
Damián Jajarabilla	Men's individual recurve	651	22	Santiesteban (CUB); L 3-7	Did not advance				
Florencia Leithold	Women's individual recurve	655	4	Baeza (CHI); L 4-6	Did not advance				
Iván Nikolajuk	Men's individual compound	698	13	—N/a	Hernandez (ESA); L 145-147	Did not advance			
Damián Jajarabilla; Florencia Leithold	Mixed team recurve	1306	6	—N/a	Venezuela; W 5-1	Brazil; L 2-6	Did not advance		

== Artistic swimming ==
Argentina qualified a team of two artistic swimmers at the 2022 South American Games.

Athlete	Event	Technical Routine		Free Routine (Final)			
Athlete	Event	Points	Rank	Points	Rank	Total Points	Rank
Tiziana Bonucci; Luisina Caussi	Women's duet	159.0233	8	92.9854	11	252.0088	10

== Athletics ==
Argentina qualified 26 athletes (18 men and 8 women) for the games.

Men
Track & road events

Athlete	Event	Semifinal		Final	
Athlete	Event	Time	Rank	Time	Rank
Franco Florio	100 m	10.52	6	Did not advance	
Elián Larregina	400 m	46.90	2 Q	50.90	7
Diego Lacamoire	1500 m	—N/a		3:40.67	7
José Zabala	1500 m	—N/a		3:41.49	8
Bruno de Genaro	400 m hurdles	51.40	4 Q	1:15.82	8
Julián Molina	3000 metres steeplechase	—N/a		9:03.03	9
Pedro Gómez	Marathon	—N/a		~~DNF~~	
Franco Florio; Elián Larregina; Tomás Mondino; Juan Ignacio Ciampitti; Bautista Diamante	4 × 100 m relay	39.53	2 Q	39.48	3rd place, bronze medalist(s)
Franco Florio; Elián Larregina; Diego Lacamoire; Pedro Emmer; Bruno de Genaro; Leandro París	4 × 400 m relay	—N/a		3:15.69	8
Juan Manuel Cano	20 km walk	—N/a		1:28:28	12

Field events

Athlete	Event	Result	Rank
Carlos Layoy	High jump	2.15	13
Germán Chiaraviglio	Pole vault	5.50	2nd place, silver medalist(s)
Ignacio Carballo	Shot put	19.62	7
Nazareno Sasia	Shot put	19.69	6
Joaquín Gómez	Hammer throw	72.36	7

Women
Track & road events

Athlete	Event	Semifinal		Final	
Athlete	Event	Time	Rank	Time	Rank
María Florencia Lamboglia	100 m	11.80	5	Did not advance	
María Victoria Woodward	100 m	12.15	6	Did not advance	
Mariana Borelli	1500 m	—N/a		4:28.37	10
Belén Casetta	3000 metres steeplechase	—N/a		9:39.47	1st place, gold medalist(s)
Clara Baiocchi	3000 metres steeplechase	—N/a		10:24.05	9
Florencia Borelli	Marathon	—N/a		2:27:29	2nd place, silver medalist(s)
María Florencia Lamboglia; María Victoria Woodward; Melanie Rosalez; Belén Fritzsche	4 × 100 m relay	44.72	2 Q	~~DNS~~	

Field events

Athlete	Event	Result	Rank
Ailén Armada	Discus throw	55.73	7
Daniela Gómez	Hammer throw	60.26	7

== Badminton ==
Argentina qualified a team of four athletes (two men and two women).

Men

Athlete	Event	First round	Second round	Quarterfinals	Semifinals	Final	Rank
Athlete	Event	Opposition Result	Opposition Result	Opposition Result	Opposition Result	Opposition Result	Rank
Santiago Otero	Singles	Shu (USA); L (10–21, 12–21)	Did not advance				
Nicolás Oliva	Singles	Armando (ESA); W (21–11, 21–8)	Coelho (BRA); L (17–21, 15–21)	Did not advance			
Santiago Otero; Nicolás Oliva	Doubles	—N/a	Bahamondez / Medel (CHI); W (21–13, 21–10)	Yakura / Dong (CAN); L (13–21, 12–21)	Did not advance		

Women

Athlete	Event	First round	Second round	Quarterfinals	Semifinals	Final	Rank
Athlete	Event	Opposition Result	Opposition Result	Opposition Result	Opposition Result	Opposition Result	Rank
Ailén Oliva	Singles	Barrios (ESA); W (21–9, 21–18)	Montre (CHI); L (13–21, 8–21)	Did not advance			
Iona Gualdi	Singles	Bye	Zhang (CAN); L (11–21, 8–21)	Did not advance			
Ailén Oliva; Iona Gualdi	Doubles	—N/a	A. Xu / K. Xu (USA); L (6–21, 5–21)	Did not advance			

Mixed

Athlete	Event	First round	Second round	Quarterfinals	Semifinals	Final	Rank
Athlete	Event	Opposition Result	Opposition Result	Opposition Result	Opposition Result	Opposition Result	Rank
Santiago Otero; Iona Gualdi	Doubles	Solís / Corleto (EAI); L (8–21, 13–21)	Did not advance				
Nicolás Oliva; Ailén Oliva	Doubles	Linarez / Jiménez (DOM); W (21-7, 21-19)	Lopes / Rocha (BRA); W WO	Castillo / Guevara (PER); L (13-21, 9-21)	Did not advance		

== Basketball ==
=== 5x5 ===
Summary

Team	Event	Group stage				Semifinal	Final / BM / Pl.	
Team	Event	Opposition Result	Opposition Result	Opposition Result	Rank	Opposition Result	Opposition Result	Rank
Argentina men	Men's tournament	Venezuela; W 95-88	Panama; W 85-77	Dominican Republic; W 82-81	1 Q	Mexico; W 108-73	Venezuela; W 79-65	1st place, gold medalist(s)
Argentina women	Women's tournament	Cuba; L 74-86	Chile; W 87-71	Puerto Rico; W 77-75	2 Q	Brazil; L 57-77	Bronze medal match Cuba; W 75-66	3rd place, bronze medalist(s)

Men's tournament

Argentina qualified a men's team (of 12 athletes) by winning the 2022 FIBA Americup.

Roster

- Franco Baralle
- Pedro Barral
- Juan Bocca
- Martín Cuello
- Tayavek Gallizzi
- Lucas Giovannetti
- Bautista Lugarini
- Agustín Tapia
- Fabián Barrios
- Javier Saiz
- Kevin Hernández
- Santiago Scala

Group A

Pos	Team	Pld	W	L	PF	PA	PD	Pts	Qualification
1	Argentina	3	3	0	262	246	+16	6	Semifinals
2	Venezuela	3	2	1	257	253	+4	5	Semifinals
3	Dominican Republic	3	1	2	252	227	+25	4	Fifth place game
4	Panama	3	0	3	198	243	−45	3	Seventh place game

Source: Santiago 2023

31 October 2023
10:30

Boxscore

Argentina	95–88 (OT)	Venezuela
Scoring by quarter: 24–19, 22–11, 17–17, 14–30, Overtime: 18–11
Pts: Scala 23; Rebs: Saiz 10; Asts: Scala 6		Pts: Sojo 22; Rebs: Graterol 10; Asts: Mijares 6

Multisport Complex 1, Santiago
Referees: Jorge Vásquez (PUR), Johnny Batista (PUR), Alan dos Santos (BRA)

1 November 2023
10:30

Boxscore

Panama	77–85	Argentina
Scoring by quarter: 15–22, 17–21, 28–25, 17–17
Pts: Sánchez 21; Rebs: Romero 8 Asts: Hall 5		Pts: Cuello 23; Rebs: Ramírez 8 Asts: Baralle, Cuello 5

Multisport Complex 1, Santiago
Referees: Johnny Batista (PUR), Felipe Ibarra (CHI), Fernando Cavalcante (BRA)

2 November 2023
10:30

Boxscore

Argentina	82–81 (OT)	Dominican Republic
Scoring by quarter: 19–4, 23–25, 15–24, 17–21, Overtime: 8–7
Pts: Saiz 19; Rebs: Lugarini 9 Asts: Baralle, Scala 6		Pts: Solano 30; Rebs: Guerrero 14; Asts: Suero 4

Multisport Complex 1, Santiago
Referees: Johnny Batista (PUR), Kristian Páez (ECU), Alan dos Santos (BRA)

Semifinal

3 November 2023
17:30

Boxscore

Argentina	108–73	Mexico
Scoring by quarter: 25–26, 32–13, 26–24, 25–10
Pts: Baralle 13; Rebs: Ramírez 8 Asts: Baralle, Scala 5		Pts: Andriassi 15; Rebs: de Haro 5 Asts: Machado 4

Multisport Complex 1, Santiago
Referees: Jorge Vásquez (PUR), Julio Anaya (PAN), Kevin Lei (CAN)

Gold medal match

4 November 2023
20:00

Boxscore

Argentina	79–65	Venezuela
Scoring by quarter: 17–12, 26–22, 27–10, 9–21
Pts: Lugarini 17; Rebs: Saiz 10; Asts: Cuello 4		Pts: Sojo 17; Rebs: Colmenares 10; Asts: Sifontes 3

Multisport Complex 1, Santiago
Referees: Luis Vásquez (PUR), Julio Anaya (PAN), Andrés Bartel (URU)

Women's tournament

Argentina qualified a women's team (of 12 athletes) by finishing seventh in the 2023 FIBA Women's AmeriCup.

Roster

- Malvina D’Agostino
- Valeria Fernández
- Agustina García
- Victoria Gauna
- Candela Gentinetta
- Agustina Jourdehuil
- Natassja Kolff
- Agustina Marín
- Carla Miculka
- Delfina Saravia
- Camila Suárez
- Magalí Vilches

Group A

Pos	Team	Pld	W	L	PF	PA	PD	Pts	Qualification
1	Cuba	3	2	1	223	194	+29	5 (Note: Cuba 86–74 Argentina)	Semifinals
2	Argentina	3	2	1	238	232	+6	5	Semifinals
3	Chile (H)	3	1	2	205	215	−10	4 (Note: Chile 86–60 Puerto Rico)	Fifth place game
4	Puerto Rico	3	1	2	207	232	−25	4	Seventh place game

Source: Santiago 2023
(H) Hosts
Notes:

25 October 2023
17:30

Boxscore

Cuba	86–74	Argentina
Scoring by quarter: 24–15, 26–16, 17–15, 19–28
Pts: Montero 17; Rebs: Despaigne 9 Asts: Galindo 7		Pts: Suárez 23; Rebs: D'Agostino 7 Asts: three players 3

Multisport Complex 1, Santiago
Referees: Julio Anaya (PAN), Fernando Cavalcante (BRA), Kelsey Kisilevich (CAN)

26 October 2023
20:00

Boxscore

Argentina	87–71	Chile
Scoring by quarter: 15–20, 25–20, 18–14, 29–17
Pts: Gentinetta 23; Rebs: Gentinetta 11; Asts: Suárez 7		Pts: Carrasco, Ovalle 13; Rebs: Ovalle 5 Asts: García 5

Multisport Complex 1, Santiago
Referees: Carlos Vélez (COL), Kristian Páez (ECU), Krishna Domínguez (MEX)

27 October 2023
17:30

Boxscore

Puerto Rico	75–77	Argentina
Scoring by quarter: 29–30, 14–17, 16–14, 16–16
Pts: Benítez, Quiñones 21; Rebs: Quiñones 9 Asts: Hilaire 5		Pts: Suárez 22; Rebs: Gentinetta, Jourdheuil 7 Asts: Gentinetta 4

Multisport Complex 1, Santiago
Referees: Daniel García (VEN), Fernando Cavalcante (BRA), Kevin Lei (CAN)

Semifinals

28 October 2023
20:00

Boxscore

Brazil	77–57	Argentina
Scoring by quarter: 27–17, 15–18, 19–11, 16–11
Pts: Zabani 19; Rebs: Fausto 13; Asts: Darrigo, Zabani 4		Pts: Gauna 14; Rebs: three players 5 Asts: Fernández, Suárez 3

Multisport Complex 1, Santiago
Referees: Luis Vázquez (PUR), Andrés Bartel (URU), Kevin Lei (CAN)

Bronze medal match

29 October 2023
17:00

Boxscore

Cuba	66–75	Argentina
Scoring by quarter: 12–23, 18–16, 16–19, 20–17
Pts: Galindo 27; Rebs: Contreras 8 Asts: Armentero, Montero 3		Pts: Suárez 27; Rebs: Gauna, Gentinetta 11; Asts: Gauna 5

Multisport Complex 1, Santiago
Referees: Alan dos Santos (BRA), Carmelo de la Rosa (PUR), Aline García (URU)

=== 3x3 ===
Summary

Team	Event	Preliminary round			Quarterfinal	Semifinal	Final / BM / Pl.	
Team	Event	Opposition Result	Opposition Result	Rank	Opposition Result	Opposition Result	Opposition Result	Rank
Argentina men	Men's tournament	Uruguay; L 20-21	Chile; L 17-22	3	Did not advance			
Argentina women	Women's tournament	Uruguay; W 18-9	Brazil; L 11-13	2	Colombia; L 9-17	Did not advance		

Men's tournament

Argentina qualified a men's team (of 4 athletes) by finishing as one of the six best non qualified teams in the FIBA 3x3 Rankings.

Roster

- Juan Fernández Chávez
- Ariel Ramos
- Felipe Bonfigli
- Gerónimo Ramallo

Preliminary round

Pos	Team	Pld	W	L	PF	PA	PD	Qualification
1	Chile (H)	2	2	0	44	30	+14	Quarterfinals
2	Uruguay	2	1	1	34	42	−8	Quarterfinals
3	Argentina	2	0	2	37	43	−6	

Source: Report
Rules for classification: 1) Wins; 2) Head-to-head record; 3) Points scored.
(H) Hosts

21 October 2023
16:30

Report

Argentina	20–21	Uruguay
Pts: Ramos 9		Pts: Alvarez 14

Estadio Español
Referees: Sonia Maldonado (PUR) / Yilizeth Vence (COL)

22 October 2023
16:00

Report

Chile	22–17	Argentina
Pts: Silva 9		Pts: Ramos 7

Estadio Español
Referees: Jorge Garcia (DOM) / Yilizeth Vence (COL)

Women's tournament

Argentina qualified a women's team (of 4 athletes) by finishing as one of the six best non qualified teams in the FIBA 3x3 Rankings.

Roster

- Natacha Pérez
- Ornella Santana
- Aylén Valdez
- Delfina Gentinetta

Preliminary round

Pos	Team	Pld	W	L	PF	PA	PD	Qualification
1	Brazil	2	2	0	35	23	+12	Quarterfinals
2	Argentina	2	1	1	29	22	+7	Quarterfinals
3	Uruguay	2	0	2	21	40	−19	

Source: Report
Rules for classification: 1) Wins; 2) Head-to-head record; 3) Points scored.

21 October 2023
17:30

Report

Argentina	18–9	Uruguay
Pts: Pérez 6		Pts: Aza 4

Estadio Español Las Condes, Santiago
Referees: Marie Houle (CAN), Jorge García (DOM)

22 October 2023
14:30

Report

Argentina	11–13	Brazil
Pts: Gentinetta 5		Pts: Domingos 6

Estadio Español Las Condes, Santiago
Referees: Nicolás Sarli (URU), Yilizeth Vence (COL)

Quarterfinals

22 October 2023
18:00

Report

Colombia	17–9	Argentina
Pts: Muñoz 7		Pts: Aylen Valdez 4

Estadio Español Las Condes, Santiago
Referees: Ana Zachi (BRA), Marie Houlie (CAN)

== Basque pelota ==
Argentina qualified a team of 10 athletes (six men and four women) through the 2022 Basque Pelota World Championship and the 2023 Pan American Basque Pelota Tournament.

Men

Athlete	Event	Preliminary round					Semifinal	Final / BM	
Athlete	Event	Opposition Score	Opposition Score	Opposition Score	Opposition Score	Rank	Opposition Score	Opposition Score	Rank
Federico Fernández	Fronton rubber ball	Perez (MEX); L 11-15, 5-15	González (CUB); W 15-5, 15-6	Bolelli (CHI); W 15-6, 15-4	Miranda (BOL); W WO	2 Q	—N/a	Perez (MEX); L 14-15, 13-15	2nd place, silver medalist(s)
Facundo Andreasen; Alfredo Villegas	Doubles trinquete rubber ball	Rodriguez / Garcia (MEX); W 15-7, 15-9	Pelua / Pinto (URU); W 15-6, 15-9	Escapa / Bellido (PER); W 15-4, 15-5	Stabon / Romero (CHI); W 15-7, 15-8	1 Q	—N/a	Rodriguez / Garcia (MEX); W 15-8, 15-2	1st place, gold medalist(s)
Lorenzo Cardozo; Emiliano García	Doubles frontenis	Bezada / Yupanqui (PER); W 14-15, 15-10, 10-3	Espinoza / Espinoza (USA); L 13-15, 5-15	García / González (CHI); W 15-8, 15-12	González / Torres (MEX); L 2-15, 3-15	3 Q	—N/a	Bronze medal match García / González (CHI); W 15-9, 15-8	3rd place, bronze medalist(s)
Nicolás Comas	Frontball	Fouilloux (CHI); W 12-7, 12-7	Airala (URU); W12-5, 12-4	Alvarez (MEX); L 2-12, 5-12	—N/a	2 Q	Abréu (CUB); L 9-12, 7-12	Bronze medal match Otheguy (BRA); L 8-12, 2-12	4

Women

Athlete	Event	Preliminary round					Semifinal	Final / BM	
Athlete	Event	Opposition Score	Opposition Score	Opposition Score	Opposition Score	Rank	Opposition Score	Opposition Score	Rank
Sabrina Andrade	Fronton rubber ball	Valderrama (CHI); W 15-8, 15-12	Alvarez (CUB); W 15-6, 15-3	Noriega (MEX); L 11-15, 15-7, 9-10	Morell (URU); W 15-2, 15-2	2 Q	—N/a	Noriega (MEX); L 14-15, 8-15	2nd place, silver medalist(s)
Cinthia Pinto; Lis García	Doubles trinquete rubber ball	Figueroa / Puentes (MEX); W 15-13, 15-10	Vicente / Cuestas (URU); W 15-8, 15-3	Castillo / Arellano (VEN); W 15-3, 15-2	Bastarrica / Domínguez (CHI); W 15-4, 15-2	1 Q	—N/a	Figueroa / Puentes (MEX); W 15-10, 15-10	1st place, gold medalist(s)
Micaela Cortez	Frontball	Solas (CHI); W 12-8, 6-12, 7-4	Reyes (MEX); L 12-9, 12-1	Araya (CRC); W 12-5, 12-2	—N/a	2 Q	Acosta (URU); L 8-12, 6-12	Bronze medal match Leoncio (CUB); W 8-12, 12-9, 7-2	3rd place, bronze medalist(s)

== Boxing ==
Argentina qualified ten boxers (four men and six women).

Men

Athlete	Event	Round of 32	Round of 16	Quarterfinals	Semifinals	Final	Rank
Athlete	Event	Opposition Result	Opposition Result	Opposition Result	Opposition Result	Opposition Result	Rank
Ramón Quiroga	–51 kg	—N/a	Tapia (CHI); W 5–0	Delgado (ECU); W 4-1	Trindade (BRA); L 1-4	Did not advance	3rd place, bronze medalist(s)
Luciano Amaya	–63.5 kg	Pezo (PER); W RSC	Toussaint (DMA); W RSC	Sanford (CAN); L 0-5	Did not advance		
Joel Mafauad	–71 kg	—N/a	Barros (CHI); W RSC	Rodriguez (ECU); L 0-5	Did not advance		
Abraham Buonarrigo	–80 kg	—N/a	Amsterdam (GUY); W 5–0	Beausejour (CAN); W 4–1	López (CUB); L 0-5	Did not advance	3rd place, bronze medalist(s)

Women

Athlete	Event	Round of 16	Quarterfinals	Semifinals	Final	Rank
Athlete	Event	Opposition Result	Opposition Result	Opposition Result	Opposition Result	Rank
Aldana López	–50 kg	Gómez (MEX); W 5–0	Valencia (COL); L 2-3	Did not advance		
Sofía Robles	–54 kg	Bye	Gomez (VEN); L 0-5	Did not advance		
Milagros Herrera	–57 kg	Romeu (BRA); L 0–5	Did not advance			
Victoria Saputo	–60 kg	Munoz (DOM); W 5–0	Palacios (ECU); L 0-5	Did not advance		
Lucía Pérez	–66 kg	Jackman (GUY); W RSC	Cavanagh (CAN); L 0–5	Did not advance		
Lorena Balbuena	–75 kg	Pereira (BRA); L 0–5	Did not advance			

== Breaking ==
Argentina qualified two breakdancers through the WDSF World Rankings.

Athlete	Nickname	Event	Round robin				Quarterfinal	Semifinal	Final / BM	
Athlete	Nickname	Event	Opposition Result	Opposition Result	Opposition Result	Rank	Opposition Result	Opposition Result	Opposition Result	Rank
Mariano Carvajal	Broly	B-Boys	NiñoNino (MEX); D 1–1	Rato (BRA); L 0-2	Gravity (USA); L 0-2	3	Did not advance			
Abril Molina	Abril	B-Girls	Monchi (PER); W 2–0	Swami (MEX); L 0-2	La Vix (USA); W 2–0	3	Did not advance			

== Canoeing ==
=== Slalom ===
Argentina qualified a total of six slalom athletes (three men and three women).

Athlete	Event	Preliminary round			Repechage	Semifinal		Final	
Athlete	Event	Run 1	Run 2	Rank	Rank	Time	Rank	Time	Rank
Sebastián Rossi	Men's C-1	89.26	82.34	2 Q	—N/a	96.10	1 Q	110.65	4
Lucas Rossi	Men's K-1	79.71	76.59	2 Q	—N/a	141.70	7	Did not advance	
Matías Contreras	Men's EK-1	52.00	—N/a	8 Q	—N/a		3	Did not advance	
Iris Castiglione	Women's C-1	151.66	98.84	3 Q	—N/a	182.65	3 Q	182.72	4
María Luz Cassini	Women's K-1	97.77	97.47	4 Q	—N/a	241.28	7	Did not advance	
María Luz Cassini	Women's EK-1	56.10	—N/a	6 Q	Bye		2 Q		4
Nadia Riquelme	Women's EK-1	DNF	—N/a	DNF	Did not advance				

=== Sprint ===
Argentina qualified a total of 15 sprint athletes (seven men and eight women).

Men

Athlete	Event	Heat		Semifinal		Final	
Athlete	Event	Time	Rank	Time	Rank	Time	Rank
Joaquín Lukac	C-1 1000 m	4:36.52	4	4:34.52	7 FB	5:01.91	12
Benjamín Cardozo; Joaquín Lukac	C-2 500 m	—N/a				1:53.48	7
Valentín Rossi	K-1 1000 m	3:40.58	1 FA	Bye		3:35.49	3rd place, bronze medalist(s)
Agustín Vernice	K-1 1000 m	3:38.33	1 FA	Bye		3:29.73	1st place, gold medalist(s)
Gonzalo Benassi; Manuel Micaz	K-2 500 m	1:31.59	1 FA	Bye		1:31.25	2nd place, silver medalist(s)
Agustín Vernice; Gonzalo Carreras; Gonzalo Benassi; Manuel Micaz	K-4 500 m	—N/a				1:20.80	1st place, gold medalist(s)

Women

Athlete	Event	Heat		Semifinal		Final	
Athlete	Event	Time	Rank	Time	Rank	Time	Rank
Martina Vela	C-1 200 m	54.77	4	54.86	5 FB	50.35	9
Martina Vela; Tais Trimarchi	C-2 500 m	—N/a				2:17.72	7
Brenda Rojas	K-1 500 m	1:51.60	2 FA	Bye		1:52.01	2nd place, silver medalist(s)
Brenda Rojas; Magdalena Garro	K-2 500 m	1:45.56	1 FA	Bye		1:42.45	2nd place, silver medalist(s)
Candelaria Sequeira; Martina Isequilla; Lucía Aziz; Sabrina Ameghino	K-4 500 m	—N/a				1:36.79	3rd place, bronze medalist(s)

== Cycling ==
Argentina qualified a total of 26 cyclists (15 men and 11 women).

=== BMX ===
Argentina qualified a female cyclist in BMX race after winning the event in the 2021 Junior Pan American Games and four cyclists in BMX race through the UCI World Ranking of Nations.

Freestyle

Athlete	Event	Seeding		Final	
Athlete	Event	Points	Rank	Points	Rank
José Torres	Men	80.83	1 Q	86.00	1st place, gold medalist(s)
Analía Zacarías	Women	61.83	2 Q	62.00	4

Racing

Athlete	Event	Ranking round		Quarterfinal		Semifinal		Final	
Athlete	Event	Time	Rank	Points	Rank	Points	Rank	Time	Rank
Gonzalo Molina	Men	32.260	3	7	1 Q	10	3 Q	1:44.800	8
Emiliano de la Fuente	Men	32.750	6	7	1 Q	7	2 Q	34.200	6

=== Mountain biking ===
Argentina qualified 4 athletes at the 2023 Pan American Championships.

Athlete	Event	Time	Rank
Catriel Soto	Men's Cross-country	1:21:44	7
Joel Contreras	Men's Cross-country	1:22:01	8
Agustina Apaza	Women's Cross-country	1:25:51	4
Inés Gutiérrez	Women's Cross-country	LAP	

=== Road ===
Argentina qualified 3 cyclists at the Pan American Championships.

Athlete	Event	Time	Rank
Eduardo Sepúlveda	Men's road race	3:37:57	2nd place, silver medalist(s)
Rubén Ramos	Men's road race	3:47:08	20
Laureano Rosas	Men's road race	3:43:35	10
Tomás Contte	Men's road race	3:46:17	15
Laureano Rosas	Men's time trial	49:23.94	8
Irma Greve	Women's road race	DNF	
Maribel Aguirre	Women's road race	3:00:24	23

=== Track ===
Argentina qualified a team of 12 cyclists (8 men and 4 women).

Sprint

Athlete	Event	Qualification		Round of 16	Repechage 1	Quarterfinals	Semifinals	Final	
Athlete	Event	Time	Rank	Opposition Time	Opposition Time	Opposition Result	Opposition Result	Opposition Result	Rank
Bautista Rodriguez	Men's individual	10.134	13	Did not advance					
Lucas Vilar	Men's individual	9.958	8 Q	Quintero (COL); L 10.134-9.814	Ruiz (MEX); Verdugo (MEX); L	Did not advance			
Valentina Luna	Women's individual	11.502	14	Did not advance					
Natalia Vera	Women's individual	11.318	10 Q	Verdugo (MEX); L	Orban (CAN); Salazar (COL); L	Did not advance			
Bautista Rodriguez; Leandro Bottasso; Lucas Vilar	Men's team	44.670	5	—N/a				Did not advance	
Milagros Sanabria; Valentina Luna; Natalia Vera	Women's team	50.889	5	—N/a				Did not advance	

Pursuit

Athlete	Event	Qualification		Semifinals	Finals	
Athlete	Event	Time	Rank	Opposition Result	Opposition Result	Rank
Tomás Contte; Agustín Ferrari; Marcos Méndez; Tomás Moyano; Rubén Ramos	Men's team	4:08.908	4	Canada; L 4:02.327–OVL	Did not advance	

Keirin

Athlete	Event	Heats	Final
Athlete	Event	Rank	Rank
Lucas Vilar	Men's	4 FB	7
Natalia Vera	Women's	2 FA	6

Madison

Athlete	Event	Points	Rank
Tomás Contte; Marcos Méndez	Men's	DSQ	
Maribel Aguirre; Irma Greve	Women's	5	5

Omnium

Athlete	Event	Scratch race		Tempo race		Elimination race		Points race		Total	
Athlete	Event	Points	Rank	Points	Rank	Points	Rank	Points	Rank	Points	Rank
Tomás Contte	Men's	30	6	32	5	24	9	8	7	94	8
Maribel Aguirre	Women's	22	10	26	8	24	9	20	9	104	8

== Equestrian ==
Argentina qualified a full team of 12 equestrians (four in Dressage, Eventing and Jumping).

=== Dressage ===
Athlete	Horse	Event	Qualification				Grand Prix Freestyle / Intermediate I Freestyle	
Athlete	Horse	Event	Grand Prix / Prix St. Georges		Grand Prix Special / Intermediate I		Grand Prix Freestyle / Intermediate I Freestyle	
Athlete	Horse	Event	Score	Rank	Score	Rank	Score	Rank
Micaela Mabragaña	Bradley Cooper	Individual	68.130	16	70.447	15	72.995	13
Florencia Manfredi	Hand's Up Chaparrita Z	Individual	63.353	35	63.529	31	Did not advance	
Gabriel Armando	San Rio	Individual	66.935	23	68.447	20	Did not advance	
Fiorella Mengani	Assirio D'Atela	Individual	66.544	24	65.447	29	Did not advance	
Florencia Manfredi; Micaela Mabragaña; Gabriel Armando; Fiorella Mengani	See above	Team	201.609	6	405.950	5	—N/a	

=== Eventing ===
Athlete	Horse	Event	Dressage		Cross-country		Jumping		Total	
Athlete	Horse	Event	Points	Rank	Points	Rank	Points	Rank	Points	Rank
Juan Benítez Gallardo	Chaman Ginn	Individual	45.1	25	16	15	10.4	15	71.5	15
Luciano Brunello	Cash des Cedres	Individual	46.1	28	18.4	17	36.8	19	101.3	19
Juan Candisano	Remonta Urnelia	Individual	39.1	18	~~EL~~		Did not advance			
Javier Rawson	Baral Villerster	Individual	45.3	27	23.2	18	12.8	16	81.3	16
Juan Benítez Gallardo; Luciano Brunello; Juan Candisano; Javier Rawson	See above	Team	129.5	6	194.1	4	254.1	5	—N/a	

=== Jumping ===
Athlete	Horse	Event	Qualification								Final					
Athlete	Horse	Event	Round 1		Round 2		Round 2B		Total		Round A		Round B		Total	
Athlete	Horse	Event	Result Time	Rank	Result Time	Rank	Result Time	Rank	Result Time	Rank	Result Time	Rank	Result Time	Rank	Result Time	Rank
Damián Ancic	Santa Rosa Chabacon	Individual	84.01	23	74.94	9	75.19	1	9.57	12	Did not advance				9.57	29
Leandro Moschini	Abril Iconthon	Individual	82.97	21	79.45	20	76.31	1	12.05	16	72.72	4	61.99	8	21.05	10
Ignacio Maurín	Chaquitos PS	Individual	78.25	8	74.74	1	75.42	25	10.69	14	72.45	4	58.77	11	22.69	12
José María Larocca	Finn Lente	Individual	81.41	15	76.94	9	77.70	21	13.27	19	70.86	1	61.03	8	18.27	8
Damián Ancic; Leandro Moschini; Ignacio Maurín; José María Larocca	See above	Team	12.01	14	20.01	5	—N/a		25.01	5	—N/a					

== Fencing ==
Argentina qualified a full team of 18 fencers (nine men and nine women), after all six teams finished at least in the top seven at the 2022 Pan American Fencing Championships in Ascuncion, Paraguay. Dante Cerquetti and Candela Espinosa Veloso also qualified after each winning a gold medal at the 2021 Junior Pan American Games in Cali, Colombia. This mean the team size was 20 fencers (ten per gender).

Individual
Men

Athlete	Event	Pool Round		Round of 16	Quarterfinals	Semifinals	Final	
Athlete	Event	Victories	Seed	Opposition Score	Opposition Score	Opposition Score	Opposition Score	Rank
Alessandro Taccani	Épée	1V-5D	7	Did not advance				
Jesús Lugones	Épée	2V-3D	5 Q	Limardo (VEN); L 8-9	Did not advance			
Nicolás Marino	Foil	4V-1D	2 Q	Servello (ARG); L 14-15	Did not advance			
Augusto Servello	Foil	2V-3D	4 Q	Marino (ARG); W 15-14	Alarcón (CHI); W 15-7	Itkin (USA); L 4-15	Did not advance	3rd place, bronze medalist(s)
Pascual Di Tella	Sabre	3V-2D	3 Q	Zea (MEX); W 15-13	Arfa (CAN); L 12-15	Did not advance		
Stefano Lucchetti	Sabre	4V-2D	2 Q	Cuellar (COL); L 13-15	Did not advance			

Women

Athlete	Event	Pool Round		Round of 16	Quarterfinals	Semifinals	Final	
Athlete	Event	Victories	Seed	Opposition Score	Opposition Score	Opposition Score	Opposition Score	Rank
Isabel Di Tella	Épée	3V-2D	2 Q	Vásquez (CHI); W 15-10	Moellhausen (BRA); W 15-13	Fernández (CHI); W 15-11	Doig (PER); W 15-9	1st place, gold medalist(s)
Melisa Englert	Épée	2V-3D	4 Q	Verret (CAN); L 9-15	Did not advance			
Athina González	Foil	1V-4D	4 Q	Dubrovich (USA); L 9-15	Did not advance			
Lucía Ondarts	Foil	1V-4D	6 Q	Harvey (CAN); L 7-15	Did not advance			
Candela Espinosa	Sabre	2V-3D	4 Q	Brind'Amour (CAN); L 12-15	Did not advance			
Alicia Perroni	Sabre	1V-4D	6 Q	Chamberlain (USA); L 8-15	Did not advance			

Team

Athlete	Event	Quarterfinals	Semifinals/Consolation	Final / BM / PM	
Athlete	Event	Opposition Score	Opposition Score	Opposition Score	Rank
Jesús Lugones; Alessandro Taccani; Agustín Gusmán	Men's épée	Brazil; W 32-17	Canada; L 30-45	Bronze medal match Venezuela; W 43-42	3rd place, bronze medalist(s)
Nicolás Marino; Augusto Servello; Dante Cerquetti	Men's foil	Chile; L 43-45	Classification 5-8th Venezuela; W 45-39	Classification 5-6th Mexico; W 45-39	5
Stefano Lucchetti; Pascual Di Tella; Arturo Salgado	Men's sabre	United States; L 31-45	Classification 5-8th Chile; W 45-37	Classification 5-6th Mexico; W 45-40	5
Isabel Di Tella; Melisa Englert; Datev Nahapetyan	Women's épée	Mexico; L 36-39	Classification 5-8th Costa Rica; W 45-29	Classification 5-6th Colombia; W 45-37	5
Flavia Mormandi; Lucía Ondarts; Athina González	Women's foil	Mexico; L 33-44	Classification 5-8th Colombia; W 45-31	Classification 5-6th Chile; L 38-45	6
Candela Espinosa; Alicia Perroni; Macarena Morán	Women's sabre	Brazil; W 45-39	United States; L 13-45	Bronze medal match Mexico; L 39-45	4

== Field hockey ==
Summary

Team	Event	Group stage				Semifinal	Final / BM / Pl.	
Team	Event	Opposition Result	Opposition Result	Opposition Result	Rank	Opposition Result	Opposition Result	Rank
Argentina men	Men's tournament	Mexico; W 10-1	Chile; W 3-1	Peru; W 22-0	1 Q	United States; W 2-0	Chile; W 3-1	1st place, gold medalist(s)
Argentina women	Women's tournament	Uruguay; W 8-0	United States; W 5-1	Trinidad and Tobago; W 21-0	1 Q	Canada; W 3-0	United States; W 2-1	1st place, gold medalist(s)

=== Men's tournament ===
Argentina qualified a men's team (of 16 athletes) by winning the 2022 South American Games.

Roster

- Tomás Santiago
- Juan Catán
- Nicolás Della Torre
- Federico Monja
- Tadeo Marcucci
- Agustín Bugallo
- Thomas Habif
- Matías Rey
- Santiago Tarazona
- Lucas Toscani
- Maico Casella
- Tomás Domene
- Agustín Mazzilli
- Nicolás Keenan
- Lucas Martínez
- Agustín Machellet

Group A

Pos	Team	Pld	W	D	L	GF	GA	GD	Pts	Qualification
1	Argentina	3	3	0	0	35	2	+33	9	Semi-finals
2	Chile (H)	3	2	0	1	21	3	+18	6	Semi-finals
3	Mexico	3	1	0	2	7	16	−9	3	5th–8th classification
4	Peru	3	0	0	3	1	43	−42	0	5th–8th classification

Source: FIH
Rules for classification: 1) points; 2) matches won; 3) goal difference; 4) goals for; 5) head-to-head result; 6) field goals for.
(H) Hosts

25 October 2023
17:30

Argentina	10–1	Mexico
Domene 7', 12', 27', 48'; Mazzilli 13'; Toscani 29'; Keenan 35'; Casella 54'; Della Torre 55', 58'	Report	Guzmán 20'

Umpires:
Tyler Klenk (CAN)
Reinier Diaz (CUB)

27 October 2023
19:30

Chile	1–3	Argentina
Amoroso 60'	Report	Casella 16'; Domene 20', 48'

Umpires:
Tyler Klenk (CAN)
Benjamin Peters (USA)

29 October 2023
11:30

Argentina	22–0	Peru
Domene 3', 7', 9', 24', 27', 32', 41', 48'; Keenan 8', 24', 34'; Casella 15', 21'; Mazzilli 18'; Martínez 18', 49'; Toscani 37', 42', 44', 58'; Monja 53', 55'	Report

Umpires:
Jonathan Altamirano (MEX)
Reinier Diaz (CUB)

Semifinals

1 November 2023
18:00

Argentina	2–0	United States
Martínez 22'; Tarazona 34'	Report

Umpires:
Tyler Klenk (CAN)
Ilanggo Kanabathu (MAS)

Gold medal match

3 November 2023
19:45

(gold) Argentina	3–1	Chile (silver)
Martínez 8', 51'; Bugallo 59'	Report	Richter 45'

Umpires:
Tyler Klenk (CAN)
Ilanggo Kanabathu (MAS)

=== Women's tournament ===
Argentina qualified a women's team (of 16 athletes) by finishing second in the 2022 South American Games.

Roster

- Clara Barberi
- Agustina Gorzelany
- Cristina Cosentino
- Juana Castellaro
- Valentina Costa Biondi
- Valentina Raposo
- Victoria Sauze
- Agostina Alonso
- Sofía Toccalino
- Sofía Cairo
- Rocío Sánchez Moccia
- María José Granatto
- Delfina Thome
- Julieta Jankunas
- Eugenia Trinchinetti
- Pilar Campoy

Group A

Pos	Team	Pld	W	D	L	GF	GA	GD	Pts	Qualification
1	Argentina	3	3	0	0	34	1	+33	9	Semi-finals
2	United States	3	2	0	1	19	5	+14	6	Semi-finals
3	Uruguay	3	1	0	2	11	11	0	3	5th–8th classification
4	Trinidad and Tobago	3	0	0	3	0	47	−47	0	5th–8th classification

Source: FIH
Rules for classification: 1) points; 2) matches won; 3) goal difference; 4) goals for; 5) head-to-head result; 6) field goals for.

26 October 2023
09:30

Argentina	8–0	Uruguay
Gorzelany 8', 15'; Jankunas 27', 43'; Granatto 29', 32'; Thome 35'; Trinchinetti 55'	Report

Umpires:
Ayanna McClean (TTO)
Meghan McClennan (CAN)

28 October 2023
11:30

United States	1–5	Argentina
Grega 9'	Report	Granatto 13', 44'; Thome 22'; Gorzelany 50', 60'

Umpires:
Emi Yamada (JPN)
Ana Vázquez Escalanté (MEX)

30 October 2023
09:30

Argentina	21–0	Trinidad and Tobago
Campoy 9'; Cairó 12', 50'; Trinchinetti 17', 32'; Gorzelany 22', 23', 24', 36', 43', 58'; Raposo 27', 49'; Sauze 28'; Granatto 33', 40', 42'; Thome 40', 54'; Jankunas 43', 55'	Report

Umpires:
Victoria Pazos (ARG)
Emi Yamada (JPN)

Semifinals

2 November 2023
17:30

Argentina	3–0	Canada
Thome 26'; Jankunas 28'; Raposo 44'	Report

Umpires:
Maggie Giddens (USA)
Ana Vázquez Escalanté (MEX)

Gold medal match

4 November 2023
19:45

Argentina	2–1	United States
Gorzelany 12'; Trinchinetti 51'	Report	Sessa 30'

Umpires:
Emi Yamada (JPN)
Megan Robertson (CAN)

== Football ==
=== Women's tournament ===
Argentina qualified a women's team of 18 athletes after finishing third at the 2022 Copa América Femenina in Colombia.

Roster

- Estefanía Palomar
- Aldana Cometti
- Agostina Holzheier
- Camila Ares
- Adriana Sachs
- Daiana Falfan
- Brisa Priori
- Eliana Sabile
- Erica Lonigro
- Maricel Pereyra
- Julieta Cruz
- Laurina Oliveros
- Milagros Martín
- Miriam Mayorga
- Paulina Gramaglia
- Romina Núñez
- Sophia Braun
- Vanina Correa

Summary

Key:

- A.E.T – After extra time.
- P – Match decided by penalty-shootout.

Team	Event	Group Stage				Semifinal	Final / BM	
Team	Event	Opposition Score	Opposition Score	Opposition Score	Rank	Opposition Score	Opposition Score	Rank
Argentina women's	Women's tournament	Costa Rica; D 0-0	Bolivia; W 3-0	United States; L 0-4	2 Q	Mexico; L 0-2	Bronze medal match United States; L 0-2	4

Preliminary round

Pos	Team	Pld	W	D	L	GF	GA	GD	Pts	Qualification
1	United States	3	3	0	0	13	1	+12	9	Semi-finals
2	Argentina	3	1	1	1	3	4	−1	4	Semi-finals
3	Costa Rica	3	0	2	1	1	3	−2	2	Fifth place match
4	Bolivia	3	0	1	2	0	9	−9	1	Seventh place match

Source: Santiago2023
Rules for classification: Tie-breakers
22 October 2023
20:00

Costa Rica	0–0	Argentina
	Report

Estadio Sausalito, Viña del Mar
Referee: Priscila Vasquez (Peru)

25 October 2023
18:00

Bolivia	0–3	Argentina
	Report	Cometti 11'; Stábile 48' (pen.); Cruz 90+5'

Estadio Elías Figueroa Brander, Valparaíso
Referee: Gabriela Arce (Paraguay)

28 October 2023
13:00

United States	4–0	Argentina
Bodak 15'; Kohler 20'; Villarreal 50'; Restovich 54'	Report

Estadio Elías Figueroa Brander, Valparaíso
Referee: Andreza De Siqueira (Brazil)

Semifinals

31 October 2023
17:00

Mexico	2–0	Argentina
Ovalle 32', 89'	Report

Estadio Elías Figueroa Brander, Valparaíso
Referee: Paula Fernández (Colombia)

Bronze medal match

3 November 2023
13:00

Argentina	0–2	United States
	Report	Villarreal 30'; Hutton 37'

Estadio Elías Figueroa Brander, Valparaíso
Referee: Stefani Escobar (Venezuela)

== Golf ==
Argentina qualified a team of four golfers (two men and two women).

Athlete	Event	Round 1	Round 2	Round 3	Round 4	Total		
Athlete	Event	Score	Score	Score	Score	Score	Par	Rank
Jorge Fernández Valdés	Men's individual	75	71	67	73	286	2	19
Alejandro Tosti	Men's individual	74	69	69	68	280	8	11
Magdalena Simmermacher	Women's individual	73	71	71	72	287	1	5
Valentina Rossi	Women's individual	74	78	86	78	316	28	26

== Gymnastics ==
=== Artistic ===
Argentina qualified a team of ten gymnasts in artistic (five men and five women) at the 2023 Pan American Championships.

Men
Team & Individual Qualification

Athlete	Event	Final							
Athlete	Event	Apparatus						Total	Rank
Athlete	Event	F	PH	R	V	PB	HB	Total	Rank
Santiago Mayol	Team	14.000 Q	13.866 Q	12.266	13.800	13.400	12.700	80.032	8 Q
Daniel Villafañe	Team	12.433	~~DNS~~	14.200 Q	14.066 Q	—N/a			
Julián Jato	Team	12.833	12.166	12.366	12.866	13.233	12.966	76.430	16 Q
Luca Alfieri	Team	—N/a	13.400 Q	—N/a		12.133	13.300 Q	—N/a	
Santiago Agostinelli	Team	13.133	—N/a	13.000	13.833	12.733	12.400	—N/a	
Total	Team	39.966	39.432	39.566	41.699	39.366	38.966	238.995	4

Qualification Legend: Q = Qualified to apparatus final

Individual finals

Athlete	Event	Apparatus						Total	
Athlete	Event	F	PH	R	PB	V	HB	Score	Rank
Santiago Mayol	All-around	13.766	11.900	12.733	13.566	13.033	12.733	77.731	10
Julián Jato	All-around	13.100	11.933	12.833	13.466	13.366	12.966	77.664	12
Santiago Mayol	Floor	13.100	—N/a						4
Santiago Mayol	Pommel horse	—N/a	12.866	—N/a					8
Luca Alfieri	Pommel horse	—N/a	13.533	—N/a					6
Daniel Villafañe	Rings	—N/a		14.133	—N/a				2nd place, silver medalist(s)
Daniel Villafañe	Vault	—N/a				13.866	—N/a		5
Luca Alfieri	Horizontal bar	—N/a					13.033	—N/a	6

Women
Team & Individual Qualification

Athlete	Event	Final					
Athlete	Event	Apparatus				Total	Rank
Athlete	Event	V	UB	BB	F	Total	Rank
Nicole Iribarne	Team	12.766	12.000	12.133	11.833	48.732	12 Q
Leila Martínez	Team	12.000	11.866	11.366	10.233	45.465	25
Lucila Estarli	Team	12.033 Q	11.100	11.933	11.100	46.899	16
Meline Mesropian	Team	—N/a					
Milagros Curti	Team	12.833	11.200	11.466	12.433	47.932	13 Q
Total	Team	38.365	35.066	35.532	35.366	144.329	6

Qualification Legend: Q = Qualified to apparatus final

Individual finals

Athlete	Event	Apparatus				Total	
Athlete	Event	V	UB	BB	F	Score	Rank
Nicole Iribarne	All-around	12.666	11.900	10.600	11.933	47.099	16
Milagros Curti	All-around	12.066	11.933	12.666	12.133	48.798	11
Lucila Estarli	Vault	11.966	—N/a				7

=== Rhythmic ===
Argentina qualified two individual gymnasts.

Individual apparatus qualifications & all-around finals

Athlete	Event	Apparatus				Total	
Athlete	Event	Ball	Clubs	Hoop	Ribbon	Score	Rank
Celeste D'Arcángelo	All-around	29.450 Q	28.000 Q	30.900 Q	28.450 Q	116.800	7
Martina Gil	All-around	24.950	23.000	25.600	23.650	97.200	14

Individual finals

Athlete	Event	Apparatus				Total	
Athlete	Event	Ball	Clubs	Hoop	Ribbon	Score	Rank
Celeste D'Arcángelo	Ball	29.150	—N/a			29.150	6
Celeste D'Arcángelo	Clubs	—N/a	29.150	—N/a		29.150	4
Celeste D'Arcángelo	Hoop	—N/a		29.200	—N/a	29.200	6
Celeste D'Arcángelo	Ribbon	—N/a			29.600	29.600	5

=== Trampoline ===
Argentina qualified four gymnasts in trampoline (two men and two women) at the 2023 Pan American Championships.

Athlete	Event	Qualification		Final	
Athlete	Event	Score	Rank	Score	Rank
Santiago Ferrari	Men's individual	55.720	8 Q	56.130	3rd place, bronze medalist(s)
Tomás Roberti	Men's individual	53.320	10	Did not advance	
Santiago Ferrari; Tomás Roberti	Men's synchronized	46.590	5 Q	45.610	4
Valentina Podestá	Women's individual	49.910	9 Q	49.590	6
Lucila Maldonado	Women's individual	49.580	10	Did not advance	
Valentina Podestá; Lucila Maldonado	Women's synchronized	44.060	4 Q	42.340	4

== Handball ==
Summary

Team	Event	Group stage				Semifinal	Final / BM / Pl.	
Team	Event	Opposition Result	Opposition Result	Opposition Result	Rank	Opposition Result	Opposition Result	Rank
Argentina men	Men's tournament	United States; W 28-14	Uruguay; W 37-16	Cuba; W 28-20	1 Q	Chile; W 33-26	Brazil; W 32-25	1st place, gold medalist(s)
Argentina women	Women's tournament	Puerto Rico; W 46-17	Chile; W 28-15	Canada; W 31-10	1 Q	Paraguay; W 28-18	Brazil; L 18-30	2nd place, silver medalist(s)

=== Men's tournament ===
Argentina qualified a men's team (of 14 athletes) by winning the 2022 South American Games.

Roster

- Diego Simonet
- Federico Pizarro
- Federico Fernández
- Gastón Mouriño
- Ignacio Pizarro
- Juan Manuel Bar
- Leonel Maciel
- Lucas Moscariello
- Nicolás Bono
- Nicolás Bonanno
- Pablo Vainstein
- Pablo Simonet
- Pedro Martínez
- Santiago Baronetto

Group B

Pos	Team	Pld	W	D	L	GF	GA	GD	Pts	Qualification
1	Argentina	3	3	0	0	93	50	+43	6	Semifinals
2	United States	3	2	0	1	78	86	−8	4	Semifinals
3	Uruguay	3	1	0	2	71	95	−24	2	5–8th place semifinals
4	Cuba	3	0	0	3	72	83	−11	0	5–8th place semifinals

Source: Santiago 2023
Rules for classification: 1) points; 2) head-to-head points; 3) head-to-head goal difference; 4) head-to-head goals scored; 5) goal difference; 6) goals scored; 7) draw.

30 October 2023; 12:30	Argentina	28–14	United States	Gimnasio Polideportivo de Viña del Mar; Referees: Sosa, Lemes (URU)
30 October 2023; 12:30	F. Pizarro 5	(11–10)	Corning, Fofana 4	Gimnasio Polideportivo de Viña del Mar; Referees: Sosa, Lemes (URU)
30 October 2023; 12:30	1× (yellow card) 4× (suspension)	Report	1× (yellow card) 4× (suspension)	Gimnasio Polideportivo de Viña del Mar; Referees: Sosa, Lemes (URU)

31 October 2023; 12:30	Uruguay	16–37	Argentina	Gimnasio Polideportivo de Viña del Mar; Referees: Magalhães, Godoy (BRA)
31 October 2023; 12:30	Cancio 5	(7–19)	F. Pizarro 9	Gimnasio Polideportivo de Viña del Mar; Referees: Magalhães, Godoy (BRA)
31 October 2023; 12:30		Report	1× (yellow card) 3× (suspension)	Gimnasio Polideportivo de Viña del Mar; Referees: Magalhães, Godoy (BRA)

1 November 2023; 12:30	Argentina	28–20	Cuba	Gimnasio Polideportivo de Viña del Mar; Referees: Araújo, Perdomo (URU)
1 November 2023; 12:30	F. Pizarro 7	(14–9)	Vázquez 4	Gimnasio Polideportivo de Viña del Mar; Referees: Araújo, Perdomo (URU)
1 November 2023; 12:30	1× (yellow card) 2× (suspension)	Report	1× (yellow card) 2× (suspension) 1× (red card)	Gimnasio Polideportivo de Viña del Mar; Referees: Araújo, Perdomo (URU)

Semifinals

3 November 2023; 20:00	Argentina	33–26	Chile	Gimnasio Polideportivo de Viña del Mar; Referees: Hansen, Madsen (DEN)
3 November 2023; 20:00	F. Pizarro 8	(17–13)	Er. Feuchtmann 9	Gimnasio Polideportivo de Viña del Mar; Referees: Hansen, Madsen (DEN)
3 November 2023; 20:00	5× (suspension) 2× (red card)	Report	1× (yellow card) 2× (suspension)	Gimnasio Polideportivo de Viña del Mar; Referees: Hansen, Madsen (DEN)

Gold medal match

4 November 2023; 19:30	Brazil	25–32	Argentina	Gimnasio Polideportivo de Viña del Mar; Referees: Hansen, Madsen (DEN)
4 November 2023; 19:30	Dupoux 6	(14–16)	Bono 6	Gimnasio Polideportivo de Viña del Mar; Referees: Hansen, Madsen (DEN)
4 November 2023; 19:30	3× (suspension) 1× (red card)	Report	4× (yellow card) 1× (suspension) 1× (red card)	Gimnasio Polideportivo de Viña del Mar; Referees: Hansen, Madsen (DEN)

=== Women's tournament ===
Argentina qualified a women's team (of 14 athletes) by winning the 2021 Junior Pan American Games.

Roster

- Carolina Bono
- Elke Karsten
- Fátima Rosalez
- Giuliana Gavilán
- Graciela García
- Lucía Crode
- Luciana Mendoza
- Macarena Gandulfo
- Malena Cavo
- Manuela Pizzo
- Marisol Carratu
- Martina Romero
- Micaela Casasola
- Rocío Campigli

Group A

Pos	Team	Pld	W	D	L	GF	GA	GD	Pts	Qualification
1	Argentina	3	3	0	0	105	42	+63	6	Semifinals
2	Chile (H)	3	2	0	1	61	57	+4	4	Semifinals
3	Puerto Rico	3	1	0	2	57	89	−32	2	5–8th place semifinals
4	Canada	3	0	0	3	44	79	−35	0	5–8th place semifinals

Source: Santiago 2023
Rules for classification: 1) points; 2) head-to-head points; 3) head-to-head goal difference; 4) head-to-head goals scored; 5) goal difference; 6) goals scored; 7) draw.
(H) Hosts

24 October 2023; 17:30	Argentina	46–17	Puerto Rico	Gimnasio Polideportivo de Viña del Mar; Referees: Corrêa, Corrêa (BRA)
24 October 2023; 17:30	Dalle Crode, Karsten 7	(21–9)	three players 3	Gimnasio Polideportivo de Viña del Mar; Referees: Corrêa, Corrêa (BRA)
24 October 2023; 17:30	2× (suspension)	Report	5× (suspension) 1× (red card)	Gimnasio Polideportivo de Viña del Mar; Referees: Corrêa, Corrêa (BRA)

25 October 2023; 17:30	Chile	15–28	Argentina	Gimnasio Polideportivo de Viña del Mar; Referees: Sosa, Lemes (URU)
25 October 2023; 17:30	Lovera 5	(9–16)	Karsten 7	Gimnasio Polideportivo de Viña del Mar; Referees: Sosa, Lemes (URU)
25 October 2023; 17:30	2× (suspension)	Report	1× (yellow card) 4× (suspension)	Gimnasio Polideportivo de Viña del Mar; Referees: Sosa, Lemes (URU)

26 October 2023; 17:30	Argentina	31–10	Canada	Gimnasio Polideportivo de Viña del Mar; Referees: Aguilera, Gutiérrez (CHI)
26 October 2023; 17:30	Karsten 10	(15–4)	Laplante 3	Gimnasio Polideportivo de Viña del Mar; Referees: Aguilera, Gutiérrez (CHI)
26 October 2023; 17:30	1× (suspension)	Report	6× (suspension)	Gimnasio Polideportivo de Viña del Mar; Referees: Aguilera, Gutiérrez (CHI)

Semifinals

28 October 2023; 17:30	Argentina	28–18	Paraguay	Gimnasio Polideportivo de Viña del Mar; Referees: Reyes, Zuñiga (CUB)
28 October 2023; 17:30	three players 5	(10–7)	Fernández 6	Gimnasio Polideportivo de Viña del Mar; Referees: Reyes, Zuñiga (CUB)
28 October 2023; 17:30	3× (suspension)	Report	5× (suspension) 1× (red card)	Gimnasio Polideportivo de Viña del Mar; Referees: Reyes, Zuñiga (CUB)

Gold medal match

29 October 2023; 20:30	Argentina	18–30	Brazil	Gimnasio Polideportivo de Viña del Mar; Referees: Sosa, Lemes (URU)
29 October 2023; 20:30	Pizzo 6	(7–16)	da Rocha 7	Gimnasio Polideportivo de Viña del Mar; Referees: Sosa, Lemes (URU)
29 October 2023; 20:30	1× (yellow card) 3× (suspension) 1× (red card)	Report	1× (yellow card) 5× (suspension)	Gimnasio Polideportivo de Viña del Mar; Referees: Sosa, Lemes (URU)

== Judo ==
Argentina has qualified 10 judokas (five men and five women).

Men

Athlete	Event	Round of 16	Quarterfinals	Semifinals	Repechage	Final / BM	
Athlete	Event	Opposition Result	Opposition Result	Opposition Result	Opposition Result	Opposition Result	Rank
Joaquín Tovagliari	−66 kg	Garcia (VEN); L 00-10	Did not advance				
Matteo Etchechury	−73 kg	Cargnin (BRA); L 00-10	Did not advance				
Tomás Morales	−81 kg	Bye	Del Orbe (DOM); L 01-11	Did not advance	Popovici (CAN); L 00-01	Did not advance	
Mariano Coto	−90 kg	Torres (MEX); W 10-00	Paz (COL); W 10-00	Silva (CUB); L 00-11	Bye	Bronze medal match Knauf (USA); L 00-10	4
Ivo Dargoltz	−100 kg	Keeve (USA); L 00-10	Did not advance				

Women

Athlete	Event	Round of 16	Quarterfinals	Semifinals	Repechage	Final / BM	
Athlete	Event	Opposition Result	Opposition Result	Opposition Result	Opposition Result	Opposition Result	Rank
Keisy Perafan	−48 kg	Bye	Vilhalba (BRA); L 00-10	Did not advance	Vargas (CHI); L 00-10	Did not advance	
Agustina Lahiton	−52 kg	Bye	Delgado (USA); L 00-10	Did not advance	González (CHI); L 00-11	Did not advance	
Brisa Gómez	−57 kg	Bye	Ortiz (MEX); W 10-00	Rosa (DOM); W 10-00	Bye	Silva (BRA); L 00-10	2nd place, silver medalist(s)
Agustina De Lucía	−63 kg	Bye	Pérez (CHI); W 10-00	Del Toro (CUB); L 00-10	Bye	Bronze medal match Awiti (MEX); L 00-10	4
Victoria Delvecchio	−70 kg	Lagos (CHI); W 10-00	Gómez (CUB); L 00-11	Did not advance	Oliveira (BRA); L 00-10	Did not advance	

Mixed

Athlete	Event	Round of 16	Quarterfinal	Semifinal	Repechage	Final / BM	
Athlete	Event	Opposition Result	Opposition Result	Opposition Result	Opposition Result	Opposition Result	Rank
Victoria Delvecchio; Agustina De Lucía; Brisa Gómez; Agustina Lahiton; Mariano Coto; Ivo Dargoltz; Matteo Etchechury; Agustín Gil; Tomás Morales; Joaquín Tovagliari	Team	Bye	Colombia; L 0-4	Did not advance	Venezuela; W 4-2	Bronze medal match Dominican Republic; L 1-4	4

== Karate ==
Argentina qualified a team of 6 karatekas (three men and three women) at the 2022 South American Games.

Kumite

Athlete	Event	Round robin					Semifinal	Final	
Athlete	Event	Opposition Result	Opposition Result	Opposition Result	Opposition Result	Rank	Opposition Result	Opposition Result	Rank
Gonzalo Navarro	Men's −67 kg	Velozo (CHI); L 1-4	Proaño (ECU); L 2-3	Ramírez (COL); L 2-5	Gálvez (PAN); L 0-2	5	Did not advance		
Marcos Molina	Men's +84 kg	Miranda (BRA); L 0-9	Rojas (CHI); L 0-9	Irr (USA); L 3-10	Castillo (DOM); L 0-5	5	Did not advance		
Yamila Benítez	Women's −50 kg	Morales (EAI); W 2–2 (senshu)	de la Cruz (PER); L 1–2	Izaguirre (ESA); W 9–0	Delgado (USA); W 1-0	1 Q	Lahyanssa (CAN); L 0-0 (hantei)	Did not advance	3rd place, bronze medalist(s)
Mickaela Novak	Women's −55 kg	Servin (PAR); L 3-10	Toro (CHI); L 4-6	Furumoto (CAN); W 0-0 (kiken)	Peña (COL); W 4-2	3	Did not advance		
Laura Díaz	Women's -61 kg	Ramírez (COL); L 0-3	Chacón (CUB); W 3-0	Garcés (VEN); L 1-7	Wong (EAI); L 3-5	4	Did not advance		

Kata

Athlete	Event	Round robin					Semifinal	Final
Athlete	Event	Opposition Result	Opposition Result	Opposition Result	Rank	Opposition Result	Opposition Result	Rank
Luca Impagnatiello	Men's individual	Torres (USA); L 39.50-41.60	Tepal (MEX); W 38.40–37.90	Aracena (DOM); L 40.10-40.30	3 Q	—N/a	Bronze medal match Wong (PER); W 40.20-39.30	3rd place, bronze medalist(s)

== Modern pentathlon ==
Argentina qualified six modern pentathletes (three men and three women).

Athlete	Event	Fencing (Épée one touch)				Swimming (200 m freestyle)			Riding (Show jumping)			Shooting / Running (10 m laser pistol / 3000 m cross-country)			Total	
Athlete	Event	V – D	Rank	MP points	BP	Time	Rank	MP points	Penalties	Rank	MP points	Time	Rank	MP points	MP points	Rank
Franco Serrano	Men's individual	23-7	2	266	2	2:09.72	6	291	1:05.00	7	278	11:17.70	5	644	1479	5
Sergio Villamayor	Men's individual	18-12	7	240	2	2:21.13	18	268	0:55.03	13	293	11:35.10	9	660	1461	9
Emanuel Zapata	Men's individual	17-13	10	230	4	2:17.71	10	275	Did not advance			11:45	14	595	1100	20
Franco Serrano; Sergio Villamayor	Men's relay	16-24	10	206	4	2:01.53	8	307	2:24.00	5	252	12:46.30	5	592	1357	5
Camila Fuenzalida	Women's individual	15-17	15	210	2	2:32.32	10	246	Did not advance			13:28.90	14	582	1038	14
María Belén Serrano	Women's individual	20-12	7	238	2	2:33.78	11	243	Did not advance			14:43.80	15	507	988	15
Martina Armanazqui	Women's individual	16-16	19	214	2	~~DNS~~			Did not advance			~~DNS~~			218	33
Camila Fuenzalida; María Belén Serrano	Women's relay	22-14	3	239	4	2:15.88	4	279	Did not advance			15:48.20	5	442	960	5
Camila Fuenzalida; Vicente Maciel	Mixed relay	21-23	8	220	10	Did not advance			2:22.00	5	223	15:43.00	12	447	890	12

== Racquetball ==
Argentina qualified five racquetball athletes (two men and three women).

Athlete	Event	Round of 32	Round of 16	Quarterfinal	Semifinal	Final	
Athlete	Event	Opposition Result	Opposition Result	Opposition Result	Opposition Result	Opposition Result	Rank
Diego García	Men's singles	Bye	Manilla (USA); L 2-3	Did not advance			
Fernando Kurzbard	Men's singles	Bye	de la Rosa (USA); L 0-3	Did not advance			
Diego García; Fernando Kurzbard	Men's doubles	—N/a	Espinosa / Moyet (CUB); W 3-0	Montoya / Mar (MEX); L 0-3	Did not advance		
Diego García; Fernando Kurzbard	Men's team	—N/a	Chile; W 2-1	Bolivia; L 0-2	Did not advance		
María José Vargas	Women's singles	Bye	Muñoz (CHI); W 3-2	Martinez (EAI); W 3-0	Longoria (MEX); L 1-3	Did not advance	3rd place, bronze medalist(s)
Natalia Méndez	Women's singles	Bye	Lambert (CAN); W 3-1	Ortiz (CRC); L 2-3	Did not advance		
María José Vargas; Natalia Méndez	Women's doubles	—N/a	Bye	Manilla / Key (USA); W 3-1	Mejia / Herrera (MEX); W 3-2	Martinez / Rodriguez (EAI); L 1-3	2nd place, silver medalist(s)
María José Vargas; Natalia Méndez	Women's team	—N/a	Bye	Dominican Republic; W 2-0	Independent Athletes Team; W 2-0	Mexico; L 2-3	2nd place, silver medalist(s)
Diego García; María José Vargas	Mixed doubles	—N/a	Bye	Sotomayor / Ugalde (ECU); W 3-0	Moscoso / Barrios (BOL); W 3-2	A Manilla / E Manilla (USA); L 0-3	2nd place, silver medalist(s)

== Roller sports ==
=== Figure ===
Argentina qualified a team of two athletes in figure skating (one man and one woman).

Athlete	Event	Short program		Long program		Total	
Athlete	Event	Score	Rank	Score	Rank	Score	Rank
Donato Mastroianni	Men's	66.31	2	116.09	1	182.40	2nd place, silver medalist(s)
Martina Della Chiesa	Women's	51.88	2	69.92	3	121.80	3rd place, bronze medalist(s)

=== Speed ===
Men

Athlete	Event	Preliminary		Semifinal		Final	
Athlete	Event	Time	Rank	Time	Rank	Time	Rank
Nahuel Quevedo	200 m time trial	—N/a				18.075	5
Nahuel Quevedo	500 m + distance	43.777	7 Q	~~DQ~~		Did not advance	
Ken Kuwada	1000 m sprint	1:24.177	3 Q	—N/a		1:24.780	4
Ken Kuwada	10,000 m elimination	—N/a				Eliminated	

Women

Athlete	Event	Preliminary		Semifinal		Final	
Athlete	Event	Time	Rank	Time	Rank	Time	Rank
Aylén Tuya	200 m time trial	—N/a				19.572	9
Aylén Tuya	500 m + distance	47.156	9	Did not advance			
Rocío Alt	1000 m sprint	1:29.097	5 Q	—N/a		1:29.889	5
Rocío Alt	10,000 m elimination	—N/a				Eliminated	

=== Skateboarding ===
Argentina qualified a team of four athletes (two men and two women) in skateboarding.

Men

Athlete	Event	Final	
Athlete	Event	Score	Rank
Omar Cocilova	Park	72.35	6
Matías Dell Olio	Street	215.98	5

Women

Athlete	Event	Final	
Athlete	Event	Score	Rank
Ailin Arzua	Park	48.26	7
Aldana Bertran	Street	102.49	7

== Rowing ==
Argentina qualified a team of 21 athletes (ten men, ten women and one coxswain).

Men

Athlete	Event	Heat		Repechage		Semifinal		Final A/B	
Athlete	Event	Time	Rank	Time	Rank	Time	Rank	Time	Rank
Agustín Scenna; Axel Haack	Double sculls	6:49.28	1 SA/B	Bye		6:41.81	3 FA	6:30.04	4
Joaquín Riveros; Martín Mansilla; Emiliano Calderón; Santiago Deandrea	Quadruple sculls	—N/a						6:48.37	5
Ignacio Pacheco; Joel Romero	Pair	6:59.86	1 FA	Bye		—N/a		6:44.77	5
Joaquín Riveros; Ignacio Pacheco; Joel Romero; Santiago Deandrea	Four	—N/a						6:08.28	4
Alejandro Colomino; Pedro Dickson	Lightweight Double sculls	6:29.68	3 R	6:43.80	2 FA	—N/a		6:27.26	3rd place, bronze medalist(s)
Joaquín Riveros; Martín Mansilla; Emiliano Calderón; Santiago Deandrea; Agustín Scenna; Ignacio Pacheco; Joel Romero; Axel Haack; Joel Infante	Eight	—N/a						5:48.48	5

Women

Athlete	Event	Heat		Repechage		Semifinal		Final A/B	
Athlete	Event	Time	Rank	Time	Rank	Time	Rank	Time	Rank
Clara Galfre; Oriana Ruiz	Double sculls	7:39.96	4 R	7:20.99	1 FA	—N/a		7:18.17	4
Clara Galfre; Oriana Ruiz; Catalina Deandrea; Flavia Chanampa	Quadruple sculls	—N/a						7:56.92	6
Olivia Peralta; Ingrid Marcipar	Pair	7:47.54	4 R	7:30.49	2 FA	—N/a		7:29.29	5
Oriana Ruiz; Olivia Peralta; Ingrid Marcipar; Flavia Chanampa	Four	—N/a						8:21.51	6
Sonia Baluzzo; Evelyn Silvestro	Lightweight Double sculls	7:19.55	1 FA	Bye		—N/a		7:15.27	3rd place, bronze medalist(s)
Catalina Deandrea; Clara Galfre; Flavia Chanampa; Oriana Ruiz; Ingrid Marcipar; Olivia Peralta; Sonia Baluzzo; Evelyn Silvestro	Eight	—N/a						6:26.78	4

Mixed

Athlete	Event	Heat		Repechage		Final A/B	
Athlete	Event	Time	Rank	Time	Rank	Time	Rank
Oriana Ruiz; Clara Galfre; Ingrid Marcipar; Olivia Peralta; Joaquín Riveros; Martín Mansilla; Emiliano Calderón; Santiago Deandrea; Joel Infante	Eight	6:19.36	2 R	6:06.08	3 FA	6:10.84	6

Qualification Legend: FA=Final A (medal); FB=Final B (non-medal); SA/B=Semifinals A/B; R=Repechage

== Rugby sevens ==
Argentina qualified a men's team (of 12 athletes) after winning the 2022 South American Games.

Roster

- Santiago Alvarez Fourcade
- Agustín Fraga
- Luciano González
- Matteo Graziano
- Alejo Lavayén
- Santiago Mare
- Marcos Moneta
- Matías Osadczuk
- Joaquín Pellandini
- Gastón Revol
- German Schulz
- Santiago Vera Feld

Summary

Team	Event	Group stage				Semifinal	Final / BM / Pl.	
Team	Event	Opposition Result	Opposition Result	Opposition Result	Rank	Opposition Result	Opposition Result	Rank
Argentina men	Men's tournament	Jamaica; W 40-7	Chile; W 28-12	Uruguay; W 35-5	1 Q	Canada; W 21-7	Chile; W 24-5	1st place, gold medalist(s)

== Sailing ==
Argentina qualified 13 boats for a total of 19 sailors.

Men

Athlete	Event	Opening series																		Finals				
Athlete	Event	1	2	3	4	5	6	7	8	9	10	11	12	13	14	15	16	Points	Rank	QF	SF	M / F	Points	Rank
Marcos Quiroga	IQFoil	9	~~11~~; ~~DNF~~	9	9	8	7	6	6	~~11~~; ~~UFD~~	7	9	6	11; UFD	6	5	3	90	8 Q	5	Did not advance			
Francisco Saubidet	IQFoil	5	4	4	4	4	4	5	5	2	4	~~8~~	1	~~11~~; ~~UFD~~	6	~~7~~	7	54	5 Q	2 Q	3	Did not advance		
Francisco Rigonat	Laser	~~8~~	6	6	3	1	1	7	4	8	6	—N/a						42	5 Q	—N/a		2	44	4
Massimo Contessi; Luca Contessi	49er	7	3	7	5	4	3	~~9~~; ~~OCS~~	8	5	5	6	7	—N/a				60	7	—N/a		Did not advance		
Raúl Aguilar	Kites	7	~~8~~	~~8~~	7	8	6	7	8	8	8	7	~~10~~; ~~DNF~~	8	6	5	7	92	8 Q	—N/a		8	92	8

Women

Athlete	Event	Opening series																		Finals				
Athlete	Event	1	2	3	4	5	6	7	8	9	10	11	12	13	14	15	16	Points	Rank	QF	SF	M / F	Points	Rank
Chiara Ferretti	IQFoil	6	6	5	6	~~11~~; ~~DNF~~	5	~~7~~	6	6	7	5	4	7	4	4	4	68	6 Q	2 Q	3	Did not advance		
Luciana Cardozo	Laser radial	3	3	3	4	3	5	5	2	~~6~~	1	—N/a						29	3 Q	—N/a		6	35	3rd place, bronze medalist(s)
María Sol Branz; Julia Pantin	49erFX	4	4	4	2	~~5~~	4	4	4	4	4	3	4	—N/a				41	4 Q	—N/a		8	49	4
Sofía D'Agostino	Sunfish	6	5	4	3	3	5	4	~~9~~	5	5	—N/a						40	4 Q	—N/a		4	44	4
Catalina Turienzo	Kites	2	2	1	1	~~4~~	2	3	2	2	2	~~4~~	2	~~6~~	2	2	2	25	2 Q	—N/a		2	25	2nd place, silver medalist(s)

Mixed

Athlete	Event	Race													Total	
Athlete	Event	1	2	3	4	5	6	7	8	9	10	11	12	M	Points	Rank
Julio Alsogaray; Malena Sciarra	Snipe	1	1	4	~~5~~	4	2	2	3	2	3	—N/a		4	26	1st place, gold medalist(s)
Martina María Silva; Javier Conte; María Trinidad Silva	Lightning	1	4	~~6~~	5	4	3	2	2	2	4	—N/a		6	33	3rd place, bronze medalist(s)
Mateo Majdalani; Eugenia Bosco	Nacra 17	1	1	1	1	1	1	1	~~2~~	1	1	1	1	2	13	1st place, gold medalist(s)

== Shooting ==
Argentina qualified a total of 10 shooters in the 2022 Americas Shooting Championships. Argentina also qualified four shooters during the 2022 South American Games.

Men

Athlete	Event	Qualification		Final	
Athlete	Event	Points	Rank	Points	Rank
Juan Manuel Fragueiro	10 m air pistol	565	13	Did not advance	
Iván Cruz	10 m air pistol	551	31	Did not advance	
Iván Cruz	25 m rapid fire pistol	249	22	Did not advance	
Julián Gutiérrez	10 m air rifle	624.9	3 Q	141.9	7
Alexis Eberhadt	10 m air rifle	623.0	6 Q	164.0	6
Alexis Eberhadt	50 metre rifle three positions	576	7 Q	414.0	5
Marcelo Zoccali	50 metre rifle three positions	571	15	Did not advance	
Joaquín Cisneros	Trap	113	9	Did not advance	
Fernando Vidal Sanz	Trap	108	18	Did not advance	
Federico Gil	Skeet	122	3 Q	55	2nd place, silver medalist(s)
Cesario González	Skeet	108	23	Did not advance	

Women

Athlete	Event	Qualification		Final	
Athlete	Event	Points	Rank	Points	Rank
Laura Ramos	10 m air pistol	573	2 Q	129.7	7
Laura Ramos	25 m pistol	551	20	Did not advance	
Fernanda Russo	10 m air rifle	624.3	5 Q	248.0	2nd place, silver medalist(s)
Lola Sánchez	10 m air rifle	613.0	18	Did not advance	
Sofía Lamarque	50 metre rifle three positions	569	13	Did not advance	
Amelia Fournel	50 metre rifle three positions	571	12	Did not advance	

Mixed

Athlete	Event	Qualification		Final / BM	
Athlete	Event	Points	Rank	Opposition Result	Rank
Juan Manuel Fragueiro; Laura Ramos	10 m air pistol team	567	5	Did not advance	
Lola Sánchez; Julián Gutiérrez	10 m air rifle team	619.5	5	Did not advance	
Fernanda Russo; Alexis Eberhardt	10 m air rifle team	619.0	6	Did not advance	

== Sport climbing ==
Argentina qualified a team of 6 climbers (three men and three women) by virtue of their IFSC world rankings.

Speed

Athlete	Event	Qualification			Round of 16	Quarterfinal	Semifinal	Final / BM	
Athlete	Event	Lane A	Lane B	Rank	Opposition Result	Opposition Result	Opposition Result	Opposition Result	Rank
Valentín Sternik	Men's	~~6.95~~	6.76	12	Finn-Henry (CAN); W 6.86–7.20	Flynn-Pitcher (CAN); L 9.19–5.66	Did not advance		

Boulder & lead

Athlete	Event	Qualification						Final					
Athlete	Event	Bouldering		Lead		Total		Bouldering		Lead		Total	
Athlete	Event	Points	Rank	Points	Rank	Points	Rank	Points	Rank	Points	Rank	Points	Rank
Alejo Suter	Men's	39.8	19	33	17	72.8	18	Did not advance					
Lautaro Soria	Men's	64.4	12	33.1	15	97.5	14	Did not advance					
Valentina Aguado	Women's	64.6	7	26.1	8	90.7	7 Q	34.8	5	54	7	88.8	6
Rocío Becerra	Women's	24.6	18	26.1	8	50.7	17	Did not advance					
Zoe García	Women's	59.6	11	22	16	81.6	11	Did not advance					

== Squash ==
Argentina qualified a male team of 3 athletes through the 2022 South American Games.

Men

Athlete	Event	Round of 16	Quarterfinal	Semifinal	Final / BM	
Athlete	Event	Opposition Result	Opposition Result	Opposition Result	Opposition Result	Rank
Jeremías Azaña	Singles	Baillargeon (CAN); L 1-3	Did not advance			
Leandro Romiglio	Singles	Escudero (PER); W 3-0	Rodríguez (COL); L 0-3	Did not advance		
Leandro Romiglio; Robertino Pezzota	Doubles	—N/a	Elías / Escudero (PER); L 1-2	Did not advance		
Jeremías Azaña; Leandro Romiglio; Robertino Pezzota	Team	—N/a	Mexico; W 2-0	Peru; W 2-1	Colombia; L 0-2	2nd place, silver medalist(s)

== Swimming ==
Key

- Note – Ranks given are for the entire round
- NR – National record
- QA – Qualified for Final A
- QB – Qualified for Final B

Men

Athlete	Event	Heat		Final	
Athlete	Event	Time	Rank	Time	Rank
Guido Buscaglia	50 m freestyle	22.58	9 QB	22.39	7
Matías Santiso	50 m freestyle	23.02	16 QB	22.97	14
Guido Buscaglia	100 m freestyle	49.65	10 QB	49.93	11
Matías Santiso	100 m freestyle	49.68	11 Q	49.99	12
Ivo Cassini	800 m freestyle	—N/a		8:12.32	10
Lucas Alba	800 m freestyle	—N/a		8:15.72	11
Gian Turco	1500 m freestyle	—N/a		15:47.95	11
Lucas Alba	1500 m freestyle	—N/a		15:33.32	6
Agustín Hernández	100 m backstroke	56.78	17	56.53	13
Ulises Saravia	100 m backstroke	55.07	5 QA	54.23	2nd place, silver medalist(s)
Tomás di Paolo	200 m backstroke	2:04.86	10 QB	2:04.00	11
Valentín Constantino	200 m backstroke	2:05.66	12 QB	2:03.93	10
Gabriel Morelli	100 m breaststroke	1:03.08	14 QB	1:02.20	12
Juan Carrocia	100 m breaststroke	1:03.20	15 QB	1:05.03	16
Gabriel Morelli	200 m breaststroke	2:17.31	12 QB	2:17.64	13
Juan Carrocia	200 m breaststroke	2:21.39	17	Did not advance	
Federico Ludueña	200 m butterfly	2:01.90	12 QB	2:03.81	12
Joaquín Piñero	200 m butterfly	2:00.53	7 QA	2:00.00	7
Joaquín Piñero	200 m individual medley	2:03.05	8 QA	2:03.63	8
Joaquín Piñero	400 m individual medley	4:29.02	11 QB	4:28.47	11
Ivo Cassini	10 km open water	—N/a		1:50:23.6	2nd place, silver medalist(s)
Joaquín Moreno	10 km open water	—N/a		1:50:34.4	5
Guido Buscaglia; Joaquín Piñero; Matías Santiso; Ulises Saravia	4 × 100 m freestyle relay	3:23.64	6 QA	3:22.34	6
Guido Buscaglia; Joaquín Piñero; Juan Carrocia; Ulises Saravia	4 × 100 m medley relay	3:46.72	6 QA	3:41.71	6

Women

Athlete	Event	Heat		Final	
Athlete	Event	Time	Rank	Time	Rank
Andrea Berrino	50 m freestyle	25.64	8 QA	25.98	8
Lucía Gauna	100 m freestyle	57.89	19	Did not advance	
Guillemina Ruggiero	100 m freestyle	58.08	21	Did not advance	
Lucía Gauna	200 m freestyle	2:04.02	13 QB	2:05.24	12
Agostina Hein	400 m freestyle	4:15.39	5 QA	4:15.26	6
Delfina Dini	400 m freestyle	4:16.26	7 QA	4:17.55	7
Agostina Hein	800 m freestyle	—N/a		8:39.72	5
Delfina Dini	800 m freestyle	—N/a		8:47.78	6
Agostina Hein	1500 m freestyle	—N/a		16:35.63	5
Malena Santillán	1500 m freestyle	—N/a		16:47.71	7
Andrea Berrino	100 m backstroke	1:02.53	9 QB	1:03.21	12
Candela Raviola	200 m backstroke	2:19.63	14 QB	2:19.69	11
Malena Santillán	200 m backstroke	2:17.68	8 QA	2:16.40	6
Julia Sebastián	100 m breaststroke	1:10.64	10 QB	1:10.69	12
Macarena Ceballos	100 m breaststroke	1:08.12	2 QA	1:07.68	3rd place, bronze medalist(s)
Martina Barbeito	100 m breaststroke	1:10.29	8 QA	1:10.91	8
Macarena Ceballos	200 m breaststroke	2:29.19	4 QA	2:26.70	4
Martina Barbeito	200 m breaststroke	2:37.10	12 QB	2:33.97	11
Valentina Marcantonio	200 m breaststroke	2:40.82	16 QB	2:39.33	15
Florencia Perotti	200 m individual medley	2:21.67	11 QB	2:23.19	14
Magdalena Portela	200 m individual medley	2:22.37	12 QB	2:19.38	10
Florencia Perotti	400 m individual medley	4:58.83	7 QA	5:01.01	8
Magdalena Portela	400 m individual medley	5:02.32	10 QB	4:55.61	9
Selene Alborzen	400 m individual medley	4:56.18	6 QA	4:54.67	6
Cecilia Biagioli	10 km open water	—N/a		1:58:09.7	4
Candela Giordanino	10 km open water	—N/a		2:01:43.3	7
Andrea Berrino; Lucía Gauna; Macarena Ceballos; Guillermina Ruggiero	4 × 100 m freestyle relay	3:49.02	6 QA	3:47.84	6
Agostina Hein; Lucía Gauna; Magdalena Portela; Malena Santillán	4 × 200 m freestyle relay	8:31.88	7 QA	—N/a	
Agostina Hein; Andrea Berrino; Lucía Gauna; Macarena Ceballos	4 × 100 m medley relay	4:13.97	7 QA	4:07.70	6

Mixed

Athlete	Event	Heat		Final	
Athlete	Event	Time	Rank	Time	Rank
Guido Buscaglia; Lucía Gauna; Guillermina Ruggiero; Matías Santiso	4 × 100 m freestyle relay	3:38.60	6 QA	3:31.24	5
Joaquín Piñero; Lucía Gauna; Macarena Ceballos; Ulises Saravia	4 × 100 m medley relay	—N/a		3:52.84	5

== Surfing ==
Argentina qualified nine surfers (five men and four women).

Artistic

Athlete	Event	Round 1	Round 2	Round 3	Round 4	Repechage 1	Repechage 2	Repechage 3	Repechage 4	Repechage 5	Bronze medal	Final	
Athlete	Event	Opposition Result	Opposition Result	Opposition Result	Opposition Result	Opposition Result	Opposition Result	Opposition Result	Opposition Result	Opposition Result	Opposition Result	Opposition Result	Rank
Leandro Usuna	Men's Shortboard	Radziunas (ARG); W 15.83-7.33	Mesinas (PER); L 5.60-10.66	Did not advance		Bye	Satt (CHI); W 10.96-9.90	Kymerson (BRA); L 9.00-13.86	Did not advance				
Franco Radziunas	Men's Shortboard	Usuna (ARG); L 7.33-15.83	Did not advance			Satt (CHI); L 5.84-10.53	Did not advance						
Lucía Indurain	Women's Shortboard	Dempfle-Olin (CAN); L 7.03-9.26	Did not advance			Anderson (CHI); W 12.60-9.43	Dempfle-Olin (CAN); L 9.00-15.96	Did not advance					
Ornella Pellizzari	Women's Shortboard	Resano (NCA); L 6.77-11.50	Did not advance			Barona (ECU); W 6.80-1.80	Resano (NCA); L 4.77-8.00	Did not advance					
Franco Faccín	Men's stand up paddleboard	Torres (PUR); Schweitzer (USA); L 8.03	Did not advance			Salazar (CHI); Aviles (CRC); W 9.60	Spencer (CAN); L 7.30-12.64	Did not advance					
Lucía Cosoleto	Women's stand up paddleboard	Lagos (CHI); Bruhwiler (CAN); W 13.33	Bowen (ECU); Gómez (COL); W 11.50	Adisaka (BRA); L 8.17-8.43	Did not advance	Bye		Bowen (ECU); W 7.73-6.87	Torres (PER); L 5.33-8.77	Did not advance			
Martín Pérez	Men's Longboard	Robbins (USA); Alvaro (ESA); W 9.94	Bahia (BRA); Cortéz (CHI); L 7.67	Did not advance		Bye	Alvarado (ESA); L 7.23-10.66	Did not advance					
Agostina Pellizzari	Women's Longboard	Reyes (PER); Reyes (CRC); W 6.73	Calmon (BRA); Stokes (CAN); W 6.40	Reyes (PER); L 1.10-8.90	Did not advance	Bye		Reyes (CRC); L 4.50-6.40	Did not advance				

Race

Athlete	Event	Time	Rank
Santino Basaldella	Men's stand up paddleboard	13:59.4	3rd place, bronze medalist(s)
Juliana González	Women's stand up paddleboard	18:14.6	5

== Table tennis ==
Argentina qualified a full team of six athletes (three men and three women) through the 2022 South American Games.

Men

Athlete	Event	Group stage			First round	Second round	Quarterfinal	Semifinal	Final / BM	
Athlete	Event	Opposition Result	Opposition Result	Rank	Opposition Result	Opposition Result	Opposition Result	Opposition Result	Opposition Result	Rank
Gastón Alto	Singles	—N/a			Tapia (ECU); W 4-0	Wang (CAN); L 1-4	Did not advance			
Horacio Cifuentes	Singles	—N/a			Wu Zhang (DOM); W 4-2	Aguirre (PAR); W 4-0	Pereira (CUB); L 3-4	Did not advance		
Santiago Lorenzo	Singles	—N/a			Knight (BAR); W 4-1	Liang (USA); W 4-1	Madrid (MEX); L 0-4	Did not advance		
Gastón Alto; Horacio Cifuentes	Doubles	—N/a					Miño / Riofrio (ECU); W 4-2	Campos / Pereira (CUB); L 2-4	Did not advance	3rd place, bronze medalist(s)
Gastón Alto; Horacio Cifuentes; Santiago Lorenzo	Team	Peru; W 3-1	Chile; W 3-0	1 Q	—N/a		Cuba; W 3-1	Brazil; L 2-3	Did not advance	3rd place, bronze medalist(s)

Women

Athlete	Event	Group stage			First round	Second round	Quarterfinal	Semifinal	Final / BM	
Athlete	Event	Opposition Result	Opposition Result	Rank	Opposition Result	Opposition Result	Opposition Result	Opposition Result	Opposition Result	Rank
Ana Codina	Singles	—N/a			Paredes (ECU); W 4-2	Zhang (CAN); L 1-4	Did not advance			
Camila Argüelles	Singles	—N/a			Arellano (ECU); L 2-4	Did not advance				
Camila Argüelles; Candela Molero	Doubles	—N/a					Enriquez / Cordero (EAI); L 3-4	Did not advance		
Ana Codina; Camila Argüelles; Candela Molero	Team	United States; L 1-3	Independent Athletes Team; W 3-1	2 Q	—N/a		Puerto Rico; L 0-3	Did not advance		

Mixed

Athlete	Event	First round	Quarterfinal	Semifinal	Final / BM	
Athlete	Event	Opposition Result	Opposition Result	Opposition Result	Opposition Result	Rank
Horacio Cifuentes; Camila Argüelles	Doubles	Montes / Perdomo (COL); W 4-0	Campos / Fonseca (CUB); L 3-4	Did not advance		

== Taekwondo ==
Argentina qualified 7 athletes (four men and three women) during the Pan American Games Qualification Tournament.

Kyorugi

Men

Athlete	Event	Round of 16	Quarterfinals	Semifinals	Repechage	Final/ BM	
Athlete	Event	Opposition Result	Opposition Result	Opposition Result	Opposition Result	Opposition Result	Rank
Lucas Guzmán	–58 kg	Barreto (PER); W 2–0	Garrido (COL); W 2–0	Melo (BRA); W 2–0	Bye	Plaza (MEX); L 1-2	2nd place, silver medalist(s)
José Luis Acuña	–68 kg	Pie (DOM); L 0–2	Did not advance		Gonzalez (URU); W 2-0	Bronze medal final Paz (COL); W 2-0	3rd place, bronze medalist(s)
Dylan Olmedo	–80 kg	Hernandez (DOM); L 0–2	Did not advance				
Agustín Alves	+80 kg	Holder (BAR); W 2-0	de Andrade (BRA); W 2-1	Healy (USA); L 0-2	Bye	Bronze medal final Arroyo (ECU); W 2-0	3rd place, bronze medalist(s)
Lucas Guzmán; José Luis Acuña; Agustín Alves	Team	—N/a	Brazil; L 95-101	Did not advance			

Women

Athlete	Event	Round of 16	Quarterfinals	Semifinals	Repechage	Final/ BM	
Athlete	Event	Opposition Result	Opposition Result	Opposition Result	Opposition Result	Opposition Result	Rank
Giulia Sendra	–49 kg	Stambaugh (PUR); W 2–0	Ramírez (COL); L 0–2	Bye	Did not advance	Bronze medal final Guelet (CHI); W 2-0	3rd place, bronze medalist(s)
Carla Godoy	–57 kg	Sulbaran (VEN); L 1–2	Did not advance				
Victoria Rivas	+67 kg	Heredia (MEX); L 0–2	Did not advance				
Giulia Sendra; Carla Godoy; Victoria Rivas	Team	—N/a	Colombia; L 24-32	Did not advance			

== Tennis ==
Argentina qualified a total of seven tennis players (three men and four women).

Men

Athlete	Event	Round of 64	Round of 32	Round of 16	Quarterfinal	Semifinal	Final / BM	
Athlete	Event	Opposition Result	Opposition Result	Opposition Result	Opposition Result	Opposition Result	Opposition Result	Rank
Facundo Díaz Acosta	Singles	Bye	Perez (VEN); W 6–2, 6–1	Soriano (COL); W 6–2, 6–4	Escobedo (MEX); W 6–3, 6–7(5), 6–1	Heide (BRA); W 4-6, 6-4, 7-6(6)	Barrios (CHI); W 6-3, 7-6(5)	1st place, gold medalist(s)
Facundo Bagnis	Singles	Bye	Zeballos (BOL); W 6–2, 6–7(4), 7–6(2)	Mejía (COL); W 6–3, 6–4	Monteiro (BRA); L 2-6, 4-6	Did not advance		
Facundo Díaz Acosta; Facundo Bagnis	Doubles	—N/a		Vallejo / Vergara (PAR); L 4-6, 7-5, 3-10	Did not advance			

Women

Athlete	Event	Round of 64	Round of 32	Round of 16	Quarterfinal	Semifinal	Final / BM	
Athlete	Event	Opposition Result	Opposition Result	Opposition Result	Opposition Result	Opposition Result	Opposition Result	Rank
Luciana Moyano	Singles	Zamburek (DOM); W 7–5, 6–4	Seguel (CHI); L 3–6, 4–6	Did not advance				
Julia Riera	Singles	Bye	Espinal (HON); W 6–2, 6–1	Reasco (ECU); W 6–4, 6–0	Suarez (VEN); W 6–4, 6–2	Pigossi (BRA); L 6-4, 4-6, 6(5)-7	Bronze medal match Marino (CAN); W 3-6, 6-4, 6-1	3rd place, bronze medalist(s)
María Lourdes Carlé	Singles	Bye	Licht (URU); W 6–0, 6–2	Labraña (CHI); W 6–2, 6–2	Meligeni (BRA); W 7–6(5), 6–1	Marino (CAN); W 6-1, 6-4	Pigossi (BRA); L 2-6, 3-6	2nd place, silver medalist(s)
Martina Capurro Taborda	Singles	Bye	Andrade (ECU); W 6–1, 6–4	Lizarazo (COL); L 4-6, 1-6	Did not advance			
María Lourdes Carlé; Julia Riera	Doubles	—N/a		Bye	Weedon / Dominguez (EAI); W 7–5, 6–0	Herazo / Pérez (COL); L 6-7(5), 6-2, 5-10	Bronze medal match Guarachi / Labraña (CHI); W 6–3, 6–3	3rd place, bronze medalist(s)

Mixed

Athlete	Event	Round of 16	Quarterfinal	Semifinal	Final / BM	
Athlete	Event	Opposition Result	Opposition Result	Opposition Result	Opposition Result	Rank
Facundo Díaz Acosta; Martina Capurro Taborda	Doubles	Lama / Guarachi (CHI); W 6-3, 6-7, 11-9	N Zeballos / F Zeballos (BOL); W 7-6(2), 6-4	Demoliner / Stefani (BRA); L 2-6, 4-6	Bronze medal match Huertas del Pino / Ccuno (PER); W 6-1, 6-4	3rd place, bronze medalist(s)

== Triathlon ==
Argentina qualified a team of four triathletes (two men and two women) after finishing fifth at the 2023 Pan American Mixed Relays Championship.

Athlete	Event	Swim (1.5 km)	Trans 1	Bike (40 km)	Trans 2	Run (10 km)	Total	Rank
Iván Anzaldo	Men's individual	19:43	0:49	58:08	0:28	34:25	1:53:35	23
Flavio Morandini	Men's individual	18:21	0:51	Did not finish				
Moira Vásquez	Women's individual	18:47	0:57	1:02:38	0:30	37:45	2:00:39	14
Romina Biagioli	Women's individual	19:43	0:59	1:07:58	0:39	38:28	2:07:50	23

Mixed relay

Athlete	Event	Swimming (300 m)	Transition 1	Biking (6.6 km)	Transition2	Running (1.5 km)	Total	Rank
Moira Vásquez	Mixed relay	4:03	0:51	9:55	0:28	6:01	21:18	—N/a
Iván Anzaldo	Mixed relay	3:46	0:49	9:16	0:25	4:51	19:07	—N/a
Romina Biagioli	Mixed relay	4:00	1:06	10:18	0:24	5:08	20:56	—N/a
Flavio Morandini	Mixed relay	3:23	0:45	8:43	0:27	4:39	17:57	—N/a
Total	Mixed relay	—N/a					1:19:28	10

== Volleyball ==
=== Beach ===
Argentina qualified a men's and women's pair for a total of four athletes.

Athlete	Event	Group stage				Round of 16	Quarterfinal	Semifinal	Final / BM	
Athlete	Event	Opposition Result	Opposition Result	Opposition Result	Rank	Opposition Result	Opposition Result	Opposition Result	Opposition Result	Rank
Nicolás Capogrosso; Tomás Capogrosso	Men's	Varela / Dyner (CRC); W (21–12, 21–11)	Tenorio / Leon (ECU); W (21–17, 21–13)	Macneil; Russell (CAN); W (21–14, 21–12)	1 Q	Bye	Loyola / Wanderley (BRA); L (17–21, 21–15, 15-17)	Did not advance		
Ana Gallay; Fernanda Pereyra	Women's	Alvarado / Giron (EAI); W (21–11, 21–6)	Gaona / Allcca (PER); W (21–16, 21–15)	Quiggle / Schermerhorn (USA); L (22-24, 17-21)	2 Q	Payano / Almanzar (DOM); W (21–18, 21–15)	Gutierrez / Flores (MEX); W (21-16, 21-17)	Wilkerson / Humana-Paredes (CAN); L (15-21, 15-21)	Quiggle / Murphy (USA); L (18-21, 10-21)	4

=== Indoor ===
Summary

Team	Event	Group stage				Quarterfinal	Semifinal	Final / BM / Pl.	
Team	Event	Opposition Result	Opposition Result	Opposition Result	Rank	Opposition Result	Opposition Result	Opposition Result	Rank
Men	Men's tournament	Puerto Rico; W (3-0)	Dominican Republic; W (3-1)	Chile; W (3-0)	1 Q	Bye	Cuba; W (3-1)	Brazil; L (0-3)	2nd place, silver medalist(s)
Women	Women's tournament	Puerto Rico; W (3-1)	Brazil; L (0-3)	Cuba; W (3-0)	2 Q	Chile; W (3-2)	Dominican Republic; L (1-3)	Bronze medal final Mexico; L (2-3)	4

Men's tournament

Argentina qualified a men's team (of 12 athletes) by finishing second in the CSV Qualifying Tournament.

Roster

- Demián González
- Bruno Lima
- Agustín Gallardo
- Facundo Conte
- Gustavo Maciel
- Nicolás Lazo
- Marcos Meana
- Tobías Scarpa
- Ezequiel Vázquez
- Sergio Soria
- Mauro Zelayeta
- Manuel Balague

Group B

Pos	Team	Pld	W	L	Pts	SPW	SPL	SPR	SW	SL	SR
1	Argentina	3	3	0	9	251	208	1.207	9	1	9.000
2	Chile	3	2	1	6	253	253	1.000	6	5	1.200
3	Puerto Rico	3	1	2	3	245	264	0.928	4	7	0.571
4	Dominican Republic	3	0	3	0	265	289	0.917	3	9	0.333

Source: Santiago 2023

30 October 2023; 17:30	Argentina	3–0	Puerto Rico	Arena Parque O'Higgins, Santiago; Attendance: 7,000
30 October 2023; 17:30	(25–23, 26–24, 25–15); P2P3			Arena Parque O'Higgins, Santiago; Attendance: 7,000

31 October 2023; 17:30	Argentina	3–1	Dominican Republic	Arena Parque O'Higgins, Santiago; Attendance: 10,000
31 October 2023; 17:30	(20–25, 30–28, 25–17, 25–20); P2P3			Arena Parque O'Higgins, Santiago; Attendance: 10,000

1 November 2023; 20:30	Chile	0–3	Argentina	Arena Parque O'Higgins, Santiago; Attendance: 10,000
1 November 2023; 20:30	(15–25, 20–25, 21–25); P2P3			Arena Parque O'Higgins, Santiago; Attendance: 10,000

Semifinal

3 November 2023; 17:30	Argentina	3–1	Cuba	Arena Parque O'Higgins, Santiago
3 November 2023; 17:30	(21–25, 25–22, 25–18, 25–18)			Arena Parque O'Higgins, Santiago

Gold medal match

4 November 2023; 20:00	Argentina	0–3	Brazil	Arena Parque O'Higgins, Santiago
4 November 2023; 20:00	(23–25, 13–25, 22–25)			Arena Parque O'Higgins, Santiago

Women's tournament

Argentina qualified a women's team (of 12 athletes) by winning the CSV Qualifying Tournament.

Roster

- Tatiana Vera
- Daiana López
- Avril García
- Bianca Farriol
- Candela Salinas
- María Corbalan
- Daniela Simian
- María Luz Martínez
- Zoe Studer
- Dalma Pérez
- María Pelozo
- Tatiana Rizzo

Group A

Pos	Team	Pld	W	L	Pts	SPW	SPL	SPR	SW	SL	SR
1	Brazil	3	3	0	9	225	153	1.471	9	0	MAX
2	Argentina	3	2	1	6	218	208	1.048	6	4	1.500
3	Puerto Rico	3	1	2	3	212	221	0.959	4	6	0.667
4	Cuba	3	0	3	0	152	225	0.676	0	9	0.000

Source: Santiago 2023

21 October 2023; 13:30	Puerto Rico	1–3	Argentina	Arena Parque O'Higgins, Santiago; Attendance: 8,000
21 October 2023; 13:30	(17–25, 18–25, 25–17, 19–25); P2 P3			Arena Parque O'Higgins, Santiago; Attendance: 8,000

22 October 2023; 13:30	Brazil	3–0	Argentina	Arena Parque O'Higgins, Santiago; Attendance: 9,000
22 October 2023; 13:30	(25–13, 25–20, 25–18); P2 P3			Arena Parque O'Higgins, Santiago; Attendance: 9,000

23 October 2023; 10:30	Brazil	3–0	Puerto Rico	Arena Parque O'Higgins, Santiago; Attendance: 5,260
23 October 2023; 10:30	(25–15, 25–22, 25–21); P2 P3			Arena Parque O'Higgins, Santiago; Attendance: 5,260

Quarterfinals

24 October 2023; 13:30	Argentina	3–2	Chile	Arena Parque O'Higgins, Santiago; Attendance: 6,000
24 October 2023; 13:30	(25–19, 25–9, 21–25, 23–25, 15–7); P2 P3			Arena Parque O'Higgins, Santiago; Attendance: 6,000

Semifinals

25 October 2023; 17:30	Dominican Republic	3–1	Argentina	Arena Parque O'Higgins, Santiago; Attendance: 9,500
25 October 2023; 17:30	(16–25, 25–19, 25–20, 25–17); P2 P3			Arena Parque O'Higgins, Santiago; Attendance: 9,500

Bronze medal match

26 October 2023; 17:00	Argentina	2–3	Mexico	Arena Parque O'Higgins, Santiago; Attendance: 14,500
26 October 2023; 17:00	(25–22, 23–25, 25–22, 18–25, 13–15); P2 P3			Arena Parque O'Higgins, Santiago; Attendance: 14,500

== Water polo ==
Summary

Team	Event	Group stage				Quarterfinal	Semifinal	Final / BM / Pl.	
Team	Event	Opposition Result	Opposition Result	Opposition Result	Rank	Opposition Result	Opposition Result	Opposition Result	Rank
Argentina men	Men's tournament	Cuba; W 20-4	Chile; W 16-3	Canada; L 7-14	2 Q	Puerto Rico; W 16-6	United States; L 7-22	Bronze medal match Canada; W 12-10	3rd place, bronze medalist(s)
Argentina women	Women's tournament	Canada; L 9-14	Mexico; W 8-6	Cuba; W 18-17	2 Q	Puerto Rico; W 13-11	United States; L 1-27	Bronze medal match Brazil; L 9-10	4

=== Men's tournament ===
Argentina qualified a men's team (of 12 athletes) by finishing second in the 2022 South American Games.

Roster

- Diego Malnero
- Ramiro Veich
- Tomás Galimberti
- Tomás Tilatti
- Guido Martino
- Tomás Echenique
- Teo Soler
- Eduardo Bonomo
- Carlos Camnasio
- Esteban Corsi
- Guido Poggi
- Nahuel Leona
- Octavio Salas

Group B

Pos	Team	Pld	W	PSW	PSL	L	GF	GA	GD	Pts	Qualification
1	Canada	3	3	0	0	0	71	18	+53	9	Quarterfinals
2	Argentina	3	2	0	0	1	43	21	+22	6	Quarterfinals
3	Cuba	3	1	0	0	2	24	58	−34	3	Quarterfinals
4	Chile (H)	3	0	0	0	3	16	57	−41	0	Quarterfinals

Source: Santiago 2023
Rules for classification: 1) points; 2) head-to-head points; 3) head-to-head goal difference; 4) head-to-head number of goals scored; 5) goal difference.
(H) Host

30 October 2023; 16:30	Report	Argentina	20–4	Cuba	Aquatic Center, Santiago; Referees: Gomez Portodomingo (ESP); Spiritosanto (USA)
30 October 2023; 16:30	Report	Score by quarters: 2–1, 6–2, 6–0, 6–1			Aquatic Center, Santiago; Referees: Gomez Portodomingo (ESP); Spiritosanto (USA)
30 October 2023; 16:30	Report	Corsi 6	Goals	Ponsa 4	Aquatic Center, Santiago; Referees: Gomez Portodomingo (ESP); Spiritosanto (USA)

31 October 2023; 19:30	Report	Argentina	16–3	Chile	Aquatic Center, Santiago; Referees: Dabbaghian (USA); Castillo Torres (PUR)
31 October 2023; 19:30	Report	Score by quarters: 3–0, 4–1, 5–0, 4–2			Aquatic Center, Santiago; Referees: Dabbaghian (USA); Castillo Torres (PUR)
31 October 2023; 19:30	Report	Tilatti 4	Goals	three players 1	Aquatic Center, Santiago; Referees: Dabbaghian (USA); Castillo Torres (PUR)

1 November 2023; 16:30	Report	Argentina	7–14	Canada	Aquatic Center, Santiago; Referees: Harvey Hinds (CUW); David Gomez Pordomingo (ESP)
1 November 2023; 16:30	Report	Score by quarters: 3–4, 1–4, 1–3, 2–3			Aquatic Center, Santiago; Referees: Harvey Hinds (CUW); David Gomez Pordomingo (ESP)
1 November 2023; 16:30	Report	Veich 3	Goals	Constantin-Bicari 5	Aquatic Center, Santiago; Referees: Harvey Hinds (CUW); David Gomez Pordomingo (ESP)

Quarterfinal

2 November 2023; 16:30	Report	Puerto Rico	9–20	Argentina	Aquatic Center, Santiago; Referees: Mikhail Dykman (CAN); Frank Ohme (GER)
2 November 2023; 16:30	Report	Score by quarters: 2–4, 1–3, 3–7, 3–6			Aquatic Center, Santiago; Referees: Mikhail Dykman (CAN); Frank Ohme (GER)
2 November 2023; 16:30	Report	Bayo, F. Zayas 2	Goals	Camnasio 6	Aquatic Center, Santiago; Referees: Mikhail Dykman (CAN); Frank Ohme (GER)

Semifinal

3 November 2023; 19:30	Report	Argentina	7–22	United States	Aquatic Center, Santiago; Referees: Gerardo Arellano Jr (MEX); Frank Ohme (GER)
3 November 2023; 19:30	Report	Score by quarters: 1–6, 0–4, 4–6, 6–6			Aquatic Center, Santiago; Referees: Gerardo Arellano Jr (MEX); Frank Ohme (GER)
3 November 2023; 19:30	Report	Galimberti 2	Goals	Irving 6	Aquatic Center, Santiago; Referees: Gerardo Arellano Jr (MEX); Frank Ohme (GER)

Bronze medal match

4 November 2023; 19:00	Report	Canada	10–12	Argentina	Aquatic Center, Santiago; Referees: David Gomez Pordomingo (ESP); Darren Spirtosanto (USA)
4 November 2023; 19:00	Report	Score by quarters: 2–3, 1–3, 3–2, 4–4			Aquatic Center, Santiago; Referees: David Gomez Pordomingo (ESP); Darren Spirtosanto (USA)
4 November 2023; 19:00	Report	four players 2	Goals	Camnasio 3	Aquatic Center, Santiago; Referees: David Gomez Pordomingo (ESP); Darren Spirtosanto (USA)

=== Women's tournament ===
Argentina qualified a women's team (of 12 athletes) by finishing second in the 2022 South American Games.

Roster

- Nahir Stegmayer
- Lucía Ruiz Castellani
- Cecilia Leonard
- Ashley Hatcher
- Ludmila Ianni
- Magalí Bacigalupo
- Julieta Auliel
- Carla Comba
- Isabel Riley
- Ana Agnesina
- Anahí Bacigalupo
- María Sol Canda
- Aldana Videberrigain

Group A

Pos	Team	Pld	W	PSW	PSL	L	GF	GA	GD	Pts	Qualification
1	Canada	3	3	0	0	0	70	19	+51	9	Quarterfinals
2	Argentina	3	1	1	0	1	35	37	−2	5	Quarterfinals
3	Cuba	3	1	0	1	1	34	53	−19	4	Quarterfinals
4	Mexico	3	0	0	0	3	24	54	−30	0	Quarterfinals

Source: Santiago 2023
Rules for classification: 1) points; 2) head-to-head points; 3) head-to-head goal difference; 4) head-to-head number of goals scored; 5) goal difference.

30 October 2023; 11:00	Report	Canada	14–9	Argentina	Aquatic Center, Santiago; Referees: Jose Garcia Soto (VEN); Reynel Castillo (USA)
30 October 2023; 11:00	Report	Score by quarters: 3–2, 6–1, 1–4, 4–2			Aquatic Center, Santiago; Referees: Jose Garcia Soto (VEN); Reynel Castillo (USA)
30 October 2023; 11:00	Report	Bakoc 4	Goals	Auliel, A. Bacigalupo 3	Aquatic Center, Santiago; Referees: Jose Garcia Soto (VEN); Reynel Castillo (USA)

31 October 2023; 11:00	Report	Mexico	6–8	Argentina	Aquatic Center, Santiago; Referees: Yuri Machado (BRA); David Gomez Pordomingo (ESP)
31 October 2023; 11:00	Report	Score by quarters: 0–0, 0–4, 5–3, 1–1			Aquatic Center, Santiago; Referees: Yuri Machado (BRA); David Gomez Pordomingo (ESP)
31 October 2023; 11:00	Report	Guzmán 3	Goals	Auliel, Leonard 2	Aquatic Center, Santiago; Referees: Yuri Machado (BRA); David Gomez Pordomingo (ESP)

1 November 2023; 11:00	Report	Cuba	17–18 (PSO)	Argentina	Aquatic Center, Santiago; Referees: Danielle Dabbaghian (USA); Reynel Castillo (PUR)
1 November 2023; 11:00	Report	Score by quarters: 5–2, 3–3, 3–3, 1–4 PSO: 5–6			Aquatic Center, Santiago; Referees: Danielle Dabbaghian (USA); Reynel Castillo (PUR)
1 November 2023; 11:00	Report	Zunzunegui 4	Goals	A. Bacigalupo 6	Aquatic Center, Santiago; Referees: Danielle Dabbaghian (USA); Reynel Castillo (PUR)

Quarterfinal

2 November 2023; 8:00	Report	Argentina	13–11	Puerto Rico	Aquatic Center, Santiago; Referees: Hélène Painchaud (CAN); Yuri Machado (BRA)
2 November 2023; 8:00	Report	Score by quarters: 1–2, 4–3, 6–5, 2–1			Aquatic Center, Santiago; Referees: Hélène Painchaud (CAN); Yuri Machado (BRA)
2 November 2023; 8:00	Report	Leonard 5	Goals	Cardona 3	Aquatic Center, Santiago; Referees: Hélène Painchaud (CAN); Yuri Machado (BRA)

Semifinal

3 November 2023; 11:00	Report	Argentina	1–27	United States	Aquatic Center, Santiago; Referees: Xavier Villanueva (CHI); Daniel Federico Daners (URU)
3 November 2023; 11:00	Report	Score by quarters: 0–7, 0–7, 1–6, 0–7			Aquatic Center, Santiago; Referees: Xavier Villanueva (CHI); Daniel Federico Daners (URU)
3 November 2023; 11:00	Report	Leonard 1	Goals	four players 4	Aquatic Center, Santiago; Referees: Xavier Villanueva (CHI); Daniel Federico Daners (URU)

Bronze medal match

4 November 2023; 11:00	Report	Argentina	9–10	Brazil	Aquatic Center, Santiago; Referees: Ernesto Hernández Toledo (CUB); Gerardo Arellano Jr
4 November 2023; 11:00	Report	Score by quarters: 3–2, 3–3, 1–1, 2–4			Aquatic Center, Santiago; Referees: Ernesto Hernández Toledo (CUB); Gerardo Arellano Jr
4 November 2023; 11:00	Report	Canda 3	Goals	Ferreira 3	Aquatic Center, Santiago; Referees: Ernesto Hernández Toledo (CUB); Gerardo Arellano Jr

== Water skiing ==
Argentina qualified two wakeboarders (one of each gender) during the 2022 Pan American Championship.

Argentina also qualified four water skiers during the 2022 Pan American Water skiing Championship.

Men

Athlete	Event	Preliminary		Final				
Athlete	Event	Score	Rank	Slalom	Jump	Tricks	Total	Rank
Tobías Giorgis	Slalom	1.50/58/10.75	4 Q	1.50/58/10.75	—N/a			6
Tobías Giorgis	Jump	63.7	1 Q	—N/a	63.3	—N/a		3rd place, bronze medalist(s)
Tobías Giorgis	Tricks	9510	5 Q	—N/a		9330	—N/a	5
Tobías Giorgis	Overall	2,672.49	2 Q	4.00/58/10.75	64.3	7580	2689.09	2nd place, silver medalist(s)
Patricio Zohar	Slalom	3.00/58/11.25	8	Did not advance				
Patricio Zohar	Jump	56.9	5 Q	—N/a	56.8	—N/a		5
Patricio Zohar	Tricks	5770	6 Q	—N/a		5890	—N/a	6
Patricio Zohar	Overall	2,106.30	4 Q	5.50/58/11.25	58.0	5130	2219.51	4
Antonio Collazo	Slalom	2.00/58/10.75	3 Q	2.00/58/10.75	—N/a			5
Antonio Collazo	Tricks	2540	10	Did not advance				

Women

Athlete	Event	Preliminary		Final				
Athlete	Event	Score	Rank	Slalom	Jump	Tricks	Total	Rank
Violeta Mociuslky	Slalom	3.50/55/12.00	7 Q	4.00/55/12.00	—N/a			6
Violeta Mociuslky	Jump	1.0	8	Did not advance				
Violeta Mociuslky	Tricks	3970	9	Did not advance				
Violeta Mociuslky	Overall	1,093.06	8	Did not advance				

Wakeboard
Men

Athlete	Event	Qualification		Last Chance Qualifier		Final	
Athlete	Event	Score	Rank	Score	Rank	Score	Rank
Kai Ditsch	Men's wakeboard	81.67	1 Q	Bye		88.33	1st place, gold medalist(s)
Eugenia de Armas	Women's wakeboard	85.00	1 Q	Bye		83.11	1st place, gold medalist(s)

== Weightlifting ==
Argentina qualified five weightlifters (two men and three women).

Athlete	Event	Snatch		Clean & Jerk		Total	Rank
Athlete	Event	Result	Rank	Result	Rank	Total	Rank
Nicolás Rivero	Men's –73 kg	~~DNS~~		—N/a			
Dante Pizzuti	Men's –89 kg	143	8	175	9	318	9
Ludmila Gerzel	Women's –49 kg	71	6	90	6	161	5
María Luz Casadevall	Women's –59 kg	~~DSQ~~		~~DNS~~		—N/a	
Tatiana Ullua	Women's –71 kg	92	9	116	8	208	8

== Wrestling ==
Argentina qualified nine wrestlers through the 2022 Pan American Wrestling Championships and the 2023 Pan American Wrestling Championships.

Key:

- VT – Victory by fall.
- PP – Decision by points – the loser with technical points.
- PO – Decision by points – the loser without technical points.
- SP – Technical superiority – the loser with technical points and a margin of victory of at least 9 (Greco-Roman) or 10 (freestyle) points.
- ST – Great superiority – the loser without technical points and a margin of victory of at least 8 (Greco-Roman) or 10 (freestyle) points.
- VA – Decision by withdrawal

Men

Athlete	Event	Round of 16	Quarterfinal	Semifinal	Repechage	Final / BM	
Athlete	Event	Opposition Result	Opposition Result	Opposition Result	Opposition Result	Opposition Result	Rank
Hernán Almendra	Freestyle 57 kg	Bye	Tigreros (COL); L 0-12	Did not advance	—N/a	Bronze medal match Diversent (CUB); L 0-2	4
Agustín Destribats	Freestyle 65 kg	Bye	Chavez (BOL); W 11-0	Garrett (USA); L 5-7	Bye	Bronze medal match Auccapiña (PER); W 7-1	3rd place, bronze medalist(s)
Ricardo Báez	Freestyle 97 kg	Randhawa (CAN); L 4-14	Did not advance				
Catriel Muriel	Freestyle 125 kg	Bye	Torres (CUB); W 4-1	Diaz (VEN); L 0-3	—N/a	Bronze medal match Smith (PUR); W 7-6	3rd place, bronze medalist(s)
Samuel Mesropian	Greco-Roman 60 kg	Peralta (ECU); L 0-9	Did not advance				
Mauricio Lovera	Greco-Roman 67 kg	Bye	Horta (COL); L 0-8	Did not advance	—N/a	Bronze medal match Soto (PER); L 0-9	4
Nahuel Gómez	Greco-Roman 97 kg	Bye	Madrid (PAN); W 3-1	Perez (VEN); L 0-8	—N/a	Bronze medal match Queiroz (BRA); L 0-7	4

Women

Athlete	Event	Group round			Round of 16	Quarterfinal	Semifinal	Repechage	Final / BM	
Athlete	Event	Opposition Result	Opposition Result	Rank	Opposition Result	Opposition Result	Opposition Result	Opposition Result	Opposition Result	Rank
Patricia Bermúdez	50 kg	Golston (USA); L VFO	Mollocana (ECU); L VFO	3	—N/a		Did not advance			
Linda Machuca	76 kg	—N/a			Marín (CUB); L 0-10	Did not advance		Kuebeck (CAN); L VFA	Did not advance	

== Demonstration sports ==
=== Esports ===
Argentina qualified 14 athletes (seven men and seven women).

Men

- Lautaro Raris
- Alan Cruz
- Fabricio Suárez
- Mariano Caneda
- Mauricio Avendaño
- Nicolás Flores
- Nicolás Moreno

Women

- María Belén Giunta
- Débora Ponce
- Lucía Polanco
- Luz Ayala
- Milena Evangelista
- Romina Pacheco
- Victoria Destribats

== See also ==
- Argentina at the 2024 Summer Olympics
