= Water skiing at the 2023 Pan American Games – Men's wakeboard =

Men's wakeboard at the 2023 Pan American Games
- Venue: Laguna Los Morros
- Dates: October 21 - October 24
- Competitors: 8 from 8 nations
- Winning score: 88.33

Medalists
| Gold medal | Kai Ditsch | Argentina |
| Silver medal | Hunter Smith | Canada |
| Bronze medal | Daniel Johnson | United States |

The men's wakeboard competition of the water skiing events at the 2023 Pan American Games will be held from October 21 to 24 at Laguna Los Morros in Santiago, Chile.

== Schedule ==
| Date | Time | Round |
|---|---|---|
| October 21, 2023 | 14:30 | Heat 1 |
| October 21, 2023 | 15:00 | Heat 2 |
| October 21, 2023 | 16:05 | Last Chance Qualifiers |
| October 24, 2023 | 15:30 | Final |

== Results ==
=== Heats ===
==== Heat 1 ====
| Rank | Name | Country | Result | Notes |
|---|---|---|---|---|
| 1 | Kai Ditsch | Argentina | 81.67 | Q |
| 2 | Daniel Johnson | United States | 77.67 | Q |
| 3 | Jorge Rocha | Colombia | 71.11 | L |
| 4 | Maximiliano Barbiers | Chile | 60.56 | L |

==== Heat 2 ====
| Rank | Name | Country | Result | Notes |
|---|---|---|---|---|
| 1 | Pablo Monroy | Mexico | 78.33 | Q |
| 2 | Hunter Smith | Canada | 70.22 | Q |
| 3 | Henrique Martini | Brazil | 58.33 | L |
| 4 | Camilo Corrales | Paraguay | 20.00 | L |

==== Last Chance Qualifiers ====
| Rank | Name | Country | Result | Notes |
|---|---|---|---|---|
| 1 | Jorge Rocha | Colombia | 83.78 | Q |
| 2 | Henrique Martini | Brazil | 76.67 | Q |
| 3 | Maximiliano Barbiers | Chile | 71.67 | |
| 4 | Camilo Corrales | Paraguay | 38.33 | |

=== Final ===
| Rank | Name | Country | Result | Notes |
|---|---|---|---|---|
| 1st place, gold medalist(s) | Kai Ditsch | Argentina | 88.33 | |
| 2nd place, silver medalist(s) | Hunter Smith | Canada | 82.67 | |
| 3rd place, bronze medalist(s) | Daniel Johnson | United States | 78.33 | |
| 4 | Jorge Rocha | Colombia | 72.22 | |
| 5 | Pablo Monroy | Mexico | 65.00 | |
| 6 | Henrique Martini | Brazil | 51.67 | |
