= Basque pelota at the 2023 Pan American Games – Men's doubles trinquete rubber ball =

Men's doubles trinquete rubber ball at the 2023 Pan American Games
- Venue: Spanish Stadium
- Dates: October 31 - November 5
- Competitors: 10 from 5 nations

Medalists
Gold medal	Facundo Andreasen; Alfredo Villegas	Argentina
Silver medal	Arturo Rodríguez; Daniel García	Mexico
Bronze medal	Julián Stabon; Esteban Romero	Chile

The men's doubles trinquete rubber ball competition of the basque pelota events at the 2023 Pan American Games was held from October 31 to November 4 at Spanish Stadium in Las Condes, Chile.

== Schedule ==
Date	Time	Round
October 31, 2023 - November 4, 2023	17:00	Group A Matches
November 5, 2023	09:00	Finals

== Results ==
=== Group A ===
Pos	Team	Pld	W	L	GF	GA	GD	PF	PA	PD	Pts	Qualification
1	Facundo Andreasen (ARG) Alfredo Villegas (ARG)	4	4	0	8	0	+8	120	55	+65	12	Advance to Gold medal match
2	Arturo Rodríguez (MEX) Daniel García (MEX)	4	3	1	6	3	+3	114	86	+28	10	Advance to Gold medal match
3	Manuel Pelua (URU) Andrés Pintos (URU)	4	2	2	4	5	−1	92	110	−18	8	Advance to Bronze medal match
4	Julián Stabon (CHI) Esteban Romero (CHI) (H)	4	1	3	4	6	−2	109	110	−1	6	Advance to Bronze medal match
5	Renee Escapa (PER) André Bellido (PER)	4	0	4	0	8	−8	46	120	−74	4	

Source: Santiago 2023
(H) Host

Date	Time	Player 1	Score	Player 2	Game 1	Game 2	Game 3	Report
October 31	17:56	Facundo Andreasen (Argentina); Alfredo Villegas (Argentina)	2–0	(Mexico) Arturo Rodríguez (Mexico) Daniel García	15–7	15–9		Report
October 31	19:40	Manuel Pelua (Uruguay); Andrés Pintos (Uruguay)	2-1	(Chile) Julián Stabon (Chile) Esteban Romero	15–12	6–15	10–8	Report
November 1	18:06	Facundo Andreasen (Argentina); Alfredo Villegas (Argentina)	2–0	(Uruguay) Manuel Pelua (Uruguay) Andrés Pintos	15–6	15–9		Report
November 1	19:03	Arturo Rodríguez (Mexico); Daniel García (Mexico)	2–0	(Peru) Renee Escapa (Peru) André Bellido	15–4	15–7		Report
November 2	17:42	Renee Escapa (Peru); André Bellido (Peru)	0–2	(Argentina) Facundo Andreasen (Argentina) Alfredo Villegas	4–15	5–15		Report
November 2	19:36	Julián Stabon (Chile); Esteban Romero (Chile)	1–2	(Mexico) Arturo Rodríguez (Mexico) Daniel García	7–15	15–13	7–10	Report
November 3	17:48	Julián Stabon (Chile); Esteban Romero (Chile)	0–2	(Argentina) Facundo Andreasen (Argentina) Alfredo Villegas	7–15	8–15		Report
November 3	18:44	Renee Escapa (Peru); André Bellido (Peru)	0–2	(Uruguay) Manuel Pelua (Uruguay) Andrés Pintos	7–15	8–15		Report
November 4	18:41	Arturo Rodríguez (Mexico); Daniel García (Mexico)	2–0	(Uruguay) Manuel Pelua (Uruguay) Andrés Pintos	15–5	15–11		Report
November 4	19:29	Julián Stabon (Chile); Esteban Romero (Chile)	2–0	(Peru) Renee Escapa (Peru) André Bellido	15–6	15–5		Report

=== Bronze medal match ===
Date	Time	Player 1	Score	Player 2	Game 1	Game 2	Game 3	Report
November 5	10:04	Manuel Pelua (Uruguay); Andrés Pintos (Uruguay)	0-2	(Chile) Julián Stabon (Chile) Esteban Romero	8–15	14–15		Report

=== Gold medal match ===
Date	Time	Player 1	Score	Player 2	Game 1	Game 2	Game 3	Report
November 5	13:40	Facundo Andreasen (Argentina); Alfredo Villegas (Argentina)	2-0	(Mexico) Arturo Rodríguez (Mexico) Daniel García	15–8	15–2		Report

== Final standings ==
Rank	Nation	Name
1st place, gold medalist(s)	Argentina	Facundo Andreasen; Alfredo Villegas
2nd place, silver medalist(s)	Mexico	Arturo Rodríguez; Daniel García
3rd place, bronze medalist(s)	Chile	Julián Stabon; Esteban Romero
4	Uruguay	Manuel Pelua; Andrés Pintos
5	Peru	Renee Escapa; André Bellido
