= Basque pelota at the 2023 Pan American Games – Men's doubles frontenis =

Men's doubles frontenis at the 2023 Pan American Games
- Venue: Spanish Stadium
- Dates: October 31 - November 5
- Competitors: 10 from 5 nations

Medalists
| Gold medal | Isaac Cruz; Jorge Olvera | Mexico |
| Silver medal | Omar Espinoza; Salvador Espinoza | United States |
| Bronze medal | Lorenzo Cardozo; Emiliano García | Argentina |

The men's doubles frontenis competition of the basque pelota events at the 2023 Pan American Games was held from October 31 to November 5 at Spanish Stadium in Las Condes, Chile.

== Schedule ==
| Date | Time | Round |
|---|---|---|
| October 31, 2023 - November 4, 2023 | 16:00 | Group A Matches |
| November 5, 2023 | 08:00 | Finals |

== Results ==
=== Group A ===
| Pos | Team | Pld | W | L | GF | GA | GD | PF | PA | PD | Pts | Qualification |
|---|---|---|---|---|---|---|---|---|---|---|---|---|
| 1 | Isaac Cruz (MEX) Jorge Olvera (MEX) | 4 | 4 | 0 | 8 | 0 | +8 | 120 | 28 | +92 | 12 | Advance to Gold medal match |
| 2 | Omar Espinoza (USA) Salvador Espinoza (USA) | 4 | 3 | 1 | 6 | 2 | +4 | 98 | 81 | +17 | 10 | Advance to Gold medal match |
| 3 | Lorenzo Cardozo (ARG) Emiliano García (ARG) | 4 | 2 | 2 | 4 | 5 | −1 | 92 | 108 | −16 | 8 | Advance to Bronze medal match |
| 4 | Julián González (CHI) Jesús García (CHI) (H) | 4 | 1 | 3 | 2 | 6 | −4 | 76 | 116 | −40 | 6 | Advance to Bronze medal match |
| 5 | Juan Bezada (PER) David Yupanqui (PER) | 4 | 0 | 4 | 1 | 8 | −7 | 76 | 129 | −53 | 4 | |

Source: Santiago 2023
(H) Host

| Date | Time | Player 1 | Score | Player 2 | Game 1 | Game 2 | Game 3 | Report |
|---|---|---|---|---|---|---|---|---|
| October 31 | 17:07 | Omar Espinoza (United States); Salvador Espinoza (United States) | 0–2 | (Mexico) Isaac Cruz (Mexico) Jorge Olvera | 5–15 | 3–15 | | Report |
| October 31 | 18:53 | Lorenzo Cardozo (Argentina); Emiliano García (Argentina) | 2-1 | (Peru) Juan Bezada (Peru) David Yupanqui | 14–15 | 15–10 | 10–3 | Report |
| November 1 | 17:15 | Omar Espinoza (United States); Salvador Espinoza (United States) | 2–0 | (Argentina) Lorenzo Cardozo (Argentina) Emiliano García | 15–13 | 15–5 | | Report |
| November 1 | 18:10 | Isaac Cruz (Mexico); Jorge Olvera (Mexico) | 2–0 | (Chile) Julián González (Chile) Jesús García | 15–5 | 15–1 | | Report |
| November 2 | 16:30 | Julián González (Chile); Jesús García (Chile) | 0–2 | (United States) Omar Espinoza (United States) Salvador Espinoza | 12–15 | 8–15 | | Report |
| November 2 | 17:23 | Juan Bezada (Peru); David Yupanqui (Peru) | 0–2 | (Mexico) Isaac Cruz (Mexico) Jorge Olvera | 3–15 | 6–15 | | Report |
| November 3 | 16:49 | Juan Bezada (Peru); David Yupanqui (Peru) | 0–2 | (United States) Omar Espinoza (United States) Salvador Espinoza | 8–15 | 5–15 | | Report |
| November 3 | 18:31 | Julián González (Chile); Jesús García (Chile) | 0–2 | (Argentina) Lorenzo Cardozo (Argentina) Emiliano García | 8–15 | 12–15 | | Report |
| November 4 | 17:08 | Isaac Cruz (Mexico); Jorge Olvera (Mexico) | 2–0 | (Argentina) Lorenzo Cardozo (Argentina) Emiliano García | 15–2 | 15–3 | | Report |
| November 4 | 19:04 | Juan Bezada (Peru); David Yupanqui (Peru) | 0–2 | (Chile) Julián González (Chile) Jesús García | 13–15 | 13–15 | | Report |

=== Bronze medal match ===
| Date | Time | Player 1 | Score | Player 2 | Game 1 | Game 2 | Game 3 | Report |
|---|---|---|---|---|---|---|---|---|
| November 5 | 10:04 | Lorenzo Cardozo (Argentina); Emiliano García (Argentina) | 2–0 | (Chile) Julián González (Chile) Jesús García | 15–9 | 15–8 | | Report |

=== Gold medal match ===
| Date | Time | Player 1 | Score | Player 2 | Game 1 | Game 2 | Game 3 | Report |
|---|---|---|---|---|---|---|---|---|
| November 5 | 13:40 | Isaac Cruz (Mexico); Jorge Olvera (Mexico) | 2-0 | (United States) Omar Espinoza (United States) Salvador Espinoza | 15–5 | 15–7 | | Report |

== Final standings ==
| Rank | Nation | Name |
|---|---|---|
| 1st place, gold medalist(s) | Mexico | Isaac Cruz; Jorge Olvera |
| 2nd place, silver medalist(s) | United States | Omar Espinoza; Salvador Espinoza |
| 3rd place, bronze medalist(s) | Argentina | Lorenzo Cardozo; Emiliano García |
| 4 | Chile | Julián González; Jesús García |
| 5 | Peru | Juan Bezada; David Yupanqui |
