= Basque pelota at the 2023 Pan American Games – Women's individual fronton rubber ball =

Women's individual fronton rubber ball at the 2023 Pan American Games
- Venue: Spanish Stadium (es)
- Dates: October 31 - November 4
- Competitors: 5 from 5 nations

Medalists
Gold medal	Marifer Noriega	Mexico
Silver medal	Sabrina Andrade	Argentina
Bronze medal	Rosario Valderrama	Chile

The women's individual fronton rubber ball competition of the basque pelota events at the 2023 Pan American Games was held from October 31 to November 4 at Spanish Stadium in Santiago, Chile.

== Schedule ==
Date	Time	Round
October 31, 2023 - November 3, 2023	12:00	Group A Matches
November 4, 2023	10:00	Finals

== Results ==
=== Group A ===
Pos	Player	Pld	W	L	GF	GA	GD	PF	PA	PD	Pts	Qualification
1	Marifer Noriega (MEX)	4	4	0	8	2	+6	131	75	+56	12	Advance to Gold medal match
2	Sabrina Andrade (ARG)	4	3	1	7	2	+5	125	65	+60	10	Advance to Gold medal match
3	Laura Álvarez (CUB)	4	2	2	4	5	−1	88	83	+5	8	Advance to Bronze medal match
4	Rosario Valderrama (CHI) (H)	4	1	3	4	6	−2	90	118	−28	6	Advance to Bronze medal match
5	Macarena Morell (URU)	4	0	4	0	8	−8	27	120	−93	4	

Source: Santiago 2023
(H) Host

Date	Time	Player 1	Score	Player 2	Game 1	Game 2	Game 3	Report
October 31	12:25	Marifer Noriega (Mexico)	2–0	(Cuba) Laura Álvarez	15–7	15–5		Report
October 31	13:48	Rosario Valderrama (Chile)	0-2	(Argentina) Sabrina Andrade	8–15	12–15		Report
November 1	13:07	Marifer Noriega (Mexico)	2–1	(Chile) Rosario Valderrama	14–15	15–5	10–5	Report
November 1	13:46	Laura Álvarez (Cuba)	2–0	(Uruguay) Macarena Morell	15–5	15–3		Report
November 2	11:21	Macarena Morell (Uruguay)	0–2	(Mexico) Marifer Noriega	1–15	2–15		Report
November 2	12:23	Sabrina Andrade (Argentina)	2–0	(Cuba) Laura Álvarez	15–6	15–3		Report
November 2	20:36	Macarena Morell (Uruguay)	0–2	(Chile) Rosario Valderrama	7–15	5–15		Report
November 2	21:50	Sabrina Andrade (Argentina)	1–2	(Mexico) Marifer Noriega	11–15	15–7	9–10	Report
November 3	12:41	Laura Álvarez (Cuba)	2–1	(Chile) Rosario Valderrama	12–15	15–0	10–0	Report
November 3	13:19	Macarena Morell (Uruguay)	0–2	(Argentina) Sabrina Andrade	2–15	2–15		Report

=== Bronze medal match ===
Date	Time	Player 1	Score	Player 2	Game 1	Game 2	Game 3	Report
November 4	10:32	Laura Álvarez (Cuba)	0–2	(Chile) Rosario Valderrama	8–15	3–15		Report

=== Gold medal match ===
Date	Time	Player 1	Score	Player 2	Game 1	Game 2	Game 3	Report
November 4	12:50	Marifer Noriega (Mexico)	2–0	(Argentina) Sabrina Andrade	15–14	15–8		Report

== Final standings ==
Rank	Name	Nationality
1st place, gold medalist(s)	Marifer Noriega	Mexico
2nd place, silver medalist(s)	Sabrina Andrade	Argentina
3rd place, bronze medalist(s)	Rosario Valderrama	Chile
4	Laura Álvarez	Cuba
5	Macarena Morell	Uruguay
