= Basque pelota at the 2023 Pan American Games – Women's doubles trinquete rubber ball =

Women's doubles trinquete rubber ball at the 2023 Pan American Games
- Venue: Spanish Stadium
- Dates: October 31 - November 5
- Competitors: 10 from 5 nations

Medalists
Gold medal	María García; Cynthia Pinto	Argentina
Silver medal	Dulce Figueroa; Laura Puentes	Mexico
Bronze medal	Sofía Vicente; Agustina Cuestas	Uruguay

The women's doubles trinquete rubber ball competition of the basque pelota events at the 2023 Pan American Games was held from October 31 to November 5 at Spanish Stadium in Las Condes, Chile.

== Schedule ==
Date	Time	Round
October 31, 2023 - November 4, 2023	19:00	Group A Matches
November 5, 2023	10:00	Finals

== Results ==
=== Group A ===
Pos	Team	Pld	W	L	GF	GA	GD	PF	PA	PD	Pts	Qualification
1	María García (ARG) Cynthia Pinto (ARG)	4	4	0	8	0	+8	120	45	+75	12	Advance to Gold medal match
2	Dulce Figueroa (MEX) Laura Puentes (MEX)	4	3	1	6	2	+4	113	59	+54	10	Advance to Gold medal match
3	Sofía Vicente (URU) Agustina Cuestas (URU)	4	2	2	4	5	−1	84	100	−16	8	Advance to Bronze medal match
4	Maritxu Bastarrica (CHI) Emilia Domínguez (CHI) (H)	4	1	3	3	6	−3	81	104	−23	6	Advance to Bronze medal match
5	Carla Castillo (VEN) Fátima Arellano (VEN)	4	0	4	0	8	−8	30	120	−90	4	

Source: Santiago 2023
(H) Host

Date	Time	Player 1	Score	Player 2	Game 1	Game 2	Game 3	Report
October 31	20:49	María García (Argentina); Cynthia Pinto (Argentina)	2–0	(Mexico) Dulce Figueroa (Mexico) Laura Puentes	15–13	15–10		Report
October 31	21:53	Sofía Vicente (Uruguay); Agustina Cuestas (Uruguay)	2-1	(Chile) Maritxu Bastarrica (Chile) Emilia Domínguez	6–15	15–13	10–5	Report
November 1	19:54	María García (Argentina); Cynthia Pinto (Argentina)	2–0	(Uruguay) Sofía Vicente (Uruguay) Agustina Cuestas	15–8	15–3		Report
November 1	20:29	Dulce Figueroa (Mexico); Laura Puentes (Mexico)	2–0	(Venezuela) Carla Castillo (Venezuela) Fátima Arellano	15–1	15–4		Report
November 2	20:09	Carla Castillo (Venezuela); Fátima Arellano (Venezuela)	0–2	(Argentina) María García (Argentina) Cynthia Pinto	3–15	2–15		Report
November 2	20:57	Maritxu Bastarrica (Chile); Emilia Domínguez (Chile)	0–2	(Mexico) Dulce Figueroa (Mexico) Laura Puentes	11–15	1–15		Report
November 3	19:20	Carla Castillo (Venezuela); Fátima Arellano (Venezuela)	0–2	(Uruguay) Sofía Vicente (Uruguay) Agustina Cuestas	5–15	2–15		Report
November 3	20:18	Maritxu Bastarrica (Chile); Emilia Domínguez (Chile)	0–2	(Argentina) María García (Argentina) Cynthia Pinto	4–15	2–15		Report
November 4	20:20	Dulce Figueroa (Mexico); Laura Puentes (Mexico)	2–0	(Uruguay) Sofía Vicente (Uruguay) Agustina Cuestas	15–7	15–5		Report
November 4	20:57	Maritxu Bastarrica (Chile); Emilia Domínguez (Chile)	2–0	(Venezuela) Carla Castillo (Venezuela) Fátima Arellano	15–3	15–10		Report

=== Bronze medal match ===
Date	Time	Player 1	Score	Player 2	Game 1	Game 2	Game 3	Report
November 5	11:11	Sofía Vicente (Uruguay); Agustina Cuestas (Uruguay)	2-1	(Chile) Maritxu Bastarrica (Chile) Emilia Domínguez	13–15	15–4	10–0	Report

=== Gold medal match ===
Date	Time	Player 1	Score	Player 2	Game 1	Game 2	Game 3	Report
November 5	12:29	María García (Argentina); Cynthia Pinto (Argentina)	2-0	(Mexico) Dulce Figueroa (Mexico) Laura Puentes	15–10	15–10		Report

== Final standings ==
Rank	Nation	Name
1st place, gold medalist(s)	Argentina	María García; Cynthia Pinto
2nd place, silver medalist(s)	Mexico	Dulce Figueroa; Laura Puentes
3rd place, bronze medalist(s)	Uruguay	Sofía Vicente; Agustina Cuestas
4	Chile	Maritxu Bastarrica; Emilia Domínguez
5	Venezuela	Carla Castillo; Fátima Arellano
