= Javier Saiz =

Argentine basketball player

No. 14 – San Martín
- Position: Power forward / center
- League: LNB

Personal information
- Born: February 26, 1994 (age 32) Córdoba, Argentina
- Listed height: 6 ft 9 in (2.06 m)
- Listed weight: 235 lb (107 kg)

Career information
- Playing career: 2014–present

Career history
- 2014–2020: Regatas Corrientes
- 2020–present: San Martín
Medals
Men's basketball
Representing Argentina
FIBA AmeriCup
Silver medal – second place	2017 Argentina

Javier Saiz (born February 26, 1994) is an Argentine professional basketball player for San Martín. At a height of 2.06 metres (6 feet 9 inches) tall, he plays at both the power forward and center positions.

== Professional career ==
In his pro career, Saiz has played in the 1st-tier level FIBA Americas League.

== National team career ==
Saiz has been a member of the senior Argentine national team. With Argentina, he played at the 2017 FIBA AmeriCup, where he won a silver medal.
