= Basque pelota at the 2023 Pan American Games – Qualification =

The following is the qualification system and qualified countries for the Basque pelota at the 2023 Pan American Games competitions.

== Qualification system ==
A total of 66 athletes (33 per gender) will qualify to compete. Each nation may enter a maximum of 12 athletes (six per gender). The host country (Chile) automatically qualified a full team of 12 athletes. There will be a total of two qualification events. The best ranked country of the Americas in each event of the Biarritz 2022 Absolute World Basque Pelota Championship will secure a spot. The second event is the 2023 Pan American Basque Pelota Tournament, in which 21 men and 21 women will be qualified.

== Qualification timeline ==
Events	Date	Venue
2022 Basque Pelota World Championships	October 23–29, 2022	(France) Biarritz
Pan American Basque Pelota Tournament	April 17–22, 2023	(Peru) Lima

== Qualification summary ==
Nation	Men				Women				Total
Nation	Trinquete	Fronton	Frontenis	Frontball	Trinquete	Fronton	Frontenis	Frontball	Total
Argentina	2	1	2	1	2	1		1	10
Bolivia		1						1	2
Brazil				1					1
Chile	2	1	2	1	2	1	2	1	12
Costa Rica								1	1
Cuba		1		1		1	2	1	6
Guatemala								1	1
Mexico	2	1	2	1	2	1	2	1	12
Peru	2		2	1			2		7
United States			2	1					3
Uruguay	2			1	2	1		1	7
Venezuela					2		2		4
Total: 12 NOCs	10	5	10	8	10	5	10	8	66

== Men ==
=== Doubles trinquete rubber ball ===
Competition	Athlete(s) per NOC	Qualified
Host nation	2	Chile
2022 Basque Pelota World Championships	2	Argentina
Pan American Basque Pelota Tournament	6	Mexico; Uruguay; Peru
TOTAL	10	

=== Individual fronton rubber ball ===
Competition	Athlete(s) per NOC	Qualified
Host nation	1	Chile
2022 Basque Pelota World Championships	1	Mexico
Pan American Basque Pelota Tournament	3	Argentina; Bolivia; Cuba
TOTAL	5	

=== Doubles frontenis ===
Competition	Athlete(s) per NOC	Qualified
Host nation	1	Chile
2022 Basque Pelota World Championships	2	United States
Pan American Basque Pelota Tournament	6	Mexico; Argentina; Peru
TOTAL	10	

=== Frontball ===
Competition	Athlete(s) per NOC	Qualified
Host nation	1	Chile
2022 Basque Pelota World Championships	1	Mexico
Pan American Basque Pelota Tournament	6	Cuba; Argentina; Brazil; United States; Uruguay; Peru
TOTAL	8	

== Women ==
=== Doubles trinquete rubber ball ===
Competition	Vacancies	Qualified
Host nation	2	Chile
2022 Basque Pelota World Championships	2	Argentina
Pan American Basque Pelota Tournament	6	Mexico; Uruguay; Venezuela
TOTAL	10	

=== Individual fronton rubber ball ===
Competition	Vacancies	Qualified
Host nation	1	Chile
2022 Basque Pelota World Championships	1	Mexico
Pan American Basque Pelota Tournament	3	Cuba; Argentina; Uruguay
TOTAL	5	

=== Doubles frontenis ===
Competition	Vacancies	Qualified
Host nation	2	Chile
2022 Basque Pelota World Championships	2	Mexico
Pan American Basque Pelota Tournament	6	Cuba; Peru; Venezuela
TOTAL	10	

=== Frontball ===
Competition	Vacancies	Qualified
Host nation	1	Chile
2022 Basque Pelota World Championships	1	Mexico
Pan American Basque Pelota Tournament	6	Uruguay; Bolivia; Argentina; Cuba; Costa Rica; Guatemala
TOTAL	8	
