= Basque pelota at the 2023 Pan American Games – Men's frontball =

Men's individual frontball at the 2023 Pan American Games
- Venue: Spanish Stadium
- Dates: October 31 - November 4
- Competitors: 8 from 8 nations

Medalists
Gold medal	David Alvarez	Mexico
Silver medal	Cristian Abréu	Cuba
Bronze medal	Filipe Otheguy	Brazil

The men's individual frontball competition of the basque pelota events at the 2023 Pan American Games was held from October 31 to November 4 at Spanish Stadium in Las Condes, Chile.

== Schedule ==
Date	Time	Round
October 31, 2023 - November 2, 2023	09:00	Group A Matches
October 31, 2023 - November 2, 2023	11:00	Group B Matches
November 4, 2023	09:00	Semifinals
November 4, 2023	10:00	Finals

== Results ==
=== Group A ===
Pos	Player	Pld	W	L	GF	GA	GD	PF	PA	PD	Pts	Qualification
1	David Álvarez (MEX)	3	3	0	6	0	+6	72	19	+53	9	Advance to Semifinals
2	Nicolás Comas (ARG)	3	2	1	4	2	+2	55	47	+8	7	Advance to Semifinals
3	Richard Airala (URU)	3	1	2	2	5	−3	38	74	−36	5	
4	Gonzalo Fouilloux (CHI) (H)	3	0	3	1	6	−5	49	74	−25	3	

Source: Santiago 2023
(H) Host

Date	Time	Player 1	Score	Player 2	Game 1	Game 2	Game 3	Report
October 31	09:27	Richard Airala (Uruguay)	0–2	(Mexico) David Álvarez	2–12	1–12		Report
October 31	10:54	Gonzalo Fouilloux (Chile)	0-2	(Argentina) Nicolás Comas	7–12	7–12		Report
November 1	09:30	David Álvarez (Mexico)	2–0	(Chile) Gonzalo Fouilloux	12–4	12–5		Report
November 1	10:46	Richard Airala (Uruguay)	0–2	(Argentina) Nicolás Comas	5–12	4–12		Report
November 2	09:36	David Álvarez (Mexico)	2–0	(Argentina) Nicolás Comas	12–2	12–5		Report
November 2	11:03	Gonzalo Fouilloux (Chile)	1–2	(Uruguay) Richard Airala	11–12	12–7	3–7	Report

=== Group B ===
Pos	Player	Pld	W	L	GF	GA	GD	PF	PA	PD	Pts	Qualification
1	Cristian Abréu (CUB)	3	3	0	6	0	+6	72	27	+45	9	Advance to Semifinals
2	Filipe Otheguy (BRA)	3	2	1	4	2	+2	63	38	+25	7	Advance to Semifinals
3	Jesús Quinto (PER)	3	1	2	2	5	−3	42	72	−30	5	
4	Israel Mateos (USA)	3	0	3	1	6	−5	34	74	−40	3	

Source: Santiago 2023

Date	Time	Player 1	Score	Player 2	Game 1	Game 2	Game 3	Report
October 31	11:29	Jesús Quinto (Peru)	0–2	(Cuba) Cristian Abréu	2–12	4–12		Report
October 31	12:26	Israel Mateos (United States)	0-2	(Brazil) Filipe Otheguy	3–12	1–12		Report
November 1	11:27	Cristian Abréu (Cuba)	2–0	(United States) Israel Mateos	12–4	12–2		Report
November 1	12:35	Filipe Otheguy (Brazil)	2–0	(Peru) Jesús Quinto	12–5	12–5		Report
November 2	11:59	Cristian Abréu (Cuba)	2–0	(Brazil) Filipe Otheguy	12–5	12–10		Report
November 2	12:56	Israel Mateos (United States)	1–2	(Peru) Jesús Quinto	12–7	9–12	3–7	Report

== Knockout stage ==
Semifinals
A1	David Álvarez (MEX)	12	12
B2	Filipe Otheguy (BRA)	6	4
B1	Cristian Abréu (CUB)	12	12
A2	Nicolás Comas (ARG)	9	7

Final (gold-medal match)
A1	David Álvarez (MEX)	12	12
B1	Cristian Abréu (CUB)	5	0
Bronze-medal match
B2	Filipe Otheguy (BRA)	12	12
A2	Nicolás Comas (ARG)	8	2

== Final standings ==
Rank	Name	Nationality
1st place, gold medalist(s)	David Álvarez	Mexico
2nd place, silver medalist(s)	Cristian Abréu	Cuba
3rd place, bronze medalist(s)	Filipe Otheguy	Brazil
4	Nicolás Comas	Argentina
5	Jesús Quinto	Peru
6	Richard Airala	Uruguay
7	Gonzalo Fouilloux	Chile
8	Israel Mateos	United States
