= Basque pelota at the 2023 Pan American Games – Women's frontball =

Women's individual frontball at the 2023 Pan American Games
- Venue: Spanish Stadium
- Dates: October 31 - November 4
- Competitors: 8 from 8 nations

Medalists
Gold medal	Itzel Reyes	Mexico
Silver medal	Leonella Acosta	Uruguay
Bronze medal	Micaela Cortez	Argentina

The women's individual frontball competition of the basque pelota events at the 2023 Pan American Games was held from October 31 to November 4 at Spanish Stadium in Santiago, Chile.

== Schedule ==
Date	Time	Round
October 31, 2023 - November 2, 2023	09:00	Group A Matches
October 31, 2023 - November 2, 2023	11:00	Group B Matches
November 4, 2023	10:00	Semifinals
November 4, 2023	09:00	Finals

== Group stage ==
=== Group A ===
Pos	Player	Pld	W	L	GF	GA	GD	PF	PA	PD	Pts	Qualification
1	Itzel Reyes (MEX)	3	3	0	6	0	+6	72	24	+48	9	Advance to Semifinals
2	Micaela Cortez (ARG)	3	2	1	4	3	+1	59	55	+4	7	Advance to Semifinals
3	Zita Solas (CHI) (H)	3	1	2	3	4	−1	60	56	+4	5	
4	María Araya (CRC)	3	0	3	0	6	−6	16	72	−56	3	

Source: Santiago 2023
(H) Host

Date	Time	Player 1	Score	Player 2	Game 1	Game 2	Game 3	Report
October 31	09:28	María Araya (Costa Rica)	0–2	(Mexico) Itzel Reyes	1–12	1–12		Report
October 31	10:53	Micaela Cortez (Argentina)	2-1	(Chile) Zita Solas	12–8	6–12	7–4	Report
November 1	09:25	Itzel Reyes (Mexico)	2–0	(Argentina) Micaela Cortez	12–9	12–1		Report
November 1	10:32	María Araya (Costa Rica)	0–2	(Chile) Zita Solas	5–12	2–12		Report
November 2	09:35	Itzel Reyes (Mexico)	2–0	(Chile) Zita Solas	12–6	12–6		Report
November 2	10:27	Micaela Cortez (Argentina)	2–0	(Costa Rica) María Araya	12–5	12–2		Report

=== Group B ===
Pos	Player	Pld	W	L	GF	GA	GD	PF	PA	PD	Pts	Qualification
1	Leonella Acosta (URU)	3	3	0	6	0	+6	72	35	+37	9	Advance to Semifinals
2	Yalieska Leoncio (CUB)	3	2	1	4	3	+1	68	60	+8	7	Advance to Semifinals
3	Julia Estrada (BOL)	3	1	2	3	4	−1	61	67	−6	5	
4	Joana Blas (EAI)	3	0	3	0	6	−6	33	72	−39	3	

Source: Santiago 2023

Date	Time	Player 1	Score	Player 2	Game 1	Game 2	Game 3	Report
October 31	11:31	Joana Blas	0–2	(Uruguay) Leonella Acosta	5–12	4–12		Report
October 31	12:49	Yalieska Leoncio (Cuba)	2-1	(Bolivia) Julia Estrada	11–12	12–7	7–6	Report
November 1	11:37	Leonella Acosta (Uruguay)	2–0	(Cuba) Yalieska Leoncio	12–9	12–5		Report
November 1	12:30	Julia Estrada (Bolivia)	2–0	Joana Blas	12–3	12–10		Report
November 2	11:59	Leonella Acosta (Uruguay)	2–0	(Bolivia) Julia Estrada	12–5	12–7		Report
November 2	12:30	Yalieska Leoncio (Cuba)	2–0	Joana Blas	12–6	12–5		Report

== Knockout stage ==
Semifinals
A1	Itzel Reyes (MEX)	12	12
B2	Yalieska Leoncio (CUB)	0	2
B1	Leonella Acosta (URU)	12	12
A2	Micaela Cortez (ARG)	8	6

Final (gold-medal match)
A1	Itzel Reyes (MEX)	12	12
B1	Leonella Acosta (URU)	4	3
Bronze-medal match
B2	Yalieska Leoncio (CUB)	12	9	2
A2	Micaela Cortez (ARG)	8	12	7

== Final standings ==
Rank	Name	Nationality
1st place, gold medalist(s)	Itzel Reyes	Mexico
2nd place, silver medalist(s)	Leonella Acosta	Uruguay
3rd place, bronze medalist(s)	Micaela Cortez	Argentina
4	Yalieska Leoncio	Cuba
5	Zita Solas	Chile
6	Julia Estrada	Bolivia
7	Joana Blas	Independent Athletes Team
8	María Araya	Costa Rica
