= Basque pelota at the 2023 Pan American Games – Men's individual fronton rubber ball =

Men's individual fronton rubber ball at the 2023 Pan American Games
- Venue: Spanish Stadium (es)
- Dates: October 31 - November 4
- Competitors: 5 from 5 nations

Medalists
| Gold medal | Isaac Pérez | Mexico |
| Silver medal | Federico Fernández | Argentina |
| Bronze medal | Renato Bolelli | Chile |

The men's individual fronton rubber ball competition of the basque pelota events at the 2023 Pan American Games was held from October 31 to November 4 at Spanish Stadium in Santiago, Chile.

== Schedule ==
| Date | Time | Round |
|---|---|---|
| October 31, 2023 - November 3, 2023 | 10:00 | Group A Matches |
| November 4, 2023 | 09:00 | Finals |

== Results ==
=== Group A ===
| Pos | Player | Pld | W | L | GF | GA | GD | PF | PA | PD | Pts | Qualification |
|---|---|---|---|---|---|---|---|---|---|---|---|---|
| 1 | Isaac Pérez (MEX) | 4 | 4 | 0 | 8 | 0 | +8 | 120 | 35 | +85 | 12 | Advance to Gold medal match |
| 2 | Federico Fernández (ARG) | 4 | 3 | 1 | 6 | 2 | +4 | 106 | 51 | +55 | 10 | Advance to Gold medal match |
| 3 | Alejandro González (CUB) | 4 | 2 | 2 | 4 | 4 | 0 | 81 | 80 | +1 | 8 | Advance to Bronze medal match |
| 4 | Renato Bolelli (CHI) (H) | 4 | 1 | 3 | 2 | 6 | −4 | 69 | 90 | −21 | 6 | Advance to Bronze medal match |
| 5 | Carlos Miranda (BOL) | 4 | 0 | 4 | 0 | 8 | −8 | 0 | 120 | −120 | 4 | Withdrew due to injury |

Source: Santiago 2023
(H) Host

| Date | Time | Player 1 | Score | Player 2 | Game 1 | Game 2 | Game 3 | Report |
|---|---|---|---|---|---|---|---|---|
| October 31 | 10:41 | Isaac Pérez (Mexico) | 2–0 | (Argentina) Federico Fernández | 15–11 | 15–5 | | Report |
| October 31 | 11:15 | Carlos Miranda (Bolivia) | 0-WO | (Chile) Renato Bolelli | 0–15 | 0–15 | | Report |
| November 1 | 10:32 | Isaac Pérez (Mexico) | WO–0 | (Bolivia) Carlos Miranda | 15–0 | 15–0 | | Report |
| November 1 | 11:28 | Federico Fernández (Argentina) | 2–0 | (Cuba) Alejandro González | 15–5 | 15–6 | | Report |
| November 2 | 09:28 | Alejandro González (Cuba) | 0–2 | (Mexico) Isaac Pérez | 4–15 | 6–15 | | Report |
| November 2 | 10:39 | Renato Bolelli (Chile) | 0–2 | (Argentina) Federico Fernández | 6–15 | 4–15 | | Report |
| November 2 | 17:08 | Alejandro González (Cuba) | WO–0 | (Bolivia) Carlos Miranda | 15–0 | 15–0 | | Report |
| November 2 | 19:49 | Renato Bolelli (Chile) | 0–2 | (Mexico) Isaac Pérez | 3–15 | 6–15 | | Report |
| November 3 | 09:30 | Federico Fernández (Argentina) | WO–0 | (Bolivia) Carlos Miranda | 15–0 | 15–0 | | Report |
| November 3 | 11:32 | Renato Bolelli (Chile) | 0–2 | (Cuba) Alejandro González | 11–15 | 9–15 | | Report |

=== Bronze medal match ===
| Date | Time | Player 1 | Score | Player 2 | Game 1 | Game 2 | Game 3 | Report |
|---|---|---|---|---|---|---|---|---|
| November 4 | 09:33 | Alejandro González (Cuba) | 0–2 | (Chile) Renato Bolelli | 11–15 | 3–15 | | Report |

=== Gold medal match ===
| Date | Time | Player 1 | Score | Player 2 | Game 1 | Game 2 | Game 3 | Report |
|---|---|---|---|---|---|---|---|---|
| November 4 | 12:50 | Isaac Pérez (Mexico) | 2–0 | (Argentina) Federico Fernández | 15–14 | 15–13 | | Report |

== Final standings ==
| Rank | Name | Nationality |
|---|---|---|
| 1st place, gold medalist(s) | Isaac Pérez | Mexico |
| 2nd place, silver medalist(s) | Federico Fernández | Argentina |
| 3rd place, bronze medalist(s) | Renato Bolelli | Chile |
| 4 | Alejandro González | Cuba |
| 5 | Carlos Miranda | Bolivia |
