= Taekwondo at the 2023 Pan American Games – Qualification =

The following is the qualification system and qualified athletes for the Taekwondo at the 2023 Pan American Games competitions.

== Qualification timeline ==
Events	Date	Venue
2021 Junior Pan American Games	November 26–27	(Colombia) Cali
Pan American Games Qualification Tournament	March 22–23	(Brazil) Rio de Janeiro

== Qualification system ==
A total of 136 taekwondo athletes will qualify to compete. Each nation may enter a maximum of 10 athletes (eight in Kyorugi and two in Poomsae). The host nation, Chile, automatically qualifies the maximum number of athletes (8) and is entered in each event. There will also eight wild card spots awarded in Kyorugi and two in Poomsae. The spots will be awarded at the qualification tournament held in Rio de Janeiro in March 2023.

== Qualification summary ==
A total of 24 nations qualified athletes at the qualification tournament, along with hosts Chile.

NOC	Men					Women					Mixed	Total
NOC	58 kg	68 kg	80 kg	+80 kg	PO I.	49 kg	57 kg	67 kg	+67 kg	PO I.	PO MP.	Total
Argentina	X	X	X	X		X	X					6
Bolivia						X	X					2
Brazil	X	X	X	X			XX	X	X			8
Canada	X	X	X	X	X	X	X	X		X	X	9
Chile	X	X	X	X	X	X	X	X	X	X	X	10
Colombia	X	X	X	X		X		X	X			7
Costa Rica			X			X	X					3
Cuba		X	X	X	X	X		X	X	X	X	8
Dominican Republic	X	X	X					X	X			5
Ecuador	X	X		X	X		X	X	X	X	X	8
El Salvador							X					1
Guatemala	X	X			X					X	X	4
Guyana						X						1
Haiti								X	X			2
Honduras				X								1
Jamaica			X									1
Mexico	X	XX	X	X	X	X	X	XX	X	X	X	12
Nicaragua			X		X					X	X	3
Panama							X					1
Peru	X				X	X	X	X		X	X	6
Puerto Rico	X	X	X		X	X		X	X	X	X	8
Suriname		X										1
United States	X	X	XX	XX	X	X	X	X	XX	X	X	13
Uruguay		X				X						2
Venezuela	X			X		X	X	X	X			6
Total: 24 NOCs	13	15	14	12	10	14	14	14	12	10	10	134

== Kyorugi ==
=== Men's 58 kg ===
Competition	Quotas	Qualified
Host Nation	1	Chile
2021 Junior Pan American Games	1	Jhon Garrido (COL)
Pan American Games Qualification Tournament	~~12~~ 11	Argentina; Brazil; Canada; ~~Colombia~~; Dominican Republic; Ecuador; Guatemala; Mexico; Peru; Puerto Rico; United States; Venezuela
TOTAL	13	

=== Men's 68 kg ===
Competition	Quotas	Qualified
Host Nation	1	Chile
2021 Junior Pan American Games	1	Uriel Ballesteros (MEX)
Pan American Games Qualification Tournament	12	Argentina; Brazil; Canada; Colombia; Cuba; Dominican Republic; Ecuador; Guatemala; Mexico; Puerto Rico; United States; Uruguay
Wild card	1	Suriname
TOTAL	15	

=== Men's 80 kg ===
Competition	Quotas	Qualified
Host Nation	1	Chile
2021 Junior Pan American Games	1	Carl Nickolas (USA)
Pan American Games Qualification Tournament	12	Argentina; Brazil; Canada; Colombia; Costa Rica; Cuba; Dominican Republic; Jamaica; Mexico; Nicaragua; Puerto Rico; United States
TOTAL	14	

=== Men's +80 kg ===
Competition	Quotas	Qualified
Host Nation	1	Chile
2021 Junior Pan American Games	1	Dallas Parker (USA)
Pan American Games Qualification Tournament	10	Argentina; Brazil; Canada; Colombia; Cuba; Ecuador; Honduras; Mexico; United States; Venezuela
TOTAL	12	

=== Women's 49 kg ===
Competition	Quotas	Qualified
Host Nation	1	Chile
2021 Junior Pan American Games	~~1~~ 0	~~Angie Venegas Rodríguez (MEX)~~
Pan American Games Qualification Tournament	12	Argentina; Bolivia; Canada; Colombia; Costa Rica; Cuba; Guyana; Mexico; Peru; Puerto Rico; United States; Venezuela
Wild card	1	Uruguay
TOTAL	14	

=== Women's 57 kg ===
Competition	Quotas	Qualified
Host Nation	1	Chile
2021 Junior Pan American Games	1	Sandy Macedo (BRA)
Pan American Games Qualification Tournament	12	Argentina; Bolivia; Brazil; Canada; Costa Rica; Ecuador; El Salvador; Mexico; Panama; Peru; United States; Venezuela
TOTAL	14	

=== Women's 67 kg ===
Competition	Quotas	Qualified
Host Nation	1	Chile
2021 Junior Pan American Games	1	Leslie Soltero García (MEX)
Pan American Games Qualification Tournament	12	Brazil; Canada; Colombia; Cuba; Dominican Republic; Ecuador; Haiti; Mexico; Peru; Puerto Rico; United States; Venezuela
TOTAL	14	

=== Women's +67 kg ===
Competition	Quotas	Qualified
Host Nation	1	Chile
2021 Junior Pan American Games	1	Alena Viana (USA)
Pan American Games Qualification Tournament	10	Brazil; Colombia; Cuba; Dominican Republic; Ecuador; Haiti; Mexico; Puerto Rico; United States; Venezuela
TOTAL	12	

== Poomsae ==
Competition	Athletes per NOC	Quotas	Qualified
Host Nation	2	2	Chile
Pan American Games Qualification Tournament	2	16	Mexico; Canada; Cuba; Ecuador; United States; Nicaragua; Puerto Rico; Guatemala
Wild Card	2	2	Peru
TOTAL		20	

- Each qualified NOC can enter one male and one female athlete, for a total of two.
