= Racquetball at the 2023 Pan American Games – Qualification =

The following are the qualification system and qualified athletes for the racquetball at the 2023 Pan American Games competitions scheduled to take place between October 21 and 26 at the Racket sports Center.

== Qualification system ==
A total of 48 racquetball athletes will qualify to compete. Each nation may enter a maximum of 4 athletes (two per gender). In each gender there will be a total of 24 athletes qualified, with the 2023 Pan American Championships being used to determine the countries qualified. Chile as host nation qualified the maximum quota automatically.

== Qualification timeline ==
Events	Date	Venue
2023 Pan American Racquetball Championships	April 1–8, 2023	Guatemala City

== Qualification summary ==
The final quota allocation was released on May 26, 2023. A total of 11 NOC's qualified at least one athlete.

NOC	Men	Women	Athletes
Argentina	2	3	5
Bolivia	3	3	6
Canada	2	2	4
Costa Rica	2	2	4
Chile	3	3	6
Cuba	2	2	4
Dominican Republic		2	2
Ecuador	2	2	4
Guatemala	2	2	4
Mexico	3	3	6
United States	3	2	5
Total: 11 NOC's	24	24	48

== Men ==
Event	Athletes per NOC	Total	Qualified
Host nation	3	3	Chile
2023 Pan American Racquetball Championships	3	9	Bolivia; Mexico; United States
2023 Pan American Racquetball Championships	2	12	Argentina; Costa Rica; Canada; Ecuador; Guatemala; Cuba
TOTAL		24	

== Women ==
Event	Athletes per NOC	Total	Qualified
Host nation	~~3~~ 2	~~3~~ 2	Chile
2023 Pan American Racquetball Championships	3	~~9~~ 6	Mexico; ~~Argentina~~; Bolivia
2023 Pan American Racquetball Championships	2	~~12~~ 16	Argentina; Guatemala; United States; ~~Colombia~~; Ecuador; Costa Rica; Canada; Cuba; Dominican Republic
TOTAL		24	

- Chile and Argentina declined one quota each, and Colombia decline two quotas, for an available four additional quotas. These were redistributed to Cuba (2 quotas) and the Dominican Republic (2 quotas).
