= Beach volleyball at the 2023 Pan American Games – Qualification =

The following is the qualification system and qualified athletes for the beach volleyball at the 2023 Pan American Games competitions.

== Qualification system ==
A total of 64 Beach volleyball athletes will qualify to compete. Each nation may enter a maximum of 4 athletes (one team per gender of two athletes). As host nation, Chile automatically qualified a full team of four athletes (one team per gender). The best team per gender from NORCECA (North America, Central America and Caribbean) and CSV (South America) at the 2021 Junior Pan American Games also secured a quota. All other quotas were awarded through rankings (the three best teams per gender in the FIVB World Ranking, followed by five teams per gender from NORCECA and CSV.

== Qualification timeline ==
Event	Date	Venue
2021 Junior Pan American Games	November 30 – December 4, 2021	(Colombia) Cali
FIVB World Ranking	June 30, 2023	—N/a
Continental Tour Ranking	June 30, 2023	—N/a

== Qualification summary ==
A total of 19 countries qualified at least one beach volleyball pair.

NOC	Men	Women	Athletes
Argentina	X	X	4
Bolivia	X		2
Brazil	X	X	4
Canada	X	X	4
Chile	X	X	4
Colombia	X	X	4
Costa Rica	X	X	4
Cuba	X		2
Dominican Republic		X	2
Ecuador	X	X	4
El Salvador	X	X	4
Guatemala	X	X	4
Mexico	X	X	4
Nicaragua	X		2
Paraguay	X	X	4
Peru		X	2
Puerto Rico		X	2
United States	X	X	4
Uruguay	X	X	4
Total: 19 NOC's	16	16	64

== Qualification progress ==
Event/Criteria	Quotas	Men	Women
Host nation	1	Chile	Chile
2021 Junior Pan American Games NORCECA	1	Cuba	Puerto Rico
2021 Junior Pan American Games CSV	1	Brazil	Brazil
World Rankings	3	United States; Argentina; Canada	United States; Canada; Paraguay
NORCECA Rankings	5	Mexico; Guatemala; Costa Rica; El Salvador; Nicaragua	Mexico; Guatemala; Dominican Republic; El Salvador; Costa Rica
CSV Rankings	5	Ecuador; Uruguay; Paraguay; Colombia; Bolivia	Argentina; Ecuador; Peru; Colombia; Uruguay
Total	16	16	16
