= Racquetball at the 2023 Pan American Games – Men's singles =

Men's singles at the 2023 Pan American Games
- Venue: Racket Sports Center
- Dates: October 21 - October 24
- Competitors: 20 from 10 nations

Medalists
Gold medal	Conrrado Moscoso	Bolivia
Silver medal	Carlos Keller	Bolivia
Bronze medal	Eduardo Portillo	Mexico
Bronze medal	Rodrigo Montoya	Mexico

The men's singles competition of the racquetball events at the 2023 Pan American Games will be held from October 21 to 24 at Racket Sports Center in Santiago, Chile.

== Schedule ==
Date	Time	Round
October 21, 2023	10:00	Round of 32
October 22, 2023	11:30	Round of 16
October 23, 2023	10:00	Quarterfinals
October 23, 2023	12:00	Semifinals
October 24, 2023	11:00	Finals

== Results ==
Round of 32 (October 21)
Maykel Moyet (CUB)	3
Juan Salvatierra (EAI)	1
José Ugalde (ECU)	3
Rafael Gatica (CHI)	0
Jaime Mansilla (CHI)	0
Juan Cueva (ECU)	3
Edwin Galicia (EAI)	3
Yandy Espinosa (CUB)	0

Round of 16 (October 22)
Conrrado Moscoso (BOL)	3
Maykel Moyet (CUB)	0
Andrés Acuña (CRC)	3
Coby Iwaasa (CAN)	0
Daniel de la Rosa (USA)	3
Fernando Kurzbard (ARG)	0
José Ugalde (ECU)	2
Eduardo Portillo (MEX)	3
Rodrigo Montoya (MEX)	3
Juan Cueva (ECU)	1
Diego García (ARG)	1
Adam Manilla (USA)	3
Samuel Murray (CAN)	3
Gabriel Garcia (CRC)	0
Edwin Galicia (EAI)	0
Carlos Keller (BOL)	3

Quarterfinals (October 23)
Conrrado Moscoso (BOL)	3
Andrés Acuña (CRC)	0
Daniel de la Rosa (USA)	2
Eduardo Portillo (MEX)	3
Rodrigo Montoya (MEX)	3
Adam Manilla (USA)	2
Samuel Murray (CAN)	1
Carlos Keller (BOL)	3

Semifinals (October 23)
Conrrado Moscoso (BOL)	3
Eduardo Portillo (MEX)	0
Rodrigo Montoya (MEX)	2
Carlos Keller (BOL)	3

Final (October 24)
Conrrado Moscoso (BOL)	3
Carlos Keller (BOL)	0
