= 2023 Pan American Games Parade of Nations =

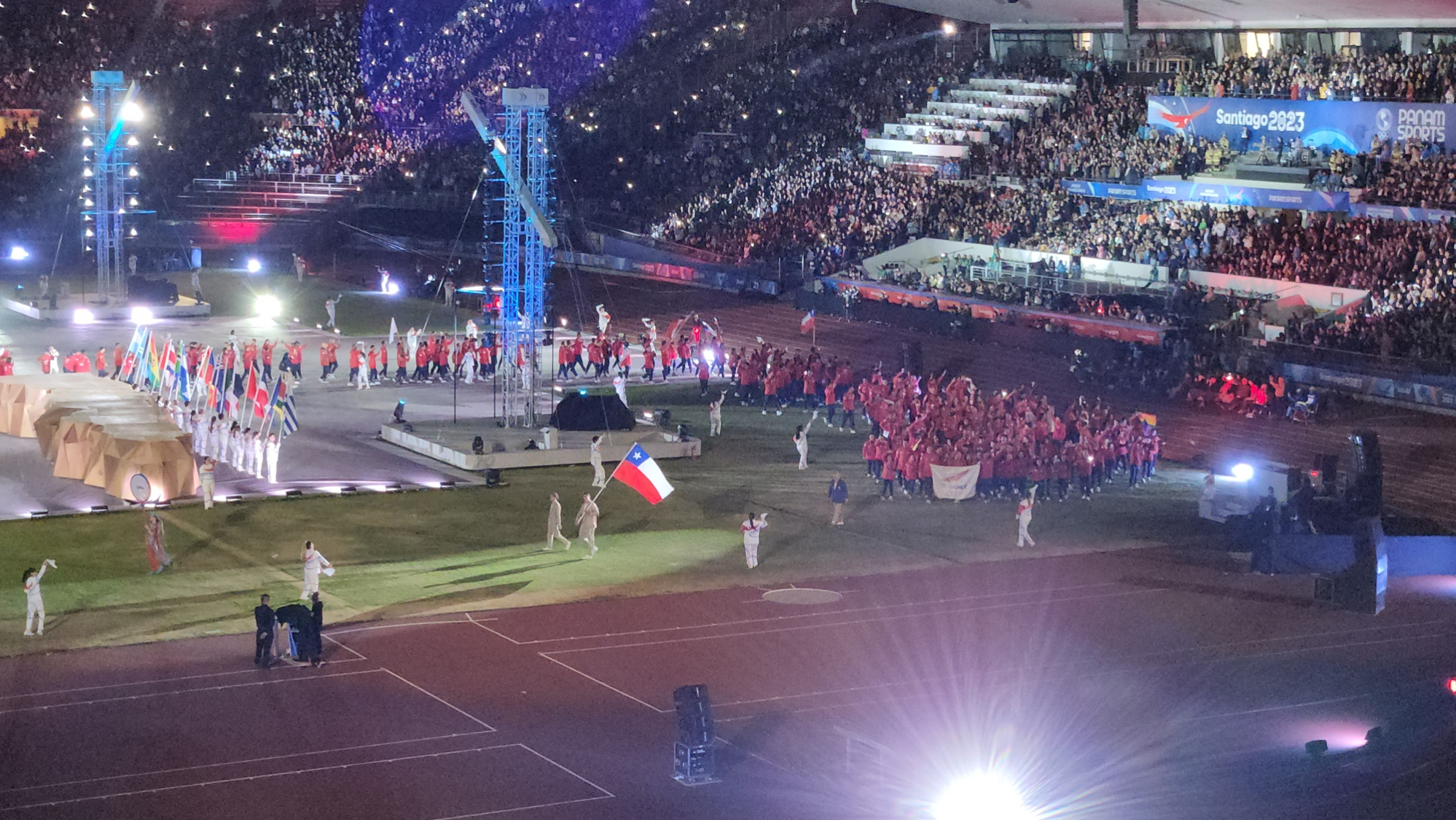
Chile's delegation at the 2023 Pan American Games Parade of Nations

During the Parade of Nations at the 2023 Pan American Games opening ceremony, on October 20, 2023, athletes bearing the flags of their respective nations lead their national delegations as they paraded into National stadium in the host city of Santiago, Chile.

For the first time, each team had the option to allow two flag bearers, one male and one female. This was first done at the 2020 Summer Olympics, in an effort to promote gender equality.

== March order ==
Athletes entered the stadium in an order dictated by tradition. As the host of the first Pan American Games, Argentina entered first. The Chilean delegation entered last, representing the host nation. The remaining countries entered in Spanish alphabetical order as per Pan American Sports Organization protocol.

== List ==
Order	Nation	Spanish	Flag bearer	Sport	Ref.
1	Argentina	Argentina	Marcos Moneta	Rugby sevens	
1	Argentina	Argentina	Sabrina Ameghino	Canoeing	
2	Antigua and Barbuda	Antigua y Barbuda	Tiger Tyson	Sailing	
3	Aruba	Aruba	Mikel Schreuders	Swimming	
3	Aruba	Aruba	Shanayah Howell	Cycling	
4	Independent Athletes Team	Equipo de Atletas Independientes	Emilio Flores	Sport climbing	
4	Independent Athletes Team	Equipo de Atletas Independientes	Lucero Mejia	Swimming	
5	Bahamas	Bahamas	Lamar Taylor	Swimming	
5	Bahamas	Bahamas	Zaylie-Elizabeth Thompson	Swimming	
6	Barbados	Barbados	Kennie King	Badminton	
6	Barbados	Barbados	Michelle Elliot	Shooting	
7	Belize	Belice	Trent Hardwick	Sailing	
7	Belize	Belice	Ashantie Carr	Athletics	
8	Bermuda	Bermuda	Conor White	Cycling	
8	Bermuda	Bermuda	Emma Harvey	Swimming	
9	Bolivia	Bolivia	Conrrado Moscoso	Racquetball	
9	Bolivia	Bolivia	Noelia Zeballos	Tennis	
10	Brazil	Brasil	Luisa Stefani	Tennis	
10	Brazil	Brasil	Fernando Scheffer	Swimming	
11	Canada^{[a]}	Canadá	Melissa Humana-Paredes	Beach volleyball	
11	Canada^{[a]}	Canadá	Brandie Wilkerson	Beach volleyball	
12	Colombia	Colombia	Miguel Trejos	Taekwondo	
12	Colombia	Colombia	Yeni Arias	Boxing	
13	Costa Rica	Costa Rica	Andrés Acuña	Racquetball	
13	Costa Rica	Costa Rica	Nishy Lee Lindo	Taekwondo	
14	Cuba	Cuba	Julio César La Cruz	Boxing	
14	Cuba	Cuba	Idalys Ortiz	Judo	
15	Dominica	Dominica	Delroy Charles	Boxing	
16	Ecuador	Ecuador	Richard Carapaz	Cycling	
16	Ecuador	Ecuador	Angie Palacios	Weightlifting	
17	El Salvador	El Salvador	Amado de Jesús Alvarado	Surfing	
17	El Salvador	El Salvador	Sindy Portillo	Surfing	
18	United States	Estados Unidos de América	Vincent Hancock	Shooting	
18	United States	Estados Unidos de América	Jordan Chiles	Gymnastics	
19	Grenada	Granada	Zackary Gresham	Swimming	
19	Grenada	Granada	Tilly Collymore	Swimming	
20	Guyana	Guyana	Desmond Amsterdam	Boxing	
20	Guyana	Guyana	Priyanna Ramdhani	Badminton	
21	Haiti	Haití	Jackson Darrius	Boxing	
21	Haiti	Haití	Aliyah Shipman	Taekwondo	
22	Honduras	Honduras	Julio Horrego	Swimming	
22	Honduras	Honduras	Natalie Espinal	Tennis	
23	Cayman Islands	Islas Caimán	James Allison	Swimming	
23	Cayman Islands	Islas Caimán	Sierrah Broadbelt	Swimming	
24	Virgin Islands	Islas Vírgenes	Adriel Sanes	Swimming	
24	Virgin Islands	Islas Vírgenes	Natalia Kuipers	Swimming	
25	British Virgin Islands	Islas Vírgenes Británicas	Deya Erickson	Athletics	
26	Jamaica	Jamaica	Samuel Ricketts	Badminton	
26	Jamaica	Jamaica	Tyesha Mattis	Gymnastics	
27	Mexico	México	Carlos Sansores	Taekwondo	
27	Mexico	México	Karina Esquer	Basketball	
28	Nicaragua	Nicaragua	Orlando Vásquez	Weightlifting	
28	Nicaragua	Nicaragua	Sema Ludrick	Weightlifting	
29	Panama	Panamá	Davis Romero	Baseball	
29	Panama	Panamá	Hillary Heron	Gymnastics	
30	Paraguay	Paraguay	Derlis Ayala	Athletics	
30	Paraguay	Paraguay	Agua Marina Espínola	Cycling	
31	Peru	Perú	Nicolás Pacheco	Shooting	
31	Peru	Perú	María Fernanda Reyes	Surfing	
32	Puerto Rico	Puerto Rico	Jean Pizarro	Archery	
32	Puerto Rico	Puerto Rico	María Pérez	Judo	
33	Dominican Republic	República Dominicana	Robert Pigozzi	Water skiing	
33	Dominican Republic	República Dominicana	Yvonne Losos de Muñiz	Equestrian	
34	Saint Kitts and Nevis	San Cristóbal y Nieves	Nadale Buntin	Athletics	
34	Saint Kitts and Nevis	San Cristóbal y Nieves	Arina Valitova	Tennis	
36	Saint Vincent and the Grenadines	San Vicente y las Granadinas	Nikolas Sylvester	Swimming	
36	Saint Vincent and the Grenadines	San Vicente y las Granadinas	Kennice Greene	Swimming	
35	Saint Lucia	Santa Lucía	Luc Chevrier	Sailing	
37	Suriname	Surinam	Irvin Hoost	Swimming	
37	Suriname	Surinam	Kaelyn Djoparto	Swimming	
38	Trinidad and Tobago	Trinidad y Tobago	Nicholas Paul	Cycling	
38	Trinidad and Tobago	Trinidad y Tobago	Tiana Guy	Boxing	
39	Uruguay	Uruguay	Rodrigo Chagas	Football	
39	Uruguay	Uruguay	Camila Piñeiro	Boxing	
40	Venezuela	Venezuela	Keydomar Vallenilla	Weightlifting	
40	Venezuela	Venezuela	Joselyn Brea	Athletics	
41	Chile	Chile	Esteban Grimalt	Beach volleyball	
41	Chile	Chile	Kristel Köbrich	Swimming	

== Notes ==
- ^{[a]} Both of the Canadian flagbearers were women.
