= Racquetball at the 2023 Pan American Games – Women's doubles =

Women's doubles at the 2023 Pan American Games
- Venue: Racket Sports Center
- Dates: October 21 - October 24
- Competitors: 20 from 10 nations

Medalists
Gold medal	Gabriela Martinez; María Rodríguez	Independent Athletes Team
Silver medal	Natalia Mendez; Maria Jose Vargas	Argentina
Bronze medal	Angélica Barrios; Jenny Daza	Bolivia
Bronze medal	Alexandra Herrera; Montserrat Mejia	Mexico

The women's doubles competition of the racquetball events at the 2023 Pan American Games will be held from October 21 to 24 at Racket Sports Center in Santiago, Chile.

== Schedule ==
Date	Time	Round
October 21, 2023	16:00	Round of 16
October 22, 2023	15:00	Quarterfinals
October 23, 2023	16:00	Semifinals
October 24, 2023	13:00	Finals

== Results ==
Round of 16 (October 21)
Jimena Gómez (CRC); Maricruz Ortiz (CRC)	1
Michelle Morissette (CAN); Frédérique Lambert (CAN)	3
Merynanyelly Delgado (DOM); María Céspedes (DOM)	0
Verónica Sotomayor (ECU); María José Muñoz (ECU)	3
Paula Mansilla (CHI); Carla Muñoz (CHI)	3
Kylie Larduet (CUB); Samira Ferrer (CUB)	0

Quarterfinals (October 22)
Montserrat Mejía (MEX); Alexandra Herrera (MEX)	3
Michelle Morissette (CAN); Frédérique Lambert (CAN)	0
Erika Manilla (USA); Michelle Key (USA)	1
María José Vargas (ARG); Natalia Méndez (ARG)	3
Angélica Barrios (BOL); Jenny Daza (BOL)	3
Verónica Sotomayor (ECU); María José Muñoz (ECU)	2
Paula Mansilla (CHI); Carla Muñoz (CHI)	0
Gabriela Martínez (EAI); María Rodríguez (EAI)	3

Semifinals (October 23)
Montserrat Mejía (MEX); Alexandra Herrera (MEX)	2
María José Vargas (ARG); Natalia Méndez (ARG)	3
Angélica Barrios (BOL); Jenny Daza (BOL)	1
Gabriela Martínez (EAI); María Rodríguez (EAI)	3

Final (October 24)
María José Vargas (ARG); Natalia Méndez (ARG)	1
Gabriela Martínez (EAI); María Rodríguez (EAI)	3
