= Racquetball at the 2023 Pan American Games – Women's team =

Racquetball – Women's team at the 2023 Pan American Games
- Venue: Racket Sports Center
- Start date: October 24, 2023
- End date: October 26, 2023

Medalists
Gold medal	Paola Longoria; Montserrat Mejia; Alexandra Herrera	Mexico
Silver medal	Natalia Mendez; María José Vargas	Argentina
Bronze medal	Erika Manilla; Michelle Key	United States
Bronze medal	Gabriela Martinez; María Renée Rodríguez	Independent Athletes Team

The Women's Team racquetball competition at the 2023 Pan American Games in Santiago, Chile will be held between October 24 and 26 at the Racket Sports Center.

== Schedule ==
Date	Time	Round
October 24, 2023	17:00	First Round
October 25, 2023	10:00	Quarterfinals
October 25, 2023	14:00	Semifinals
October 26, 2023	11:00	Final

== Playoffs ==
First Round
9	Canada	3	0	3
8	Chile	0	3	0
11	Cuba	0	0
6	Costa Rica	3	3
7	Ecuador	1	3	1
10	Dominican Republic	3	0	3

Quarterfinals
1	Mexico	3	3
9	Canada	0	2
5	United States	3	3
4	Bolivia	2	0
3	Independent Athletes Team	0	3	3
6	Costa Rica	3	0	0
10	Dominican Republic	0	0
2	Argentina	3	3

Semifinals
1	Mexico	3	3
5	United States	0	1
3	Independent Athletes Team	0	0
2	Argentina	3	3

Final
1	Mexico	0	3	3
2	Argentina	3	0	0
