= Badminton at the 2023 Pan American Games – Women's singles =

Badminton – Women's singles at the 2023 Pan American Games
- Venue: Olympic Training Center
- Start date: October 21, 2023
- End date: October 25, 2023
- Competitors: 35 from 19 nations

Medalists
| Gold medal | Beiwen Zhang | United States |
| Silver medal | Jennie Gai | United States |
| Bronze medal | Rachel Chan | Canada |
| Bronze medal | Taymara Oropesa | Cuba |

The women's singles badminton event at the 2023 Pan American Games was held from October 21 to 25 at the Olympic Training Center, located in Ñuñoa, a suburb of Santiago. The defending Pan American Games champion is Michelle Li of Canada, who did not compete.

Each National Olympic Committee could enter a maximum of three athletes into the competition. The athletes will be drawn into an elimination stage draw. Once an athlete lost a match, they will be no longer able to compete. Each match will be contested as the best of three games. A total of 35 athletes from 19 NOC's competed.

== Qualification ==
A total of 90 athletes (45 men and 45 women) qualified to compete at the games. A nation may enter a maximum of four athletes per gender (five if qualified through the 2021 Junior Pan American Games. As host nation, Chile automatically qualified a full team of eights athletes. All other quotas will be awarded through the team world rankings as of May 2, 2023. Each nation's highest ranked athlete/pair's points in each of the five events will be added to determine a country's point total.

== Seeds ==
The following athletes were seeded:

1. Beiwen Zhang (USA) (champion, gold medalist)
2. Wen Yu Zhang (CAN) (third round)
3. Juliana Vieira (BRA) (third round)
4. Rachel Chan (CAN) (semi-finals, bronze medalist)
5. Inés Castillo (PER) (quarter-finals)
6. Haramara Gaitán (MEX) (quarter-finals)
7. Jennie Gai (USA) (final, silver medalist)
8. Nikté Sotomayor (EAI) (quarter-finals)

== Results ==
=== Finals ===
Semi-finals
1 | Beiwen Zhang (USA) | 21 | 21
4 | Rachel Chan (CAN) | 16 | 11
7 | Jennie Gai (USA) | 22 | 21
Taymara Oropesa (CUB) | 20 | 7

Final
1 | Beiwen Zhang (USA) | 21 | 21
7 | Jennie Gai (USA) | 8 | 12

=== Top half ===
==== Section 1 ====
First round

Second round
1 | Beiwen Zhang (USA) | 21 | 21
María Rojas (VEN) | 6 | 3
María Zambrano (ECU) | 18 | 19
Sâmia Lima (BRA) | 21 | 21
8 | Nikté Sotomayor (EAI) | 21 | 21
Alisa Acosta (DOM) | 9 | 8
Chequeda de Boulet (TRI) | 9 | 21 | 23
Daniela Hernández (ESA) | 21 | 10 | 21

Third round
1 | Beiwen Zhang (USA) | 21 | 21
Sâmia Lima (BRA) | 14 | 6
8 | Nikté Sotomayor (EAI) | 21 | 21
Chequeda de Boulet (TRI) | 9 | 18

Quarter-finals
1 | Beiwen Zhang (USA) | 21 | 21
8 | Nikté Sotomayor (EAI) | 8 | 6

==== Section 2 ====
First round
Gabriela Barrios (ESA) | 9 | 18
Ailén Oliva (ARG) | 21 | 21

Second round
4 | Rachel Chan (CAN) | 21 | 21
Yeily Ortiz (CUB) | 5 | 12
Katherine Wynter (JAM) | 21 | 21
Juanita Siviora (BOL) | 3 | 8
5 | Inés Castillo (PER) | 21 | 21
Laura Londoño (COL) | 8 | 8
Ashley Montre (CHI) | 21 | 21
Ailén Oliva (ARG) | 13 | 8

Third round
4 | Rachel Chan (CAN) | 21 | 21
Katherine Wynter (JAM) | 5 | 8
5 | Inés Castillo (PER) | 21 | 21
Ashley Montre (CHI) | 8 | 10

Quarter-finals
4 | Rachel Chan (CAN) | 21 | 21
5 | Inés Castillo (PER) | 17 | 10

=== Bottom half ===
==== Section 3 ====
First round
Neila Jean (HAI) | 3 | 0
Vania Diaz (CHI) | 21 | 21

Second round
Vania Diaz (CHI) | 13 | 11
Tahlia Richardson (JAM) | 21 | 21
Adriana Barrios (EAI) | 9 | 11
7 | Jennie Gai (USA) | 21 | 21
Eliana Zhang (CAN) | 21 | 21
Iona Gualdi (ARG) | 11 | 8
Priyanna Ramdhani (GUY) | 6 | 0^{r}
3 | Juliana Vieira (BRA) | 21 | 11

Third round
Tahlia Richardson (JAM) | 14 | 5
7 | Jennie Gai (USA) | 21 | 21
Eliana Zhang (CAN) | 21 | 22
3 | Juliana Vieira (BRA) | 13 | 20

Quarter-finals
7 | Jennie Gai (USA) | 21 | 21
Eliana Zhang (CAN) | 12 | 18

==== Section 4 ====
First round

Second round
Fernanda Saponara (PER) | 21 | 21
Mariana Palacios (EAI) | 10 | 9
Fátima Centeno (ESA) | 13 | 18
6 | Haramara Gaitán (MEX) | 21 | 21
Taymara Oropesa (CUB) | 21 | 21
Valeria Santos (CHI) | 4 | 5
Nairoby Jiménez (DOM) | 12 | 6
2 | Wen Yu Zhang (CAN) | 21 | 21

Third round
Fernanda Saponara (PER) | 9 | 20
6 | Haramara Gaitán (MEX) | 21 | 22
Taymara Oropesa (CUB) | 8 | 21 | 21
2 | Wen Yu Zhang (CAN) | 21 | 16 | 19

Quarter-finals
6 | Haramara Gaitán (MEX) | 14 | 21 | 22
Taymara Oropesa (CUB) | 21 | 18 | 24
