= Basque pelota at the 2019 Pan American Games – Men's individual hand fronton =

Basque pelota – Men's individual hand fronton at the 2019 Pan American Games
- Venue: Villa María del Triunfo Center
- Dates: 4–10 August
- Competitors: 6 from 6 nations

Medalists
Gold medal	David Alvarez	Mexico
Silver medal	Dariel Leiva Nelson	Cuba
Bronze medal	Filipe Otheguy	Brazil

The men's individual hand fronton basque pelota event at the 2019 Pan American Games was held from 4–10 August at the Basque pelota courts in the Villa María del Triunfo Sports Center in Lima, Peru. The David Alvarez won the gold medal, after defeating Dariel Leiva Nelson in the final.

== Results ==
=== Preliminary round ===
The preliminary stage consisted of 2 pools where every competitor played each other competitor in the same pool once. At the end of this stage, the first two teams from each pool played in the semifinals, and then the medal round.

==== Pool A ====
Pos	Team	Pld	W	L	PF	PA	PD	Pts
1	Mexico David Alvarez	2	2	0	40	4	+36	6
2	Brazil Filipe Otheguy	2	1	1	26	36	−10	4
3	Uruguay Richard Airala	2	0	2	18	44	−26	2

Updated to match(es) played on 18 September 2019. Source: Lima 2019

All times are local (UTC-5)

4 August; 10:01	David Alvarez (Mexico)	2–0	(Brazil) Filipe Otheguy	Villa María del Triunfo Sports Center; Referees: Rolando Antonio Casteleiro (CUB)
4 August; 10:01	(10–2, 10–0); Report			Villa María del Triunfo Sports Center; Referees: Rolando Antonio Casteleiro (CUB)

5 August; 10:01	David Alvarez (Mexico)	2–0	(Uruguay) Richard Airala	Villa María del Triunfo Sports Center; Referees: Roberto Andrés Jara (CHI)
5 August; 10:01	(10–2, 10–0); Report			Villa María del Triunfo Sports Center; Referees: Roberto Andrés Jara (CHI)

6 August; 10:00	Filipe Otheguy (Brazil)	2–1	(Uruguay) Richard Airala	Villa María del Triunfo Sports Center; Referees: Rolando Antonio Casteleiro (CUB)
6 August; 10:00	(10–4, 9–10, 5-2); Report			Villa María del Triunfo Sports Center; Referees: Rolando Antonio Casteleiro (CUB)

==== Pool B ====
Pos	Team	Pld	W	L	PF	PA	PD	Pts
1	Cuba Dariel Leiva Nelson	2	2	0	40	8	+32	6
2	Bolivia Josias Bazo	2	1	1	25	29	−4	4
3	Peru Jesús Quinto	2	0	2	12	40	−28	2

Updated to match(es) played on 18 September 2019. Source: Lima 2019

All times are local (UTC-5)

4 August; 10:38	Josias Bazo (Bolivia)	0-2	(Cuba) Dariel Leiva Nelson	Villa María del Triunfo Sports Center; Referees: Dardo Heber Ferreira (URU)
4 August; 10:38	(4-10, 1–10); Report			Villa María del Triunfo Sports Center; Referees: Dardo Heber Ferreira (URU)

5 August; 10:26	Josias Bazo (Bolivia)	2-0	(Peru) Jesús Quinto	Villa María del Triunfo Sports Center; Referees: Dardo Heber Ferreira (URU)
5 August; 10:26	(10-3, 10-6); Report			Villa María del Triunfo Sports Center; Referees: Dardo Heber Ferreira (URU)

6 August; 11:05	Dariel Leiva Nelson (Cuba)	2-0	(Peru) Jesús Quinto	Villa María del Triunfo Sports Center; Referees: Pedro López (MEX)
6 August; 11:05	(10-2, 10-1); Report			Villa María del Triunfo Sports Center; Referees: Pedro López (MEX)

=== Semifinals ===
7 August; 10:00	David Alvarez (Mexico)	2-0	(Bolivia) Josias Bazo	Villa María del Triunfo Sports Center; Referees: Alejandro Varela (URU)
7 August; 10:00	(10-0, 10-2); Report			Villa María del Triunfo Sports Center; Referees: Alejandro Varela (URU)

7 August; 10:35	Dariel Leiva Nelson (Cuba)	2-0	(Brazil) Filipe Otheguy	Villa María del Triunfo Sports Center; Referees: Pedro López (MEX)
7 August; 10:35	(10-4, 10-0); Report			Villa María del Triunfo Sports Center; Referees: Pedro López (MEX)

=== Bronze medal match ===
9 August; 10:01	Josias Bazo (Bolivia)	0-2	(Brazil) Filipe Otheguy	Villa María del Triunfo Sports Center; Referees: Alejandro Varela (URU)
9 August; 10:01	(6-10, 3-10); Report			Villa María del Triunfo Sports Center; Referees: Alejandro Varela (URU)

=== Gold medal match ===
10 August; 16:15	David Alvarez (Mexico)	2-0	(Cuba) Dariel Leiva Nelson	Villa María del Triunfo Sports Center; Referees: Alejandro Varela (URU)
10 August; 16:15	(10-0, 10-0); Report			Villa María del Triunfo Sports Center; Referees: Alejandro Varela (URU)
