= Racquetball at the 2015 Pan American Games – Women's team =

Racquetball – Women's team at the 2015 Pan American Games
- Venue: Exhibition Centre – Hall C
- Dates: July 24 - July 26
- Competitors: 21 from 10 nations

Medalists
Gold medal	Paola Longoria; Samantha Salas	Mexico
Silver medal	Michelle Key; Rhonda Rajsich; Kim Russell	United States
Bronze medal	María Muñoz; Maria Sotomayor	Ecuador
Bronze medal	Frédérique Lambert; Jennifer Saunders	Canada

The women's team competition of the racquetball events at the 2015 Pan American Games was held from July 24–26 at the Direct Energy Centre (Exhibition Centre), in Toronto, Canada. Mexico is the defending Pan American Games Women's Team champion.

== Schedule ==
All times are Central Standard Time (UTC-6).

Date	Time	Round
July 24, 2015	17:05	First Round
July 25, 2015	9:50	Quarterfinals
July 25, 2015	17:05	Semifinals
July 26, 2015	9:05	Final

== Results ==
=== Playoffs ===
First Round
Chile	2	2
Venezuela	0	0
Canada	1	2	2
Guatemala	2	1	1

Quarterfinals
Mexico	2	2
Chile	0	0
Bolivia	0	0
Ecuador	2	2
United States	2	2
Colombia	0	0
Canada	2	2
Argentina	0	0

Semifinals
Mexico	2	0	2
Ecuador	0	2	0
United States	2	2
Canada	0	0

Final
Mexico	2	2
United States	0	0

== Final standings ==
Rank	Nation	Athlete
1st place, gold medalist(s)	Mexico	Paola Longoria; Samantha Salas
2nd place, silver medalist(s)	United States	Michelle Key; Rhonda Rajsich; Kim Russell
3rd place, bronze medalist(s)	Ecuador	María Muñoz; Maria Sotomayor
3rd place, bronze medalist(s)	Canada	Frédérique Lambert; Jennifer Saunders
5	Chile	Angela Grisar; Carla Muñoz
5	Bolivia	Carola Loma; Adriana Riveros
5	Colombia	Cristina Amaya; María Gómez
5	Argentina	Veronique Guillemette; Maria Jose Vargas
9	Venezuela	Mariana Paredes; Mariana Tobon
9	Guatemala	Gabriela Martinez; Maria Rodriguez
