= Wrestling at the 2023 Pan American Games – Men's freestyle 65 kg =

Men's Freestyle 65 kg at the 2023 Pan American Games
- Venue: Olympic Training Center in Ñuñoa
- Dates: November 2
- Competitors: 9 from 9 nations

Medalists
Gold medal	Alejandro Valdés	Cuba
Silver medal	Nahshon Garrett	United States
Bronze medal	Agustín Destribats	Argentina
Bronze medal	Joey Silva	Puerto Rico

The men's freestyle 65 kg competition of the Wrestling events at the 2023 Pan American Games in Ñuñoa was held on November 2.

== Qualification ==
The winner of each weight category at the 2021 Junior Pan American Games in Cali, Colombia qualified directly, along with the top four at the 2022 Pan American Wrestling Championships and 2023 Pan American Wrestling Championships. The host country (Chile) is guaranteed a spot in each event, but its athletes must compete in both the 2022 and 2023 Pan American Championship. If Chile does not qualify at any of the first two events, it will take the fourth spot available at the 2023 Pan American Championships. A further six wildcards (four men and two women) will be awarded to nations without any qualified athlete but took part in the qualification tournaments.

== Schedule ==
All times are local (UTC−3)

Date	Time	Event
Wednesday, 2 November 2023	10:00	Round of 16
Wednesday, 2 November 2023	10:00	Quarterfinals
Wednesday, 2 November 2023	11:00	Semifinals
Wednesday, 2 November 2023	13:00	Repechage
Wednesday, 2 November 2023	17:00	Finals

== Results ==
Legend

- F — Won by fall

=== Main Bracket ===
Round of 16
Nahshon Garrett (USA)	12
Sixto Auccapiña (PER)	4

Quarterfinals
André Quispe (CHI)	0
Nahshon Garrett (USA)	10
Agustín Destribats (ARG)	11
Marvin Chávez (BOL)	0
Joey Silva (PUR)	0
Alejandro Valdés (CUB)	10
Álbaro Rudesindo (DOM)	6
Úber Cuero (COL)	3

Semifinals
Nahshon Garrett (USA)	7
Agustín Destribats (ARG)	5
Alejandro Valdés (CUB)	10
Álbaro Rudesindo (DOM)	0

Finals
Nahshon Garrett (USA)	0
Alejandro Valdés (CUB)	9^{F}

=== Repechage ===
Repechage round 1
Sixto Auccapiña (PER)	11
André Quispe (CHI)	0

Bronze medal match
Sixto Auccapiña (PER)	1
Agustín Destribats (ARG)	7
Joey Silva (PUR)	6
Álbaro Rudesindo (DOM)	5

== Final standing ==
Rank	Athlete
1st place, gold medalist(s)	Alejandro Valdés (CUB)
2nd place, silver medalist(s)	Nahshon Garrett (USA)
3rd place, bronze medalist(s)	Agustín Destribats (ARG)
3rd place, bronze medalist(s)	Joey Silva (PUR)
5	Sixto Auccapiña (PER)
5	Álbaro Rudesindo (DOM)
7	Úber Cuero (COL)
8	Marvin Chávez (BOL)
9	André Quispe (CHI)
