= Filipe Otheguy =

Brazilian bowler (born 1987)

Personal information
- Born: 18 June 1991 (age 35) Biarritz, France
- Height: 1.86 m (6 ft 1 in)

Sport
- Country: Brazil
- Sport: Basque pelota
Medal record
Men's basque pelota
Representing Brazil
Pan American Games
Bronze medal – third place	2019 Lima	Hand fronton singles
Bronze medal – third place	2023 Santiago	Frontball singles
South American Games
Silver medal – second place	2026 Santa Fe	Fronton

Filipe Otheguy (born 18 June 1991) is a French-born Brazilian basque pelota player. Son of a Frenchman and a Brazilian, he competed representing the Brazilian flag at the 2019 and 2023 Pan American Games.

Before competing in the Pan, he participated in editions of World Championships and a World Cup in the sport. His specialty is manual frontón, a competition in which the competitor hits the ball with their hands without using any equipment. To defend Brazil in Basque pelota competitions, he had to apply for a Brazilian passport, a requirement of the Brazilian Olympic Committee.

At the 2019 Pan American Games held in Lima, Peru, he won a bronze medal in basque pelota in Individual hand fronton.

At the 2023 Pan American Games held in Santiago, Chile, he won a bronze medal in basque pelota in Individual frontball.
