= Erika Manilla =

American racquetball player

Personal information
- Nationality: American
- Born: February 1, 1998 (age 28) Colorado

Sport
- Sport: Racquetball
Medal record
Women's Racquetball
Representing United States
Pan American Games
Gold medal – first place	2023 Santiago	Mixed Doubles
Bronze medal – third place	2023 Santiago	Team
World Championships
Bronze medal – third place	2022 San Luis Potosi	Team
Silver medal – second place	2022 Guatemala	Doubles
Pan American Championships
Bronze medal – third place	2022 Santa Cruz	Doubles
Bronze medal – third place	2022 Santa Cruz	Mixed Doubles

Erika Manilla (born February 1, 1998) is an American racquetball player. Manilla is the current Pan American Games Champion in Mixed Doubles, winning gold with her brother Adam at the 2023 Pan American Games in Santiago, Chile. She also won doubles at the 2022 US Open Racquetball Championships with Natalia Mendez, and has won six USA Racquetball (USAR) National titles (2 singles, 3 doubles, 1 mixed doubles).

== Early life and education ==
Manilla grew up in Centennial, Colorado. Manilla holds a B.S. in biomedical sciences from the Northern Arizona University.

== Career ==
=== 2015–2019: Success at World Juniors and Intercollegiates ===
Manilla reached the Girls U14 Singles semi-finals at the 2012 World Juniors in Los Angeles, where she lost to Natalia Mendez of Bolivia, 15–5, 15–4. She played Girls U14 Doubles that year with Jordan Cooperrider, and they finished 3rd in a six team round robin competition.

In Sucre, Bolivia, in 2013, Manilla lost in the quarterfinals of Girls U14 Singles to team-mate Jordan Cooperrider, 15–12, 15–9. Manilla and Cooperrider played doubles together and finished 2nd to Mexicans Montserrat Mejia and Andrea Ramirez in a seven team round robin competition.

At the 2014 World Junior Championships in Cali, Colombia, Manilla lost in the quarterfinals of Girls U16 Singles to Costa Rican Melania Sauma, 15–5, 15–7. She again teamed up with Cooperrider for Girls U16 Doubles, and they lost to Sauma and Sofia Soley in the semi-finals, 15–6, 15–13.

Manilla played at the 2015 World Junior Championships in Santo Domingo, Dominican Republic, where she lost in the quarterfinals of Girls U16 Singles to Gabriela Martinez, 15–11, 15–9. Manilla and Jordan Cooperrider won Girls U16 Doubles, going undefeated in a five team round robin competition.

Manilla won Girls U18 Singles at the 2016 World Junior Championships in San Luis Potosi, Mexico, where she beat Melania Sauma of Costa Rica, 15–3, 15–13, in the final after defeating team-mate Jordan Cooperrider in the semi-finals, 15–9, 13–15, 11–7. She and Cooperrider were 2nd in doubles to Guatemalan sisters Andrea and Gabriela Martinez.

The 2016 USAR National Singles Championships were in Highlands Ranch, Colorado, close to Manilla's home, so she played in them, losing in the quarterfinals to Cheryl Gudinas, 15–12, 8–15, 11–4.

Manilla went to college at Northern Arizona University, and represented them in the 2017 USAR Intercollegiate Championships in Fountain Valley, California, where she and Erin Boadway defeated Carla Muñoz and Samantha Baker of Colorado State at Pueblo to win Women's Doubles, 15–10, 15–12. In singles, Manilla lost in the semi-finals to Melania Sauma of Arizona State University, 3–15, 15–5, 11–9.

Manilla teamed up with Jackie Paraiso for the 2018 USAR National Doubles Championships in Tempe, Arizona. They lost in the semi-finals to Kelani Bailey and Sharon Jackson, 15–2, 15–14.

At the 2018 USAR Intercollegiate Championships, Manilla lost in the final to Carla Muñoz (Colorado State at Pueblo), 15–9, 15–8, after beating Lexi York (Oregon State) in the semi-finals, 15–7, 14–15, 11–8, but she and Erin Boadway successfully defended their doubles title by defeating York and Natalie Lorati in final, 14–15, 15–10, 11–8.

Manilla played in the 2018 USAR National Singles Championships in Pleasanton, California, where she lost to Sheryl Lotts in the quarterfinals, 15–7, 15–8.

In 2019, Manilla teamed up with Hollie Scott for the USAR National Doubles Championships in Tempe, Arizona, where they lost to Danielle Maddux and Michelle De La Rosa, 15–9, 15–10, in the quarterfinals.

Manilla represented Northern Arizona at the 2019 USAR Intercollegiate Championships in Tempe, Arizona, where she finished 3rd in singles, after losing to Hollie Scott (Washington) in the semi-finals, 15–9, 15–4, and then defeating Melania Sauma (Arizona State), 15–5, 4–15, 11–4, in the 3rd place match. In doubles, Manilla played with Lindsay Briglia, and they lost in the semi-finals to Brenda Laime and Adriana Riveros (Colorado State at Pueblo), 15–13, 15–2, and lost the 3rd place match to Elyse Duffie and Elena Robles (Purdue), 15–6, 2–15, 11–4.

Manilla was in the draw for the 2019 USAR National Singles Championships in Highlands Ranch, Colorado, but she forfeited her first match against Cheryl Gudinas in the quarterfinals.

Manilla played one or two Ladies Professional Racquetball Tour events a season from 2014 to 2020, and never made it past the Round of 32.

=== 2020 to present: Playing full time on the LPRT and for Team USA ===
At the 2020 USA Racquetball National Doubles Championships in Tempe, Arizona, Manilla won Women's Doubles with Aimee Ruiz, as they defeated Hollie Scott and Lexi York in the final, 15–6, 15–9. There was also a US Team qualifying singles event in Tempe, and Manilla defeated Rhonda Rajsich, 15–3, 12–15, 11–7, in the semi-finals, but lost in the final to Scott, 15–5, 9–15, 11–9. The doubles win should have put Manilla on Team USA for the 2020 World Championships, but then the COVID-19 pandemic happened, and international racquetball events were cancelled or suspended.

At the 2021 USA Racquetball National Team qualifying event in Des Moines, Iowa, Manilla lost in the semi-finals of Women's Singles to Kelani Lawrence, 15–13, 15–6, and then won the 3rd place match against Hollie Scott, 15–14, 15–11. She won Women's Doubles with Rhonda Rajsich, as they beat Michelle De La Rosa and Sheryl Lotts, in the final, 15–8, 15–14.

Manilla began to play the LPRT full time in 2021, but in three events still hadn't made it past the Round of 32. Thus, it was a surprise when she reached the semi-finals of the 2021 US Open. Manilla defeated Montserrat Mejia, 15–9, 13–15, 11–3, in the Round of 32, Micaela Meneses, 14–15, 15–12, 11–6, in the Round of 16, Gabriela Martinez, 6–15, 15–5, 11–4, in the quarterfinals, before losing to Paola Longoria in the semi-finals, 15–13, 15–10.

Her doubles win at national team qualifying put Manilla on Team USA for the 2021 Racquetball World Championships in Guatemala, where she played Women's Doubles with Rhonda Rajsich. They reached the final by defeating Argentina's Valeria Centellas and Natalia Mendez, 6–15, 15–9, 11–8, in the semi-finals, but lost to Mexicans Paola Longoria and Samantha Salas, 15–14, 15–6, in the final.

She made her second pro semi-final in the 2021–22 LPRT season at the 2022 Vero Beach Open, where Manilla lost to Paola Longoria, 15–11, 15–6. These results helped Manilla finish No. 6 at season's end.

Manilla played at the 2022 Pan American Racquetball Championships in Santa Cruz de la Sierra, Bolivia. She and Rhonda Rajsich reached the semi-finals by beating Colombians Cristina Amaya and Maria Paz Riquelme, 15–9, 15–5, 15–11, but lost in the semis to Argentina's Natalia Mendez and Maria Jose Vargas, 15–11, 12–15, 15–14, 15–14. Manilla played Mixed Doubles with Alejandro Landa, losing in the semi-finals to Mexicans Rodrigo Montoya and Samantha Salas, as Landa was assessed three technical faults, resulting a match forfeit.

Manilla won the 2022 USA Racquetball National Women's Singles title by defeating Rhonda Rajsich in the final, 11–7, 11–8, 11–1. She played doubles with Aimee Roehler, and they lost in the final to Kelani Lawrence and Hollie Scott, 11–6, 11–4, 8–11, 11–8, in the final, after beating Sheryl Lotts and Rhonda Rajsich in the semi-finals, 11–8, 11–7, 13–11. Manilla played Mixed Doubles with her brother Adam Manilla, and they lost to Michelle De La Rosa and Alejandro Landa in the final, 5–11, 11–4, 11–9, 12–10.

At the 2022 Racquetball World Championships in San Luis Potosi, Mexico, Manilla played Women's Singles, losing to Bolivian Angélica Barrios in the quarterfinals, 11–6, 11–9, 5–11, 11–7. In the Women's Team event, the USA beat Guatemala in the quarterfinals, but then lost to Mexico in the semi-finals, so Manilla left Mexico with a bronze medal.

Manilla played at the 2023 Pan American Racquetball Championships in Guatemala City, Guatemala. She defeated Canadian Michèle Morissette, 11–7, 11–7, 11–5, in the Round of 32, but lost to Mexican Montserrat Mejia, 11–9, 16–14, 8–11, 15–13, in the Round of 16. She and Michelle Key played Women's Doubles, and they lost in the quarterfinals to Bolivians Angélica Barrios and Jenny Daza, 11–5, 11–5, 11–7. The 2023 Pan Am Championships were the qualifying event for the 2023 Pan American Games in Santiago, Chile, and Manilla's performances helped the USA qualify for Santiago.

Manilla won the 2023 USA Racquetball National Women's Singles title by defeating Kelani Lawrence in the final, 11–3, 8–11, 11–7, 11–6. She also won both the USA National Women's Doubles and Mixed Doubles championships in 2023. In Women's Doubles, she and Michelle Key defeated Lawrence and Hollie Scott, 7–11, 11–4, 11–6, 11–7, in the final, after beating Sheryl Lotts and Rhonda Rajsich in the semi-finals, 11–8, 11–5, 11–6. Manilla played Mixed Doubles with her brother Adam Manilla, and they defeated Daniel De La Rosa and Hollie Scott in the final, 11–6, 11–8, 10–12, 11–9.

Manilla won gold in Mixed Doubles at the 2023 Pan American Games in Santiago, Chile. She and brother Adam Manilla beat Argentina's Diego Garcia and Maria Jose Vargas, 11–4, 11–4, 11–6, in the final, after defeating Mexicans Paola Longoria and Eduardo Portillo, 11–9, 13–11, 6–11, 8–11, 11–7, in the semi-finals. In Women's Singles in Santiago, Manilla lost to Mexican Paola Longoria, 11–3, 11–5, 11–9, in the quarterfinals, and in Women's Doubles she and Michelle Key lost to Argentina's Natalia Mendez and Vargas, 10–12, 11–9, 11–5, 12–10, in the quarterfinals. But Manilla and Key did get bronze in the Women's Team event, as they defeated Bolivia, 2–0, in the quarterfinals, but lost to Mexico, 2–0, in the semi-finals.

Manilla was runner up in both Women's Singles and Doubles at the 2024 USA Racquetball National Indoor Championships in Tempe, Arizona. She lost in the singles final to Hollie Scott, due to an injury, after losing the first game, 11–5. In doubles, Manilla and Michelle Key lost to Scott and Kelani Lawrence, 7–11, 12–10, 11–9, 15–13. Also, Manilla and brother Adam Manilla were the defending champions in Mixed Doubles, but they lost in the semi-finals to Thomas Carter and Lawrence, 11–6, 11–6, 9–11, 11–4.

== Career summary ==
Manilla has represented the USA internationally several times, and her highlight is a gold medal in Mixed Doubles with her brother Adam at the 2023 Pan American Games in Santiago, Chile. She's played the LPRT full time since 2021, with her highlight victory being the 2022 US Open LPRT Doubles title with Natalia Mendez. Manilla has won eight USA Racquetball National titles: 2 singles, 4 doubles, 2 mixed doubles.

=== Career record ===
This table lists Manilla's results across annual events.

Year	2014	2015	2016	2017	2018	2019	2020	2021	2022	2023	2024	2025
USAR Nationals – Singles			QF	–	QF	QF	P	SF	W	W	F	SF
USAR Nationals – Doubles					SF	QF	W	W	F	W	F	W
USAR Nationals – Mixed Doubles									F	W	SF	W
US Open		32	32	32	32	–	P	SF	F	–		
US Open Doubles		QF	QF	32	32	–	P	QF	W	–		
LPRT Ranking	55	50	40	52	46	54	–	37	6	4		

Note: W = winner, F = finalist, SF = semi-finalist, QF = quarterfinalist, 16 = Round of 16. P = pandemic cancelled event.

See also

- List of racquetball players
