= Bolivia at the 2023 Pan American Games =

- IOC code: BOL
- NOC: Bolivian Olympic Committee

in Santiago, Chile 20 October 2023 – 5 November 2023
- Competitors: 69 in 19 sports
- Flag bearers (opening): Conrrado Moscoso & Noelia Zeballos
- Flag bearers (closing): Juan Terceros & Mayra Mancilla
- Medals Ranked 17th: Gold 2 Silver 1 Bronze 2 Total 5

Pan American Games appearances (overview)
- 1967; 1971; 1975; 1979; 1983; 1987; 1991; 1995; 1999; 2003; 2007; 2011; 2015; 2019; 2023

Bolivia competed at the 2023 Pan American Games in Santiago, Chile from October 20 to November 5, 2023. It was Bolivia's 19th appearance at the Pan American Games, having competed at every edition of the Games.

On 8 October 2023, the Bolivian Olympic Committee officially named the team of 52 athletes competing in 18 sports. On 10 October 2023, tennis player Juan Carlos Prado gave up his position in the Games in order to prioritize the ITF World Tennis Tour Juniors. The following day, the female football team was invited to participate after Venezuela's withdrawal, increasing the nation's total to 69 athletes in 19 sports.

Racquetball athlete Conrrado Moscoso and tennis player Noelia Zeballos were the country's flagbearers during the opening ceremony. Meanwhile, golfer Marcos Moneta and race walker Mayra Mancilla were the country's flagbearers during the closing ceremony.

== Competitors ==
The following is the list of number of competitors (per gender) participating at the games per sport/discipline.

Sport	Men	Women	Total
Athletics	1	6	7
Badminton	0	1	1
Basque pelota	1	1	2
Cycling	2	2	4
Equestrian	2	0	2
Football	0	16	16
Golf	2	2	4
Gymnastics	1	2	3
Karate	0	1	1
Modern pentathlon	1	3	4
Racquetball	3	3	6
Shooting	2	2	4
Swimming	1	1	2
Taekwondo	0	2	2
Tennis	1	1	2
Triathlon	1	0	1
Volleyball	2	0	2
Weightlifting	1	2	3
Wrestling	1	0	1
Total	22	45	67

== Medallists ==
The following Bolivian competitors won medals at the games. In the discipline sections below, the medalists' names are bolded.

Medal	Name	Sport	Event	Date
Gold	Conrrado Moscoso	Racquetball	Men's singles	October 24
Gold	Kadim Carrasco; Carlos Keller; Conrrado Moscoso	Racquetball	Men's team	October 26
Silver	Carlos Keller	Racquetball	Men's singles	October 24
Bronze	Angélica Barrios; Jenny Daza	Racquetball	Women's doubles	October 24
Bronze	Angélica Barrios; Conrrado Moscoso	Racquetball	Mixed doubles	October 24

Medals by sport/discipline
Sport	1st place, gold medalist(s)	2nd place, silver medalist(s)	3rd place, bronze medalist(s)	Total
Racquetball	2	1	2	**5**
Total	2	1	2	5

Medals by day
**Day**	1st place, gold medalist(s)	2nd place, silver medalist(s)	3rd place, bronze medalist(s)	**Total**
24 October	1	1	2	4
26 October	1	0	0	1
Total	2	1	2	5

Medals by gender
**Day**	1st place, gold medalist(s)	2nd place, silver medalist(s)	3rd place, bronze medalist(s)	**Total**
Women	0	0	1	1
Men	2	1	0	3
Mixed/Open	0	0	1	1
Total	2	1	2	5

== Athletics ==
Bolivia qualified seven female athletes for the games.

Men
Track & road events

Athlete	Event	Semifinal		Final	
Athlete	Event	Time	Rank	Time	Rank
Nery Cornejo	400 m	50.97	10	Did not advance	

Women
Track & road events

Athlete	Event	Semifinal		Final	
Athlete	Event	Time	Rank	Time	Rank
Guadalupe Torrez	100 m	12.17	21	Did not advance	
Mayra Quispe	20 km walk	—N/a		No result^{N}	8
Valeria Quispe Fuentes; Leticia Soria; Guadalupe Tórrez; Lauren Mendoza; Alinny Delgadillo	4 × 100 m relay	45.85	9	Did not advance	

^{N} - The results for the women's 20 km race walk were declared void after the race distance was remeasured and found to be 3 km short.

Field events

Athlete	Event	Result	Rank
Valeria Quispe Fuentes	Triple jump	12.40	8

== Badminton ==
Bolivia qualified one female athlete.

Women

Athlete	Event	First round	Second round	Third round	Quarterfinals	Semifinals	Final	Rank
Athlete	Event	Opposition Result	Opposition Result	Opposition Result	Opposition Result	Opposition Result	Opposition Result	Rank
Juanita Siviora	Singles	Bye	Wynter (JAM); L 3–21, 8–21	Did not advance				

== Basque pelota ==
Bolivia qualified two pelotari (one man and one woman) through the 2023 Pan American Basque Pelota Tournament.

Athlete	Event	Preliminary round					Semifinal	Final / BM	Rank
Athlete	Event	Match 1	Match 2	Match 3	Match 4	Rank	Semifinal	Final / BM	Rank
Athlete	Event	Opposition Score	Opposition Score	Opposition Score	Opposition Score	Rank	Opposition Score	Opposition Score	Rank
Carlos Javier Pérez	Men's individual fronton	Bolelli (CHI); L 0–15, 0–15	Pérez (MEX); L 0–15, 0–15	González (CUB); L 0–15, 0–15	Fernández (ARG); L 0–15, 0–15	5	Did not advance		
Julia Pérez	Women's frontball	Leoncio (CUB); L 12–11, 7–12, 6–7	Blas (EAI); W 12–3, 12–10	Acosta (URU); L 5–12, 7–12	—N/a	3	Did not advance		

== Cycling ==
Bolivia qualified a total of 4 cyclists (2 men and 2 women).

=== BMX ===
Bolivia qualified four cyclists in BMX race through the UCI World Ranking of Nations.

Racing

Athlete	Event	Ranking round		Quarterfinal		Semifinal		Final	
Athlete	Event	Time	Rank	Points	Rank	Time	Rank	Time	Rank
Nicolás Arze Gómez	Men	37.110	19	14	5	Did not advance			
Sebastián Arze Gómez	Men	37.340	20	15	5	Did not advance			
María Peinado Pizarro	Women	42.310	15	15	5	Did not advance			
María Enriquez Anaya	Women	43.870	16	18	6	Did not advance			

== Equestrian ==
Bolivia qualified two equestrians in Jumping.

=== Jumping ===
Athlete	Horse	Event	Qualification								Final					
Athlete	Horse	Event	Round 1		Round 2		Round 3		Total		Round A		Round B		Total	
Athlete	Horse	Event	Faults	Rank	Faults	Rank	Faults	Rank	Faults	Rank	Faults	Rank	Faults	Rank	Faults	Rank
Diego Bedoya	Skara Glen's Para Bellum	Individual	55.31	42	Did not advance											
Reynaldo Cardozo	Doria One Loar Mystic Rose	Individual	17.96	41	25	28	25	37	67.96	37	Did not advance					

== Football ==
=== Women's tournament ===
Summary

Key:

- A.E.T – After extra time.
- P – Match decided by penalty-shootout.

Team	Event	Group Stage				Semifinal	Final / BM	
Team	Event	Opposition Score	Opposition Score	Opposition Score	Rank	Opposition Score	Opposition Score	Rank
Bolivia women	Women's tournament	United States; L 0–6	Argentina; L 0–3	Costa Rica; D 0–0	4	—N/a	Jamaica; W 2–1	7

Bolivia qualified a women's team of 18 athletes after reallocation following Venezuela's withdrawal. Group stage

Pos	Team	Pld	W	D	L	GF	GA	GD	Pts	Qualification
1	United States	3	3	0	0	13	1	+12	9	Semi-finals
2	Argentina	3	1	1	1	3	4	−1	4	Semi-finals
3	Costa Rica	3	0	2	1	1	3	−2	2	Fifth place match
4	Bolivia	3	0	1	2	0	9	−9	1	Seventh place match

Source: Santiago2023
22 October 2023
15:00

United States	6–0	Bolivia
McDonald 4', 22', 68'; Villarreal 19', 58'; Adames 33'	Report

Estadio Sausalito, Viña del Mar
Referee: Stefani Escobar (Venezuela)

25 October 2023
18:00

Bolivia	0–3	Argentina
	Report	Cometti 11'; Stábile 48' (pen.); Cruz 90+5'

Estadio Elías Figueroa Brander, Valparaíso
Referee: Gabriela Arce (Paraguay)

28 October 2023
18:00

Costa Rica	0–0	Bolivia
	Report

Estadio Sausalito, Viña del Mar
Referee: Stefani Escobar (Venezuela)

Seventh place match

31 October 2023
12:00

Jamaica	1–2	Bolivia
Bonnick 48'	Report	Alurralde 24'; Méndez 67'

Estadio Elías Figueroa Brander, Valparaíso
Referee: Gabriela Arce (Paraguay)

== Golf ==
Bolivia qualified a team of four golfers (two men and two women).

Athlete	Event	Round 1	Round 2	Round 3	Round 4	Total		
Athlete	Event	Score	Score	Score	Score	Score	Par	Rank
Juan Cristian Terceros	Men's individual	69	73	72	74	288	E	21
Flavio Semeja	Men's individual	80	72	70	71	293	+5	25
Sofia Blanco	Women's individual	75	79	74	81	309	+21	22
María José Savoca	Women's individual	83	81	78	80	322	+34	31

== Gymnastics ==
=== Artistic ===
Bolivia qualified two gymnasts in artistic (one man and one woman) at the 2023 Pan American Championships.

Men

Athlete	Event	Qualification						Total	Rank
Athlete	Event	F	PH	R	V	PB	HB	Total	Rank
Oliver Sánchez	Individual all-around	11.000	9.200	12.600	13.766	11.300	10.833	68.699	30

Qualification Legend: Q = Qualified to apparatus final

Women

Athlete	Event	Qualification				Total	Rank
Athlete	Event	V	UB	BB	F	Total	Rank
Diana Seoane	Individual all-around	Did not start					

Qualification Legend: Q = Qualified to apparatus final

=== Trampoline ===
Bolivia qualified one female gymnast in trampoline at the 2023 Pan American Championships.

Athlete	Event	Qualification		Final	
Athlete	Event	Score	Rank	Score	Rank
Maya Zaballa	Women's	40.820	11	Did not advance	

== Karate ==
Bolivia qualified 1 female karateka at the 2022 South American Games.

Kumite

Athlete	Event	Round robin					Semifinal	Final	
Athlete	Event	Opposition Result	Opposition Result	Opposition Result	Opposition Result	Rank	Opposition Result	Opposition Result	Rank
Nazira Gonzales	Women's –68 kg	Rodrigues (BRA); L 0–0	Bratic (CAN); L 0–0	Campos (MEX); L 0–0	Cuervo (VEN); L 0–0	3	Did not advance		9

== Modern pentathlon ==
Bolivia qualified four modern pentathletes (two men and two women).

Athlete	Event	Fencing ranking round (Épée one touch)			Semifinal									Final												
Athlete	Event	Fencing ranking round (Épée one touch)			Fencing	Swimming (200 m freestyle)			Shooting / Running (10 m laser pistol / 3000 m cross-country)			Total		Fencing	Swimming			Riding (Show jumping)				Shooting / Running			Total	
Athlete	Event	V – D	Rank	MP points	BP	Time	Rank	MP points	Time	Rank	MP points	MP points	Rank	BP	Time	Rank	MP points	Time	Faults	Rank	MP points	Time	Rank	MP points	MP points	Rank
Francesco Chumacero	Men's individual	8–22	27	172	2	2:23.51	15	263	11:55	15	585	1022	30	Did not advance												
Jeiny Cerda	Women's individual	5–27	51	192	0	2:40.63	23	229	15:46	31	354	731	31	Did not advance												
Fátima Casas	Women's individual	18–14	13	148	0	2:32.94	15	247	14:19	27	441	819	30	Did not advance												

== Racquetball ==
Bolivia qualified six racquetball athletes (three men and three women).

Men

Athlete	Event	Round of 32	Round of 16	Quarterfinal	Semifinal	Final	
Athlete	Event	Opposition Result	Opposition Result	Opposition Result	Opposition Result	Opposition Result	Rank
Conrrado Moscoso	Singles	Bye	Moyet (CUB); W 3–0 (11–4, 11–0, 11–6)	Acuña (CRC); W 3–0 (11–1, 11–6, 15–13)	Portillo (MEX); W 3–0 (11–3, 14–12, 12–10)	Carlos Keller (BOL); W 3–0 (11–3, 14–12, 12–10)	1st place, gold medalist(s)
Carlos Keller	Singles	Bye	Galicia (EAI); W 3–0 (11–9, 11–5, 11–8)	Murray (CAN); W 1–3 (11–9, 11–13, 14–12, 11–6)	Montoya (MEX); W 3–2 (6–11, 11–6, 11–13, 11–9, 11–8)	Conrrado Moscoso (BOL); L 3–0 (11–3, 14–12, 12–10)	2nd place, silver medalist(s)
Kadim Carrasco; Conrrado Moscoso	Doubles	—N/a	Bye	Galicia / Salvatierra (EAI); L 1–3 (10–12, 11–8, 6–11, 5–11)	Did not advance		
Kadim Carrasco; Carlos Keller; Conrrado Moscoso	Team	—N/a	Bye	Argentina; W 2–0 (3–1, 3–0)	United States; W 2–1 (3–0, 2–3, 3–2)	Canada; W 2–0 (3–2, 3–0)	1st place, gold medalist(s)

Women

Athlete	Event	Round of 32	Round of 16	Quarterfinal	Semifinal	Final	
Athlete	Event	Opposition Result	Opposition Result	Opposition Result	Opposition Result	Opposition Result	Rank
Angélica Barrios	Singles	Bye	Key (USA); W 3–0 (11–7, 11–3, 11–6)	Mejia (MEX); L 1–3 (8–11, 11–8, 2–11, 13–11)	Did not advance		
Yasmine Sabja Aliss	Singles	Bye	Manilla (USA); L 1–3 (11–8, 9–11, 4–11, 6–11)	Did not advance			
Angélica Barrios; Jenny Daza	Doubles	—N/a	Bye	M. J. Muñoz / Sotomayor (ECU); W 3–2 (12–10, 6–11, 11–5, 8–11, 11–7)	Martinez / Rodriguez (ECU); L 1–3 (13–11, 9–11, 10–12, 10–12)	Did not advance	3rd place, bronze medalist(s)
Angélica Barrios; Jenny Daza; Yasmine Sabja Aliss	Team	—N/a	Bye	United States; L 0–3 (2–3, 0–3)	Did not advance		

Mixed

Athlete	Event	Round of 16	Quarterfinal	Semifinal	Final	
Athlete	Event	Opposition Result	Opposition Result	Opposition Result	Opposition Result	Rank
Angélica Barrios / Conrrado Moscoso	Doubles	Bye	Murray; Lambert (CAN); W 3–1 (11–5, 11–9, 8–11, 11–4)	D. Garcia; Vargas (ARG); L 2–3 (11–9, 8–11, 8–11, 12–10, 9–11)	Did not advance	3rd place, bronze medalist(s)

== Shooting ==
Bolivia qualified a total of four shooters.

Men

Athlete	Event	Qualification		Final	
Athlete	Event	Points	Rank	Points	Rank
Rudolf Knijnenburg	10 m air pistol	563	16	Did not advance	
César Menacho	Trap	97	25	Did not advance	

Women

Athlete	Event	Qualification		Final	
Athlete	Event	Points	Rank	Points	Rank
Selenia Ledezma	10 m air rifle	609.7	20	Did not advance	
Madeleine Velasco	Trap	78	17	Did not advance	

== Swimming ==
Bolivia qualified two swimmers through the Universality criteria.

Key

- Note – Ranks given are for the entire round
- NR – National record
- QA – Qualified for Final A
- QB – Qualified for Final B

Athlete	Event	Heat		Final	
Athlete	Event	Time	Rank	Time	Rank
Esteban Pizarro	Men's 100 m butterfly	55.10	17 q	54.71	15
Esteban Pizarro	Men's 200 m individual medley	2:07.39	16 q	2:06.21	14
María José Pinto	Women's 50 m freestyle	26.89	23	Did not advance	

== Taekwondo ==
Bolivia qualified two female athletes during the Pan American Games Qualification Tournament.

Kyorugi

Women

Athlete	Event	Round of 16	Quarterfinals	Semifinals	Repechage	Final / BM	
Athlete	Event	Opposition Result	Opposition Result	Opposition Result	Opposition Result	Opposition Result	Rank
María Jireh Hurtado	–49 kg	Orozco (CAN); W 2–0	Grippoli (URU); L 1–2	Did not advance			
Maria Celeste Añez	–57 kg	Lindo Alvarez (CRC); W 2–1	Carstens (PAN); L 0–2	Did not advance			

== Tennis ==
Bolivia qualified two tennis players (one man and one woman).

Athlete	Event	Round of 64	Round of 32	Round of 16	Quarterfinal	Semifinal	Final / BM	
Athlete	Event	Opposition Result	Opposition Result	Opposition Result	Opposition Result	Opposition Result	Opposition Result	Rank
Federico Zeballos	Men's singles	Bye	Bagnis (ARG); L 2–6, 7–6^{(7–4)}, 7–6	Did not advance				
Noelia Zeballos	Women's singles	Bye	Pérez (COL); W 6–0, 7–5, 7–6	Meligeni Alves (BRA); L 4–6, 2–6	Did not advance			

== Triathlon ==
Bolivia qualified a male triathlete.

Athlete	Event	Swim (1.5 km)	Trans 1	Bike (40 km)	Trans 2	Run (10 km)	Total	Rank
Rodrigo Leaño	Men's individual	21:21	0:56	Did not finish				

== Volleyball ==
Beach

Bolivia qualified a men's pair for a total of two athletes.

Athlete	Event	Group stage				Round of 16	Quarterfinal	Semifinal	Final / BM	
Athlete	Event	Opposition Result	Opposition Result	Opposition Result	Rank	Opposition Result	Opposition Result	Opposition Result	Opposition Result	Rank
Luis Calvo; Ruddy Salvatierra	Men's	Webber / Smith (USA); L 0–2 (15–21, 15–21)	Hannibal / Llambias (URU); L 0–2 (16–21, 21–23)	Betancourt / Leonardo (EAI); W 2–0 (21–15, 21–14)	3 q	León / Tenorio (ECU); L 0–2 (21–23, 10–21)	9th-10th semifinals Murray / Noriega (COL); L 1–2 (21–19, 15–21, 10–15)	11th place match Massare / Melgarejo (PAR); L 0–2 (14–21, 20–22)	Did not advance	12

== Weightlifting ==
Bolivia qualified three weightlifters (one man and two women).

Men

Athlete	Event	Snatch		Clean & Jerk		Total	Rank
Athlete	Event	Result	Rank	Result	Rank	Total	Rank
Eduardo Noriega	+102 kg	140	9	160	9	300	9

Women

Athlete	Event	Snatch		Clean & Jerk		Total	Rank
Athlete	Event	Result	Rank	Result	Rank	Total	Rank
Yessica Torrez	49 kg	63	8	90	=5	153	8
Natalia Rivero	71 kg	72	15	93	15	165	15

== Wrestling ==
Bolivia qualified one wrestler.

Key:

- VT – Victory by fall.
- PP – Decision by points – the loser with technical points.
- PO – Decision by points – the loser without technical points.
- SP – Technical superiority – the loser with technical points and a margin of victory of at least 9 (Greco-Roman) or 10 (freestyle) points.
- ST – Great superiority – the loser without technical points and a margin of victory of at least 8 (Greco-Roman) or 10 (freestyle) points.
- VA – Decision by withdrawal

Men

Athlete	Event	Quarterfinal	Semifinal	Final / BM	
Athlete	Event	Opposition Result	Opposition Result	Opposition Result	Rank
Marvin Chávez Claros	Freestyle 65 kg	Destribats (ARG); L 0–11	Did not advance		

== Demonstration Sports ==
=== E-sports ===
Uruguay qualified one athlete.

Men

- Bryan Salvatierra

== See also ==
- Bolivia at the 2024 Summer Olympics
