= Racquetball at the 2023 Pan American Games =

- Racquetball pictogram
- Venue: Racket Sports Center
- Start date: October 21, 2023
- End date: October 26, 2023
- No. of events: 7 (3 men, 3 women, 1 mixed)
- Competitors: 48 from 11 nations

Racquetball competitions at the 2023 Pan American Games in Santiago, Chile is being held between October 21 and 26 at the Racket Sports Center.

Seven medal events were contested, a singles, doubles and team events for both men and women and a mixed doubles event. This was the first time that mixed doubles racquetball was played at the Pan American Games. A total of 50 athletes competed at the games.

== Qualification ==
A total of 48 racquetball athletes will qualify to compete. Each nation may enter a maximum of 4 athletes (two per gender). In each gender there will be a total of 24 athletes qualified, with the 2023 Pan American Championships being used to determine the countries qualified. Chile as host nation qualified the maximum quota automatically.

== Participating nations ==
A total of 11 countries qualified athletes.

- Argentina (5)
- Bolivia (6)
- Canada (4)
- Chile (6)
- Costa Rica (4)
- Cuba (4)
- Dominican Republic (2)
- Ecuador (4)
- Independent Athletes Team (4)
- Mexico (6)
- United States (5)

== Medal summary ==
=== Medal table ===
* Host nation (Chile)

Rank	NOC's	Gold	Silver	Bronze	Total
1	Mexico	3	1	5	9
2	Bolivia	2	1	2	5
3	Independent Athletes Team	1	0	2	3
3	United States	1	0	2	3
5	Argentina	0	3	1	4
6	Canada	0	2	0	2
7	Costa Rica	0	0	2	2
Totals (7 entries)		7	7	14	28

=== Medalists ===
==== Men's events ====
Event	Gold	Silver	Bronze
Men's singles	Conrrado Moscoso; Bolivia	Carlos Keller; Bolivia	Eduardo Portillo; Mexico
Men's singles	Conrrado Moscoso; Bolivia	Carlos Keller; Bolivia	Rodrigo Montoya; Mexico
Men's doubles	Mexico; Rodrigo Montoya; Javier Mar	Canada; Samuel Murray; Coby Iwaasa	Costa Rica; Andrés Acuña; Gabriel García
Men's doubles	Mexico; Rodrigo Montoya; Javier Mar	Canada; Samuel Murray; Coby Iwaasa	Independent Athletes Team; Juan José Salvatierra; Edwin Galicia
Men's team	Bolivia; Carlos Keller; Kadim Carrasco; Conrrado Moscoso	Canada; Coby Iwaasa; Samuel Murray	United States; Daniel De La Rosa; Alejandro Landa; Adam Manilla
Men's team	Bolivia; Carlos Keller; Kadim Carrasco; Conrrado Moscoso	Canada; Coby Iwaasa; Samuel Murray	Mexico; Javier Mar; Rodrigo Montoya; Eduardo Portillo

==== Women's events ====
Event	Gold	Silver	Bronze
Women's singles	Paola Longoria; Mexico	Montserrat Mejía; Mexico	Maricruz Ortiz; Costa Rica
Women's singles	Paola Longoria; Mexico	Montserrat Mejía; Mexico	María José Vargas; Argentina
Women's doubles	Independent Athletes Team; Gabriela Martínez; María Renée Rodríguez	Argentina; María José Vargas; Natalia Méndez	Mexico; Alexandra Herrera; Montserrat Mejía
Women's doubles	Independent Athletes Team; Gabriela Martínez; María Renée Rodríguez	Argentina; María José Vargas; Natalia Méndez	Bolivia; Angélica Barrios; Jenny Daza
Women's team	Mexico; Paola Longoria; Montserrat Mejia; Alexandra Herrera	Argentina; Natalia Mendez; Maria Jose Vargas	United States; Erika Manilla; Michelle Key
Women's team	Mexico; Paola Longoria; Montserrat Mejia; Alexandra Herrera	Argentina; Natalia Mendez; Maria Jose Vargas	Independent Athletes Team; Gabriela Martinez; María Renée Rodríguez

=== Mixed events ===
Event	Gold	Silver	Bronze
Mixed doubles	United States; Adam Manilla; Erika Manilla	Argentina; Diego García; María José Vargas	Bolivia; Conrrado Moscoso; Angélica Barrios
Mixed doubles	United States; Adam Manilla; Erika Manilla	Argentina; Diego García; María José Vargas	Mexico; Eduardo Portillo; Paola Longoria
