= Michelle Key =

American racquetball player

Personal information
- Nationality: American
- Born: August 18, 1988 (age 38) Phoenix, Arizona

Sport
- Sport: Racquetball

Achievements and titles
- National finals: 2nd 2016 (singles), 2nd 2013 (doubles)
- Highest world ranking: 7th (2014-15)
Medal record
Women's Racquetball
Representing United States
Pan Am Games
Bronze medal – third place	2023 Santiago	Team
Silver medal – second place	2015 Toronto	Team
Pan Am Championships
Bronze medal – third place	2025 Guatemala City	Doubles
Bronze medal – third place	2025 Guatemala City	Team
Gold medal – first place	2024 Guatemala City	Mixed Doubles
Bronze medal – third place	2024 Guatemala City	Team
Silver medal – second place	2016 San Luis Potosi	Doubles

Michelle Key (born August 18, 1988) is an American racquetball player. Key is a former Pan American Champion in Mixed Doubles (with Sam Bredenbeck). She also has two medals from the Pan American Games. She earned silver in the Women's Team event in Toronto in 2015 and bronze in the Women's Team event in Santiago in 2023. Key was ranked 7th at the end of the 2014-15 Ladies Professional Racquetball Tour (LPRT) season.

== Racquetball ==
Key is a right handed player.

Competing at the 2006 International Racquetball World Junior Championships in Arizona, Key won her age group in the singles event. Key also participated in the 3 Wallball World Championships in Las Vegas, Nevada in 2014. Key was back to compete at the 2016 edition of the 3 Wallball World Championships, where she defeated Paola Longoria in the semi-finals.

=== International career ===
Key earned her first call up to the United States junior team in 2004, and was a member of the team for over three years.

Key competed at the 2014 World Championships in the singles event, where she won a silver medal.

Key has competed for the USA three times. She was on Team USA at the 2015 Pan American Games in Toronto, where she played Women's Singles. Key lost two of her three matches in the group stage. Her sole win was against Canada's Jennifer Saunders. As a result, was seeded against her teammate Rhonda Rajsich in the Round of 16 in playoffs. Rajsich won that match 15-8, 15-7. However, in the Women's Team event Key helped the USA get the silver medal. Key's win over Canadian Jennifer Saunders, 15-2, 15-6, in the semi-finals, put the USA into the final. But in the first match of the final, Key lost to Samantha Salas, 15-3, 15-9, and Mexico's Paola Longoria and Samantha Salas who successfully defended their title and defeated the American pair.

Key also represented the USA at the 2016 Pan American Championships in San Luis Potosí, where she partnered with Kelani Bailey in Women's Doubles. They reached the finals with a win over Veronica Sotomayor and Maria Paz Muñoz of Ecuador in the semi-finals, 11-15, 15-14, 11-5. In the final, Key and Bailey lost to the Mexican team of Paola Longoria and Samantha Salas, 15-5, 15-10. Key also played singles in San Luis Potosí, and lost in the quarterfinals to Gabriela Martinez of Guatemala, 15-7, 10-15, 11-7.

Key played Women's Singles for the USA at the 2016 World Championships in Cali, Colombia, where she lost in the Round of 32 to Mariana Tobon of Venezuela, 4-15, 15-9, 11-4. She also lost to Bolivia's Adriana Riveros during the competition.

=== US Championships ===
Key played for the Arizona State University at Intercollegiates. Key was the 2011 USA Racquetball Intercollegiate Champion in Women's Singles, as she defeated Sharon Jackson in the final, 15-11, 15-14. That win avenged a loss to Jackson in the 2010 final. Key also played in the doubles tournament at the 2014 edition of the US Open with Lambert. The pair lost to eventual winners Paola Longoria and Verónica Sotomayor .

Key was runner-up at the 2016 USA Racquetball National Singles Championships in Highlands Ranch, Colorado, where she lost to Rhonda Rajsich in the final, 15-7, 15-7. Key reached the final by defeating Janel Tisinger in the semi-finals, 15-4, 15-13.

Key and her sister Danielle were runners up at the 2013 USA Racquetball National Doubles championship, losing the final to Aimee Ruiz and Janel Tisinger, 15-6, 15-8. They got to the final by upsetting that year's defending champions Rhonda Rajsich and Kim Russell-Waselenchuk, 9-15, 15-5, 11-8.

=== Professional career ===
Key was a top 10 player on Ladies Professional Racquetball Tour in 2014-15. In January 2016, she was ranked eighth in the world.

Perhaps Key's best pro result is a semi-final finish at the 2016 Paola Longoria Experience tournament in San Luis Potosí. She got to the semis by defeating Susana Acosta, 11-5, 11-1, 11-6, in the Round of 16, and Rajsich in the quarterfinals, 11-2, 2-11, 6-11, 11-4, 11-9. In the semi-finals, Key lost to Frédérique Lambert, 11-3, 11-5, 11-3. She also participated in the 2014 edition of the Paola Longoria Experience in the women's double event with Canadian partner Frederique Lambert. The pair opened the tournament with a loss to Mexico's Paola Longoria and Samantha Salas despite winning the first set.

In May 2015, she played doubles with Lambert at a tournament in Herndon, Virginia. The pair finished second after losing in the finals to Paola Longoria and Samantha Salas. Playing again with Lambert, the pair made the finals of the 2015 Battle of the Alamo tournament, finishing second after failing to appear for the final. In 2015, she reached the finals of the Open de Cali in Colombia while playing with Lambert, only to lose to Paola Longoria and Samantha Salas Solis in sets of 10-15, 15-10 and 11-5. In March 2016, she participated in the Zócalo Capitalino tournament. In September 2016, she participated in a tour event in Las Vegas.

== Personal life ==
Key was married to racquetball player Daniel De La Rosa, and has two children. Key's younger sister Danielle has also played elite racquetball.

== See also ==
- List of racquetball players
