= Basque pelota at the 2023 Pan American Games =

- Basque Pelota pictogram
- Venue: Spanish Stadium (es)
- Start date: October 31, 2023
- End date: November 5, 2023
- No. of events: 8 (4 men, 4 women)
- Competitors: 66 from 12 nations

Basque pelota competitions at the 2023 Pan American Games in Santiago, Chile were held at the Spanish Stadium located in Las Condes between October 31 and November 5, 2023.

Eight medal events are scheduled to be contested, two singles and two doubles events for men and women.

== Qualification ==
A total of 66 athletes (33 per gender) will qualify to compete. Each nation may enter a maximum of 12 athletes (six per gender). The host country (Chile) automatically qualified a full team of 12 athletes. There will be a total of two qualification events. The best ranked country of the Americas in each event of the Biarritz 2022 Absolute World Basque Pelota Championship will secure a spot. The second event is the 2023 Pan American Basque Pelota Tournament, in which 21 men and 21 women will be qualified.

== Participating nations ==
A total of 12 countries qualified athletes.

- Argentina (10)
- Bolivia (2)
- Brazil (1)
- Chile (12) (host)
- Costa Rica (1)
- Cuba (6)
- Independent Athletes Team (1)
- Mexico (12)
- Peru (7)
- United States (3)
- Uruguay (7)
- Venezuela (4)

== Medal summary ==
=== Medal table ===
* Host nation (Chile)

Rank	NOC	Gold	Silver	Bronze	Total
1	Mexico	6	2	0	8
2	Argentina	2	2	2	6
3	Cuba	0	2	0	2
4	Uruguay	0	1	1	2
5	United States	0	1	0	1
6	Chile*	0	0	4	4
7	Brazil	0	0	1	1
Totals (7 entries)		8	8	8	24

=== Medalists ===
Men's events

Event	Gold	Silver	Bronze
Doubles trinquete rubber ball	Argentina; Facundo Andreasen; Alfredo Villegas	Mexico; Arturo Rodríguez; Daniel García	Chile; Julián Stabon; Esteban Romero
Individual fronton rubber ball	Isaac Pérez; Mexico	Federico Fernández; Argentina	Renato Bolelli; Chile
Doubles frontenis	Mexico; Isaac Cruz; Jorge Olvera	United States; Osmar Espinoza; Salvador Espinoza	Argentina; Lorenzo Cardozo; Emiliano García
Frontball	David Álvarez; Mexico	Cristian Abreu; Cuba	Filipe Otheguy; Brazil

Women's events

Event	Gold	Silver	Bronze
Doubles trinquete rubber ball	Argentina; María García; Cynthia Pinto	Mexico; Dulce Figueroa; Laura Puentes	Uruguay; Sofía Vicente; Agustina Cuestas
Individual fronton rubber ball	Marifer Noriega; Mexico	Sabrina Andrade; Argentina	Rosario Valderrama; Chile
Doubles frontenis	Mexico; Ximena Placito; Ariana Cepeda	Cuba; Daniela Darriba; Wendy Durán	Chile; Magdalena Muñoz; Natalia Bozzo
Frontball	Itzel Reyes; Mexico	Leonella Acosta; Uruguay	Micaela Cortéz; Argentina
