= Cuba at the 2023 Pan American Games =

- IOC code: CUB
- NOC: Cuban Olympic Committee

in Santiago, Chile 20 October 2023 – 5 November 2023
- Competitors: 263 in 25 sports
- Flag bearers (opening): Julio César La Cruz & Idalys Ortiz
- Flag bearers (closing): Jorge Campos & Yunisleidy García
- Medals Ranked 5th: Gold 30 Silver 22 Bronze 17 Total 69

Pan American Games appearances (overview)
- 1951; 1955; 1959; 1963; 1967; 1971; 1975; 1979; 1983; 1987; 1991; 1995; 1999; 2003; 2007; 2011; 2015; 2019; 2023

Cuba competed at the 2023 Pan American Games in Santiago, Chile from October 20 to November 5, 2023. This was Cuba's 19th appearance at the Pan American Games, having competed at every edition of the games since the inaugural edition in 1951.

Boxer Julio César La Cruz and judoka Idalys Ortiz were the country's flagbearers during the opening ceremony. Meanwhile, table tennis athlete Jorge Campos and track athlete Yunisleidy García were the country's flagbearers during the closing ceremony.

Cuba left Santiago with 69 medals, securing their worst performance since 1967, when they won 46 medals. The 30 gold medals were also Cuba's lowest tally since 1971. As a result, the country finished 5th in the medal table, narrowly above Colombia with just only 1 more gold medal.

== Competitors ==
The following is the list of number of competitors (per gender) participating at the games per sport/discipline.

| Sport | Men | Women | Total |
|---|---|---|---|
| Archery | 3 | 3 | 6 |
| Artistic swimming | 1 | 8 | 9 |
| Badminton | 2 | 2 | 4 |
| Baseball | 24 | 0 | 24 |
| Basque pelota | 2 | 4 | 6 |
| Boxing | 7 | 3 | 10 |
| Canoeing | 7 | 6 | 13 |
| Cycling | 0 | 2 | 2 |
| Fencing | 3 | 1 | 4 |
| Field hockey | 0 | 16 | 16 |
| Gymnastics | 5 | 1 | 6 |
| Handball | 14 | 14 | 28 |
| Judo | 8 | 8 | 16 |
| Karate | 1 | 2 | 3 |
| Modern pentathlon | 3 | 2 | 5 |
| Racquetball | 2 | 2 | 4 |
| Roller sports | 1 | 2 | 3 |
| Rowing | 10 | 4 | 14 |
| Sailing | 1 | 3 | 4 |
| Shooting | 7 | 7 | 14 |
| Softball | 0 | 18 | 18 |
| Table tennis | 3 | 3 | 6 |
| Taekwondo | 4 | 4 | 8 |
| Triathlon | 2 | 2 | 4 |
| Volleyball | 12 | 0 | 12 |
| Water polo | 12 | 12 | 24 |
| Weightlifting | 3 | 3 | 6 |
| Wrestling | 12 | 6 | 18 |
| Total | 149 | 138 | 287 |

== Medalists ==
The following Cuban competitors won medals at the games. In the by discipline sections below, medalists' names are bolded.

| Medal | Name | Sport | Event | Date |
|---|---|---|---|---|
| Gold | Arley Calderón | Weightlifting | Men's –61 kg | October 21 |
| Gold | Leuris Pupo | Shooting | Men's 25 metre rapid fire pistol | October 22 |
| Gold | Roberto Paz; Luis León; Henry Heredia; Francisco Romero; Andrey Barnet; Leduar Suárez; Carlos Ajete; Reidy Cardona; Juan González La O | Rowing | Men's eight | October 23 |
| Silver | Arlenis Sierra | Cycling | Women's road time trial | October 22 |
| Silver | Juan Carlos Zaldívar | Weightlifting | Men's –102 kg | October 23 |
| Bronze | Kelvin Calderón | Taekwondo | Men's –80 kg | October 22 |
| Bronze | Olfides Sáez | Weightlifting | Men's –89 kg | October 22 |

== Archery ==
Cuba qualified six archers (three men and three women) during the 2023 Copa Merengue.

Men

| Athlete | Event | Ranking Round | | Round of 32 | Round of 16 | Quarterfinals | Semifinals | Final / BM | Rank |
| Athlete | Event | Score | Seed | Opposition Score | Opposition Score | Opposition Score | Opposition Score | Opposition Score | Rank |
|---|---|---|---|---|---|---|---|---|---|
| | Individual recurve | | | | | | | | |
| | Team recurve | | | —N/a | | | | | |

Women

| Athlete | Event | Ranking Round | | Round of 32 | Round of 16 | Quarterfinals | Semifinals | Final / BM | Rank |
| Athlete | Event | Score | Seed | Opposition Score | Opposition Score | Opposition Score | Opposition Score | Opposition Score | Rank |
|---|---|---|---|---|---|---|---|---|---|
| | Individual recurve | | | | | | | | |
| | Team recurve | | | —N/a | | | | | |

Mixed

| Athlete | Event | Ranking Round | | Round of 32 | Round of 16 | Quarterfinals | Semifinals | Final / BM | Rank |
| Athlete | Event | Score | Seed | Opposition Score | Opposition Score | Opposition Score | Opposition Score | Opposition Score | Rank |
|---|---|---|---|---|---|---|---|---|---|
| | Team recurve | | | —N/a | | | | | |

== Artistic swimming ==
Cuba qualified a full team of nine artistic swimmers after the 2022 Central American and Caribbean Games.

| Athlete | Event | Technical Routine | | Free Routine (Final) | | | |
| Athlete | Event | Points | Rank | Points | Rank | Total Points | Rank |
|---|---|---|---|---|---|---|---|
| Dayaris Varona; Gabriela Alpajón | Women's duet | | | | | | |
| Alejandra Molina; Andy Ávila; Dayaris Varona; Gabriela Alpajón; Gabriela Batista; Kamila Frías; Nathaly Ramos; Soila Valdés; Talia Joa | Women's team | | | | | | |

== Badminton ==
Cuba qualified a team of four athletes (two men and two women).

Men

| Athlete | Event | First round | Second round | Quarterfinals | Semifinals | Final | Rank |
| Athlete | Event | Opposition Result | Opposition Result | Opposition Result | Opposition Result | Opposition Result | Rank |
|---|---|---|---|---|---|---|---|
| Juan Bencomo | Singles | Frank Barrios (VEN) | | | | | |
| Roberto Herrera | Singles | Kennie King (BAR) | | | | | |
| Juan Bencomo; Roberto Herrera | Men's doubles | Yonatan Linarez (DOM); Angel Marinez Ulloa (DOM) | —N/a | | | | |

Women

| Athlete | Event | First round | Second round | Quarterfinals | Semifinals | Final | Rank |
| Athlete | Event | Opposition Result | Opposition Result | Opposition Result | Opposition Result | Opposition Result | Rank |
|---|---|---|---|---|---|---|---|
| Yeily Ortiz | Singles | Bye | Rachel Chan (CAN) | | | | |
| Taymara Oropesa | Singles | Bye | Valeria Santos (CHI) | | | | |
| Yeily Ortiz; Taymara Oropesa | Women's doubles | Diana Corleto Soto (GUA); Nikte Sotomayor (GUA) | —N/a | | | | |

Mixed

| Athlete | Event | First round | Second round | Quarterfinals | Semifinals | Final | Rank |
| Athlete | Event | Opposition Result | Opposition Result | Opposition Result | Opposition Result | Opposition Result | Rank |
|---|---|---|---|---|---|---|---|
| Roberto Herrera; Taymara Oropesa | Mixed doubles | Montoya (MEX); Rodríguez (MEX) | | | | | |
| Juan Bencomo; Yeily Ortiz | Mixed doubles | Evans (JAM); Wynter (JAM) | | | | | |

== Baseball ==
Summary

| Team | Event | Preliminary round | | | | Semifinal | Final / BM / Pl. | |
| Team | Event | Opposition Result | Opposition Result | Opposition Result | Rank | Opposition Result | Opposition Result | Rank |
|---|---|---|---|---|---|---|---|---|
| Cuba men | Men's tournament | Colombia | Venezuela | Brazil | | | | |

Cuba qualified a men's team (of 24 athletes) by finishing second in the 2023 Central American and Caribbean Games.

Group B

| Pos | Team | Pld | W | L | RF | RA | PCT | GB | Qualification |
|---|---|---|---|---|---|---|---|---|---|
| 1 | Brazil | 3 | 3 | 0 | 15 | 10 | **1.000** | — | Super Round |
| 2 | Colombia | 3 | 1 | 2 | 16 | 14 | **.333** | 2 | Super Round |
| 3 | Cuba | 3 | 1 | 2 | 11 | 13 | **.333** | 2 | Fifth place game |
| 4 | Venezuela | 3 | 1 | 2 | 9 | 14 | **.333** | 2 | Seventh place game |

Source: Santiago 2023 and WBSC Americas

| October 20; 9:30 | Colombia | **3–4** | Cuba | Parque Bicentenario de Cerrillos, Cerrillos |
| October 20; 9:30 | | Boxscore | | Parque Bicentenario de Cerrillos, Cerrillos |

| October 22; 15:00 | Cuba | **5–6** | Venezuela | Parque Bicentenario de Cerrillos, Cerrillos |
| October 22; 15:00 | | Boxscore | | Parque Bicentenario de Cerrillos, Cerrillos |

| October 24; 9:30 | Brazil | **4–2** | Cuba | Parque Bicentenario de Cerrillos, Cerrillos |
| October 24; 9:30 | | Boxscore | | Parque Bicentenario de Cerrillos, Cerrillos |

== Basque pelota ==
Cuba qualified a team of six athletes (two men and four women) through the 2023 Pan American Basque Pelota Tournament.

Men

| Athlete | Event | Preliminary round | | | | | Semifinal | Final / BM | Rank |
| Athlete | Event | Match 1 | Match 2 | Match 3 | Match 4 | Rank | Semifinal | Final / BM | Rank |
| Athlete | Event | Opposition Score | Opposition Score | Opposition Score | Opposition Score | Rank | Opposition Score | Opposition Score | Rank |
|---|---|---|---|---|---|---|---|---|---|
| Alejandro González | Fronton | | | | | | | | |
| Cristian Abréu | Frontball | | | | | | | | |

Women

| Athlete | Event | Preliminary round | | | | | Semifinal | Final / BM | Rank |
| Athlete | Event | Match 1 | Match 2 | Match 3 | Match 4 | Rank | Semifinal | Final / BM | Rank |
| Athlete | Event | Opposition Score | Opposition Score | Opposition Score | Opposition Score | Rank | Opposition Score | Opposition Score | Rank |
|---|---|---|---|---|---|---|---|---|---|
| Laura Álvarez | Fronton | | | | | | | | |
| Daniela Darriba; Wendy Durán | Doubles Frontenis | | | | | | | | |
| Yalieska Leoncio | Frontball | | | | | | | | |

== Boxing ==
Cuba qualified 10 boxers (seven men and three women).

Men

| Athlete | Event | Round of 32 | Round of 16 | Quarterfinals | Semifinals | Final | Rank |
| Athlete | Event | Opposition Result | Opposition Result | Opposition Result | Opposition Result | Opposition Result | Rank |
|---|---|---|---|---|---|---|---|
| Alejandro Claro | –51 kg | | | | | | |
| Saidel Horta | –57 kg | —N/a | Vega (MEX); **W** 5–0 | González (COL) | | | |
| Lázaro Álvarez | –63.5 kg | | | | | | |
| Jorge Cuellar | –71 kg | | | | | | |
| Arlen López | –80 kg | | | | | | |
| Julio La Cruz | –92 kg | —N/a | Talley (USA); **W** 5–0 | Salgado (CHI) | | | |
| Fernando Arzola | +92 kg | —N/a | Charles (DMA); **W** WO | Feujio (CAN) | | | |

Women

| Athlete | Event | Round of 32 | Round of 16 | Quarterfinals | Semifinals | Final | Rank |
| Athlete | Event | Opposition Result | Opposition Result | Opposition Result | Opposition Result | Opposition Result | Rank |
|---|---|---|---|---|---|---|---|
| Legnis Calá | –57 kg | | | | | | |
| Arianne Imbert | –66 kg | —N/a | Moronta (DOM); **L** RSC | Did not advance | | | |
| Yakelín Estornell | –75 kg | —N/a | Ortiz (MEX); **L** 0–5 | Did not advance | | | |

== Canoeing ==
=== Sprint ===
Cuba qualified a total of 13 sprint athletes (seven men and six women).

Men

| Athlete | Event | Heat | | Semifinal | | Final | |
| Athlete | Event | Time | Rank | Time | Rank | Time | Rank |
|---|---|---|---|---|---|---|---|
| José Ramón Pelier | C-1 1000 m | | | | | | |
| Elvis Rodríguez | C-1 1000 m | | | | | | |
| José Ramón Pelier; Javier Gil | C-2 500 m | | | | | | |
| Robert Núñez | K-1 1000 m | | | | | | |
| Robert Núñez; Yan López | K-2 500 m | | | | | | |
| Caleb Fábregat; Reyler Porro; Robert Núñez; Yan López | K-4 500 m | —N/a | | | | | |

Women

| Athlete | Event | Heat | | Semifinal | | Final | |
| Athlete | Event | Time | Rank | Time | Rank | Time | Rank |
|---|---|---|---|---|---|---|---|
| Yarisleides Duboy | C-1 200 m | | | | | | |
| Yarisleides Duboy; Yisnoly Lamadrid | C-2 500 m | | | | | | |
| Yurieni Herrera | K-1 500 m | | | | | | |
| Yurieni Herrera; Daylen Pérez | K-2 500 m | | | | | | |
| Camila Aguirre; Madelen Domínguez; Yurieni Herrera; Daylen Pérez | K-4 500 m | —N/a | | | | | |

== Cycling ==
Cuba qualified a total of 2 cyclists (2 women).

=== Road ===
Cuba qualified 1 cyclist at the Caribbean Championships. Cuba also qualified 1 cyclist at the Pan American Championships.

| Athlete | Event | Time | Rank |
|---|---|---|---|
| Arlenis Sierra | Women's road race | | |
| Arlenis Sierra | Women's road time trial | | |
| Claudia Baró | Women's road race | | |

== Diving ==
Women

| Athlete | Event | Preliminary | | Final | |
| Athlete | Event | Points | Rank | Points | Rank |
|---|---|---|---|---|---|
| Anisley García | 10 m Platform | 315.45 | 5 **Q** | | |
| Arlenys García | 10 m Platform | 224.65 | 15 | Did not advance | |

== Fencing ==
Cuba qualified a team of 4 fencers (three men and one woman), through the 2022 Pan American Fencing Championships in Ascuncion, Paraguay.

Individual

| Athlete | Event | Pool Round | | Round of 16 | Quarterfinals | Semifinals | Final | |
| Athlete | Event | Victories | Seed | Opposition Score | Opposition Score | Opposition Score | Opposition Score | Rank |
|---|---|---|---|---|---|---|---|---|
| | Men's épée | | | | | | | |
| | Women's sabre | | | | | | | |

Team

| Athlete | Event | Quarterfinals | Semifinals/Consolation | Final / BM / PM | |
| Athlete | Event | Opposition Score | Opposition Score | Opposition Score | Rank |
|---|---|---|---|---|---|
| | Men's épée | | | | |

== Field hockey ==
Summary

| Team | Event | Preliminary round | | | | Quarterfinal | Semifinal | Final / BM / Pl. | |
| Team | Event | Opposition Result | Opposition Result | Opposition Result | Rank | Opposition Result | Opposition Result | Opposition Result | Rank |
|---|---|---|---|---|---|---|---|---|---|
| Cuba women | Women's tournament | Canada | Mexico | Chile | | | | | |

=== Women's tournament ===
Cuba qualified a women's team of 16 athletes by reaching the final of the 2023 Central American and Caribbean Games.

Group B

| Pos | Team | Pld | W | D | L | GF | GA | GD | Pts | Qualification |
|---|---|---|---|---|---|---|---|---|---|---|
| 1 | Chile (H) | 3 | 3 | 0 | 0 | 14 | 0 | +14 | **9** | Semi-finals |
| 2 | Canada | 3 | 2 | 0 | 1 | 12 | 3 | +9 | **6** | Semi-finals |
| 3 | Cuba | 3 | 0 | 1 | 2 | 2 | 10 | −8 | **1** | 5th–8th classification |
| 4 | Mexico | 3 | 0 | 1 | 2 | 1 | 16 | −15 | **1** | 5th–8th classification |

Source: FIH
Rules for classification: 1) points; 2) matches won; 3) goal difference; 4) goals for; 5) head-to-head result; 6) field goals for.
(H) Hosts

26 October 2023
17:30

| Canada | 7–1 | Cuba |
|---|---|---|
| Thompson 3', 23', 60'; Walton 9', 39'; Rae 30', 46' | Report | Vera 54' |

Umpires:
Maggie Giddens (USA)
Ana Vázquez Escalanté (MEX)

28 October 2023
17:30

| Mexico | 1–1 | Cuba |
|---|---|---|
| Cardiel 34' | Report | Vera 24' |

Umpires:
Meghan McLennan (CAN)
Megan Robertson (CAN)

30 October 2023
19:30

| Chile | 2–0 | Cuba |
|---|---|---|
| Villagrán 9'; Rojas 50' | Report |

Umpires:
Natalia Lodeiro (URU)
Ana Vázquez Esclanté (MEX)

== Gymnastics ==
=== Artistic ===
Cuba qualified a team of five male gymnasts in artistic at the 2023 Pan American Championships.

Men
Team & Individual Qualification

| Athlete | Event | Final | | | | | | | |
| Athlete | Event | Apparatus | | | | | | Total | Rank |
| Athlete | Event | F | PH | R | V | PB | HB | Total | Rank |
|---|---|---|---|---|---|---|---|---|---|
| | Team | | | | | | | | |
| **Total** | Team | | | | | | | | |

Qualification Legend: Q = Qualified to apparatus final

=== Rhythmic ===
Cuba qualified one individual gymnast.

Individual

| Athlete | Event | Apparatus | | | | Total | |
| Athlete | Event | Ball | Clubs | Hoop | Ribbon | Score | Rank |
|---|---|---|---|---|---|---|---|
| | All-around | | | | | | |
| | Ball | | —N/a | | | | |
| | Clubs | —N/a | | —N/a | | | |
| | Hoop | —N/a | | | —N/a | | |
| | Ribbon | —N/a | | | | | |

== Handball ==
Summary

| Team | Event | Group stage | | | | Semifinal | Final / BM / Pl. | |
| Team | Event | Opposition Result | Opposition Result | Opposition Result | Rank | Opposition Result | Opposition Result | Rank |
|---|---|---|---|---|---|---|---|---|
| Cuba men | Men's tournament | Uruguay | United States | Argentina | | | | |
| Cuba women | Women's tournament | Uruguay | Paraguay | Brazil | | | | |

=== Men's tournament ===
Cuba qualified a men's team (of 14 athletes) by reaching the final of the 2023 Central American and Caribbean Games.

Group B

| Pos | Team | Pld | W | D | L | GF | GA | GD | Pts | Qualification |
|---|---|---|---|---|---|---|---|---|---|---|
| 1 | Argentina | 3 | 3 | 0 | 0 | 93 | 50 | +43 | **6** | Semifinals |
| 2 | United States | 3 | 2 | 0 | 1 | 78 | 86 | −8 | **4** | Semifinals |
| 3 | Uruguay | 3 | 1 | 0 | 2 | 71 | 95 | −24 | **2** | 5–8th place semifinals |
| 4 | Cuba | 3 | 0 | 0 | 3 | 72 | 83 | −11 | **0** | 5–8th place semifinals |

Source: Santiago 2023
Rules for classification: 1) points; 2) head-to-head points; 3) head-to-head goal difference; 4) head-to-head goals scored; 5) goal difference; 6) goals scored; 7) draw.

| 30 October 2023; 10:00 | **Cuba** | **24–25** | **Uruguay** | Gimnasio Polideportivo de Viña del Mar; Referees: Hansen, Madsen (DEN) |
| 30 October 2023; 10:00 | Cordiés 8 | (13–13) | Rubbo 9 | Gimnasio Polideportivo de Viña del Mar; Referees: Hansen, Madsen (DEN) |
| 30 October 2023; 10:00 | 1× (yellow card) 2× (suspension) | Report | | Gimnasio Polideportivo de Viña del Mar; Referees: Hansen, Madsen (DEN) |

| 31 October 2023; 10:00 | **United States** | **30–28** | **Cuba** | Gimnasio Polideportivo de Viña del Mar; Referees: Correa, Conberse (ARG) |
| 31 October 2023; 10:00 | Hoddersen 13 | (17–14) | Cordiés 8 | Gimnasio Polideportivo de Viña del Mar; Referees: Correa, Conberse (ARG) |
| 31 October 2023; 10:00 | 1× (suspension) | Report | 1× (yellow card) 3× (suspension) | Gimnasio Polideportivo de Viña del Mar; Referees: Correa, Conberse (ARG) |

| 1 November 2023; 12:30 | **Argentina** | **28–20** | **Cuba** | Gimnasio Polideportivo de Viña del Mar; Referees: Araújo, Perdomo (URU) |
| 1 November 2023; 12:30 | F. Pizarro 7 | (14–9) | Vázquez 4 | Gimnasio Polideportivo de Viña del Mar; Referees: Araújo, Perdomo (URU) |
| 1 November 2023; 12:30 | 1× (yellow card) 2× (suspension) | Report | 1× (yellow card) 2× (suspension) 1× (red card) | Gimnasio Polideportivo de Viña del Mar; Referees: Araújo, Perdomo (URU) |

=== Women's tournament ===
Cuba qualified a women's team (of 14 athletes) by reaching the final of the 2023 Central American and Caribbean Games.

Group B

| Pos | Team | Pld | W | D | L | GF | GA | GD | Pts | Qualification |
|---|---|---|---|---|---|---|---|---|---|---|
| 1 | Brazil | 3 | 3 | 0 | 0 | 104 | 35 | +69 | **6** | Semifinals |
| 2 | Paraguay | 3 | 1 | 0 | 2 | 68 | 76 | −8 | **2 (Note: Paraguay 2 Pts, +4 GD; Cuba 2 Pts, –1 GD; Uruguay 2 Pts, –3 GD)** | Semifinals |
| 3 | Cuba | 3 | 1 | 0 | 2 | 62 | 101 | −39 | **2** | 5–8th place semifinals |
| 4 | Uruguay | 3 | 1 | 0 | 2 | 53 | 75 | −22 | **2** | 5–8th place semifinals |

Source: Santiago 2023
Rules for classification: 1) points; 2) head-to-head points; 3) head-to-head goal difference; 4) head-to-head goals scored; 5) goal difference; 6) goals scored; 7) draw.
Notes:

| 24 October 2023; 10:00 | **Cuba** | **25–21** | **Uruguay** | Gimnasio Polideportivo de Viña del Mar; Referees: Hansen, Madsen (DEN) |
| 24 October 2023; 10:00 | Reyes, Téllez 5 | (13–6) | Barreiro 5 | Gimnasio Polideportivo de Viña del Mar; Referees: Hansen, Madsen (DEN) |
| 24 October 2023; 10:00 | 7× (suspension) | Report | 2× (suspension) | Gimnasio Polideportivo de Viña del Mar; Referees: Hansen, Madsen (DEN) |

| 25 October 2023; 12:30 | **Paraguay** | **31–26** | **Cuba** | Gimnasio Polideportivo de Viña del Mar; Referees: García, Paolantoni (ARG) |
| 25 October 2023; 12:30 | Fernández, Leiva 6 | (17–13) | Amorós 9 | Gimnasio Polideportivo de Viña del Mar; Referees: García, Paolantoni (ARG) |
| 25 October 2023; 12:30 | 1× (yellow card) 1× (suspension) | Report | 2× (suspension) | Gimnasio Polideportivo de Viña del Mar; Referees: García, Paolantoni (ARG) |

| 26 October 2023; 12:30 | **Brazil** | **49–11** | **Cuba** | Gimnasio Polideportivo de Viña del Mar; Referees: Sosa, Lemes (URU) |
| 26 October 2023; 12:30 | Castro 10 | (26–6) | Toledo 3 | Gimnasio Polideportivo de Viña del Mar; Referees: Sosa, Lemes (URU) |
| 26 October 2023; 12:30 | 4× (suspension) | Report | 3× (suspension) | Gimnasio Polideportivo de Viña del Mar; Referees: Sosa, Lemes (URU) |

== Judo ==
Cuba has qualified 16 judokas (eight men and eight women).

Men

| Athlete | Event | Round of 16 | Quarterfinals | Semifinals | Repechage | Final / BM | |
| Athlete | Event | Opposition Result | Opposition Result | Opposition Result | Opposition Result | Opposition Result | Rank |
|---|---|---|---|---|---|---|---|
| | −60 kg | | | | | | |
| | −66 kg | | | | | | |
| | −73 kg | | | | | | |
| | −81 kg | | | | | | |
| | −90 kg | | | | | | |
| | −100 kg | | | | | | |
| Omar Cruz | +100 kg | | | | | | |

Women

| Athlete | Event | Round of 16 | Quarterfinals | Semifinals | Repechage | Final / BM | |
| Athlete | Event | Opposition Result | Opposition Result | Opposition Result | Opposition Result | Opposition Result | Rank |
|---|---|---|---|---|---|---|---|
| | −48 kg | | | | | | |
| | −52 kg | | | | | | |
| | −57 kg | | | | | | |
| | −63 kg | | | | | | |
| | −70 kg | | | | | | |
| | −78 kg | | | | | | |
| Thalia Nariño Castellano | +78 kg | | | | | | |

Mixed

| Athlete | Event | Round of 16 | Quarterfinal | Semifinal | Repechage | Final / BM | |
| Athlete | Event | Opposition Result | Opposition Result | Opposition Result | Opposition Result | Opposition Result | Rank |
|---|---|---|---|---|---|---|---|
| | Team | | | | | | |

== Karate ==
Cuba qualified three athletes (one man and two women) in the 2023 Central American and Caribbean Championship and the 2023 Pan American Championships.

Kumite

| Athlete | Event | Round robin | | | | Semifinal | Final | |
| Athlete | Event | Opposition Result | Opposition Result | Opposition Result | Rank | Opposition Result | Opposition Result | Rank |
|---|---|---|---|---|---|---|---|---|
| Brayan Díaz | Men's −60 kg | | | | | | | |
| Baurelys Torres | Women's −55 kg | | | | | | | |
| Lianerkis Chacón | Women's −61 kg | | | | | | | |

== Modern pentathlon ==
Cuba qualified five modern pentathletes (three men and two women).

| Athlete | Event | Fencing (Épée one touch) | | | | Swimming (200 m freestyle) | | | Riding (Show jumping) | | | Shooting / Running (10 m laser pistol / 3000 m cross-country) | | | Total | |
| Athlete | Event | V – D | Rank | MP points | BP | Time | Rank | MP points | Penalties | Rank | MP points | Time | Rank | MP points | MP points | Rank |
|---|---|---|---|---|---|---|---|---|---|---|---|---|---|---|---|---|
| Juan Pablo Velázquez | Men's individual | | | | | | | | | | | | | | | |
| Lester Rosário | Men's individual | | | | | | | | | | | | | | | |
| Marcos Rojas | Men's individual | | | | | | | | | | | | | | | |
| Lester Rosário; Marcos Rojas | Men's relay | | | | | | | | | | | | | | | |
| Dalia Pérez | Women's individual | | | | | | | | | | | | | | | |
| Diana Leyva | Women's individual | | | | | | | | | | | | | | | |
| Dalia Pérez; Diana Leyva | Women's relay | | | | | | | | | | | | | | | |
| Juan Pablo Velázquez; Dalia Pérez | Mixed relay | | | | | | | | | | | | | | | |

== Racquetball ==
Cuba qualified a team of four racquetball players (two men and two women).

| Athlete | Event | Preliminary round | | | | Round of 16 | Quarterfinal | Semifinal | Final | |
| Athlete | Event | Opposition Result | Opposition Result | Opposition Result | Rank | Opposition Result | Opposition Result | Opposition Result | Opposition Result | Rank |
|---|---|---|---|---|---|---|---|---|---|---|
| Maykel Moyet | Men's singles | | | | | | | | | |
| Yandy Espinosa | Men's singles | | | | | | | | | |
| Maykel Moyet; Yandy Espinosa | Men's doubles | | | | | | | | | |
| Maykel Moyet; Yandy Espinosa | Men's team | —N/a | | | | | | | | |
| Samira Ferrer | Women's singles | | | | | | | | | |
| Kylie Larduet | Women's singles | | | | | | | | | |
| Samira Ferrer; Kylie Larduet | Women's doubles | | | | | | | | | |
| Samira Ferrer; Kylie Larduet | Women's team | —N/a | | | | | | | | |
| Maykel Moyet; Samira Ferrer | Mixed doubles | | | | | | | | | |

== Roller sports ==
=== Speed ===
Men

| Athlete | Event | Preliminary | | Semifinal | | Final | |
| Athlete | Event | Time | Rank | Time | Rank | Time | Rank |
|---|---|---|---|---|---|---|---|
| Dayan Millán | 1000 m sprint | | | | | | |
| Dayan Millán | 10,000 m elimination | —N/a | | | | | |

Women

| Athlete | Event | Preliminary | | Semifinal | | Final | |
| Athlete | Event | Time | Rank | Time | Rank | Time | Rank |
|---|---|---|---|---|---|---|---|
| Adriana Cantillo | 200 m time trial | | | | | | |
| Adriana Cantillo | 500 m | | | | | | |
| Rocío Proenza | 1000 m sprint | | | | | | |
| Rocío Proenza | 10,000 m elimination | —N/a | | | | | |

== Rowing ==
Cuba qualified a team of 14 athletes (ten men and four women).

Men

| Athlete | Event | Heat | | Repechage | | Semifinal | | Final A/B | |
| Athlete | Event | Time | Rank | Time | Rank | Time | Rank | Time | Rank |
|---|---|---|---|---|---|---|---|---|---|
| | Single sculls | | | | | | | | |
| | Double sculls | | | | | —N/a | | | |
| | Quadruple sculls | | | —N/a | | | | | |
| | Pair | | | —N/a | | | | | |
| | Four | | | —N/a | | | | | |
| | Lightweight Double sculls | | | | | —N/a | | | |

Women

| Athlete | Event | Heat | | Repechage | | Semifinal | | Final A/B | |
| Athlete | Event | Time | Rank | Time | Rank | Time | Rank | Time | Rank |
|---|---|---|---|---|---|---|---|---|---|
| | Single sculls | | | | | | | | |
| | Double sculls | | | | | —N/a | | | |
| | Quadruple sculls | | | —N/a | | | | | |

== Sailing ==
Cuba qualified 3 boats for a total of 4 sailors.

Women

| Athlete | Event | Race | | | | | | | | | | | | | Total | |
| Athlete | Event | 1 | 2 | 3 | 4 | 5 | 6 | 7 | 8 | 9 | 10 | 11 | 12 | M | Points | Rank |
|---|---|---|---|---|---|---|---|---|---|---|---|---|---|---|---|---|
| | Laser radial | | | | | | | | | | | —N/a | | | | |
| | Sunfish | | | | | | | | | | | —N/a | | | | |

Mixed

| Athlete | Event | Race | | | | | | | | | | | | | Total | |
| Athlete | Event | 1 | 2 | 3 | 4 | 5 | 6 | 7 | 8 | 9 | 10 | 11 | 12 | M | Points | Rank |
|---|---|---|---|---|---|---|---|---|---|---|---|---|---|---|---|---|
| | Snipe | | | | | | | | | | | —N/a | | | | |

== Shooting ==
Cuba qualified a total of 14 shooters in the 2022 Americas Shooting Championships.

Men

Pistol and rifle

| Athlete | Event | Qualification | | Final | |
| Athlete | Event | Points | Rank | Points | Rank |
|---|---|---|---|---|---|
| | 10 m air pistol | | | | |
| | 25 m rapid fire pistol | | | | |
| | 10 m air rifle | | | | |
| | 50 metre rifle three positions | | | | |

Men

Shotgun

| Athlete | Event | Qualification | | Semifinal | | Final / BM | |
| Athlete | Event | Points | Rank | Points | Rank | Opposition Result | Rank |
|---|---|---|---|---|---|---|---|
| | Skeet | | | | | | |

Women

Pistol and rifle

| Athlete | Event | Qualification | | Final | |
| Athlete | Event | Points | Rank | Points | Rank |
|---|---|---|---|---|---|
| | 10 m air pistol | | | | |
| | 25 m pistol | | | | |
| | 10 m air rifle | | | | |
| | 50 metre rifle three positions | | | | |

== Softball ==
Cuba qualified a women's team (of 18 athletes) by virtue of its campaign in the 2022 Pan American Championships.

Summary

| Team | Event | Preliminary round | | | | Semifinal | Final / BM / Pl. | |
| Team | Event | Opposition Result | Opposition Result | Opposition Result | Rank | Opposition Result | Opposition Result | Rank |
|---|---|---|---|---|---|---|---|---|
| Cuba women | Women's tournament | | | | | | | |

== Table tennis ==
Cuba qualified a full team of six athletes (three men and three women) through the 2023 Caribbean Championships.

Men

| Athlete | Event | Group stage | | | | First round | Second round | Quarterfinal | Semifinal | Final / BM | |
| Athlete | Event | Opposition Result | Opposition Result | Opposition Result | Rank | Opposition Result | Opposition Result | Opposition Result | Opposition Result | Opposition Result | Rank |
|---|---|---|---|---|---|---|---|---|---|---|---|
| Andy Pereira | Singles | —N/a | | | | | | | | | |
| Jorge Campos | Singles | —N/a | | | | | | | | | |
| Andy Pereira; Jorge Campos | Doubles | —N/a | | | | | | | | | |
| Adrián Pérez; Andy Pereira; Jorge Campos | Team | —N/a | | | | —N/a | | | | | |

Women

| Athlete | Event | Group stage | | | | First round | Second round | Quarterfinal | Semifinal | Final / BM | |
| Athlete | Event | Opposition Result | Opposition Result | Opposition Result | Rank | Opposition Result | Opposition Result | Opposition Result | Opposition Result | Opposition Result | Rank |
|---|---|---|---|---|---|---|---|---|---|---|---|
| Daniela Fonseca | Singles | —N/a | | | | | | | | | |
| Estela Crespo | Singles | —N/a | | | | | | | | | |
| Lizdainet Rodríguez | Singles | —N/a | | | | | | | | | |
| Daniela Fonseca; Estela Crespo | Doubles | —N/a | | | | | | | | | |
| Daniela Fonseca; Estela Crespo; Lizdainet Rodríguez | Team | —N/a | | | | —N/a | | | | | |

Mixed

| Athlete | Event | First Round | Quarterfinal | Semifinal | Final / BM | |
| Athlete | Event | Opposition Result | Opposition Result | Opposition Result | Opposition Result | Rank |
|---|---|---|---|---|---|---|
| Jorge Campos; Daniela Fonseca | Doubles | | | | | |

== Taekwondo ==
Cuba qualified 8 athletes (four men and four women) during the Pan American Games Qualification Tournament.

Kyorugi

| Athlete | Event | Round of 16 | Quarterfinals | Semifinals | Repechage | Final/ BM | |
| Athlete | Event | Opposition Result | Opposition Result | Opposition Result | Opposition Result | Opposition Result | Rank |
|---|---|---|---|---|---|---|---|
| | –68 kg | | | | | | |
| | –80 kg | | | | | | |
| | +80 kg | | | | | | |
| | –49 kg | | | | | | |
| | –67 kg | | | | | | |
| | +67 kg | | | | | | |

Poomsae (forms)

| Athlete | Event | Score | Rank |
|---|---|---|---|
| | Men's individual | | |
| | Women's individual | | |
| | Mixed pair | | |

== Triathlon ==
Cuba qualified a triathlon team of four athletes (two men and two women).

| Athlete | Event | Swim (1.5 km) | Trans 1 | Bike (40 km) | Trans 2 | Run (10 km) | Total | Rank |
|---|---|---|---|---|---|---|---|---|
| Alejandro Rodríguez | Men's individual | | | | | | | |
| Kevin Milián | Men's individual | | | | | | | |
| Leslie Amat | Women's individual | | | | | | | |
| Niuska Figueredo | Women's individual | | | | | | | |

Mixed relay

| Athlete | Event | Swimming (300 m) | Transition 1 | Biking (6.6 km) | Transition2 | Running (1.5 km) | Total | Rank |
|---|---|---|---|---|---|---|---|---|
| Leslie Amat | Mixed relay | | | | | | | —N/a |
| Alejandro Rodríguez | Mixed relay | | | | | | | —N/a |
| Kevin Milián | Mixed relay | | | | | | | —N/a |
| Niuska Figueredo | Mixed relay | | | | | | | —N/a |
| **Total** | Mixed relay | —N/a | | | | | | |

== Volleyball ==
=== Men's tournament ===
Cuba qualified a men's team (of 12 athletes) by winning the 2022 Men's Pan-American Volleyball Cup.

Summary

| Team | Event | Group stage | | | | Semifinal | Final / BM / Pl. | |
| Team | Event | Opposition Result | Opposition Result | Opposition Result | Rank | Opposition Result | Opposition Result | Rank |
|---|---|---|---|---|---|---|---|---|
| Cuba men | Men's tournament | | | | | | | |

== Water polo ==
Summary

| Team | Event | Group stage | | | | Semifinal | Final / BM / Pl. | |
| Team | Event | Opposition Result | Opposition Result | Opposition Result | Rank | Opposition Result | Opposition Result | Rank |
|---|---|---|---|---|---|---|---|---|
| Cuba men | Men's tournament | Argentina | Canada | Chile | | | | |
| Cuba women | Women's tournament | Mexico | Canada | Argentina | | | | |

=== Men's tournament ===
Cuba qualified a men's team (of 12 athletes) by reaching the final of the 2023 Central American and Caribbean Games.

Group B

| Pos | Team | Pld | W | PSW | PSL | L | GF | GA | GD | Pts | Qualification |
|---|---|---|---|---|---|---|---|---|---|---|---|
| 1 | Canada | 3 | 3 | 0 | 0 | 0 | 71 | 18 | +53 | **9** | Quarterfinals |
| 2 | Argentina | 3 | 2 | 0 | 0 | 1 | 43 | 21 | +22 | **6** | Quarterfinals |
| 3 | Cuba | 3 | 1 | 0 | 0 | 2 | 24 | 58 | −34 | **3** | Quarterfinals |
| 4 | Chile (H) | 3 | 0 | 0 | 0 | 3 | 16 | 57 | −41 | **0** | Quarterfinals |

Source: Santiago 2023
Rules for classification: 1) points; 2) head-to-head points; 3) head-to-head goal difference; 4) head-to-head number of goals scored; 5) goal difference.
(H) Host

| 30 October 2023; 16:30 | Report | **Argentina** | **20**–4 | Cuba | Aquatic Center, Santiago; Referees: Gomez Portodomingo (ESP); Spiritosanto (USA) |
| 30 October 2023; 16:30 | Report | Score by quarters: **2**–1, **6**–2, **6**–0, **6**–1 | | | Aquatic Center, Santiago; Referees: Gomez Portodomingo (ESP); Spiritosanto (USA) |
| 30 October 2023; 16:30 | Report | Corsi 6 | **Goals** | Ponsa 4 | Aquatic Center, Santiago; Referees: Gomez Portodomingo (ESP); Spiritosanto (USA) |

| 31 October 2023; 16:30 | Report | **Canada** | **29**–7 | Cuba | Aquatic Center, Santiago; Referees: Ohme (GER); Moller (ARG) |
| 31 October 2023; 16:30 | Report | Score by quarters: **5**–1, **8**–3, **8**–3, **8**-0 | | | Aquatic Center, Santiago; Referees: Ohme (GER); Moller (ARG) |
| 31 October 2023; 16:30 | Report | Constantin-Bicari, Côté 6 | **Goals** | Ponsa 4 | Aquatic Center, Santiago; Referees: Ohme (GER); Moller (ARG) |

| 1 November 2023; 19:30 | Report | **Cuba** | **13**–9 | Chile | Aquatic Center, Santiago; Referees: Jorge Rincon Patiño (COL); Yuri Machado (BRA) |
| 1 November 2023; 19:30 | Report | Score by quarters: 2–2, 3–**4**, **4**–1, **4**–1 | | | Aquatic Center, Santiago; Referees: Jorge Rincon Patiño (COL); Yuri Machado (BRA) |
| 1 November 2023; 19:30 | Report | Ponsa 5 | **Goals** | Cárcamo 4 | Aquatic Center, Santiago; Referees: Jorge Rincon Patiño (COL); Yuri Machado (BRA) |

=== Women's tournament ===
Cuba qualified a women's team (of 12 athletes) through the 2022 CCCAN Championships.

Group A

| Pos | Team | Pld | W | PSW | PSL | L | GF | GA | GD | Pts | Qualification |
|---|---|---|---|---|---|---|---|---|---|---|---|
| 1 | Canada | 3 | 3 | 0 | 0 | 0 | 70 | 19 | +51 | **9** | Quarterfinals |
| 2 | Argentina | 3 | 1 | 1 | 0 | 1 | 35 | 37 | −2 | **5** | Quarterfinals |
| 3 | Cuba | 3 | 1 | 0 | 1 | 1 | 34 | 53 | −19 | **4** | Quarterfinals |
| 4 | Mexico | 3 | 0 | 0 | 0 | 3 | 24 | 54 | −30 | **0** | Quarterfinals |

Source: Santiago 2023
Rules for classification: 1) points; 2) head-to-head points; 3) head-to-head goal difference; 4) head-to-head number of goals scored; 5) goal difference.

| 30 October 2023; 8:00 | Report | Mexico | 11–**14** | **Cuba** | Aquatic Center, Santiago; Referees: Danielle Dabbaghian (USA); Frank Ohme (GER) |
| 30 October 2023; 8:00 | Report | Score by quarters: 3–3, 3–**4**, 4–4, 1–**3** | | | Aquatic Center, Santiago; Referees: Danielle Dabbaghian (USA); Frank Ohme (GER) |

| 31 October 2023; 8:00 | Report | **Canada** | **24**–3 | Cuba | Aquatic Center, Santiago; Referees: Harvey Hinds (CUW); Darren Spritosanto (USA) |
| 31 October 2023; 8:00 | Report | Score by quarters: **6**–0, **7**–0, **2**–0, **9**–3 | | | Aquatic Center, Santiago; Referees: Harvey Hinds (CUW); Darren Spritosanto (USA) |
| 31 October 2023; 8:00 | Report | three players 4 | **Goals** | three players 1 | Aquatic Center, Santiago; Referees: Harvey Hinds (CUW); Darren Spritosanto (USA) |

| 1 November 2023; 11:00 | Report | Cuba | 17–**18** (PSO) | **Argentina** | Aquatic Center, Santiago; Referees: Danielle Dabbaghian (USA); Reynel Castillo (PUR) |
| 1 November 2023; 11:00 | Report | Score by quarters: **5**–2, 3–3, 3–3, 1–**4** PSO: 5–**6** | | | Aquatic Center, Santiago; Referees: Danielle Dabbaghian (USA); Reynel Castillo (PUR) |
| 1 November 2023; 11:00 | Report | Zunzunegui 4 | **Goals** | A. Bacigalupo 6 | Aquatic Center, Santiago; Referees: Danielle Dabbaghian (USA); Reynel Castillo (PUR) |

== Weightlifting ==
Cuba qualified six weightlifters (three men and three women).

| Athlete | Event | Snatch | | Clean & Jerk | | Total | Rank |
| Athlete | Event | Result | Rank | Result | Rank | Total | Rank |

== Wrestling ==
Cuba qualified 18 wrestlers (12 men and 6 women) through the 2022 Pan American Wrestling Championships and the 2023 Pan American Wrestling Championships.

Key:

- VT – Victory by fall.
- PP – Decision by points – the loser with technical points.
- PO – Decision by points – the loser without technical points.
- SP – Technical superiority – the loser with technical points and a margin of victory of at least 9 (Greco-Roman) or 10 (freestyle) points.
- ST – Great superiority – the loser without technical points and a margin of victory of at least 8 (Greco-Roman) or 10 (freestyle) points.
- VA – Decision by withdrawal

Men

| Athlete | Event | Quarterfinal | Semifinal | Final / BM | |
| Athlete | Event | Opposition Result | Opposition Result | Opposition Result | Rank |
|---|---|---|---|---|---|
| | Freestyle 57 kg | | | | |
| | Freestyle 65 kg | | | | |
| | Freestyle 74 kg | | | | |
| | Freestyle 86 kg | | | | |
| | Freestyle 97 kg | | | | |
| | Freestyle 125 kg | | | | |
| | Greco-Roman 60 kg | | | | |
| | Greco-Roman 67 kg | | | | |
| | Greco-Roman 77 kg | | | | |
| | Greco-Roman 87 kg | | | | |
| | Greco-Roman 97 kg | | | | |
| | Greco-Roman 130 kg | | | | |

Women

| Athlete | Event | Quarterfinal | Semifinal | Final / BM | |
| Athlete | Event | Opposition Result | Opposition Result | Opposition Result | Rank |
|---|---|---|---|---|---|
| | 50 kg | | | | |
| | 53 kg | | | | |
| | 57 kg | | | | |
| | 62 kg | | | | |
| | 68 kg | | | | |
| | 76 kg | | | | |

== See also ==
- Cuba at the 2024 Summer Olympics
