= Rowing at the 2026 South American Games =

Rowing competitions at the 2026 South American Games

- Venue: Costanera Este (rowing); Club de Niños Manuel Belgrano (coastal rowing)
- Dates: September 15–23
- Competitors: 151 from 8 nations

Rowing competitions at the 2026 South American Games in Rosario, Santa Fe, and Rafaela, Argentina, were held between September 15 and 23. Rowing and coastal rowing events will take place at Costanera Este and Club de Niños Manuel Belgrano, respectively; both venues are located within Laguna Setúbal in Santa Fe.

A total of 22 events were contested (ten men's, ten women's and two mixed). Five coastal rowing events were added. Due to bad weather, most coastal rowing events were not held as scheduled. All but the women's double sculls could only contest the time trials, with the following quarterfinals, semifinals and finals being cancelled. For these events, the results during the time trials were used for the medal placements.

== Medal summary ==
=== Medal table ===
* Host nation (Argentina)

Rank	Nation	Gold	Silver	Bronze	Total
1	Chile	7	5	3	15
2	Uruguay	7	3	5	15
3	Brazil	4	4	5	13
4	Peru	2	3	1	6
5	Argentina*	1	3	6	10
6	Paraguay	1	3	3	7
7	Venezuela	0	1	0	1
Totals (7 entries)		22	22	23	67

=== Medalists ===
==== Coastal rowing ====
Event	Gold		Silver		Bronze	
Men's solo	David Faria; Brazil	2:22.66	Álvaro Torres; Peru	2:28.21	Brahim Alvayay; Chile	2:29.41
Men's double sculls	David Faria; Yan Costa; Brazil	2:12.24	Marcos Sarraute; Martín Zócalo; Uruguay	2:14.92	Brahim Alvayay; Rafael Aravena; Chile	2:15.05
Women's solo	Pamela Noya; Peru	3:13.17	Fiorela Rodríguez; Paraguay	3:47.65	Clara Galfre; Argentina	3:12.71
Women's solo	Pamela Noya; Peru	3:13.17	Fiorela Rodríguez; Paraguay	3:47.65	Ana Freire; Brazil	3:27.96
Women's double sculls	Romina Cetraro; Zoe Acosta; Uruguay	2:38.84	Pamela Noya; Adriana Sanguineti; Peru	2:39.13	Fernanda Ferreira; Ana Freire; Brazil	2:41.81
Mixed doubles sculls	Kissya Cataldo; Vangelys Reinke; Brazil	2:22.39	Johann Hamann; Pamela Noya; Peru	2:24.92	Katia Baluzzo; Santiago Ferrer; Argentina	2:25.13

==== Rowing ====
Men's

Event	Gold		Silver		Bronze	
Single sculls	Bruno Cetraro; Uruguay	6:32.83	Andoni Habash; Chile	6:33.69	Agustín Scenna; Argentina	6:42.78
Double sculls	Alfredo Abraham; Andoni Habash; Chile	5:58.39	Bruno Cetraro; Felipe Klüver; Uruguay	6:02.49	Bernardo Barreto; Breno De Ornellas; Brazil	6:09.92
Quadruple sculls	Bruno Cetraro; Martín González; Felipe Klüver; Leandro Salvagno; Uruguay	5:31.05	Alfredo Abraham; Francisco Lapostol; Ignacio Abraham; César Abaroa; Chile	5:33.61	Santino Menin; Emiliano Calderon; Ignacio Pacheco; Agustin Scenna; Argentina	5:35.54
Eight	Leandro Rodas; Leandro Salvagno; Bruno Cetraro; Eric Seawright; Marcos Sarraute; Luciano García; Felipe Klüver; Martin Zocalo; Romina Cetraro; Uruguay	5:23.31	Fernando Álvarez; Martin Mansilla; Emiliano Calderon; Joaquin Riveros; Maximo Pacheco; Agustin Annese; Joel Romero; Ignacio Pacheco; Anika Fucile; Argentina	5:25.58	Nahuel Reyes; Francisco Lapostol; Alfredo Abraham; Ignacio Wilson; Andoni Habash; Ignacio Abraham; César Abaroa; Marcelo Poo; Facundo Pedraza; Chile	5:26.14
Coxless pair	César Abaroa; Marcelo Poo; Chile	6:19.15	Leandro Rodas; Luciano García; Uruguay	6:20.26	Agustin Annese; Fernando Álvarez; Argentina	6:32.10
Coxless four	Luciano García; Leandro Rodas; Martín Sarraute; Martín Zocalo; Uruguay	5:39.15	César Abaroa; Marcelo Poo; Ignacio Abraham; Nahuel Reyes; Chile	5:41.08	Martín Mansilla; Máximo Pacheco; Joaquín Riveros; Joel Romero; Argentina	5:54.66
Lightweight single sculls	Felipe Klüver; Uruguay	7:09.73	Santino Menin; Argentina	7:10.85	Evaldo Becker; Brazil	7:22.18
Lightweight double sculls	Rodrigo Enríquez; Santino Menin; Argentina	6:19.78	José Guipe; César Amaris; Venezuela	6:24.07	Emanuel González; Mauricio López; Uruguay	6:26.21

Women's

Event	Gold		Silver		Bronze	
Single sculls	Nicole Martínez; Paraguay	7:03.08	Beatriz Tavares; Brazil	7:13.34	Nicole Yarzon; Uruguay	7:17.66
Double sculls	Beatriz Tavares; Jennifer Almeida; Brazil	6:45.36	Christina Hostetter; Victoria Hostetter; Chile	6:46.37	Nicole Martínez; Alejandra Alonso; Paraguay	6:45.56
Quadruple sculls	Antonia Abraham; Melita Abraham; Christina Hostetter; Victoria Hostetter; Chile	6:12.54	Isabelle Falck; Jennifer Almeida; Lara Pizarro; Yanka De Britto; Brazil	6:14.05	Pamela Noya; Alessia Palacios; Valeria Palacios; Adriana Sanguineti; Peru	6:14.05
Eight	Antonia Abraham; Melita Abraham; Christina Hostetter; Victoria Hostetter; Antonia Liewald; Isidora Niemeyer; Josefa Yáñez; Emily Serandour; Josefa Ceballos; Chile	5:53.08	Beatriz Tavares; Dayane Pacheco; Isabelle Falck; Jennifer Almeida; Lorrayne Melo; Lara Pizarro; Mariana Macedo; Yanka De Britto; Eirck Oliveira; Brazil	5:57.26	Agustina López; Rocío Bordón; Fiorela Rodríguez; Bianca Wollmeister; Nicole Martínez; Clara Correa; Adriana Sanabria; Martina Noguera; Alejandra Alonso; Paraguay	6:08.77
Coxless pair	Antonia Abraham; Melita Abraham; Chile	7:12.64	Alejandra Alonso; Nicole Martinez; Paraguay	7:19.28	Ynela Aires; Zoe Acosta; Uruguay	7:23.63
Coxless four	Emily Serandour; Isidora Niemeyer; Melita Abraham; Antonia Abraham; Chile	6:26.81	Katia Baluzzo; Elena Cerrudo; Catalina Deandrea; Iara Simonitti; Argentina	6:30.97	Fiorela Rodríguez; Agustina López; Alejandra Alonso; Nicole Martínez; Paraguay	6:31.78
Lightweight single sculls	Antonia Liewald; Chile	7:33.78	Isabelle Falck; Brazil	7:43.36	Nicole Yarzon; Uruguay	7:44.72
Lightweight double sculls	Alessia Palacios; Valeria Palacios; Peru	6:57.15	Rocío Bordón; Adriana Sanabria; Paraguay	7:19.28	Romina Cetraro; Tatiana Seijas; Uruguay	7:23.63

Mixed

Event	Gold		Silver		Bronze	
Eight	Leandro Rodas; Tatiana Seijas; Ynela Aires; Zoe Acosta; Lucia Arrieta; Luciano García; Marcos Sarraute; Martin Zocalo; Romina Cetraro; Uruguay	5:35.01	Christina Hostetter; Victoria Hostetter; Nahuel Reyes; Ignacio Wilson; Andoni Habash; Marcelo Poo; Antonia Abraham; Melita Abraham; Josefa Ceballos; Chile	5:36.77	Dayane Pacheco; Mariana Macedo; Lorrayne Melo; Pedro Henrique Ferreira; Matheus Freitas; Lucas Verthein; Gabriel Campos; Beatriz Tavares; Erick Oliveira; Brazil	5:41.08

== Participation ==
Eight nations participated in the rowing events of the 2026 South American Games.

- Argentina (27)
- Bolivia (4)
- Brazil (27)
- Chile (26)
- Paraguay (22)
- Peru (12)
- Uruguay (17)
- Venezuela (16)

== Results ==
=== Men's solo ===
Rank	Name	Nation	Time
1st place, gold medalist(s)	David Faria	Brazil	2:22.66
2nd place, silver medalist(s)	Álvaro Torres	Peru	2:28.21
3rd place, bronze medalist(s)	Brahim Alvayay	Chile	2:29.41
4	Santiago Ferrer	Argentina	2:36.11
5	Valentino Balzarini	Paraguay	2:39.35
6	Mauricio López	Uruguay	2:40.53
7	José Guipe	Venezuela	2:48.65
8	Jheison Ovidio	Bolivia	3:07.50

=== Men's double sculls ===
Rank	Name	Nation	Time
1st place, gold medalist(s)	David Faria; Yan Costa	Brazil	2:12.24
2nd place, silver medalist(s)	Marcos Sarraute; MartíN Zócalo	Uruguay	2:14.92
3rd place, bronze medalist(s)	Brahim Alvayay; Rafael Aravena	Chile	2:15.05
4	Álvaro Torres; Johann Hamann	Peru	2:16.06
5	José Guipe; Jakson Vicent	Venezuela	2:25.84
6	Agustín Scenna; Santino Menín	Argentina	2:30.06
7	Alberto Portillo; Juan Iglesias	Paraguay	2:30.37
8	Jheison Ovidio; Brayan Peredo	Bolivia	2:42.60

=== Women's solo ===
Rank	Athlete	Nation	Time trial		Quarterfinals			Semifinals			Final
Rank	Athlete	Nation	Time	Rank	Heat	Time	Notes	Heat	Time	Notes	Final
1st place, gold medalist(s)	Pamela Noya	Peru	2:56.64	6	4	3:17.50	Q	2	3:15.61	Gold medal final	3:13.17
2nd place, silver medalist(s)	Fiorela Rodríguez	Paraguay	2:53.77	5	2	3:48.36	Q	1	3:15.68	Gold medal final	3:47.65
3rd place, bronze medalist(s)	Clara Galfre	Argentina	2:50.47	1	1	3:58.92	Q	1	3:26.32	Bronze medal final	3:12.71
3rd place, bronze medalist(s)	Ana Freire	Brazil	2:51.67	2	3	3:34.35	Q	2	3:53.70	Bronze medal final	3:27.96
=5	Josefa Vila	Chile	2:52.33	3	4	3:53.99		Did not advance			
=5	Tatiana Seijas	Uruguay	2:53.19	4	2	4:10.71		Did not advance			
=7	Kimberlin Meneses	Venezuela	3:18.01	7	3	5:36.52		Did not advance			
=7	Tatiana Gandarillas	Bolivia	3:45.47	8	1	DNF		Did not advance			

=== Women's double sculls ===
Rank	Name	Nation	Time
1st place, gold medalist(s)	Romina Cetraro; Zoe Acosta	Uruguay	2:38.84
2nd place, silver medalist(s)	Pamela Noya; Adriana Sanguineti	Peru	2:39.13
3rd place, bronze medalist(s)	Fernanda Ferreira; Ana Freire	Brazil	2:41.81
4	Clara Galfre; Evelyn Silvestro	Argentina	2:43.06
5	Florencia Mathias; Josefa Vila	Chile	2:45.03
6	Clara Correa; Adriana Sanabria	Paraguay	2:51.06
7	Keyla García; Kimberlin Meneses	Venezuela	3:11.54
8	Jhovana Mollinedo; Tatiana Gandarillas	Bolivia	3:38.86

=== Mixed doubles sculls ===
Rank	Name	Nation	Time
1st place, gold medalist(s)	Kissya Cataldo; Vangelys Reinke	Brazil	2:22.39
2nd place, silver medalist(s)	Johann Hamann; Pamela Noya	Peru	2:24.92
3rd place, bronze medalist(s)	Katia Baluzzo; Santiago Ferrer	Argentina	2:25.13
4	Christina Hostetter; Rafael Aravena	Chile	2:28.83
5	Fiorela Rodríguez; Valentino Balzarini	Paraguay	2:32.02
6	Keyla García; Jakson Vicent	Venezuela	2:32.49
7	Mauricio López; Tatiana Seijas	Uruguay	2:40.90
8	Jheison Ovidio; Tatiana Gandarillas	Bolivia	2:56.83

=== Men's single sculls ===
Rank	Name	Nation	Time
1st place, gold medalist(s)	Bruno Cetraro	Uruguay	6:32.83
2nd place, silver medalist(s)	Andoni Habash	Chile	6:33.69
3rd place, bronze medalist(s)	Agustín Scenna	Argentina	6:42.78
4	Lucas Verthein	Brazil	6:57.19
5	Nick Utrera	Venezuela	7:17.07

=== Men's double sculls ===
Rank	Name	Nation	Time
1st place, gold medalist(s)	Alfredo Abraham; Andoni Habash	Chile	5:58.39
2nd place, silver medalist(s)	Bruno Cetraro; Felipe Klüver	Uruguay	6:02.49
3rd place, bronze medalist(s)	Breno de Ornellas; Bernardo Barreto	Brazil	6:09.92
4	Emiliano Calderón; Ignacio Pacheco	Argentina	6:20.44
5	Jonas Díaz; Nick Utrera	Venezuela	6:28.02
6	Valentino Balzarini; Gustavo Avalos	Paraguay	6:47.76

=== Men's quadruple sculls ===
Rank	Name	Nation	Time
1st place, gold medalist(s)	Bruno Cetraro; Martín González; Felipe Klüver; Leandro Salvagno	Uruguay	5:31.05
2nd place, silver medalist(s)	Alfredo Abraham; Ignacio Abraham; Francisco Lapostol; César Abaroa	Chile	5:33.61
3rd place, bronze medalist(s)	Agustín Scenna; Emiliano Calderón; Ignacio Pacheco; Santino Menin	Argentina	5:35.54
4	Breno de Ornellas; Bernardo Barreto; Olavo Pelegrino; Piedro Tuchtenhagen	Brazil	5:46.70
5	Jonas Díaz; César Amaris; Nick Utrera; Jakson Vicent	Venezuela	5:53.68
6	Valentino Balzarini; Bruno Raimondo; Alejandro Camacho; Gustavo Avalos	Paraguay	5:55.61

=== Men's eight ===
Rank	Name	Nation	Time
1st place, gold medalist(s)	Bruno Cetraro; Martín Zócalo; Felipe Klüver; Leandro Salvagno; Eric Seawright; Luciano García; Leandro Rodas; Marcos Sarraute; Romina Cetraro	Uruguay	5:23.31
2nd place, silver medalist(s)	Agustín Anesse; Emiliano Calderón; Ignacio Pacheco; Fernando Álvarez; Martín Mansilla; Máximo Pacheco; Joaquín Riveros; Joel Romero; Anika Fucile	Argentina	5:25.58
3rd place, bronze medalist(s)	Alfredo Abraham; Ignacio Abraham; Francisco Lapostol; César Abaroa; Andoni Habash; Facundo Pedraza; Marcelo Poo; Nahuel Reyes; Ignacio Wilson	Chile	5:26.14
4	Breno de Ornellas; Bernardo Barreto; Olavo Pelegrino; Bernardo Boggian; Erick Oliveira; Gabriel Campos; Lucas Verthein; Matheus Freitas; Pedro Ferreira	Brazil	5:36.91
5	Eduardo Vázquez; Bruno Raimondo; Alejandro Camacho; Gustavo Avalos; Nicolás Villalba; Gabriel Yser; Nicolás Invernizzi; Giuliano Franchella; Martina Noguera	Paraguay	5:47.85
6	Jonas Díaz; César Amaris; Nick Utrera; Jakson Vicent; José Guipe; Yoikelmar Monasterio; André Mora; Jaime Machado; Keila García	Venezuela	5:48.59

=== Men's coxless pair ===
Rank	Athlete	Nation	Heats				Repechage			Final
Rank	Athlete	Nation	Heat	Time	Rank	Notes	Time	Rank	Notes	Final
1st place, gold medalist(s)	César Abaroa; Marcelo Poo	Chile	1	6:27.54	1	F	—N/a			6:19.15
2nd place, silver medalist(s)	Leandro Rodas; Luciano García	Uruguay	2	6:31.11	1	F	—N/a			6:20.26
3rd place, bronze medalist(s)	Agustín Annese; Fernando Álvarez	Argentina	2	6:33.74	3	R	6:51.79	3	F	6:32.10
4	Jaime Machado; Andre Mora	Venezuela	2	6:33.55	2	R	6:51.58	2	F	6:41.38
5	Gabriel Campos; Pedro Ferreira	Brazil	1	6:44.16	2	R	6:47.59	2	F	6:42.02
6	Nicolás Villalba; Nicolás Invernizzi	Paraguay	1	6:50.06	3	R	6:58.44	4	F	6:50.47
7	Sebastián Ludeña; Renzo Ramírez	Peru	1	6:50.49	4	R	7:10.30	5		Did not advance

=== Men's coxless four ===
Rank	Name	Nation	Time
1st place, gold medalist(s)	Luciano García; Leandro Rodas; Marcos Sarraute; Martín Zocalo	Uruguay	5:39.15
2nd place, silver medalist(s)	César Abaroa; Marcelo Poo; Ignacio Abraham; Nahuel Reyes	Chile	5:41.08
3rd place, bronze medalist(s)	Martín Mansilla; Máximo Pacheco; Joaquín Riveros; Joel Romero	Argentina	5:54.66
4	Bernardo Boggian; Gabriel Campos; Matheus Freitas; Pedro Ferreira	Brazil	6:06.77
5	Gabriel Yser; Ncolás Villalba; Nicolás Invernizzi; Eduardo Vázquez	Paraguay	6:32.06

=== Men's lightweight single sculls ===
Rank	Athlete	Nation	Heats				Repechage			Final
Rank	Athlete	Nation	Heat	Time	Rank	Notes	Time	Rank	Notes	Final
1st place, gold medalist(s)	Felipe Klüver	Uruguay	1	7:11.73	1	F	—N/a			7:09.73
2nd place, silver medalist(s)	Santiago Menin	Argentina	2	7:05.38	1	F	—N/a			7:10.85
3rd place, bronze medalist(s)	Evaldo Becker	Brazil	2	7:24.76	4	R	7:02.63	1	F	7:22.18
4	César Cipriani	Peru	2	7:18.39	3	R	7:16.63	4	F	7:24.46
5	Juan Pablo Peña	Chile	1	7:13.93	2	R	7:08.25	2	F	7:30.18
6	Matías Ramírez	Paraguay	1	7:41.66	3	R	7:11.94	3	F	7:36.88
7	José Guipe	Venezuela	2	7:15.06	2	R	7:32.05	5		Did not advance
8	Jheison Orozco	Bolivia	1	7:42.24	4	R	7:45.95	6		Did not advance

=== Men's lightweight double sculls ===
Rank	Athlete	Nation	Heats				Repechage			Final
Rank	Athlete	Nation	Heat	Time	Rank	Notes	Time	Rank	Notes	Final
1st place, gold medalist(s)	Rodrigo Enríquez; Santiago Menin	Argentina	2	6:15.72	1	F	—N/a			6:19.78
2nd place, silver medalist(s)	José Guipe; César Amaris	Venezuela	1	6:29.75	2	R	6:27.68	3	F	6:24.07
3rd place, bronze medalist(s)	Emanuel González; Mauricio López	Uruguay	2	6:18.84	3	R	6:19.78	2	F	6:26.21
4	Evaldo Becker; Piedro Tuchtenhagen	Brazil	1	6:24.98	1	F	—N/a			6:32.63
5	Manuel Fernández; Guillermo Muller	Chile	2	6:18.14	2	R	6:16.27	1	F	6:48.00
6	Gabriel Yser; Gonzalo Ruiz	Paraguay	2	6:40.42	4	R	6:32.22	4	F	7:14.62
7	Juan Pablo Poma; Santiago Moya	Peru	1	6:43.34	3	R	6:37.01	5		Did not advance
8	Jheison Orozco; Brayan Peredo	Bolivia	1	7:12.59	4	R	DNS			Did not advance

=== Women's single sculls ===
Rank	Name	Nation	Time
1st place, gold medalist(s)	Nicole Martínez	Paraguay	7:03.08
2nd place, silver medalist(s)	Beatriz Tavares	Brazil	7:13.34
3rd place, bronze medalist(s)	Nicole Yarzon	Uruguay	7:17.66
4	Isidora Niemeyer	Chile	7:22.83
5	Elena Cerrudo	Argentina	7:29.38
6	Zairet Rolls	Venezuela	8:00.55

=== Women's double sculls ===
Rank	Name	Nation	Time
1st place, gold medalist(s)	Beatriz Tavares; Jennifer Almeida	Brazil	6:45.36
2nd place, silver medalist(s)	Christina Hostetter; Victoria Hostetter	Chile	6:46.37
3rd place, bronze medalist(s)	Nicole Martínez; Alejandra Alonso	Paraguay	6:54.56
4	Keila García; Francis Chacín	Venezuela	7:06.69
5	Florencia Duarte; Delfina Orlandini	Argentina	7:12.09

=== Women's quadruple sculls ===
Rank	Name	Nation	Time
1st place, gold medalist(s)	Antonia Abraham; Melita Abraham; Christina Hostetter; Victoria Hostetter	Chile	6:12.54
2nd place, silver medalist(s)	Isabelle Falck; Jennifer Almeida; Lara Pizarro; Yanka de Britto	Brazil	6:14.05
3rd place, bronze medalist(s)	Pamela Noya; Alessia Palacios; Valeria Palacios; Adriana Sanguineti	Peru	6:17.25
4	Catalina Deandrea; Florencia Duarte; Clara Galfre; Delfina Orlandini	Argentina	6:18.54
5	Adriana Sanabria; Alejandra Alonso; Agustina López; Fiorela Rodríguez	Paraguay	6:26.23
6	Keila García; Jenesis Pérez; Francis Chacín; Kimberlin Meneses	Venezuela	6:39.92

=== Women's eight ===
Rank	Name	Nation	Time
1st place, gold medalist(s)	Antonia Abraham; Melita Abraham; Christina Hostetter; Victoria Hostetter; Antonia Liewald; Isidora Niemeyer; Josefa Yánez; Emily Serandour; Josefa Ceballos	Chile	5:53.08
2nd place, silver medalist(s)	Isabelle Falck; Jennifer Almeida; Lara Pizarro; Yanka de Britto; Beatriz Tavares; Dayane Pacheco; Erick Oliveira; Lorrayne Melo; Mariana Macedo	Brazil	5:57.26
3rd place, bronze medalist(s)	Adriana Sanabria; Alejandra Alonso; Agustina López; Fiorela Rodríguez; Rocío Bordón; Bianca Wollmeister; Clara Correa; Nicole Martínez; Martina Noguera	Paraguay	6:08.77
4	Catalina Deandrea; Florencia Duarte; Clara Galfre; Elena Cerrudo; Agostina Manzotti; Guadalupe Salas; Evelyn Silvestro; Iara Simonitti; Francesca Arango	Argentina	6:23.21

=== Women's coxless pair ===
Rank	Name	Nation	Time
1st place, gold medalist(s)	Antonia Abraham; Melita Abraham	Chile	7:12.64
2nd place, silver medalist(s)	Nicole Martínez; Alejandra Alonso	Paraguay	7:19.28
3rd place, bronze medalist(s)	Ynela Aires; Zoe Acosta	Uruguay	7:23.63
4	Lorrayne Melo; Mariana Macedo	Brazil	7:31.17
5	Katia Baluzzo; Iara Simonitti	Argentina	7:33.42
6	Naomi Soazo; Yendris Vásquez	Venezuela	8:19.04

=== Women's coxless four ===
Rank	Name	Nation	Time
1st place, gold medalist(s)	Antonia Abraham; Melita Abraham; Isidora Niemeyer; Emily Serandour	Chile	6:26.81
2nd place, silver medalist(s)	Katia Baluzzo; Iara Simonitti; Elena Cerrudo; Catalina Deandrea	Argentina	6:30.97
3rd place, bronze medalist(s)	Nicole Martínez; Alejandra Alonso; Fiorela Rodríguez; Agustina López	Paraguay	6:31.78
4	Lorrayne Melo; Mariana Macedo; Ana Julia Ferreira; Dayane Pacheco	Brazil	6:32.53
5	Ynela Aires; Zoe Acosta; Tatiana Seijas; Lucía Arrieta	Uruguay	6:36.47

=== Women's lightweight single sculls ===
Rank	Athlete	Nation	Heats				Repechage			Final
Rank	Athlete	Nation	Heat	Time	Rank	Notes	Time	Rank	Notes	Final
1st place, gold medalist(s)	Antonia Lieward	Chile	1	7:43.30	1	F	—N/a			7:33.78
2nd place, silver medalist(s)	Isabelle Falck	Brazil	2	7:43.88	4	R	7:49.84	2	F	7:43.36
3rd place, bronze medalist(s)	Nicole Yarzon	Uruguay	2	7:24.33	1	F	—N/a			7:44.72
4	Clara Galfre	Argentina	2	7:33.89	3	R	7:52.89	3	F	7:48.64
5	Rocío Bordon	Paraguay	1	7:54.02	2	R	7:58.78	4	F	7:52.53
6	Valeria Palacios	Peru	2	7:29.92	2	R	7:42.82	1	F	7:59.79
7	Kimberlin Meneses	Venezuela	1	8:10.00	3	R	8:11.30	5		Did not advance
8	Tatiana Gandarillas	Bolivia	1	9:11.55	4	R	9:18.64	6		Did not advance

=== Women's lightweight double sculls ===
Rank	Athlete	Nation	Heats				Repechage (Note: While initially expected to be held on September 15, the repechage was cancelled and the six best times during the heats advanced directly to the final.)			Final
Rank	Athlete	Nation	Heat	Time	Rank	Notes	Time	Rank	Notes	Final
1st place, gold medalist(s)	Alessia Palacios; Valeria Palacios	Peru	1	6:54.33	1	F	—N/a			6:57.15
2nd place, silver medalist(s)	Rocío Bordon; Adriana Sanabria	Paraguay	1	7:04.41	2	R	—N/a			7:03.52
3rd place, bronze medalist(s)	Romina Cetraro; Tatiana Seijas	Uruguay	1	7:07.54	4	R	—N/a			7:05.65
4	Anika Fucile; Carola Molina	Argentina	1	7:07.23	3	R	—N/a			7:09.47
5	Sofía Zúñiga; Josefa Yáñez	Chile	2	7:04.57	1	F	—N/a			7:09.58
6	Keila García; Kimberlin Meneses	Venezuela	2	7:18.86	2	R	—N/a			7:26.13
7	Jhovana Mollinedo; Tatiana Gandarillas	Bolivia	2	8:32.52	3	R	—N/a			Did not advance

=== Mixed eight ===
Rank	Name	Nation	Time
1st place, gold medalist(s)	Martín Zócalo; Luciano García; Leandro Rodas; Marcos Sarraute; Romina Cetraro; Ynela Aires; Lucía Arrieta; Tatiana Seijas; Zoe Acosta	Uruguay	5:35.01
2nd place, silver medalist(s)	Andoni Habash; Marcelo Poo; Nahuel Reyes; Ignacio Wilson; Antonia Abraham; Melita Abraham; Christina Hostetter; Victoria Hostetter; Josefa Ceballos	Chile	5:36.77
3rd place, bronze medalist(s)	Erick Oliveira; Gabriel Campos; Lucas Verthein; Matheus Freitas; Pedro Ferreira; Beatriz Tavares; Dayane Pacheco; Lorrayne Melo; Mariana Macedo	Brazil	5:41.08
4	Catalina Deandrea; Agostina Manzotti; Evelyn Silvestro; Agustín Anesse; Martín Mansilla; Máximo Pacheco; Valentino Aversso; Victoria Riveros	Argentina	5:48.70
5	Eduardo Vázquez; Nicolás Villalba; Gabriel Yser; Nicolás Invernizzi; Martina Noguera; Alejandra Alonso; Agustina López; Fiorela Rodríguez; Nicole Martínez	Paraguay	5:58.02
6	Jonas Díaz; César Amaris; Francis Chacín; Zairet Rolls; Naomi Soazo; Yendris Vásquez; André Mora; Jaime Machado; Keila García	Venezuela	6:09.42
