= Rowing at the 2022 South American Games =

Rowing competitions at the 2022 South American Games

- Venue: Bahía de Asunción - Club Mbiguá
- Dates: October 2−5
- Nations: 8

Rowing competitions at the 2022 South American Games in Asunción, Paraguay were held between October 2 and 5, 2022 at the Bahía de Asunción - Club Mbiguá

== Schedule ==
H	Heats	R	Repechage	F	Final

The competition schedule is as follows:

Men
Date Event	Sun 2		Mon 3	Tue 4	Wed 5
M1x	H	R			F
M2x			F		
M4x				F	
M2−			F		
M4−	H	R		F	
LM2x				F	
LM4−					F
M8+					F

Women
Date Event	Sun 2	Mon 3	Tue 4	Wed 5
W1x				F
W2x			F	
W4x		F		
W2−		F		
LW1x		F		
LW2x			F	

== Medal summary ==
=== Medal table ===
* Host nation (Paraguay)

Rank	Nation	Gold	Silver	Bronze	Total
1	Uruguay	6	2	2	10
2	Chile	6	1	4	11
3	Argentina	1	5	2	8
4	Paraguay*	1	3	2	6
5	Brazil	0	3	3	6
6	Peru	0	0	1	1
Totals (6 entries)		14	14	14	42

=== Medalists ===
==== Men ====
Event	Gold		Silver		Bronze	
M1x	Bruno Cetraro; Uruguay	6:56.85	Javier Insfran; Paraguay	7:00.33	Lucas Verthein; Brazil	7:04.14
M2x	Bruno Cetraro; Felipe Klüver; Uruguay	6:20.81	Axel Haack; Augusin Matias; Argentina	6:23.90	Javier Insfran; Arturo Rivarola; Paraguay	6:24.01
M4x	Bruno Cetraro; Felipe Klüver; Leandro Salvagno Rattaro; Marcos Sarraute; Uruguay	5:52.52	Agustín Scenna; Axel Haack; Emiliano Calderon; Santiago Deandrea; Argentina	5:55.23	Andoni Habash; Nahuel Reyes; Óscar Vásquez; Pedro Canales; Chile	6:00.62
M2−	Martin Zocalo; Leandro Rodas; Uruguay	6:36.40	Ignacio Abraham; Cristopher Kalleg; Chile	6:40.94	Franco Calvo; Lautaro Nahuel; Argentina	6:44.01
M4−	Alfredo Abrahan; Marcelo Poo; Ignacio Abraham; Cristopher Kalleg; Chile	5:59.14	Newton Seawright; Martin Zocalo; Luciano García; Leandro Rodas; Uruguay	6:02.33	Lautaro Nahuel; Ignacio Daniel; Franco Calvo; Joel Ajejandro; Argentina	6:06.38
LM2x	Felipe Klüver; Bruno Cetraro; Uruguay	6:24.91	Pedro Kirk; Alejandro Matías; Argentina	6:27.36	Piedro Tuchtenhagen; João Batista; Brazil	6:31.95
LM4−	Eber Sanhueza; Roberto Liewald; Manuel Fernández; Felipe Cárdenas; Chile	6:05.73	Diego Nazário; Emanuel Borges; Vangelys Pereira; David Souza; Brazil	6:05.84	Mauricio López; Joaquín Vázquez; Joaquin Duarte; Felipe Klüver; Uruguay	6:13.66
M8+	Felipe Klüver; Martin Zocalo; Mauricio López; Newton Seawright; Leandro Rodas; Leandro Salvagno Rattaro; Luciano García; Marcos Sarraute; Romina Cetraro; Uruguay	5:41.88	Augusin Matias; Alejandro Matías; Axel Haack; Franco Calvo; Pedro Kirk; Joel Ajejandro; Lautaro Nahuel; Ignacio Daniel; Clara Galfre; Argentina	5:45.75	Brahin Alvalay; Andoni Habash; Cristopher Kalleg; Óscar Vásquez; Francisco Lapostol; Nahuel Reyes; Ignacio Abraham; Marcelo Poo; Isidora Soto; Chile	5:48.55

==== Women ====
Event	Gold		Silver		Bronze	
W1x	Alejandra Alonso; Paraguay	7:42.33	Beatriz Cardoso; Brazil	7:44.66	Antonia Abraham; Chile	7:58.87
W2x	Victoria Hostetter; Melita Abraham; Chile	7:00.92	Nicole Martinez; Alejandra Alonso; Paraguay	7:08.84	Milena Viana; Chloe Delazeri; Brazil	7:16.39
W4x	Antonia Abraham; Melita Abraham; Victoria Hostetter; Christina Hostetter; Chile	6:28.91	Chloe Delazeri; Dayane Santos; Milena Viana; Nathalia Barbosa; Brazil	6:40.68	Adriana Sanguineti; Pamela Noya; Valeria Palacios; Alessia Palacios; Peru	6:40.85
W2−	Antonia Abraham; Melita Abraham; Chile	7:17.50	Alejandra Alonso; Nicole Martinez; Paraguay	7:28.71	Yuliana Etchebarne; Zoe Acosta; Uruguay	7:36.75
LW1x	Isidora Niemeyer; Chile	7:49.49	Sonia Baluzzo; Argentina	7:51.71	Gabriela Mosqueira; Paraguay	7:55.36
LW2x	Sonia Baluzzo; Evelyn Silvestro; Argentina	7:10.62	Tatiana Seijas; Nicole Yarzon; Uruguay	7:13.34	Josefa Vila; Isidora Niemeyer; Chile	7:13.78

== Participation ==
Eight nations participated in rowing events of the 2022 South American Games.

- Argentina
- Bolivia
- Brazil
- Chile
- Paraguay
- Peru
- Uruguay
- Venezuela
