= Rowing at the 2022 Bolivarian Games =

Rowing competitions at the 2022 Bolivarian Games

- Rowing pictogram
- Venue: Ciénaga de Zapatosa
- Dates: 25–27 June 2022
- Competitors: 74 from 7 nations

Champions
- Chile (6 gold medals)

Rowing competitions at the 2022 Bolivarian Games in Valledupar, Colombia were held from 25 to 27 June 2022 at Ciénaga de Zapatosa in Chimichagua, a sub-venue outside Valledupar.

Twelve medal events were scheduled to be contested, six for each men and women. The rowing competitions included the following sculling events for both men and women: singles, lightweight singles, doubles, lightweight doubles, quads and lightweight quads. A total of 74 athletes (40 men and 34 women) will compete in the events. The events were open competitions without age restrictions.

Chile, who were the competition defending champions after Santa Marta 2017, won the rowing competitions again after winning 6 of the 12 gold medals at stake.

== Participating nations ==
A total of 7 nations (4 ODEBO nations and 3 invited) registered athletes for the rowing competitions. Each nation was able to enter one boat per event and a maximum of 16 athletes (8 per gender). The participation of athletes from Ecuador was expected, but finally they were not registered.

- Chile (16 athletes)
- Colombia (1)
- Dominican Republic (5)
- Guatemala (6)
- Paraguay (16)
- Peru (15)
- Venezuela (15)

== Venue ==
The rowing competitions were held at the Ciénaga de Zapatosa, a large marsh located in a depression between the Colombian departments of Cesar and Magdalena. The events took place in the part of the marsh corresponding to the municipality of Chimichagua.

== Medal summary ==
=== Medal table ===
* Host nation (Host nation)

Rank	Nation	Gold	Silver	Bronze	Total
1	Chile	6	5	0	11
2	Paraguay	3	4	4	11
3	Venezuela	2	1	2	5
4	Peru	1	2	6	9
Totals (4 entries)		12	12	12	36

Source: Bolivarianos Valledupar 2022 – Rowing medals

=== Men's events ===
Event	Gold	Silver	Bronze
Single sculls	Javier Insfran; Paraguay	Ignacio Abraham; Chile	Gustavo Salcedo; Peru
Double sculls	Paraguay (PAR); Daniel Acuña; Franco Annicchiarico	Chile (CHI); Brahim Alvayay; Óscar Vásquez	Venezuela (VEN); Ali Leiva; Jaime Machado
Quadruple sculls	Chile (CHI); Brahim Alvayay; Ignacio Abraham; Nahuel Reyes; Óscar Vásquez	Paraguay (PAR); Daniel Acuña; Franco Annicchiarico; Javier Insfran; Nicolás Acuña	Venezuela (VEN); Ali Leiva; Andrés Mora; Argenis Rivero; Jaime Machado
Lightweight single sculls	Felipe Cárdenas; Chile	Jose Guipe; Venezuela	Gerónimo Hamann; Peru
Lightweight double sculls	Venezuela (VEN); Agustín Bentancour; Luis Ollarvez	Paraguay (PAR); Matías Ramírez; Óscar López	Peru (PER); Andrés Sandoval; César Cipriani
Lightweight quadruple sculls	Venezuela (VEN); Agustín Bentancour; Andrés Mora; Jose Guipe; Luis Ollarvez	Chile (CHI); César Abaroa; Eber Sanhueza; Felipe Cárdenas; MatÍas CÁrcamo	Paraguay (PAR); Alberto Yser; Gustavo Sosa; Matías Ramírez; Óscar López

=== Women's events ===
Event	Gold	Silver	Bronze
Single sculls	Antonia Abraham; Chile	Alejandra Alderete; Paraguay	Pamela Noya; Peru
Double sculls	Chile (CHI); Melita Abraham; Victoria Hostetter	Peru (PER); Adriana Sanguineti; Pamela Noya	Paraguay (PAR); Alejandra Alderete; Mariagnes Miranda
Quadruple sculls	Chile (CHI); Antonia Abraham; Melita Abraham; Christina Hostetter; Victoria Hostetter	Paraguay (PAR); Mariagnes Miranda; Alejandra Alderete; Florencia Ruiz; Clara Cardozo	Peru (PER); Alessia Palacios; Pamela Noya; Valeria Palacios; Adriana Sanguineti
Lightweight single sculls	Isidora Niemeyer; Chile	Valeria Palacios; Peru	Gabriela Benítez; Paraguay
Lightweight double sculls	Peru (PER); Alessia Palacios; Valeria Palacios	Chile (CHI); Isidora Niemeyer; Josefa Vila	Paraguay (PAR); Adriana Fretez; Gabriela Benítez
Lightweight quadruple sculls	Paraguay (PAR); Adriana Fretez; Eliana Céspedes; Rocio Díaz; Gabriela Benítez	Chile (CHI); Gabriela Bahamonde; Antonia Llewald; Isidora Niemeyer; Josefa Vila	Peru (PER); Carla Morales; Pamela Noya; Alessia Palacios; Valeria Palacios

=== Mixed quadruple sculls (exhibition event) ===
In addition, a mixed quadruple sculls event was held but did not add any medals to the rowing medal table.

Event	Gold	Silver	Bronze
Mixed quadruple sculls	Chile (CHI); Nahuel Reyes; Brahim Alvayay; Antonia Abraham; Christina Hostetter	Venezuela (VEN); Jaime Machado; Andrés Mora; Naomi Soazo; Keila Garcia	Peru (PER); Luciana Zegarra; Rafaela Sánchez; César Cipriani; Andrés Sandoval
