= Rowing at the 2023 Pan American Games – Women's single sculls =

Women's single sculls at the 2023 Pan American Games
- Venue: Laguna Grande
- Dates: October 21 – October 25
- Competitors: 17 from 15 nations
- Winning time: 7:44.63

Medalists
Gold medal	Kenia Lechuga	Mexico
Silver medal	Beatriz Tavares	Brazil
Bronze medal	Nicole Martinez	Paraguay

The women's single sculls competition of the rowing events at the 2023 Pan American Games was held from October 21 to 25 at Laguna Grande in San Pedro de la Paz, Chile.

== Schedule ==
Date	Time	Round
October 21, 2023	9:30	Heat 1
October 21, 2023	9:40	Heat 2
October 21, 2023	9:50	Heat 3
October 22, 2023	8:20	Repechage 1
October 22, 2023	8:30	Repechage 2
October 24, 2023	8:20	Semifinal A/B 1
October 24, 2023	8:30	Semifinal A/B 2
October 25, 2023	8:00	Final C
October 25, 2023	8:40	Final B
October 25, 2023	9:20	Final A

== Results ==
=== Heats ===
==== Heat 1 ====
Rank	Rowers	Country	Time	Notes
1	Grace Joyce	United States	8:16:05	SA/B
2	Alejandra Alonso	Paraguay	8:26:08	SA/B
3	Antonia Pichott	Chile	8:27:33	R1
4	Ana Jiménez	Cuba	8:47:85	R2
5	Evidelia Gonzalez	Nicaragua	8:49:96	R2

==== Heat 2 ====
Rank	Rowers	Country	Time	Notes
1	Beatriz Tavares	Brazil	8:20:40	SA/B
2	Adriana Sanguineti	Peru	8:36:38	SA/B
3	Jennieffer Zuñiga	Independent Athletes Team	8:51:19	R1
4	Zulay Gil	Colombia	9:13:75	R2
5	María Chaves	Costa Rica	10:37:00	R1

==== Heat 3 ====
Rank	Rowers	Country	Time	Notes
1	Kenia Lechuga	Mexico	8:11:85	SA/B
2	Nicole Martinez	Paraguay	8:19:91	SA/B
3	Cloe Callorda	Uruguay	8:37:55	R2
4	Kimberlin Meneses	Venezuela	8:55:17	R1
5	Adriana Escobar	El Salvador	9:05:92	R2
6	Kerly Salazar	Ecuador	9:33:26	R1

=== Repechage 1 ===
Rank	Rowers	Country	Time	Notes
1	Antonia Pichott	Chile	8:07:69	SA/B
2	Kimberlin Meneses	Venezuela	8:16:95	SA/B
3	Jennieffer Zuñiga	Independent Athletes Team	8:17:63	SA/B
4	Kerly Salazar	Ecuador	9:01:23	FC
5	María Chaves	Costa Rica	DNS	

=== Repechage 2 ===
Rank	Rowers	Country	Time	Notes
1	Cloe Callorda	Uruguay	8:07:73	SA/B
2	Evidelia Gonzalez	Nicaragua	8:16:68	SA/B
3	Ana Jiménez	Cuba	8:19:65	SA/B
4	Adriana Escobar	El Salvador	8:22:52	FC
5	Zulay Gil	Colombia	8:32:52	FC

=== Semifinal A/B 1 ===
Rank	Rowers	Country	Time	Notes
1	Beatriz Tavares	Brazil	7:46.88	FA
2	Nicole Martinez	Paraguay	7:48.34	FA
3	Grace Joyce	United States	7:48.65	FA
4	Cloe Callorda	Uruguay	8:08.33	FB
5	Kimberlin Meneses	Venezuela	8:20.41	FB
6	Ana Jiménez	Cuba	8:32.92	FB

=== Semifinal A/B 2 ===
Rank	Rowers	Country	Time	Notes
1	Kenia Lechuga	Mexico	7:57.63	FA
2	Adriana Sanguineti	Peru	8:04.20	FA
3	Alejandra Alonso	Paraguay	8:07.00	FA
4	Antonia Pichott	Chile	8:09.25	FB
5	Evidelia Gonzalez	Nicaragua	8:18:81	FB
6	Jennieffer Zuñiga	Independent Athletes Team	8:20.83	FB

=== Final C ===
Rank	Rowers	Country	Time	Notes
1	Adriana Escobar	El Salvador	8:36.72	
2	Zulay Gil	Colombia	8:50.45	
3	Kerly Salazar	Ecuador	9:01.17	

=== Final B ===
Rank	Rowers	Country	Time	Notes
1	Cloe Callorda	Uruguay	8:07.70	
2	Antonia Pichott	Chile	8:10.05	
3	Evidelia Gonzalez	Nicaragua	8:20.42	
4	Kimberlin Meneses	Venezuela	8:25.30	
5	Jennieffer Zuñiga	Independent Athletes Team	8:27.42	
6	Ana Jiménez	Cuba	8:40.25	

=== Final A ===
Rank	Rowers	Country	Time	Notes
1st place, gold medalist(s)	Kenia Lechuga	Mexico	7:44.63	
2nd place, silver medalist(s)	Beatriz Tavares	Brazil	7:46.73	
3rd place, bronze medalist(s)	Nicole Martinez	Paraguay	7:47.29	
4	Grace Joyce	United States	7:51.69	
5	Alejandra Alonso	Paraguay	8:06.93	
6	Adriana Sanguineti	Peru	8:11.32	
