= Rowing at the 2023 Pan American Games – Women's lightweight double sculls =

Women's lightweight double sculls at the 2023 Pan American Games
- Venue: Laguna Grande
- Dates: October 22 – October 24
- Competitors: 18 from 9 nations
- Winning time: 7:11.70

Medalists
Gold medal	Antonia Liewald; Isidora Niemeyer	Chile
Silver medal	Elizabeth Martin; Mary Wilson	United States
Bronze medal	Sonia Baluzzo; Evelyn Silvestro	Argentina

The women's lightweight double sculls competition of the rowing events at the 2023 Pan American Games was held from October 22 to 24 at Laguna Grande in San Pedro de la Paz, Chile.

== Schedule ==
Date	Time	Round
October 22, 2023	9:50	Heat 1
October 22, 2023	10:00	Heat 2
October 23, 2023	8:00	Repechage
October 24, 2023	9:20	Final A
October 24, 2023	9:40	Final B

== Results ==
=== Heats ===
==== Heat 1 ====
Rank	Rowers	Country	Time	Notes
1	Antonia Liewald; Isidora Niemeyer	Chile	7:15.42	FA
2	Elizabeth Martin; Mary Wilson	United States	7:17.32	FA
3	Adriana Sanabria; Ricío Bordon	Paraguay	7:21.34	R
4	Alessia Palacios; Valeria Palacios	Peru	7:29.70	R
5	Daniela Altamirano; Melissa Marquez	Mexico	7:32.09	R

==== Heat 2 ====
Rank	Rowers	Country	Time	Notes
1	Sonia Baluzzo; Evelyn Silvestro	Argentina	7:19.55	FA
2	Tatiana Seijas; Nicole Yarzon	Uruguay	7:23.28	FA
3	Antônia Emanuelle Motta; Isabella Ibeas	Brazil	7:26.15	R
4	Lesli Gonzalez; Yulisa Lopez	Independent Athletes Team	7:51.82	R

=== Repechage ===
Rank	Rowers	Country	Time	Notes
1	Adriana Sanabria; Ricío Bordon	Paraguay	7:20.03	FA
2	Alessia Palacios; Valeria Palacios	Peru	7:22.13	FA
3	Daniela Altamirano; Melissa Marquez	Mexico	7:28.70	FB
4	Antônia Emanuelle Motta; Isabella Ibeas	Brazil	7:30.23	FB
5	Lesli Gonzalez; Yulisa Lopez	Independent Athletes Team	7:44.67	FB

=== Final B ===
Rank	Rowers	Country	Time	Notes
7	Antônia Emanuelle Motta; Isabella Ibeas	Brazil	7:30.05	
8	Daniela Altamirano; Melissa Marquez	Mexico	7:32.74	
9	Lesli Gonzalez; Yulisa Lopez	Independent Athletes Team	7:45.68	

=== Final A ===
Rank	Rowers	Country	Time	Notes
1st place, gold medalist(s)	Antonia Liewald; Isidora Niemeyer	Chile	7:11.70	
2nd place, silver medalist(s)	Elizabeth Martin; Mary Wilson	United States	7:14.54	
3rd place, bronze medalist(s)	Sonia Baluzzo; Evelyn Silvestro	Argentina	7:15.27	
4	Adriana Sanabria; Ricío Bordon	Paraguay	7:18.33	
5	Alessia Palacios; Valeria Palacios	Peru	7:21.38	
6	Tatiana Seijas; Nicole Yarzon	Uruguay	7:26.27	
