= Rowing at the 2023 Pan American Games – Men's single sculls =

Men's single sculls at the 2023 Pan American Games
- Venue: Laguna Grande
- Dates: 21–25 October 2023
- Competitors: 17 from 15 nations
- Winning time: 6:58.76

Medalists
Gold medal	Lucas Verthein	Brazil
Silver medal	James Plihal	United States
Bronze medal	Juan José Flores	Mexico

The men's single sculls competition of the rowing events at the 2023 Pan American Games was held from 21 to 25 October 2023 at Laguna Grande in San Pedro de la Paz, Chile.

== Schedule ==
Date	Time	Round
21 October 2023	9:10	Heat 1
21 October 2023	9:20	Heat 2
21 October 2023	9:30	Heat 3
22 October 2023	8:10	Repechage 1
22 October 2023	8:10	Repechage 2
24 October 2023	8:00	Semifinal A/B 1
24 October 2023	8:10	Semifinal A/B 2
25 October 2023	8:10	Final C
25 October 2023	8:50	Final B
25 October 2023	9:30	Final A

== Results ==
=== Heats ===
==== Heat 1 ====
Rank	Rowers	Country	Time	Notes
1	Bruno Cetraro	Uruguay	7:25:89	SA/B
2	Shane Willis	Canada	7:28:37	SA/B
3	Elian Avila	Honduras	7:55:90	R1
4	Gerardo Campa	Independent Athletes Team	8:00:68	R2
5	Kyle Spenard	Barbados	8:30:56	R2

==== Heat 2 ====
Rank	Rowers	Country	Time	Notes
1	Lucas Verthein	Brazil	7:23:12	SA/B
2	Juan José Flores	Mexico	7:31:21	SA/B
3	Jakson Vicent	Venezuela	7:47:85	R1
4	Francisco Romero	Cuba	7:52:86	R2
5	Felix Potoy	Nicaragua	7:54:03	R1
6	Roberto López	El Salvador	7:54:45	R2

==== Heat 3 ====
Rank	Rowers	Country	Time	Notes
1	James Plihal	United States	7:21:53	SA/B
2	Álvaro Torres	Peru	7:26:30	SA/B
3	Javier Insfran	Paraguay	7:36:03	R2
4	Ignacio Vasquez	Dominican Republic	7:37:01	R1
5	Arturo Rivarola	Paraguay	7:47:89	R2
6	Israel Salavarría	Ecuador	8:16:61	R1

=== Repechage 1 ===
Rank	Rowers	Country	Time	Notes
1	Ignacio Vasquez	Dominican Republic	7:24:27	SA/B
2	Jakson Vicent	Venezuela	7:29:04	SA/B
3	Felix Potoy	Nicaragua	7:30:89	SA/B
4	Elian Avila	Honduras	7:33:72	FC
5	Israel Salavarría	Ecuador	7:46:72	FC

=== Repechage 2 ===
Rank	Rowers	Country	Time	Notes
1	Javier Insfran	Paraguay	7:14:56	SA/B
2	Arturo Rivarola	Paraguay	7:16:83	SA/B
3	Roberto López	El Salvador	7:26:74	SA/B
4	Francisco Romero	Cuba	7:27:76	FC
5	Gerardo Campa	Independent Athletes Team	7:39:11	FC
6	Kyle Spenard	Barbados	8:04:30	FC

=== Semifinal A/B 1 ===
Rank	Rowers	Country	Time	Notes
1	Lucas Verthein	Brazil	7:04.07	FA
2	Bruno Cetraro	Uruguay	7:05.33	FA
3	Javier Insfran	Paraguay	7:07.04	FA
4	Álvaro Torres	Peru	7:07.51	FB
5	Jakson Vicent	Venezuela	7:55.24	FB
6	Roberto López	El Salvador	7:59.49	FB

=== Semifinal A/B 2 ===
Rank	Rowers	Country	Time	Notes
1	James Plihal	United States	7:07.41	FA
2	Juan José Flores	Mexico	7:08.24	FA
3	Shane Willis	Canada	7:19.98	FA
4	Ignacio Vasquez	Dominican Republic	7:33.26	FB
5	Felix Potoy	Nicaragua	8:00.03	FB
6	Arturo Rivarola	Paraguay	8:09.87	FB

=== Final C ===
Rank	Rowers	Country	Time	Notes
1	Francisco Romero	Cuba	7:35.74	
2	Elian Avila	Honduras	7:39.33	
3	Gerardo Campa	Independent Athletes Team	7:41.88	
4	Israel Salavarría	Ecuador	8:00.36	
5	Kyle Spenard	Barbados	8:09.31	

=== Final B ===
Rank	Rowers	Country	Time	Notes
1	Álvaro Torres	Peru	7:14.87	
2	Arturo Rivarola	Paraguay	7:23.21	
3	Ignacio Vasquez	Dominican Republic	7:29.63	
4	Jakson Vicent	Venezuela	7:36.32	
5	Roberto López	El Salvador	7:43.04	
6	Felix Potoy	Nicaragua	7:58.59	

=== Final A ===
Rank	Rowers	Country	Time	Notes
1st place, gold medalist(s)	Lucas Verthein	Brazil	6:58.76	
2nd place, silver medalist(s)	James Plihal	United States	6:59.93	
3rd place, bronze medalist(s)	Juan José Flores	Mexico	7:01.27	
4	Bruno Cetraro	Uruguay	7:01.34	
5	Shane Willis	Canada	7:12.81	
6	Javier Insfran	Paraguay	7:12.92	
