= Melita Abraham =

Chilean rower (born 1997)

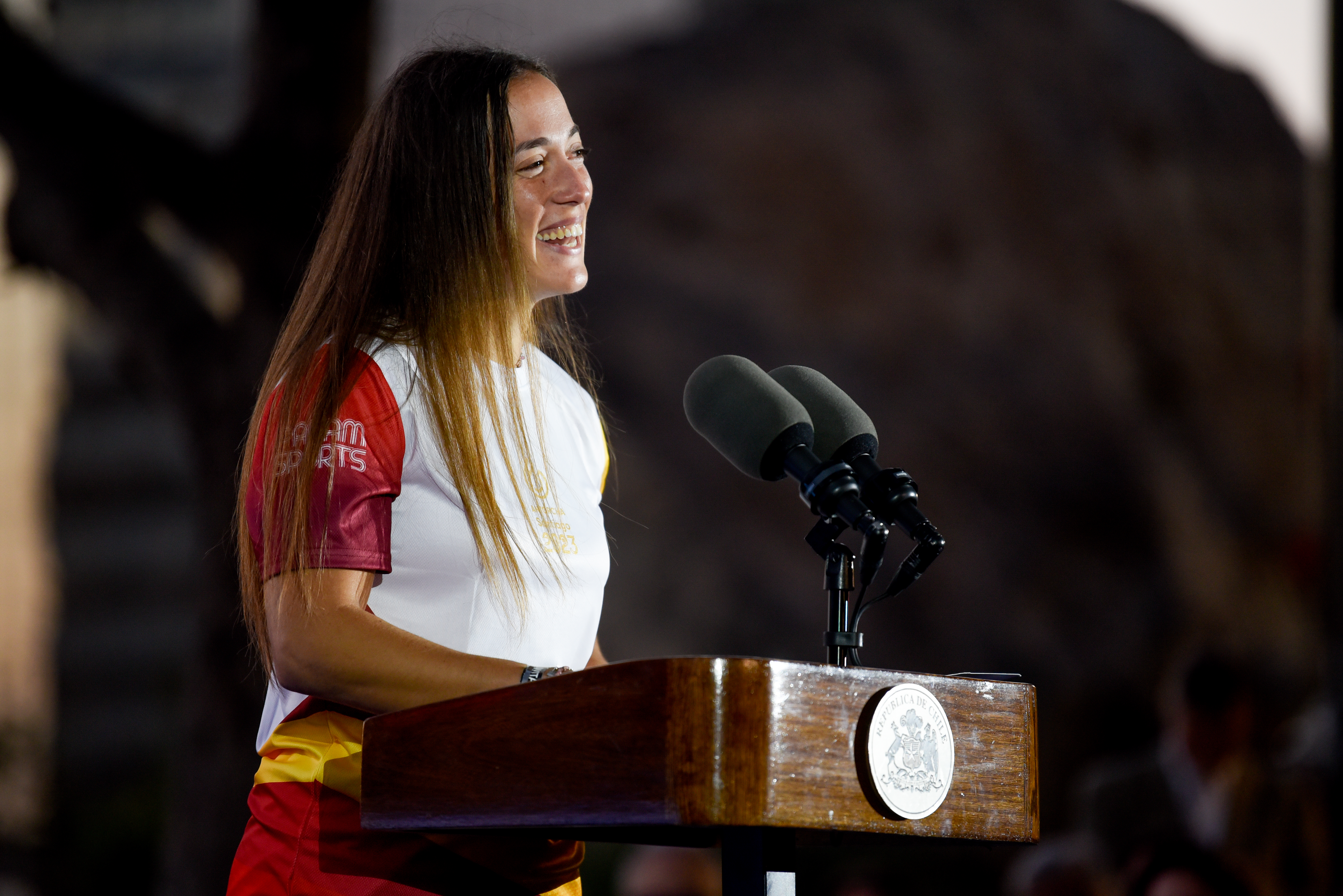
- Abaham in 2023

Personal information
- Full name: Melita Isidora Abraham Schüssler
- Born: 7 July 1997 (age 29) San Pedro de la Paz, Chile

Sport
- Sport: Rowing
Medal record
Women's rowing
Representing Chile
Pan American Games
Gold medal – first place	2019 Lima	Quadruple sculls
Gold medal – first place	2019 Lima	Coxless pair
Gold medal – first place	2023 Santiago	Coxless four
Silver medal – second place	2015 Toronto	Coxless pair
Silver medal – second place	2023 Santiago	Double sculls
Silver medal – second place	2023 Santiago	Mixed eight
Bronze medal – third place	2023 Santiago	Eight
South American Games
Gold medal – first place	2018 Cochabamba	Lightweight single sculls
Gold medal – first place	2018 Cochabamba	Double sculls
Gold medal – first place	2018 Cochabamba	Quadruple sculls
Gold medal – first place	2018 Cochabamba	Coxless pair
Gold medal – first place	2022 Asunción	Double sculls
Gold medal – first place	2022 Asunción	Quadruple sculls
Gold medal – first place	2022 Asunción	Coxless pair
Gold medal – first place	2026 Santa Fe	Quadruple sculls
Gold medal – first place	2026 Santa Fe	Coxless pair
Gold medal – first place	2026 Santa Fe	Coxless four
Gold medal – first place	2026 Santa Fe	Eight
Silver medal – second place	2026 Santa Fe	Mixed eight
Bolivarian Games
Gold medal – first place	2013 Trujillo	Single sculls
Gold medal – first place	2013 Trujillo	Double sculls
Gold medal – first place	2017 Santa Marta	Lightweight single sculls
Gold medal – first place	2017 Santa Marta	Double sculls
Gold medal – first place	2017 Santa Marta	Quadruple sculls
Gold medal – first place	2017 Santa Marta	Lightweight quadruple sculls
Gold medal – first place	2022 Valledupar	Double sculls
Gold medal – first place	2022 Valledupar	Quadruple sculls

Melita Isidora Abraham Schüssler (born 7 July 1997) is a Chilean rower. Together with quadruplet sister Antonia, they have won several medals at age-group championships, including gold in the coxless pair at the 2017 World U23 Championships.

She won gold medals in the coxless pair and quadruple sculls events at the 2019 Pan American Games.

Schüssler is also a 2015 Pan American Games silver medallist in the coxless pair and has competed in the lightweight double sculls event at the 2016 Summer Olympics. She is also a multi-medalist at the South American Games and the Bolivarian Games.
