= Antonia Abraham =

Chilean rower (born 1997)

Personal information
- Born: Antonia Francisca Abraham Schüssler; 7 July 1997 (age 29) San Pedro de la Paz, Chile

Sport
- Sport: Rowing
Medal record
Women's rowing
Representing Chile
Pan American Games
Gold medal – first place	2019 Lima	Quadruple sculls
Gold medal – first place	2019 Lima	Coxless pair
Gold medal – first place	2023 Santiago	Coxless four
Silver medal – second place	2015 Toronto	Coxless pair
Silver medal – second place	2023 Santiago	Double sculls
Silver medal – second place	2023 Santiago	Mixed eight
Bronze medal – third place	2023 Santiago	Eight
South American Games
Gold medal – first place	2018 Cochabamba	Single sculls
Gold medal – first place	2018 Cochabamba	Double sculls
Gold medal – first place	2018 Cochabamba	Quadruple sculls
Gold medal – first place	2018 Cochabamba	Coxless pair
Gold medal – first place	2022 Asunción	Quadruple sculls
Gold medal – first place	2022 Asunción	Coxless pair
Gold medal – first place	2026 Santa Fe	Quadruple sculls
Gold medal – first place	2026 Santa Fe	Coxless pair
Gold medal – first place	2026 Santa Fe	Coxless four
Gold medal – first place	2026 Santa Fe	Eight
Silver medal – second place	2026 Santa Fe	Mixed eight
Bronze medal – third place	2014 Santiago	Single sculls
Bronze medal – third place	2022 Asunción	Single sculls
Bolivarian Games
Gold medal – first place	2013 Trujillo	Double sculls
Gold medal – first place	2017 Santa Marta	Single sculls
Gold medal – first place	2017 Santa Marta	Double sculls
Gold medal – first place	2017 Santa Marta	Quadruple sculls
Gold medal – first place	2022 Valledupar	Single sculls
Gold medal – first place	2022 Valledupar	Quadruple sculls

Antonia Francisca Abraham Schüssler (born 7 July 1997) is a Chilean rower. On 8 July 2024, the Chilean Olympic Committee selected her and the male Tennis player Nicolás Jarry as the flag bearers to the París 2024 Olympic Games.

== Rowing career ==
Together with quadruplet sister Melita, they have won several medals at age-group championships, including gold in the coxless pair at the 2017 World U23 Championships.

Together with Melita, she won gold medals in the coxless pair and quadruple sculls events at the 2019 Pan American Games. They repeated the feat four years later, in the coxless four at the 2023 Pan American Games.

She is also a 2015 Pan American Games silver medallist in the coxless pair, and a multi-medalist at the South American Games and the Bolivarian Games.

Olympic Games
Preceded by Dominique Ohaco; Henrik Von Appen	Flagbearer for Chile; París 2024; With: Nicolás Jarry	Succeeded by Incumbent
