= 2025 World Rowing Championships – Women's lightweight single sculls =

Women's lightweight single sculls at the 2025 World Rowing Championships
- Venue: Dianshan Lake
- Location: Shanghai, China
- Dates: 23–27 September
- Competitors: 15 from 15 nations
- Winning time: 7:30.14

Medalists
gold medal	Michelle Sechser	United States
silver medal	Pan Dandan	China
bronze medal	Kenia Lechuga	Mexico

The women's lightweight single sculls competition at the 2025 World Rowing Championships took place at Dianshan Lake, in Shanghai.

== Schedule ==
The schedule was as follows:

Date	Time	Round
Tuesday 23 September 2025	10:05	Heats
Thursday, 25 September 2025	10:31	Semifinals
Thursday, 25 September 2025	11:22	Final C
Saturday, 27 September 2025	13:25	Final B
Saturday, 27 September 2025	14:33	Final A

All times are UTC+08:00

== Results ==
=== Heats ===
The two fastest boats in each heat and the six fastest times advanced to the semifinals. The remaining boats were sent to the Final C.

==== Heat 1 ====
Rank	Rower	Country	Time	Notes
1	Kenia Lechuga	Mexico	7:35.42	SF
2	Karissa Riley	Canada	7:36.80	SF
3	Siobhan McCrohan	Ireland	7:36.98	SF
4	Nicole Yarzon	Uruguay	7:54.33	SF
5	Kim Ji-seon	South Korea	8:19.87	FC
6	Binti Zakaria Nurzarinah	Malaysia	DNS	

==== Heat 2 ====
Rank	Rower	Country	Time	Notes
1	Mariia Zhovner	Individual Neutral Athletes	7:44.31	SF
2	Dimitra Kontou	Greece	7:51.87	SF
3	Maia Emilie Lund	Norway	7:55.32	SF
4	Eszter Fehérvári	Hungary	8:05.31	FC
5	Mariya Chernets	Kazakhstan	8:22.46	FC

==== Heat 3 ====
Rank	Rower	Country	Time	Notes
1	Michelle Sechser	United States	7:33.64	SF
2	Pan Dandan	China	7:36.79	SF
3	Lara Tiefenthaler	Austria	7:40.99	SF
4	Femke van de Vliet	Netherlands	7:44.91	SF
5	Winne Hung	Hong Kong	7:45.72	SF

=== Semifinals ===
The three fastest boats in each heat advance to the Final A. The remaining boats were sent to the Final B.

==== Semifinal 1 ====
Rank	Rower	Country	Time	Notes
1	Michelle Sechser	United States	8:01.20	FA
2	Pan Dandan	China	8:04.05	FA
3	Lara Tiefenthaler	Austria	8:05.48	FA
4	Karissa Riley	Canada	8:06.77	FB
5	Femke van de Vliet	Netherlands	8:18.08	FB
6	Maia Emilie Lund	Norway	8:26.63	FB

==== Semifinal 2 ====
Rank	Rower	Country	Time	Notes
1	Siobhan McCrohan	Ireland	8:06.23	FA
2	Kenia Lechuga	Mexico	8:06.27	FA
3	Mariia Zhovner	Individual Neutral Athletes	8:06.35	FA
4	Nicole Yarzon	Uruguay	8:12.40	FB
5	Dimitra Kontou	Greece	8:20.19	FB
6	Winne Hung	Hong Kong	8:23.83	FB

=== Finals ===
The A final determined the rankings for places 1 to 6. Additional rankings were determined in the other finals.

==== Final C ====
Rank	Rower	Country	Time	Total rank
1	Eszter Fehérvári	Hungary	8:36.56	13
2	Kim Ji-seon	South Korea	8:46.68	14
3	Mariya Chernets	Kazakhstan	8:56.70	15

==== Final B ====
Rank	Rower	Country	Time	Total rank
1	Karissa Riley	Canada	7:43.47	7
2	Femke van de Vliet	Netherlands	7:47.08	8
3	Winne Hung	Hong Kong	7:50.21	9
4	Dimitra Kontou	Greece	7:52.52	10
5	Maia Emilie Lund	Norway	7:54.41	11
6	Nicole Yarzon	Uruguay	8:09.88	12

==== Final A ====
Rank	Rower	Country	Time	Notes
1st place, gold medalist(s)	Michelle Sechser	United States	7:30.14	
2nd place, silver medalist(s)	Pan Dandan	China	7:30.45	
3rd place, bronze medalist(s)	Kenia Lechuga	Mexico	7:32.23	
4	Siobhan McCrohan	Ireland	7:37.25	
5	Lara Tiefenthaler	Austria	7:40.30	
6	Mariia Zhovner	Individual Neutral Athletes	7:42.89	
