= Rowing at the 2023 Pan American Games – Women's double sculls =

Women's double sculls at the 2023 Pan American Games
- Venue: Laguna Grande
- Dates: October 21 – October 25
- Competitors: 20 from 10 nations
- Winning time: 7:02.11

Medalists
Gold medal	Madeleine Focht; Veronica Nicacio	United States
Silver medal	Melita Abraham; Antonia Abraham	Chile
Bronze medal	Alizée Brien; Shaye de Paiva	Canada

The women's double sculls competition of the rowing events at the 2023 Pan American Games was held from October 21 to 25 at Laguna Grande in San Pedro de la Paz, Chile.

== Schedule ==
Date	Time	Round
October 21, 2023	8:40	Heat 1
October 21, 2023	8:50	Heat 2
October 22, 2023	8:00	Repechage
October 25, 2023	8:20	Final A
October 25, 2023	9:00	Final B

== Results ==
=== Heats ===
==== Heat 1 ====
Rank	Rowers	Country	Time	Notes
1	Melita Abraham; Antonia Abraham	Chile	7:24:80	FA
2	Madeleine Focht; Veronica Nicacio	United States	7:26:38	FA
3	Mildred Mercado; Maite Arrillaga	Mexico	7:42:99	R
4	Gabriela Mosqueira; Fiorella Rodríguez	Paraguay	7:50:37	R
5	Ysmaly Granadino; Keyla García	Venezuela	8:18:98	R

==== Heat 2 ====
Rank	Rowers	Country	Time	Notes
1	Alizée Brien; Shaye de Paiva	Canada	7:32:91	FA
2	Milena Venega; Yariulvis Cobas	Cuba	7:37:71	FA
3	Chloe Gorski; Thalita Rosa	Brazil	7:39:42	R
4	Oriana Ruiz; Clara Galfre	Argentina	7:39:96	R
5	Ynela Aires; Romina Cetraro	Uruguay	8:03:15	R

=== Repechage ===
Rank	Rowers	Country	Time	Notes
1	Oriana Ruiz; Clara Galfre	Argentina	7:20.99	FA
2	Chloe Gorski; Thalita Rosa	Brazil	7:22.08	FA
3	Mildred Mercado; Maite Arrillaga	Mexico	7:"6.28	FB
4	Gabriela Mosqueira; Fiorella Rodríguez	Paraguay	7:29.74	FB
5	Ynela Aires; Romina Cetraro	Uruguay	7:41.38	FB
6	Ysmaly Granadino; Keyla García	Venezuela	8:02.09	FB

=== Final B ===
Rank	Rowers	Country	Time	Notes
1	Gabriela Mosqueira; Fiorella Rodríguez	Paraguay	7:28.22	
2	Mildred Mercado; Maite Arrillaga	Mexico	7:31.84	
3	Ynela Aires; Romina Cetraro	Uruguay	7:36.26	
4	Ysmaly Granadino; Keyla García	Venezuela	8:04.83	

=== Final A ===
Rank	Rowers	Country	Time	Notes
1st place, gold medalist(s)	Madeleine Focht; Veronica Nicacio	United States	7:02.11	
2nd place, silver medalist(s)	Melita Abraham; Antonia Abraham	Chile	7:03.74	
3rd place, bronze medalist(s)	Alizée Brien; Shaye de Paiva	Canada	7:13.14	
4	Oriana Ruiz; Clara Galfre	Argentina	7:18.17	
5	Milena Venega; Yariulvis Cobas	Cuba	7:19.80	
6	Chloe Gorski; Thalita Rosa	Brazil	7:24.95	
