= Kenia Lechuga =

Mexican rower (born 1994)

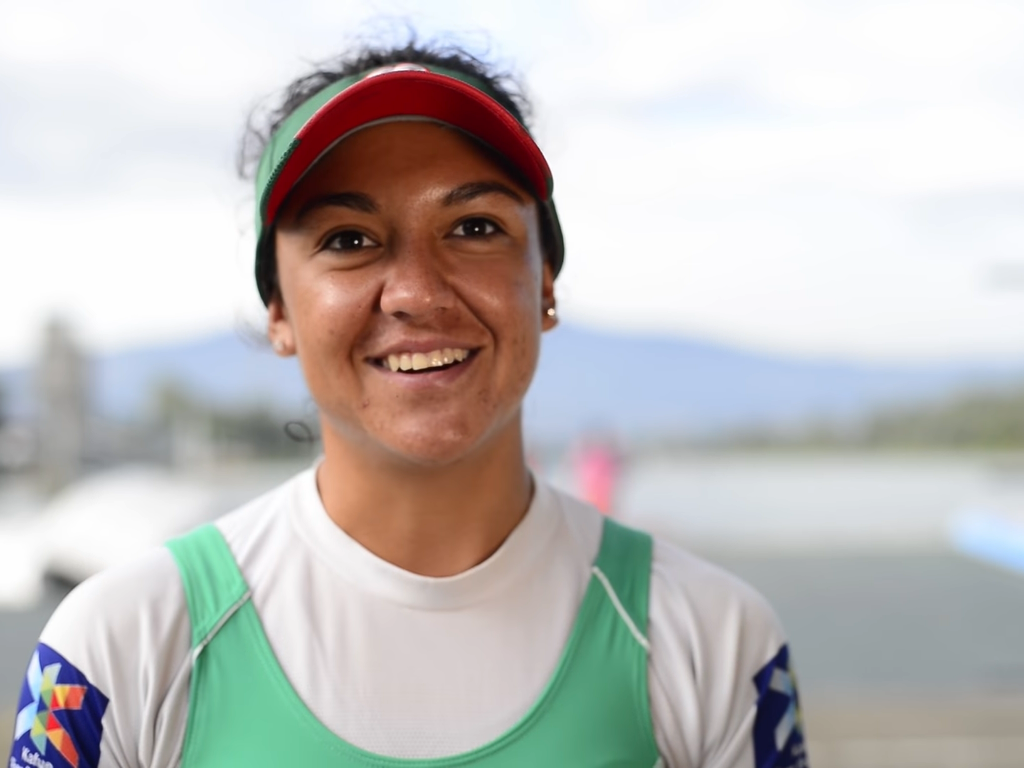
- Lechuga in 2016

Personal information
- Full name: Kenia Vanessa Lechuga Alanís
- Born: 26 June 1994 (age 32) Santiago, Nuevo León, Mexico
- Height: 1.62 m (5 ft 4 in)
- Weight: 59 kg (130 lb)

Sport
- Country: Mexico
- Sport: Rowing
Medal record
Women's rowing
Representing Mexico
World Championships
Gold medal – first place	2026 Amsterdam	Lightweight single sculls
Silver medal – second place	2023 Belgrade	Lightweight single sculls
Bronze medal – third place	2025 Shanghai	Lightweight single sculls
Pan American Games
Gold medal – first place	2019 Lima	Lightweight single sculls
Gold medal – first place	2023 Santiago	Single sculls

Kenia Vanessa Lechuga Alanís (Note: In this Spanish name, the first or paternal surname is Lechuga and the second or maternal family name is Alanís.) (born 26 June 1994) is a Mexican competitive rower.

She competed at the 2016 Summer Olympics in Rio de Janeiro, in the women's single sculls, where she placed 12th. She won a gold medal in lightweight single sculls at the 2019 Pan American Games. She qualified and competed in the Tokyo 2020 Olympics, placing 16th in the women's lightweight single sculls. She won the silver medal in the lightweight women's single sculls at the 2023 senior World Rowing Championships, making history as the first Mexican to medal at the senior World Rowing Championships. She qualified for the Paris 2024 Olympics in the open weight category for women's single sculls. She is recognized for her ability to perform well in challenging water conditions, notably during the Rio 2016 Olympics where she achieved a strong result in rough waters.
