= 2025 World Rowing Championships – Women's lightweight double sculls =

Women's lightweight double sculls at the 2025 World Rowing Championships
- Venue: Dianshan Lake
- Location: Shanghai, China
- Dates: 21–25 September
- Competitors: 10 from 5 nations
- Winning time: 7:26.12

Medalists
gold medal	Zou Jiaqi; Fu Ling	China
silver medal	Khadija Krimi; Selma Dhaouadi	Tunisia
bronze medal	Alessia Palacios; Valeria Palacios	Peru

The women's lightweight double sculls competition at the 2025 World Rowing Championships took place at Dianshan Lake, in Shanghai.

== Schedule ==
The schedule was as follows:

Date	Time	Round
Sunday 21 September 2025	10:05	Preliminary race
Thursday, 25 September 2025	14:05	Final A

All times are UTC+08:00

== Results ==
=== Preliminary round ===
All boats advanced to the final.

Rank	Rower	Country	Time	Notes
1	Zou Jiaqi; Fu Ling	China	6:54.85	FA
2	Alessia Palacios; Valeria Palacios	Peru	7:09.35	FA
3	Khadija Krimi; Selma Dhaouadi	Tunisia	7:10.72	FA
4	Chelsea Corputty; Mutiara Rahma Putri	Indonesia	7:15.02	FA
5	Leung Wing Wun; Claire Susan Burley	Hong Kong	7:15.56	FA

=== Final ===
The final took place at 14:05 on 25 September.

Rank	Rower	Country	Time	Notes
1st place, gold medalist(s)	Zou Jiaqi; Fu Ling	China	7:26.12	
2nd place, silver medalist(s)	Khadija Krimi; Selma Dhaouadi	Tunisia	7:40.90	
3rd place, bronze medalist(s)	Alessia Palacios; Valeria Palacios	Peru	7:46.04	
4	Leung Wing Wun; Claire Susan Burley	Hong Kong	7:52.49	
5	Chelsea Corputty; Mutiara Rahma Putri	Indonesia	8:01.26	
