= Katarzyna Wełna =

Polish rower and cyclist (born 1994)

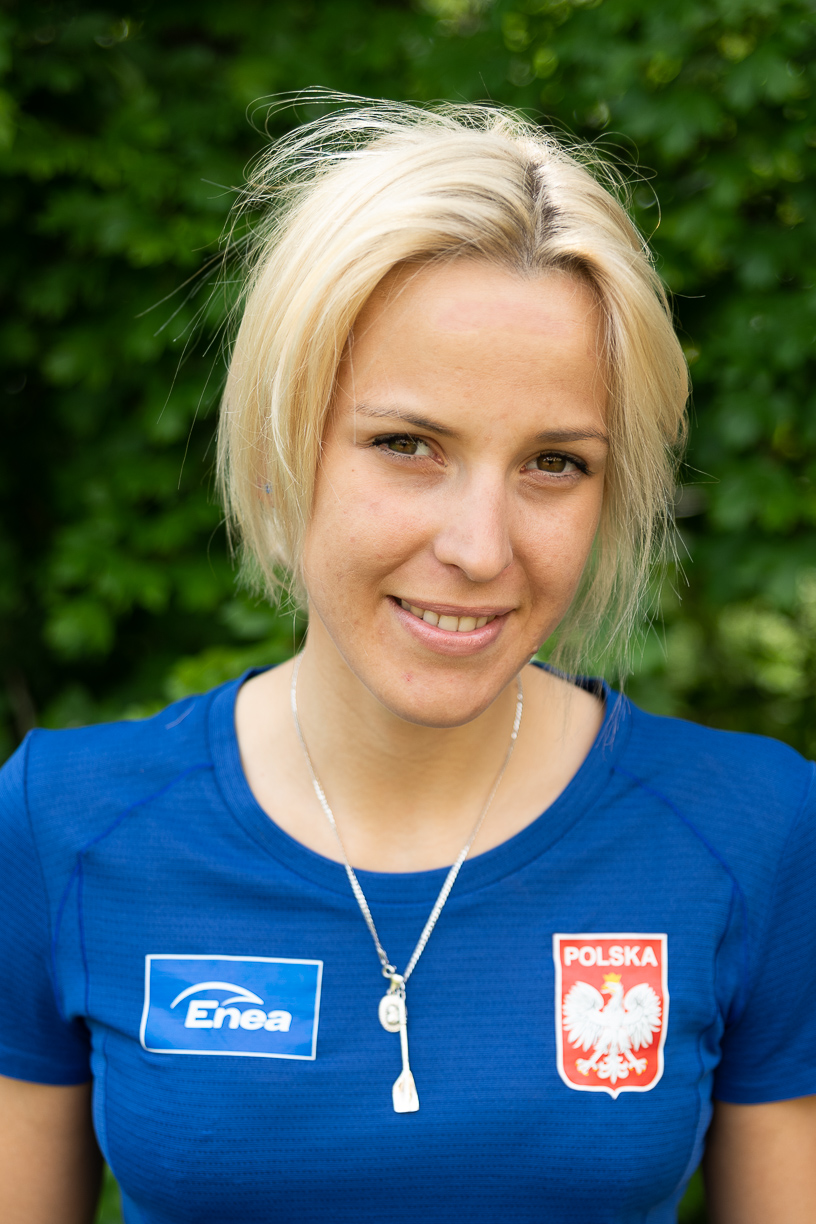
- Wełna in 2019

Personal information
- Born: 6 March 1994 (age 32)
- Height: 169 cm (5 ft 7 in)

Sport
- Club: AZS-AWF Kraków
Medal record
Women's rowing
Representing Poland
World Championships
Gold medal – first place	2024 St. Catharines	LW2-

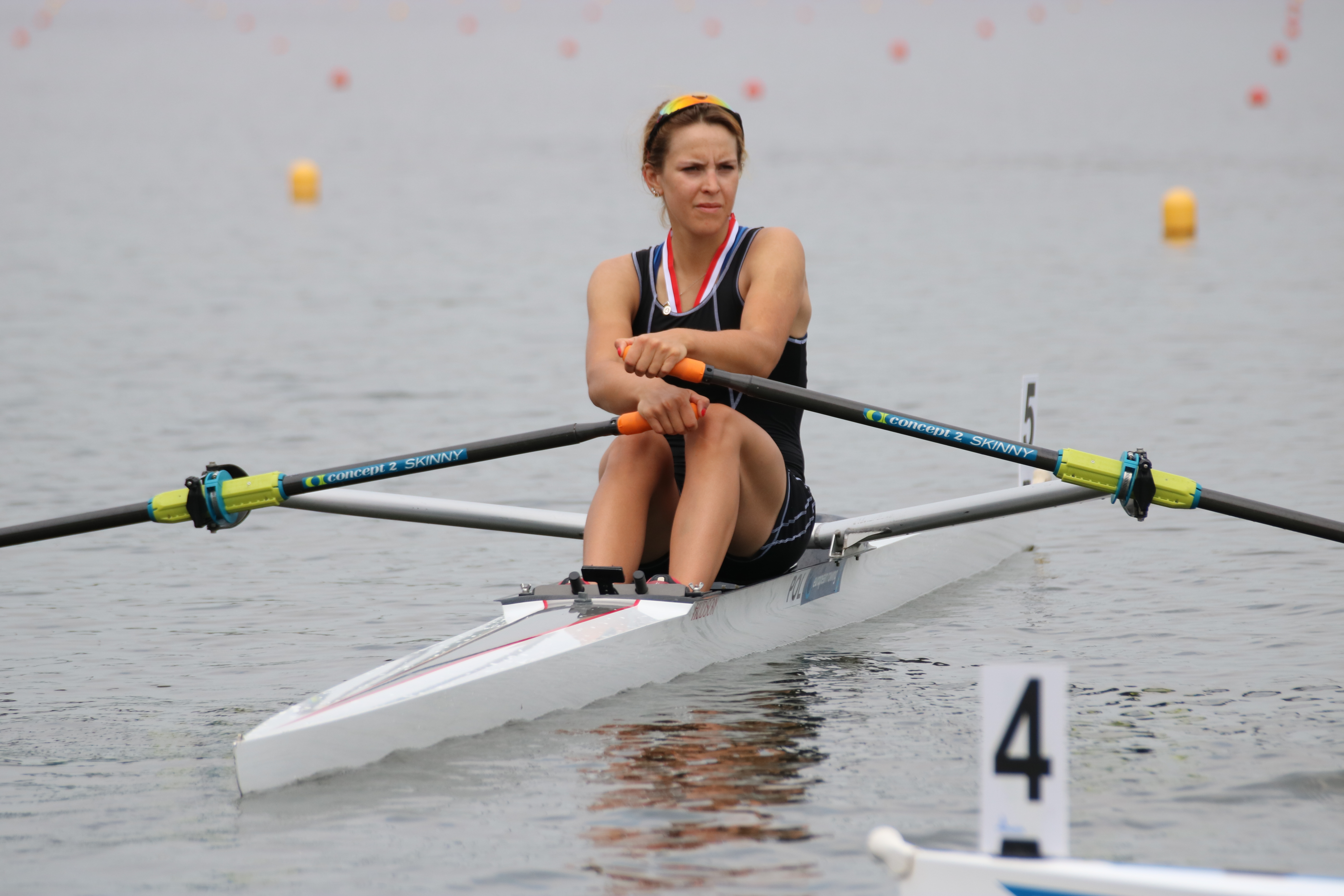
K. Wełna during the 2018 Polish Championships

Katarzyna Wełna (born 6 March 1994) is a Polish rower and cyclist, bronze medalist at the European Rowing Championships.

She comes from Stanisławice near Kraków. She started rowing at the age of eleven. She completed primary school in her hometown and then attended the School of Sports Mastery in Kraków. After high school, she studied physical education at the Academy of Physical Education in Kraków.

From her youth until junior years, she competed for UKS 93 Kraków. Currently, she represents AZS-AWF Kraków.

She also competes in amateur cycling races. In 2018, she won the Beskid Classic.

In 2014, she underwent surgery and had a break in her career due to complications. She returned to rowing in 2018.

== World Cup ==
- 3rd place (Lucerne 2018; Plovdiv 2019)

== Results ==
Year	Event	Venue	Competition	Time	Position
2012	Junior European Championships	SVN Bled	Single sculls	No data	3rd place
2012	Junior World Championships	BGR Plovdiv	Single sculls	B Final: 8:04.16	11th place
2013	European Championships	ESP Seville	Lightweight double sculls	A Final: 7:47.10	3rd place
2013	World Championships	KOR Chungju	Lightweight double sculls	B Final: 7:25.19	10th place
2015	European Championships	POL Poznań	Lightweight single sculls	B Final: 7:51.00	10th place
2015	U23 World Championships	BGR Plovdiv	Lightweight double sculls	A Final: 7:10.66	6th place
2016	U23 European Championships	NLD Rotterdam	Double sculls	B Final: 7:07.67	7th place
2018	European Championships	GBR Glasgow	Lightweight single sculls	A Final: 7:51.25	4th place
2018	World Championships	BGR Plovdiv	Lightweight single sculls	B Final: 7:52.37	8th place
2019	World Championships	AUT Ottensheim	Lightweight double sculls	C Final: 7:05.73	15th place
2020	European Championships	POL Poznań	Lightweight single sculls	A Final: 7:55.82	5th place
