= Rowing at the 2019 Pan American Games =

- Rowing pictogram
- Venue: Albufera Medio Mundo
- Dates: August 6–10, 2019
- No. of events: 14 (8 men, 6 women)
- Competitors: 220

Rowing competitions at the 2019 Pan American Games in Lima, Peru, were held between August 6 and 10, 2019, at Albufera Medio Mundo in Huacho.

Fourteen medal events were contested, eight for males and six for females.

== Medal table ==
| Rank | Nation | Gold | Silver | Bronze | Total |
|---|---|---|---|---|---|
| 1 | Argentina | 4 | 2 | 3 | 9 |
| 2 | Chile | 4 | 2 | 2 | 8 |
| 3 | Cuba | 2 | 4 | 4 | 10 |
| 4 | Mexico | 2 | 2 | 2 | 6 |
| 5 | Canada | 2 | 1 | 0 | 3 |
| 6 | Brazil | 0 | 1 | 2 | 3 |
| 7 | United States | 0 | 1 | 1 | 2 |
| 8 | Trinidad and Tobago | 0 | 1 | 0 | 1 |
| Totals (8 entries) | | 14 | 14 | 14 | 42 |

== Medalists ==
=== Men's events ===
| Event | Gold | Silver | Bronze |
|---|---|---|---|
| Single sculls | Ángel Fournier; Cuba | Juan Carlos Cabrera; Mexico | Brian Rosso; Argentina |
| Double sculls | Argentina; Rodrigo Murillo; Cristian Rosso | Cuba; Boris Guerra; Adrián Oquendo | Brazil; Uncas Batista; Lucas Verthein |
| Lightweight double sculls | Mexico; Alan Armenta; Alexis López | Argentina; Alejandro Colomino; Carlo Lauro Gracia | Chile; César Abaroa; Eber Sanhueza |
| Quadruple sculls^{[a]} | Argentina; Rodrigo Murillo; Brian Rosso; Cristian Rosso; Ariel Suárez | Cuba; Reidy Cardona; Boris Guerra; Adrián Oquendo; Jorge Patterson | Mexico; Hugo Carpio; Jordy Gutiérrez; Diego Sánchez; Miguel Carballo |
| Coxless pair | Chile; Ignacio Abraham; Christopher Kalleg | Brazil; Pau Vela; Xavier Vela | Argentina; Agustín Díaz; Axel Haack |
| Coxless four | Argentina; Iván Carino; Agustín Díaz; Francisco Esteras; Azel Haack | Cuba; Carlos Ajete; Reidy Cardona; Eduardo González; Jesús Rodríguez | Brazil; Gabriel Campos; Alef Fontoura; Willian Giaretton; Fábio Moreira |
| Lightweight coxless four | Chile; Felipe Cárdenas; Roberto Liewald; Fabián Oyarzún; Felipe Oyarzún | Mexico; Angy Canul; Alexis López; Rafael Mejía; Marco Velázquez | Cuba; Alexei Carballosa; Osvaldo Pérez; Ennier Tamayo; Yhoan Uribarri |
| Coxed eight | Argentina; Iván Carino; Francisco Esteras; Axel Haack; Tomás Herrera; Joel Infante; Rodrigo Murillo; Joel Romero; Agustín Scenna; Ariel Suárez | Chile; César Abaroa; Alfredo Abraham; Ignacio Abraham; Selim Echeverría; Christopher Kalleg; Francisco Lapostol; Antonia Liewald; Nelson Martínez; Óscar Vásquez | Cuba; Carlos Ajete; Reidy Cardona; Eduardo González; Boris Guerra; Yoelvis Hernández; Adrián Oquendo; Jorge Patterson; Jesús Rodríguez; Yadian Rodríguez |

- ^{Men's quadruple sculls} Marcos Sarraute was stripped of his gold medal due to a doping violation. Uruguay team was disqualified.

=== Women's events ===
| Event | Gold | Silver | Bronze |
|---|---|---|---|
| Single sculls | Jessica Sevick; Canada | Felice Chow; Trinidad and Tobago | Soraya Jadué; Chile |
| Lightweight single sculls | Kenia Lechuga; Mexico | Milka Kraljev; Argentina | Milena Venega; Cuba |
| Double sculls | Cuba; Yariulvis Cobas; Aimeé Hernández | United States; Margaret Fellows; Julia Lonchar | Argentina; Milka Kraljev; Oriana Ruiz |
| Lightweight double sculls | Canada; Katherine Haber; Jaclyn Stelmaszyk | Chile; Isidora Niemeyer; Yoselyn Cárcamo | Cuba; Rosana Serrano; Milena Venega |
| Quadruple sculls | Chile; Melita Abraham; Antonia Abraham; Soraya Jadué; Isidora Niemeyer | Cuba; Yariulvis Cobas; Marelis González; Aimeé Hernández; Rayma Ortíz | United States; Margaret Fellows; Solveig Imsdahl; Julia Lonchar; Keara Twist |
| Coxless pair | Chile; Melita Abraham; Antonia Abraham | Canada; Jessie Loutit; Larissa Werbicki | Mexico; Maite Arrillaga; Fernanda Ceballos |

== Qualification ==
A total of 220 rowers will qualify to compete at the games. A country may only enter a maximum of 26 rowers. All qualification will be done at the 2018 Qualifier Championship (except the men's eights which will be by entry only), where a specific number of boats will qualify in each of the fourteen events.
