= 2026 World Rowing Championships – Women's lightweight single sculls =

Women's lightweight single sculls at the 2026 World Rowing Championships
- Venue: Bosbaan
- Location: Amsterdam, Netherlands
- Dates: 24–27 August
- Competitors: 13 from 13 nations
- Winning time: 7:29.16

Medalists
gold medal	Kenia Lechuga	Mexico
silver medal	Mariia Zhovner
bronze medal	Femke van de Vliet	Netherlands

The women's lightweight single sculls competition at the 2026 World Rowing Championships took place at Bosbaan, in Amsterdam.

== Schedule ==
The schedule was as follows:

Date	Time	Round
Monday 24 August 2026	17:05	Heats
Wednesday 26 August 2026	17:05	Semifinals
Thursday, 27 August 2026	15:16	Final B
Thursday, 27 August 2026	18:00	Final A

All times are Central European Summer Time (UTC+2)

== Results ==
=== Heats ===
The two fastest boats in each heat and the six fastest times advanced to the semifinals. Remaining crew eliminated.

==== Heat 1 ====
Rank	Rower	Country	Time	Notes
1	Femke van de Vliet	Netherlands	8:42.26	SF
2	Valeryia Shendzel	Individual Neutral Athletes 2	8:50.53	SF
3	Joan Poh	Singapore	9:13.76	SF
4	Noémi Mészárosová	Slovakia	9:34.75	SF
5	Majdouline El Allaoui	Morocco	10:05.28	SF

==== Heat 2 ====
Rank	Rower	Country	Time	Notes
1	Kenia Lechuga	Mexico	8:43.68	SF
2	Claire Friedlander	United States	8:52.65	SF
3	Johanna Reichardt	Germany	8:54.29	SF
4	Sukaina Atal	Syria	10:33.58	

==== Heat 3 ====
Rank	Rower	Country	Time	Notes
1	Mariia Zhovner	Individual Neutral Athletes 1	8:31.85	SF
2	Nicole Yarzon	Uruguay	8:54.63	SF
3	Done Erasmus	Zimbabwe	9:28.65	SF
4	Binti Zakaria Nurzarinah	Malaysia	9:43.11	SF

=== Semifinals ===
The three fastest boats in each heat advance to the Final A. The remaining boats were sent to the Final B.

==== Semifinal 1 ====
Rank	Rower	Country	Time	Notes
1	Kenia Lechuga	Mexico	8:38.71	FA
2	Mariia Zhovner	Individual Neutral Athletes 1	8:41.87	FA
3	Claire Friedlander	United States	8:58.44	FA
4	Joan Poh	Singapore	9:19.13	FB
5	Noémi Mészárosová	Slovakia	9:35.83	FB
6	Majdouline El Allaoui	Morocco	9:48.36	FB

==== Semifinal 2 ====
Rank	Rower	Country	Time	Notes
1	Femke van de Vliet	Netherlands	8:15.91	FA
2	Nicole Yarzon	Uruguay	8:20.81	FA
3	Valeryia Shendzel	Individual Neutral Athletes 2	8:21.23	FA
4	Johanna Reichardt	Germany	8:31.98	FB
5	Done Erasmus	Zimbabwe	8:56.20	FB
6	Binti Zakaria Nurzarinah	Malaysia	9:13.03	FB

=== Finals ===
The A final determined the rankings for places 1 to 6. Additional rankings were determined in the other finals.

==== Final B ====
Rank	Rower	Country	Time	Total rank
1	Johanna Reichardt	Germany	8:39.20	7
2	Joan Poh	Singapore	8:57.36	8
3	Done Erasmus	Zimbabwe	8:59.67	9
4	Noémi Mészárosová	Slovakia	9:04.42	10
5	Binti Zakaria Nurzarinah	Malaysia	9:22.31	11
6	Majdouline El Allaoui	Morocco	9:26.16	12

==== Final A ====
Rank	Rower	Country	Time
1st place, gold medalist(s)	Kenia Lechuga	Mexico	7:29.16
2nd place, silver medalist(s)	Mariia Zhovner	Individual Neutral Athletes 1	7:32.73
3rd place, bronze medalist(s)	Femke van de Vliet	Netherlands	7:35.56
4	Valeryia Shendzel	Individual Neutral Athletes 2	7:38.26
5	Claire Friedlander	United States	7:44.96
6	Nicole Yarzon	Uruguay	7:48.59
