= Rowing at the 2015 Pan American Games – Women's coxless pair =

Rowing – Women's coxless pair at the 2015 Pan American Games
- Venue: Royal Canadian Henley Rowing Course
- Dates: 11 – 13 July
- Competitors: 12 from 6 nations
- Winning time: 7:20.98

Medalists
Gold medal	Emily Huelskamp; Molly Bruggeman	United States
Silver medal	Melita Abraham; Antonia Abraham	Chile
Bronze medal	Rosie DeBoef; Kristin Bauder	Canada

The women's coxless pair rowing event at the 2015 Pan American Games was held from 11 to 13 July at the Royal Canadian Henley Rowing Course in St. Catharines.

== Schedule ==
All times are Eastern Standard Time (UTC-3).

Date	Time	Round
11 July 2015	9:15	Heat
13 July 2015	9:45	Final

== Results ==
=== Heat ===
Rank	Rowers	Country	Time	Notes
1	Emily Huelskamp; Molly Bruggeman	United States	7:19.44	F
2	Rosie DeBoef; Kristin Bauder	Canada	7:36.11	F
3	Melita Abraham; Antonia Abraham	Chile	7:36.36	F
4	Dolores Amaya; Oriana Ruiz	Argentina	7:44.17	F
5	Yarilexis Reyes; Yeney Ochoa	Cuba	7:57.79	F
6	Evidelia González Jarquin; Ana Vanegas Jarquin	Nicaragua	8:00.59	F

=== Final ===
Rank	Rowers	Country	Time	Notes
1st place, gold medalist(s)	Emily Huelskamp; Molly Bruggeman	United States	7:20.98	
2nd place, silver medalist(s)	Melita Abraham; Antonia Abraham	Chile	7:32.77	
3rd place, bronze medalist(s)	Rosie DeBoef; Kristin Bauder	Canada	7:34.23	
4	Dolores Amaya; Oriana Ruiz	Argentina	7:53.99	
5	Yarilexis Reyes; Yeney Ochoa	Cuba	8:01.65	
6	Evidelia González Jarquin; Ana Vanegas Jarquin	Nicaragua	8:12.45	
