= 2023 World Rowing Championships – Women's lightweight single sculls =

Women's lightweight single sculls at the 2023 World Rowing Championships
- Venue: Lake Sava
- Location: Belgrade, Serbia
- Dates: 3 September – 8 September
- Competitors: 20 from 20 nations
- Winning time: 8:47.96

Medalists
gold medal	Siobhán McCrohan	Ireland
silver medal	Kenia Lechuga	Mexico
bronze medal	Sophia Luwis	United States

The women's lightweight single sculls competition at the 2023 World Rowing Championships took place at Lake Sava, in Belgrade.

== Schedule ==
The schedule was as follows:

Date	Time	Round
Sunday 3 September 2023	11:51	Heats
Tuesday 5 September 2023	10:50	Repechages
Thursday 7 September 2023	12:35	Semifinals A/B
Thursday 7 September 2023	15:35	Semifinals C/D
Friday 8 September 2023	13:13	Final D
Friday 8 September 2023	13:29	Final C
Friday 8 September 2023	13:53	Final B
Friday 8 September 2023	14:15	Final A

All times are Central European Summer Time (UTC+2)

== Results ==
=== Heats ===
The two fastest boats in each heat advanced directly to the semifinals. The remaining boats were sent to the repechages.

==== Heat 1 ====
Rank	Rower	Country	Time	Notes
1	Martine Veldhuis	Netherlands	7:39.21	SAB
2	Aurélie Morizot	France	7:44.34	SAB
3	Adriana Escobar	El Salvador	8:14.21	R
4	Sofija Kocanović	Serbia	8:42.22	R
5	Conceição Ngola	Angola	9:54.41	R

==== Heat 2 ====
Rank	Rower	Country	Time	Notes
1	Kenia Lechuga	Mexico	7:37.13	SAB
2	Zuzanna Jasińska	Poland	7:38.74	SAB
3	Olivia Bates	Great Britain	7:40.76	R
4	Maia Emilie Lund	Norway	7:54.77	R
5	Aura Forsberg	Finland	8:09.90	R

==== Heat 3 ====
Rank	Rower	Country	Time	Notes
1	Sophia Luwis	United States	7:42.04	SAB
2	Eline Rol	Switzerland	7:42.93	SAB
3	Dora Dragičević	Croatia	7:55.81	R
4	Ilaria Corazza	Italy	8:00.97	R
5	Rachael Kennedy	New Zealand	8:05.23	R

==== Heat 4 ====
Rank	Rower	Country	Time	Notes
1	Gianina van Groningen	Romania	7:35.23	SAB
2	Siobhan McCrohan	Ireland	7:39.53	SAB
3	Chiaki Tomita	Japan	7:45.54	R
4	Teresa Díaz Moreno	Spain	7:57.21	R
	Anastasiia Liubich	Individual Neutral Athletes	EXC	

=== Repechages ===
The two fastest boats in each repechage advanced to the AB semifinals. The remaining boats were sent to the CD semifinals.

==== Repechage 1 ====
Rank	Rower	Country	Time	Notes
1	Olivia Bates	Great Britain	7:39.96	SA/B
2	Ilaria Corazza	Italy	7:44.34	SA/B
3	Teresa Díaz Moreno	Spain	7:47.87	SC/D
4	Rachael Kennedy	New Zealand	8:03.04	SC/D
5	Adriana Escobar	El Salvador	8:08.87	SC/D
6	Conceição Ngola	Angola	9:49.21	SC/D

==== Repechage 2 ====
Rank	Rower	Country	Time	Notes
1	Maia Emilie Lund	Norway	7:44.03	SA/B
2	Chiaki Tomita	Japan	7:46.36	SA/B
3	Dora Dragičević	Croatia	7:52.52	SC/D
4	Aura Forsberg	Finland	8:00.44	SC/D
5	Sofija Kocanović	Serbia	8:41.69	SC/D

=== Semifinals C/D ===
The two fastest boats in semifinal 1 and three fastest boats in semifinal 2 advanced to the C final. The remaining boats were sent to the D final.

==== Semifinal 1 ====
Rank	Rower	Country	Time	Notes
1	Teresa Díaz Moreno	Spain	9:05.40	FC
2	Adriana Escobar	El Salvador	9:09.25	FC
3	Aura Forsberg	Finland	9:09.42	FD

==== Semifinal 2 ====
Rank	Rower	Country	Time	Notes
1	Dora Dragičević	Croatia	9:12.18	FC
2	Rachael Kennedy	New Zealand	9:16.23	FC
3	Sofija Kocanović	Serbia	10:21.59	FC
4	Conceição Ngola	Angola	12:19.00	FD

=== Semifinals A/B ===
The three fastest boats in each semifinal advanced to the A final. The remaining boats were sent to the B final.

==== Semifinal 1 ====
Rank	Rower	Country	Time	Notes
1	Siobhan McCrohan	Ireland	8:44.91	FA
2	Kenia Lechuga	Mexico	8:47.00	FA
3	Martine Veldhuis	Netherlands	8:54.30	FA
4	Olivia Bates	Great Britain	8:58.61	FB
5	Eline Rol	Switzerland	9:03.74	FB
6	Chiaki Tomita	Japan	9:15.94	FB

==== Semifinal 2 ====
Rank	Rower	Country	Time	Notes
1	Sophia Luwis	United States	8:46.12	FA
2	Aurélie Morizot	France	8:47.71	FA
3	Gianina van Groningen	Romania	8:53.01	FA
4	Zuzanna Jasińska	Poland	8:59.86	FB
5	Ilaria Corazza	Italy	9:03.36	FB
6	Maia Emilie Lund	Norway	9:10.39	FB

=== Finals ===
The A final determined the rankings for places 1 to 6. Additional rankings were determined in the other finals.

==== Final D ====
Rank	Rower	Country	Time	Total rank
1	Aura Forsberg	Finland	9:18.44	18
2	Conceição Ngola	Angola	12:17.46	19

==== Final C ====
Rank	Rower	Country	Time	Total rank
1	Teresa Díaz Moreno	Spain	9:04.34	13
2	Adriana Escobar	El Salvador	9:24.12	14
3	Rachael Kennedy	New Zealand	9:35.56	15
4	Dora Dragičević	Croatia	10:17.66	16
5	Sofija Kocanović	Serbia	10:33.34	17

==== Final B ====
Rank	Rower	Country	Time	Total rank
1	Eline Rol	Switzerland	8:32.59	7
2	Zuzanna Jasińska	Poland	8:37.45	8
3	Chiaki Tomita	Japan	8:40.03	9
4	Ilaria Corazza	Italy	8:43.18	10
5	Maia Emilie Lund	Norway	8:52.88	11
	Olivia Bates	Great Britain	DNS	12

==== Final A ====
Rank	Rower	Country	Time
1st place, gold medalist(s)	Siobhan McCrohan	Ireland	8:47.96
2nd place, silver medalist(s)	Kenia Lechuga	Mexico	8:51.57
3rd place, bronze medalist(s)	Sophia Luwis	United States	8:52.48
4	Martine Veldhuis	Netherlands	9:00.67
5	Aurélie Morizot	France	9:05.06
6	Gianina van Groningen	Romania	9:13.46
