= 2024 World Rowing Championships – Women's lightweight coxless pair =

Women's lightweight coxless pair at the 2024 World Rowing Championships
- Venue: Royal Canadian Henley Rowing Course
- Location: St. Catharines, Canada
- Dates: 20–24 August
- Competitors: 6 from 3 nations
- Teams: 3

Medalists
gold medal	Jessika Sobocinska; Katarzyna Wełna	Poland
silver medal	Alessia Palacios; Valeria Palacios	Peru

The women's lightweight coxless pair competition at the 2024 World Rowing Championships will take place in St. Catharines between 20 and 24 August 2024.

== Schedule ==
The schedule was as follows:

Date	Time	Round
Tuesday 20 August 2024	09:35	Preliminary race
Saturday 24 August 2024	15:16	Final

All times are Eastern Daylight Time (UTC-4)

== Results ==
=== Heat ===
All boats advanced directly to Final.

Rank	Rower	Country	Time	Notes
1	Jessika Sobocinska; Katarzyna Wełna	Poland	8:18.80	F
2	Ciara Stevenson; Anna Currie	Canada	8:26.31	F
3	Alessia Palacios; Valeria Palacios	Peru	9:01.90	F

=== Final ===
The final determined the rankings.

Rank	Rower	Country	Time
1st place, gold medalist(s)	Jessika Sobocinska; Katarzyna Wełna	Poland	7:17.02
2nd place, silver medalist(s)	Alessia Palacios; Valeria Palacios	Peru	7:28.07
3	Ciara Stevenson; Anna Currie	Canada	7:30.88
