= Lucas Verthein =

Brazilian rower (born 1998)

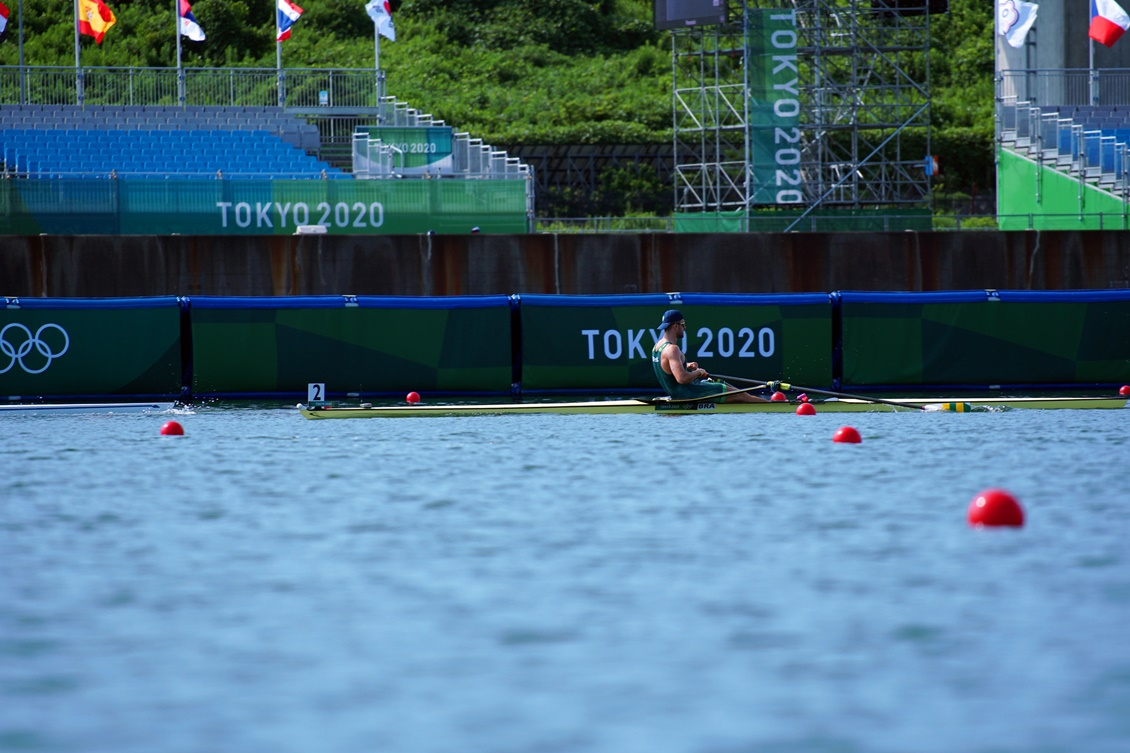
- Verthein at the Tokyo Olympics

Personal information
- Full name: Lucas Verthein Ferreira
- Born: 12 May 1998 (age 28) Rio de Janeiro, Brazil
- Height: 1.90 m (6 ft 3 in)
- Weight: 86 kg (190 lb)

Sport
- Country: Brazil
- Sport: Rowing
Medal record
Men's rowing
Representing Brazil
Pan American Games
Gold medal – first place	2023 Santiago	Single sculls
Bronze medal – third place	2019 Lima	Double sculls
South American Games
Bronze medal – third place	2022 Asunción	M1x
World Rowing Junior Championships
Bronze medal – third place	2016 Rotterdam	JM1x

Lucas Verthein Ferreira (born 12 May 1998) is a Brazilian rower. He reached the semifinals of the 2020 Summer Olympics and won the gold medal at the 2023 Pan American Games.

== Career ==
At the age of 14, invited by a friend, he went to Rodrigo de Freitas Lagoon to watch him train in rowing for Botafogo. He got into one of the rowing boats, became interested in the sport and became a practitioner.

At the 2016 World Rowing Junior Championships in Rotterdam, he won a bronze medal in JM1x.

Verthein participated in the 2017 World Rowing Championships, where he came in 6th place in the D final, finishing in 24th place overall.

At the 2019 Pan American Games, he won a bronze medal in double sculls.

At the 2020 Olympic Games in Tokyo, by qualifying for the semifinals of Men's single sculls, he achieved the best result in Brazil's entire history of Olympic rowing. He finished in 12th place, being the 2nd best rower on the American continent in this race.

At the 2022 South American Games held in Asunción, Paraguay, he obtained a bronze medal in the M1x single skiff event.

In June 2023, he reached the mark of 54 Brazilian titles in Rowing.

He participated in the 2023 World Rowing Championships, reaching the quarterfinals and finishing 14th overall.

At the 2023 Pan American Games held in Santiago, Chile, he won his biggest title by winning the single sculls event. He became the first Brazilian champion in single sculls in the history of the Pan American Games.

At the 2024 Olympic Games in Paris, he reached the quarter-finals and finished 15th overall.
