= Rowing at the 2013 Bolivarian Games =

Rowing (Spanish:Remo), for the 2013 Bolivarian Games, took place from 22 November to 24 November 2013.

== Medal table ==
Key:

* Host nation (Peru)

| Rank | Nation | Gold | Silver | Bronze | Total |
|---|---|---|---|---|---|
| 1 | Chile (CHI) | 6 | 4 | 1 | 11 |
| 2 | Peru (PER)* | 3 | 2 | 3 | 8 |
| 3 | Venezuela (VEN) | 2 | 5 | 2 | 9 |
| 4 | Guatemala (GUA) | 1 | 1 | 1 | 3 |
| 5 | Ecuador (ECU) | 0 | 0 | 1 | 1 |
| 5 | El Salvador (ESA) | 0 | 0 | 1 | 1 |
| 5 | Paraguay (PAR) | 0 | 0 | 1 | 1 |
| Totals (7 entries) | | 12 | 12 | 10 | 34 |

== Medal summary ==
=== Men ===
| Event | Gold | | Silver | | Bronze | |
|---|---|---|---|---|---|---|
| Single sculls | Herman Manriquez Garcia Revolorio (GUA) | 7:10.31 | Emilio Jose Torres (VEN) | 7:15.06 | Eduardo Gabriel Linares Ruiz (PER) | 7:20.99 |
| Lightweight single sculls | Victor Eulogio A. Aspillaga Alayza (PER) | 7:12.88 | Bernardo Enrique Guerrero Diaz (CHI) | 7:15.69 | Leif Ericksen Catalan Flores (GUA) | 7:21.65 |
| Double sculls | Peru; Álvaro Torres; Eduardo Gabriel Linares Ruiz | 6:37.23 | Chile; Max Kevin Grandon Pereira; Carlos Roberto Munnier Gonzalez | 6:41.63 | Venezuela; Cesar Julio Amaris Fernandez; Andre Ricardo Mora Sosa | 6:43.67 |
| Lightweight double sculls | Peru; Victor Eulogio A. Aspillaga Alayza; Renzo Fernando León García | 6:39.84 | Guatemala; Juan Carlos Guevara Gonzalez; Roger Alejandro Alfaro Barranco | 6:43.64 | Chile; Rodrigo Rodolfo Muñoz Santibañez, Nivaldo Yañez Ortiz | 6:44.16 |
| Lightweight quadruple sculls | Chile; Bernardo Enrique Guerrero Diaz; Nelson Andree Martinez Hodde; Rodrigo Rodolfo Muñoz Santibañez; Fabian Andres Oyarzun Zbinden | 6:06.42 | Peru; Johann Gerónimo Hamann Zlatar; Diego Javier Mejía Petersen; Victor Eulogio A. Aspillaga Alayza; Renzo Fernando León García | 6:10.42 | Venezuela; Andre Ricardo Mora Sosa; Agustin Jose Betancourt Mejias; Luis Junior Graterol Loyo; Cesar Julio Amaris Fernandez | 6:13.94 |
| Coxless pair | Chile; Felipe Augusto Leal Atero; Oscar Vasquez Ochoa | 6:52.26 | Venezuela; Jaime Antonio Machado Cabrera; Wilfredo Jose Villa Pineda | 6:56.94 | Peru; Nicolás Ignacio Pezet Duarte; Gonzalo José Del Solar Vargas | 7:27.72 |
| Coxless four | Chile; Luis Sebastian Saumann Salas; Felipe Ignacio Fuentes Villagra; Oscar Vasquez Ochoa; Felipe Augusto Leal Atero | 6:20.25 | Venezuela; Marcos Emilio Diaz Hidrogo; Wilfredo Jose Villa Pineda; Jaime Antonio Machado Cabrera; James Abou Montilla | 6:27.27 | Peru; Mickelle Martini Carreras; Mateo Francisco Pacheco Carrillo; Nicolás Ignacio Pezet Duarte; Gonzalo José Del Solar Vargas | 6:40.58 |
| Coxed eight | Chile; Luis Sebastian Saumann Salas; Felipe Ignacio Fuentes Villagra; Luciano Ignacio Greco Velasquez; Bernardo Enrique Guerrero Diaz; Nivaldo Yañez Ortiz; Fabian Andres Oyarzun Zbinden; Nelson Andree Martinez Hodde; Rodrigo Rodolfo Muñoz Santibañez | 5:56.06 | Venezuela; Jose Andres Fernandez Manrique; Jose Alejandro Fernandez Manrique; Samuel Alexander Lopez; Andre Ricardo Mora Sosa; Agustin Jose Betancourt Mejias; Luis Junior Graterol Loyo; Cesar Julio Amaris Fernandez; Rainner Alberto Castillo | 6:01.72 | Ecuador; Jimmy Ramon Sornoza Moreira; Francisco Javier Mora Rosales; Julio César Arévalo Sánchez; Luis Landy Quinto Sanchez; José Antonio Hernández Quiñonez; Bryan Gabriel Sola Zambrano; Jhon Fabricio Guala Salavarria; Segundo Geovanny Montenegro Cruz; José Junior Peñafiel Navarro | 6:14.11 |

=== Women ===
| Event | Gold | | Silver | | Bronze | |
|---|---|---|---|---|---|---|
| Single sculls | Melita Isidora Abraham Schüssler (CHI) | 8:02.64 | Jenesis Carolina Perez Pastran (VEN) | 8:07.64 | Alejandra Beatriz Alonso Alderete (PAR) | 8:13.86 |
| Lightweight single sculls | Roxieri Eduviges Guerra Cartellin (VEN) | 7:58.87 | Josefa Ignacia Vila Betancur (CHI) | 8:02.09 | Cristina Maria Calidonio Herrera (ESA) | 8:09.14 |
| Double sculls | Chile; Antonia Abraham Schussler; Melita Isidora Abraham Schüssler | 7:20.38 | Peru; Claudia Caballero Larco; Camila Lucero Valle Granados | 7:30.99 | Not awarded | n/a |
| Lightweight double sculls | Venezuela; Roxieri Eduviges Guerra Cartellin; Jenesis Carolina Perez Pastran | 7:25.32 | Chile; Romina Alarcon; Josefa Ignacia Vila Betancur | 7:28.67 | Not awarded | n/a |
