= Siobhan McCrohan =

Irish rower (born 1987)

Personal information
- Nationality: Irish
- Born: 29 June 1987 (age 39) Claregalway, Ireland

Sport
- Country: Ireland
- Sport: Rowing
Medal record
World Championships
Gold medal – first place	2023 Belgrade	Lwt single sculls
Bronze medal – third place	2024 St. Catharines	Lwt single sculls

Siobhan McCrohan (born 29 June 1987) is an Irish rower. She won the Women's Lightweight Individual Sculls at the 2023 Rowing World Championships in Belgrade in September 2023. An engineering graduate of the University of Limerick, McCrohan is a member of the Tribesmen Rowing Club.
