= Javier Insfrán =

Paraguayan rower (born 1999)

Personal information
- Nationality: Paraguayan
- Born: 18 September 1999 (age 26)

Sport
- Sport: Rowing
- Event: Single sculls
Medal record
Men's rowing
Representing Paraguay
South American Games
Silver medal – second place	2022 Asuncion	Single scull

Javier Insfrán (born 18 September 1999) is a Paraguayan rower. He won a silver medal at the 2022 South American Games and competed at the 2024 Olympic Games in Paris.

== Career ==
He is based in Rio de Janeiro, at the Botafogo Club.

He won the 2021 Junior Pan American Games held in Cali, Colombia. He also won gold at the 2022 Bolivarian Games in Valledupar. Competing at the 2022 South American Games in Asunción, he won a silver medal in the men's single sculls.

In March 2024, he earn qualification for the 2024 Summer Games with his performance at the South American qualifiers in Rio de Janeiro. Competing at the 2024 Paris Olympics, he reached the quarter finals of the men's single sculls via the repechage despite initially finishing last in his first qualifying heat.
