= Gabriela Mosqueira =

Paraguayan rower (born 1990)

Personal information
- Full name: Gabriela Mosqueira Benitez
- Nationality: Paraguay
- Born: 5 April 1990 (age 36)
- Height: 162 cm (5.31 ft)
- Weight: 60 kg (130 lb)

Sport
- Sport: Rowing
Medal record
Women's Rowing
Representing Paraguay
South American Games
Silver medal – second place	2010 Medellín	Lightweight Single Sculls
- Updated on 20 September 2012

Gabriela Mosqueira Benítez (born 5 April 1990, Asunción) is a Paraguayan rower. She competed in the single sculls race at the 2012 Summer Olympics and placed 2nd in Final D and 20th overall. She competed in the same event at the 2016 Summer Olympics, finishing in 1st in the D Final, 19th overall.
