= Alejandra Alonso =

Paraguayan rower (born 1996)

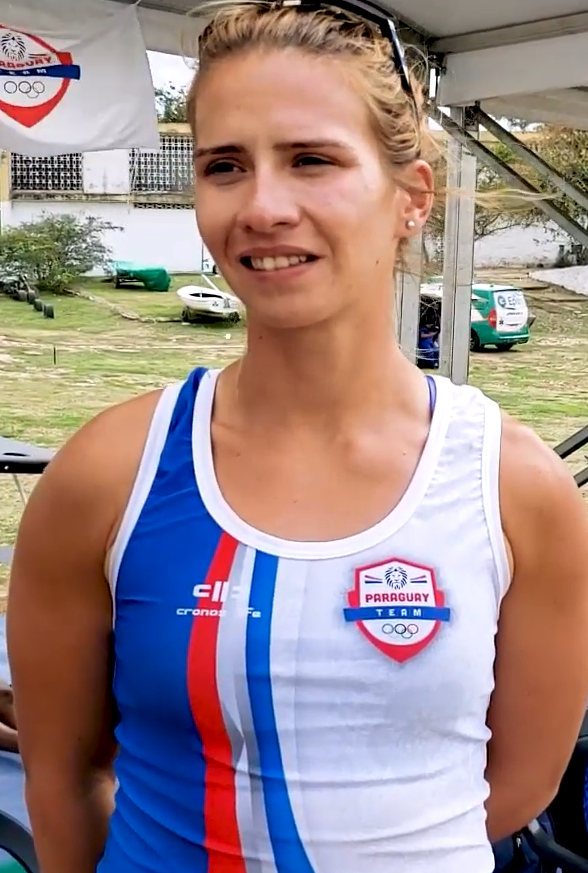
- Alonso in 2022

Personal information
- Full name: Alejandra Beatriz Alonso Alderete
- Nationality: Paraguay
- Born: 1 October 1996 (age 29) Asunción, Paraguay
- Height: 174 cm (5 ft 9 in)
- Weight: 68 kg (150 lb)

Sport
- Sport: Rowing
- Event: Women's Singles
- College team: Barry University
- Club: Yacht & Golf Club Paraguayo

Alejandra Beatriz Alonso Aldrete (born 1 October 1996) is a Paraguayan rower who has represented her country in international competitions. She competed in the 2020 Summer Olympics and the 2024 Summer Olympics.

Olympic Games
Preceded by Fabrizio Zanotti & Verónica Cepede	Flagbearer for Paraguay (with Fabrizio Zanotti); Paris 2024	Succeeded by Incumbent
