= Josefa Vila =

Chilean rower (born 1997)

Josefa Vila Betancur
Personal information
- Born: 6 February 1997 (age 29) Concepción, Chile

Sport
- Sport: Rowing

Josefa Vila Betancur (born 6 February 1997) is a Chilean rower. She competed in the women's lightweight double sculls event at the 2016 Summer Olympics. Vila is a business engineering student at the Federico Santa María Technical University in Valparaíso.
