= Alessia Palacios =

Peruvian rower (born 2000)

Personal information
- Full name: Alessia Ariane Palacios Carrillo
- Born: 6 July 2000 (age 25) San Borja, Lima, Peru

Sport
- Sport: Rowing
- Event: Lightweight double sculls
- Team: Regatas Universitario
Medal record
Women's rowing
Representing Peru
World Championships
Silver medal – second place	2024 St. Catharines	Lwt coxless pair
Bronze medal – third place	2025 Shanghai	Lwt double sculls
World U23 Championships
Silver medal – second place	2022 Varese	Lwt coxless pair

Alessia Ariane Palacios Carrillo (Note: In this Spanish name, the first or paternal surname is Palacios and the second or maternal family name is Carrillo.) (born 6 July 2000) is a Peruvian rower. She qualified for the 2024 Summer Olympics in the lightweight double sculls.

== Early and personal life ==
Her twin sister Valeria Palacios is also a rower. The twins race for Regatas Universitario rowing club.

== Career ==
She competed alongside her sister Valeria and was a silver medalist in the lightweight coxless pair at the 2022 World Rowing U23 Championships in Italy, The pair went on to win gold at the 2022 Bolivarian Games in Colombia in the lightweight double sculls.

Competing at the Americas Olympic and Paralympic qualification regatta in Rio de Janeiro, Brazil in March 2024 alongside her sister Valeria, she qualified for the lightweight double sculls at the 2024 Paris Olympics.
