= Isidora Niemeyer =

Chilean rower (born 2001)

Personal information
- Full name: Isidora Niemeyer Walbaum
- Born: 26 December 2001 (age 24)

Sport
- Country: Chile
Medal record
Pan American Games
| Gold medal – first place | 2019 Lima | Quadruple sculls |
| Gold medal – first place | 2023 Santiago | Lightweight double sculls |
| Silver medal – second place | 2019 Lima | Lightweight Double Sculls |
| Bronze medal – third place | 2023 Santiago | Eight |

Isidora Niemeyer Walbaum (born 26 December 2001) is a Chilean rower.

Niemeyer competed at the Pan American Games in 2019, where she won a gold medal in the Women's Quadruple sculls event and a silver medal in the Lightweight Women's Double Sculls event, and in 2023, winning a gold medal in the lightweight double sculls event and a bronze medal in the eight event. She also competed at the 2018 Youth Olympics.
