= Valeria Palacios (rower) =

Peruvian rower (born 2000)

Personal information
- Nationality: Peruvian
- Born: 6 July 2000 (age 25)

Sport
- Sport: Rowing
- Event: Lightweight double sculls
- Team: Regatas Universitario
Medal record
Women's rowing
Representing Peru
World Championships
Silver medal – second place	2024 St. Catharines	Lwt coxless pair
Bronze medal – third place	2025 Shanghai	Lwt double sculls
World U23 Championships
Silver medal – second place	2022 Varese	Lwt coxless pair

Valeria Palacios (born 6 July 2000) is a Peruvian rower. She qualified in the lightweight double sculls for the 2024 Summer Olympics.

== Early and personal life ==
Her sister Alessia Palacios is also a rower. Both twins race for Regatas Universitario rowing club.

== Career ==
She was a silver medalist in the lightweight coxless pair at the 2022 World Rowing U23 Championships in Italy, alongside her sister. That year, they then won gold at the 2022 Bolivarian Games in Colombia in the same discipline.

Competing alongside her sister Alessia at the Americas Olympic and Paralympic qualification regatta in Rio de Janeiro, Brazil in March 2024, she qualified for the 2024 Paris Olympics in the lightweight double sculls.
