= Álvaro Torres (rower) =

Peruvian rower (born 1993)

Personal information
- Full name: Álvaro Torres Masías
- Nationality: Peru
- Born: 11 June 1993 (age 32) Lima
- Height: 1.80 m (5 ft 11 in)

Sport
- Sport: Rowing

Álvaro Torres Masías (born 11 June 1993) is a Peruvian rower. He competed in the 2020 Summer Olympics. He also represented Peru at the 2019 Pan American Games finishing 5th in the double sculls final alongside Geronimo Hamann.
