= Reina Volcan =

Dominican professional wrestler

Personal information
- Born: Nicole Ripoll-Martinez; January 28, 1997 (age 29) Santiago de los Caballeros, Dominican Republic
- Education: Florida Atlantic University

Professional wrestling career
- Ring names: Nikki Blackheart; Martinez; Reina Volcan
- Trained by: Gangrel
- Debut: June 21, 2024

Nicole Ripoll-Martinez (born January 28, 1997) is a Dominican professional wrestler signed to WWE, where she performs on the NXT brand under the ring name Reina Volcan. She previously competed on the independent circuit under the ring name Nikki Blackheart.

== Early life ==
Ripoll-Martinez was born in Santiago de los Caballeros in the Dominican Republic and raised in Puerto Plata. She moved to the United States when she was 12 years old. She attended Florida Atlantic University. Prior to becoming a professional wrestler, she worked as a cheerleader for the Florida Panthers of the National Hockey League.

== Professional wrestling career ==
=== Independent circuit (2024–2026) ===
Ripoll-Martinez first gained an interest in professional wrestling upon attending WrestleMania 39 with friends in April 2023. She trained under veteran professional wrestler Gangrel at the Coastal Championship Wrestling (CCW) professional wrestling school in Pompano Beach, Florida, who encouraged her to adopt the ring name Nikki Blackheart, inspired by his former tag team the Blackhearts in Japan.

She debuted on June 21, 2024, primarily competing for CCW. She also made appearances on independent events co-promoted with Lucha Libre AAA Worldwide in Mexico.

In early 2026, Blackheart captured the Metroplex Wrestling MPX Women's Championship by defeating Abadon. She lost the title the following month to Priscilla Kelly.

=== WWE (2026–present) ===
In early 2026, Blackheart attended a WWE try-out after being endorsed by Bayley, who publicly stated that she believed Blackheart would fit well in WWE. Blackheart later recalled learning she had earned the try-out "in the craziest way." Following her try-out, Ripoll-Martinez signed with WWE and relocated to Orlando, Florida to begin training at the WWE Performance Center.

Ripoll-Martinez made her first appearance for WWE in a dark match before the May 19, 2026 episode of WWE NXT, defeating Skylar Raye under the ring name Martinez. She made her televised debut on the June 30, 2026 episode of NXT, appearing as a mystery attacker who assaulted Tatum Paxley following Paxley's match. On July 7, 2026, she revealed that her WWE ring name would be Reina Volcan.

== Professional wrestling style and persona ==
Ripoll-Martinez's signature moves are the Argentine backbreaker rack, gorilla press drop, and the "Blackheart Bomb" (a sit-out powerbomb).

== Personal life ==
Ripoll-Martinez trained under Gangrel before entering professional wrestling. She has credited Bayley's Lodestone women's wrestling camp with helping elevate her profile prior to signing with WWE.

== Championships and accomplishments ==
- Coastal Championship Wrestling
  - CCW Women's Championship (1 time)
- Metroplex Wrestling
  - MPX Women's Championship (1 time)
