= Adriana Sanguineti =

Peruvian rower (born 2000)

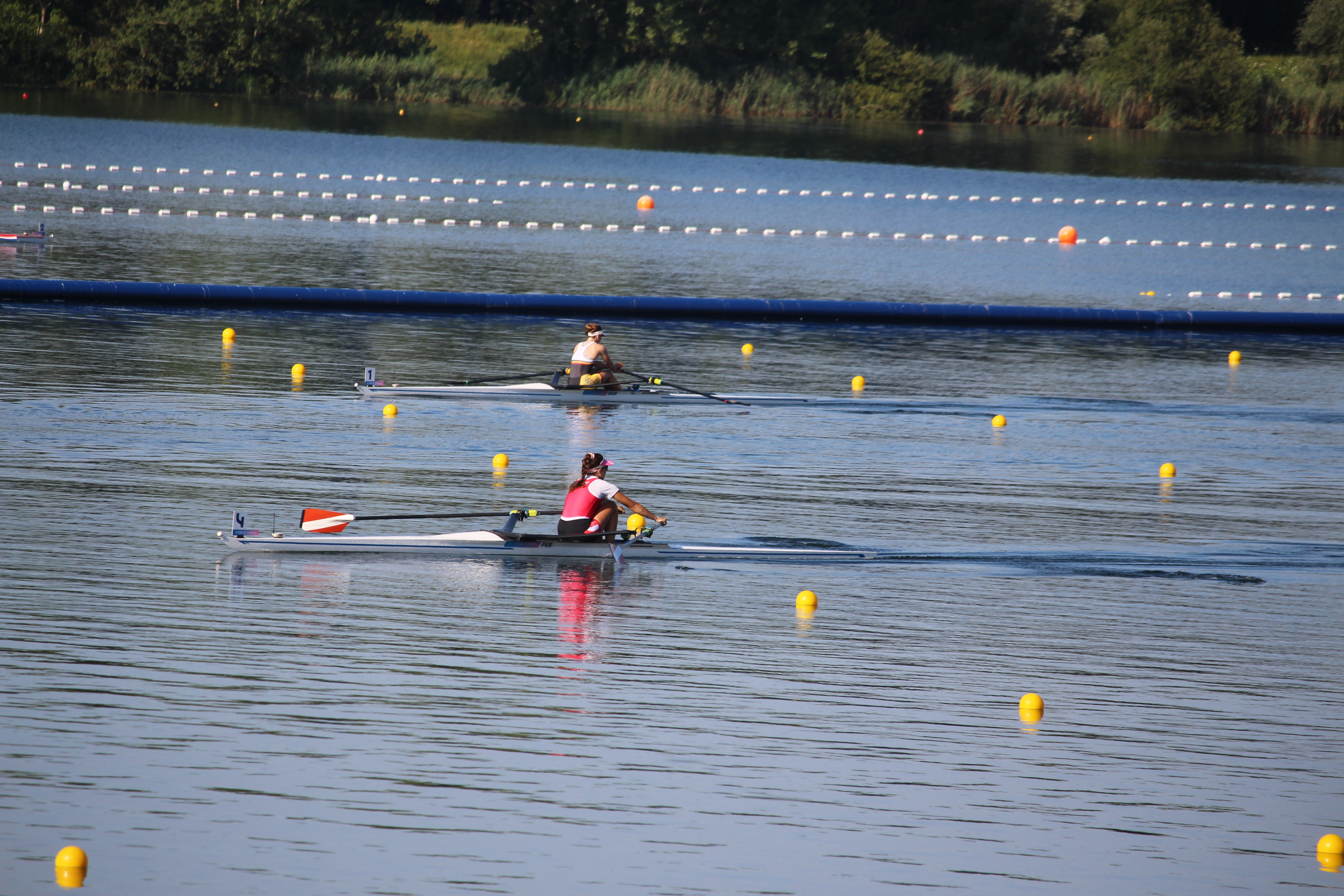

Personal information
- Nationality: Peruvian
- Born: 2 May 2000 (age 26)

Sport
- Sport: Rowing
- Event: Single sculls
- Team: Club de Regatas Lima

Adriana Sanguineti (born 2 May 2000) is a Peruvian rower who competed in the single sculls at the 2024 Summer Olympics.

== Early life ==
She started rowing at the age of twelve years-old. She has a degree in industrial engineering.

== Career ==
Sanguineti races for Club de Regatas Lima in Peru, one of ten oldest rowing clubs in South America. Competing at the Americas Olympic and Paralympic qualification regatta in Rio de Janeiro, Brazil in March 2024, she qualified for the singles sculls at the 2024 Paris Olympics.
