= Fencing at the 2023 Pan American Games – Qualification =

The following is the qualification system and qualified countries for the Fencing at the 2023 Pan American Games competitions.

== Qualification system ==
Up to 162 fencers will qualify to compete, with a minimum of 156. Each nation may enter a maximum of 18 athletes (nine per gender), unless they qualified an athlete via the Cali 2021 Junior Pan American Games. The gold medalists in the individual events of Cali 2021 received a nominal place for the Santiago 2023 Pan American Games. If the athletes who qualified at the Cali 2021 Junior Pan American Games do not participate in the Santiago 2023 Pan American Games, said place will be forfeited and cannot be transferred to another NOC or athlete. The top seven teams at the 2022 Pan American Championships, along with the top two individuals not qualified through the team event will qualify for each respective discipline per gender. The host nation, Chile, automatically qualifies the maximum number of fencers (18). A maximum of two athletes from one NOC can enter the individual events. Only the winning countries in Cali will have the advantage of competing with 3 fencers in the individual event in case of having qualified for Santiago 2023 with the team of their respective weapon.

== Qualification timeline ==
| Event | Date | Venue |
|---|---|---|
| 2021 Junior Pan American Games | December 3–5 | (Colombia) Cali |
| 2022 Pan American Fencing Championships | June 3–8 | (Paraguay) Asunción |

== Qualification summary ==
A total of 16 NOC's qualified fencers.

| NOC | Men | | | | | | Women | | | | | | Total |
| NOC | I. épée | T. épée | I. foil | T. foil | I. sabre | T. sabre | I. épée | T. épée | I. foil | T. foil | I. sabre | T. sabre | Total |
|---|---|---|---|---|---|---|---|---|---|---|---|---|---|
| Argentina | 2 | X | 3 | X | 2 | X | 2 | X | 2 | X | 3 | X | 20 |
| Brazil | 2 | X | 2 | X | 2 | X | 3 | X | 2 | X | 2 | X | 19 |
| Canada | 2 | X | 2 | X | 2 | X | 2 | X | 2 | X | 2 | X | 18 |
| Chile | 3 | X | 2 | X | 2 | X | 2 | X | 3 | X | 2 | X | 20 |
| Colombia | 2 | X | 2 | X | 2 | X | 2 | X | 2 | X | 2 | X | 18 |
| Costa Rica | | | | | | | 2 | X | | | | | 3 |
| Cuba | 2 | X | | | | | | | | | 1 | | 4 |
| Ecuador | | | | | | | | | 1 | | | | 1 |
| Mexico | 1 | | 2 | X | 2 | X | 2 | X | 2 | X | 2 | X | 16 |
| Panama | | | | | | | | | | | 1 | | 1 |
| Paraguay | | | | | | | 1 | | | | | | 1 |
| Peru | 1 | | | | | | 1 | | 2 | X | | | 5 |
| Puerto Rico | | | 1 | | 1 | | | | 1 | | | | 3 |
| United States | 2 | X | 2 | X | 2 | X | | | 2 | X | 2 | X | 15 |
| Venezuela | 2 | X | 2 | X | 3 | X | 2 | X | | | 2 | X | 16 |
| Virgin Islands | | | 1 | | 1 | | | | | | | | 2 |
| Total: 16 NOCs | 19 | 8 | 19 | 8 | 19 | 8 | 19 | 8 | 19 | 8 | 19 | 8 | 162 |

== Men ==
=== Épée ===
| Competition | Fencers per NOC | Total | Qualified |
|---|---|---|---|
| Host nation | 3 | 3 | Chile |
| 2021 Junior Pan American Games individual event | 1 | 1 | Chile |
| 2022 Pan American Championship team event | 3 | 21 | Venezuela; Colombia; Argentina; United States; Canada; Cuba; Brazil |
| 2022 Pan American Championship individual event | 1 | 2 | Peru; Mexico |
| Total | | 27 | |

=== Foil ===
| Competition | Fencers per NOC | Total | Qualified |
|---|---|---|---|
| Host nation | 3 | 1 | Chile |
| 2021 Junior Pan American Games individual event | 1 | 1 | Argentina |
| 2022 Pan American Championship team event | 3 | 21 | United States; Canada; Brazil; Argentina; Venezuela; Mexico; Colombia |
| 2022 Pan American Championship individual event | 1 | 2 | Puerto Rico; Virgin Islands |
| Total | | 27 | |

=== Sabre ===
| Competition | Fencers per NOC | Total | Qualified |
|---|---|---|---|
| Host nation | 3 | 3 | Chile |
| 2021 Junior Pan American Games individual event | 1 | 1 | Venezuela |
| 2022 Pan American Championship team event | 3 | 21 | United States; Canada; Colombia; Brazil; Venezuela; Argentina; Mexico |
| 2022 Pan American Championship individual event | 1 | 2 | Virgin Islands; Puerto Rico |
| Total | | 27 | |

== Women ==
=== Épée ===
| Competition | Fencers per NOC | Total | Qualified |
|---|---|---|---|
| Host nation | 3 | 3 | Chile |
| 2021 Junior Pan American Games individual event | 1 | 1 | Brazil |
| 2022 Pan American Championship team event | 3 | 21 | ~~United States~~; Venezuela; Canada; Argentina; Mexico; Brazil; Colombia; Costa Rica |
| 2022 Pan American Championship individual event | 1 | 2 | Paraguay; Peru |
| Total | | 27 | |

=== Foil ===
| Competition | Fencers per NOC | Total | Qualified |
|---|---|---|---|
| Host nation | 3 | 3 | Chile |
| 2021 Junior Pan American Games individual event | 1 | 1 | Chile |
| 2022 Pan American Championship team event | 3 | 21 | Canada; United States; Brazil; Mexico; Colombia; Argentina; Peru |
| 2022 Pan American Championship individual event | 1 | 2 | Ecuador; Puerto Rico |
| Total | | 27 | |

=== Sabre ===
| Competition | Fencers per NOC | Total | Qualified |
|---|---|---|---|
| Host nation | 3 | 3 | Chile |
| 2021 Junior Pan American Games individual event | 1 | 1 | Argentina |
| 2022 Pan American Championship team event | 3 | 21 | United States; Canada; Brazil; Venezuela; Mexico; Argentina; Colombia |
| 2022 Pan American Championship individual event | 1 | 2 | Cuba; Panama |
| Total | | 27 | |
