= Sport climbing at the 2023 Pan American Games – Qualification =

The following is the qualification system for the competition climbing events at the 2023 Pan American Games and qualified quotas.

== Qualification system ==
A country can qualify a maximum of three athletes per event, for a total of 12 (six men and six women). The world rankings of August 12, 2023, will assign all the quotas. The host nation Chile is guaranteed one athlete per event (four in total, two per gender).

Leftover spots were reallocated through the 2023 IFSC Climbing World Championships held in Bern, Switzerland.

== Qualification summary ==
A total of 11 countries qualified competition climbers.

Nation	Speed		Boulder & Lead		Total
Nation	Men	Women	Men	Women	Athletes
Argentina	1		2	3	6
Brazil	1		3	3	7
Canada	3	1	3	3	10
Chile	2	2	3	3	10
Ecuador	3	3			6
Guatemala	1				1
Mexico	1	3	3	2	9
Peru			1	1	2
Puerto Rico				1	1
United States	3	3	3	3	12
Venezuela	1		2	1	4
Total: 11 NOCs	16	12	20	20	68

== Speed ==
Event	Quotas	Men	Women
Host nation	1	Chile	Chile
World rankings	15/11	United States; United States; United States; Ecuador; Canada; Canada; Ecuador; Canada; Venezuela; Ecuador; Chile; Argentina; Mexico; Brazil; Guatemala	United States; United States; Ecuador; United States; Canada; Mexico; Ecuador; Chile; Mexico; Mexico; Ecuador
Total	28	16	12

- Only 12 of 16 quotas were used in the women's speed event.

== Boulder & Lead ==
Event	Quotas	Men	Women
Host nation	1	Chile	Chile
World rankings	14/19	United States; United States; United States; Canada; Canada; Canada; Brazil; Mexico; Peru; Brazil; Mexico; Chile; Argentina; Brazil	United States; United States; United States; Canada; Argentina; Canada; Brazil; Canada; Chile; Brazil; Chile; Brazil; Argentina; Mexico; Venezuela; Puerto Rico; Argentina; Mexico; Peru
Reallocation	5/0	Chile; Mexico; Argentina; Venezuela; Venezuela	—N/a
Total	40	20	20
