= Judo at the 2023 Pan American Games – Qualification =

The following is the qualification system and qualified athletes for the judo at the 2023 Pan American Games competitions.

== Qualification system ==
A total of up to 154 judokas will qualify to compete at the games. One quota per each weight category were directly allocated to the gold medal winners in the Cali 2021 Junior Pan American Games. The top nine athletes (one per NOC) in each weight category's ranking after the four best results among eleven qualification tournaments will qualify along with one spot per category for the host nation, Chile. Each nation can enter a maximum of 14 athletes (seven men and seven women), except for NOCs whose athletes qualified by quota for Cali 2021 and may have a maximum of two athletes in one weight category.

For the team event, a county must qualify at least one athlete in each of the following categories:

- Women 57kg (48 kg, 52 kg, 57 kg)
- Men 73kg (60 kg, 66 kg, 73 kg)
- Women 70kg (57 kg, 63 kg, 70 kg)
- Men 90kg (73 kg, 81 kg, 90 kg)
- Women +70kg (70 kg, 78 kg, +78 kg)
- Men +90kg (90 kg, 100 kg, +100 kg)

== Qualification timeline ==
Events	Date	Venue
2021 Junior Pan American Games	November 26–28, 2021	(Colombia) Cali
2022 Pan American Judo Championships	April 15–16, 2022	(Peru) Lima
Pan American Open	July 9–10, 2022	(Ecuador) Guayaquil
Pan American Open	September 10–11, 2022	(Dominican Republic) Santo Domingo
Pan American Open	September 17–18, 2022	(Peru) Lima
Pan American Open	September 24–25, 2022	(Colombia) Cali
Pan American Open	November 5–6, 2022	(Argentina) Cordoba
Pan American Open	March 18–19, 2023	(Colombia) Medellín
Pan American Open	April 8–9, 2023	(Cuba) Varadero
Pan American Open	April 22–23, 2023	(Dominican Republic) Santo Domingo
Pan American Open	June 3–4, 2023	(Chile) Santiago
Pan American Open	June 10–11, 2023	(Argentina) Cordoba
Pan American Open	July 1–2, 2023	(Ecuador) Guayaquil
Pan American Open	July 8–9, 2023	(Brazil) Salvador
Pan American Open	July 22–23, 2023	(Peru) Lima

== Qualification summary ==
The following is a list of qualified countries and athletes per event.

NOC	Men							Women							Mixed	Total
NOC	-60 kg	-66 kg	-73 kg	-81 kg	-90 kg	-100 kg	+100 kg	-48kg	-52 kg	-57 kg	-63 kg	-70 kg	-78 kg	+78 kg	Team	Total
Argentina		X	X	XX	X	X	X	X	X	X	X	X		X	Yes	13
Brazil	X	X	XX	X	X	XX	X	XX	X	X	X	XX	XX	X	Yes	19
Canada		X	X	X	X	X	X				X		X			8
Chile	X	X	X	X	X	X	X	X	X	X	X	X	X	X	Yes	14
Colombia	X	X	X	X	X	X		X	X	X	X	X	X	X	Yes	13
Costa Rica	X											X				2
Cuba	X	X	X	X	X	X	XX	X	X	X	X	X	X	XX	Yes	16
Dominican Republic		X	X	X	X		X			X	X		X	X	Yes	9
Ecuador	XX	X				X	X	X	X	X	X	X	X			11
Mexico	X	X	X	X	X	X	X	X	X	X	X					11
Nicaragua														X		1
Panama	X								X	X						3
Peru		X	X		X	X		X					X	X		7
Puerto Rico									X			X	X			3
United States	X		X	X	X	X	X	X	X	XX	X	X	X	X	Yes	14
Uruguay				X												1
Venezuela	X	X			X		X	X	X		X	X		X	Yes	9
Total: 17 NOCs	11	11	11	11	11	11	11	11	11	11	11	11	11	11	10	154

== Men ==
=== 60 kg ===
Criteria	Vacancies	Qualified
Host nation	1	Chile
Junior Pan American Games	1	Bryan Garboa (ECU)
Top 9 ranked countries	9	Brazil; Costa Rica; Mexico; Colombia; Cuba; United States; Ecuador; Venezuela; Panama
TOTAL	11	

=== 66 kg ===
Criteria	Vacancies	Qualified
Host nation	1	Chile
Junior Pan American Games	1	Willis Alberto Garcia (VEN)
Top 9 ranked countries	9	Brazil; Peru; Cuba; Ecuador; Colombia; Mexico; Canada; Dominican Republic; Argentina
TOTAL	11	

=== 73 kg ===
Criteria	Vacancies	Qualified
Host nation	1	Chile
Junior Pan American Games	1	Gabriel Falcão (BRA)
Top 9 ranked countries	9	Canada; Peru; Cuba; Mexico; United States; Colombia; Brazil; Argentina; Dominican Republic
TOTAL	11	

=== 81 kg ===
Criteria	Vacancies	Qualified
Host nation	1	Chile
Junior Pan American Games	1	Agustin Nicolas Gil (ARG)
Top 9 ranked countries	9	Dominican Republic; Brazil; Cuba; Uruguay; Argentina; United States; Mexico; Colombia; Canada
TOTAL	11	

=== 90 kg ===
Criteria	Vacancies	Qualified
Host nation	1	Chile
Junior Pan American Games	1	Alexander Knauf (USA)
Top 9 ranked countries	9	Dominican Republic; Cuba; Peru; Colombia; Brazil; Argentina; Canada; Mexico; Venezuela
TOTAL	11	

=== 100 kg ===
Criteria	Vacancies	Qualified
Host nation	1	Chile
Junior Pan American Games	1	Kayo Silva dos Santos (BRA)
Top 9 ranked countries	9	Brazil; Colombia; Canada; Cuba; Peru; United States; Argentina; Mexico; Ecuador
TOTAL	11	

=== +100 kg ===
Criteria	Vacancies	Qualified
Host nation	1	Chile
Junior Pan American Games	1	Omar Cruz (CUB)
Top 9 ranked countries	9	Cuba; Ecuador; Dominican Republic; Brazil; Mexico; Venezuela; Canada; United States; Argentina
TOTAL	11	

== Women ==
=== 48 kg ===
Criteria	Vacancies	Qualified
Host nation	1	Chile
Junior Pan American Games	1	Alexia Nascimento (BRA)
Top 9 ranked countries	9	Brazil; Argentina; Mexico; Peru; United States; Colombia; Cuba; Venezuela; Ecuador
TOTAL	11	

=== 52 kg ===
Criteria	Vacancies	Qualified
Host nation	1	Chile
Junior Pan American Games	1	Fabiola Valentina Diaz (VEN)
Top 9 ranked countries	9	Mexico; Brazil; Cuba; Argentina; Colombia; Panama; Ecuador; Puerto Rico; United States
TOTAL	11	

=== 57 kg ===
Criteria	Vacancies	Qualified
Host nation	1	Chile
Junior Pan American Games	1	Tasha Cancela (USA)
Top 9 ranked countries	9	Brazil; Cuba; Argentina; Dominican Republic; Colombia; United States; Panama; Ecuador; Mexico
TOTAL	11	

=== 63 kg ===
Criteria	Vacancies	Qualified
Host nation	1	Chile
Junior Pan American Games	1	Ariela Sánchez (DOM)
Top 9 ranked countries	9	Brazil; Cuba; Argentina; Mexico; United States; Canada; Colombia; Venezuela; Ecuador
TOTAL	11	

=== 70 kg ===
Criteria	Vacancies	Qualified
Host nation	1	Chile
Junior Pan American Games	1	Luana Oliveira de Carvalho (BRA)
Top 9 ranked countries	9	Ecuador; Venezuela; Puerto Rico; Cuba; Brazil; Colombia; Costa Rica; Argentina; United States
TOTAL	11	

=== 78 kg ===
Criteria	Vacancies	Qualified
Host nation	1	Chile
Junior Pan American Games	1	Eliza Ramos (BRA)
Top 9 ranked countries	9	Dominican Republic; Ecuador; Brazil; Peru; Colombia; Puerto Rico; Canada; United States; Cuba
TOTAL	11	

=== +78 kg ===
Criteria	Vacancies	Qualified
Host nation	1	Chile
Junior Pan American Games	1	Thalia Nariño Castellano (CUB)
Top 9 ranked countries	9	Venezuela; Dominican Republic; Cuba; United States; Brazil; Peru; Colombia; Argentina; Nicaragua
TOTAL	11	
