= Basketball at the 2023 Pan American Games – Women's tournament =

Women's basketball at the 2023 Pan American Games

Tournament details
- Host country: Chile
- City: Santiago
- Dates: 25–29 October, 2023
- Teams: 8 (from 1 confederation)
- Venue(s): 1 (in 1 host city)

Final positions
- Champions: Brazil (5th title)
- Runners-up: Colombia
- Third place: Argentina
- Fourth place: Cuba

The women's basketball tournament at the 2023 Pan American Games was held in Santiago, Chile at the Multisport Complex 1 at the National Stadium Park cluster, from October 25 to 29, 2023. The eight participating teams were divided into two groups of four teams each, with the top two advancing to the knockout stage.

Brazil were the defending Pan American Games gold medalists, and they successfully defended their medal.

== Qualified teams ==
Eight teams qualified for the tournament. The top seven teams at the 2023 FIBA Women's AmeriCup joined host team Chile to complete the eight berths. However, the United States and Canada, the teams that ended the Women's AmeriCup in second and third, respectively, decided not to participate. They were replaced by Mexico and Cuba.

Event	Dates	Location	Quota(s)	Qualified
Host Nation	—	—	1	Chile
2023 FIBA Women's AmeriCup	July 1–9	(Mexico) León	7	Brazil; ~~United States~~; ~~Canada~~; Puerto Rico; Colombia; Venezuela; Argentina; Mexico; Cuba
Total			8	

== Draw ==
The draw was held in Santiago, Chile, on September 22, 2023.

Pot 1	Pot 2	Pot 3	Pot 4
Brazil; Puerto Rico	Colombia; Argentina	Cuba; Venezuela	Mexico; Chile

== Rosters ==
The eight participating teams must name a roster up to 12 players each.

- Argentina (12)
- Brazil (12)
- Chile (12)
- Colombia (12)
- Cuba (12)
- Mexico (12)
- Puerto Rico (12)
- Venezuela (12)

== Competition format ==
In the first round of the competition, teams are divided into two pools of four teams, and play follows a round robin format with each of the teams playing all other teams in the pool once. Teams are awarded two points for a win, and one point for a loss.

Following the completion of the pool games, the top two teams from each pool advance to a single elimination round consisting of two semifinal games, and the bronze and gold medal matches. Losing teams compete in classification matches to determine their ranking in the tournament.

== Preliminary round ==
All times are local (UTC−3).

=== Group A ===
Pos	Team	Pld	W	L	PF	PA	PD	Pts	Qualification
1	Cuba	3	2	1	223	194	+29	5 (Note: Cuba 86–74 Argentina)	Semifinals
2	Argentina	3	2	1	238	232	+6	5	Semifinals
3	Chile (H)	3	1	2	205	215	−10	4 (Note: Chile 86–60 Puerto Rico)	Fifth place game
4	Puerto Rico	3	1	2	207	232	−25	4	Seventh place game

Source: Santiago 2023
(H) Hosts
Notes:

25 October 2023
17:30

Boxscore

Cuba	86–74	Argentina
Scoring by quarter: 24–15, 26–16, 17–15, 19–28
Pts: Montero 17; Rebs: Despaigne 9 Asts: Galindo 7		Pts: Suárez 23; Rebs: D'Agostino 7 Asts: three players 3

Multisport Complex 1, Santiago
Referees: Julio Anaya (PAN), Fernando Cavalcante (BRA), Kelsey Kisilevich (CAN)

25 October 2023
20:00

Boxscore

Chile	86–60	Puerto Rico
Scoring by quarter: 22–20, 28–18, 24–9, 12–13
Pts: three players 13; Rebs: Cortés 8 Asts: Cousiño 7		Pts: Benítez 17; Rebs: Meléndez 7 Asts: Harris 4

Multisport Complex 1, Santiago
Referees: Andrés Bartel (URU), Alan Dos Santos (BRA), Kevin Lei (CAN)

26 October 2023
17:30

Boxscore

Puerto Rico	72–69	Cuba
Scoring by quarter: 10–26, 17–16, 20–16, 25–12
Pts: Rosado 20; Rebs: Quiñones 9 Asts: Meléndez 7		Pts: Armentero 16; Rebs: Claro 9 Asts: three players 3

Multisport Complex 1, Santiago
Referees: Julio Anaya (PAN), Daniel García (VEN), Orlando Varela (HON)

26 October 2023
20:00

Boxscore

Argentina	87–71	Chile
Scoring by quarter: 15–20, 25–20, 18–14, 29–17
Pts: Gentinetta 23; Rebs: Gentinetta 11; Asts: Suárez 7		Pts: Carrasco, Ovalle 13; Rebs: Ovalle 5 Asts: García 5

Multisport Complex 1, Santiago
Referees: Carlos Vélez (COL), Kristian Páez (ECU), Krishna Domínguez (MEX)

27 October 2023
17:30

Boxscore

Puerto Rico	75–77	Argentina
Scoring by quarter: 29–30, 14–17, 16–14, 16–16
Pts: Benítez, Quiñones 21; Rebs: Quiñones 9 Asts: Hilaire 5		Pts: Suárez 22; Rebs: Gentinetta, Jourdheuil 7 Asts: Gentinetta 4

Multisport Complex 1, Santiago
Referees: Daniel García (VEN), Fernando Cavalcante (BRA), Kevin Lei (CAN)

27 October 2023
20:00

Boxscore

Cuba	68–48	Chile
Scoring by quarter: 11–11, 24–16, 10–7, 23–14
Pts: Contreras 22; Rebs: Galindo 10; Asts: Montero 7		Pts: Cousiño 10; Rebs: Cousiño, Gómez 6 Asts: Novión 4

Multisport Complex 1, Santiago
Referees: Alan dos Santos (BRA), Kelsey Kisilevich (CAN), Aline García (URU)

=== Group B ===
Pos	Team	Pld	W	L	PF	PA	PD	Pts	Qualification
1	Brazil	3	3	0	244	158	+86	6	Semifinals
2	Colombia	3	2	1	196	189	+7	5	Semifinals
3	Venezuela	3	1	2	175	232	−57	4	Fifth place game
4	Mexico	3	0	3	173	209	−36	3	Seventh place game

Source: Santiago 2023

25 October 2023
10:30

Boxscore

Brazil	72–54	Mexico
Scoring by quarter: 16–12, 19–16, 21–14, 16–12
Pts: Fausto, Lopes 12; Rebs: de Souza 13; Asts: de Oliveira 4		Pts: Ávila, Luna 9 Rebs: Luna 8 Asts: Ramírez 3

Multisport Complex 1, Santiago
Referees: Roberto Vásquez (PUR), Kristian Páez (ECU), Micaela Prado (ARG)

25 October 2023
13:00

Boxscore

Colombia	73–57	Venezuela
Scoring by quarter: 23–15, 12–17, 12–6, 26–19
Pts: Paz 27; Rebs: Paz 8 Asts: Muñoz 4		Pts: Corrales 12; Rebs: Corrales 7 Asts: Durán, Márquez 3

Multisport Complex 1, Santiago
Referees: Leonardo Zalazar (ARG), Carmelo de la Rosa (PUR), Aline García (URU)

26 October 2023
10:30

Boxscore

Venezuela	47–94	Brazil
Scoring by quarter: 21–16, 5–31, 5–28, 16–19
Pts: Durán 11; Rebs: Corrales 5 Asts: Rivera 3		Pts: de Souza 14; Rebs: de Souza 9 Asts: Zabani 7

Multisport Complex 1, Santiago
Referees: Micaela Prado (ARG), Aline García (URU), Kelsey Kisilevich (CAN)

26 October 2023
13:00

Boxscore

Mexico	54–66	Colombia
Scoring by quarter: 16–18, 12–12, 16–18, 10–18
Pts: Luna 13; Rebs: Luna 9 Asts: Beltrán 4		Pts: Muñoz 26; Rebs: Paz 8 Asts: Ríos 5

Multisport Complex 1, Santiago
Referees: Andrés Bartel (URU), Carmelo de la Rosa (PUR), Felipe Ibarra (CHI)

27 October 2023
10:30

Boxscore

Brazil	78–57	Colombia
Scoring by quarter: 22–23, 19–8, 11–16, 26–10
Pts: de Souza 14; Rebs: de Souza 8 Asts: dos Santos 8		Pts: Ríos 16; Rebs: Ríos 7 Asts: Muñoz, Ríos 3

Multisport Complex 1, Santiago
Referees: Julio Anaya (PAN), Kristian Páez (ECU), Orlando Varela (HON)

27 October 2023
13:00

Boxscore

Venezuela	71–65	Mexico
Scoring by quarter: 24–15, 8–16, 14–17, 25–17
Pts: Durán 22; Rebs: Fajardo 16; Asts: Durán, Pérez 6		Pts: Ramírez 13; Rebs: Lara 7 Asts: Ramírez 5

Multisport Complex 1, Santiago
Referees: Leonardo Zalazar (ARG), Felipe Ibarra (CHI), Carmelo de la Rosa (PUR)

== Classification games ==
=== Seventh place game ===
28 October 2023
10:30

Boxscore

Puerto Rico	75–70	Mexico
Scoring by quarter: 13–22, 17–17, 22–19, 23–12
Pts: Rosado 21; Rebs: Roma 8 Asts: Rosado 4		Pts: Lara 17; Rebs: Ramos 7 Asts: Ramírez 4

Multisport Complex 1, Santiago
Referees: Leonardo Zalazar (ARG), Tiago dos Santos (BRA), Orlando Varela (HON)

=== Fifth place game ===
28 October 2023
13:00

Boxscore

Chile	70–79	Venezuela
Scoring by quarter: 20–16, 17–17, 18–20, 23–18
Pts: García, Ovalle 12; Rebs: Gómez 9 Asts: García 5		Pts: Durán 22; Rebs: Urbina 9 Asts: Urbina 6

Multisport Complex 1, Santiago
Referees: Carlos Vélez (COL), Micaela Prado (ARG), Fernando Cavalcante (BRA)

== Knockout round ==
Semifinals
October 28
Cuba	48
Colombia	73
October 28
Brazil	77
Argentina	57

Gold medal game
October 29
Colombia	40
Brazil	50
Bronze medal game
October 29
Cuba	66
Argentina	75

=== Semifinals ===
28 October 2023
17:30

Boxscore

Cuba	48–73	Colombia
Scoring by quarter: 16–17, 12–28, 10–12, 10–16
Pts: Despaigne 11; Rebs: Despaigne 12; Asts: Montero 3		Pts: López 15; Rebs: Arias, Vente 6 Asts: Ríos 8

Multisport Complex 1, Santiago
Referees: Daniel García (VEN), Krishna Domínguez (MEX), Felipe Ibarra (CHI)

28 October 2023
20:00

Boxscore

Brazil	77–57	Argentina
Scoring by quarter: 27–17, 15–18, 19–11, 16–11
Pts: Zabani 19; Rebs: Fausto 13; Asts: Darrigo, Zabani 4		Pts: Gauna 14; Rebs: three players 5 Asts: Fernández, Suárez 3

Multisport Complex 1, Santiago
Referees: Luis Vázquez (PUR), Andrés Bartel (URU), Kevin Lei (CAN)

=== Bronze medal game ===
29 October 2023
17:00

Boxscore

Cuba	66–75	Argentina
Scoring by quarter: 12–23, 18–16, 16–19, 20–17
Pts: Galindo 27; Rebs: Contreras 8 Asts: Armentero, Montero 3		Pts: Suárez 27; Rebs: Gauna, Gentinetta 11; Asts: Gauna 5

Multisport Complex 1, Santiago
Referees: Alan dos Santos (BRA), Carmelo de la Rosa (PUR), Aline García (URU)

=== Gold medal game ===
29 October 2023
20:00

Boxscore

Colombia	40–50	Brazil
Scoring by quarter: 15–23, 8–9, 6–6, 11–12
Pts: Delgado 15; Rebs: Paz 14; Asts: Ríos 5		Pts: de Souza 13; Rebs: de Souza 12; Asts: dos Santos 4

Multisport Complex 1, Santiago
Referees: Daniel García (VEN), Kelsey Kisilevich (CAN), Orlando Varela (HON)

== Final standings ==
Rank	Team	Record
1st place, gold medalist(s)	Brazil	5–0
2nd place, silver medalist(s)	Colombia	3–2
3rd place, bronze medalist(s)	Argentina	3–2
4	Cuba	2–3
5	Venezuela	2–2
6	Chile	1–3
7	Puerto Rico	2–2
8	Mexico	0–4
