= Swimming at the 2023 Pan American Games – Men's marathon 10 kilometres =

Men's marathon 10 kilometres at the 2023 Pan American Games
- Venue: Laguna Los Morros
- Date: October 29, 2023
- Competitors: 21 from 14 nations
- Winning time: 1:50:23.4

Medalists
Gold medal	Brennan Gravley	United States
Silver medal	Franco Cassino	Argentina
Bronze medal	Paulo Strehlke	Mexico

The men's marathon 10 kilometres competition of the swimming events at the 2023 Pan American Games was held on October 29, 2023, at the Laguna Los Morros in Santiago, Chile.

== Schedule ==
Date	Time	Round
October 29, 2023	14:40	Final

== Results ==
KEY:	GR	Games record	NR	National record	PB	Personal best	SB	Seasonal best

Rank	Name	Nationality	Time	Notes
1st place, gold medalist(s)	Brennan Gravley	United States	1:50:23.4	
2nd place, silver medalist(s)	Franco Cassino	Argentina	1:50:23.6	
3rd place, bronze medalist(s)	Paulo Strehlke	Mexico	1:50:23.8	
4	Dylan Gravley	United States	1:50:26.8	
5	Joaquín Moreno	Argentina	1:50:34.4	
6	Esteban Enderica	Ecuador	1:50:39.3	
7	David Farinango	Ecuador	1:50:40.6	
8	Diego Vera	Venezuela	1:50:40.7	
9	Daniel Delgadillo	Mexico	1:50:41.0	
10	Juan Morales	Colombia	1:50:41.0	
11	Johndry Segovia	Venezuela	1:51:44.2	
12	Benjamin Côte	Canada	1:52:18.7	
13	Christian Bayo	Puerto Rico	1:53:28.7	
14	Diego Dulieu	Honduras	1:53:30.8	
15	Rodolfo Falcón Jr.	Cuba	1:54:37.8	
16	Eric Hedlin	Canada	1:55:22.8	
17	Jamarr Bruno	Puerto Rico	1:56:10.6	
18	Jeison Rojas	Costa Rica	2:03:28.8	
19	Edhy Vargas	Chile	2:06:02.5	
20	José Santiago Reyes	Independent Athletes Team	2:06:05.9	
21	Juan Diego Nuñez	Dominican Republic	2:06:15.2	
