= Diving at the 2023 Pan American Games – Men's 10 metre platform =

Men's 10 metre springboard at the 2023 Pan American Games
- Venue: Aquatics Centre
- Dates: October 25
- Competitors: 15 from 10 nations
- Winning score: 479.40

Medalists
Gold medal	Randal Willars	Mexico
Silver medal	Nathan Zsombor-Murray	Canada
Bronze medal	Kenny Zamudio	Mexico

The men's 10 metre springboard competition of the diving events at the 2023 Pan American Games was held on October 25 at the Aquatics Centre in Santiago, Chile. A total of 16 divers from 10 countries took part.

== Qualification ==
A total of up to 80 divers (40 per gender) across all events qualified to compete. A nation may enter a maximum of 10 divers (if entering teams in synchronized diving) or 6 athletes (if not entering teams in synchronized diving), with the exception of the winners of the 2021 Junior Pan American Games, provided that these athletes participate only in the event in which they qualified in Cali. The host nation (Chile) automatically qualified a full team of 10 athletes (five per gender). The top 18 men and women in individual events in the 2022 and 2023 FINA World Championships will secure spots for their NOCs. In addition, at each of the CONSANAT Championships (Zone 1) and the PAQ Qualifying Diving Championships (Zone 2), divers from federations competing in such events may earn a quota position for their NOCs provided that the total number of divers from such Zones do not exceed 24 divers on all boards (including those who are ranked in FINA from such competing federations but excluding any divers from CHI). Zone 3 and 4 divers do not have separate qualifiers within their zones. National championships or trials events in Zones 3 and 4 may be used to name divers to already qualified positions.

== Schedule ==
Date	Time	Round
October 25, 2023	11:00	Preliminary
October 25, 2023	20:40	Final

== Results ==
Green denotes finalists

Rank	Diver	Nationality	Preliminary		Final	
Rank	Diver	Nationality	Points	Rank	Points	Rank
1st place, gold medalist(s)	Randal Willars	Mexico	466.45	1	479.40	1
2nd place, silver medalist(s)	Nathan Zsombor-Murray	Canada	422.40	3	476.15	2
3rd place, bronze medalist(s)	Kenny Zamudio	Mexico	430.50	2	451.60	3
4	Rylan Wiens	Canada	367.65	7	449.15	4
5	Carlos Ramos	Cuba	408.60	4	443.10	5
6	Isaac Souza	Brazil	391.80	6	407.15	6
7	Sebastián Villa	Colombia	403.20	5	406.10	7
8	Alejandro Solarte	Colombia	357.40	10	398.30	8
9	Jordan Rzerpka	United States	363.75	8	391.05	9
10	Emanuel Vazquez	Puerto Rico	361.55	9	360.70	10
11	Santiago Choez	Ecuador	326.15	12	329.80	11
12	Jesús Gonzalez	Venezuela	334.25	11	316.30	12
13	Max Flory	United States	324.95	13	Did not advance	
—	Diogo Silva	Brazil	Did not start			
