= Weightlifting at the 2023 Pan American Games – Women's 49 kg =

Weightlifting – Women's 49kg at the 2023 Pan American Games
- Venue: Gimnasio Chimkowe
- Dates: 21 October
- Competitors: 12 from 11 nations

Medalists
| Gold medal | Dahiana Ortiz | Dominican Republic |
| Silver medal | Katherin Echandía | Venezuela |
| Bronze medal | Beatriz Pirón | Dominican Republic |

The women's 49 kg competition of the weightlifting events at the 2023 Pan American Games in Santiago, Chile, was held on 21 October at the Gimnasio Chimkowe.

Each lifter performed in both the snatch and clean and jerk lifts, with the final score being the sum of the lifter's best result in each. The athlete received three attempts in each of the two lifts; the score for the lift was the heaviest weight successfully lifted. This weightlifting event was limited to competitors with a maximum of 49 kilograms of body mass.

== Results ==
The results were as follows:

| Rank | Athlete | Nation | Group | Snatch (kg) | | | | Clean & Jerk (kg) | | | | Total |
| Rank | Athlete | Nation | Group | 1 | 2 | 3 | Result | 1 | 2 | 3 | Result | Total |
|---|---|---|---|---|---|---|---|---|---|---|---|---|
| 1st place, gold medalist(s) | Dahiana Ortiz | Dominican Republic | A | 79 | ~~83~~ | 83 | 83 | 101 | 104 | 107 | 107 | 190 |
| 2nd place, silver medalist(s) | Katherin Echandía | Venezuela | A | 79 | 82 | 84 | 84 | 101 | ~~104~~ | 105 | 105 | 189 |
| 3rd place, bronze medalist(s) | Beatriz Pirón | Dominican Republic | A | 80 | 84 | ~~86~~ | 84 | 97 | ~~102~~ | ~~102~~ | 97 | 181 |
| 4 | Amanda Braddock | Canada | A | 70 | 72 | 74 | 74 | 87 | 91 | ~~94~~ | 91 | 165 |
| 5 | Ludmila Gerzel | Argentina | A | 68 | 71 | ~~73~~ | 71 | 86 | 90 | ~~93~~ | 90 | 161 |
| 6 | Katherine Landeros | Chile | A | 66 | 69 | 70 | 70 | 86 | 89 | ~~92~~ | 89 | 159 |
| 7 | Omayraliz Ortíz | Puerto Rico | A | ~~65~~ | 65 | 68 | 68 | 85 | ~~88~~ | 88 | 88 | 156 |
| 8 | Yessica Torrez | Bolivia | A | 63 | ~~66~~ | ~~66~~ | 63 | 86 | 90 | ~~92~~ | 90 | 153 |
| 9 | Silvana González | Independent Athletes Team | A | ~~63~~ | 63 | ~~66~~ | 63 | ~~82~~ | 82 | ~~86~~ | 82 | 145 |
| 10 | Karin Singh | Trinidad and Tobago | A | 43 | 46 | 49 | 49 | 56 | 59 | 62 | 62 | 111 |
| | Shoely Mego | Peru | A | ~~70~~ | ~~70~~ | 78 | 78 | ~~100~~ | ~~100~~ | ~~100~~ | – | – |
| | Yesica Hernández | Mexico | A | ~~77~~ | ~~77~~ | ~~77~~ | – | | | | – | DNS |
