= Judo at the 2023 Pan American Games – Women's 70 kg =

Judo Women's 70 kg at the 2023 Pan American Games
- Venue: Contact Sports Center
- Location: Santiago, Chile
- Date: 29 October
- Competitors: 11 from 10 nations
- Website: Official website

Medalists
| gold medal | Idelannis Gómez (1st title) | Cuba |
| silver medal | María Pérez | Puerto Rico |
| bronze medal | Elvismar Rodríguez | Venezuela |
| bronze medal | Celinda Corozo | Ecuador |

Competition at external databases
- Links: IJF

The women's 70 kg competition of the judo events at the 2023 Pan American Games was held on 29 October at the Contact Sports Center (Centro de Entrenamiento de los Deportes de Contacto) in Santiago, Chile. A total of 11 athletes from 10 NOC's competed.

== Schedule ==
All times are local (UTC−3)

| Date | Time | Event |
|---|---|---|
| Sunday, 29 October 2023 | 10:00 | Elimination round of 16 |
| Sunday, 29 October 2023 | 10:55 | Quarterfinals |
| Sunday, 29 October 2023 | 11:00 | Repechage |
| Sunday, 29 October 2023 | 11:00 | Semifinals |
| Sunday, 29 October 2023 | 15:00 | Finals |

== Results ==
=== Main Bracket ===
Round of 16
Yasmin Alamin (USA) | 00 (yellow card)
Luana Carvalho (BRA) | 10 (yellow card)
Victoria Delvecchio (ARG) | 10
Camila Lagos (CHI) | 00
Katia Castillo (MEX) | 00
Alexia Castilhos (BRA) | 10

Quarter-finals
Celinda Corozo (ECU) | 10
Luana Carvalho (BRA) | 01 (yellow card)
Idelannis Gómez (CUB) | 11
Victoria Delvecchio (ARG) | 00
Elvismar Rodríguez (VEN) | 11
Alexia Castilhos (BRA) | 00 (yellow card)
María Pérez (PUR) | 10
Luisa Bonilla (COL) | 00 (yellow card)

Semi-finals
Celinda Corozo (ECU) | 01
Idelannis Gómez (CUB) | 10
Elvismar Rodríguez (VEN) | 00 (yellow card)
María Pérez (PUR) | 10

Gold medal contest
Idelannis Gómez (CUB) | 10
María Pérez (PUR) | 00 (yellow card)

=== Repechage ===
Repechage
Luana Carvalho (BRA) | 10
Victoria Delvecchio (ARG) | 00 (yellow card)
Alexia Castilhos (BRA) | 10
Luisa Bonilla (COL) | 00 (yellow card)

Bronze medal contests
Luana Carvalho (BRA) | 00
Elvismar Rodríguez (VEN) | 10
Alexia Castilhos (BRA) | 00
Celinda Corozo (ECU) | 10
