= Jacqueline Benítez =

Puerto Rican basketball player

No. 55 – KK Šiauliai
- Position: Guard
- League: LWBL

Personal information
- Born: June 6, 1997 (age 29) Tobyhanna, Pennsylvania, U.S.
- Listed height: 1.78 m (5 ft 10 in)

Career information
- High school: Pocono Mountain West (Pocono Summit, Pennsylvania)
- College: Siena (2015–2017); James Madison (2018–2020)
- WNBA draft: 2020: undrafted
Medals
Women's basketball
Representing Puerto Rico
Central American and Caribbean Games
Bronze medal – third place	2023 San Salvador	Team

Jacqueline Mary Hope Benítez (born June 6, 1997) is a Puerto Rican basketball player for KK Šiauliai and the Puerto Rican national team.

She represented Puerto Rico at the 2020 Summer Olympics.
