= Venezuela at the 2023 Pan American Games =

- IOC code: VEN
- NOC: Venezuelan Olympic Committee
- Website: www.cov.com.ve

in Santiago, Chile 20 October 2023 – 5 November 2023
- Competitors: 285 in 28 sports
- Flag bearers (opening): Keydomar Vallenilla & Joselyn Brea
- Flag bearers (closing): José Díaz & Joselyn Brea
- Medals Ranked 10th: Gold 8 Silver 15 Bronze 21 Total 44

Pan American Games appearances (overview)
- 1951; 1955; 1959; 1963; 1967; 1971; 1975; 1979; 1983; 1987; 1991; 1995; 1999; 2003; 2007; 2011; 2015; 2019; 2023

Venezuela is scheduled to compete at the 2023 Pan American Games in Santiago, Chile from October 20 to November 5, 2023. This will be Venezuela's 19th appearance at the Pan American Games, having competed at every edition of the games since the inaugural edition in 1951.

Weightlifter athlete Keydomar Vallenilla and athlete Joselyn Brea were the country's flagbearers during the opening ceremony. Meanwhile, wrestler José Díaz and Brea were the country's flagbearers during the closing ceremony.

== Competitors ==
The following is the list of number of competitors (per gender) participating at the games per sport/discipline.

Sport	Men	Women	Total
Archery	1	3	4
Athletics	10	6	16
Badminton	1	1	2
Baseball	24	0	24
Basketball	16	16	32
Basque pelota	0	4	4
Bowling	2	2	4
Boxing	5	6	11
Breaking	1	0	1
Canoeing	4	3	7
Cycling	8	9	17
Diving	1	1	2
Equestrian	2	1	3
Fencing	8	6	15
Golf	2	2	4
Gymnastics	2	8	10
Judo	5	4	9
Karate	2	4	6
Modern pentathlon	2	1	3
Roller sports	2	2	4
Rowing	3	5	8
Sailing	3	5	8
Shooting	4	3	7
Softball	0	18	18
Sport climbing	3	1	4
Surfing	2	0	2
Swimming	11	7	18
Table tennis	1	3	4
Taekwondo	3	4	7
Tennis	3	1	4
Triathlon	2	2	4
Weightlifting	4	4	8
Wrestling	10	6	16
Total	147	138	285

== Medalists ==
The following Venezuelan competitors won medals at the games. In the by discipline sections below, medalists' names are bolded.

Medal	Name	Sport	Event	Date
Gold	Julio Mayora	Weightlifting	Men's –73 kg	October 21
Gold	Keydomar Vallenilla	Weightlifting	Men's –89 kg	October 22
Gold	Willis García	Judo	Men's –66 kg	October 28
Gold	Joselyn Brea	Athletics	Women's 5000 metres	November 2
Gold	Joselyn Brea	Athletics	Women's 1500 metres	November 3
Gold	Yorgelis Salazar	Karate	Women's −50 kg	November 4
Gold	José Antonio Maita	Athletics	Men's 800 metres	November 4
Gold	Andrés Madera	Karate	Men's –67 kg	November 5
Silver	Alfonso Mestre	Swimming	Men's 400 metre freestyle	October 21
Silver	Katherin Echandia	Weightlifting	Women's –49 kg	October 21
Silver	Douglas Gómez	Shooting	Men's 25 metre rapid fire pistol	October 22
Silver	Alfonso Mestre	Swimming	Men's 800 metre freestyle	October 23
Silver	Leonel Martínez	Shooting	Men's trap	October 27
Silver	Francisco Bellorín	Surfing	Men's shortboard	October 30
Silver	José Daniel Díaz	Wrestling	Men's freestyle 125 kg	November 1
Silver	Rosa Rodríguez	Athletics	Women's hammer throw	November 1
Silver	Eliecer Romero	Fencing	Men's sabre	November 1
Silver	Soleymi Caraballo	Wrestling	Women's freestyle 68 kg	November 2
Silver	Robeilys Peinado	Athletics	Women's pole vault	November 2
Silver	Cleiver Leocádio	Karate	Men's individual kata	November 3
Silver	Luis Avendaño	Wrestling	Men's Greco-Roman 87 kg	November 4
Silver	Luillys Pérez	Wrestling	Men's Greco-Roman 97 kg	November 4
Silver	Venezuela men's national basketball team: Edwind Mijares; Kender Urbina; Garly Sojo; Elian Centeno; José Ascanio; Miguel Ruiz; Windi Graterol; Yohanner Sifontes; Franger Pirela; Edgar Martínez; Néstor Colmenares; Enrique Medina	Basketball	Men's tournament	November 4
Bronze	Anyelin Venegas	Weightlifting	Women's –59 kg	October 22
Bronze	Jhohan Sanguino	Weightlifting	Men's –102 kg	October 23
Bronze	Alfonso Mestre	Swimming	Men's 1500 metre freestyle	October 25
Bronze	Johana Gómez	Boxing	Women's –54 kg	October 26
Bronze	Omailyn Alcalá	Boxing	Women's –57 kg	October 26
Bronze	Elvismar Rodríguez	Judo	Women's –70 kg	October 29
Bronze	Francisco Limardo	Fencing	Men's épée	October 30
Bronze	Cristian Sarco	Wrestling	Men's freestyle 97 kg	November 1
Bronze	Anthony Montero	Wrestling	Men's freestyle 74 kg	November 1
Bronze	Pedro Ceballos	Wrestling	Men's freestyle 86 kg	November 2
Bronze	Mariana Rojas	Wrestling	Women's freestyle 50 kg	November 2
Bronze	Betzabeth Argüello	Wrestling	Women's freestyle 53 kg	November 3
Bronze	María Acosta	Wrestling	Women's freestyle 76 kg	November 3
Bronze	Raiber Rodríguez	Wrestling	Men's Greco-Roman 60 kg	November 3
Bronze	Andrea Armada	Karate	Women's individual kata	November 3
Bronze	Claudymar Garcés	Karate	Women's −61 kg	November 4
Bronze	Abraham Rodríguez; Eliecer Romero; José Quintero	Fencing	Men's team sabre	November 4
Bronze	Eliana Lugo; Lizze Asis; María Martínez	Fencing	Women's team épée	November 4
Bronze	Moisés Pérez	Wrestling	Men's Greco-Roman 130 kg	November 4
Bronze	Angy Quintero	Roller sports	Women's 1000 m sprint	November 4
Bronze	Katherine Díaz	Cycling	Women's BMX freestyle	November 5

Medals by sport
**Sport**	1st place, gold medalist(s)	2nd place, silver medalist(s)	3rd place, bronze medalist(s)	Total
Athletics	3	2	0	5
Basketball	0	1	0	1
Boxing	0	0	2	2
Cycling	0	0	1	1
Fencing	0	1	3	4
Judo	1	0	1	2
Karate	2	1	2	5
Roller sports	0	0	1	1
Shooting	0	2	0	2
Surfing	0	1	0	1
Swimming	0	2	1	3
Weightlifting	2	1	2	5
Wrestling	0	4	8	12
Total	8	15	21	44

Medals by day
**Day**	**Date**	1st place, gold medalist(s)	2nd place, silver medalist(s)	3rd place, bronze medalist(s)	Total
1	October 21	1	2	0	3
2	October 22	1	1	1	3
3	October 23	0	1	1	2
4	October 24	0	0	0	0
5	October 25	0	0	1	1
6	October 26	0	0	2	2
7	October 27	0	1	0	1
8	October 28	1	0	0	1
9	October 29	0	0	1	1
10	October 30	0	1	1	2
11	October 31	0	0	0	0
12	November 1	0	3	2	5
12	November 2	1	2	2	5
13	November 3	1	1	4	6
14	November 4	2	3	5	10
15	November 5	1	0	1	2
Total		8	15	21	44

Medals by gender
**Gender**	1st place, gold medalist(s)	2nd place, silver medalist(s)	3rd place, bronze medalist(s)	**Total**	**Percentage**
Female	3	4	12	**19**	43.2 %
Male	5	11	9	**25**	56.8 %
Total	8	15	21	44	100%

== Archery ==
Venezuela qualified four archers (one man and three women) during the 2023 Copa Merengue.

Men

Athlete	Event	Ranking Round		Round of 32	Round of 16	Quarterfinals	Semifinals	Final / BM	Rank
Athlete	Event	Score	Seed	Opposition Score	Opposition Score	Opposition Score	Opposition Score	Opposition Score	Rank
Víctor Palacio	Individual recurve	609	30	Grande (MEX); L 2–6	Did not advance				27

Women

Athlete	Event	Ranking Round		Round of 32	Round of 16	Quarterfinals	Semifinals	Final / BM	Rank
Athlete	Event	Score	Seed	Opposition Score	Opposition Score	Opposition Score	Opposition Score	Opposition Score	Rank
Nieves Arango	Individual recurve	615	17	Posada (COL); L 4–6	Did not advance				19
Daniela Chacón	Individual recurve	610	18	dos Santos (BRA); W 6–4	Kaufhold (USA); L 4–6	Did not advance			10
Lisbeth Leoni	Individual recurve	409	32	Valencia (MEX); L 0–6	Did not advance				32
Nieves Arango; Daniela Chacón; Lisbeth Leoni	Team recurve	1634	8	—N/a		Mexico; L 0–6	Did not advance		7

Mixed

Athlete	Event	Ranking Round		Round of 32	Round of 16	Quarterfinals	Semifinals	Final / BM	Rank
Athlete	Event	Score	Seed	Opposition Score	Opposition Score	Opposition Score	Opposition Score	Opposition Score	Rank
Víctor Palacio; Nieves Arango	Team recurve	1224	11	—N/a	Argentina; L 1–5	Did not advance			11

== Athletics ==
Men
Track & road events

Athlete	Event	Semifinals		Final	
Athlete	Event	Time	Rank	Time	Rank
Ryan López	800 m	1:47.22	2 Q	1:48.06	7
José Maita	800 m	1:49.12	2 Q	1:45.69	1st place, gold medalist(s)
José Peña	3000m steeplechase	—N/a		9:17.90	12
Alexis Nieves; Bryant Álamo; David Vivas; Rafael Vásquez; Carlos Belisario	4 × 100 m relay	39.65	4 q	39.81	7
Kelvis Padrino; Julio Rodríguez; Javier Gómez; José Maita; Ryan López; Rafael Vásquez	4 × 400 m relay	—N/a		3:06.04	4

Key: Q=Qualified for next round based on position in heat; q=Qualified for next round as fastest loser; *=Athlete ran in a preliminary round but not the final

Field events

Athlete	Event	Final	
Athlete	Event	Distance	Rank
Leodán Torrealba	Triple jump	16.20	6
Ricardo Montes de Oca	Pole vault	5.10	10

Key: Q=Qualify for final based on position in group; q=Qualify for final based on position in field without meeting qualifying mark

Combined event – Decathlon

Athlete	Event	100 m	LJ	SP	HJ	400 m	110 H	DT	PV	JT	1500 m	Total	Rank
Gerson Izaguirre	Result	11.26	7.48	14.16	1.89	51.92	14.52	40.90	4.50	52.98	5:26.04	7271	7
Gerson Izaguirre	Points	852	930	738	705	728	908	683	760	633	419	7271	7

Women
Track & road events

Athlete	Event	Semifinals		Final	
Athlete	Event	Time	Rank	Time	Rank
Joselyn Brea	1500 m	—N/a		4:11.80	1st place, gold medalist(s)
Joselyn Brea	5000 m	—N/a		16:04.12	1st place, gold medalist(s)
Yoveinny Mota	100 m hurdles	13.39	4 q	13.39	5
Natalia Alfonzo	20 km walk	—N/a			10

Field events

Athlete	Event	Final	
Athlete	Event	Distance	Rank
Robeilys Peinado	Pole vault	4.55	2nd place, silver medalist(s)
Rosa Rodríguez	Hammer throw	71.59	2nd place, silver medalist(s)
Ahymara Espinoza	Shot put	15.97	9

Key: Q=Qualify for final based on position in group; q=Qualify for final based on position in field without meeting qualifying mark

== Badminton ==
Venezuela qualified a team of two athletes (one man and one woman).

Athlete	Event	Round of 32	Round of 16	Quarterfinals	Semifinals	Final / BM	
Athlete	Event	Opposition Result	Opposition Result	Opposition Result	Opposition Result	Opposition Result	Rank
Frank Barrios	Men's singles	Bencomo (CUB); W 2–1	Santos (BRA); L 0–2	Did not advance			
Maria Rojas Camacho	Women's singles	Zhang (USA); L 0–2	Did not advance				
Frank Barrios; Maria Rojas Camacho	Mixed doubles	Medel / Vania (CHI); L 0–2	Did not advance				

== Baseball ==
Venezuela qualified a men's team (of 24 athletes) by finishing third in the 2023 Central American and Caribbean Games.

Summary

Team	Event	Preliminary round				Super Round			Final / BM / Pl.	
Team	Event	Opposition Result	Opposition Result	Opposition Result	Rank	Opposition Result	Opposition Result	Rank	Opposition Result	Rank
Venezuela men	Men's tournament	Brazil; L 1–3	Cuba; W 6–5	Colombia; L 2–6	4	Did not advance			Chile; W 7–0	7

Preliminary round

Pos	Team	Pld	W	L	RF	RA	PCT	GB	Qualification
1	Brazil	3	3	0	15	10	1.000	—	Super Round
2	Colombia	3	1	2	16	14	.333	2	Super Round
3	Cuba	3	1	2	11	13	.333	2	Fifth place game
4	Venezuela	3	1	2	9	14	.333	2	Seventh place game

Source: Santiago 2023 and WBSC Americas

October 19; 15:00	Venezuela	1–3	Brazil	Parque Bicentenario de Cerrillos, Cerrillos
October 19; 15:00		Boxscore		Parque Bicentenario de Cerrillos, Cerrillos

October 22; 15:00	Cuba	5–6	Venezuela	Parque Bicentenario de Cerrillos, Cerrillos
October 22; 15:00		Boxscore		Parque Bicentenario de Cerrillos, Cerrillos

October 24; 15:00	Colombia	6–2	Venezuela	Parque Bicentenario de Cerrillos, Cerrillos
October 24; 15:00		Boxscore		Parque Bicentenario de Cerrillos, Cerrillos

Seventh place game

October 25; 9:30	Chile	0–7	Venezuela	Parque Bicentenario de Cerrillos, Cerrillos
October 25; 9:30		Boxscore		Parque Bicentenario de Cerrillos, Cerrillos

== Basketball ==
Venezuela qualified a men's team (of 12 athletes) by finishing seventh in the 2022 FIBA Americup.

Venezuela qualified a women's team (of 12 athletes) by finishing sixth in the 2023 FIBA Women's AmeriCup.

=== 5x5 ===
==== Men's tournament ====
Summary

Team	Event	Group stage				Semifinal	Final / BM / Pl.	
Team	Event	Opposition Result	Opposition Result	Opposition Result	Rank	Opposition Result	Opposition Result	Rank
Venezuela men	Men's tournament	Argentina; L 88–95	Dominican Republic; W 92–90	Panama; W 77–68	2 Q	Brazil; W 84–77	Argentina; L 65–79	2nd place, silver medalist(s)

Preliminary round

Pos	Team	Pld	W	L	PF	PA	PD	Pts	Qualification
1	Argentina	3	3	0	262	246	+16	6	Semifinals
2	Venezuela	3	2	1	257	253	+4	5	Semifinals
3	Dominican Republic	3	1	2	252	227	+25	4	Fifth place game
4	Panama	3	0	3	198	243	−45	3	Seventh place game

Source: Santiago 2023

31 October 2023
10:30

Boxscore

Argentina	95–88 (OT)	Venezuela
Scoring by quarter: 24–19, 22–11, 17–17, 14–30, Overtime: 18–11
Pts: Scala 23; Rebs: Saiz 10; Asts: Scala 6		Pts: Sojo 22; Rebs: Graterol 10; Asts: Mijares 6

Multisport Complex 1, Santiago
Referees: Jorge Vásquez (PUR), Johnny Batista (PUR), Alan dos Santos (BRA)

1 November 2023
13:00

Boxscore

Venezuela	92–90 (OT)	Dominican Republic
Scoring by quarter: 18–19, 14–19, 30–29, 19–17, Overtime: 11–9
Pts: Colmenares, Sojo 21; Rebs: Sojo 10; Asts: Pirela, Sojo 4		Pts: Pérez 22; Rebs: Guerrero 8 Asts: Dicent, Suero 3

Multisport Complex 1, Santiago
Referees: Luis Vásquez (PUR), Alan dos Santos (BRA), Kevin Lei (CAN)

2 November 2023
13:00

Boxscore

Panama	68–77	Venezuela
Scoring by quarter: 12–16, 29–23, 16–21, 11–17
Pts: Sánchez 23; Rebs: Romero 13; Asts: Hall 4		Pts: Sojo 22; Rebs: Colmenares 18; Asts: Ascanio, Sifontes 3

Multisport Complex 1, Santiago
Referees: Krishna Domínguez (MEX), Carmelo de la Rosa (PUR), Fernando Cavalcante (BRA)

Semifinal

3 November 2023
20:00

Boxscore

Brazil	77–84	Venezuela
Scoring by quarter: 15–25, 22–31, 20–14, 20–14
Pts: Pereira 22; Rebs: Crepaldi 10; Asts: Corazza 8		Pts: Sifontes 22; Rebs: Colmenares, Sojo 7 Asts: Pirela 6

Multisport Complex 1, Santiago
Referees: Luis Vásquez (PUR), Michael Scott (CAN), Carmelo de la Rosa (PUR)

Gold medal game

4 November 2023
20:00

Boxscore

Argentina	79–65	Venezuela
Scoring by quarter: 17–12, 26–22, 27–10, 9–21
Pts: Lugarini 17; Rebs: Saiz 10; Asts: Cuello 4		Pts: Sojo 17; Rebs: Colmenares 10; Asts: Sifontes 3

Multisport Complex 1, Santiago
Referees: Luis Vásquez (PUR), Julio Anaya (PAN), Andrés Bartel (URU)

==== Women's tournament ====
Summary

Team	Event	Group stage				Semifinal	Final / BM / Pl.	
Team	Event	Opposition Result	Opposition Result	Opposition Result	Rank	Opposition Result	Opposition Result	Rank
Venezuela women	Women's tournament	Colombia; L 57–73	Brazil; L 47–97	Mexico; W 71–65	3	Did not advance	Chile; W 79–70	5

Preliminary round

Pos	Team	Pld	W	L	PF	PA	PD	Pts	Qualification
1	Brazil	3	3	0	244	158	+86	6	Semifinals
2	Colombia	3	2	1	196	189	+7	5	Semifinals
3	Venezuela	3	1	2	175	232	−57	4	Fifth place game
4	Mexico	3	0	3	173	209	−36	3	Seventh place game

Source: Santiago 2023

25 October 2023
13:00

Boxscore

Colombia	73–57	Venezuela
Scoring by quarter: 23–15, 12–17, 12–6, 26–19
Pts: Paz 27; Rebs: Paz 8 Asts: Muñoz 4		Pts: Corrales 12; Rebs: Corrales 7 Asts: Durán, Márquez 3

Multisport Complex 1, Santiago
Referees: Leonardo Zalazar (ARG), Carmelo de la Rosa (PUR), Aline García (URU)

26 October 2023
10:30

Boxscore

Venezuela	47–94	Brazil
Scoring by quarter: 21–16, 5–31, 5–28, 16–19
Pts: Durán 11; Rebs: Corrales 5 Asts: Rivera 3		Pts: de Souza 14; Rebs: de Souza 9 Asts: Zabani 7

Multisport Complex 1, Santiago
Referees: Micaela Prado (ARG), Aline García (URU), Kelsey Kisilevich (CAN)

27 October 2023
13:00

Boxscore

Venezuela	71–65	Mexico
Scoring by quarter: 24–15, 8–16, 14–17, 25–17
Pts: Durán 22; Rebs: Fajardo 16; Asts: Durán, Pérez 6		Pts: Ramírez 13; Rebs: Lara 7 Asts: Ramírez 5

Multisport Complex 1, Santiago
Referees: Leonardo Zalazar (ARG), Felipe Ibarra (CHI), Carmelo de la Rosa (PUR)

Fifth place game

28 October 2023
13:00

Boxscore

Chile	70–79	Venezuela
Scoring by quarter: 20–16, 17–17, 18–20, 23–18
Pts: García, Ovalle 12; Rebs: Gómez 9 Asts: García 5		Pts: Durán 22; Rebs: Urbina 9 Asts: Urbina 6

Multisport Complex 1, Santiago
Referees: Carlos Vélez (COL), Micaela Prado (ARG), Fernando Cavalcante (BRA)

=== 3x3 ===
==== Men's tournament ====
Venezuela qualified a men's team (of 4 athletes) by finishing as one of the six best non qualified teams in the FIBA 3x3 Rankings.

Summary

Team	Event	Preliminary round			Quarterfinal	Semifinal	Final / BM / Pl.	
Team	Event	Opposition Result	Opposition Result	Rank	Opposition Result	Opposition Result	Opposition Result	Rank
Venezuela men	Men's tournament	Haiti; W 21–16	Brazil; L 19–20	2 Q	Puerto Rico; W 21–18	Chile; L 20–22	Trinidad and Tobago; L 20–21	4

Preliminary round

Pos	Team	Pld	W	L	PF	PA	PD	Qualification
1	Brazil	2	2	0	41	26	+15	Quarterfinals
2	Venezuela	2	1	1	40	36	+4	Quarterfinals
3	Haiti	2	0	2	23	42	−19	

Source: Report
Rules for classification: 1) Wins; 2) Head-to-head record; 3) Points scored.

21 October 2023
15:00

Report

Venezuela	21–16	Haiti
Pts: Palacios 9		Pts: Macon 5

Estadio Español
Referees: Marie Houle (CAN) / Lautaro Ojeda (ARG)

22 October 2023
16:30

Report

Brazil	20–19	Venezuela
Pts: de Mello 10		Pts: Palacios 9

Estadio Español
Referees: María Olivieri (ARG) / Felipe Valenzuela (CHI)

Quarterfinal

22 October 2023
20:00

Report

Puerto Rico	18–21	Venezuela
Pts: Matos 9		Pts: Rodriguez 7

Estadio Español
Referees: Felipe Valenzuela (CHI) / Marie Houle (CAN)

Semifinal

23 October 2023
17:30

Report

Venezuela	20–22	Chile
Pts: Rodriguez 8		Pts: Rubio 10

Estadio Español
Referees: Sonia Maldonado (PUR) / Jorge Garcia (DOM)

Bronze medal game

23 October 2023
19:00

Report

Trinidad and Tobago	21–20	Venezuela
Pts: Ahkeel Boyd 12		Pts: Palacios 10

Estadio Español
Referees: Jorge Garcia (DOM) / Yilizeth Vence (COL)

==== Women's tournament ====
Venezuela qualified a women's team (of 4 athletes) by finishing as one of the six best non qualified teams in the FIBA 3x3 Rankings.

Summary

Team	Event	Preliminary round			Quarterfinal	Semifinal	Final / BM / Pl.	
Team	Event	Opposition Result	Opposition Result	Rank	Opposition Result	Opposition Result	Opposition Result	Rank
Venezuela women	Women's tournament	Jamaica; W 21–17	Puerto Rico; L 11–22	2 Q	United States; L 6–21	Did not advance		8

Preliminary round

Pos	Team	Pld	W	L	PF	PA	PD	Qualification
1	Puerto Rico	2	2	0	44	22	+22	Quarterfinals
2	Venezuela	2	1	1	32	39	−7	Quarterfinals
3	Jamaica	2	0	2	28	43	−15	

Source: Report
Rules for classification: 1) Wins; 2) Head-to-head record; 3) Points scored.

21 October 2023
13:00

Report

Venezuela	21–17	Jamaica
Pts: Zapata 11		Pts: Primm 8

Estadio Español Las Condes, Santiago
Referees: Sonia Maldonado (PUR), Marie Houle (CAN)

22 October 2023
14:00

Report

Puerto Rico	22–11	Venezuela
Pts: Plácido 8		Pts: Zapata 6

Estadio Español Las Condes, Santiago
Referees: María Olivieri (ARG), Ana Zachi (BRA)

Quarterfinal

22 October 2023
17:00

Report

United States	21–6	Venezuela
Pts: Dietrick 9		Pts: Sánchez 4

Estadio Español Las Condes, Santiago
Referees: Lautaro Ojeda (ARG), Jorge García (DOM)

== Basque pelota ==
Venezuela qualified a team of four female athletes through the 2023 Pan American Basque Pelota Tournament.

Women

Athlete	Event	Preliminary round					Semifinal	Final / BM	Rank
Athlete	Event	Match 1	Match 2	Match 3	Match 4	Rank	Semifinal	Final / BM	Rank
Athlete	Event	Opposition Score	Opposition Score	Opposition Score	Opposition Score	Rank	Opposition Score	Opposition Score	Rank
Carla Castillo; Fátima Arellano	Rubber Pelota Doubles Trinquete	Figueroa / Fuentes (MEX); L 0–2	García / Pinto (ARG); L 0–2	Vicente / Cuestas (URU); L 0–2	Bastarrica / Domínguez (CHI); L 0–2	5	—N/a	Did not advance	5
Diana Rangel; María Alejandra Borges	Doubles Frontenis	Paredes / Rodríguez (PER); W 2–0	Darriba / Durán (CUB); L 0–2	Plácito / Cepeda (MEX); L 0–2	Muñoz / Bozzo (CHI); L 0–2	4	—N/a	Muñoz / Bozzo (CHI); L 0–2	4

== Bowling ==
Venezuela qualified a full team of two men and two women through the 2022 South American Games held in Asunción, Paraguay.

Athlete	Event	Qualification / Final																Round robin											Semifinal	Final / BM	
Athlete	Event	Block 1							Block 2							Total	Rank	Round robin											Semifinal	Final / BM	
Athlete	Event	1	2	3	4	5	6	Total	7	8	9	10	11	12	Total	Total	Rank	1	2	3	4	5	6	7	8	Total	Grand total	Rank	Opposition Result	Opposition Result	Rank
Rodolfo Monacelli	Men's singles							1700							3435	3435	5	—N/a											Did not advance		5
Luis Rovaina	Men's singles							1723							3335	3335	9	—N/a											Did not advance		9
Rodolfo Monacelli; Luis Rovaina	Men's doubles															3236	6	—N/a													
Alicia Marcano	Women's singles							1429							3006	3006	16	—N/a											Did not advance		16
Karen Marcano	Women's singles							1421							2916	2916	21	—N/a											Did not advance		21
Karen Marcano; Alicia Marcano	Women's doubles															2750	8	—N/a													

== Boxing ==
Venezuela qualified 11 boxers (five men and six women).

Men

Athlete	Event	Round of 32	Round of 16	Quarterfinals	Semifinals	Final	Rank
Athlete	Event	Opposition Result	Opposition Result	Opposition Result	Opposition Result	Opposition Result	Rank
Keymberth González	–51 kg	—N/a	Breedy (BAR); W 5–0	Da Silva (BRA); L 2–3	Did not advance		5
Yoel Finol	–57 kg	—N/a	De los Santos (DOM); L 1–4	Did not advance			9
Jesús Cova	–63.5 kg	Bye	Garcia (USA); L 0–5	Did not advance			9
Christiann Palácio	–71 kg	—N/a	Darrius (HAI); W 5–0	Peka (CAN); L 1–4	Did not advance		5

Women

Athlete	Event	Round of 16	Quarterfinals	Semifinals	Final	Rank
Athlete	Event	Opposition Result	Opposition Result	Opposition Result	Opposition Result	Rank
Tayonis Cedeño	–50 kg	Sandoval (CHI); W 5–0	Lozano (USA); L 2–3	Did not advance		
Johana Gómez	–54 kg	—N/a	Robles (ARG); W 5–0	Arias (COL); L 0–5	Did not advance	3rd place, bronze medalist(s)
Omailyn Alcalá	–57 kg	Reyes (EAI); W 4–1	Calá (CUB); W 5–0	Romeu (BRA); L 1–4	Did not advance	3rd place, bronze medalist(s)
Krisandy Ríos	–60 kg	—N/a	Valdés (COL); L 1–3	Did not advance		5
Yuliannys Álvarez	–66 kg	Piñeiro (PUR); L 0–5	Did not advance			
Maryelis Yriza	–75 kg	Vásquez (COL); W 5–0	Thibeault (CAN); L 0–5	Did not advance		

== Breaking ==
Venezuela qualified one male breakdancer.

Men

Athlete	Nickname	Event	Round robin				Quarterfinal	Semifinal	Final / BM	
Athlete	Nickname	Event	Opposition Result	Opposition Result	Opposition Result	Rank	Opposition Result	Opposition Result	Opposition Result	Rank
Gibrahimer Beomont	Lil G	B-Boys	Leony (BRA); W 2–0	Ricky Rulez (COL); L 0–2	DAF (CHI); W 2–0	1 Q	Matita (CHI); L 0–2	Did not advance		5

== Canoeing ==
=== Slalom ===
Venezuela qualified a total of four slalom athletes (two men and two women).

Athlete	Event	Heats 1		Heats 2		Repechage		Semifinal		Final	
Athlete	Event	Time	Ranking	Time	Ranking	Time	Ranking	Time	Rank	Time	Rank
José Silva	Men's C-1	103.87	7	105.98	7	—N/a		122.46	5 Q	141.38	6
Alexis Pérez	Men's K-1	84.36	6	84.58	6	—N/a		98.60	3 Q	170.20	6
Alexis Pérez	Men's EK-1	53.70	10 Q	—N/a					3	Did not advance	
Marianna Torres	Women's K-1	187.64	9	188.39	9	—N/a		Did not advance			9
Marianna Torres	Women's EK-1	68.50	14 Q	—N/a		2	Q		3	Did not advance	5

=== Sprint ===
Venezuela qualified a total of 5 sprint athletes (two men and three women).

Athlete	Event	Heat		Semifinal		Final	
Athlete	Event	Time	Rank	Time	Rank	Time	Rank
Edwar Padrón	Men's C-1 1000 m	4:53.99	6	4:06.88	3 FA	4:03.54	7
Ray Sánchez	Men's K-1 1000 m	4:08.78	5	3:56.53	4 FB	3:56.32	13
Javianyelis Korovainchenco	Women's C-1 200 m	57.73	5	1:00.79	6 FB	55.76	10
Yocelin Cabeza	Women's K-1 500 m	2:06.48	5	2:10.56	4 FB	2:04.32	10
Mara Gil; Yocelin Cabeza	Women's K-2 500 m	1:56.19	3	2:01.08	4 FA	1:50.48	7

== Cycling ==
Venezuela qualified a total of 14 cyclists (seven men and seven women).

=== BMX ===
Venezuela qualified two male cyclists in BMX race through the UCI World Ranking of Nations.

Freestyle

Athlete	Event	Seeding		Final	
Athlete	Event	Points	Rank	Points	Rank
Daniel Dhers	Men	73.50	4 Q	49.33	7
Katherine Díaz	Women	59.00	2 Q	69.00	3rd place, bronze medalist(s)

Racing

Athlete	Event	Ranking round		Quarterfinal		Semifinal		Final	
Athlete	Event	Time	Rank	Points	Rank	Time	Rank	Time	Rank
Jeferson Milano	Men	34.260	17	9	4 Q	24	8	Did not advance	
Jholman Sivira	Men	33.760	15	8	2 Q	24	8	Did not advance	

=== Road ===
Venezuela qualified seven road cyclists (three men and four women).

Men

Athlete	Event	Time	Rank
Clever Martínez	Road race	3:48:30	28
Leangel Linarez	Road race	3:46:19	16
Orluis Aular	Road race	3:37:58	6
Clever Martínez	Time trial	49:59.56	11
Orluis Aular	Time trial	49:12.63	7

Women

Athlete	Event	Time	Rank
Andisabel Luque	Road race	3:05:40	27
Angie González	Road race	Did not start	
Lilibeth Chacón	Road race	2:53:37	12
Wilmarys Moreno	Road race	3:00:24	23
Lilibeth Chacón	Time trial	28:10.90	11

=== Track ===
Venezuela qualified 9 track cyclists (three men and six women).

Sprint

Athlete	Event	Qualification		Round of 16	Repechage 1	Quarterfinals	Semifinals	Final	
Athlete	Event	Time	Rank	Opposition Time	Opposition Time	Opposition Result	Opposition Result	Opposition Result	Rank
Luis Yanez	Men's individual	10.154	15	Did not advance					15
Jalymar Rodríguez	Women's individual	12.006	16	Did not advance					16

Pursuit

Athlete	Event	Qualification		Semifinals	Finals	
Athlete	Event	Time	Rank	Opposition Result	Opposition Result	Rank
Verónica Abreu; Angie González; Wilmarys Moreno; Jalymar Rodríguez	Women's team	4:51.618	6	L 4:46.841	Did not advance	6

Keirin

Athlete	Event	Heats	Repechage	Final
Athlete	Event	Rank	Rank	Rank
Luis Yanez	Men's	6	Did not advance	
Jalymar Rodríguez	Women's	6	0.205	10

Omnium

Athlete	Event	Scratch race		Tempo race		Elimination race		Points race		Total	
Athlete	Event	Points	Rank	Points	Rank	Points	Rank	Points	Rank	Points	Rank
Clever Martínez	Men's	–1	5	0	9	Did not start					-
Verónica Abreu	Women's		8	4	3	4	10	0	9	88	9

Madison

Athlete	Event	Points	Rank
Angie González; Verónica Abreu	Women's		Did not finish

== Diving ==
Venezuelan qualified 2 divers.

Men

Athlete	Event	Preliminaries		Final	
Athlete	Event	Points	Rank	Points	Rank
Jesús González	1m springboard	315.6	14	Did not advance	14
Jesús González	10 m platform	334.25	11 Q	316.30	12

Women

Athlete	Event	Preliminaries		Final	
Athlete	Event	Points	Rank	Points	Rank
Elizabeth Pérez	1m springboard	228.40	7 Q	232.65	9
Elizabeth Pérez	3 m springboard	260.75	6 Q	264.20	7

== Equestrian ==
Venezuelan equestrians qualified teams in Jumping competition and have also qualified one athlete in the individual dressage competition.

=== Dressage ===
Athlete	Horse	Event	Qualification						Grand Prix Freestyle / Intermediate I Freestyle	
Athlete	Horse	Event	Grand Prix / Prix St. Georges		Grand Prix Special / Intermediate I		Total		Grand Prix Freestyle / Intermediate I Freestyle	
Athlete	Horse	Event	Score	Rank	Score	Rank	Score	Rank	Score	Rank
Patricia Ferrando	Honnaisseur SJ	Individual	66.956	22	68.553	19	75.255	11	75.255	11

=== Jumping ===
Athlete	Horse	Event	Qualification											Final					
Athlete	Horse	Event	Round 1			Round 2 A			Round 2 B			Total		Round 1		Round 2		Total	
Athlete	Horse	Event	Time	Time penalties	Rank	Time	Faults	Rank	Time	Faults	Rank	Faults	Rank	Faults	Rank	Faults	Rank	Faults	Rank
Luis Larrazabal	Condara	Individual	77.70	2.41	7	73.90	4	9	74.54	0	1	4	Q	12	68.26	8	60.60	26.41	15
Juan Ortiz	Catch The Dark Z	Individual	94.09	10.61	32	80.08	8	21	78.81	14	33	30	Q		RET				

== Fencing ==
Venezuela qualified a team of 15 fencers (nine men and six women).

Men

Athlete	Event	Ranking round			Round of 16	Quarterfinal	Semifinal	Final / BM / Pl.	
Athlete	Event	Victories	Defeats	Rank	Opposition Result	Opposition Result	Opposition Result	Opposition Result	Rank
Rubén Limardo	Individual épée	3	2	3	McDowald (USA); L 12–14	Did not advance			9
Francisco Limardo	Individual épée	4	1	2	Lugones (ARG); W 9–8	McDowald (USA); W 15–13	French (CAN); L 5–15	Did not advance	3rd place, bronze medalist(s)
Rubén Limardo; Francisco Limardo; Grabiel Lugo	Team épée	—N/a				Chile; W 33–23	United States; L 41–45	Argentina; L 42–43	4
César Aguirre	Individual foil	0	5	6	Did not advance				17
Antonio Leal	Individual foil	2	3	5	Broszus (CAN); L 11–15	Did not advance			9
Antonio Leal; Janderson Briceño; César Aguirre	Team foil	—N/a				United States; L 21–45	Argentina; L 39–45	Colombia; W 45–40	7
José Félix Quintero	Individual sabre	5	0	1	Santana (PUR); W 15–5	Doddo (USA); L 9–15	Did not advance		5
Eliecer Romero	Individual sabre	2	3	4	Dolegiewicz (USA); W 15–10	Monsalva (CHI); W 15–4	Arfa (CAN); W 15–12	Doddo (USA); L 11–15	2nd place, silver medalist(s)
Hender Medina	Individual sabre	0	6	7	Did not advance				18
José Félix Quintero; Hender Medina; Eliecer Romero	Team sabre	—N/a				Chile; W 45–37	United States; L 27–45	Colombia; W 45–39	3rd place, bronze medalist(s)

Women

Athlete	Event	Ranking round			Round of 16	Quarterfinal	Semifinal	Final / BM / Pl.	
Athlete	Event	Victories	Defeats	Rank	Opposition Result	Opposition Result	Opposition Result	Opposition Result	Rank
María Martínez	Individual épée	1	4	5	Xiao (CAN); L 10–15	Did not advance			9
Lizze Asis	Individual épée	3	2	2	Fernández (CHI); L 7–10	Did not advance			9
Eliana Lugo; Lizze Asis; María Martínez	Team épée	—N/a				Chile; W 44–32	Brazil; L 35–45	Mexico; W 45–42	3rd place, bronze medalist(s)
Luismar Banezca	Individual sabre	0	5	6	Did not advance				18
Katherine Paredes	Individual sabre	1	4	5	Gordon (CAN); L 6–15	Did not advance			9
Crelia Ramos; Luismar Banezca; Katherine Paredes	Team sabre	—N/a				Mexico; L 30–45	Colombia; W 45–41	Brazil; L 33–45	6

== Golf ==
Venezuela qualified a full team of 4 golfers (two per gender).

Athlete	Event	Round 1	Round 2	Round 3	Round 4	Total		
Athlete	Event	Score	Score	Score	Score	Score	Par	Rank
Rocco Saraceni	Men's individual	71	81	76	79	310	+22	30
Virgilio Paz	Men's individual	74	67	76	70	284	–4	17
Claudia Perazzo	Women's individual	73	78	74	82	307	+19	21
Vanessa Gilly	Women's individual	75	72	74	71	292	+4	10

== Gymnastics ==
=== Artistic ===
Venezuela qualified four gymnasts in artistic (two men and two women) at the 2023 Pan American Championships.

Men

Athlete	Event	Qualification						Total	Rank
Athlete	Event	F	PH	R	V	PB	HB	Total	Rank
Adickxon Trejo	Individual all-around	12.433	11.933	12.333	13.533	12.800	12.533	75.565	17 Q
Edward Rolin	Individual all-around	11.133	10.233	11.466	13.933	10.500	9.166	66.431	33

Qualification Legend: Q = Qualified to apparatus final

Individual finals

Athlete	Event	Apparatus						Total	
Athlete	Event	F	PH	R	PB	V	HB	Score	Rank
Adickxon Trejo	Individual all-around	12.533	12.700	12.466	13.700	12.100	12.333	75.832	15

Women

Athlete	Event	Qualification				Total	Rank
Athlete	Event	V	UB	BB	F	Total	Rank
Deborah Salmina	Individual all-around	12.533	10.733	9.633	11.733	44.632	30 Q

Qualification Legend: Q = Qualified to apparatus final

Individual finals

Athlete	Event	Apparatus				Total	
Athlete	Event	V	UB	BB	F	Score	Rank
Deborah Salmina	Individual all-around	12.633	10.800	10.033	11.466	44.932	21

=== Rhythmic ===
Venezuela qualified one individual gymnast and five gymnasts for the group event in rhythmic (six women).

Individual

Athlete	Event	Apparatus				Total	
Athlete	Event	Ball	Clubs	Hoop	Ribbon	Score	Rank
Sophia Fernández	All-around	25.150	23.400	25.500	22.800	96.850	15
Sophia Fernández	Ball		—N/a				
Sophia Fernández	Clubs	—N/a		—N/a			
Sophia Fernández	Hoop	—N/a			—N/a		
Sophia Fernández	Ribbon	—N/a				—N/a	

Group

Athlete	Event	Apparatus		Total	
Athlete	Event	5 balls	3 hoops + 2 clubs	Score	Rank
María Domínguez; Rocelyn Palencia; Yelbery Rodríguez; Gabriela Rodríguez; Isabella Bellizzio	All-around	26.650 Q	23.200 Q	49.850	4
María Domínguez; Rocelyn Palencia; Yelbery Rodríguez; Gabriela Rodríguez; Isabella Bellizzio	5 hoops	23.250	—N/a		6
María Domínguez; Rocelyn Palencia; Yelbery Rodríguez; Gabriela Rodríguez; Isabella Bellizzio	3 ribbons + 2 balls	—N/a	21.150	—N/a	6

== Judo ==
Venezuela has qualified 9 judokas (four men and five women).

Men

Athlete	Event	Round of 16	Quarterfinals	Semifinals	Repechage	Final / BM	
Athlete	Event	Opposition Result	Opposition Result	Opposition Result	Opposition Result	Opposition Result	Rank
Iván Salas	−60 kg	Rojas (COL); L 00–01	Did not advance				
Willis Alberto García	−66 kg	Tovagliari (ARG); W 10–00	De Sousa (BRA); W 10–01	Polanco (CUB); W 10–00	—N/a	Frascadore (CAN); W 10–00	1st place, gold medalist(s)
Sergio Mattey	−73 kg	Tornal (DOM); L 01–00	Did not advance				
Carlos Páez	−90 kg	Arancibia (CHI); W 10–00	Macedo (BRA); L 00–10	Did not advance	Knauf (USA); L 00–10	Did not advance	7
Luis Amézquita	+100 kg	Da Silva (BRA); L 00–10	Did not advance				9

Women

Athlete	Event	Round of 16	Quarterfinals	Semifinals	Repechage	Final / BM	
Athlete	Event	Opposition Result	Opposition Result	Opposition Result	Opposition Result	Opposition Result	Rank
María Gimenez	−48 kg	Vilhalba (BRA); L 10–00	Did not advance				
Fabiola Díaz	−52 kg	Bye	Cordones (PAN); L 10–00	Did not advance	Echevarria (PUR); L 01–00	Did not advance	7
Elvismar Rodríguez	−70 kg	Bye	Willrich (BRA); W 11–00	Pérez (PUR); L 10–00	—N/a	Oliveira (BRA); W 10–00	3rd place, bronze medalist(s)
Amarantha Urdaneta	+78 kg	Bye	Marenco (NCA); W 10–00	Carabalí (COL); L 00–10	—N/a	Souza (BRA); L 00–10	5

Mixed

Athlete	Event	Round of 16	Quarterfinal	Semifinal	Repechage	Final / BM	
Athlete	Event	Opposition Result	Opposition Result	Opposition Result	Opposition Result	Opposition Result	Rank
Iván Salas; Fabiola Díaz; Elvismar Rodríguez; Amarantha Urdaneta; Sergio Mattey; Carlos Páez; Luis Amézquita; María Giménez; Willis Alberto García	Team	Bye	Brazil; L 1–4	Did not advance	Argentina; L 2–4	Did not advance	7

== Karate ==
Venezuela qualified a team of six karatekas (two men and four women) at the 2023 Central American and Caribbean Championship and the 2023 Pan American Championships.

Kumite

Athlete	Event	Round robin					Semifinal	Final	
Athlete	Event	Opposition Result	Opposition Result	Opposition Result	Opposition Result	Rank	Opposition Result	Opposition Result	Rank
Andrés Madera	Men's −67 kg	—N/a	Rezede (BRA); W 2–0	Freire (CHI); L 8–8 ^{S}	Esparza (MEX); W 7–0	2 Q	Gálvez (PAN); W 3–2	Freire (CHI); W 3–3 ^{S}	1st place, gold medalist(s)
Yorgelis Salazar	Women's −50 kg	—N/a	Polanco (DOM); W 3–0	Vega (CHI); W 9–1	Lahyanssa (CAN); W 10–3	1 Q	Morales (EAI); W 8–2	Lahyanssa (CAN); W 5–2	1st place, gold medalist(s)
Claudymar Garcés	Women's −61 kg	Wong (EAI); L 0–4	Díaz (ARG); W 7–1	Chacón (CUB); W 4–1	Ramírez (COL); W 10–2	2 Q	Fonseca (PUR); L 6–7	Did not advance	3rd place, bronze medalist(s)
Marianth Cuervo	Women's −68 kg	Bratic (CAN); L 0–3	Campos (MEX); L 1–5	Rodrigues (BRA); L 0–1	Aponte (BOL); W ^{K}	4	Did not advance		7

Kata

Athlete	Event	Round robin				Final / BM	
Athlete	Event	Opposition Result	Opposition Result	Opposition Result	Rank	Opposition Result	Rank
Cleiver Leocádio	Men's individual	Conde (BRA); W 39.80 – 38.60	Wong (PER); W 40.50 – 39.00	Luengo (CHI); W 40.10 – 37.90	1 Q	Torres (USA); L 42.60 – 40.10	2nd place, silver medalist(s)
Andrea Armada	Women's individual	Zapata (COL); L 39.80 – 40.50	Orbe (ECU); L 38.00 – 38.90	Laos (CAN); W 39.20 – 38.10	3	Yonamine (BRA); W 40.30 – 40.20	3rd place, bronze medalist(s)

== Modern pentathlon ==
Venezuela qualified three modern pentathletes (two men and one woman).

Athlete	Event	Fencing (Épée one touch)				Swimming (200 m freestyle)			Riding (Show jumping)			Shooting / Running (10 m laser pistol / 3000 m cross-country)			Total	
Athlete	Event	V – D	Rank	MP points	BP	Time	Rank	MP points	Penalties	Rank	MP points	Time	Rank	MP points	MP points	Rank
Albert Rivas	Men's individual	16–14	13	220	222	2:19.98	14	261				12:07.60	13	573	1056	26
Yicxon Pérez	Men's individual	11–19	25	190	198	2:16.77	9	277				12:03.70	14	577	1052	28
Albert Rivas; Yicxon Pérez	Men's relay	23-13	1	230	234	2:03.82	10	303	2:41.00	7	252	13:02.10	9	518	1307	7
Osmaidy Arias	Women's individual	11–21	28	184	186	2:24.86	2	261				12:25.30	10	555	1002	19
Albert Rivas; Osmaidy Arias	Mixed relay	14–30	12	182	184	2:05.66	5	299	EL			15:30.50	10	460	943	10

== Roller sports ==
=== Speed ===
Men

Athlete	Event	Preliminary		Semifinal		Final	
Athlete	Event	Time	Rank	Time	Rank	Time	Rank
José Carlos Rangel	200 m time trial	—N/a				18.354	7
José Carlos Rangel	500 m + distance	43.314	2 Q	43.861	3 q	44.606	4
José Carlos Rangel	1000 m sprint	1:24.282	4 Q	—N/a		1:26.478	7
Gustavo Rodríguez	10,000 m elimination	—N/a				EL	9

Women

Athlete	Event	Preliminary		Semifinal		Final	
Athlete	Event	Time	Rank	Time	Rank	Time	Rank
Wilmary Davila	200 m time trial	—N/a				19.675	10
Wilmary Davila	500 m + distance	46.031	4 Q	46.720	6 Q	DSQ	
Angy Quintero	1000 m sprint	1:29.608	7 q	—N/a		1:28.794	3rd place, bronze medalist(s)
Angy Quintero	10,000 m elimination	—N/a				EL	4

== Rowing ==
Venezuela qualified a team of 8 athletes (three men and five women).

Men

Athlete	Event	Heat		Repechage		Semifinal		Final A/B	
Athlete	Event	Time	Rank	Time	Rank	Time	Rank	Time	Rank
Jakson Vicent	Single sculls	7:47.85	3	7:29.04	2	7:55.24	5 FB	7:36.32	10
Andre Mora; Jaime Machado	Double sculls	6:58.55	4	6:43.54	2	6:43.25	4 FB	6:41.77	8

Women

Athlete	Event	Heat		Repechage		Semifinal		Final A/B	
Athlete	Event	Time	Rank	Time	Rank	Time	Rank	Time	Rank
Kimberlin Meneses	Single sculls	8:55.17	4	8:16.95	2	8:20.41	5 FB	8:25.30	10
Francis Chacín; Yendris Vasquez	Coxless pair	8:47.20	5	8:45.03	6	—N/a		8:50.93	10
Ysmaly Granadino; Keyla García	Double sculls	8:18.98	5	8:02.09	6 FB	—N/a		8:04.83	10

== Sailing ==
Venezuela has qualified 6 boats for a total of 8 sailors.

Men

Athlete	Event	Opening series																		Finals				
Athlete	Event	1	2	3	4	5	6	7	8	9	10	11	12	13	14	15	16	Points	Rank	QF	SF	M / F	Points	Rank
José Estredo	IQFoil	(6)	(8)	(6)	5	2	2	3	4	6	6	3	3	1	3	2	5	45	4 Q	4			—N/a	7
Marx Chirinos	Sunfish	6	5	7	5	(9) (DNF)						—N/a						68	8	—N/a				8

Women

Athlete	Event	Opening series																		Finals				
Athlete	Event	1	2	3	4	5	6	7	8	9	10	11	12	13	14	15	16	Points	Rank	QF	SF	M / F	Points	Rank
Carenys Salazar	IQFoil	(11) (DNF)	(11) (DNF)	(11) (DNF)	11 (DNF)	6	7	5	7	11 (DNF)	6	6	5	5	7	7	8	91	6 Q	4			—N/a	7
Daniela Rivera	Laser Radial	8	(11)	8	10	10	9	10	10	9	11	—N/a						85	11	—N/a				
Sabrina Hernández	Sunfish	5	9	9	(10)	9	10	10	10	10	10	—N/a						82	10	—N/a				

Mixed

Athlete	Event	Race													Total	
Athlete	Event	1	2	3	4	5	6	7	8	9	10	11	12	M	Points	Rank
Yamil Saba; Dismary Bonillo; Andrea Saba	Lightning	(8)	8	8	8	8	8	7	8	8	8	—N/a				

== Shooting ==
Venezuela qualified a total of five shooters after the 2022 Americas Shooting Championships. Venezuela also qualified one shooter during the 2022 South American Games.

Men

Pistol and rifle

Athlete	Event	Qualification		Final	
Athlete	Event	Points	Rank	Points	Rank
Douglas Gómez	25 m rapid fire pistol	282	6 Q	26	2nd place, silver medalist(s)
Julio Iemma	10 m air rifle	618.1	8 Q	121	8

Men

Shotgun

Athlete	Event	Qualification 1		Qualification 2		Final	
Athlete	Event	Points	Rank	Points	Rank	Points	Rank
Leonel Martínez	Trap	46	8	69	5 Q	42	2nd place, silver medalist(s)
Mario Soares	Trap	43	15	69	5	Did not advance	14

Women

Pistol and rifle

Athlete	Event	Qualification		Final	
Athlete	Event	Points	Rank	Points	Rank
Dairene Márquez	10 m air rifle	577.2	26	Did not advance	
Dairene Márquez	Rifle 3 x 20	545-9x	24	Did not advance	
Verónica Lozada	10 m air pistol	552-6x	19	Did not advance	
Maribel Pineda	10 m air pistol	538-7x	26	Did not advance	
Maribel Pineda	25 m pistol	564	8 Q	5	8

== Softball ==
Venezuela qualified a women's team (of 18 athletes) by virtue of its campaign in the 2022 Pan American Championships.

Summary

Team	Event	Preliminary round				Super Round			Final / BM / Pl.	
Team	Event	Opposition Result	Opposition Result	Opposition Result	Rank	Opposition Result	Opposition Result	Rank	Opposition Result	Rank
Venezuela women	Women's tournament	Mexico; L 2–9	United States; L 2–9	Chile; W 13–0	3	Did not advance			Cuba; L 0–4	6

Preliminary round

Pos	Team	Pld	W	L	RF	RA	PCT	GB	Qualification
1	United States	3	3	0	34	2	1.000	—	Super Round
2	Mexico	3	2	1	17	9	.667	1	Super Round
3	Venezuela	3	1	2	17	18	.333	2	Fifth place game
4	Chile (H)	3	0	3	0	39	.000	3	Seventh place game

Source: Santiago 2023 and WBSC Americas
(H) Hosts

October 29; 10:00	Mexico	9–2 (F/6)	Venezuela	Baseball and Softball Center, Santiago
October 29; 10:00		Boxscore		Baseball and Softball Center, Santiago

October 30; 13:00	United States	9–2 (F/6)	Venezuela	Baseball and Softball Center, Santiago
October 30; 13:00		Boxscore		Baseball and Softball Center, Santiago

October 31; 16:00	Venezuela	13–0 (F/4)	Chile	Baseball and Softball Center, Santiago
October 31; 16:00		Boxscore		Baseball and Softball Center, Santiago

Fifth place game

November 2; 13:00	Cuba	4–0	Venezuela	Baseball and Softball Center, Santiago
November 2; 13:00		Boxscore		Baseball and Softball Center, Santiago

== Sport climbing ==
Venezuela qualified a team of 4 athletes (three men and one woman) by virtue of their IFSC world rankings.

Boulder & lead

Athlete	Event	Qualification						Final						
Athlete	Event	Bouldering		Lead		Total		Bouldering		Lead			Total	
Athlete	Event	Result	Rank	Hold	Rank	Points	Rank	Result	Rank	Hold	Time	Rank	Points	Rank
Gianstéfano di Nino	Men's	48.9	17	22.21	19	71.0	19	Did not advance						
Luis Reinaldo Castellanos	Men's	29.5	20	14.1	20	43.6	20	Did not advance						
Lianet Castillo	Women's	64.5	9	26.1	1	90.6	4 Q	Did not advance						9

Speed

Athlete	Event	Round of 16	Quarterfinal	Semifinal	Final / BM	
Athlete	Event	Opposition Result	Opposition Result	Opposition Result	Opposition Result	Rank
Gustavo Pérez	Men's	Bratschi (USA); L 5.48 – 10.27	Did not advance			

== Surfing ==
Venezuela qualified two male surfers.

Artistic

Athlete	Event	Round 1	Round 2	Round 3	Round 4	Repechage 1	Repechage 2	Repechage 3	Repechage 4	Repechage 5	Final / BM	
Athlete	Event	Opposition Result	Opposition Result	Opposition Result	Opposition Result	Opposition Result	Opposition Result	Opposition Result	Opposition Result	Opposition Result	Opposition Result	Rank
Francisco Bellorín	Men's shortboard	Young (CAN); W 12.93 – 9.50	Urbina (CRC); W 10.46 – 5.00	Cleland (MEX); W 8.53 – 4.93	Tudela (PER); W 12.33 – 8.66	—N/a	—N/a	—N/a	—N/a	—N/a	Mesinas (PER); L 9.10 – 13.16	2nd place, silver medalist(s)
José Joaquín López	Men's shortboard	Tudela (PER); L 11.60 – 14.27	Did not advance			Correa (BRA); L 4.50 – 16.6	Did not advance					

== Swimming ==
Men

Athlete	Event	Heat		Final	
Athlete	Event	Time	Rank	Time	Rank
Alberto Mestre	50 m freestyle	22.20	3 Q	22.16	4
Alberto Mestre	100 m freestyle	49.28	9 Q	48.96	6
Diego Mas Fraiz	50 m freestyle	22.64	10 q	22.59	11
Alfonso Mestre	200 m freestyle	1:49.33	6 Q	1:49.29	6
Alfonso Mestre	400 m freestyle	3:55.67	4 Q	3:47.62	2nd place, silver medalist(s)
Alfonso Mestre	800 m freestyle	—N/a		7:54.46	2nd place, silver medalist(s)
Alfonso Mestre	1500 m freestyle	—N/a		15:19.60	3rd place, bronze medalist(s)
Eric Veit	100 m breaststroke	1:04.31	20	Did not advance	
Eric Veit	200 m breaststroke	2:19.43	16 q	2:20.51	15
Jorge Otaiza	100 m butterfly	53.08	3 Q	52.95	5
Jorge Otaiza	200 m butterfly	2:03.31	13 q	Did not start	
Emil Pérez	100 m butterfly	54.63	13 q	55.08	16
Winston Rodríguez	200 m medley	2:08.82	19	Did not advance	
Alberto Mestre; Alfonso Mestre; Emil Perez; Jesús López; Diego Mas*	4 × 100 m freestyle relay	3:25.19	7 Q	3:20.79	5
Winston Rodríguez; Alfonso Mestre; Emil Perez; Bryan Chávez	4 × 200 m freestyle relay	7:50.57	6 Q	7:42.04	7
Jorge Otaiza; Alberto Mestre; Jesús López; Eric Veit	4 × 100 m medley relay	3:49.32	8 Q	3:45.86	8

Open water

Athlete	Event	Final	
Athlete	Event	Time	Rank
Diego Vera	10 km open water	1:50:40.7	8
Johndry Segovia	10 km open water	1:51:44.2	11

Women

Athlete	Event	Heat		Final	
Athlete	Event	Time	Rank	Time	Rank
Maria Yegres	100 m freestyle	57.57	16 q	Did not start	16
Maria Yegres	200 m freestyle	2:03.17	10 q	2:02.03	9
Maria Yegres	400 m freestyle	4:23.47	8 Q	4:22.47	8
Maria Yegres	800 m freestyle	—N/a		9:01.12	9
Maria Yegres	1500 m freestyle	—N/a		17:26.48	9
Carla González	100 m backstroke	1:02.09	5 Q	1:01.92	6
Mercedes Toledo	100 m breaststroke	1:10.48	9 q	1:10.58	11
Mercedes Toledo	200 m breaststroke	2:33.50	9 q	2:35.42	12
Lismar Lyon	50 m freestyle	25.91	10 q	25.55	10
Lismar Lyon	100 m butterfly	1:01.88	13 q	1:01.86	14
Mariana Cote	400 m individual medley	5:06.11	11 q	5:04.65	11
Mercedes Toledo; Maria Yegres; Mariana Cote; Fabiana Pesce; Carla González*	4 × 100 m freestyle relay	3:50.28	8 Q	3:48.25	8
Maria Yegres; Mariana Cote; Paola Pérez; Fabiana Pesce; Carla González*	4 × 200 m freestyle relay	8:31.53	5 Q	8:30.99	7
Mercedes Toledo; Maria Yegres; Mariana Cote; Lismar Lyon; Carla González*	4 × 100 m medley relay	4:13.65	6 Q	4:11.15	7

Mixed

Athlete	Event	Heat		Final	
Athlete	Event	Time	Rank	Time	Rank
Emil Pérez; Diego Mas; María Yegres; Carla González; Jesús López*; Mercedes Toledo*; Fabiana Pesce*	4 × 100 m freestyle relay	3:38.48	4 Q	3:35.88	7
Emil Pérez; Jorge Otaiza; Carla González; Mercedes Toledo; Jesús López*; Eric Veit*; Lismar Lyon*; Fabiana Pesce*	4 × 100 m medley relay	4:04.56	8 Q	3:56.66	7

Legend: (*) = Swimmers who participated in the heat only.

== Table tennis ==
Venezuela qualified a team of four athletes (one man and three women) through the 2023 South American Championship and the Special Qualification Event.

Men

Athlete	Event	Round of 32	Round of 16	Quarterfinal	Semifinal	Final / BM	
Athlete	Event	Opposition Result	Opposition Result	Opposition Result	Opposition Result	Opposition Result	Rank
Cesar Castillo	Singles	Pereira (CUB); L 1–4	Did not advance				17

Women

Athlete	Event	Group stage			First round	Second round	Quarterfinal	Semifinal	Final / BM	
Athlete	Event	Opposition Result	Opposition Result	Rank	Opposition Result	Opposition Result	Opposition Result	Opposition Result	Opposition Result	Rank
Camila Obando	Singles	—N/a			Takahashi (BRA); L 0–4	Did not advance				17
Roxy González	Singles	—N/a			Liao (CAN); W 4–2	Crespo (CUB); W 4–3	Takahashi (BRA); L 2–4	Did not advance		5
Camila Obando; Roxy González	Doubles	—N/a				Téllez / Perdomo (COL); W 4–3	Wang / Sung (USA); L 0–4	Did not advance		5
Cristina Olivera; Roxy González; Camila Obando	Team	Canada; L 1–3	Mexico; L 0–3	3	—N/a		Did not advance			20

Mixed

Athlete	Event	Round of 32	Round of 16	Quarterfinal	Semifinal	Final / BM	
Athlete	Event	Opposition Result	Opposition Result	Opposition Result	Opposition Result	Opposition Result	Rank
Cesar Arocha; Roxy González	Doubles	Bye	Takahashi / Ishiy (BRA); L 0–4	Did not advance			9

== Tennis ==
Men

Athlete	Event	Round of 64	Round of 32	Round of 16	Quarterfinal	Semifinal	Final / BM	
Athlete	Event	Opposition Result	Opposition Result	Opposition Result	Opposition Result	Opposition Result	Opposition Result	Rank
Brandon Pérez	Singles	Bye	Díaz (ARG); L 6–2, 6–1	Did not advance				17
Ignacio Martínez	Singles	Bye	Hardt (DOM); L 6–1, 6–0	Did not advance				17
Ricardo Rodríguez	Singles	Cid (DOM); L 6–0, 6–2	Did not advance					33
Brandon Pérez; Ricardo Rodríguez	Doubles	—N/a		Flores / Crespo (CRC); L 3–6, 7–5, [3–10]	Did not advance			

Women

Athlete	Event	Round of 64	Round of 32	Round of 16	Quarterfinal	Semifinal	Final / BM	
Athlete	Event	Opposition Result	Opposition Result	Opposition Result	Opposition Result	Opposition Result	Opposition Result	Rank
Vanessa Suárez	Singles	Weedon (EAI); W 4–6, 6–0, 6–2	Herazo (COL); W 6–4, 7–6^{(8–6)}	Ccuno (PER); W 6–1, 6–3	Riera (ARG); L 4–6, 2–6	Did not advance		

Mixed

Athlete	Event	Round of 16	Quarterfinal	Semifinal	Final / BM	
Athlete	Event	Opposition Result	Opposition Result	Opposition Result	Opposition Result	Rank
Brandon Pérez; Vanessa Suárez	Doubles	Boyer / Loeb (USA); L 4–6, 4–6	Did not advance			

== Taekwondo ==
Venezuela qualified six athletes (two men and four women) for Kyorugi events during the Pan American Games Qualification Tournament.

Kyorugi (sparring)

Men

Athlete	Event	Preliminary round	Quarterfinal	Semifinal	Repechage	Final / BM	
Athlete	Event	Opposition Result	Opposition Result	Opposition Result	Opposition Result	Opposition Result	Rank
Yohandri Granado	–58 kg	Grant (USA); W 2–0	Park (CAN); L 0–2	Did not advance	—N/a	Did not advance	8
Edgar Contreras	–80 kg	Salazar (MEX); L 0–2	Did not advance		—N/a	Did not advance	
Luis Álvarez	+80 kg	Ferrera (ESA); W 2–0	Bergeron (CAN); L 0–2	Did not advance	—N/a	Did not advance	8
Luis Álvarez; Edgar Contreras; Yohandri Granado	Kyorugi Team	Canada; L 82–85	Did not advance		—N/a	Did not advance	

Women

Athlete	Event	Preliminary round	Quarterfinal	Semifinal	Repechage	Final / BM	
Athlete	Event	Opposition Result	Opposition Result	Opposition Result	Opposition Result	Opposition Result	Rank
Virginia Dellan	–49 kg	Grippoli (URU); L 1–2	Did not advance		—N/a	Did not advance	
Alexmar Sulbarán	–57 kg	Godoy (ARG); W 2–1	Lima (BRA); L 0–2	Did not advance	—N/a	Carsten (PAN); L 0–2	5
Jarolit Castellanos	–67 kg	Soltero (MEX); L 0–2	Did not advance		Teachout (USA); L 0–2	Did not advance	
Carolina Fernández	+67 kg	Folleco (ECU); L 0–2	Did not advance		—N/a	Did not advance	
Alexmar Sulbarán; Virginia Dellan; Carolina Fernández	Kyorugi Team	Puerto Rico; W 72–68	Mexico; L 37–82	Did not advance	—N/a	Did not advance	

== Triathlon ==
Venezuela qualified a team of four triathletes (two men and two women).

Athlete	Event	Swim (1.5 km)	Trans 1	Bike (40 km)	Trans 2	Run (10 km)	Total	Rank
Luís Miguel Velásquez	Men's individual	18:15	19:05	1:14:49	1:15:15	1:49:11	1:49:11	16
Yhousman Perdomo	Men's individual	18:17	19:04	1:14:47	1:15:15	1:50:00	1:50:00	17
Genesis Ruiz	Women's individual	19:49	20:49					DNF
Rosa Martínez	Women's individual	19:33	20:29	1:22:24	1:22:56	2:00:54	2:00:54	17

Mixed relay

Athlete	Event	Swimming (300 m)	Transition 1	Biking (6.6 km)	Transition 2	Running (1.5 km)	Total	Rank
Luis Miguel Velásquez	Mixed relay	3:19	4:04	12:52	13:16	17:59	17:59	—N/a
Rosa Martínez	Mixed relay	21:58	22:48	32:28	32:54	38:09	38:09	—N/a
Yhousman Perdomo	Mixed relay	41:49	42:32	51:48	52:10	56:51	56:51	—N/a
Genesis Ruiz	Mixed relay	1:01:17	1:01:52	1:12:01	1:12:25	1:18:11	1:18:11	—N/a
Total	Mixed relay	—N/a					1:18:11	6

== Weightlifting ==
Venezuela qualified eight weightlifters (four per gender).

Men

Athlete	Event	Snatch		Clean & jerk		Total	
Athlete	Event	Weight	Rank	Weight	Rank	Weight	Rank
Wilkeinner Lugo	–61 kg	125	1	149	4	274	4
Julio Mayora	–73 kg	154	1	188	1	342	1st place, gold medalist(s)
Keydomar Vallenilla	–89 kg	168	1	211	1	383	1st place, gold medalist(s)
Jhohan Sanguino	–102 kg	166	3	205	3	371	3rd place, bronze medalist(s)

Women

Athlete	Event	Snatch		Clearn & jerk		Total	
Athlete	Event	Weight	Rank	Weight	Rank	Weight	Rank
Katherin Echandía	–49 kg	84	2	105	2	189	2nd place, silver medalist(s)
Anyelin Venegas	–59 kg	100	3	122	4	222	3rd place, bronze medalist(s)
Dayana Chirinos	–81 kg	99	9	132	4	231	7
Naryuri Pérez	+87 kg	115	4	148	5	263	5

== Wrestling ==
Venezuela qualified 16 wrestlers (10 men and 6 women) through the 2022 Pan American Wrestling Championships and the 2023 Pan American Wrestling Championships.

Key:

- VT – Victory by fall.
- PP – Decision by points – the loser with technical points.
- PO – Decision by points – the loser without technical points.
- SP – Technical superiority – the loser with technical points and a margin of victory of at least 9 (Greco-Roman) or 10 (freestyle) points.
- ST – Great superiority – the loser without technical points and a margin of victory of at least 8 (Greco-Roman) or 10 (freestyle) points.
- VA – Decision by withdrawal

Men

Athlete	Event	Quarterfinal	Semifinal	Final / BM	
Athlete	Event	Opposition Result	Opposition Result	Opposition Result	Rank
Pedro Mejías	Freestyle 57 kg	Diversent (CUB); L 1–3 ^{PP}	Did not advance		7
Anthony Montero	Freestyle 74 kg	Berger (USA); L 1–3 ^{PP}	Did not advance	Valencia (MEX); W 3–1 ^{PP}	3rd place, bronze medalist(s)
Pedro Ceballos	Freestyle 86 kg	Gajardo (CHI); W 4–1 ^{SP}	Torreblanca (CUB); L 0–3 ^{PO}	Izquierdo (COL); W 3–1 ^{PP}	3rd place, bronze medalist(s)
Cristian Sarco	Freestyle 97 kg	Angulo (COL); W 4–1 ^{SP}	Silot (CUB); L 0–3 ^{PO}	Uribe (CHI); W 4–0 ^{ST}	3rd place, bronze medalist(s)
José Díaz	Freestyle 125 kg	Smith (PUR); W 3–0 ^{PO}	Muriel (ARG); W 3–0 ^{PO}	Parris (USA); L 0–3 ^{PO}	2nd place, silver medalist(s)
Raiber Rodríguez	Greco-Roman 60 kg	Toro (COL); W 3–1 ^{PP}	de Armas (CUB); L 1–3 ^{PP}	Torres (CHI); W 3–1 ^{PP}	3rd place, bronze medalist(s)
Wuileixis Rivas	Greco-Roman 77 kg	Viruet (PUR); W 3–1 ^{PP}	de Brito (BRA); L 1–3 ^{PP}	Benítez (MEX); L 1–3 ^{PP}	5
Luis Avendaño	Greco-Roman 87 kg	Alfonso (HON); W 4–0 ^{ST}	Muñoz (COL); W 3–1 ^{PP}	Grégorich (CUB); L 1–3 ^{PP}	2nd place, silver medalist(s)
Luillys Pérez	Greco-Roman 97 kg	Queiroz (BRA); W 3–1 ^{PP}	Gómez (ARG); W 4–0 ^{ST}	Rosillo (CUB); L 1–4 ^{SP}	2nd place, silver medalist(s)
Moisés Pérez	Greco-Roman 130 kg	Morales (MEX); W 3–1 ^{PP}	Schultz (USA); L 1–3 ^{PP}	López (PUR); W 4–1 ^{SP}	3rd place, bronze medalist(s)

Women

Athlete	Event	Group stage				Round of 16	Quarterfinal	Semifinal	Final / BM	
Athlete	Event	Opposition Result	Opposition Result	Opposition Result	Rank	Opposition Result	Opposition Result	Opposition Result	Opposition Result	Rank
Mariana Rojas	50 kg	Morán (PAN); W 4–0 ^{ST}	Oliveira (BRA); W 3–1 ^{PP}	Guzmán (CUB); L 0–3 ^{PO}	2 Q	—N/a		Mollocana (ECU); L 0–5 ^{VT}	Golston (USA); W 3–0 ^{PO}	3rd place, bronze medalist(s)
Betzabeth Argüello	53 kg	—N/a				Bye	Acosta (MEX); W 5–0 ^{VT}	Herin (CUB); L 1–3 ^{PP}	Chavez (USA); W 4–1 ^{SP}	3rd place, bronze medalist(s)
Betzabeth Sarco	57 kg	—N/a				Rodríguez (PUR); W 3–1 ^{PP}	Palacios (CHI); W 5–0 ^{VT}	Taylor (CAN); L 0–5 ^{VT}	Valverde (ECU); L 0–5 ^{VT}	5
Nathaly Grimán	62 kg	—N/a					Nunes (BRA); L 1–3 ^{PP}	Did not advance	Miracle (USA); L 1–3 ^{PP}	5
Soleymi Caraballo	68 kg	—N/a				Bye	Di Bacco (CAN); W 5–0 ^{VT}	Garnica (MEX); W 3–1 ^{PP}	Molinari (USA); L 1–3 ^{PP}	2nd place, silver medalist(s)
María Acosta	76 kg	—N/a				Bye	Ramírez (URU); W 5–0 ^{VT}	Marín (CUB); L 0–5 ^{VT}	Kuebeck (CAN); W 5–0 ^{VT}	3rd place, bronze medalist(s)

== Non-competing sports ==
=== Women's tournament ===
Venezuela qualified a women's team of 18 athletes after finishing sixth at the 2022 Copa América Femenina in Colombia. Venezuela's women's team was going to be making its Pan American Games debut, however, the team withdrew before the event.

== See also ==
- Venezuela at the 2024 Summer Olympics
