= Puerto Rico at the 2023 Pan American Games =

- IOC code: PUR
- NOC: Puerto Rico Olympic Committee

in Santiago, Chile 20 October 2023 – 5 November 2023
- Competitors: 174 in 19 sports
- Flag bearers (opening): Jean Pizarro & María Pérez
- Flag bearers (closing): Jean Pizarro & Janessa Fonseca
- Medals Ranked 13th: Gold 3 Silver 6 Bronze 11 Total 20

Pan American Games appearances (overview)
- 1951; 1955; 1959; 1963; 1967; 1971; 1975; 1979; 1983; 1987; 1991; 1995; 1999; 2003; 2007; 2011; 2015; 2019; 2023

Puerto Rico is scheduled to compete at the 2023 Pan American Games in Santiago, Chile from October 20 to November 5, 2023. This was Puerto Rico's 19th appearance at the Pan American Games, having competed at every Games since the inaugural edition in 1951.

Archer Jean Pizarro and judoka María Pérez were the country's flagbearers during the opening ceremony. Meanwhile, Pizzarro and karateka Janessa Fonseca were the country's flagbearers during the closing ceremony.

== Medalists ==
The following Puerto Rican competitors won medals at the games. In the by discipline sections below, medalists' names are bolded.

| Medal | Name | Sport | Event | Date |
|---|---|---|---|---|
| Gold | Adriana Díaz | Table tennis | Women's singles | November 1 |
| Gold | Jean Pizarro | Archery | Men's individual compound | November 4 |
| Gold | Janessa Fonseca | Karate | Women's –61 kg | November 4 |
| Silver | María Pérez | Judo | Women's –70 kg | October 29 |
| Silver | Sairy Colón | Judo | Women's –78 kg | October 30 |
| Silver | Alysbeth Félix | Athletics | Women's heptathlon | November 2 |
| Silver | Luis Castro | Athletics | Men's high jump | November 3 |
| Silver | Puerto Rico women's national softball team: Taran Alvelo; Aleimalee López; Brianna Roberts; Nayah Pola; Yessenia López; Jena Cozza; Kathyria García; Aleshia Ocasio; Camille Ortiz; Alyssa Rivera; Madison Simon; Samantha Delhoyo; Karla Claudio; Tatianna Roman; Gianna Mancha; Janelle Martínez | Softball | Women's tournament | November 4 |
| Silver | Adriana Díaz; Melanie Díaz; Brianna Burgos | Table tennis | Women's team | November 5 |
| Bronze | Luis Colón | Taekwondo | Men's individual poomsae | October 21 |
| Bronze | Arelis Medina | Taekwondo | Women's individual poomsae | October 21 |
| Bronze | Luis Colón; Arelis Medina | Taekwondo | Mixed poomsae pairs | October 22 |
| Bronze | Steven Piñeiro | Roller sports | Men's skateboarding park | October 22 |
| Bronze | Nelson Guilbe | Gymnastics | Men's pommel horse | October 24 |
| Bronze | Ashleyann Lozada | Boxing | Women's –57 kg | October 26 |
| Bronze | Mariecarmen Rivera | Surfing | Women's SUP race | October 30 |
| Bronze | Adriana Díaz; Melanie Díaz | Table tennis | Women's doubles | October 31 |
| Bronze | Darian Cruz | Wrestling | Men's freestyle 57 kg | November 1 |
| Bronze | Joey Silva | Wrestling | Men's freestyle 65 kg | November 2 |
| Bronze | Cristian Azcona | Bowling | Men's singles | November 5 |

== Competitors ==
The following is the list of number of competitors (per gender) participating at the games per sport/discipline.

| Sport | Men | Women | Total |
|---|---|---|---|
| Archery | 2 | 2 | 4 |
| Basketball | 16 | 16 | 32 |
| Bowling | 3 | 3 | 6 |
| Boxing | 3 | 3 | 6 |
| Canoeing | 2 | 0 | 2 |
| Cycling | 1 | 0 | 1 |
| Equestrian | | | 6 |
| Fencing | 2 | 1 | 3 |
| Golf | 1 | 1 | 2 |
| Gymnastics | 5 | 5 | 10 |
| Handball | 0 | 14 | 14 |
| Karate | 1 | 1 | 2 |
| Roller sports | 2 | 1 | 3 |
| Sailing | 3 | 2 | 5 |
| Shooting | 7 | 7 | 14 |
| Softball | 0 | 18 | 18 |
| Sport climbing | 0 | 1 | 1 |
| Surfing | 2 | 2 | 4 |
| Table tennis | 3 | 3 | 6 |
| Taekwondo | 4 | 4 | 8 |
| Triathlon | 1 | 1 | 2 |
| Water polo | 12 | 12 | 24 |
| Weightlifting | 3 | 3 | 6 |
| Wrestling | 8 | 1 | 9 |
| Total | 81 | 103 | 184 |

== Archery ==
Puerto Rico qualified two archers during the 2022 Pan American Archery Championships. Puerto Rico also qualified two archers during the 2023 Copa Merengue.

== Athletics ==
Men
Track & road events

| Athlete | Event | Semifinal | | Final | |
| Athlete | Event | Time | Rank | Time | Rank |
|---|---|---|---|---|---|
| Diego Gonzalez | 100 m | | | | |
| John Rivera, Jr. | 800 m | | | | |
| Ryan Sánchez | 800 m | | | | |
| Robert Napolitano | 1500 m | —N/a | | | |
| Hector Pagan | 5000 m | —N/a | | | |
| Hector Pagan | 10,000 m | —N/a | | | |

Field events

| Athlete | Event | Result | Rank |
|---|---|---|---|
| Luis Castro | High jump | | |
| Jerome Vega | Hammer throw | | |

Women
Track & road events

| Athlete | Event | Semifinal | | Final | |
| Athlete | Event | Time | Rank | Time | Rank |
|---|---|---|---|---|---|
| Aziza Ayoub | 800 m | | | | |
| Paola Vasquez | 100 m hurdles | | | | |
| Grace Claxton | 400 m hurdles | | | | |
| Alondra Negron | 3000 m steeplechase | —N/a | | | |
| Beverly Ramos | Marathon | —N/a | | 2:46:22 | 11 |

Field events

| Athlete | Event | Result | Rank |
|---|---|---|---|
| Paola Fernandez | Long jump | | |
| Viviana Quintana | Pole vault | | |
| Sophia Rivera | Javelin throw | | |

Combined event – Heptathlon

| Athlete | Event | 100H | HJ | SP | 200 m | LJ | JT | 800 m | Total | Rank |
|---|---|---|---|---|---|---|---|---|---|---|
| Alysbeth Félix | Result | | | | | | | | | |
| Alysbeth Félix | Points | | | | | | | | | |

== Basketball ==
=== 5x5 ===
| Team | Event | Preliminary round | | | | Semifinal | Final / BM | |
| Team | Event | Opposition Result | Opposition Result | Opposition Result | Rank | Opposition Result | Opposition Result | Rank |
|---|---|---|---|---|---|---|---|---|
| Puerto Rico men | Men's tournament | Chile | Mexico | Brazil | | | | |
| Puerto Rico women | Women's tournament | Chile; L 60–86 | Cuba; W 72–69 | Argentina; L 75–77 | 4 | Did not advance | 7th place game Mexico; W 75–70 | 7 |

==== Men's tournament ====
Roster

Puerto Rico men's basketball team roster
Players
Coaches

| Pos. | No. | Name | Age – Date of birth | Height | Club | Ctr. |
|---|---|---|---|---|---|---|
| | | Tjader Fernandez | – | | Santos de San Luis | (Mexico) |
| | | Luis Hernandez | – | | Atléticos de San Germán | (Puerto Rico) |
| | | Josue Erazo | – | | Santos de San Luis | (Mexico) |
| | | Ismael Cruz | – | | Correcaminos UAT | (Mexico) |
| | | Isaiah Brown | – | | Orlando Christian Prep | (United States) |
| | | Brandon Boyd | – | | Cimarrones del Chocó | (Colombia) |
| | | Jordan Cintrón | – | | Santos de San Luis | (Mexico) |
| | | Alexander Kappos | – | | Abejas de León | (Mexico) |
| | | Wilfredo Rodriguez | – | | Corsarios | (Colombia) |
| | | Alejandro Aviles | – | | Dream City Christian | (United States) |
| | | Alexander Morales Jr. | – | | Osceola Magic | (United States) |
| | | Christian Negron | – | | Panteras de Aguascalientes | (Mexico) |

Head coach

Assistant coach(es)

Legend

- (C) Team captain
- Club – describes current club
- Age – describes age
  on 31 July 2023

Preliminary round

| Pos | Team | Pld | W | L | PF | PA | PD | Pts | Qualification |
|---|---|---|---|---|---|---|---|---|---|
| 1 | Brazil | 3 | 3 | 0 | 240 | 166 | +74 | 6 | Semifinals |
| 2 | Mexico | 3 | 1 | 2 | 195 | 209 | −14 | 4 (Note: Head to head record: Mexico 1−1 (+6), Chile 1−1 (0), Puerto Rico 1−1 (−6)) | Semifinals |
| 3 | Chile (H) | 3 | 1 | 2 | 172 | 223 | −51 | 4 | Fifth place game |
| 4 | Puerto Rico | 3 | 1 | 2 | 211 | 220 | −9 | 4 | Seventh place game |

Source: Santiago 2023
(H) Hosts
Notes:

31 October 2023
20:00

Boxscore

| Chile | 66–70 | Puerto Rico |
Scoring by quarter: 18–14, 24–17, 15–20, 9–19
| Pts: Carvacho 16; Rebs: Carvacho 11; Asts: Morales 6 | | Pts: Vaughn 14; Rebs: four players 5 Asts: Ortiz 5 |

Multisport Complex 1, Santiago
Referees: Julio Anaya (PAN), Michael Scott (CAN), Franco Anselmo (ARG)

1 November 2023
17:30

Boxscore

| Puerto Rico | 72–82 | Mexico |
Scoring by quarter: 12–25, 24–20, 21–13, 15–24
| Pts: Cruz 23; Rebs: Medina 7 Asts: Boyd 5 | | Pts: Montano 24; Rebs: Ávalos 8 Asts: Ávalos 5 |

Multisport Complex 1, Santiago
Referees: Leonardo Zalazar (ARG), Kristian Páez (ECU), Michael Scott (CAN)

2 November 2023
17:30

Boxscore

| Brazil | 72–69 | Puerto Rico |
Scoring by quarter: 19–15, 13–21, 21–17, 19–16
| Pts: Dias 17; Rebs: Fuzaro 6 Asts: Corazza 6 | | Pts: Boyd 18; Rebs: Cintron 9 Asts: three players 3 |

Multisport Complex 1, Santiago
Referees: Andrés Maina (URU), Carlos Londono (COL), Kevin Lei (CAN)

==== Women's tournament ====
Roster

Puerto Rico women's basketball team roster
Players
Coaches

| Pos. | No. | Name | Age – Date of birth | Height | Club | Ctr. |
|---|---|---|---|---|---|---|
| | | Tayra Melendez | – | | Gigantes de Carolina | (Puerto Rico) |
| | | Charity Harris | – | | Gigantes de Carolina | (Puerto Rico) |
| | | Arielle Gonzalez-Varner | – | | Cangrejeras de Santurce | (Puerto Rico) |
| | | Pamela Rosado | – | | Montañeras de Morovis | (Puerto Rico) |
| | | Abeliz Rodriguez | – |
| | | Ashley Torres | – | | Atenienses de Manatí | (Puerto Rico) |
| | | Sofia Roma | – | | Montañeras de Morovis | (Puerto Rico) |
| | | Narimar Vargas | – | | Cangrejeras de Santurce | (Puerto Rico) |
| | | Kaela Hilaire | – | | Atenienses de Manatí | (Puerto Rico) |
| | | Katie Villarini | – | | Montañeras de Morovis | (Puerto Rico) |
| | | Isalys Quinones | – | | Montañeras de Morovis | (Puerto Rico) |
| | | Jacqueline Benitez | – | | Explosivos de Moca | (Puerto Rico) |

Head coach

- (Puerto Rico) Jerry Batista

Assistant coach(es)

Legend

- (C) Team captain
- Club – describes current club
- Age – describes age
  on 31 July 2023

Preliminary round

| Pos | Team | Pld | W | L | PF | PA | PD | Pts | Qualification |
|---|---|---|---|---|---|---|---|---|---|
| 1 | Cuba | 3 | 2 | 1 | 223 | 194 | +29 | 5 (Note: Cuba 86–74 Argentina) | Semifinals |
| 2 | Argentina | 3 | 2 | 1 | 238 | 232 | +6 | 5 | Semifinals |
| 3 | Chile (H) | 3 | 1 | 2 | 205 | 215 | −10 | 4 (Note: Chile 86–60 Puerto Rico) | Fifth place game |
| 4 | Puerto Rico | 3 | 1 | 2 | 207 | 232 | −25 | 4 | Seventh place game |

Source: Santiago 2023
(H) Hosts
Notes:

25 October 2023
20:00

Boxscore

| Chile | 86–60 | Puerto Rico |
Scoring by quarter: 22–20, 28–18, 24–9, 12–13
| Pts: three players 13; Rebs: Cortés 8 Asts: Cousiño 7 | | Pts: Benítez 17; Rebs: Meléndez 7 Asts: Harris 4 |

Multisport Complex 1, Santiago
Referees: Andrés Bartel (URU), Alan Dos Santos (BRA), Kevin Lei (CAN)

26 October 2023
17:30

Boxscore

| Puerto Rico | 72–69 | Cuba |
Scoring by quarter: 10–26, 17–16, 20–16, 25–12
| Pts: Rosado 20; Rebs: Quiñones 9 Asts: Meléndez 7 | | Pts: Armentero 16; Rebs: Claro 9 Asts: three players 3 |

Multisport Complex 1, Santiago
Referees: Julio Anaya (PAN), Daniel García (VEN), Orlando Varela (HON)

27 October 2023
17:30

Boxscore

| Puerto Rico | 75–77 | Argentina |
Scoring by quarter: 29–30, 14–17, 16–14, 16–16
| Pts: Benítez, Quiñones 21; Rebs: Quiñones 9 Asts: Hilaire 5 | | Pts: Suárez 22; Rebs: Gentinetta, Jourdheuil 7 Asts: Gentinetta 4 |

Multisport Complex 1, Santiago
Referees: Daniel García (VEN), Fernando Cavalcante (BRA), Kevin Lei (CAN)

7th place game

28 October 2023
10:30

Boxscore

| Puerto Rico | 75–70 | Mexico |
Scoring by quarter: 13–22, 17–17, 22–19, 23–12
| Pts: Rosado 21; Rebs: Roma 8 Asts: Rosado 4 | | Pts: Lara 17; Rebs: Ramos 7 Asts: Ramírez 4 |

Multisport Complex 1, Santiago
Referees: Leonardo Zalazar (ARG), Tiago dos Santos (BRA), Orlando Varela (HON)

== Bowling ==
Puerto Rico qualified a team of three men and three women.

== Boxing ==
Puerto Rico qualified 6 boxers (three men and three women).

| Athlete | Event | Round of 32 | Round of 16 | Quarterfinals | Semifinals | Final | |
| Athlete | Event | Opposition Result | Opposition Result | Opposition Result | Opposition Result | Opposition Result | Rank |
|---|---|---|---|---|---|---|---|
| Caleb Tirado | Men's –57 kg | —N/a | González (COL); L 1–4 | Did not advance | | | |
| Ángel Llanos | Men's –71 kg | Jones (USA); L 0–4 | Did not advance | | | | |
| Eliezer Brito | Men's -80 kg | —N/a | Cox (BAR); L RSC | Did not advance | | | |
| Gracemarie Quiles | Women's –50 kg | —N/a | Cárdenas (CRC); L 1–4 | Did not advance | | | |
| Ashleyann Lozada | Women's –57 kg | —N/a | Montiel (PAR); W 5–0 | Al-Ahmadieh (CAN); W 5–0 | Arboleda (COL); L 2–3 | Did not advance | 3rd place, bronze medalist(s) |
| Stephanie Piñeiro | Women's –66 kg | —N/a | Álvarez (VEN); W 5–0 | Camilo (COL); L 1–4 | Did not advance | | |

== Canoeing ==
=== Sprint ===
Puerto Rico qualified a total of two male sprint athletes.

Men

| Athlete | Event | Heat | | Semifinal | | Final | |
| Athlete | Event | Time | Rank | Time | Rank | Time | Rank |
|---|---|---|---|---|---|---|---|
| Eddy Berly | K-1 1000 m | | | | | | |
| Rodrigo Marcano; Eddy Berly | K-2 500 m | | | | | | |

== Cycling ==
=== Mountain biking ===
| Athlete | Event | Time | Rank |
|---|---|---|---|
| Georwill Pérez | Men's Cross-country | 1:25:20 | 11 |

== Diving ==
Women

| Athlete | Event | Preliminary | | Final | |
| Athlete | Event | Points | Rank | Points | Rank |
|---|---|---|---|---|---|
| Maycey Vieta | 10 m Platform | 275.50 | 8 Q | 309.70 | 5 |
| Elizabeth Miclau | 10 m Platform | 233.15 | 14 | Did not advance | |

== Equestrian ==
Puerto Rico qualified one individual rider in show jumping.

=== Jumping ===
| Athlete | Horse | Event | Qualification | | | | | | Final | | | | | |
| Athlete | Horse | Event | Round 1 | | Round 2 | | Total | | Round 1 | | Round 2 | | Total | |
| Athlete | Horse | Event | Faults | Rank | Faults | Rank | Faults | Rank | Faults | Rank | Faults | Rank | Faults | Rank |
|---|---|---|---|---|---|---|---|---|---|---|---|---|---|---|
| | | Individual | | | | | | | | | | | | |

== Fencing ==
Puerto Rico qualified three fencers (two men and one woman) through the 2022 Pan American Fencing Championships in Asunción, Paraguay.

== Golf ==
Puerto Rico qualified a team of two golfers (one man and one woman).

| Athlete | Event | Round 1 | Round 2 | Round 3 | Round 4 | Total | | |
| Athlete | Event | Score | Score | Score | Score | Score | Par | Rank |
|---|---|---|---|---|---|---|---|---|
| Kelvin Hernández | Men's individual | | | | | | | |
| María Fernanda Torres | Women's individual | | | | | | | |

== Gymnastics ==
=== Artistic ===
Men
Team final & individual qualification

| Athlete | Event | Apparatus | | | | | | Total | |
| Athlete | Event | F | PH | R | V | PB | HB | Score | Rank |
|---|---|---|---|---|---|---|---|---|---|
| Nelson Guilbe | Team | —N/a | 13.866 Q | —N/a | | | | | |
| Jose Lopez | Team | 11.933 | 11.800 | 12.600 | 12.933 | 12.866 | 11.700 | 73.832 | 23 Q |
| Andres Perez | Team | 12.433 | 12.566 | 11.266 | 13.433 | 13.633 | 13.100 | 76.431 | 15 Q |
| Total | Team | 24.366 | 38.232 | 23.866 | 26.366 | 26.499 | 24.800 | 164.129 | 9 |

Individual finals

| Athlete | Event | Apparatus | | | | | | Total | |
| Athlete | Event | F | PH | R | V | PB | HB | Score | Rank |
|---|---|---|---|---|---|---|---|---|---|
| Jose Lopez | All-around | 13.166 | 12.100 | 12.900 | 13.400 | 13.066 | 13.000 | 77.632 | 13 |
| Andres Perez | All-around | 12.866 | 12.233 | 12.366 | 13.200 | 11.700 | 13.100 | 75.465 | 17 |
| Nelson Guilbe | Pommel horse | —N/a | 14.133 | —N/a | | | | | 3rd place, bronze medalist(s) |

Women
Team final & individual qualification

| Athlete | Event | Apparatus | | | | Total | |
| Athlete | Event | V | UB | BB | F | Score | Rank |
|---|---|---|---|---|---|---|---|
| Katyna Alicea | Team | —N/a | | ~~8.600~~ | —N/a | | |
| Alejandra Alvarez | Team | 12.533 | 10.933 | 11.566 | ~~10.400~~ | 45.432 | 26 Q |
| Karelys Diaz | Team | 12.533 | 11.000 | 9.800 | 11.566 | 44.899 | 29 |
| Stella Diaz | Team | 12.366 | 10.733 | 11.700 | 10.866 | 45.665 | 24 Q |
| Ainhoa Herrero | Team | ~~11.000~~ | ~~9.633~~ | —N/a | 11.500 | —N/a | |
| Total | Team | 37.432 | 32.666 | 33.066 | 33.932 | 137.096 | 9 |

Individual finals

| Athlete | Event | Apparatus | | | | Total | |
| Athlete | Event | V | UB | BB | F | Score | Rank |
|---|---|---|---|---|---|---|---|
| Alejandra Alvarez | All-around | 12.633 | 10.600 | 9.133 | 11.266 | 43.632 | 23 |
| Stella Diaz | All-around | 12.033 | 10.066 | 10.900 | 11.433 | 44.432 | 22 |

== Handball ==
Summary

| Team | Event | Group stage | | | | Semifinal / Cl. | Final / BM / Pl. | |
| Team | Event | Opposition Result | Opposition Result | Opposition Result | Rank | Opposition Result | Opposition Result | Rank |
|---|---|---|---|---|---|---|---|---|
| Puerto Rico women | Women's tournament | Argentina; L 17–46 | Canada; W 25–20 | Chile; L 15–23 | 3 | 5-8 semifinal Uruguay; W 30–23 | 5th place game Cuba; W 31–29 | 5 |

=== Women's tournament ===
Puerto Rico qualified a women's team (of 14 athletes) by finishing second in the 2023 Central American and Caribbean Games.

Preliminary round

| Pos | Team | Pld | W | D | L | GF | GA | GD | Pts | Qualification |
|---|---|---|---|---|---|---|---|---|---|---|
| 1 | Argentina | 3 | 3 | 0 | 0 | 105 | 42 | +63 | 6 | Semifinals |
| 2 | Chile (H) | 3 | 2 | 0 | 1 | 61 | 57 | +4 | 4 | Semifinals |
| 3 | Puerto Rico | 3 | 1 | 0 | 2 | 57 | 89 | −32 | 2 | 5–8th place semifinals |
| 4 | Canada | 3 | 0 | 0 | 3 | 44 | 79 | −35 | 0 | 5–8th place semifinals |

Source: Santiago 2023
Rules for classification: 1) points; 2) head-to-head points; 3) head-to-head goal difference; 4) head-to-head goals scored; 5) goal difference; 6) goals scored; 7) draw.
(H) Hosts

| 24 October 2023; 17:30 | Argentina | 46–17 | Puerto Rico | Gimnasio Polideportivo de Viña del Mar; Referees: Corrêa, Corrêa (BRA) |
| 24 October 2023; 17:30 | Dalle Crode, Karsten 7 | (21–9) | three players 3 | Gimnasio Polideportivo de Viña del Mar; Referees: Corrêa, Corrêa (BRA) |
| 24 October 2023; 17:30 | 2× (suspension) | Report | 5× (suspension) 1× (red card) | Gimnasio Polideportivo de Viña del Mar; Referees: Corrêa, Corrêa (BRA) |

| 25 October 2023; 20:00 | Puerto Rico | 25–20 | Canada | Gimnasio Polideportivo de Viña del Mar; Referees: Corrêa, Corrêa (BRA) |
| 25 October 2023; 20:00 | Cabrera, Hiraldo 6 | (15–7) | Zimmer 6 | Gimnasio Polideportivo de Viña del Mar; Referees: Corrêa, Corrêa (BRA) |
| 25 October 2023; 20:00 | 1× (suspension) | Report | 2× (suspension) | Gimnasio Polideportivo de Viña del Mar; Referees: Corrêa, Corrêa (BRA) |

| 26 October 2023; 20:00 | Puerto Rico | 15–23 | Chile | Gimnasio Polideportivo de Viña del Mar; Referees: García, Paolantoni (ARG) |
| 26 October 2023; 20:00 | Benítez, García 4 | (12–9) | three players 4 | Gimnasio Polideportivo de Viña del Mar; Referees: García, Paolantoni (ARG) |
| 26 October 2023; 20:00 | 1× (yellow card) 1× (suspension) 1× (red card) | Report | 1× (yellow card) 1× (suspension) | Gimnasio Polideportivo de Viña del Mar; Referees: García, Paolantoni (ARG) |

5th-8th semifinal

| 28 October 2023; 12:30 | Puerto Rico | 30–23 | Uruguay | Gimnasio Polideportivo de Viña del Mar; Referees: Corrêa, Corrêa (BRA) |
| 28 October 2023; 12:30 | Hiraldo, Benítez 6 | (14–8) | Barreiro 10 | Gimnasio Polideportivo de Viña del Mar; Referees: Corrêa, Corrêa (BRA) |
| 28 October 2023; 12:30 | 1× (yellow card) 4× (suspension) | Report | 3× (suspension) | Gimnasio Polideportivo de Viña del Mar; Referees: Corrêa, Corrêa (BRA) |

5th place game

| 29 October 2023; 14:30 | Cuba | 29–31 | Puerto Rico | Gimnasio Polideportivo de Viña del Mar; Referees: García, Paolantoni (ARG) |
| 29 October 2023; 14:30 | González 7 | (13–12) | Ceballos 10 | Gimnasio Polideportivo de Viña del Mar; Referees: García, Paolantoni (ARG) |
| 29 October 2023; 14:30 | 1× (yellow card) 5× (suspension) | Report | 2× (suspension) | Gimnasio Polideportivo de Viña del Mar; Referees: García, Paolantoni (ARG) |

== Judo ==
Puerto Rico has qualified 3 female judokas.

| Athlete | Event | Round of 16 | Quarterfinal | Semifinal | Repechage | Final / BM | |
| Athlete | Event | Opposition Result | Opposition Result | Opposition Result | Opposition Result | Opposition Result | Rank |
|---|---|---|---|---|---|---|---|
| Francine Echevarría | Women's –52 kg | Etienne (HAI); W 10–00 | Martinez (MEX); L 00–10 | Did not advance | Diaz (VEN); W 01–00 | Bronze medal final Delgado (USA); L 00–10 | =5 |
| María Pérez | Women's –70 kg | Bye | Bonilla (COL); W 10–00 | Rodríguez (VEN); W 10–00 | Bye | Gómez (CUB); L 00–10 | 2nd place, silver medalist(s) |
| Sairy Colón | Women's –78 kg | Ramos (BRA) | | | | | |

== Karate ==
Puerto Rico qualified two karatekas (one man and one woman) at the 2021 Junior Pan American Games and the 2023 Pan American Championships.

Kumite

| Athlete | Event | Round robin | | | | Semifinal | Final | |
| Athlete | Event | Opposition Result | Opposition Result | Opposition Result | Rank | Opposition Result | Opposition Result | Rank |
|---|---|---|---|---|---|---|---|---|
| Tomás Greer | Men's −84 kg | | | | | | | |
| Janessa Fonseca | Women's −61 kg | | | | | | | |

== Roller sports ==
Skateboarding
Puerto Rico qualified a team of three athletes (two men and one woman) in skateboarding.

| Athlete | Event | Score | Rank |
|---|---|---|---|
| Steven Piñeiro⁣ | Men's park | 83.24 | 3rd place, bronze medalist(s) |
| Emanuel Santiago | Men's street | 144.65 | 7 |
| Vianez Collazo | Women's street | 102.36 | 8 |

== Sailing ==
Puerto Rico has qualified 4 boats for a total of 5 sailors.

== Shooting ==
Puerto Rico qualified a total of 14 shooters in the 2022 Americas Shooting Championships.

== Softball ==
Puerto Rico qualified a women's team (of 18 athletes) by virtue of its campaign in the 2022 Pan American Championships.

Summary

| Team | Event | Preliminary round | | | | Super round | | | Final / BM / Pl. | |
| Team | Event | Opposition Result | Opposition Result | Opposition Result | Rank | Opposition Result | Opposition Result | Rank | Opposition Result | Rank |
|---|---|---|---|---|---|---|---|---|---|---|
| Puerto Rico women | Women's tournament | Peru | Cuba | Canada | | | | | | |

Preliminary round

| Pos | Team | Pld | W | L | RF | RA | PCT | GB | Qualification |
|---|---|---|---|---|---|---|---|---|---|
| 1 | Puerto Rico | 3 | 3 | 0 | 8 | 3 | 1.000 | — | Super Round |
| 2 | Canada | 3 | 2 | 1 | 16 | 3 | .667 | 1 | Super Round |
| 3 | Cuba | 3 | 1 | 2 | 5 | 6 | .333 | 2 | Fifth place game |
| 4 | Peru | 3 | 0 | 3 | 0 | 17 | .000 | 3 | Seventh place game |

Source: Santiago 2023 and WBSC Americas

| October 30; 10:00 | Peru | 0–3 | Puerto Rico | Baseball and Softball Center, Santiago |
| October 30; 10:00 | | Boxscore | | Baseball and Softball Center, Santiago |

| October 31; 13:00 | Cuba | 1–2 | Puerto Rico | Baseball and Softball Center, Santiago |
| October 31; 13:00 | | Boxscore | | Baseball and Softball Center, Santiago |

| November 1; 16:00 | Puerto Rico | 3–2 | Canada | Baseball and Softball Center, Santiago |
| November 1; 16:00 | | Boxscore | | Baseball and Softball Center, Santiago |

== Sport climbing ==
Puerto Rico qualified a female sport climber by virtue of the IFSC world rankings.

Boulder & lead

| Athlete | Event | Qualification | | | | | | Final | | | | | |
| Athlete | Event | Bouldering | | Lead | | Total | | Bouldering | | Lead | | Total | |
| Athlete | Event | Points | Rank | Points | Rank | Points | Rank | Points | Rank | Points | Rank | Points | Rank |
|---|---|---|---|---|---|---|---|---|---|---|---|---|---|
| Elizabeth Sepúlveda | Women's | 24.5 | 19 | 26.1 | =8 | 50.6 | 18 | Did not advance | | | | | |

== Surfing ==
Puerto Rico qualified four surfers (two men and two women).

Artistic

| Athlete | Event | Round 1 | | Round 2 | | Round 3 | Round 4 | Repechage 1 | Repechage 2 | Repechage 3 | Repechage 4 | BM | Final / BM | |
| Athlete | Event | Score | Rank | Score | Rank | Opposition Result | Opposition Result | Opposition Result | Opposition Result | Opposition Result | Opposition Result | Opposition Result | Opposition Result | Rank |
|---|---|---|---|---|---|---|---|---|---|---|---|---|---|---|
| Max Torres | Men's stand up paddleboard | 10.13 | 2 Q | 11.60 | 2 Q | Schweitzer (USA); L 7.20–15.07 | Did not advance | Bye | | Spencer (CAN); L 11.27–11.33 | Did not advance | | | |

Race

| Athlete | Event | Time | Rank |
|---|---|---|---|
| Ricardo Avila | Men's stand up paddleboard | | |
| Maricarmen Rivera | Women's stand up paddleboard | | |

== Table tennis ==
Puerto Rico qualified a full team of six athletes (three men and three women) through the 2023 Caribbean Championships.

Men

| Athlete | Event | Group stage | | | Round of 32 | Round of 16 | Quarterfinal | Semifinal | Final / BM | |
| Athlete | Event | Opposition Result | Opposition Result | Rank | Opposition Result | Opposition Result | Opposition Result | Opposition Result | Opposition Result | Rank |
|---|---|---|---|---|---|---|---|---|---|---|
| Brian Afanador | Singles | —N/a | | | Gatica (EAI) | | | | | |
| Daniel González | Singles | —N/a | | | Britton (GUY) | | | | | |
| Brian Afanador; Daniel González | Doubles | —N/a | | | | Bye | Campos / Periera (CUB); L 1–4 | Did not advance | | |
| Brian Afanador; Daniel González; Ángel Naranjo | Team | | | | —N/a | | | | | |

Women

| Athlete | Event | Group stage | | | First round | Second round | Quarterfinal | Semifinal | Final / BM | |
| Athlete | Event | Opposition Result | Opposition Result | Rank | Opposition Result | Opposition Result | Opposition Result | Opposition Result | Opposition Result | Rank |
|---|---|---|---|---|---|---|---|---|---|---|
| Adriana Díaz | Singles | —N/a | | | Téllez (COL) | | | | | |
| Melanie Díaz | Singles | —N/a | | | Crespo (CUB) | | | | | |
| Adriana Díaz; Melanie Díaz | Doubles | —N/a | | | | Bye | Corder / Enriquez (EAI); W 4–0 | B Takahashi / G Takahashi (BRA) | | |
| Brianna Burgos; Adriana Díaz; Melanie Díaz | Team | | | | —N/a | | | | | |

Mixed

| Athlete | Event | Round of 16 | Quarterfinal | Semifinal | Final / BM | |
| Athlete | Event | Opposition Result | Opposition Result | Opposition Result | Opposition Result | Rank |
|---|---|---|---|---|---|---|
| Brian Afanador; Adriana Díaz | Doubles | F Duffoo / I Duffoo (PER); W 4–0 | Burgos / Vega (CHI); L 2–4 | Did not advance | | |

== Taekwondo ==
Puerto Rico qualified 8 athletes (four men and four women) during the Pan American Games Qualification Tournament.

Men

| Athlete | Event | Round of 16 | Quarterfinal | Semifinal | Repechage | Final / BM | |
| Athlete | Event | Opposition Result | Opposition Result | Opposition Result | Opposition Result | Opposition Result | Rank |
|---|---|---|---|---|---|---|---|
| Luis de Jesus | –68 kg | Paz (COL); L 0–2 | Did not advance | | | | |
| Alejandro Gonzalez | –80 kg | Robleto (NCA); L 1–2 | Did not advance | | | | |
| Luis de Jesus; Alejandro Gonzalez; Edrick Morales | Team | Ecuador; L 32–72 | Did not advance | | —N/a | Did not advance | |
| Luis Colón | Poomsae | Bye | Farías (CHI); W 7.410–7.360 | Ortega (NCA); L 7.110–7.760 | —N/a | Did not advance | 3rd place, bronze medalist(s) |

Women

| Athlete | Event | Round of 16 | Quarterfinal | Semifinal | Repechage | Final / BM | |
| Athlete | Event | Opposition Result | Opposition Result | Opposition Result | Opposition Result | Opposition Result | Rank |
|---|---|---|---|---|---|---|---|
| Victoria Stambaugh | –49 kg | Sendra (ARG); L 0–2 | Did not advance | | —N/a | Did not advance | |
| Naishka Roman | –67 kg | Mina (ECU); L 0–2 | Did not advance | | | | |
| Crystal Weekes | +67 kg | Bye | Rodríguez (DOM); W 2–0 | Gorman-Shore (USA); L 0–2 | —N/a | Bronze medal final Heredia (MEX); L 1–2 | =5 |
| Naishka Roman; Victoria Stambaugh; Crystal Weekes | Team | Venezuela; L 66–72 | Did not advance | | —N/a | Did not advance | |
| Arelis Medina | Poomsae | —N/a | Castillo (PER); W 7.490–7.230 | Higueros (EAI); L 7.390–7.590 | —N/a | Did not advance | 3rd place, bronze medalist(s) |

Mixed

| Athlete | Event | Score | Rank |
|---|---|---|---|
| Luis Colón; Arelis Medina | Poomsae pair | 7.600 | 3rd place, bronze medalist(s) |

== Triathlon ==
Puerto Rico qualified a team of two triathletes (one man and one woman): Janarold Martínez and Zoe Adam.

== Water polo ==
Summary

| Team | Event | Group stage | | | | Semifinal | Final / BM / Pl. | |
| Team | Event | Opposition Result | Opposition Result | Opposition Result | Rank | Opposition Result | Opposition Result | Rank |
|---|---|---|---|---|---|---|---|---|
| Puerto Rico men | Men's tournament | Brazil | United States | Mexico | | | | |
| Puerto Rico women | Women's tournament | Brazil | United States | Chile | | | | |

=== Men's tournament ===
Puerto Rico qualified a men's team (of 12 athletes) by reaching the final of the 2023 Central American and Caribbean Games.

Group A

| Pos | Team | Pld | W | PSW | PSL | L | GF | GA | GD | Pts | Qualification |
|---|---|---|---|---|---|---|---|---|---|---|---|
| 1 | United States | 3 | 3 | 0 | 0 | 0 | 82 | 18 | +64 | 9 | Quarterfinals |
| 2 | Brazil | 3 | 2 | 0 | 0 | 1 | 46 | 39 | +7 | 6 | Quarterfinals |
| 3 | Puerto Rico | 3 | 1 | 0 | 0 | 2 | 29 | 58 | −29 | 3 | Quarterfinals |
| 4 | Mexico | 3 | 0 | 0 | 0 | 3 | 24 | 66 | −42 | 0 | Quarterfinals |

Source: Santiago 2023
Rules for classification: 1) points; 2) head-to-head points; 3) head-to-head goal difference; 4) head-to-head number of goals scored; 5) goal difference.

| 30 October 2023; 15:00 | Report | Brazil | 18–5 | Puerto Rico | Aquatic Center, Santiago; Referees: Hinds (NED) |
| 30 October 2023; 15:00 | Report | Score by quarters: 5–2, 3–2, 5–1, 5–0 | | | Aquatic Center, Santiago; Referees: Hinds (NED) |
| 30 October 2023; 15:00 | Report | Coutinho, P. Real 4 | Goals | Loubriel 2 | Aquatic Center, Santiago; Referees: Hinds (NED) |

| 31 October 2023; 15:00 | Report | United States | 28–9 | Puerto Rico | Aquatic Center, Santiago; Referees: Ernesto Hernández Toledo (CUB); Daniel Federico Daners (URU) |
| 31 October 2023; 15:00 | Report | Score by quarters: 8–3, 6–1, 6–3, 8–2 | | | Aquatic Center, Santiago; Referees: Ernesto Hernández Toledo (CUB); Daniel Federico Daners (URU) |
| 31 October 2023; 15:00 | Report | R. Dodd 7 | Goals | Loubriel 3 | Aquatic Center, Santiago; Referees: Ernesto Hernández Toledo (CUB); Daniel Federico Daners (URU) |

| 1 November 2023; 18:00 | Report | Puerto Rico | 15–12 | Mexico | Aquatic Center, Santiago; Referees: Jose Garcia Soto (VEN); German Moller (ARG) |
| 1 November 2023; 18:00 | Report | Score by quarters: 5–4, 5–6, 2–1, 3–1 | | | Aquatic Center, Santiago; Referees: Jose Garcia Soto (VEN); German Moller (ARG) |
| 1 November 2023; 18:00 | Report | D. Zayas 4 | Goals | Estrada 4 | Aquatic Center, Santiago; Referees: Jose Garcia Soto (VEN); German Moller (ARG) |

=== Women's tournament ===
Puerto Rico qualified a women's team (of 12 athletes) through the 2022 CCCAN Championships.

Group B

| Pos | Team | Pld | W | PSW | PSL | L | GF | GA | GD | Pts | Qualification |
|---|---|---|---|---|---|---|---|---|---|---|---|
| 1 | United States | 3 | 3 | 0 | 0 | 0 | 89 | 3 | +86 | 9 | Quarterfinals |
| 2 | Brazil | 3 | 2 | 0 | 0 | 1 | 53 | 34 | +19 | 6 | Quarterfinals |
| 3 | Puerto Rico | 3 | 1 | 0 | 0 | 2 | 21 | 60 | −39 | 3 | Quarterfinals |
| 4 | Chile (H) | 3 | 0 | 0 | 0 | 3 | 14 | 80 | −66 | 0 | Quarterfinals |

Source: Santiago 2023
Rules for classification: 1) points; 2) head-to-head points; 3) head-to-head goal difference; 4) head-to-head number of goals scored; 5) goal difference.
(H) Host

| 30 October 2023; 9:30 | Report | Brazil | 19–7 | Puerto Rico | Aquatic Center, Santiago; Referees: German Moller (ARG); Wilhem Keman (NED) |
| 30 October 2023; 9:30 | Report | Score by quarters: 4–3, 6–2, 6–1, 3–1 | | | Aquatic Center, Santiago; Referees: German Moller (ARG); Wilhem Keman (NED) |
| 30 October 2023; 9:30 | Report | Leão 4 | Goals | Montalvo, Melendez 2 | Aquatic Center, Santiago; Referees: German Moller (ARG); Wilhem Keman (NED) |

| 31 October 2023; 9:30 | Report | United States | 29–0 | Puerto Rico | Aquatic Center, Santiago; Referees: Hélène Painchaud (CAN); Xavier Villanueva (CHI) |
| 31 October 2023; 9:30 | Report | Score by quarters: 8–0, 8–0, 7–0, 6–0 | | | Aquatic Center, Santiago; Referees: Hélène Painchaud (CAN); Xavier Villanueva (CHI) |
| 31 October 2023; 9:30 | Report | Steffens 6 | Goals | | Aquatic Center, Santiago; Referees: Hélène Painchaud (CAN); Xavier Villanueva (CHI) |

| 1 November 2023; 12:30 | Report | Puerto Rico | 14–12 | Chile | Aquatic Center, Santiago; Referees: Ernesto Hernández Toledo (CUB); Jorge Pinski (ARG) |
| 1 November 2023; 12:30 | Report | Score by quarters: 4–4, 3–2, 4–4, 3–2 | | | Aquatic Center, Santiago; Referees: Ernesto Hernández Toledo (CUB); Jorge Pinski (ARG) |
| 1 November 2023; 12:30 | Report | Guzmán 4 | Goals | Sarmiento 4 | Aquatic Center, Santiago; Referees: Ernesto Hernández Toledo (CUB); Jorge Pinski (ARG) |

== Weightlifting ==
Puerto Rico qualified six weightlifters (three per gender).

| Athlete | Event | Snatch | | Clean & jerk | | Total | |
| Athlete | Event | Weight | Rank | Weight | Rank | Weight | Rank |
|---|---|---|---|---|---|---|---|
| Luis Lamenza | Men's –102 kg | 160 | 7 | 180 | 10 | 340 | 9 |
| Omayraliz Ortiz | Women's –49 kg | 68 | 8 | 88 | 8 | 156 | 7 |

== Wrestling ==
Puerto Rico qualified nine wrestlers (eight men and one woman) through the 2022 Pan American Wrestling Championships and the 2023 Pan American Wrestling Championships.

== See also ==
- Puerto Rico at the 2023 Parapan American Games
- Puerto Rico at the 2024 Summer Olympics
