= Breaking at the 2023 Pan American Games – Qualification =

The following is the qualification system for the breaking at the 2023 Pan American Games event and qualified athletes/quotas.

== Qualification system ==
A total of 32 breakdancers will qualify to compete (16 per gender). The host nation is guaranteed one sport per event. The other 15 spots will be awarded through the 2023 Pan American Championships and World Rankings list. A country can qualify a maximum of four athletes (two per gender).

== Qualification summary ==
NOC	Men	Women	Total
Canada	1	1	2
Chile	1	1	2
Colombia	1	1	2
United States	2	2	4
Total: 4 NOCs	16	16	32

== Qualification timeline ==
Events	Date	Venue
2023 Pan American Championships	May 27–28	(Chile) Santiago
WDSF World Rankings	August 5, 2023	—N/a

== Qualification progress ==
Event	Quotas	Men	Women
Host nation	1	Chile	Chile
2023 Pan American Championships	4	Canada; United States; United States; Colombia	Colombia; United States; United States; Canada
WDSF World Rankings	11	Venezuela; Brazil; Brazil; Colombia; Canada; Mexico; Mexico; Chile; Argentina; Dominican Republic; Puerto Rico	Mexico; Canada; Brazil; Brazil; Peru; Argentina; Ecuador; Chile; Peru; Ecuador; El Salvador
Total	16		
