= Brazil at the Pan American Games =

- IOC code: BRA
- NOC: Brazilian Olympic Committee
- Website: www.cob.org.br
- Medals Ranked 4th: Gold 449 Silver 476 Bronze 656 Total 1,581

Pan American Games appearances (overview)
- 1951; 1955; 1959; 1963; 1967; 1971; 1975; 1979; 1983; 1987; 1991; 1995; 1999; 2003; 2007; 2011; 2015; 2019; 2023

Brazil has competed at every edition of the Pan American Games since the first edition of the multi-sport event in 1951.The Brazil Olympic Committee (COB) is the National Olympic Committee for Brazil.

== Hosted Games ==
Brazil has hosted the Pan American Games on two occasions:

Games	Host city	Dates
1963 Pan American Games	São Paulo	April 20 – May 5
2007 Pan American Games	Rio de Janeiro	July 13 – July 29

== Pan American Games ==
=== Medals by games ===
Host country

To sort the tables by host city, total medal count, or any other column, click on the icon next to the column title.

Year	Ref.	Edition	Host city	Rank	Gold	Silver	Bronze	Total
1951		I	(Argentina) Buenos Aires	5th	5	15	12	32
1955		II	Mexico City	7th	2	3	13	18
1959		III	(United States) Chicago	3rd	8	8	6	22
1963		IV	(Brazil) São Paulo ^{[§]}	2nd	14	21	18	53
1967		V	(Canada) Winnipeg	3rd	11	10	5	26
1971		VI	(Colombia) Cali	4th	9	7	14	30
1975		VII	Mexico City	5th	8	13	23	44
1979		VIII	(Puerto Rico) San Juan	5th	9	13	17	39
1983		IX	(Venezuela) Caracas	4th	14	20	23	57
1987		X	(United States) Indianapolis	4th	14	14	33	61
1991		XI	(Cuba) Havana	4th	21	21	37	79
1995		XII	(Argentina) Mar del Plata	6th	18	27	38	83
1999		XIII	(Canada) Winnipeg	4th	25	32	44	101
2003		XIV	(Dominican Republic) Santo Domingo	4th	29	40	54	123
2007		XV	(Brazil) Rio de Janeiro ^{[§]}	3rd	52	40	65	157
2011		XVI	(Mexico) Guadalajara	3rd	48	35	58	141
2015		XVII	(Canada) Toronto	3rd	42	39	60	141
2019		XVIII	(Peru) Lima	2nd	54	45	70	169
2023		XIX	(Chile) Santiago	2nd	66	73	66	205
2027		XX	(Peru) Lima					
Total				4th	449	476	656	1,581

=== Medals by sport ===
Brazilians have won medals in most of the current Pan American Games sports programs. The exceptions are 3x3 basketball, breaking, field hockey, golf, racquetball (the country never participated on this sport), roller speed skating, softball and sport climbing.

Updated after the 2023 Pan American Games

Leading in that sport

Sport	Gold	Silver	Bronze	Total
Athletics	71	66	74	211
Swimming	70	72	105	247
Judo	47	39	64	150
Sailing	42	27	22	91
Gymnastics	38	35	40	113
Table tennis	18	15	17	50
Tennis	18	8	16	42
Canoeing	13	20	19	52
Boxing	12	27	40	79
Karate	11	13	25	49
Basketball	11	6	11	28
Handball	10	5	4	19
Rowing	9	23	16	48
Volleyball	9	11	7	27
Equestrian	9	10	17	36
Roller sports	8	8	10	26
Football	8	4	1	13
Beach volleyball	7	3	4	14
Shooting	6	14	29	49
Triathlon	6	4	2	12
Taekwondo	5	7	14	26
Modern pentathlon	4	5	1	10
Wrestling	3	7	8	18
Weightlifting	3	5	16	24
Surfing	3	4	2	9
Fencing	2	5	19	26
Cycling	1	10	15	26
Water polo	1	7	12	20
Badminton	1	3	9	13
Bowling	1	2	1	4
Water skiing	1	1	2	4
Futsal	1	0	0	1
Diving	0	4	5	9
Archery	0	3	6	9
Squash	0	2	10	12
Baseball	0	1	0	1
Artistic swimming	0	0	9	9
Basque pelota	0	0	2	2
Rugby	0	0	2	2
Totals (39 entries)	449	476	656	1,581

Best results in non-medaling sports:

Summer
Sport	Rank	Athlete	Event & Year
3x3 basketball	4th	Brazil men's team	Men's tournament in 2019
3x3 basketball	4th	Brazil women's team	Women's tournament in 2019
Breaking	6th	Gilberto Araújo	B-Boys in 2023
Breaking	6th	Mayara Collins	B-Girls in 2023
Field hockey	4th	Brazil men's team	Men's tournament in 2015
Golf	7th	Rodrigo Lee	Men's individual in 2023
Racquetball	Never participated		
Roller speed skating	4th	Guilherme Abel Rocha	Men's 200 metres time-trial in 2023
Roller speed skating	4th	Guilherme Abel Rocha	Men's 500 metres + distance in 2023
Softball	4th	Brazil women's team	Women's tournament in 2015
Sport climbing	8th	Pedro Egg	Men's speed in 2023

== Winter Pan American Games ==
=== Medals by games ===
Year	Ref.	Edition	Host city	Rank	Gold	Silver	Bronze	Total
1990		I	(Argentina) Las Leñas	—	0	0	0	0
Total				—	0	0	0	0

== Junior Pan American Games ==
=== Medals by games ===
Year	Ref.	Edition	Host city	Rank	Gold	Silver	Bronze	Total
2021		I	(Colombia) Cali-Valle	1st	59	49	56	164
2025		II	(Paraguay) Asunción	1st	70	50	55	175
Total				1st	129	99	111	339

=== Medals by sport ===
Leading in that sport

Sport	Gold	Silver	Bronze	Total
Swimming	43	27	13	83
Judo	18	2	6	26
Athletics	13	19	15	47
Rhythmic gymnastics	5	6	6	17
Table tennis	5	4	3	12
Skateboarding	4	0	1	5
Volleyball	4	0	0	4
Karate	3	5	6	14
Canoeing sprint	3	3	2	8
Taekwondo	3	1	4	8
Archery	3	1	1	5
Handball	3	0	1	4
Artistic gymnastics	2	6	6	14
Rowing	2	5	4	11
Artistic roller skating	2	3	1	6
Beach volleyball	2	1	0	3
Inline speed skating	2	0	0	2
Wrestling	1	2	6	9
Shooting	1	2	4	7
Badminton	1	2	3	6
Fencing	1	2	3	6
Open water swimming	1	1	1	3
Sailing	1	1	1	3
Trampoline gymnastics	1	1	1	3
Cycling mountain biking	1	0	3	4
Tennis	1	0	2	3
Weightlifting	1	0	2	3
Triathlon	1	0	1	2
Rugby sevens	1	0	0	1
Boxing	0	3	1	4
Squash	0	1	3	4
Cycling BMX racing	0	1	1	2
Artistic swimming	0	0	3	3
Cycling track	0	0	2	2
Diving	0	0	2	2
Cycling BMX freestyle	0	0	1	1
Cycling road	0	0	1	1
Modern pentathlon	0	0	1	1
Totals (38 entries)	129	99	111	339

Best results in non-medaling sports:

Summer
Sport	Rank	Athlete	Event & Year
3x3 basketball	4th	Brazil women's team	Women's tournament in 2025
Field hockey	6th	Brazil men's team	Men's tournament in 2025
Golf	6th	Gustavo Giacometti; Guilherme Ziccardi; Maria Eugênia Peres; Maria Eduarda Rocha	Mixed team in 2025
Water skiing	6th	Livia Sophia Schuler	Women's wakeboard in 2025

== See also ==
- Brazil at the Parapan American Games
- Brazil at the Olympics
- Brazil at the Paralympics
- Brazil at the Universiade
