= Swimming at the 2023 Pan American Games – Men's 100 metre butterfly =

Men's 100 metre butterfly at the 2023 Pan American Games
- Venue: Aquatic Centre
- Date: October 22, 2023
- Competitors: 30 from 23 nations

Medalists
Gold medal	Lukas Miller	United States
Silver medal	Vinicius Lanza	Brazil
Bronze medal	Arsenio Bustos	United States

The men's 100 metre butterfly competition of the swimming events at the 2023 Pan American Games were held on October 22, 2023, at the Aquatic Center in Santiago, Chile.

== Records ==
Prior to this competition, the existing world and Pan American Games records were as follows:

World record	Caeleb Dressel (USA)	49.45	Tokyo, Japan	July 31, 2021
Pan American Games record	Will Lincon (USA)	51.44	Lima, Peru	August 7, 2019

== Results ==
KEY:	QA	Qualified for A final	QB	Qualified for B final	GR	Games record	NR	National record	PB	Personal best	SB	Seasonal best

=== Heats ===
The highest eight scores advance to the final.

Rank	Heat	Lane	Name	Nationality	Time	Notes
1	4	4	Lukas Miller	United States	51.99	QA
2	4	3	Vinicius Lanza	Brazil	52.78	QA
3	3	5	Jorge Otaiza	Venezuela	53.08	QA
4	4	5	Victor Baganha	Brazil	53.11	QA
5	3	4	Arsenio Bustos	United States	53.21	QA
6	2	4	Finlay Knox	Canada	53.33	QA
7	3	3	Ángel Martínez	Mexico	53.95	QA
8	4	6	David Arias	Colombia	53.97	QA
9	4	2	Esnaider Reales	Colombia	53.99	QB
10	3	6	Keir Ogilvie	Canada	54.22	QB
11	2	5	Jorge Iga	Mexico	54.30	QB
12	3	2	Benjamín Schnapp	Chile	54.56	QB
13	2	3	Emil Pérez	Venezuela	54.63	QB
14	2	2	Zarek Wilson	Trinidad and Tobago	54.74	QB
15	2	6	Benjamín Hockin	Paraguay	54.76	QB
16	4	7	Elías Ardiles	Chile	55.04	QB
17	4	1	Esteban Nuñez del Prado	Bolivia	55.10	
18	2	7	Carlos Vasquez	Honduras	55.14	
19	1	6	Mikel Schreuders	Aruba	55.92	
20	3	8	Emmanuel Gadson	Bahamas	56.32	
21	3	1	Jeancarlo Calderón	Panama	56.50	
22	3	7	Jayhan Odlum-Smith	Saint Lucia	56.56	
23	2	8	Sidrell Williams	Jamaica	56.79	
24	4	8	Zackary Gresham	Grenada	56.91	
25	1	4	Christopher Gossmann	Independent Athletes Team	57.02	
26	1	5	Gerald Hernández	Nicaragua	57.90	
27	1	2	Xavier Ventura	El Salvador	58.61	
28	1	3	Irvin Hoost	Suriname	58.76	
29	1	7	Adriel Sanes	Virgin Islands	58.86	
	2	1	Noah Mascoll-Gomes	Antigua and Barbuda	DNS	

=== Final B ===
The B final was held on October 21.

Rank	Lane	Name	Nationality	Time	Notes
9	4	Esnaider Reales	Colombia	53.87	
10	5	Keir Ogilvie	Canada	54.15	
11	3	Benjamín Schnapp	Chile	54.35	
12	7	Benjamín Hockin	Paraguay	54.57	
13	1	Elías Ardiles	Chile	54.60	
14	2	Zarek Wilson	Trinidad and Tobago	54.61	
15	8	Esteban Nuñez del Prado	Bolivia	54.71	
16	6	Emil Pérez	Venezuela	55.08	

=== Final A ===
The A final was held on October 21.

Rank	Lane	Name	Nationality	Time	Notes
1st place, gold medalist(s)	4	Lukas Miller	United States	51.98	
2nd place, silver medalist(s)	5	Vinicius Lanza	Brazil	52.52	
3rd place, bronze medalist(s)	2	Arsenio Bustos	United States	52.60	
4	7	Finlay Knox	Canada	52.89	
5	3	Jorge Otaiza	Venezuela	52.95	
6	6	Victor Baganha	Brazil	53.00	
7	1	Ángel Martínez	Mexico	53.73	
8	8	David Arias	Colombia	53.79	
