= List of Chilean records in speed skating =

The following are the national records in speed skating in Chile.

== Men ==
Event	Record	Athlete	Date	Meet	Place	Ref
500 meters	37.21	Emanuelle Silva	24 October 2025	Fall World Cup Qualifier	Salt Lake City, United States	
500 meters × 2						
1000 meters	1:14.20	Ricardo Verdugo	18 February 2017	Frillensee Cup	Inzell, Germany	
1500 meters	1:55.56	Ricardo Verdugo	19 February 2017	Frillensee Cup	Inzell, Germany	
3000 meters	4:13.52	Claudio Sandoval	22 November 2015	Trainingswedstrijd	Tilburg, Netherlands	
5000 meters	7:06.86	Claudio Sandoval	30 Oktober 2015	Frillensee Cup	Inzell, Germany	
10000 meters	15:13.56	Claudio Sandoval	15 March 2014	Trainingswedstrijd	Tilburg, Netherlands	
Team pursuit (8 laps)						
Sprint combination						
Small combination						
Big combination						

== Women ==
Event	Record	Athlete	Date	Meet	Place	Ref
500 meters	40.96	Maria Jose Moya	24 February 2017	Chilean Single Distances Championships	Inzell, Germany	
500 meters × 2						
1000 meters	1:22.60	Valentina Moya	21 February 2016	Chilean Single Distances Championships	Inzell, Germany	
1500 meters	2:10.32	Viviana Rodriguez	26 February 2017	Chilean Single Distances Championships	Inzell, Germany	
3000 meters	4:32.81	Viviana Rodriguez	22 December 2015	International Race	Inzell, Germany	
5000 meters	8:05.72	Viviana Rodriguez	8 February 2015	Trainingswedstrijd Tilburg	Tilburg, Netherlands	
10000 meters	17:09.65	Viviana Rodriguez	12 March 2016	Trainingswedstrijd Tilburg	Tilburg, Netherlands	
Team pursuit (6 laps)	3:45.88	Paula Ruiz; Daniella Mella; Viviana Rodriguez	27 January 2013	Ploegenachtervolging Eindhoven	Eindhoven, Netherlands	
Sprint combination						
Mini combination						
Small combination						
