= Roller sports at the 2023 Pan American Games – Women's 1,000 metres sprint =

Women's 1,000 metres sprint in roller sports at the 2023 Pan American Games
- Venue: Patinódromo
- Dates: November 4
- Competitors: 12 from 11 nations

Medalists
Gold medal	Gabriela Rueda	Colombia
Silver medal	Gabriela Vargas	Ecuador
Bronze medal	Angy Quintero	Venezuela

The women's speed skating 1,000 metres sprint competition in roller sports at the 2023 Pan American Games was held on November 4 at the Patinódromo in Santiago.

== Schedule ==
All times are Chilean Summer Time (UTC-3).

Date	Time	Round
November 4, 2023	17:00	Qualification
November 4, 2023	17:40	Final

== Results ==
Qualification

The results were as below.

Rank	Name	Nation	Time	Notes
1	Fabriana Arias	Colombia	1:28.619	Q
2	Gabriela Rueda	Colombia	1:29.488	Q
3	Valentina Letelier	Mexico	1:28.724	q
4	Ivonne Nóchez	El Salvador	1:29.029	q
5	Rocío Alt	Argentina	1:29.097	q
6	Angélica García	Independent Athletes Team	1:29.385	q
7	Angy Quintero	Venezuela	1:29.608	q
8	Gabriela Vargas	Ecuador	1:29.637	q
9	Javiera Pendavis	Chile	1:31.407	
10	Darian O'Neil	United States	1:35.506	
11	Rocío Valdés	Cuba	1:36.707	
12	Sofia Scheibler	Brazil	1:37.173	

Final

The results were as below.

Rank	Name	Nation	Time
1st place, gold medalist(s)	Gabriela Rueda	Colombia	1:28.381
2nd place, silver medalist(s)	Gabriela Vargas	Ecuador	1:28.741
3rd place, bronze medalist(s)	Angy Quintero	Venezuela	1:28.794
4	Valentina Letelier	Mexico	1:29.220
5	Rocío Alt	Argentina	1:29.889
6	Fabriana Arias	Colombia	1:30.064
7	Angélica García	Independent Athletes Team	1:30.064
8	Ivonne Nóchez	El Salvador	1:30.195
