= Roller sports at the 2023 Pan American Games – Women's 10,000 metres elimination =

Women's 10,000 metres elimination race in roller sports at the 2023 Pan American Games
- Venue: Patinódromo
- Dates: November 5
- Competitors: 11 from 10 nations

Medalists
Gold medal	Fabriana Arias	Colombia
Silver medal	Gabriela Rueda	Colombia
Bronze medal	Gabriela Vargas	Ecuador

The women's speed skating 10,000 metres elimination race in roller sports at the 2023 Pan American Games was held on November 5 at the Patinódromo in Santiago.

== Schedule ==
All times are Chilean Summer Time (UTC-3).

Date	Time	Round
November 5, 2023	9:40	Final

== Results ==
11 athletes from 10 countries competed.

Rank	Name	Nation	Points
1st place, gold medalist(s)	Fabriana Arias	Colombia	17:46.877
2nd place, silver medalist(s)	Gabriela Rueda	Colombia	17:47.448
3rd place, bronze medalist(s)	Gabriela Vargas	Ecuador	17:47.638
4	Angy Quintero	Venezuela	EL
5	Valentina Letelier	Mexico	EL
6	Javiera Pendavis	Chile	EL
7	Angélica García	Independent Athletes Team	EL
8	Rocío Alt	Argentina	EL
9	Darian O'Neil	United States	EL
10	Rocío Valdés	Cuba	EL
11	Sofia Scheibler	Brazil	EL
