= Roller sports at the 2023 Pan American Games – Men's 1,000 metres sprint =

Men's 1,000 metres sprint in roller sports at the 2023 Pan American Games
- Venue: Patinódromo
- Dates: November 4
- Competitors: 13 from 12 nations

Medalists
Gold medal	Juan Mantilla	Colombia
Silver medal	Andrés Jiménez	Colombia
Bronze medal	Hugo Ramírez	Chile

The men's speed skating 1,000 metres sprint competition in roller sports at the 2023 Pan American Games was held on November 4 at the Patinódromo in Santiago.

== Schedule ==
All times are Chilean Summer Time (UTC-3).

Date	Time	Round
November 4, 2023	17:20	Qualification
November 4, 2023	18:00	Final

== Results ==
Qualification

The results were as below.

Rank	Name	Nation	Time	Notes
1	Andrés Jiménez	Colombia	1:23.987	Q
2	Juan Mantilla	Colombia	1:24.073	Q
3	Ken Kuwada	Argentina	1:24.177	q
4	José Carlos Rangel	Venezuela	1:24.282	q
5	Hugo Ramírez	Chile	1:24.391	q
6	Jorge Martínez	Mexico	1:24.536	q
7	Guilherme Rocha	Brazil	1:24.635	q
8	Matthew Fortner	United States	1:25.163	q
9	Sebastián Castillo	Costa Rica	1:25.164	
10	Renato Carchi	Ecuador	1:25.540	
11	Dayan Núñez	Cuba	1:28.064	
	Julio Mirena	Paraguay	DSQ	
	Marvin Gómez	El Salvador	DNS	

Final

The results were as below.

Rank	Name	Nation	Time
1st place, gold medalist(s)	Juan Mantilla	Colombia	1:23.931
2nd place, silver medalist(s)	Andrés Jiménez	Colombia	1:24.151
3rd place, bronze medalist(s)	Hugo Ramírez	Chile	1:24.252
4	Ken Kuwada	Argentina	1:24.780
5	Matthew Fortner	United States	1:24.856
6	Jorge Martínez	Mexico	1:24.891
7	José Carlos Rangel	Venezuela	1:26.478
8	Guilherme Rocha	Brazil	1:27.730
