= Roller sports at the 2023 Pan American Games – Women's 200 metres time-trial =

Women's 200 metres time trial in roller sports at the 2023 Pan American Games
- Venue: Patinódromo
- Dates: November 4
- Competitors: 12 from 11 nations

Medalists
Gold medal	Geiny Pájaro	Colombia
Silver medal	Ivonne Nóchez	El Salvador
Bronze medal	Erin Jackson	United States

The women's speed skating 200 metres time trial in roller sports at the 2023 Pan American Games was held on November 4 at the Patinódromo in Santiago.

== Schedule ==
All times are Chilean Summer Time (UTC-3).

Date	Time	Round
November 4, 2023	9:00	Final

== Results ==
12 athletes from 11 countries competed.

Rank	Name	Nation	Time
1st place, gold medalist(s)	Geiny Pájaro	Colombia	18.624
2nd place, silver medalist(s)	Ivonne Nóchez	El Salvador	18.873
3rd place, bronze medalist(s)	Erin Jackson	United States	18.909
4	María Arias	Ecuador	18.957
5	Dalia Marenco	Independent Athletes Team	19.105
6	Valeria Rodríguez	Colombia	19.298
7	Mariela Zubieta	Mexico	19.527
8	Romina Morales	Chile	19.534
9	Aylen Tuya	Argentina	19.572
10	Wilmary Davila	Venezuela	19.675
11	Adriana Tundidor	Cuba	20.927
12	Sofia Scheibler	Brazil	20.927
