= Roller sports at the 2023 Pan American Games – Men's 10,000 metres elimination =

Men's 10,000 metres elimination race in roller sports at the 2023 Pan American Games
- Venue: Patinódromo
- Dates: November 5
- Competitors: 11 from 10 nations

Medalists
Gold medal	Andrés Gómez	Colombia
Silver medal	Juan Mantilla	Colombia
Bronze medal	Hugo Ramírez	Chile

The men's speed skating 10,000 metres elimination race in roller sports at the 2023 Pan American Games was held on November 5 at the Patinódromo in Santiago.

== Schedule ==
All times are Chilean Summer Time (UTC-3).

Date	Time	Round
November 5, 2023	10:40	Final

== Results ==
11 athletes from 10 countries competed.

Rank	Name	Nation	Points
1st place, gold medalist(s)	Andrés Gómez	Colombia	15:14.489
2nd place, silver medalist(s)	Juan Mantilla	Colombia	15:14.515
3rd place, bronze medalist(s)	Hugo Ramírez	Chile	15:22.287
4	Jorge Bolaños	Ecuador	EL
5	Julio Mirena	Paraguay	EL
6	Dayan Núñez	Cuba	EL
7	Matthew Fortner	United States	EL
8	Ken Kuwada	Argentina	EL
9	Gustavo Rodríguez	Venezuela	EL
10	Sebastián Castillo	Costa Rica	EL
11	Carlos Monsivais	Mexico	EL
