= Roller sports at the 2023 Pan American Games – Women's 500 metres + distance =

Women's 500 metres + distance in roller sports at the 2023 Pan American Games
- Venue: Patinódromo
- Dates: November 5
- Competitors: 12 from 11 nations

Medalists
Gold medal	Erin Jackson	United States
Silver medal	María Arias	Ecuador
Bronze medal	Geiny Pájaro	Colombia

The women's speed skating 500 metres + distance competition in roller sports at the 2023 Pan American Games was held on November 5 at the Patinódromo in Santiago.

== Schedule ==
All times are Chilean Summer Time (UTC-3).

Date	Time	Round
November 5, 2023	9:00	Qualification
November 5, 2023	10:10	Semifinal
November 5, 2023	11:15	Final

== Results ==
Qualification

The results were as below.

Rank	Name	Nation	Time	Notes
1	María Arias	Ecuador	45.761	Q
2	Valeria Rodríguez	Colombia	45.904	Q
3	Ivonne Nóchez	El Salvador	45.912	Q
4	Wilmary Davila	Venezuela	46.031	Q
5	Romina Morales	Chile	46.326	Q
6	Erin Jackson	United States	46.643	Q
7	Geiny Pájaro	Colombia	46.704	Q
8	Mariela Zubieta	Mexico	46.949	Q
9	Aylen Tuya	Argentina	47.156	
10	Adriana Tundidor	Cuba	47.172	
11	Dalia Marenco	Independent Athletes Team	47.176	

Semifinal

The results were as below.

Semifinal 1

Rank	Name	Nation	Time	Notes
1	Geiny Pájaro	Colombia	45.778	Q
2	Erin Jackson	United States	45.838	Q
3	Valeria Rodríguez	Colombia	46.005	q
4	Ivonne Nóchez	El Salvador	46.260	q

Semifinal 2

Rank	Name	Nation	Time	Notes
1	María Arias	Ecuador	46.676	Q
2	Wilmary Davila	Venezuela	46.720	Q
3	Romina Morales	Chile	46.894	q
4	Mariela Zubieta	Mexico	47.128	q

Final B

The results were as below.

Rank	Name	Nation	Time
1	Ivonne Nóchez	El Salvador	46.385
2	Valeria Rodríguez	Colombia	46.399
3	Romina Morales	Chile	46.481
4	Mariela Zubieta	Mexico	46.772

Final A

The results were as below.

Rank	Name	Nation	Time
1st place, gold medalist(s)	Erin Jackson	United States	45.518
2nd place, silver medalist(s)	María Arias	Ecuador	45.632
3rd place, bronze medalist(s)	Geiny Pájaro	Colombia	45.723
	Wilmary Davila	Venezuela	DSQ
