= Roller sports at the 2023 Pan American Games – Men's 500 metres + distance =

Men's 500 metres + distance in roller sports at the 2023 Pan American Games
- Venue: Patinódromo
- Dates: November 5
- Competitors: 10 from 10 nations

Medalists
Gold medal	Andrés Jiménez	Colombia
Silver medal	Carlos Monsivais	Mexico
Bronze medal	Emanuelle Silva	Chile

The men's speed skating 500 metres + distance competition in roller sports at the 2023 Pan American Games was held on November 5 at the Patinódromo in Santiago.

== Schedule ==
All times are Chilean Summer Time (UTC-3).

Date	Time	Round
November 5, 2023	9:20	Qualification
November 5, 2023	10:20	Semifinal
November 5, 2023	11:30	Final

== Results ==
Qualification

The results were as below.

Rank	Name	Nation	Time	Notes
1	Emanuelle Silva	Chile	43.017	Q
2	Andrés Jiménez	Colombia	43.217	Q
3	José Carlos Rangel	Venezuela	43.314	Q
4	Carlos Monsivais	Mexico	43.339	Q
5	Renato Carchi	Ecuador	43.502	Q
6	Guilherme Rocha	Brazil	43.522	Q
7	Nahuel Quevedo	Argentina	43.777	Q
8	José Daniel Moncada	Paraguay	44.019	Q
9	Jacob Anderson	United States	44.117	
10	Marlon Oreamuno	Costa Rica	44.250	

Semifinal

The results were as below.

Semifinal 1

Rank	Name	Nation	Time	Notes
1	Andrés Jiménez	Colombia	43.699	Q
2	Guilherme Rocha	Brazil	43.758	Q
3	José Carlos Rangel	Venezuela	43.861	q
	Nahuel Quevedo	Argentina	DSQ	

Semifinal 2

Rank	Name	Nation	Time	Notes
1	Emanuelle Silva	Chile	44.106	Q
2	Carlos Monsivais	Mexico	44.130	Q
3	Renato Carchi	Ecuador	45.128	q
4	José Daniel Moncada	Paraguay	45.522	q

Final B

The results were as below.

Rank	Name	Nation	Time
1	José Carlos Rangel	Venezuela	44.606
2	José Daniel Moncada	Paraguay	44.980
3	Renato Carchi	Ecuador	45.209

Final A

The results were as below.

Rank	Name	Nation	Time
1st place, gold medalist(s)	Andrés Jiménez	Colombia	43.104
2nd place, silver medalist(s)	Carlos Monsivais	Mexico	44.108
3rd place, bronze medalist(s)	Emanuelle Silva	Chile	1:01.789
	Guilherme Rocha	Brazil	DSQ
