= Gymnastics at the 2023 Pan American Games – Men's floor =

Men's floor exercise at the 2023 Pan American Games
- Venue: Training Center for Collective Sport
- Dates: October 24
- Competitors: 8 from 6 nations
- Winning score: 14.233

Medalists
Gold medal	Félix Dolci	Canada
Silver medal	Arthur Mariano	Brazil
Bronze medal	Juan Larrahondo	Colombia

The men's floor exercise gymnastic event at the 2023 Pan American Games was held on October 24 at the Training Center for Collective Sport. All-around champion Félix Dolci won his second gold medal of the games.

== Results ==
=== Final ===
Rank	Gymnast	D Score	E Score	Pen.	Total
1st place, gold medalist(s)	Félix Dolci (CAN)	5.9	8.333		14.233
2nd place, silver medalist(s)	Arthur Mariano (BRA)	5.6	8.333		13.933
3rd place, bronze medalist(s)	Juan Larrahondo (COL)	5.5	7.866		13.366
4	Santiago Mayol (ARG)	5.7	7.500	0.1	13.100
5	Rodrigo Gómez (MEX)	5.6	7.766	0.3	13.066
6	Donnell Whittenburg (USA)	6.2	6.700	0.2	12.700
7	René Cournoyer (CAN)	5.3	7.133		12.433
8	Yuri Guimarães (BRA)	5.4	6.666	0.1	11.966

=== Qualification ===
Rank	Gymnast	D Score	E Score	Pen.	Total	Qual.
1	(Canada) Félix Dolci	6.000	8.266		14.266	Q
2	(United States) Donnell Whittenburg	6.400	7.833		14.233	Q
3	(Brazil) Yuri Guimarães	5.700	8.500	-0.10	14.100	Q
4	(Brazil) Arthur Mariano	5.300	8.766		14.066	Q
5	(Argentina) Santiago Mayol	5.700	8.300		14.000	Q
6	(Mexico) Rodrigo Gómez	5.400	8.500		13.900	Q
7	(Colombia) Juan Larrahondo	5.500	8.300		13.800	Q
8	(Canada) René Cournoyer	5.300	8.433		13.733	Q
9	(Brazil) Diogo Soares	5.400	8.500	-0.3	13.600	–
10	(Chile) Luciano Letelier	5.700	7.900		13.600	R1
11	(United States) Colt Walker	5.200	8.433	-0.1	13.533	R2
12	(Mexico) Alonso Pérez	5.400	8.233	-0.10	13.533	R3
