= Colombia at the 2023 Pan American Games =

- IOC code: COL
- NOC: Colombian Olympic Committee
- Website: www.olimpicocol.co (in Spanish)

in Santiago, Chile 20 October 2023 – 5 November 2023
- Competitors: 390 in 35 sports
- Flag bearers (opening): Miguel Trejos & Yeni Arias
- Flag bearers (closing): Miguel Ángel Rodríguez & Fabriana Arias
- Medals Ranked 6th: Gold 29 Silver 38 Bronze 34 Total 101

Pan American Games appearances (overview)
- 1951; 1955; 1959; 1963; 1967; 1971; 1975; 1979; 1983; 1987; 1991; 1995; 1999; 2003; 2007; 2011; 2015; 2019; 2023; 2027

Colombia competed at the 2023 Pan American Games in Santiago, Chile from October 20 to November 5, 2023. This was Colombia's 19th appearance at the Pan American Games, having competed at every Games since the inaugural edition in 1951.

Taekwondo athlete Miguel Trejos and boxer Yeni Arias were the country's flagbearers during the opening ceremony. Meanwhile, squash athlete Miguel Ángel Rodríguez and roller speed skater Fabriana Arias were the country's flagbearers during the closing ceremony.

As Barranquilla was supposed to be host the 2027 Pan American Games, a Colombian segment was performed at the closing ceremony. However, in January 2024, Barranquilla were stripped from hosting rights. Lima in Peru, who hosted the 2019 Pan American Games, would replace Barranquilla.

== Medalists ==
The following Colombian competitors won medals at the games. In the by discipline sections below, medalists' names are bolded.

Medal	Name	Sport	Event	Date
Gold	Walter Vargas	Cycling	Men's road time trial	October 22
Gold	Mariana Pajón	Cycling	Women's BMX racing	October 22
Gold	Yenny Álvarez	Weightlifting	Women's 59 kg	October 22
Gold	Jhonatan Rivas	Weightlifting	Men's 102 kg	October 23
Gold	Rafael Cerro	Weightlifting	Men's +102 kg	October 24
Gold	Martha Bayona	Cycling	Women's track keirin	October 25
Gold	Yeni Arias	Boxing	Women's 54 kg	October 27
Gold	Kevin Quintero	Cycling	Men's track keirin	October 27
Gold	Lina Hernández; Lina Rojas	Cycling	Women's track madison	October 27
Gold	Martha Bayona	Cycling	Women's track sprint	October 27
Gold	Colombia national baseball team: Francisco Acuña; Carlos Arroyo; Randy Consuegra; Carlos Mario Díaz; Leandro Emiliani; Kevin Escorcia; Santiago Florez; Ruben Galindo; Dilson Herrera; Jesús Marriaga; Carlos Martínez; Jorge Martínez; Hernando Mejía; Jaider Morelos; Luis Moreno; Jhon Peluffo; Fabián Pertuz; Derwin Pomare; Jorge Puerta; José Ramos; Jean Ruiz; Víctor Vargas; Julio Vivas; Ezequiel Zabaleta	Baseball	Men's tournament	October 28
Gold	Nicolás Barrientos; Yuliana Lizarazo	Tennis	Mixed doubles	October 28
Gold	Natalia Linares	Athletics	Women's long jump	October 30
Gold	Izzi Gómez	Surfing	Women's SUP surf	October 30
Gold	Arnovis Dalmero	Athletics	Men's long jump	October 31
Gold	Flor Ruiz	Athletics	Women's javelin throw	November 3
Gold	Ronald Palomino; Juan Camilo Vargas	Squash	Men's doubles	November 3
Gold	Lucía Bautista; Laura Tovar	Squash	Women's doubles	November 3
Gold	Sara López; Jagdeep Singh	Archery	Mixed team compound	November 4
Gold	Ángel Hernández	Gymnastics	Men's individual trampoline	November 4
Gold	Juan Mantilla	Roller sports	Men's 1,000 metres sprint	November 4
Gold	Geiny Pájaro	Roller sports	Women's 200 metres time-trial	November 4
Gold	Gabriela Rueda	Roller sports	Women's 1,000 metres sprint	November 4
Gold	Sandra García	Roller sports	Women's free skating	November 4
Gold	Clara Guerrero	Bowling	Women's singles	November 5
Gold	Andrés Jiménez	Roller sports	Men's 500 metres + distance	November 5
Gold	Andrés Gómez	Roller sports	Men's 10,000 metres elimination	November 5
Gold	Fabriana Arias	Roller sports	Women's 10,000 metres elimination	November 5
Gold	Ronald Palomino; Miguel Ángel Rodríguez; Juan Camilo Vargas	Squash	Men's team	November 5
Silver	Andrea Ramírez	Taekwondo	Women's 49 kg	October 21
Silver	Luis Javier Mosquera	Weightlifting	Men's 73 kg	October 21
Silver	Miguel Trejos	Taekwondo	Men's 80 kg	October 22
Silver	Yeison López	Weightlifting	Men's 89 kg	October 22
Silver	Mari Sánchez	Weightlifting	Women's 71 kg	October 22
Silver	Colombia women's national 3x3 team: Wendy Coy; Carolina Lopéz; Valentina Lopéz; Jenifer Muñoz	Basketball	Women's 3x3 tournament	October 23
Silver	Luis Uribe	Diving	Men's 3 m springboard	October 23
Silver	Gloria Mosquera	Taekwondo	Women's +67 kg	October 23
Silver	Carlos Echeverri; Rubén Murillo; Kevin Quintero	Cycling	Men's track team sprint	October 24
Silver	Daniel Restrepo; Luis Uribe	Diving	Men's synchronized 3 m springboard	October 24
Silver	Lina Hernández	Cycling	Women's track omnium	October 26
Silver	Valeria Arboleda	Boxing	Women's 57 kg	October 27
Silver	Angie Valdés	Boxing	Women's 60 kg	October 27
Silver	Juan Arango; Jordan Parra	Cycling	Men's track madison	October 27
Silver	Juan Arango; Jordan Parra; Brayan Sánchez; Nelson Soto	Cycling	Men's track team pursuit	October 27
Silver	Johan Rojas	Judo	Men's 60 kg	October 28
Silver	María Herazo González; María Paulina Pérez	Tennis	Women's doubles	October 28
Silver	Colombia women's national basketball team: Yanet Arias; Mayra Caicedo; María Delgado; Carolina López; Mabel Martínez; Jenifer Muñoz; Manuela Rios; Isabel Rodríguez; Yuliany Paz; Tania Valencia; Meredith Venner; Marlyn Vente	Basketball	Women's tournament	October 29
Silver	Mauricio Ortega	Athletics	Men's discus throw	October 30
Silver	Brigitte Carabalí	Judo	Women's +78 kg	October 30
Silver	Miguel Ángel Rodríguez	Squash	Men's singles	November 1
Silver	Óscar Tigreros	Wrestling	Men's freestyle 57 kg	November 1
Silver	Juliana Franco; Clara Guerrero	Bowling	Women's doubles	November 2
Silver	Carolina Velásquez	Triathlon	Women's	November 2
Silver	Valentina Zapata	Karate	Women's kata	November 3
Silver	Tatiana Rentería	Wrestling	Women's freestyle 76 kg	November 3
Silver	Sara López; Alejandra Usquiano	Archery	Women's team compound	November 4
Silver	Jennifer Rodríguez	Athletics	Women's high jump	November 4
Silver	Luisa Tejada	Breaking	B-girls	November 4
Silver	Rubén Henao	Karate	Men's kumite 84 kg	November 4
Silver	Andrés Jiménez	Roller sports	Men's 1,000 metres sprint	November 4
Silver	Julián Horta	Wrestling	Men's Greco–Roman 67 kg	November 4
Silver	Juliana Franco	Bowling	Women's singles	November 5
Silver	Sebastián Muñoz	Golf	Men's Individual	November 5
Silver	Mariajo Uribe	Golf	Women's individual	November 5
Silver	Wendy Mosquera	Karate	Women's kumite 68 kg	November 5
Silver	Juan Mantilla	Roller sports	Men's 10,000 metres elimination	November 5
Silver	Gabriela Rueda	Roller sports	Women's 10,000 metres elimination	November 5
Bronze	Luis Uribe	Diving	Men's 1 m springboard	October 21
Bronze	Jhancarlos González	Roller sports	Men's street	October 21
Bronze	Jhon Garrido	Taekwondo	Men's 58 kg	October 21
Bronze	Carlos Ramírez	Cycling	Men's BMX racing	October 22
Bronze	Gabriela Bolle	Cycling	Women's BMX racing	October 22
Bronze	Alejandro Solarte; Sebastián Villa	Diving	Men's synchronized 10 m platform	October 22
Bronze	Juan Larrahondo	Gymnastics	Men's floor	October 24
Bronze	Andrea Alzate; Lina Hernández; Juliana Londoño; Lina Rojas	Cycling	Women's track team pursuit	October 25
Bronze	Cristian Salcedo	Boxing	Men's +92 kg	October 26
Bronze	Ingrit Valencia	Boxing	Women's 50 kg	October 26
Bronze	Camila Camilo	Boxing	Women's 66 kg	October 26
Bronze	Kevin Quintero	Cycling	Men's track sprint	October 26
Bronze	María Villalba	Judo	Women's 57 kg	October 28
Bronze	Francisco Balanta	Judo	Men's 100 kg	October 30
Bronze	Francisco Balanta; Luisa Bonilla; Brigitte Carabalí; Daniel Paz; Andrés Sandoval; María Villalba	Judo	Mixed team	October 31
Bronze	Evelis Aguilar	Athletics	Women's 400 metres	November 1
Bronze	Catalina Peláez; Miguel Ángel Rodríguez	Squash	Mixed doubles	November 2
Bronze	Nicoll Parrado	Wrestling	Women's freestyle 68 kg	November 2
Bronze	Juan Fernández	Karate	Men's kumite 60 kg	November 3
Bronze	Katherine Rentería	Wrestling	Women's freestyle 62 kg	November 3
Bronze	Jagdeep Singh	Archery	Men's individual compound	November 4
Bronze	Sebastián Arenas; Jagdeep Singh	Archery	Men's team compound	November 4
Bronze	Alejandra Usquiano	Archery	Women's individual compound	November 4
Bronze	Carolina Posada; Ana Rendón; Maira Sepúlveda	Archery	Women's team recurve	November 4
Bronze	Carlos San Martín	Athletics	Men's 3000 metres steeplechase	November 4
Bronze	Manuela Gómez; Madison Velásquez	Canoeing	Women's C-2 500 metres	November 4
Bronze	Geraldine Peña	Karate	Women's kumite 55 kg	November 4
Bronze	Andrés Jiménez	Roller sports	Men's 200 metres time-trial	November 4
Bronze	Deivi Rojas	Roller sports	Men's free skating	November 4
Bronze	Lucía Bautista; Catalina Peláez; Laura Tovar	Squash	Women's team	November 4
Bronze	Colombia men's national volleyball team: Juan Camilo Ambuila; Daniel Aponza; Jharold Caicedo; Jhon Cuello; Juan Estupiñan; Gustavo Larrahondo; Leandro Mejía; Jorge Mesa; Andrés Piza; Rossvuelt Ríos; Santiago Ruiz	Volleyball	Men's tournament	November 4
Bronze	Carlos Muñoz	Wrestling	Men's Greco–Roman 87 kg	November 4
Bronze	Juan Landázuri	Karate	Men's kumite 75 kg	November 5
Bronze	Geiny Pájaro	Roller sports	Women's 500 metres + distance	November 5

Medals by sport
Sport	1st place, gold medalist(s)	2nd place, silver medalist(s)	3rd place, bronze medalist(s)	Total
Roller sports	7	3	4	**14**
Cycling	6	4	4	**14**
Weightlifting	3	3	0	**6**
Athletics	3	2	2	**7**
Squash	3	1	2	**6**
Boxing	1	2	3	**6**
Bowling	1	2	0	**3**
Archery	1	1	4	**6**
Tennis	1	1	0	**2**
Gymnastics	1	0	1	**2**
Baseball	1	0	0	**1**
Surfing	1	0	0	**1**
Karate	0	3	3	**6**
Wrestling	0	3	3	**6**
Taekwondo	0	3	1	**4**
Judo	0	2	3	**5**
Diving	0	2	2	**4**
Basketball	0	2	0	**2**
Golf	0	2	0	**2**
Breaking	0	1	0	**1**
Triathlon	0	1	0	**1**
Canoeing	0	0	1	**1**
Volleyball	0	0	1	**1**
Total	29	38	34	101

Medals by day
Day	Date	1st place, gold medalist(s)	2nd place, silver medalist(s)	3rd place, bronze medalist(s)	Total
1	October 21	0	2	3	5
2	October 22	3	3	3	9
3	October 23	1	3	0	4
4	October 24	1	2	1	4
5	October 25	1	0	1	2
6	October 26	0	1	4	5
7	October 27	4	4	0	8
8	October 28	2	2	1	5
9	October 29	0	1	0	1
10	October 30	2	2	1	5
11	October 31	1	0	1	2
12	November 1	0	2	1	3
13	November 2	0	2	2	4
14	November 3	3	2	2	7
15	November 4	6	6	12	24
16	November 5	5	6	2	13
Total		29	38	34	101

Medals by gender
Gender	1st place, gold medalist(s)	2nd place, silver medalist(s)	3rd place, bronze medalist(s)	Total
Male	12	17	18	**47**
Female	15	21	14	**50**
Mixed	2	0	2	**4**
Total	29	38	34	101

== Competitors ==
The following is the list of number of competitors (per gender) participating at the games per sport/discipline.

Sport	Men	Women	Total
Archery	5	5	10
Artistic swimming	1	8	9
Athletics	13	12	25
Badminton	1	1	2
Baseball	24	0	24
Basketball	0	16	16
Bowling	2	2	4
Boxing	7	6	13
Breaking	2	1	3
Canoeing	3	5	8
Cycling	18	17	35
Diving	4	4	8
Equestrian	8	4	12
Fencing	9	9	18
Football	18	0	18
Golf	2	2	4
Gymnastics	7	13	20
Judo	5	5	10
Karate	5	5	10
Roller sports	6	8	14
Rowing	0	1	1
Rugby sevens	0	12	12
Sailing	2	2	4
Shooting	4	1	5
Squash	3	3	6
Surfing	0	1	1
Swimming	9	9	18
Table tennis	2	3	5
Taekwondo	4	3	7
Tennis	3	3	6
Triathlon	2	2	4
Volleyball	14	14	28
Water skiing	3	3	6
Weightlifting	8	5	13
Wrestling	8	3	11
Total	202	188	390

== Archery ==
Colombia qualified 10 archers during the 2022 Pan American Archery Championships.

Men

Athlete	Event	Ranking Round		Round of 32	Round of 16	Quarterfinals	Semifinals	Final / BM	Rank
Athlete	Event	Score	Seed	Opposition Score	Opposition Score	Opposition Score	Opposition Score	Opposition Score	Rank
Santiago Arcila	Individual recurve	672	8	Urbina (MEX); W 7–3	Mirich (USA); L 0–6	Did not advance			15
Daniel Betancur	Individual recurve	660	14	Gomes (BRA); W 7–3	Grande (MEX); L 1–7	Did not advance			13
Jorge Enríquez	Individual recurve	681	4	Permaul (GUY); W 6–0	Soto (CHI); L 3–7	Did not advance			11
Sebastián Arenas	Individual compound	703	7	—N/a	Fagan (CAN); W 145–143	Singh (COL); L 145–147	Did not advance		6
Jagdeep Singh	Individual compound	709	2	—N/a	Salazar (EAI); W 149–144	Arenas (COL); W 147–145	Sullivan (USA); L 144–144	bronze medal final Hernández (ESA); W 145–144	3rd place, bronze medalist(s)
Santiago Arcila; Daniel Betancur; Jorge Enríquez	Team recurve	2013	2	—N/a		Chile; W 5–3	Mexico; L 3–5	bronze medal final Brazil; L 3–5	4
Sebastián Arenas; Jagdeep Singh	Team compound	1412	2	—N/a		Bye	El Salvador; L 155–158	bronze medal final Mexico; W 156–156	3rd place, bronze medalist(s)

Women

Athlete	Event	Ranking Round		Round of 32	Round of 16	Quarterfinals	Semifinals	Final / BM	Rank
Athlete	Event	Score	Seed	Opposition Score	Opposition Score	Opposition Score	Opposition Score	Opposition Score	Rank
Carolina Posada	Individual recurve	616	16	Arango (VEN); W 6–4	Valencia (MEX); L 0–6	Did not advance			=9
Ana Rendón	Individual recurve	653	5	Zavala (PER); W 6–0	Vásquez (MEX); W 6–2	GNoriega (USA); W 6–2	Valencia (MEX); L 1–7	bronze medal final Kaufhold (USA); L 0–6	4
Maira Sepúlveda	Individual recurve	637	9	Ortíz (DOM); W 6–0	Mucino-Fernandez (USA); L 0–6	Did not advance			=9
Sara López	Individual compound	710	1 PR	—N/a	Zúñiga (CHI); W 147–142	Colorado (ESA); W 148–141	Quintero (MEX); L 146–149	bronze medal final Usquiano (COL); L 142–143	4
Alejandra Usquiano	Individual compound	701	3	—N/a	Rodrigo (ECU); W 143–138	Becerra (MEX); W 146–144	Ruiz (USA); L 144–145	bronze medal final López (COL); W 143–142	3rd place, bronze medalist(s)
Carolina Posada; Ana Rendón; Maira Sepúlveda	Team recurve	1906	3	—N/a		Chile; W 6–2	United States; L 2–6	bronze medal final Brazil; W 5–4	3rd place, bronze medalist(s)
Sara López; Alejandra Usquiano	Team compound	1411	1	—N/a		Bye	El Salvador; W 155–151	United States; L 153–160	2nd place, silver medalist(s)

Mixed

Athlete	Event	Ranking Round		Round of 32	Round of 16	Quarterfinals	Semifinals	Final / BM	Rank
Athlete	Event	Score	Seed	Opposition Score	Opposition Score	Opposition Score	Opposition Score	Opposition Score	Rank
Jorge Enríquez; Ana Rendón	Team recurve	1334	4	—N/a	Ecuador; W 6–2	Canada; W 6–2	United States; L 3–5	bronze medal final Mexico; L 3–5	4
Sara López; Jagdeep Singh	Team compound	1419	2	—N/a		Independent Athletes Team; W 154–150	Mexico; W 156–155	United States; W 156–150	1st place, gold medalist(s)

== Artistic swimming ==
Colombia qualified a full team of nine artistic swimmers after winning silver medals in the 2022 South American Games.

Athlete	Event	Technical Routine		Free Routine		Acrobatic Routine		Total	
Athlete	Event	Points	Rank	Points	Rank	Points	Rank	Points	Rank
Estefanía Roa; Melisa Ceballos	Duet	212.2917	3	160.2125	5	—N/a		372.5042	4
Estefanía Roa; Gustavo Sánchez; Isabella Franco; Jennifer Cerquera; Kerly Barrera; Melisa Ceballos; Mónica Arango; Sara Castañeda; Sara Rodríguez	Team	204.1163	5	191.7229	5	179.1933	6	575.0325	6

== Athletics ==
Colombia has qualified 25 athletes (13 men and 12 women) for the games.

Key

- Note–Ranks given for track events are within the athlete's heat only
- Q = Qualified for the next round
- q = Qualified for the next round as a fastest loser
- Bye = Athlete not required to compete in round

Men
Track & road events

Athlete	Event	Semifinal		Final	
Athlete	Event	Time	Rank	Time	Rank
Ronal Longa	100 m	DQ		Did not advance	
Carlos Palacios	200 m	21.11	6 Q	DNS	
Anthony Zambrano	400 m	46.01	3 Q	DQ	
Jhon Perlaza	400 m	47.06	7 q	47.32	5
Iván Darío González	10,000 m	—N/a		30:13.81	10
Carlos San Martín	3000 m steeplechase	—N/a		8:41.59	3rd place, bronze medalist(s)
Arnovis Dalmero; Carlos Flórez; Ronal Longa; Carlos Palacios; Jhonny Rentería	4 × 100 m relay	DNS		Did not advance	
José Leonardo Montaña	20 km walk	—N/a		1:26:12	10

Field events

Athlete	Event	Final	
Athlete	Event	Distance	Rank
Arnovis Dalmero	Long jump	8.08	1st place, gold medalist(s)
José Tomás Nieto	Pole vault	5.30	6
Mauricio Ortega	Discus throw	61.86	2nd place, silver medalist(s)
Billy Julio	Javelin throw	73.35	6

Women
Track & road events

Athlete	Event	Semifinal		Final	
Athlete	Event	Time	Rank	Time	Rank
Laura Martínez	100 m	11.70	10	Did not advance	
Lina Licona	200 m	DQ		Did not advance	
Evelis Aguilar	400 m	53.11	6 Q	51.95	3rd place, bronze medalist(s)
Valeria Cabezas	400 m hurdles	DNS		Did not advance	
Lina Licona; Natalia Linares; Laura Martínez; Shary Vallecilla	4 × 100 m relay	44.67	4 Q	44.79	6

Field events

Athlete	Event	Final	
Athlete	Event	Distance	Rank
Jennifer Rodríguez	High jump	1.84	2nd place, silver medalist(s)
Natalia Linares	Long jump	6.66	1st place, gold medalist(s)
Katherine Castillo	Pole vault	4.20	6
Mayra Gaviria	Hammer throw	64.42	4
María Lucelly Murillo	Javelin throw	59.19	4
Flor Ruiz	Javelin throw	63.10	1st place, gold medalist(s)

Mixed

Athlete	Event	Final	
Athlete	Event	Result	Rank
Jhon Perlaza; Anthony Zambrano; Evelis Aguilar; Lina Licona	4 × 400 m relay	3:23.17	6
José Leonardo Montaña; Sandra Arenas	Marathon walk	3:16:21	5

== Badminton ==
Colombia qualified a team of two athletes (one man and one woman).

Men

Athlete	Event	First round	Second round	Quarterfinals	Semifinals	Final	Rank
Athlete	Event	Opposition Result	Opposition Result	Opposition Result	Opposition Result	Opposition Result	Rank
Miguel Quirama	Singles	Mariñez (DOM); W 2–0 (21–16, 21–15)	Canjura (ESA); L 0–2 (10–21, 7–21)	Did not advance			=9

Women

Athlete	Event	First round	Second round	Quarterfinals	Semifinals	Final	Rank
Athlete	Event	Opposition Result	Opposition Result	Opposition Result	Opposition Result	Opposition Result	Rank
Laura Londoño	Singles	Bye	Castillo (PER); L 0–2 (8–21, 8–21)	Did not advance			=17

Mixed

Athlete	Event	First round	Second round	Quarterfinals	Semifinals	Final	Rank
Athlete	Event	Opposition Result	Opposition Result	Opposition Result	Opposition Result	Opposition Result	Rank
Miguel Quirama; Laura Londoño	Mixed doubles	Garrido (MEX); Fregoso (MEX); L 0-2 (18–21, 8–21)	Did not advance				=17

== Baseball ==
Summary

Team	Event	Preliminary round				Super Round			Final / BM / Pl.	
Team	Event	Opposition Result	Opposition Result	Opposition Result	Rank	Opposition Result	Opposition Result	Rank	Opposition Result	Rank
Colombia men	Men's tournament	Cuba; L 4-3	Brazil; L 7-8	Venezuela; W 6-2	2 Q	Mexico; W 10-2	Panama; W 2-1	2 Q	Brazil; W 9-1	1st place, gold medalist(s)

Colombia qualified a men's team (of 24 athletes) by winning the 2021 Junior Pan American Games.

Opening round

Group B

Pos	Team	Pld	W	L	RF	RA	PCT	GB	Qualification
1	Brazil	3	3	0	15	10	1.000	—	Super Round
2	Colombia	3	1	2	16	14	.333	2	Super Round
3	Cuba	3	1	2	11	13	.333	2	Fifth place game
4	Venezuela	3	1	2	9	14	.333	2	Seventh place game

Source: Santiago 2023 and WBSC Americas

October 20; 9:30	Colombia	3–4	Cuba	Parque Bicentenario de Cerrillos, Cerrillos
October 20; 9:30		Boxscore		Parque Bicentenario de Cerrillos, Cerrillos

October 22; 9:30	Brazil	8–7 (F/9)	Colombia	Parque Bicentenario de Cerrillos, Cerrillos
October 22; 9:30		Boxscore		Parque Bicentenario de Cerrillos, Cerrillos

October 24; 15:00	Colombia	6–2	Venezuela	Parque Bicentenario de Cerrillos, Cerrillos
October 24; 15:00		Boxscore		Parque Bicentenario de Cerrillos, Cerrillos

Super round

Pos	Team	Pld	W	L	RF	RA	PCT	GB	Qualification
1	Brazil	3	2	1	14	15	.667	—	Gold medal game
2	Colombia	3	2	1	19	11	.667	—	Gold medal game
3	Panama	3	1	2	12	9	.333	1	Bronze medal game
4	Mexico	3	1	2	9	19	.333	1	Bronze medal game

Source: Santiago 2023 and WBSC Americas

October 26; 9:30	Mexico	2–10	Colombia	Parque Bicentenario de Cerrillos, Cerrillos
October 26; 9:30		Boxscore		Parque Bicentenario de Cerrillos, Cerrillos

October 27; 9:30	Colombia	2–1	Panama	Parque Bicentenario de Cerrillos, Cerrillos
October 27; 9:30		Boxscore		Parque Bicentenario de Cerrillos, Cerrillos

Gold medal game

October 28; 15:00	Colombia	9–1	Brazil	Parque Bicentenario de Cerrillos, Cerrillos
October 28; 15:00		Boxscore		Parque Bicentenario de Cerrillos, Cerrillos

October 28, 2023 15:00 at Parque Bicentenario de Cerrillos in Cerrillos, Chile
Team	1	2	3	4	5	6	7	R	H	E
Colombia	1	0	1	3	1	2	1	9	17	1
Brazil	0	1	0	0	0	0	0	1	4	0
WP: Víctor Vargas LP: Felipe Natel; Umpires: HP – Edwin Hernández, 1B – Emmanuel Pérez, 2B – Christian Madero, 3B – Gregori Jiménez; Boxscore

== Basketball ==
=== 5x5 ===
Summary

Team	Event	Group stage				Semifinal	Final / BM / Pl.	
Team	Event	Opposition Result	Opposition Result	Opposition Result	Rank	Opposition Result	Opposition Result	Rank
Colombia women	Women's tournament	Venezuela; W 73–57	Mexico; W 66–54	Brazil; L 57–78	2 Q	Cuba; W 73–48	Brazil; L 40–50	2nd place, silver medalist(s)

==== Women's tournament ====
Colombia qualified a women's team (of 12 athletes) by finishing fifth in the 2023 FIBA Women's AmeriCup.

Preliminary round

Group B

Pos	Team	Pld	W	L	PF	PA	PD	Pts	Qualification
1	Brazil	3	3	0	244	158	+86	6	Semifinals
2	Colombia	3	2	1	196	189	+7	5	Semifinals
3	Venezuela	3	1	2	175	232	−57	4	Fifth place game
4	Mexico	3	0	3	173	209	−36	3	Seventh place game

Source: Santiago 2023

25 October 2023
13:00

Boxscore

Colombia	73–57	Venezuela
Scoring by quarter: 23–15, 12–17, 12–6, 26–19
Pts: Paz 27; Rebs: Paz 8 Asts: Muñoz 4		Pts: Corrales 12; Rebs: Corrales 7 Asts: Durán, Márquez 3

Multisport Complex 1, Santiago
Referees: Leonardo Zalazar (ARG), Carmelo de la Rosa (PUR), Aline García (URU)

26 October 2023
13:00

Boxscore

Mexico	54–66	Colombia
Scoring by quarter: 16–18, 12–12, 16–18, 10–18
Pts: Luna 13; Rebs: Luna 9 Asts: Beltrán 4		Pts: Muñoz 26; Rebs: Paz 8 Asts: Ríos 5

Multisport Complex 1, Santiago
Referees: Andrés Bartel (URU), Carmelo de la Rosa (PUR), Felipe Ibarra (CHI)

27 October 2023
10:30

Boxscore

Brazil	78–57	Colombia
Scoring by quarter: 22–23, 19–8, 11–16, 26–10
Pts: de Souza 14; Rebs: de Souza 8 Asts: dos Santos 8		Pts: Ríos 16; Rebs: Ríos 7 Asts: Muñoz, Ríos 3

Multisport Complex 1, Santiago
Referees: Julio Anaya (PAN), Kristian Páez (ECU), Orlando Varela (HON)

Semifinal

28 October 2023
17:30

Boxscore

Cuba	48–73	Colombia
Scoring by quarter: 16–17, 12–28, 10–12, 10–16
Pts: Despaigne 11; Rebs: Despaigne 12; Asts: Montero 3		Pts: López 15; Rebs: Arias, Vente 6 Asts: Ríos 8

Multisport Complex 1, Santiago
Referees: Daniel García (VEN), Krishna Domínguez (MEX), Felipe Ibarra (CHI)

Gold medal game

29 October 2023
20:00

Boxscore

Colombia	40–50	Brazil
Scoring by quarter: 15–23, 8–9, 6–6, 11–12
Pts: Delgado 15; Rebs: Paz 14; Asts: Ríos 5		Pts: de Souza 13; Rebs: de Souza 12; Asts: dos Santos 4

Multisport Complex 1, Santiago
Referees: Daniel García (VEN), Kelsey Kisilevich (CAN), Orlando Varela (HON)

=== 3x3 ===
Summary

Team	Event	Preliminary round			Quarterfinal	Semifinal	Final / BM / Pl.	
Team	Event	Opposition Result	Opposition Result	Rank	Opposition Result	Opposition Result	Opposition Result	Rank
Colombia women	Women's tournament	El Salvador; W 17–4	Chile; W 21–13	1 Q	Argentina; W 17–9	Puerto Rico; W 21–12	United States; L 14–21	2nd place, silver medalist(s)

==== Women's tournament ====
Colombia qualified a women's team (of 4 athletes) by winning the 2021 Junior Pan American Games.

Preliminary round

Group B

Pos	Team	Pld	W	L	PF	PA	PD	Qualification
1	Colombia	2	2	0	38	17	+21	Quarterfinals
2	Chile (H)	2	1	1	34	25	+9	Quarterfinals
3	El Salvador	2	0	2	8	38	−30	

Source: Report
Rules for classification: 1) Wins; 2) Head-to-head record; 3) Points scored.
(H) Hosts

21 October 2023
14:30

Report

El Salvador	4–17	Colombia
Pts: Rivas 3		Pts: López 5

Estadio Español Las Condes, Santiago
Referees: Nicolás Sarli (URU), Ana Zachi (BRA)

21 October 2023
18:30

Report

Chile	13–21	Colombia
Pts: Ljubetic, Morrison 5		Pts: Muñoz 9

Estadio Español Las Condes, Santiago
Referees: Sonia Maldonado (PUR), Nicolás Sarli (URU)

Quarterfinal

22 October 2023
18:00

Report

Colombia	17–9	Argentina
Pts: Muñoz 7		Pts: Aylen Valdez 4

Estadio Español Las Condes, Santiago
Referees: Ana Zachi (BRA), Marie Houlie (CAN)

Semifinal

23 October 2023
16:30

Report

Colombia	21–12	Puerto Rico
Pts: López 7		Pts: Vargas 6

Estadio Español Las Condes, Santiago
Referees: Marie Houlie (CAN), Ana Zachi (BRA)

Gold medal game

23 October 2023
18:30

Report

United States	21–14	Colombia
Pts: Stevens 11		Pts: Muñoz 6

Estadio Español Las Condes, Santiago
Referees: Felipe Valenzuela (CHI), María Olivieri (ARG)

== Bowling ==
Colombia qualified a full team of two men and two women through the 2022 South American Games held in Asunción, Paraguay.

Athlete	Event	Ranking round		Semifinal	Final	
Athlete	Event	Score	Rank	Opposition Result	Opposition Result	Rank
Felipe Gil	Men's singles	3222	15	Did not advance		
Sebastián Salazar	Men's singles	3327	10	Did not advance		
Felipe Gil; Sebastián Salazar	Men's doubles	3191	8	—N/a		
Juliana Franco	Women's singles	3295	3 Q	Góngora (MEX); W 655–605	Guerrero (COL); L 640–687	2nd place, silver medalist(s)
Clara Guerrero	Women's singles	3484	1 Q	Clemmer (USA); W 678–637	Franco (COL); W 687–640	1st place, gold medalist(s)
Juliana Franco; Clara Guerrero	Women's doubles	3099	2nd place, silver medalist(s)	—N/a		

== Boxing ==
Colombia qualified 13 boxers (seven men and six women).

Men

Athlete	Event	Round of 32	Round of 16	Quarterfinals	Semifinals	Final	Rank
Athlete	Event	Opposition Result	Opposition Result	Opposition Result	Opposition Result	Opposition Result	Rank
Yuberjen Martínez	–51 kg	—N/a	Jokhu (TTO); W RSC	Hill (USA); L 1–4	Did not advance		=5
Yilmar González	–57 kg	—N/a	Tirado (PUR); W 4–1	Horta (CUB); L 2–3	Did not advance		=5
José Viáfara	–63.5 kg	Bouche (HAI); W RSC	Simmons (PAN); W 5–0	Martínez (MEX); L 2–3	Did not advance		=5
Jhonatan Arboleda	–71 kg	—N/a	Fernández (DOM); W 5–0	Beckford (PAN); L RSC	Did not advance		=5
Jhojan Caicedo	–80 kg	—N/a	Bye	López (CUB); L RSC	Did not advance		=5
Marlon Hurtado	–92 kg	—N/a	Guzmán (DOM); W 5–0	Machado (BRA); L 0–5	Did not advance		=5
Cristian Salcedo	+92 kg	—N/a	Paul (TTO); W 5–0	Núñez (PAR); W RSC	Teixeira (BRA); L 1–4	Did not advance	3rd place, bronze medalist(s)

Women

Athlete	Event	Round of 32	Round of 16	Quarterfinals	Semifinals	Final	Rank
Athlete	Event	Opposition Result	Opposition Result	Opposition Result	Opposition Result	Opposition Result	Rank
Ingrit Valencia	–50 kg	—N/a	Bye	López (ARG); W 3–2	De Almeida (BRA); L 1–4	Did not advance	3rd place, bronze medalist(s)
Yeni Arias	–54 kg	—N/a	Pérez (USA); W 4–1	Fernández (MEX); W 4–1	Gómez (VEN); W 5–0	Chagas (BRA); W 3–2	1st place, gold medalist(s)
Valeria Arboleda	–57 kg	—N/a	Hernández (DOM); W 5–0	Maturana (CHI); W 5–0	Lozada (PUR); W 3–2	Romeu (BRA); L 0–5	2nd place, silver medalist(s)
Angie Valdés	–60 kg	—N/a	Guy (TTO); W 5–0	Ríos (VEN); W 3–1	Palacios (ECU); W 4–1	Ferreira (BRA); L 0–5	2nd place, silver medalist(s)
Camila Camilo	–66 kg	—N/a	Bye	Piñeiro (PUR); W 4–1	Dos Santos (BRA); L 2–3	Did not advance	3rd place, bronze medalist(s)
Luisa Vásquez	–75 kg	—N/a	Yriza (VEN); L 0–5	Did not advance			=9

== Breaking ==
Colombia qualified two male and one female breakdancers at the 2023 Pan American Championships.

Athlete	Nickname	Event	Round robin				Quarterfinal	Semifinal	Final / BM	
Athlete	Nickname	Event	Opposition Result	Opposition Result	Opposition Result	Rank	Opposition Result	Opposition Result	Opposition Result	Rank
Jordan Silva	Alvin	B-Boys	Jeffro (USA); L 0–2	Dux-M (DOM); W 2–0	Kastrito (MEX); W 2–0	2 Q	Gravity (USA); L 0–2	Did not advance		7
Ricky Ordóñez	Ricky Rulez	B-Boys	Daf (CHI); W 2–0	Lil G (VEN); W 2–0	Leony (BRA); L 0–2	3	Did not advance			9
Luisa Tejada	Luma	B-Girls	Isis (ECU); W 2–0	Xunli (MEX); W 2–0	Vale Chica (CHI); W 2–0	1 Q	Emma (CAN); W 2–0	La Vix (USA); W 2–1	Sunny (USA); L 0–3	2nd place, silver medalist(s)

== Canoeing ==
=== Sprint ===
Colombia qualified a total of 8 sprint athletes (three men and five women).

Men

Athlete	Event	Heat		Semifinal		Final	
Athlete	Event	Time	Rank	Time	Rank	Time	Rank
Sergio Díaz	C-1 1000 m	4:26.03	5 q	4:03.80	1 Q	4:00.12	6
Daniel Pacheco; Alejandro Rodríguez	C-2 500 m	—N/a				1:44.93	4

Women

Athlete	Event	Heat		Semifinal		Final	
Athlete	Event	Time	Rank	Time	Rank	Time	Rank
Manuela Gómez	C-1 200 m	51.69	5 q	52.92	3 Q	49.28	7
Manuela Gómez; Madison Velásquez	C-2 500 m	—N/a				1:59.10	3rd place, bronze medalist(s)
Mónica Hincapié	K-1 500 m	2:04.14	5 q	2:04.83	3 q	2:04.41	11
Diexe Molina; Tatiana Muñoz	K-2 500 m	1:55.60	4 q	1:50.93	1 q	1:46.25	5

== Cycling ==
Colombia qualified a total of 35 cyclists (18 men and 17 women).

=== BMX ===
Colombia qualified one male cyclist in BMX race after winning the event in the 2021 Junior Pan American Games and four cyclists (two men and two women) in BMX race through the UCI World Rankings.

Freestyle

Athlete	Event	Seeding		Final	
Athlete	Event	Points	Rank	Points	Rank
Luis Rincón	Men's	65.17	8 Q	52.33	6
Queen Saray Villegas	Women's	DNS		Did not advance	

Racing

Athlete	Event	Ranking round		Quarterfinal		Semifinal		Final	
Athlete	Event	Time	Rank	Points	Rank	Points	Rank	Time	Rank
Diego Arboleda	Men's	32.040	2 Q	3	1 Q	6	1 Q	32.800	4
Mateo Carmona	Men's	DNS		Did not advance					
Carlos Ramírez	Men's	32.680	5 Q	4	1 Q	8	3 Q	32.400	3rd place, bronze medalist(s)
Gabriela Bolle	Women's	35.980	4 Q	4	1 Q	7	2 Q	36.500	3rd place, bronze medalist(s)
Mariana Pajón	Women's	35.150	1 Q	3	1 Q	3	1 Q	34.400	1st place, gold medalist(s)

=== Mountain biking ===
Colombia qualified one female cyclist in Mountain biking after winning the event in the 2021 Junior Pan American Games. Colombia also qualified 4 athletes at the 2023 Pan American Championships.

Athlete	Event	Time	Rank
Diego Arias	Men's cross-country	1:20:35	5
Hilvar Malaver	Men's cross-country	1:23:42	10
Gloria Garzón	Women's cross-country	1:31:35	9
Angie Lara	Women's cross-country	LAP	
Ana María Roa	Women's cross-country	1:29:03	6

=== Road ===
Colombia qualified nine road cyclists (four men and five women).

Men

Athlete	Event	Time	Rank
Brayan Sánchez	Road race	3:51:42	33
Harold Tejada	Road race	3:48:37	32
Victor Ocampo	Road race	3:43:22	9
Walter Vargas	Road race	3:48:31	31
Brayan Sánchez	Time trial	50:30.02	14
Victor Ocampo	Time trial	50:01.23	12
Walter Vargas	Time trial	47:02.72	1st place, gold medalist(s)

Women

Athlete	Event	Time	Rank
Andrea Alzate	Road race	2:54:56	17
Diana Peñuela	Road race	2:54:26	14
Lina Hernández	Road race	2:54:58	19
Paula Patiño	Road race	2:53:36	8
Diana Peñuela	Time trial	27:44.92	8
Lina Rojas	Time trial	28:31.15	14
Lina Hernández	Time trial	27:27.72	7

=== Track ===
Colombia qualified a team of 18 track cyclists (nine men and nine women).

Sprint

Athlete	Event	Qualification		Round of 16	Repechage 1	Quarterfinals	Semifinals	Final	
Athlete	Event	Time	Rank	Opposition Time	Opposition Time	Opposition Result	Opposition Result	Opposition Result	Rank
Cristian Ortega	Men's individual	9.836	6 Q	Rorke (CAN); L	Browne (TTO); Da Silva (BRA); W	Paul (TTO); L	Did not advance	5th to 8th final 2nd	6
Fabián Puerta	Men's individual	9.806	4 Q	Verdugo (MEX); W	Bye	Quintero (COL); L	Did not advance	5th to 8th final 1st	5
Kevin Quintero	Men's individual	9.814	5 Q	Vilar (ARG); W	Bye	Puerta (COL); W 10.172 / 10.177	Paul (TTO); L	Bronze medal final Wammes (CAN); W 10.161 / 10.109	3rd place, bronze medalist(s)
Martha Bayona	Women's individual	10.699	1 Q	Molina (CHI); W 11.275	Bye	Orban (CAN); W 11.254 / 11.165	Marquardt (USA); W 11.322 / 11.345	Verdugo (MEX); W 11.088 / 11.154	1st place, gold medalist(s)
Valeria Cardozo	Women's individual	11.262	8 Q	Marquardt (USA); L	Barbosa (BRA); Molina (CHI); L 2nd place	Did not advance			10
Marianis Salazar	Women's individual	11.248	7 Q	Salazar (MEX); L	Orban (CAN); Vera (ARG); L 2nd place	Did not advance			9
Carlos Echeverri; Rubén Murillo; Kevin Quintero	Men's team	43.950	2 QG	—N/a				Canada; L 43.421–43.396	2nd place, silver medalist(s)
Martha Bayona; Valeria Cardozo; Juliana Gaviria; Yarli Mosquera	Women's team	49.670	4 QB	—N/a				Canada; L 48.836–48.498	4

Pursuit

Athlete	Event	Qualification		Semifinals	Finals	
Athlete	Event	Time	Rank	Opposition Result	Opposition Result	Rank
Juan Esteban Arango; Jordan Parra; Brayan Sánchez; Nelson Soto	Men's team	4:00.181	2 Q	United States; W 3:57.990–3:58.586	Canada; L 4:02.310–3:53.593	2nd place, silver medalist(s)
Andrea Alzate; Lina Hernández; Juliana Londoño; Lina Rojas	Women's team	4:32.900	3 Q	Mexico; L 4:27.512–4:24.386	Bronze medal final United States; W 4:24.964–4:27.139	3rd place, bronze medalist(s)

Keirin

Athlete	Event	Heats	Final
Athlete	Event	Rank	Rank
Cristian Ortega	Men's	DQ	Did not advance
Kevin Quintero	Men's	1 FA	1st place, gold medalist(s)
Martha Bayona	Women's	1 FA	1st place, gold medalist(s)
Marianis Salazar	Women's	4 FB	7

Madison

Athlete	Event	Points	Rank
Juan Esteban Arango; Jordan Parra	Men's	46	2nd place, silver medalist(s)
Lina Hernández; Lina Rojas	Women's	46	1st place, gold medalist(s)

Omnium

Athlete	Event	Scratch race		Tempo race		Elimination race		Points race		Total	
Athlete	Event	Points	Rank	Points	Rank	Points	Rank	Points	Rank	Points	Rank
Juan Esteban Arango	Men's	38	2	34	4	32	5	16	4	120	4
Lina Hernández	Women's	30	6	38	2	38	2	15	5	121	2nd place, silver medalist(s)

== Diving ==
Colombia qualified eight divers (four men and four women).

Men

Athlete	Event	Preliminary		Final	
Athlete	Event	Score	Rank	Score	Rank
Daniel Restrepo	1 m Springboard	322.70	11 Q	339.35	8
Luis Uribe	1 m Springboard	339.80	7 Q	371.20	3rd place, bronze medalist(s)
Daniel Restrepo	3 m Springboard	402.40	6 Q	392.20	5
Luis Uribe	3 m Springboard	411.25	4 Q	444.25	2nd place, silver medalist(s)
Alejandro Solarte	10 m platform	357.40	10 Q	398.30	8
Sebastián Villa	10 m platform	403.20	5 Q	406.10	7
Daniel Restrepo; Luis Uribe	3 m synchro	—N/a		398.67	2nd place, silver medalist(s)
Alejandro Solarte; Sebastián Villa	10 m synchro platform	—N/a		383.19	3rd place, bronze medalist(s)

Women

Athlete	Event	Preliminary		Final	
Athlete	Event	Score	Rank	Score	Rank
Daniela Zapata	1 m Springboard	230.85	6 Q	238.50	6
Viviana Uribe	3 m Springboard	238.20	11 Q	229.85	11
Daniela Zapata	3 m Springboard	244.35	10 Q	262.60	8
María Gómez	10 m platform	260.90	10 Q	215.25	12
Mariana Osorio	10 m platform	233.25	13 Q	272.80	7
Viviana Uribe; Daniela Zapata	3 m synchro	—N/a		254.70	5
María Gómez; Viviana Uribe	10 m synchro platform	—N/a		DNS	

== Equestrian ==
Colombia qualified a full team of 12 equestrians (four in Dressage, Eventing and Jumping).

=== Dressage ===
Athlete	Horse	Event	Prix St. Georges		Grand Prix Special			Grand Prix Freestyle	
Athlete	Horse	Event	Score	Rank	Score	Total	Rank	Score	Rank
María Aponte	Lord of the Dance	Individual	65.882	28	67.294	—N/a	23	70.400	18
Santiago Cardona	Dostojewski	Individual	65.088	31	65.206	—N/a	30	—N/a	
Juliana Gutiérrez	Flanissimo	Individual	66.029	26	66.059	—N/a	28	—N/a	
Andrea Vargas	Homerus P	Individual	65.294	29	67.235	—N/a	24	—N/a	
Juliana Gutiérrez; Santiago Cardona; María Aponte; Andrea Vargas	See above	Team	197.205	7	200.588	397.793	7	—N/a	

=== Eventing ===
Athlete	Horse	Event	Dressage		Cross-country		Jumping		Total	
Athlete	Horse	Event	Points	Rank	Points	Rank	Points	Rank	Points	Rank
Andrés Gómez	Caroline	Individual	51.5	32	—N/a					
Lucero Desrochers	Gama Castellon	Individual	41.5	21	—N/a					
Mauricio Bermúdez	Quinta Real	Individual	49.5	31	31.6	20	22.4	20	103.5	20
Juan Tafur	Blue Moon	Individual	40.8	20	—N/a					
Andrés Gómez; Lucero Desrochers; Mauricio Bermúdez; Juan Tafur	See above	Team	—N/a						2103.5	8

=== Jumping ===
Athlete	Horse	Event	Qualification								Final					
Athlete	Horse	Event	Round 1		Round 2		Round 3		Total		Round A		Round B		Total	
Athlete	Horse	Event	Faults	Rank	Faults	Rank	Faults	Rank	Faults	Rank	Faults	Rank	Faults	Rank	Faults	Rank
Roberto Terán	Dez Ooktoff	Individual	2.23	5	4	10	4	16	10.23	13 Q	4	=4	4	=2	18.23	7
John Pérez Bohm	Gigi-Carmen	Individual	4.34	15	EL		41	39	97.94	39	Did not advance					
René Lopez	Kheros Van 't Hoogeinde	Individual	0.72	2	8	21	4	16	12.72	17 Q	8	=10	9	16	29.72	16
Nicolás Gamboa	Nkh Mr. Darcy	Individual	5.15	21	8	21	12	31	25.15	25 Q	16	19	8	=11	49.15	19
René Lopez; John Pérez Bohm; Roberto Terán; Nicolás Gamboa	See above	Team	7.29	6	20	6	20	6	47.29	6	—N/a					

== Fencing ==
Colombia qualified a full team of 18 fencers (nine men and nine women), after all six teams finished at least in the top seven at the 2022 Pan American Fencing Championships in Asunción, Paraguay.

Individual
Men

Athlete	Event	Pool Round		Round of 16	Quarterfinals	Semifinals	Final	
Athlete	Event	Victories	Seed	Opposition Score	Opposition Score	Opposition Score	Opposition Score	Rank
Jhon Édison Rodríguez	Épée	4V–2D	5 Q	Roa (COL); W 15–10	Camargo (BRA); L 7–15	Did not advance		
Hernando Roa	Épée	2V–4D	12 Q	Rodríguez (COL); L 10–15	Did not advance			
David Ospina	Foil	1V–5D	16 Q	Itkin (USA); L 3–15	Did not advance			
Jorge Murillo Diaz	Foil	0V–6D	18	Did not advance				
Luis Correa Vila	Sabre	2V–4D	10 Q	Lucchetti (ARG); L 12–15	Did not advance			
Sebastian Cuellar	Sabre	2V–4D	11 Q	Doddo (USA); L 12–15	Did not advance			

Women

Athlete	Event	Pool Round		Round of 16	Quarterfinals	Semifinals	Final	
Athlete	Event	Victories	Seed	Opposition Score	Opposition Score	Opposition Score	Opposition Score	Rank
María Jaramillo	Épée	2V–4D	11 Q	Viveros (PAR); L 2–15	Did not advance			
Carmen Correa	Épée	2V–4D	14 Q	Doig (PER); L 9–15	Did not advance			
Tatiana Prieto	Foil	1V–5D	12 Q	Pistoia (BRA); L 11–15	Did not advance			
Juliana Pineda Valencia	Foil	1V–5D	17	Did not advance				
Jessica Morales	Sabre	3V–3D	8 Q	Botello (MEX); L 13–15	Did not advance			
María Angélica Blanco	Sabre	1V–5D	17	Did not advance				

Team

Athlete	Event	Quarterfinals	Semifinals/Consolation	Final / BM / PM	
Athlete	Event	Opposition Score	Opposition Score	Opposition Score	Rank
Juan Castillo; Jhon Édison Rodríguez; Hernando Roa	Men's épée	United States; L 41–45	5th-8th place classification Chile; L 34–43	7th place match Cuba; L 28–45	7
Miguel Grajales; Jorge Murillo; David Ospina	Men's foil	Canada; L 13–45	5th-8th place classification Mexico; L 35–45	7th place match Venezuela; L 40–45	8
Mario Palacios; Sebasián Cuéllar; Luis Correa Vila	Men's sabre	Brazil; W 45–24	Canada; L 44–45	Bronze medal match Venezuela; L 39–45	4
Laura Castillo; Carmen Correa; María Jaramillo	Women's épée	Brazil; L 34–45	5th-8th place classification Chile; W 45–29	5th place match Argentina; L 37–45	6
Juliana Pineda; María José Figueredo; Tatiana Prieto	Women's foil	Canada; L 25–45	5th-8th place classification Argentina; L 31–45	7th place match Peru; L 29–45	8
María Blanco; Jessica Morales; Valentina Beltrán	Women's sabre	Canada; L 26–45	5th-8th place classification Venezuela; L 41–45	7th place match Chile; W 45–24	7

== Football ==
Summary

Key

- A.E.T – After extra time.
- P – Match decided by penalty-shootout.

Team	Event	Group Stage				Semifinal	Final / BM	
Team	Event	Opposition Score	Opposition Score	Opposition Score	Rank	Opposition Score	Opposition Score	Rank
Colombia men's	Men's tournament	Honduras; W 2–0	Brazil; L 0–2	United States; L 0–2	3 q	—N/a	5th place match Uruguay; L 0–0 (3–4^{(p)})	6

=== Men's tournament ===
Colombia qualified a men's team of 18 athletes by virtue of its campaign in the 2023 South American U-20 Championship.

Group stage

Group B

Pos	Team	Pld	W	D	L	GF	GA	GD	Pts	Qualification
1	Brazil	3	3	0	0	6	0	+6	9	Semi-finals
2	United States	3	2	0	1	4	2	+2	6	Semi-finals
3	Colombia	3	1	0	2	2	4	−2	3	Fifth place match
4	Honduras	3	0	0	3	1	7	−6	0	Seventh place match

Source: Santiago2023
23 October 2023
13:00

Colombia	2–0	Honduras
Ruiz 16'; Cortés 41'	Report

Estadio Elías Figueroa Brander, Valparaíso
Referee: Fernando Véjar Diaz (Chile)

26 October 2023
20:00

Brazil	2–0	Colombia
Biro 16'; Pirani 51'	Report

Estadio Sausalito, Viña del Mar
Referee: José Burgos (Uruguay)

29 October 2023
18:00

Colombia	0–2	United States
	Report	Ikoba 63'; Neri 76'

Estadio Elías Figueroa Brander, Valparaíso
Referee: Fernando Véjar Diaz (Chile)

Fifth place match

1 November 2023
12:00

Uruguay	0–0	Colombia
	Report
Penalties
O'Neil (penalty scored); Nandín (penalty scored); Cruz de los Santos (penalty scored); Lavega (penalty scored); Piñeiro (penalty missed)	4–3	(penalty scored) Palacios; (penalty scored) Castilla; (penalty scored) Rojas; (penalty missed) Mosquera; (penalty missed) Ruiz

Estadio Elías Figueroa Brander, Valparaíso
Referee: Manuel Vergara (Chile)

== Golf ==
Colombia qualified a full team of 4 golfers (two men and two women).

Athlete	Event	Round 1	Round 2	Round 3	Round 4	Total		
Athlete	Event	Score	Score	Score	Score	Score	Par	Rank
Ricardo Celia	Men's individual	72	71	64	65	272	-16	4
Sebastián Muñoz	Men's individual	66	66	68	68	268	-20	2nd place, silver medalist(s)
Valery Plata	Women's individual	70	70	69	73	282	-6	4
Mariajo Uribe	Women's individual	69	73	68	68	278	-10	2nd place, silver medalist(s)

== Gymnastics ==
=== Artistic ===
Colombia qualified a team of ten gymnasts in artistic (five men and five women) at the 2023 Pan American Championships.

Men
Team & Individual Qualification

Athlete	Event	Final							
Athlete	Event	Apparatus						Total	Rank
Athlete	Event	F	PH	R	V	PB	HB	Total	Rank
Kristopher Bohórquez	Team	11.700	—N/a	13.666; Q	—N/a	12.886	~~11.400~~	—N/a	
Dilan Jiménez	Team	~~11.400~~	10.133	12766	13.433	13.633	12.300	73.665	23 Q
Juan Larrahondo	Team	13.800; Q	—N/a	~~11.900~~	14.300; Q	—N/a			
Andrés Martínez	Team	12.133	11.633	12.533	13.700	~~12.166~~	13.166	75.331	19 Q
Sergio Vargas	Team	—N/a	11.966	—N/a		13.133	12.800	—N/a	
Total	Team	37.633	33.732	38.965	41.433	39.632	38.266	229.661	7

Qualification Legend: Q = Qualified to apparatus final

Individual finals

Athlete	Event	Apparatus						Total	
Athlete	Event	F	PH	R	PB	V	HB	Score	Rank
Andrés Martínez	All-around	13.166	12.100	13.00	13.666	12.933	13.166	78.031	8
Dilan Jiménez	All-around	12.966	5.533	11.666	13.833	13.700	12.900	70.598	22
Juan Larrahondo	Vault	—N/a				13.816	—N/a		6
Juan Larrahondo	Floor	13.366	—N/a						3rd place, bronze medalist(s)
Kristopher Bohórquez	Rings	—N/a		13.666	—N/a				5

Women
Team & Individual Qualification

Athlete	Event	Apparatus				Total	
Athlete	Event	F	BB	V	UB	Score	Rank
Luisa Blanco	Team	11.933	12.266; Q	13.266	11.966	49.431	10 Q
Ginna Escobar	Team	~~10.166~~	~~9.033~~	12.666	11.700	43.565	33 R
Daira Lamadrid	Team	—N/a	11.700	—N/a	10.866	—N/a	
Angelica Mesa	Team	11.633	—N/a	~~12.466~~	~~9.466~~	—N/a	
Yiseth Valenzuela	Team	11.900	11.833	12.733	—N/a		
Total	Team	35.466	35.799	38.665	34.532	144.462	5

Qualification Legend: Q = Qualified to apparatus final

Individual finals

Athlete	Event	Apparatus				Total	
Athlete	Event	F	BB	V	UB	Score	Rank
Luisa Blanco	All-around	12.566	12.200	13.633	11.700	50.099	8
Luisa Blanco	Balance beam	—N/a	12.166	—N/a			7

=== Rhythmic ===
Colombia qualified two individual gymnasts and five gymnasts for the group event in rhythmic.

Individual

Athlete	Event	Apparatus				Total	
Athlete	Event	Ball	Clubs	Hoop	Ribbon	Score	Rank
Lina Dussan	All-around	28.150; Q	27.050; Q	27.550	22.500	105.250	11
Oriana Viñas	All-around	27.200	24.450	27.350	24.800	103.800	12
Lina Dussan	Ball	27.500	—N/a				8
Lina Dussan	Clubs	—N/a	27.350	—N/a			7

Group

Athlete	Event	Apparatus		Total	
Athlete	Event	5 balls	3 hoops + 2 clubs	Score	Rank
Kizzy Rivas; Natalia Jiménez; Karen Duarte; Laura Patiño; Adriana Mantilla	All-around	26.250	20.550	46.800	5
Kizzy Rivas; Natalia Jiménez; Karen Duarte; Laura Patiño; Adriana Mantilla	5 hoops	24.100	—N/a		5
Kizzy Rivas; Natalia Jiménez; Karen Duarte; Laura Patiño; Adriana Mantilla	3 ribbons + 2 balls	—N/a	22.350	—N/a	4

=== Trampoline ===
Colombia qualified two gymnasts in trampoline (two men) at the 2023 Pan American Championships.

Men

Athlete	Event	Qualification		Final	
Athlete	Event	Score	Rank	Score	Rank
Ángel Hernández	Individual	59.100	1 Q	58.930	1st place, gold medalist(s)
Álvaro Calero	Individual	51.840	11	Did not advance	
Ángel Hernández; Álvaro Calero	Synchronized	47.470	4 Q	31.990	6

Women

Athlete	Event	Qualification		Final	
Athlete	Event	Score	Rank	Score	Rank
Katish Hernández	Individual	DNS		Did not advance	

== Judo ==
Colombia has qualified 10 judokas (five men and five women).

Men

Athlete	Event	Round of 16	Quarterfinals	Semifinals	Repechage	Final / BM	
Athlete	Event	Opposition Result	Opposition Result	Opposition Result	Opposition Result	Opposition Result	Rank
Johan Rojas	−60 kg	Salas (VEN); W 01–00	Juárez (MEX); W 10–00	Fernández (CHI); W 10–00	Bye	Augusto (BRA); L 00–10	2nd place, silver medalist(s)
Juan Hernández	−66 kg	Pérez (CHI); W 01–00	Polanco (CUB); L 00–01	Did not advance	Lima (BRA); L 00–01	Did not advance	=7
Andrés Sandoval	−73 kg	Bye	Vega (CHI); W 10–00	Cargnin (BRA); L 00–10	Bye	Bronze medal match Cardoso (MEX); L 00–10	=5
Daniel Paz	−90 kg	Bye	Coto (ARG); L 00–10	Did not advance	Saucedo (USA); W 01–00	Bronze medal match Florentino (DOM); L 00–10	=5
Francisco Balanta	−100 kg	Bye	Santos (BRA); L 00–10	Did not advance	Angulo (ECU); W 10–00	Bronze medal match Gonçalves (BRA); W 01–00	3rd place, bronze medalist(s)

Women

Athlete	Event	Round of 16	Quarterfinals	Semifinals	Repechage	Final / BM	
Athlete	Event	Opposition Result	Opposition Result	Opposition Result	Opposition Result	Opposition Result	Rank
Erika Lasso	−48 kg	Soriano (DOM); W 11–00	Vargas (CHI); W 10–00	Nascimento (BRA); L 00–01	Bye	Bronze medal match Laborde (USA); L 01–10	=5
María Villalba	−57 kg	Bye	Gavidia (ECU); W 10–00	Silva (BRA); L 00–10	Bye	Bronze medal match Candela (USA); W 10–00	3rd place, bronze medalist(s)
Cindy Mera	−63 kg	Ortiz (ECU); W 10–00	Del Toro (CUB); L 00–01	Did not advance	Pérez (CHI); W 01–00	Bronze medal match Quadros (BRA); L 00–01	=5
Luisa Bonilla	−70 kg	Bye	Pérez (PUR); L 00–10	Did not advance	Castilhos (BRA); L 00–10	Did not advance	=7
Brigitte Carabalí	+78 kg	Bye	Williams (USA); W 10–00	Urdaneta (VEN); W 10–00	Bye	Ortiz (CUB); L 00–10	2nd place, silver medalist(s)

Mixed

Athlete	Event	Round of 16	Quarterfinal	Semifinal	Repechage	Final / BM	
Athlete	Event	Opposition Result	Opposition Result	Opposition Result	Opposition Result	Opposition Result	Rank
Brigitte Carabalí; Francisco Balanta; María Villalba; Luisa Bonilla; Daniel Paz; Andrés Sandoval	Team	Bye	Argentina; W 4–0	Brazil; L 0–4	Bye	Bronze medal match Mexico; W 4–2	3rd place, bronze medalist(s)

== Karate ==
Colombia qualified a team of 10 karatekas (five men and five women) in the 2023 Central American and Caribbean Championship and the 2023 Pan American Championships.

Kumite

Athlete	Event	Round robin					Semifinal	Final	
Athlete	Event	Opposition Result	Opposition Result	Opposition Result	Opposition Result	Rank	Opposition Result	Opposition Result	Rank
Juan Fernández	Men's −60 kg	De la Roca (EAI); W 8–0	Brose (BRA); L 3–3	Ruiz (USA); W 3–0	Bye	2 Q	Villalón (CHI); L 0–7	Did not advance	3rd place, bronze medalist(s)
José Ramírez	Men's −67 kg	Proaño (ECU); W 3–1	Gálvez (PAN); L 2–5	Navarro (ARG); W 5–2	Velozo (CHI); L 0–1	3	Did not advance		=5
Juan Landázuri	Men's −75 kg	Sobrinho (BRA); W 7–2	Kasturi (USA); W 5–0	Rodríguez (CHI); L 1–1	Maldonado (EAI); L 3–4	2 Q	Villarreal (MEX); L 0–0	Did not advance	3rd place, bronze medalist(s)
Rubén Henao	Men's −84 kg	Acevedo (ECU); W 8–1	Benavides (MEX); W 4–1	Servin (PAR); W 4–1	Bye	1 Q	Senpon (USA); W 7–2	Acevedo (ECU); L 2–3	2nd place, silver medalist(s)
Diego Lenis	Men's +84 kg	Oporta (NCA); L 3–7	Timmermans (ARU); L 0–2	Salgado (BRA); L 4–5	Bye	4	Did not advance		=7
Geraldine Peña	Women's −55 kg	Toro (CHI); W 6–5	Servin (PAR); W 9–1	Furumoto (CAN); W 0–0	Novak (ARG); L 2–4	1 Q	Torres (CUB); L 3–8	Did not advance	3rd place, bronze medalist(s)
Diana Ramírez	Women's −61 kg	Díaz (ARG); W 3–0	Wong (EAI); W 8–0	Chacón (CUB); L 3–6	Garcés (VEN); L 2–10	3	Did not advance		=5
Wendy Mosquera	Women's −68 kg	Lingl (USA); W 5–2	Velozo (CHI); W 7–7	Cabrera (PER); W 5–0	Bye	1 Q	Bratic (CAN); W 4–0	Rodrigues (BRA); L 2–4	2nd place, silver medalist(s)
Shanee Torres	Women's +68 kg	González (CHI); L 2–8	Padilha (BRA); L 3–4	Fernández (PER); W 1–0	Rodríguez (DOM); W 2–2	4	Did not advance		=7

Kata

Athlete	Event	Round robin				Final / BM	
Athlete	Event	Opposition Result	Opposition Result	Opposition Result	Rank	Opposition Result	Rank
Valentina Zapata	Women's individual	Armada (VEN); W 40.50–39.80	Laos-Loo (CAN); W 39.60–38.20	Orbe (ECU); W 39.90–38.10	1 Q	Komukai (USA); L 39.40–41.10	2nd place, silver medalist(s)

== Roller sports ==
=== Figure ===
Colombia qualified a team of two athletes in figure skating (one man and one woman). Colombia also qualified two athletes in figure skating (one man and one woman) after winning the event in the 2021 Junior Pan American Games

Athlete	Event	Short program		Long program		Total	
Athlete	Event	Score	Rank	Score	Rank	Score	Rank
Juan Sebastián Lemus	Men's	31.90	7	70.31	6	102.21	6
Deivi Rojas	Men's	63.38	4	101.35	3	164.73	3rd place, bronze medalist(s)
Paulina Ruiz	Women's	51.17	3	65.26	5	116.43	4
Sandra García	Women's	54.06	1	77.75	2	131.81	1st place, gold medalist(s)

=== Speed ===
Colombia qualified seven athletes in speed skating (three men and four women).

Men

Athlete	Event	Preliminary		Semifinal		Final	
Athlete	Event	Time	Rank	Time	Rank	Time	Rank
Andrés Jiménez	200 m time trial	—N/a				17.597	3rd place, bronze medalist(s)
Andrés Jiménez	500 m + distance	43.217	2 Q	43.699	1 Q	43.104	1st place, gold medalist(s)
Andrés Jiménez	1000 m sprint	1:23.987	1 Q	—N/a		1:24.151	2nd place, silver medalist(s)
Andrés Gómez	10,000 m elimination	—N/a				15:14.489	1st place, gold medalist(s)
Juan Mantilla	1000 m sprint	1:24.073	2 Q	—N/a		1:23.931	1st place, gold medalist(s)
Juan Mantilla	10,000 m elimination	—N/a				15:14.515	2nd place, silver medalist(s)

Women

Athlete	Event	Preliminary		Semifinal		Final	
Athlete	Event	Time	Rank	Time	Rank	Time	Rank
Geiny Pájaro	200 m time trial	—N/a				18.624	1st place, gold medalist(s)
Geiny Pájaro	500 m + distance	46.704	7 Q	45.778	1 Q	45.723	3rd place, bronze medalist(s)
Valeria Rodríguez	200 m time trial	—N/a				19.298	6
Valeria Rodríguez	500 m + distance	45.904	2 Q	46.005	3 q	46.399	6
Fabriana Arias	1000 m sprint	1:28.619	1 Q	—N/a		1:30.064	6
Fabriana Arias	10,000 m elimination	—N/a				17:46.877	1st place, gold medalist(s)
Gabriela Rueda	1000 m sprint	1:29.488	2 Q	—N/a		1:28.381	1st place, gold medalist(s)
Gabriela Rueda	10,000 m elimination	—N/a				17:47.448	2nd place, silver medalist(s)

=== Skateboarding ===
Colombia qualified a team of three athletes (one man and two women) in skateboarding.

Men

Athlete	Event	Score	Rank
Jhancarlos González	Street	247.82	3rd place, bronze medalist(s)

Women

Athlete	Event	Score	Rank
Nico Russi	Park	12.81	8
Jazmín Álvarez	Street	164.12	4

== Rowing ==
Colombia qualified one female athlete.

Women

Athlete	Event	Heat		Repechage		Semifinal		Final A/B	
Athlete	Event	Time	Rank	Time	Rank	Time	Rank	Time	Rank
Zulay Gil	Single sculls	9:13:75	4 R	8:32:52	5 FC	—N/a		8:50.45	14

== Rugby sevens ==
=== Women's tournament ===
Colombia qualified a women's team (of 12 athletes) by winning bronze medal in the Women's competition at the 2022 South American Games.

Summary

Team	Event	Group stage				Semifinal	Final / BM / Pl.	
Team	Event	Opposition Result	Opposition Result	Opposition Result	Rank	Opposition Result	Opposition Result	Rank
Colombia women	Women's tournament	Paraguay; W 32–7	United States; L 0–33	Jamaica; W 26–14	2 Q	Canada; L 14–45	Bronze medal match Brazil; L 45–0	4

== Sailing ==
Colombia qualified 4 boats for a total of 5 sailors.

Men

Athlete	Event	Opening series																		Finals				
Athlete	Event	1	2	3	4	5	6	7	8	9	10	11	12	13	14	15	16	Points	Rank	QF	SF	M / F	Points	Rank
Simón Gómez	IQFoil	4	7	8	7	(9)	(9)	(9)	8	5	9	7	9	2	9	9	9	93	9 Q	1	4	—N/a		5
Victor Bolaños	Kite	5	6	6	6	6	(10); DNF	(8)	5	(7)	6	5	6	3	4	2	6	66	6 Q	—N/a		6	—N/a	6

Women

Athlete	Event	Opening series																		Finals				
Athlete	Event	1	2	3	4	5	6	7	8	9	10	11	12	13	14	15	16	Points	Rank	QF	SF	M / F	Points	Rank
Ana Sofía Cifuentes	Sunfish	7	6	(10)	6	8	6	6	1	6	9	—N/a						55	6	Did not advance				
Lizeth Rojas	Kite	(4)	1	2	2	2	3	2	(4)	3	3	3	3	2	3	(4)	4	33	4 Q	—N/a		4	—N/a	4

== Shooting ==
Colombia qualified a total of four shooters in the 2022 Americas Shooting Championships. Colombia also qualified one shooter during the 2022 South American Games.

Men

Athlete	Event	Qualification		Final	
Athlete	Event	Points	Rank	Points	Rank
Juan Sebastián Rivera	10 m air pistol	563	17	Did not advance	
Alex Peralta	10 m air pistol	558	24	Did not advance	
Alex Peralta	25 m rapid fire pistol	562	11	Did not advance	
Esteban Caro	Trap	112	13	Did not advance	
Danilo Caro	Trap	107	19	Did not advance	

Women

Athlete	Event	Qualification		Final	
Athlete	Event	Points	Rank	Points	Rank
Juana Rueda	10 m air pistol	DSQ		Did not advance	
Juana Rueda	25 m pistol	559	13	Did not advance	

Mixed

Athlete	Event	Qualification		Final / BM	
Athlete	Event	Points	Rank	Opposition Result	Rank
Juana Rueda; Juan Sebastián Rivera	10 m air pistol	563	10	Did not advance	

== Squash ==
Colombia qualified a full team of six athletes (three men and three women) through the 2022 South American Games and the 2023 Pan American Squash Championships.

Men

Athlete	Event	Round of 16	Quarterfinal	Semifinal	Final	
Athlete	Event	Opposition Result	Opposition Result	Opposition Result	Opposition Result	Rank
Juan Camilo Vargas	Singles	Harrity (USA); W 3–0	Cárdenas (MEX); L 0–3	Did not advance		=5
Miguel Ángel Rodríguez	Singles	Enríquez (EAI); W 3–0	Romiglio (ARG); W 3–0	Salazar (MEX); W 3–0	Elías (PER); L 1–4	2nd place, silver medalist(s)
Juan Camilo Vargas; Ronald Palomino	Doubles	—N/a	Khan / Harrity (USA); W 2–0	Enríquez / Enríquez (EAI); W 2–0	Cárdenas / Salazar (MEX); W 2–1	1st place, gold medalist(s)
Juan Camilo Vargas; Miguel Ángel Rodríguez; Ronald Palomino	Team	—N/a	Chile; W 2–0	Canada; W 2–0	Argentina; W 2–0	1st place, gold medalist(s)

Women

Athlete	Event	Round of 16	Quarterfinal	Semifinal	Final	
Athlete	Event	Opposition Result	Opposition Result	Opposition Result	Opposition Result	Rank
Laura Tovar	Singles	López (MEX); L 2–3	Did not advance			=9
Lucía Bautista	Singles	Best (BAR); L 1–4	Did not advance			=9
Laura Tovar; Lucía Bautista	Doubles	—N/a	Todd / Naughton (CAN); W 2–1	Best / Prow (BAR); W 2–0	Sobhy / Weaver (USA); W 2–1	1st place, gold medalist(s)
Catalina Peláez; Laura Tovar; Lucía Bautista	Team	—N/a	Mexico; W 2–1	Canada; L 0–3	Did not advance	3rd place, bronze medalist(s)

Mixed

Athlete	Event	Quarterfinal	Semifinal	Final / BM	
Athlete	Event	Opposition Result	Opposition Result	Opposition Result	Rank
Miguel Ángel Rodríguez; Catalina Peláez	Doubles	Bye	Brownell / Clyne (USA); L 1–2	Did not advance	3rd place, bronze medalist(s)

== Surfing ==
Colombia qualified one female surfer to compete in two categories.

=== Shortboard ===
Athlete	Event	Round 1	Round 2	Round 3	Round 4	Repechage 1	Repechage 2	Repechage 3	Repechage 4	Repechage 5	Final / BM	
Athlete	Event	Opposition Result	Opposition Result	Opposition Result	Opposition Result	Opposition Result	Opposition Result	Opposition Result	Opposition Result	Opposition Result	Opposition Result	Rank
Izzi Gómez	Shortboard	Tuach (BAR); L 8.23–8.67	Did not advance			Aguirre (PER); L 5.50–6.66	Did not advance					=13

=== Longboard and SUP surf ===
Athlete	Event	Round 1		Round 2		Round 3	Round 4	Repechage round 1	Repechage round 2	Repechage round 3	Repechage round 4	Bronze medal heat	Final	Rank
Athlete	Event	Points	Rank	Points	Rank	Opposition Result	Opposition Result	Opposition Result	Opposition Result	Opposition Result	Opposition Result	Opposition Result	Opposition Result	Rank
Izzi Gómez	SUP surf	5.10	2 Q	8.17	2 Q	Torres (PER); W 7.43–3.47	Adisaka (BRA); L 2.73–6.30	Bye				Torres (PER); W 6.33–3.67	Adisaka (BRA); W 7.93–7.04	1st place, gold medalist(s)

== Swimming ==
Colombia qualified one male swimmer to the Open Water event during the 2022 South American Games. Colombia also qualified 3 swimmers (two male and one female) after by winning respective events in the 2021 Junior Pan American Games.

Key

- Note – Ranks given are for the entire round
- NR – National record
- FA – Qualified for Final A
- FB – Qualified for Final B

Men

Athlete	Event	Heat		Final	
Athlete	Event	Time	Rank	Time	Rank
Santiago Corredor	200 m freestyle	1:50.49	10 FA	1:50.10	8
Santiago Corredor	400 m freestyle	3:56.75	9 FB	DNS	
Juan Morales	400 m freestyle	3:56.34	8 FA	3:54.44	6
Sebastián Camacho	800 m freestyle	—N/a		8:18.44	14
Juan Morales	800 m freestyle	—N/a		8:05.49	5
Sebastián Camacho	1500 m freestyle	—N/a		16:20.87	17
Omar Pinzón	100 m backstroke	55.29	7 FA	55.16	7
Anthony Rincón	100 m backstroke	56.22	10 FB	56.70	14
Omar Pinzón	200 m backstroke	2:01.92	7 FA	2:01.42	5
Juan García	100 m breaststroke	1:02.77	13 FB	1:02.29	13
Jorge Murillo	100 m breaststroke	1:01.46	6 FA	1:01.15	4
Juan García	200 m breaststroke	2:23.00	19	Did not advance	
Jorge Murillo	200 m breaststroke	2:17.12	11 FB	DNS	
David Arias	100 m butterfly	53.97	8 FA	53.79	8
Esnaider Reales	100 m butterfly	53.99	9 FB	53.87	9
David Arias	200 m butterfly	2:01.14	9 FB	2:01.22	9
Juan García	200 m individual medley	2:06.66	15 FB	2:05.86	13
Omar Pinzón	200 m individual medley	2:03.47	10 FB	2:03.36	10
Sebastián Camacho	400 m individual medley	4:36.20	14 FB	DNS	
Juan Morales	10 km marathon	—N/a		1:50:41.0	10
Sebastián Camacho; Santiago Corredor; Juan Morales; Omar Pinzón; Esnaider Reales*	4 × 100 m freestyle relay	3:23.45	5 FA	3:23.40	7
David Arias; Sebastián Camacho; Santiago Corredor; Juan Morales; Esnaider Reales*	4 × 200 m freestyle relay	7:45.98	5 FA	7:31.89	5
David Arias; Juan Morales; Jorge Murillo; Omar Pinzón; Sebastián Camacho*; Anthony Rincón*; Esnaider Reales*	4 × 100 m medley relay	3:45.07	5 FA	3:39.91 NR	5

Women

Athlete	Event	Heat		Final	
Athlete	Event	Time	Rank	Time	Rank
Isabella Arcila	50 m freestyle	25.92	11 FB	DNS	
Sirena Rowe	50 m freestyle	25.63	7 FA	25.84	7
Isabella Bedoya	100 m freestyle	58.16	22	Did not advance	
Karen Durango	100 m freestyle	57.42	13 FB	57.75	14
Karen Durango	200 m freestyle	2:04.04	14 FB	DNS	
Isabella Arcila	100 m backstroke	1:02.20	7 FA	1:02.19	7
Jazmín Pistelli	200 m backstroke	2:20.81	16 FB	2:23.02	16
Stefanía Gómez	100 m breaststroke	1:08.47	4 FA	1:07.92 NR	4
Stefanía Gómez	200 m breaststroke	2:35.47	11 FB	2:35.46	13
Valentina Becerra	100 m butterfly	59.70	3 FA	59.21 NR	4
Karen Durango	100 m butterfly	1:02.31	14 FB	1:00.98	13
Samantha Baños	200 m butterfly	2:15.65	9 FB	2:15.24	9
Karen Durango	200 m butterfly	2:14.39	5 FA	2:15.18	5
Stefanía Gómez	200 m individual medley	2:17.08	6 FA	2:16.92	5
Laura Melo	200 m individual medley	2:22.38	13 FB	2:20.92	11
Samantha Baños	400 m individual medley	5:01.27	9 FB	4:59.60	10
Isabella Arcila; Isabella Bedoya; Karen Durango; Sirena Rowe; Valentina Becerra*	4 × 100 m freestyle relay	3:48.63	5 FA	3:48.21	7
Isabella Bedoya; Karen Durango; Laura Melo; Jazmín Pistelli	4 × 200 m freestyle relay	8:41.45	9	Did not advance	
Isabella Arcila; Valentina Becerra; Stefanía Gómez; Sirena Rowe; Karen Durango*	4 × 100 m medley relay	4:10.54	3 FA	4:04.79 NR	4

Mixed

Athlete	Event	Heat		Final	
Athlete	Event	Time	Rank	Time	Rank
Sebastián Camacho; Santiago Corredor; Isabella Arcila; Sirena Rowe; Juan García*; Isabella Bedoya*	4 × 100 m freestyle relay	3:36.28	4 FA	3:34.18	6
Jorge Murillo; Omar Pinzón; Valentina Becerra; Sirena Rowe; Juan García*; Anthony Rincón*; Karen Durango*	4 × 100 m medley relay	3:58.46	4 FA	3:50.43	4

== Table tennis ==
Colombia qualified a team of five athletes (two men and three women) through the 2023 Special Qualification Event.

Men

Athlete	Event	Group stage				First round	Second round	Quarterfinal	Semifinal	Final / BM	
Athlete	Event	Opposition Result	Opposition Result	Opposition Result	Rank	Opposition Result	Opposition Result	Opposition Result	Opposition Result	Opposition Result	Rank
Santiago Montes	Singles	—N/a				Liang (USA); L 0–4	Did not advance				=17
Julián Ramos	Singles	—N/a				Wang (CAN); L 0–4	Did not advance				=17
Santiago Montes; Julián Ramos	Doubles	—N/a					Fernández / Hidalgo (PER); L 0–4	Did not advance			=9

Women

Athlete	Event	Group stage				First round	Second round	Quarterfinal	Semifinal	Final / BM	
Athlete	Event	Opposition Result	Opposition Result	Opposition Result	Rank	Opposition Result	Opposition Result	Opposition Result	Opposition Result	Opposition Result	Rank
Cory Téllez	Singles	—N/a				Díaz (PUR); L 1–4	Did not advance				=17
María Perdomo	Singles	—N/a				Cordero (EAI); W 4–1	Cossio (MEX); L 0–4	Did not advance			=9
Cory Téllez; María Perdomo	Doubles	—N/a					González / Obando (VEN); L 3–4	Did not advance			=9
Cory Téllez; Juliana Lozada; María Perdomo	Team	—N/a	Brazil; L 1–3	Chile; L 0–3	3	—N/a		Did not advance			=9

Mixed

Athlete	Event	First Round	Quarterfinal	Semifinal	Final / BM	
Athlete	Event	Opposition Result	Opposition Result	Opposition Result	Opposition Result	Rank
Santiago Montes; María Perdomo	Doubles	Cifuentes / Argüelles (ARG); L 0–4	Did not advance			=9

== Taekwondo ==
Colombia has qualified a male athlete at a Kyorugi event, by virtue of his title in the 2021 Junior Pan American Games. Colombia also qualified 6 athletes (three men and three women) during the Pan American Games Qualification Tournament.

Kyorugi
Men

Athlete	Event	Round of 16	Quarterfinals	Semifinals	Repechage	Final / BM	
Athlete	Event	Opposition Result	Opposition Result	Opposition Result	Opposition Result	Opposition Result	Rank
Jhon Garrido	–58 kg	Contreras (CHI); W 2–0	Guzmán (ARG); L 0–2	Did not advance	Barreto (PER); W 2–0	Bronze medal final Park (CAN); W 2–0	3rd place, bronze medalist(s)
David Paz	–68 kg	De Luis (PUR); W 2–0	Pontes (BRA); W 2–1	Harris (USA); L 0–2	Bye	Bronze medal final Acuña (ARG); L 0–2	=5
Miguel Trejos	–80 kg	Calderón (CUB); W 2–0	Hernández (DOM); W 2–0	Robleto (NCA); W 2–0	Bye	Nickolas (USA); L 0–2	2nd place, silver medalist(s)
Luis Soto	+80 kg	Parker (USA); W 2–0	Healy (USA); L 0–2	Did not advance	—N/a	Bronze medal final Bergeron (CAN); L 1–2	=5
David Paz; Jhon Garrido; Miguel Trejos	Team	Bye	Chile; L 76–83	Did not advance			=5

Women

Athlete	Event	Round of 16	Quarterfinals	Semifinals	Repechage	Final / BM	
Athlete	Event	Opposition Result	Opposition Result	Opposition Result	Opposition Result	Opposition Result	Rank
Andrea Ramírez	–49 kg	Bye	Sendra (ARG); W 2–0	Grippoli (URU); W 2–0	Bye	Souza (MEX); L 1–2	2nd place, silver medalist(s)
Laura Ramírez	–67 kg	Kraayeveld (CAN); L DSQ	Did not advance				
Gloria Mosquera	+67 kg	Bye	Heredia (MEX); W 2–0	Shipman (HAI); W 2–0	Bye	Gorman-Shore (USA); L 1–2	2nd place, silver medalist(s)
Gloria Mosquera; Andrea Ramírez; Laura Ramírez	Team	Argentina; W 32–24	Dominican Republic; L 66–63	Did not advance			=5

== Tennis ==
Colombia qualified a full team of six athletes (three men and three women). The team was officially named on October 2, 2023.

Men

Athlete	Event	Round of 64	Round of 32	Round of 16	Quarterfinal	Semifinal	Final / BM	
Athlete	Event	Opposition Result	Opposition Result	Opposition Result	Opposition Result	Opposition Result	Opposition Result	Rank
Nicolás Mejía	Singles	Bye	Phillips (JAM); W 5–7, 6–4, 6–4	Bagnis (ARG); L 3–6, 4–6	Did not advance			
Adria Soriano	Singles	Obando (HON); W 6–1, 6–1	Bueno (PER); W 6–3, 6–4	Díaz Acosta (ARG); L 2–6, 4–6	Did not advance			
Nicolás Barrientos; Nicolás Mejía	Doubles	—N/a	Bye	Barrios / Tabilo (CHI); W 6–7^{(1–7)}, 0–6	Did not advance			

Women

Athlete	Event	Round of 32	Round of 16	Quarterfinal	Semifinal	Final / BM	
Athlete	Event	Opposition Result	Opposition Result	Opposition Result	Opposition Result	Opposition Result	Rank
María Herazo González	Singles	Bye	Suarez (VEN); L 4–6, 6–7^{(6–8)}	Did not advance			
María Paulina Pérez	Singles	Bye	Zeballos (BOL); L 6–0, 5–7, 5–7	Did not advance			
Yuliana Lizarazo	Singles	Bye	Obando (HON); W 6–0, 6–1	Capurro (ARG); W 6–4, 6–1	Marino (CAN); L 5–7, 6–4, 4–6	Did not advance	
Yuliana Lizarazo; María Paulina Pérez	Doubles	—N/a	Bye	Iamachkine / Pérez (PER); W 7–5, 6–4	Carlé / Riera (ARG); W 7–6^{(7–5)}, 2–6, [10–5]	Pigossi / Stefani (BRA); L 5–7, 3–6	2nd place, silver medalist(s)

Mixed

Athlete	Event	Round of 16	Quarterfinal	Semifinal	Final / BM	
Athlete	Event	Opposition Result	Opposition Result	Opposition Result	Opposition Result	Rank
Yuliana Lizarazo; Nicolás Barrientos	Doubles	—N/a	Britez / Vergara (PAR); W 6–3, 4–6, [10–4]	Ccuno / Huertas del Pino (PER); W 6–3, 7–6^{(7–4)}	Stefani / Demoliner (BRA); W 6–3, 6–4	1st place, gold medalist(s)

== Triathlon ==
Colombia qualified a triathlon team of four athletes (two men and two women).

Athlete	Event	Swim (1.5 km)	Trans 1	Bike (40 km)	Trans 2	Run (10 km)	Total	Rank
Brian Moya	Men's individual	18:42	0:48	1:00:02	0:30	35:17	1:55:21	26
Carlos Quinchara	Men's individual	18:43	0:56	59:55	0:34	36:00	1:56:10	27
Diana Castillo	Women's individual	19:09	1:08	1:02:04	0:30	36:56	1:59:47	10
Carolina Velásquez	Women's individual	19:24	0:53	1:02:03	0:29	34:37	1:57:28	2nd place, silver medalist(s)

Mixed relay

Athlete	Event	Swimming (300 m)	Transition 1	Biking (6.6 km)	Transition2	Running (1.5 km)	Total	Rank
Brian Moya	Mixed relay	3:25	0:44	8:42	0:23	4:43	17:59	—N/a
Diana Castillo	Mixed relay	3:56	0:52	9:39	0:30	5:21	38:19	—N/a
Carlos Quinchara	Mixed relay	3:53	1:03	9:25	0:23	4:52	57:58	—N/a
Carolina Velásquez	Mixed relay	4:12	0:49	9:57	0:23	5:23	1:18:45	—N/a
Total	Mixed relay	—N/a					1:18:45	7

== Volleyball ==
=== Men's tournament ===
Colombia qualified a men's team (of 12 athletes) by finishing third in the CSV Qualifying Tournament.

Summary

Team	Event	Group stage				Semifinal	Final / BM / Pl.	
Team	Event	Opposition Result	Opposition Result	Opposition Result	Rank	Opposition Result	Opposition Result	Rank
Colombia men	Men's tournament							

=== Women's tournament ===
Colombia qualified a women's team (of 12 athletes) by finishing second in the CSV Qualifying Tournament.

Summary

Team	Event	Group stage				Semifinal	Final / BM / Pl.	
Team	Event	Opposition Result	Opposition Result	Opposition Result	Rank	Opposition Result	Opposition Result	Rank
Colombia women	Women's tournament							

== Water skiing ==
Colombia qualified two wakeboarders (one of each gender) during the 2022 Pan American Championship.

Colombia also qualified four water skiers during the 2022 Pan American Water skiing Championship.

Men

Athlete	Event	Preliminary		Final				
Athlete	Event	Score	Rank	Slalom	Jump	Tricks	Total	Rank
Pablo Alvira	Slalom							
Pablo Alvira	Jump							
Pablo Alvira	Tricks							
Pablo Alvira	Overall							
Santiago Jaramillo	Slalom							
Santiago Jaramillo	Jump							
Santiago Jaramillo	Overall							

Women

Athlete	Event	Preliminary		Final				
Athlete	Event	Score	Rank	Slalom	Jump	Tricks	Total	Rank
Martina Piedrahita	Slalom							
Martina Piedrahita	Jump							
Martina Piedrahita	Tricks							
Martina Piedrahita	Overall							
Daniela Verswyvel	Slalom							
Daniela Verswyvel	Tricks							
Daniela Verswyvel	Overall							

Wakeboard
Men

Athlete	Event	Preliminary		Repechage		Final				
Athlete	Event	Score	Rank	Score	Rank	Slalom	Jump	Tricks	Total	Rank
Jorge Rocha	Men's wakeboard					—N/a				
Manuela Durán	Women's wakeboard			—N/a						

== Weightlifting ==
Colombia qualified a full team of seven weightlifters (four men and three women) after the 2021 and 2022 editions of the Pan American Weightlifting Championships. Colombia also qualified five weightlifters (Four men and two women) after winning the event in the 2021 Junior Pan American Games.

Men

Athlete	Event	Snatch		Clean & jerk		Total	
Athlete	Event	Weight	Rank	Weight	Rank	Weight	Rank
Estiven Villar	61 kg	124	3	149	5	273	5
Juan Martínez	73 kg	138	5	173	3	311	4
Luis Javier Mosquera	73 kg	153	2	180	2	333	2nd place, silver medalist(s)
Yeison López	89 kg	177 AM	1	205	2	382	2nd place, silver medalist(s)
Yeison López Cuello	102 kg	163	5	202	4	365	4
Jhonatan Rivas	102 kg	176	1	206	2	382	1st place, gold medalist(s)
Luis Quiñones	+102 kg	160	7	200	6	360	7
Rafael Cerro	+102 kg	185	2	225	1	410	1st place, gold medalist(s)

Women

Athlete	Event	Snatch		Clearn & jerk		Total	
Athlete	Event	Weight	Rank	Weight	Rank	Weight	Rank
Yenny Álvarez	59 kg	102	1	126	1	228	1st place, gold medalist(s)
Concepción Úsuga	59 kg	99	4	120	5	219	5
Julieth Rodríguez	71 kg	98	7	120	7	218	7
Mari Sánchez	71 kg	112	2	134	3	246	2nd place, silver medalist(s)
Hellen Escobar	81 kg	101	7	127	7	228	8

== Wrestling ==
Colombia qualified 11 wrestlers (eight men and three women) through the 2022 Pan American Wrestling Championships and the 2023 Pan American Wrestling Championships.

Key:

- VT – Victory by fall.
- PP – Decision by points – the loser with technical points.
- PO – Decision by points – the loser without technical points.
- SP – Technical superiority – the loser with technical points and a margin of victory of at least 9 (Greco-Roman) or 10 (freestyle) points.
- ST – Great superiority – the loser without technical points and a margin of victory of at least 8 (Greco-Roman) or 10 (freestyle) points.
- VA – Decision by withdrawal

Men

Athlete	Event	Quarterfinal	Semifinal	Final / BM	
Athlete	Event	Opposition Result	Opposition Result	Opposition Result	Rank
	Freestyle 57 kg				
	Freestyle 65 kg				
	Freestyle 86 kg				
	Freestyle 97 kg				
	Greco-Roman 60 kg				
	Greco-Roman 67 kg				
	Greco-Roman 77 kg				
	Greco-Roman 87 kg				

Women

Athlete	Event	Quarterfinal	Semifinal	Final / BM	
Athlete	Event	Opposition Result	Opposition Result	Opposition Result	Rank
	62 kg				
	68 kg				
	76 kg				

== See also ==
- Colombia at the 2024 Summer Olympics
