= Roller sports at the 2023 Pan American Games – Men's 200 metres time-trial =

Men's 200 metres time trial in roller sports at the 2023 Pan American Games
- Venue: Patinódromo
- Dates: November 4
- Competitors: 11 from 11 nations

Medalists
Gold medal	Emanuelle Silva	Chile
Silver medal	Jorge Martínez	Mexico
Bronze medal	Andrés Jiménez	Colombia

The men's speed skating 200 metres time trial in roller sports at the 2023 Pan American Games was held on November 4 at the Patinódromo in Santiago.

== Schedule ==
All times are Chilean Summer Time (UTC-3).

Date	Time	Round
November 4, 2023	9:30	Final

== Results ==
11 athletes from 11 countries competed.

Rank	Name	Nation	Time
1st place, gold medalist(s)	Emanuelle Silva	Chile	17.562
2nd place, silver medalist(s)	Jorge Martínez	Mexico	17.566
3rd place, bronze medalist(s)	Andrés Jiménez	Colombia	17.597
4	Guilherme Rocha	Brazil	17.765
5	Nahuel Quevedo	Argentina	18.075
6	Renato Carchi	Ecuador	18.348
7	José Carlos Rangel	Venezuela	18.354
8	Marvin Gómez	El Salvador	18.461
9	Jacob Anderson	United States	18.478
10	Marlon Arroyo	Costa Rica	18.515
11	José Daniel Moncada	Paraguay	18.578
