= Roller sports at the 2023 Pan American Games – Men's free skating =

Men's free skating at the 2023 Pan American Games
- Venue: Velódromo
- Dates: November 3–4
- Competitors: 8 from 7 nations
- Winning score: 188.21

Medalists
Gold medal	Erik Medziukevicius	Brazil
Silver medal	Franco Vito	Argentina
Bronze medal	Deivi Rojas	Colombia

The men's artistic skating free skating at the 2023 Pan American Games in Santiago, Chile was held between November 3–4 at the Velódromo.

Erik Medziukevicius from Brazil claimed the gold medal with a great performance at the long program, after finishing second during the short program. This title represented Brazil's return to the top of the podium after Marcel Stürmer's four-title sequence until 2015.

== Results ==
8 athletes from 7 countries competed.
The results were as below.

Rank	Name	Nation	SP	Rank	LP	Rank	Total points
1st place, gold medalist(s)	Erik Medziukevicius	Brazil	73.61	1	114.60	2	188.21
2nd place, silver medalist(s)	Franco Vito	Argentina	66.31	2	116.09	1	182.40
3rd place, bronze medalist(s)	Deivi Rojas	Colombia	63.38	4	101.35	3	164.73
4	Victor López	Paraguay	65.33	3	94.50	4	159.83
5	Collin Motley	United States	52.97	5	81.11	5	134.08
6	Juan Sebastián Lemus	Colombia	31.90	7	70.31	6	102.21
7	Agustín Navarrete	Chile	36.49	6	62.11	7	98.60
8	Santiago Casique	Mexico	29.17	8	56.63	8	85.80
