= Roller sports at the 2023 Pan American Games – Women's free skating =

Women's free skating at the 2023 Pan American Games
- Venue: Velódromo
- Dates: November 3–4
- Competitors: 8 from 7 nations
- Winning score: 131.81

Medalists
| Gold medal | Sandra García | Colombia |
| Silver medal | Bianca Ameixeiro | Brazil |
| Bronze medal | Martina Della Chiesa | Argentina |

The women's artistic skating free skating at the 2023 Pan American Games in Santiago, Chile was held between November 3–4 at the Velódromo.

Sandra García from Colombia claimed the first ever gold medal for her country in artistic skating, after winning the short program and finishing second in the long program, close to Bianca Ameixeiro, who took silver after finishing fourth in the first day.

== Results ==
9 athletes from 8 countries competed.
The results were as below.

| Rank | Name | Nation | SP | Rank | LP | Rank | Total points |
|---|---|---|---|---|---|---|---|
| 1st place, gold medalist(s) | Sandra García | Colombia | 54.06 | 1 | 77.75 | 2 | 131.81 |
| 2nd place, silver medalist(s) | Bianca Ameixeiro | Brazil | 45.52 | 4 | 78.48 | 1 | 124.00 |
| 3rd place, bronze medalist(s) | Martina Della Chiesa | Argentina | 51.88 | 2 | 69.92 | 3 | 121.80 |
| 4 | Paulina Ruiz | Colombia | 51.17 | 3 | 65.26 | 5 | 116.43 |
| 5 | Valentina Lomas | Mexico | 38.15 | 6 | 68.96 | 4 | 107.11 |
| 6 | Samantha Krusza | United States | 40.48 | 5 | 57.75 | 7 | 98.23 |
| 7 | Mailen Olivares | Chile | 31.26 | 9 | 59.83 | 6 | 91.09 |
| 8 | Romina Ascarate | Uruguay | 34.18 | 7 | 49.56 | 8 | 83.74 |
| 9 | Micaela Maercelloni | Dominican Republic | 31.82 | 8 | 46.84 | 9 | 78.66 |
