= Archery at the 2023 Pan American Games – Men's team compound =

Men's team compound at the 2023 Pan American Games
- Venue: Archery Center
- Dates: November 1 – November 4
- Competitors: 12 from 6 nations

Medalists
| Gold medal | Roberto Hernández; Douglas Nolasco | El Salvador |
| Silver medal | Kris Schaff; Sawyer Sullivan | United States |
| Bronze medal | Sebastián Arenas; Jagdeep Singh | Colombia |

The men's team compound competition of the archery events at the 2023 Pan American Games was held from November 1 to 4 at the Archery Center in Santiago, Chile.

== Schedule ==
| Date | Time | Round |
|---|---|---|
| November 1, 2023 | 14:00 | Ranking Round |
| November 1, 2023 | 16:20 | Quarterfinals |
| November 1, 2023 | 16:45 | Semifinals |
| November 4, 2023 | 9:38 | Final |

== Results ==
=== Ranking round ===
The results were as follows:

| Rank | Archer | Nation | Score |
|---|---|---|---|
| 1 | Kris Schaff; Sawyer Sullivan | United States | 1418 |
| 2 | Jagdeep Singh; Sebastián Arenas | Colombia | 1412 |
| 3 | Roberto Hernández; Douglas Nolasco | El Salvador | 1406 |
| 4 | Sebastián García; Juan del Río | Mexico | 1398 |
| 5 | Julio Barillas; Pedro Salazar | Independent Athletes Team | 1395 |
| 6 | Andrew Fagan; Tristan Spicer-Moran | Canada | 1389 |

=== Competition rounds ===
The results during the elimination rounds and final rounds were as follows:

==== Draw ====
Round of 16
5 | Independent Athletes Team | 155
4 | Mexico | 159
3 | El Salvador | 158
6 | Canada | 153

Quarterfinals
1 | United States | 158
4 | Mexico | 157
3 | El Salvador | 158
2 | Colombia | 155

Semifinais
1 | United States | 156
3 | El Salvador | 158
Final
4 | Mexico | 156-T19
2 | Colombia | 156-T20
