= Emanuelle Silva =

Chilean road skater

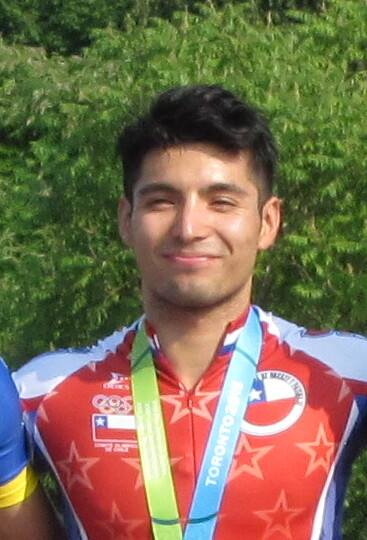
- Silva in 2015

Sport
- Country: Chile
- Sport: Road skating
Medal record
Road skating
Representing Chile
Pan American Games
Gold medal – first place	2015 Toronto	200 m time-trial
Gold medal – first place	2023 Santiago	200 m time trial
Silver medal – second place	2011 Guadalajara	300 m time-trial
Bronze medal – third place	2023 Santiago	500 m + distance
Bolivarian Games
Gold medal – first place	2013 Trujillo	Men's 200 metres C/R
Silver medal – second place	2017 Santa Marta	Men's 300 m CRI
Bronze medal – third place	2017 Santa Marta	Men's 500 m sprint
Bronze medal – third place	2022 Valledupar	Men's 200 m
Bronze medal – third place	2022 Valledupar	Men's 500 m
South American Games
Gold medal – first place	2022 Asuncion	Men's 200 m
Bronze medal – third place	2022 Asuncion	Men's 500 m

Emanuelle Silva Santibañez is a Chilean road skater. He participated at the 2011 and 2015 Pan American Games, winning a gold medal in the 200m time trial.

Silva then participated at the Bolivarian Games and also at the 2017 World Games in the road speed skating competition, winning no medal.

In 2022, he participated at the 2022 South American Games in the roller sports competition, where he was awarded a gold medal in the men's 200m event.
