= Golf at the 2023 Pan American Games – Men's individual =

Golf – Men's individual at the 2023 Pan American Games
- Venue: Prince of Wales Country Club
- Start date: 2 November 2023
- End date: 5 November 2023
- Competitors: 30 from 17 nations
- Winning score: 267 (–21)

Medalists
Gold medal	Abraham Ancer	Mexico
Silver medal	Sebastián Muñoz	Colombia
Bronze medal	Dylan Menante	United States

The men's individual competition of the golf events at the 2023 Pan American Games was held between 2 and 5 November at the Prince of Wales Country Club in La Reina, Chile.

== Schedule ==
All times are CLST (UTC−4).

Date	Time	Round
2 November 2023	8:00	Round 1
3 November 2023	8:00	Round 2
4 November 2023	8:00	Round 3
5 November 2023	7:00	Round 4/Final

== Results ==
The final results were:

Rank	Name	Nation	Round 1	Round 2	Round 3	Round 4	Total
1st place, gold medalist(s)	Abraham Ancer	Mexico	68	67	65	67	267 (–21)
2nd place, silver medalist(s)	Sebastián Muñoz	Colombia	66	66	68	68	268 (–20)
3rd place, bronze medalist(s)	Dylan Menante (a)	United States	66	69	70	66	271 (–17)
4	Ricardo Celia	Colombia	72	71	64	65	272 (–16)
4	Etienne Papineau	Canada	63	71	67	71	272 (–16)
6	Joaquín Niemann	Chile	67	70	71	65	273 (–15)
6	José Toledo	Independent Athletes Team	70	67	67	69	273 (–15)
8	José Pablo Rolz	Independent Athletes Team	70	69	67	71	277 (–11)
9	Fabrizio Zanotti	Paraguay	66	70	71	71	278 (–10)
10	Mito Pereira	Chile	68	68	72	71	279 (–9)
11	Alejandro Tosti	Argentina	74	69	69	68	280 (–8)
11	Myles Creighton	Canada	73	68	70	69	280 (–8)
11	Justin Hastings	Cayman Islands	72	71	63	74	280 (–8)
14	Kelvin Hernandez	Puerto Rico	74	71	68	69	282 (–6)
14	Carlos Ortiz	Mexico	71	64	71	76	282 (–6)
16	Stewart Hagestad (a)	United States	71	71	70	71	283 (–5)
17	Joaquin Lolas	Peru	70	73	72	69	284 (–4)
17	Virgilio Paz	Venezuela	71	67	76	70	284 (–4)
19	Jorge Fernández-Valdés	Argentina	75	71	67	73	286 (–2)
20	Rodrigo Lee	Brazil	76	71	71	69	287 (–1)
21	Juan Cristian Terceros	Bolivia	69	73	72	74	288 (E)
22	Miguel Ordonez (a)	Panama	74	72	72	71	289 (+1)
23	Erich Fortlage (a)	Paraguay	73	70	73	74	290 (+2)
24	Luis Barco	Peru	76	73	73	70	292 (+4)
25	Andrey Borges	Brazil	73	76	74	70	293 (+5)
25	Flavio Cesar Sameja	Bolivia	80	72	70	71	293 (+5)
27	Jean Paul Ducruet (a)	Panama	75	75	73	74	297 (+9)
27	Richard Gibson (a)	Bahamas	77	72	73	75	297 (+9)
29	Chris Richards (a)	Trinidad and Tobago	83	76	69	75	303 (+15)
30	Rocco Saraceni	Venezuela	74	81	76	79	310 (+22)

(a) denotes an amateur
