= El Salvador at the 2023 Pan American Games =

- IOC code: ESA
- NOC: El Salvador Olympic Committee

in Santiago 20 October 2023 – 5 November 2023
- Competitors: 81 in 23 sports
- Flag bearer (opening): Amado de Jesús Alvarado & Sindy Portillo
- Flag bearer (closing): Roberto Hernández & Ivonne Nóchez
- Medals Ranked =19th: Gold 1 Silver 1 Bronze 2 Total 4

Pan American Games appearances (overview)
- 1951; 1955; 1959; 1963; 1967; 1971; 1975; 1979; 1983; 1987; 1991; 1995; 1999; 2003; 2007; 2011; 2015; 2019; 2023

El Salvador competed at the 2023 Pan American Games in Santiago, Chile from October 20 to November 5, 2023. This was El Salvador's 19th appearance at the Pan American Games, having competed at every edition of the games.

On 5 October 2023, the El Salvador Olympic Committee officially named the team of 80 athletes (35 men and 45 women) competing in 23 sports (e-sports total of 1 is not included).

Surfers Amado de Jesús Alvarado and Sindy Portillo were the country's flagbearers during the opening ceremony. Meanwhile, archer Roberto Hernández and roller speed skater Ivonne Nóchez were the country's flagbearers during the closing ceremony.

== Competitors ==
The following is the list of number of competitors (per gender) participating at the games per sport/discipline.

Sport	Men	Women	Total
Archery	3	3	6
Artistic swimming	0	9	9
Athletics	1	1	2
Badminton	3	3	6
Basketball	4	4	8
Bowling	0	2	2
Boxing	1	0	1
Equestrian	1	0	1
Gymnastics	1	1	2
Judo	2	0	2
Karate	1	1	2
Roller sports	1	1	2
Rowing	1	1	2
Sailing	1	1	2
Shooting	5	4	9
Surfing	1	2	3
Swimming	5	6	11
Table tennis	1	1	2
Taekwondo	0	1	1
Tennis	0	1	1
Volleyball	2	2	4
Weightlifting	1	1	2
Wrestling	0	1	1
Total	35	46	81

== Medalists ==
The following Salvadoran competitors won medals at the games. In the by discipline sections below, medalists' names are bolded.

Medal	Name	Sport	Event	Date
Gold	Roberto Hernández; Douglas Nolasco	Archery	Men's team compound	November 4
Silver	Ivonne Nóchez	Roller sport	Women's 200 metres time-trial	November 4
Bronze	Jorge Merino	Karate	Men's 84 kg	October 23
Bronze	Uriel Canjura	Badminton	Men's singles	October 24

== Archery ==
El Salvador qualified four archers during the 2022 Pan American Archery Championships. El Salvador also qualified two archers during the 2023 Copa Merengue.

Men

Athlete	Event	Ranking Round		Round of 32	Round of 16	Quarterfinals	Semifinals	Final / BM	Rank
Athlete	Event	Score	Seed	Opposition Score	Opposition Score	Opposition Score	Opposition Score	Opposition Score	Rank
Oscar Guillén	Individual recurve								
Douglas Nolasco	Individual compound								
Roberto Hernández	Individual compound								
Douglas Nolasco; Roberto Hernández	Team compound			—					

Women

Athlete	Event	Ranking Round		Round of 32	Round of 16	Quarterfinals	Semifinals	Final / BM	Rank
Athlete	Event	Score	Seed	Opposition Score	Opposition Score	Opposition Score	Opposition Score	Opposition Score	Rank
Marcela Cortez	Individual recurve								
Paola Corado	Individual compound								
Sofía Paiz	Individual compound								
Paola Corado; Sofía Paiz	Team compound			—					

Mixed

Athlete	Event	Ranking Round		Round of 32	Round of 16	Quarterfinals	Semifinals	Final / BM	Rank
Athlete	Event	Score	Seed	Opposition Score	Opposition Score	Opposition Score	Opposition Score	Opposition Score	Rank
Oscar Guillén; Marcela Cortez	Team recurve			—					
	Team compound			—					

== Artistic swimming ==
El Salvador qualified a full team of nine artistic swimmers after finishing third in the 2022 Central American and Caribbean Games.

Athlete	Event	Technical Routine		Free Routine (Final)			
Athlete	Event	Points	Rank	Points	Rank	Total Points	Rank
Cesia Castaneda; Grecia Mendoza	Women's duet						
Andrea Mercado; Brigitte Guadrón; Cesia Castaneda; Daira Sánchez; Gabriela Magaña; Gabriela Mercado; Gabriela Moran; Grecia Mendoza; María Argueta	Women's team						

== Athletics ==
El Salvador qualified two athletes (one per gender).

Men

- Pablo Ibáñez

Women

- Nancy Sandoval

== Badminton ==
El Salvador qualified a team of six athletes (three men and three women).

Men

Athlete	Event	First round	Second round	Quarterfinals	Semifinals	Final	Rank
Athlete	Event	Opposition Result	Opposition Result	Opposition Result	Opposition Result	Opposition Result	Rank
Uriel Canjura	Singles	Job Castillo (MEX)					
Manuel Mejía	Singles	Yonatan Linarez (DOM)					
Javier Alas	Singles	Nicolas Oliva (ARG)					
Javier Alas; Manuel Mejía	Men's doubles	Vinson Chiu (USA); Joshua Yuan (USA)	—				

Women

Athlete	Event	First round	Second round	Quarterfinals	Semifinals	Final	Rank
Athlete	Event	Opposition Result	Opposition Result	Opposition Result	Opposition Result	Opposition Result	Rank
Daniela Hernández	Singles	Bye	Chequeda De Boulet (TRI)				
Fátima Centeno	Singles	Bye	Haramara Gaitan (MEX)				
Gabriela Barrios	Singles	Ailen Oliva (ARG)					
Fátima Centeno; Daniela Hernández	Women's doubles	Ines Castillo Salazar (PER); Paula La Torre Regal (PER)	—				

Mixed

Athlete	Event	First round	Second round	Quarterfinals	Semifinals	Final	Rank
Athlete	Event	Opposition Result	Opposition Result	Opposition Result	Opposition Result	Opposition Result	Rank
Manuel Mejia; Gabriela Barrios	Mixed doubles	Henry Huebla Leon (ECU); Maria Delia Zambrano (ECU)					
Javier Armando Alas; Fátima Centeno	Mixed doubles	Jose Guevara (PER); Ines Castillo Salazar (PER)					

== Basketball ==
3x3

Summary

Team	Event	Preliminary round						Semifinal	Final / BM / Pl.	
Team	Event	Opposition Result	Opposition Result	Opposition Result	Opposition Result	Opposition Result	Rank	Opposition Result	Opposition Result	Rank
El Salvador men	Men's tournament									
El Salvador women	Women's tournament									

=== Men's tournament ===
El Salvador qualified a men's team (of 4 athletes) by finishing as one of the six best non qualified teams in the FIBA 3x3 Rankings.

Roster

- Emilio Abullarade
- Kevin Campos
- Pablo Figueroa
- William Merino

=== Women's tournament ===
El Salvador qualified a women's team (of 4 athletes) by finishing as one of the six best non qualified teams in the FIBA 3x3 Rankings.

Roster

- Adriana Rivas
- Camila Lima
- Laura Rivas
- Paola Campos

== Bowling ==
El Salvador qualified a team of two women through the 2023 Central American and Caribbean Games in San Salvador, El Salvador.

Athlete	Event	Qualification / Final																Round robin											Semifinal	Final / BM	
Athlete	Event	Block 1							Block 2							Total	Rank	Round robin											Semifinal	Final / BM	
Athlete	Event	1	2	3	4	5	6	Total	7	8	9	10	11	12	Total	Total	Rank	1	2	3	4	5	6	7	8	Total	Grand total	Rank	Opposition Result	Opposition Result	Rank
Eugenia Quintanilla	Women's singles																														
Roxana Fajardo	Women's singles																														
Eugenia Quintanilla; Roxana Fajardo	Women's doubles																	—													

== Boxing ==
El Salvador qualified one male boxer.

Men

Athlete	Event	Quarterfinal	Semifinal	Final	
Athlete	Event	Opposition Result	Opposition Result	Opposition Result	Rank
Samuel Contreras	–63.5 kg				

== Equestrian ==
El Salvador qualified one individual rider in Show-Jumping.

=== Show Jumping ===
Athlete	Horse	Event	Qualification								Final					
Athlete	Horse	Event	Round 1		Round 2		Round 3		Total		Round A		Round B		Total	
Athlete	Horse	Event	Faults	Rank	Faults	Rank	Faults	Rank	Faults	Rank	Faults	Rank	Faults	Rank	Faults	Rank
Juan Manuel Bolanos Barrios	Zilouet Mystic Rose	Individual														

== Gymnastics ==
=== Artistic ===
El Salvador qualified two gymnasts in artistic (one man and one woman) at the 2023 Pan American Championships.

Men

Athlete	Event	Qualification						Total	Rank
Athlete	Event	F	PH	R	V	PB	HB	Total	Rank
Pablo Velásquez	Individual all-around								

Qualification Legend: Q = Qualified to apparatus final

Women

Athlete	Event	Qualification				Total	Rank
Athlete	Event	V	UB	BB	F	Total	Rank
Alexa Grande	Individual all-around						

Qualification Legend: Q = Qualified to apparatus final

== Judo ==
El Salvador qualified two male judokas.

Men

Athlete	Event	Round of 16	Quarterfinals	Semifinals	Repechage	Final / BM	
Athlete	Event	Opposition Result	Opposition Result	Opposition Result	Opposition Result	Opposition Result	Rank
Jairo Moreno	−60 kg						
Gustavo López	−81 kg						

== Karate ==
El Salvador qualified a team of 2 karatekas (one man and one woman) at the 2023 Central American and Caribbean Championship.

Kumite

Athlete	Event	Round robin				Semifinal	Final	
Athlete	Event	Opposition Result	Opposition Result	Opposition Result	Rank	Opposition Result	Opposition Result	Rank
Jorge Merino	Men's −84 kg							
Gabriella Izaguirre	Women's −50 kg							

== Roller sports ==
El Salvador qualified two athletes (one per gender).

=== Speed ===
Athlete	Event	Preliminary		Semifinal		Final	
Athlete	Event	Time	Rank	Time	Rank	Time	Rank
Marvin Gómez	Men's 200 m time trial						
Marvin Gómez	Men's 1000 m sprint						
Ivonne Nóchez	Women's 200 m time trial						
Ivonne Nóchez	Women's 500 m + distance						
Ivonne Nóchez	Women's 1000 m sprint						

== Rowing ==
El Salvador qualified a team of 2 athletes (one per gender).

Men

Athlete	Event	Heat		Repechage		Semifinal		Final A/B	
Athlete	Event	Time	Rank	Time	Rank	Time	Rank	Time	Rank
Roberto López	Men's Single sculls								
Adriana Escobar	Women's Single sculls								

== Sailing ==
El Salvador qualified 2 boats for a total of 2 sailors.

Athlete	Event	Race													Total	
Athlete	Event	1	2	3	4	5	6	7	8	9	10	11	12	M	Points	Rank
Enrique Arathoon	Laser											—				
Darling Alfaro	Laser radial											—				

== Shooting ==
El Salvador qualified a total of nine shooters (five men and four women).

Men

- Diego Santamaría
- Israel Gutiérrez
- Jorge Muñoz
- Jorge Pimentel
- José Gutiérrez

Women

- Frida Sibrian
- Johanna Pineda
- Milena Morales
- Ana Ramírez

== Surfing ==
El Salvador qualified three surfers (one man and two women).

Artistic

Athlete	Event	Round 1	Round 2	Round 3	Round 4	Repechage 1	Repechage 2	Repechage 3	Repechage 4	Repechage 5	Final / BM	
Athlete	Event	Opposition Result	Opposition Result	Opposition Result	Opposition Result	Opposition Result	Opposition Result	Opposition Result	Opposition Result	Opposition Result	Opposition Result	Rank
Josselyn Alabí	Women's stand up paddleboard											
Amado Alvarado	Men's Longboard											
Sindy Portillo	Women's Longboard											

== Swimming ==
El Salvador qualified 11 athletes (five men and six women).

Men

- Diego Alvarado
- Elías Segovia
- Nixon Hernández
- José Campo
- Xavier Ventura

Women

- Celina Márquez
- Elisa Funes
- Fátima Portillo
- Isabella Alas
- Marina Espadoni
- Ariana Valle

== Table tennis ==
El Salvador qualified two table tennis players (one per gender) after receiving an invitation from ITTF America.

Athlete	Event	Group stage				First round	Second round	Quarterfinal	Semifinal	Final / BM	
Athlete	Event	Opposition Result	Opposition Result	Opposition Result	Rank	Opposition Result	Opposition Result	Opposition Result	Opposition Result	Opposition Result	Rank
Diego Orantes	Men's singles	—									
Gabriela Suárez	Women's singles	—									
Diego Orantes; Gabriela Suárez	Mixed doubles	—									

== Taekwondo ==
El Salvador qualified one female athlete during the Pan American Games Qualification Tournament.

Kyorugi

Women

Athlete	Event	Round of 16	Quarterfinals	Semifinals	Repechage	Final / BM	
Athlete	Event	Opposition Result	Opposition Result	Opposition Result	Opposition Result	Opposition Result	Rank
Alisson Montaño	–57 kg						

== Tennis ==
El Salvador qualified a female tennis player.

Women

Athlete	Event	Round of 64	Round of 32	Round of 16	Quarterfinal	Semifinal	Final / BM	
Athlete	Event	Opposition Result	Opposition Result	Opposition Result	Opposition Result	Opposition Result	Opposition Result	Rank
Valentina Cruz	Singles							

== Volleyball ==
Beach

El Salvador qualified a men's and women's pair for a total of four athletes.

Athlete	Event	Group stage				Round of 16	Quarterfinal	Semifinal	Final / BM	
Athlete	Event	Opposition Result	Opposition Result	Opposition Result	Rank	Opposition Result	Opposition Result	Opposition Result	Opposition Result	Rank
Armando Guatemala; Frankin Flores	Men's					Bye				
Laura Molina; Nadia Soler	Women's					Bye				

== Weightlifting ==
El Salvador qualified two weightlifters (one per gender).

Athlete	Event	Snatch		Clean & Jerk		Total	Rank
Athlete	Event	Result	Rank	Result	Rank	Total	Rank
Ramón Cruz							
Victoria Grenni							

== Wrestling ==
El Salvador qualified a female wrestler after receiving a wild card.

Key:

- VT – Victory by fall.
- PP – Decision by points – the loser with technical points.
- PO – Decision by points – the loser without technical points.
- SP – Technical superiority – the loser with technical points and a margin of victory of at least 9 (Greco-Roman) or 10 (freestyle) points.
- ST – Great superiority – the loser without technical points and a margin of victory of at least 8 (Greco-Roman) or 10 (freestyle) points.
- VA – Decision by withdrawal

Women

Athlete	Event	Quarterfinal	Semifinal	Final / BM	
Athlete	Event	Opposition Result	Opposition Result	Opposition Result	Rank
Jacqueline Hernández	57 kg				

== Demonstration Sports ==
=== E-sports ===
El Salvador qualified a male athlete.

Men

- Obed Henríquez

== See also ==
- El Salvador at the 2023 Parapan American Games
- El Salvador at the 2024 Summer Olympics
