= Roller sports at the 2023 Pan American Games =

- Roller sports pictograms
- Venues: Velodrome (artistic); Skating rink (speed skating); Urban sports esplanade (skateboarding)
- Start date: October 21, 2023
- End date: November 5, 2023
- No. of events: 14 (7 men, 7 women)
- Competitors: 96 from TBD nations

Roller sports competitions at the 2023 Pan American Games in Santiago, Chile were held at the Velodrome (artistic), Skating rink (speed skating) and Urban Sports Esplanade (skateboarding).

The artistic competitions started on November 3 and finished on the 4th. Speed skating competitions took place on the 4th and 5 November. Skateboarding made its debut at this edition of the games, with competitions on October 21 and 22.

14 medal events were contested, two in artistic, eight in speed skating and four in skateboarding. A total of 96 qualified to compete at the games.

== Qualification ==
A total of 96 roller sports athletes will qualify to compete. 18 will qualify in artistic, 44 in speed skating and 34 in skateboarding. The 2021 Junior Pan American Games and the Pan American Championships for each discipline held in 2022 were used to determine the qualifiers. For skateboarding, the 2023 Olympic World Skateboarding Ranking will be used to determine the qualifiers.

== Medal summary ==
=== Medal table ===
* Host nation (Chile)

Rank	noc	Gold	Silver	Bronze	Total
1	Colombia	7	3	4	14
2	Brazil	3	4	0	7
3	United States	2	0	3	5
4	Chile*	1	0	3	4
5	Canada	1	0	0	1
6	Ecuador	0	2	1	3
7	Mexico	0	2	0	2
8	Argentina	0	1	1	2
9	El Salvador	0	1	0	1
9	Peru	0	1	0	1
11	Puerto Rico	0	0	1	1
11	Venezuela	0	0	1	1
Totals (12 entries)		14	14	14	42

=== Medalists ===
==== Artistic skating ====
Event	Gold	Silver	Bronze
Men's free skating	Erik Medziukevicius; Brazil	Franco Mastroianni; Argentina	Deivi Rojas; Colombia
Women's free skating	Sandra García; Colombia	Bianca Ameixeiro; Brazil	Martina Della Chiesa; Argentina

==== Speed skating ====
Event	Gold	Silver	Bronze
Men's 200 metres time-trial	Emanuelle Silva; Chile	Jorge Martínez; Mexico	Andrés Jiménez; Colombia
Men's 500 metres + distance	Andrés Jiménez; Colombia	Carlos Monsivais; Mexico	Emanuelle Silva; Chile
Men's 1,000 metres sprint	Juan Mantilla; Colombia	Andrés Jiménez; Colombia	Hugo Ramírez; Chile
Men's 10,000 metres elimination	Andrés Gómez; Colombia	Juan Mantilla; Colombia	Hugo Ramírez; Chile
Women's 200 metres time-trial	Geiny Pájaro; Colombia	Ivonne Nóchez; El Salvador	Erin Jackson; United States
Women's 500 metres	Erin Jackson; United States	María Arias; Ecuador	Geiny Pájaro; Colombia
Women's 1,000 metres sprint	Gabriela Rueda; Colombia	Gabriela Vargas; Ecuador	Angy Quintero; Venezuela
Women's 10,000 metres elimination	Fabriana Arias; Colombia	Gabriela Rueda; Colombia	Gabriela Vargas; Ecuador

==== Skateboarding ====
Event	Gold	Silver	Bronze
Men's park	Taylor Nye; United States	Augusto Akio; Brazil	Steven Piñeiro; Puerto Rico
Men's street	Lucas Rabelo; Brazil	Ángelo Caro; Peru	Jhancarlos González; Colombia
Women's park	Fay De Fazio Ebert; Canada	Raicca Ventura; Brazil	Bryce Wettstein; United States
Women's street	Rayssa Leal; Brazil	Pâmela Rosa; Brazil	Paige Heyn; United States

== See also ==
- Skateboarding at the 2024 Summer Olympics
