= Shooting at the 2023 Pan American Games – Mixed pairs air pistol =

Mixed pairs air pistol at the 2023 Pan American Games
- Venue: Polígono de tiro de Pudahuel
- Dates: October 27
- Competitors: 46 from 15 nations

Medalists
Gold medal	Andrea Ibarra; Carlos González	Mexico
Silver medal	Alejandra Zavala; Daniel Urquiza	Mexico
Bronze medal	Lisa Emmert; Nick Mowrer	United States

The mixed pairs air pistol competition of the shooting events at the 2023 Pan American Games was held on October 27 at Polígono de tiro de Pudahuel in Santiago, Chile.

== Schedule ==
Date	Time	Round
October 27, 2023	09:00	Qualification - Precision
October 27, 2023	11:00	Qualification - Rapid
October 27, 2023	13:00	Final

== Results ==
=== Qualification round ===
The first and second place advance to the gold medal match while the third and fourth place advance to the bronze medal match.

Rank	Athletes	Country	1	2	3	Total	Notes
1	Andrea Ibarra; Carlos González	Mexico	191; 98; 93	192; 95; 97	192; 94; 98	575-22x	GM, PR
2	Alejandra Zavala; Daniel Urquiza	Mexico	191; 97; 94	189; 92; 97	191; 95; 96	571-14x	GM
3	Lisa Emmert; Nickolaus Mowrer	United States	190; 94; 96	192; 95; 97	189; 95; 94	571-11X	BM
4	Cibele Breide; Felipe Wu	Brazil	189; 92; 97	190; 93; 97	190; 91; 99	569-13X	BM
5	Laura Ramos; Juan Manuel Fragueiro	Argentina	192; 98; 94	189; 93; 96	186; 92; 94	567-20X	
6	Yanka Vasileva; Tugrul Ozer	Canada	187; 91; 96	190; 93; 97	189; 95; 94	566-14x	
7	Alexis Lagan; James Hall	United States	191; 95; 96	186; 92; 94	189; 96; 93	566-14x	
8	Laina Pérez; Jorge Grau Potrillé	Cuba	187; 94; 93	190; 95; 95	187; 95; 92	564-16x	
9	Kimberly Linares; Albino Jiménez	Independent Athletes Team	190; 92; 98	191; 97; 94	183; 91; 92	564-14x	
10	Juana Rueda; Juan Sebastián Rivera	Colombia	188; 93; 95	186; 95; 91	189; 93; 96	563-12x	
11	Diana Durango; Fernando Pozo	Ecuador	184; 92; 92	185; 94; 91	191; 95; 96	560-10x	
12	Jennifer Valentín; Luis Ramón López	Puerto Rico	187; 91; 96	185; 92; 93	187; 94; 93	559-10x	
13	Annia Becerra; Marko Carrillo	Peru	190; 93; 97	186; 91; 95	183; 90; 93	559-9x	
14	Maribel Pineda; Douglas Gómez	Venezuela	187; 01; 96	186; 90; 96	185; 91; 94	558-16x	
15	Andrea Pérez; Yautung Cueva	Ecuador	187; 92; 95	188; 95; 93	183; 89; 94	558-9x	
16	Stefany Figueroa; José Castillo	Independent Athletes Team	177; 83; 94	189; 92; 97	190; 94; 96	556-14x	
17	Sheyla González; Alejandro Delgado	Cuba	186; 92; 94	181; 90; 91	189; 93; 96	556-11x	
18	Yasna Valenzuela; Ignacio Díaz	Chile	188; 94; 94	183; 92; 91	183; 90; 93	554-12x	
19	Abigail Granell; Javier Medina	Puerto Rico	184; 96; 88	186; 94; 92	184; 93; 91	554-9x	
20	Milena Morales; Jorge Pimentel	El Salvador	185; 90; 95	186; 91; 95	183; 91; 92	554-6x	
21	Tessonna Alleyne; Dave Seale	Barbados	182; 89; 93	184; 92; 92	187; 92; 95	553-13x	
22	Jocelyn Nuñez; Diego Parra	Chile	181; 91; 90	186; 94; 92	180; 90; 90	547-10x	
23	Frida Aguilar; José Luis Gutiérrez	El Salvador	169; 78; 91	178; 84; 94	176; 84; 92	523-5x	

=== Final ===
The results were as follows:

=== Bronze medal match ===
Rank	Athletes	Country	Total	Notes
3rd place, bronze medalist(s)	Lisa Emmert; Nickolaus Mowrer	United States	16	
4	Cibele Breide; Felipe Wu	Brazil	0	

=== Gold medal match ===
Rank	Athletes	Country	Total	Notes
1st place, gold medalist(s)	Andrea Ibarra; Carlos González	Mexico	16	
2nd place, silver medalist(s)	Alejandra Zavala; Daniel Urquiza	Mexico	8	
