= Shooting at the 2011 Pan American Games – Women's 25 metre pistol =

Shooting – Women's 25 metre pistol at the 2011 Pan American Games
- Venue: Pan American Shooting Polygon
- Dates: October 19
- Competitors: 25 from 14 nations

Medalists
Gold medal	Ana Luiza Mello	Brazil
Silver medal	Sandra Uptagrafft	United States
Bronze medal	Maribel Pineda	Venezuela

The men's 25 metre pistol shooting event at the 2011 Pan American Games was held on October 19 at the Pan American Shooting Polygon in Guadalajara. The defending Pan American Games champion is Sandra Uptagrafft of the United States.

The event consisted of two rounds: a qualifier and a final. In the qualifier, each shooter fired 60 shots with a pistol at 25 metres distance. Scores for each shot were in increments of 1, with a maximum score of 10. The first 30 shots were in the precision stage, with a series of 5 shots being shot within 5 minutes. The second set of 30 shots gave shooters 3 seconds to take each shot.

The top 8 shooters in the qualifying round moved on to the final round. There, they fired an additional 20 shots. These shots scored in increments of .1, with a maximum score of 10.9. They were fired in four sets of 5 rapid fire shots. The total score from all 80 shots was used to determine the final ranking.

== Schedule ==
All times are Central Standard Time (UTC−6).

Date	Time	Round
October 19, 2011	9:00	Qualification Stage 1
October 19, 2011	15:00	Final

== Records ==
The existing world and Pan American Games records were as follows.

Qualification records
World record	Diana Iorgova (BUL); Tao Luna (CHN)	594	Milan, Italy; Munich, Germany	May 31, 1994; August 23, 2002
Pan American record	Constance Petracek (USA)	585	Mar del Plata, Argentina	March 19, 1995

World record	Mariya Grozdeva (BUL)	796.7 (591+205.7)	Changwon, South Korea	April 11, 2005
Pan American record	Sandra Uptagrafft (USA)	771.9	Rio de Janeiro, Brazil	July 15, 2007

== Results ==
25 athletes from 14 countries took part.

=== Qualification round ===
Rank	Athlete	Country	8 s	6 s	4 s	8 s	6 s	4 s	Total	Notes
1	Maribel Pineda	Venezuela	99	95	97	92	92	96	571	Q
2	Teresa Meyer	United States	95	95	96	90	95	90	570	Q
3	Ana Luiza Mello	Brazil	93	96	92	95	97	95	570	Q
4	Sandra Uptagrafft	United States	93	95	98	95	92	97	570	Q
5	Editzy Pimentel	Venezuela	96	91	93	96	96	95	567	Q
6	Lea Wachowich	Canada	93	96	96	92	96	93	566	Q
7	Laina Pérez	Cuba	91	94	98	94	92	96	565	Q
8	Rosa Zuñiga	Mexico	93	96	94	93	94	95	565	Q
9	Amanda Mondol	Colombia	94	92	82	90	98	96	562	
10	Diana Durango	Ecuador	91	92	90	97	98	94	562	
11	Rachel Da Silveira	Brazil	94	93	91	98	92	93	561	
12	Mariana Nava	Mexico	93	89	92	96	95	95	561	
13	Diana Osorio	Peru	96	93	94	89	93	95	560	
14	Delmi Cruz	Guatemala	87	90	90	97	98	97	559	
15	Evelyn Rios	Cuba	92	93	94	93	89	95	556	
16	Lucia Menendez	Guatemala	90	93	95	90	93	94	555	
17	Miriam Quintanilla	Peru	91	91	90	96	89	93	550	
18	Adriana Lucia Rendon	Colombia	93	92	97	85	89	91	547	
19	Violetta Szyszkowski	Canada	94	93	90	89	90	90	546	
20	Rosario Piña	Dominican Republic	94	93	91	83	91	87	539	
21	Lilian Castro	El Salvador	89	77	93	92	90	97	538	
22	Jenny Bedoya	Ecuador	94	91	94	77	83	89	528	
23	Jeniffer Reyes	Dominican Republic	89	93	86	85	87	87	527	
24	Karen Noguerira	Virgin Islands	90	93	91	86	93	84	527	
25	Maria Lagos	Chile	88	88	86	69	76	85	492	

=== Final ===
Rank	Athlete	Qual	1	2	3	4	5	6	7	8	9	10	Final	Total	Notes
1st place, gold medalist(s)	Ana Luiza Mello (BRA)	570	9.9/10.6	10.0/10.2	10.1/9.1	10.1/10.3	9.9/10.7	10.6/10.6	9.8/9.8	10.4/10.1	10.8/10.7	10.1/10.1	203.9	773.9	FPR
2nd place, silver medalist(s)	Sandra Uptagrafft (USA)	570	10.3/10.7	10.4/10.5	10.6/9.7	10.4/9.8	10.0/9.1	8.9/10.5	9.7/10.5	10.7/10.4	9.7/9.7	9.8/8.4	199.8	769.8	
3rd place, bronze medalist(s)	Maribel Pineda (VEN)	571	10.4/10.1	9.8/9.9	10.1/10.5	9.7/10.3	10.5/10.2	9.1/10.9	9.8/10.2	10.0/9.2	10.1/9.5	8.6/8.9	197.8	768.8	
4	Editzy Pimentel (VEN)	567	10.7/9.5	10.3/9.7	8.7/10.6	9.5/10.5	10.5/8.9	10.7/9.7	9.3/10.3	10.3/10.6	10.1/10.5	10.7/10.3	201.4	768.4	
5	Teresa Meyer (USA)	570	9.9/9.6	10.4/10.5	9.0/9.2	10.3/7.8	8.7/10.9	10.3/9.8	9.9/9.1	10.7/10.0	10.3/10.0	9.9/9.3	195.6	765.6	
6	Laina Pérez (CUB)	565	10.7/8.9	10.4/10.3	9.6/10.1	10.2/9.8	10.7/10.2	10.4/9.8	10.4/10.1	10.7/10.2	10.2/8.2	8.9/9.7	199.5	764.5	
7	Lea Wachowich (CAN)	566	7.3/10.0	9.8/9.1	9.5/10.3	9.4/9.5	8.6/9.8	10.1/8.7	9.6/10.6	10.3/9.7	9.8/9.5	9.5/10.2	191.3	757.3	
8	Rosa Zuñiga (MEX)	565	10.2/7.1	9.6/10.0	9.9/10.2	10.2/10.1	10.3/9.4	7.0/8.1	9.9/8.3	10.5/10.6	10.4/10.0	9.4/10.2	191.4	756.4	
