= Shooting at the 2011 Pan American Games – Women's 10 metre air pistol =

Shooting – Women's 10 metre air pistol at the 2011 Pan American Games
- Venue: Pan American Shooting Polygon
- Dates: October 16
- Competitors: 26 from 15 nations

Medalists
Gold medal	Dorothy Ludwig	Canada
Silver medal	Maribel Pineda	Venezuela
Bronze medal	Sandra Uptagrafft	United States

The women's 10 metre air pistol shooting event at the 2011 Pan American Games was held on October 16 at the Pan American Shooting Polygon in Guadalajara. The defending Pan American Games champion was Avianna Chao of Canada, but she did not participate.

The event consisted of two rounds: a qualifier and a final. In the qualifier, each shooter fired 40 shots with an air pistol at 10 metres distance. Scores for each shot were in increments of 1, with a maximum score of 10.

The top 8 shooters in the qualifying round moved on to the final round. There, they fired an additional 10 shots. These shots scored in increments of .1, with a maximum score of 10.9. The total score from all 50 shots was used to determine final ranking.

With the win Dorothy Ludwig of Canada qualifies Canada a quota spot for the women's 10 metre air pistol event at the 2012 Summer Olympics in London, Great Britain.

== Schedule ==
All times are Central Standard Time (UTC−6).

Date	Time	Round
October 16, 2011	9:00	Qualification
October 16, 2011	14:00	Final

== Records ==
The existing world and Pan American Games records were as follows.

Qualification records
World record	Svetlana Smirnova (RUS)	393	Munich, Germany	May 23, 1998
Pan American record	Elizabeth Callahan (USA); Kim Eagles (USA)	380	Winnipeg, Canada; Rio de Janeiro, Brazil	July 29, 1999; July 17, 2007

Final records
World record	Sergei Pyzhianov (URS)	695.1 (593+102.1)	Munich, Germany	October 13, 1989
Pan American record	Kim Eagles (USA)	479.2 (380+99.9)	Winnipeg, Canada	July 29, 1999

== Results ==
=== Qualification round ===
26 athletes from 15 countries competed.

Rank	Athlete	Country	1	2	3	4	Total	Notes
1	Maribel Pineda	Venezuela	97	94	95	98	384	Q, PR
2	Dorothy Ludwig	Canada	96	92	95	97	380	Q
3	Sandra Uptagrafft	United States	95	97	97	90	379	Q
4	Adriana Lucia Rendon	Colombia	96	96	89	93	374	Q
5	Kirenia Bello	Cuba	93	96	92	92	373	Q
6	Alejandra Zavala	Mexico	93	93	94	92	372	Q
7	Jenny Bedoya	Ecuador	96	93	95	88	372	Q
8	Editzy Pimentel	Venezuela	93	92	94	93	372	Q
9	Teresa Meyer	United States	92	95	93	91	371	
10	Violetta Szyszkowski	Canada	91	91	94	95	371	
11	Mariana Nava	Mexico	93	94	91	90	368	
12	Lucia Menendez	Guatemala	92	94	90	92	368	
13	Delmi Cruz	Guatemala	87	94	92	95	368	
14	Thais Moura	Brazil	88	90	95	95	368	
15	Amanda Mondol	Colombia	95	91	92	90	368	
16	Rachel Da Silveira	Brazil	92	93	92	91	368	
17	Laina Pérez	Cuba	86	93	92	94	365	
18	Diana Osorio	Peru	91	90	93	90	364	
19	Diana Durango	Ecuador	92	87	93	91	363	
20	Jeniffer Reyes	Dominican Republic	91	90	91	91	363	
21	Lilian Castro	El Salvador	90	92	82	95	359	
22	Maria Lagos	Chile	88	90	87	93	358	
23	Karen Noguerira	Virgin Islands	90	84	90	88	352	
24	Rosario Piña	Dominican Republic	88	86	85	90	349	
25	Miriam Quintanilla	Peru	83	90	92	83	348	
26	Sandra Morales	Panama	80	77	82	75	348	

=== Final ===
Rank	Athlete	Qual	1	2	3	4	5	6	7	8	9	10	Final	Total	Notes
1st place, gold medalist(s)	Dorothy Ludwig (CAN)	380	10.1	9.5	9.4	10.1	9.7	9.6	9.8	8.8	9.4	10.4	96.8	476.8	
2nd place, silver medalist(s)	Maribel Pineda (VEN)	384	9.6	10.1	9.9	7.7	9.8	10.2	7.5	9.8	8.9	9.2	92.7	476.7	
3rd place, bronze medalist(s)	Sandra Uptagrafft (USA)	379	9.0	10.1	9.9	9.3	9.5	10.5	9.9	10.6	8.9	9.6	97.3	476.3	
4	Adriana Rendon (COL)	374	10.2	10.4	10.0	10.1	9.1	9.8	10.4	10.2	9.7	9.5	99.4	473.4	
5	Alejandra Zavala (MEX)	372	9.9	9.6	9.9	10.3	9.2	8.8	9.9	10.6	10.0	10.4	98.6	470.6	
6	Kirenia Bello (CUB)	373	10.5	9.7	10.4	9.8	9.6	9.3	9.4	9.2	9.4	9.9	97.2	470.2	
7	Jenny Bedoya (ECU)	372	10.3	8.8	9.6	10.0	9.5	9.1	8.3	10.1	9.6	10.7	96.0	468.0	
8	Editzy Pimentel (VEN)	372	9.4	9.8	9.2	8.8	10.1	9.9	8.9	7.5	10.0	8.0	91.6	463.6	
