= Ecuador at the 2023 Pan American Games =

- IOC code: ECU
- NOC: Ecuadorian National Olympic Committee

in Santiago, Chile 20 October 2023 – 5 November 2023
- Competitors: 167 in 31 sports
- Flag bearers (opening): Richard Carapaz & Angie Palacios
- Flag bearer (closing): José Acevedo
- Medals Ranked 12th: Gold 7 Silver 12 Bronze 17 Total 36

Pan American Games appearances (overview)
- 1951; 1955; 1959; 1963; 1967; 1971; 1975; 1979; 1983; 1987; 1991; 1995; 1999; 2003; 2007; 2011; 2015; 2019; 2023

Ecuador competed at the 2023 Pan American Games in Santiago, Chile from October 20 to November 5, 2023. This was Ecuador's 19th appearance at the Pan American Games, having competed at every edition of the games.

On 2 October 2023, the Ecuadorian National Olympic Committee officially named the team of 167 athletes competing in thirty one sports.

Athlete Brian Pintado and weightlifter Angie Palacios were named as the country's flagbearers during the opening ceremony. Cyclist Richard Carapaz later replaced Pintado. Meanwhile, karateka José Acevedo was the country's flagbearer during the closing ceremony.

== Medalists ==
The following Ecuadorian competitors won medals at the games. In the by discipline sections below, medalists' names are bolded.

Medal	Name	Sport	Event	Date
Gold	Angie Palacios	Weightlifting	Women's –71 kg	October 22
Gold	Julio Mendoza Loor; Jewell's Goldstrike	Equestrian	Individual dressage	October 25
Gold	Jhonatan Narváez	Cycling	Men's road race	October 29
Gold	David Hurtado	Athletics	Men's 20 kilometres walk	October 29
Gold	Lucía Yépez	Wrestling	Women's freestyle –53 kg	November 3
Gold	José Acevedo	Karate	Men's 84 kg	November 4
Gold	Glenda Morejón; Brian Pintado	Athletics	Race walk mixed team	November 4
Silver	Richard Carapaz	Cycling	Men's road time trial	October 22
Silver	Diana Durango	Shooting	Women's 25 metre pistol	October 24
Silver	Lisseth Ayoví	Weightlifting	Women's +81 kg	October 24
Silver	Sol Naranjo; Andrés Torres	Modern pentathlon	Mixed relay	October 25
Silver	José Rodríguez	Boxing	Men's –71 kg	October 27
Silver	Miryam Núñez	Cycling	Women's road race	October 29
Silver	Glenda Morejón	Athletics	Women's 20 kilometres walk	October 29
Silver	Nicole Caicedo	Athletics	Women's 400 metres	November 1
Silver	Jacqueline Mollocana	Wrestling	Women's freestyle –50 kg	November 2
Silver	Valeria Echever	Karate	Women's +68 kg	November 3
Silver	Gabriela Vargas	Roller sports	Women's 1,000 metres sprint	November 4
Silver	María Arias	Roller sports	Women's 500 metres	November 5
Bronze	Andrea Rojas	Sport climbing	Women's speed	October 21
Bronze	Katlen Jervez; Mario Troya	Taekwondo	Mixed poomsae pairs	October 21
Bronze	Carlos Granja	Sport climbing	Men's speed	October 22
Bronze	Andrés Torres	Modern pentathlon	Men's individual	October 23
Bronze	Adrián Miranda; José Carlos Nieto; Julio César Arroyo	Taekwondo	Men's Kyorugi team	October 24
Bronze	Dixon Arroyo	Weightlifting	Men's +102 kg	October 24
Bronze	Julio Castillo	Boxing	Men's –92 kg	October 26
Bronze	María José Palacios	Boxing	Women's –60 kg	October 26
Bronze	Diana Durango	Shooting	Women's 10 metre air pistol	October 26
Bronze	Andrés Torres; Bayardo Naranjo	Modern pentathlon	Men's relay	October 27
Bronze	Juan Ayala	Judo	Men's –60 kg	October 28
Bronze	Celinda Corozo	Judo	Women's –70 kg	October 29
Bronze	Luisa Valverde	Wrestling	Women's freestyle –57 kg	November 2
Bronze	Jeremy Peralta	Wrestling	Men's Greco-Roman –60 kg	November 3
Bronze	Génesis Reasco	Wrestling	Women's freestyle –76 kg	November 3
Bronze	Andrés Montaño	Wrestling	Men's Greco-Roman –67 kg	November 4
Bronze	Gabriela Vargas	Roller sports	Women's 10,000 metres elimination	November 5

== Competitors ==
The following is the list of number of competitors (per gender) participating at the games per sport/discipline.

Sport	Men	Women	Total
Archery	1	2	3
Athletics	9	9	18
Badminton	1	1	2
Bowling	2	0	2
Boxing	6	4	10
Breaking	0	2	2
Canoeing	0	4	4
Cycling	5	3	8
Equestrian	5	4	9
Fencing	0	1	1
Golf	0	2	2
Gymnastics	2	2	4
Judo	5	6	11
Karate	2	2	4
Modern pentathlon	3	3	6
Racquetball	2	2	4
Roller sports	2	2	4
Rowing	1	1	2
Sailing	2	2	4
Shooting	6	3	9
Sport climbing	3	3	6
Squash	0	3	3
Surfing	0	2	2
Swimming	3	3	6
Table tennis	3	2	5
Taekwondo	4	4	8
Tennis	0	3	3
Triathlon	3	3	6
Volleyball	2	2	4
Weightlifting	4	4	8
Wrestling	2	5	7
Total	78	89	167

== Archery ==
Ecuador qualified one archer during the 2022 Pan American Archery Championships. Ecuador also qualified two archers during the 2023 Copa Merengue.

Men

Athlete	Event	Ranking Round		Round of 32	Round of 16	Quarterfinals	Semifinals	Final / BM	Rank
Athlete	Event	Score	Seed	Opposition Score	Opposition Score	Opposition Score	Opposition Score	Opposition Score	Rank
Lester Ortegón	Individual recurve	597	32	D'Almeida (BRA) L 0–6	Did not advance				

Women

Athlete	Event	Ranking Round		Round of 32	Round of 16	Quarterfinals	Semifinals	Final / BM	Rank
Athlete	Event	Score	Seed	Opposition Score	Opposition Score	Opposition Score	Opposition Score	Opposition Score	Rank
Adriana Espinosa	Individual recurve	604	19	Barrett (CAN) L 5–6	Did not advance				
Blanca Rodrigo	Individual compound	671	14	—N/a	Usquiano (COL) L 138–143	Did not advance			

Mixed

Athlete	Event	Ranking Round		Round of 32	Round of 16	Quarterfinals	Semifinals	Final / BM	Rank
Athlete	Event	Score	Seed	Opposition Score	Opposition Score	Opposition Score	Opposition Score	Opposition Score	Rank
Lester Ortegón; Adriana Espinosa	Team recurve	1201	13	—N/a	J. Enríquez / Rendón (COL) L 2–6	Did not advance			

== Athletics ==
Ecuador qualified 18 athletes for the games.

Men

Track & road events

Athlete	Event	Semifinal		Final	
Athlete	Event	Time	Rank	Time	Rank
Anderson Marquínez	200 m	DQ		Did not advance	
Marcos Herrera	110 m hurdles	—N/a		14.29	7
Brian Pintado	20 km walk	—N/a		DNF	
David Hurtado	20 km walk	—N/a		1:19:20	1st place, gold medalist(s)
Francisco Tejeda; Anderson Marquínez; Lenin Sánchez; Alan Minda	Men's 4 × 400 metres relay	—N/a		3:09.33	6

Field events

Athlete	Event	Result	Rank
Dyander Pacho	Pole vault	NH	
Austin Ramos	Pole vault	5.20	8
Frixon Chila	Triple jump	15.42	8
Juan José Caicedo	Discus throw	DNS	

Combined events – Decathlon

Athlete	Event	100 m	LJ	SP	HJ	400 m	110H	DT	PV	JT	1500 m	Total	Rank
Andy Preciado	Result	11.28	6.73	15.89	2.01	55.21	DNS	—	—	—	—	DNF	
Andy Preciado	Points	799	750	844	813	590	0	—	—	—	—	DNF	

Women

Track & road events

Athlete	Event	Semifinal		Final	
Athlete	Event	Time	Rank	Time	Rank
Aimara Nazareno	100 m	11.73	4	Did not advance	
Aimara Nazareno	200 m	23.90	4 Q	DQ	
Anahí Suárez	100 m	11.70	4	Did not advance	
Anahí Suárez	200 m	23.63	2 Q	23.67	4
Nicole Caicedo	400 m	52.32	3 Q	51.76	2nd place, silver medalist(s)
Virginia Villalba	400 metres hurdles	1:00.28	4 q	58.99	6
Rosa Chacha	Marathon	—N/a		2:31:01	5
Glenda Morejón	20 km walk	—N/a		Void	2nd place, silver medalist(s)
Paula Torres Sarango	20 km walk	—N/a		Void	7
Magaly Bonilla	20 km walk	—N/a		Void	6
Evelin Mercado; Nicole Caicedo; Aimara Nazareno; Nicol Chala; Anahí Suárez	4 × 100 m relay	44.34	1 Q	44.64	4
Virginia Villalba; Anahí Suárez; Evelin Mercado; Nicole Caicedo	4 × 400 m relay	—N/a		3:35.76	4

Field events

Athlete	Event	Result	Rank
Yuliana Angulo	Long jump	6.24	4
Nereida Santacruz	Hammer throw	57.69	10

Mixed

Track & road events

Athlete	Event	Result	Rank
Francisco Tejeda; Virginia Villalba; Alan Minda; Nicole Caicedo	4 × 400 metres relay	3:23.09	5
Brian Pintado; Glenda Morejón	Race walk mixed team	2:56:49	1st place, gold medalist(s)

== Badminton ==
Ecuador qualified a team of two athletes (one man and one woman).

Men

Athlete	Event	First round	Second round	Quarterfinals	Semifinals	Final	
Athlete	Event	Opposition Result	Opposition Result	Opposition Result	Opposition Result	Opposition Result	Rank
Henry Huebla	Singles	Cavallotti (CRC) W (21–12, 21–17)	Shu (USA) L (21–23, 8–21)	Did not advance			

Women

Athlete	Event	First round	Second round	Third round	Quarterfinals	Semifinals	Final	
Athlete	Event	Opposition Result	Opposition Result	Opposition Result	Opposition Result	Opposition Result	Opposition Result	Rank
María Zambrano	Singles	Bye	Lima (BRA) L (18–21, 19–21)	Did not advance				

Mixed

Athlete	Event	First round	Second round	Quarterfinals	Semifinals	Final	
Athlete	Event	Opposition Result	Opposition Result	Opposition Result	Opposition Result	Opposition Result	Rank
Henry Huebla; María Zambrano	Doubles	Mejía / G. Barrios (ESA) W (21–8, 21–14)	Mariñez / Acosta (DOM) W (21–15, 21–8)	Chiu / Gai (USA) L (8–21, 8–21)	Did not advance		

== Beach Volleyball ==
Ecuador qualified a men's and women's pair for a total of four athletes.

Athlete	Event	Group stage				Round of 16	Quarterfinals	Semifinals	Final / BM	
Athlete	Event	Opposition Result	Opposition Result	Opposition Result	Rank	Opposition Result	Opposition Result	Opposition Result	Opposition Result	Rank
Dany León; Marcos Tenorio	Men's	MacNeil / Russell (CAN) W 2–0 (21–18, 22–20)	T. Capogrosso / N. Capogrosso (ARG) L 0–2 (17–21, 13–21)	Varela / Dyner (CRC) W 2–0 (21–19, 21–14)	2 q	Calvo / Salvatierra (BOL) W 2–0 (23–21, 21–10)	Alayo / Díaz (CUB) L 0–2 (16–21, 19–21)	5th–8th semifinals Sarabia / Virgen (MEX) L 1–2 (14–21, 21–16, 14–16)	7th place match T. Capogrosso / N. Capogrosso (ARG) W 2–INJ (21–0, 21–0)	7
Karelys Simisterra; Ariana Vilela	Women's	Gutiérrez / Flores (MEX) L 0–2 (19–21, 17–21)	Vorpahl / Rivas (CHI) L 1–2 (17–21, 21–16, 16–18)	Araya / Williams (CRC) W 2–0 (21–15, 21–18)	3 q	González / Navas (PUR) L 0–2 (17–21, 14–21)	Did not advance	9th–12th semifinals Almánzar / Payano (DOM) L 0–2 (17–21, 14–21)	11th place match Mongelós / Valiente (PAR) L 0–2 (17–21, 20–22)	12

== Bowling ==
Ecuador qualified a team of two men through the 2022 South American Games held in Asunción, Paraguay.

Men

Athlete	Event	Qualification / Final																		Semifinal	Final / BM	
Athlete	Event	1	2	3	4	5	6	7	8	9	10	11	12	13	14	15	16	Total	Rank	Opposition Result	Opposition Result	Rank
Raúl Ayala	Singles	234	189	171	197	180	203	188	190	245	219	178	274	184	204	183	168	3207	16	Did not advance		
Gustavo Wong	Singles	194	196	214	266	197	152	182	166	258	181	265	168	183	237	203	134	3196	19	Did not advance		
Raúl Ayala; Gustavo Wong	Doubles	191; 188	168; 257	215; 200	213; 201	199; 149	213; 197	174; 191	177; 215	—N/a								3148	10	—N/a		

== Boxing ==
Ecuador qualified ten boxers (six men and four women).

Men

Athlete	Event	Round of 32	Round of 16	Quarterfinals	Semifinals	Final	Rank
Athlete	Event	Opposition Result	Opposition Result	Opposition Result	Opposition Result	Opposition Result	Rank
Luis Fernando Delgado	–51 kg	—N/a	Bye	Quiroga (ARG) L 1-4	Did not advance		
Jean Caicedo	–57 kg	—N/a	Bye	de los Santos (DOM) L 0-5	Did not advance		
José Gabriel Rodríguez	–71 kg	—N/a	de Oliveira (BRA) W 4-1	Mafauad (ARG) W 5-0	Petanqui (CAN) W 4-0	Verde (MEX) L 0-5	2nd place, silver medalist(s)
Gustiniano Mina	–80 kg	—N/a	López (CUB) L 0-5	Did not advance			
Julio Castillo	–92 kg	—N/a	Bye	Romero (MEX) W 5-0	La Cruz (CUB) L 1-4	Did not advance	3rd place, bronze medalist(s)
Gerlon Congo	+92 kg	—N/a	Véliz (CHI) W 3-2	Edwards (USA) L 0-5	Did not advance		

Women

Athlete	Event	Round of 32	Round of 16	Quarterfinals	Semifinals	Final	Rank
Athlete	Event	Opposition Result	Opposition Result	Opposition Result	Opposition Result	Opposition Result	Rank
Susan Águas	–50 kg	—N/a	Lozano (USA) L 2-3	Did not advance			
Helen Sánchez	–54 kg	—N/a	Bye	Chagas (BRA) L 0-5	Did not advance		
María José Palacios	–60 kg	—N/a	Bye	Saputo (ARG) W 5-0	Valdés (COL) L 1-4	Did not advance	3rd place, bronze medalist(s)
Ingrith Maldonado	75 kg	—N/a	Bye	Bylon (PAN) L 0-5	Did not advance		

== Breaking ==
Ecuador qualified two female breakdancers through the WDSF World Rankings.

Women

Athlete	Nickname	Event	Round Robin				Quarterfinals	Semifinals	Final / BM	
Athlete	Nickname	Event	Opposition Result	Opposition Result	Opposition Result	Rank	Opposition Result	Opposition Result	Opposition Result	Rank
Isis Granda	Isis	B-Girls	Luma (COL) L 0–2	Vale Chica (CHI) W 2–0	Xunli (MEX) W 2–0	2 Q	Tiff (CAN) L 1–2	Did not advance		
Karla Muñoz	Lakshmi Hop	B-Girls	Tiara (PER) W 2–0	Emma (CAN) L 0–2	Tiff (CAN) L 0–2	3	Did not advance			

== Canoeing ==
=== Sprint ===
Ecuador qualified a total of three female sprint athletes.

Women

Athlete	Event	Heat		Semifinal		Final	
Athlete	Event	Time	Rank	Time	Rank	Time	Rank
Anggie Avegno	C-1	51.11	3 SF	51.34	1 FA	49.21	6
Anggie Avegno; Neida Angulo	C-2	—N/a				2:04.00	6
Stefanie Perdomo	K-1	2:03.95	4 SFB	2:04.39	3 FB	2:01.68	9

=== Slalom ===
Ecuador qualified a female slalom athlete.

Women

Athlete	Event	Heats			Semifinal		Final	
Athlete	Event	Run 1	Run 2	Rank	Time	Rank	Time	Rank
Emilie Armani	K-1	100.80	~~105.57~~	6 Q	135.72	5 Q	145.23	5

Kayak cross
Women

Athlete	Event	Time trial		Repechage	Semifinal	Final
Athlete	Event	Time	Rank	Rank	Rank	Rank
Emilie Armani	Kayak cross	64.56	12 Q	Bye	4	Did not advance

- Only one per country could advance to the next round.

== Cycling ==
Ecuador qualified a total of eight cyclists (five men and three women).

=== BMX ===
Ecuador qualified four cyclists (two men and two women) in BMX race through the UCI World Rankings.

Racing

Athlete	Event	Ranking round		Quarterfinal		Semifinal		Final	
Athlete	Event	Time	Rank	Points	Rank	Points	Rank	Time	Rank
Wilson Goyes	Men's	32.950	7	8	=2 Q	12	5	Did not advance	
Cristhian Castro	Men's	33.220	13	12	4 Q	18	6	Did not advance	
Doménica Azuero	Women's	37.150	7	9	3 Q	13	4 Q	41.300	6
Doménica Mora	Women's	37.480	9	9	3 Q	15	=5	Did not advance	

=== Road ===
Ecuador qualified four cyclists (three men and one woman).

Men

Athlete	Event	Time	Rank
Jhonatan Narváez	Road race	3:37.56	1st place, gold medalist(s)
Richard Carapaz	Road race	3:38.02	7
Richard Carapaz	Time trial	47:36.02	2nd place, silver medalist(s)
Leonidas Novoa	Road race	DNF	

Women

Athlete	Event	Time	Rank
Miryam Núñez	Road race	2:52.29	2nd place, silver medalist(s)
Miryam Núñez	Time trial	28:36.38	16

=== Track ===
Omnium

Athlete	Event	Scratch race		Tempo race		Elimination race		Points race		Total	
Athlete	Event	Points	Rank	Points	Rank	Points	Rank	Points	Rank	Points	Rank
Leonidas Novoa	Men's	22	10	28	7	30	6	1	-	DNF	

== Equestrian ==
Ecuador qualified a team of 9 equestrians (three in Dressage, two in Eventing and four in Jumping).

=== Dressage ===
Athlete	Horse	Event	Qualification						Grand Prix Freestyle / Intermediate I Freestyle	
Athlete	Horse	Event	Grand Prix / Prix St. Georges		Grand Prix Special / Intermediate I		Total		Grand Prix Freestyle / Intermediate I Freestyle	
Athlete	Horse	Event	Score	Rank	Score	Rank	Score	Rank	Score	Rank
Julio Mendoza	Jewel's Goldstrike	Individual								
Carolina Espinosa	Findus K	Individual								
María José Granja		Individual								
Julio Mendoza; Carolina Espinosa; María José Granja	See above	Team							—N/a	

=== Eventing ===
Athlete	Horse	Event	Dressage		Cross-country		Jumping		Total	
Athlete	Horse	Event	Points	Rank	Points	Rank	Points	Rank	Points	Rank
Nicolas Wettstein		Individual								
Diego Zurita		Individual								

=== Jumping ===
Athlete	Horse	Event	Qualification								Final					
Athlete	Horse	Event	Round 1		Round 2		Round 3		Total		Round A		Round B		Total	
Athlete	Horse	Event	Faults	Rank	Faults	Rank	Faults	Rank	Faults	Rank	Faults	Rank	Faults	Rank	Faults	Rank
Ana Carolina Sandoval		Individual														
Anna Christina Gansauer		Individual														
Gonzalo Mesa		Individual														
Juan Sebastián González		Individual														
Ana Carolina Sandoval; Anna Christina Gansauer; Gonzalo Mesa; Juan Sebastián González	See above	Team									—N/a					

== Fencing ==
Ecuador qualified one female fencer through the 2022 Pan American Fencing Championships in Ascuncion, Paraguay. This will mark the country's Pan American Games debut in the sport.

Women

Athlete	Event	Pool Round		Round of 16	Quarterfinals	Semifinal	Final	
Athlete	Event	Victories	Seed	Opposition Score	Opposition Score	Opposition Score	Opposition Score	Rank
Camila Ortiz	Foil	0 V – 5 D	18	Did not advance				

== Golf ==
Ecuador qualified a team of two female golfers.

Women

Athlete	Event	Round 1	Round 2	Round 3	Round 4	Total		
Athlete	Event	Score	Score	Score	Score	Score	Par	Rank
Anika Veintemilla	Individual	78	76	79	80	313	+25	25
Emma Baier	Individual	79	78	85	79	321	+33	29

== Gymnastics ==
=== Artistic ===
Ecuador qualified four gymnasts in artistic (two men and two women) at the 2023 Pan American Championships.

Men

Athlete	Event	Qualification						Total	Rank
Athlete	Event	F	PH	R	V	PB	HB	Total	Rank
Cesar López	Individual all-around								
Johnny Valencia	Individual all-around								

Qualification Legend: Q = Qualified to apparatus final

Women

Athlete	Event	Qualification				Total	Rank
Athlete	Event	V	UB	BB	F	Total	Rank
Alais Perea	Individual all-around						
Ashley Bohorquez	Individual all-around						

Qualification Legend: Q = Qualified to apparatus final

== Judo ==
Ecuador has qualified 11 judokas (five men and six women).

Men

Athlete	Event	Round of 16	Quarterfinals	Semifinals	Repechage	Final / BM	
Athlete	Event	Opposition Result	Opposition Result	Opposition Result	Opposition Result	Opposition Result	Rank
Bryan Garboa	−60 kg	Bye	Fernández (CHI) L 00–10	Did not advance	Juárez (MEX) L 00–10	Did not advance	
Juan Ayala	−60 kg	Terao (USA) W 10–00	Sancho (CRC) L 00–01	Did not advance	Moreno (ESA) W 10–00	Fernández (CHI) W 10–00	3rd place, bronze medalist(s)
Lenin Preciado	−66 kg	Bye	Frascadore (CAN) L 00–10	Did not advance	Ramírez (DOM) W 10–00	Polanco (CUB) L 00–01	=5
Júnior Angulo	−100 kg	Bye	Briceño (CHI) L 00–11	Did not advance	Balanta (COL) L 00–10	Did not advance	
Freddy Figueroa	+100 kg	Bye	Deschenes (CAN) L 00–10	Did not advance	Cruz (CUB) W 11–00	Nova (DOM) L 00–10	=5

Women

Athlete	Event	Round of 16	Quarterfinals	Semifinals	Repechage	Final / BM	
Athlete	Event	Opposition Result	Opposition Result	Opposition Result	Opposition Result	Opposition Result	Rank
Luz Peña	−48 kg	Bye	Lima (BRA) L 00–10	Did not advance	Laborde (USA) L 00–11	Did not advance	
Aracelly Barrionuevo	−52 kg	González (CHI) L 00–10	Did not advance				
Astrid Gavidia	−57 kg	Flores (PER) W 10–00	Villalba (COL) L 00–10	Did not advance	Jiménez (PAN) L 00–01	Did not advance	
Edith Ortiz	−63 kg	Mera (COL) L 00–10	Did not advance				
Celinda Corozo	−70 kg	Bye	Carvalho (BRA) W 10–01	Gómez (CUB) L 01–10	Bye	Castilhos (BRA) W 10–00	3rd place, bronze medalist(s)
Vanessa Chalá	−78 kg	Bye	Venegas (CHI) W 10–00	Soares (BRA) L 01–10	Bye	Figueroa (PER) L 00–01	=5

== Karate ==
Ecuador qualified a team of four karatekas (two men and two women) at the 2022 South American Games and the 2023 Pan American Championships.

Kumite
Men

Athlete	Event	Round robin					Semifinals	Final	
Athlete	Event	Opposition Result	Opposition Result	Opposition Result	Opposition Result	Rank	Opposition Result	Opposition Result	Rank
Fred Proaño	−67 kg	Ramírez (COL) L 1–3	Navarro (ARG) W 3–2	Velozo (CHI) L 0–5	Gálvez (PAN) 0–0	4	Did not advance		
José Acevedo	−84 kg	Henao (COL) L 1–8	Servin (PAR) W 9–2	Benavides (MEX) W 7–4	—N/a	2 Q	Merino (ESA) W 5–1	Henao (COL) W 3–2	1st place, gold medalist(s)

Women

Athlete	Event	Round robin					Semifinals	Final	
Athlete	Event	Opposition Result	Opposition Result	Opposition Result	Opposition Result	Rank	Opposition Result	Opposition Result	Rank
Valeria Echever	+68 kg	Quintal (MEX) W 5–4	Nolet (CAN) L 3–8	Madani (USA) W 6–3	—N/a	1 Q	Rodríguez (DOM) W 11–6	Quintal (MEX) L 1–2	2nd place, silver medalist(s)

Kata
Women

Athlete	Event	Round robin				Final / BM	
Athlete	Event	Opposition Result	Opposition Result	Opposition Result	Rank	Opposition Result	Rank
Cristina Orbe	Women's individual	Laos-Loo (CAN) L 38.30–39.60	Armada (VEN) W 38.90–38.00	Zapata (COL) L 38.10–39.90	4	Did not advance	

== Modern pentathlon ==
Ecuador qualified six modern pentathletes (three men and three women).

Men

Athlete	Event	Fencing ranking round (Épée one touch)			Semifinal									Final												
Athlete	Event	Fencing ranking round (Épée one touch)			Fencing	Swimming (200 m freestyle)			Shooting / Running (10 m laser pistol / 3000 m cross-country)			Total		Fencing	Swimming			Riding (Show jumping)				Shooting / Running			Total	
Athlete	Event	V – D	Rank	MP points	BP	Time	Rank	MP points	Time	Rank	MP points	MP points	Rank	BP	Time	Rank	MP points	Time	Faults	Rank	MP points	Time	Rank	MP points	MP points	Rank
Andrés Torres	Individual	19-11	6 QB	238	2	2:10.66	5	289	11:22.60	7	618	1147	=1 Q	0	2:07.06	3	296	0:56.03	0	1	300	10:47.50	11	653	1487	3rd place, bronze medalist(s)
Bayardo Naranjo	Individual	15-15	15 QA	214	0	2:13.05	6	284	11:41.40	12	599	1097	11	Did not advance												
Isaac Hernández	Individual	7-23	31 QB	166	0	2:19.83	11	271	10:33.30	1	645	1082	13	Did not advance												
Bayardo Naranjo; Andrés Torres	Relay	17-19	7	206	—N/a									8	1:54.47	4	322	1:57.00	21	2	279	12:07.80	6	573	1396	3rd place, bronze medalist(s)

Women

Athlete	Event	Fencing ranking round (Épée one touch)			Semifinal									Final												
Athlete	Event	Fencing ranking round (Épée one touch)			Fencing	Swimming (200 m freestyle)			Shooting / Running (10 m laser pistol / 3000 m cross-country)			Total		Fencing	Swimming			Riding (Show jumping)				Shooting / Running			Total	
Athlete	Event	V – D	Rank	MP points	BP	Time	Rank	MP points	Time	Rank	MP points	MP points	Rank	BP	Time	Rank	MP points	Time	Faults	Rank	MP points	Time	Rank	MP points	MP points	Rank
Sol Naranjo	Individual	21-11	3 QA	244	0	2:51.79	15	207	12:19.10	7	561	1012	8 Q	0	2:51.68	17	207	1:01.08	8	6	292	12:10.50	11	570	1313	10
Dara Salazar Almeida	Individual	20-12	8 QB	238	2	2:31.27	7	248	13:37.50	11	483	971	11	Did not advance												
Marcela Cuaspud	Individual	13-19	24 QA	196	8	2:38.38	11	234	13:02.40	13	518	956	12	Did not advance												
Sol Naranjo; Dara Salazar Almeida	Relay	17-19	5	210	—N/a									2	2:24.45	9	262	EL			0	14:30.30	7	430	904	8

Mixed

Athlete	Event	Fencing (Épée one touch)				Swimming (200 m freestyle)			Riding (Show jumping)				Shooting / Running (10 m laser pistol / 3000 m cross-country)			Total	
Athlete	Event	V – D	Rank	MP points	BP	Time	Rank	MP points	Time	Faults	Rank	MP points	Time	Rank	MP points	MP points	Rank
Andrés Torres; Sol Naranjo	Relay	26-18	3	230	4	2:09.71	9	291	2:12.00	12	1	288	12:58.50	4	522	1335	2nd place, silver medalist(s)

== Racquetball ==
Ecuador qualified four racquetball athletes (two men and two women).

Men

Athlete	Event	Round of 32	Round of 16	Quarterfinals	Semifinals	Final	
Athlete	Event	Opposition Result	Opposition Result	Opposition Result	Opposition Result	Opposition Result	Rank
Juan Cueva	Singles	Mansilla (CHI) W 3–0 (11-8, 11-8, 11-6)	Montoya (MEX) L 1–3 (9-11, 11-4, 5-11, 4-11)	Did not advance			
José Ugalde	Singles	Gatica (CHI) W 3–0 (11-9, 12-10, 12-10)	Portillo (MEX) L 2–3 (10-12, 12-10, 12-14, 11-9, 9-11)	Did not advance			
Juan Cueva; José Ugalde	Doubles	—N/a	Bye	G. García / Acuña (CRC) L 0–3 (9-11, 6-11, 11-13)	Did not advance		
Juan Cueva; José Ugalde	Team	—N/a	Bye	United States L 0–2 (1-3, 0-3)	Did not advance		

Women

Athlete	Event	Round of 32	Round of 16	Quarterfinals	Semifinals	Final	
Athlete	Event	Opposition Result	Opposition Result	Opposition Result	Opposition Result	Opposition Result	Rank
María José Muñoz	Singles	Delgado (DOM) L 2–3 (6-11, 11-8, 6-11, 11-1, 7-11)	Did not advance				
Verónica Sotomayor	Singles	Cespedes (DOM) W 3–0 (11-6, 11-4, 11-1)	Mejía (MEX) L 1–3 (7-11, 11-8, 10-12, 6-11)	Did not advance			
María José Muñoz; Verónica Sotomayor	Doubles	—N/a	Delgado / Cespedes (DOM) W 3–0 (11-9, 11-3, 11-8)	Barrios / Daza (BOL) L 2–3 (10-12, 11-6, 5-11, 11-8, 7-11)	Did not advance		
María José Muñoz; Verónica Sotomayor	Team	—N/a	Dominican Republic L 1–2; 1-3, 3-0, 1-3	Did not advance			

Mixed

Athlete	Event	Round of 32	Round of 16	Quarterfinals	Semifinals	Final	
Athlete	Event	Opposition Result	Opposition Result	Opposition Result	Opposition Result	Opposition Result	Rank
José Ugalde; Verónica Sotomayor	Doubles	—N/a	Bye	García / Vargas (ARG) L 0–3 (4-11, 8-11, 6-11)	Did not advance		

== Roller sports ==
=== Speed ===
Ecuador qualified four athletes (two men and two women) in speed skating.

Men

Athlete	Event	Qualification		Semifinals		Final	
Athlete	Event	Time	Rank	Time	Rank	Time	Rank
Renato Carchi	200 m time-trial	—N/a				18.348	6
Renato Carchi	500 m + distance	43.502	5 Q	45.128	3 q	45.209	6
Renato Carchi	1000 m sprint	1:25.540	10	Did not advance			
Jorge Bolaños	10,000 m elimination	—N/a				EL	4

Women

Athlete	Event	Qualification		Semifinals		Final	
Athlete	Event	Time	Rank	Time	Rank	Time	Rank
María Arias	200 m time-trial	—N/a				18.957	4
María Arias	500 m + distance	45.761	1 Q	46.676	1 Q	45.632	2nd place, silver medalist(s)
Gabriela Vargas	1000 m sprint	1:29.637	8 q	—N/a		1:28.741	2nd place, silver medalist(s)
Gabriela Vargas	10,000 m elimination	—N/a				17:47.638	3rd place, bronze medalist(s)

== Rowing ==
Ecuador qualified a team of 2 athletes (one man and one woman).

Men

Athlete	Event	Heat		Repechage		Semifinals		Final A/B/C	
Athlete	Event	Time	Rank	Time	Rank	Time	Rank	Time	Rank
Israel Salavarría	Single sculls	8:16:61	6 R	7:46:72	5 FC	Did not advance		8:00.36	16

Women

Athlete	Event	Heat		Repechage		Semifinals		Final A/B/C	
Athlete	Event	Time	Rank	Time	Rank	Time	Rank	Time	Rank
Kerly Salazar	Single sculls	9:33:26	6 R	9:01:23	4 FC	Did not advance		9:01.17	15

== Sailing ==
Ecuador qualified 2 boats for a total of 4 sailors.

Men

Athlete	Event	Opening series																		Finals		
Athlete	Event	1	2	3	4	5	6	7	8	9	10	11	12	13	14	15	16	Points	Rank	M	Points	Rank
Matías Dyck	ILCA 7	10	12	8	10	8	12	(17)	5	6	10	—N/a						98	9	Did not advance		

Mixed

Athlete	Event	Race													Total	
Athlete	Event	1	2	3	4	5	6	7	8	9	10	11	12	M	Points	Rank
Alisson Haon; Jonathan Martinetti; Moira Padilla	Lightning	4	(7)	5	4	7	4	6	6	6	7	—N/a		Did not advance		

== Shooting ==
Ecuador qualified a total of nine shooters (six men and three women) after the 2022 Americas Shooting Championships and the 2022 South American Games.

Men

Athlete	Event	Qualification		Final	
Athlete	Event	Points	Rank	Points	Rank
Fernando Pozo	10 m air pistol	569-13x	6 Q	152.9	6
Yautung Córdova	10 m air pistol	567-13x	9	Did not advance	
Yautung Córdova	25 m rapid fire pistol	553-7x	16	Did not advance	
Milton Camacho	10 m air rifle	613.8	17	Did not advance	
Jhon Hurtado	10 m air rifle	591.9	26	Did not advance	
Jhon Hurtado	50 m rifle three positions	526-7x	21	Did not advance	
Mario de Genna	Skeet	104	25	Did not advance	

Women

Athlete	Event	Qualification		Final	
Athlete	Event	Points	Rank	Points	Rank
Diana Durango	10 m air pistol	570-16x	8 Q	213.0	3rd place, bronze medalist(s)
Diana Durango	25 m pistol	573-13x	4 Q	28	2nd place, silver medalist(s)
Andrea Pérez Peña	10 m air pistol	572-11x	4 Q	193.7	4
Andrea Pérez Peña	25 m pistol	573-14x	5 Q	10	7
Ana Cruz	10 m air rifle	613.9	17	Did not advance	
Ana Cruz	50 m rifle three positions	563-19x	18	Did not advance	

Mixed

Athlete	Event	Qualification		Final / BM	
Athlete	Event	Points	Rank	Points	Rank
Fernando Pozo; Diana Durango	10 m air pistol team	560-10x	11	Did not advance	
Yautung Córdova; Andrea Pérez Peña	10 m air pistol team	558-9x	15	Did not advance	
Milton Camacho; Ana Cruz	Mixed pairs air rifle	605.9	19	Did not advance	

== Sport climbing ==
Ecuador qualified a team of 6 climbers (three men and three women) by virtue of their IFSC world rankings.

Men

Athlete	Event	Qualification			Round of 16	Quarterfinals	Semifinals	Final / BM	
Athlete	Event	Lane A	Lane B	Rank	Opposition Result	Opposition Result	Opposition Result	Opposition Result	Rank
Carlos Granja	Speed	5.59	~~5.84~~	2 Q	Tapia (CHI) W 5.74–7.85	Le (CAN) W 5.57–5.84	Bratschi (USA) L FALL–5.37	Flynn-Pitcher (CAN) W 5.52–5.59	3rd place, bronze medalist(s)
Isaac Estevez	Speed	6.13	~~8.54~~	8 Q	Ledesma (CHI) W 5.85–6.22	Watson (USA) L 5.68–5.05	Did not advance		
Gabriel Cancel	Speed	~~7.18~~	6.29	10 Q	Le (CAN) L 6.56–6.10	Did not advance			

Women

Athlete	Event	Qualification			Round of 16	Quarterfinals	Semifinals	Final / BM	
Athlete	Event	Lane A	Lane B	Rank	Opposition Result	Opposition Result	Opposition Result	Opposition Result	Rank
Andrea Rojas	Speed	8.57	~~12.77~~	5 Q	—N/a	Macias (MEX) W 7.60–8.19	Hunt (USA) L 7.74–6.71	Curcio (USA) W 7.59–FALL	3rd place, bronze medalist(s)
Abigail Ruano	Speed	~~11.45~~	9.92	10	Did not advance				
Nicole Mejia	Speed	~~10.42~~	10.14	11	Did not advance				

== Squash ==
Ecuador qualified a team of three female athletes through the 2023 Pan American Squash Championships.

Women

Athlete	Event	Round of 32	Round of 16	Quarterfinals	Semifinals	Final	
Athlete	Event	Opposition Result	Opposition Result	Opposition Result	Opposition Result	Opposition Result	Rank
María Buenaño	Singles	Prow (BAR) L 1–4	Did not advance				
María Moya	Singles	Bye	García (MEX) W 3–2	Fiechter (USA) L 0–3	Did not advance		
María Moya; María Buenaño	Doubles	—N/a		Sobhy / Fiechter (USA) L 0–2	Did not advance		
María Moya; María Buenaño; Rafaela Albuja	Team	—N/a		Canada L 0–3	Mexico L 1–2	Independent Athletes Team W 2–0	7

== Surfing ==
Ecuador qualified two female surfers.

Women

Artistic

Athlete	Event	Round 1	Round 2	Round 3	Round 4	Repechage 1	Repechage 2	Repechage 3	Repechage 4	Repechage 5	Repechage 6	Final	
Athlete	Event	Opposition Result	Opposition Result	Opposition Result	Opposition Result	Opposition Result	Opposition Result	Opposition Result	Opposition Result	Opposition Result	Opposition Result	Opposition Result	Rank
Mimi Barona	Shortboard	Rosas (PER) L 6.96–11.33	Did not advance			Pellizzari (ARG) L 1.80–6.80	Did not advance						
Xiomara Bowen	SUP surf	Adisaka (BRA); Alabi (ESA) W 7.77 Q	Cosoleto (ARG); Gómez (COL) L 5.07	Did not advance		Bye	Finer (MEX) W 5.84–4.34	Cosoleto (ARG) L 6.87–7.73	Did not advance		—N/a	Did not advance	

== Swimming ==
Ecuador qualified a total of six athletes (three men and three women).

Men

Athletes	Event	Heats		Final	
Athletes	Event	Time	Position	Time	Position
Tomas Peribonio	100 m breaststroke	1:02.21 NR	11 QB	1:02.59	14
Tomas Peribonio	200 m individual medley	2:03.32	9 QB	2:02.40	9
Esteban Enderica	10 km marathon	—N/a		1:50:39.3	6
David Farinango	10 km marathon	—N/a		1:50:40.6	7

Women

Athletes	Event	Heats		Final	
Athletes	Event	Time	Position	Time	Position
Anicka Delgado	50 m freestyle	25.65	9 QB	25.45	9
Anicka Delgado	100 m freestyle	55.73	5 QA	55.95	7
Anicka Delgado	200 m freestyle	DNS		Did not advance	
Anicka Delgado	100 m butterfly	59.79	5 QA	1:00.52	8
Jade Foelske	100 m butterfly	1:02.35	15 QB	1:02.19	15
Jade Foelske	200 m butterfly	2:18.47	11 QB	2:16.77	10
Jade Foelske	200 m individual medley	2:23.86	15 QB	2:21.92	13
Ana Abad	10 km marathon	—N/a		2:03:46.3	10

== Table tennis ==
Ecuador qualified a team of five athletes (three men and two women) through the 2023 Special Qualification Event.

Men

Athlete	Event	Group stage			Round of 32	Round of 16	Quarterfinals	Semifinals	Final / BM	
Athlete	Event	Opposition Result	Opposition Result	Rank	Opposition Result	Opposition Result	Opposition Result	Opposition Result	Opposition Result	Rank
Alberto Miño	Singles	—N/a			Toranzos (PAR) W 4–2	Gómez (CHI) L 2–4	Did not advance			
Rodrigo Tapia	Singles	—N/a			Alto (ARG) L 0–4	Did not advance				
Alberto Miño; Emiliano Riofrio	Doubles	—N/a				Gatica / Moscoso (EAI) W 4–0	Alto / Cifuentes (ARG) L 2–4	Did not advance		
Alberto Miño; Rodrigo Tapia; Emiliano Riofrio	Team	Brazil L 2–3	Paraguay W 3–2	2 Q	—N/a		Canada L 0–3	Did not advance		

Women

Athlete	Event	Group stage			Round of 32	Round of 16	Quarterfinals	Semifinals	Final / BM	
Athlete	Event	Opposition Result	Opposition Result	Rank	Opposition Result	Opposition Result	Opposition Result	Opposition Result	Opposition Result	Rank
Angélica Arellano	Singles	—N/a			Argüelles (ARG) W 4–2	B. Takahashi (BRA) L 0–4	Did not advance			
Nathaly Paredes	Singles	—N/a			Codina (ARG) L 2–4	Did not advance				
Nathaly Paredes; Angélica Arellano	Doubles	—N/a				Barcenas / Cossio (MEX) L 2–4	Did not advance			

Mixed

Athlete	Event	Round of 32	Round of 16	Quarterfinal	Semifinal	Final / BM	
Athlete	Event	Opposition Result	Opposition Result	Opposition Result	Opposition Result	Opposition Result	Rank
Alberto Miño; Nathaly Paredes	Doubles	Bye	Burgos / Vega (CHI) L 0–4	Did not advance			

== Taekwondo ==
Ecuador qualified 8 athletes (four men and four women) during the Pan American Games Qualification Tournament.

Kyorugi

Men

Athlete	Event	Round of 16	Quarterfinals	Semifinals	Repechage	Final/ BM	
Athlete	Event	Opposition Result	Opposition Result	Opposition Result	Opposition Result	Opposition Result	Rank
Adrián Miranda	–58 kg	Fuentes (EAI) W 2–0	Plaza (MEX) L 0–2	Did not advance	Bye	Melo (BRA) L 0–2	=5
José Nieto Preciado	–68 kg	T-k Park (CAN) L 0–2	Did not advance				
Julio César Arroyo	+80 kg	Pérez (CUB) W 2–0	Sansores (MEX) L 0–2	Did not advance	—N/a	Alves (ARG) L 0–2	=5
Adrián Miranda; José Nieto Preciado; Julio César Arroyo	Team	Puerto Rico W 72–32	Dominican Republic W 74–63	Brazil L 37–67	—N/a	Did not advance	3rd place, bronze medalist(s)

Women

Athlete	Event	Round of 16	Quarterfinals	Semifinals	Repechage	Final/ BM	
Athlete	Event	Opposition Result	Opposition Result	Opposition Result	Opposition Result	Opposition Result	Rank
Carla Tito	–57 kg	Carstens (PAN) L 1–2	Did not advance		—N/a	Did not advance	
Mell Mina	–67 kg	Torres (PUR) W 2–0	Santos (BRA) L 0–2	Did not advance			
Dayana Folleco Mina	+67 kg	Del Valle (VEN) W 2–0	Gorman-Shore (USA) L 0–2	Did not advance	—N/a	Shipman (HAI) L 1–2	=5
Carla Tito; Mell Mina; Dayana Folleco Mina	Team	Brazil L 24–32	Did not advance				

Poomsae (forms)

Athlete	Event	Round of 16	Quarterfinals	Semifinals	Final	
Athlete	Event	Opposition Result	Opposition Result	Opposition Result	Opposition Result	Rank
Mario Troya	Men's	Morales (EAI) W 7.160–7.110	Del Castillo (PER) L 7.150–7.630	Did not advance		
Katlen Jerves	Women's	Delgado (CUB) W 7.380–7.200	Reclusado (USA) L 7.280–7.530	Did not advance		
Mario Troya; Katlen Jerves	Mixed pair	—N/a			7.600	3rd place, bronze medalist(s)

== Tennis ==
Ecuador qualified a team of three athletes (three women).

Women

Athlete	Event	Round of 64	Round of 32	Round of 16	Quarterfinals	Semifinals	Final / BM	
Athlete	Event	Opposition Result	Opposition Result	Opposition Result	Opposition Result	Opposition Result	Opposition Result	Rank
Camila Romero	Singles	Bye	L. Pérez (PER) L 0–2 (0–6, 2–6)	Did not advance				
Mell Reasco	Singles	Bye	Britez (PAR) W 2–1 (3–6, 6–2, 6–4)	Riera (ARG) L 0–2 (4–6, 0–6)	Did not advance			
Isabel Andrade	Singles	Bye	Capurro (ARG) L 0–2 (1–6, 4–6)	Did not advance				
Camila Romero; Mell Reasco	Doubles	—N/a		Bye	Pigossi / Stefani (BRA) L 0–2 (2–6, 3–6)	Did not advance		

== Triathlon ==
Ecuador qualified a team of six triathletes (three men and three women).

Individual
Men

Athlete	Event	Swim (1.5 km)	Trans 1	Bike (40 km)	Trans 2	Run (10 km)	Total	Rank
Juan José Andrade	Individual	19:38	0:49	56:32	0:27	33:24	1:50:52	20
Gabriel Terán	Individual	18:32	0:54	57:32	0:27	34:29	1:51:56	21
Ramón Matute	Individual	DNS						

Women

Athlete	Event	Swim (1.5 km)	Trans 1	Bike (40 km)	Trans 2	Run (10 km)	Total	Rank
Elizabeth Bravo	Individual	19:39	1:00	1:03:32	0:32	35:04	1:59:49	11
Paula Andrea Jara	Individual	20:44	1:04	1:07:30	0:36	38:11	2:08:07	24
Paula Vega	Individual	21:39	1:02	LAP				

Relay
Mixed

Athlete	Event	Swimming (300 m)	Transition 1	Biking (6.6 km)	Transition2	Running (1.5 km)	Total	Leg rank	Rank
Gabriel Terán	Relay	3:21	0:42	8:48	0:25	4:29	17:45	4	—N/a
Elizabeth Bravo	Relay	4:13	0:55	9:32	0:27	5:09	20:16	7	—N/a
Juan José Andrade	Relay	3:54	0:44	9:03	0:23	4:41	18:45	7	—N/a
Paula Andrea Jara	Relay	4:16	0:48	10:01	0:25	5:31	21:01	6	—N/a
Total	Relay	—N/a					1:17:58	—N/a	5

== Weightlifting ==
Ecuador qualified nine weightlifters (five men and four women).

Men

Athlete	Event	Snatch		Clean & jerk		Total	
Athlete	Event	Weight	Rank	Weight	Rank	Weight	Rank
Víctor Garrido	–61 kg	122	6	145	7	267	6
Jeferson Ramírez	–73 kg	122	12	158	10	280	10
Iván Escudero	–89 kg	158	5	184	7	342	6
Wilmer Contreras	–102 kg	135	14	150	15	285	15
Dixon Arroyo	+102 kg	175	3	196	7	371	3rd place, bronze medalist(s)

Women

Athlete	Event	Snatch		Clean & jerk		Total	
Athlete	Event	Weight	Rank	Weight	Rank	Weight	Rank
Jenifer Becerra	–59 kg	92	7	115	8	207	7
Angie Palacios	–71 kg	118	1	135	2	253	1st place, gold medalist(s)
Tamara Salazar	–81 kg	DNS					
Lisseth Ayoví	+81 kg	119	2	157	1	276	2nd place, silver medalist(s)

== Wrestling ==
Ecuador qualified 7 wrestlers (two men and five women) through the 2022 Pan American Wrestling Championships and the 2023 Pan American Wrestling Championships.

Key:

- VT – Victory by fall.
- PP – Decision by points – the loser with technical points.
- PO – Decision by points – the loser without technical points.
- SP – Technical superiority – the loser with technical points and a margin of victory of at least 9 (Greco-Roman) or 10 (freestyle) points.
- ST – Great superiority – the loser without technical points and a margin of victory of at least 8 (Greco-Roman) or 10 (freestyle) points.
- VA – Decision by withdrawal

Men

Athlete	Event	Round of 16	Quarterfinals	Semifinals	Repechage	Final / BM	
Athlete	Event	Opposition Result	Opposition Result	Opposition Result	Opposition Result	Opposition Result	Rank
Jeremy Peralta	Greco-Roman 60 kg	Mesropian (ARG) W 9-0	Liria (DOM) W 7-2	Hafizov (USA) L 0-8	—N/a	Gurria (MEX) W FO	3rd place, bronze medalist(s)
Andrés Montaño	Greco-Roman 67 kg	Bye	Orta (CUB) L 0-9	Did not advance	—N/a	Almanza (CHI) W 5-3	3rd place, bronze medalist(s)

Women

Athlete	Event	Group round			Round of 16	Quarterfinals	Semifinals	Repechage	Final / BM	
Athlete	Event	Opposition Result	Opposition Result	Rank	Opposition Result	Opposition Result	Opposition Result	Opposition Result	Opposition Result	Rank
Jacqueline Mollocana	50 kg	Golston (USA) W 4-0	Bermúdez (ARG) W FO	1 Q	—N/a		Rojas (VEN) W 4-0^{VT}	—N/a	Guzmán (CUB) L 2-5	2nd place, silver medalist(s)
Lucía Yépez	53 kg	—N/a			Bye	Mallqui (PER) W 10-0	Valdés (CHI) W 13-3	—N/a	Herin (CUB) W 6-0	1st place, gold medalist(s)
Luisa Valverde	57 kg	—N/a			Bye	Taylor (CAN) L 3-12	Did not advance	—N/a	Sarco (VEN) W 6-0^{VT}	3rd place, bronze medalist(s)
Leonela Ayoví	62 kg	—N/a				Miracle (USA) L 4-6	Did not advance			
Génesis Reasco	76 kg	—N/a			Bautista (DOM) W 10-0	Welker (USA) W 9-7	Rentería (COL) L 1-1	Bye	Landaverde (MEX) W 8-0^{VT}	3rd place, bronze medalist(s)

== See also ==
- Ecuador at the 2024 Summer Olympics
