= Shooting at the 2023 Pan American Games – Women's 10 metre air pistol =

Women's 10 metre air pistol at the 2023 Pan American Games
- Venue: Polígono de tiro de Pudahuel
- Dates: October 26
- Competitors: 29 from 16 nations
- Winning score: 234.1

Medalists
Gold medal	Alejandra Zavala	Mexico
Silver medal	Alexis Lagan	United States
Bronze medal	Diana Durango	Ecuador

The women's 10 metre air pistol competition of the shooting events at the 2023 Pan American Games was held on October 26 at Polígono de tiro de Pudahuel in Santiago, Chile.

== Schedule ==
Date	Time	Round
October 26, 2023	09:00	Qualification
October 26, 2023	13:00	Final

== Results ==
=== Qualification round ===
The highest scores advance to the final.

Rank	Athlete	Country	1	2	3	4	5	6	Total	Notes
1	Suman Sanghera	United States	99	96	95	98	97	93	578-17x	Q, QPR
2	Laura Ramos	Argentina	97	94	96	97	95	94	573-20x	Q
3	Alejandra Zavala	Mexico	95	98	94	95	95	96	573-18x	Q
4	Andrea Pérez	Ecuador	96	93	96	94	96	97	572-11x	Q
5	Lisa Emmert	United States	96	96	97	93	95	94	571-15x	Q
6	Annia Becerra	Peru	92	97	95	95	96	95	570-20x	Q
7	Alexis Lagan	United States	94	93	96	96	94	97	570-17x	Q
8	Diana Durango	Ecuador	94	97	95	94	96	94	570-16x	Q
9	Andrea Ibarra	Mexico	96	97	93	94	91	99	570-12x	
10	Laina Pérez	Cuba	96	97	93	94	94	95	569-16x	
11	Abigail Granell	Puerto Rico	95	95	94	90	95	93	562-15x	
12	Jennifer Valentín	Puerto Rico	93	94	93	91	94	94	559-15x	
13	Yanka Vasileva	Canada	90	91	95	96	91	93	556-9x	
14	Cibele Breide	Brazil	93	92	94	90	93	92	554-11x	
15	Kimberly Linares	Independent Athletes Team	94	92	91	91	93	93	554-10x	
16	Jocelyn Núñez	Chile	93	93	91	94	92	91	554-10x	
17	Stephany Gallo	Honduras	90	91	92	93	94	94	554-9x	
18	Sheyla González	Cuba	91	94	93	91	90	93	552-13x	
19	Verónica Lozada	Venezuela	89	95	92	95	91	90	552-6x	
20	Milena Morales	El Salvador	90	90	92	90	94	91	547-13x	
21	Ashley Gallo	Honduras	91	92	88	94	92	90	547-7x	
22	Stefany Figueroa	Independent Athletes Team	94	92	88	93	84	95	546-10x	
23	Tessonna Alleyne	Barbados	89	93	90	90	93	87	542-10x	
24	Biranda Rivera	Peru	90	86	89	92	90	92	539-7x	
25	Audrey-Anne Le Sieur	Canada	93	88	87	92	90	88	538-9x	
26	Maribel Pineda	Venezuela	91	89	91	89	92	86	538-7x	
27	Yasna Valenzuela	Chile	90	92	92	83	86	86	529-3x	
28	Frida Aguilar	El Salvador	93	89	86	88	83	87	526-7x	
	Juana Rueda	Colombia							DSQ	

=== Final ===
The results were as follows:

Rank	Athlete	Country	1st Stage		2nd Stage							Total	Notes
1st place, gold medalist(s)	Alejandra Zavala	Mexico	49.3; 10.5; 9.4; 9.1; 10.0; 10.3	98.8; 9.8; 9.8; 9.6; 10.1; 10.2	118.1; 9.5; 9.8	138.2; 10.5; 9.6	158.0; 10.2; 9.6	177.0; 8.6; 10.4	197.2; 9.9; 10.3	215.2; 9.0; 9.0	8.3; 10.6	234.1	
2nd place, silver medalist(s)	Alexis Lagan	United States	50.0; 10.8; 10.4; 9.2; 9.5; 10.1	98.7; 10.3; 8.9; 9.9; 9.9; 9.7	118.6; 9.7; 10.2	137.2; 8.9; 9.7	156.5; 8.8; 10.5	177.2; 10.3; 10.4	195.4; 8.8; 9.4	214.1; 9.8; 8.9	9.9; 7.5	231.5	
3rd place, bronze medalist(s)	Diana Durango	Ecuador	49.2; 10.2; 10.0; 8.9; 10.1; 10.0	97.4; 8.6; 10.1; 9.7; 9.7; 10.1	117.3; 10.0; 9.9	135.4; 9.6; 8.5	156.1; 10.2; 10.5	175.6; 9.9; 9.6	194.3; 10.6; 8.1	9.9; 8.8		213.0	
4	Andrea Pérez	Ecuador	49.1; 9.7; 8.3; 10.8; 10.7; 9.6	96.5; 10.0; 8.5; 8.9; 9.7; 10.3	116.5; 10.0; 10.0	135.6; 9.9; 9.2	155.5; 10.2; 9.7	174.2; 9.6; 9.1	10.4; 9.1			193.7	
5	Lisa Emmert	United States	48.0; 10.1; 9.9; 10.5; 8.3; 9.2	95.9; 10.3; 9.0; 8.8; 9.9; 9.9	115.5; 10.1; 9.5	134.2; 9.0; 9.7	154.3; 9.5; 10.6	10.3; 9.1				173.7	
6	Suman Sanghera	United States	46.3; 7.9; 9.4; 9.8; 9.2; 10.0	96.0; 9.8; 10.4; 9.9; 10.2; 9.4	116.9; 10.4; 10.5	135.9; 10.1; 8.9	7.6; 10.1					153.6	
7	Laura Ramos	Argentina	48.0; 9.8; 9.2; 10.2; 8.6; 10.2	95.1; 9.5; 8.8; 10.4; 9.3; 9.1	112.5; 7.1; 10.3	8.1; 9.1						129.7	
8	Annia Becerra	Peru	46.8; 9.5; 6.7; 10.1; 10.3; 10.2	92.8; 8.8; 10.2; 10.1; 7.8; 9.1	9.4; 10.2							112.4	
