= Shooting at the 2023 Pan American Games – Women's 25 metre pistol =

Women's 25 metre air pistol at the 2023 Pan American Games
- Venue: Polígono de tiro de Pudahuel
- Dates: October 24
- Competitors: 24 from 15 nations

Medalists
Gold medal	Alejandra Zavala	Mexico
Silver medal	Diana Durango	Ecuador
Bronze medal	Alexis Lagan	United States

The women's 25 metre air pistol competition of the shooting events at the 2023 Pan American Games was held on October 24 at Polígono de tiro de Pudahuel in Santiago, Chile.

== Schedule ==
Date	Time	Round
October 24, 2023	09:00	Qualification - Precision
October 24, 2023	11:00	Qualification - Rapid
October 24, 2023	13:00	Final

== Results ==
=== Qualification round ===
The best eight scores advance to the final.

Rank	Athlete	Country	8 s	6 s	4 s	8 s	6 s	4 s	Total	Notes
1	Lisa Emmert	United States	96	97	97	99	92	98	573-14x	Q
2	Alejandra Zavala	Mexico	96	94	95	97	99	97	578-13x	Q
3	Andrea Ibarra	Mexico	95	93	94	97	98	96	573-14x	Q
4	Diana Durango	Ecuador	96	93	94	98	98	94	573-13x	Q
5	Andrea Pérez	Ecuador	94	98	93	97	95	95	573-14x	Q
6	Alexis Lagan	United States	94	94	95	95	97	96	571-15x	Q
7	Laina Pérez	Cuba	88	95	95	95	98	98	569-12x	Q
8	Maribel Pineda	Venezuela	93	97	95	92	92	95	564-10x	Q
9	Brianda Rivera	Peru	88	95	89	96	98	98	564-7x	
10	Cibele Breide	Brazil	89	94	90	98	96	95	562-14x	
11	Elizabeth Gustafson	Canada	94	97	99	89	91	91	561-14x	
12	Miriam Quintanilla	Peru	91	91	94	93	97	94	560-10x	
13	Juana Rueda	Colombia	94	93	94	89	93	96	559-14x	
14	Lynda Kiejko	Canada	93	91	93	97	90	95	559-12x	
15	Ana Luiza Ferrão	Brazil	85	94	89	96	96	95	555-12x	
16	Milena Morales	El Salvador	90	96	93	89	95	90	553-13x	
17	Sheyla González	Cuba	89	92	91	95	95	91	553-7x	
18	Macarena Caballero	Chile	94	94	94	90	87	93	552-12x	
19	Lucía Menéndez	Independent Athletes Team	96	90	94	87	90	94	551-13x	
20	Laura Ramos	Argentina	97	94	91	92	91	86	551-9x	
21	Stefany Figueroa	Independent Athletes Team	92	88	92	94	94	91	551-8x	
22	Jocelyn Núñez	Chile	92	92	93	92	90	90	549-9x	
23	Jennifer Valentín	Puerto Rico	88	86	89	84	80	89	516-5x	
24	Tessonna Alleyne	Barbados	84	81	86	91	88	78	508-7x	

=== Final ===
The results were as follows:

Rank	Athlete	Country	1st Stage Stage			2nd Stage Stage - Elimination							Total	Notes
1st place, gold medalist(s)	Alejandra Zavala	Mexico	3; 3	6; 3	9; 3	13; 4	18; 5	20; 2	24; 4	25; 1	26; 1	3	29	PR
2nd place, silver medalist(s)	Diana Durango	Ecuador	3; 3	5; 2	9; 4	12; 3	15; 3	17; 2	20; 3	25; 5	27; 2	1	28	
3rd place, bronze medalist(s)	Alexis Lagan	United States	2; 2	4; 2	8; 4	13; 5	15; 2	19; 4	22; 3	24; 2	0		24	
4	Lisa Emmert	United States	2; 2	6; 4	9; 3	12; 3	14; 2	16; 2	20; 4	2			22	
5	Andrea Ibarra	Mexico	3; 3	5; 2	7; 2	11; 4	14; 3	16; 2	3				19	
6	Laina Pérez	Cuba	1; 1	5; 4	7; 2	8; 1	11; 3	3					14	
7	Andrea Pérez	Ecuador	2; 2	3; 1	7; 4	10; 3	0						10	
8	Maribel Pineda	Venezuela	1; 1	2; 1	4; 2	1							5	
