= Shooting at the 2015 Pan American Games – Women's 10 metre air pistol =

Shooting – Women's 10 metre air pistol at the 2015 Pan American Games
- Venue: Pan Am Shooting Centre
- Dates: July 12
- Competitors: 24 from 15 nations
- Gold medal match score: 195.7

Medalists
Gold medal	Lynda Kiejko	Canada
Silver medal	Alejandra Zavala	Mexico
Bronze medal	Lilian Castro	El Salvador

The women's 10 metre air pistol shooting event at the 2015 Pan American Games will be held on July 12 at the Pan Am Shooting Centre in Innisfil.

The event consisted of two rounds: a qualifier and a final. In the qualifier, each shooter fired 60 shots with an air pistol at 10 metres distance. Scores for each shot were in increments of 1, with a maximum score of 10.

The top 8 shooters in the qualifying round moved on to the final round. There, they fired an additional 10 shots. These shots scored in increments of .1, with a maximum score of 10.9. The total score from all 70 shots was used to determine final ranking.

The winners of all fifteen events, along with the runner up in the men's air rifle, skeet, trap and both women's rifle events will qualify for the 2016 Summer Olympics in Rio de Janeiro, Brazil (granted the athlete has not yet earned a quota for their country).

== Schedule ==
All times are Central Standard Time (UTC−6).

Date	Time	Round
July 12, 2015	11:15	Qualification
July 12, 2015	14:00	Final

== Results ==
=== Qualification round ===
Rank	Athlete	Country	1	2	3	4	Total	Notes
1	Courtney Anthony	United States	97	96	97	96	386-15x	Q, PR
2	Laina Pérez	Cuba	92	97	94	95	378-09x	Q
3	Alejandra Zavala	Mexico	95	96	94	93	378-07x	Q
4	Lynda Kiejko	Canada	92	93	95	95	375-08x	Q
5	Sandra Uptagrafft	United States	91	95	93	95	374-04x	Q
6	Lilian Castro	El Salvador	88	95	94	94	371-08x	Q
7	Laura Ramos	Argentina	94	93	92	92	371-05x	Q
8	Sheyla Gonzalez	Cuba	93	94	90	93	370-08x	Q
9	Andrea Pérez Peña	Ecuador	94	91	92	92	369-12x	
10	Amanda Mondol	Colombia	93	91	90	95	369-08x	
11	Mariana Quintanilla Camargo	Peru	94	92	91	92	369-07x	
12	Mariana Nava	Mexico	94	95	88	92	369-05x	
13	Jenny Bedoya	Ecuador	94	91	90	93	368-10x	
14	Maria Pia Herrera	Argentina	89	90	94	95	368-05x	
15	Delmi Cruz	Guatemala	92	91	92	92	367-07x	
16	Yanka Vasileva	Canada	95	92	93	87	367-06x	
17	Maribel Pineda	Venezuela	90	90	92	93	365-04x	
18	Lucia Menendez	Guatemala	91	95	88	90	364-03x	
19	Ivon Bucott	Venezuela	87	91	92	92	362-04x	
20	Rachel Silveira	Brazil	92	88	91	90	361-03x	
21	Brianda Rivera	Peru	87	95	95	83	360-04x	
22	Rosario Piña	Dominican Republic	87	92	89	88	356-02x	
23	Karen Nogueina-Gerard	Virgin Islands	92	89	83	86	350-05x	
24	Claudia Fajardo	Honduras	92	81	83	94	350-03x	

=== Final ===
Rank	Athlete	Country	1	2	3	4	5	6	7	8	9	Total	Notes
1st place, gold medalist(s)	Lynda Kiejko	Canada	29.5; 9.7; 9.4; 10.4	58.8; 10.1; 9.6; 9.6	77.3; 8.8; 9.7	97.4; 10.3; 9.8	117.1; 9.6; 10.1	137.0; 9.9; 10.0	156.6; 10.0; 9.6	175.9; 10.7; 8.6	195.7; 9.9; 9.9	195.7	FPR
2nd place, silver medalist(s)	Alejandra Zavala	Mexico	30.1; 10.4; 9.2; 10.5	58.9; 8.6; 10.2; 10.0	77.9; 8.7; 10.3	97.3; 10.5; 8.9	118.2; 10.1; 10.8	137.3; 9.3; 9.8	157.3; 9.6; 10.4	175.2; 9.3; 8.6	194.3; 8.7; 10.4	194.3	
3rd place, bronze medalist(s)	Lilian Castro	El Salvador	27.8; 10.0; 8.2; 9.6	55.5; 8.9; 8.4; 10.4	76.2; 10.9; 9.8	95.2; 9.4; 9.6	115.9; 10.4; 10.3	135.3; 9.5; 9.9	153.5; 7.9; 10.3	172.0; 9.9; 8.6	172.0	172.0	
4	Laina Pérez	Cuba	28.3; 9.8; 9.0; 9.5	59.2; 9.8; 10.6; 10.5	77.1; 9.6; 8.3	96.0; 9.7; 9.2	115.8; 9.8; 10.0	135.5; 10.5; 9.2	153.2; 9.4; 8.3	153.2	153.2	153.2	
5	Sheyla Gonzalez	Cuba	28.4; 9.2; 9.6; 9.6	58.0; 10.4; 8.6; 10.6	76.9; 9.4; 9.5	94.3; 8.4; 9.0	114.6; 9.9; 10.4	133.8; 8.9; 10.3	133.8	133.8	133.8	133.8	
6	Laura Ramos	Argentina	26.8; 9.7; 8.8; 8.3	56.1; 10.0; 9.6; 9.7	74.5; 10.2; 8.2	94.2; 9.6; 10.1	112.5; 9.9; 8.4	112.5	112.5	112.5	112.5	112.5	
7	Courtney Anthony	United States	27.7; 8.4; 9.5; 9.8	57.0; 9.4; 10.0; 9.9	75.0; 9.0; 9.0	93.9; 8.4; 10.5	93.9	93.9	93.9	93.9	93.9	93.9	
8	Sandra Uptagrafft	United States	27.6; 9.6; 9.5; 8.5	55.4; 8.5; 9.4; 9.9	74.0; 8.3; 10.3	74.0	74.0	74.0	74.0	74.0	74.0	74.0	
