= Shooting at the 2006 South American Games =

- Venue: Club Tiro Federal Argentino

There were eight shooting events at the 2006 South American Games in Buenos Aires, Argentina. They included four for men and four for women in the rifle and pistol disciplines.

Argentina led the way with gold medals in five out of eight events, continuing their dominance in shooting at the South American Games. Cecilia Zeid, who set a new South American continental record at the competition, called the Games an "excellent preparation" for the 2007 Pan American Games.

Meanwhile, Venezuela captured gold medals in two events, winning both the individual and team categories in the women's 25 meter pistol. Lastly, Chilean shooter Mauricio Huerta won the gold medal in the 10 metre air rifle individual event by setting a new South American continental record.

The pair of silver medals won by Bolivian shooters Carina García and Wendy Palomeque were the only silver (or gold) medals won by the Bolivian delegation, in any sport.

== Medal summary ==
=== Medal table ===
* Host nation (Argentina)

Rank	Nation	Gold	Silver	Bronze	Total
1	Argentina (ARG)*	5	3	1	9
2	Venezuela (VEN)	2	0	3	5
3	Chile (CHI)	1	1	0	2
4	Ecuador (ECU)	0	1	2	3
5	Bolivia (BOL)	0	1	1	2
5	Brazil (BRA)	0	1	1	2
7	Colombia (COL)	0	1	0	1
Totals (7 entries)		8	8	8	24

=== Medallists ===
Men

Event	Gold	Silver	Bronze
10 metre air rifle individual	(Chile) Mauricio Huerta	(Argentina) Ángel Rosendo Velarte	(Argentina) Pablo Álvarez
10 metre air rifle team	(Argentina) Ángel Rosendo Velarte (Argentina) Pablo Álvarez	(Chile) Mauricio Huerta (Chile) Gonzalo Moncada	(Ecuador) Juan Diego Moscoso (Ecuador) Fabián Rosado
50 metre free pistol individual	(Argentina) Rafael Olivera Araus	(Argentina) Diego Luna Avellaneda	(Venezuela) Marco Núñez
50 metre free pistol team	(Argentina) Rafael Olivera Araus (Argentina) Diego Luna Avellaneda	(Ecuador) Alberto Guilcapi (Ecuador) Esteban Moscoso	(Venezuela) Marco Núñez (Venezuela) Felipe Beuvrin

Women's events

Event	Gold	Silver	Bronze
10 metre air rifle individual	(Argentina) Cecilia Zeid	(Argentina) Amelia Fournel	(Bolivia) Carina García
10 metre air rifle team	(Argentina) Cecilia Zeid (Argentina) Amelia Fournel	(Bolivia) Carina García (Bolivia) Wendy Palomeque	(Venezuela) Diliana Mendez (Venezuela) Maria Dorato
25 metre pistol individual	(Venezuela) Editzy Pimentel	(Brazil) Anna Luiza Ferrão	(Ecuador) Carmen Malo
25 metre pistol team	(Venezuela) Editzy Pimentel (Venezuela) Josmarla Jazmín Simanca Rattia	(Colombia) Amanda Mondol (Colombia) Adriana Rendón	(Brazil) Anna Luiza Ferrão (Brazil) Rachel Maria de Cast Silveira
