= Breaking at the 2023 Pan American Games – B-Girls =

B-Girls at the 2023 Pan American Games
- Venue: Chimkowe Gym
- Dates: November 3 – November 4
- Competitors: 16 from 9 nations

Medalists
Gold medal	Sunny	United States
Silver medal	Luma	Colombia
Bronze medal	La Vix	United States

The b-girls competition of the breaking events at the 2023 Pan American Games was held from November 3 to 4 at Chimkowe Gym in Santiago, Chile.

Breaking made its debut in 2023 as a Pan American sport, serving as a qualifier for its Olympic debut at Paris 2024.

== Schedule ==
Date	Time	Round
November 3, 2023	17:20	Round Robin
November 4, 2023	17:00	Quarterfinals
November 4, 2023	18:0	Semifinals
November 4, 2023	19:10	Final

== Round Robin ==
=== Group A ===
The athletes with the two highest votes advance to quarterfinals.

Pos	Athlete	Nickname	Pld	W	D	L	V
1	Sunny Choi (USA)	"Sunny"	3	3	0	0	51
2	Mayara Collins (BRA)	"Mini Japa"	3	2	0	1	38
3	Bárbara Carmona (CHI)	"Menta"	3	1	0	2	12
4	Nathana Venâncio (BRA)	"Nathana"	3	0	0	3	7

	Score	
Sunny (USA)	2–0	Mini Japa (BRA)
Nathana (BRA)	0–2	Menta (CHI)
Sunny (USA)	2–0	Nathana (BRA)
Mini Japa (BRA)	2–0	Menta (CHI)
Sunny (USA)	2–0	Menta (CHI)
Mini Japa (BRA)	2–0	Nathana (BRA)

=== Group B ===
The athletes with the two highest votes advance to quarterfinals.

Pos	Athlete	Nickname	Pld	W	D	L	V
1	Luisa Tejada (COL)	"Luma"	3	3	0	0	51
2	Isis Granda (ECU)	"Isis"	3	2	0	1	37
3	Valentina Núñez (CHI)	"Vale Chica"	3	1	0	2	20
4	Gloria Reyes (MEX)	"Xunli"	3	0	0	3	0

	Score	
Luma (COL)	2–0	Isis (ECU)
Xunli (MEX)	0–2	Vale Chica (CHI)
Luma (COL)	2–0	Xunli (MEX)
Isis (ECU)	2–0	Vale Chica (CHI)
Luma (COL)	2–0	Vale Chica (CHI)
Isis (ECU)	2–0	Xunli (MEX)

=== Group C ===
The athletes with the two highest votes advance to quarterfinals.

Pos	Athlete	Nickname	Pld	W	D	L	V
1	Tiffany Leung (CAN)	"Tiff"	3	3	0	0	49
2	Emma Misak (CAN)	"Emma"	3	2	0	1	40
3	Karla Muñoz (ECU)	"Lakshmi Hop"	3	1	0	2	17
4	Tiara Tagle (PER)	"Tiara"	3	0	0	3	2

	Score	
Tiff (CAN)	2–0	Emma (CAN)
Tiara (PER)	0–2	Lakshmi Hop (ECU)
Tiff (CAN)	2–0	Tiara (PER)
Emma (CAN)	2–0	Lakshmi Hop (ECU)
Tiff (CAN)	2–0	Lakshmi Hop (ECU)
Emma (CAN)	2–0	Tiara (PER)

=== Group D ===
The athletes with the two highest votes advance to quarterfinals.

Pos	Athlete	Nickname	Pld	W	D	L	V
1	Vicky Chang (USA)	"La Vix"	3	3	0	0	50
2	Swami Mostalac (MEX)	"Swami"	3	2	0	1	37
3	Abril Molina (ARG)	"Abril"	3	1	0	2	18
4	Lourdes Huachuhuilca (PER)	"Monchi"	3	0	0	3	3

	Score	
Swami (MEX)	0–2	La Vix (USA)
Abril (ARG)	2–0	Monchi (PER)
Swami (MEX)	2–0	Abril (ARG)
La Vix (USA)	2–0	Monchi (PER)
Swami (MEX)	2–0	Monchi (PER)
La Vix (USA)	2–0	Abril (ARG)

=== Bracket ===
Quarterfinals
Isis (ECU)	1
Tiff (CAN)	2
Sunny (USA)	2
Swami (MEX)	0
La Vix (USA)	2
Mini Japa (BRA)	0
Luma (COL)	2
Emma (CAN)	0

Semifinals
Sunny (USA)	3
Tiff (CAN)	0
La Vix (USA)	1
Luma (COL)	2

Gold medal match
Luma (COL)	0
Sunny (USA)	3
Bronze-medal match
La Vix (USA)	3
Tiff (CAN)	0
