= Barbados at the 2023 Pan American Games =

- IOC code: BAR
- NOC: Barbados Olympic Association

in Santiago, Chile 20 October 2023 – 5 November 2023
- Competitors: 27 in 19 sports
- Flag bearer (opening): Kennie King & Michelle Elliot
- Flag bearer (closing): Matthew Wright & Meagan Best
- Medals Ranked 30th: Gold 0 Silver 0 Bronze 2 Total 2

Pan American Games appearances (overview)
- 1963; 1967; 1971; 1975; 1979; 1983; 1987; 1991; 1995; 1999; 2003; 2007; 2011; 2015; 2019; 2023

Barbados is scheduled to compete at the 2023 Pan American Games in Santiago, Chile from October 20 to November 5, 2023. This will be Barbados' 16th appearance at the Pan American Games, having competed at every edition of the games since the nation's debut, in 1963.

On 6 October 2023, the Barbados Olympic Association officially named the team of 29 athletes (16 men and 13 women) competing in 19 sports (e-sports total of 1 is not included). Badminton athlete Kennie King and sport shooter Michelle Elliot were the country's flagbearers during the opening ceremony. Meanwhile, triathlete Matthew Wright and squash athlete Meagan Best were the country's flagbearers during the closing ceremony.

== Medallists ==
The following Barbadian competitors won medals at the games. In the by discipline sections below, medalists' names are bolded.

Medal	Name	Sport	Event	Date
Bronze	Meagan Best; Margot Prow	Squash	Women's doubles	November 3
Bronze	Meagan Best; Margot Prow; Amanda Haywood	Squash	Women's team	November 5

== Competitors ==
The following is the list of number of competitors (per gender) participating at the games per sport/discipline.

Sport	Men	Women	Total
Athletics	0	1	1
Badminton	1	0	1
Boxing	2	1	3
Cycling	0	1	1
Golf	0	1	1
Gymnastics	0	1	1
Rowing	1	0	1
Sailing	1	0	1
Shooting	4	2	6
Squash	0	3	3
Surfing	0	1	1
Swimming	1	1	2
Table tennis	1	0	1
Taekwondo	1	0	1
Tennis	1	0	1
Triathlon	1	0	1
Weightlifting	1	0	1
Wrestling	1	0	1
Total	16	11	27

== Athletics ==
Barbados qualified one female athlete.

Key

- Note–Ranks given for track events are within the athlete's heat only
- **Q** = Qualified for the next round
- **q** = Qualified for the next round as a fastest loser
- Bye = Athlete not required to compete in round

Women

Track & road events

Athlete	Event	Semifinal		Final	
Athlete	Event	Time	Rank	Time	Rank
Sonia Gaskin	800 m	2:08.14	9	Did not advance	

== Badminton ==
Barbados qualified one male athlete.

Athlete	Event	First round	Second round	Quarterfinals	Semifinals	Final / BM	
Athlete	Event	Opposition Result	Opposition Result	Opposition Result	Opposition Result	Opposition Result	Rank
Kennie King	Men's singles	Vazquez (CUB); **L** (16–21, 15–21)	Did not advance				

== Boxing ==
Barbados qualified three boxers (two men and one woman).

Men

Athlete	Event	Round of 16	Quarterfinal	Semifinal	Final	
Athlete	Event	Opposition Result	Opposition Result	Opposition Result	Opposition Result	Rank
Jabali Breedy	–51 kg	González (VEN); **L** 0–5	Did not advance			
Charles Cox	–80 kg	Brito (PUR); **W** RSC R3	Belony-Dulièpre (HAI); **L** 1–4	Did not advance		

Women

Athlete	Event	Round of 16	Quarterfinal	Semifinal	Final	
Athlete	Event	Opposition Result	Opposition Result	Opposition Result	Opposition Result	Rank
Kimberley Gittens	–75 kg	Bye	Pereira (BRA); **L** 0–5	Did not advance		

== Cycling ==
Barbados qualified one female cyclist.

=== Track ===
Omnium

Athlete	Event	Scratch race		Tempo race		Elimination race		Points race		Total	
Athlete	Event	Points	Rank	Points	Rank	Points	Rank	Points	Rank	Points	Rank
Amber Joseph	Women's	38	2	30	6	22	10	15	1	105	6

== Golf ==
Barbados qualified one female golfer.

Athlete	Event	Round 1	Round 2	Round 3	Round 4	Total		
Athlete	Event	Score	Score	Score	Score	Score	Par	Rank
Emily Odwin	Women's individual	76	76	75	75	302	+14	=18

== Gymnastics ==
=== Artistic ===
Barbados qualified one female gymnast in artistic at the 2023 Pan American Artistic Gymnastics Championships.

Women

Athlete	Event	Qualification				Total	Rank
Athlete	Event	V	UB	BB	F	Total	Rank
Anya Pilgrim	Individual all-around	12.900	10.733	10.500	11.633	45.766	18

Qualification Legend: Q = Qualified to apparatus final

== Rowing ==
Barbados qualified one male rower.

Men

Athlete	Event	Heat		Repechage		Semifinal		Final A/B	
Athlete	Event	Time	Rank	Time	Rank	Time	Rank	Time	Rank
Kyle Spenard	Single sculls	8:30:56	5 **R**	8:04:30	6 **FC**	—		8:09.31	17

== Sailing ==
Barbados qualified one sailor after reallocation of an unused spot.

Men

Athlete	Event	Opening series												Finals		
Athlete	Event	1	2	3	4	5	6	7	8	9	10	Points	Rank	M	Points	Rank
Scott Gittens	Laser	19	20	~~22~~	21	22	21	14	20	22	17	176	20	Did not advance		

== Shooting ==
Barbados qualified a total of six shooters (four men and two women).

Men

Pistol and rifle

Athlete	Event	Qualification		Final	
Athlete	Event	Points	Rank	Points	Rank
Dave Seale	10 m air pistol	561	19	Did not advance	
Dave Seale	25 m rapid fire pistol	519	20	Did not advance	

Shotgun

Athlete	Event	Qualification		Final	
Athlete	Event	Points	Rank	Points	Rank
Richard Greenidge	Trap	93	26	Did not advance	
Richard Greenidge	Trap	109	17	Did not advance	
Justin St. John	Skeet	116	8	Did not advance	

Women

Pistol and rifle

Athlete	Event	Qualification		Final	
Athlete	Event	Points	Rank	Points	Rank
Tesonna Alleyney	10 m air pistol	542	23	Did not advance	
Tesonna Alleyney	25 m pistol	508	24	Did not advance	

Shotgun

Athlete	Event	Qualification		Final	
Athlete	Event	Points	Rank	Points	Rank
Michelle Elliot	Skeet	110	7	Did not advance	

Mixed

Athlete	Event	Qualification		Final / BM	
Athlete	Event	Points	Rank	Opposition Result	Rank
Tessonna Alleyne; Dave Seale	10 m air pistol team	553	21	Did not advance	
Michael Maskell; Michelle Elliot	Skeet team	126	11	Did not advance	

== Squash ==
Barbados qualified a team of three female athletes through the 2023 Pan American Squash Championships.

Women

Athlete	Event	Round of 32	Round of 16	Quarterfinal	Semifinal / Cl.	Final / BM / Pl.	
Athlete	Event	Opposition Result	Opposition Result	Opposition Result	Opposition Result	Opposition Result	Rank
Margot Prow	Singles	Bueñano (ECU); **W** 3–1	Sobhy (USA); **L** 0–3	Did not advance			
Meagan Best	Singles	Bye	Bautista (COL); **W** 3–1	Naughton (CAN); **L** 2–3	Did not advance		
**Margot Prow**; **Meagan Best**	Doubles	—		Sandoval / Bonilla (EAI); **W** 2–0	Tovar / Bautista (COL); **L** 0–2	Did not advance	3rd place, bronze medalist(s)
**Amanda Haywood**; **Margot Prow**; **Meagan Best**	Team	—		Chile; **W** 2–0	United States; **L** 0–2	Did not advance	3rd place, bronze medalist(s)

== Surfing ==
Barbados qualified one female surfer.

Women

Athlete	Event	Round 1	Round 2	Round 3	Round 4	Repechage 1	Repechage 2	Repechage 3	Repechage 4	Final / BM	
Athlete	Event	Opposition Result	Opposition Result	Opposition Result	Opposition Result	Opposition Result	Opposition Result	Opposition Result	Opposition Result	Opposition Result	Rank
Chelsea Tuach	Shortboard	Gómez (COL); **W** 8.67–8.23	López (CHI); **L** 10.50–10.90	Did not advance		Bye	Aguirre (PER); **L** 9.50–12.57	Did not advance			

== Swimming ==
Barbados qualified two swimmers (one man and one woman).

Key

- Note – Ranks given are for the entire round
- **NR** – National record
- **Q** – Qualified to the medal final
- **q** – Qualified to the non-medal final

Men

Athlete	Event	Heat		Final	
Athlete	Event	Time	Rank	Time	Rank
Jack Kirby	50 m freestyle	23.48	20	Did not advance	
Jack Kirby	100 m backstroke	56.11	9 **q**	56.12	10

Women

Athlete	Event	Heat		Final	
Athlete	Event	Time	Rank	Time	Rank
Danielle Titus	100 m backstroke	1:04.66	20	Did not advance	
Danielle Titus	200 m backstroke	2:26.90	24	Did not advance	

== Table tennis ==
Barbados qualified one male table tennis athlete at the final qualification tournament in Lima, Peru.

Men

Athlete	Event	Round of 32	Round of 16	Quarterfinal	Semifinal	Final / BM	
Athlete	Event	Opposition Result	Opposition Result	Opposition Result	Opposition Result	Opposition Result	Rank
Tyrese Knight	Singles	Lorenzo (ARG); **L** 1–4	Did not advance				

== Taekwondo ==
Barbados qualified one male athlete after receiving a wildcard.

Kyorugi

Men

Athlete	Event	Round of 16	Quarterfinals	Semifinals	Repechage	Final/ BM	
Athlete	Event	Opposition Result	Opposition Result	Opposition Result	Opposition Result	Opposition Result	Rank
Chioke Holder	+80 kg	Alves (ARG); **L** 0–2	Did not advance				

== Tennis ==
Barbados qualified one male tennis player.

Men

Athlete	Event	Round of 64	Round of 32	Round of 16	Quarterfinal	Semifinal	Final / BM	
Athlete	Event	Opposition Result	Opposition Result	Opposition Result	Opposition Result	Opposition Result	Opposition Result	Rank
Darian King	Singles	Bye	Barrios (CHI); **L** 6–4, 3–6, 5–7	Did not advance				

== Triathlon ==
Barbados qualified one male triathlete.

Athlete	Event	Swim (1.5 km)	Trans 1	Bike (40 km)	Trans 2	Run (10 km)	Total	Rank
Matthew Wright	Men's individual	18:21	0:43	55:42	0:26	32:08	1:47.23	8

== Weightlifting ==
Barbados qualified two male weightlifters.

Men

Athlete	Event	Snatch		Clean & Jerk		Total	Rank
Athlete	Event	Result	Rank	Result	Rank	Total	Rank
Daniel Griffith	–89 kg	123	12	158	3	281	12
Quontana Clarke	–102 kg	95	16	137	16	232	16

== Wrestling ==
Barbados qualified one male wrestler after receiving a wildcard.

Key:

- VT – Victory by fall.
- PP – Decision by points – the loser with technical points.
- PO – Decision by points – the loser without technical points.
- SP – Technical superiority – the loser with technical points and a margin of victory of at least 9 (Greco-Roman) or 10 (freestyle) points.
- ST – Great superiority – the loser without technical points and a margin of victory of at least 8 (Greco-Roman) or 10 (freestyle) points.
- VA – Decision by withdrawal

Men

Athlete	Event	Round of 16	Quarterfinal	Semifinal	Final / BM	
Athlete	Event	Opposition Result	Opposition Result	Opposition Result	Opposition Result	Rank
Adrian Maynard	Greco-Roman 77 kg	Bye	Bernal (CHI); **L** 0–9	Did not advance		

== Demonstration sports ==
=== Esports ===
Barbados qualified a male athlete.

Men

- Keoma Mallet

== See also ==
- Barbados at the 2023 Parapan American Games
- Barbados at the 2024 Summer Olympics
