= Cycling at the 2023 Pan American Games – Men's road race =

Men's road race at the 2023 Pan American Games
- Venue: Streets of Isla de Maipo
- Dates: October 29
- Competitors: 45 from 16 nations
- Winning time: 3:37.56

Medalists
| Gold medal | Jhonatan Narváez | Ecuador |
| Silver medal | Eduardo Sepúlveda | Argentina |
| Bronze medal | Eric Fagúndez | Uruguay |

The men's road race competition of the cycling events at the 2023 Pan American Games was held on October 29 on the streets of Isla de Maipo, Chile.

== Schedule ==
| Date | Time | Round |
|---|---|---|
| October 29, 2023 | 13:00 | Final |

== Results ==
| Rank | Rider | Nation | Time |
|---|---|---|---|
| 1st place, gold medalist(s) | Jhonatan Narváez | Ecuador | 3:37.56 |
| 2nd place, silver medalist(s) | Eduardo Sepúlveda | Argentina | 3:37.57 |
| 3rd place, bronze medalist(s) | Eric Fagúndez | Uruguay | 3:37.57 |
| 4 | Martín Vidaurre | Chile | 3:37.57 |
| 5 | Nícolas Sessler | Brazil | 3:37.57 |
| 6 | Orluis Aular | Venezuela | 3:37.58 |
| 7 | Richard Carapaz | Ecuador | 3:38.02 |
| 8 | Riley Pickrell | Canada | 3:41.08 |
| 9 | Victor Ocampo | Colombia | 3:43.22 |
| 10 | Laureano Rosas | Argentina | 3:43.35 |
| 11 | Hugo Ruiz | Peru | 3:46.08 |
| 12 | Bolivar Espinosa | Panama | 3:46.14 |
| 13 | Héctor Quintana | Chile | 3:46.16 |
| 14 | Conor White | Bermuda | 3:46.16 |
| 15 | Tomás Contte | Argentina | 3:46.17 |
| 16 | Leangel Linarez | Venezuela | 3:46.19 |
| 17 | Chris Ernst | Canada | 3:46.24 |
| 18 | Roderyck Asconeguy | Uruguay | 3:46.33 |
| 19 | Vicente Rojas | Chile | 3:46.07 |
| 20 | Ruben Ramos | Argentina | 3:47.08 |
| 21 | Kacio Fonseca | Brazil | 3:48.02 |
| 22 | Ulises Castillo | Mexico | 3:48.07 |
| 23 | Sebastian Brenes | Costa Rica | 3:48.29 |
| 24 | Kaden Hopkins | Bermuda | 3:48.29 |
| 25 | Caio Godoy | Brazil | 3:48.29 |
| 26 | Campbell Parrish | Canada | 3:48.30 |
| 27 | Steven Polanco | Dominican Republic | 3:48.30 |
| 28 | Clever Martínez | Venezuela | 3:48.30 |
| 29 | Luis Enrique López | Honduras | 3:48.31 |
| 30 | Armando Camargo | Brazil | 3:48.31 |
| 31 | Walter Vargas | Colombia | 3:48.31 |
| 32 | Harold Tejada | Colombia | 3:48.37 |
| 33 | Brayan Sánchez | Colombia | 3:51.42 |
| 34 | Gabriel Rojas | Costa Rica | 3:55.11 |
| | Carson Mattern | Canada | OTL |
| | Alex Julajuj | Independent Athletes Team | OTL |
| | Ricardo Peñas | Mexico | DNF |
| | Tomás Aguirre | Mexico | DNF |
| | Diego Rodríguez | Uruguay | DNF |
| | Jason Huertas | Costa Rica | DNF |
| | José Luis Rodríguez | Chile | DNF |
| | Leonidas Novoa | Ecuador | DNF |
