= Shooting at the 2023 Pan American Games – Men's 10 metre air pistol =

Men's 10 metre air pistol at the 2023 Pan American Games
- Venue: Polígono de tiro de Pudahuel
- Dates: October 26
- Competitors: 33 from 20 nations
- Winning score: 240.5

Medalists
Gold medal	Tugrul Ozer	Canada
Silver medal	James Hall	United States
Bronze medal	Felipe Wu	Brazil

The men's 10 metre air pistol competition of the shooting events at the 2023 Pan American Games was held on October 26 at Polígono de tiro de Pudahuel Santiago, Chile.

== Schedule ==
Date	Time	Round
October 26, 2023	11:00	Qualification
October 26, 2023	14:30	Final

== Results ==
=== Qualification round ===
The highest scores advance to the final.

Rank	Athlete	Country	1	2	3	4	5	6	Total	Notes
1	Albino Jiménes	Independent Athletes Team	94	94	95	97	95	99	574-14x	Q
2	Tugrul Ozer	Canada	94	97	98	94	98	93	574-9x	Q
3	Felipe Wu	Brazil	93	97	95	96	96	96	573-19x	Q
4	Nickolaus Mowrer	United States	97	94	96	95	95	95	572-12x	Q
5	Philipe Chateaubrian	Brazil	96	95	93	97	92	98	571-11x	Q
6	Fernando Pozo	Ecuador	95	95	94	97	92	96	569-13x	Q
7	James Hall	United States	96	95	95	94	94	95	569-11x	Q
8	Jorge Potrillé	Cuba	95	97	95	94	93	95	569-9x	Q
9	Yautung Cueva	Ecuador	96	95	95	95	95	91	567-13x	
10	Marko Carrillo	Peru	94	94	93	92	96	97	566-14x	
11	Diego Parra	Chile	91	91	98	95	95	96	566-11x	
12	Carlos González	Mexico	91	95	93	92	97	97	565-19x	
13	Juan Manuel Fragueiro	Argentina	95	92	94	92	96	96	565-15x	
14	Luis Ramón López	Puerto Rico	94	93	95	95	93	93	563-13x	
15	Daniel Urquiza	Mexico	92	96	94	94	95	92	563-9x	
16	Rudolf Knijnenburg	Bolivia	97	93	96	92	92	93	563-8x	
17	Juan Sebastián Rivera	Colombia	91	93	98	94	98	89	563-3x	
18	Kevin Altamirano	Peru	94	95	95	95	90	93	562-9x	
19	Dave Seale	Barbados	93	96	95	93	91	93	561-13x	
20	Philip Elhage	Aruba	93	97	94	90	93	94	561-12x	
21	Douglas Gómez	Venezuela	95	96	92	91	90	96	560-7x	
22	Alejandro Delgado	Cuba	95	91	96	92	95	90	559-11x	
23	José Gutiérrez Diaz	El Salvador	91	90	93	94	95	95	558-13x	
24	Alex Peralta	Colombia	96	86	93	93	97	93	558-10x	
25	Ignacio Díaz	Chile	92	93	92	94	93	93	557-8x	
26	Claudio Frascone	Paraguay	88	91	92	95	94	95	555-13x	
27	Ricardo Valencia	Mexico	94	93	91	93	90	94	555-7x	
28	Jorge Pimentel	El Salvador	91	92	93	90	92	96	554-6x	
29	José Castillo	Independent Athletes Team	91	91	93	94	91	92	552-8x	
30	Javier Medina	Puerto Rico	92	90	93	89	93	94	551-10x	
31	Iván Cruz	Argentina	93	95	93	94	86	90	551-8x	
32	Edwin Barbereba	Nicaragua	90	93	90	91	92	93	549-11x	
33	Juan Campos	Panama	92	87	88	90	95	88	540-7x	

=== Final ===
The results were as follows:

Rank	Athlete	Country	1st Stage		2nd Stage							Total	Notes
1st place, gold medalist(s)	Tugrul Ozer	Canada	48.7; 10.2; 10.5; 9.7; 9.3; 9.0	98.6; 10.3; 10.2; 9.8; 9.7; 9.9	118.5; 10.2; 9.7	138.8; 10.7; 9.6	160.2; 10.7; 10.7	180.1; 9.8; 10.1	200.3; 10.1; 10.1	221.0; 10.6; 10.1	9.8; 9.7	240.5	FPR
2nd place, silver medalist(s)	James Hall	United States	49.6; 10.3; 8.8; 10.0; 10.4; 10.1	100.5; 10.5; 10.4; 9.9; 10.3; 9.8	119.1; 9.7; 8.9	139.6; 10.4; 10.1	159.6; 10.0; 10.0	180.8; 10.4; 10.8	200.8; 9.2; 10.8	218.9; 9.4; 8.7	10.2; 10.2	239.3	
3rd place, bronze medalist(s)	Felipe Wu	Brazil	48.7; 10.2; 9.5; 10.0; 8.9; 10.1	96.7; 10.0; 9.1; 9.9; 9.6; 9.4	116.1; 9.5; 9.9	135.7; 10.2; 9.4	155.4; 10.3; 9.4	176.0; 10.6; 10.0	195.2; 9.8; 9.4	10.1; 10.1		215.3	
4	Philipe Chateaubrian	Brazil	49.1; 10.7; 10.2; 10.6; 9.5; 8.1	96.7; 9.0; 9.5; 9.2; 9.2; 10.7	114.7; 9.2; 8.8	135.5; 10.2; 10.6	155.6; 9.5; 10.6	175.6; 10.9; 9.1	9.5; 7.5			192.6	
5	Nickolaus Mowrer	United States	50.8; 10.1; 10.0; 10.0; 10.0; 10.7	100.4; 9.1; 10.3; 9.9; 10.5; 9.8	118.1; 8.4; 9.3	137.9; 9.6; 10.2	157.1; 8.4; 10.8	9.2; 9.2				175.5	
6	Fernando Pozo	Ecuador	47.4; 9.7; 9.3; 10.2; 8.3; 9.9	95.7; 10.1; 9.3; 10.1; 9.7; 9.1	114.3; 10.6; 8.0	133.2; 9.2; 9.7	10.5; 9.2					152.9	
7	Jorge Potrillé	Cuba	46.9; 8.7; 9.2; 8.3; 10.7; 10.0	94.5; 10.5; 8.6; 9.6; 10.2; 8.7	115.1; 10.6; 10.0	8.9; 7.4						131.4	
8	Albino Jiménes	Independent Athletes Team	48.3; 9.0; 10.2; 9.0; 9.4; 10.7	94.2; 9.3; 9.3; 7.7; 9.8; 9.8	10.6; 9.4							114.2	
