= Sailing at the 2023 Pan American Games – Lightning =

Lightning at the 2023 Pan American Games
- Venue: Cofradia Nautica del Pacifico
- Dates: October 30 - November 4
- Competitors: 24 from 8 nations

Medalists
Gold medal	Allan Terhune Jr. Madeline Baldridge; Sarah Chin	United States
Silver medal	Pedro Robles; Paula Hermán; Carmina Malsch	Chile
Bronze medal	Javier Conte; María Trinidad Silva; Martina Silva	Argentina

The Lightning competition of the sailing events at the 2023 Pan American Games in Santiago was held from October 30 to November 4 at the Cofradia Nautica del Pacifico.

Points were assigned based on the finishing position in each race (1 for first, 2 for second, etc.). The points were totaled from the top 9 results of the first 10 races, with lower totals being better. If a team was disqualified or did not complete the race, 9 points were assigned for that race (as there were 8 teams in this competition). The top 5 teams at that point competed in the final race, with placings counting double for final score. The team with the lowest total score won.

Allan Terhune Jr., Madeline Baldridge and Sarah Chin from the United States secured the gold medal with seven wins in eleven races, making it the first title for the country in the class since 1999. The home athletes Pedro Robles, Paula Hermán and Carmina Malsch won the silver medal, followed by Javier Conte, María Trinidad Silva and Martina Silva from Argentina. Conte, who was the then two-time class champion, managed to achieve another top-3 finish.

== Schedule ==
All times are (UTC-3).

Date	Time	Round
October 30, 2023	12:07	Races 1, 2 and 3
October 31, 2023	13:00	Races 4, 5 and 6
November 2, 2023	15:22	Races 7 and 8
November 3, 2023	13:00	Races 9 and 10
November 4, 2023	14:00	Medal race

== Results ==
The results were as below.
Race M is the medal race.

Rank	Athlete	Nation	Race											Total Points	Net Points
Rank	Athlete	Nation	1	2	3	4	5	6	7	8	9	10	M	Total Points	Net Points
1st place, gold medalist(s)	Allan Terhune Jr. Madeline Baldridge; Sarah Chin	United States	2	1	2	1	1	2	1	3	1	1	2	17	14
2nd place, silver medalist(s)	Pedro Robles; Paula Hermán; Carmina Malsch	Chile	3	3	1	3	3	1	3	(5)	3	3	4	32	27
3rd place, bronze medalist(s)	Javier Conte; María Trinidad Silva; Martina Silva	Argentina	1	4	(6)	5	4	3	2	2	2	4	6	39	33
4	Luke Ramsay; Rachel Green; Jessica Hirschbold	Canada	6	2	3	2	2	5	(9); DSQ	1	4	6	8	48	39
5	Juan Daniel Bonifaz; Cláudia Barbieri; María Gracia Trivelli	Peru	5	5	4	(7)	5	7	4	7	7	2	10	63	56
6	Jonathan Martinetti; Alisson Zambrano; Moira Velásquez	Ecuador	4	(7)	5	4	7	4	6	6	6	7	—	56	49
7	Thomas Sumner; Larissa Juk; Ana Barbachan	Brazil	(7)	6	7	6	6	6	5	4	5	5	—	57	50
8	Yamil Fuentes; Dismary Bonillo; Andrea Fuentes	Colombia	(8)	8	8	8	8	8	7	8	8	8	—	79	71
