= Sport climbing at the 2023 Pan American Games – Men's speed =

Men's speed at the 2023 Pan American Games
- Venue: Cerrillos Park Climbing Walls
- Dates: October 22
- Competitors: 16 from 9 nations
- Winning time: 5.37

Medalists
Gold medal	Samuel Watson	United States
Silver medal	Noah Bratschi	United States
Bronze medal	Carlos Granja	Ecuador

The men's competition speed climbing event at the 2023 Pan American Games was held on October 22 at the Cerrillos Park Climbing Walls in Santiago, Chile.

== Schedule ==
Date	Time	Round
October 22, 2023	19:00	Qualification
October 22, 2023	19:55	Finals

== Results ==
=== Qualification ===
Rank	Climber	Nation	Lane A	Lane B	Time
1	Samuel Watson	United States	~~6.44~~	5.38	5.38
2	Carlos Granja	Ecuador	5.59	~~5.84~~	5.59
3	John Brosler	United States	~~5.70~~	5.69	5.69
4	Ethan Flynn-Pitcher	Canada	~~5.78~~	5.77	5.77
5	Michael Finn-Henry	Canada	5.83	~~7.42~~	5.83
6	Gustavo Pérez	Venezuela	~~11.27~~	5.90	5.90
7	Dylan Le	Canada	5.97	~~6.77~~	5.97
8	Isaac Estevez	Ecuador	6.13	~~8.54~~	6.13
9	José Ledesma	Chile	6.28	~~6.41~~	6.28
10	Gabriel Cancel	Ecuador	~~7.18~~	6.29	6.29
11	Noah Bratschi	United States	~~6.58~~	6.56	6.56
12	Valentin Sternik	Argentina	~~6.95~~	6.76	6.76
13	Andrés Alencaster	Mexico	7.18	~~7.46~~	7.18
14	Pedro Egg	Brazil	7.42	FALL	7.42
15	Joaquín Tapia	Chile	~~9.40~~	8.73	8.73
16	Emilio Flores	Independent Athletes Team	~~10.83~~	10.75	10.75

=== Bracket ===
Round of 16
Samuel Watson (USA)	5.55
Emilio Flores (EAI)	10.61
Isaac Estevez (ECU)	5.85
José Ledesma (CHI)	6.22
Ethan Flynn-Pitcher (CAN)	5.71
Andrés Alencaster (MEX)	7.35
Michael Finn-Henry (CAN)	7.20
Valentín Sternik (ARG)	6.86
Carlos Granja (ECU)	5.74
Joaquín Tapia (CHI)	7.85
Dylan Le (CAN)	6.10
Gabriel Cancel (ECU)	6.56
John Brosler (USA)	7.67
Pedro Egg (BRA)	7.35
Gustavo Pérez (VEN)	10.27
Noah Bratschi (USA)	5.48

Quarterfinals
Samuel Watson (USA)	5.05
Isaac Estevez (ECU)	5.68
Ethan Flynn-Pitcher (CAN)	5.66
Valentín Sternik (ARG)	9.19
Carlos Granja (ECU)	5.57
Dylan Le (CAN)	5.84
Pedro Egg (BRA)	7.04
Noah Bratschi (USA)	5.47

Semifinals
Samuel Watson (USA)	5.32
Ethan Flynn-Pitcher (CAN)	FALL
Carlos Granja (ECU)	FALL
Noah Bratschi (USA)	5.37

Final
Samuel Watson (USA)	5.37
Noah Bratschi (USA)	5.96

=== Bronze medal match ===
Bronze medal match
Ethan Flynn-Pitcher (CAN)	5.59
Carlos Granja (ECU)	5.52
