= Tugrul Ozer =

Canadian sport shooter

Tugrul Özer
Personal information
- Full name: Tugrul Ozer
- Nationality: Canada
- Home town: Toronto, Ontario
Medal record
Men's air pistol
Representing Canada
Pan American Games
Gold medal – first place	2023 Santiago	10m air pistol

Tugrul Özer is a Canadian sport shooter. Özer won the gold medal in the men's 10-metre air pistol at the 2023 Pan American Games in Santiago. Tugrul set the Pan American Games Record on the way to his victory over James Hall in 2023 and secured a quota spot and his qualification to the 2024 Summer Olympics. Tugrul's 240.5 score in the final surpassed the previous 237.5 set by Cuba's Jorge Grau in 2019. Following his win he said that "It means a lot, really. There’s a lot of effort behind this performance. I’m very happy to have three prizes, happy to have the gold medal and the qualification for Paris. I plan to do better in Paris. It was a challenging competition."
