= Luisa Tejada =

Colombian breakdancer

Personal information
- Born: Luisa Fernanda Tejada Pulgarin Medellín, Colombia

Sport
- Country: Colombia
- Sport: Breakdancing
Medal record
Women's breakdancing
Representing Colombia
Pan American Games
Silver medal – second place	2023 Santiago	B-Girls
FUJIFILM INSTAX Undisputed Masters
Winner	2023 São Paulo	Solo Women

Luisa Fernanda Tejada Pulgarin, (Note: In this Spanish name, the first or paternal surname is Tejada and the second or maternal family name is Pulgarin.) also known as Luma and B-Girl Luma, is a Colombian breakdancer. She competed at the 2023 Pan American Games, winning the silver medal in the B-Girls event.
