= Ana Luiza Souza Lima =

Brazilian female sport shooter

Personal information
- Born: 26 December 1973 (age 52) Rio de Janeiro, Brazil

Sport
- Sport: Sport shooting
Medal record
Representing Brazil
Pan American Games
| Gold medal – first place | 2011 Guadalajara | 25m pistol |

Ana Luiza Souza Lima (born 26 December 1973) is a Brazilian female sport shooter. At the 2012 Summer Olympics, she competed in the Women's 10 metre air pistol and the Women's 25 metre pistol.
