= Carina García =

Bolivian sports shooter

Personal information
- Born: 3 January 1984 (age 42)

Sport
- Sport: Sports shooting

Carina García (born 3 January 1984) is a Bolivian sports shooter. She competed in the women's 10 metre air rifle event at the 2016 Summer Olympics.
