= Alejandra Zavala =

Mexican sport shooter

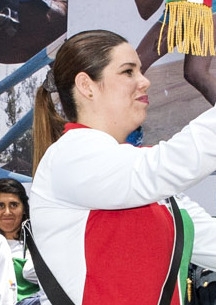
- Zavala at the 2018 Central American/Caribbean Games

Personal information
- Full name: Alejandra Zavala Vázquez
- Born: 16 June 1984 (age 42) Guadalajara, Mexico
- Height: 165 cm (5 ft 5 in)

Sport
- Country: Mexico
- Sport: Shooting
Medal record
Women's shooting
Representing Mexico
Pan American Games
Gold medal – first place	2023 Santiago	10 m air pistol
Gold medal – first place	2023 Santiago	25 m pistol
Silver medal – second place	2015 Toronto	10 m air pistol
Silver medal – second place	2023 Santiago	Mixed 10 m air pistol

Alejandra Zavala Vázquez (born 16 June 1984 in Guadalajara, Jalisco) is a Mexican female sport shooter. At the 2012 Summer Olympics, she competed in the Women's 10 metre air pistol.

Zavala was the standard-bearer for the 2018 Central American and Caribbean Games.
