= Noah Bratschi =

American rock climber (born 2000)

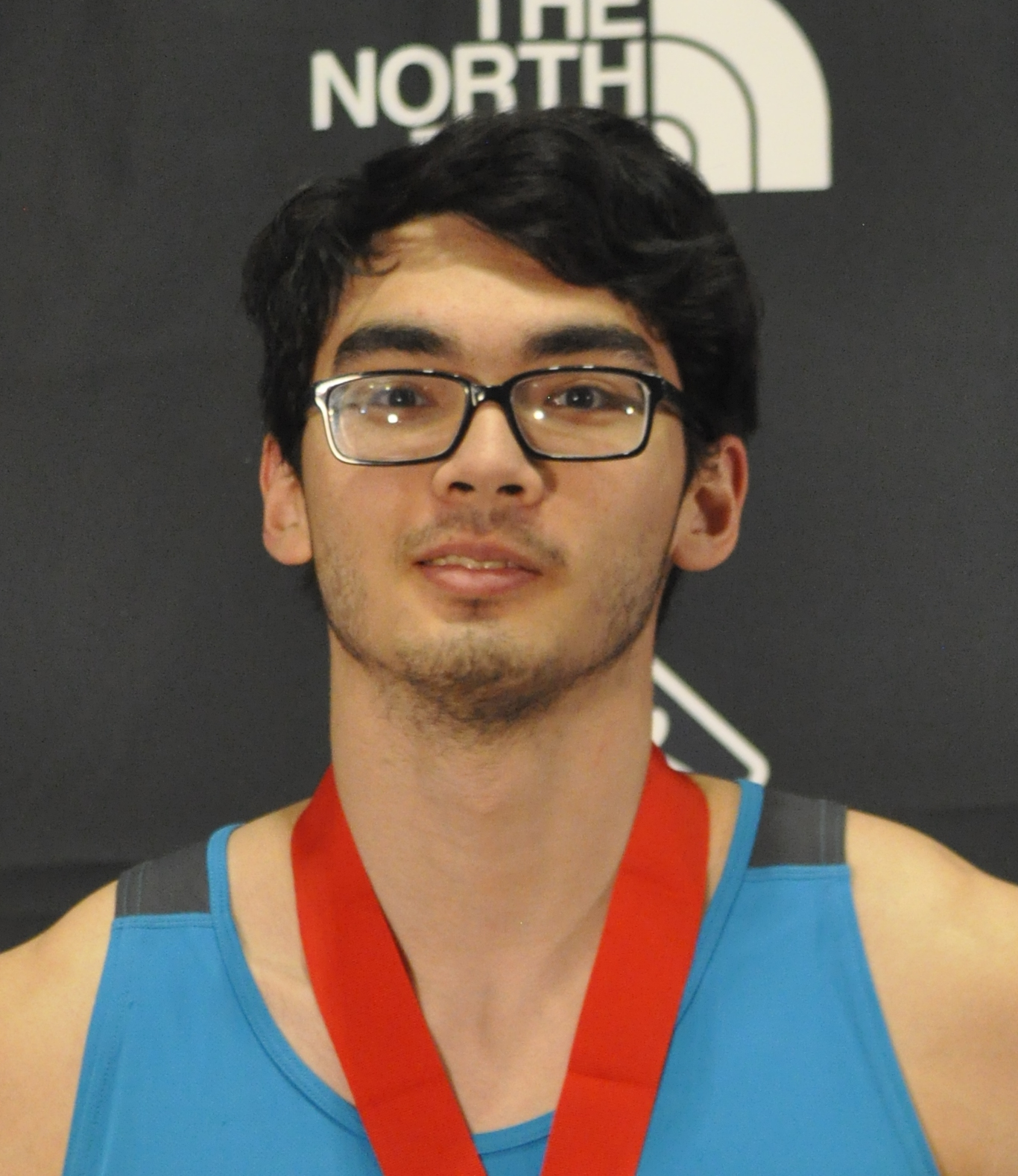
- Bratschi in 2019

Personal information
- Nationality: American
- Born: July 31, 2000 (age 26) Potomac, Maryland
- Height: 6 ft 1 in (185 cm)

Climbing career
- Type of climber: Speed climbing
Medal record
Men's competition climbing
Representing United States
Event	1st	2nd	3rd
World Championships	0	0	1
World Cup	0	2	0
World Championships
Bronze medal – third place	2021 Moscow	Speed
World Cup
Silver medal – second place	2022 Salt Lake City	Speed
Silver medal – second place	2024 Salt Lake City	Speed
Pan American Games
Silver medal – second place	2023 Santiago	Speed
USA Climbing Team Trials
Gold medal – first place	2024	Speed
World Youth Championships
Silver medal – second place	2018	Speed
Youth Pan American Championships
Silver medal – second place	2017	Speed
Youth National Championships
Gold medal – first place	2015	Speed
Gold medal – first place	2016	Speed
Gold medal – first place	2017	Speed
Gold medal – first place	2018	Speed
Silver medal – second place	2019	Speed

Noah Bratschi (born July 31, 2000) is an American professional rock climber who specializes in competition speed climbing and represents the United States at IFSC Climbing World Cups. He won the bronze medal at the 2021 International Federation of Sport Climbing (IFSC) World Championship in Moscow, Russia. Achieving this feat, he became the first American speed climber in thirty years (since 1991) to win a World Championship medal. Additionally, he made history as the first American to ever win a medal on the modern IFSC homologated speed climbing wall.

== Competition climbing career ==
At the 2026 USA Climbing National Championships held in Orlando, FL, Bratschi earned the silver medal and set a new competition best time of 5.06 seconds.

On May 20, 2022, at the IFSC World Cup in Salt Lake City, due to his silver medal performance, Bratschi achieved a historic milestone by becoming the first American male speed climber to earn a podium finish at a speed climbing World Cup.

At the 2023 Pan American Championships in Santiago, Chile, Bratschi earned a silver medal in this Olympic qualifying event. A minor error in the gold medal race cost him a spot on the 2024 US Olympic team. Bratschi was among the first climbers to compete in the 2024 inaugural Olympic Games Qualifier Series, which was held in Shanghai, China, and Budapest, Hungary.

At the 2021 USA Climbing Team Trial Invitationals, Bratschi set an American record in speed climbing. He was the 2022 North American Cup gold medalist, the silver medalist at the 2019 US Open National Championships and the bronze medalist at the 2022 US Open National Championships.

As an accomplished youth competitor, he won the silver medal at the 2018 IFSC World Youth Championships in Moscow, Russia, finished 4th at the 2017 IFSC World Youth Championships in Innsbruck, Austria and was the silver medalist at the 2017 Youth Pan American Championships in Montreal, Canada. He was the age group US Youth National Champion in 2015, 2016, 2017, 2018 and the 2019 silver medalist.
