= Alexis Lagan =

American sport shooter (born 1993)

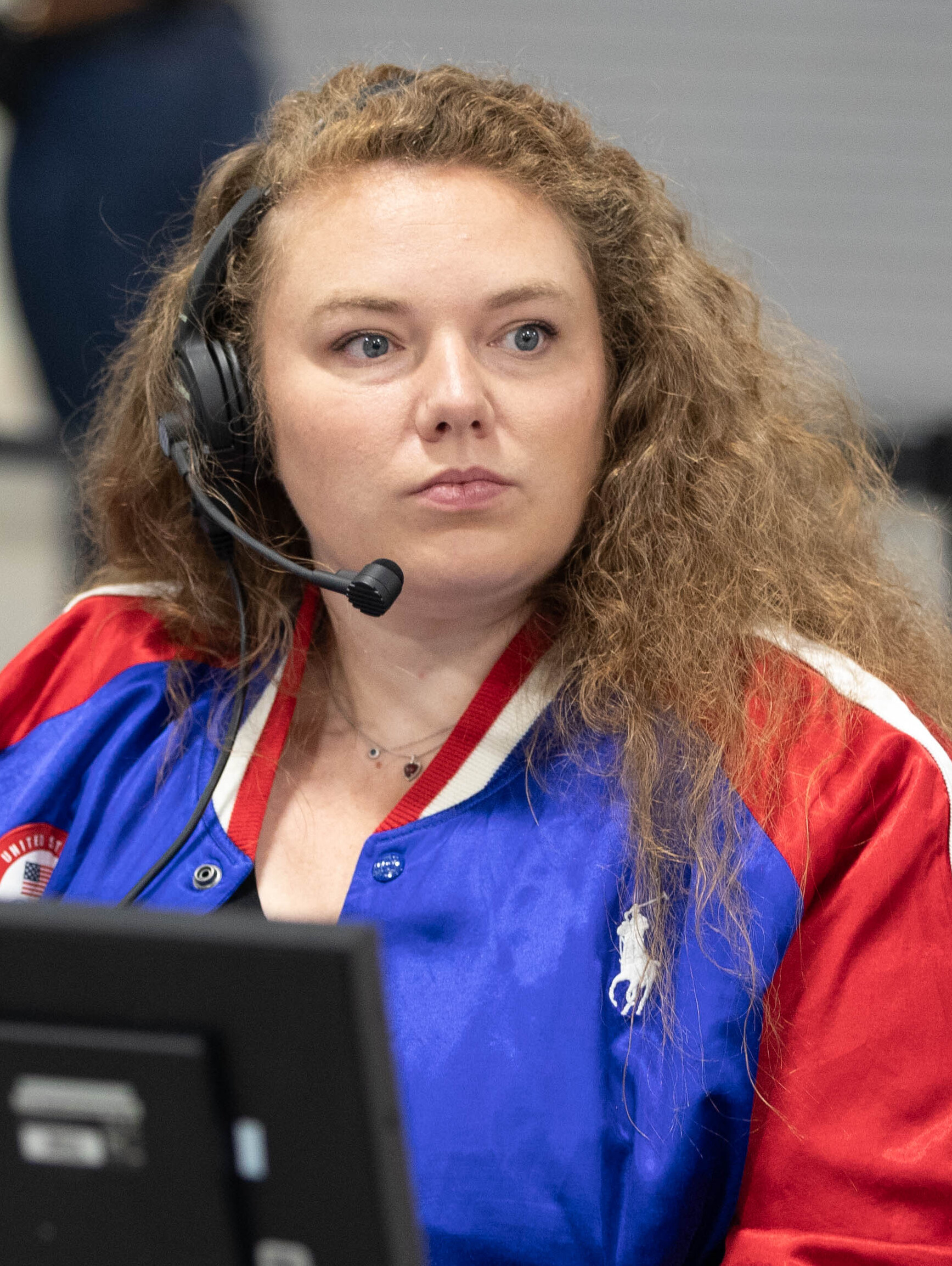
- Lagan in 2025

Personal information
- Nationality: American
- Born: January 25, 1993 (age 33) Boulder City, Nevada
- Education: University of Utah

Sport
- Country: United States
- Sport: Shooting
Medal record
Women's shooting
Representing United States
Pan American Games
Silver medal – second place	2023 Santiago	10 m air pistol
Bronze medal – third place	2023 Santiago	25 m pistol

Alexis Lagan (/ˈleɪɡən/ LAY-gən; born January 25, 1993) is an American sport shooter who qualified for the 2020 Summer Olympics after winning the 2020 U.S. Olympic Team Trials.
