= Diana Durango =

Ecuadorian sport shooter (born 1988)

Personal information
- Full name: Diana Durango Flores
- Born: 2 October 1988 (age 37) Quito, Ecuador

Sport
- Country: Ecuador
- Sport: Shooting
Medal record
Women's shooting
Representing Ecuador
Pan American Games
Silver medal – second place	2019 Lima	25 m pistol
Silver medal – second place	2023 Santiago	25 m pistol
Bronze medal – third place	2023 Santiago	10 m air pistol
South American Games
Gold medal – first place	2018 Cochabamba	25 m pistol
Silver medal – second place	2018 Cochabamba	10 m air pistol
Bronze medal – third place	2018 Cochabamba	Mixed 10 m air pistol

Diana Durango Flores (born 2 October 1988) is an Ecuadorian sport shooter. She won the silver medal in the women's 25 metres pistol event at the 2019 Pan American Games held in Lima, Peru. She also won two medals at the 2023 Pan American Games held in Santiago, Chile.

In 2011, she competed in the women's 10 metre air pistol and women's 25 metre pistol event at the Pan American Games in Guadalajara, Mexico without winning a medal.

She represented Ecuador at the 2020 Summer Olympics in Tokyo, Japan.
