= Lisa Emmert =

American sport shooter

Personal information
- Nationality: American
- Born: October 18, 1995 (age 30) Houghton, Michigan
- Education: Spring Arbor University

Sport
- Country: United States
- Sport: Shooting
Medal record
Women's shooting
Representing United States
Pan American Games
Bronze medal – third place	2023 Santiago	Mixed pairs air pistol

Lisa Emmert Traciak is an American sport shooter. She won the bronze medal in the 2023 Pan American Games in the Mixed pairs air pistol event.
