= Emma Misak =

Canadian breakdancer at Youth Olympics

Personal information
- Full name: Emma Patricia Misak
- Born: June 11, 2000 (age 26) Surrey, British Columbia, Canada

Sport
- Country: Canada
- Sport: Breakdancing
Medal record
Breakdancing
Representing Canada
Youth Olympic Games
Silver medal – second place	2018 Buenos Aires	B-Girls

Emma Patricia Misak (born June 11, 2000), also known as Emma, is a Canadian breakdancer. She competed at the 2018 Summer Youth Olympics in the dancesport competition, winning the silver medal in the B-Girls event.
