= James Hall (sport shooter) =

American sports shooter

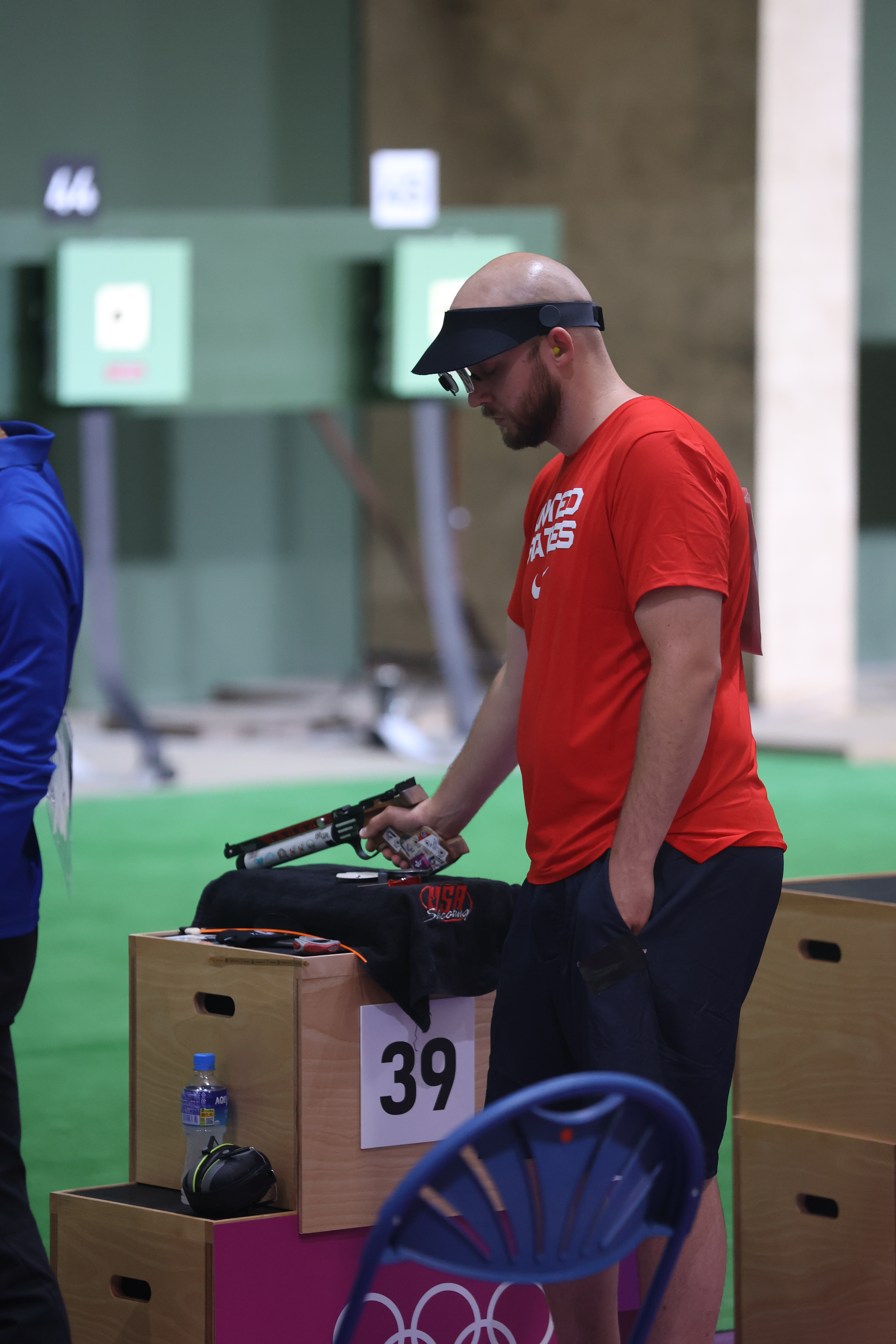
- Hall at the 2020 Summer Olympics

Personal information
- Born: November 18, 1983 (age 42) Alabaster, Alabama, United States
- Height: 183 cm (6 ft 0 in)
- Weight: 200.62 lb (91.00 kg; 14 st 4.62 lb)

Sport
- Sport: Sports shooting
- College team: Jacksonville State University
Medal record
Men's shooting
Representing United States
Pan American Games
Silver medal – second place	2023 Santiago	10 m air pistol

James Hall (born November 18, 1983) is an American sports shooter from Alabaster, Alabama. He competed in the men's 10 metre air pistol event at the 2020 Summer Olympics, where he ultimately placed 10th.
