= Adriana Rendón =

Colombian sport shooter (born 1971)

Personal information
- Full name: Adriana Lucia Rendón Martínez
- Born: September 16, 1971 (age 54) Bello, Antioquia

Sport
- Country: Colombia
- Sport: Shooting
- Event(s): 10 m air pistol (AP40); 25 m pistol (SP)
Medal record
Representing Colombia
Women's shooting
Event	1st	2nd	3rd
World Cup	0	1	1
Pan American Games	0	1	1
CAC Games	1	1	1
South American Games	0	1	0
Total	1	4	3
World Cup
Silver medal – second place	1996 Havana	10 m air pistol
Bronze medal – third place	1995 Havana	25 m pistol
Pan American Games
Silver medal – second place	1995 Mar del Plata	10 m air pistol team
Bronze medal – third place	1991 Havana	25 m pistol team
Central American and Caribbean Games
Gold medal – first place	2010 Mayagüez	25 m pistol team
Silver medal – second place	2010 Mayagüez	10 m air pistol team
Bronze medal – third place	2006 Cartagena	10 m air pistol team
South American Games
Silver medal – second place	2006 Buenos Aires	25 m pistol team

Adriana Rendón (born 16 September 1971 in Bello, Antioquia) is a Colombian sport shooter. She tied for 11th place in the women's 10 metre air pistol event and placed 32nd in the women's 25 metre pistol event at the 2000 Summer Olympics.
