= Sandra Uptagrafft =

American sport shooter

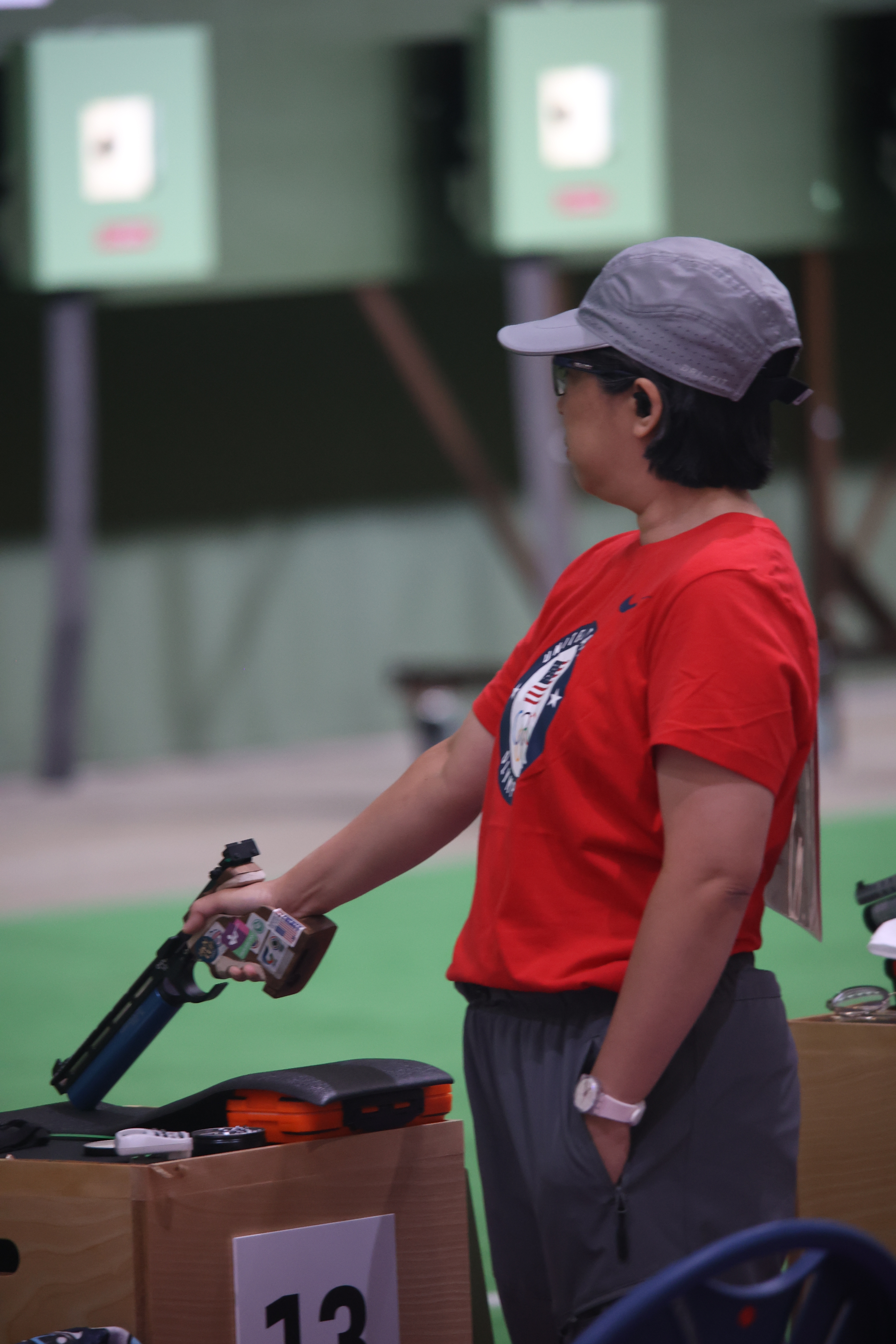
- Sandra Uptagrafft at the 2020 Summer Olympics

Personal information
- Nationality: American
- Born: April 12, 1971 (age 55) Singapore
- Height: 5 ft 1 in (155 cm)
- Weight: 116 lb (53 kg)

Sport
- Country: United States
- Sport: Shooting
- Club: U.S. Army WCAP
Medal record
Women's shooting
Representing the United States
Pan American Games
| Gold medal – first place | 2003 Santo Domingo | 25 m pistol |
| Gold medal – first place | 2007 Rio de Janeiro | 25 m pistol |
| Gold medal – first place | 2019 Lima | 25 m pistol |
| Silver medal – second place | 2011 Guadalajara | 25 m pistol |
| Silver medal – second place | 2015 Toronto | 25 m pistol |
| Bronze medal – third place | 2011 Guadalajara | 10 m air pistol |

Sandra Uptagrafft (born April 12, 1971 in Singapore) is an American sport shooter. At the 2012 Summer Olympics, she competed in the Women's 10 metre air pistol, and finished in 28th place. She also competed in the Women's 25 metre pistol event and also finished 28th in that. She has won gold and silver medals in the Pan American Games.

She represented the United States at the 2020 Summer Olympics.

== Personal life ==
Uptagrafft graduated from Beverly Hills High School in 1989 and from Troy State University in 1998. She is married to fellow sports shooter Eric Uptagrafft and is based in Phenix City, Alabama. She is a Warrant Officer in the US Army Reserves.
