= Maribel Pineda =

Venezuelan sport shooter

Personal information
- Born: 29 April 1980 (age 46) Valencia, Venezuela

Sport
- Sport: Sport shooting
Medal record
Representing Venezuela
Pan American Games
Silver medal – second place	2011 Guadalajara	10m air pistol
Bronze medal – third place	2011 Guadalajara	25m pistol

Maribel Piñeda Calzadilla (born 29 April 1980) is a Venezuelan sport shooter.

== Career ==
At the 2012 Summer Olympics, she competed in the Women's 10 metre air pistol and the Women's 25 metre pistol.
