= Surfing at the 2023 Pan American Games – Men's SUP race =

Men's SUP race at the 2023 Pan American Games
- Venue: Punta de Lobos beach
- Dates: October 30
- Competitors: 10 from 10 nations

Medalists
Gold medal	Connor Baxter	United States
Silver medal	Itzel Delgado	Peru
Bronze medal	Santino Basaldella	Argentina

The men's SUP race competition of the surfing events at the 2023 Pan American Games was held on October 30 at Punta de Lobos beach in Pichilemu, Chile.

== Schedule ==
Date	Time	Round
October 30, 2023	14:23	Final

== Results ==
The results during the elimination rounds were as follows:

Rank	Name	Nationality	Time	Notes
1st place, gold medalist(s)	Connor Baxter	United States	12:49.9	
2nd place, silver medalist(s)	Itzel Delgado	Peru	13:25.2	
3rd place, bronze medalist(s)	Santino Basaldella	Argentina	13:59.4	
4	David Leão	Brazil	15:19.2	
5	Ricardo Ávila	Puerto Rico	15:51.8	
6	Carlo Camacho	Costa Rica	17:42.9	
7	Mike Darbyshire	Canada	19:53.9	
8	Lukas Rodríguez	Uruguay	20:11.6	
9	José Ponce	Chile	22:01.9	
	Edonays Caballero	Panama	DSQ	
