= Peru at the 2023 Pan American Games =

- IOC code: PER
- NOC: Peruvian Olympic Committee

in Santiago, Chile 20 October 2023 – 5 November 2023
- Competitors: 216 in 33 sports
- Flag bearers (opening): Nicolás Pacheco & María Fernanda Reyes
- Flag bearers (closing): Diego Elías & Kimberly García
- Medals Ranked 9th: Gold 10 Silver 6 Bronze 16 Total 32

Pan American Games appearances (overview)
- 1951; 1955; 1959; 1963; 1967; 1971; 1975; 1979; 1983; 1987; 1991; 1995; 1999; 2003; 2007; 2011; 2015; 2019; 2023; 2027

Peru competed at the 2023 Pan American Games in Santiago, Chile from October 20 to November 5, 2023. This was Peru's 18th appearance at the Pan American Games, having competed at every Games since 1951, except for the second edition in 1955.

Sport shooter Nicolás Pacheco and surfer María Fernanda Reyes were the country's flagbearers during the opening ceremony. Athlete Gladys Tejeda was initially selected as flagbearer but decided to step aside at the last moment in order to focus on her marathon competition scheduled for October 22, two days later. Meanwhile, squash athlete Diego Elías and race walker Kimberly García were the country's flagbearers during the closing ceremony.

== Medalists ==
The following Peruvian competitors won medals at the games. In the by discipline sections below, medalists' names are bolded.

Medal	Name	Sport	Event	Date
Gold	Cristhian Pacheco	Athletics	Men's marathon	October 22
Gold	Hugo Ruiz	Cycling	Men's omnium	October 24
Gold	Kimberly García	Athletics	Women's 20 km walk	October 29
Gold	Benoit Clemente	Surfing	Men's longboard	October 30
Gold	María Fernanda Reyes	Surfing	Women's longboard	October 30
Gold	Lucca Mesinas	Surfing	Men's shortboard	October 30
Gold	Luz Mery Rojas	Athletics	Women's 10,000 metres	October 30
Gold	Diego Elías	Squash	Men's singles	November 1
Gold	Stefano Peschiera	Sailing	Men's ILCA 7	November 4
Gold	Caterina Romero	Sailing	Women's sunfish	November 4
Silver	Ángelo Caro	Roller sports	Men's street	October 21
Silver	Itzel Delgado	Surfing	Men's SUP race	October 30
Silver	María Luisa Doig	Fencing	Women's épée	November 1
Silver	Kimberly García; César Rodríguez	Athletics	Race walk mixed team	November 4
Silver	Jean Paul de Trazegnies	Sailing	Men's sunfish	November 4
Silver	Alexandra Grande	Karate	Women's 61 kg	November 4
Bronze	Hugo del Castillo	Taekwondo	Men's poomsae individual	October 21
Bronze	Cristian Morales	Shooting	Men's 10 metre air rifle	October 21
Bronze	Luis Bardalez	Weightlifting	Men's 61 kg	October 21
Bronze	Luis Ostos	Athletics	Men's marathon	October 22
Bronze	Gladys Tejeda	Athletics	Women's marathon	October 22
Bronze	Daniella Borda	Shooting	Women's skeet	October 22
Bronze	Nicolás Pacheco	Shooting	Men's skeet	October 22
Bronze	Inés Castillo; José Guevara	Badminton	Mixed doubles	October 24
Bronze	Evelyn Inga⁣⁣	Athletics	Women's 20 km walk	October 29
Bronze	Eriberto Gutiérrez⁣⁣	Canoeing	Men's slalom kayak cross	October 29
Bronze	Vania Torres	Surfing	Women's SUP surf	October 30
Bronze	Miguel Tudela	Surfing	Men's shortboard	October 30
Bronze	Camila Figueroa	Judo	Women's 78 kg	October 30
Bronze	Diego Elías; Alonso Escudero	Squash	Men's doubles	November 2
Bronze	Diego Elías; Alonso Escudero; Rafael Gálvez	Squash	Men's team	November 4
Bronze	Nilton Soto	Wrestling	Men's Greco-Roman 67 kg	November 4

Medals by sport
Sport	1st place, gold medalist(s)	2nd place, silver medalist(s)	3rd place, bronze medalist(s)	Total
Athletics	3	1	3	**7**
Surfing	3	1	2	**6**
Sailing	2	1	0	**3**
Squash	1	0	2	**3**
Cycling	1	0	0	**1**
Fencing	0	1	0	**1**
Karate	0	1	0	**1**
Roller sports	0	1	0	**1**
Shooting	0	0	3	**3**
Badminton	0	0	1	**1**
Canoeing	0	0	1	**1**
Judo	0	0	1	**1**
Taekwondo	0	0	1	**1**
Weightlifting	0	0	1	**1**
Wrestling	0	0	1	**1**
Total	10	6	16	32

== Competitors ==
The following is the list of number of competitors (per gender) participating at the games per sport/discipline.

Sport	Men	Women	Total
Archery	1	2	3
Athletics	8	10	18
Badminton	3	3	6
Basque pelota	5	2	7
Boxing	1	1	2
Breaking	0	2	2
Canoeing	4	3	7
Cycling	5	2	7
Diving	1	3	4
Equestrian	1	0	1
Fencing	2	4	6
Field hockey	16	0	16
Golf	2	2	4
Gymnastics	2	2	4
Judo	3	4	7
Karate	1	4	5
Modern pentathlon	2	1	3
Roller sports	2	1	3
Rowing	7	3	10
Sailing	4	8	12
Shooting	9	7	16
Softball	0	16	16
Sport climbing	1	1	2
Squash	3	0	3
Surfing	5	5	10
Swimming	4	8	12
Table tennis	3	1	4
Taekwondo	2	4	6
Tennis	3	3	6
Volleyball	0	2	2
Water skiing	0	2	2
Weightlifting	3	3	6
Wrestling	2	2	4
Total	105	111	216

== Archery ==
Peru qualified three archers during the 2022 Pan American Archery Championships and the 2023 Copa Merengue.

Athlete	Event	Ranking Round		Round of 32	Round of 16	Quarterfinals	Semifinals	Final / BM	Rank
Athlete	Event	Score	Seed	Opposition Score	Opposition Score	Opposition Score	Opposition Score	Opposition Score	Rank
Daniel Velarde	Men's individual recurve	617	28	Williams (USA); L 2–6	Did not advance				
Alexandra Zavala	Women's individual recurve	577	28	Rendón (COL); L 0–6	Did not advance				
Beatriz Hurtado⁣	Women's individual compound	671	15	—N/a	Ruiz (USA); L 141–149	Did not advance			
Daniel Velarde; Alexandra Zavala	Mixed team recurve	1194	14	—N/a		D'Almeida / Machado (BRA); L 0–6	Did not advance		

== Athletics ==
Peru qualified a team of 18 athletes (eight men and ten women).

Key

- Note–Ranks given for track events are within the athlete's heat only
- Q = Qualified for the next round
- q = Qualified for the next round as a fastest loser
- Bye = Athlete not required to compete in round

Men

Track & road events

Athlete	Event	Semifinal		Final	
Athlete	Event	Time	Rank	Time	Rank
Marco Vilca	800 m	1:49.55	5	Did not advance	
Julio Palomino	3000 m steeplechase	—N/a		8:48.50	5
José Luis Rojas	10,000 m	—N/a		30:11.02	9
Cristhian Pacheco	Marathon	—N/a		2:11:14	1st place, gold medalist(s)
Luis Ostos	Marathon	—N/a		2:12:34	3rd place, bronze medalist(s)
Luis Henry Campos	20 km walk	—N/a		1:22:03	8
César Rodriguez	20 km walk	—N/a		1:20:49	7

Field events

Athlete	Event	Result	Rank
José Luis Mandros	Long jump	7.70	5

Women

Track & road events

Athlete	Event	Semifinal		Final	
Athlete	Event	Time	Rank	Time	Rank
Anita Poma⁣⁣	1500 m	—N/a		4:14.44	5
Verónica Huacasi⁣	3000 m steeplechase	—N/a		10:10.90	8
Sofía Mamani⁣⁣	10,000 m	—N/a		DNF	
Luz Mery Rojas	10,000 m	—N/a		33:12.99	1st place, gold medalist(s)
Lizaida Valdivia⁣⁣	10,000 m	—N/a		33:18.21	4
Aydee Loayza⁣	Marathon	—N/a		2:30:55	4
Gladys Tejeda⁣	Marathon	—N/a		2:30:39	3rd place, bronze medalist(s)
Kimberly García	20 km walk	—N/a		No result	1st place, gold medalist(s)
Evelyn Inga⁣⁣	20 km walk	—N/a		No result	3rd place, bronze medalist(s)

Field events

Athlete	Event	Result	Rank
Ximena Zorrilla⁣	Hammer throw	59.99	8

1. Due to a measurement issue the race's time results were annulled.

Mixed

Track & road events

Athlete	Event	Semifinal		Final	
Athlete	Event	Time	Rank	Time	Rank
Kimberly García; César Rodriguez	Race walk mixed team	—N/a		3:01.14	2nd place, silver medalist(s)

== Badminton ==
Peru qualified a team of six athletes (three men and three women).

Men

Athlete	Event	Round of 32	Round of 16	Quarterfinals	Semifinals	Final / BM	
Athlete	Event	Opposition Result	Opposition Result	Opposition Result	Opposition Result	Opposition Result	Rank
Adriano Viale	Singles	Marcano (TTO); W (21–9, 21–8)	Lee Hsieh (PAR); W (21–12, 21–12)	Cordón (EAI); L (15–21, 9–21)	Did not advance		
José Guevara; Diego Mini	Doubles	—N/a	Castillo / Montoya (MEX); L (16–21, 11–21)	Did not advance			

Women

Athlete	Event	Round of 64	Round of 32	Round of 16	Quarterfinals	Semifinals	Final / BM	
Athlete	Event	Opposition Result	Opposition Result	Opposition Result	Opposition Result	Opposition Result	Opposition Result	Rank
Inés Castillo	Singles	Bye	Londoño (COL); W (21–8, 21–8)	Montre (CHI); W (21–8, 21–10)	Chan (CAN); L (17–21, 10–21)	Did not advance		
Fernanda Saponara	Singles	Bye	Palacios (EAI); W (21–10, 21–9)	Gaitán (MEX); L (9–21, 20–22)	Did not advance			
Inés Castillo; Paula La Torre Regal	Doubles	—N/a		Centeno / Hernández (ESA); W (21–10, 21–12)	Choi / Wu (CAN); L (9–21, 9–21)	Did not advance		

Mixed

Athlete	Event	Round of 32	Round of 16	Quarterfinals	Semifinals	Final / BM	
Athlete	Event	Opposition Result	Opposition Result	Opposition Result	Opposition Result	Opposition Result	Rank
Diego Mini; Paula La Torre Regal	Doubles	Montre / Bahamondez (CHI); W (21–17, 21–11)	Gai / Chiu (USA); L (5–21, 6–21)	Did not advance			
Inés Castillo; José Guevara	Doubles	Centeno / Alas (ESA); W (21–14, 21–14)	Ortiz / Bencomo (CUB); W (21–17, 21–23, 21–12)	A. Oliva / N. Oliva (ARG); W (21–13, 21–9)	Lindeman / Wu (CAN); L (10–21, 11–21)	Did not advance	3rd place, bronze medalist(s)

== Basque pelota ==
Peru qualified a team of seven athletes (five men and two women) through the 2023 Pan American Basque Pelota Tournament.

Men

Athlete	Event	Preliminary round					Semifinal	Final / BM	
Athlete	Event	Opposition Score	Opposition Score	Opposition Score	Opposition Score	Rank	Opposition Score	Opposition Score	Rank
André Bellido; Reneé Escapa	Doubles trinquete rubber ball	Rodríguez / García (MEX); L 0–2	Andreasen / Villegas (ARG); L 0–2	Pelua / Pintos (URU); L 0–2	Stabón / Romero (CHI); L 0–2	5	Did not advance		
Gonzalo Bezada; David Yupanqui	Doubles frontenis	Cardozo / García (ARG); L 1–2	Cruz / Olvera (MEX); L 0–2	Espinoza / Espinoza (USA); L 0–2	González / García (CHI); L 0–2	5	Did not advance		
Kevin Quinto	Frontball	Abreu (CUB); L 0–2	Otheguy (BRA); L 0–2	Mateos (USA); W 2–1	—N/a	3	Did not advance		

Women

Athlete	Event	Preliminary round					Semifinal	Final / BM	
Athlete	Event	Opposition Score	Opposition Score	Opposition Score	Opposition Score	Rank	Opposition Score	Opposition Score	Rank
Mía Rodríguez; Nathaly Paredes	Doubles frontenis	Borges / Rangel (VEN); L 0–2	Plácito / Cepeda (MEX); L 0–2	Muñoz / Bozzo (CHI); W 2–0	Darriba / Durán (CUB); L 1–2	5	Did not advance		

== Boxing ==
Peru qualified two boxers (one per gender).

Athlete	Event	Round of 32	Round of 16	Quarterfinal	Semifinal	Final	
Athlete	Event	Opposition Result	Opposition Result	Opposition Result	Opposition Result	Opposition Result	Rank
Leodan Pezo	Men's –63.5 kg	Amaya (ARG); L RSC-I R1	Did not advance				
Daisy Bamberger	Women's –57 kg	—N/a	Bye	Romeu (BRA); L 0–5	Did not advance		

== Breaking ==
Peru qualified two female breakdancers through the WDSF World Rankings.

Athlete	Nickname	Event	Round robin group				Quarterfinal	Semifinal	Final / BM	
Athlete	Nickname	Event	Opposition Score	Opposition Score	Opposition Score	Rank	Opposition Score	Opposition Score	Opposition Score	Rank
Lourdes Huachuhuillca⁣	Monchi	B-Girls	Abril (ARG); L 0–2	La Vix (USA); L 0–2	Swami (MEX); L 0–2	4	Did not advance			
Tiara Carpio⁣	Tiara	B-Girls	Lakshmi Hop (ECU); L 0–2	Tiff (CAN); L 0–2	Emma (CAN); L 0–2	4	Did not advance			

== Canoeing ==
=== Slalom ===
Peru qualified a total of three slalom athletes (two men and one woman).

Athlete	Event	Preliminary round			Repechage	Semifinal		Final	
Athlete	Event	Run 1	Run 2	Rank	Rank	Time	Rank	Time	Rank
Eriberto Gutiérrez	Men's K-1	88.33	~~89.74~~	8	—N/a	Did not advance			
Eriberto Gutiérrez	Men's EK-1	58.55	—N/a	13 Q	—N/a	2 Q		3rd place, bronze medalist(s)	
John Hunter Rodríguez	Men's C-1	~~131.31~~	110.63	9	—N/a	Did not advance			
John Hunter Rodríguez	Men's EK-1	64.59	—N/a	15	—N/a	Did not advance			
Lenny Ramírez	Women's K-1	123.19	~~174.31~~	7 Q	—N/a	195.38	6 Q	402.00	6
Lenny Ramírez	Women's EK-1	68.55	—N/a	15 q	3	Did not advance			

=== Sprint ===
Peru qualified a total of 4 sprint athletes (two men and two women).

Athlete	Event	Heat		Semifinal		Final A/B	
Athlete	Event	Time	Rank	Time	Rank	Time	Rank
Colin Portocarrero	Men's C-1 1000 m	4:51.97	6 SF	5:06.44	8 FB	4:45.60	11
Esteven Hidalgo	Men's K-1 1000 m	4:02.67	8 SF	4:00.75	5 FB	3:54.96	12
Kyara Vargas	Women's K-1 500 m	2:25.63	7 SF	2:26.86	5 FB	2:25.84	13
Kyara Vargas⁣ Diana Gomringer	Women's K-2 500 m	2:19.48	5 SF	2:18.59	5 FB	2:11.33	9

== Cycling ==
Peru qualified a total of 7 cyclists (five men and two women).

=== BMX ===
Peru qualified three cyclists in BMX race through the UCI World Ranking of Nations. Micaela Ramírez was named in the list presented by the Peruvian Olympic Committee for Pan American Games, however, she was eventually not included in the final entry list for BMX racing event.

Freestyle

Athlete	Event	Seeding		Final	
Athlete	Event	Points	Rank	Points	Rank
Job Montañez	Men's	40.17	9	Did not advance	
María Victoria Rocha	Women's	27.00	6	Did not advance	

Racing

Athlete	Event	Ranking round		Quarterfinal		Semifinal		Final	
Athlete	Event	Time	Rank	Points	Rank	Time	Rank	Time	Rank
Francisco Mamani	Men's	34.250	16 Q	13	5	Did not advance			
André Lacroix	Men's	34.740	18 Q	15	5	Did not advance			

=== Mountain biking ===
Athlete	Event	Time	Rank
Alexander Urbina	Men's cross-country	1:25:47	13

=== Road ===
Athlete	Event	Time	Rank
Hugo Ruiz	Men's road race	3:46:08	11

=== Track ===
Peru qualified a male track cyclist.

Omnium

Athlete	Event	Scratch race		Tempo race		Elimination race		Points race		Total	
Athlete	Event	Points	Rank	Points	Rank	Points	Rank	Points	Rank	Points	Rank
Hugo Ruiz	Men's	20	11	36	3	36	3	33	1	125	1st place, gold medalist(s)

== Diving ==
Peru qualified a team of 4 divers (one man and three women).

Men

Athlete	Event	Preliminary		Final	
Athlete	Event	Points	Rank	Points	Rank
Jesús Liranzo	1 m springboard	348.15	5 Q	361.45	5
Jesús Liranzo	3 m springboard	Did not start			
Jesús Liranzo	10 m platform	Did not start			

Women

Athlete	Event	Preliminary		Final	
Athlete	Event	Points	Rank	Points	Rank
Ana Ricci	1 m springboard	216.00	9 Q	216.65	11
Mayte Salinas	1 m springboard	156.60	15	Did not advance	
Pamela Reyes	3 m springboard	144.20	17	Did not advance	
Ana Ricci	3 m springboard	227.15	14	Did not advance	
Mayte Salinas	3 m springboard	Did not start			
Pamela Reyes	10 m platform	183.45	16	Did not advance	
Ana Ricci; Mayte Salinas	3 m synchronized springboard	—N/a		219.00	7

== Equestrian ==
Peru qualified a male equestrian.

=== Jumping ===
Athlete	Horse	Event	Qualification								Final					
Athlete	Horse	Event	Round 1		Round 2-1		Round 2-2		Total		Round A		Round B		Total	
Athlete	Horse	Event	Faults	Rank	Faults	Rank	Faults	Rank	Faults	Rank	Faults	Rank	Faults	Rank	Faults	Rank
Alonso Valdez Prado⁣	Acuero	Individual	3.52	11	24	37	4	=16	31.52	28 Q	16	19	Did not advance		47.52	21

== Fencing ==
Peru qualified a team of six fencers (two men and four women) through the 2022 Pan American Fencing Championships in Ascuncion, Paraguay.

Athlete	Event	Pool Round		Round of 16	Quarterfinals	Semifinals	Final	
Athlete	Event	Victories	Seed	Opposition Score	Opposition Score	Opposition Score	Opposition Score	Rank
Eduardo García Biel⁣	Men's épée	1V–5D	17	Did not advance				
Fabián Huapaya	Men's sabre	2V–4D	14 Q	Gordon (CAN); L 11–15	Did not advance			
María Luisa Doig	Women's épée	3V–2D	6 Q	Jaramillo (COL); W 15–9	Viveros (PAR); W 15–10	Xiao (CAN); W 15–10	Di Tella (ARG); L 9–15	2nd place, silver medalist(s)
Paola Gil	Women's foil	1V–4D	15 Q	Kiefer (USA); L 6–15	Did not advance			
Kusi Rosales	Women's foil	3V–2D	9 Q	Hernández (MEX); L 11–12	Did not advance			
Paola Gil; Kusi Rosales; Mariana Soriano	Women's team foil	—N/a			United States; L 15–45	5th–8th place classification Chile; L 27–45	Seventh place match Colombia; W 45–29	7

== Field hockey ==
Summary

Team	Event	Group stage				Semifinal	Final / BM / Pl.	
Team	Event	Opposition Result	Opposition Result	Opposition Result	Rank	Opposition Result	Opposition Result	Rank
Peru men	Men's tournament	Chile; L 0–15	Mexico; L 1–6	Argentina; L 0–22	4	5th–8th place classification Brazil; L 1–8	Seventh place match Trinidad and Tobago; L 0–10	8

=== Men's tournament ===
Peru qualified a men's team (of 16 athletes) after participating at the 2022 Pan American Cup.

Roster

- Luis De Martis
- Rodrigo Díaz
- Adrián Huanca
- Ernesto Costa
- Gabriel Pezo
- Darwin Chávez
- Camilo Cotrina
- Gianfranco Curo
- Manuel Barco
- Angelov Contreras
- Guillermo Power
- Daniel Rehder
- Jefferson Arcos
- Adrian Huacchillo
- Diego Santiago
- Fernando López

Preliminary round – Group A

Pos	Team	Pld	W	D	L	GF	GA	GD	Pts	Qualification
1	Argentina	3	3	0	0	35	2	+33	9	Semi-finals
2	Chile (H)	3	2	0	1	21	3	+18	6	Semi-finals
3	Mexico	3	1	0	2	7	16	−9	3	5th–8th classification
4	Peru	3	0	0	3	1	43	−42	0	5th–8th classification

Source: FIH
Rules for classification: 1) points; 2) matches won; 3) goal difference; 4) goals for; 5) head-to-head result; 6) field goals for.
(H) Hosts

25 October 2023
19:30

Chile	15–0	Peru
Hurtado 3'; Fel. Renz 5', 12'; Fer. Renz 10', 45'; Troncoso 16'; Richter 22'; Pizarro 35', 55'; Amoroso 44', 54'; Becerra 48'; Maldonado 48'; Valenzuela 50'; Wolansky 53'	Report

Umpires:
Ilanggo Kanabathu (MAS)
Benjamin Peters (USA)

27 October 2023
17:30

Mexico	6–1	Peru
Estrada 15'; Sosa 30'; Villegas 34'; Muñoz 35'; Leon 57', 59'	Report	Contreras 26'

Umpires:
Oliver Höck (BRA)
Federico Silva (ARG)

29 October 2023
11:30

Argentina	22–0	Peru
Domene 3', 7', 9', 24', 27', 32', 41', 48'; Keenan 8', 24', 34'; Casella 15', 21'; Mazzilli 18'; Martínez 18', 49'; Toscani 37', 42', 44', 58'; Monja 53', 55'	Report

Umpires:
Jonathan Altamirano (MEX)
Reinier Diaz (CUB)

Cross-overs

1 November 2023
15:45

Brazil	8–1	Peru
Patrocínio 5'; Paixão 16', 36'; Martins 25'; Vehrle-Smith 29'; Luduena 41'; Lopez 45'; Imer 51'	Report	Rehder 5'

Umpires:
Guillermo Poblete Luna (CHI)
Jonathan Altamirano (MEX)

Seventh place match

3 November 2023
09:30

Trinidad and Tobago	10–0	Peru
Daniel 6'; Te. Marcano 8', 11', 19', 43', 43', 56'; Ta. Marcano 13', 25'; Phillip 51'	Report

Umpires:
Oliver Höck (BRA)
Jonathan Altamirano (MEX)

== Golf ==
Peru qualified a team of four golfers (two men and two women).

Athlete	Event	Round 1	Round 2	Round 3	Round 4	Total		
Athlete	Event	Score	Score	Score	Score	Score	Par	Rank
Joaquín Lolas	Men's individual	70	73	72	69	284	–4	17
Luis Barco⁣	Men's individual	76	73	73	70	292	+4	24
Luisamariana Mesones	Women's individual	77	73	73	74	297	+9	15
Camila Zignaigo	Women's individual	86	84	76	75	321	+33	29

== Gymnastics ==
=== Artistic ===
Peru qualified three gymnasts in artistic (two men and one woman) at the 2023 Pan American Championships.

Men

Individual Qualification

Athlete	Event	Qualification						Total	Rank
Athlete	Event	F	PH	R	V	PB	HB	Total	Rank
Daniel Alarcón	All-around	13.000	13.233	12.266	13.800	13.300	12.533	78.132	13 Q
Edward González	All-around	—N/a	7.833 Q	—N/a					

Qualification Legend: Q = Qualified to apparatus final

Individual Finals

Athlete	Event	Apparatus						Total	
Athlete	Event	F	PH	R	PB	V	HB	Score	Rank
Daniel Alarcón	All-around	11.400	12.733	13.166	12.766	12.066	12.400	74.531	18
Edward González	Pommel horse	—N/a	12.900	—N/a					7

Women

Individual Qualification

Athlete	Event	Qualification				Total	Rank
Athlete	Event	V	UB	BB	F	Total	Rank
Ana Karina Reyes⁣	All-around	Did not start					

Qualification Legend: Q = Qualified to apparatus final

=== Rhythmic ===
Peru qualified one individual gymnast.

Individual

Athlete	Event	Apparatus				Final total	
Athlete	Event	Ball	Clubs	Hoop	Ribbon	Score	Rank
Sofía Lay⁣	All-around	24.550	23.150	23.700	20.050	91.450	17
Sofía Lay⁣	Ball	24.550	—N/a			Did not advance	
Sofía Lay⁣	Clubs	—N/a	23.150	—N/a		Did not advance	
Sofía Lay⁣	Hoop	—N/a		23.700	—N/a	Did not advance	
Sofía Lay⁣	Ribbon	—N/a			20.050	Did not advance	

== Judo ==
Peru has qualified 7 judokas (three men and four women).

Men

Athlete	Event	Round of 16	Quarterfinals	Semifinals	Repechage	Final / BM	
Athlete	Event	Opposition Result	Opposition Result	Opposition Result	Opposition Result	Opposition Result	Rank
Juan Postigos	−66 kg	Bye	Ramírez (DOM); W 01–00	Frascadore (CAN); L 00–10	Bye	Bronze medal final Lima (BRA); L 00–10	=5
Daryl Yamamoto	−100 kg	Cardona (CUB); L 00–11	Did not advance				
Valentino Valdivia	+100 kg	Del Sol (MEX); L 00–10	Did not advance				

Women

Athlete	Event	Round of 16	Quarterfinals	Semifinals	Repechage	Final / BM	
Athlete	Event	Opposition Result	Opposition Result	Opposition Result	Opposition Result	Opposition Result	Rank
Brillith Gamarra	−52 kg	Cordones (PAN); L 00–01	Did not advance				
Marian Flores	−57 kg	Gavidia (ECU); L 00–10	Did not advance				
Camila Figueroa	−78 kg	Bye	Colón (PUR); L 00–11	Did not advance	Godbout (CAN); W 10–00	Bronze medal final Chalá (ECU); W 01–00	3rd place, bronze medalist(s)
Yuliana Bolívar	+78 kg	Bye	Morillo (DOM); L 00–10	Did not advance	Souza (BRA); L 00–10	Did not advance	

== Karate ==
Peru qualified a team of 5 karatekas (one man and two women) at the 2022 South American Games. Besides, Peru qualified 1 extra karateka after winning one category during the 2021 Junior Pan American Games.

Kumite

Athlete	Event	Elimination pool					Semifinal	Final	
Athlete	Event	Opposition Result	Opposition Result	Opposition Result	Opposition Result	Rank	Opposition Result	Opposition Result	Rank
Claudia de la Cruz	Women's −50 kg	Izaguirre (ESA); W 2–1	Benítez (ARG); W 2–1	Delgado (USA); W 1–0	Morales (EAI); L 0–3	3	Did not advance		
Alexandra Grande	Women's −61 kg	Fonseca (PUR); L 5–6	Wainwright (USA); W 2–0	Huaiquimán (CHI); W 3–1	—N/a	2 Q	Wong (EAI); W 5–4	Fonseca (PUR); L 7–10	2nd place, silver medalist(s)
Sol Cabrera	Women's −68 kg	Velozo (CHI); L 0–9	Lingl (USA); L 1–1	Mosquera (COL); L 0–5	—N/a	4	Did not advance		
Gianella Fernández	Women's +68 kg	Padilha (BRA); L 0–2	Rodríguez (DOM); L 2–5	Torres (COL); L 0–1	González (CHI); L 3–7	5	Did not advance		

Kata

Athlete	Event	Elimination pool				Final / BM	
Athlete	Event	Opposition Result	Opposition Result	Opposition Result	Rank	Opposition Result	Rank
Mariano Wong	Men's individual	Luengo (CHI); W 40.20–37.70	Leocadio (VEN); L 40.50–39.00	Conde (BRA); W 39.70–38.30	2 FB	Bronze medal final Impagnatiello (ARG); L 39.30–40.20	4

== Modern pentathlon ==
Peru qualified three modern pentathletes (two men and one woman).

Athlete	Event	Fencing ranking round (Épée one touch)			Semifinal									Final												
Athlete	Event	Fencing ranking round (Épée one touch)			Fencing	Swimming (200 m freestyle)			Shooting / Running (10 m laser pistol / 3000 m cross-country)			Total		Fencing	Swimming			Riding (Show jumping)				Shooting / Running			Total	
Athlete	Event	V – D	Rank	MP points	BP	Time	Rank	MP points	Time	Rank	MP points	MP points	Rank	BP	Time	Rank	MP points	Time	Faults	Rank	MP points	Time	Rank	MP points	MP points	Rank
Santiago Bedia⁣	Men's individual	7–23	30	166	0	2:22.36	13	266	12:12.90	16	535	967	16	Did not advance												
Jair Samamé	Men's individual	15–15	17	214	0	2:24.88	15	261	12:19.70	15	561	1036	15	Did not advance												
Santiago Bedia⁣ Jair Samame⁣	Men's relay	12–24	11	190	—N/a									0	2:07.93	11	295	EL			0	13:20.60	10	500	985	11
Arantza Castañeda⁣	Women's individual	5–27	32	148	2	3:05.35	17	180	13:52.70	16	372	702	17	Did not advance												

== Roller sports ==
=== Skateboarding ===
Peru qualified a team of three athletes (two men and one woman) in skateboarding.

Athlete	Event	Final	
Athlete	Event	Score	Rank
Raphael Scheelje	Men's park	57.76	7
Ángelo Caro	Men's street	256.80	2nd place, silver medalist(s)
Brigitte Morales	Women's park	75.54	4

== Rowing ==
Peru qualified a team of 10 athletes (seven men and three women).

Key

FA=Final A (medal); FB=Final B (non-medal); SA/B=Semifinals A/B; R=Repechage

Men

Athlete	Event	Heat		Repechage		Semifinal		Final A/B	
Athlete	Event	Time	Rank	Time	Rank	Time	Rank	Time	Rank
Álvaro Torres	Single sculls (M1X)	7:26.30	2 SA/B	Bye		7:07.51	4 FB	7:14.87	7
Víctor Aspillaga; Vincenzo Giurfa	Double sculls (M2X)	7:10.89	2 SA/B	Bye		7:00.83	5 FB	DNS	
Andrés Sandoval; César Cipriani	Lightweight double sculls (LM2X)	6:52.98	4 R	6:48.29	3 FB	—N/a		6:52.50	7
Alberto Limonta; Gianfranco Coletti	Pair (M2-)	7:43.68	6 R	7:24.87	4 FB	—N/a		7:19.53	9

Women

Athlete	Event	Heat		Repechage		Semifinal		Final A/B	
Athlete	Event	Time	Rank	Time	Rank	Time	Rank	Time	Rank
Adriana Sanguineti	Single sculls (W1X)	8:36.38	2 SA/B	Bye		8:04.20	2 FA	8:11.32	6
Alessia Palacios; Valeria Palacios	Lightweight double sculls (LW2X)	7:29.70	4 R	7:22.13	2 FA	—N/a		7:21.38	5

== Sailing ==
Peru qualified 8 boats for a total of 12 sailors.

Men

Athlete	Event	Race											Total	
Athlete	Event	1	2	3	4	5	6	7	8	9	10	M	Points	Rank
Stefano Peschiera	Laser	2	~~8~~	1	2	2	4	1	7	2	1	4	26	1st place, gold medalist(s)
Jean Paul de Trazegnies	Sunfish	3	2	2	3	1	3	2	~~5~~	2	4	6	28	2nd place, silver medalist(s)

Women

Athlete	Event	Race																			Total	
Athlete	Event	1	2	3	4	5	6	7	8	9	10	11	12	13	14	15	16	QF	SF	M	Points	Rank
María Belén Bazo	iQFoil	2	2	2	1	1	2	1	1	1	2	~~3~~	~~3~~	1	~~3~~	2	2	Bye	4	EL	20	5
Florencia Chiarella	Laser radial	5	5	6	3	~~18~~ (OCS)	3	2	8	5	7	—N/a								8	52	5
Caterina Romero	Sunfish	1	1	1	1	1	1	1	~~2~~	1	1	—N/a								2	11	1st place, gold medalist(s)
Diana Tudela; Adriana Barrón	49erFX	5	5	~~6~~ (OCS)	3	4	5	5	5	5	5	5	5	—N/a						10	62	5

Mixed

Athlete	Event	Race											Total	
Athlete	Event	1	2	3	4	5	6	7	8	9	10	M	Points	Rank
Ismael Muelle⁣ Alessia Zavala	Snipe	3	6	5	~~8~~	5	6	7	6	6	7	EL	51	7
Juan Daniel Mendoza; Claudia Gaviño; María Gracia Vegas⁣	Lightning	5	5	4	~~7~~	5	7	5	7	7	2	10	56	5

== Shooting ==
Peru qualified a total of 16 shooters in the 2022 Americas Shooting Championships. Peru also qualified four shooters during the 2022 South American Games.

Men

Athlete	Event	Qualification		Final	
Athlete	Event	Points	Rank	Points	Rank
Kevin Altamirano	10 m air pistol	562	18	Did not advance	
Marko Carrillo	10 m air pistol	566	10	Did not advance	
Kevin Altamirano	25 m rapid fire pistol	573	5 Q	12	5
Marko Carrillo	25 m rapid fire pistol	573	3 Q	16	4
Cristian Morales	10 m air rifle	618.5	7 Q	225.1	3rd place, bronze medalist(s)
Diego Morín	10 m air rifle	616.1	12	Did not advance	
Cristian Morales	50 m rifle three positions	575	8 Q	392.0	8
Daniel Vizcarra	50 m rifle three positions	573	11	Did not advance	
Nicolás Giha	Skeet	109	21	Did not advance	
Nicolás Pacheco	Skeet	123	2 Q	44	3rd place, bronze medalist(s)
Asier Cilloniz	Trap	109	15	Did not advance	
Alessandro de Souza	Trap	116+1	4 Q	28	4

Women

Athlete	Event	Qualification		Final	
Athlete	Event	Points	Rank	Points	Rank
Annia Becerra	10 m air pistol	570	6 Q	112.4	8
Brianda Rivera	10 m air pistol	539	24	Did not advance	
Miriam Quintanilla	25 m pistol	560	12	Did not advance	
Brianda Rivera	25 m pistol	564	9	Did not advance	
Alexia Arenas	10 m air rifle	622.0	8 Q	141.9	7
Sara Vizcarra	10 m air rifle	619.0	12	Did not advance	
Alexia Arenas	50 m rifle three positions	568	14	Did not advance	
Sara Vizcarra	50 m rifle three positions	586	3 Q	389.7	8
Daniella Borda	Skeet	114+2	6 Q	40	3rd place, bronze medalist(s)
Valentina Porcella	Trap	104	10	Did not advance	

Mixed

Athlete	Event	Qualification		Final / BM	
Athlete	Event	Points	Rank	Opposition Result	Rank
Annia Becerra; Marko Carrillo	10 m air pistol team	559	13	Did not advance	
Sara Vizcarra; Cristian Morales	10 m air rifle team	616.8	10	Did not advance	
Alexia Arenas; Diego Morín	10 m air rifle team	618.1	8	Did not advance	
Nicolás Pacheco; Daniella Borda	Skeet team	132	8	Did not advance	

== Softball ==
Summary

Team	Event	Preliminary round				Semifinal	Final / BM / Pl.	
Team	Event	Opposition Result	Opposition Result	Opposition Result	Rank	Opposition Result	Opposition Result	Rank
Peru women	Women's tournament	Puerto Rico; L 0–3	Canada; L 0–10	Cuba; L 0–4	4	—N/a	Seventh place match Chile; W 10–0	7

Peru qualified a women's team (of 16 athletes) by virtue of its campaign in the 2022 Pan American Championships.

Roster

- Brunella Vílchez⁣
- Mariafé Maldonado⁣l
- Paola Cabrera⁣
- María Mora⁣
- Suemi Kobashigawa⁣
- Kiana Matsuda⁣
- Jimena Nakahara⁣
- Alessandra Ykehara⁣
- Allison Mandujano⁣
- María Hilario⁣
- Itati Berru⁣
- Frances Koizumi⁣
- Alessandra Muguruza⁣
- Aimi Iliana Yshiki⁣
- Thais Kanashiro⁣
- Adriana Oka⁣

Group B

Pos	Team	Pld	W	L	RF	RA	PCT	GB	Qualification
1	Puerto Rico	3	3	0	8	3	1.000	—	Super Round
2	Canada	3	2	1	16	3	.667	1	Super Round
3	Cuba	3	1	2	5	6	.333	2	Fifth place game
4	Peru	3	0	3	0	17	.000	3	Seventh place game

Source: Santiago 2023 and WBSC Americas

October 30; 10:00	Peru	0–3	Puerto Rico	Baseball and Softball Center, Santiago
October 30; 10:00		Boxscore		Baseball and Softball Center, Santiago

October 31; 10:00	Canada	10–0 (F/5)	Peru	Baseball and Softball Center, Santiago
October 31; 10:00		Boxscore		Baseball and Softball Center, Santiago

November 1; 10:00	Peru	0–4	Cuba	Baseball and Softball Center, Santiago
November 1; 10:00		Boxscore		Baseball and Softball Center, Santiago

Seventh place game

November 2; 10:00	Chile	0–10 (F/4)	Peru	Baseball and Softball Center, Santiago
November 2; 10:00		Boxscore		Baseball and Softball Center, Santiago

== Sport climbing ==
Peru qualified two climbers (one per gender) by virtue of their IFSC world rankings.

Boulder & lead

Athlete	Event	Qualification						Final					
Athlete	Event	Bouldering		Lead		Total		Bouldering		Lead		Total	
Athlete	Event	Points	Rank	Points	Rank	Points	Rank	Points	Rank	Points	Rank	Points	Rank
Diego Lequerica	Men's	64.7	9	36	14	100.7	13	Did not advance					
Sofía Herrera	Women's	13.9	20	9.1	20	23	20	Did not advance					

== Squash ==
Peru qualified a team of three male athletes through the 2023 Pan American Squash Championships.

Men

Athlete	Event	Round of 16	Quarterfinal	Semifinal / CS	Final / BM / Pl.	
Athlete	Event	Opposition Result	Opposition Result	Opposition Result	Opposition Result	Rank
Diego Elías	Singles	Lacroix (CHI); W 3–0	Baillargeon (CAN); W 3–1	Cárdenas (MEX); W 3–0	Rodríguez (COL); W 3–1	1st place, gold medalist(s)
Alonso Escudero	Singles	Romiglio (ARG); L 0–3	Did not advance			
Diego Elías; Alonso Escudero	Doubles	—N/a	Pezzota / Romiglio (ARG); W 2–1	Cárdenas / Salazar (MEX); L 1–2	Did not advance	3rd place, bronze medalist(s)
Diego Elías; Alonso Escudero; Rafael Gálvez	Team	—N/a	Independent Athletes Team; W 2–0	Argentina; L 1–2	Did not advance	3rd place, bronze medalist(s)

== Surfing ==
Peru qualified ten surfers (five men and five women).

- Note – In shortboard, longboard and SUP surf events, the loser of the bronze medal heat won the bronze medal while the winner advanced to the final for the gold medal.

Shortboard

Athlete	Event	Round 1	Round 2	Round 3	Round 4	Repechage 1	Repechage 2	Repechage 3	Repechage 4	Repechage 5	Repechage 6	Final	
Athlete	Event	Opposition Result	Opposition Result	Opposition Result	Opposition Result	Opposition Result	Opposition Result	Opposition Result	Opposition Result	Opposition Result	Opposition Result	Opposition Result	Rank
Lucca Mesinas	Men's shortboard	Satt (CHI); W 17.67–8.67	Usuna (ARG); W 10.66–5.60	Tudela (PER); L 11.83–13.96	Did not advance	Bye			Kymerson (BRA); W 10.80–10.43	Young (CAN); W 14.67–13.83	Tudela (PER); W 15.50–8.57	Bellorin (VEN); W 13.16–9.10	1st place, gold medalist(s)
Miguel Tudela	Men's shortboard	López (VEN); W 14.27–11.60	Kymerson (BRA); W 12.33–11.53	Mesinas (PER); W 13.96–11.83	Bellorin (VEN); L 8.66–12.33	Bye					Mesinas (PER); L 8.57–15.50	Did not advance	3rd place, bronze medalist(s)
Sol Aguirre	Women's shortboard	López (CHI); L 0.67–10.27	Did not advance			Gómez (COL); W 6.66–5.50	Tuach (BAR); W 12.57–9.50	Lima (BRA); W 14.67–4.50	López (CHI); L 0.00–8.57	Did not advance			
Daniella Rosas	Women's shortboard	Barona (ECU); W 11.33–6.96	Resano (NCA); W 11.40–8.14	Weston-Webb (BRA); L 10.50–12.04	Did not advance	Bye			Dempfle-Olin (CAN); L 8.44–11.84	Did not advance			

Longboard and Stand up paddleboard

Athlete	Event	Round 1		Round 2		Round 3	Round 4	Repechage 1	Repechage 2	Repechage 3	Repechage 4	Repechage 5	Final	
Athlete	Event	Points	Rank	Points	Rank	Opposition Result	Opposition Result	Opposition Result	Opposition Result	Opposition Result	Opposition Result	Opposition Result	Opposition Result	Rank
Benoit Clemente	Men's longboard	12.16	1 Q	14.07	1 Q	Cortéz (CHI); W 14.17–8.60	Bahia (BRA); W 14.50–11.40	Bye					Cortéz (CHI); W 12.16–10.37	1st place, gold medalist(s)
María Fernanda Reyes	Women's longboard	15.00	1 Q	12.17	1 Q	Pellizzari (ARG); W 8.90–1.10	Calmon (BRA); W 14.33–13.37	Bye					Calmon (BRA); W 7.50–6.64	1st place, gold medalist(s)
Tamil Martino	Men's stand up paddleboard	8.24	2 Q	6.57	3 RR2	Did not advance		Bye	Salazar (CHI); L 14.60–16.60	Did not advance				
Vania Torres	Women's stand up paddleboard	7.63	1 Q	10.07	1 Q	Gómez (COL); L 3.47–7.43	Did not advance	Bye		Bruhwiler (CAN); W 16.16–4.17	Cosoleto (ARG); W 8.77–5.33	Gómez (COL); L 3.67–6.33	Did not advance	3rd place, bronze medalist(s)

=== SUP race ===
Athlete	Event	Time	Rank
Itzel Delgado	Men's stand up paddleboard	13:25.2	2nd place, silver medalist(s)
Giannisa Vecco	Women's stand up paddleboard	19:00.9	7

== Swimming ==
Peru qualified a team of 12 swimmers (four men and eight women).

Key

- Note – Ranks given are for the entire round
- NR – National record
- Q – Qualify to the medal final (Final A)
- q – Qualify to the non-medal final (Final B)
- * – Indicates that the athlete swam in the heat but not the final

Men

Athlete	Event	Heat		Final	
Athlete	Event	Time	Rank	Time	Rank
Joaquín Vargas	100 m freestyle	51.72	19	Did not advance	
Joaquín Vargas	200 m freestyle	1:51.18	12 q	1:50.75	9
Joaquín Vargas	400 m freestyle	3:57.78	11 q	3:58.06	10
Rafael Ponce	800 m freestyle	—N/a		8:24:08	18
Rafael Ponce	1500 m freestyle	—N/a		16:15:75	16
Ricardo Espinosa; Rafael Ponce; Carlos Cobos; Joaquín Vargas	4 × 100 m freestyle relay	3:33.90	8 Q	3:30.34	8
Carlos Cobos; Joaquín Vargas; Ricardo Espinosa; Rafael Ponce	4 × 100 m medley relay	4:05.23	11	Did not advance	

Women

Athlete	Event	Heat		Final	
Athlete	Event	Time	Rank	Time	Rank
Rafaela Fernandini	50 m freestyle	26.25	16 q	26.12	14
Rafaela Fernandini	100 m freestyle	57.61	17 q	57.34	13
María Bramont-Arias	800 m freestyle	—N/a		9:12:96	10
María Bramont-Arias	1500 m freestyle	—N/a		17:47:89	11
McKenna DeBever	100 m backstroke	1:03.23	12 q	1:03.54	15
Alexia Sotomayor	100 m backstroke	1:04.08	17	Did not advance	
McKenna DeBever	200 m backstroke	2:16.68	6 Q	2:17.43	7
Alexia Sotomayor	200 m backstroke	2:18.32	11 q	2:16.62	10
María Fe Muñoz	100 m butterfly	1:03.35	20	Did not advance	
Yasmín Silva	200 m butterfly	2:15.51	8 Q	2:15.90	7
McKenna DeBever	200 m individual medley	2:17.58	7 Q	2:18.28	8
María Fe Muñoz	400 m individual medley	5:09.37	14 q	DNS	
McKenna DeBever; Rafaela Fernandini; Sophía Ribeiro; Alexia Sotomayor	4 × 100 m freestyle relay	3:52.77	9	Did not advance	
Sophía Ribeiro; María Bramont-Arias; McKenna DeBever*; María Fe Muñoz; Yasmín Silva	4 × 200 m freestyle relay	8:43.63	10 Q	8:58.38	8
McKenna DeBever; Rafaela Fernandini; María Fe Muñoz; Yasmín Silva	4 × 100 m medley relay	DNS		—N/a	
María Bramont-Arias	10 km open water	—N/a		2:02:47.4	8
Fanny Ccollcca	10 km open water	—N/a		2:04:48.1	13

1. ^{a} Rafaela Fernandini advanced to the Final B replacing Venezuelan María Yegres (ranked 16th in heats) who withdrew from the final.
2. ^{b} Peru advanced to the Final replacing the Argentine team (ranked 7th in heats) who withdrew from the final.

Mixed

Athlete	Event	Heat		Final	
Athlete	Event	Time	Rank	Time	Rank
Rafael Ponce; Ricardo Espinosa; Rafaela Fernandini; Sophía Ribeiro	4 × 100 m freestyle relay	3:41.90	9	Did not advance	
Carlos Cobos; McKenna DeBever; Alexia Sotomayor; Ricardo Espinosa	4 × 100 m medley relay	4:10.32	10	Did not advance	

== Table tennis ==
Peru qualified a team of four athletes (three men and one woman) through the 2023 Special Qualification Event.

Men and women

Athlete	Event	Group stage			Round of 32	Round of 16	Quarterfinal	Semifinal	Final / BM	
Athlete	Event	Opposition Result	Opposition Result	Rank	Opposition Result	Opposition Result	Opposition Result	Opposition Result	Opposition Result	Rank
Felipe Duffoó	Men's singles	—N/a			Ishiy (BRA); L 2–4	Did not advance				
Carlos Fernández	Men's singles	—N/a			Calderano (BRA); L 0–4	Did not advance				
Rodrigo Hidalgo; Carlos Fernández	Men's doubles	—N/a				Montes / Ramos (COL); W 4–0	Gómez / Burgos (CHI); L 0–4	Did not advance		
Felipe Duffoó; Rodrigo Hidalgo; Carlos Fernández	Men's team	Argentina; L 1–3	Chile; W 3–2	2 Q	—N/a		United States; L 1–3	Did not advance		
Isabel Duffoó	Women's singles	—N/a			Takahashi (BRA); L 0–4	Did not advance				

Mixed

Athlete	Event	Round of 32	Round of 16	Quarterfinal	Semifinal	Final / BM	
Athlete	Event	Opposition Result	Opposition Result	Opposition Result	Opposition Result	Opposition Result	Rank
Felipe Duffoó; Isabel Duffoó	Doubles	—N/a	Afanador / Díaz (PUR); L 0–4	Did not advance			

== Taekwondo ==
Peru qualified six athletes (two men and four women) during the Pan American Games Qualification Tournament.

Kyorugi

Athlete	Event	Round of 16	Quarterfinals	Semifinals	Repechage	Final/ BM	
Athlete	Event	Opposition Result	Opposition Result	Opposition Result	Opposition Result	Opposition Result	Rank
Raymiguel Barreto	Men's +58 kg	Guzmán (ARG); L 0–2	Did not advance		Garrido (COL); L 0–2	Did not advance	
Alessandra Suárez	Women's –49 kg	Daniel (USA); L 0–2	Did not advance				
Camila Cáceres	Women's –57 kg	Montano (ESA); L 0–2	Did not advance				
Eliana Vásquez	Women's –67 kg	Gallardo (CHI); L 0–2	Did not advance				
Eliana Vásquez; Camila Cáceres; Alessandra Suárez	Women's team	Canada; W 1–0	Cuba; L 30–72	Did not advance			

Poomsae (forms)

Athlete	Event	Round of 16	Quarterfinal	Semifinal	Final	
Athlete	Event	Opposition Result	Opposition Result	Opposition Result	Opposition Result	Rank
Hugo del Castillo	Men's individual	Bye	Troya (ECU); W 7.630–7.150	Arroyo (MEX); L 7.770–7.850	Did not advance	3rd place, bronze medalist(s)
Gabriela Castillo	Women's individual	Bye	Medina (PUR); L 7.230–7.490	Did not advance		
Gabriela Castillo; Hugo del Castillo	Mixed pair	—N/a			7.240	8

== Tennis ==
Peru qualified a total of six tennis players (three men and three women). Jorge Panta was part of the list presented by the Peruvian Olympic Committee for Pan American Games, however, he was eventually not included in the final entry list for tennis.

Men

Athlete	Event	Round of 64	Round of 32	Round of 16	Quarterfinal	Semifinal	Final / BM	
Athlete	Event	Opposition Result	Opposition Result	Opposition Result	Opposition Result	Opposition Result	Opposition Result	Rank
Gonzalo Bueno	Singles	Bye	Soriano (COL); L 3–6, 4–6	Did not advance				
Conner Huertas del Pino	Singles	Crespo (CRC); W 7–6^{(7–5)}, 6–3	Monteiro (BRA); L 0–6, 4–6	Did not advance				
Conner Huertas del Pino; Gonzalo Bueno	Doubles	—N/a		Bye	Crespo / Flores (CRC); L 6–7^{(13–15)}, 2–6	Did not advance		

Women

Athlete	Event	Round of 64	Round of 32	Round of 16	Quarterfinal	Semifinal	Final / BM	
Athlete	Event	Opposition Result	Opposition Result	Opposition Result	Opposition Result	Opposition Result	Opposition Result	Rank
Romina Ccuno	Singles	Bye	Rodríguez (URU); W 6–2, 6–0	Suárez (VEN); L 1–6, 3–6	Did not advance			
Anastasia Iamachkine	Singles	Bye	Leacock (TTO); W 6–0, 6–0	Marino (CAN); L 4–6, 3–6	Did not advance			
Lucciana Pérez Alarcón	Singles	Valitova (SKN); W 6–0, 6–2	Romero (ECU); W 6–0, 6–2	Pigossi (BRA); L 6–2, 5–7, 4–6	Did not advance			
Anastasia Iamachkine; Lucciana Pérez Alarcón	Doubles	—N/a		Williford / Zamburek (DOM); W 6–3, 6–4	Herazo / Pérez (COL); L 5–7, 4–6	Did not advance		

Mixed

Athlete	Event	Round of 16	Quarterfinal	Semifinal	Final / BM	
Athlete	Event	Opposition Result	Opposition Result	Opposition Result	Opposition Result	Rank
Conner Huertas del Pino; Romina Ccuno	Doubles	Bertran / Williford (DOM); W 6–0, 6–2	Boyer / Loeb (USA); W 6–4, 3–6, [10–6]	Barrientos / Lizarazo (COL); L 3–6, 6–7^{(4–7)}	Bronze medal final Acosta / Capurro (ARG); L 1–6, 4–6	4

== Volleyball ==
=== Beach ===
Peru qualified a women's pair for a total of two athletes.

Athlete	Event	Group stage				Round of 16	Quarterfinal	Semifinal	Final / BM / Pl.	
Athlete	Event	Opposition Result	Opposition Result	Opposition Result	Rank	Opposition Result	Opposition Result	Opposition Result	Opposition Result	Rank
Claudia Gaona; Lisbeth Allca	Women's tournament	Quiggle / Murphy (USA); L (13–21, 18–21)	Gallay / Pereyra (ARG); L (16–21, 15–21)	Alvarado / Girón (EAI); W (22–20, 21–10)	3 q	Mongelos / Valiente (PAR); W (21–19, 21–19)	Ramos / Lisboa (BRA); L (12–21, 9–21)	5th–8th semifinals Vorpahl / Rivas (CHI); W (21–18, 22–20)	Seventh place match Gutiérrez / Flores (MEX); L (9–21, 18–21)	6

== Water skiing ==
Peru qualified two water skiers after the 2022 Pan American Water skiing Championship.

Women

Athlete	Event	Preliminary					Final				
Athlete	Event	Slalom	Jump	Tricks	Total	Rank	Slalom	Jump	Tricks	Total	Rank
Delfina Cuglievan	Slalom	3.00/55/11.25	—N/a			4 Q	3.50/55/11.25	—N/a			4
Delfina Cuglievan	Jump	—N/a	1.0	—N/a		=8	Did not advance				
Delfina Cuglievan	Overall	818.18	0.00	0.00	818.18	10	Did not advance				
Natalia Cuglievan	Tricks	—N/a		9900	—N/a	4 Q	—N/a		10060	—N/a	4

== Weightlifting ==
Peru qualified six weightlifters (three men and three women).

Men

Athlete	Event	Snatch		Clean & Jerk		Total	Rank
Athlete	Event	Result	Rank	Result	Rank	Total	Rank
Luis Bardalez	–61 kg	124	4	151	3	275	3rd place, bronze medalist(s)
Amel Atencia	–102 kg	155	9	196	6	351	8
Hernán Viera	+102 kg	152	8	205	3	357	8

Women

Athlete	Event	Snatch		Clean & Jerk		Total	Rank
Athlete	Event	Result	Rank	Result	Rank	Total	Rank
Shoely Mego	–49 kg	78	4	~~100~~	DNF	78	DNF
Analí Saldarriaga	–59 kg	68	14	87	12	155	13
Eldi Paredes⁣	–71 kg	87	10	111	9	198	10

== Wrestling ==
Peru qualified 4 wrestlers (two men and two women) through the 2022 Pan American Wrestling Championships and the 2023 Pan American Wrestling Championships.

Key:

- VT – Victory by fall.
- PP – Decision by points – the loser with technical points.
- PO – Decision by points – the loser without technical points.
- SP – Technical superiority – the loser with technical points and a margin of victory of at least 9 (Greco-Roman) or 10 (freestyle) points.
- ST – Great superiority – the loser without technical points and a margin of victory of at least 8 (Greco-Roman) or 10 (freestyle) points.
- VA – Decision by withdrawal

Men

Athlete	Event	Round of 16	Quarterfinal	Semifinal	Repechage	Final / BM	
Athlete	Event	Opposition Result	Opposition Result	Opposition Result	Opposition Result	Opposition Result	Rank
Sixto Auccapiña	Freestyle 65 kg	Garrett (USA); L 1–3^{PP}	Did not advance		Quispe (CHI); W 4–0^{SP}	Bronze medal final Destribats (ARG); L 1–3^{PP}	=5
Nilton Soto	Greco-Roman 67 kg	Olmos (MEX); W 0–0^{VA}	Laguerre (DOM); W 6–5^{PP}	Horta (COL); L 0–8ST	Bye	Bronze medal final Lovera (ARG); W 9–0ST	3rd place, bronze medalist(s)

Women

Athlete	Event	Round of 16	Quarterfinal	Semifinal	Repechage	Final / BM	
Athlete	Event	Opposition Result	Opposition Result	Opposition Result	Opposition Result	Opposition Result	Rank
Thalía Mallqui	Freestyle 53 kg	Bye	Yépez (ECU); L 0–10^{SP}	Did not advance	Bye	Bronze medal final Valdés (CHI); L 2–4^{SP}	=5
Yanet Sovero	Freestyle 68 kg	Bye	Garnica (MEX); L 0–4^{SP}	Did not advance			8

== See also ==
- Peru at the 2024 Summer Olympics
