= Surfing at the 2023 Pan American Games – Women's shortboard =

Women's shortboard at the 2023 Pan American Games
- Venue: Punta de Lobos beach
- Dates: October 24 - October 27; October 30
- Competitors: 16 from 12 nations

Medalists
Gold medal	Tatiana Weston-Webb	Brazil
Silver medal	Sanoa Dempfle-Olin	Canada
Bronze medal	Leilani McGonagle	Costa Rica

The women's shortboard competition of the surfing events at the 2023 Pan American Games was held from October 24 to 30 at Punta de Lobos beach in Pichilemu, Chile.

== Schedule ==
Date	Time	Round
October 24, 2023	10:18	Main Round 1
October 25, 2023	09:32	Repechage Round 1
October 26, 2023	11:04	Main Round 2
October 26, 2023	14:08	Repechage Round 2
October 26, 2023	17:58	Repechage Round 3
October 27, 2023	08:46	Main Round 3
October 27, 2023	11:50	Repechage Round 4
October 27, 2023	16:03	Repechage Round 5
October 27, 2023	10:20	Main Round 4
October 30, 2023	13:33	Finals

== Results ==
=== Finals ===
The winner of the bronze medal match advances to the gold metal match while the loser receives the bronze medal.

Gold medal match
Tatiana Weston-Webb (BRA)	12.33
Sanoa Dempfle-Olin (CAN)	10.13
Bronze medal match
Sanoa Dempfle-Olin (CAN)	10.00
Leilani McGonagle (CRC)	4.20

=== Elimination rounds ===
The winners of each match advance to the next round while the losers advance to their respective round in the repechage. The results during the elimination rounds were as follows:

Round 1
Leilani McGonagle (CRC)	15.33
Samantha Alonso (PAN)	5.00
Silvana Lima (BRA)	9.23
Regina Pioli (MEX)	3.00
Chelsea Tuach (BAR)	8.67
Izzi Gómez (COL)	8.23
Sol Aguirre (PER)	0.67
Estela López (CHI)	10.27
Tatiana Weston-Webb (BRA)	12.50
Jessica Anderson (CHI)	9.20
Lucía Indurain (ARG)	7.03
Sanoa Dempfle-Olin (CAN)	9.26
Candelaria Resano (NCA)	11.50
Orlena Pellizzari (ARG)	6.77
Daniella Rosas (PER)	11.3
Dominic Barona (ECU)	6.96

Round 2
Leilani McGonagle (CRC)	10.03
Silvana Lima (BRA)	7.07
Chelsea Tuach (BAR)	10.50
Estela López (CHI)	10.90
Tatiana Weston-Webb (BRA)	15.43
Sanoa Dempfle-Olin (CAN)	5.17
Candelaria Resano (NCA)	8.14
Daniella Rosas (PER)	11.40

Round 3
Leilani McGonagle (CRC)	8.16
Estela López (CHI)	5.33
Tatiana Weston-Webb (BRA)	12.04
Daniella Rosas (PER)	10.50

Round 4
Leilani McGonagle (CRC)	8.33
Tatiana Weston-Webb (BRA)	14.10

=== Repechage ===
The winners of each match advances to the next round. The winner of the fifth round advance to the bronze medal match. The results during the repechage rounds were as follows:

Round 1
Samanta Alonso (PAN)	3.67
Regina Pioli (MEX)	4.00
Izzi Gómez (COL)	5.50
Sol Aguirre (PER)	6.66
Jessica Anderson (CHI)	9.43
Lucía Indurain (ARG)	12.60
Ornela Pellizzari (ARG)	6.80
Dominic Barona (ECU)	1.80

Round 2
Regina Pioli (MEX)	3.30
Silvana Lima (BRA)	10.30
Sol Aguirre (PER)	12.57
Chelsea Tuach (BAR)	9.50
Lucía Indurain (ARG)	9.00
Sanoa Dempfle-Olin (CAN)	15.96
Ornela Pellizzari (ARG)	4.77
Candelaria Resano (NCA)	8.00

Round 3
Silvana Lima (BRA)	4.50
Sol Aguirre (PER)	14.67
Sanoa Dempfle-Olin (CAN)	14.90
Candelaria Resano (NCA)	11.94

Round 4
Sol Aguirre (PER)	0.00
Estela López (CHI)	8.50
Sanoa Dempfle-Olin (CAN)	11.84
Daniella Rosas (PER)	8.44

Round 5
Estela López (CHI)	4.23
Sanoa Dempfle-Olin (CAN)	11.33
