= Surfing at the 2023 Pan American Games – Women's SUP surf =

Women's SUP surf at the 2023 Pan American Games
- Venue: Punta de Lobos beach
- Dates: October 24 - October 27; October 30
- Competitors: 9 from 9 nations

Medalists
Gold medal	Izzi Gómez	Colombia
Silver medal	Aline Adisaka	Brazil
Bronze medal	Vania Torres	Peru

The women's SUP surf competition of the surfing events at the 2023 Pan American Games was held from October 24 to 30 at Punta de Lobos beach in Pichilemu, Chile.

== Schedule ==
Date	Time	Round
October 24, 2023	17:35	Main Round 1
October 25, 2023	13:22	Repechage Round 1
October 25, 2023	14:08	Main Round 2
October 26, 2023	15:40	Repechage Round 2
October 27, 2023	10:18	Main Round 3
October 27, 2023	12:36	Repechage Round 3
October 27, 2023	17:12	Repechage Round 4
October 27, 2023	18:21	Main Round 4
October 30, 2023	08:28	Finals

== Results ==
=== Finals ===
The winner of the bronze medal match advances to the gold metal match while the loser receives the bronze medal.

Gold medal match
Aline Adisaka (BRA)	7.04
Izzi Gómez (COL)	7.93
Bronze medal match
Izzi Gómez (COL)	6.33
Vania Torres (PER)	3.67

=== Elimination rounds ===
The winners of each match advance to the next round while the losers advance to their respective round in the repechage. The results during the elimination rounds were as follows:

Round 1
Lucía Cosoleto (ARG)	13.33
Catherine Bruhwiler (CAN)	4.84
María Lagos (CHI)	5.37
Aline Adisaka (BRA)	10.13
Xiomara Bowen (ECU)	7.77
Josselyn Alabi (ESA)	5.56
Izzi Gómez (COL)	5.10
Vania Torres (PER)	7.53
Sofía Finer (MEX)	4.20

Round 2
Lucía Cosoleto (ARG)	11.50
Xiomara Bowen (ECU)	5.07
Izzi Gómez (COL)	8.17
Aline Adisaka (BRA)	8.16
María Lagos (CHI)	3.17
Vania Torres (PER)	10.07

Round 3
Lucía Cosoleto (ARG)	8.17
Aline Adisaka (BRA)	8.43
Vania Torres (PER)	3.47
Izzi Gómez (COL)	7.43

Round 4
Aline Adisaka (BRA)	6.30
Izzi Gómez (COL)	2.73

=== Repechage ===
The winners of each match advances to the next round. The winner of the fourth round advance to the bronze medal match. The results during the repechage rounds were as follows:

Round 1
Catherine Bruhwiler (CAN)	6.17
Josselyn Alabi (ESA)	2.44
Sofía Finer (MEX)	6.67

Round 2
Sofía Finer (MEX)	4.34
Xiomara Bowen (ECU)	5.84
Catherine Bruhwiler (CAN)	9.00
María Lagos (CHI)	7.44

Round 3
Xiomara Bowen (ECU)	6.87
Lucía Cosoleto (ARG)	7.73
Catherine Bruhwiler (CAN)	4.17
Vania Torres (PER)	16.16

Round 4
Lucía Cosoleto (ARG)	5.33
Vania Torres (PER)	8.77
