= Surfing at the 2023 Pan American Games – Women's longboard =

Women's longboard at the 2023 Pan American Games
- Venue: Punta de Lobos beach
- Dates: October 24 - October 27; October 30
- Competitors: 9 from 9 nations

Medalists
Gold medal	María Fernanda Reyes	Peru
Silver medal	Chloé Calmon	Brazil
Bronze medal	Lia Reyes Días	Costa Rica

The women's longboard competition of the surfing events at the 2023 Pan American Games was held from October 24 to 30 at Punta de Lobos beach in Pichilemu, Chile.

== Schedule ==
Date	Time	Round
October 24, 2023	09:09	Main Round 1
October 25, 2023	08:46	Main Round 2
October 25, 2023	12:59	Repechage Round 1
October 25, 2023	16:26	Main Round 3
October 25, 2023	17:58	Repechage Round 2
October 26, 2023	08:46	Repechage Round 3
October 27, 2023	14:31	Repechage Round 4
October 27, 2023	15:17	Main Round 4
October 30, 2023	09:24	Finals

== Results ==
=== Finals ===
The winner of the bronze medal match advances to the gold metal match while the loser receives the bronze medal.

Gold medal match
María Fernanda Reyes (PER)	7.50
Chloé Calmon (BRA)	6.64
Bronze medal match
Chloé Calmon (BRA)	7.50
Lia Reyes Días (CRC)	1.17

=== Elimination rounds ===
The winners of each match advance to the next round while the losers advance to their respective round in the repechage. The results during the elimination rounds were as follows:

Round 1
2023

Round 2

Round 3

Round 4

=== Repechage ===
The winners of each match advances to the next round. The winner of the fourth round advance to the bronze medal match. The results during the repechage rounds were as follows:

Round 1
2023

Round 2

Round 3

Round 4
