= Surfing at the 2023 Pan American Games – Women's SUP race =

Women's SUP race at the 2023 Pan American Games
- Venue: Punta de Lobos beach
- Dates: October 30
- Competitors: 10 from 10 nations

Medalists
Gold medal	Candice Appleby	United States
Silver medal	Jennifer Kalmbach	Costa Rica
Bronze medal	Mariecarmen Rivera	Puerto Rico

The women's SUP race competition of the surfing events at the 2023 Pan American Games was held on October 30 at Punta de Lobos beach in Pichilemu, Chile.

== Schedule ==
Date	Time	Round
October 30, 2023	14:23	Final

== Results ==
The results during the elimination rounds were as follows:

Rank	Name	Nationality	Time	Notes
1st place, gold medalist(s)	Candice Appleby	United States	15:24.9	
2nd place, silver medalist(s)	Jennifer Kalmbach	Costa Rica	15:47.8	
3rd place, bronze medalist(s)	Mariecarmen Rivera	Puerto Rico	16:36.4	
4	Sofía Finer	Mexico	17:28.3	
5	Juliana González	Argentina	18:14.6	
6	Lena Ribeiro	Brazil	18:43.5	
7	Giannisa Vecco	Peru	19:00.9	
8	Stephanie Bodden	Panama	19.56.0	
9	Lina Augaitis	Canada	20.09.0	
10	Carla Pérez	Chile	20.50.1	
