= Hugo Catrileo =

Chilean long-distance runner

Personal information
- Born: 27 January 1997 (age 29)

Sport
- Country: Chile
- Sport: Athletics
- Event: Marathon
Medal record
Representing Chile
Men's athletics
Pan American Games
Silver medal – second place	2023 Santiago	Marathon

Hugo Catrileo (born 27 January 1997) is a Chilean long-distance runner. He was a silver medalist in the marathon at the 2023 Pan American Games.

== Career ==
He is from Saavedra in the Araucanía Region of Chile. He attended Luis González Vásquez High School in Nueva Imperial, later graduating from the Temuco Catholic University. He placed fourth overall at the 2022 Buenos Aires Marathon.

At the 2023 Seville Marathon, he ran a personal best time of 2:12:17 to move to second on the Chilean all-time list. He was a silver medalist in the marathon at the 2023 Pan American Games in Santiago in October 2023, the first Chilean man to win a medal in the event at the Games, running 2:12:07 to finish runner-up to Peruvian Cristhian Pacheco.

On January 14, 2024, he finished fifth in the Houston Marathon in the United States with a time of 2:08:44, setting a new personal best and Chilean national record. He competed in the marathon at the 2024 Olympic Games in Paris, France.

He competed for Chile at the 2025 World Athletics Championships in Tokyo, Japan.
