= 2025 European Karate Championships – Men's individual kata =

European Karate Championship

Men's individual kata at the 2025 European Karate Championships
- Venue: Karen Demirchyan Complex
- Location: Yerevan, Armenia
- Dates: 7–10 May
- Competitors: 32 from 30 nations

Medalists
gold medal	Enes Özdemir	Turkey
silver medal	Raúl Martín	Spain
bronze medal	Vladimir Mijač	Montenegro
bronze medal	Alessio Ghinami	Italy

The men's individual kata competition at the 2025 European Karate Championships was held from 7 to 10 May 2025.

== Results ==
=== Final ===
Final
(Turkey) Enes Özdemir	42.90
(Spain) Raúl Martín	42.30

=== Top half ===
Round of 32
(Armenia) Mikhail Mkhitaryan	39.10
(Norway) Ruben Vinje Fagerland	38.30
(Switzerland) Yuki Ujihara	40.40
(Georgia (country)) Giorgi Chkhaidze	36.00
(Iceland) Þórður Jökull Henrysson	37.30
Maksim Bareika	38.00
(Ukraine) Yaroslav Fedorov	38.50
(Slovakia) Roman Hrčka	39.90
(Latvia) Kirils Membo	37.40
(Czech Republic) Matteo Tamborlani	36.80
(Turkey) Enes Özdemir	39.90
(Bosnia and Herzegovina) Senaid Veladžić	36.90
(Greece) Lamprinos Markesinis	38.50
(Denmark) David Veistrup	37.50
(Montenegro) Vladimir Mijač	39.70
(Sweden) Anthony Vu	39.40

Round of 16
(Armenia) Mikhail Mkhitaryan	37.20
(Switzerland) Yuki Ujihara	39.30
Maksim Bareika	37.50
(Slovakia) Roman Hrčka	39.10
(Latvia) Kirils Membo	36.30
(Turkey) Enes Özdemir	40.10
(Greece) Lamprinos Markesinis	37.60
(Montenegro) Vladimir Mijač	39.40

Quarterfinals
(Switzerland) Yuki Ujihara	40.30
(Slovakia) Roman Hrčka	40.30
(Turkey) Enes Özdemir	42.60
(Montenegro) Vladimir Mijač	40.80

Semifinals
(Switzerland) Yuki Ujihara	40.30
(Turkey) Enes Özdemir	41.80

=== Bottom half ===
Round of 32
(Germany) Mika Mathes	38.40
(Serbia) Uroš Subota	0
(France) Thomas Klemz	39.80
(Bulgaria) Georgi Matuski	37.40
Varishan Bakirov	38.80
(England) James Harrison	39.80
(Portugal) Artur Neto	39.80
(Spain) Raúl Martín	40.60
(Slovenia) Jure Sluga	35.80
(Croatia) Dino Huić	37.40
(Andorra) Silvio Moreira	34.90
(Austria) Florian Zöchling	36.30
(Poland) Wojciech Niedziela	38.20
(Romania) Petru Comănescu	39.00
(Hungary) Botond Nagy	39.10
(Italy) Alessio Ghinami	39.20

Round of 16
(Serbia) Uroš Subota	39.10
(France) Thomas Klemz	39.00
(England) James Harrison	38.40
(Spain) Raúl Martín	40.70
(Croatia) Dino Huić	38.10
(Austria) Florian Zöchling	36.60
(Romania) Petru Comănescu	40.40
(Italy) Alessio Ghinami	40.50

Quarterfinals
(Serbia) Uroš Subota	39.00
(Spain) Raúl Martín	41.30
(Croatia) Dino Huić	38.30
(Italy) Alessio Ghinami	41.20

Semifinals
(Spain) Raúl Martín	42.10
(Italy) Alessio Ghinami	40.20

=== Repechage ===
Repechage round 1
(Latvia) Kirils Membo	36.70
(Bosnia and Herzegovina) Senaid Veladžić	38.00
(England) James Harrison	37.80
(Portugal) Artur Neto	38.60

Repechage round 2
(Bosnia and Herzegovina) Senaid Veladžić	38.80
(Montenegro) Vladimir Mijač	39.60
(Serbia) Uroš Subota	38.40
(Portugal) Artur Neto	39.10

Bronze medals
(Switzerland) Yuki Ujihara	40.20
(Montenegro) Vladimir Mijač	40.50
(Italy) Alessio Ghinami	43.00
(Portugal) Artur Neto	40.50
