= 2025 European Karate Championships – Men's team kata =

European Karate Championship

Men's team kata at the 2025 European Karate Championships
- Venue: Karen Demirchyan Complex
- Location: Yerevan, Armenia
- Dates: 7, 10 May
- Competitors: 36 from 12 nations

Medalists
gold medal	Raúl Martín; Salvador Cisneros; Iván Martín Montenegro; Alejandro Galán Lacón	Spain
silver medal	Alessio Ghinami; Gianluca Gallo; Mattia Busato; Alessandro Iodice	Italy
bronze medal	Lucas Hoffmann; Tom Peltier; Mahel Stassiaux; Gaetan Couture	France
bronze medal	Enes Özdemir; Emre Vefa Göktaş; Hüseyin Can Göksu	Turkey

The men's team kata competition at the 2025 European Karate Championships was held on 7 and 10 May 2025.

== Results ==
Round of 16
Montenegro	37.90
Switzerland	36.10
France	39.50
Germany	38.10
England	39.30
Croatia	38.40
Hungary	37.60
Czech Republic	37.50

Quarterfinals
Montenegro	38.40
Serbia	37.50
France	40.00
Spain	40.20
England	39.10
Italy	41.60
Hungary	38.40
Turkey	41.10

Semifinals
Montenegro	40.20
Spain	41.70
Italy	40.60
Turkey	39.30

Final
Spain	42.70
Italy	42.40

=== Repechage ===
Bronze medal match
France	41.70
Montenegro	40.20
England	39.80
Turkey	41.80
