= 2026 European Karate Championships – Men's individual kata =

Men's individual kata at the 2026 European Karate Championships
- Venue: Eissporthalle Frankfurt
- Location: Frankfurt, Germany
- Dates: 20, 23 May
- Competitors: 35 from 35 nations

Medalists
| gold medal | Enes Özdemir | Turkey |
| silver medal | Alessio Ghinami | Italy |
| bronze medal | Roman Hrčka | Slovakia |
| bronze medal | Raúl Martín | Spain |

The men's individual kata competition at the 2026 European Karate Championships was held on 20 and 23 May 2026.

== Results ==
=== Finals ===
Semifinals
(Slovakia) Roman Hrčka | 2
(Turkey) Enes Özdemir | 5
(Spain) Raúl Martín | 2
(Italy) Alessio Ghinami | 5

Final
(Turkey) Enes Özdemir | 6
(Italy) Alessio Ghinami | 1

=== Repechage ===
Repechage 1
(Kosovo) Blendi Salihu | 2
(Armenia) Mikhayil Mkhitaryan | 5

Repechage 2
(Armenia) Mikhayil Mkhitaryan | 0
(Montenegro) Vladimir Mijač | 7

Bronze medal
(Montenegro) Vladimir Mijač | 1
(Slovakia) Roman Hrčka | 6

Repechage 1
(Sweden) Anthony Vu | 7
(England) James Harrison | 0

Repechage 2
(Sweden) Anthony Vu | 4
(Switzerland) Yuki Ujihara | 3

Bronze medal
(Sweden) Anthony Vu | 3
(Spain) Raúl Martín | 4

=== Top half ===
==== Section 1 ====
Round of 64
(Latvia) Kirils Membo | 0
(Romania) Petru Comănescu | 7

Round of 32
(Romania) Petru Comănescu | 6
(France) Arthur Noël | 1
(Azerbaijan) Roman Heydarov | 3
(Germany) Morris Tellocke | 4
(Ukraine) Yaroslav Fedorov | 6
(Poland) Wojciech Niedziela | 1
(Iceland) Þórður Jökull Henrysson | 0
(Slovakia) Roman Hrčka | 7

Round of 16
(Romania) Petru Comănescu | 5
(Germany) Morris Tellocke | 2
(Ukraine) Yaroslav Fedorov | 0
(Slovakia) Roman Hrčka | 7

Quarterfinals
(Romania) Petru Comănescu | 2
(Slovakia) Roman Hrčka | 5

==== Section 2 ====
Round of 64
Varishan Bakirov | 2
(Hungary) Ádám Bárdos | 5

Round of 32
(Hungary) Ádám Bárdos | 3
(Montenegro) Vladimir Mijač | 4
Maksim Bareika | 2
(Bosnia and Herzegovina) Senaid Veladžić | 5
(Armenia) Mikhayil Mkhitaryan | 7
(Czech Republic) Filip Pohl | 0
(Kosovo) Blendi Salihu | 0
(Turkey) Enes Özdemir | 7

Round of 16
(Montenegro) Vladimir Mijač | 7
(Bosnia and Herzegovina) Senaid Veladžić | 0
(Armenia) Mikhayil Mkhitaryan | 0
(Turkey) Enes Özdemir | 7

Quarterfinals
(Montenegro) Vladimir Mijač | 3
(Turkey) Enes Özdemir | 4

=== Bottom half ===
==== Section 3 ====
Round of 64
(Portugal) Artur Neto | 7
(Austria) Adam Stelcl | 0

Round of 32
(Portugal) Artur Neto | 7
(Luxembourg) Lucas Chaffort | 0
(Norway) Ruben Vinje Fagerland | 0
(Denmark) David Veistrup | 7
(Greece) Lamprinos Markesinis | 7
(Netherlands) Mitchell Beckers | 0
(Serbia) Aleksandar Boškov | 0
(Spain) Raúl Martín | 7

Round of 16
(Portugal) Artur Neto | 7
(Denmark) David Veistrup | 0
(Greece) Lamprinos Markesinis | 0
(Spain) Raúl Martín | 7

Quarterfinals
(Portugal) Artur Neto | 1
(Spain) Raúl Martín | 6

==== Section 4 ====
Round of 32
(Andorra) Silvio Moreira | 1
(Switzerland) Yuki Ujihara | 6
(Slovenia) Jure Sluga | 0
(Croatia) Matija Relić | 7
(England) James Harrison | 7
(Republic of Ireland) Anes Chaal | 0
(Sweden) Anthony Vu | 0
(Italy) Alessio Ghinami | 7

Round of 16
(Switzerland) Yuki Ujihara | 7
(Croatia) Matija Relić | 0
(England) James Harrison | 0
(Italy) Alessio Ghinami | 7

Quarterfinals
(Switzerland) Yuki Ujihara | 1
(Italy) Alessio Ghinami | 6
