= 2023 World Karate Championships – Men's team kata =

Men's team kata at the 2023 World Karate Championships
- Venue: László Papp Budapest Sports Arena
- Location: Budapest, Hungary
- Dates: 26, 29 October
- Nations: 28
- Teams: 28

Medalists
gold medal	Koji Arimoto; Kazumasa Moto; Ryuji Moto	Japan
silver medal	Emre Vefa Göktaş; Enes Özdemir; Ali Sofuoğlu	Turkey
bronze medal	Salvador Balbuena; Sergio Galán; Rubén García; Raúl Martín	Spain
bronze medal	Gianluca Gallo; Alessio Ghinami; Alessandro Iodice	Italy

The men's team kata competition at the 2023 World Karate Championships was held on 26 and 29 October 2023.

== Results ==
=== Round 1 ===
Rank	Pool 1		Pool 2		Pool 3		Pool 4	
Rank	Team	Total	Team	Total	Team	Total	Team	Total
1	Turkey	41.6	Spain	41.2	Kuwait	41.3	Japan	42.7
2	China	39.0	Hong Kong	39.4	Italy	40.8	Egypt	41.4
3	Czech Republic	38.7	Poland	37.6	Macau	39.4	Colombia	40.2
4	France	38.2	North Macedonia	36.9	Iran	39.4	Germany	39.1
5	Croatia	37.9	Hungary	36.3	Iraq	39.3	Ukraine	37.7
6	Brazil	37.5	Morocco	35.3	Montenegro	39.1	Austria	37.3
7	South Africa	36.9	India		Peru	37.2	Romania	36.6

=== Round 2 ===
Rank	Pool 1		Pool 2	
Rank	Team	Total	Team	Total
1	Turkey	42.3	Japan	43.7
2	Spain	40.9	Italy	42.4
3	Hong Kong	39.2	Kuwait	41.3
4	France	38.8	Iran	41.3
5	China	38.8	Egypt	41.2
6	North Macedonia	36.7	Colombia	40.7
7	Poland	36.3	Germany	39.5
8	Czech Republic	35.7	Macau	38.6

=== Round 3 ===
Rank	Pool 1		Pool 2	
Rank	Team	Total	Team	Total
1	Turkey	41.8	Japan	42.9
2	Spain	41.5	Italy	41.5
3	France	39.6	Kuwait	40.7
4	Hong Kong	39.5	Iran	39.6

=== Finals ===
Final
Turkey	46.1
Japan	46.9

Bronze medal
Spain	45.4
Kuwait	45.3
France	43.0
Italy	45.0
