= Karate at the 2025 World Games – Men's kata =

Men's kata at the 2025 World Games
- Venue: Jianyang Cultural and Sports Centre Gymnasium
- Location: Chengdu, China
- Dates: 8 August
- Competitors: 8 from 8 nations

Medalists
gold medal	Kakeru Nishiyama	Japan
silver medal	Ariel Torres	United States
bronze medal	Alessio Ghinami	Italy

The men's kata competition in karate at the 2025 World Games took place on 8 August 2025 at the Jianyang Cultural and Sports Centre Gymnasium in Chengdu, China.

== Results ==
=== Pool round ===
==== Pool A ====
Pos	Athlete	B	W	L	PF	PA	(United States)	(Egypt)	(Turkey)	(China)
1	Ariel Torres (USA)	3	3	0	126.0	115.1	—	42.1	41.6	42.3
2	Adam El-Lithy (EGY)	3	2	1	118.9	118.3	39.3	—	40.1	39.5
3	Tarık Koç (TUR)	3	1	2	116.5	120.1	37.8	39.4	—	39.3
4	Yang Kangwei (CHN)	3	0	3	113.2	121.1	38.0	36.8	38.4	—

Source: Chengdu 2025

==== Pool B ====
Pos	Athlete	B	W	L	PF	PA	(Japan)	(Italy)	(Sweden)	(Slovakia)
1	Kakeru Nishiyama (JPN)	3	3	0	129.7	121.9	—	44.0	43.0	42.7
2	Alessio Ghinami (ITA)	3	2	1	125.0	123.7	41.6	—	41.7	41.7
3	Anthony Vu (SWE)	3	1	2	121.2	124.0	40.6	40.1	—	40.5
4	Roman Hrčka (SVK)	3	0	3	118.6	124.9	39.7	39.6	39.3	—

Source: Chengdu 2025

=== Finals ===
Semi-finals
Alessio Ghinami (ITA)	41.9
Ariel Torres (USA)	43.6
Adam El-Lithy (EGY)	41.6
Kakeru Nishiyama (JPN)	44.5

Gold medal bout
Ariel Torres (USA)	43.6
Kakeru Nishiyama (JPN)	44.4
Bronze medal bout
Alessio Ghinami (ITA)	43.2
Adam El-Lithy (EGY)	41.2
