= Basque pelota at the 2023 Pan American Games – Women's doubles frontenis =

Women's doubles frontenis at the 2023 Pan American Games
- Venue: Spanish Stadium
- Dates: October 31 - November 5
- Competitors: 10 from 5 nations

Medalists
Gold medal	Ximena Placito; Ariana Cepeda	Mexico
Silver medal	Daniela Darriba; Wendy Durán	Cuba
Bronze medal	Magdalena Muñoz; Natalia Bozzo	Chile

The women's doubles frontenis competition of the basque pelota events at the 2023 Pan American Games was held from October 31 to November 5 at Spanish Stadium in Las Condes, Chile.

== Schedule ==
Date	Time	Round
October 31, 2023 - November 4, 2023	18:00	Group A Matches
November 5, 2023	09:00	Finals

== Results ==
=== Group A ===
Pos	Team	Pld	W	L	GF	GA	GD	PF	PA	PD	Pts	Qualification
1	Ximena Placito (MEX) Ariana Cepeda (MEX)	4	4	0	8	0	+8	120	41	+79	12	Advance to Gold medal match
2	Daniela Darriba (CUB) Wendy Durán (CUB)	4	3	1	6	4	+2	117	105	+12	10	Advance to Gold medal match
3	Magdalena Muñoz (CHI) Natalia Bozzo (CHI) (H)	4	1	3	3	6	−3	81	112	−31	6 (Note: Tied on head-to-head win-loss points (4), and head-to-head game difference (0). Head-to-head point difference: Chile +9, Venezuela +1, Peru −10.)	Advance to Bronze medal match
4	María Borges (VEN) Diana Rangel (VEN)	4	1	3	2	6	−4	72	103	−31	6	Advance to Bronze medal match
5	Nathaly Paredes (PER) Mia Belén Rodríguez (PER)	4	1	3	3	6	−3	87	116	−29	6	

Source: Santiago 2023
(H) Host
Notes:

Date	Time	Player 1	Score	Player 2	Game 1	Game 2	Game 3	Report
October 31	20:03	Ximena Placito (Mexico); Ariana Cepeda (Mexico)	2–0	(Cuba) Daniela Darriba (Cuba) Wendy Durán	15–10	15–6		Report
October 31	20:52	Nathaly Paredes (Peru); Mia Belén Rodríguez (Peru)	0-2	(Venezuela) María Borges (Venezuela) Diana Rangel	11–15	2–15		Report
November 1	19:04	Ximena Placito (Mexico); Ariana Cepeda (Mexico)	2–0	(Peru) Nathaly Paredes (Peru) Mia Belén Rodríguez	15–6	15–7		Report
November 1	20:43	Daniela Darriba (Cuba); Wendy Durán (Cuba)	2–1	(Chile) Magdalena Muñoz (Chile) Natalia Bozzo	15–7	13–15	10–0	Report
November 2	18:10	Magdalena Muñoz (Chile); Natalia Bozzo (Chile)	0–2	(Mexico) Ximena Placito (Mexico) Ariana Cepeda	6–15	0–15		Report
November 2	19:03	María Borges (Venezuela); Diana Rangel (Venezuela)	0–2	(Cuba) Daniela Darriba (Cuba) Wendy Durán	13–15	9–15		Report
November 3	19:51	Magdalena Muñoz (Chile); Natalia Bozzo (Chile)	0–2	(Peru) Nathaly Paredes (Peru) Mia Belén Rodríguez	14–15	9–15		Report
November 3	20:34	María Borges (Venezuela); Diana Rangel (Venezuela)	0–2	(Mexico) Ximena Placito (Mexico) Ariana Cepeda	4–15	2–15		Report
November 4	20:30	Daniela Darriba (Cuba); Wendy Durán (Cuba)	2–1	(Peru) Nathaly Paredes (Peru) Mia Belén Rodríguez	15–11	8–15	10–5	Report
November 4	21:35	María Borges (Venezuela); Diana Rangel (Venezuela)	0–2	(Chile) Magdalena Muñoz (Chile) Natalia Bozzo	12–15	2–15		Report

=== Bronze medal match ===
Date	Time	Player 1	Score	Player 2	Game 1	Game 2	Game 3	Report
November 5	11:12	Magdalena Muñoz (Chile); Natalia Bozzo (Chile)	2–0	(Venezuela) María Borges (Venezuela) Diana Rangel	15–11	15–9		Report

=== Gold medal match ===
Date	Time	Player 1	Score	Player 2	Game 1	Game 2	Game 3	Report
November 5	12:14	Ximena Placito (Mexico); Ariana Cepeda (Mexico)	2-0	(Cuba) Daniela Darriba (Cuba) Wendy Durán	15–6	15–8		Report

== Final standings ==
Rank	Nation	Name
1st place, gold medalist(s)	Mexico	Ximena Placito; Ariana Cepeda
2nd place, silver medalist(s)	Cuba	Daniela Darriba; Wendy Durán
3rd place, bronze medalist(s)	Chile	Magdalena Muñoz; Natalia Bozzo
4	Venezuela	María Borges; Diana Rangel
5	Peru	Nathaly Paredes; Mia Belén Rodríguez
