= Karate at the 2023 Pan American Games – Men's individual kata =

Men's individual kata at the 2023 Pan American Games
- Venue: Contact Sports Center
- Dates: November 3
- Competitors: 8 from 8 nations

Medalists
Gold medal	Ariel Torres	United States
Silver medal	Cleiver Leocadio	Venezuela
Bronze medal	Luca; Impagnatiello	Argentina
Bronze medal	Larry Aracena	Dominican Republic

The men's individual kata competition of the karate events at the 2023 Pan American Games was held on November 3 at the Contact Sports Center (Centro de Entrenamiento de los Deportes de Contacto) in Santiago, Chile.

== Schedule ==
Date	Time	Round
November 3, 2023	11:00	Pool matches
November 3, 2023	16:24	Final

== Results ==
The athletes with the two best scores of each pool advance to the semifinals.

=== Pool A ===
Rk	Athlete	Pld	W	L	Pts.
1	Cleiver Leocadio (VEN)	3	3	0	9
2	Mariano Wong (PER)	3	2	1	6
3	Bruno Conde (BRA)	3	1	2	3
4	Simón Luengo (CHI)	3	0	3	0

	Score	
Simón Luengo (CHI)	37.70–40.20	Mariano Wong (PER)
Bruno Conde (BRA)	38.60–39.80	Cleiver Leocadio (VEN)
Simón Luengo (CHI)	36.90–39.50	Bruno Conde (BRA)
Mariano Wong (PER)	39.00–40.50	Cleiver Leocadio (VEN)
Mariano Wong (PER)	39.70–38.30	Bruno Conde (BRA)
Simón Luengo (CHI)	37.90–40.10	Cleiver Leocadio (VEN)

=== Pool B ===
Rk	Athlete	Pld	W	L	Pts.
1	Ariel Torres (USA)	3	3	0	9
2	Larry Aracena (DOM)	3	2	1	6
3	Luca Impagnatiello (ARG)	3	1	2	3
4	Ahkxel Tepal (MEX)	3	0	3	0

	Score	
Ahkxel Tepal (MEX)	38.50–40.10	Larry Aracena (DOM)
Luca Impagnatiello (ARG)	39.50–41.60	Ariel Torres (USA)
Ahkxel Tepal (MEX)	37.90–38.40	Luca Impagnatiello (ARG)
Larry Aracena (DOM)	39.20–41.50	Ariel Torres (USA)
Larry Aracena (DOM)	40.30–40.10	Luca Impagnatiello (ARG)
Ahkxel Tepal (MEX)	38.00–41.80	Ariel Torres (USA)

=== Finals ===
The results were as follows:

Gold medal match
Cleiver Leocadio (VEN)	40.10
Ariel Torres (USA)	42.60

Bronze medal match
Luca Impagnatiello (ARG)	40.20
Mariano Wong (PER)	39.30
Bronze medal match
Bruno Conde (BRA)	39.20
Larry Aracena (DOM)	39.70
