= Athletics at the 2010 South American Games – Women's 3,000 metre steeplechase =

The Women's 3,000m Steeplechase event at the 2010 South American Games was held on March 23 at 18:00.

== Medalists ==
Gold	Silver	Bronze
Rocío Huillca (Peru) Perú	Jovana de la Cruz (Peru) Perú	Florencia Borelli; Argentina

== Records ==
Standing records prior to the 2010 South American Games
World record	Gulnara Galkina	Russia	8:58.81	Beijing, China	17 August 2008
World Leading	Tebogo Masehla	South Africa	10:10.14	Port Elizabeth, South Africa	19 February 2010
South American record	Sabine Heitling	Brazil	9:41.22	London, Great Britain	25 July 2009
South American U23 record	Sabine Heitling	Brazil	9:41.22	London, Great Britain	25 July 2009

== Results ==
Results were published.

Rank	Athlete	Nationality	Result	Notes
1st place, gold medalist(s)	Rocío Huillca	(Peru) Perú	10:48.53	
2nd place, silver medalist(s)	Jovana de la Cruz	(Peru) Perú	10:52.35	
3rd place, bronze medalist(s)	Florencia Borelli	Argentina	11:10.23	
4	Ingrith Barbosa	Brazil	11:44.90	
5	Viviana Ruiz	Colombia	12:06.39	SB
6	Rafaela Ritz dos Santos	Brazil	12:28.97	

Intermediate times:

1000m	3:24.52	Rocío Huillca (PER)
2000m	7:02.01	Rocío Huillca (PER)

== See also ==
- 2010 South American Under-23 Championships in Athletics
