= Athletics at the 2023 Pan American Games – Women's 20 kilometres walk =

Women's 20 kilometres walk at the 2023 Pan American Games
- Venue: Streets of Santiago
- Dates: October 29
- Competitors: 15 from 9 nations

Medalists
Gold medal	Kimberly García	Peru
Silver medal	Glenda Morejón	Ecuador
Bronze medal	Evelyn Inga	Peru

The women's 20 kilometres walk competition of the athletics events at the 2023 Pan American Games was held on October 29 on the streets of Santiago, Chile. The times of the event was annulled after the course was found to be about 3 km short. Peru's Kimberly García won the gold medal, but due to the error with the course, no athletes received any ranking points towards qualification for the 2024 Summer Olympics.

== Records ==
Pan American Games record	Sandra Arenas (COL)	1:28:03	Athletics at the 2019 Pan American Games – Women's 20 kilometres walk	Lima, Peru	July 27, 2019

== Schedule ==
Date	Time	Round
October 29, 2023	3:00	Final

== Abbreviations ==
- All times shown are in hours:minutes:seconds

KEY:	NR	National record	PB	Personal best	SB	Seasonal best	DQ	Disqualified	DNF	Did not finished

== Results ==
Rank	Athlete	Nation	Time	Notes
1st place, gold medalist(s)	Kimberly García	Peru	Void	All times were annulled due to the course being incorrectly measured.
2nd place, silver medalist(s)	Glenda Morejón	Ecuador	Void	
3rd place, bronze medalist(s)	Evelyn Inga	Peru	Void	
4	Viviane Lyra	Brazil	Void	
5	Alejandra Ortega	Mexico	Void	
6	Magaly Bonilla	Ecuador	Void	
7	Paula Milena Torres	Ecuador	Void	
8	Mayra Quispe	Bolivia	Void	
9	Gabriela De Sousa	Brazil	Void	
10	Natalia Alfonzo	Venezuela	Void	
11	Noelia Vargas	Costa Rica	Void	
12	Mirna Ortiz	Independent Athletes Team	Void	
13	Maria Michta-Coffey	United States	Void	
14	Stephanie Casey	United States	Void	
15	Alegna González	Mexico	DNF	
