= Alessio Ghinami =

Italian karateka (born 2002)

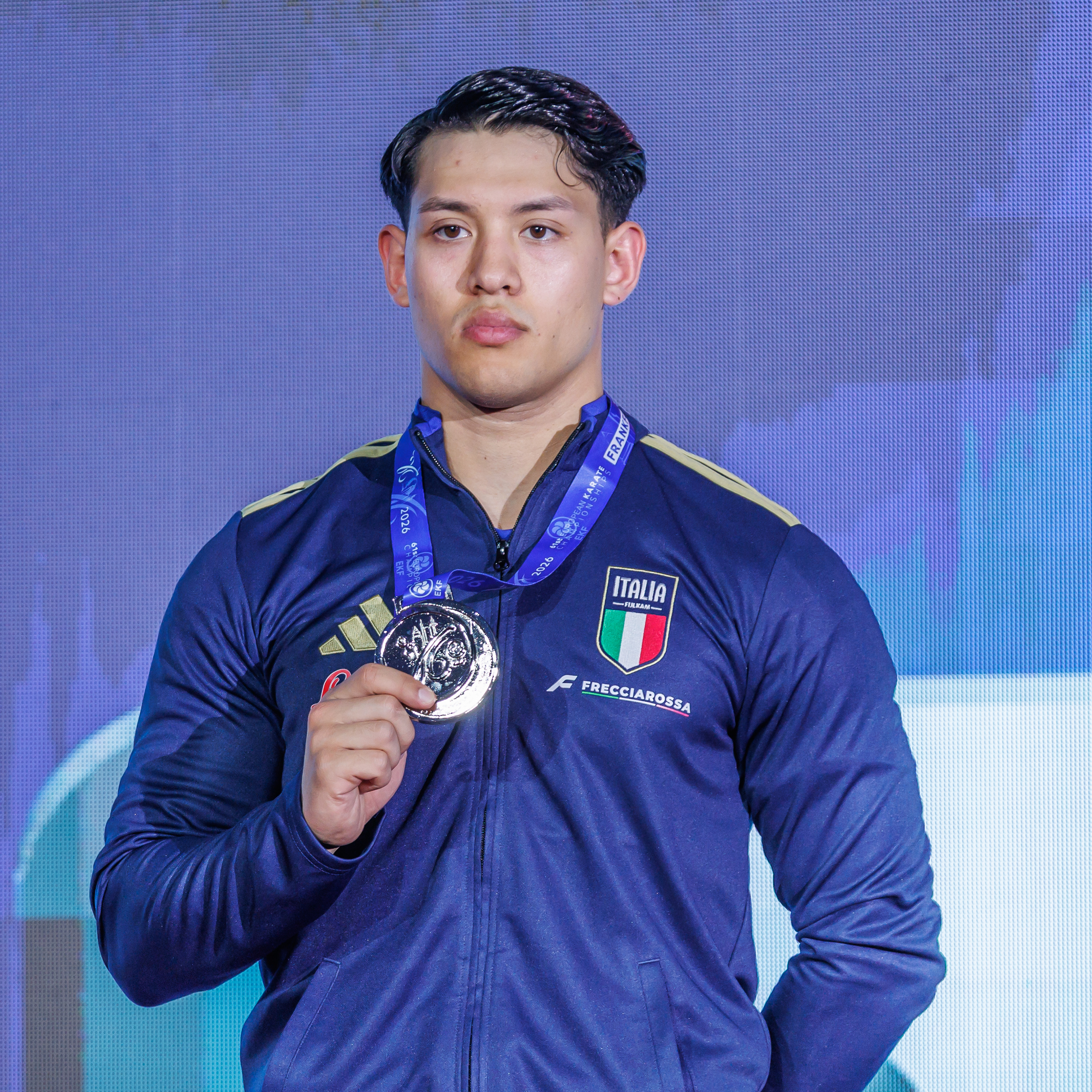

Personal information
- Born: 11 June 2002 (age 24)

Sport
- Country: Italy
- Sport: Karate
- Events: Individual kata; Team kata
Medal record
Men's karate
Representing Italy
World Games
Bronze medal – third place	2025 Chengdu	Individual kata
World Championships
Silver medal – second place	2025 Cairo	Individual kata
Bronze medal – third place	2023 Budapest	Team kata
European Championships
Gold medal – first place	2026 Frankfurt	Team kata
Silver medal – second place	2025 Yerevan	Team kata
Silver medal – second place	2026 Frankfurt	Individual kata
Bronze medal – third place	2024 Zadar	Individual kata
Bronze medal – third place	2024 Zadar	Team kata
Bronze medal – third place	2025 Yerevan	Individual kata

Alessio Ghinami (born 11 June 2002) is an Italian karateka. He won the bronze medal in the men's kata event at the 2025 World Games held in Chengdu, China.

He won the gold medal in the men's kata event at the 2023 Mediterranean Karate Championships held in Tunis, Tunisia. He also won one of the bronze medals in the men's team kata event at the 2023 World Karate Championships held in Budapest, Hungary.

Ghinami is a medalist in the individual and team kata events at the 2024 European Karate Championships held in Zadar, Croatia and at the 2025 European Karate Championships held in Yerevan, Armenia.

== Achievements ==
Year	Competition	Venue	Rank	Event
2023	World Championships	Budapest, Hungary	3rd	Team kata
2024	European Championships	Zadar, Croatia	3rd	Individual kata
2024	European Championships	Zadar, Croatia	3rd	Team kata
2025	European Championships	Yerevan, Armenia	3rd	Individual kata
2025	European Championships	Yerevan, Armenia	2nd	Team kata
2025	World Games	Chengdu, China	3rd	Individual kata
2025	World Championships	Cairo, Egypt	2nd	Individual kata
2026	European Championships	Frankfurt, Germany	2nd	Individual kata
2026	European Championships	Frankfurt, Germany	1st	Team kata
