= Athletics at the 2023 Pan American Games – Men's marathon =

Men's marathon at the 2023 Pan American Games
- Venue: Streets of Santiago
- Dates: October 21
- Competitors: 14 from 9 nations
- Winning time: 2:11:14

Medalists
Gold medal	Cristhian Pacheco	Peru
Silver medal	Hugo Catrileo	Chile
Bronze medal	Luis Ostos	Peru

The men's marathon competition of the athletics events at the 2023 Pan American Games was held on October 21 on the streets of Santiago, Chile.

== Records ==
World record	Kelvin Kiptum (KEN)	2:00:35	Chicago, United States	October 8, 2023
Pan American Games record	Cristhian Pacheco (PER)	2:09:31	Lima, Peru	July 27, 2019

== Schedule ==
Date	Time	Round
October 22, 2023	7:00	Final

== Abbreviations ==
- All times shown are in hours:minutes:seconds

KEY:	NR	National record	PB	Personal best	SB	Seasonal best	DQ	Disqualified	DNF	Did not finished

== Results ==
Rank	Athlete	Nation	Time	Notes
1st place, gold medalist(s)	Cristhian Pacheco	Peru	2:11:14	
2nd place, silver medalist(s)	Hugo Catrileo	Chile	2:12:07	PB
3rd place, bronze medalist(s)	Luis Ostos	Peru	2:12:34	PB
4	Matías Silva	Chile	2:14:16	PB
5	Johnatas de Oliveira	Brazil	2:14:51	
6	Paulo Roberto Paula	Brazil	2:15:20	
7	Álvaro Abreu	Dominican Republic	2:15:27	
8	Patricio Castillo	Mexico	2:20:06	
9	Turner Wiley	United States	2:20:25	SB
10	Derlys Ayala	Paraguay	2:22:29	
11	Hesiquio Flores	Mexico	2:26:20	
	Pedro Gómez	Argentina	DNF	
	Ronal Cuestas	Uruguay	DNF	
	Ernesto Zamora	Uruguay	DNF	
