= Florencia Borelli =

Argentine runner (born 1992)

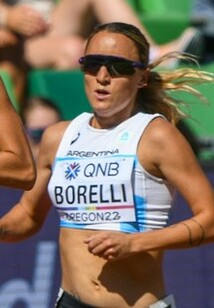
- Borelli at the 2022 World Athletics Championships

Personal information
- Born: 30 October 1992 (age 33)

Sport
- Sport: Athletics
- Event(s): 1500 m, 5000 m
Medal record
Women's athletics
Representing Argentina
Pan American Games
Silver medal – second place	2023 Santiago	Marathon

Florencia Borelli (born 30 October 1992) is an Argentine middle- and long-distance runner. She won a gold medal in the 5000 metres at the 2019 South American Championships in addition to winning multiple other medals at continental level. She is managed by Leonel Manzano and Carlos Roa of Royal Athletic Management & Marketing.

Her twin sister, Mariana Borelli, is also a runner.

== International competitions ==
Year	Competition	Venue	Position	Event	Notes
Representing Argentina
2008	South American Youth Championships	Lima, Peru	1st	2000 m s'chase	7:08.63
2009	World Youth Championships	Brixen, Italy	8th	2000 m s'chase	6:56.67
2009	South American Junior Championships	São Paulo, Brazil	1st	3000 m s'chase	10:50.07
2009	Pan American Junior Championships	Port of Spain, Trinidad	2nd	3000 m s'chase	10:40.46
2010	South American Games; South American U23 Championships	Medellín, Colombia	3rd	3000 m s'chase	11:10.23
2011	South American Championships	Buenos Aires, Argentina	6th	3000 m s'chase	10:54.33
2011	Pan American Junior Championships	Miramar, United States	–	3000 m s'chase	DNF
2012	South American U23 Championships	São Paulo, Brazil	3rd	5000 m	17:00.04
2012	South American U23 Championships	São Paulo, Brazil	1st	10,000 m	35:29.08
2016	Ibero-American Championships	Rio de Janeiro, Brazil	3rd	3000 m	9:10.79
2016	Ibero-American Championships	Rio de Janeiro, Brazil	2nd	5000 m	16:28.66
2017	South American Championships	Asunción, Paraguay	–	5000 m	DNF
2018	World Half Marathon Championships	Valencia, Spain	45th	Half marathon	1:13:10
2018	South American Games	Cochabamba, Bolivia	4th	5000 m	18:01.76
2018	Ibero-American Championships	Trujillo, Peru	3rd	3000 m	9:19.09
2018	Ibero-American Championships	Trujillo, Peru	–	5000 m	DNF
2019	South American Championships	Lima, Peru	4th	1500 m	4:28.22
2019	South American Championships	Lima, Peru	1st	5000 m	15:42.60
2019	Pan American Games	Lima, Peru	9th	5000 m	16:07.75
2019	World Championships	Doha, Qatar	25th (h)	5000 m	15:56.49
2021	South American Championships	Guayaquil, Ecuador	2nd	5000 m	15:47.46
2022	Ibero-American Championships	Torrevella, Spain	1st	Half marathon	1:11:59
2022	World Championships	Eugene, United States	32nd (h)	5000 m	16:06.36
2022	South American Games	Asunción, Paraguay	1st	10,000 m	33:43.37
2023	Pan American Games	Santiago, Chile	2nd	Marathon	2:27:29
2025	South American Championships	Mar del Plata, Argentina	2nd	10,000 m	34:08.01

== Personal bests ==
Outdoor

- 1500 metres – 4:15.26 (Braga 2023)
- 3000 metres – 8:53.89 (Memphis 2022)
- 5000 metres – 15:23.83 (Manchester 2022) NR
- 10,000 metres – 31:33.07 (San Juan Capistrano 2024) NR
- 10 kilometres – 32:48 (Buenos Aires 2023)
- 15 kilometres – 55:52 (Mar del Plata 2017)
- Half marathon – 1:09:21 (Buenos Aires 2025) NR
