= Athletics at the 2023 Pan American Games – Women's marathon =

Women's marathon at the 2023 Pan American Games
- Venue: Streets of Santiago
- Dates: October 21
- Competitors: 12 from 8 nations
- Winning time: 2:27:12 GR

Medalists
Gold medal	Citlali Cristian	Mexico
Silver medal	Florencia Borelli	Argentina
Bronze medal	Gladys Tejeda	Peru

The women's marathon competition of the athletics events at the 2023 Pan American Games was held on October 22 on the streets of Santiago, Chile.

== Records ==
World record	Tigst Assefa (ETH)	2:11:53	Berlin, Germany	September 24, 2023
Pan American Games record	Gladys Tejeda (PER)	2:30:55	Lima, Peru	July 27, 2019

== Schedule ==
Date	Time	Round
October 22, 2023	7:15	Final

== Abbreviations ==
- All times shown are in hours:minutes:seconds

KEY:	NR	National record	PB	Personal best	SB	Seasonal best	DQ	Disqualified	DNF	Did not finished

== Results ==
Rank	Athlete	Nation	Time	Notes
1st place, gold medalist(s)	Citlali Cristian	Mexico	2:27:12	GR
2nd place, silver medalist(s)	Florencia Borelli	Argentina	2:27:29	
3rd place, bronze medalist(s)	Gladys Tejeda	Peru	2:30:39	SB
4	Aydee Loayza	Peru	2:30:55	
5	Rosa Chacha	Ecuador	2:31:01	
6	Risper Biyaki	Mexico	2:32:13	
7	Giselle Alvarez	Chile	2:37:21	
8	Valdilene dos Santos	Brazil	2:38:40	
9	Andreia Hessel	Brazil	2:39:53	SB
10	Danica Kusanovic	Chile	2:42:31	PB
11	Beverly Ramos	Puerto Rico	2:46:22	
12	Fatima Romero	Paraguay	2:56:56	
