= Santino Basaldella =

Argentine surfer (born 2004)

Personal information
- Full name: Santino Luca Basaldella
- Nationality: Argentina
- Born: 15 December 2004 (age 20); Rosario, Argentina

Sport
- Sport: Surfing

Olympic medal record

Men's surfing

Representing Argentina

Pan American Games
Bronze medal – third place	2023 Santiago	Men

South American Beach Games
Bronze medal – third place	2023 Santa Marta	Men

Santino Luca Basaldella (born 15 December 2004) is an Argentine surfer. He received a bronze medal in the 2023 Pan American Games.
