= Luis Ostos =

Peruvian long-distance runner

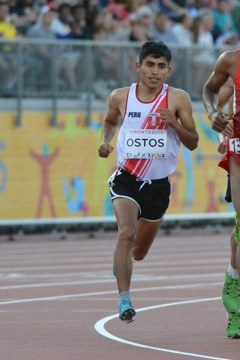
- Ostos at the 2015 Pan American Games in Toronto, Canada.

Personal information
- Full name: Luis Fernando Ostos Cruz
- Born: 9 August 1992 (age 33) Uchiza District, Peru

Sport
- Sport: Athletics
Medal record
Representing Peru
Men's athletics
Pan American Games
Bronze medal – third place	2023 Santiago	Marathon

Luis Fernando Ostos Cruz (born 9 August 1992) is a Peruvian long-distance runner.

== Biography ==
Cruz represented Peru at the 2016 Summer Olympics in Rio de Janeiro, in the men's 10,000 metres.

He won a bronze medal in marathon at the 2023 Pan American Games.
