= Sanoa Dempfle-Olin =

Canadian surfer (born 2005)

Personal information
- Nationality: Canadian
- Born: July 3, 2005 (age 21) Tofino, British Columbia, Canada

Sport
- Sport: Surfing
Medal record
Women's Surfing
Representing Canada
Pan American Games
Silver medal – second place	2023 Santiago	Shortboard

Sanoa Dempfle-Olin (born July 3, 2005) is a Canadian surfer.

== Career ==
At just 18 years old, Dempfle-Olin has already achieved several notable milestones in her surfing career. Her accomplishments include:

- 1st Place - Queen of the Peak (2016)
- 1st Place - Rip Curl Pro Open (2017)
- 2nd Place - Queen of the Peak (2019)
- 2nd Place - Rip Curl Pro Open (2022)
- 2nd Place - SLO Cal Open (2023)
- 1st Place - WSL Qualifying Series (2023)
- 2nd Place - Pan American Games (2023)

In October 2023, she was named to Canada's 2023 Pan American Games team. At the 2023 Pan American Games, Dempfle-Olin won silver in the event Shortboard. By winning the silver medal, she qualified for the 2024 Summer Olympics.

In May 2024, Dempfle-Olin was named officially named to Canada's Olympic team. Dempfle-Olin became Canada's first ever surfer to compete at the Olympics.
