= Cristhian Pacheco =

Peruvian long-distance runner (born 1993)

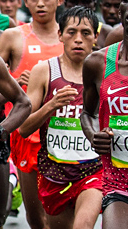
- Pacheco at the 2016 Olympics

Personal information
- Full name: Cristhian Simeon Pacheco Mendoza
- Born: 26 May 1993 (age 33) Huancayo, Peru
- Height: 1.80 m (5 ft 11 in)
- Weight: 62 kg (137 lb)

Sport
- Sport: Athletics
- Event: Marathon
Medal record
Pan American Games
Gold medal – first place	2019 Lima	Marathon
Gold medal – first place	2023 Santiago	Marathon

Cristhian Simeon Pacheco Mendoza (born 26 May 1993) is a Peruvian long-distance runner who specialises in the marathon.

== Running career ==
Pacheco competed in the men's marathon at the 2016, 2020, and 2024 Summer Olympics.

He won the Marathon at the 2019 Pan American Games which was held in Lima, Peru. This race set a new Pan American Games record with a time of 2:09.31. It was also the Peruvian national record.

On February 19, 2023, he placed 11th in the Valencia Marathon in a time 2:07:38 breaking his own personal best, and the national record, by nearly 2 minutes.

== Statistics ==
Information from World Athletics profile.

Personal bests

Surface	Event	Time	Venue	Date	Notes
Outdoor track	10,000m	28:56.88	Portland, OR	June 10, 2022	
Road	Half Marathon	1:02:50	Lima, PER	May 1, 2022	
Road	Marathon	2:07:38	Sevilla, ESP	February 19, 2023	NR

International Competition Results

Year	Meet	Location	Event	Place	Time
2014	IAAF World Half Marathon Championships	Copenhagen, Denmark	Half Marathon	85th	1:06:07
2014	South American U23 Championships	Lima, Peru	10,000m	2nd	30:18.24
2016	Summer Olympics	Rio de Janeiro, Brazil	Marathon	52nd	2:18:41
2017	South American Championships	Asunción, Paraguay	10,000m		DNF
2018	IAAF World Half Marathon Championships	Valencia, Spain	Half Marathon	50th	1:03:15
2019	Pan American Games	Lima, Peru	Marathon	1st	2:09:31
2021	Summer Olympics	Tokyo, Japan	Marathon	59th	2:22:12

== Personal life ==
He is a younger brother of Raúl Pacheco, also a marathoner.
