= Enes Özdemir =

Turkish karateka (born 2002)

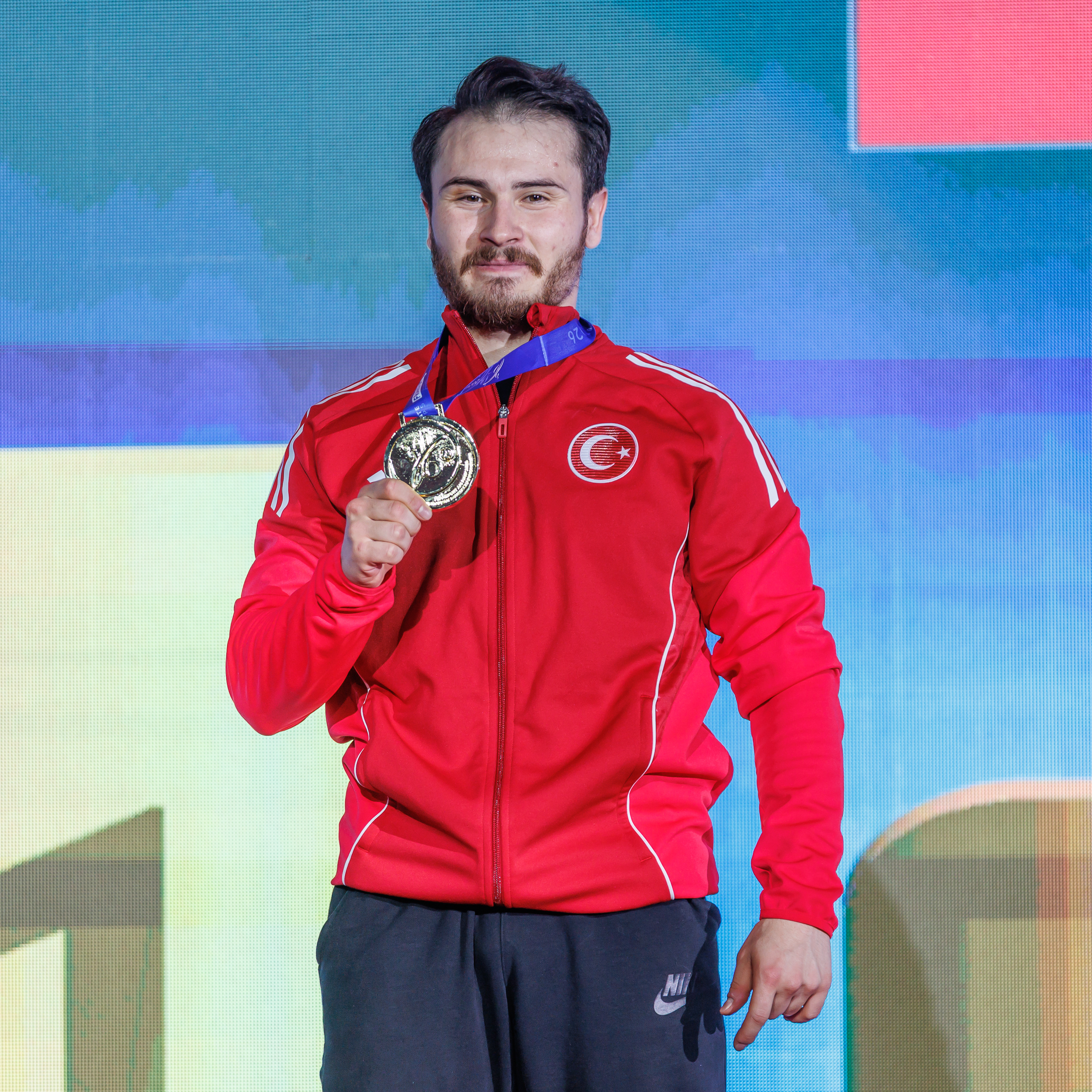
- Born: Enes Özdemir; 9 March 2002 (age 24); Ankara, Turkey
- Nationality: Turkish
- Style: Karate Kata
- Team: EGO Sports Club

Enes Özdemir (born 2002) is a Turkish karateka competing in the kata.

== Career ==
He won the gold medal in the Team kata event at the 2021 European Karate Championships held in Poreč, Croatia.

He won the bronze medal in the Team kata event at the 2021 World Karate Championships held in Dubai, United Arab Emirates.
