= Surfing at the 2023 Pan American Games =

- Surfing pictogram
- Venue: Punta de Lobos
- Start date: October 24, 2023
- End date: October 30, 2023
- No. of events: 8 (4 men, 4 women)
- Competitors: 88 from TBD nations

Surfing competitions at the 2023 Pan American Games are scheduled to be held between October 24 and 30, 2023 at Punta de Lobos beach in the Pichilemu commune of Chile.

8 medal events are scheduled to be contested (four per each gender). A total of 88 surfers will qualify to compete at the games.

The longboard event will be used as a qualifier for the 2024 Summer Olympics in Paris, France.

== Qualification ==
A total of 88 surfers will qualify across various qualification tournaments. The host nation Chile, will be automatically be allocated ten quota spots across the eight events. In the shortboard category, a country can enter two athletes, with a maximum one in all other categories. A country can enter a maximum ten surfers (five per gender). An athlete can only qualify one quota for their country.

== Participating nations ==
A total of 9 countries qualified athletes so far.

- Argentina (2)
- Brazil (9)
- Chile (10)
- Colombia (1)
- Costa Rica (1)
- Mexico (1)
- Peru (10)
- Puerto Rico (1)
- United States (4)

== Medal summary ==
=== Medal table ===
* Host nation (Chile)

Rank	NOC's	Gold	Silver	Bronze	Total
1	Peru	3	1	2	6
2	United States	3	0	0	3
3	Brazil	1	3	1	5
4	Colombia	1	0	0	1
5	Costa Rica	0	1	2	3
6	Canada	0	1	1	2
7	Chile*	0	1	0	1
7	Venezuela	0	1	0	1
9	Argentina	0	0	1	1
9	Puerto Rico	0	0	1	1
Totals (10 entries)		8	8	8	24

=== Medalists ===
==== Men's events ====
Event	Gold	Silver	Bronze
Shortboard	Lucca Mesinas; Peru	Francisco Bellorín; Venezuela	Miguel Tudela; Peru
SUP surf	Zane Schweitzer; United States	Luiz Diniz; Brazil	Finn Spencer; Canada
SUP race	Connor Baxter; United States	Itzel Delgado; Peru	Santino Basaldella; Argentina
Longboard	Benoit Clemente; Peru	Rafael Cortéz; Chile	Carlos Bahia; Brazil

==== Women's events ====
Event	Gold	Silver	Bronze
Shortboard	Tatiana Weston-Webb; Brazil	Sanoa Dempfle-Olin; Canada	Leilani McGonagle; Costa Rica
SUP surf	Izzi Gómez; Colombia	Aline Adisaka; Brazil	Vania Torres; Peru
SUP race	Candice Appleby; United States	Jennifer Kalmbach; Costa Rica	Mariecarmen Rivera; Puerto Rico
Longboard	María Fernanda Reyes; Peru	Chloé Calmon; Brazil	Lia Reyes Dias; Costa Rica

== See also ==
- Surfing at the 2024 Summer Olympics
