= Punta de Lobos =

- Town
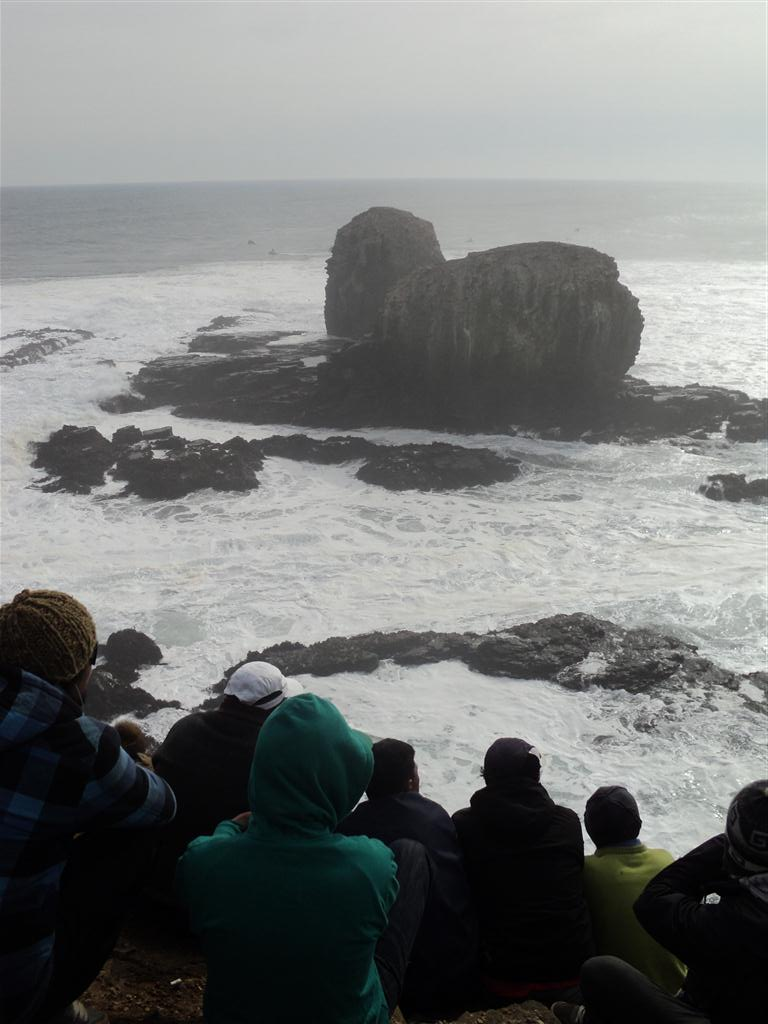
- The Rocks of Punta de Lobos during a surf championship in 2011
- Country: Chile
- Region: (O'Higgins Region) O'Higgins
- Province: Cardenal Caro
- Commune: Pichilemu

Punta de Lobos (English: Sea-lions Point) is a Chilean town, administratively part of the commune of Pichilemu, whose urban centre is 6 kilometres (3.7 mi) north), in the Cardenal Caro Province, O'Higgins Region.

The beach of Punta de Lobos, about 200 km south of Valparaíso, is well-known internationally for being a good place for surfing and the practice of kiteboarding. Its waves vary between two and three meters high, allowing surfers of different skill levels to select their waves. The town of Punta de Lobos is characterized by its fine gray sand, and is surrounded by cliffs which are 50 metres high. Its odd rocks (Rocas de Punta de Lobos) are frequented by sea-lions.

Punta de Lobos was nominated as the 7th World Surfing Reserve by Save The Waves Coalition in 2013.
