= 2021 EUBC Youth European Boxing Championships =

- Venue: Mediterranean Sport Center
- Location: Budva, Montenegro
- Dates: 15–23 October
- Competitors: 339 from 38 nations

The 2021 EUBC Youth European Boxing Championships were held in Budva, Montenegro from 15 to 23 October 2021.

To attend in the EUBC European Confederation Youth Boxing Championships were eligible boxers who were born in 2003 and in 2004.

The event was introduced also the new youth weight categories, the girls can attend in 12 while the boys in 13 different weight classes in Montenegro. The 48kg, 50kg, 52kg, 54kg, 57kg, 60kg, 63kg, 66kg, 70kg, 75kg, 81kg and +81kg were official for the women’s youth boxers in Budva. The men’s youth boxers could attend at the 48kg, 51kg, 54kg, 57kg, 60kg, 63.5kg, 67kg, 71kg, 75kg, 80kg, 86kg, 92kg and +92kg weight categories.

== Schedule ==
Preliminary rounds
Quarterfinals
Semifinals
Final

Weight category	15 Oct	16 Oct	17 Oct	18 Oct	19 Oct	20 Oct	21 Oct	22 Oct	23 Oct	Total
Men
48kg			3			4	2		1	10
51kg			6			4	2		1	13
54kg	1			8		4	2		1	16
57kg	5			8		4	2		1	20
60kg	6			8		4	2		1	21
63.5kg	3			8		4	2		1	18
67kg		5		8		4	2		1	20
71kg		11		8		4	2		1	26
75kg	6	8				4	2		1	21
80kg		7				4	2		1	14
86kg		6				4	2		1	13
92kg		3				4	2		1	10
+92kg			4			4	2		1	11
Women
48kg			1		4		2		1	8
50kg			6		4		2		1	13
52kg					4		2		1	7
54kg			3		4		2		1	10
57kg			3		4		2		1	10
60kg			7		4		2		1	14
63kg			4		4		2		1	11
66kg			1		4		2		1	8
70kg					2		2		1	5
75kg			1		4		2		1	8
81kg					1		2		1	4
+81kg							2		1	3
Total	21	40	39	48	39	52	50	0	25	314

== Number of Entries by Team ==
Team	Men													Women												Total
Team	48kg	51kg	54kg	57kg	60kg	63.5kg	67kg	71kg	75kg	80kg	86kg	92kg	+92kg	48kg	50kg	52kg	54kg	57kg	60kg	63kg	66kg	70kg	75kg	81kg	+81kg	Total
Albania	●					●	●			●																4
Armenia	●	●	●	●	●	●	●	●	●		●	●	●			●			●	●						15
Azerbaijan	●	●	●	●	●	●		●			●	●														9
Belarus			●	●	●	●		●	●		●	●		●			●		●	●						12
Belgium									●																	1
Bosnia and Herzegovina								●	●				●							●						4
Bulgaria				●	●	●			●	●	●		●													7
Croatia			●		●	●	●	●	●																	6
Cyprus		●																	●							2
Czech Republic			●			●	●	●	●	●	●		●				●		●							10
Denmark					●		●								●											3
Estonia								●	●	●																3
Finland		●			●			●							●			●	●							6
Georgia			●	●	●	●	●	●	●	●									●							9
Germany			●	●	●			●	●				●		●					●	●	●				10
Greece				●	●		●	●	●	●		●			●		●						●			10
Hungary	●	●	●	●	●	●	●	●	●		●	●	●	●	●	●	●	●	●		●		●			20
Israel	●	●		●	●	●	●	●	●			●										●	●			11
Italy		●	●	●	●			●	●	●	●			●	●	●	●	●	●		●		●			16
Kosovo				●			●	●			●															4
Latvia			●	●	●		●			●																5
Lithuania						●		●	●		●		●							●					●	7
Moldova	●	●	●	●	●	●	●	●	●		●		●						●							12
Montenegro				●	●		●	●		●		●						●								7
Netherlands										●								●		●						3
North Macedonia		●				●		●					●													4
Norway															●								●			2
Poland	●	●		●	●	●	●	●		●	●	●		●	●	●	●		●	●	●	●	●	●	●	21
Romania		●	●	●	●	●	●	●	●					●	●		●		●		●		●	●		15
Russia	●	●	●	●	●	●	●	●	●	●	●	●	●	●	●	●	●	●	●	●	●	●	●	●	●	25
Serbia				●			●	●	●	●					●			●		●	●					9
Slovakia			●				●	●																		3
Slovenia									●																	1
Spain	●		●	●	●	●	●							●	●	●	●	●								11
Sweden																		●	●	●						3
Switzerland								●																		1
Turkey	●	●	●	●	●	●	●	●	●	●	●	●	●	●	●	●	●	●	●	●	●	●		●		23
Ukraine	●	●	●	●	●	●	●	●	●	●	●	●	●	●	●	●	●	●	●	●	●	●	●	●	●	25
Total	11	14	17	21	22	19	21	27	22	15	14	11	12	9	14	8	11	11	15	12	9	6	9	5	4	339

== Medalists ==
Event	Gold	Silver	Bronze
Men
Minimumweight (48kg)	Rafael Lozano Serrano (ESP)	Nikita Polukhin (RUS)	Dumitrii Vieru (MDA)
Minimumweight (48kg)	Rafael Lozano Serrano (ESP)	Nikita Polukhin (RUS)	Ariol Zeneli (ALB)
Flyweight (51kg)	Henrik Sahakyan (ARM)	Ruslan Pirov (RUS)	Ylie Argatu (MDA)
Flyweight (51kg)	Henrik Sahakyan (ARM)	Ruslan Pirov (RUS)	Nijat Huseynov (AZE)
Bantamweight (54kg)	Aider Abduraimov (UKR)	Giorgi Sajaia (GEO)	Juan Pantoja Moreno (ESP)
Bantamweight (54kg)	Aider Abduraimov (UKR)	Giorgi Sajaia (GEO)	Kamil Babayev (AZE)
Featherweight (57kg)	Garoglan Khandzhanov (RUS)	Manvel Petrosyan (ARM)	Ruslan Tsykalo (UKR)
Featherweight (57kg)	Garoglan Khandzhanov (RUS)	Manvel Petrosyan (ARM)	Daniel Kirilov (BUL)
Lightweight (60kg)	Radoslav Rosenov (BUL)	Alexey Shendrik (RUS)	Erik Israyelyan (ARM)
Lightweight (60kg)	Radoslav Rosenov (BUL)	Alexey Shendrik (RUS)	Enrico Kliesch (GER)
Light Welterweight (63.5kg)	Lasha Gagnidze (GEO)	Matsvei Davydau (BLR)	Andrei Musteţ (ROU)
Light Welterweight (63.5kg)	Lasha Gagnidze (GEO)	Matsvei Davydau (BLR)	Ștefan Vozneacovschi (MDA)
Welterweight (67kg)	Bozorboi Matyakubov (UKR)	Frank Martínez Bernad (ESP)	Aleksandr Zyrianov (RUS)
Welterweight (67kg)	Bozorboi Matyakubov (UKR)	Frank Martínez Bernad (ESP)	Damjan Liješević (MNE)
Light Middleweight (71kg)	Danii Prokudin (RUS)	Đorđe Smolović (MNE)	Giorgi Zhorzholiani (GEO)
Light Middleweight (71kg)	Danii Prokudin (RUS)	Đorđe Smolović (MNE)	Viacheslav Bryhadenko (UKR)
Middleweight (75kg)	William Cholov (BUL)	Akim Pavliukov (RUS)	Rastko Simić (SRB)
Middleweight (75kg)	William Cholov (BUL)	Akim Pavliukov (RUS)	Oleksandr Balabin (UKR)
Light Heavyweight (80kg)	Aleksandr Grunichev (RUS)	Matvii Razhba (UKR)	Anton Vinogradov (EST)
Light Heavyweight (80kg)	Aleksandr Grunichev (RUS)	Matvii Razhba (UKR)	Corrie van de Pavert (NED)
Cruiserweight (86g)	Henrik Tshghrikyan (ARM)	David Polák (CZE)	Narūnas Grebnevas (LTU)
Cruiserweight (86g)	Henrik Tshghrikyan (ARM)	David Polák (CZE)	Andrei Masalau (BLR)
Heavyweight (92kg)	Said Almazov (RUS)	Manuchar Kriheli (ISR)	Mikita Nahirny (BLR)
Heavyweight (92kg)	Said Almazov (RUS)	Manuchar Kriheli (ISR)	Đorđe Lainović (MNE)
Super Heavyweight (+92kg)	Nikita Putilov (GER)	Dmytro Babliuk (UKR)	Kiril Borisov (BUL)
Super Heavyweight (+92kg)	Nikita Putilov (GER)	Dmytro Babliuk (UKR)	Nicolai Burdiuja (MDA)
Women
Minimumweight (48kg)	Anna Kostina (RUS)	Petra Mezei (HUN)	Laura Barceló Calderón (ESP)
Minimumweight (48kg)	Anna Kostina (RUS)	Petra Mezei (HUN)	Nurselen Yalgattekin (TUR)
Light Flyweight (50kg)	Sophia Mazzoni (ITA)	Sara Čirković (SRB)	Arina Vostrikova (RUS)
Light Flyweight (50kg)	Sophia Mazzoni (ITA)	Sara Čirković (SRB)	Sofie Vinther Rosshaug (DEN)
Flyweight (52kg)	Valeriia Linkova (RUS)	Gamze Soğuksu (TUR)	Nikola Prymaczenko (POL)
Flyweight (52kg)	Valeriia Linkova (RUS)	Gamze Soğuksu (TUR)	Daria-Olha Hutarina (UKR)
Bantamweight (54kg)	Antonia Filippa Giannakopoulou (GRE)	Kevser Tütüncü (TUR)	Iryna Melnyk (UKR)
Bantamweight (54kg)	Antonia Filippa Giannakopoulou (GRE)	Kevser Tütüncü (TUR)	Anastasiia Kirienko (RUS)
Featherweight (57kg)	Bojana Gojković (MNE)	Alina Pushkar (RUS)	Kateryna Bodnarchuk (UKR)
Featherweight (57kg)	Bojana Gojković (MNE)	Alina Pushkar (RUS)	Zehra Milli (SWE)
Lightweight (60kg)	Nadezhda Golubeva (RUS)	Elida Kocharyan (ARM)	Loreadana-Andreea Marin (ROU)
Lightweight (60kg)	Nadezhda Golubeva (RUS)	Elida Kocharyan (ARM)	Cristina Chiper (MDA)
Light Welterweight (63kg)	Iulia Starchenko (RUS)	Jenin Heck (GER)	Ece Asude Deniz (TUR)
Light Welterweight (63kg)	Iulia Starchenko (RUS)	Jenin Heck (GER)	Lucin Seropian (SWE)
Welterweight (66kg)	Azalia Amineva (RUS)	Anna Sezko (UKR)	Ayşe Doğan (TUR)
Welterweight (66kg)	Azalia Amineva (RUS)	Anna Sezko (UKR)	Lütfiye Tutal (GER)
Light Middleweight (70kg)	Veronika Nakota (UKR)	Anastasiia Demurchian (RUS)	Lia Pukkila (ISR)
Light Middleweight (70kg)	Veronika Nakota (UKR)	Anastasiia Demurchian (RUS)	Barbara Marcinkowska (POL)
Middleweight (75kg)	Sunniva Hofstad (NOR)	Vasiliki Stavridou (GRE)	Daria Bazhenova (RUS)
Middleweight (75kg)	Sunniva Hofstad (NOR)	Vasiliki Stavridou (GRE)	Chiara Saraiello (ITA)
Light Heavyweight (81kg)	Maria Proskunova (RUS)	Raisa Piskun (UKR)	Maria Livia Botică (ROU)
Light Heavyweight (81kg)	Maria Proskunova (RUS)	Raisa Piskun (UKR)	Senanur Kocaoğlu (TUR)
Heavyweight (+81kg)	Tatiana Bogdanova (RUS)	Weronika Bochen (POL)	Kamilė Aglinskaitė (LTU)
Heavyweight (+81kg)	Tatiana Bogdanova (RUS)	Weronika Bochen (POL)	Nina Karpenko (UKR)

== Medal table ==
* Host nation (Montenegro)

Men
Rank	Nation	Gold	Silver	Bronze	Total
1	Russia	4	4	1	9
2	Ukraine	2	2	3	7
3	Armenia	2	1	1	4
4	Bulgaria	2	0	2	4
5	Georgia	1	1	1	3
5	Spain	1	1	1	3
7	Germany	1	0	1	2
8	Belarus	0	1	2	3
8	Montenegro*	0	1	2	3
10	Czech Republic	0	1	0	1
10	Israel	0	1	0	1
12	Moldova	0	0	4	4
13	Azerbaijan	0	0	2	2
14	Albania	0	0	1	1
14	Estonia	0	0	1	1
14	Lithuania	0	0	1	1
14	Netherlands	0	0	1	1
14	Romania	0	0	1	1
14	Serbia	0	0	1	1
Totals (19 entries)		13	13	26	52

* Host nation (Montenegro)

Women
Rank	Nation	Gold	Silver	Bronze	Total
1	Russia	7	2	3	12
2	Ukraine	1	2	4	7
3	Greece	1	1	0	2
4	Italy	1	0	1	2
5	Montenegro*	1	0	0	1
5	Norway	1	0	0	1
7	Turkey	0	2	4	6
8	Poland	0	1	2	3
9	Germany	0	1	1	2
10	Armenia	0	1	0	1
10	Hungary	0	1	0	1
10	Serbia	0	1	0	1
13	Romania	0	0	2	2
13	Sweden	0	0	2	2
15	Denmark	0	0	1	1
15	Israel	0	0	1	1
15	Lithuania	0	0	1	1
15	Moldova	0	0	1	1
15	Spain	0	0	1	1
Totals (19 entries)		12	12	24	48

* Host nation (Montenegro)

Overall
Rank	Nation	Gold	Silver	Bronze	Total
1	Russia	11	6	4	21
2	Ukraine	3	4	7	14
3	Armenia	2	2	1	5
4	Bulgaria	2	0	2	4
5	Germany	1	1	2	4
5	Montenegro*	1	1	2	4
5	Spain	1	1	2	4
8	Georgia	1	1	1	3
9	Greece	1	1	0	2
10	Italy	1	0	1	2
11	Norway	1	0	0	1
12	Turkey	0	2	4	6
13	Belarus	0	1	2	3
13	Poland	0	1	2	3
15	Israel	0	1	1	2
15	Serbia	0	1	1	2
17	Czech Republic	0	1	0	1
17	Hungary	0	1	0	1
19	Moldova	0	0	5	5
20	Romania	0	0	3	3
21	Azerbaijan	0	0	2	2
21	Lithuania	0	0	2	2
21	Sweden	0	0	2	2
24	Albania	0	0	1	1
24	Denmark	0	0	1	1
24	Estonia	0	0	1	1
24	Netherlands	0	0	1	1
Totals (27 entries)		25	25	50	100

== Draws ==
=== Men's ===
==== Minimumweight (48kg) ====
First round
Özkan Özbay (TUR)	Bye
Rafael Lozano Serrano (ESP)	4
Tumas Tovmasyan (ARM)	1
Dumitrii Vieru (MDA)	Bye
Imre Bernáth (HUN)	Bye
Oskar Jędrysiak (POL)	Bye
Ariol Zeneli (ALB)	3
Sofian El Okby (ISR)	2
Denys Bilenkyi (UKR)	0
Tural Sarıyev (AZE)	5
Nikita Polukhin (RUS)	Bye

Quarterfinals
Özkan Özbay (TUR)	0
Rafael Lozano Serrano (ESP)	5
Dumitrii Vieru (MDA)	3
Imre Bernáth (HUN)	0
Oskar Jędrysiak (POL)	0
Ariol Zeneli (ALB)	5
Tural Sarıyev (AZE)	0
Nikita Polukhin (RUS)	5

Semifinals
Rafael Lozano Serrano (ESP)	RSC
Dumitrii Vieru (MDA)
Ariol Zeneli (ALB)	0
Nikita Polukhin (RUS)	5

Final
Rafael Lozano Serrano (ESP)	4
Nikita Polukhin (RUS)	1

==== Flyweight (51kg) ====
First round
Artturi Pechuev (FIN)	Bye
Ylie Argatu (MDA)	RSC
Michalis Pettemeridis (CYP)
Dominik Énekes (HUN)
Henrik Sahakyan (ARM)	RSC
Jakub Krzpiet (POL)	0
Mehmethan Çınar (TUR)	5
Farid Hreish (ISR)	0
Maksym Rudyk (UKR)	5
Ruslan Pirov (RUS)	5
Saly Marian Palapiuc (ROU)	0
Nijat Huseynov (AZE)	5
Alessio Camiolo (ITA)	0
Hadi Shehabi (MKD)	Bye

Quarterfinals
Artturi Pechuev (FIN)	1
Ylie Argatu (MDA)	4
Henrik Sahakyan (ARM)	5
Mehmethan Çınar (TUR)	0
Maksym Rudyk (UKR)	2
Ruslan Pirov (RUS)	3
Nijat Huseynov (AZE)	5
Hadi Shehabi (MKD)	0

Semifinals
Ylie Argatu (MDA)	2
Henrik Sahakyan (ARM)	3
Ruslan Pirov (RUS)	4
Nijat Huseynov (AZE)	1

Final
Henrik Sahakyan (ARM)	3
Ruslan Pirov (RUS)	2

==== Bantamweight (54kg) ====
First round
Tomislav Letinić (CRO)	Bye
J. Pantoja Moreno (ESP)	5
Kruzitó Kovács (HUN)	0
Suren Rubenyan (ARM)	Bye
Mihai Taranu (MDA)	Bye
Kristaps Lejnieks (LAT)	Bye
Aider Abduraimov (UKR)	Bye
Samuel Zupko (SVK)	Bye
Jozef Slepčík (CZE)	Bye
Kamil Babayev (AZE)	Bye
Fabio Crobeddu (ITA)	Bye
U. Smalouski (BLR)	Bye
G. M. Ghinoiu (ROU)	Bye
Tolga Kaya (TUR)	Bye
Denis Bril (GER)	Bye
Giorgi Sajaia (GEO)	Bye
Danila Shutov (RUS)	Bye

Second round
Tomislav Letinić (CRO)	0
J. Pantoja Moreno (ESP)	5
Suren Rubenyan (ARM)	5
Mihai Taranu (MDA)	0
Kristaps Lejnieks (LAT)	0
Aider Abduraimov (UKR)	5
Samuel Zupko (SVK)	3
Jozef Slepčík (CZE)	2
Kamil Babayev (AZE)	5
Fabio Crobeddu (ITA)	0
U. Smalouski (BLR)	5
G. M. Ghinoiu (ROU)	0
Tolga Kaya (TUR)	4
Denis Bril (GER)	1
Giorgi Sajaia (GEO)	4
Danila Shutov (RUS)	1

Quarterfinals
J. Pantoja Moreno (ESP)	3
Suren Rubenyan (ARM)	2
Aider Abduraimov (UKR)	RSC
Samuel Zupko (SVK)
Kamil Babayev (AZE)	3
U. Smalouski (BLR)	2
Tolga Kaya (TUR)	2
Giorgi Sajaia (GEO)	3

Semifinals
J. Pantoja Moreno (ESP)	0
Aider Abduraimov (UKR)	5
Kamil Babayev (AZE)	1
Giorgi Sajaia (GEO)	4

Final
Aider Abduraimov (UKR)	5
Giorgi Sajaia (GEO)	0

==== Featherweight (57kg) ====
First round
A. Anatolakis (GRE)	Bye
Oskar Sobieszczyk (GER)	0
Yafim Averchanka (BLR)	5
Khaled Badir (ISR)	Bye
Ruslan Tsykalo (UKR)	Bye
Aram Khrikyan (GEO)	Bye
Gökay Yılmaz (TUR)	WO
V. Catalino Vargas (ESP)
G. Khandzhanov (RUS)	5
Taji Taghizada (AZE)	0
Ionuț Chiriac (ROU)	Bye
Tomislav Đinović (MNE)	Bye
Marcel Materla (POL)	4
Darko Đukanović (SRB)	1
Matvejs Prokudins (LAT)	Bye
Manvel Petrosyan (ARM)	Bye
Marcel Ursu (MDA)	Bye
Lorent Murati (KOS)	Bye
Christian Chessa (ITA)	4
Márk Rózsavölgyi (HUN)	0
Daniel Kirilov (BUL)	Bye

Second round
A. Anatolakis (GRE)
Yafim Averchanka (BLR)	WO
Khaled Badir (ISR)	0
Ruslan Tsykalo (UKR)	5
Aram Khrikyan (GEO)	4
Gökay Yılmaz (TUR)	0
G. Khandzhanov (RUS)	5
Ionuț Chiriac (ROU)	0
Tomislav Đinović (MNE)	4
Marcel Materla (POL)	1
Matvejs Prokudins (LAT)	1
Manvel Petrosyan (ARM)	4
Marcel Ursu (MDA)	5
Lorent Murati (KOS)	0
Christian Chessa (ITA)	0
Daniel Kirilov (BUL)	5

Quarterfinals
Yafim Averchanka (BLR)	1
Ruslan Tsykalo (UKR)	4
Aram Khrikyan (GEO)	1
G. Khandzhanov (RUS)	4
Tomislav Đinović (MNE)	2
Manvel Petrosyan (ARM)	3
Marcel Ursu (MDA)	1
Daniel Kirilov (BUL)	4

Semifinals
Ruslan Tsykalo (UKR)	0
G. Khandzhanov (RUS)	5
Manvel Petrosyan (ARM)	5
Daniel Kirilov (BUL)	0

Final
G. Khandzhanov (RUS)	5
Manvel Petrosyan (ARM)	0

==== Lightweight (60kg) ====
First round
Zaur Gahramanov (AZE)	Bye
C. A. Bindar (ITA)	0
S. Flores Luque (ESP)	5
Erik Israyelyan (ARM)	Bye
E. I. Tirzoman (ROU)	Bye
Radoslav Rosenov (BUL)	Bye
Daniil Golodenko (MDA)	1
Danylo Dryzhak (UKR)	4
Doğanay Öztürk (TUR)	0
Saba Tkebuchava (GEO)	5
M. Krachkouski (BLR)	Bye
Omar Lawabna (ISR)	Bye
Maksims Golubovskis (LAT)	0
Paweł Sulęcki (POL)	5
Dimitrios Nikolau (GRE)	0
Elias Idrissi (DEN)	5
Alexey Shendrik (RUS)	Bye
Ivan Ante Gregurić (CRO)	Bye
Enrico Kliesch (GER)	Bye
Ruben Római (HUN)	0
Dmitrii Kataja (FIN)	5
Luka Gačević (MNE)	Bye

Second round
Zaur Gahramanov (AZE)	0
S. Flores Luque (ESP)	5
Erik Israyelyan (ARM)	4
E. I. Tirzoman (ROU)	1
Radoslav Rosenov (BUL)	5
Danylo Dryzhak (UKR)	0
Saba Tkebuchava (GEO)	4
M. Krachkouski (BLR)	1
Omar Lawabna (ISR)	0
Paweł Sulęcki (POL)	5
Elias Idrissi (DEN)	2
Alexey Shendrik (RUS)	3
Ivan Ante Gregurić (CRO)	0
Enrico Kliesch (GER)	5
Dmitrii Kataja (FIN)	0
Luka Gačević (MNE)	5

Quarterfinals
S. Flores Luque (ESP)	1
Erik Israyelyan (ARM)	4
Radoslav Rosenov (BUL)	5
Saba Tkebuchava (GEO)	0
Paweł Sulęcki (POL)	0
Alexey Shendrik (RUS)	5
Enrico Kliesch (GER)	3
Luka Gačević (MNE)	2

Semifinals
Erik Israyelyan (ARM)	1
Radoslav Rosenov (BUL)	3
Alexey Shendrik (RUS)	4
Enrico Kliesch (GER)	0

Final
Radoslav Rosenov (BUL)	3
Alexey Shendrik (RUS)	0

==== Light Welterweight (63.5kg) ====
First round
Jakub Sulęcki (POL)	Bye
Lasha Gagnidze (GEO)	5
Andrii Kostenko (UKR)	0
Magomed Mamaev (RUS)	Bye
H. Hakobkokhyan (ARM)	Bye
Andrei Mustet (ROU)	Bye
Gulu Aliyev (AZE)	Bye
M. Yıldırım Ballıoğlu (TUR)	Bye
Deni Alagić (CRO)	Bye
Matsvei Davydau (BLR)	Bye
E. Kakulov Mamedova (ESP)	2
Samuel Korček (CZE)	3
Krasimir Dzhurov (BUL)	Bye
Simonas Zelenekas (LTU)	Bye
Ș. Vozneacovschi (MDA)	Bye
Benny Tomer (ISR)	Bye
Fatjon Rucaj (ALB)	3
Lihan Ozmen (MKD)	2
Rafael Buza (HUN)	Bye

Second round
Jakub Sulęcki (POL)	0
Lasha Gagnidze (GEO)	5
Magomed Mamaev (RUS)	4
H. Hakobkokhyan (ARM)	0
Andrei Mustet (ROU)	5
Gulu Aliyev (AZE)	0
M. Yıldırım Ballıoğlu (TUR)	2
Deni Alagić (CRO)	3
Matsvei Davydau (BLR)	5
Samuel Korček (CZE)	0
Krasimir Dzhurov (BUL)	5
Simonas Zelenekas (LTU)	0
Ș. Vozneacovschi (MDA)	4
Benny Tomer (ISR)	1
Fatjon Rucaj (ALB)	0
Rafael Buza (HUN)	5

Quarterfinals
Lasha Gagnidze (GEO)	5
Magomed Mamaev (RUS)	0
Andrei Mustet (ROU)	4
Deni Alagić (CRO)	1
Matsvei Davydau (BLR)	3
Krasimir Dzhurov (BUL)	2
Ș. Vozneacovschi (MDA)	5
Rafael Buza (HUN)	0

Semifinals
Lasha Gagnidze (GEO)	5
Andrei Mustet (ROU)	0
Matsvei Davydau (BLR)	4
Ș. Vozneacovschi (MDA)	1

Final
Lasha Gagnidze (GEO)	ABD
Matsvei Davydau (BLR)

==== Welterweight (67kg) ====
First round
Nikita Gorbunovs (LAT)	Bye
Adrian Anghelus (MDA)	0
Luka Nikabadze (GEO)	5
Aleksandr Zyrianov (RUS)	Bye
A. M. Buleu (ROU)	Bye
B. Matyakubov (UKR)	Bye
Kelvin Soquessa (CZE)	0
Bilge Kağan Kanlı (TUR)	5
Leon Buzik (CRO)	3
Rómeó Buza (HUN)	1
Edin Suljić (SRB)	Bye
V. Kruse Hoveling (DEN)	Bye
Dimitrios Meimetis (GRE)	0
Mohammad Issa (ISR)	5
Damjan Liješević (MNE)	Bye
Adolf Staněk (SVK)	Bye
Loris Idrizi (KOS)	Bye
Łukasz Perkowski (POL)	Bye
Narek Zakharyan (ARM)	5
Jemin Allmuça (ALB)	0
F. Martínez Bernad (ESP)	Bye

Second round
Nikita Gorbunovs (LAT)	0
Luka Nikabadze (GEO)	5
Aleksandr Zyrianov (RUS)	5
A. M. Buleu (ROU)	0
B. Matyakubov (UKR)	5
Bilge Kağan Kanlı (TUR)	0
Leon Buzik (CRO)	WO
Edin Suljić (SRB)
V. Kruse Hoveling (DEN)	5
Mohammad Issa (ISR)	0
Damjan Liješević (MNE)	5
Adolf Staněk (SVK)	0
Loris Idrizi (KOS)	3
Łukasz Perkowski (POL)	2
Narek Zakharyan (ARM)
F. Martínez Bernad (ESP)	ABD

Quarterfinals
Luka Nikabadze (GEO)	0
Aleksandr Zyrianov (RUS)	5
B. Matyakubov (UKR)	5
Leon Buzik (CRO)	0
V. Kruse Hoveling (DEN)	0
Damjan Liješević (MNE)	5
Loris Idrizi (KOS)	0
F. Martínez Bernad (ESP)	5

Semifinals
Aleksandr Zyrianov (RUS)	0
B. Matyakubov (UKR)	3
Damjan Liješević (MNE)	0
F. Martínez Bernad (ESP)	5

Final
B. Matyakubov (UKR)	3
F. Martínez Bernad (ESP)	1

==== Light Middleweight (71kg) ====
First round
Cem Kaya (TUR)	Bye
Miljan Cumic (GER)	0
Danii Prokudin (RUS)	5
Daniel Kreko (HUN)	5
Raffaele Piccolo (ITA)	0
C. D. Hermeziu (ROU)	1
Mateusz Urban (POL)	4
K. Balagozyan (ARM)	Bye
Adam Messibah (SUI)	5
Ladislav Horváth (SVK)	0
Nijat Gurhanov (AZE)
Daniil Tsitko (BLR)	KO
Giorgi Zhorzholiani (GEO)	Bye
Alexandra Guranda (MDA)	Bye
Eldar Hodžić (BIH)	0
Makar Vdovitšenko (EST)	5
Ioannis Mpalaouras (GRE)
Udai Suleiman (ISR)	WO
Đorđe Smolović (MNE)	5
Kristián Hodovanec (CZE)	0
Dario Tomić (SRB)	5
Ajhan Ozmen (MKD)	0
Leotrim Muli (KOS)	0
Sam Morovati (FIN)	5
P. K. Knežević (CRO)	0
Arnas Kazakevičius (LTU)	5
V. Bryhadenko (UKR)	Bye

Second round
Cem Kaya (TUR)	0
Danii Prokudin (RUS)	5
Daniel Kreko (HUN)	0
Mateusz Urban (POL)	5
K. Balagozyan (ARM)	0
Adam Messibah (SUI)	5
Daniil Tsitko (BLR)	1
Giorgi Zhorzholiani (GEO)	4
Alexandra Guranda (MDA)
Makar Vdovitšenko (EST)	RSC
Udai Suleiman (ISR)	1
Đorđe Smolović (MNE)	4
Dario Tomić (SRB)
Sam Morovati (FIN)	RSC
Arnas Kazakevičius (LTU)	2
V. Bryhadenko (UKR)	3

Quarterfinals
Danii Prokudin (RUS)	5
Mateusz Urban (POL)	0
Adam Messibah (SUI)	1
Giorgi Zhorzholiani (GEO)	3
Makar Vdovitšenko (EST)	0
Đorđe Smolović (MNE)	5
Sam Morovati (FIN)	1
V. Bryhadenko (UKR)	4

Semifinals
Danii Prokudin (RUS)	5
Giorgi Zhorzholiani (GEO)	0
Đorđe Smolović (MNE)	5
V. Bryhadenko (UKR)	0

Final
Danii Prokudin (RUS)	5
Đorđe Smolović (MNE)	0

==== Middleweight (75kg) ====
First round
Rastko Simić (SRB)	Bye
U. Starastsenka (BLR)	5
Lorenzo Frugoli (ITA)	0
Andrei Redca (MDA)	Bye
Noa Hadjit (BEL)	Bye
Surik Hambaryan (ARM)	Bye
Irakli Janelidze (GEO)	0
Antonio Grabić (CRO)	5
N. Antonopoulos (GRE)	1
Jindřich Janečka (CZE)	4
William Cholov (BUL)	Bye
Matti Haubler (GER)	Bye
Oleksandr Balabin (UKR)	5
David Bazov (ISR)	0
G. I. Dumitrescu (ROU)	5
Marko Simon (HUN)	0
Tunahan Tüysüz (TUR)	Bye
Igor Antonov (EST)	Bye
Halio Gakić (BIH)	Bye
Dejan Leburić (SLO)	1
Arvydas Dainys (LTU)	4
Akim Pavliukov (RUS)	Bye

Second round
Rastko Simić (SRB)	5
U. Starastsenka (BLR)	0
Andrei Redca (MDA)
Noa Hadjit (BEL)	RSC
Surik Hambaryan (ARM)	0
Antonio Grabić (CRO)	5
Jindřich Janečka (CZE)	0
William Cholov (BUL)	5
Matti Haubler (GER)	0
Oleksandr Balabin (UKR)	5
G. I. Dumitrescu (ROU)	5
Tunahan Tüysüz (TUR)	0
Igor Antonov (EST)	4
Halio Gakić (BIH)	1
Arvydas Dainys (LTU)	0
Akim Pavliukov (RUS)	5

Quarterfinals
Rastko Simić (SRB)	5
Noa Hadjit (BEL)	0
Antonio Grabić (CRO)
William Cholov (BUL)	KO
Oleksandr Balabin (UKR)	4
G. I. Dumitrescu (ROU)	0
Igor Antonov (EST)
Akim Pavliukov (RUS)	RSC

Semifinals
Rastko Simić (SRB)	2
William Cholov (BUL)	3
Oleksandr Balabin (UKR)
Akim Pavliukov (RUS)	WO

Final
William Cholov (BUL)	4
Akim Pavliukov (RUS)	1

==== Light Heavyweight (80kg) ====
First round
Georgi Stoyanov (BUL)	Bye
Daniel Komárek (CZE)	2
Anton Vinogradov (EST)	3
Aleksandr Grunichev (RUS)	5
Giorgi Dekanozishvili (GEO)	0
Bedirhan Kalkan (TUR)	4
Sebastian Kusz (POL)	1
Matvii Razhba (UKR)	5
Artūrs Tarnopoļskis (LAT)	0
Redis Karaj (ALB)	0
Samuele Giuliano (ITA)	5
Marko Mijović (MNE)	0
Corrie van de Pavert (NED)	5
Michail Tsamalidis (GRE)	5
Ahmed Mavrić (SRB)	0

Quarterfinals
Georgi Stoyanov (BUL)	0
Anton Vinogradov (EST)	5
Aleksandr Grunichev (RUS)	5
Bedirhan Kalkan (TUR)	0
Matvii Razhba (UKR)	5
Samuele Giuliano (ITA)	0
Corrie van de Pavert (NED)	WO
Michail Tsamalidis (GRE)

Semifinals
Anton Vinogradov (EST)
Aleksandr Grunichev (RUS)	RSC
Matvii Razhba (UKR)	RSC
Corrie van de Pavert (NED)

Final
Aleksandr Grunichev (RUS)	3
Matvii Razhba (UKR)	2

==== Cruiserweight (86g) ====
First round
Fatali Ismayilov (AZE)	Bye
Narūnas Grebnevas (LTU)	RSC
Victor Scutelniciuc (MDA)
Taulant Jakupi (KOS)	2
Kevin Beri (HUN)	3
David Polák (CZE)	5
Georgi Stoev (BUL)	0
Atalay Şenova (TUR)
Andrei Masalau (BLR)	RSC
Egor Plotsyn (RUS)	5
Mykyta Gorbatenko (UKR)	0
Dawid Tkacz (POL)	0
Paolo Caruso (ITA)	5
Henrik Tshghrikyan (ARM)	Bye

Quarterfinals
Fatali Ismayilov (AZE)	1
Narūnas Grebnevas (LTU)	4
Kevin Beri (HUN)	0
David Polák (CZE)	4
Andrei Masalau (BLR)	3
Egor Plotsyn (RUS)	2
Paolo Caruso (ITA)	0
Henrik Tshghrikyan (ARM)	5

Semifinals
Narūnas Grebnevas (LTU)	0
David Polák (CZE)	5
Andrei Masalau (BLR)	2
Henrik Tshghrikyan (ARM)	3

Final
David Polák (CZE)	0
Henrik Tshghrikyan (ARM)	5

==== Heavyweight (92kg) ====
First round
Mikita Nahorny (BLR)	Bye
Anushavan Mkhitaryan (ARM)	0
Volodymyr Kulikovskyi (UKR)	5
Rashid Mammadov (AZE)	Bye
Manuchar Kriheli (ISR)	Bye
Đorđe Lainović (MNE)	Bye
Isidoros Kefalinos (GRE)	5
Béla Szabados (HUN)	0
Jakub Straszewski (POL)	5
Göktürk Ersungur (TUR)	0
Said Almazov (RUS)	Bye

Quarterfinals
Mikita Nahorny (BLR)	5
Volodymyr Kulikovskyi (UKR)	0
Rashid Mammadov (AZE)	0
Manuchar Kriheli (ISR)	5
Đorđe Lainović (MNE)	WO
Isidoros Kefalinos (GRE)
Jakub Straszewski (POL)	0
Said Almazov (RUS)	5

Semifinals
Mikita Nahorny (BLR)	0
Manuchar Kriheli (ISR)	5
Đorđe Lainović (MNE)
Said Almazov (RUS)	ABD

Final
Manuchar Kriheli (ISR)
Said Almazov (RUS)	RSC

==== Super Heavyweight (+92kg) ====
First round
Gökhan Karamehmet (TUR)	Bye
Dmytro Babliuk (UKR)	3
Ardijan Azemi (MKD)	2
Alija Mešić (BIH)	3
Filip Kočí (CZE)	2
Kiril Borisov (BUL)	Bye
Sergei Manzhuev (RUS)	Bye
Hovhannes Papazyan (ARM)	1
Nikita Putilov (GER)	4
Bence Bogdalik (HUN)	5
Nojus Ivanauskas (LTU)	0
Nicolai Burdiuja (MDA)	Bye

Quarterfinals
Gökhan Karamehmet (TUR)	1
Dmytro Babliuk (UKR)	4
Alija Mešić (BIH)
Kiril Borisov (BUL)	WO
Sergei Manzhuev (RUS)	0
Nikita Putilov (GER)	5
Bence Bogdalik (HUN)	0
Nicolai Burdiuja (MDA)	5

Semifinals
Dmytro Babliuk (UKR)	5
Kiril Borisov (BUL)	0
Nikita Putilov (GER)	ABD
Nicolai Burdiuja (MDA)

Final
Dmytro Babliuk (UKR)
Nikita Putilov (GER)	ABD

=== Women's ===
==== Minimumweight (48kg) ====
First round
Laura Barceló Calderón (ESP)	Bye
Darya Dzeranok (BLR)	3
Emilia Ramona Drăgan (ROU)	2
Yelizaveta Voievudko (UKR)	Bye
Petra Mezei (HUN)	Bye
Anna Kostina (RUS)	Bye
Jessica Erbasecca (ITA)	Bye
Natalia Kuczewska (POL)	Bye
Nurselen Yalgattekin (TUR)	Bye

Quarterfinals
Laura Barceló Calderón (ESP)	5
Darya Dzeranok (BLR)	0
Yelizaveta Voievudko (UKR)	0
Petra Mezei (HUN)	5
Anna Kostina (RUS)	5
Jessica Erbasecca (ITA)	0
Natalia Kuczewska (POL)	2
Nurselen Yalgattekin (TUR)	3

Semifinals
Laura Barceló Calderón (ESP)	1
Petra Mezei (HUN)	3
Anna Kostina (RUS)	4
Nurselen Yalgattekin (TUR)	1

Final
Petra Mezei (HUN)	0
Anna Kostina (RUS)	5

==== Light Flyweight (50kg) ====
First round
Sophia Mazzoni (ITA)	Bye
Julia Wasiakowska (POL)	4
Pia Järvinen (FIN)	1
Arina Vostrikova (RUS)	5
Polina Palmanova (UKR)	0
Nilay Yaren Çam (TUR)	4
Eleni Cholidi (GRE)	1
Sofie Vinther Rosshaug (DEN)	RSC
Iratxe Vals del Valle (ESP)
Jessica Vollmann (GER)	5
Kata Pap (HUN)	0
Jenny Simonsen (NOR)	5
Roxana Hamza (ROU)	0
Sara Čirković (SRB)	Bye

Quarterfinals
Sophia Mazzoni (ITA)	RSC
Julia Wasiakowska (POL)
Arina Vostrikova (RUS)	4
Nilay Yaren Çam (TUR)	1
Sofie Vinther Rosshaug (DEN)	5
Jessica Vollmann (GER)	0
Jenny Simonsen (NOR)	0
Sara Čirković (SRB)	5

Semifinals
Sophia Mazzoni (ITA)	5
Arina Vostrikova (RUS)	0
Sofie Vinther Rosshaug (DEN)	2
Sara Čirković (SRB)	3

Final
Sophia Mazzoni (ITA)	5
Sara Čirković (SRB)	0

==== Flyweight (52kg) ====
Quarterfinals
Laura Kovács (HUN)	0
Gamze Soğuksu (TUR)	5
Aurora De Persio (ITA)	0
Nikola Prymaczenko (POL)	5
Valeriia Linkova (RUS)	RSC
L. M. de Mairena Aragón (ESP)
Arevik Dokholyan (ARM)	0
Daria-Olha Hutarina (UKR)	5

Semifinals
Gamze Soğuksu (TUR)	5
Nikola Prymaczenko (POL)	0
Valeriia Linkova (RUS)	4
Daria-Olha Hutarina (UKR)	1

Final
Gamze Soğuksu (TUR)	2
Valeriia Linkova (RUS)	3

==== Bantamweight (54kg) ====
First round
Irina Vinahradava (BLR)	Bye
Claudia Tótová (CZE)	0
Iryna Melnyk (UKR)	5
Kevser Tütüncü (TUR)	Bye
Nicoleta Marilena Banciu (ROU)	Bye
Anastasiia Kirienko (RUS)	Bye
Julia Szeremeta (POL)	5
Nerea Martínez Arroyo (ESP)	0
Barbara Megyeri (HUN)	2
Michela Caccamo (ITA)	3
A. F. Giannakopoulou (GRE)	Bye

Quarterfinals
Irina Vinahradava (BLR)	2
Iryna Melnyk (UKR)	3
Kevser Tütüncü (TUR)	RSC
Nicoleta Marilena Banciu (ROU)
Anastasiia Kirienko (RUS)	5
Julia Szeremeta (POL)	0
Michela Caccamo (ITA)	0
A. F. Giannakopoulou (GRE)	5

Semifinals
Iryna Melnyk (UKR)	2
Kevser Tütüncü (TUR)	3
Anastasiia Kirienko (RUS)	2
A. F. Giannakopoulou (GRE)	3

Final
Kevser Tütüncü (TUR)	0
A. F. Giannakopoulou (GRE)	5

==== Featherweight (57kg) ====
First round
Giorgia Paradisi (ITA)	Bye
Sila Sürmeneli (TUR)	1
Kateryna Bodnarchuk (UKR)	4
Alina Pushkar (RUS)	Bye
Josefien Betist (NED)	Bye
Bojana Gojković (MNE)	Bye
Beáta Varga (HUN)	1
Nayara Arroyo Rodríguez (ESP)	4
Kristina Marković (SRB)
Zehra Milli (SWE)	RSC
Teresa Mäkinen (FIN)	Bye

Quarterfinals
Giorgia Paradisi (ITA)	0
Kateryna Bodnarchuk (UKR)	5
Alina Pushkar (RUS)	5
Josefien Betist (NED)	0
Bojana Gojković (MNE)	5
Nayara Arroyo Rodríguez (ESP)	0
Zehra Milli (SWE)	3
Teresa Mäkinen (FIN)	1

Semifinals
Kateryna Bodnarchuk (UKR)	0
Alina Pushkar (RUS)	5
Bojana Gojković (MNE)	5
Zehra Milli (SWE)	0

Final
Alina Pushkar (RUS)	0
Bojana Gojković (MNE)	5

==== Lightweight (60kg) ====
First round
Berfin Polat (TUR)	Bye
Darya Letsko (BLR)	0
Loreadana-Andreea Marin (ROU)	5
Julianna Rutkowska (POL)	0
Veronika Gajdová (CZE)	5
Nadezhda Golubeva (RUS)	5
Iliana Hadjivasiliou (CYP)	0
Kristina Yushchuk (UKR)	5
Rebeka Dobos (HUN)	0
Elida Kocharyan (ARM)	WO
Vanuhi Manasyan (GEO)
Cristina Chiper (MDA)	4
Sipel Duna (SWE)	1
Suvi Tujula (FIN)	0
Carlotta Abbate (ITA)	5

Quarterfinals
Berfin Polat (TUR)
Loreadana-Andreea Marin (ROU)	RSC
Veronika Gajdová (CZE)	0
Nadezhda Golubeva (RUS)	5
Kristina Yushchuk (UKR)
Elida Kocharyan (ARM)	RSC
Cristina Chiper (MDA)	3
Carlotta Abbate (ITA)	2

Semifinals
Loreadana-Andreea Marin (ROU)	0
Nadezhda Golubeva (RUS)	5
Elida Kocharyan (ARM)	RSC
Cristina Chiper (MDA)

Final
Nadezhda Golubeva (RUS)	5
Elida Kocharyan (ARM)	0

==== Light Welterweight (63kg) ====
First round
Ulada Bazylevich (BLR)	Bye
Ece Asude Deniz (TUR)	RSC
Dagmara Kaliszan (POL)
Alina Siedova (UKR)	0
Luna Beeloo (NED)	4
Jenin Heck (GER)	Bye
Iulia Starchenko (RUS)	Bye
Tara Bohatjuk (BIH)
Sona Harutyunyan (ARM)	RSC
Anastasija Nikolovski (SRB)	0
Lucin Seropian (SWE)	5
Saulė Kardokaitė (LTU)	Bye

Quarterfinals
Ulada Bazylevich (BLR)
Ece Asude Deniz (TUR)	RSC
Luna Beeloo (NED)	2
Jenin Heck (GER)	3
Iulia Starchenko (RUS)	RSC
Sona Harutyunyan (ARM)
Lucin Seropian (SWE)	RSC
Saulė Kardokaitė (LTU)

Semifinals
Ece Asude Deniz (TUR)	2
Jenin Heck (GER)	3
Iulia Starchenko (RUS)	5
Lucin Seropian (SWE)	0

Final
Jenin Heck (GER)	0
Iulia Starchenko (RUS)	5

==== Welterweight (66kg) ====
First round
Oliwia Stolarczyk (POL)	Bye
Damiana Trischittak (ITA)	0
Ayşe Doğan (TUR)	5
Anna Sezko (UKR)	Bye
Alina Alexandra Creţu (ROU)	Bye
Azalia Amineva (RUS)	Bye
Franciska Varga (HUN)	Bye
Aleksandra Tepavac (SRB)	Bye
Lütfiye Tutal (GER)	Bye

Quarterfinals
Oliwia Stolarczyk (POL)	1
Ayşe Doğan (TUR)	4
Anna Sezko (UKR)	5
Alina Alexandra Creţu (ROU)	0
Azalia Amineva (RUS)	ABD
Franciska Varga (HUN)
Aleksandra Tepavac (SRB)
Lütfiye Tutal (GER)	RSC

Semifinals
Ayşe Doğan (TUR)	0
Anna Sezko (UKR)	5
Azalia Amineva (RUS)	RSC
Lütfiye Tutal (GER)

Final
Anna Sezko (UKR)	0
Azalia Amineva (RUS)	5

==== Light Middleweight (70kg) ====
Quarterfinals
Veronika Nakota (UKR)	Bye
İlayda Sıla Yurttutan (TUR)	1
Lia Pukkila (ISR)	4
Carlotta Schünemann (GER)	0
Barbara Marcinkowska (POL)	5
Anastasiia Demurchian (RUS)	Bye

Semifinals
Veronika Nakota (UKR)	5
Lia Pukkila (ISR)	0
Barbara Marcinkowska (POL)	0
Anastasiia Demurchian (RUS)	5

Final
Veronika Nakota (UKR)	4
Anastasiia Demurchian (RUS)	0

==== Middleweight (75kg) ====
First round
Valeria Kats Savchuk (ISR)	Bye
Daria Bazhenova (RUS)	5
Karine Airapetian (UKR)	0
Sunniva Hofstad (NOR)	Bye
Oliwia Czerwińska (POL)	Bye
Boglárka Varga (HUN)	Bye
Vasiliki Stavridou (GRE)	Bye
Chiara Saraiello (ITA)	Bye
Roberta Andrei (ROU)	Bye

Quarterfinals
Valeria Kats Savchuk (ISR)
Daria Bazhenova (RUS)	RSC
Sunniva Hofstad (NOR)	RSC
Oliwia Czerwińska (POL)
Boglárka Varga (HUN)
Vasiliki Stavridou (GRE)	RSC
Chiara Saraiello (ITA)	RSC
Roberta Andrei (ROU)

Semifinals
Daria Bazhenova (RUS)	0
Sunniva Hofstad (NOR)	5
Vasiliki Stavridou (GRE)	5
Chiara Saraiello (ITA)	0

Final
Sunniva Hofstad (NOR)	RSC
Vasiliki Stavridou (GRE)

==== Light Heavyweight (81kg) ====
Quarterfinals
Maria Proskunova (RUS)	Bye
Maria Pępek (POL)
Maria Livia Botică (ROU)	RSC
Senanur Kocaoğlu (TUR)	Bye
Raisa Piskun (UKR)	Bye

Semifinals
Maria Proskunova (RUS)	RSC
Maria Livia Botică (ROU)
Senanur Kocaoğlu (TUR)
Raisa Piskun (UKR)	RSC

Final
Maria Proskunova (RUS)	5
Raisa Piskun (UKR)	0

==== Heavyweight (+81kg) ====
Semifinals
Kamilė Aglinskaitė (LTU)
Tatiana Bogdanova (RUS)	RSC
Weronika Bochen (POL)	RSC
Nina Karpenko (UKR)

Final
Tatiana Bogdanova (RUS)	5
Weronika Bochen (POL)	0
