= 2022 Youth European Boxing Championships =

Boxing Championships

- Venue: Sofia Sports Hall
- Location: Sofia, Bulgaria
- Dates: 14–21 April 2022
- Competitors: 377 from 40 nations

The 2022 Youth European Boxing Championships, the 32nd European Boxing Championships for youths aged 17 to 19, took place in Sofia, Bulgaria, from 14 to 21 April 2022. The event was organized by the European Boxing Confederation (EUBC). To participate, boxers must have been born in 2003 too 2005.

== Medals ==
=== Men's ===
* Host nation (Bulgaria)

| Rank | Nation | Gold | Silver | Bronze | Total |
|---|---|---|---|---|---|
| 1 | England | 3 | 1 | 1 | 5 |
| 2 | Ukraine | 3 | 0 | 2 | 5 |
| 3 | Georgia | 2 | 0 | 2 | 4 |
| 4 | Bulgaria* | 1 | 3 | 0 | 4 |
| 5 | Armenia | 1 | 2 | 0 | 3 |
| 6 | Azerbaijan | 1 | 0 | 1 | 2 |
| 6 | Greece | 1 | 0 | 1 | 2 |
| 6 | Ireland | 1 | 0 | 1 | 2 |
| 9 | Italy | 0 | 2 | 1 | 3 |
| 10 | Moldova | 0 | 1 | 2 | 3 |
| 11 | Romania | 0 | 1 | 1 | 2 |
| 11 | Serbia | 0 | 1 | 1 | 2 |
| 13 | Albania | 0 | 1 | 0 | 1 |
| 13 | Germany | 0 | 1 | 0 | 1 |
| 13 | Poland | 0 | 1 | 0 | 1 |
| 16 | Turkey | 0 | 0 | 3 | 3 |
| 17 | France | 0 | 0 | 2 | 2 |
| 17 | Kosovo | 0 | 0 | 2 | 2 |
| 17 | Spain | 0 | 0 | 2 | 2 |
| 20 | Latvia | 0 | 0 | 1 | 1 |
| 20 | Montenegro | 0 | 0 | 1 | 1 |
| 20 | North Macedonia | 0 | 0 | 1 | 1 |
| 20 | Sweden | 0 | 0 | 1 | 1 |
| Totals (23 entries) | | 13 | 14 | 26 | 53 |

=== Women's ===
* Host nation (Bulgaria)

| Rank | Nation | Gold | Silver | Bronze | Total |
|---|---|---|---|---|---|
| 1 | Ukraine | 2 | 2 | 1 | 5 |
| 2 | Ireland | 2 | 1 | 3 | 6 |
| 3 | Germany | 1 | 2 | 0 | 3 |
| 4 | England | 1 | 1 | 1 | 3 |
| 5 | Turkey | 1 | 0 | 2 | 3 |
| 6 | France | 1 | 0 | 1 | 2 |
| 6 | Italy | 1 | 0 | 1 | 2 |
| 6 | Norway | 1 | 0 | 1 | 2 |
| 6 | Serbia | 1 | 0 | 1 | 2 |
| 10 | Romania | 1 | 0 | 0 | 1 |
| 11 | Poland | 0 | 1 | 4 | 5 |
| 12 | Spain | 0 | 1 | 2 | 3 |
| 13 | Georgia | 0 | 1 | 1 | 2 |
| 13 | Latvia | 0 | 1 | 1 | 2 |
| 13 | Slovakia | 0 | 1 | 1 | 2 |
| 16 | Finland | 0 | 1 | 0 | 1 |
| 17 | Bulgaria* | 0 | 0 | 1 | 1 |
| 17 | Estonia | 0 | 0 | 1 | 1 |
| 17 | Hungary | 0 | 0 | 1 | 1 |
| 17 | Lithuania | 0 | 0 | 1 | 1 |
| Totals (20 entries) | | 12 | 12 | 24 | 48 |

== Medalists ==
| Event | Gold | Silver | Bronze |
Men
| Minimumweight (M48 kg) | Kanan Babayev (AZE) | Nikolas Pawlik (POL) | Asier Jiménez (ESP); Patsy Joyce (IRL) |
| Flyweight (M51 kg) | Gor Ayvazyan (GEO) | Arjol Zeneli (ALB) | Ilie Argatu (MDA); Amin Mammadzada (AZE) |
| Bantamweight (M54 kg) | Owen Ketley (ENG) | Lyuboslav Metodiev (BUL) | Petar Arsovski (MKD); Ahmet Pekel (TUR) |
| Featherweight (M57 kg) | Aider Abduraimov (UKR) | Arian Gohar (GER) | Salvatore Di Stefano (ITA); Marwan Mouflih (FRA) |
| Lightweight (M60 kg) | Erik Israyelyan (ARM) | Toni Iliev (BUL) | Stefanos Oikonomou (GRE); Gocha Gordulava (GEO) |
| Light Welterweight (M63.5 kg) | Demur Kajaia (GEO) | Ianus Caravan (MDA) | Renats Šarovs (LAT); Osama Mohamed (ENG) |
| Welterweight (M67 kg) | Oleksii Boklakh (UKR) | Ares Hakobyan (ARM) | Ganda Coulibaly (ESP); Kagan Kanlı (TUR) |
| Light Middleweight (M71 kg) | Duggan Flood (IRL) | Gabriele Guidi (ITA) | Doruleţ Țiu (ROU); Mirko Šarčević (MNE) |
| Middleweight (M75 kg) | Oleksandr Balabin (UKR) | luca Perkins (ENG) | Saba Kvinikadze (GEO); Yojerlin Cesar (FRA) |
| Light Heavyweight (M80 kg) | Michail Tsamalidis (GRE) | Hamlet Adamyan (ARM) | Marko Pižurica (SRB); Muhammed Doğru (TUR) |
| Cruiserweight (M86 kg) | Georgi Stoyanov (BUL) | Paolo Caruso (ITA) | Oğuzhan Türk (TUR); Taulant Jakupi (KOS) |
| Heavyweight (M92 kg) | Damar Thomas (ENG) | Florin Ioniță (ROU) | Donat Syla (KOS); Elwin Mayue-Belezika (SWE) |
| Super Heavyweight (M+92 kg) | Moses Itauma (ENG) | Kiril Borisov (BUL) | Nicolai Burdiuja (MDA); Oleksandr Zelenskyi (UKR) |
Women
| Minimumweight (W48 kg) | Filiz Işık (TUR) | Laura Barceló (ESP) | Tamar Samelia (GEO); Catherine Dunn (IRL) |
| Light Flyweight (W50 kg) | Sara Čirković (SRB) | Jessica Vollmann (GER) | Iratxe Vals del Valle (ESP); Katie O'Keeffe (IRL) |
| Flyweight (W52 kg) | Kaëlya Mopin (FRA) | Lauren Mackie (ENG) | Dragana Jovanović (SRB); Luna Mairena (ESP) |
| Bantamweight (W54 kg) | Emily Whitworth (ENG) | Bibiana Lovašová (SVK) | Kevser Tütüncü (TUR); Maria Sannino (ITA) |
| Featherweight (W57 kg) | Asya Ari (GER) | Laura Jakovļeva (LAT) | Rumyana Aleksandrova (BUL); Sıla Sürmeneli (TUR) |
| Lightweight (W60 kg) | Tetiana Dovhal (UKR) | Yessica Frantsi (FIN) | Aleksandra Cyrek (POL); Tamara Kubalová (SVK) |
| Light Welterweight (W63 kg) | Valentina Marra (ITA) | Lütfiye Tutal (GER) | Winnie McDonagh (IRL); Julianna Rutkowska (POL) |
| Welterweight (W66 kg) | Crinuta Sebe (ROU) | Aleksandra Jankowiak (POL) | Maëlys Richol (FRA); Kitija Zārberga (LAT) |
| Light Middleweight (W70 kg) | Veronika Nakota (UKR) | Laura Moran (IRL) | Nikolett Kovács (HUN); Oliwia Czerwińska (POL) |
| Middleweight (W75 kg) | Sunniva Hofstad (NOR) | Tatia Bukia (GEO) | Amber Moss-Birch (ENG); Yelyzaveta Zhyboiedova (UKR) |
| Light Heavyweight (W81 kg) | Dearbhla Tinnelly (IRL) | Karine Airapetian (UKR) | Aleksandra Meliss (EST); Sofia Sørensen (NOR) |
| Heavyweight (W+81 kg) | Cliona D'Arcy (IRL) | Polina Chernenko (UKR) | Weronika Bochen (POL); Kamilė Aglinskaitė (LTU) |

== Schedule ==
Preliminary rounds
Quarterfinals
Semifinals
Final

| Weight category | 14 Apr | 15 Apr | 16 Apr | 17 Apr | 18 Apr | 19 Apr | 20 Apr | 21 Apr | Total |
Men
| Minimumweight (M48 kg) | | 6 | | | | 4 | 2 | 1 | 13 |
| Flyweight (M51 kg) | | 1 | 8 | | | 4 | 2 | 1 | 16 |
| Bantamweight (M54 kg) | 5 | | 8 | | | 4 | 2 | 1 | 20 |
| Featherweight (M57 kg) | | | 4 | 8 | | 4 | 2 | 1 | 19 |
| Lightweight (M60 kg) | | 8 | | 8 | | 4 | 2 | 1 | 23 |
| Light Welterweight (M63.5 kg) | | 8 | | 8 | | 4 | 2 | 1 | 23 |
| Welterweight (M67 kg) | 8 | | 8 | | | 4 | 2 | 1 | 23 |
| Light Middleweight (M71 kg) | 12 | | | 8 | | 4 | 2 | 1 | 27 |
| Middleweight (M75 kg) | 7 | 8 | | | | 4 | 2 | 1 | 22 |
| Light Heavyweight (M80 kg) | | | 8 | | | 4 | 2 | 1 | 15 |
| Cruiserweight (M86 kg) | | 3 | | | 4 | | 2 | 1 | 10 |
| Heavyweight (M92 kg) | | | 4 | | 4 | | 2 | 1 | 11 |
| Super Heavyweight (M+92 kg) | | 6 | | | 4 | | 2 | 1 | 13 |
Women
| Minimumweight (W48 kg) | | | 5 | | 4 | | 2 | 1 | 12 |
| Light Flyweight (W50 kg) | | 3 | | | 4 | | 2 | 1 | 10 |
| Flyweight (W52 kg) | 7 | | | | 4 | | 2 | 1 | 14 |
| Bantamweight (W54 kg) | | | 5 | | 4 | | 2 | 1 | 12 |
| Featherweight (W57 kg) | | | | 4 | 4 | | 2 | 1 | 11 |
| Lightweight (W60 kg) | 2 | | | | 4 | | 2 | 1 | 9 |
| Light Welterweight (W63 kg) | 1 | | | | | 4 | 2 | 1 | 8 |
| Welterweight (W66 kg) | | 3 | | | | 4 | 2 | 1 | 10 |
| Light Middleweight (W70 kg) | | | | 2 | 4 | | 2 | 1 | 9 |
| Middleweight (W75 kg) | 1 | | | | 4 | | 2 | 1 | 8 |
| Light Heavyweight (W81 kg) | 3 | | | | | | 2 | 1 | 6 |
| Heavyweight (W+81 kg) | 1 | | | | 4 | | 2 | 1 | 8 |
| Total | 47 | 46 | 50 | 38 | 48 | 48 | 50 | 25 | 352 |

== Participating countries ==
A total of 377 boxers from the national teams of the following 40 countries was registered to compete at 2022 Youth European Boxing Championships.

Russia and Belarus banned from attending all international competitions due to the 2022 Russian invasion of Ukraine.

1. Albania (1)
2. Armenia (13)
3. Azerbaijan (13)
4. Belgium (2)
5. Bosnia and Herzegovina (6)
6. Bulgaria (18)
7. Croatia (5)
8. Czech Republic (9)
9. Denmark (4)
10. England (16)
11. Estonia (5)
12. Finland (6)
13. France (6)
14. Georgia (13)
15. Germany (20)
16. Greece (8)
17. Hungary (17)
18. Ireland (24)
19. Israel (7)
20. Italy (16)
21. Kosovo (4)
22. Latvia (7)
23. Lithuania (5)
24. Moldova (13)
25. Montenegro (3)
26. Netherlands (1)
27. North Macedonia (2)
28. Norway (5)
29. Poland (18)
30. Romania (19)
31. Scotland (3)
32. Serbia (9)
33. Slovakia (6)
34. Slovenia (2)
35. Spain (10)
36. Sweden (7)
37. Switzerland (2)
38. Turkey (25)
39. Ukraine (25)
40. Wales (2)

== Draw sheets ==
=== Men's Minimumweight (M48 kg) ===
First round
N Pawlik (POL) | 5
S El Okby (ISR) | 0
M Rozlovan (MDA) | 1
C Zsigó (HUN) | 4
O Akhmedov (GEO) | 5
S Maccioni (ITA) | 0
K Babayev (AZE) | 4
T Yağlı (TUR) | 0
M Tallon (ENG) | 2
V Kondratiuk (UKR) | 3
T Tovmasyan (ARM) | 0
P Joyce (IRL) | 5

Quarterfinals
A Jiménez (ESP) | 5
Y Stefanov (BUL) | 0
N Pawlik (POL) | 5
C Zsigó (HUN) | 0
O Akhmedov (GEO) | 0
K Babayev (AZE) | 5
V Kondratiuk (UKR) | 0
P Joyce (IRL) | 5

Semifinals
A Jiménez (ESP) | 1
N Pawlik (POL) | 4
K Babayev (AZE) | 5
P Joyce (IRL) | 0

Final
N Pawlik (POL) | 0
K Babayev (AZE) | 5

=== Men's Flyweight (M51 kg) ===
First round
S Cınıbulak (TUR) | 1
J Cory (WAL) | 4

Second round
L Vymyslický (SVK) | 5
H Shehabi (MKD) | 0
R Lozano (ESP) | 0
A Zeneli (ALB) | 5
S Gryholt (DEN) | 0
V-C Schiopu (ROU) | 5
R Tokar (CZE)
T Argatu (MDA) | RSC
G Ayvazyan (GEO) | RSC
I Dümpelfeld (GER)
A Camiolo (ITA) | 0
M Rudyk (UKR) | 5
A McKenna (IRL) | 0
A Mammadzada (AZE) | 5
A Aslamazyan (ARM) | 4
J Cory (WAL) | 1

Quarterfinals
L Vymyslický (SVK) | 0
A Zeneli (ALB) | 5
V-C Schiopu (ROU) | 0
T Argatu (MDA) | 5
G Ayvazyan (GEO) | 4
M Rudyk (UKR) | 1
A Mammadzada (AZE) | 5
A Aslamazyan (ARM) | 0

Semifinals
A Zeneli (ALB) | 5
T Argatu (MDA) | 0
G Ayvazyan (GEO) | 5
A Mammadzada (AZE) | 0

Final
A Zeneli (ALB) | 1
G Ayvazyan (GEO) | 4

=== Men's Bantamweight (M54 kg) ===
First round
I Dehesa (ESP)
A Pekel (TUR) | RSC
A Cullen (SCO) | 1
D Rozdolskyi (UKR) | 4
K Babayev (AZE) | 2
D Japaridze (GEO) | 3
O Ketley (ENG) | 5
R Shane (IRL) | 0
D Bril (GER) | 5
G Azizyan (ARM) | 0

Second round
N Szafarz (POL) | 5
F Božović (MNE) | 0
J Slepčík (CZE) | 0
L Metodiev (BUL) | 5
M Janíček (SVK) | 2
P Arsovski (MKD) | 3
A Velis (GRE) | 5
R Kleins (LAT) | 0
I-M Pavel (ROU) | 5
S Kiss (HUN) | 0
S Novac (MDA) | 1
A Pekel (TUR) | 4
D Rozdolskyi (UKR) | 5
D Japaridze (GEO) | 0
O Ketley (ENG) | 4
D Bril (GER) | 0

Quarterfinals
N Szafarz (POL) | 0
L Metodiev (BUL) | 5
P Arsovski (MKD) | 5
A Velis (GRE) | 0
I-M Pavel (ROU) | 0
A Pekel (TUR) | 5
D Rozdolskyi (UKR) | 1
O Ketley (ENG) | 4

Semifinals
L Metodiev (BUL) | 5
P Arsovski (MKD) | 0
A Pekel (TUR) | 0
O Ketley (ENG) | 5

Final
L Metodiev (BUL) | 0
O Ketley (ENG) | 5

=== Men's Featherweight (M57 kg) ===
First round
A Bayramov (AZE) | 0
J Donoghue (IRL) | 5
F Wood (ENG) | 3
M Petrosyan (ARM) | 2
D Toniev (BUL) | 0
B Civelek (TUR) | 4
M Mouflih (FRA) | 5
S Eremeishvili (GEO) | 0

Second round
D Đukanović (SRB) | 0
A Abduraimov (UKR) | 5
A Abd El Jawad (ISR) | 5
K Pawlik (POL) | 0
S Di Stefano (ITA) | 5
M Litchevici (MDA) | 0
H Härstedt (SWE) | 0
D Énekes (HUN) | 5
I Chiriac (ROU) | 5
M Petersen (DEN) | 0
A Gohar (GER) | 5
E Chakour El Gorrou (ESP) | 0
J Donoghue (IRL) | 5
F Wood (ENG) | 0
B Civelek (TUR) | 2
M Mouflih (FRA) | 3

Quarterfinals
A Abduraimov (UKR) | 5
A Abd El Jawad (ISR) | 0
S Di Stefano (ITA) | 4
D Énekes (HUN) | 1
I Chiriac (ROU) | 1
A Gohar (GER) | 4
J Donoghue (IRL) | 1
M Mouflih (FRA) | 4

Semifinals
A Abduraimov (UKR) | 3
S Di Stefano (ITA) | 2
A Gohar (GER) | 3
M Mouflih (FRA) | 2

Final
A Abduraimov (UKR) | 5
A Gohar (GER) | 0

=== Men's Lightweight (M60 kg) ===
First round
P Bublis (LTU)
T Đinović (MNE) | RSC
N Zulawinski (SWE) | 0
M Drużga (POL) | 5
F Camen (ROU) | 3
D Öztürk (TUR) | 2
E Israyelyan (ARM) | KO
A Gohar (GER)
O Levente (HUN) | 5
S Kerr (SCO) | 0
G Gordulava (GEO) | 5
A Gregurić (CRO) | 0
A Guliyev (AZE) | 0
O Yarovyi (UKR) | 5
N Birchall (ENG) | 0
J Nevin (IRL) | 5

Second round
I Cernioglo (MDA) | 2
S Oikonomou (GRE) | 3
D Kataja (FIN) | 1
O Lawabna (ISR) | 4
M Maslard (SUI) | 0
T Iliev (BUL) | 5
V Tepić (SRB) | 0
B Bulders (LAT) | 5
T Đinović (MNE) | 5
M Drużga (POL) | 0
F Camen (ROU)
E Israyelyan (ARM) | RSC
O Levente (HUN) | 0
G Gordulava (GEO) | 5
O Yarovyi (UKR) | 3
J Nevin (IRL) | 2

Quarterfinals
S Oikonomou (GRE) | 4
O Lawabna (ISR) | 1
T Iliev (BUL) | 5
B Bulders (LAT) | 0
T Đinović (MNE)
E Israyelyan (ARM) | RSC
G Gordulava (GEO) | 3
O Yarovyi (UKR) | 2

Semifinals
S Oikonomou (GRE) | 1
T Iliev (BUL) | 4
E Israyelyan (ARM) | 5
G Gordulava (GEO) | 0

Final
T Iliev (BUL) | 0
E Israyelyan (ARM) | 5

=== Men's Light Welterweight (M63.5 kg) ===
First round
L Haliti (FIN)
D Kajaia (GEO) | RSC
V Ghayenian (BEL)
O Szot (POL) | RSC
T Benny (ISR)
R Buza (HUN) | RSC
S Korček (CZE) | 4
A Boboc (ROU) | 0
T McDonnell (IRL) | 5
Z Gahramanov (AZE) | 0
A Kostenko (UKR) | 1
A Mkrtchyan (ARM) | 4
S Zelenekas (LTU)
O Mohamed (ENG) | RSC
E Bayburtlu (TUR) | 2
E Kakulov (ESP) | 3

Second round
P Kostouros (GRE) | 5
U Čingelić (SRB) | 0
F Meier (SUI) | 0
I Caravan (MDA) | 5
R Šarovs (LAT) | 4
J Palm (EST) | 1
M Radev (BUL) | 5
A Šljivo (BIH) | 0
D Kajaia (GEO) | 5
O Szot (POL) | 0
R Buza (HUN) | 5
S Korček (CZE) | 0
T McDonnell (IRL) | 0
A Mkrtchyan (ARM) | 5
O Mohamed (ENG) | 5
E Kakulov (ESP) | 0

Quarterfinals
P Kostouros (GRE) | 0
I Caravan (MDA) | 5
R Šarovs (LAT) | 4
M Radev (BUL) | 1
D Kajaia (GEO) | 5
R Buza (HUN) | 0
A Mkrtchyan (ARM) | 2
O Mohamed (ENG) | 3

Semifinals
I Caravan (MDA) | 5
R Šarovs (LAT) | 0
D Kajaia (GEO) | 5
O Mohamed (ENG) | 0

Final
I Caravan (MDA) | 0
D Kajaia (GEO) | 5

=== Men's Welterweight (M67 kg) ===
First round
I Duca (MDA) | 2
D Zinoviy (SWE) | 3
O Boklakh (UKR) | 5
M Petrimán (HUN) | 0
F Tomkić (CRO) | 5
U Veljović (SRB) | 0
W Kaźmierczak (POL) | 5
D Daníček (CZE) | 0
R Schäfer (GER) | 0
J Donovan (IRL) | 5
I Marin (ROU) | 2
M Namazov (GEO) | 3
S Gugliotta (ITA) | 2
S Abdullayev (AZE) | 3
L Lawton (ENG) | 1
K Kanlı (TUR) | 4

Second round
G Coulibaly (ESP) | RSC
R Tomović (BIH)
L Angelov (BUL) | 4
S Horváth (SVK) | 1
A Hakobyan (ARM) | 5
M Makarov (EST) | 0
G Efthymiadis (GRE) | 5
S Abo Shaaban (ISR) | 0
D Zinoviy (SWE) | 0
O Boklakh (UKR) | 5
F Tomkić (CRO) | 5
W Kaźmierczak (POL) | 0
J Donovan (IRL) | 5
M Namazov (GEO) | 0
S Abdullayev (AZE) | 0
K Kanlı (TUR) | 5

Quarterfinals
G Coulibaly (ESP) | 5
L Angelov (BUL) | 0
A Hakobyan (ARM) | 5
G Efthymiadis (GRE) | 0
O Boklakh (UKR) | 5
F Tomkić (CRO) | 0
J Donovan (IRL) | 1
K Kanlı (TUR) | 4

Semifinals
G Coulibaly (ESP) | 0
A Hakobyan (ARM) | 5
O Boklakh (UKR) | 3
K Kanlı (TUR) | 2

Final
A Hakobyan (ARM) | 0
O Boklakh (UKR) | 5

=== Men's Light Middleweight (M71 kg) ===
First round
L Corcoran (WAL)
D Maha (UKR) | RSC
G Guidi (ITA) | 4
K Hoveling (DEN) | 1
L Gémes (HUN) | RSC
K Mitev (BUL)
A Osievschii (MDA)
D Holostenco (AZE) | RSC
M Cumic (GER) | 5
P Dunda (CZE) | 0
S Osmanlı (TUR) | 3
C Karaitis (GRE) | 2
M Trbic (FRA) | 0
D Flood (IRL) | 5
G Akhalaia (GEO) | 3
G Antanosyan (ARM) | 2
M Šarčević (MNE) | 5
S Jiryis (ISR) | 0
P Vilkas (LTU)
V Jonsson (SWE) | RSC
M Vdovitsenko (EST) | 0
L Buzik (CRO) | 4
J Noioso (FIN) | 5
E Hodžić (BIH) | 0

Second round
L Rašić (SLO) | 0
D Țiu (ROU) | 5
R Horváth (SVK) | RSC
D Berisha (KOS)
D Maha (UKR) | 0
G Guidi (ITA) | 5
L Gémes (HUN) | 5
D Holostenco (AZE) | 0
M Cumic (GER) | 4
S Osmanlı (TUR) | 1
D Flood (IRL) | 5
G Akhalaia (GEO) | 0
M Šarčević (MNE) | DSQ
V Jonsson (SWE)
L Buzik (CRO) | 5
J Noioso (FIN) | 0

Quarterfinals
D Țiu (ROU) | 3
R Horváth (SVK) | 0
G Guidi (ITA) | 5
L Gémes (HUN) | 0
M Cumic (GER) | 0
D Flood (IRL) | 5
M Šarčević (MNE) | 5
L Buzik (CRO) | 0

Semifinals
D Țiu (ROU) | 0
G Guidi (ITA) | 5
D Flood (IRL) | WO
M Šarčević (MNE)

Final
G Guidi (ITA) | 0
D Flood (IRL) | 5

=== Men's Middleweight (M75 kg) ===
First round
M Semmo (GER) | RSC
N Simon (HUN)
N Hadjit (BEL) | 5
K Parada (POL) | 0
A Ganiglia (ITA) | 2
M Karadağ (TUR) | 3
O Balabin (UKR) | 5
J Janečka (CZE) | 0
A Arsaev (NOR) | RSC
H Gakić (BIH)
T Sargsyan (ARM) | 0
L Turner (ENG) | 5
G Debanić (CRO) | 5
V Nicolau (MDA) | 0

Second round
K Ņeverovskis (LAT)
S Kvinikadze (GEO) | RSC
S Strahilov (BUL) | 5
I Antonov (EST) | 0
A Babayev (AZE) | 0
A Härstedt (SWE) | 5
R Simić (SRB) | 5
J Olaniyan (IRL) | 0
Y Cesar (FRA) | 4
M Semmo (GER) | 1
N Hadjit (BEL) | 3
M Karadağ (TUR) | 2
O Balabin (UKR) | 5
A Arsaev (NOR) | 0
L Turner (ENG) | 5
G Debanić (CRO) | 0

Quarterfinals
S Kvinikadze (GEO) | 5
S Strahilov (BUL) | 0
A Härstedt (SWE) | 0
R Simić (SRB) | 5
Y Cesar (FRA) | 3
N Hadjit (BEL) | 2
O Balabin (UKR) | 5
L Turner (ENG) | 0

Semifinals
S Kvinikadze (GEO) | 0
R Simić (SRB) | 5
Y Cesar (FRA) | 0
O Balabin (UKR) | 3

Final
R Simić (SRB) | 2
O Balabin (UKR) | 3

=== Men's Light Heavyweight (M80 kg) ===
First round
I Jurcenoks (LAT) | RSC
O Awad (ISR)
A Nicolaev (MDA)
H Adamyan (ARM) | RSC
Z-B Siderov (BUL) | 0
D Kruczkowski (POL) | 5
M Pižurica (SRB) | 5
D Dahl (NOR) | 0
M Tsamalidis (GRE) | RSC
D Shabani (GER)
A Tóth (HUN) | 0
T Marcy (ITA) | 5
V Dudar (UKR) | 2
S Budagov (AZE) | 3
M Doğru (TUR) | 5
R Collins (IRL) | 0

Quarterfinals
I Jurcenoks (LAT) | 0
H Adamyan (ARM) | 5
D Kruczkowski (POL) | 0
M Pižurica (SRB) | 5
M Tsamalidis (GRE) | RSC
T Marcy (ITA)
S Budagov (AZE)
M Doğru (TUR) | RSC

Semifinals
H Adamyan (ARM) | 5
M Pižurica (SRB) | 0
M Tsamalidis (GRE) | RSC
M Doğru (TUR)

Final
H Adamyan (ARM) | 0
M Tsamalidis (GRE) | 5

=== Men's Cruiserweight (M86 kg) ===
First round
D Polák (CZE) | 0
A Aleksanyan (ARM) | 5
D Kuliiev (UKR) | 3
G Dekanozishvili (GEO) | 2
N Ojo (IRL) | 0
P Caruso (ITA) | 5

Quarterfinals
O Türk (TUR) | 5
F Ismayilov (AZE) | 0
T Lėmanas (LTU) | 0
G Stoyanov (BUL) | 5
T Jakupi (KOS) | 3
A Aleksanyan (ARM) | 2
D Kuliiev (UKR) | 0
P Caruso (ITA) | 5

Semifinals
O Türk (TUR) | 0
G Stoyanov (BUL) | 5
T Jakupi (KOS) | 0
P Caruso (ITA) | 5

Final
G Stoyanov (BUL) | WO
P Caruso (ITA)

=== Men's Heavyweight (M92 kg) ===
First round
E Mayue-Belezika (SWE) | 5
M Guluyev (AZE) | 0
A Hovakimyan (ARM) | RSC
G Ersungur (TUR)
A Krasniqi (GER) | 5
D McDonagh (IRL) | 0
M Zasenok (UKR) | 0
D Thomas (ENG) | 5

Quarterfinals
D Syla (KOS) | DSQ
D Cojocari (MDA)
I Kefallinos (GRE) | 0
F Ioniță (ROU) | 5
E Mayue-Belezika (SWE) | 5
A Hovakimyan (ARM) | 0
A Krasniqi (GER) | 0
D Thomas (ENG) | 5

Semifinals
D Syla (KOS) | 0
F Ioniță (ROU) | 5
E Mayue-Belezika (SWE) | 1
D Thomas (ENG) | 4

Final
F Ioniță (ROU) | 0
D Thomas (ENG) | 5

=== Men's Super Heavyweight (M+92 kg) ===
First round
F Kočí (CZE) | 0
K Borisov (BUL) | 5
A Harutyunyan (ARM) | 0
L Pavčec (CRO) | 5
O Zelenskyi (UKR) | ABD
B Cawley (IRL)
D German (ITA)
A Ouchaou (GER) | RSC
E Itauma (ENG) | ABD
T Sharikadze (GEO)
K Tükenmez (TUR) | 3
S Alizada (AZE) | 2

Quarterfinals
Đ Januzaj (SLO) | 0
N Burdiuja (MDA) | 5
K Borisov (BUL) | 3
L Pavčec (CRO) | 2
O Zelenskyi (UKR) | 5
A Ouchaou (GER) | 0
E Itauma (ENG) | RSC
K Tükenmez (TUR)

Semifinals
N Burdiuja (MDA)
K Borisov (BUL) | KO
O Zelenskyi (UKR)
E Itauma (ENG) | RSC

Final
K Borisov (BUL)
E Itauma (ENG) | RSC

=== Women's Minimumweight (W48 kg) ===
First round
E Drăgan (ROU) | 0
L Barceló (ESP) | 5
C Dunn (IRL) | 5
B Neely (SCO) | 0
K Pap (HUN) | 5
O Jakubczyk (POL) | 0
J Erbasecca (ITA) | 0
F Işık (TUR) | 5
S Turbinina (UKR) | 5
M Gittins (ENG) | 0

Quarterfinals
T Samelia (GEO) | 5
M Leuchtmann (GER) | 0
L Atanasova (BUL) | 0
L Barceló (ESP) | 5
C Dunn (IRL) | 5
K Pap (HUN) | 0
F Işık (TUR) | 4
S Turbinina (UKR) | 1

Semifinals
T Samelia (GEO) | 0
L Barceló (ESP) | 5
C Dunn (IRL) | 0
F Işık (TUR) | 5

Final
L Barceló (ESP) | 0
F Işık (TUR) | 5

=== Women's Light Flyweight (W50 kg) ===
First round
TN Uzun (TUR) | 1
P Järvinen (FIN) | 4
J Vollmann (GER) | 4
V Shkeul (UKR) | 1
N Maksymowicz (POL) | 0
E Jones (ENG) | 5

Quarterfinals
S Hamza (ROU) | 1
I Vals del Valle (ESP) | 4
S Čirković (SRB) | 5
S Rosshaug (DEN) | 0
K O'Keeffe (IRL) | 5
P Järvinen (FIN) | 0
J Vollmann (GER) | 4
E Jones (ENG) | 1

Semifinals
I Vals del Valle (ESP) | 0
S Čirković (SRB) | 5
K O'Keeffe (IRL) | 1
J Vollmann (GER) | 4

Final
S Čirković (SRB) | RSC
J Vollmann (GER)

=== Women's Flyweight (W52 kg) ===
First round
G Weerheim (NED) | 1
D Jovanović (SRB) | 4
D Wawszczyk (POL) | 2
S Grin (GER) | 3
L Mackie (ENG) | 5
E Lambe (IRL) | 0
K Mopin (FRA) | 5
N Boyadzhieva (BUL) | 0
P Özkan (TUR) | RSC
A De Persio (ITA)
L Mairena (ESP) | 5
C Csorba (HUN) | 0
M Hidigan (ROU) | 1
A Kovalenko (UKR) | 4

Quarterfinals
E Cholidi (GRE) | 0
D Jovanović (SRB) | 3
S Grin (GER) | 1
L Mackie (ENG) | 3
K Mopin (FRA) | 5
P Özkan (TUR) | 0
L Mairena (ESP) | 3
A Kovalenko (UKR) | 1

Semifinals
D Jovanović (SRB) | 1
L Mackie (ENG) | 4
K Mopin (FRA) | 3
L Mairena (ESP) | 2

Final
L Mackie (ENG) | 0
K Mopin (FRA) | 5

=== Women's Bantamweight (W54 kg) ===
First round
K Tütüncü (TUR) | 5
I Dévényi (HUN) | 0
W Milewska (POL)
S Donoghue (IRL) | RSC
AM Romantov (ROU) | 0
M Sannino (ITA) | 5
E Whitworth (ENG) | 5
C Bachelet (FRA) | 0
L-S Helms (GER) | 0
I Melnyk (UKR) | 4

Quarterfinals
B Lovašová (SVK) | 5
I Ciubova (MDA) | 0
K Staneva (BUL) | 0
K Tütüncü (TUR) | 4
S Donoghue (IRL) | 0
M Sannino (ITA) | 5
E Whitworth (ENG) | 5
I Melnyk (UKR) | 0

Semifinals
B Lovašová (SVK) | 3
K Tütüncü (TUR) | 1
M Sannino (ITA) | 0
E Whitworth (ENG) | 5

Final
B Lovašová (SVK) | 0
E Whitworth (ENG) | 5

=== Women's Featherweight (W57 kg) ===
First round
S Sürmeneli (TUR) | 5
E Nagy (HUN) | 0
S Duna (SWE) | 2
A Kramarenko (UKR) | 3
P Howarth (ENG) | 5
K Čajanová (CZE) | 0
A Ari (GER) | RSC
Y Meredith (IRL)

Quarterfinals
R Aleksandrova (BUL) | 4
Đ Miletić (SRB) | 1
N Banciu (ROU)
L Jakovļeva (LAT) | RSC
S Sürmeneli (TUR) | 5
A Kramarenko (UKR) | 0
P Howarth (ENG) | 0
A Ari (GER) | 5

Semifinals
R Aleksandrova (BUL) | 0
L Jakovļeva (LAT) | 5
S Sürmeneli (TUR)
A Ari (GER) | RSC

Final
L Jakovļeva (LAT) | 1
A Ari (GER) | 4

=== Women's Lightweight (W60 kg) ===
First round
S Melgaard (NOR) | 0
C Koutsochristou (GER) | 5
L Acconcia (ITA)
T Kubalová (SVK) | RSC

Quarterfinals
A Cyrek (POL) | RSC
T Motogna (ROU)
F Deák (HUN) | 0
Y Frantsi (FIN) | 5
T Dovhal (UKR) | 5
R Kaya (TUR) | 0
C Koutsochristou (GER) | 0
T Kubalová (SVK) | 5

Semifinals
A Cyrek (POL) | 2
Y Frantsi (FIN) | 3
T Dovhal (UKR) | 4
T Kubalová (SVK) | 1

Final
Y Frantsi (FIN) | 0
T Dovhal (UKR) | 5

=== Women's Light Welterweight (W63 kg) ===
First round
I Dragišić (BIH)
J Rutkowska (POL) | RSC

Quarterfinals
V Marra (ITA) | RSC
S Biçil (TUR)
Y Filipova (UKR) | 0
W McDonagh (IRL) | 3
V Tileva (BUL)
L Tutal (GER) | RSC
P Requena (ESP)
J Rutkowska (POL) | RSC

Semifinals
V Marra (ITA) | 5
W McDonagh (IRL) | 0
L Tutal (GER) | 4
J Rutkowska (POL) | 1

Final
V Marra (ITA) | RSC
L Tutal (GER)

=== Women's Welterweight (W66 kg) ===
First round
S Zabudska-Niedielcho (UKR) | 3
HN Şeker (TUR) | 2
K Turbucz (HUN) | 0
S Reiber (GER) | 5
V Jokinen (FIN)
K Zārberga (LAT) | RSC

Quarterfinals
M Richol (FRA) | 5
G Mongan (IRL) | 0
C Sebe (ROU) | RSC
A Halilović (BIH)
A Jankowiak (POL) | 5
S Zabudska-Niedielcho (UKR) | 0
S Reiber (GER) | 1
K Zārberga (LAT) | 4

Semifinals
M Richol (FRA) | 0
C Sebe (ROU) | 5
A Jankowiak (POL) | 5
K Zārberga (LAT) | 0

Final
C Sebe (ROU) | RSC
A Jankowiak (POL)

=== Women's Light Middleweight (W70 kg) ===
First round
M Adkins (ENG) | 5
C Schünemann (GER) | 0
F Erol (TUR)
L Moran (IRL) | RSC

Quarterfinals
A Brahimi (KOS) | 0
N Kovács (HUN) | 5
V Nakota (UKR) | RSC
A Cretu (ROU)
O Czerwińska (POL) | 5
G Maniero (ITA) | 0
M Adkins (ENG) | 2
L Moran (IRL) | 3

Semifinals
N Kovács (HUN) | 0
V Nakota (UKR) | 5
O Czerwińska (POL) | 0
L Moran (IRL) | 5

Final
V Nakota (UKR) | 3
L Moran (IRL) | 2

=== Women's Middleweight (W75 kg) ===
First round
G Marelli (ITA) | 4
Y Düztaş (TUR) | 1

Quarterfinals
Y Ilyazova (BUL)
A Moss-Birch (ENG) | RSC
E Keating (IRL)
S Hofstad (NOR) | ABD
Y Zhyboiedova (UKR) | RSC
M Cimpoeru (ROU)
T Bukia (GEO) | 4
G Marelli (ITA) | 1

Semifinals
A Moss-Birch (ENG) | 0
S Hofstad (NOR) | 5
Y Zhyboiedova (UKR)
T Bukia (GEO) | RSC

Final
S Hofstad (NOR) | WO
T Bukia (GEO)

=== Women's Light Heavyweight (W81 kg) ===
Quarterfinals
M Botica (ROU)
K Airapetian (UKR) | RSC
M Pępek (POL) | 0
D Tinnelly (IRL) | 5
S Sørensen (NOR) | RSC
EN Lök (TUR)

Semifinals
A Meliss (EST)
K Airapetian (UKR) | RSC
D Tinnelly (IRL) | 5
S Sørensen (NOR) | 0

Final
K Airapetian (UKR) | 0
D Tinnelly (IRL) | 5

=== Women's Heavyweight (W+81 kg) ===
First round
P Chernenko (UKR) | 5
F Kadıköylü (TUR) | 0

Quarterfinals
S Glaser (GER) | 0
W Bochen (POL) | 5
Z Szira (HUN) | 0
C D'Arcy (IRL) | 5
K Aglinskaitė (LTU) | RSC
G Georgieva (BUL)
I Parpa (ROU)
P Chernenko (UKR) | RSC

Semifinals
W Bochen (POL) | 0
C D'Arcy (IRL) | 5
K Aglinskaitė (LTU)
P Chernenko (UKR) | RSC

Final
C D'Arcy (IRL) | 4
P Chernenko (UKR) | 1
