= Büşra Işıldar =

Turkish boxer (born 2002)

Personal information
- Born: 1 January 2002 (age 24) Istanbul, Turkey
- Height: 1.80 m (5 ft 11 in)
- Weight: Middleweight

Boxing career
Medal record
Women's amateur boxing
Representing Turkey
IBA World Championships
Silver medal – second place	2025 Niš	Light heavyweight
WB World Championships
Silver medal – second place	2025 Liverpool	75 kg
EUBC European Championships
Bronze medal – third place	2024 Belgrade	Middleweight
EB European Championships
Silver medal – second place	2026 Sofia	75 kg
European U23 Championships
Gold medal – first place	2023 Budva	Middleweight
Gold medal – first place	2024 Sofia	Middleweight
World Junior Championships
Gold medal – first place	2021 Kielce	Light heavyweight
European Junior Championships
Gold medal – first place	2019 Sofia	Heavyweight
European Youth Championships
Gold medal – first place	2017 Sofia	Light heavyweight
Gold medal – first place	2018 Anapa	Heavyweight

Büşra Işıldar (born 2002) is a Turkish boxer competing in the Middleweight (75 kg) division.

== Boxing career ==
She was born in 2002 in Istanbul. She is the second child and only daughter of a family of four children. She lost her father at a young age. When she was 14 years old, Büşra Işıldar started boxing to get rid of her excess weight.

In 2017, she won the gold medal in the Turkey Youth, Junior and Senior Women's Individual Boxing Championship held in Muğla's Fethiye district, which was the first tournament she participated in after winning the Istanbul championship. In 2018 and 2019, she became the champion of Turkey.

She became champion for the first time in 2017 at 80 kg in the European Youth Girls Boxing Championships. She won the European championship for the second time by competing in the final at +80 kg at the European Youth Girls Boxing Championships held in Anapa, Russia in 2018, in 2019, she competed at +81 kg in the championship held in Sofia, the capital of Bulgaria, and won the European championship for the third time at the 2019 European Junior Championships.

In 2021, she participated in the 81 kg final bout at the 2021 AIBA Youth World Boxing Championships organised by the International Boxing Association (AIBA) in Poland and won the gold medal.

Büşra Işıldar became the European Champion at the U22 European Boxing Championships hosted by Budva, Montenegro. Competing in the 75 kg final, Büşra Işıldar defeated her Ukrainian rival Veronika Nakota 4-1 and completed the organisation with a gold medal.
