= Damar Thomas =

English boxer (born 2004)

Personal information
- Nationality: (England) English
- Born: 31 December 2004 (age 21)
- Height: 6 ft 6 in (198 cm)

Sport
- Sport: Boxing
- Weight class: Heavyweight, Super-heavyweight
- Club: Powerday Hooks ABC
Medal record
Men's amateur boxing
Representing England
European Championships
Silver medal – second place	2026 Sofia	+90 kg
Commonwealth Games
Gold medal – first place	2026 Glasgow	+90 kg
IBA Youth World Championships
Silver medal – second place	2022 La Nucia	92kg
European Youth Championships
Gold medal – first place	2022 Sofia	92kg

Damar Thomas (born 31 December 2004) is an English boxer. He won the gold medal in the +90 kg division at the 2026 Commonwealth Games.

== Career ==
A southpaw, Thomas won a silver medal in the 92 kg division at the 2022 Youth World Boxing Championships and a gold medal in the same weight category at the 2022 European Youth Boxing Championships.

He won the elite 92 kg division at the 2023 England Boxing National Amateur Championships.

Thomas was selected to represent England in the +90 kg division at the 2025 World Championships, where he was eliminated in the quarter-finals.

He was chosen to represent England at the 2026 Commonwealth Games in Glasgow. Competing in the +90 kg division, Thomas won the gold medal after defeating India's Narender Berwal in the final.

At the 2026 European Championships in Sofia, Bulgaria, Thomas won the silver medal in the +90 kg division, recording unanimous decision successes over Mücahit İlyas from Turkey, Nikoloz Begadze of Georgia and Azerbaijan's Mahammad Abdullayev to reach the final, where he lost 3:2 to David Surov from Russia.
