= 2026 European Boxing Championships – Men's 60 kg =

Men's 60 kg at the 2026 European Boxing Championships
- Venue: Asics Arena
- Location: Sofia, Bulgaria
- Dates: 18–25 September
- Competitors: 26 from 26 nations

Medalists
gold medal	Radoslav Rosenov	Bulgaria
silver medal	Aider Abduraimov	Ukraine
bronze medal	Ewart Marín	Spain
bronze medal	Alen Rustemovski	North Macedonia

The men's 60 kg competition at the 2026 European Boxing Championships was held from 18 to 25 September 2026.

== Results ==
=== Final ===
Final; 25 September
(Bulgaria) Radoslav Rosenov	5
(Ukraine) Aider Abduraimov	0

=== Top half ===
Round of 32; 18 September
(Georgia (country)) Giorgi Kapanadze	2
(Romania) Andrei Găvae	3
(Russia) Vsevolod Shumkov	5
(Portugal) Sérgio Rodrigues	0
(Montenegro) Tomislav Đinović	0
(Turkey) Mehmethan Çınar	5
(Belarus) Maksim Pankou
(Spain) Ewart Marín	RSC
(Slovakia) Maksym Bočarov	0
(Republic of Ireland) Jude Gallagher	5

Round of 16; 21 September
(Bulgaria) Radoslav Rosenov	5
(Romania) Andrei Găvae	0
(Russia) Vsevolod Shumkov	4
(Turkey) Mehmethan Çınar	0
(Netherlands) Mahmoud Al Chabtoun	0
(Spain) Ewart Marín	5
(Republic of Ireland) Jude Gallagher	RSC
(France) Lounès Hamraoui

Quarter-finals; 23 September
(Bulgaria) Radoslav Rosenov	3
(Russia) Vsevolod Shumkov	2
(Spain) Ewart Marín	3
(Republic of Ireland) Jude Gallagher	2

Semifinals; 24 September
(Bulgaria) Radoslav Rosenov	4
(Spain) Ewart Marín	1

=== Bottom half ===
Round of 32; 18 September
(Moldova) Vladislav Vascovskyi	0
(Germany) Denis Bril	5
(Azerbaijan) Mahammadali Ashiraliyev	5
(Lithuania) Edgaras Skurdelis	0
(Italy) Giuseppe Canonico	5
(Israel) Abdallah Rahal	0
(Greece) Georgios Pleas	0
(Armenia) Artur Bazeyan	5
(Luxembourg) Benik Melkumian	0
(North Macedonia) Alen Rustemovski	5

Round of 16; 21 September
(Poland) Paweł Brach	5
(Germany) Denis Bril	0
(Azerbaijan) Mahammadali Ashiraliyev	2
(Ukraine) Aider Abduraimov	3
(Italy) Giuseppe Canonico	0
(Armenia) Artur Bazeyan	5
(North Macedonia) Alen Rustemovski	4
(England) William Hewitt	1

Quarter-finals; 23 September
(Poland) Paweł Brach	0
(Ukraine) Aider Abduraimov	5
(Armenia) Artur Bazeyan	1
(North Macedonia) Alen Rustemovski	4

Semifinals; 24 September
(Ukraine) Aider Abduraimov	4
(North Macedonia) Alen Rustemovski	1
