= Aider Abduraimov =

Ukrainian boxer (born 2004)

Aider Abduraimov Айдер Бахтіярович Абдураїмов
Personal information
- Nationality: Ukrainian
- Born: 18 January 2004 (age 22) Melitopol, Ukraine
- Height: 1.73 m (5 ft 8 in)
- Weight: Bantamweight (up to 2021); Featherweight (since 2022)

Boxing career
- Stance: Universal
Medal record
Men's amateur boxing
Representing Ukraine
European Boxing Championships
Silver medal – second place	2026 Sofia	60 kg
Asian Championships
Bronze medal – third place	2024 Chiang Mai	Lightweight
European Youth Championships
Gold medal – first place	2021 Budva	Bantamweight
Gold medal – first place	2022 Sofia	Featherweight

Aider Abduraimov (Ukrainian: Айдер Бахтіярович Абдураїмов; born 18 January 2004 in Melitopol, Ukraine) is a Ukrainian amateur boxer. He is a two-time European youth champion (2021 and 2022) as well as 2023 Ukrainian champion representing Kharkiv Oblast. He is currently coached by Serhiy Danylchenko, who won a bronze medal in the bantamweight category at 2000 Summer Olympics.

Abduraimov competed at the 2024 World Boxing Olympic Qualification Tournament 2 in Bangkok, where he won a quota for the 2024 Summer Olympics. At the tournament, he defeated 2016 silver medallist Yoel Finol from Venezuela, 2023 African Games silver medallist Mwengo Mwale from Zambia, Asror Vokhidov from Tajikistan, Denis Bril from Germany and 2023 Worlds bronze medallist Munarbek Seitbek Uulu from Kyrgyzstan. Representing Ukraine at the 2024 Summer Olympics in the men's featherweight tournament, he was defeated in the round of sixteen by Bulgarian Javier Ibáñez.

== Personal life ==
Abduraimov is a Crimean Tatar. He is student of Kharkiv State Academy of Physical Culture within the Department of Athletics and Power Sports.
