= Sunniva Hofstad =

Norwegian boxer (born 2004)

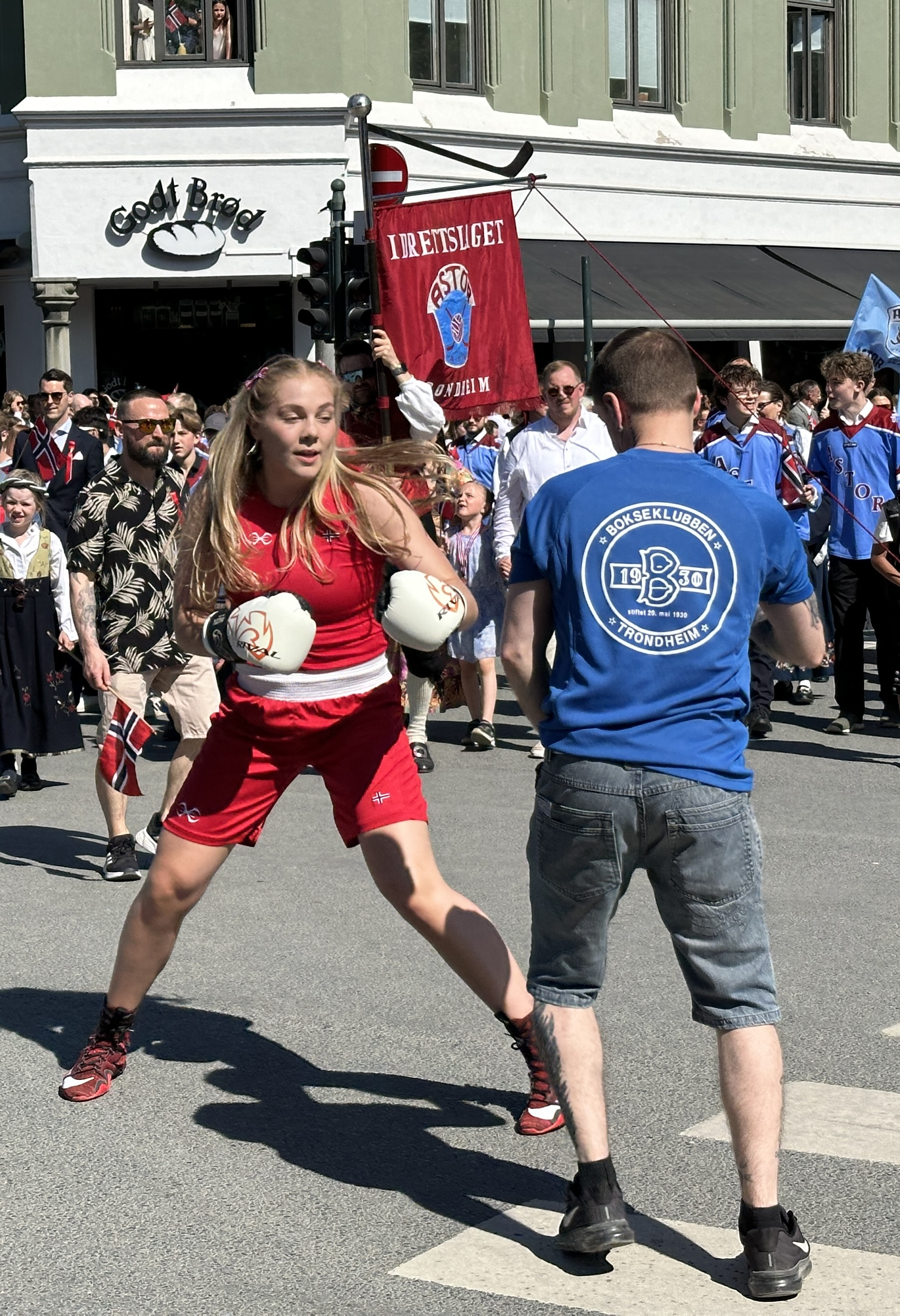
- Hofstad in 2024

Personal information
- Born: 17 July 2004 (age 22) Trondheim, Norway
- Height: 1.75 m (5 ft 9 in)

Sport
- Sport: Boxing
- Weight class: 75 kg
Medal record
Women's amateur boxing
Representing Norway
EB European Championships
| Bronze medal – third place | 2026 Sofia | 75 kg |
Junior World Championships
| Gold medal – first place | 2022 La Nucia | 75 kg |

Sunniva Hofstad (born 17 July 2004) is a Norwegian boxer. She is junior world champion from 2022, European junior champion from 2021 and 2022, and qualified to compete in the 2024 Summer Olympics.

== Career ==
Born in Trondheim on 17 July 2004, Hofstad won a gold medal in the middleweight class (75 kg) at the 2022 IBA Youth World Boxing Championships. She won European junior championships titles in both 2021 and 2022.

Competing at an Olympic qualification tournament in March 2024, she qualified to the 75 kg class at the Olympics. In May 2024 she was officially selected to represent Norway at the 2024 Summer Olympics. She is the first female Norwegian boxer to ever qualify for the Olympic Games. She was defeated by former world champion Lovlina Borgohain in the first round.

In September 2025 she took part in the 2025 World Boxing Championships in Liverpool, competing in Women's 75 kg where she was ranked second at the start of the championships. At the 2026 European Championships, Hofstad won a bronze medal in the 75 kg division.
