= 2026 European Boxing Championships – Women's 75 kg =

Women's 75 kg at the 2026 European Boxing Championships
- Venue: Asics Arena
- Location: Sofia, Bulgaria
- Dates: 19–25 September
- Competitors: 13 from 13 nations

Medalists
gold medal	Aoife O'Rourke	Ireland
silver medal	Büşra Işıldar	Turkey
bronze medal	Saltanat Medenova	Russia
bronze medal	Sunniva Hofstad	Norway

The women's 75 kg competition at the 2026 European Boxing Championships was held from 19 to 25 September 2026.

== Results ==
Round of 16; 19 September
(Poland) Agata Kaczmarska	5
(France) Davina Michel	0
(Spain) Alma García	5
(Hungary) Réka Hoffmann	0
(Russia) Saltanat Medenova	4
(England) Mary-Kate Smith	1
(Lithuania) Iveta Lešinskytė	0
(Czech Republic) Monika Langerová	5
(Germany) Helena Engels	3
(Ukraine) Raisa Piskun	0

Quarterfinals; 22 September
(Republic of Ireland) Aoife O'Rourke	3
(Poland) Agata Kaczmarska	2
(Spain) Alma García
(Russia) Saltanat Medenova	RSC
(Norway) Sunniva Hofstad	w/o
(Czech Republic) Monika Langerová
(Germany) Helena Engels	0
(Turkey) Büşra Işıldar	5

Semifinals; 23 September
(Republic of Ireland) Aoife O'Rourke	4
(Russia) Saltanat Medenova	1
(Norway) Sunniva Hofstad	2
(Turkey) Büşra Işıldar	3

Final; 25 September
(Republic of Ireland) Aoife O'Rourke	5
(Turkey) Büşra Işıldar	0
