= 2025 IBA Women's World Boxing Championships – Light heavyweight =

Light heavyweight at the 2025 IBA Women's World Boxing Championships
- Venue: Sportski centar Čair
- Location: Niš, Serbia
- Dates: 11–14 March (preliminaries/semifinals); 16 March (final)
- Competitors: 13 from 13 nations

Medalists
gold medal	Saltanat Medenova	Russia
silver medal	Büşra Işıldar	Turkey
bronze medal	Wang Xiaomeng	China
bronze medal	Hasna Larti	Morocco

The Light heavyweight competition at the 2025 IBA Women's World Boxing Championships was held from 11 to 16 March 2025.

== Results ==
Round of 16
(China) Wang Xiaomeng	5
(Kazakhstan) Gulsaya Yerzhan	0
(Uzbekistan) Sokhiba Ruzmetova	4
(Cuba) Yoana Rodríguez	3
(Germany) Sarah Scheurich	0
(Turkey) Büşra Işıldar	5
(Russia) Saltanat Medenova	RSC
(French Polynesia) Veroiti Nena
(Serbia) Elma Hajrović
(Morocco) Hasna Larti	RSC

Quarter-finals
(Kenya) Elizabeth Andiego
(China) Wang Xiaomeng	RSC
(Uzbekistan) Sokhiba Ruzmetova	0
(Turkey) Büşra Işıldar	5
(Romania) Maria Cimpoeru
(Russia) Saltanat Medenova	RSC
(Morocco) Hasna Larti	RSC
(Belarus) Victoriya Kebikava

Semi-finals
(China) Wang Xiaomeng	1
(Turkey) Büşra Işıldar	4
(Russia) Saltanat Medenova	5
(Morocco) Hasna Larti	0

Final
(Turkey) Büşra Işıldar	1
(Russia) Saltanat Medenova	4
