= 2022 IBA Youth World Boxing Championships =

- Venue: Ciudad Deportiva Camilo Cano
- Location: La Nucia, Spain
- Dates: 14–26 November 2022
- Competitors: 598 from 73 nations

The 2022 IBA Youth World Boxing Championships (22nd) were held in La Nucia, Spain, from 14 to 26 November 2022. The competition was held under the supervision of IBA, the world's governing body for amateur boxing, and was open to boxers born in 2004 and 2005. It was the fourth time in the tournament's history that men and women have fought in the same championship.

== Medalists ==
=== Men ===
| Event | Gold | Silver | Bronze |
|---|---|---|---|
| Minimumweight (48 kg) | Vishvanath Suresh; India | Ronel Suyom; Philippines | Juan Manuel López Jr. Puerto Rico Rafael Lozano; Spain |
| Flyweight (51 kg) | Ari Bonilla; Mexico | Ewart Marín; Cuba | Wacharakorn Junthasorn; Thailand Rui Yamaguchi; Japan |
| Bantamweight (54 kg) | Yuta Sakai; Japan | Ashish; India | Gor Ayvazyan; Georgia Khujanazar Nortojiev; Uzbekistan |
| Featherweight (57 kg) | Bakhtiyor Asadov; Uzbekistan | Gael Cabrera; Mexico | Cornellio Phipps; United States Marwan Mouflih; France |
| Lightweight (60 kg) | Erik Israyelyan; Armenia | Gocha Gordulava; Georgia | Nelson Birchall; England Lee McEvoy; Ireland |
| Light welterweight (63.5 kg) | Vanshaj; India | Demur Kajaia; Georgia | Dedrick Crocklem; United States Bartłomiej Rośkowicz; Poland |
| Welterweight (67 kg) | Javokhir Ummataliev; Uzbekistan | Nurbek Mursal; Kazakhstan | Levi Barnes; England Jim Donovan; Ireland |
| Light middleweight (71 kg) | Fazliddin Erkinboev; Uzbekistan | Levente Gémes; Hungary | Pedro Veitía; Cuba Christos Karaitis; Greece |
| Middleweight (75 kg) | Turabek Khabibullaev; Uzbekistan | Daulet Tulemissov; Kazakhstan | Kryhztian Barrera; Cuba Noa Hadjit; Belgium |
| Light heavyweight (80 kg) | Mykyta Zasenok; Ukraine | Rakhmatullo Boymatov; Uzbekistan | Ricardo Candido de Oliveira Filho; Brazil Luis Reynoso; Cuba |
| Cruiserweight (86 kg) | Ronny Álvarez; Cuba | Paolo Caruso; Italy | Nathan Ojo; Ireland Dzhamal Kuliiev; Ukraine |
| Heavyweight (92 kg) | Adrián Fresneda; Cuba | Damar Thomas; England | Mostfa Abdelzahr Khaled; Egypt Florin Ioniță; Romania |
| Super heavyweight (+92 kg) | Moses Itauma; England | Oleksandr Zelenskyi; Ukraine | Stylianos Roulias; Greece Choi In-ho; South Korea |

=== Women ===
| Event | Gold | Silver | Bronze |
|---|---|---|---|
| Minimumweight (48 kg) | Gulsevar Ganieva; Uzbekistan | Bhawna Sharma; India | Novoanny Núñez; Dominican Republic Gulnaz Buribayeva; Kazakhstan |
| Light Flyweight (50 kg) | Sara Ćirković; Serbia | Sofie Rosshaug; Denmark | Tamanna; India Nguyễn Thị Ngọc Trân; Vietnam |
| Flyweight (52 kg) | Devika Ghorpade; India | Lauren Mackie; England | Sa'Rai Brown-El; United States Miyu Suzuki; Japan |
| Bantamweight (54 kg) | Elina Bazarova; Kazakhstan | Chrisovalantou Koutsochristou; Germany | Gabriella Weerheim; Netherlands Kamonchanok Chupradit; Thailand |
| Featherweight (57 kg) | Yoseline Perez; United States | Asya Ari; Germany | Emily Whitworth; England Sıla Sürmeneli; Turkey |
| Lightweight (60 kg) | Maud van der Toorn; Netherlands | Tetiana Dovhal; Ukraine | Kunjarani Devi Thongam; India Tamara Kubalová; Slovakia |
| Light welterweight (63 kg) | Ravina; India | Megan de Cler; Netherlands | Assem Tanatar; Kazakhstan Daniela Herrera; Argentina |
| Welterweight (66 kg) | Bakyt Seidish; Kazakhstan | Carlotta Schünemann; Germany | Maëlys Richol; France Juliannys Álvarez; Venezuela |
| Light middleweight (70 kg) | Veronika Nakota; Ukraine | Aziza Zokirova; Uzbekistan | Lashu Yadav; India Laura Moran; Ireland |
| Middleweight (75 kg) | Sunniva Hofstad; Norway | Angie Solano; Colombia | Muskan; India Sakhobat Khusanova; Uzbekistan |
| Light heavyweight (81 kg) | Amber Moss-Birch; England | Oltinoy Sotimboeva; Uzbekistan | Dearbhla Tinnelly; Ireland Sofia Stigen Sørensen; Norway |
| Heavyweight (+81 kg) | Cliona D'Arcy; Ireland | Kirti; India | Weronika Bochen; Poland Assel Toktassyn; Kazakhstan |

== Medal table ==
* Host nation (Spain)

| Rank | Nation | Gold | Silver | Bronze | Total |
|---|---|---|---|---|---|
| 1 | Uzbekistan | 5 | 3 | 2 | 10 |
| 2 | India | 4 | 3 | 4 | 11 |
| 3 | England | 2 | 2 | 3 | 7 |
| 3 | Kazakhstan | 2 | 2 | 3 | 7 |
| 5 | Ukraine | 2 | 2 | 1 | 5 |
| 6 | Cuba | 2 | 1 | 3 | 6 |
| 7 | Netherlands | 1 | 1 | 1 | 3 |
| 8 | Mexico | 1 | 1 | 0 | 2 |
| 9 | Ireland | 1 | 0 | 5 | 6 |
| 10 | United States | 1 | 0 | 3 | 4 |
| 11 | Japan | 1 | 0 | 2 | 3 |
| 12 | Norway | 1 | 0 | 1 | 2 |
| 13 | Armenia | 1 | 0 | 0 | 1 |
| 13 | Serbia | 1 | 0 | 0 | 1 |
| 15 | Germany | 0 | 3 | 0 | 3 |
| 16 | Georgia | 0 | 2 | 1 | 3 |
| 17 | Colombia | 0 | 1 | 0 | 1 |
| 17 | Denmark | 0 | 1 | 0 | 1 |
| 17 | Hungary | 0 | 1 | 0 | 1 |
| 17 | Italy | 0 | 1 | 0 | 1 |
| 17 | Philippines | 0 | 1 | 0 | 1 |
| 22 | France | 0 | 0 | 2 | 2 |
| 22 | Greece | 0 | 0 | 2 | 2 |
| 22 | Poland | 0 | 0 | 2 | 2 |
| 22 | Thailand | 0 | 0 | 2 | 2 |
| 26 | Argentina | 0 | 0 | 1 | 1 |
| 26 | Belgium | 0 | 0 | 1 | 1 |
| 26 | Brazil | 0 | 0 | 1 | 1 |
| 26 | Dominican Republic | 0 | 0 | 1 | 1 |
| 26 | Egypt | 0 | 0 | 1 | 1 |
| 26 | Puerto Rico | 0 | 0 | 1 | 1 |
| 26 | Romania | 0 | 0 | 1 | 1 |
| 26 | Slovakia | 0 | 0 | 1 | 1 |
| 26 | South Korea | 0 | 0 | 1 | 1 |
| 26 | Spain* | 0 | 0 | 1 | 1 |
| 26 | Turkey | 0 | 0 | 1 | 1 |
| 26 | Venezuela | 0 | 0 | 1 | 1 |
| 26 | Vietnam | 0 | 0 | 1 | 1 |
| Totals (38 entries) | | 25 | 25 | 50 | 100 |

== Participating nations ==
A total of 598 boxers from 73 nations participated.

- Albania (4)
- Argentina (5)
- Armenia (11)
- Australia (8)
- Azerbaijan (13)
- Belgium (5)
- Bolivia (4)
- Bosnia and Herzegovina (1)
- Brazil (3)
- Bulgaria (6)
- Cameroon (4)
- Canada (7)
- Cape Verde (1)
- Chinese Taipei (11)
- Colombia (12)
- Croatia (5)
- Cuba (8)
- Czech Republic (5)
- Denmark (3)
- Dominican Republic (7)
- Ecuador (4)
- Egypt (5)
- El Salvador (1)
- England (12)
- Estonia (6)
- Finland (7)
- France (6)
- Georgia (9)
- Germany (14)
- Greece (8)
- Guatemala (3)
- Hungary (14)
- India (25)
- Iraq (1)
- Iran (5)
- Ireland (24)
- Israel (6)
- Italy (11)
- Japan (16)
- Kazakhstan (25)
- Kyrgyzstan (12)
- Latvia (6)
- Lithuania (6)
- Malta (2)
- Mexico (21)
- Moldova (7)
- Mongolia (10)
- Morocco (2)
- Netherlands (3)
- New Zealand (2)
- Norway (3)
- Palestine (2)
- Panama (2)
- Philippines (6)
- Poland (19)
- Puerto Rico (8)
- Romania (14)
- Saudi Arabia (4)
- Scotland (6)
- Serbia (5)
- Slovakia (6)
- Slovenia (2)
- South Korea (12)
- Spain (16)
- Sweden (1)
- Thailand (11)
- Trinidad and Tobago (1)
- Turkey (22)
- Ukraine (25)
- United States (9)
- Uzbekistan (21)
- Venezuela (4)
- Vietnam (3)
