= Erik Israyelyan =

Armenian boxer

Personal information
- Nationality: Armenian
- Born: 2004 (age 21–22) Armenia
- Weight: Lightweight

Boxing career

Boxing record
- Total fights: 16
- Wins: 15
- Win by KO: 1
- Losses: 1
Medal record
Representing Armenia
Youth and Junior World Boxing Championships
Gold medal – first place	2022 Spain	-60 kg
European Amateur Boxing Championships
Bronze medal – third place	2021 Montenegro	-60 kg
Gold medal – first place	2022 Bulgaria	-60 kg

Erik Israyelyan (In Armenian:Էրիկ Իսրայելյանի; born 2004) is an Armenian boxer who won gold medals at the 2022 Youth European Boxing Championships and the 2022 IBA Youth World Boxing Championships.

== Information ==
Israyelyan competes in the 60 kg/132 lb weight class in boxing. He began his international boxing career in October 2021, with a victory over Eusebiu Tirzoman. He won a bronze medal in October 2021 at the 2021 EUBC Youth European Boxing Championships. As of April 2023, he holds a 15-1 amateur boxing record.

Israyelyan notably trains separately from the national team. In April 2022, Israyelyan captured the gold medal in the 60 kg weight class at the 2022 Youth European Boxing Championships. He had three knockout wins in the tournament. Later in the year, Israelyan captured the gold medal in the 60 kg weight class at the 2022 IBA Youth World Boxing Championships by defeating Gocha Gordulava in the championship match. Israyelyan became the fourth Armenian world champion with his victory.

Israyelyan became the subject of controversy in March 2023, when he voiced complaints about not being awarded the money he was promised for winning the gold medal at the Youth European Boxing Championships and over a lack of appreciation for his boxing achievements. He later announced that he would be renouncing his Armenian citizenship over the issue. The president of the Armenian Boxing Federation, Hovhannes Hovsepyan, accused him of blackmail over the situation.
