= Amber Moss-Birch =

English boxer (born 2005)

Personal information
- Born: 14 August 2005 (age 20) Southampton, Hampshire, England
- Height: 5 ft 5 in (165 cm)

Sport
- Sport: Boxing
- Weight class: Middleweight, Light-heavyweight
- Club: Rotunda ABC
Medal record
Women's amateur boxing
Representing England
IBA Youth World Boxing Championships
Gold medal – first place	2022 La Nucia	81kg
European School Boxing Championships
Gold medal – first place	2019 Tbilisi	70kg
European Youth Boxing Championships
Bronze medal – third place	2022 Sofia	75kg

Amber Moss-Birch (born 14 August 2005) is an English boxer. She won a gold medal in the 81kg division at the 2022 Youth World Boxing Championships. Moss-Birch also won gold at the 2019 European School Boxing Championships in the 70kg category and bronze in the 75kg division at the 2022 European Youth Boxing Championships.
