= Virat Vachirarattanawong =

- Born: November 25, 1947 (age 78); Bangkok, Thailand
- Occupations: Muay Thai and Professional boxing manager and promoter
- Years active: 1975–present
- Spouse: Pawinee Wachirarattanawong
- Children: Nattadej "Boat" Wachirarattanawong (son); Thanis "Bet" Wachirarattanawong (daughter)
- Relatives: Piyarat "Tung" Wachirarattanawong (cousin)

Virat Vachirarattanawong (Thai: วิรัตน์ วชิรรัตนวงศ์; born: November 25, 1947 in Bangkok) is a Thai Muay Thai and professional boxing promoter. He is the founder and chairman of Petchyindee Boxing Promotions aka Diamond Boxing Promotions, a Muay Thai and professional boxing promotion company based in Bangkok. He has a nickname "Sia Nao" (เสี่ยเน้า, lit. 'Tycoon Nao').

== Biography ==
Virat was born into a wealthy Sino-Thai family in Bangkok, with the family business specializing in diamonds and gold. Their jewelry shops were located in Banglampoo and Phahurat. In his early twenties, Virat became involved in the fighting scene by regularly attending Muay Thai matches at Rajadamnern Stadium and Lumpinee Stadium. His first experience watching a Muay Thai fight at a stadium was in 1969 at Rajadamnern Stadium, when he was a high school student at Assumption College Sriracha. He attended the event with his older brother, where the main fight featured Den Srisothorn vs Thongbai Charoenmuang.

In 1975, Virat established the "Petchyindee" Muay Thai gym. Many successful fighters competed under his stable, including champions such as Ruengsak Petchyindee, Sagatthong Petchyindee, Sirimongkol Luksiripat, Sagat Petchyindee, Yodsanklai Fairtex, Sam-A Kaiyanghadaogym, and Phetmorakot Wor Sangprapai.

By 1982, he had become a regular promoter at Lumpinee Stadium, organizing Muay Thai events under the banner "Suek Petchyindee" (ศึกเพชรยินดี).

In 1992, Virat expanded into professional boxing, successfully launching the careers of numerous fighters, including Chatchai Sasakul, Samson Dutch Boy Gym, Nungdiaw Sakcharuporn, Medgoen Singsurat, Pongsaklek Wonjongkam, Oleydong Sithsamerchai, Kompayak Porpramook, Yodmongkol Vor Saengthep, Wanheng Menayothin, Knockout CP Freshmart, and Saen Sor Ploenchit. The latter joined his stable only briefly after losing his world title. His stable also includes fighters like Palangpol CP Freshmart, Petch CP Freshmart, and Yodgoen Tor Chalermchai.

As of 2015, Virat remained active as a promoter, with his eldest son, Nattadej "Boat" Wachirarattanawong, and his cousin, Piyarat "Tung" Wachirarattanawong, serving as his main assistants.
