= Petch Sor Chitpattana =

Thai boxer (born 1993)

Personal information
- Nickname: Bo (โบ้)
- Nationality: Thai
- Born: Thasana Saraphath (ทัศนะ สารพัฒน์); November 20, 1993 (age 32) Phon Thong, Roi Et, Thailand
- Height: 168.7 cm (5 ft 6 in)
- Weight: Flyweight; Super flyweight; Bantamweight

Boxing career
- Reach: 174 cm (69 in)
- Stance: Southpaw

Boxing record
- Total fights: 84
- Wins: 81
- Win by KO: 54
- Losses: 3
- Draws: 0
- No contests: 0

Petch Sor Chitpattana, also known as Petch CP Freshmart and Petch CPF (Thai: เพชร ส.จิตรพัฒนา, เพชร ซีพีเฟรชมาร์ท, เพชร ซีพีเอฟ; born: November 20, 1993) is a Thai professional boxer in Bantamweight division. Before that, he involved in Muay Thai as Rambo Or Boonchuay (แรมโบ้ อ.บุญช่วย).

Petch debut in 2011, his current manager is Petchyindee Boxing Promotion's Wirat Wachirarattanawong.

On June 23, 2018, he has a program for challenge vacant WBC Bantamweight world title with fellow undefeated Frenchman Nordine Oubaali in Paris. In this time, he has former WBC Flyweight world champion Chatchai Sasakul as a trainer. But this fight was postponed. Ringstar, the organizer claim that because took place during the 2018 World Cup, so afraid that no one will be interested in watching.

Later, WBC assigned him to fight with Japanese Takuma Inoue, who is a younger brother of Naoya Inoue for vacant WBC interim Bantamweight title, both fight at the Ota City General Gymnasium, Tokyo on December 30, 2018, as a result, Petch was defeated for the first time with a unanimous scored 117–111 after 12 rounds.

On October 14, 2024, he had his second chance to fight for the world title against Junto Nakatani the undefeated Japanese WBC Bantamweight champion at Ariake Arena, Tokyo. Before the bout, he was the underdog at 13–1. In the end, he was knocked out in the sixth round after being knocked down twice.

== Professional boxing record ==
79 fights	76 wins	3 losses
By knockout	53	2
By decision	23	1

No.	Result	Record	Opponent	Type	Round, time	Date	Location	Notes
84	Loss	81–3	Yuta Sakai	KO	4 (8), 2:00	29 Oct 2026	Korakuen Hall, Tokyo, Japan	
83	Win	81–2	Noli James Maquilan	UD	10	10 Jun 2026	Rangsit International Stadium, Rangsit, Thailand	Won WBC Silver Asian Bantamweight title
82	Win	80–2	Mark Antonio	TD-U	6 (10)	25 Feb 2026	Nakhon Sawan, Nakhon Sawan Municipality Ground, Thailand	Retained WBC Asian Bantamweight title
81	Win	79–2	Carlo Demecillo	UD	10	29 Oct 2025	Nakhon Sawan, Nakhon Sawan Municipality Ground, Thailand	Retained WBC Asian Bantamweight title
80	Win	78–2	Yanjie Zhang	UD	10	30 Apr 2025	Rangsit International Stadium, Rangsit, Thailand	Won WBC Asian Bantamweight title
79	Win	77–2	Sarawut Worachaisakul	TKO	2 (6)	1 Mar 2025	Thanyaburi, Thai Payak Boxing Gym, Thailand	
78	Loss	76–2	Junto Nakatani	TKO	6 (12), 2:59	14 Oct 2024	Ariake Arena, Tokyo, Japan	For WBC bantamweight title
77	Win	76–1	GuiMing Li	UD	10	31 Jul 2024	Rangsit International Stadium, Rangsit, Thailand	Retained WBC-ABCO bantamweight title
76	Win	75–1	Petchsaming Sakpinyo	TKO	3 (6), 0:27	26 Mar 2024	Rangsit International Stadium, Rangsit, Thailand	
75	Win	74–1	Kittipong Jareonroy	UD	6	22 Nov 2023	Rangsit International Stadium, Rangsit, Thailand	
74	Win	73–1	Phi Vĩnh To	TKO	4 (10), 2:59	6 Sep 2023	Chiang Mai, Chiang Mai Province, Thailand	Retained WBC-ABCO bantamweight title
73	Win	72–1	Thanachai Khamoon	TKO	3 (6), 1:50	19 Jul 2023	Rangsit International Stadium, Rangsit, Thailand	
72	Win	71–1	Chenghao Luo	UD	10	7 Jun 2023	Rangsit International Stadium, Rangsit, Thailand	Retained WBC-ABCO bantamweight title
71	Win	70–1	Renz Rosia	UD	10	22 Mar 2023	Rangsit International Stadium, Rangsit, Thailand	Retained WBC-ABCO bantamweight title
70	Win	69–1	Paul Angalla	UD	10	1 Feb 2023	Rangsit International Stadium, Rangsit, Thailand	
69	Win	68–1	Cris Alfante	TD	8 (10)	12 Oct 2022	Rangsit International Stadium, Rangsit, Thailand	Unanimous TD; Won vacant WBC-ABCO bantamweight title
68	Win	67–1	Thanachai Khamoon	TKO	4 (6), 1:43	31 Aug 2022	SaveOne Market, Nakhon Ratchasima, Thailand	
67	Win	66–1	Mab Chan	TKO	2 (6), 2:30	28 Jun 2022	Rangsit International Stadium, Rangsit, Thailand	
66	Win	65–1	Alvin Medura	UD	10	26 Apr 2022	Rangsit International Stadium, Rangsit, Thailand	Won vacant WBC-ABCO Continental bantamweight title
65	Win	64–1	Petchsamuthr Duanaaymukdahan	TKO	1 (6), 2:15	15 Feb 2022	Rangsit International Stadium, Rangsit, Thailand	
64	Win	63–1	Petchnamnung Sithsaithong	TKO	4 (10), 1:12	28 Dec 2021	Rangsit International Stadium, Rangsit, Thailand	Retained WBC-ABCO Silver bantamweight title
63	Win	62–1	Pone Sithmanopchai	TKO	2 (6), 1:25	23 Nov 2021	Rangsit International Stadium, Rangsit, Thailand	
62	Win	61–1	Detchadin Sornsirisuphathin	UD	6	5 Oct 2021	Chang Arena, Buriram, Thailand	
61	Win	60–1	Chaiwat Buatkrathok	TKO	4 (10), 1:45	3 Apr 2021	Rangsit International Stadium, Rangsit, Thailand	Retained WBC-ABCO Silver bantamweight title
60	Win	59–1	Thiendaeng Manoprungroj	RTD	4 (6), 3:00	6 Mar 2021	Rangsit International Stadium, Rangsit, Thailand	
59	Win	58–1	Theeraphong Changsawang	TKO	3 (6), 1:19	27 Nov 2020	City Hall Ground, Nakhon Sawan, Thailand	
58	Win	57–1	Mostafa Tabtoukhzadeh	TKO	3 (6), 1:24	25 Sep 2020	Rangsit International Stadium, Rangsit, Thailand	
57	Win	56–1	Tongthep Taeyawong	TKO	6 (10), 2:18	28 Aug 2020	Rangsit International Stadium, Ransit, Thailand	Retained WBC-ABCO Silver bantamweight title
56	Win	55–1	George Lumoly	KO	6 (10), 0:27	21 Feb 2020	Sabpayom Market, Ayutthaya, Thailand	Won vacant WBC-ABCO Silver bantamweight title
55	Win	54–1	Hicham Boulahri	TKO	6 (6), 1:27	24 Jan 2020	Siam Paradise Entertainment Centre, Bangkok, Thailand	
54	Win	53–1	Aries Buenavidez	KO	3 (10), 0:49	29 Nov 2019	Sintawee Village, Bangkok, Thailand	Retained OPBF Silver bantamweight title
53	Win	52–1	Dionathã Santos Tobias	TKO	5 (6), 2:03	20 Sep 2019	Siam Paradise Entertainment Centre, Bangkok, Thailand	
52	Win	51–1	Peiman Zolfaghari Khorshidi	KO	6 (6), 2:10	2 Aug 2019	City Hall Ground, Nakhon Sawan, Thailand	
51	Win	50–1	Younes Dehghanamirabadi	TKO	3 (6), 1:59	28 Jun 2019	Siam Paradise Entertainment Centre	
50	Win	49–1	Nicky Jordan Nainggolan	KO	5 (10)	24 Apr 2019	City Hall, Saraburi, Thailand	Won inaugural OPBF Silver bantamweight title
49	Loss	48–1	Takuma Inoue	UD	12	30 Dec 2018	Ota City General Gymnasium, Tokyo, Japan	For vacant WBC interim bantamweight title
48	Win	48–0	Chatri Charoensin	TKO	1 (6), 2:22	21 Sep 2018	Rangsit International Stadium, Rangsit, Thailand	
47	Win	47–0	Manot Comput	TKO	2 (6), 1:29	31 Jul 2018	Thanyaburi, Pathum Thani Province, Thailand	
46	Win	46–0	Espinos Sabu	TKO	2 (8)	6 Mar 2018	Chonburi Provincial Ground, Chonburi, Thailand	
45	Win	45–0	Đồng Dụ Trần	TKO	4 (8), 0:51	26 Jan 2018	Rangsit International Stadium, Rangsit, Thailand	
44	Win	44–0	Samson Elnino	TKO	3 (6), 0:26	25 Nov 2017	Suranaree Camp Stadium, Nakhon Ratchasima, Thailand	
43	Win	43–0	Prayoot Yaijam	KO	2 (6)	29 Sep 2017	Le Meridien Chiang Rai Resort, Chiang Rai, Thailand	
42	Win	42–0	Manoosh Sofini	TKO	1 (6), 2:52	21 Jul 2017	Siam Paradise Entertainment Centre, Bangkok, Thailand	
41	Win	41–0	Aswan Che	TKO	4 (6)	3 Jun 2017	Provincial Stadium, Rayong, Thailand	
40	Win	40–0	Rendi Stone	KO	6 (10), 1:52	17 Feb 2017	Bangna Diatrict Office, Bangkok, Thailand	Retained WBC Youth Silver bantamweight title
39	Win	39–0	Nicky Jordan Nainggolan	KO	6 (10)	30 Dec 2016	Siam Paradise Entertainment Centre, Bangkok, Thailand	Retained WBC Youth Silver bantamweight title
38	Win	38–0	John Rey Lauza	UD	10	26 Aug 2016	Ufoo Trade Center, Khon Kaen, Thailand	Retained WBC Youth Silver bantamweight title
37	Win	37–0	Eugene Lagos	UD	10	27 May 2016	Ayuthaya Night Bazzar, Ayutthaya, Thailand	Retained WBC Youth Silver bantamweight title
36	Win	36–0	Vincent Bautista	RTD	5 (10), 3:00	3 Mar 2016	City Hall Ground, Nakhon Ratchasima, Thailand	Retained WBC Youth Silver bantamweight title
35	Win	35–0	Anusorn Chaisura	TKO	4 (6)	29 Jan 2016	Wing 416, Chiang Rai, Thailand	
34	Win	34–0	Jeson Umbal	UD	10	24 Nov 2015	City Hall Ground, Chonhuri, Thailand	Retained WBC Youth Silver bantamweight title
33	Win	33–0	Eric Panza	UD	10	25 Sep 2015	Provincial Stadium, Nakhon Sawan, Thailand	Retained WBC Youth Silver bantamweight title
32	Win	32–0	Alexis Barateau	KO	4 (6)	24 Jul 2015	Siam Paradise Entertainment Centre, Bangkok, Thailand	
31	Win	31–0	Jayar Estremos	KO	2 (10)	2 Jun 2015	Central Ramintra Resort, Bangkok, Thailand	Retained WBC Youth Silver bantamweight title
30	Win	30–0	Jestoni Autida	UD	10	27 Mar 2015	Chokchai 4 Market, Bangkok, Thailand	Retained WBC Youth Silver bantamweight title
29	Win	29–0	Tinglong Hou	TKO	4 (10), 1:40	30 Jan 2015	Chom Thong District Office, Bangkok, Thailand	Retained WBC Youth Silver bantamweight title
28	Win	28–0	Petchchumphol Sor Visetkit	UD	6	28 Nov 2014	The Society Ayutthaya Resort, Ayutthaya, Thailand	
27	Win	27–0	Rio A Nainggolan	TKO	3 (10)	31 Oct 2014	Asiatique Riverfront, Bangkok, Thailand	Retained WBC Youth Silver bantamweight title
26	Win	26–0	Jaymart Toyco	KO	8 (10)	29 Aug 2014	Siam Society Hotel and Resort, Bangkok, Thailand	Retained WBC Youth Silver bantamweight title
25	Win	25–0	Gerpaul Valero	UD	10	27 Jun 2014	Ayuthaya Night Bazzar, Ayutthaya, Thailand	Retained WBC Youth Silver bantamweight title
24	Win	24–0	Carlo Bavetta	KO	4 (6)	28 Feb 2014	Ramindra Lumpini stadium, Bangkok, Thailand	
23	Win	23–0	Xian Qian Wei	UD	10	27 Dec 2013	Siam Paradise Entertainment Centre, Bangkok, Thailand	Retained WBC Youth Silver bantamweight title
22	Win	22–0	Falazona Fidal	TKO	3 (6)	29 Nov 2013	City Hall Ground, Chonburi, Thailand	
21	Win	21–0	Mokhtar Tarighatranah	TKO	4 (10), 0:45	25 Oct 2013	Ayuthaya Night Bazzar, Ayutthaya, Thailand	Won vacant WBC Silver Youth bantamweight title
20	Win	20–0	Mukesh Kumar	UD	6	27 Sep 2013	Chom Thong District Office, Bangkok, Thailand	
19	Win	19–0	Roman Canto	UD	10	10 Jul 2013	Siam Paradise Entertainment Centre, Bangkok, Thailand	
18	Win	18–0	Wuling Ma	UD	10	8 May 2013	Piboonmangsahan, Ubon Ratchathani, Thailand	
17	Win	17–0	Ekkawit Thongmee	KO	2 (6)	25 Jan 2013	Wat Bannamtieng, Maha Sarakham, Thailand	
16	Win	16–0	Fernando Ocon	UD	10	28 Dec 2012	Chom Thong District Office, Bangkok, Thailand	Retained WBC Youth Silver super flyweight title
15	Win	15–0	Jeffrey Cerna	TKO	5 (10), 2:03	26 Oct 2012	Siam Paradise Entertainment Centre, Bangkok, Thailand	Retained WBC Youth Silver super flyweight title
14	Win	14–0	Gou Wen Dong	TKO	4 (10)	27 Jul 2012	Amphawa District Office, Samut Songkhram, Thailand	
13	Win	13–0	Muhamad Abdrah	PTS	6	22 Jun 2012	Bungkum, Bangkok, Thailand	
12	Win	12–0	Jeffrey Cerna	KO	8 (10)	30 Mar 2012	Chokchai 4 Market, Bangkok, Thailand	Won inaugural WBC Youth Silver super flyweight title
11	Win	11–0	Rodel Quilaton	UD	6	2 Mar 2012	Chonburi, Chonburi Province, Thailand	
10	Win	10–0	Charlie Cabilla	TKO	3 (10), 2:05	27 Jan 2012	Chom Thong District Office, Bangkok, Thailand	Retained WBC Youth flyweight title
9	Win	9–0	Mongkoldam Sithwarunee	KO	4 (6)	23 Dec 2011	11th Inf Reg, Bangkok, Thailand	
8	Win	8–0	Jessie Tuyor	UD	10	25 Nov 2011	Udomsuk 58, Bangkok, Thailand	
7	Win	7–0	Rian Apriles Djabar	TKO	3 (10)	21 Oct 2011	11th Inf Reg, Bangkok, Thailand	Retained WBC Youth flyweight title
6	Win	6–0	Ma Diao	KO	3 (10), 1:42	26 Aug 2011	Chom Thong District Office, Bangkok, Thailand	Won vacant WBC Youth flyweight title
5	Win	5–0	Numphol Kiatpracha	TKO	2 (6), 0:22	29 Jul 2011	Wat Sakae School, Uthai, Thailand	
4	Win	4–0	Anucha Banti	TKO	2 (6), 1:58	24 Jun 2011	Chokchai 4 Market, Bangkok, Thailand	
3	Win	3–0	Ekkawit Thongmee	TKO	2 (6), 1:08	27 May 2011	Nihon Machi, Bangkok, Thailand	
2	Win	2–0	Pongpan Patanakan Gym	TKO	1 (6)	29 Apr 2011	E-sarn University, Khon Kaen, Thailand	
1	Win	1–0	Jomhod Eminentair	TKO	3 (6)	31 Mar 2011	Saraburi, Saraburi Province, Thailand	

== Titles ==
- World Boxing Council (WBC)
  - WBC Youth Flyweight title (2011)
  - WBC Youth Silver Super flyweight title (2012)
  - WBC Youth Silver Bantamweight title (2013)
  - OPBF Silver Bantamweight title (2019)
  - WBC-ABCO Bantamweight title (2020)
  - WBC-ABCO Continental Bantamweight title (2022)
  - WBC-ABCO Bantamweight title (2022)
