= Radoslav Rosenov =

Bulgarian boxer

Personal information
- Nationality: Bulgaria
- Born: 2003 or 2004 (age 21–22)

Boxing career
Medal record
Men's amateur boxing
Representing Bulgaria
World Championships
Bronze medal – third place	2025 Liverpool	60 kg
EUBC European Championships
Silver medal – second place	2024 Belgrade	Lightweight
European Boxing Championships
Gold medal – first place	2026 Sofia	60 kg
European U23 Championships
Gold medal – first place	2024 Sofia	Lightweight

Radoslav Rosenov (born 2003/2004) is a Bulgarian boxer. He competed at the 2024 European Amateur Boxing Championships, winning the silver medal in the lightweight event. He also competed at the 2025 World Boxing Championships, winning the bronze medal in the men's 60 kg event.
