= Yuta Sakai =

Japanese boxer (born 2005)

Yuta Sakai 坂井優太
Personal information
- Born: 27 May 2005 (age 21) Amagasaki, Hyogo, Japan
- Height: 5 ft 8 in (173 cm)
- Weight: Bantamweight

Boxing career
- Reach: 68 1/2 in (174 cm)
- Stance: Southpaw

Boxing record
- Total fights: 9
- Wins: 9
- Win by KO: 8
Medal record
Men's amateur boxing
Representing Japan
Youth World Championships
Gold medal – first place	2022 La Nucia	Bantamweight

Yuta Sakai (坂井優太, Yuuta Sakai; born 27 May 2005) is a Japanese professional boxer. As an amateur, Sakai won a gold medal at the 2022 Youth World Championships.

== Amateur career ==
=== World Youth Championship result ===
La Nuncia 2022

- First round: Defeated Wasim Abusal (Palestine) RSC
- Second Round: Defeated Denys Rozdolskyi (Ukraine) RSC
- Quarter-finals: Defeated Andrey Bonilla (United States) 5–0
- Semi-finals: Defeated Gor Ayvazyan (Georgia) 4–1
- Final: Defeated Ashish (India) 3–2

== Professional career ==
=== Early career ===
On 7 March 2024, it was announced that Sakai would become professional and would be promoted by Ohashi Promotions. His debut was planned for later in 2024. Sakai made his professional debut in a bout against Ji Yong Kim on 25 June 2024. In the opening round, Sakai knocked his opponent down with a right hook. Despite Kim recovering from the knockdown, his corner opted to call an end to the bout in the second round after Sakai landed a number of unanswered punches.

Sakai's second outing as a professional was against Sujaritchon Surampai on 17 October 2024. In the closing moments of the opening round, Sakai connected with a powerful right hand to the body which sent his opponent to the canvas. Surampai was able to recover from the knockdown, but was soon down again early in second round after Sakai landed a straight left hand. Despite Surampai beating the count for a second time, Sakai was declared the winner after the referee decided to call an end to the bout. Sakai's next bout was against Thanyapat Seehanan 25 March 2025. During the opening moments of the bout, Sakai landed a left hand to the body which knocked his opponent down. Sakai secured the win after Seehanan was unable to beat the count.

== Professional boxing record ==
9 fights	9 wins	0 losses
By knockout	8	0
By decision	1	0

No.	Result	Record	Opponent	Type	Round, time	Date	Location	Notes
9	Win	9–0	Petch Sor Chitpattana	KO	4 (8), 2:00	29 Oct 2026	Korakuen Hall, Tokyo, Japan	
8	Win	8–0	Froilan Saludar	TKO	7 (8), 0:47	10 Jun 2026	Korakuen Hall, Tokyo, Japan	
7	Win	7–0	Wesley Caga	UD	8	24 Mar 2026	Korakuen Hall, Tokyo, Japan	
6	Win	6–0	Boonrueang Phayom	TKO	1 (8), 2:10	18 Dec 2025	Korakuen Hall, Tokyo, Japan	
5	Win	5–0	Chunhua Yang	KO	5 (8), 2:47	21 Aug 2025	Korakuen Hall, Tokyo, Japan	
4	Win	4–0	Ryoji Miyashita	TKO	2 (8), 1:43	15 Jun 2025	EDION Arena, Osaka, Japan	Won vacant Japanese Youth bantamweight title
3	Win	3–0	Thanyapat Seehanan	KO	1 (8), 1:51	25 Mar 2025	Korakuen Hall, Tokyo, Japan	
2	Win	2–0	Sujaritchon Surampai	TKO	2 (8), 1:18	17 Oct 2024	Korakuen Hall, Tokyo, Japan	
1	Win	1–0	Ji Yong Kim	TKO	2 (6), 1:20	25 Jun 2024	Korakuen Hall, Tokyo, Japan	

Sporting positions
Regional boxing titles
Vacant Title last held by Shunpei Kaneshiro	Japanese Youth bantamweight champion 15 June 2025 – present	Incumbent
