= Jindřich Janečka =

Czech boxer (born 2004)

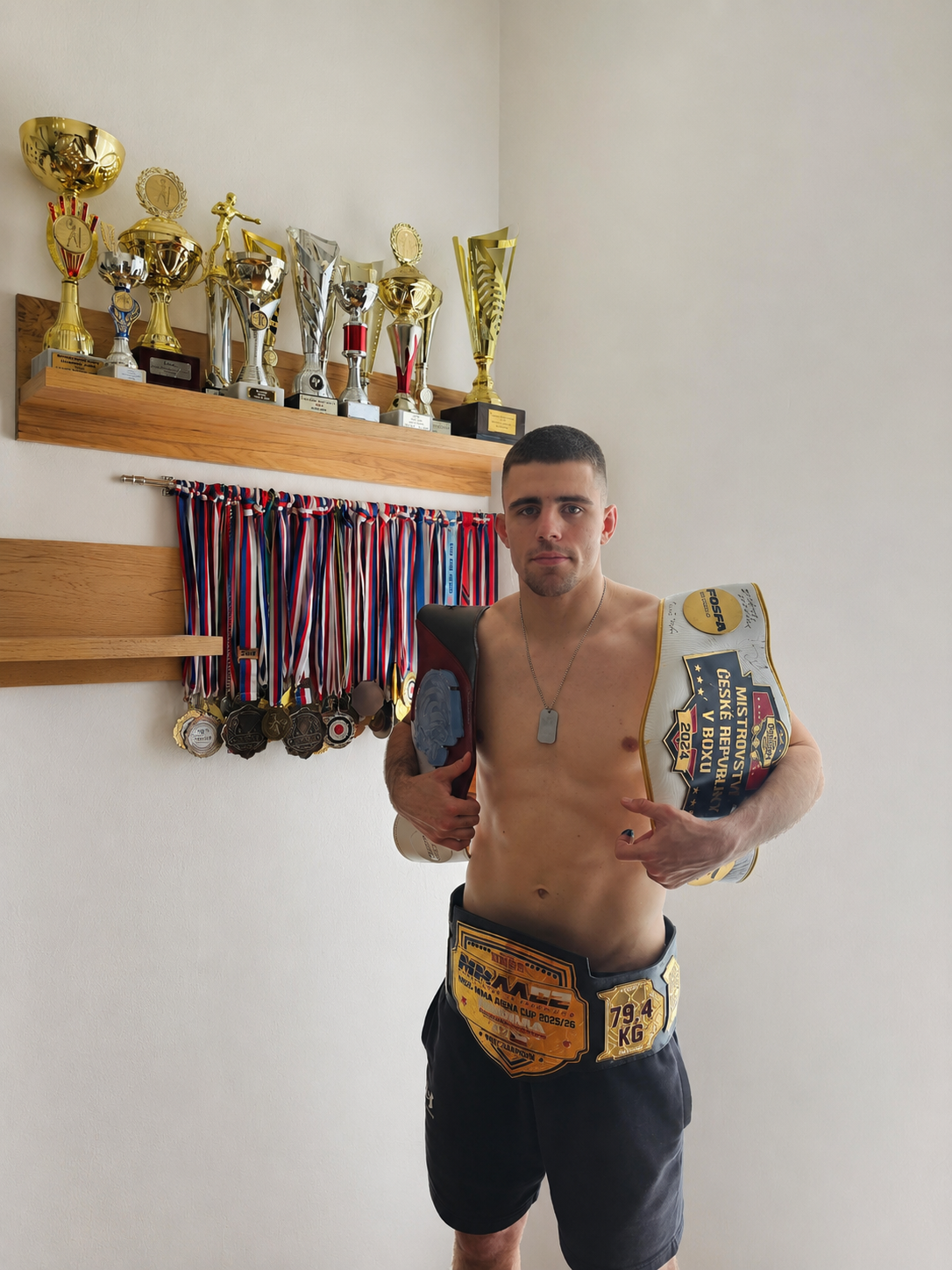
- Jindřich Janečka with the Czech Republic MMA Champion belt in the under 79.4 kg weight class and with the Czech Republic Men's Light Heavyweight Boxing Champion belts (2026)

Personal information
- Nickname: Machine
- Nationality: Czech
- Born: 14 April 2004 (age 22) Brno, Czech Republic
- Height: 6.19 ft (189 cm)
- Weight: 176 lb (80 kg)

Boxing career
- Weight class: Heavyweight

Boxing record
- Wins: 52
- Losses: 12
Medal record
Men's amateur MMA
Gold medal – first place	CZE Championship of men 2026	79.4 kg
Men's amateur boxing
Representing Czech Republic
Gold medal – first place	CZE Championship of men 2023	80 kg
Gold medal – first place	CZE Championship of men 2024	80 kg
Gold medal – first place	2021 Internacional IBA Tournament	75 kg
Silver medal – second place	2022 European IBA Tournament	80 kg
Silver medal – second place	2022 European IBA Tournament	80 kg
Bronze medal – third place	2024 Internacional IBA Tournament	80 kg
Gold medal – first place	2024 Internacional IBA Tournament	80 kg

Jindřich Janečka (Czech: [ˈjɪndr̝ɪx ˈjanɛtʃka]; born 14 April 2004) is a Czech boxer and mixed martial artist. In boxing, he has won six Czech Republic national titles in various age categories and has represented the Czech Republic in international competitions. In 2026, he became the Czech Republic champion in amateur MMA.

== Life ==
Jindřich Janečka is originally from Brno and has been involved in combat sports since childhood. In 2016, in school boys category he won the title champion of the Czech Republic in judo.

In the same year, he started boxing at the boxing club Kometa Brno under Vit Kral, who later became his head coach. In national tournament in boxing, he also fought for Boxing club Ostrava.

In 2023, he became the face of the first CUPRA Garage in the Czech Republic.

After graduating from the grammar school in Brno on Vídeňská Street, he studied at the Faculty of Civil Engineering of the Brno University of Technology.

== Sports career ==
- 2018
  - Champion of the Czech Republic, school youth, 62 kilograms (136.69 pounds) category, RSC victory (victory by ending the match by ringside referee).
- 2020
  - Champion of the Czech Republic, boys, 75 kilograms (165.35 pounds) category, victory by opponent gave up.
  - 5th place at the European boys Championship.
  - Winner of the Olympic Hopes Tournament.
- 2021
  - Champion of the Czech Republic, youth, 75 kilograms (165.35 pounds) category, won on points 5–0.
  - Winner at the IBA Maribor Cup international tournament.
  - Participant in the European youth Championships.
- 2022
  - Champion of the Czech Republic, youth, 80 kilograms (176.37 pounds) category, RSC victory.
  - Participant in the European youth Championships.
  - 2nd place at the European IBA Tournament Danas Pozniakas.
  - 2nd place at the European IBA Tournament Memorial of Július Torma.
- 2023
  - Champion of the Czech Republic, men, 80 kilograms (176.37 pounds) category, wins on points.
  - At the FOSFA Real Boxing Cup tournament in Budapest, he defeated seven-time Austrian champion Marcel Meinl by KO in the first round.
  - Participant of the 2023 European Games in Kraków after nomination by the Czech Olympic Committee.
- 2024
  - bronze medal from the 54th International Grand Prix tournament of the city of Ústí nad Labem 2024, where he lost to the Chinese representative 2023 world vice-champion and 2022 Asian Games winner Tuohetaerbieke Tanglatihan.
  - Champion of the Czech Republic, men, 80 kilograms (176.37 pounds) category, wins on points.
  - Winner at the IBA international tournament Golden Gloves of Vistula.

=== Professional boxing ===
As of 2026, he has a professional boxing record of 5 wins and no losses.

=== MMAA (Mixed Martial Arts Amateurs) ===
In 2025, he started competing in MMA for the club MMA Liberec. In June 2026, he became the Czech Republic champion in amateur MMA, when he defeated his opponent Jiří Peřina by KO in the first round of the final bout held in Chomutov.

== Other ==
Jindřich Janečka played a central role in the clip of the rapper ICKO in the song JAB, JAB, which was released on May 15, 2023. At the end of the song (2:44), he poses with all his medals. The clip was placed in the TOP charts and has 68,000 views on YouTube.
