= Tomislav Đinović =

Montenegrin boxer

Personal information
- Nationality: Montenegro

Boxing career
Medal record
Men's amateur boxing
Representing Montenegro
European Championships
Bronze medal – third place	2024 Belgrade	Lightweight
European U23 Championships
Bronze medal – third place	2024 Sofia	Lightweight

Tomislav Đinović is a Montenegrin boxer. He competed at the 2024 European Amateur Boxing Championships, winning the bronze medal in the lightweight event.
