= European Boxing Championships =

Boxing competitions

- Status: Active
- Genre: Sports event
- Date: Midyear
- Frequency: Annual
- Inaugurated: 2026 Sofia
- Next event: 2026 Sofia
- Organiser: European Boxing, World Boxing

The European Boxing Championships, also known as the European Elite Boxing Championships, is the highest competition for amateur or 'Olympic-style' boxing in Europe for both men and women, organised by the continent's World Boxing-affiliated governing body European Boxing. The first edition of the tournament takes place in September 2026 in Sofia. It is a separate competition from both the EUBC-organised European Amateur Boxing Championships, which are affiliated to the International Boxing Association, and the European Union Amateur Boxing Championships.

== Background ==
In 2023, the International Olympic Committee (IOC) expelled the IBA, due to concerns related to corruption, financial transparency, and possible ties to the Russian government. To protect the continued inclusion of boxing in the Olympic movement, a new governing body, World Boxing was formed by critics of the IBA, and this body eventually received Olympic recognition.

On 24 March 2025, European Boxing, the proposed continental federation of World Boxing, held its inaugural Congress in Prague, where Lars Brovil from the Danish Boxing Association was elected president. The first elite championships to be held by the new organisation were set for Sofia, Bulgaria in 2026.

== Editions ==
Edition	Year	Dates	Venue	Events	Participants	Nations
1	2026	17-25 September 20226	Sofia, Bulgaria	20	341	43

== See also ==
- World Boxing affiliated
  - World Boxing Championships
  - Boxing at the Summer Olympics
- IBA affiliated
  - European Amateur Boxing Championships
- Other
  - European Union Amateur Boxing Championships
  - Boxing at the 2015 European Games
  - Boxing at the 2019 European Games
