= Guyana at the 2023 Pan American Games =

- IOC code: GUY
- NOC: Guyana Olympic Association

in Santiago, Chile 20 October 2023 – 5 November 2023
- Competitors: 19 in 8 sports
- Flag bearers (opening): Desmond Amsterdam & Priyanna Ramdhani
- Flag bearer (closing): Leslain Baird
- Medals Ranked =25th: Gold 0 Silver 1 Bronze 2 Total 3

Pan American Games appearances (overview)
- 1959; 1963; 1967; 1971; 1975; 1979; 1983; 1987; 1991; 1995; 1999; 2003; 2007; 2011; 2015; 2019; 2023

Guyana is scheduled to compete at the 2023 Pan American Games in Santiago, Chile from October 20 to November 5, 2023. This will be Guyana's 17th appearance at the Pan American Games, having competed at every edition of the games since the third edition in 1959.

On October 14, a final team of 19 athletes competing in eight sports was announced by the Guyana Olympic Association.^{[a]} Boxer Desmond Amsterdam and badminton athlete Priyanna Ramdhani were the country's flagbearers during the opening ceremony. Meanwhile, javelin thrower Leslain Baird was the country's flagbearer during the closing ceremony.

== Competitors ==
The following is the list of the number of competitors (per gender) participating at the games per sport/discipline.

Sport	Men	Women	Total
Archery	1	0	1
Athletics	2	3	5
Badminton	0	1	1
Boxing	4	1	5
Swimming	1	1	2
Table tennis	1	1	2
Taekwondo	0	1	1
Weightlifting	1	1	2
Total	10	9	19

== Medallists ==
The following Guyanese competitors won medals at the games. In the discipline sections below, the medalists' names are bolded.

Medal	Name	Sport	Event	Date
Silver	Jasmine Abrams	Athletics	Women's 100 metres	October 31
Bronze	Emanuel Archibald	Athletics	Men's 100 metres	October 31
Bronze	Leslain Baird	Athletics	Men's javelin throw	November 4

== Archery ==
Guyana qualified one archer during the 2023 Copa Merengue. This will mark the country's Pan American Games debut in the sport.

Men

Athlete	Event	Ranking Round		Round of 32	Round of 16	Quarterfinals	Semifinals	Final / BM	Rank
Athlete	Event	Score	Seed	Opposition Score	Opposition Score	Opposition Score	Opposition Score	Opposition Score	Rank
Devin Permaul	Individual recurve	611	29	Enríquez (COL); **L** 0–6	Did not advance				

== Athletics ==
Guyana qualified five track and field athletes (two men and three women).

Key

- Note–Ranks given for track events are for the entire round
- **Q** = Qualified for the next round
- **q** = Qualified for the next round as a fastest loser or, in field events, by position without achieving the qualifying target
- **NR** = National record
- **GR** = Games record
- **PB** = Personal best
- NM = No mark
- N/A = Round not applicable for the event
- Bye = Athlete not required to compete in round

Track events

Athlete	Event	Semifinals		Final	
Athlete	Event	Result	Rank	Result	Rank
**Emanuel Archibald**	Men's 100 m	10.35	3 **q**	10.31	3rd place, bronze medalist(s)
**Emanuel Archibald**	Men's 200 m	21.08	5 **q**	21.38	8
**Jasmine Abrams**	Women's 100 m	11.60	2 **Q**	11.52	2nd place, silver medalist(s)
Keliza Smith	Women's 100 m	11.78	14	Did not advance	
Aliyah Abrams	Women's 400 m	51.82	2 **Q**	52.66	5

Field event

Athlete	Event	Final	
Athlete	Event	Distance	Position
**Leslain Baird**	Men's javelin throw	78.23	3rd place, bronze medalist(s)

== Badminton ==
Guyana qualified one female athlete.

Women

Athlete	Event	First round	Second round	Third round	Quarterfinals	Semifinals	Final / BM	
Athlete	Event	Opposition Result	Opposition Result	Opposition Result	Opposition Result	Opposition Result	Opposition Result	Rank
Priyanna Ramdhani	Singles	Bye	Vieira (BRA); **L** 6–21, 0–11^{RET}	Did not advance				

== Boxing ==
Guyana qualified two male boxers, both of whom qualified through the final Pan American Games qualifier held in Cali, Colombia. The boxing event was an open entry event, which allowed Guyana to enter a further two male and one female boxers.

Athlete	Event	Round of 32	Round of 16	Quarterfinals	Semifinals	Final	
Athlete	Event	Opposition Result	Opposition Result	Opposition Result	Opposition Result	Opposition Result	Rank
Keevin Allicock	Men's 57 kg	—N/a	Ibarguen (PAN); **W** RSC R2	Harvey (USA); **L** 0–5	Did not advance		
Joel Williamson	Men's –63.5 kg	Bye	de la Cruz (DOM); **L** 0–5	Did not advance			
Desmond Amsterdam	Men's 80 kg	—N/a	Buonarrigo (ARG); **L** 0–5	Did not advance			
Emmanuel Pompey	Men's 92 kg	—N/a	Aska (ANT); **L**1–4	Did not advance			
Alesha Jackman	Women's 66 kg	—N/a	Pérez (ARG); **L** RSC R3	Did not advance			

== Swimming ==
Guyana qualified two swimmers (one per gender).

Men

- Raekwon Noel

Women

- Aleka Persaud

== Table tennis ==
Guyana qualified one male table tennis athlete at the final qualification tournament in Lima, Peru. Guyana would be later awarded a wildcard in the women's singles event, bringing the team size up to two athletes (one per gender).

Athlete	Event	Round of 32	Round of 16	Quarterfinal	Semifinal	Final / BM	
Athlete	Event	Opposition Result	Opposition Result	Opposition Result	Opposition Result	Opposition Result	Rank
Shemar Britton	Men's singles	Campos (CUB); **L** 1–4 (4–11, 8–11, 8–11, 11–6, 3–11)	Did not advance				
Chelsea Edghill	Women's singles	Silva (MEX); **L** 0–4 (4–11, 6–11, 4–11, 8–11)	Did not advance				
Shemar Britton; Chelsea Edghill	Mixed doubles	Enriquez / Gatica (EAI); **L** 1–4 (8–11, 7–11, 8–11, 11–7, 8–11)	Did not advance				

== Taekwondo ==
Guyana qualified one female athlete during the Pan American Games Qualification Tournament.

Kyorugi

Women

Athlete	Event	Round of 16	Quarterfinals	Semifinals	Repechage	Final/ BM	
Athlete	Event	Opposition Result	Opposition Result	Opposition Result	Opposition Result	Opposition Result	Rank
Ceili Peterson	–49 kg	Sancho (CRC); **L** 1–2	Did not advance				

== Weightlifting ==
Guyana was awarded a wildcard to send one male weightlifter. Guyana later received an additional quota for a women's weightlifter, meaning the team size was two athletes (one man and one woman).

Athlete	Event	Snatch		Clean & Jerk		Total	Rank
Athlete	Event	Result	Rank	Result	Rank	Total	Rank
Shammah Noel	Men's 89 kg	100	14	145	14	245	14
Krystol Chanderban	Women's 59 kg	65	16	78	15	143	15

== Demonstration sports ==
=== Esports ===
Guyana qualified one female athlete. This athlete is not included in the total, because esports is a demonstration sport.

Women

- Hemchandra Persaud

== See also ==
- Guyana at the 2023 Parapan American Games
- Guyana at the 2024 Summer Olympics
