= 2023 IBA World Boxing Championships – Featherweight =

Featherweight at the 2023 IBA World Boxing Championships
- Venue: Humo Arena
- Location: Tashkent, Uzbekistan
- Dates: 1–14 May 2023
- Competitors: 53 from 53 nations

Medalists
gold medal	Abdumalik Khalokov	Uzbekistan
silver medal	Saidel Horta	Cuba
bronze medal	Mohammad Hussamuddin	India
bronze medal	Munarbek Seitbek Uulu	Kyrgyzstan

The featherweight competition at the 2023 IBA Men's World Boxing Championships was held between 1 and 14 May 2023.

== Results ==
=== Finals ===
Semifinals
(Cuba) Saidel Horta	w/o
(India) Mohammad Hussamuddin
(Uzbekistan) Abdumalik Khalokov	RSC-I
(Kyrgyzstan) Munarbek Seitbek Uulu

Final
(Cuba) Saidel Horta	0
(Uzbekistan) Abdumalik Khalokov	5

=== Top half ===
==== Section 1 ====
Round of 64
(Moldova) Ilie Argatu	0
(Mali) Abdoul-Karim Bathily	3
(Nigeria) Wahab Kukoyi	0
(Ecuador) Jean Caicedo	5
(Hungary) Roland Veres	5
(Indonesia) Yosua Holy Masihor	0
(Belarus) Maksim Pankou	0
(Cuba) Saidel Horta	5
(Dominican Republic) José Luis de los Santos	RSC
(Zimbabwe) Wisdom Dube

Round of 32
(Kazakhstan) Serik Temirzhanov	5
(Mali) Abdoul-Karim Bathily	0
(Ecuador) Jean Caicedo	1
(Hungary) Roland Veres	4
(Trinidad and Tobago) Anthony Joseph	0
(Cuba) Saidel Horta	5
(Dominican Republic) José Luis de los Santos	5
(Algeria) Hichem Maouche	0

Round of 16
(Kazakhstan) Serik Temirzhanov	5
(Hungary) Roland Veres	0
(Cuba) Saidel Horta	4
(Dominican Republic) José Luis de los Santos	3

Quarterfinals
(Kazakhstan) Serik Temirzhanov	0
(Cuba) Saidel Horta	5

==== Section 2 ====
Round of 64
(Palestine) Wasim Abusal	0
(Guatemala) Juan Reyes	5
(Turkey) Batuhan Çiftçi	4
(Mongolia) Kharkhüügiin Enkh-Amar	1
(Azerbaijan) Umid Rustamov	5
(Morocco) Soulaimane Samghouli	0
(China) Lyu Ping	5
(South Africa) Amzolele Dyeyi	0
(India) Mohammad Hussamuddin	5
(North Macedonia) Alen Rustemovski	0
(United Arab Emirates) Nawaf Al-Zahmi	1
(El Salvador) Marvin Hernández	4

Round of 32
(Bulgaria) Javier Ibáñez	5
(Guatemala) Juan Reyes	0
(Turkey) Batuhan Çiftçi	2
(Azerbaijan) Umid Rustamov	5
(China) Lyu Ping	0
(India) Mohammad Hussamuddin	5
(El Salvador) Marvin Hernández
(Russia) Eduard Savvin	KO

Round of 16
(Bulgaria) Javier Ibáñez	3
(Azerbaijan) Umid Rustamov	1
(India) Mohammad Hussamuddin	5
(Russia) Eduard Savvin	0

Quarterfinals
(Bulgaria) Javier Ibáñez	3
(India) Mohammad Hussamuddin	4

=== Bottom half ===
==== Section 3 ====
Round of 64
(Iran) Pouria Abdolmaleki	5
(Botswana) Kagoetsile Raokgwathile	0
(Jordan) Yousef Iashash	5
(Japan) Shudai Harada	0
(Albania) Ani Haxhillari	w/o
(Eswatini) Thabiso Dlamini
(Hong Kong) Rex Tso	0
(Chinese Taipei) Lee Cheng-wei	5
(Guyana) Keevin Allicock	5
(Turkmenistan) Yhlas Gylyçjanow	0

Round of 32
(Armenia) Artur Bazeyan	5
(Iran) Pouria Abdolmaleki	0
(Jordan) Yousef Iashash	5
(Albania) Ani Haxhillari	0
(Australia) Charlie Senior	5
(Chinese Taipei) Lee Cheng-wei	0
(Guyana) Keevin Allicock	0
(Uzbekistan) Abdumalik Khalokov	5

Round of 16
(Armenia) Artur Bazeyan	1
(Jordan) Yousef Iashash	4
(Australia) Charlie Senior	0
(Uzbekistan) Abdumalik Khalokov	5

Quarterfinals
(Jordan) Yousef Iashash	0
(Uzbekistan) Abdumalik Khalokov	5

==== Section 4 ====
Round of 64
(Fiji) Mikaele Ravalaca	0
(Spain) Samuel Carmona	5
(Tajikistan) Asror Vohidov	5
(South Korea) Lee Ye-chan	0
(Kyrgyzstan) Munarbek Seitbek Uulu	5
(Puerto Rico) Caleb Tirado	0
(Ghana) Abraham Mensah	0
(Thailand) Sarawut Sukthet	5
(Italy) Michele Baldassi	4
(France) Riad Labidi	3

Round of 32
(Brazil) Luiz Gabriel Oliveira	5
(Spain) Samuel Carmona	0
(Tajikistan) Asror Vohidov	5
(Mozambique) Armando Sigauque	0
(Kyrgyzstan) Munarbek Seitbek Uulu	RSC
(Thailand) Sarawut Sukthet
(Italy) Michele Baldassi	0
(Mexico) Miguel Vega	5

Round of 16
(Brazil) Luiz Gabriel Oliveira	3
(Tajikistan) Asror Vohidov	4
(Kyrgyzstan) Munarbek Seitbek Uulu	4
(Mexico) Miguel Vega	1

Quarterfinals
(Tajikistan) Asror Vohidov	1
(Kyrgyzstan) Munarbek Seitbek Uulu	4
