= Guyana at the 2011 Pan American Games =

- IOC code: GUY
- NOC: Guyana Olympic Association
- Website: www.olympic.org/guyana

in Guadalajara 14–30 October 2011
- Competitors: 19 in 5 sports
- Flag bearer: David Rajjab
- Medals Ranked 27th: Gold 0 Silver 0 Bronze 1 Total 1

Pan American Games appearances (overview)
- 1959; 1963; 1967; 1971; 1975; 1979; 1983; 1987; 1991; 1995; 1999; 2003; 2007; 2011; 2015; 2019; 2023

Guyana competed at the 2011 Pan American Games in Guadalajara, Mexico from October 14 to 30, 2011. Guyana sent 19 athletes in five sports.

== Medalists ==
Medal	Name	Sport	Event	Date
Bronze	Nicolette Fernandes	Squash	Women's singles	October 17

== Athletics ==
Guyana has qualified a team of three athletes.

=== Track and road events ===
Event	Athletes	Heats		Semifinal		Final	
Event	Athletes	Time	Rank	Time	Rank	Time	Rank
100 m	Adam Harris	10.62	5th	Did not advance			
100 m	Lee Prowell	10.65	5th	Did not advance			
200 m	Adam Harris	22.45	6th	Did not advance			
200 m	Winston George	24.17	7th	Did not advance			
400 m	Winston George			46.93	4th	Did not advance	

== Rugby sevens ==
Guyana has qualified a rugby sevens team. It will consist of 12 athletes.

Roster

- Vallon Adams
- Claudius Butts
- Avery Corbin
- Rupert Giles
- Ryan Gonsalves
- Dominic Lespiree
- Ronald Mayers
- Kevin McKenzie
- Richard Staglon
- Breon Walks
- George Walter
- Leon Greaves

Group A

Team	Pld	W	D	L	PF	PA	PD	Pts
Argentina	3	3	0	0	92	15	+77	12
Uruguay	3	2	0	1	52	26	+26	9
Guyana	3	1	0	2	12	65	−53	6
Mexico	3	0	0	3	10	60	−50	3

October 29, 2011
12:15

Uruguay	20 – 0	Guyana
	Report

Tlaquepaque Stadium, Guadalajara

October 29, 2011
14:00

Argentina	40 – 0	Guyana
	Report

Tlaquepaque Stadium, Guadalajara

October 29, 2011
16:30

Guyana	12 – 5	Mexico
	Report

Tlaquepaque Stadium, Guadalajara

=== Quarterfinals ===
October 30, 2011
9:50

Guyana	12 – 24	United States
Tries:McKenzie, Gonsalves; Cons:Gonsalves (1/2)	Report	Tries:Scully, Niua (2), Mauer; Cons:Niua (2/4)

Tlaquepaque Stadium, Guadalajara

=== Fifth to Eighth place ===
October 30, 2011
11:35

Guyana	7 – 14	Mexico
	Report

Tlaquepaque Stadium, Guadalajara

=== Seventh place match ===
October 30, 2011
13:30

Brazil	26 – 7	Guyana
	Report

Tlaquepaque Stadium, Guadalajara

== Squash ==
Guyana has qualified one squash athlete.

Women

Event	Athlete(s)	First round	Round of 16	Quarterfinal	Semifinal	Final
Event	Athlete(s)	Opposition Result	Opposition Result	Opposition Result	Opposition Result	Opposition Result
Nicolette Fernandes	Singles		Antonella Falcione (ARG); W 11-8, 11-6, 11-7	Thaisa Serafini (BRA); W 11-9, 11-9, 11-9	Samantha Terán (MEX); L 3-11, 5-11, 3-11 (bronze)	Did not advance

== Swimming ==
Guyana will send two swimmers who have received wildcards. The team was announced on September 15.

Men

Event	Athletes	Heats		Final	
Event	Athletes	Time	Position	Time	Position
50 m Freestyle	Niall Roberts	DNS		Did not advance	
100 m Freestyle	Niall Roberts	55.45	23rd	Did not advance	
100 m Butterfly	Niall Roberts	DNS		Did not advance	

Women

Event	Athletes	Heats		Final	
Event	Athletes	Time	Position	Time	Position
100m freestyle	Britany van Lange	1:02.28	19th	Did not advance	
200m freestyle	Britany van Lange	2:20.21	14th qB	DNS	
400 m freestyle	Britany van Lange	4:57.58	17th	Did not advance	

== Taekwondo ==
Guyana has qualified one taekwondo athlete.

Men

Athlete	Event	Round of 16	Quarterfinals	Semifinals	Final
Athlete	Event	Opposition Result	Opposition Result	Opposition Result	Opposition Result
David Rajjab	+80 kg	Keneth Edwards (JAM); L 6 - 12	Did not advance		
