= Guyana at the 2019 Pan American Games =

- IOC code: GUY
- NOC: Guyana Olympic Association

in Lima, Peru 26 July–11 August, 2019
- Competitors: 26 in 8 sports
- Flag bearer: Keevin Allicock (opening)
- Medals: Gold 0 Silver 0 Bronze 0 Total 0

Pan American Games appearances (overview)
- 1959; 1963; 1967; 1971; 1975; 1979; 1983; 1987; 1991; 1995; 1999; 2003; 2007; 2011; 2015; 2019; 2023

Guyana competed at the 2019 Pan American Games in Lima, Peru from July 26 to August 11, 2019.

On July 14, 2019 the Guyana Olympic Association announced the full team of 26 athletes (17 men and nine women) competing in eight sports.

During the opening ceremony of the games, boxer Keevin Allicock carried the flag of the country as part of the parade of nations.

== Competitors ==
The following is the list of number of competitors (per gender) participating at the games per sport/discipline.

Sport	Men	Women	Total
Athletics (track and field)	1	3	4
Boxing	1	0	1
Badminton	1	1	2
Rugby sevens	12	0	12
Squash	0	3	3
Swimming	1	1	2
Table tennis	0	1	1
Taekwondo	1	0	1
Total	17	9	26

== Athletics (track and field) ==
Guyana qualified four athletes (one man and three women).

Key

- Note–Ranks given for track events are for the entire round
- q = Qualified for the next round as a fastest loser or, in field events, by position without achieving the qualifying target
- DNF = Did not finish

Track events

Athlete	Event	Semifinals		Final	
Athlete	Event	Result	Rank	Result	Rank
Emanuel Archibald	Men's 100 m	10.62	20	did not advance	
Brenessa Thompson	Women's 100 m	11.96	17	did not advance	
Brenessa Thompson	Women's 200 m	24.20	18	did not advance	
Aliyah Abrams	Women's 400 m	52.95	8 q	52.63	7
Jenea McCammon	100 m hurdles	DNF		did not advance	

Field event

Athlete	Event	Final	
Athlete	Event	Distance	Position
Emanuel Archibald	Men's long jump	7.22	11

== Badminton ==
Guyana qualified a team of two badminton athletes (one per gender).

Athlete	Event	Round of 64	Round of 32	Round of 16	Quarterfinals	Semifinals	Final	Rank
Athlete	Event	Opposition Result	Opposition Result	Opposition Result	Opposition Result	Opposition Result	Opposition Result	Rank
Narayan Ramdhani	Men's singles	Bye	Ricketts (JAM); L 0–2 (13–21, 23–25)	did not advance				
Priyanna Ramdhani	Women's singles	Bye	Villalobos (CRC); L 0–2 (8–21, 14–21)	did not advance				
Narayan Ramdhani; Priyanna Ramdhani	Mixed doubles	—N/a	Palacio / Rodriguez (CUB); L 0–2 (20–22, 11–21)	did not advance				

== Boxing ==
Guyana qualified one male boxer.

Men

Athlete	Event	Quarterfinals	Semifinals	Final	Rank
Athlete	Event	Opposition Result	Opposition Result	Opposition Result	Rank
Keevin Allicock	56 kg	Fernández (URU); L 2–3	did not advance		

== Rugby sevens ==
Guyana qualified a men's team of 12 athletes, by finishing as runner ups at the 2018 RAN Sevens.

=== Men's tournament ===
Roster

Guyana's roster of 12 athletes was officially named on July 14, 2019.

- Vallon Adams
- Lancelot Adonis
- Jamal Angus
- Godfrey Broomes
- Claudius Butts
- Avery Corbin
- Selwyn Henry
- Patrick King
- Ronald Mayers
- Ozie McKenzie
- Dwayne Schroeder
- Richard Staglon
- Peabo Hamilton

Pool stage

Pos	Team	Pld	W	D	L	PF	PA	PD	Pts	Qualification
1	Brazil	3	2	1	0	85	24	+61	8	Semifinals
2	United States	3	2	0	1	92	19	+73	7	Semifinals
3	Chile	3	1	1	1	108	41	+67	6	5–8th place semifinals
4	Guyana	3	0	0	3	7	208	−201	3	5–8th place semifinals

Source: Lima 2019
Rules for classification: 1) Points; 2) Head-to-head result; 3) Point difference; 4) Points scored; 5) draw.

26 July 2019
11:55

United States	62–0	Guyana
Try: Melphy 0'c Noble 2'c Brown (3) 4'm, 9'm, 11'c Wheeler 5'm Tupuola 7'c Lachina 8'c Broselle (2) 10'm, 14'c Con: Melphy (4/6) 1', 2', 7', 8'; Fuala'au (2/4) 12', 14'	Report

Villa María del Triunfo Sports Center
Referee: Nehuen Jauri Rivero (Argentina)

27 July 2019
11:50

Brazil	59–0	Guyana
Try: da Silva (2) 0'm, 5'c F. Sancery 2'c Giantorno 3'm Tenório 7'c Bourda-Couhet 7'c Reeves 9'c Massari 11'c Tranquez 13'c Con: Duque (2/4) 2', 5'; Giantorno (1/1) 7'; Reeves (4/4) 7', 9', 12', 14'	Report

Villa María del Triunfo Sports Center
Referee: Dale Hall (Canada)

27 July 2019
15:40

Chile	87–7	Guyana
Try: Urroz 0'c Brangier (3) 1'c, 11'c, 12'c Silva (4) 2'c, 6'c, 7'm, 7'c Fe. Neira 5'c Fernández 8'c Blanc (2) 9'c, 13'm Tredinick 10'c Con: Urroz (4/5) 0', 1', 6', 8'; Fernández (7/8) 3', 5', 9', 9', 11', 11', 12'	Report	Try: Angus 14'c Con: Broomes (1/1) 14'

Villa María del Triunfo Sports Center
Referee: Cisco Lopez (United States)

5th-8th classification

28 July 2019
10:25

Jamaica	33–19	Guyana
Try: Caton-Brown 2'c Caven 3'c Facey (2) 4'c, 8'c Osborne 10'm Con: Adamson (4/5) 2', 3', 4', 8'	Report	Try: King (2) 11'c, 14'c Schroeder 12'm Con: Broomes (2/3) 11', 14'

Villa María del Triunfo Sports Center
Referee: Cisco Lopez (United States)

Seventh place match

28 July 2019
13:50

Uruguay	24–0	Guyana
Try: Plottier 2'c Ubilla 7'c Brazionis 9'm Viñals 12'm Con: Ubilla (2/3) 3', 7'; Brazionis (0/1)

Villa María del Triunfo Sports Center
Referee: Cisco Lopez (United States)

== Squash ==
Guyana qualified a women's team of three athletes. The team was officially named on July 14, 2019.

Women
Singles and Doubles

Athlete	Event	Round of 16	Quarterfinals	Semifinals	Final	
Athlete	Event	Opposition Result	Opposition Result	Opposition Result	Opposition Result	Rank
Mary Fung-A-Fat	Singles	Pinto (CHI); L 1–3 (7–11, 4–11, 11–7, 10–12)	did not advance			
Ashley Khalil	Singles	Delgado (CHI); L 1–3 (8–11, 12–14, 11–7, 3–11)	did not advance			
Ashley Khalil; Taylor Fernandes	Doubles	—N/a	Delgado (CHI); Pinto (CHI); L 1–2 (4–11, 11–8, 5–11)	did not advance		

Team

Athlete	Event	Group Stage				Quarterfinals	5 to 8 round	6th place match	
Athlete	Event	Opposition Result	Opposition Result	Opposition Result	Rank	Opposition Result	Opposition Result	Opposition Result	Rank
Mary Fung-A-Fat; Ashley Khalil; Taylor Fernandes	Team	Colombia; L 0–3	Peru; W 3–0	Canada; L 0–3	3 Q	Mexico; L 0–2	Peru; W 3–0	Argentina; L 0–2	6

== Swimming ==
Guyana received two universality spots in swimming to enter one man and one woman.

Key

- Note – Ranks given are for the entire round

Athlete	Event	Heat		Final	
Athlete	Event	Time	Rank	Time	Rank
Daniel Scott	Men's 100 m freestyle	56.94	28	did not advance	
Daniel Scott	Men's 200 m freestyle	2:03.77	21	did not advance	
Daniel Scott	Men's 400 m freestyle	4:28.29	18	did not advance	
Nikita Fiedtkou	Women's 50 m freestyle	29.24	27	did not advance	
Nikita Fiedtkou	Women's 100 m freestyle	1:06.07	28	did not advance	

== Table tennis ==
Guyana qualified one female table tennis athlete.

Women

Athlete	Event	Round of 32	Round of 16	Quarterfinals	Semifinals	Final	Rank
Athlete	Event	Opposition Result	Opposition Result	Opposition Result	Opposition Result	Opposition Result	Rank
Chelsea Edghill	Singles	Medina (COL); L 0–4	did not advance				

== Taekwondo ==
Guyana received one wildcard in the men's 68 kg event.

Kyorugi
Men

Athlete	Event	Round of 16	Quarterfinals	Semifinals	Repechage	Final / BM	Rank
Athlete	Event	Opposition Result	Opposition Result	Opposition Result	Opposition Result	Opposition Result	Rank
Justin Choy	-68 kg	Nkogho-Mengue (CAN); L 4–24	did not advance				

== See also ==
- Guyana at the 2020 Summer Olympics
