= Guyana at the 2007 Pan American Games =

- IOC code: GUY
- NOC: Guyana Olympic Association

in Rio de Janeiro 13–29 July 2007
- Competitors: 8 in 3 sports
- Flag bearer: Cleveland Forde
- Medals Ranked 25th: Gold 0 Silver 0 Bronze 1 Total 1

Pan American Games appearances (overview)
- 1959; 1963; 1967; 1971; 1975; 1979; 1983; 1987; 1991; 1995; 1999; 2003; 2007; 2011; 2015; 2019; 2023

The 15th Pan American Games were held in Rio de Janeiro, Brazil from 13 July 2007 to 29 July 2007.

== Medal summary ==
=== Medal table ===
Medal	Name	Sport	Event	Date
Bronze	Clive Atwell	Boxing	−54 kg	24 July

Medals by sport
Sport	1st place, gold medalist(s)	2nd place, silver medalist(s)	3rd place, bronze medalist(s)	Total
Boxing	0	0	1	1
Total	0	0	1	1

Medals by date
Day	Date	1st place, gold medalist(s)	2nd place, silver medalist(s)	3rd place, bronze medalist(s)	Total
11	24 July	0	0	1	1
Total		0	0	1	1

Medals by gender
Gender	1st place, gold medalist(s)	2nd place, silver medalist(s)	3rd place, bronze medalist(s)	Total
Male	0	0	1	1
Female	0	0	0	0
Mixed	0	0	0	0
Total	0	0	1	1

== Athletics ==
Guyana qualified four track and field athletes (one men and three women).

- Key Note - Ranks given for track events are for the entire round
- Q = Qualified for the next round
- NR = National record
- GR = Games record
- DNF = Did not finish
- DNS = Did not start
- NM = No mark

Track
Men

Athlete	Event	Semifinals		Final	
Athlete	Event	Result	Rank	Result	Rank
Cleveland Forde	5,000 m	—N/a		15:19.48	11
Cleveland Forde	10,000 m	—N/a		31:23.00	10

Women

Athlete	Event	Semifinals		Final	
Athlete	Event	Result	Rank	Result	Rank
Aliann Pompey	400 m	53.03	13	Did not advance	
Marian Burnett	800 m	2:03.09	8 Q	2:00.40	4
Marian Burnett	1,500 m	—N/a		4:17.91 NR	4

Field events
Women

Athlete	Event	Final	
Athlete	Event	Distance	Position
Michelle Vaughn	Long jump	5.34	13
Michelle Vaughn	Triple jump	13.18	8

== Boxing ==
Guyana participated with a team of 2 athletes.

Key:
- RSC – Referee stops contest (unspecified).
- RSCO – Referee stops contest for an outclassed opponent.

Men

Athlete	Event	Round of 16	Quarterfinals	Semifinals	Final	Rank
Athlete	Event	Opposition Result	Opposition Result	Opposition Result	Opposition Result	Rank
Ryan Jeffers	−51 kg	Bye	Braulio Ávila (MEX); L 4-12	Did not advance		5
Clive Atwell	−54 kg	Bye	Klevon Denoon (TTO); W 17–12	Claudio Marrero (DOM); L 4–16	Did not advance	3rd place, bronze medalist(s)

== Diving ==
Megan Farrow qualified to women's 3 m springboard event, but she didn't participate.

== Taekwondo ==
Guyana participated with a team of 2 athletes.

Men

Athlete	Event	Round of 16	Quarterfinals	Semifinals	Final	Rank
Athlete	Event	Opposition Result	Opposition Result	Opposition Result	Opposition Result	Rank
David Rajjab	−80 kg	Duwal Asprilla (COL); W 4–1	Ángel Matos (CUB); L 1-4	Did not advance		
Adrian Spellen	+80 kg	Bye	Gerardo Ortíz (CUB); L 0–1	Did not advance		

== See also ==
- Guyana at the 2008 Summer Olympics
