= Boxing at the 2022 South American Games =

- Boxing pictogram
- Venue: Pabellón 1 of the SND Complex
- Dates: 8–13 October 2022
- Competitors: 88 from 13 nations

Boxing competitions at the 2022 South American Games in Asunción, Paraguay are being held from 8 to 13 October 2022 at Pabellón 1 of the SND Complex.

Thirteen medal events are scheduled to be contested; seven weight categories for men and six weight categories for women. A total of 88 athletes (54 men and 34 women) are competing in the events. Participating boxers must have been born between 1 January 1982 and 31 December 2003.

Colombia are the South American Games boxing competitions defending champions having won them in the previous edition in Cochabamba 2018.

== Participating nations ==
A total of 13 nations registered athletes for the boxing events. Each nation was able to enter a maximum of 13 boxers (7 men and 6 women), one boxer for each weight category.

- Argentina (9 boxers)
- Bolivia (6)
- Brazil (12)
- Chile (5)
- Colombia (13)
- Curaçao (2)
- Ecuador (8)
- Guyana (3)
- Panama (2)
- Paraguay (8)
- Peru (5)
- Uruguay (4)
- Venezuela (11)

== Venue ==
The boxing competitions are scheduled to be held at Pabellón 1 of the SND Complex.

== Medal summary ==
=== Medal table ===
* Host nation (Paraguay)

| Rank | Nation | Gold | Silver | Bronze | Total |
|---|---|---|---|---|---|
| 1 | Brazil (BRA) | 7 | 2 | 1 | 10 |
| 2 | Colombia (COL) | 3 | 4 | 5 | 12 |
| 3 | Ecuador (ECU) | 2 | 2 | 3 | 7 |
| 4 | Panama (PAN) | 1 | 0 | 0 | 1 |
| 5 | Argentina (ARG) | 0 | 2 | 2 | 4 |
| 6 | Uruguay (URU) | 0 | 2 | 1 | 3 |
| 7 | Venezuela (VEN) | 0 | 1 | 5 | 6 |
| 8 | Bolivia (BOL) | 0 | 0 | 3 | 3 |
| 9 | Guyana (GUY) | 0 | 0 | 2 | 2 |
| 9 | Paraguay (PAR)* | 0 | 0 | 2 | 2 |
| 9 | Peru (PER) | 0 | 0 | 2 | 2 |
| Totals (11 entries) | | 13 | 13 | 26 | 52 |

Source: ASU2022 Medal Table - Boxing

=== Medalists ===
==== Men's events ====
| Event | Gold | Silver | Bronze |
|---|---|---|---|
| Flyweight (51 kg) | Luis Fernando Delgado; Ecuador | Juan Palacios; Colombia | Ruan Do Vale; Brazil |
| Flyweight (51 kg) | Luis Fernando Delgado; Ecuador | Juan Palacios; Colombia | Yordy Hinojosa; Bolivia |
| Featherweight (57 kg) | Luiz Gabriel Oliveira; Brazil | Jean Caicedo; Ecuador | Keevin Allicock; Guyana |
| Featherweight (57 kg) | Luiz Gabriel Oliveira; Brazil | Jean Caicedo; Ecuador | Yoel Finol; Venezuela |
| Light welterweight (63.5 kg) | José Viáfara; Colombia | Javier Cardozo; Uruguay | Leodan Pezo; Peru |
| Light welterweight (63.5 kg) | José Viáfara; Colombia | Javier Cardozo; Uruguay | Jesús Cova; Venezuela |
| Light middleweight (71 kg) | Wanderson de Oliveira; Brazil | Alexander Rangel; Colombia | José Gabriel Rodríguez; Ecuador |
| Light middleweight (71 kg) | Wanderson de Oliveira; Brazil | Alexander Rangel; Colombia | Christian Palacio; Venezuela |
| Light heavyweight (80 kg) | Wanderley Pereira; Brazil | Benjamín Escudero; Argentina | Desmond Amsterdam; Guyana |
| Light heavyweight (80 kg) | Wanderley Pereira; Brazil | Benjamín Escudero; Argentina | Jhojan Caicedo; Colombia |
| Heavyweight (92 kg) | Julio Castillo; Ecuador | Keno Machado; Brazil | José María Lúcar; Peru |
| Heavyweight (92 kg) | Julio Castillo; Ecuador | Keno Machado; Brazil | Marlon Hurtado; Colombia |
| Super heavyweight (+92 kg) | Abner Teixeira; Brazil | Gerlon Congo; Ecuador | Cristian Salcedo; Colombia |
| Super heavyweight (+92 kg) | Abner Teixeira; Brazil | Gerlon Congo; Ecuador | Marcelo Núñez; Paraguay |

==== Women's events ====
| Event | Gold | Silver | Bronze |
|---|---|---|---|
| Light flyweight (50 kg) | Ingrit Valencia; Colombia | Caroline de Almeida; Brazil | Ayda Santalla; Bolivia |
| Light flyweight (50 kg) | Ingrit Valencia; Colombia | Caroline de Almeida; Brazil | Aldana López; Argentina |
| Bantamweight (54 kg) | Tatiana de Jesus; Brazil | Johana Gómez; Venezuela | Milagros Herrera; Argentina |
| Bantamweight (54 kg) | Tatiana de Jesus; Brazil | Johana Gómez; Venezuela | María Martínez; Colombia |
| Featherweight (57 kg) | Jucielen Romeu; Brazil | Yeni Arias; Colombia | Minerva Montiel; Paraguay |
| Featherweight (57 kg) | Jucielen Romeu; Brazil | Yeni Arias; Colombia | Monica da Silva; Uruguay |
| Lightweight (60 kg) | Angie Valdés; Colombia | Camila Piñeiro; Uruguay | María José Palacios; Ecuador |
| Lightweight (60 kg) | Angie Valdés; Colombia | Camila Piñeiro; Uruguay | Krisandy Ríos; Venezuela |
| Welterweight (66 kg) | Bárbara Maria dos Santos; Brazil | Lucía Pérez; Argentina | María Eugenia Ortega; Bolivia |
| Welterweight (66 kg) | Bárbara Maria dos Santos; Brazil | Lucía Pérez; Argentina | Shirleidis Orozco; Colombia |
| Middleweight (75 kg) | Atheyna Bylon; Panama | Luisa Montiel; Colombia | Ingrith Maldonado; Ecuador |
| Middleweight (75 kg) | Atheyna Bylon; Panama | Luisa Montiel; Colombia | Maryelis Yriza; Venezuela |

== Results ==
=== Men's 51kg ===
Quarterfinals
(Peru) Williams Peña | 0
(Brazil) Ruan De Jesus | 5
(Venezuela) Miguel Ramos | 1
(Ecuador) Luis Delgado | 4
(Paraguay) Oliver Ovando | 0
(Bolivia) Yordy Hinojosa | 5
(Colombia) Juan Palacios | 4
(Argentina) Ramón Quiroga | 1

Semifinals
(Brazil) Ruan De Jesus | 1
(Ecuador) Luis Delgado | 4
(Bolivia) Yordy Hinojosa | 0
(Colombia) Juan Palacios | 5

Final
(Ecuador) Luis Delgado | 4
(Colombia) Juan Palacios | 1

=== Men's 57kg ===
Round of 16
(Paraguay) Casto Vázquez | 0
(Peru) Darwin Pérez | 5

Quarterfinals
(Guyana) Keevin Allicock | 5
(Peru) Darwin Pérez | 0
(Ecuador) Jean Caicedo | 4
(Chile) Héctor Tapia | 1
(Colombia) Yilmar González | 0
(Venezuela) Yoel Finol | 5
(Bolivia) Sergio Alcocer | RSC
(Brazil) Luiz Gabriel Oliveira

Semifinals
(Guyana) Keevin Allicock | WO
(Ecuador) Jean Caicedo
(Venezuela) Yoel Finol | 0
(Brazil) Luiz Gabriel Oliveira | 5

Final
(Ecuador) Jean Caicedo | 0
(Brazil) Luiz Gabriel Oliveira | 5

=== Men's 63.5kg ===
Round of 16
(Ecuador) Jhancarlo Anchico | 5
(Argentina) Joel Mafauad | 0
(Bolivia) José Nuñez | 0
(Uruguay) Javier Cardozo | 5

Quarterfinals
(Colombia) José Viáfara | 5
(Ecuador) Jhancarlo Anchico | 0
(Peru) Leodan Pezo | 3
(Guyana) Colin Lewis | 2
(Venezuela) Jesús Cova | 3
(Brazil) Yuri Dos Reis | 2
(Uruguay) Javier Cardozo | 5
(Paraguay) Facundo Forcado | 0

Semifinals
(Colombia) José Viáfara | 5
(Peru) Leodan Pezo | 0
(Venezuela) Jesús Cova | 0
(Uruguay) Javier Cardozo | 5

Final
(Colombia) José Viáfara | 5
(Uruguay) Javier Cardozo | 0

=== Male's 71kg ===
Round of 16
(Brazil) Wanderson De Oliveira | 5
(Peru) Luis Miranda | 0
(Panama) Eduardo Beckford | 5
(Argentina) Joel Salva | 0

Quarterfinals
(Brazil) Wanderson De Oliveira
(Paraguay) Pablo Álvarez | RSC
(Venezuela) Christian Palacio | 5
(Uruguay) Jorge Pereyra | 0
(Curaçao) Gregory Scharbaai | RSC
(Colombia) Alexander Rangel
(Panama) Eduardo Beckford | 2
(Ecuador) José Rodríguez

Semifinals
(Brazil) Wanderson De Oliveira | 5
(Venezuela) Christian Palacio | 0
(Colombia) Alexander Rangel | 3
(Ecuador) José Rodríguez | 2

Final
(Brazil) Wanderson De Oliveira | 4
(Colombia) Alexander Rangel | 1

=== Men's 80kg ===
Quarterfinals
(Guyana) Desmond Amsterdam | 5
(Venezuela) Diego Pereyra | 0
(Curaçao) Dwinley Mathilda | RSC
(Colombia) Jhojan Caicedo
(Brazil) Wanderley Pereira | 5
(Paraguay) Lino Ruiz | 0

Semifinals
(Guyana) Desmond Amsterdam | 0
(Argentina) Benjamín Escudero | 5
(Colombia) Jhojan Caicedo | 1
(Brazil) Wanderley Pereira | 4

Final
(Argentina) Benjamín Escudero | 2
(Brazil) Wanderley Pereira | 3

=== Male's 92kg ===
Semifinals
(Colombia) Marlon Hurtado | 0
(Brazil) Keno Machado | 5
(Ecuador) Julio Castillo | 5
(Peru) José María Lucar | 0

Final
(Brazil) Keno Machado | 0
(Ecuador) Julio Castillo | 5

=== Men's +92kg ===
Quarterfinals
(Chile) Miguel Veliz | 0
(Colombia) Cristian Salcedo | 5
(Bolivia) Ever Quisbert | 0
(Paraguay) Marcelo Nuñez | 5

Semifinals
(Ecuador) Gerlon Congo | 3
(Colombia) Cristian Salcedo | 2
(Paraguay) Marcelo Nuñez | 0
(Brazil) Abner Teixeira | 5

Final
(Ecuador) Gerlon Congo | 0
(Brazil) Abner Teixeira | 5

=== Women's 50kg ===
Quarterfinals
(Colombia) Ingrit Valencia | 5
(Venezuela) Tayonis Cedeño | 0

Semifinals
(Bolivia) Ayda Santalla | RSC
(Colombia) Ingrit Valencia
(Brazil) Caroline de Almeida | 5
(Argentina) Aldana López | 0

Final
(Colombia) Ingrit Valencia | 5
(Brazil) Caroline de Almeida | 0

=== Women's 54kg ===
Semifinals
(Colombia) María Martinez | 0
(Brazil) Tatiana Chagas | 5
(Argentina) Milagros Herrera | 0
(Venezuela) Johana Gómez | 5

Final
(Brazil) Tatiana Chagas | 5
(Venezuela) Johana Gómez | 0

=== Women's 57kg ===
Quarterfinals
(Venezuela) Omailyn Alcala | 1
(Colombia) Yeni Arias | 4
(Argentina) Sofía Robles | 0
(Brazil) Jucielen Romeu | 5
(Chile) Tamara Maturana | 0
(Paraguay) Minerva Montiel | 5

Semifinals
(Colombia) Yeni Arias | 5
(Uruguay) Mónica Da Silva | 0
(Brazil) Jucielen Romeu | 5
(Paraguay) Minerva Montiel | 0

Final
(Colombia) Yeni Arias | 0
(Brazil) Jucielen Romeu | 5

=== Women's 60kg ===
Quarterfinals
(Uruguay) Camila Piñeiro | 5
(Argentina) Viviana Palavecino | 0
(Paraguay) Yohana Ramírez | RSC
(Venezuela) Krisandy Rios
(Brazil) Rebeca Santos | 0
(Colombia) Angie Valdés | 5

Semifinals
(Ecuador) María José Palacios | 1
(Uruguay) Camila Piñeiro | 4
(Venezuela) Krisandy Rios | 0
(Colombia) Angie Valdés | 5

Final
(Uruguay) Camila Piñeiro | 0
(Colombia) Angie Valdés | 5

=== Women's 66kg ===
Quarterfinals
(Venezuela) Ninoska Pérez | 0
(Colombia) Shirleidis Orozco | 5
(Chile) Catalina Castro | 0
(Argentina) Lucía Pérez | 5

Semifinals
(Brazil) Bárbara Maria dos Santos | 3
(Colombia) Shirleidis Orozco | 2
(Argentina) Lucía Pérez
(Bolivia) María Ortega | RSC

Final
(Brazil) Bárbara Maria dos Santos | 4
(Argentina) Lucía Pérez | 1

=== Women's 75kg ===
Semifinals
(Panama) Atheyna Bylon | 4
(Venezuela) Maryelis Yriza | 1
(Colombia) Luisa Montiel | 4
(Ecuador) Ingrith Maldonado | 1

Final
(Panama) Atheyna Bylon | 5
(Colombia) Luisa Montiel | 0
