= Squash at the 2011 Pan American Games – Qualification =

Qualification was done at the 2010 Pan American Championship in Guatemala City, Guatemala. A maximum of sixty athletes will compete at the squash competition. There will be a maximum of 35 male and 25 female competitors total. Each nation can enter a maximum of three male and female athletes, for a total of six athletes. Of these athletes, two will compete in the individual events per gender, one pair will compete in doubles per gender, and three will compete in a team in the team event per gender. The top seven nations at the 2010 Pan American Squash Championship can qualify women's teams, while the top ten nations can qualify men's teams. Mexico qualifies a men's and women's team as the host nation. Outside of this, athletes can qualify individually, with a maximum of one female and two male athletes qualifying individually.

== Qualification summary ==
Nation	Men's Individual	Men's Team	Women's Individual	Women's Team	Total
Argentina	3	X	3	X	6
Barbados	1				1
Brazil	3	X	3	X	6
Canada	3	X	3	X	6
Chile	3	X	3	X	6
Colombia	3	X	3	X	6
El Salvador	3	X			3
Guatemala	3	X	3	X	6
Guyana			1		1
Jamaica	1				1
Mexico	3	X	3	X	6
Paraguay	3	X			3
Peru	3	X			3
United States	3	X	3	X	6
Total athletes	35	33	25	24	60
Total NOCs	13	11	9	8	14

== Men ==
Event	Location	Ranking	Athletes per NOC	Qualified
Host Nation	-	-	3	Mexico
2010 Pan American Championships, team event	Guatemala City	Top 10*	3	Canada; United States; Brazil; Argentina; Colombia; Guatemala; El Salvador; Peru; Chile; Paraguay
Wildcards	-	-	Up to 2	Shawn Simpson (BAR); Christopher Binnie (JAM)
TOTAL			35	

- Top ten excluding Mexico (who won the Pan American Championship).

== Women ==
Event	Location	Ranking	Athletes per NOC	Qualified
Host Nation	-	-	3	Mexico
2010 Pan American Championships, team event	Guatemala City	Top 7*	3	United States; Canada; Colombia; Argentina; Guatemala; Brazil; Chile
2010 Pan American Championships, individual event	Guatemala City	1	1	Nicolette Fernandes (GUY)
TOTAL			25	

- Top seven excluding Mexico (who finished third at the Pan American Championship).
