= List of Canadian records in Olympic weightlifting =

The following are the records of Canada in Olympic weightlifting. Records are maintained in each weight class for the snatch lift, clean and jerk lift, and the total for both lifts by the Canadian Weightlifting Federation (CWFHC).

== Current records ==
Key to tables: Awaiting ratification Not ratified or later rescinded by CWFHC

=== Men ===
| Event | Record | Athlete | Date | Meet | Place | Ref |
60 kg
| Snatch | 105 kg | Antonin Lanoue | 6 June 2025 | | | |
| Clean & Jerk | 140 kg | Antonin Lanoue | 1 November 2025 | | | |
| Total | 244 kg | Antonin Lanoue | 1 November 2025 | | | |
65 kg
| Snatch | 119 kg | Sébastien Groulx | 29 October 2005 | | | |
| Clean & Jerk | 155 kg | Sébastien Groulx | 17 December 2000 | | | |
| Total | 270 kg | Sébastien Groulx | 17 December 2000 | | | |
71 kg
| Snatch | 136 kg | Francis Luna-Grenier | 20 December 2014 | | | |
| Clean & Jerk | 171 kg | Francis Luna-Grenier | 20 December 2014 | | | |
| Total | 307 kg | Francis Luna-Grenier | 20 December 2014 | | | |
79 kg
| Snatch | 150 kg | Alex Bellemarre | 11 May 2018 | | | |
| Clean & Jerk | 178 kg | Francis Luna-Grenier | 28 March 2015 | | | |
| Clean & Jerk | 179 kg | Shad Darsigny | 16 May 2026 | Canadian Championships | La Prairie, Canada | |
| Total | 323 kg | Alex Bellemarre | 11 May 2018 | | | |
| Total | 326 kg | Shad Darsigny | 16 May 2026 | Canadian Championships | La Prairie, Canada | |
88 kg
| Snatch | 157 kg | Pascal Plamondon | 11 July 2015 | | | |
| Snatch | 161 kg | Braydon Kennedy | 28 July 2026 | Commonwealth Games | Glasgow, United Kingdom | |
| Clean & Jerk | 190 kg | Pascal Plamondon | 5 August 2016 | Olympic Games | Rio de Janeiro, Brazil | |
| Total | 345 kg | Pascal Plamondon | 5 August 2016 | Olympic Games | Rio de Janeiro, Brazil | |
94 kg
| Snatch | 181 kg | Boady Santavy | 22 April 2021 | Pan American Championships | Santo Domingo, Dominican Republic | |
| Clean & Jerk | 210 kg | Boady Santavy | 24 September 2019 | | | |
| Total | 389 kg | Boady Santavy | 22 April 2021 | Pan American Championships | Santo Domingo, Dominican Republic | |
110 kg
| Snatch | 170 kg | Akos Sandor | 16 April 2000 | | | |
| Clean & Jerk | 207 kg | Akos Sandor | 16 April 2000 | | | |
| Total | 377 kg | Akos Sandor | 16 April 2000 | | | |
+110 kg
| Snatch | 175 kg | Standard | 18 May 2014 | Canadian Championships | Saskatoon, Canada | |
| Clean & Jerk | 229 kg | Standard | 31 July 2014 | Commonwealth Games | Glasgow, Great Britain | |
| Total | 402 kg | Standard | 18 May 2014 | Canadian Championships | Saskatoon, Canada | |

=== Women ===
| Event | Record | Athlete | Date | Meet | Place | Ref |
48 kg
| Snatch | 80 kg | Marilou Dozois-Prévost | 31 March 2012 | | | |
| Clean & Jerk | 101 kg | Amanda Braddock | 24 March 2018 | | | |
| Total | 178 kg | Marilou Dozois-Prévost | 31 March 2012 | | | |
53 kg
| Snatch | 88 kg | Marilou Dozois-Prévost | 22 May 2011 | | | |
| Clean & Jerk | 115 kg | Maryse Turcotte | 19 May 2001 | | | |
| Total | 197 kg | Maryse Turcotte | 19 May 2001 | | | |
58 kg
| Snatch | 93 kg | Ann-Sophie Taschereau | 6 December 2025 | | | |
| Snatch | 94 kg | Ann-Sophie Taschereau | 27 July 2026 | Commonwealth Games | Glasgow, United Kingdom | |
| Clean & Jerk | 120 kg | Maryse Turcotte | 14 August 2004 | | | |
| Clean & Jerk | 121 kg | Ann-Sophie Taschereau | 27 July 2026 | Commonwealth Games | Glasgow, United Kingdom | |
| Total | 211 kg | Maryse Turcotte | 6 December 2025 | | | |
| Total | 215 kg | Ann-Sophie Taschereau | 27 July 2026 | Commonwealth Games | Glasgow, United Kingdom | |
63 kg
| Snatch | 106 kg | Christine Girard | 23 October 2011 | | | |
| Clean & Jerk | 134 kg | Christine Girard | 31 March 2012 | | | |
| Total | 238 kg | Christine Girard | 23 October 2011 | | | |
69 kg
| Snatch | 110 kg | Charlotte Simoneau | 22 August 2025 | Junior Pan American Games | Luque, Paraguay | |
| Clean & Jerk | 137 kg | Marie-Ève Beauchemin-Nadeau | 2 April 2016 | | | |
| Total | 240 kg | Marie-Ève Beauchemin-Nadeau | 2 April 2016 | | | |
77 kg
| Snatch | 111 kg | Charlotte Simoneau | 5 May 2025 | World Junior Championships | Lima, Peru | |
| Clean & Jerk | 141 kg | Marie-Ève Beauchemin-Nadeau | 29 March 2014 | | | |
| Total | 251 kg | Marie-Ève Beauchemin-Nadeau | 29 March 2014 | | | |
86 kg
| Snatch | 109 kg | Rosalie Dumas | 4 November 2023 | Quebec Championships | Saint-Hyacinthe, Canada | |
| Clean & Jerk | 134 kg | Maya Laylor | 23 October 2023 | | | |
| Total | 238 kg | Maya Laylor | 31 March 2023 | Pan American Championships | Bariloche, Argentina | |
+86 kg
| Snatch | 112 kg | Emma Friesen | 23 October 2022 | | | |
| Clean & Jerk | 146 kg | Etta Love | 27 September 2024 | World Junior Championships | León, Spain | |
| Total | 254 kg | Etta Love | 27 September 2024 | World Junior Championships | León, Spain | |

== Historical records ==
=== Men (2018–2025) ===
| Event | Record | Athlete | Date | Meet | Place | Ref |
55 kg
| Snatch | | | | | | |
| Clean & Jerk | | | | | | |
| Total | 226 kg | Standard | | | | |
61 kg
| Snatch | 119 kg | Youri Simard | 30 July 2022 | Commonwealth Games | Marston Green, Great Britain | |
| Clean & Jerk | 150 kg | Youri Simard | 6 December 2022 (Note: by official result source, 5 December by CWFCH source, a typo) | World Championships | Bogotá, Colombia | |
| Total | 268 kg | Youri Simard | 30 July 2022 | Commonwealth Games | Marston Green, Great Britain | |
67 kg
| Snatch | | | | | | |
| Clean & Jerk | | | | | | |
| Total | 276 kg | Standard | | | | |
73 kg
| Snatch | 140 kg | Shad Darsigny | 4 June 2023 | Canadian Junior Championships | La Prairie, Canada | |
| Clean & Jerk | 176 kg | Nicolas Vachon | 19 May 2023 | | | |
| Total | 310 kg | Nicolas Vachon | 19 May 2023 | | | |
81 kg
| Snatch | 154 kg | Alex Bellemarre | 25 April 2019 | Pan American Championships | Guatemala City, Guatemala | |
| Clean & Jerk | 184 kg | Nicolas Vachon | 21 April 2021 | Pan American Championships | Santo Domingo, Dominican Republic | |
| Total | 337 kg | Alex Bellemarre | 25 April 2019 | Pan American Championships | Guatemala City, Guatemala | |
89 kg
| Snatch | 172 kg | Boady Santavy | 10 December 2023 | IWF Grand Prix II | Doha, Qatar | |
| Clean & Jerk | 200 kg | Boady Santavy | 10 December 2023 | IWF Grand Prix II | Doha, Qatar | |
| Total | 372 kg | Boady Santavy | 10 December 2023 | IWF Grand Prix II | Doha, Qatar | |
96 kg
| Snatch | 181 kg | Boady Santavy | 22 April 2021 | Pan American Championships | Santo Domingo, Dominican Republic | |
| Clean & Jerk | 210 kg | Boady Santavy | 24 September 2019 | World Championships | Pattaya, Thailand | |
| Total | 389 kg | Boady Santavy | 22 April 2021 | Pan American Championships | Santo Domingo, Dominican Republic | |
102 kg
| Snatch | 168 kg | Boady Santavy | 6 November 2021 | | | |
| Clean & Jerk | 206 kg | Xavier Lusignan | 2 March 2025 | | | |
| Total | 371 kg | Xavier Lusignan | 2 March 2025 | | | |
109 kg
| Snatch | 170 kg | Akos Sandor | 16 April 2000 | | Shreveport, United States | |
| Clean & Jerk | 207 kg | Akos Sandor | 16 April 2000 | | Shreveport, United States | |
| Total | 377 kg | Akos Sandor | 16 April 2000 | | Shreveport, United States | |
+109 kg
| Snatch | 175 kg | George Kobaladze | 18 May 2014 | Canadian Championships | Saskatoon, Canada | |
| Clean & Jerk | 229 kg | George Kobaladze | 31 July 2014 | Commonwealth Games | Glasgow, Great Britain | |
| Total | 402 kg | George Kobaladze | 18 May 2014 | Canadian Championships | Saskatoon, Canada | |

=== Men (1998–2018) ===
| Event | Record | Athlete | Date | Meet | Place | Ref |
–56 kg
| Snatch | 107.5 kg | François Lagacé | 16 May 1998 | | | |
| Clean & Jerk | 127.5 kg | François Lagacé | 16 May 1998 | | | |
| Total | 235 kg | François Lagacé | 16 May 1998 | | | |
–62 kg
| Snatch | 119 kg | Sébastien Groulx | 29 October 2005 | | | |
| Clean & Jerk | 155 kg | Sébastien Groulx | 17 December 2000 | | | |
| Total | 270 kg | Sébastien Groulx | 17 December 2000 | | | |
–69 kg
| Snatch | 136 kg | Francis Luna-Grenier | 20 December 2014 | | Huntingdon, Canada | |
| Clean & Jerk | 171 kg | Francis Luna-Grenier | 20 December 2014 | | Huntingdon, Canada | |
| Total | 307 kg | Francis Luna-Grenier | 20 December 2014 | | Huntingdon, Canada | |
–77 kg
| Snatch | 146 kg | Alex Bellemarre | 20 May 2017 | Canadian Championships | La Prairie, Canada | |
| Clean & Jerk | 178 kg | Francis Luna-Grenier | 28 March 2015 | | La Prairie, Canada | |
| Total | 318 kg | Francis Luna-Grenier | 28 March 2015 | | La Prairie, Canada | |
–85 kg
| Snatch | 157 kg | Pascal Plamondon | 13 July 2015 | Pan American Games | Toronto, Canada | |
| Clean & Jerk | 190 kg | Pascal Plamondon | 12 August 2016 | Olympic Games | Rio de Janeiro, Brazil | |
| Total | 345 kg | Pascal Plamondon | 12 August 2016 | Olympic Games | Rio de Janeiro, Brazil | |
–94 kg
| Snatch | 168 kg | Boady Santavy | 8 April 2018 | Commonwealth Games | Gold Coast, Australia | |
| Clean & Jerk | 201 kg | Boady Santavy | 3 December 2017 | World Championships | Anaheim, United States | |
| Total | 369 kg | Boady Santavy | 8 April 2018 | Commonwealth Games | Gold Coast, Australia | |
–105 kg
| Snatch | 170 kg | Akos Sandor | 16 April 2000 | | Shreveport, United States | |
| Clean & Jerk | 207.5 kg | Akos Sandor | 16 April 2000 | | Shreveport, United States | |
| Total | 377.5 kg | Akos Sandor | 16 April 2000 | | Shreveport, United States | |
+105 kg
| Snatch | 175 kg | George Kobaladze | 18 May 2014 | Canadian Championships | Saskatoon, Canada | |
| Clean & Jerk | 229 kg | George Kobaladze | 31 July 2014 | Commonwealth Games | Glasgow, Great Britain | |
| Total | 402 kg | George Kobaladze | 18 May 2014 | Canadian Championships | Saskatoon, Canada | |

=== Women (2018–2025) ===
| Event | Record | Athlete | Date | Meet | Place | Ref |
45 kg
| Snatch | 68 kg | Isabella Brown | 4 June 2022 | Canadian Junior Championships | La Prairie, Canada | |
| Clean & Jerk | 76 kg | Isabella Brown | 4 June 2022 | Canadian Junior Championships | La Prairie, Canada | |
| Total | 144 kg | Isabella Brown | 4 June 2022 | Canadian Junior Championships | La Prairie, Canada | |
49 kg
| Snatch | 80 kg | Marilou Dozois-Prévost | 31 March 2012 | | | |
| Clean & Jerk | 101 kg | Amanda Braddock | 24 March 2018 | | | |
| Total | 178 kg | Marilou Dozois-Prévost | 31 March 2012 | | | |
55 kg
| Snatch | 91 kg | Rachel Leblanc-Bazinet | 20 September 2019 | World Championships | Pattaya, Thailand | |
| Clean & Jerk | 115 kg | Maryse Turcotte | 19 May 2001 | | Collingwood, Canada | |
| Total | 201 kg | Rachel Leblanc-Bazinet | 20 September 2019 | World Championships | Pattaya, Thailand | |
59 kg
| Snatch | 106 kg | Maude Charron | 3 April 2024 | World Cup | Phuket, Thailand | |
| Clean & Jerk | 130 kg | Maude Charron | 3 April 2024 | World Cup | Phuket, Thailand | |
| Total | 236 kg | Maude Charron | 3 April 2024 | World Cup | Phuket, Thailand | |
64 kg
| Snatch | 107 kg | Maude Charron | 21 April 2021 | Pan American Championships | Santo Domingo, Dominican Republic | |
| Clean & Jerk | 134 kg | Christine Girard | 31 March 2012 | | Edmonton, Canada | |
| Total | 240 kg | Maude Charron | 21 April 2021 | Pan American Championships | Santo Domingo, Dominican Republic | |
71 kg
| Snatch | 111 kg | Charlotte Simoneau | 5 May 2025 | World Junior Championships | Lima, Peru | |
| Clean & Jerk | 137 kg | Marie-Ève Beauchemin-Nadeau | 2 April 2016 | | | |
| Total | 245 kg | Charlotte Simoneau | 5 May 2025 | World Junior Championships | Lima, Peru | |
76 kg
| Snatch | 110 kg | Jeane Lassen | 18 May 2008 | | | |
| Clean & Jerk | 141 kg | Marie-Ève Beauchemin-Nadeau | 29 March 2014 | | La Prairie, Canada | |
| Total | 251 kg | Marie-Ève Beauchemin-Nadeau | 29 March 2014 | | La Prairie, Canada | |
81 kg
| Snatch | 107 kg | Maya Laylor | 31 March 2023 | Pan American Championships | Bariloche, Argentina | |
| Snatch | 108 kg | Rosalie Dumas | 14 June 2023 | IWF Grand Prix | Havana, Cuba | |
| Snatch | 109 kg | Rosalie Dumas | 4 November 2023 | Quebec Championships | Saint-Hyacinthe, Canada | |
| Clean & Jerk | 134 kg | Maya Laylor | 23 October 2023 | | | |
| Total | 238 kg | Maya Laylor | 31 March 2023 | Pan American Championships | Bariloche, Argentina | |
87 kg
| Snatch | 105 kg | Rosalie Dumas | 28 January 2023 | Pan American Championship Qualification Tournament | La Prairie, Canada | |
| Clean & Jerk | 136 kg | Maya Laylor | 20 May 2023 | | | |
| Total | 239 kg | Maya Laylor | 20 May 2023 | | | |
+87 kg
| Snatch | 112 kg | Emma Friesen | 23 October 2022 | | | |
| Clean & Jerk | 146 kg | Etta Love | 27 September 2024 | World Junior Championships | León, Spain | |
| Total | 254 kg | Etta Love | 27 September 2024 | World Junior Championships | León, Spain | |

=== Women (1998–2018) ===
| Event | Record | Athlete | Date | Meet | Place | Ref |
–48 kg
| Snatch | 80 kg | Marilou Dozois-Prévost | 31 March 2012 | | | |
| Clean & Jerk | 101 kg | Amanda Braddock | 24 March 2018 | Ontario Championships | Toronto, Canada | |
| Total | 178 kg | Marilou Dozois-Prévost | 31 March 2012 | | | |
–53 kg
| Snatch | 88 kg | Marilou Dozois-Prévost | 22 May 2011 | | Scarborough, Canada | |
| Clean & Jerk | 115 kg | Maryse Turcotte | 19 May 2001 | | Collingwood, Canada | |
| Total | 197.5 kg | Maryse Turcotte | 19 May 2001 | | Collingwood, Canada | |
–58 kg
| Snatch | 92 kg | Lacey Van Der Marel | 2 April 2016 | | | |
| Clean & Jerk | 120.5 kg | Maryse Turcotte | 17 May 2003 | | | |
| Total | 210 kg | Maryse Turcotte | 20 May 2000 | | | |
–63 kg
| Snatch | 106 kg | Christine Girard | 20 August 2011 | | Lake Country, Canada | |
| Clean & Jerk | 134 kg | Christine Girard | 31 March 2012 | | Edmonton, Canada | |
| Total | 238 kg | Christine Girard | 25 October 2011 | Pan American Games | Guadalajara, Mexico | |
–69 kg
| Snatch | 106 kg | Marie-Ève Beauchemin-Nadeau | 31 March 2012 | | | |
| Clean & Jerk | 137 kg | Marie-Ève Beauchemin-Nadeau | 2 April 2016 | | | |
| Total | 240 kg | Marie-Ève Beauchemin-Nadeau | 31 March 2012 | | | |
–75 kg
| Snatch | 110 kg | Jeane Lassen | 18 May 2008 | | | |
| Clean & Jerk | 141 kg | Marie-Ève Beauchemin-Nadeau | 29 March 2014 | | La Prairie, Canada | |
| Total | 251 kg | Marie-Ève Beauchemin-Nadeau | 29 March 2014 | | La Prairie, Canada | |
–90 kg
| Snatch | 111 kg | Standard Record | | | | |
| Clean & Jerk | 142 kg | Standard Record | | | | |
| Total | 252 kg | Standard Record | | | | |
+90 kg
| Snatch | 105 kg | Susanne Dandenault | 18 December 2004 | | | |
| Clean & Jerk | 136.5 kg | Susanne Dandenault | 13 June 2004 | | | |
| Total | 237.5 kg | Susanne Dandenault | 13 June 2004 | | | |
