= Boxing at the 2023 Pan American Games – Men's 57 kg =

Men's 57 kg at the 2023 Pan American Games
- Venue: Olympic Training Center
- Start date: October 19, 2023
- End date: October 27, 2023
- Competitors: 14 from 14 nations

Medalists
Gold medal	Jahmal Harvey	United States
Silver medal	Saidel Horta	Cuba
Bronze medal	Luiz Gabriel Oliveira	Brazil
Bronze medal	José de los Santos	Dominican Republic

The Men's 57 kg competition of the boxing events at the 2023 Pan American Games in Santiago, Chile, was held between October 19 and 27 at the Olympic Training Center. A total of 14 boxers from 14 NOC's competed.

The two finalists will qualify for the 2024 Summer Olympics in Paris, France.

== Qualification ==
There was a quota of 130 boxers to compete at the games (ten per event). The host nation (Chile) received automatic qualification spots for all events. The remainder of the spots were awarded through various qualifying tournaments. However, the International Olympic Committee later decided the competition was an open registration event, meaning any NOC could enter a boxer into the event.

== Competition format ==
Like all Pan American boxing events, the competition is a straight single-elimination tournament. Both semifinal losers are awarded bronze medals, so no boxers compete again after their first loss. Bouts consist of 3 rounds "10-point must" scoring system used, where the winner of each round must be awarded 10 points and the loser a lesser amount, and the elimination of the padded headgear. Five judges scored each bout. The winner will be the boxer who scored the most at the end of the match.

== Results ==
Round of 16 (October 19)
Irvin Ibarguen (PAN)
Keevin Allicock (GUY)	RSC
Victor Tremblay (CAN)
Luiz Gabriel Oliveira (BRA)	RSC
Juan Reyes Donis (EAI)	0
Lucas Fernández (URU)	5
Miguel Vega (MEX)	0
Saidel Horta (CUB)	5
Yilmar González (COL)	4
Caleb Tirado (PUR)	1
José de los Santos (DOM)	4
Yoel Finol (VEN)	1

Quarterfinals (October 23)
Jahmal Harvey (USA)	5
Keevin Allicock (GUY)	0
Luiz Gabriel Oliveira (BRA)	5
Lucas Fernández (URU)	0
Saidel Horta (CUB)	3
Yilmar González (COL)	2
José de los Santos (DOM)	5
Jean Caicedo (ECU)	0

Semifinals (October 26)
Jahmal Harvey (USA)	5
Luiz Gabriel Oliveira (BRA)	0
Saidel Horta (CUB)	4
José de los Santos (DOM)	1

Final (October 27)
Jahmal Harvey (USA)	5
Saidel Horta (CUB)	0
