= Luiz Gabriel Oliveira =

Brazilian boxer (born 2001)

Personal information
- National team: Brazil
- Born: 24 January 2001 (age 25) São Caetano do Sul, SP, Brazil
- Height: 1.72 m (5 ft 8 in)

Sport
- Country: Brazil
- Sport: Boxing
Medal record
Men's amateur boxing
Representing Brazil
World Championships
Silver medal – second place	2025 Liverpool	60 kg
Pan American Games
Bronze medal – third place	2023 Santiago	-57 kg
South American Games
Gold medal – first place	2022 Asunción	Featherweight
Gold medal – first place	2026 Santa Fe	–60 kg
Youth Olympic Games
Bronze medal – third place	2018 Buenos Aires	Flyweight

Luiz Gabriel do Nascimento Chalot de Oliveira (born 24 January 2001) is a Brazilian boxer. He is the grandson of Olympic medalist Servílio de Oliveira.

== Career ==
In 2018, Oliveira competed in the Summer Youth Olympics held in Buenos Aires, Argentina, where he won a bronze medal in the boys' flyweight division.

Due to the COVID-19 pandemic, international boxing events were halted, preventing Oliveira from earning world ranking points and ultimately disqualifying him from the 2020 Olympic Games. When competitions resumed, the International Boxing Association (IBA) decided that the highest-ranked athletes would qualify for the Tokyo Olympics, leaving Oliveira out of the competition. He then shifted his focus to preparing for the Paris 2024 Olympics.

At the 2021 AIBA World Boxing Championships in Belgrade, Serbia, Oliveira won two bouts but was eliminated in the round of 16 by Jahmal Harvey in the featherweight category.

In 2022, Oliveira claimed the gold medal in the featherweight division at the Boxing Continental of the Americas in Guayaquil, Ecuador, defeating world champion Jahmal Harvey in the final. Later that year, he won another gold medal in the featherweight (57 kg) category at the South American Games held in Asunción, Paraguay.

At the 2023 IBA Men's World Boxing Championships in Tashkent, Uzbekistan, Oliveira won his first fight but was eliminated in the round of 16 by Asror Vohidov in the featherweight category.

He continued his success by securing a bronze medal in the 57 kg category at the 2023 Pan American Games held in Santiago, Chile.

At the 2024 Summer Olympics, he had to face Jahmal Harvey again in the first fight, and ended up being eliminated by the judges' decision of 3 to 2.

At the 2025 World Boxing Championships, he won 4 fights, reaching the final and securing a silver medal. In the final, he suffered bleeding in the second round and as a result, the judges decided to end the fight in favor of his opponent.
