= Mohammad Hussamuddin =

Indian boxer (born 1994)

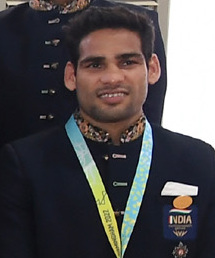
- Hussamuddin in August 2022

Personal information
- Nationality: Indian
- Born: 12 February 1994 (age 32) Nizamabad, India
- Height: 1.67 m (5 ft 6 in)
- Weight: 56 kg (123 lb)

Sport
- Sport: Boxing
- Weight class: Bantamweight
- Coached by: Md Samsamuddin
Medal record
Men's amateur boxing
Representing India
World Championships
Bronze medal – third place	2023 Tashkent	Featherweight
Commonwealth Games
Bronze medal – third place	2018 Gold Coast	Bantamweight
Bronze medal – third place	2022 Birmingham	Featherweight
Asian Championships
Bronze medal – third place	2022 Amman	Featherweight

Mohammad Hussamuddin (born 12 February 1994) is an Indian boxer. He won a bronze medal in the first India International Open boxing championship in New Delhi. He competes in 56 kilogram category. Hussamuddin won Bronze at the 2018 Commonwealth Games held at Gold Coast in Queensland, Australia. In the 2022 Birmingham Commonwealth Games, he claimed the bronze medal in the Men's 57 kg Featherweight category

== Life ==
He was born in Nizamabad, Telangana to boxer, Samsamuddin. His father and brothers, Ahteshamuddin and Aitesamuddin, represented India at international boxing events.

== Awards ==
Hussamuddin has been awarded the Arjuna Award for the year 2023 in recognition of his outstanding achievements in the sport of boxing.
