= Rugby sevens at the 2011 Pan American Games =

- Venue: Tlaquepaque Stadium
- Dates: October 29 – October 30
- Competitors: 96 from 8 nations

Medalists
Gold medal	Canada
Silver medal	Argentina
Bronze medal	United States

Rugby sevens at the 2011 Pan American Games was held in Guadalajara from October 29 to October 30 at the Tlaquepaque Stadium. This was the first appearance for rugby sevens at the Pan American Games. The sport is one of two sports being contested just by men, the other being baseball.

== Medal summary ==
=== Medal table ===
Rank	Nation	Gold	Silver	Bronze	Total
1	Canada	1	0	0	1
2	Argentina	0	1	0	1
3	United States	0	0	1	1
Totals (3 entries)		1	1	1	3

=== Medalists ===
Event	Gold	Silver	Bronze
Men's rugby sevens	Canada; Nanyak Dala; Sean Duke; Matt Evans; Sean White; Ciaran Hearn; Nathan Hirayama; Tyler Ardron; Phil Mack; John Moonlight; Taylor Paris; Mike Scholz; Conor Trainor	Argentina; Gabriel Ascarate; Santiago Bottini; Nicolas Bruzzone; Francisco Cuneo; Manuel Gutierrez; Joaquin Luccheti; Jose Merello; Manuel Montero; Ramiro Moyano; Hernan Olivari; Javier Ortega Desio; Diego Palma	United States; Mark Bokhoven; Colin Hawley; Rocco Mauer; Folau Niua; Milemoti Pulu; Nu'u Punimata; Blaine Scully; Roland Suniula; Shalom Suniula; Zack Test; Peter Tiberio; Maka Unufe

== Qualification ==
The top 5 ranked teams qualified automatically, along with hosts Mexico and the winners of the North American and South American sevens competition.

Event	Date	Location	Vacancies	Qualified
Host Nation	–	–	1	Mexico
Seeded by ranking.			5	Argentina; Canada; Chile; United States; Uruguay
2010 NACRA Men's Sevens tournament	July 29–30, 2010	(Guyana) Georgetown	1	Guyana
2011 CONSUR Sevens tournament	February 5–6, 2011	(Brazil) Bento Gonçalves	1	Brazil
TOTAL			8	

== Venue ==
The rugby sevens competition will be held at the newly built Tlaquepaque Stadium. The stadium can hold about 1,300 people.

== Preliminary round ==
All times are Central Daylight Time (UTC-5)

=== Group A ===
Team	Pld	W	D	L	PF	PA	PD	Pts
Argentina	3	3	0	0	92	15	+77	12
Uruguay	3	2	0	1	52	26	+26	9
Guyana	3	1	0	2	12	65	−53	6
Mexico	3	0	0	3	10	60	−50	3

October 29, 2011
11:50

Argentina	26 – 5	Mexico
	Report

Tlaquepaque Stadium, Guadalajara

October 29, 2011
12:15

Uruguay	20 – 0	Guyana
	Report

Tlaquepaque Stadium, Guadalajara

October 29, 2011
14:00

Argentina	40 – 0	Guyana
	Report

Tlaquepaque Stadium, Guadalajara

October 29, 2011
14:25

Uruguay	22 – 0	Mexico
	Report

Tlaquepaque Stadium, Guadalajara

October 29, 2011
16:05

Argentina	26 – 10	Uruguay
	Report

Tlaquepaque Stadium, Guadalajara

October 29, 2011
16:30

Guyana	12 – 5	Mexico
	Report

Tlaquepaque Stadium, Guadalajara

=== Group B ===
Team	Pld	W	D	L	PF	PA	PD	Pts
Canada	3	3	0	0	109	28	+81	12
United States	3	1	1	1	54	55	−1	7
Brazil	3	1	1	1	33	71	−38	7
Chile	3	0	0	3	21	63	−42	3

October 29, 2011
11:00

United States	14 – 7	Chile
Tries: Unufe, Mauer; Con: Niua (2/2)	Report	Tries: Ianiszeswcki; Con: Herrera (1/1)

Tlaquepaque Stadium, Guadalajara

October 29, 2011
11:25

Canada	45 – 0	Brazil
	Report

Tlaquepaque Stadium, Guadalajara

October 29, 2011
13:10

United States	19 – 19	Brazil
Tries: Unufe (2), Pulu; Con: Niua (2/3)	Report	Tries: Portugal, Cogliandro, Silva; Con: Duque (2/3)

Tlaquepaque Stadium, Guadalajara

October 29, 2011
13:35

Canada	35 – 7	Chile
	Report

Tlaquepaque Stadium, Guadalajara

October 29, 2011
15:15

United States	21 – 29	Canada
Tries: Bokhoven, Pulu, Niua; Con: Niua (3/3)	Report	Tries: Dala, Duke (2), Mack, Hearn; Con: Hirayama (2/5)

Tlaquepaque Stadium, Guadalajara

October 29, 2011
15:40

Brazil	14 – 7	Chile
	Report

Tlaquepaque Stadium, Guadalajara

== Elimination stage ==
Quarter-finals
October 30 9:30 — Guadalajara
Argentina	21
Chile	5
October 30 9:25 — Guadalajara
Brazil	0
Uruguay	7
October 30 9:50 — Guadalajara
Guyana	12
United States	24
October 30 10:15 — Guadalajara
Canada	45
Mexico	0

Semi-finals
October 30 12:00 — Guadalajara
Argentina	17
Uruguay	5
October 30 12:25 — Guadalajara
United States	19
Canada	21

Final
October 30 15:00 — Guadalajara
Argentina	24
Canada	26
Third place
October 30 14:30 — Guadalajara
Uruguay	17
United States	19

=== Quarterfinals ===
October 30, 2011
9:00

Argentina	21 – 5	Chile
	Report

Tlaquepaque Stadium, Guadalajara

October 30, 2011
9:25

Brazil	0 – 7	Uruguay
	Report

Tlaquepaque Stadium, Guadalajara

October 30, 2011
9:50

Guyana	12 – 24	United States
Tries:McKenzie, Gonsalves; Cons:Gonsalves (1/2)	Report	Tries:Scully, Niua (2), Mauer; Cons:Niua (2/4)

Tlaquepaque Stadium, Guadalajara

October 30, 2011
10:15

Canada	45 – 0	Mexico
	Report

Tlaquepaque Stadium, Guadalajara

=== Fifth to eighth place ===
October 30, 2011
11:10

Chile	19 – 14	Brazil
	Report

Tlaquepaque Stadium, Guadalajara

October 30, 2011
11:35

Guyana	7 – 14	Mexico
	Report

Tlaquepaque Stadium, Guadalajara

=== Seventh place match ===
October 30, 2011
13:30

Brazil	26 – 7	Guyana
	Report

Tlaquepaque Stadium, Guadalajara

=== Fifth place match ===
October 30, 2011
13:55

Chile	22 – 0	Mexico
	Report

Tlaquepaque Stadium, Guadalajara

=== Semifinals ===
October 30, 2011
12:00

Argentina	17 – 5	Uruguay
	Report

Tlaquepaque Stadium, Guadalajara

October 30, 2011
12:25

United States	19 – 21	Canada
Tries: Scully, Unufe, Suniula; Cons: Niua (2/3)	Report	Tries: Duke, Mack, Hearn; Cons: Hirayama (3/3)

Tlaquepaque Stadium, Guadalajara

=== Bronze medal match ===
October 30, 2011
14:30

Uruguay	17 – 19	United States
Tries: Ormaechea (2); Cons: Berchesi (1/2)	Report	Tries: Pulu, Punimata, Unufe; Cons: Niua (2/2)

Tlaquepaque Stadium, Guadalajara

=== Gold medal match ===
October 30, 2011
15:00

Argentina	24 – 26	Canada
	Report

Tlaquepaque Stadium, Guadalajara

2011 Pan American Games champion

Canada
1st title

== Final standings ==
Rank	Team	Record
Gold medal	Canada	6 – 0 – 0
Silver medal	Argentina	5 – 0 – 1
Bronze medal	United States	3 – 1 – 2
4	Uruguay	3 – 0 – 3
5	Chile	2 – 0 – 4
6	Mexico	1 – 0 – 5
7	Brazil	2 – 1 – 3
8	Guyana	1 – 0 – 5

== See also ==
- Rugby sevens at the Pan American Games
