= Saidel Horta =

Cuban boxer

Personal information
- Nationality: Cuba

Boxing career
Medal record
Men's amateur boxing
Representing Cuba
World Championships
Silver medal – second place	2023 Tashkent	Featherweight
Pan American Games
Silver medal – second place	2023 Santiago	57 kg

Saidel Horta is a Cuban boxer. He competed at the 2023 IBA Men's World Boxing Championships, winning the silver medal in the featherweight event. He also competed at the 2023 Pan American Games, winning the silver medal in the men's 57 kg event.
