= Shunsuke Kitamoto =

Japanese boxer (born 2000)

Personal information
- Nationality: Japan
- Born: February 29, 2000 (age 26)

Boxing career
Medal record
Men's amateur boxing
Representing Japan
World Championships
Bronze medal – third place	2025 Liverpool	60 kg
Asian Games
Bronze medal – third place	2026 Aichi–Nagoya	60 kg

Shunsuke Kitamoto (北本隼輔, Kitamoto Shunsuke; born February 29, 2000) is a Japanese boxer. He competed at the 2025 World Boxing Championships, winning a bronze medal in the men's 60 kg event. He is also a bronze medalist at the Asian Games.

== Amateur career ==
At Stage II of the 2025 World Boxing Cup, Kitamoto defeated Serik Temirzhanov in the quarterfinals. He then lost to Gantömöriin Lundaa in the semifinals, thus winning a bronze medal.

Kitamoto competed in the men's 60 kg category of the 2025 World Boxing Championships held in Liverpool, England. He defeated Enrique Kakulov in the round of 32, Lounes Kamraoui in the round of 16 and Keoma Ali Al-Ahmadieh in the quarterfinals, all by unanimous decision. He faced Abdumalik Khalokov in the semifinals and lost by unanimous decision, winning a bronze medal.

Kitamoto competed in the men's 60 kg category of the 2026 Asian Games held in Nishio, Aichi, Japan. He defeated Mohammed Sattar Saleh in the round of 16 and Sachin Siwach in the quarterfinals. He then faced Khalokov in the semifinals, where he lost the match and won a bronze medal.
