= Davron Gafurov =

Boxing trainer

Personal information
- Nationality: Uzbek
- Born: 4 August 1981 (age 44) Tashkent Region
- Height: 177 cm (5 ft 10 in)
- Weight: Lightheavyweight

Boxing career

Davron Gafurov (Uzbek: G'ofurov Davron: ru:Гафуров, Даврон Дилмурадович born August 4, 1981, Tashkent region, Uzbek SSR) is an Uzbek boxing coach, a former amateur boxer who competed in the light heavyweight category. In 2023, he was awarded the title of Honored Coach of the Republic of Uzbekistan. He trains Paris-2024 Olympic Gold medalist in Featherweight category Abdumalik Khalokov.

== Biography ==
Davron Gafurov was born in 1981 in the Zangiata district of Tashkent region, Uzbekistan. He developed a passion for combat sports at a young age, starting his training in kickboxing and boxing when he was 15 years old. He won otitle of Uzbekistan Youth Championships in 2010. Gafurov gained recognition beyond his home country, and in 2011 he took first place at a major tournament in Atyrau, Kazakhstan. His achievements earned him title of International Master of Sports.

=== Coaching career ===
In 2015, Gafurov transitioned from competing to coaching, beginning his journey as a boxing coach at the Uzbekistan Boxing Federation. His expertise and mentorship have been pivotal in shaping the careers of his athletes, most notably Abdumalik Khalokov. Under Gafurov’s guidance, Khalokov has become a world champion in both adult and youth categories and securing the gold medal at the 2018 Youth Olympics and Paris 2024 Olympic Games. Since 2018, Gafurov has also served as one of the national team coaches.

== Awards ==
- In December 2023, he was awarded the title of "Honored Sports coach of Uzbekistan".
- 2 star coach of IBA (International Boxing Association).
- International Master of sports in boxing.
