= Susanne Dandenault =

Canadian weightlifter

- Citizenship: Canada
- Occupations: Lawyer; Weightlifter
- Known for: Canadian records for clean and jerk and snatch

Susanne Dandenault is a Canadian lawyer and former weightlifter. She holds Canadian records for clean and jerk and snatch.

== Biography ==
Dandenault grew up in Manitoba, attending Glenlawn Collegiate. She attended the University of Washington on a track and field scholarship, majoring in psychology and environmental studies. She went on to get her law degree from the University of Manitoba.

Dandenault graduated from law school in 1996. She then competed as a weightlifter, including on the Canadian team from 1998 to 2005. She competed in five World Championships, two Pan American Games, a Commonwealth Games and was an alternate at the 2004 Summer Olympics. She is a nine-time national champion (1997–2005). She still holds several Canadian records.

Dandenault returned to working in law in 2005.

In 2019, Dandenaut was inducted into the Manitoba Sports Hall of Fame.

In 2023, Dandenault became the chair of Sports Manitoba, a two-year position, the first woman to chair the board.
