= Catherine Breed =

American open-water swimmer (born 1993

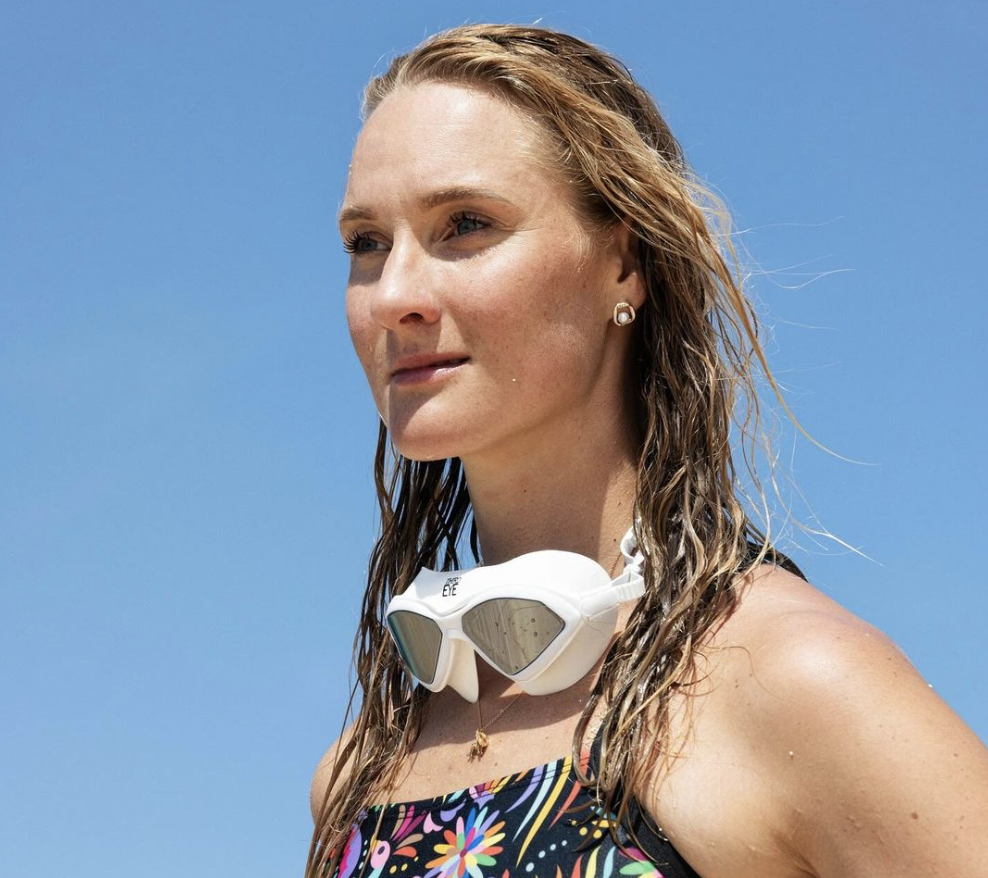
- Breed in 2024

Personal information
- Born: March 22, 1993 (age 33)
- Height: 6 ft 0 in (183 cm)
- Website: https://www.catherinebreed.com/

Sport
- Sport: Swimming
- Strokes: Freestyle
Medal record
Representing United States
Women's swimming
Pan American Games
Gold medal – first place	2011 Guadalajara	200 m freestyle
Gold medal – first place	2011 Guadalajara	4x200 m freestyle

Catherine Breed (born March 22, 1993) is an American open-water swimmer.

== Career ==
Breed swam at Amador Valley High School in Pleasanton, California from 2007 to 2011, earning 21 All-American honors over four years. She was a collegiate swimmer at the University of California, Berkeley, where she primarily swam freestyle.

After graduating in 2015, Breed joined the Dolphin Club of San Francisco. In 2017, she swam the length of Lake Tahoe in 8 hours and 56 minutes, breaking a record set in 1987. She has completed marathon swims of the English Channel, the North Channel, and the 20 Bridges Swim (a 30 mile circumnavigation of Manhattan).

In 2023, Breed became the first person to swim from the Golden Gate Bridge to Half Moon Bay, covering 27 miles.

In 2026, she announced a plan to become the first person to swim the entire length of California, covering 900 miles of the Pacific coast from north to south. Beginning on July 1, 2026, she was supported by a team of four following in a sailboat and swam about 10 miles per day for 111 days, successfully completing the journey on October 19. Breed and her team had been planning the attempt since 2023.

== Interview about the Californian Swim ==
Anna FitzGerald Guth, a known Science and climate reporter, interviewed Catherine Breed about her 900 mile swim along the Californian coast. She expressed her feelings about the current state of the ocean and how it has affected her swim, “Essentially, raw sewage comes out of the river and spills into the ocean. The pollution zone is about 1.5 miles offshore, so I’ll be finishing around 3 miles offshore, crossing the border at sea. That’s why no one’s gonna see me finish.”(Breed KPBS interview). Near the end of her swim, she faced multiple challenges starting with storms, waves, shark sightings, and ending with the raw sewage and the need to take antibiotic pills to stay healthy. Her interview was streamed all across platforms including: Youtube, ABC News, Good morning ect. Her grand success was celebrated by people all over the world.

== Personal life ==
Breed studied integrative biology at the University of California, Berkeley, graduating in 2015. She planned to attend medical school before switching to focus on open-water swimming. She previously worked at Intuitive Surgical, an American biotechnology company.
