= Guyana at the 2003 Pan American Games =

- IOC code: GUY
- NOC: Guyana Olympic Association
- Website: www.olympic.org/guyana

in Santo Domingo 1–17 August 2003
- Flag bearer: Aliann Pompey
- Medals Ranked 22nd: Gold 0 Silver 1 Bronze 1 Total 2

Pan American Games appearances (overview)
- 1959; 1963; 1967; 1971; 1975; 1979; 1983; 1987; 1991; 1995; 1999; 2003; 2007; 2011; 2015; 2019; 2023

The 14th Pan American Games were held in Santo Domingo, Dominican Republic from August 1 to August 17, 2003.

== Medals ==
=== Silver ===
===== Athletics =====
- Women's 800 metres: Marian Burnett

=== Bronze ===
===== Athletics =====
- Women's 400 metres: Aliann Pompey

== Results by event ==
=== Boxing ===
Athlete	Event	Round of 16	Quarterfinals	Semifinals	Final
Athlete	Event	Opposition Result	Opposition Result	Opposition Result	Opposition Result
Rayon O'Neil	Middleweight	Almonte (PUR); L 10-18	did not advance		

=== Swimming ===
==== Men's Competition ====
Athlete	Event	Heat		Final	
Athlete	Event	Time	Rank	Time	Rank
Onan Thom	50 m freestyle	24.83	28	did not advance	
Onan Thom	100 m freestyle	54.14	31	did not advance	
Onan Thom	100 m breaststroke	1:10.78	20	did not advance	

== See also ==
- Guyana at the 2004 Summer Olympics
