= Swimming at the 2011 Pan American Games – Women's 200 metre freestyle =

Women's 200 metre freestyle at the 2011 Pan American Games
- Venue: Scotiabank Aquatics Center
- Date: October 16
- Competitors: 14 from 10 nations

Medalists
Gold medal	Catherine Breed	United States
Silver medal	Chelsea Nauta	United States
Bronze medal	Andreina Pinto	Venezuela

The Women's 200 metre freestyle swimming event at the 2011 Pan American Games was swum October 16, 2011, in Guadalajara, Mexico. The defending Pan American Games champion was Ava Ohlgren of the United States.

The race consisted of four lengths of the pool, freestyle.

== Records ==
Prior to this competition, the existing world and Pan American Games records were as follows:

World record	Federica Pellegrini (ITA)	1:52.98	Rome, Italy	July 29, 2009
Games Record	Cynthia Woodhead (USA)	1:58.43	San Juan, Puerto Rico	July 3, 1979

== Results ==
All times are in minutes and seconds.

KEY:	q	Fastest non-qualifiers	Q	Qualified	NR	National record	PB	Personal best	SB	Seasonal best

=== Heats ===
The first round was held on October 16.

Rank	Heat	Lane	Name	Nationality	Time	Notes
1	2	4	Catherine Breed	United States	2:00.81	QA
2	2	5	Liliana Ibáñez	Mexico	2:01.15	QA NR
3	1	4	Chelsea Nauta	United States	2:01.81	QA
4	2	3	Andreina Pinto	Venezuela	2:03.15	QA
5	2	6	Yanel Pinto	Venezuela	2:04.38	QA
6	1	6	Jéssica Cavalheiro	Brazil	2:04.79	QA
7	2	7	Jennifer Beckberger	Canada	2:05.17	QA
8	1	5	Tatiana Barbosa	Brazil	2:05.86	QA
9	1	2	Virginia Bardach	Argentina	2:05.99	QB
10	2	2	Alexia Benitez	El Salvador	2:07.30	QB
11	2	1	Andrea Cedron	Peru	2:08.36	QB
12	1	3	Paige Schultz	Canada	2:09.25	QB
13	1	7	Daniela Reyes	Chile	2:13.73	QB
14	1	1	Britany van Lange	Guyana	2:20.21	QB

=== B Final ===
The B final was also held on October 16.

Rank	Lane	Name	Nationality	Time	Notes
9	6	Paige Schultz	Canada	2:04.96	
10	4	Virginia Bardach	Argentina	2:05.35	
11	5	Alexia Benitez	El Salvador	2:06.15	
12	3	Andrea Cedron	Peru	2:06.81	
13	2	Daniela Reyes	Chile	2:15.07	
14	7	Britany van Lange	Guyana	DNS	

=== A Final ===
The A final was also held on October 16.

Rank	Lane	Name	Nationality	Time	Notes
1st place, gold medalist(s)	4	Catherine Breed	United States	2:00.08	
2nd place, silver medalist(s)	3	Chelsea Nauta	United States	2:00.62	
3rd place, bronze medalist(s)	6	Andreina Pinto	Venezuela	2:00.79	
4	5	Liliana Ibáñez	Mexico	2:02.90	
5	2	Yanel Pinto	Venezuela	2:03.92	
6	7	Jéssica Cavalheiro	Brazil	2:04.13	
7	8	Tatiana Barbosa	Brazil	2:04.20	
8	1	Jennifer Beckberger	Canada	2:04.72	
