= 2025 World Boxing Championships – Men's 60 kg =

Competition at amateur boxing tournament

Men's 60 kg at the 2025 World Boxing Championships
- Venue: Liverpool Arena
- Location: Liverpool, England
- Dates: 4–14 September
- Competitors: 43 from 43 nations

Medalists
gold medal	Abdumalik Khalokov	Uzbekistan
silver medal	Luiz Gabriel Oliveira	Brazil
bronze medal	Shunsuke Kitamoto	Japan
bronze medal	Radoslav Rosenov	Bulgaria

The Men's 60 kg competition at the 2025 World Boxing Championships was held from 4 to 14 September 2025.

== Results ==
=== Finals ===
Semifinals; 12 September
Abdumalik Khalokov (UZB)	5
Shunsuke Kitamoto (JPN)	0
Luiz Gabriel Oliveira (BRA)	4
Radoslav Rosenov (BUL)	1

Final; 14 September
Abdumalik Khalokov (UZB)	5
Luiz Gabriel Oliveira (BRA)	0

=== Top half ===
==== Section 1 ====
Preliminaries; 4 September
Xu Jiasheng (CHN)	0
Mehmethan Çınar (TUR)	5
Junmilardo Ogayre (PHI)	5
Lai Chu-en (TPE)	0
Adam Hession (IRL)	1
Jacob Cassar (AUS)	4

Round of 32; 6 September
Abdumalik Khalokov (UZB)	5
Mehmethan Çınar (TUR)	0
Giuseppe Canonico (ITA)	5
Thamer Al-Matrfi (KSA)	0
Biibars Zhexen (KAZ)	5
Junmilardo Ogayre (PHI)	0
Jacob Cassar (AUS)	0
Sachin Siwach (IND)	5

Round of 16; 8 September
Abdumalik Khalokov (UZB)	5
Giuseppe Canonico (ITA)	0
Biibars Zhexen (KAZ)	4
Sachin Siwach (IND)	1

Quarter-finals; 10 September
Abdumalik Khalokov (UZB)	5
Biibars Zhexen (KAZ)	0

==== Section 2 ====
Preliminaries; 4 September
Enrique Kakulov (ESP)	3
Muhamed Al-Bayati (DEN)	2
Edgaras Skurdelis (LTU)	1
Artyush Gomtsyan (GEO)	4

Round of 32; 6 September
Shunsuke Kitamoto (JPN)	5
Enrique Kakulov (ESP)	0
Jone Davule (FIJ)	0
Lounes Kamraoui (FRA)	5
Mohammad Abu Jajeh (JOR)	0
Keoma Ali Al-Ahmadieh (CAN)	5
Artyush Gomtsyan (GEO)	0
Gantömöriin Lundaa (MGL)	5

Round of 16; 8 September
Shunsuke Kitamoto (JPN)	5
Lounes Kamraoui (FRA)	0
Keoma Ali Al-Ahmadieh (CAN)	5
Gantömöriin Lundaa (MGL)	0

Quarter-finals; 10 September
Shunsuke Kitamoto (JPN)	5
Keoma Ali Al-Ahmadieh (CAN)	0

=== Bottom half ===
==== Section 3 ====
Preliminaries; 4 September
Ramon Ordonez (USA)	5
Kevin Davila (MEX)	0
Vide Prkačin (CRO)	0
Luis Enrique Vinet (CUB)	5
Dettori Brown-Hodge (JAM)	0
Johan Aguero (DOM)	5

Round of 32; 6 September
Luiz Gabriel Oliveira (BRA)	5
Ramon Ordonez (USA)	0
Tomislav Đinović (MNE)	2
Mahmoud Al Chabtun (NED)	3
Kruzító Kovács (HUN)	3
Luis Enrique Vinet (CUB)	2
Johan Aguero (DOM)	0
Paweł Brach (POL)	5

Round of 16; 8 September
Luiz Gabriel Oliveira (BRA)	5
Mahmoud Al Chabtun (NED)	0
Kruzító Kovács (HUN)	0
Paweł Brach (POL)	5

Quarter-finals; 10 September
Luiz Gabriel Oliveira (BRA)	5
Paweł Brach (POL)	0

==== Section 4 ====
Preliminaries; 4 September
Radoslav Rosenov (BUL)	5
Döwlet Muhanow (TKM)	0
Aider Abduraimov (UKR)	3
Owain Harris-Allen (WAL)	2
Nikolai Tsaskin (EST)	0
Ani Haxhillari (ALB)	5

Round of 32; 6 September
Mahammadali Gasimzada (AZE)	1
Radoslav Rosenov (BUL)	4
Aider Abduraimov (UKR)	3
Jang Dong-hwan (KOR)	2
Mustafa Akraa (SYR)	0
William Hewitt (ENG)	5
Ani Haxhillari (ALB)	1
Munarbek Seitbek Uulu (KGZ)	4

Round of 16; 8 September
Radoslav Rosenov (BUL)	5
Aider Abduraimov (UKR)	0
William Hewitt (ENG)	3
Munarbek Seitbek Uulu (KGZ)	2

Quarter-finals; 10 September
Radoslav Rosenov (BUL)	5
William Hewitt (ENG)	0
