= Maude Charron =

Canadian weightlifter (born 1993)

Personal information
- Full name: Maude G. Charron
- Born: 28 April 1993 (age 33) Rimouski, Quebec, Canada
- Height: 155 cm (5 ft 1 in)
- Weight: 63 kg (139 lb)

Sport
- Country: Canada
- Sport: Weightlifting
- Weight class: 64 kg
- Team: Team Canada
- Coached by: Spencer Arnold

Achievements and titles
- Personal bests: Snatch 107kg NR Cl&Jerk 133kg Total 240kg NR
Medal record
Women's Weightlifting
Representing Canada
Olympic Games
| Gold medal – first place | 2020 Tokyo | –64 kg |
| Silver medal – second place | 2024 Paris | –59 kg |
World Championships
| Silver medal – second place | 2025 Førde | –63 kg |
| Bronze medal – third place | 2022 Bogotá | –59 kg |
Commonwealth Games
| Gold medal – first place | 2018 Gold Coast | 63 kg |
| Gold medal – first place | 2022 Birmingham | 64 kg |
| Gold medal – first place | 2026 Glasgow | 63 kg |
Pan American Games
| Silver medal – second place | 2023 Santiago | 59 kg |
IWF World Cup
| Silver medal – second place | 2020 Rome | –64 kg |
Pan American Championships
| Gold medal – first place | 2021 Santo Domingo | –64 kg |
| Gold medal – first place | 2023 Bariloche | –59 kg |
| Bronze medal – third place | 2017 Miami | –63 kg |
FISU World University Championships
| Gold medal – first place | 2018 Poland | –64 kg |
| Bronze medal – third place | 2016 Merida | –63 kg |

Maude G. Charron (born 28 April 1993) is a Canadian weightlifter, who competes in the 63/64 kg category and represents Canada at international competitions. She is an Olympic and Commonwealth Games champion in the women's 64 kg division. Charron also owns the clean & jerk Commonwealth Games record, the snatch and total Canadian weightlifting records, all the Panamerican records in her weight class.

== Career ==
Charron won the silver medal in the snatch at the 2017 World Weightlifting Championships.

She continued her international weightlifting at the 2018 Commonwealth Games in Australia. There she lifted a Commonwealth Games record when she lifted 122 kilograms (269 lb) in the clean and jerk on the way to the gold medal. This record beat compatriot Christine Girard's record from the 2006 Commonwealth Games by 1 kg.

In her buildup to the 2020 Summer Olympics Charron competed at the 2020 Pan American Weightlifting Championships which were held in 2021 as a result of the COVID-19 pandemic. She had a very successful competition in Santo Domingo on her way to gold setting personal bests and a Panamerican Record in all of the snatch, clean & jerk, and total lifted categories. Charron won the gold medal in 64 kg division at the 2020 Summer Olympics in Tokyo with a 105 kg snatch and 131 kg clean and jerk, for a total of 236 kg. Following her victory she dedicated her gold medal win to fellow Canadian Olympic champion Christine Girard, who had only received her gold six years after the 2012 Summer Olympics after the other two athletes in front of her were disqualified.

Charron joined the Canadian team for the 2022 Commonwealth Games in Birmingham, and was named as co-flagbearer for the opening ceremony alongside wheelchair racer Josh Cassidy. She noted her excitement at her family being able to attend, which had not been the case at the Olympics due to the pandemic. Charron mounted a successful title defence in Birmingham.

In December 2022, she won the bronze medal in the women's 59 kg event at the World Weightlifting Championships held in Bogotá, Colombia. In that same month, she was also elected as member of the IWF Athletes' Commission.

Charron won the gold medal in her event at the 2023 Pan American Weightlifting Championships held in Bariloche, Argentina. She also won the gold medal in the Snatch and Clean & Jerk events.

Named to her second Canadian Olympic team for the 2024 Summer Olympics in Paris, Charron was named Canada's co-flagbearer for the opening ceremonies, alongside sprinter Andre De Grasse. She won the silver medal in the women's 59 kg event.

At the 2026 Commonwealth Games in Glasgow, Scotland, Charron won her third consecutive gold medal at the event, taking first place in the women's 63 kg competition.

== Major results ==
| Year | Venue | Weight | Snatch (kg) | | | | Clean and jerk (kg) | | | | Total | Rank |
| Year | Venue | Weight | 1 | 2 | 3 | Rank | 1 | 2 | 3 | Rank | Total | Rank |
Olympic Games
| 2021 | Tokyo, Japan | 64 kg | 102 | 105 | ~~108~~ | —N/a | ~~128~~ | 128 | 131 | —N/a | 236 | 1st place, gold medalist(s) |
| 2024 | Paris, France | 59 kg | 101 | 104 | 106 | —N/a | 126 | 130 | ~~132~~ | —N/a | 236 | 2nd place, silver medalist(s) |
World Championships
| 2017 | Anaheim, United States | 63 kg | 95 | 99 | 102 | 2nd place, silver medalist(s) | 118 | ~~122~~ | 122 | 5 | 224 | 5 |
| 2018 | Ashgabat, Turkmenistan | 64 kg | ~~97~~ | ~~97~~ | 97 | 11 | 120 | ~~123~~ | 123 | 9 | 220 | 10 |
| 2019 | Pattaya, Thailand | 64 kg | 100 | 103 | ~~106~~ | 6 | 123 | 127 | ~~130~~ | 5 | 230 | 6 |
| 2022 | Bogotá, Colombia | 59 kg | ~~100~~ | 100 | 103 | 2nd place, silver medalist(s) | 123 | ~~127~~ | 128 | 4 | 231 | 3rd place, bronze medalist(s) |
| 2023 | Riyadh, Saudi Arabia | 59 kg | — | — | — | — | — | — | — | — | — | — |
| 2025 | Førde, Norway | 63 kg | 99 | ~~103~~ | 103 | 3rd place, bronze medalist(s) | 128 | 131 | 133 | 2nd place, silver medalist(s) | 236 | 2nd place, silver medalist(s) |
IWF World Cup
| 2020 | Rome, Italy | 64 kg | ~~101~~ | 101 | 105 | 2nd place, silver medalist(s) | 126 | ~~130~~ | 130 | 2nd place, silver medalist(s) | 235 | 2nd place, silver medalist(s) |
| 2024 | Phuket, Thailand | 59 kg | 100 | 103 | 106 | 3rd place, bronze medalist(s) | 125 | ~~129~~ | 130 | 5 | 236 | 3rd place, bronze medalist(s) |
Pan American Games
| 2019 | Lima, Peru | 64 kg | ~~97~~ | 97 | 101 | —N/a | ~~123~~ | 123 | ~~128~~ | —N/a | 224 | 4 |
| 2023 | Santiago, Chile | 59 kg | 95 | 99 | 101 | —N/a | 115 | 120 | 125 | —N/a | 226 | 2nd place, silver medalist(s) |
Pan American Championships
| 2017 | Miami, United States | 63 kg | ~~90~~ | 90 | 93 | 3rd place, bronze medalist(s) | 115 | 118 | 122 | 4 | 215 | 3rd place, bronze medalist(s) |
| 2018 | Santo Domingo, Dominican Republic | 63 kg | 95 | ~~98~~ | ~~99~~ | 6 | 117 | 120 | 123 | 5 | 218 | 5 |
| 2019 | Guatemala City, Guatemala | 64 kg | ~~97~~ | 97 | 101 | 3rd place, bronze medalist(s) | 121 | 125 | ~~128~~ | 3rd place, bronze medalist(s) | 226 | 4 |
| 2021 | Guayaquil, Ecuador | 64 kg | 100 | 104 | 107 | 1st place, gold medalist(s) | 125 | 129 | 133 | 1st place, gold medalist(s) | 240 | 1st place, gold medalist(s) |
| 2023 | Bariloche, Argentina | 59 kg | 98 | 101 | ~~104~~ | 1st place, gold medalist(s) | ~~124~~ | 124 | ~~127~~ | 1st place, gold medalist(s) | 225 | 1st place, gold medalist(s) |

Olympic Games
| Preceded by Marie-Philip Poulin; Charles Hamelin | Flagbearer for Canada; Paris 2024 (with Andre De Grasse) | Succeeded by Marielle Thompson; Mikaël Kingsbury |
