= Guyana at the 1999 Pan American Games =

- IOC code: GUY
- NOC: Guyana Olympic Association
- Website: www.olympic.org/guyana

in Winnipeg 23 July – 8 August 1999
- Medals Ranked 28th: Gold 0 Silver 0 Bronze 0 Total 0

Pan American Games appearances (overview)
- 1959; 1963; 1967; 1971; 1975; 1979; 1983; 1987; 1991; 1995; 1999; 2003; 2007; 2011; 2015; 2019; 2023; 2027

The 13th Pan American Games were held in Winnipeg, Manitoba, Canada from July 23 to August 8, 1999.

== See also ==
- Guyana at the 2000 Summer Olympics
