= Weightlifting at the 2023 Pan American Games – Women's 59 kg =

Weightlifting – Women's 59kg at the 2023 Pan American Games
- Venue: Gimnasio Chimkowe
- Dates: 22 October
- Competitors: 17 from 16 nations

Medalists
Gold medal	Yenny Álvarez	Colombia
Silver medal	Maude Charron	Canada
Bronze medal	Anyelin Venegas	Venezuela

The women's 59 kg competition of the weightlifting events at the 2023 Pan American Games in Santiago, Chile, was held on 22 October at the Gimnasio Chimkowe.

Each lifter performed in both the snatch and clean and jerk lifts, with the final score being the sum of the lifter's best result in each. The athlete received three attempts in each of the two lifts; the score for the lift was the heaviest weight successfully lifted. This weightlifting event was limited to competitors with a maximum of 59 kilograms of body mass.

== Results ==
The results were as follows:

Rank	Athlete	Nation	Group	Snatch (kg)				Clean & Jerk (kg)				Total
Rank	Athlete	Nation	Group	1	2	3	Result	1	2	3	Result	Total
1st place, gold medalist(s)	Yenny Álvarez	Colombia	A	97	100	102	102	~~126~~	126	~~134~~	126	228
2nd place, silver medalist(s)	Maude Charron	Canada	A	95	99	101	101	115	120	125	125	226
3rd place, bronze medalist(s)	Anyelin Venegas	Venezuela	A	95	98	100	100	122	~~125~~	~~127~~	122	222
4	Janeth Gómez	Mexico	A	93	96	99	99	120	123	~~125~~	123	222
5	Concepción Úsuga	Colombia	A	92	96	99	99	110	115	120	120	219
6	Taylor Wilkins	United States	A	88	92	95	95	115	~~120~~	~~125~~	115	210
7	Jenifer Becerra	Ecuador	A	88	92	~~94~~	92	109	113	115	115	207
8	Eduarda Souza	Brazil	A	~~90~~	~~90~~	90	90	110	115	–	115	205
9	Victória Alvarado	El Salvador	A	76	~~80~~	~~81~~	76	93	98	~~101~~	101	174
10	Javiana Pavón	Nicaragua	A	75	~~80~~	~~80~~	75	~~90~~	90	97	97	172
11	Sofía Ramírez	Costa Rica	A	~~70~~	~~70~~	70	70	92	97	~~102~~	97	167
12	Violeta Fernández	Paraguay	A	73	76	~~79~~	76	~~87~~	87	~~93~~	87	163
13	Analí Saldarriaga	Peru	A	65	68	~~70~~	68	84	87	~~89~~	87	155
14	Katherine González	Uruguay	A	61	65	67	67	75	78	81	81	148
15	Krystol Chanderban	Guyana	A	60	65	~~67~~	65	75	78	~~80~~	78	143
	María Casadevall	Argentina	A	~~87~~	~~87~~	~~87~~	–					DNS
	Sofía Alemán	Honduras	A	78	~~81~~	~~83~~	–	~~93~~	~~93~~	~~93~~	–	DSQ
