= Guyana at the 1991 Pan American Games =

- IOC code: GUY
- NOC: Guyana Olympic Association
- Website: www.olympic.org/guyana

in Havana 8–18 August 1991
- Medals Ranked 24th: Gold 0 Silver 0 Bronze 2 Total 2

Pan American Games appearances (overview)
- 1959; 1963; 1967; 1971; 1975; 1979; 1983; 1987; 1991; 1995; 1999; 2003; 2007; 2011; 2015; 2019; 2023

The 11th Pan American Games were held in Havana, Cuba from August 2 to August 18, 1991.

== Medals ==
=== Bronze ===
===== Boxing =====
- Men's Flyweight (– 51 kg): Stephan Rose
- Men's Light Heavyweight (– 81 kg): Terrence Poole

== See also ==
- Guyana at the 1992 Summer Olympics
