= Guyana at the 2015 Pan American Games =

- IOC code: GUY
- NOC: Guyana Olympic Association
- Website: www.olympic.org/guyana

in Toronto, Canada 10–26 July 2015
- Competitors: 22 in 5 sports
- Flag bearer (opening): Onika George
- Flag bearer (closing): Priyanna Ramdhani
- Medals: Gold 0 Silver 0 Bronze 0 Total 0

Pan American Games appearances (overview)
- 1959; 1963; 1967; 1971; 1975; 1979; 1983; 1987; 1991; 1995; 1999; 2003; 2007; 2011; 2015; 2019; 2023

Guyana competed in the 2015 Pan American Games in Toronto, Ontario, Canada from July 10 to 26, 2015.

Guyana's team consisted of 22 athletes (19 men and three women) competing in five sports. Swimmer Onika George was the flagbearer for the team during the opening ceremony.

== Competitors ==
The following table lists Guyana's delegation per sport and gender.

Sport	Men	Women	Total
Athletics	2	1	3
Badminton	1	1	2
Rugby sevens	12	0	12
Squash	3	0	3
Swimming	1	1	2
Total	19	3	22

== Athletics ==
Guyana's track and field team consisted of three athletes (two men and one woman).

Key

- Note–Ranks given for track events are for the entire round
- Q = Qualified for the next round
- q = Qualified for the next round as a fastest loser or, in field events, by position without achieving the qualifying target
- DNF = Did not finish
- N/A = Round not applicable for the event

Track events

Athlete	Event	Round 1		Semifinal		Final	
Athlete	Event	Result	Rank	Result	Rank	Result	Rank
Adam Harris	Men's 100 m	DNF		did not advance			
Winston George	Men's 400 m	—N/a		46.39	5 q	45.58	6
Jenea McCammon	Women's 400 m hurdles	—N/a		1:03.21	8	did not advance	

== Badminton ==
Guyana received two quota spots to enter one male and one female.

Athlete	Event	First round	Round of 32	Round of 16	Quarterfinals	Semifinals	Final	Rank
Athlete	Event	Opposition Result	Opposition Result	Opposition Result	Opposition Result	Opposition Result	Opposition Result	Rank
Narayan Ramdhani	Men's singles	Bye	Javier (DOM); L (14–21, 18–21)	did not advance				
Priyanna Ramdhani	Women's singles	Bye	Polanco (DOM); L (5–21, 9–21)	did not advance				
Narayan Ramdhani; Priyanna Ramdhani	Mixed doubles	—N/a	Araya / Chou (CHI); L (14–21, 18–21)	did not advance				

== Rugby sevens ==
Guyana qualified a men's rugby sevens team, after winning the 2014 NACRA Sevens held in December 2014. The team consisted of twelve athletes.

Men's tournament

Guyana announced their squad on July 1, 2015.

- Lancelot Adonis
- Claudius Butts
- Avery Corbin
- Rickford Cummings
- Akeem Fraser
- Ryan Gonsalves
- Phibian Joseph
- Peobo Hamilton
- Patrick King
- Ronald Mayers
- Dwayne Schroeder
- Richard Staglon

Group B

Team	Pld	W	D	L	PF	PA	PD	Pts	Qualification
Argentina	3	3	0	0	81	14	+67	9	Qualified for the quarterfinals
Canada	3	2	0	1	78	35	+43	7	Qualified for the quarterfinals
Brazil	3	1	0	2	52	50	+2	5	Qualified for the quarterfinals
Guyana	3	0	0	3	5	117	−112	3	Qualified for the quarterfinals

11 July 2015
12:17

Canada	45–0	Guyana
	Report

Exhibition Stadium, Toronto

11 July 2015
16:49

Argentina	41–0	Guyana
	Report

Exhibition Stadium, Toronto

11 July 2015
19:33

Brazil	31–5	Guyana
	Report

Exhibition Stadium, Toronto

Fifth through Eighth places

12 July 2015
16:05

Guyana	0–31	Chile
	Report

Exhibition Stadium, Toronto

Seventh place match

12 July 2015
18:50

Guyana	26–22	Mexico
	Report

Exhibition Stadium, Toronto

== Squash ==
Guyana qualified a men's squash team of three athletes.

Singles and Doubles

Athlete	Event	Round of 32	Round of 16	Quarterfinals	Semifinals	Final	
Athlete	Event	Opposition Result	Opposition Result	Opposition Result	Opposition Result	Opposition Result	Rank
Sunil Seth	Men's singles	Mauricio Sedano (GUA); W 3–0	Shawn Delierre (CAN); L 0–3	did not advance			=9
Jason Ray Khalil	Men's singles	Nicolas Caballero (PAR); L 0–3	did not advance				=17
Kristian Jeffrey; Jason Ray Khalil	Men's doubles	—N/a	Andrew Schnell / Graeme Schnell (CAN); L 0–2	did not advance			=9

Team

Athlete	Event	Group Stage				Classification round 1	Classification round 2	
Athlete	Event	Opposition Result	Opposition Result	Opposition Result	Rank	Opposition Result	Opposition Result	Rank
Sunil Seth; Jason Ray Khalil; Kristian Jeffrey	Men's team	Argentina; L 0–3	Mexico; L 1–2	—N/a	3	Chile; L 1–2	Ecuador; L 0–3	10

== Swimming ==
Guyana received two universality spots (one male and one female).

Athlete	Event	Heat		Final	
Athlete	Event	Time	Rank	Time	Rank
Omar Adams	Men's 50 m freestyle	26.58	20	did not advance	
Omar Adams	Men's 100 m freestyle	58.01	23	did not advance	
Omar Adams	Men's 200 m freestyle	2:15.58	21	did not advance	
Onika George	Women's 50 m freestyle	29.03	27	did not advance	
Onika George	Women's 100 m freestyle	1:05.00	28	did not advance	

== See also ==
- Guyana at the 2016 Summer Olympics
