= Guyana at the Pan American Games =

- IOC code: GUY
- NOC: Guyana Olympic Association
- Website: www.olympic.org/guyana
- Medals Ranked 24th: Gold 2 Silver 5 Bronze 14 Total 21

Pan American Games appearances (overview)
- 1959; 1963; 1967; 1971; 1975; 1979; 1983; 1987; 1991; 1995; 1999; 2003; 2007; 2011; 2015; 2019; 2023; 2027

Guyana has competed in sixteen editions of the Pan American Games, accruing eighteen medals.

== Pan American Games ==
=== Medals by games ===
Year	Ref.	Edition	Host city	Rank	Gold	Silver	Bronze	Total
1951		I	(Argentina) Buenos Aires	Did not participate				
1955		II	Mexico City	Did not participate				
1959		III	(United States) Chicago	17th	0	0	3	3
1963		IV	(Brazil) São Paulo	11th	1	0	0	1
1967		V	(Canada) Winnipeg	19th	0	0	1	1
1971		VI	(Colombia) Cali	20th	0	0	1	1
1975		VII	Mexico City	9th	1	1	0	2
1979		VIII	(Puerto Rico) San Juan	13th	0	2	1	3
1983		IX	(Venezuela) Caracas	-	0	0	0	0
1987		X	(United States) Indianapolis	23rd	0	0	1	1
1991		XI	(Cuba) Havana	24th	0	0	2	2
1995		XII	(Argentina) Mar del Plata	-	0	0	0	0
1999		XIII	(Canada) Winnipeg	-	0	0	0	0
2003		XIV	(Dominican Republic) Santo Domingo	21st	0	1	1	2
2007		XV	(Brazil) Rio de Janeiro	25th	0	0	1	1
2011		XVI	(Mexico) Guadalajara	28th	0	0	1	1
2015		XVII	(Canada) Toronto	-	0	0	0	0
2019		XVIII	(Peru) Lima	-	0	0	0	0
2023		XIX	(Chile) Santiago	26th	0	1	2	3
Total				24th	2	5	14	21

=== Medals by sport ===
Sport	Gold	Silver	Bronze	Total
Athletics	1	3	3	7
Weightlifting	1	0	2	3
Boxing	0	1	6	7
Squash	0	0	1	1
Totals (4 entries)	2	4	12	18

== Junior Pan American Games ==
=== Medals by games ===
Games	Gold	Silver	Bronze	Total	Rank
(Colombia) 2021 Cali-Valle	0	1	0	1	22nd
(Paraguay) 2025 Asunción	0	0	2	2	33rd
Total	0	1	2	3	22nd

=== Medals by sport ===
Sport	Gold	Silver	Bronze	Total
Athletics	0	1	1	2
Swimmming	0	0	1	1
Totals (2 entries)	0	1	2	3

=== Medalists ===
Medal	Name	Games	Sport	Event
Silver	Chantoba Bright	2021 Cali-Valle	Athletics	Women's triple jump
