= Boxing at the 2026 Asian Games – Men's 60 kg =

Boxing competitions

Men's 60 kg at the 2026 Asian Games
- Venue: Nishio City Gymnasium
- Date: 23 September – 2 October 2026
- Competitors: 28 from 28 nations

Medalists
gold medal	Abdumalik Khalokov	Uzbekistan
silver medal	Jang Dong-hwan	South Korea
bronze medal	Shunsuke Kitamoto	Japan
bronze medal	Akmal Ubaidov	Tajikistan

The men's 60 kilograms event at the 2026 Asian Games took place from 23 September to 2 October 2026 at the Nishio City Gymnasium, Nishio, Aichi Prefecture, Japan.

The gold medal was won by Uzbekistan's Abdumalik Khalokov, who defeated South Korea's Jang Dong-hwan 5–0 in the final. Shunsuke Kitamoto of Japan and Akmal Ubaidov of Tajikistan took the bronze medals.

== Schedule ==
All times are Japan Standard Time (UTC+09:00)

Date	Time	Event
Wednesday, 23 September 2026	12:00	Round of 32
Friday, 25 September 2026	13:00	Round of 16
Sunday, 27 September 2026	18:00	Quarterfinals
Tuesday, 29 September 2026	14:00	Semifinals
Friday, 2 October 2026	18:00	Final

== Results ==
=== Final ===
Final
Abdumalik Khalokov (UZB)	5
Jang Dong-hwan (KOR)	0

=== Top half ===
Round of 32
O Tae-bom (PRK)	5
Ziyad Majrashi (KSA)	0
Alvin Salinas (MAC)	0
Khagendra Roka Magar (NEP)	5
Junmilardo Ogayre (PHI)	3
Gantömöriin Lundaa (MGL)	2
Shunsuke Kitamoto (JPN)	5
Chen Xinlin (CHN)	0
Mohammed Sattar (IRQ)	5
Omar Budhahei (BRN)	0
Kinley (BHU)	0
Mohammad Abu Jajeh (JOR)	5

Round of 16
Abdumalik Khalokov (UZB)	5
O Tae-bom (PRK)	0
Khagendra Roka Magar (NEP)	0
Junmilardo Ogayre (PHI)	5
Shunsuke Kitamoto (JPN)	5
Mohammed Sattar (IRQ)	0
Mohammad Abu Jajeh (JOR)	1
Sachin Siwach (IND)	4

Quarterfinals
Abdumalik Khalokov (UZB)	5
Junmilardo Ogayre (PHI)	0
Shunsuke Kitamoto (JPN)	5
Sachin Siwach (IND)	0

Semifinals
Abdumalik Khalokov (UZB)	4
Shunsuke Kitamoto (JPN)	1

=== Bottom half ===
Round of 32
Lin Jun-you (TPE)	1
Jang Dong-hwan (KOR)	4
Danial Shahbakhsh (IRI)	5
Asri Udin (INA)	0
Salim Hossain (BAN)	0
Sakda Ruamtham (THA)	5
Döwlet Muhanow (TKM)	2
Ravindu Jayanath (SRI)	3
Emal Hamdam (AFG)	5
Mohamed Al-Fagay (QAT)	0
Souliya Khammy (LAO)	0
Akmal Ubaidov (TJK)	5

Round of 16
Orazbek Assylkulov (KAZ)	1
Jang Dong-hwan (KOR)	4
Danial Shahbakhsh (IRI)	1
Sakda Ruamtham (THA)	4
Ravindu Jayanath (SRI)	1
Emal Hamdam (AFG)	4
Akmal Ubaidov (TJK)	3
Munarbek Seitbek Uulu (KGZ)	0

Quarterfinals
Jang Dong-hwan (KOR)	3
Sakda Ruamtham (THA)	2
Emal Hamdam (AFG)	2
Akmal Ubaidov (TJK)	3

Semifinals
Jang Dong-hwan (KOR)	5
Akmal Ubaidov (TJK)	0
