= Canadian Weightlifting Federation =

Governing body for the sport of weightlifting in Canada

Weightlifting Canada Haltérophilie
- Sport: Weightlifting
- Jurisdiction: Canada
- Abbreviation: WCH
- Founded: 1909
- Affiliation: IWF
- (Canada)

Canadian Weightlifting Federation-Haltérophilie Canadienne (CWFHC) is the governing body for the sport of weightlifting in Canada.

== History ==
The origins of Canadian olympic weightlifting started from the beginning of the 20th century. Canada produced a large number of World Championships and Olympic athletes since the 1924 Summer Olympic Games.
