= Estadio Tlaquepaque =

Mexican rugby stadium

Tlaquepaque Stadium
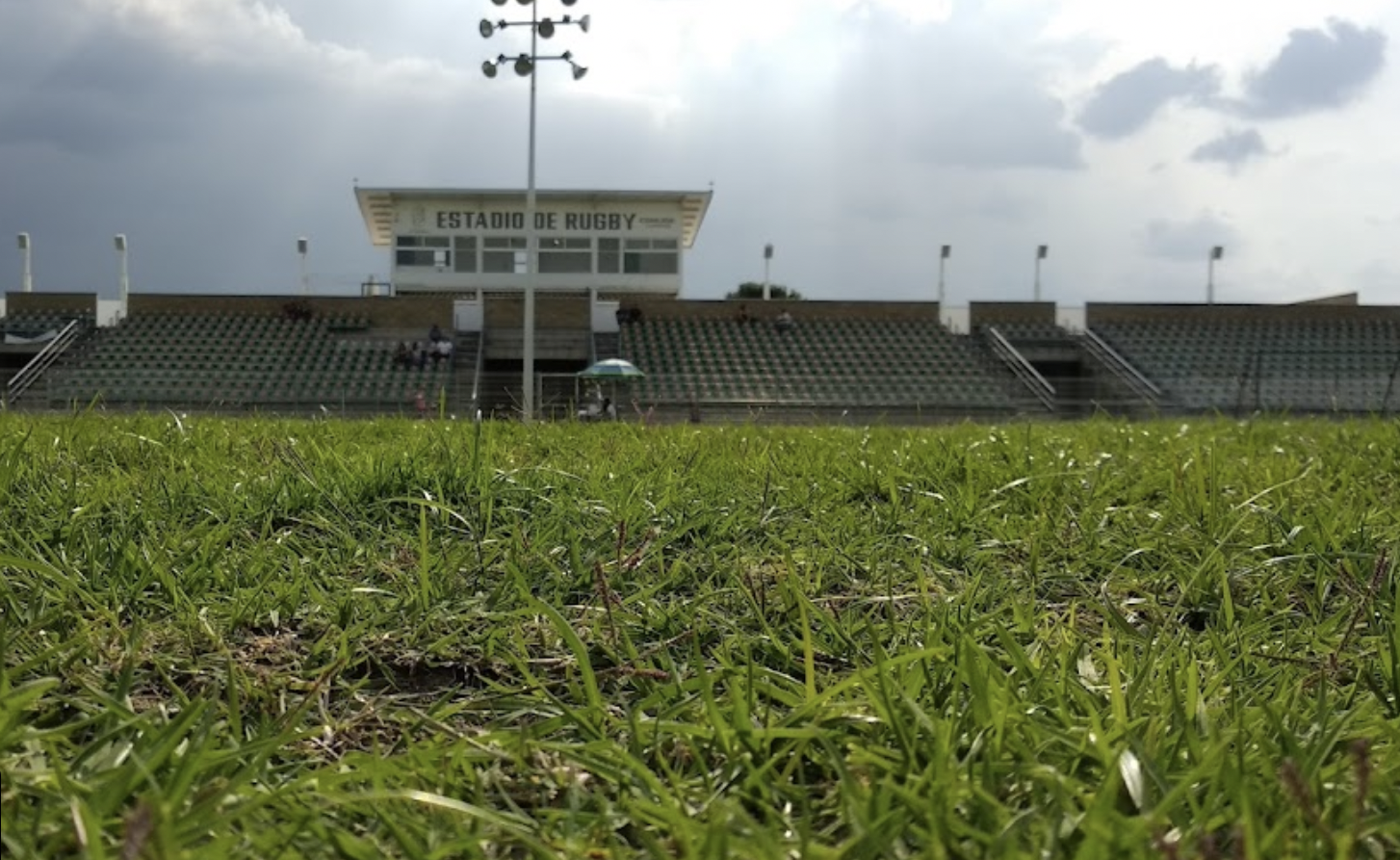
- Interactive map of Tlaquepaque Stadium
- Location: Unidad Valentín Gómez Farías; 7 Diego Rivera Street; Center Zone; Tlaquepaque, Jalisco, Mexico
- Coordinates: 20°38′04″N 103°18′00″W
- Capacity: 1,360
- Surface: Artificial turf

Construction
- Groundbreaking: 2008
- Opened: 2011

Tenants
- 2011 Pan American Games; Caja Oblatos C.F.D. (2020–present)

Tlaquepaque Stadium (Spanish: Estadio Tlaquepaque) is a 1,360 seat stadium that was built in 2011 to host the rugby sevens competition at the 2011 Pan American Games and the 2023 Gay Games.

After the sporting event was held, the stadium became managed by the municipality of Tlaquepaque as it was part of a municipal Sports Unit, so its use was intended for the general population to practice sports such as rugby and soccer. In 2020 it became the headquarters of the Caja Oblatos CFD team that participates in Mexico's Third Division.
