= Desmond Amsterdam =

Guyanese boxer

Personal information
- Nationality: Guyana

Boxing career
Medal record
Men's amateur boxing
Representing Guyana
South American Games
Bronze medal – third place	2022 Asunción	Light heavyweight

Desmond Amsterdam is a Guyanese boxer. He competed at the 2022 South American Games in the boxing competition, winning the bronze medal in the men's light heavyweight event. He previously competed at the 2021 AIBA World Boxing Championships in the middleweight event and at the 2022 Commonwealth Games in the men's middleweight event, winning no medal in either.
