= Blaine Scully =

US international rugby union player

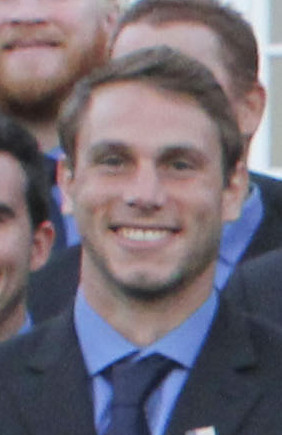
- Scully with the USA Eagles in October 2015
- Full name: Blaine Hansen Scully
- Born: February 29, 1988 (age 38) Sacramento, California, U.S.
- Height: 6 ft 3 in (191 cm)
- Weight: 209 lb (95 kg; 14 st 13 lb)
- School: Jesuit High School
- University: University of California, Berkeley

Rugby union career
- Position(s): Wing, Fullback
Senior career
| Years | Team | Apps | (Points) |
| 2013–2015 | Leicester Tigers | 35 | (30) |
| 2015–2019 | Cardiff Blues | 51 | (60) |
- Correct as of 13 October 2019
International career
| Years | Team | Apps | (Points) |
| 2011–2019 | United States | 54 | (75) |
- Correct as of 13 October 2019
National sevens team
| Years | Team | | Comps |
| 2009–2013 | United States | | 9 |
- Correct as of 13 October 2019

Blaine Hansen Scully (born February 29, 1988) is an American former rugby union player who played for the U.S. national team as a fullback or wing. Scully was captain of the U.S. national team and previously served as co-captain alongside long-serving USA Eagle, Todd Clever. Professionally, Scully last played in Wales for Cardiff Blues and for the Leicester Tigers. Scully also founded the United States Rugby Players Association (USRPA) with former 7s Eagle, James Gillenwater.

== Early life ==
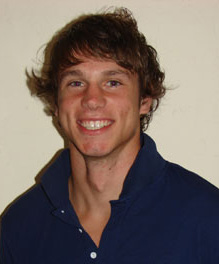
Scully headshot in 2009

Scully was born in Sacramento, California. He attended Jesuit High School in Sacramento, where he lettered in basketball, swimming, and water polo, and earned All-American honors in water polo and swimming.

Scully took up rugby in college, where he played for UCLA for two years before transferring to play rugby with University of California, Berkeley (Cal) for the following three years. Scully was a standout player in college, his accolades include: four time All-American, captain of the 2011 USA Rugby Collegiate All-Americans Touring Squad, and two national titles with Cal.

Scully also played for the Cal rugby sevens team at the Collegiate Rugby Championship (CRC). Scully led Cal to a second-place finish at the 2010 CRC tournament. Scully captained Cal at the 2011 CRC, earning a place on the All-Tournament team.

Scully graduated from Cal in 2011 with a degree in history.

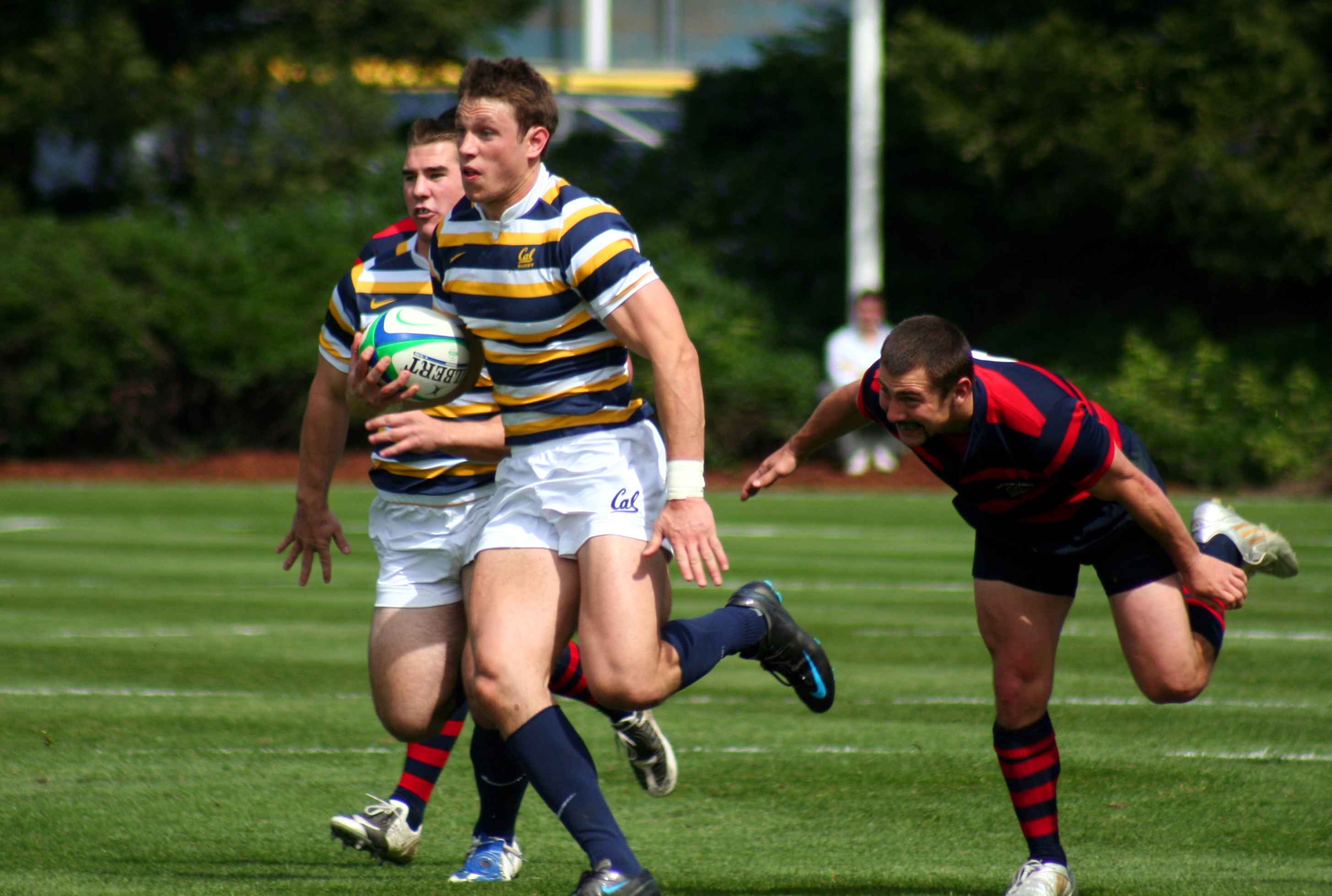
Scully makes a break for Cal in a match against St. Mary's in 2010.

== Club career ==
=== Leicester Tigers ===
In summer 2013, Scully joined the Leicester team that played in the 2013 JP Morgan 7s, and was praised highly by many observers for his hard work and defense. Due to his strong play, in the autumn of 2013 Scully received a four-month contract with the Leicester Tigers through the end of 2013. Scully received his work visa in September 2013, and a few days later, on September 21, 2013, Scully made his debut for Leicester, where he started and played all 80 minutes at fullback, scoring a try in the process. Scully made his debut in the Heineken Cup on October 18, 2013, starting on the wing against Benetton Treviso, and scoring a try. On January 4, 2014, Scully signed a new deal with Leicester Tigers until the end of the season. Due to his tireless work rate Scully quickly became a fan favourite and won the Leicester Tigers Player of the Month award for February 2014. In April 2014 Scully signed an extension to remain with Leicester for the 2014–15 season.

=== Cardiff Blues ===
On March 24, 2015, it was announced Scully had signed for the Cardiff Blues on a long-term deal after the 2015 Rugby World Cup. Scully made his debut in a 15-26 loss to Zebre in a Pro12 match in November 2015. Scully scored his first try in his second appearance for Cardiff during their European Challenge Cup win over Calvisano. Scully won Try of the 2016-2017 Season for his diving effort against the Scarlets. He also shared "Cardiff Blues Supporters Club Player of the Year" honors with Kristen Dacey. Scully signed a contract extension with the club in late 2017.

On 9 May 2019 Cardiff announced Scully was to leave the club that summer.

== International career ==
Scully debuted for the United States national rugby union team in June 2011, and scored his first try for the US national team in August 2011 against Canada. Scully was part of the United States squad at the 2011 Rugby World Cup. Scully played in all four pool games for the United States, including two starts at fullback. On June 14, 2014 Scully recorded his first hat trick for his country in a 29-37 loss in the Pacific Nations Cup to Japan. He followed that performance up with a brace of tries the next week in a winning effort against Canada.

Scully served as Vice-Captain during the 2015 Rugby World Cup in England. He also captained the United States in the inaugural game of the Americas Rugby Championship against Argentina. Scully also played for the United States national rugby sevens team on the World Series circuit. Scully also represented the US playing rugby sevens at the 2011 Pan American Games, helping the team earn a bronze medal. Scully captained the USA team at the 2019 World Cup. He announced his retirement from professional and international rugby on 10 March 2020.

== See also ==
- California Golden Bears
- Collegiate Rugby Championship
