= Clive Atwell =

Guyanese boxer (born 1988)

Personal information
- Nationality: Guyanese
- Born: Clive Junior Atwell; 11 November 1988 (age 37) Friendship, Guyana
- Height: 170 cm (5 ft 7 in)
- Weight: Featherweight; Super featherweight; Lightweight; Super lightweight

Boxing career
- Reach: 168 cm (66 in)

Boxing record
- Total fights: 17
- Wins: 13
- Win by KO: 7
- Losses: 3
- Draws: 1
Medal record
Men's amateur boxing
Representing Guyana
Pan American Games
| Bronze medal – third place | Rio de Janeiro 2007 | Bantamweight |

Clive Junior Atwell (born 11 November 1988) is a Guyanese former professional boxer who competed from 2010 to 2015 and challenged for the WBC featherweight title in 2014. As an amateur he won a bronze medal at the 2007 Pan American Games as a bantamweight.

== Amateur career ==
Atwell won gold at the Caribbean Amateur Boxing Association championships in Trinidad in 2006 and the bronze medal at the 2007 Pan American Games in the Bantamweight category.

== Professional career ==
His debut professional fight was 29 January 2010, where he defeated Carlton Skeete. Atwell challenged for his first world title on 24 May 2014 against WBC Featherweight champion Jhonny González, but lost by tenth-round technical decision.

He fought Kye Mc Kenzie for the Interim PABA super featherweight title in Melbourne, Australia, but lost and was hospitalized after the fight, His next win was against Jamaican Sakima Mullings on 21 February 2015, for the super lightweight CABOFE WBC title.

In October 2015, during a match for the FECARBOX World Boxing Council's (WBC) lightweight title against Dexter Gonzales, Atwell fainted during the match. He was immediately hospitalized and later went to the US for corrective cranial surgery effectively ending his boxing career.

== Professional boxing record ==
| 17 fights | 13 wins | 3 losses |
|---|---|---|
| By knockout | 7 | 2 |
| By decision | 6 | 1 |
| Draws | 1 | |

| No. | Result | Record | Opponent | Type | Round, time | Date | Location | Notes |
|---|---|---|---|---|---|---|---|---|
| 17 | Loss | 13–3–1 | (Trinidad and Tobago) Dexter Gonzales | TKO | 8 (12) | 24 October 2015 | Giftland Office Max, Georgetown, Guyana | For vacant WBC–CABOFE lightweight title |
| 16 | Win | 13–2–1 | (Jamaica) Sakima Mullings | SD | 12 | 21 February 2015 | Cliff Anderson Sports Hall, Georgetown, Guyana | Won vacant WBC–CABOFE super lightweight title |
| 15 | Loss | 12–2–1 | (Australia) Kye MacKenzie | TKO | 10 (12), 1:11 | 12 November 2014 | Hisense Arena, Melbourne, Australia | For PABA interim super featherweight title |
| 14 | Loss | 12–1–1 | (Mexico) Jhonny González | TD | 10 (12) | 24 May 2014 | Convection Center, Acapulco, Mexico | For WBC featherweight title; Unanimous TD after González was cut from an accidental head clash |
| 13 | Win | 12–0–1 | (Jamaica) Glenroy Beckford | KO | 2 (8) | 15 October 2013 | Cliff Anderson Sports Hall, Georgetown, Guyana | |
| 12 | Win | 11–0–1 | (Guyana) Anson Green | KO | 3 (8), 0:25 | 3 August 2013 | Cliff Anderson Sports Hall, Georgetown, Guyana | |
| 11 | Win | 10–0–1 | (Venezuela) Rafael Hernandez | UD | 12 | 20 April 2013 | The Princess Hotel, Georgetown, Guyana | Won vacant WBC–CABOFE featherweight title |
| 10 | Win | 9–0–1 | (Guyana) Revlon Lake | KO | 3 (12) | 28 December 2012 | Cliff Anderson Sports Hall, Georgetown, Guyana | Won Guyanese lightweight title |
| 9 | Win | 8–0–1 | (Trinidad and Tobago) Prince Lee Isidore | TKO | 12 (12), 0:40 | 26 October 2012 | Cliff Anderson Sports Hall, Georgetown, Guyana | Won vacant WBC–CABOFE super lightweight title |
| 8 | Win | 7–0–1 | (Guyana) Orlando Rogers | TKO | 5 (6) | 13 October 2012 | Thirst Park, Georgetown, Guyana | |
| 7 | Win | 6–0–1 | (Guyana) Revlon Lake | KO | 4 (8) | 27 July 2012 | Cliff Anderson Sports Hall, Georgetown, Guyana | |
| 6 | Win | 5–0–1 | (Guyana) Rudolph Fraser | KO | 2 (12) | 29 June 2012 | Cliff Anderson Sports Hall, Georgetown, Guyana | Won vacant Guyanese featherweight title |
| 5 | Win | 4–0–1 | (Guyana) Orlando Rogers | UD | 6 | 29 October 2011 | Thirst Park, Ruimveldt, Guyana | |
| 4 | Win | 3–0–1 | (Guyana) Earl Trotmann | PTS | 6 | 6 November 2010 | Princess Hotel and Casino, Providence, Guyana | |
| 3 | Win | 2–0–1 | (Guyana) Cecil Smith | UD | 4 | 29 October 2010 | Cliff Anderson Sports Hall, Georgetown, Guyana | |
| 2 | Draw | 1–0–1 | (Guyana) Mark Austin | PTS | 4 | 24 September 2010 | Cliff Anderson Sports Hall, Georgetown, Guyana | |
| 1 | Win | 1–0 | (Guyana) Carlton Skeete | PTS | 4 | 29 January 2010 | Cliff Anderson Sports Hall, Georgetown, Guyana | |
