= Asror Vokhidov =

Tajikistani boxer (born 1995)

Asror Akramkhanovich Vokhidov
Personal information
- Nationality: Tajikistani
- Born: 20 October 1995 (age 30) Isfara, Tajikistan
- Height: 5 ft 6 in (168 cm)
- Weight: Super-bantamweight

Boxing career
- Stance: Southpaw

Boxing record
- Total fights: 7
- Wins: 7
- Win by KO: 3
Medal record
Men's amateur boxing
Representing Tajikistan
Junior World Championships
Gold medal – first place	2011 Astana	Light-flyweight

Asror Akramkhanovich Vokhidov (born 20 October 1995) is a Tajikistani professional boxer. As an amateur, he won a gold medal at the 2011 Junior World Championships, and later competed at the 2014 and 2018 Asian Games.

== Medals ==
- In the 2011 AIBA Junior World Championships Asrorov won a gold medal at the Junior World Championships. He was 16.

== Results ==
=== AIBA Junior World Boxing Championships, Astana 2011 ===
- Defeated Vladislav Krasnosheyn (Russia) 20-9
