= Keevin Allicock =

Guyanese boxer (born 1999)

Personal information
- Nationality: Guyanese
- Born: 9 June 1999 (age 27) Georgetown, Guyana

Sport
- Sport: Boxing
Medal record
Men's amateur boxing
Representing Guyana
Caribbean Championships
| Gold medal – first place | 2017 Gros Islet | Bantamweight |
| Gold medal – first place | 2018 Georgetown | Bantamweight |
| Gold medal – first place | 2019 Couva | Bantamweight |
| Silver medal – second place | 2016 Bridgetown | Bantamweight |

Keevin Allicock (born 9 June 1999) is a Guyanese boxer. He competed in the men's featherweight event at the 2020 Summer Olympics. He lost to Alexy de la Cruz of Dominican in the first round.
