= List of Guyanese records in athletics =

The following are the national records in athletics in Guyana maintained by its national athletics federation: Athletics Association of Guyana (AAG).

== Outdoor ==
Key to tables: Awaiting ratification Record not kept by AAG Not ratified or later rescinded by AAG

=== Men ===
Event	Record	Athlete	Date	Meet	Place	Ref.
100 m	10.09 (+2.0 m/s)	Emanuel Archibald	15 June 2024	Guyanese Championships	Leonora, Guyana	
200 m	20.14 (+1.8 m/s)	James Gilkes	12 September 1978		Ingelheim am Rhein, Germany	
400 m	44.87	Malachi Austin	29 May 2026	NCAA Division I East First Rounds	Lexington, United States	
800 m	1:45.54	Quamel Prince	14 July 2023	Harry Jerome Track Classic	Langley, Canada	
1500 m	3:43.81	Quamel Prince	13 April 2019		Fairfax, United States	
3000 m	8:21.3	Deryck Menties	9 August 1975		Georgetown, Guyana	
5000 m	14:07.08	Cleveland Forde	10 November 2006	South American Games	Buenos Aires, Argentina	
10,000 m	31:14.14	Kelvin Johnson	21 June 2013	NAAA Sagicor General/NGC National Championships	Port of Spain, Trinidad and Tobago	
Marathon	2:25:02	Andrew Smith	29 May 2004		Louisville, United States	
110 m hurdles	13.73	Charles Allen	6 April 2002		Clemson, United States	
400 m hurdles	49.95	Paul Tucker	13 August 2000		La Chaux-de-Fonds, Switzerland	
3000 m steeplechase	10:03.0	Clement Fields	9 August 1959		Georgetown, Guyana	
High jump	2.17 m	Robert Bynoe	17 April 1995		Georgetown, Guyana	
Pole vault	4.11 m	Reginald Dash	1 April 1967		Ponce, Puerto Rico	
Long jump	8.22 m (±0.0 m/s)	Emanuel Archibald	17 May 2025	Adidas Games	Atlanta, United States	
Triple jump	17.18 (+1.7 m/s)	Troy Doris	14 May 2016	NTC/PURE Athletics Sprint Elite Meet	Clermont, United States	
Shot put	17.17 m	Patrick Harding	25 March 2001		Tuscaloosa, United States	
Discus throw	50.44 m	Patrick Harding	5 May 2001		Piscataway, United States	
Hammer throw	60.98 m	Patrice Parris	10 May 1985		Cambridge, United States	
Javelin throw	78.65 m	Leslain Baird	6 June 2018	South American Games	Cochabamba, Bolivia	
Decathlon	5842 pts h	Laurence Taitt	25–26 July 1959		London, United Kingdom	
Decathlon	100m (wind) / Long jump (wind) / Shot put / High jump / 400m / 110m H (wind) / Discus / Pole vault / Javelin / 1500m; 11.5 / 6.63 m / 9.86 m / 1.78 m / 53.4 / 14.9 / 26.55 m / 3.12 m / 35.36 m / 4:40.8					
Decathlon	5892 pts (Note: no details available for a conversion from 1962 to 1984 tables)	Victor Benjamin	13–14 November 1983		Georgetown, Guyana	
Decathlon	100m (wind) / Long jump (wind) / Shot put / High jump / 400m / 110m H (wind) / Discus / Pole vault / Javelin / 1500m					
20 km walk (road)						
50 km walk (road)						
4 × 100 m relay	39.59 A	Guyana; Clifton Schultz; Dennis Collison; Aubrey Wilson; James Gilkes	20 October 1975	Pan American Games	Mexico City, Mexico	
4 × 200 m relay	1:24.42	Guyana; Adam Harris; Winston George; Jeremy Bascom; Stephan James	25 April 2015	Penn Relays	Philadelphia, United States	
4 × 400 m relay	3:09.00	Guyana; Jermaine Griffith; Winston George; Kelton Cumberbatch; Alistar McLean	29 April 2017	Penn Relays	Philadelphia, United States	
Sprint medley relay (2,2,4,8)	3:31.77	Guyana; Akeem Stewart (200 m); Emmanuel Archibald (200 m); Revon Williams (400 m); Samuel Lynch (800 m)	28 April 2018	Penn Relays	Philadelphia, United States	

=== Women ===
Event	Record	Athlete	Date	Meet	Place	Ref.
100 m	11.14 (+1.8 m/s)	Brenessa Thompson	18 June 2016	Aliann Pompey Invitational	Leonora, Guyana	
200 m	22.94 (+1.1 m/s)	Brenessa Thompson	11 May 2017	SEC Championships	Columbia, United States	
400 m	50.71	Aliann Pompey	16 August 2009	World Championships	Berlin, Germany	
800 m	1:59.47	Marian Burnett	31 May 2004		Palo Alto, United States	
1500 m	4:17.91	Marian Burnett	27 July 2007	Pan American Games	Rio de Janeiro, Brazil	
3000 m	10:11.31	Alika Morgan	8 May 2005		Port of Spain, Trinidad and Tobago	
5000 m	17:42.52	Abidemi Charles	3 May 2003		Macomb, United States	
10,000 m	37:21.71	Abidemi Charles	15 May 2003		Macomb, United States	
Half marathon	1:26:16	Abidemi Charles	19 May 2001		Overland, United States	
Marathon	3:01:08	Abidemi Charles	30 January 2000	CLICO Trinidad and Tobago Marathon	Port of Spain, Trinidad and Tobago	
100 m hurdles	13.27 (+1.7 m/s)	Jenea McCammon	30 July 2018	Central American and Caribbean Games	Barranquilla, Colombia	
400 m hurdles	58.46	Jenea McCammon	14 May 2016	NTC/PURE Athletics Sprint Elite Meet	Clermont, United States	
3000 m steeplechase	11:32.82	Jennifer Chichester	8 May 2010	MEAC Championships	Greensboro, United States	
3000 m steeplechase	11:32.24	Kaitlyn Chandrika	8 May 2022	Ivy League Championships	New Haven, United States	
High jump	1.90 m	Najuma Fletcher	3 June 1995		Knoxville, United States	
High jump	1.90 m	Najuma Fletcher	11 August 1995	World Championships	Gothenburg, Sweden	
Pole vault						
Long jump	6.82 m	Jennifer Inniss	14 August 1982		Nice, France	
Triple jump	13.74 m	Nicola Martial	3 June 1995		Knoxville, United States	
Shot put	13.15 m	Tiffany Pilgrim	2 November 2016		Leonora, Guyana	
Discus throw	37.10 m	Shauna Robertson	19 October 1997		Georgetown, Guyana	
Hammer throw						
Javelin throw	45.37 m	Anisha Gibbons	3 April 2022		Leonora, Guyana	
Heptathlon	5750 pts	Najuma Fletcher	1–2 June 1994		Boise, United States	
Heptathlon	100m H (wind) / High jump / Shot put / 200m (wind) / Long jump (wind) / Javelin / 800m; 13.84 / 1.79 m / 10.91 m / 24.39 / 6.23 m / 32.36 m / 2:21.14					
20 km walk (road)						
50 km walk (road)						
4 × 100 m relay	46.40	Guyana; Shenika King; Jasmine Abrams; Chante Moore; Jenea McCammon	28 April 2018	Penn Relays	Philadelphia, United States	
Sprint medley relay (1,1,2,4)	1:42.36	Guyana; Jasmine Abrams (100 m); Chante Moore (100 m); Shenika King (200 m); Jenea McCammon (400 m)	28 April 2018	Penn Relays	Philadelphia, United States	
4 × 400 m relay	3:45.08	Guyana; Ashlynn DeCruise; Aliann Pompey; Angilla Corlette; Ashley DeCruise	14 June 2008	USATF-NJ Masters & Open Outdoor T&F Championship	West Long Beach, United States	

=== Mixed ===
Event	Record	Athlete	Date	Meet	Place	Ref.
4 × 400 m relay	3:17.31	Guyana; Tianna Springer; Malachi Austin; Daniel Williams; Aliyah Abrams	4 May 2024	World Relays	Nassau, Bahamas	

== Indoor ==
=== Men ===
Event	Record	Athlete	Date	Meet	Place	Ref.
55 m	6.21	Adam Harris	17 January 2014	Jimmy Carnes Invitational	Gainesville, United States	
60 m	6.55	Adam Harris	21 February 2014	GVSU Tune Up	Allendale, United States	
200 m	20.76	Winston George	10 February 2018	David Hemery Valentine Invitational	Boston, United States	
300 m	33.00	Arinze Chance	11 January 2019	Clemson Orange & Purple Elite	Clemson, United States	
400 m	46.15	Arinze Chance	19 January 2019	Clemson Invitational	Clemson, United States	
400 m	46.15 OT	Jermaine Griffith	26 February 2016	Big Ten Championships	Geneva, United States	
500 m	1:03.87	Jermaine Griffith	14 January 2017	Beantown Challenge	Cambridge, United States	
600 m	1:15.99	Quamel Prince	25 February 2022	Fastrack Last Chance	Chicago, United States	
800 m	1:46.35	Quamel Prince	5 March 2022	Meet Of Champions	Chicago, United States	
1000 m	2:19.01	Quamel Prince	12 February 2022	Boston University David Hemery Valentine Invitational	Boston, United States	
1500 m	3:56.81	Andrew Smith	7 February 2003		Bloomington, United States	
3000 m	8:47.70	Andrew Smith	18 January 2004		Carbondale, United States	
60 m hurdles	7.85	Charles Allen	19 February 2000	ACC Championships	Blacksburg, United States	
High jump	2.14 m	Devon Bond	28 February 2009	Big 12 Championships	College Station, United States	
Pole vault						
Long jump	8.05 m	Mark Mason	25 January 1991		Johnson City, United States	
Triple jump	16.49 m	Troy Doris	10 February 2018	New Balance Indoor Grand Prix	Boston, United States	
Shot put	17.73 m (Note: outdoor mark ratified as absolute record)	Patrick Harding	18 February 2001		Syracuse, United States	
Heptathlon						
Heptathlon	60m / Long jump / Shot put / High jump / 60m H / Pole vault / 1000m					
5000 m walk						
4 × 200 m relay	1:28.08	Guyana; Jeremy Bascom; Winston George; Ken Nelson; Stefan Smith	27 January 2018	Dr. Norb Sander Invitational	New York City, United States	
4 × 400 m relay						

=== Women ===
Event	Record	Athlete	Date	Meet	Place	Ref.
50 m	6.31	Jennifer Inniss	11 February 1983	S.F. Examiner Games	Daly City, United States	
55 m	6.76	Jennifer Inniss	25 February 1983	USA Championships	New York City, United States	
60 m	7.30	Jasmine Abrams	21 January 2022	Carolina Challenge	Columbia, United States	
60 m	7.26 A	Jasmine Abrams	12 February 2022	Don Kirby Collegiate Elite	Albuquerque, United States	
200 m	23.02	Brenessa Thompson	26 January 2019	Texas Tech Classic	Lubbock, United States	
300 m	37.09	Aliyah Abrams	12 February 2022	American Track League	Louisville, United States	
400 m	51.83	Aliann Pompey	26 February 2010	NYU Fastrack Invitational	New York City, United States	
400 m	51.57	Aliyah Abrams	18 March 2022	World Championships	Belgrade, Serbia	
500 m	1:09.23	Aliann Pompey	5 March 2000		Boston, United States	
800 m	2:02.27	Marian Burnett	8 March 2008	World Championships	Valencia, Spain	
1500 m	5:00.64 y	Jennifer Chichester	30 January 2010		State College, United States	
Mile	5:00.64	Jennifer Chichester	30 January 2010		State College, United States	
3000 m	10:10.10	Abidemi Charles	28 February 2003		Sterling, United States	
60 m hurdles	8.45	Myrtle Chester	5 February 1982		Louisville, United States	
60 m hurdles	8.45	Jenea McCammon	4 February 2017	BU Scarlet and White	Boston, United States	
High jump	1.87 m	Najuma Fletcher	11 March 1995		Indianapolis, United States	
Pole vault						
Long jump	6.53 m	Jennifer Inniss	27 February 1984		New York City, United States	
Triple jump	14.10 m	Natricia Hooper	29 January 2022	Bob Pollock Invitational	Clemson, United States	
Shot put	12.36 m	Najuma Fletcher	18 February 1996		Syracuse, United States	
Pentathlon	3860 pts A	Myrtle Chester	14 March 1981		Pocatello, United States	
Pentathlon	60m H / High jump / Shot put / Long jump / 800m					
Pentathlon	4295 pts	Najuma Fletcher	18 February 1995		Syracuse, United States	
Pentathlon	(55 m hurdles), (high jump), (shot put), (long jump), (800 m)					
Pentathlon	4203 pts	Najuma Fletcher	3 December 1994		Morgantown, United States	
Pentathlon	7.6 h (55 m hurdles), 1.82 m (high jump), 10.00 m (shot put), 6.29 m (long jump), 2:27.5 (800 m)					
3000 m walk						
4 × 200 m relay	1:40.14	Guyana; Shenika King; Iana Amsterdam; Natricia Hooper; Jenea McCammon	27 January 2018	Dr. Norb Sander Invitational	New York City, United States	
4 × 400 m relay						
