= List of South American records in athletics =

South American records in athletics are the best marks set in an event by an athlete who competes for a member nation of Atletismo Sudamericano. The organisation is responsible for ratification and it analyses each record before approving it. Records may be set on any continent and at any competition, providing that the correct measures are in place (such as wind-gauges) to allow for a verifiable and legal mark.

== Outdoor ==
Key to tables: Awaiting ratification Record not kept by Atletismo Sudamericano Not ratified or later rescinded by Atletismo Sudamericano

at = automatic timing

# = not officially recognized by World Athletics

=== Men ===
Event	Record	Athlete	Nationality	Date	Meet	Place	Ref.	Video
60 m	6.49 (−0.4 m/s)	Erik Cardoso	Brazil	18 February 2026	Circuito Performance 1 - Short Track	São Paulo, Brazil		
60 m	6.49 (−0.3 m/s)	Erik Cardoso	Brazil	18 February 2026	Circuito Performance 1 - Short Track	São Paulo, Brazil		
100 m	9.85 (+1.5 m/s) A	Ronal Longa	Colombia	26 June 2026	Pan American Championships	Medellín, Colombia		
100 m	9.82 X (Note: The mark was not ratified after the Brazilian Athletics Federation reported a technical issue) (+1.9 m/s)	Erik Cardoso	Brazil	11 April 2026	Sao Paulo Athletics Trophy Meet	São Paulo, Brazil		
150 m (straight)	14.91 (+1.4 m/s)	Bruno de Barros	Brazil	31 March 2013	Mano a Mano Challenge	Rio de Janeiro, Brazil		
200 m	19.81 (−0.3 m/s)	Alonso Edward	Panama	20 August 2009	World Championships	Berlin, Germany		
200 m straight	20.03 (+0.3 m/s)	Alonso Edward	Panama	20 May 2018	Adidas Boost Boston Games	Boston, United States		
300 m	32.05	Robson da Silva	Brazil	17 September 1991		Jerez de la Frontera, Spain		
400 m	43.93	Anthony Zambrano	Colombia	2 August 2021	Olympic Games	Tokyo, Japan		
800 m	1:41.77	Joaquim Cruz	Brazil	26 August 1984		Cologne, Germany		
1000 m	2:14.09	Joaquim Cruz	Brazil	20 August 1984	Meeting Nikaïa	Nice, France		
1500 m	3:33.25	Hudson de Souza	Brazil	28 August 2005	IAAF Grand Prix	Rieti, Italy		
Mile	3:51.05	Hudson de Souza	Brazil	29 July 2005		Oslo, Norway		
Mile (road)	3:53.0 h	Joaquim Cruz	Brazil	13 May 1984		Los Angeles, United States		
Mile (road)	4:02.75	Guilherme Kurtz	Brazil	1 October 2023	World Road Running Championships	Riga, Latvia		
2000 m	5:03.34	Hudson de Souza	Brazil	6 April 2002		Manaus, Brazil		
2000 m	5:02.3+	Santiago Catrofe	Uruguay	16 May 2026	Shanghai Diamond League	Shaoxing/Keqiao, China		
3000 m	7:29.72	Santiago Catrofe	Uruguay	16 May 2026	Shanghai Diamond League	Shaoxing/Keqiao, China		
Two miles	8:18.09	Santiago Catrofe	Uruguay	3 July 2026	Prefontaine Classic	Eugene, United States		
5000 m	12:59.26	Santiago Catrofe	Uruguay	20 June 2025	Meeting de Paris	Paris, France		
5 km (road)	12:57	Santiago Catrofe	Uruguay	16 March 2025		Lille, France		
10,000 m	27:28.12	Marílson dos Santos	Brazil	2 June 2007		Neerpelt, Belgium		
10 km (road)	27:16	Santiago Catrofe	Uruguay	12 January 2025	10K Valencia Ibercaja	Valencia, Spain		
15 km (road)	42:15+	Marílson dos Santos	Brazil	14 October 2007	World Road Running Championships	Udine, Italy		
10 miles (road)	46:19	Valdenor dos Santos	Brazil	9 April 1995		Washington, D.C., United States		
20,000 m (track)	1:02:17.8	Elói Schleder	Brazil	27 November 1976		São Paulo, Brazil		
20 km (road)	56:32+	Marílson dos Santos	Brazil	14 October 2007	World Road Running Championships	Udine, Italy		
One hour	20129 m	Víctor Mora	Colombia	15 August 1973		Essen, West Germany		
Half marathon	59:33	Marílson dos Santos	Brazil	14 October 2007	World Road Running Championships	Udine, Italy		
25,000 m (track)	1:22.39.6+	Silvano Lima	Brazil	27 April 2012		São Paulo, Brazil		
25 km (road)	1:15:02+	Silvio Guerra	Ecuador	4 March 2001		Lake Biwa, Japan		
25 km (road)	1:15:02+	Vanderlei de Lima	Brazil	7 December 2003		Fukuoka, Japan		
25 km (road)	1:14:17+ a	Marilson dos Santos	Brazil	17 April 2011	London Marathon	London, United Kingdom		
30,000 m (track)	1:38:47.0	Silvano Lima	Brazil	27 April 2012		São Paulo, Brazil		
30 km (road)	1:29:21+	Marilson dos Santos	Brazil	17 April 2011	London Marathon	London, United Kingdom		
Marathon	2:04:51	Daniel Ferreira do Nascimento	Brazil	17 April 2022	Seoul Marathon	Seoul, South Korea		
100 km (road)	6:18:09 #	Valmir Nunes	Brazil	16 September 1995		Winschoten, Netherlands		
110 m hurdles	13.17 (+0.4 m/s)	Rafael Pereira	Brazil	22 June 2022	Brazilian Championships	Rio de Janeiro, Brazil		
200 m hurdles (straight)	21.85 (+1.5 m/s)	Alison dos Santos	Brazil	17 May 2025	Adidas Games	Atlanta, United States		
300 m hurdles	33.01	Alison dos Santos	Brazil	16 May 2026	Shanghai Diamond League	Shaoxing/Keqiao, China		
400 m hurdles	45.80	Alison dos Santos	Brazil	27 August 2026	Weltklasse Zürich	Zurich, Switzerland		
3000 m steeplechase	8:14.41	Wander Moura	Brazil	22 March 1995	Pan American Games	Mar del Plata, Argentina		
High jump	2.33 m A	Gilmar Mayo	Colombia	17 October 1994		Pereira, Colombia		
Pole vault	6.03 m	Thiago Braz	Brazil	15 August 2016	Olympic Games	Rio de Janeiro, Brazil		
Long jump	8.73 m (+1.2 m/s)	Irving Saladino	Panama	24 May 2008	Fanny Blankers-Koen Games	Hengelo, Netherlands		
Triple jump	17.90 m (+0.4 m/s)	Jadel Gregório	Brazil	20 May 2007		Belém, Brazil		
Shot put	22.61 m	Darlan Romani	Brazil	30 June 2019	IAAF Diamond League	Palo Alto, United States		
Discus throw	70.29 m	Mauricio Ortega	Colombia	22 July 2020		Lovelhe, Portugal		
Hammer throw	78.63 m	Wagner Domingos	Brazil	19 June 2016	Slovenian Championships	Celje, Slovenia		
Javelin throw	91.00 m	Luiz Maurício da Silva	Brazil	3 August 2025	Brazilian Championships	São Paulo, Brazil		
Decathlon	8393 pts	Carlos Eduardo Chinin	Brazil	7–8 June 2013	Brazilian Championships	São Paulo, Brazil		
Decathlon	100m (wind) / Long jump (wind) / Shot put / High jump / 400m / 110m H (wind) / Discus / Pole vault / Javelin / 1500m; 10.85 (+0.5 m/s) / 7.55 m (+0.9 m/s) / 15.28 m / 2.04 m / 48.18 / 14.08 (+1.0 m/s) / 42.46 m / 4.90 m / 59.58 m / 4:34.77							
5 km walk (road)	19:25+	Caio Bonfim	Brazil	1 June 2025	IV GP Internacional Madrid Marcha Silbo Telecom	Madrid, Spain		
10 km walk (road)	38:10	Luis Fernando López	Colombia	18 September 2010	IAAF World Race Walking Challenge Final	Beijing, China		
15 km walk (road)	59:33+	Éider Arévalo	Colombia	13 August 2017	World Championships	London, United Kingdom		
20,000 m walk (track)	1:18:37.9 h	Caio Bonfim	Brazil	31 July 2025	Brazilian Championships	São Paulo, Brazil		
20 km walk (road)	1:17:21	Jefferson Pérez	Ecuador	23 August 2003	World Championships	Saint-Denis, France		
Half marathon walk	1:21:44	Caio Bonfim	Brazil	15 February 2026	Japanese Half Marathon Race Walking Championships	Kobe, Japan		
30 km walk (road)	2:09:49	Héctor Moreno	Colombia	1 May 1991		Italy		
35 km walk (road)	2:24:34	Brian Pintado	Ecuador	24 August 2023	World Championships	Budapest, Hungary		
Marathon walk	3:05:57 A	David Hurtado	Ecuador	12 April 2026	World Team Championships	Brasília, Brazil		
50,000 m walk (track)	3:57:58.0	Claudio dos Santos	Brazil	20 September 2008		Blumenau, Brazil		
50 km walk (road)	3:42:57 A	Andrés Chocho	Ecuador	6 March 2016	IAAF Race Walking Challenge	Ciudad Juárez, Mexico		
4 × 100 m relay	37.72	Rodrigo do Nascimento; Vitor Hugo dos Santos; Derick Silva; Paulo André de Oliveira	Brazil	5 October 2019	World Championships	Doha, Qatar		
4 × 200 m relay	1:24.42	Adam Harris; Winston George; Jeremy Bascom; Stephan James	Guyana	25 April 2015	Penn Relays	Philadelphia, United States		
4 × 400 m relay	2:58.56	Eronilde de Araújo; Anderson Jorge dos Santos; Claudinei da Silva; Sanderlei Parrela	Brazil	30 July 1999	Pan American Games	Winnipeg, Canada		
Sprint medley relay (2,2,4,8)	3:44.70	Owen Adonis (200 m); Tevin Garraway (200 m); Earl Lucas (400 m); Laurindo Prince (800 m)	Guyana	29 April 2017	Penn Relays	Philadelphia, United States		
4 × 800 m relay	7:47.3 h	Esporte Clube Pinheiros; Otto Neumann; Pedro Prado; José Azevedo; Carlos De José	Brazil	21 April 1965		São Paulo, Brazil		
4 × 1500 m relay	15:38.4 #	Ricardo Montero; Roberto Salmona; Pedro E. Warnke; Víctor Ríos	Chile	1971				
Marathon road relay (Ekiden)	2:01.24 #	Wander Moura (14:49); Vanderlei de Lima (29:10); Edgar de Oliveira (14:26); Delmir dos Santos (28:31); Tomix da Costa (14:26); Ronaldo da Costa (21:02)	Brazil	14 April 1996		Copenhagen, Denmark		

=== Women ===
Event	Record	Athlete	Nationality	Date	Meet	Place	Ref.
60 m	7.05 (±0.0 m/s)	Ana Carolina Azevedo	Brazil	18 February 2026	Circuito Performance 1 - Short Track	São Paulo, Brazil	
100 m	10.91 (−0.2 m/s)	Rosângela Santos	Brazil	6 August 2017	World Championships	London, United Kingdom	
150 m (bend)	17.50 (+2.0 m/s)	Ana Cláudia Lemos	Brazil	31 August 2013	Amsterdam Open & Flame Games	Amsterdam, Netherlands	
150 m (straight)	16.75 NWI	Franciela Krasucki	Brazil	31 March 2013	Mano a Mano Challenge	Rio de Janeiro, Brazil	
200 m	22.47 (+1.4 m/s)	Vitória Cristina Rosa	Brazil	19 July 2022	World Championships	Eugene, Oregon	
300 m	36.90	Maria Magnólia Figueiredo	Brazil	21 July 1996		Marietta, United States	
400 m	49.64	Ximena Restrepo	Colombia	5 August 1992	Olympic Games	Barcelona, Spain	
600 m	1:25.05	Luciana Mendes	Brazil	3 August 2004		Naimette-Xhovémont, Belgium	
800 m	1:56.58	Letitia Vriesde	Suriname	13 August 1995	World Championships	Gothenburg, Sweden	
1000 m	2:32.25	Letitia Vriesde	Suriname	10 September 1991	ISTAF	Berlin, Germany	
1500 m	4:05.50	Micaela Levaggi	Argentina	4 July 2026	X Ordizia Meeting - International Meeting Jose Antonio Peña	Ordizia, Spain	
Mile	4:27.41	Joselyn Brea (Note: Joselyn Daniely Brea has dual Spanish and Venezuelan nationality)	Venezuela	21 July 2023	Herculis	Fontvieille, Monaco	
Mile (road)	4:45.81 Wo	María Pía Fernández	Uruguay	1 October 2023	World Road Running Championships	Riga, Latvia	
Mile (road)	4:40.0 h	Belén Casetta	Argentina	16 December 2017		Buenos Aires, Argentina	
2000 m	5:50.21	María Pía Fernández	Uruguay	12 July 2024	Herculis	Fontvieille, Monaco	
3000 m	8:43.26	Joselyn Brea (Note: Joselyn Daniely Brea has dual Spanish and Venezuelan nationality)	Venezuela	16 July 2023	Kamila Skolimowska Memorial	Chorzów, Poland	
5000 m	14:36.59	Joselyn Brea	Venezuela	17 May 2024	Los Angeles Grand Prix	Los Angeles, United States	
5 km (road)	15:39	Carmem de Oliveira	Brazil	6 June 1992	Freihofer's Run for Women	Albany, United States	
10,000 m	31:33.07	Florencia Borelli	Argentina	16 March 2024	The TEN	San Juan Capistrano, United States	
10,000 m	31:16.56 X	Simone Alves da Silva	Brazil	3 August 2011	Troféu Brasil de Atletismo	São Paulo, Brazil	
10 km (road)	31:44	Thalia Valdivia	Peru	26 April 2025	Adizero: Road to Records	Herzogenaurach, Germany	
15,000 m (track)	53:43.0+	Chiara Mainetti	Argentina	18 June 2022		Buenos Aires, Argentina	
15 km (road)	48:38	Carmem de Oliveira	Brazil	26 February 1994		Tampa, United States	
10 miles (track)	57:34.0+	Chiara Mainetti	Argentina	18 June 2022		Buenos Aires, Argentina	
10 miles (road)	52:55	Micaela Rivera Wood	Peru	12 April 2026	Credit Union Cherry Blossom Ten Mile	Washington, D.C., United States	
One hour (track)	16.795 m+	Chiara Mainetti	Argentina	18 June 2022		Buenos Aires, Argentina	
20,000 m (track)	1:11:17.6	Chiara Mainetti	Argentina	18 June 2022		Buenos Aires, Argentina	
20 km (road)	1:06:35+	Gladys Tejeda	Peru	26 March 2016	World Half Marathon Championships	Cardiff, United Kingdom	
Half marathon	1:09:31 Wo	Florencia Borelli	Argentina	21 August 2022	South American Half Marathon Championships	Buenos Aires, Argentina	
Half marathon	1:09:31 a	Carmem de Oliveira	Brazil	13 March 1994		Lisbon, Portugal	
Half marathon	1:04:50	Leone Justino da Silva	Brazil	28 September 2003		Buenos Aires, Argentina	
25 km (road)	1:24:56+	Florencia Borelli	Argentina	18 February 2024	Seville Marathon	Seville, Spain	
30 km (road)	1:41:42+	Florencia Borelli	Argentina	18 February 2024	Seville Marathon	Seville, Spain	
Marathon	2:24:18	Florencia Borelli	Argentina	18 February 2024	Seville Marathon	Seville, Spain	
100 km	7:20:22 #	Maria Venancio	Brazil	8 August 1998		Cubatão, Brazil	
100 m hurdles	12.49 (+1.3 m/s)	Maribel Caicedo	Ecuador	23 May 2024	NCAA Division I West First Rounds	Fayetteville, United States	
200 m hurdles (bend)	26.35 (−1.0 m/s)	Gianna Woodruff	Panama	13 March 2018 (Note: by Atletismo Sudamericano source; 10 March 2018 by World Athletics source)	Northridge CSUN All Comers	Northridge, United States	
200 m hurdles (straight)	26.12 (−0.2 m/s)	Gianna Woodruff	Panama	4 June 2017	Boost Boston Games	Boston, United States	
300 m hurdles	38.30	Gianna Woodruff	Panama	8 May 2026	Arkansas Twilight	Fayetteville, United States	
400 m hurdles	52.66	Gianna Woodruff	Panama	17 September 2025	World Championships	Tokyo, Japan	
2000 m steeplechase	6:01.47	Tatiane Raquel da Silva	Brazil	18 June 2023	Czeslaw Cybulski Memorial	Poznań, Poland	
3000 m steeplechase	9:24.38	Tatiane Raquel da Silva	Brazil	11 June 2022	British Miler Club International	Watford, United Kingdom	
High jump	1.96 m	Solange Witteveen	Argentina	8 September 1997		Oristano, Italy	
High jump	1.97 m X	Solange Witteveen	Argentina	19 May 2001	South American Championships	Manaus, Brazil	
Pole vault	4.87 m	Fabiana Murer	Brazil	3 July 2016	Brazilian Championships	São Bernardo do Campo, Brazil	
Long jump	7.26 m A (+1.8 m/s)	Maurren Maggi	Brazil	26 June 1999		Bogotá, Colombia	
Triple jump	15.67 m (+0.7 m/s)	Yulimar Rojas	Venezuela	1 August 2021	Olympic Games	Tokyo, Japan	
Shot put	19.30 m A	Elisângela Adriano	Brazil	14 July 2001		Tunja, Colombia	
Discus throw	65.34 m	Andressa de Morais	Brazil	26 June 2019	Jornadas de Lançamentos	Leiria, Portugal	
Discus throw	65.98 m X	Andressa de Morais	Brazil	6 August 2019	Pan American Games	Lima, Peru	
Hammer throw	73.74 m	Jennifer Dahlgren	Argentina	10 April 2010		Buenos Aires, Argentina	
Javelin throw	67.34 m	Flor Ruiz	Colombia	4 August 2026	CAC Games	Santo Domingo, Dominican Republic	
Weight throw	22.48 m	Jennifer Dahlgren	Argentina	5 February 2006		Gainesville, United States	
Heptathlon	6475 pts	Martha Araújo	Colombia	31 May – 1 June 2025	Hypo-Meeting	Götzis, Austria	
Heptathlon	100m H (wind) / High jump / Shot put / 200m (wind) / Long jump (wind) / Javelin / 800m; 13.32 (−1.0 m/s) / 1.74 m / 13.85 m / 24.50 (−0.6 m/s) / 6.63 m (−0.6 m/s) / 49.42 m / 2:15.89						
Decathlon	6570 pts	Andrea Bordalejo	Argentina	27–28 November 2004		Rosario, Argentina	
Decathlon	100m (wind) / Discus / Pole vault / Javelin / 400m / 100m H (wind) / Long jump (wind) / Shot put / High jump / 1500m						
5000 m walk (track)	20:35.38	Mary Luz Andía	Peru	16 August 2025	V Festival de Atletismo La Victoria	Lima, Peru	
5 km walk (road)	21:35+	Kimberly García	Peru	1 August 2024	Olympic Games	Paris, France	
5 km walk (road)	21:16	Glenda Morejón	Ecuador	15 April 2017	National Racewalking Championships	Sucúa, Ecuador	
10,000 m walk (track)	42:02.99	Sandra Arenas	Colombia	25 August 2018	Ibero-American Championships	Trujillo, Peru	
10 km walk (road)	42:58+	Glenda Morejón	Ecuador	8 June 2019	Gran Premio Cantones de Marcha	A Coruña, Spain	
15 km walk (road)	1:05:34+	Érica de Sena	Brazil	13 August 2017	World Championships	London, United Kingdom	
20,000 m walk (track)	1:29:07.5	Mary Luz Andía	Peru	28 July 2023	South American Championships	São Paulo, Brazil	
20 km walk (road)	1:25:29	Glenda Morejón	Ecuador	8 June 2019	Gran Premio Cantones de Marcha	A Coruña, Spain	
Half marathon walk	1:31:44	Kimberly García	Peru	8 May 2026	Poděbrady Walking	Poděbrady, Czech Republic	
30 km walk (road)	2:24:33	Paola Pérez	Ecuador	22 October 2017		Hauppauge, United States	
35 km walk (road)	2:37:44	Kimberly García	Peru	25 March 2023	Dudinská Päťdesiatka	Dudince, Slovakia	
Marathon walk	3:24:37 A	Paula Milena Torres	Ecuador	12 April 2026	World Team Championships	Brasília, Brazil	
50 km walk (road)	4:11:12	Johana Ordóñez	Ecuador	11 August 2019	Pan American Games	Lima, Peru	
4 × 100 m relay	42.29	Evelyn dos Santos; Ana Claudia Silva; Franciela Krasucki; Rosângela Santos	Brazil	18 August 2013	World Championships	Moscow, Russia	
4 × 200 m relay	1:35.91	Virginia Villalba; Anahí Suárez; Marizol Landázuri; Ángela Tenorio	Ecuador	12 May 2019	World Relays	Yokohama, Japan	
Sprint medley relay (1,1,2,4)	1:42.36	Jasmine Abrams (100 m); Chante Moore (100 m); Shenika King (200 m); Jenea McCammon (400 m)	Guyana	28 April 2018	Penn Relays	Philadelphia, United States	
4 × 400 m relay	3:26.68	BM&F Bovespa; Geisa Aparecida Coutinho; Bárbara de Oliveira; Joelma Sousa; Jailma de Lima	Brazil	7 August 2011	Troféu Brasil de Atletismo	São Paulo, Brazil	
4 × 800 m relay	9:29.10	C.R. Flamengo; Cristiane Barbosa; Cintia Fragoso; Lorena Oliveira; Ana Paula Pereira	Brazil	21 December 2000		Rio de Janeiro, Brazil	
4 × 1500 m relay	20:11.0	Olga Caccaviello; Iris Fernández; Liliana Angelucci; Beatriz Vázquez	Argentina	21 August 1977		Buenos Aires, Argentina	
Marathon road relay (Ekiden)	2:32:55	Ana de Souza (16.59); Maria Lúcia Vieira (37.01); Célia dos Santos (17.08); Rosângela Faria (37.03); Solange de Souza (17.42); Selma dos Reis (27.02)	Brazil	18 April 1998	World Road Relay Championships	Manaus, Brazil	

=== Mixed ===
Event	Record	Athlete	Nationality	Date	Meet	Place	Ref.
4 × 100 m relay	40.99	Erik Cardoso; Gabriela Mourão; Jorge Vides; Ana Carolina Azevedo	Brazil	30 May 2026	Ibero-American Championships	Lima, Peru	
4 × 400 m relay	3:14.42 A	Nicolás Salinas; Lina Licona; Daniel Balanta; Evelis Aguilar	Colombia	5 April 2025	Campeonato Nacional De Velocidad y Saltos	Bogotá, Colombia	

== Indoor ==
=== Men ===
Event	Record	Athlete	Nationality	Date	Meet	Place	Ref.
50 m	5.75+	Vicente de Lima	Brazil	10 February 2009	Meeting Pas de Calais	Liévin, France	
50 m	5.6 h	Fernando Acevedo	Peru	28 January 1978		Böblingen, Germany	
50 m	5.6 h	José Bento de Assis Junior	Brazil	22 August 1942		São Paulo, Brazil	
60 m	6.52	José Carlos Moreira	Brazil	13 February 2009		Paris, France	
100 m	10.42	Vicente de Lima	Brazil	4 February 2006	Tähtien kisat	Tampere, Finland	
200 m	20.65	Robson da Silva	Brazil	26 February 1989		Sindelfingen, Germany	
300 m	32.19	Robson da Silva	Brazil	24 February 1989	BW-Bank Meeting	Karlsruhe, Germany	
400 m	45.79	Matheus Lima	Brazil	21 March 2025	World Championships	Nanjing, China	
400 m	45.71	Matheus Lima	Brazil	20 March 2026	World Championships	Toruń, Poland	
500 m	1:01.35	Jhon Perlaza	Colombia	26 January 2019	Liberty Kickoff	Lynchburg, United States	
600 m	1:15.90	Osmar dos Santos	Brazil	31 January 2004		Boston, United States	
800 m	1:45.43	José Luíz Barbosa	Brazil	8 March 1989		Piraeus, Greece	
1000 m	2:16.99	Joaquim Cruz	Brazil	12 February 1989	Sparkassen Cup	Stuttgart, Germany	
1500 m	3:39.13	Thiago André	Brazil	8 February 2020	Copernicus Cup	Toruń, Poland	
1500 m	3:35.50	Valentín Soca	Uruguay	19 February 2026	Meeting Hauts-de-France Pas-de-Calais	Liévin, France	
Mile	3:56.26	Hudson de Souza	Brazil	10 February 2001	Tyson Invitational	Fayetteville, United States	
2000 m	5:09.61	Federico Bruno	Argentina	26 January 2013		Bordeaux, France	
3000 m	7:49.46	Jacinto Navarrete	Colombia	10 March 1991	World Championships	Sevilla, Spain	
Two miles	8:29.0 h	Jacinto Navarrete	Colombia	22 February 1987		San Diego, United States	
5000 m	13:42.54	Antonio Silio	Argentina	20 February 1990		San Sebastián, Spain	
50 m hurdles	6.57	Redelén Melo dos Santos	Brazil	28 January 2006		Groningen, Netherlands	
60 m hurdles	7.58	Rafael Pereira	Brazil	4 February 2022	ISTAF Indoor	Berlin, Germany	
60 m hurdles	7.58	Rafael Pereira	Brazil	9 February 2022		Mondeville, France	
60 m hurdles	7.58	Rafael Pereira	Brazil	14 February 2022	Meeting de l'Eure	Val-de-Reuil, France	
60 m hurdles	7.58 A	Rafael Pereira	Brazil	20 February 2022	South American Championships	Cochabamba, Bolivia	
60 m hurdles	7.58	Rafael Pereira	Brazil	20 March 2022	World Championships	Belgrade, Serbia	
60 m hurdles	7.58 A	Eduardo de Deus	Brazil	28 January 2024	South American Championships	Cochabamba, Bolivia	
60 m hurdles	7.57 A	Marcos Herrera	Ecuador	1 March 2026	South American Championships	Cochabamba, Bolivia	
High jump	2.31 m	Thiago Moura	Brazil	20 March 2022	World Championships	Belgrade, Serbia	
Pole vault	5.95 m	Thiago Braz	Brazil	20 March 2022	World Championships	Belgrade, Serbia	
Long jump	8.42 m	Irving Saladino	Panama	13 February 2008		Paiania, Greece	
Triple jump	17.56 m	Jadel Gregório	Brazil	12 March 2006	World Championships	Moscow, Russia	
Shot put	22.53 m	Darlan Romani	Brazil	19 March 2022	World Championships	Belgrade, Serbia	
Discus throw	57.62 m	Mauricio Ortega	Colombia	10 February 2017	ISTAF Indoor	Berlin, Germany	
Heptathlon	6010 pts	José Fernando Ferreira	Brazil	22–23 March 2025	World Championships	Nanjing, China	
Heptathlon	60m / Long jump / Shot put / High jump / 60m H / Pole vault / 1000m; 6.94 / 7.34 m / 14.50 m / 1.92 m / 7.96 / 5.20 m / 2:50.93						
5000 m walk	19:28.87	Sérgio Galdino	Brazil	13 March 1993	World Championships	Toronto, Canada	
4 × 200 m relay	1:28.08	Jeremy Bascom; Winston George; Ken Nelson; Stefan Smith	Guyana	27 January 2018	Dr. Norb Sander Invitational	New York City, United States	
4 × 400 m relay	3:10.50	Claudinei da Silva; Osmar dos Santos; Flávio Godoy; Geraldo Maranhao	Brazil	8 March 1997	World Championships	Paris, France	
4 × 400 m relay	3:07.05	Axel Gomez; Ryan Ignaiker Lopez Parra; Javier Gómez; Kelvis Padrino	Venezuela	22 March 2026	World Championships	Toruń, Poland	

=== Women ===
Event	Record	Athlete	Nationality	Date	Meet	Place	Ref.
50 m	6.31	Jennifer Inniss	Guyana	11 February 1983	S.F. Examiner Games	Daly City, United States	
55 m	6.76	Jennifer Inniss	Guyana	25 February 1983	USA Championships	New York City, United States	
60 m	7.14	Vitória Cristina Rosa	Brazil	18 March 2022	World Championships	Belgrade, Serbia	
60 m	7.09 A	Ana Carolina Azevedo	Brazil	28 February 2026	South American Championships	Cochabamba, Bolivia	
200 m	23.02	Brenessa Thompson	Guyana	26 January 2019	Texas Tech Classic	Lubbock, United States	
300 m	37.09	Aliyah Abrams	Guyana	12 February 2022	American Track League	Louisville, United States	
400 m	51.57	Aliyah Abrams	Guyana	18 March 2022	World Championships	Belgrade, Serbia	
500 m	1:09.23	Aliann Pompey	Guyana	5 March 2000		Boston, United States	
600 m	1:29.75	Déborah Rodríguez	Uruguay	26 January 2019	New Balance Indoor Grand Prix	Boston, United States	
800 m	1:59.21	Letitia Vriesde	Suriname	23 February 1997	AVIVA Indoor Grand Prix	Birmingham, United Kingdom	
1000 m	2:38.30	Letitia Vriesde	Suriname	25 February 1999	GE Galan	Stockholm, Sweden	
1500 m	4:12.95	Fedra Luna	Argentina	28 January 2023	Meeting Internacional Catalunya	Sabadell, Spain	
Mile	4:38.86	Rolanda Bell	Panama	21 January 2017	New Balance Games	New York City, United States	
3000 m	8:57.59	Fedra Luna	Argentina	4 February 2023		Val-de-Reuil, France	
5000 m	16:12.58	María Elena Calle	Ecuador	10 March 2000	NCAA Indoor Championships	Fayetteville, United States	
50 m hurdles	7.1 h	Edith Noeding	Peru	28 January 1976		Munich, Germany	
60 m hurdles	7.91	Yvette Lewis	Panama	7 March 2014	World Championships	Sopot, Poland	
High jump	1.94 m	Solange Witteveen	Argentina	9 February 2000		Brno, Czech Republic	
Pole vault	4.83 m	Fabiana Murer	Brazil	7 February 2015	Perche Elite Tour	Nevers, France	
Long jump	6.89 m	Maurren Maggi	Brazil	9 March 2008	World Championships	Valencia, Spain	
Triple jump	15.74 m	Yulimar Rojas	Venezuela	20 March 2022	World Championships	Belgrade, Serbia	
Shot put	18.33 m	Elisângela Adriano	Brazil	24 February 1999		Piraeus, Greece	
Weight throw	24.04 m	Jennifer Dahlgren	Argentina	10 March 2006		Fayetteville, United States	
Pentathlon	4292 pts	Vanessa Spínola	Brazil	14 February 2016	European Permit Combined Events Meeting	Tallinn, Estonia	
Pentathlon	60m H / High jump / Shot put / Long jump / 800m; 8.81 / 1.75 m / 13.62 m / 5.87 m / 2:18.25						
Pentathlon	4295 pts #	Najuma Fletcher	Guyana	18 February 1995		Syracuse, United States	
Pentathlon	(55 m hurdles), (high jump), (shot put), (long jump), (800 m)						
3000 m walk	13:24.95	Miriam Ramón	Ecuador	9 March 1991	World Championships	Seville, Spain	
4 × 200 m relay	1:40.14	Shenika King; Iana Amsterdam; Natricia Hooper; Jenea McCammon	Guyana	27 January 2018	Dr. Norb Sander Invitational	New York City, United States	
4 × 400 m relay	3:47.37 A	Lucía Sotomayor; Mariana Arce; Norelia Guasace; Cecilia Gómez	Bolivia	20 February 2022	South American Championships	Cochabamba, Bolivia	
4 × 400 m relay	3:33.78	Atletismo BM & F Coelho Neto; Almirao; P. dos Santos; L. de Oliveira	Brazil	24 September 2006		São Paulo, Brazil	
