= Athletics at the 2018 Central American and Caribbean Games – Results =

These are the full results of the athletics competition at the 2018 Central American and Caribbean Games which took place between 29 July and 2 August 2018 at Rafael Cotes Stadium in Barranquilla, Colombia.

== Men's results ==
=== 100 meters ===
Heats – July 29
Wind:
Heat 1: +2.4 m/s, Heat 2: -0.4 m/s, Heat 3: +2.7 m/s, Heat 4: +0.4 m/s

Rank	Heat	Name	Nationality	Time	Notes
1	1	Cejhae Greene	Antigua and Barbuda	10.02	Q
2	3	Javoy Tucker	Jamaica	10.09	Q
3	3	Reynier Mena	Cuba	10.10	Q
4	3	Jason Rogers	Saint Kitts and Nevis	10.10	Q
5	4	Nesta Carter	Jamaica	10.18	Q, SB
6	1	Emanuel Archibald	Guyana	10.21	Q
7	2	Mario Burke	Barbados	10.21	Q
8	2	Christopher Valdez	Dominican Republic	10.22	Q, SB
9	4	Jhonny Rentería	Colombia	10.22	Q, SB
10	1	Diego Palomeque	Colombia	10.31	Q
11	1	Fredd Dorsey III	United States Virgin Islands	10.33	q
12	4	Burkheart Ellis	Barbados	10.35	Q
13	2	Harlyn Pérez	Cuba	10.37	Q
14	4	Keston Bledman	Trinidad and Tobago	10.38	q
15	3	Shaquoy Stephens	British Virgin Islands	10.46	q
16	3	Jeffrey Vanan	Suriname	10.48	q
17	1	Shermal Calimore	Costa Rica	10.54	
18	2	Jurgen Themen	Suriname	10.55	
19	3	Mateo Edward	Panama	10.56	
20	2	Rafael Vásquez	Venezuela	10.62	
21	1	Devante Gardiner	Turks and Caicos Islands	10.65	
22	2	Gedyone Augusta	Curação	10.72	PB
23	4	Alexis Nieves	Venezuela	10.77	
24	2	Shaun Gill	Belize	10.85	
25	4	Arturo Deliser	Panama	10.86	
26	4	Prince Kwidama	Curação	10.89	
27	1	Rasheem Brown	Cayman Islands	10.89	
28	3	Wikenson Fenelon	Turks and Caicos Islands	10.97	
	3	Kyle Greaux	Trinidad and Tobago	DNS	

Semifinals – July 29
Wind:
Heat 1: +2.1 m/s, Heat 2: +0.5 m/s

Rank	Heat	Name	Nationality	Time	Notes
1	1	Nesta Carter	Jamaica	9.92	Q
2	2	Cejhae Greene	Antigua and Barbuda	10.00	Q, GR
3	2	Mario Burke	Barbados	10.03	Q, PB
4	2	Jason Rogers	Saint Kitts and Nevis	10.05	Q, SB
5	1	Reynier Mena	Cuba	10.06	Q
6	2	Javoy Tucker	Jamaica	10.08	q, PB
7	1	Christopher Valdez	Dominican Republic	10.09	Q
8	1	Burkheart Ellis	Barbados	10.10	q
9	1	Emanuel Archibald	Guyana	10.17	
10	2	Jhonny Rentería	Colombia	10.25	
11	2	Harlyn Pérez	Cuba	10.29	
12	1	Keston Bledman	Trinidad and Tobago	10.35	
13	1	Shaquoy Stephens	British Virgin Islands	10.41	
14	2	Fredd Dorsey III	United States Virgin Islands	10.59	
15	2	Jeffrey Vanan	Suriname	10.64	
	1	Diego Palomeque	Colombia	DNS	

Final – July 30
Wind: +1.7 m/s

Rank	Lane	Name	Nationality	Time	Notes
1st place, gold medalist(s)	6	Nesta Carter	Jamaica	10.07	SB
2nd place, silver medalist(s)	8	Jason Rogers	Saint Kitts and Nevis	10.15	
3rd place, bronze medalist(s)	3	Cejhae Greene	Antigua and Barbuda	10.16	
4	4	Mario Burke	Barbados	10.17	
5	2	Javoy Tucker	Jamaica	10.25	
6	7	Christopher Valdez	Dominican Republic	10.27	
7	5	Reynier Mena	Cuba	10.36	
	1	Burkheart Ellis	Barbados	DQ	R162.7

=== 200 meters ===
Heats – July 31
Wind:
Heat 1: +0.6 m/s, Heat 2: +0.9 m/s, Heat 3: +0.7 m/s

Rank	Heat	Name	Nationality	Time	Notes
1	3	Bernardo Baloyes	Colombia	20.04	Q, GR
2	2	Kyle Greaux	Trinidad and Tobago	20.34	Q
3	3	Rasheed Dwyer	Jamaica	20.37	Q
4	1	Alonso Edward	Panama	20.40	Q
5	2	Jahnoy Thompson	Jamaica	20.46	Q
6	2	Winston George	Guyana	20.46	Q, SB
7	3	Yancarlos Martínez	Dominican Republic	20.53	Q
8	1	Reynier Mena	Cuba	20.54	Q
9	2	Shane Brathwaite	Barbados	20.85	Q
10	2	Virjilio Griggs	Panama	20.86	Q
11	3	Burkheart Ellis	Barbados	20.92	q
12	1	Alberto Aguilar	Venezuela	21.01	Q, PB
13	2	Raymond Urbino	Dominican Republic	21.08	q
14	1	Jalen Purcell	Trinidad and Tobago	21.11	Q
15	1	Shermal Calimore	Costa Rica	21.11	q
16	2	Loïc Prevot	French Guiana	21.35	q, SB
17	2	Jeffrey Vanan	Suriname	21.40	
18	3	Arturo Ramírez	Venezuela	21.63	
19	1	Devante Gardiner	Turks and Caicos Islands	21.66	
20	3	James St. Hilaire	Haiti	22.97	
	3	Ronique Todman	British Virgin Islands	DQ	R162.7
	2	Darrell Wesh	Haiti	DNS	

Semifinals – July 31
Wind:
Heat 1: +0.3 m/s, Heat 2: +0.4 m/s

Rank	Heat	Name	Nationality	Time	Notes
1	2	Alonso Edward	Panama	19.96	Q, GR
2	2	Kyle Greaux	Trinidad and Tobago	19.97	Q, PB
3	1	Bernardo Baloyes	Colombia	20.00	Q, NR
4	1	Rasheed Dwyer	Jamaica	20.19	Q, SB
5	2	Jahnoy Thompson	Jamaica	20.23	Q
6	2	Reynier Mena	Cuba	20.26	q, PB
7	2	Yancarlos Martínez	Dominican Republic	20.54	q
8	1	Virjilio Griggs	Panama	20.79	Q
9	1	Alberto Aguilar	Venezuela	20.96	PB
10	1	Shane Brathwaite	Barbados	20.96	
11	1	Jalen Purcell	Trinidad and Tobago	21.07	
12	1	Raymond Urbino	Dominican Republic	21.10	
13	1	Loïc Prevot	French Guiana	21.58	
	2	Burkheart Ellis	Barbados	DQ	R162.7
	2	Winston George	Guyana	DQ	R162.7
	2	Shermal Calimore	Costa Rica	DNS	

Final – August 1
Wind: +0.9 m/s

Rank	Lane	Name	Nationality	Time	Notes
1st place, gold medalist(s)	5	Bernardo Baloyes	Colombia	20.13	
2nd place, silver medalist(s)	3	Alonso Edward	Panama	20.17	
3rd place, bronze medalist(s)	6	Kyle Greaux	Trinidad and Tobago	20.26	
4	4	Rasheed Dwyer	Jamaica	20.41	
5	8	Jahnoy Thompson	Jamaica	20.56	
6	1	Reynier Mena	Cuba	20.60	
7	2	Yancarlos Martínez	Dominican Republic	20.63	
8	7	Virjilio Griggs	Panama	20.96	

=== 400 meters ===
Heats – July 30

Rank	Heat	Name	Nationality	Time	Notes
1	4	Nery Brenes	Costa Rica	45.60	Q
2	4	Lidio Féliz	Dominican Republic	45.82	q, SB
3	3	Luguelín Santos	Dominican Republic	46.10	Q
4	4	Yoandys Lescay	Cuba	46.17	q, SB
5	1	Jhon Perlaza	Colombia	46.23	Q
6	2	Alonzo Russell	Bahamas	46.49	Q
7	1	Rusheen McDonald	Jamaica	46.64	q
8	3	Steven Gayle	Jamaica	46.74	q
9	2	Winston George	Guyana	46.77	
10	2	Yilmar Herrera	Colombia	46.82	
11	1	Anderson Devonish	Barbados	47.16	
12	4	Warren Hazel	Saint Kitts and Nevis	47.36	
13	4	Loïc Prevot	French Guiana	47.40	
14	1	Adrian Chacón	Cuba	47.57	
15	3	Jeikob Monge	Costa Rica	47.83	PB
16	3	Kelvis Padrino	Venezuela	48.07	
17	2	Angelo Garland	Turks and Caicos Islands	48.62	
18	1	Michael Rasmijn	Aruba	48.85	
19	3	Colby Jennings	Turks and Caicos Islands	49.19	
	4	José Melendez	Venezuela	DNF	
	2	Kimorie Shearman	Saint Vincent and the Grenadines	DQ	R163.3a
	2	Adriano Gumbs	British Virgin Islands	DQ	R163.3a
	3	José Bermúdez	Guatemala	DQ	R163.3a
	1	Antonio Grant	Panama	DNS	
	3	Ronique Todman	British Virgin Islands	DNS	

Final – August 1

Rank	Lane	Name	Nationality	Time	Notes
1st place, gold medalist(s)	6	Luguelín Santos	Dominican Republic	44.59	SB
2nd place, silver medalist(s)	7	Yoandys Lescay	Cuba	45.38	SB
3rd place, bronze medalist(s)	4	Nery Brenes	Costa Rica	45.61	
4	2	Rusheen McDonald	Jamaica	45.70	SB
5	3	Jhon Perlaza	Colombia	45.72	
6	5	Alonzo Russell	Bahamas	46.18	
7	8	Lidio Féliz	Dominican Republic	46.19	
8	1	Steven Gayle	Jamaica	46.97	

=== 800 meters ===
Heats – July 29

Rank	Heat	Name	Nationality	Time	Notes
1	1	Wesley Vázquez	Puerto Rico	1:47.10	Q
2	1	Jesús Tonatiu López	Mexico	1:47.31	Q
3	1	Anthonio Mascoll	Barbados	1:47.82	Q, SB
4	2	Ryan Sánchez	Puerto Rico	1:47.91	Q
5	2	Jorge Arturo Montes	Mexico	1:48.20	Q
6	2	Eric McKenzie	Jamaica	1:48.21	Q, PB
7	1	Jorge Liranzo	Cuba	1:48.66	q
8	2	Juan Diego Castro	Costa Rica	1:48.95	q, PB
9	2	Dage Minors	Bermuda	1:49.30	
10	1	Lucirio Antonio Garrido	Venezuela	1:49.49	
11	1	Javauney James	Jamaica	1:50.17	
12	2	Rafith Rodríguez	Colombia	1:50.33	SB
13	1	Jelssin Robledo	Colombia	1:50.75	
14	1	Chamar Chambers	Panama	1:50.90	SB
15	1	Malique Smith	United States Virgin Islands	1:52.86	SB
16	2	Ken Reyes	Turks and Caicos Islands	1:56.39	
	2	Nicholas Landeau	Trinidad and Tobago	DNF	

Final – July 30

Rank	Name	Nationality	Time	Notes
1st place, gold medalist(s)	Jesús Tonatiu López	Mexico	1:45.2	
2nd place, silver medalist(s)	Ryan Sánchez	Puerto Rico	1:46.3	
3rd place, bronze medalist(s)	Wesley Vázquez	Puerto Rico	1:46.6	
4	Anthonio Mascoll	Barbados	1:47.3	
5	Jorge Liranzo	Cuba	1:48.9	
6	Jorge Arturo Montes	Mexico	1:49.4	
7	Juan Diego Castro	Costa Rica	1:49.8	
8	Eric McKenzie	Jamaica	2:04.0	

=== 1500 meters ===
August 1

Rank	Name	Nationality	Time	Notes
1st place, gold medalist(s)	Fernando Daniel Martínez	Mexico	3:56.57	
2nd place, silver medalist(s)	José Eduardo Rodríguez	Mexico	3:56.70	
3rd place, bronze medalist(s)	Carlos San Martín	Colombia	3:56.78	
4	Alfredo Santana	Puerto Rico	3:57.26	
5	Jorge Liranzo	Cuba	3:57.47	
6	Andrés Arroyo	Puerto Rico	3:57.57	
7	Marvin Blanco	Venezuela	3:58.42	SB
8	Andy González	Cuba	4:01.90	
9	Dage Minors	Bermuda	4:10.63	

=== 5000 meters ===
July 31

Rank	Name	Nationality	Time	Notes
1st place, gold medalist(s)	José Mauricio González	Colombia	13:53.40	SB
2nd place, silver medalist(s)	Mario Pacay	Guatemala	13:56.30	
3rd place, bronze medalist(s)	Víctor Montañez	Mexico	14:05.87	PB
4	Iván Darío González	Colombia	14:12.96	SB
5	Fernando Daniel Martínez	Mexico	14:28.29	
6	Alberto González	Guatemala	14:41.53	
7	Álvaro Sanabria	Costa Rica	14:54.98	
8	Oscar Aldana	El Salvador	15:28.57	SB
9	Djakitchien Guerrier	Haiti	17:11.39	
	Eduardo Terrance Garcia	United States Virgin Islands	DNS	

=== 10,000 meters ===
July 29

Rank	Name	Nationality	Time	Notes
1st place, gold medalist(s)	Juan Luis Barrios	Mexico	30:07.49	
2nd place, silver medalist(s)	Mario Pacay	Guatemala	30:09.79	
3rd place, bronze medalist(s)	Iván Darío González	Colombia	30:15.23	
4	Luis Alberto Orta	Venezuela	30:15.48	
5	Miguel Ángel Amador	Colombia	30:40.91	
6	Alberto González	Guatemala	30:59.17	
7	Álvaro Sanabria	Costa Rica	31:15.48	
8	Eduardo Terrance Garcia	United States Virgin Islands	31:15.48	
9	Oscar Aldana	El Salvador	32:14.94	PB

=== Marathon ===
August 3

Rank	Name	Nationality	Time	Notes
1st place, gold medalist(s)	Jeison Suárez	Colombia	2:29:54	
2nd place, silver medalist(s)	Daniel Vargas	Mexico	2:30:30	
3rd place, bronze medalist(s)	Williams Julajuj	Guatemala	2:31:42	
4	Luis Carlos Rivero	Guatemala	2:35:13	
5	Dario Castro	Mexico	2:37:33	
6	Henrry Jaén	Cuba	2:39:17	
	José David Cardona	Colombia	DNF	

=== 110 meters hurdles ===
Heats – July 30
Wind:
Heat 1: +2.6 m/s, Heat 2: +1.9 m/s

Rank	Heat	Name	Nationality	Time	Notes
1	1	Roger Iribarne	Cuba	13.52	Q
2	1	Shane Brathwaite	Barbados	13.53	Q
3	2	Ruebin Walters	Trinidad and Tobago	13.64	Q
4	2	Juan Carlos Moreno	Colombia	13.72	Q
5	1	Elie Agot	Martinique	13.97	Q
6	1	Genaro Rodríguez	Mexico	14.04	q
7	2	Lafranz Campbell	Jamaica	14.06	Q
8	1	Aaron Lewis	Trinidad and Tobago	14.15	q
9	2	Gino Toscano	Panama	14.95	
10	2	Rasheem Brown	Cayman Islands	14.97	
	1	Phillip Lemonious	Jamaica	DNF	
	2	Jeffrey Julmis	Haiti	DQ	R168.7b

Final – July 31
Wind:
+1.4 m/s

Rank	Lane	Name	Nationality	Time	Notes
1st place, gold medalist(s)	4	Shane Brathwaite	Barbados	13.38	SB
2nd place, silver medalist(s)	5	Ruebin Walters	Trinidad and Tobago	13.57	
3rd place, bronze medalist(s)	6	Roger Iribarne	Cuba	13.58	
4	3	Juan Carlos Moreno	Colombia	13.94	
5	2	Genaro Rodríguez	Mexico	13.95	
6	8	Elie Agot	Martinique	13.99	
7	7	Lafranz Campbell	Jamaica	14.12	
	1	Aaron Lewis	Trinidad and Tobago	DNF	

=== 400 meters hurdles ===
Heats – July 29

Rank	Heat	Name	Nationality	Time	Notes
1	1	Kyron McMaster	British Virgin Islands	48.71	Q
2	1	Annsert Whyte	Jamaica	48.87	Q
3	1	Juander Santos	Dominican Republic	49.58	Q, SB
4	2	Shawn Rowe	Jamaica	49.69	Q
5	2	Fernando Arodi Vega	Mexico	49.86	Q, PB
6	1	Jehue Gordon	Trinidad and Tobago	49.86	q, SB
7	2	Gerald Drummond	Costa Rica	49.98	Q
8	1	Pablo Andrés Ibáñez	El Salvador	49.98	q, NR
9	1	Emmanuel Niño	Costa Rica	50.26	PB
10	2	Gerber Blanco	Guatemala	50.33	SB
11	1	Leandro Zamora	Cuba	50.50	
12	2	José Luis Gaspar	Cuba	50.82	
13	1	Fabian Norgrove	Barbados	50.86	
14	2	Andre Colebrook	Bahamas	51.45	
15	2	Boaz Madeus	Haiti	53.08	
16	2	Jeahvon Jackson	Cayman Islands	56.60	

Final – July 31

Rank	Lane	Name	Nationality	Time	Notes
1st place, gold medalist(s)	4	Kyron McMaster	British Virgin Islands	47.60	GR
2nd place, silver medalist(s)	5	Annsert Whyte	Jamaica	48.50	SB
3rd place, bronze medalist(s)	7	Juander Santos	Dominican Republic	48.77	SB
4	3	Shawn Rowe	Jamaica	49.30	
5	6	Fernando Arodi Vega	Mexico	49.85	PB
6	8	Gerald Drummond	Costa Rica	49.94	
7	1	Pablo Andrés Ibáñez	El Salvador	49.96	NR
8	2	Jehue Gordon	Trinidad and Tobago	50.02	

=== 3000 meters steeplechase ===
August 2

Rank	Name	Nationality	Time	Notes
1st place, gold medalist(s)	Gerald Giraldo	Colombia	8:44.51	SB
2nd place, silver medalist(s)	Ricardo Estremera	Puerto Rico	8:46.24	SB
3rd place, bronze medalist(s)	Andrés Camargo	Colombia	8:50.66	
4	Quetzalcoatl Delgado	Mexico	8:56.86	
5	Álvaro Abreu	Dominican Republic	9:02.28	
6	Christopher Endoqui	Mexico	9:03.24	
	José Peña	Venezuela	DNF	
	Marvin Blanco	Venezuela	DNS	

=== 4 × 100 meters relay ===
August 2

Rank	Lane	Nation	Competitors	Time	Notes
1st place, gold medalist(s)	5	Barbados	Shane Brathwaite, Mario Burke, Burkheart Ellis, Jaquone Hoyte	38.41	NR
2nd place, silver medalist(s)	4	Dominican Republic	Christopher Valdez, Yohandris Andújar, Stanly del Carmen, Yancarlos Martínez	38.71	SB
3rd place, bronze medalist(s)	3	Jamaica	Nesta Carter, Romario Williams, Rasheed Dwyer, Javoy Tucker	38.79	
4	2	Trinidad and Tobago	Nathan Farinha, Jonathan Farinha, Jalen Purcell, Keston Bledman	38.90	SB
5	8	Cuba	Harlyn Pérez, Roberto Skyers, Reynier Mena, Roger Iribarne	39.03	SB
6	6	Colombia	Jhonny Rentería, Diego Palomeque, Deivi Diaz, Bernardo Baloyes	39.17	
7	7	Venezuela	Alberto Aguilar, Alexis Nieves, Rafael Vásquez, Arturo Ramírez	39.63	
8	1	Curaçao	Gedyone Augusta, Prince Kwidama, Jean-Andre Denisia, Rachmil van Lamoen	40.97	

=== 4 × 400 meters relay ===
August 2

Rank	Nation	Competitors	Time	Notes
1st place, gold medalist(s)	Cuba	Leandro Zamora, Adrián Chacón, Raydel Rojas, Yoandys Lescay	3:03.87	SB
2nd place, silver medalist(s)	Dominican Republic	Luguelín Santos, Juander Santos, Andito Charles, Leonel Bonón	3:03.92	SB
3rd place, bronze medalist(s)	Colombia	Diego Palomeque, Rafith Rodríguez, Yilmar Herrera, Jhon Perlaza	3:04.35	SB
4	Venezuela	Alberto Aguilar, José Melendez, Kelvis Padrino, Omar Longart	3:06.62	
5	Bahamas	Michael Mathieu, Stephen Newbold, Kendrick Thompson, Alonzo Russell	3:07.31	
6	Costa Rica	Emmanuel Niño, Gerald Drummond, Jeikob Monge, Nery Brenes	3:08.31	SB
	Jamaica	Jahnoy Thompson, Ivan Henry, Devaughn Baker, Rusheen McDonald	DNF	
	Turks and Caicos Islands	Colby Jennings, Ifeanyichukwu Otuonye, Angelo Garland, Ken Reyes	DNF	

=== 20 kilometers walk ===
August 1

Rank	Name	Nationality	Time	Penalties	Notes
1st place, gold medalist(s)	Éider Arévalo	Colombia	1:26:42		
2nd place, silver medalist(s)	Manuel Esteban Soto	Colombia	1:26:59		
3rd place, bronze medalist(s)	Érick Barrondo	Guatemala	1:27:17	~~	
4	Andrés Olivas	Mexico	1:28:12		
5	Yassir Cabrera	Panama	1:28:56		
6	Carlos Sánchez	Mexico	1:32:54	~~>	
7	José Alejandro Barrondo	Guatemala	1:34:04	~~	
8	José Israel Mélendez	Puerto Rico	1:34:24		
9	Egrey Vargas	Venezuela	1:36:14	>~>	

=== 50 kilometers walk ===
August 1

Rank	Name	Nationality	Time	Penalties	Notes
1st place, gold medalist(s)	José Leyver Ojeda	Mexico	4:02:45		
2nd place, silver medalist(s)	Jorge Armando Ruiz	Colombia	4:05:28	>>	
3rd place, bronze medalist(s)	José Leonardo Montaña	Colombia	4:08:10	>>	
4	Bernardo Barrondo	Guatemala	4:24:20	>	
5	José María Raymundo	Guatemala	4:37:45		
	Omar Zepeda	Mexico	DNF	>>	
	José Leonidas Romero	Honduras	DNF		

=== High jump ===
August 1

Rank	Name	Nationality	1.90	2.00	2.05	2.10	2.13	2.16	2.19	2.22	2.24	2.26	2.28	2.30	2.33	Result	Notes
1st place, gold medalist(s)	Donald Thomas	Bahamas	–	–	–	–	o	–	o	–	o	o	o	x–	xx	2.28	
2nd place, silver medalist(s)	Eure Yáñez	Venezuela	–	–	–	o	–	xo	o	o	x–	o	o	xxx		2.28	=SB
3rd place, bronze medalist(s)	Jermaine Francis	Saint Kitts and Nevis	–	–	–	o	–	o	xo	xo	o	xxo	o	xxx		2.28	NR
4	Luis Castro	Puerto Rico	–	–	–	–	o	–	o	–	xo	–	xxo	xxx		2.28	SB
5	Jamal Wilson	Bahamas	–	–	–	–	o	–	o	o	xo	–	x–	xx		2.24	
6	Luis Enrique Zayas	Cuba	–	–	o	o	–	xo	o	xxx						2.19	
7	Alexander Bowen	Panama	–	–	o	o	–	o	xo	xxx						2.19	
8	Edgar Rivera	Mexico	–	–	–	o	–	o	xxx							2.16	
9	David Adley Smith	Puerto Rico	–	–	xo	–	xxo	o	–	xxx						2.16	
10	Clayton Brown	Jamaica	–	–	o	o	–	xo	xxx							2.16	
11	Roberto Vilches	Mexico	–	–	o	o	xo	xo	xxx							2.16	
12	Kareem Roberts	Trinidad and Tobago	–	xo	o	xo	xxx									2.10	
13	Wuill Vrolijk	Aruba	xo	o	o	xxx										2.05	SB
	Kivarno Handfield	Turks and Caicos Islands														DNS	

=== Pole vault ===
August 2

Rank	Name	Nationality	4.75	4.90	5.00	5.10	5.20	5.30	5.40	Result	Notes
1st place, gold medalist(s)	Lázaro Borges	Cuba	–	–	–	o	–	o	xxx	5.30	SB
1st place, gold medalist(s)	Walter Viáfara	Colombia	–	–	–	o	–	o	xxx	5.30	=PB
3rd place, bronze medalist(s)	Eduardo Nápoles	Cuba	–	–	xxo	–	o	x–	xx	5.20	
4	Natán Rivera	El Salvador	–	xxo	–	xo	xxx			5.10	=PB
5	Pablo Chaverra	Colombia	–	o	o	xxx				5.00	SB
6	Jorge Montes	Dominican Republic	–	–	xxo	–	xxx			5.00	=SB
7	Pedro Figueroa	El Salvador	xo	xxx						4.75	SB
	Daniel Arellano	Mexico	xxx							NM	

=== Long jump ===
Jule 31

Rank	Name	Nationality	#1	#2	#3	#4	#5	#6	Result	Notes
1st place, gold medalist(s)	Ramone Bailey	Jamaica	8.00	2.01	x	x	x	8.07	8.07	
2nd place, silver medalist(s)	Tyrone Smith	Bermuda	7.74	7.67	x	7.60	x	8.03	8.03	SB
3rd place, bronze medalist(s)	Andwuelle Wright	Trinidad and Tobago	7.75	x	x	7.39	x	7.94	7.94	
4	Emanuel Archibald	Guyana	7.64	7.80	7.62	7.71	7.46	7.83	7.83	SB
5	Maikel Vidal	Cuba	7.64	7.70	7.02	x	7.09	x	7.70	
6	Ifeanyichukwu Otuonye	Turks and Caicos Islands	7.47	7.58	7.66	7.45	5.93	x	7.66	
7	Sendy Mercedes	Dominican Republic	7.40	7.42	7.36	x	7.24	7.53	7.53	
8	Juan Mosquera	Panama	7.44	x	r				7.44	
9	Jhamal Bowen	Panama	7.01	x	7.28				7.28	
10	Charles Greaves	Barbados	x	x	7.21				7.21	
11	Santiago Cova	Venezuela	x	7.16	7.12				7.16	
12	Kizan David	Saint Kitts and Nevis	x	6.91	7.12				7.12	
13	Leon Hunt	United States Virgin Islands	7.11	6.98	x				7.11	
14	Becker Jarquín	Nicaragua	7.03	x	6.79				7.03	
15	Akeem Bradshaw	British Virgin Islands	6.45	6.55	6.52				6.55	
16	Nicolás Arriola	Guatemala	x	x	6.09				6.09	
	Muhammad Abdul Halim	United States Virgin Islands	x	x	x				NM	
	Juan Miguel Echevarría	Cuba							DNS	
	Wayne Pinnock	Jamaica							DNS	

=== Triple jump ===
August 2

Rank	Name	Nationality	#1	#2	#3	#4	#5	#6	Result	Notes
1st place, gold medalist(s)	Cristian Nápoles	Cuba	17.34	17.08w	17.08	16.76	–	15.50	17.34	PB
2nd place, silver medalist(s)	Jordan Díaz	Cuba	17.14w	17.27	17.29w	x	17.11	17.08	17.29w	
3rd place, bronze medalist(s)	Miguel van Assen	Suriname	16.73w	x	16.71w	15.58w	16.96	16.56w	16.96	PB
4	Jordan Scott	Jamaica	16.12	x	x	16.35	16.82	16.38	16.82	PB
5	Troy Doris	Guyana	16.17w	16.28	15.66	15.87	16.30	16.43w	16.43w	
6	Kaiwan Culmer	Bahamas	15.84w	16.01	15.94w	16.24w	16.10w	16.11w	16.24w	
7	Yordanys Durañona	Dominica	16.18	x	15.22	x	–	x	16.18	
8	Jhon Murillo	Colombia	x	16.07w	15.63w	14.48w	16.09w	15.97w	16.09w	
9	Leodan Torrealba	Venezuela	15.57	15.44	x				15.57	
10	Fredy Lemus	Guatemala	15.09	15.34	15.55w				15.55w	
11	Odaine Lewis	Jamaica	13.57	15.34	15.31				15.34	

=== Shot put ===
July 30

Rank	Name	Nationality	#1	#2	#3	#4	#5	#6	Result	Notes
1st place, gold medalist(s)	O'Dayne Richards	Jamaica	19.39	21.02	x	20.15	20.75	20.41	21.02	GR
2nd place, silver medalist(s)	Ashinia Miller	Jamaica	17.40	20.19	x	x	x	x	20.19	
3rd place, bronze medalist(s)	Eldred Henry	British Virgin Islands	19.91	19.98	19.84	20.07	20.18	20.06	20.18	PB
4	Uziel Muñoz	Mexico	18.88	x	19.43	x	x	19.87	19.87	PB
5	Mario Cota	Mexico	18.63	x	18.92	x	19.34	18.85	19.34	
6	Hezekiel Romeo	Trinidad and Tobago	x	16.87	18.12	17.44	17.36	18.57	18.57	PB
7	Akeem Stewart	Trinidad and Tobago	x	17.63	x	x	18.48	x	18.48	
8	Devon Patterson	Puerto Rico	x	17.20	x	16.01	16.73	16.62	17.20	
9	Dequan Lovell	Barbados	17.07	x	x				17.07	
10	Tristan Whitehall	Barbados	x	16.35	x				16.35	

=== Discus throw ===
July 29

Rank	Name	Nationality	#1	#2	#3	#4	#5	#6	Result	Notes
1st place, gold medalist(s)	Mauricio Ortega	Colombia	66.30	55.94	x	65.73	62.15	x	66.30	NR
2nd place, silver medalist(s)	Jorge Fernández	Cuba	65.27	61.06	x	x	x	61.96	65.27	SB
3rd place, bronze medalist(s)	Traves Smikle	Jamaica	62.73	62.22	x	60.29	x	64.68	64.68	
4	Mario Cota	Mexico	54.60	59.13	57.79	59.64	59.66	60.79	60.79	SB
5	Basil Bingham	Jamaica	60.26	59.43	x	59.09	59.59	57.80	60.26	SB
6	Joshua-Benjamin Phelipa	Curaçao	x	x	50.15	51.12	x	51.30	51.30	SB
7	Winston Campbell	Honduras	45.38	47.77	49.11	x	x	x	49.11	

=== Hammer throw ===
July 31

Rank	Name	Nationality	#1	#2	#3	#4	#5	#6	Result	Notes
1st place, gold medalist(s)	Diego del Real	Mexico	71.14	70.78	72.08	72.79	74.95	x	74.95	GR
2nd place, silver medalist(s)	Reinier Mejías	Cuba	x	71.58	72.63	72.01	73.28	70.43	73.28	
3rd place, bronze medalist(s)	Roberto Janet	Cuba	70.83	x	73.11	x	x	68.23	73.11	
4	Roberto Sawyers	Costa Rica	67.22	70.40	71.98	70.55	70.17	70.94	71.98	SB
5	Caniggia Raynor	Jamaica	58.90	61.62	65.94	65.76	63.77	64.34	65.94	
6	Diego Berrios	Guatemala	59.20	60.45	61.23	x	60.12	x	61.23	
7	Enrique Martínez	El Salvador	x	x	55.51	54.97	x	x	55.51	

=== Javelin throw ===
August 2

Rank	Name	Nationality	#1	#2	#3	#4	#5	#6	Result	Notes
1st place, gold medalist(s)	Keshorn Walcott	Trinidad and Tobago	81.78	x	–	–	70.91	84.47	84.47	
2nd place, silver medalist(s)	Anderson Peters	Grenada	73.36	77.22	x	81.80	77.34	80.45	81.80	
3rd place, bronze medalist(s)	David Carreón	Mexico	76.11	69.25	75.25	70.93	76.27	71.24	76.27	
4	Leslain Baird	Guyana	65.24	63.60	74.72	x	68.03	65.63	74.72	
5	Arley Ibargüen	Colombia	x	73.86	74.57	73.93	72.60	71.75	74.57	
6	Felix Markim	Grenada	72.49	74.28	69.59	70.76	x	x	74.28	
7	Albert Reynolds	Saint Lucia	73.56	72.18	72.56	73.54	x	69.34	73.56	
8	Alex Pascal	Cayman Islands	73.21	x	x	62.41	66.38	63.72	73.21	SB
9	Luis Mario Taracena	Guatemala	66.55	x	68.28				68.28	
10	Orlando Thomas	Jamaica	63.94	67.96	64.49				67.96	

=== Decathlon ===
July 29–30

The highest mark recorded in each event is highlighted in yellow

Rank	Athlete	Nationality	100m	LJ	SP	HJ	400m	110m H	DT	PV	JT	1500m	Points	Notes
1st place, gold medalist(s)	Leonel Suárez	Cuba	11.17w	7.14	13.84	2.05	50.53	14.57	44.72	4.70	64.00	4:34.21	8026	
2nd place, silver medalist(s)	José Lemos	Colombia	11.12w	7.03	16.60	1.87	51.14	14.58	55.12	4.10	65.80	4:58.00	7913	NR
3rd place, bronze medalist(s)	Briander Rivero	Cuba	10.94w	7.41w	13.55	2.05	49.44	14.46	44.61	4.20	55.80	4:43.86	7858	
4	Felipe Ruiz	Mexico	11.25w	7.00w	13.10	1.90	50.65	15.27	42.61	4.50	52.66	4:48.99	7340	
5	Ken Mullings	Bahamas	10.97w	7.19	12.10	2.05	52.22	14.57	33.17	4.10	47.39	5:20.82	6973	PB
6	José Miguel Paulino	Dominican Republic	11.07w	7.30	12.99	1.93	49.26	14.71	40.07	NM	52.23	4:49.94	6779	
7	Ronald Ramírez	Guatemala	11.28w	6.60	12.78	1.84	57.80	14.78	39.41	3.80	58.81	5:43.80	6470	
	Georni Jaramillo	Venezuela	10.79w	7.52	15.67	NM	DNS	–	–	–	–	–	DNF	

== Women's results ==
=== 100 meters ===
Heats – July 29
Wind:
Heat 1: +2.2 m/s, Heat 2: +1.2 m/s, Heat 3: +2.9 m/s

Rank	Heat	Name	Nationality	Time	Notes
1	1	Jonielle Smith	Jamaica	11.19	Q
2	2	Andrea Purica	Venezuela	11.24	Q, NR
3	1	Marileidy Paulino	Dominican Republic	11.27	Q
4	2	Zakiyah Denoon	Trinidad and Tobago	11.49	Q
5	2	Mariely Sánchez	Dominican Republic	11.54	Q
5	3	Khalifa St. Fort	Trinidad and Tobago	11.54	Q
7	1	Tahesia Harrigan-Scott	British Virgin Islands	11.55	Q
8	1	Yasmin Woodruff	Panama	11.56	Q
9	3	Jura Levy	Jamaica	11.62	Q
10	1	Shenel Crooke	Saint Kitts and Nevis	11.64	q
11	2	LaVerne Jones	United States Virgin Islands	11.66	Q, SB
12	2	Geylis Montes	Cuba	11.74	q
13	3	Gemima Joseph	French Guiana	11.74	Q
14	3	Nia Jack	United States Virgin Islands	11.79	Q
15	3	Tracy Joseph	Costa Rica	11.87	q
16	1	Taahira Butterfield	Bermuda	11.88	q
17	2	Sunayna Wahi	Suriname	11.90	
18	2	Akia Guerrier	Turks and Caicos Islands	11.99	NR
19	3	Rosa Mosquera	Panama	12.29	
20	3	Nediam Vargas	Venezuela	12.51	
21	3	Faith Morris	Belize	12.55	
	2	Rosa Baltazar	Guatemala	DNF	
	1	Yunisleidy García	Cuba	DNS	

Semifinals – July 29
Wind:
Heat 1: +1.5 m/s, Heat 2: +1.9 m/s

Rank	Heat	Name	Nationality	Time	Notes
1	1	Jonielle Smith	Jamaica	11.22	Q
2	2	Khalifa St. Fort	Trinidad and Tobago	11.31	Q
3	2	Andrea Purica	Venezuela	11.35	Q
4	1	Marileidy Paulino	Dominican Republic	11.39	Q, PB
5	2	Jura Levy	Jamaica	11.47	Q
6	1	Shenel Crooke	Saint Kitts and Nevis	11.52	Q
7	1	Tahesia Harrigan-Scott	British Virgin Islands	11.57	q, SB
8	2	Yasmin Woodruff	Panama	11.60	q, SB
9	2	Mariely Sánchez	Dominican Republic	11.62	
10	2	LaVerne Jones	United States Virgin Islands	11.69	
11	1	Gemima Joseph	French Guiana	11.80	
12	1	Zakiyah Denoon	Trinidad and Tobago	11.83	
13	2	Geylis Montes	Cuba	11.86	
14	2	Tracy Joseph	Costa Rica	11.89	
15	1	Nia Jack	United States Virgin Islands	11.93	
16	1	Taahira Butterfield	Bermuda	11.93	

Final – July 30
Wind: +2.3 m/s

Rank	Lane	Name	Nationality	Time	Notes
1st place, gold medalist(s)	4	Jonielle Smith	Jamaica	11.04	
2nd place, silver medalist(s)	5	Khalifa St. Fort	Trinidad and Tobago	11.15	
3rd place, bronze medalist(s)	3	Andrea Purica	Venezuela	11.32	
4	6	Marileidy Paulino	Dominican Republic	11.33	
5	7	Jura Levy	Jamaica	11.52	
6	8	Shenel Crooke	Saint Kitts and Nevis	11.53	
7	2	Tahesia Harrigan-Scott	British Virgin Islands	11.69	
8	1	Yasmin Woodruff	Panama	11.70	

=== 200 meters ===
Heats – July 31
Wind:
Heat 1: +1.5 m/s, Heat 2: +0.8 m/s, Heat 3: +0.3 m/s

Rank	Heat	Name	Nationality	Time	Notes
1	3	Marileidy Paulino	Dominican Republic	22.87	Q, NR
2	1	Sashalee Forbes	Jamaica	22.99	Q
3	2	Jodean Williams	Jamaica	23.04	Q
4	2	Semoy Hackett	Trinidad and Tobago	23.40	Q
5	2	Gemima Joseph	French Guiana	23.64	Q
6	1	Adriana Rodríguez	Cuba	23.66	Q, PB
7	3	Kayelle Clarke	Trinidad and Tobago	23.90	Q
8	3	LaVerne Jones	United States Virgin Islands	24.01	Q
9	2	Tracy Joseph	Costa Rica	24.08	Q
10	3	Jenea McCammon	Guyana	24.17	Q, PB
11	1	Nercely Soto	Venezuela	24.31	Q
12	2	Akia Guerrier	Turks and Caicos Islands	24.82	q
13	1	Sunayna Wahi	Suriname	25.27	Q
14	3	Valeria Lezana	Guatemala	25.84	q, PB
	2	Yasmin Woodruff	Panama	DQ	R163.3a
	2	Mariely Sánchez	Dominican Republic	DQ	R162.7
	1	Rosa Baltazar	Guatemala	DNS	
	1	Nia Jack	United States Virgin Islands	DNS	
	3	Nediam Vargas	Venezuela	DNS	

Semifinals – July 31
Wind:
Heat 1: +0.3 m/s, Heat 2: +0.4 m/s

Rank	Heat	Name	Nationality	Time	Notes
1	1	Jodean Williams	Jamaica	22.88	Q, PB
2	1	Marileidy Paulino	Dominican Republic	22.98	Q
3	1	Semoy Hackett	Trinidad and Tobago	23.01	Q
4	2	Sashalee Forbes	Jamaica	23.02	Q
5	2	Kayelle Clarke	Trinidad and Tobago	23.57	Q
6	2	Adriana Rodríguez	Cuba	23.65	Q, PB
7	1	Gemima Joseph	French Guiana	23.74	q
8	2	LaVerne Jones	United States Virgin Islands	23.93	q
9	2	Jenea McCammon	Guyana	24.02	PB
10	2	Tracy Joseph	Costa Rica	24.34	
	1	Sunayna Wahi	Suriname	DNF	
	1	Nercely Soto	Venezuela	DQ	R162.7
	1	Akia Guerrier	Turks and Caicos Islands	DNS	
	2	Valeria Lezana	Guatemala	DNS	

Final – August 1
Wind: +0.6 m/s

Rank	Lane	Name	Nationality	Time	Notes
1st place, gold medalist(s)	4	Sashalee Forbes	Jamaica	22.80	SB
2nd place, silver medalist(s)	7	Semoy Hackett	Trinidad and Tobago	22.95	
3rd place, bronze medalist(s)	6	Jodean Williams	Jamaica	22.96	
4	5	Marileidy Paulino	Dominican Republic	23.04	
5	3	Kayelle Clarke	Trinidad and Tobago	23.54	
6	8	Adriana Rodríguez	Cuba	23.63	PB
7	2	Gemima Joseph	French Guiana	23.89	
8	1	LaVerne Jones	United States Virgin Islands	24.29	

=== 400 meters ===
Heats – July 30

Rank	Heat	Name	Nationality	Time	Notes
1	1	Tiffany James	Jamaica	53.00	Q
2	2	Derri-Ann Hill	Jamaica	53.17	Q
3	1	Fiordaliza Cofil	Dominican Republic	53.52	Q
4	1	Ashley Kelly	British Virgin Islands	53.52	Q
5	2	Kanika Beckles	Grenada	53.62	Q
6	2	Gilda Casanova	Cuba	54.11	Q
7	2	Milagros Durán	Dominican Republic	54.14	q
8	1	Desire Bermúdez	Costa Rica	54.40	q
9	1	Jennifer Padilla	Colombia	54.51	
10	2	Kineke Alexander	Saint Vincent and the Grenadines	54.78	
11	2	Lisa-Anne Barrow	Barbados	55.31	
12	2	Irma Harris	Costa Rica	55.78	
13	1	Pamela Milano	Venezuela	56.36	

Final – August 1

Rank	Lane	Name	Nationality	Time	Notes
1st place, gold medalist(s)	4	Tiffany James	Jamaica	52.35	
2nd place, silver medalist(s)	5	Fiordaliza Cofil	Dominican Republic	52.72	SB
3rd place, bronze medalist(s)	6	Derri-Ann Hill	Jamaica	53.30	
4	3	Kanika Beckles	Grenada	53.75	
5	7	Ashley Kelly	British Virgin Islands	53.84	
6	1	Milagros Durán	Dominican Republic	53.88	
7	2	Desire Bermúdez	Costa Rica	53.91	SB
8	8	Gilda Casanova	Cuba	55.38	

=== 800 meters ===
Heats – July 29

Rank	Heat	Name	Nationality	Time	Notes
1	2	Rose Mary Almanza	Cuba	2:04.46	Q
2	2	Alena Brooks	Trinidad and Tobago	2:05.29	Q
3	1	Sonia Gaskin	Barbados	2:05.50	Q
4	1	Simoya Campbell	Jamaica	2:05.52	Q
5	1	Alethia Marrero	Puerto Rico	2:05.69	Q
6	1	Mariela Luisa Real	Mexico	2:06.32	q
7	2	Fellan Ferguson	Jamaica	2:06.36	Q
8	2	Sade Sealy	Barbados	2:06.93	q
9	1	Rosangelica Escobar	Colombia	2:08.16	
	2	Priscila Morales	Puerto Rico	DQ	R163.3a

Final – July 30

Rank	Name	Nationality	Time	Notes
1st place, gold medalist(s)	Rose Mary Almanza	Cuba	2:01.63	
2nd place, silver medalist(s)	Alena Brooks	Trinidad and Tobago	2:02.26	
3rd place, bronze medalist(s)	Sonia Gaskin	Barbados	2:03.13	SB
4	Simoya Campbell	Jamaica	2:03.16	
5	Alethia Marrero	Puerto Rico	2:04.00	
6	Fellan Ferguson	Jamaica	2:04.13	
7	Mariela Luisa Real	Mexico	2:05.38	
8	Sade Sealy	Barbados	2:06.75	

=== 1500 meters ===
August 1

Rank	Name	Nationality	Time	Notes
1st place, gold medalist(s)	Rose Mary Almanza	Cuba	4:22.14	SB
2nd place, silver medalist(s)	Angelin Figueroa	Puerto Rico	4:22.52	
3rd place, bronze medalist(s)	Rosibel García	Colombia	4:23.43	SB
4	Andrea Ferris	Panama	4:25.04	
5	Muriel Coneo	Colombia	4:25.72	SB
6	Ana Cristina Narváez	Mexico	4:26.45	
7	Arletis Thaureaux	Cuba	4:26.55	
8	Viviana Aroche	Guatemala	4:41.09	SB

=== 5000 meters ===
August 1

Rank	Name	Nationality	Time	Notes
1st place, gold medalist(s)	Muriel Coneo	Colombia	16:13.47	
2nd place, silver medalist(s)	Beverly Ramos	Puerto Rico	16:14.04	
3rd place, bronze medalist(s)	Brenda Flores	Mexico	16:16.71	SB
4	Carolina Tabares	Colombia	16:26.06	
5	Úrsula Patricia Sánchez	Mexico	16:28.82	
6	Rolanda Bell	Panama	16:56.41	

=== 10,000 meters ===
July 29

Rank	Name	Nationality	Time	Notes
1st place, gold medalist(s)	Úrsula Patricia Sánchez	Mexico	33:41.48	GR
2nd place, silver medalist(s)	Beverly Ramos	Puerto Rico	33:46.99	SB
3rd place, bronze medalist(s)	Vianey de la Rosa	Mexico	34:10.75	
4	Carolina Tabares	Colombia	34:21.05	
5	Kellys Arias	Colombia	35:01.57	PB
6	Soranyi Rodríguez	Dominican Republic	36:02.87	
7	Viviana Aroche	Guatemala	38:50.85	

=== Marathon ===
August 3

Rank	Name	Nationality	Time	Notes
1st place, gold medalist(s)	Madaí Pérez	Mexico	2:57:55	
2nd place, silver medalist(s)	Dailín Belmonte	Cuba	2:59:09	
3rd place, bronze medalist(s)	Angie Orjuela	Colombia	2:59:49	
4	Jenny Méndez	Costa Rica	3:03:00	
5	Yudileyvis Castillo	Cuba	3:04:29	
6	Adriana Zuñiga	Mexico	3:06:24	

=== 100 meters hurdles ===
Heats – July 30
Wind:
Heat 1: +2.8 m/s, Heat 2: +1.7 m/s

Rank	Heat	Name	Nationality	Time	Notes
1	1	Andrea Vargas	Costa Rica	12.75	Q
2	2	Vanessa Clerveaux	Haiti	13.05	Q, PB
3	2	Jeanine Williams	Jamaica	13.06	Q
4	2	Génesis Romero	Venezuela	13.12	Q
5	1	Brigitte Merlano	Colombia	13.20	Q
6	1	Kierre Beckles	Barbados	13.27	Q
7	2	Jenea McCammon	Guyana	13.27	q, NR
8	2	Eliecith Palacios	Colombia	13.28	q, SB
9	2	Keily Pérez	Cuba	13.57	
10	1	Kieshonna Brooks	Saint Kitts and Nevis	13.58	
11	1	Deya Erickson	British Virgin Islands	13.69	
12	1	Mulern Jean	Haiti	13.75	
13	2	Kathel Bapte	Martinique	13.89	SB
14	1	Greisys Roble	Cuba	13.93	
	1	Nickiesha Wilson	Jamaica	DNS	

Final – July 31
Wind:
+1.5 m/s

Rank	Lane	Name	Nationality	Time	Notes
1st place, gold medalist(s)	3	Andrea Vargas	Costa Rica	12.90	PB
2nd place, silver medalist(s)	6	Vanessa Clerveaux	Haiti	13.07	
3rd place, bronze medalist(s)	4	Jeanine Williams	Jamaica	13.11	
4	8	Génesis Romero	Venezuela	13.18	
5	5	Brigitte Merlano	Colombia	13.24	SB
6	1	Eliecith Palacios	Colombia	13.28	
7	2	Jenea McCammon	Guyana	13.40	
8	7	Kierre Beckles	Barbados	13.48	

=== 400 meters hurdles ===
Heats – July 29

Rank	Heat	Name	Nationality	Time	Notes
1	1	Rushell Clayton	Jamaica	55.45	Q
2	1	Zudikey Rodríguez	Mexico	55.47	Q, PB
3	2	Ronda Whyte	Jamaica	55.77	Q
4	2	Zurian Hechavarría	Cuba	56.05	Q
5	1	Sparkle McKnight	Trinidad and Tobago	56.41	Q
6	1	Melissa Gonzalez	Colombia	56.48	q
7	1	Gianna Woodruff	Panama	56.94	q
8	2	Grace Claxton	Puerto Rico	56.95	Q
9	2	Janeil Bellille	Trinidad and Tobago	57.25	
10	2	Daniela Rojas	Costa Rica	57.96	PB
11	2	Katrina Seymour	Bahamas	58.37	
12	1	Tia-Adana Belle	Barbados	58.42	
13	1	Sharolyn Scott	Costa Rica	1:00.46	SB
14	2	Jessica Gelibert	Haiti	1:04.87	

Final – July 31

Rank	Lane	Name	Nationality	Time	Notes
1st place, gold medalist(s)	6	Ronda Whyte	Jamaica	55.08	
2nd place, silver medalist(s)	5	Zudikey Rodríguez	Mexico	55.11	PB
3rd place, bronze medalist(s)	3	Zurian Hechavarría	Cuba	55.13	PB
4	4	Rushell Clayton	Jamaica	55.30	
5	7	Sparkle McKnight	Trinidad and Tobago	55.56	
6	2	Gianna Woodruff	Panama	55.60	AR
7	1	Melissa Gonzalez	Colombia	56.57	
8	8	Grace Claxton	Puerto Rico	56.77	

=== 3000 meters steeplechase ===
August 2

Rank	Name	Nationality	Time	Notes
1st place, gold medalist(s)	Ana Cristina Narváez	Mexico	10:00.01	SB
2nd place, silver medalist(s)	Beverly Ramos	Puerto Rico	10:07.71	
3rd place, bronze medalist(s)	Andrea Ferris	Panama	10:18.92	SB
4	Rolanda Bell	Panama	10:30.47	
5	Alondra Negrón	Puerto Rico	10:58.47	
	Viviana Aroche	Guatemala	DNS	
	Muriel Coneo	Colombia	DNS	

=== 4 × 100 meters relay ===
August 2

Rank	Lane	Nation	Competitors	Time	Notes
1st place, gold medalist(s)	5	Jamaica	Jura Levy, Sherone Simpson, Jonielle Smith, Natasha Morrison	43.41	
2nd place, silver medalist(s)	3	Trinidad and Tobago	Khalifa St. Fort, Zakiyah Denoon, Reyare Thomas, Semoy Hackett	43.61	
3rd place, bronze medalist(s)	2	Dominican Republic	Mariely Sánchez, Marileidy Paulino, Anabel Medina, Estrella de Aza	43.68	SB
4	7	Colombia	Angie Saray González, Darlenys Obregón, Evelyn Rivera, Eliecith Palacios	44.19	SB
5	6	Cuba	Geylis Montes, Adriana Rodríguez, Marelys Alfonso, Evelyn Cipriano	44.44	
6	4	Venezuela	Pamela Milano, Andrea Purica, Génesis Romero, Nercely Soto	45.71	

=== 4 × 400 meters relay ===
August 2

Rank	Nation	Competitors	Time	Notes
1st place, gold medalist(s)	Cuba	Zurian Hechavarría, Rose Mary Almanza, Gilda Casanova, Roxana Gómez	3:29.48	GR
2nd place, silver medalist(s)	Jamaica	Derri-Ann Hill, Tiffany James, Sonikqua Walker, Junelle Bromfield	3:30.67	
3rd place, bronze medalist(s)	Colombia	Eliana Chávez, Rosangélica Escobar, Melissa Gonzalez, Jennifer Padilla	3:32.61	
4	Dominican Republic	Fiordaliza Cofil, Anabel Medina, Milagros Durán, Evilin Del Carmen	3:33.64	NR
5	Puerto Rico	Grace Claxton, Alethia Marrero, Gabriella Scott, Pariis García	3:33.65	
6	Costa Rica	Irma Harris, Sharolyn Scott, Daniela Rojas, Desire Bermúdez	3:40.23	NR

=== High jump ===
August 2

Rank	Name	Nationality	1.60	1.65	1.70	1.73	1.76	1.79	1.82	1.84	1.86	1.88	1.90	1.95	Result	Notes
1st place, gold medalist(s)	Levern Spencer	Saint Lucia	–	–	–	–	–	–	o	–	o	–	xo	x	1.90	
2nd place, silver medalist(s)	Ximena Esquivel	Mexico	–	–	–	–	o	o	xo	xxo	xo	xxx			1.86	
3rd place, bronze medalist(s)	María Fernanda Murillo	Colombia	–	–	–	o	–	o	–	xxo	xxo	xxx			1.86	
4	Priscilla Frederick	Antigua and Barbuda	–	–	–	o	o	o	o	xxx					1.82	
5	Saniel Atkinson-Grier	Jamaica	–	–	–	–	o	xo	o	xxx					1.82	
6	Rosarita Antonia	Curaçao	–	o	xo	o	xo	xxo	xo	xxx					1.82	PB
7	Marysabel Senyu	Dominican Republic	–	o	–	o	–	xxo	xxo	xxx					1.82	PB
8	Isis Guerra	Cuba	–	–	–	–	o	xo	–	xxx					1.79	
9	Amanda Vergara	Venezuela	–	–	–	xo	o	xxx							1.76	
10	Yashira Rhymer	United States Virgin Islands	o	xo	o	xo	xxx								1.73	
11	Sakari Famous	Bermuda	–	o	xxx										1.65	
	Wanetta Kirby	United States Virgin Islands	–	xxx											NM	
	Abigail Obando	Costa Rica	xxx												NM	
	Jeannine Allard-Saint-Albin	Martinique													DNS	
	Yorgelis Rodríguez	Cuba													DNS	

=== Pole vault ===
July 29

Rank	Name	Nationality	3.30	3.45	3.60	3.75	3.85	3.95	4.05	4.10	4.20	4.40	4.50	4.60	4.70	Result	Notes
1st place, gold medalist(s)	Yarisley Silva	Cuba	–	–	–	–	–	–	–	–	–	o	–	o	o	4.70	GR
2nd place, silver medalist(s)	Robeilys Peinado	Venezuela	–	–	–	–	–	–	–	–	o	o	o	xxx		4.50	
3rd place, bronze medalist(s)	Lisa María Salomón	Cuba	–	–	–	–	o	–	o	o	xxx					4.10	=PB
4	Katherine Castillo	Colombia	–	–	–	–	xxo	–	o	xxx						4.05	PB
5	Yaritza Díaz	Puerto Rico	–	–	–	–	o	–	xxx							3.85	
5	Tiziana Ruiz	Mexico	–	–	–	–	o	xxx								3.85	
7	Carmen Villanueva	Venezuela	–	–	o	o	xxx									3.75	
8	Andrea Velasco	El Salvador	xo	xo	xxx											3.45	SB
	Carmelita Correa	Mexico	–	–	–	–	–	–	xxx							NM	

=== Long jump ===
Jule 30

Rank	Name	Nationality	#1	#2	#3	#4	#5	#6	Result	Notes
1st place, gold medalist(s)	Caterine Ibargüen	Colombia	6.56	6.51	6.46	6.74w	x	6.83w	6.83w	
2nd place, silver medalist(s)	Chantel Malone	British Virgin Islands	6.41	x	6.34	6.51w	6.35w	6.52	6.52	SB
3rd place, bronze medalist(s)	Alysbeth Félix	Puerto Rico	x	x	6.20w	6.45w	6.12	6.40	6.45w	=PB
4	Jessamyn Sauceda	Mexico	x	6.15	6.44w	6.20	6.43w	6.38	6.44w	
5	Nathalee Aranda	Panama	4.43w	x	6.33	6.18	6.31w	6.43w	6.43w	
6	Sandisha Antoine	Saint Lucia	x	6.28w	6.04w	6.23w	6.29w	x	6.29w	
7	Irisdaymi Herrera	Cuba	5.74	x	6.20w	x	5.99	6.08	6.20w	
8	Flor Álvarez	Dominican Republic	6.19	6.16	6.10	6.04	6.10w	6.10w	6.19	
9	Daniella Sacama-Isidore	Martinique	x	6.19	x				6.19	
10	Thelma Fuentes	Guatemala	5.75w	6.07	6.12w				6.12w	
11	Kala Penn	British Virgin Islands	6.04	5.85	x				6.04	SB
12	Paula Álvarez	Cuba	6.00	x	x				6.00	
13	Wanetta Kirby	United States Virgin Islands	5.81	5.98	5.73				5.98	
14	Ayanna Alexander	Trinidad and Tobago	5.61	5.83w	5.45w				5.83w	
	Tissanna Hickling	Jamaica							DNS	

=== Triple jump ===
August 1

Rank	Name	Nationality	#1	#2	#3	#4	#5	#6	Result	Notes
1st place, gold medalist(s)	Caterine Ibargüen	Colombia	14.66	14.74w	14.79	14.76w	14.92	x	14.92	GR
2nd place, silver medalist(s)	Yosiris Urrutia	Colombia	x	14.47	x	x	x	14.48w	14.48w	SB
3rd place, bronze medalist(s)	Liadagmis Povea	Cuba	14.01	14.44w	x	x	13.69	14.25	14.44w	
4	Ana Lucia José	Dominican Republic	13.80	13.89	14.13w	13.87	x	14.06	14.13w	
5	Sandisha Antoine	Saint Lucia	13.53	13.91	13.85w	13.40w	13.66w	13.88w	13.91	NR
6	Ivonne Rangel	Mexico	13.51	13.80w	13.67	x	x	11.91w	13.80w	
7	Davisleydi Velazco	Cuba	x	13.52	x	13.30	x	13.13	13.52	
8	Thelma Fuentes	Guatemala	13.31	x	12.99w	13.48w	12.92	13.41	13.48w	
9	Ayanna Alexander	Trinidad and Tobago	13.18	13.15	x				13.18	
10	Estefany Cruz	Guatemala	x	13.13	x				13.13	
11	Thea LaFond	Dominica	13.02w	x	x				13.02w	
12	Kala Penn	British Virgin Islands	12.65w	x	x				12.65w	

=== Shot put ===
August 1

Rank	Name	Nationality	#1	#2	#3	#4	#5	#6	Result	Notes
1st place, gold medalist(s)	Cleopatra Borel	Trinidad and Tobago	17.44	17.63	18.03	x	18.14	x	18.14	
2nd place, silver medalist(s)	Yaniuvis López	Cuba	x	17.74	18.03	x	17.34	17.95	18.03	
3rd place, bronze medalist(s)	María Fernanda Orozco	Mexico	x	17.42	17.88	17.43	17.09	x	17.88	PB
4	Ahimara Espinoza	Venezuela	16.00	17.49	17.77	x	x	17.17	17.77	
5	Anyela Rivas	Colombia	16.26	16.73	16.29	x	15.99	16.27	16.73	
6	Portious Warren	Trinidad and Tobago	15.69	16.22	15.80	x	15.56	15.84	16.22	
7	Gleneve Grange	Jamaica	14.35	15.38	15.60	15.73	15.44	x	15.73	
8	Trevia Gumbs	British Virgin Islands	12.41	x	x	x	13.23	x	13.23	

=== Discus throw ===
July 31

Rank	Name	Nationality	#1	#2	#3	#4	#5	#6	Result	Notes
1st place, gold medalist(s)	Yaime Pérez	Cuba	63.76	66.00	65.87	64.35	63.36	64.47	66.00	GR
2nd place, silver medalist(s)	Denia Caballero	Cuba	64.99	65.10	62.32	61.18	x	x	65.10	
3rd place, bronze medalist(s)	Shaniece Love	Jamaica	58.33	48.46	x	x	58.10	58.40	58.40	PB
4	Alma Pollorena	Mexico	47.73	54.22	53.70	53.72	54.07	52.99	54.22	
5	Aixa Middleton	Panama	53.41	x	53.97	49.54	50.07	52.80	53.97	SB
6	Isheka Binns	Jamaica	52.56	x	53.58	50.20	x	x	53.58	
7	Portious Warren	Trinidad and Tobago	48.41	51.71	x	x	51.56	x	51.71	
8	Lacee Barnes	Cayman Islands	x	x	46.00	x	46.25	x	46.25	
9	Tiara Derosa	Bermuda	x	45.45	x				45.45	
10	Tynelle Gumbs	British Virgin Islands	43.75	45.12	45.15				45.15	
11	Latoya Gilding	Trinidad and Tobago	43.50	x	42.80				43.50	
	Trevia Gumbs	British Virgin Islands	x	x	x				NM	

=== Hammer throw ===
July 29

Rank	Name	Nationality	#1	#2	#3	#4	#5	#6	Result	Notes
1st place, gold medalist(s)	Rosa Rodríguez	Venezuela	65.76	66.80	65.15	67.91	x	66.99	67.91	
2nd place, silver medalist(s)	Elianis Despaigne	Cuba	61.83	x	x	59.32	64.12	64.40	64.40	
3rd place, bronze medalist(s)	Yaritza Martínez	Cuba	56.14	60.85	57.44	60.66	60.84	61.44	61.44	
4	Johana Moreno	Colombia	60.30	60.83	60.01	59.28	57.56	x	60.83	
5	Tynelle Gumbs	British Virgin Islands	x	55.07	x	x	56.54	x	56.54	
6	Sonja Moreno	Guatemala	47.54	49.36	51.14	49.81	48.18	49.69	51.14	

=== Javelin throw ===
August 1

Rank	Name	Nationality	#1	#2	#3	#4	#5	#6	Result	Notes
1st place, gold medalist(s)	María Lucelly Murillo	Colombia	56.04	57.66	x	x	x	59.54	59.54	
2nd place, silver medalist(s)	Coraly Ortiz	Puerto Rico	52.15	56.27	x	51.05	x	55.10	56.27	
3rd place, bronze medalist(s)	Yulenmis Aguilar	Cuba	55.60	x	51.84	51.15	x	49.59	55.60	
4	Dalila Rugama	Nicaragua	45.87	x	49.84	50.30	49.42	48.12	50.30	SB
5	Mailen Brooks	Cuba	45.72	46.54	46.77	45.79	x	45.76	46.77	
6	Kateema Riettie	Jamaica	40.88	41.81	x	x	38.51	42.23	42.23	
7	Sofia Alonso	Guatemala	36.13	40.09	35.79	36.36	36.23	39.23	40.09	

=== Heptathlon ===
July 31 – August 1

The highest mark recorded in each event is highlighted in yellow

Rank	Athlete	Nationality	100m H	HJ	SP	200m	LJ	JT	800m	Points	Notes
1st place, gold medalist(s)	Yorgelis Rodríguez	Cuba	13.60w	1.83	14.23	24.56	6.23	48.96	2:15.50	6436	GR
2nd place, silver medalist(s)	Evelis Aguilar	Colombia	13.92w	1.77	13.64	23.95	6.47w	43.01	2:16.18	6285	AR
3rd place, bronze medalist(s)	Luisaris Toledo	Venezuela	14.40w	1.62	12.37	24.63	6.12w	43.77	2:12.27	5848	NR
4	Martha Araújo	Colombia	13.89	1.68	11.47	24.95	5.91	44.94	2:20.31	5744	PB
5	Alysbeth Félix	Puerto Rico	14.40w	1.68	11.06	24.68	6.19	38.41	2:18.68	5655	
6	Ana María Porras	Costa Rica	14.77	1.62	9.83	26.83	5.49	32.03	2:24.39	4852	
7	Jeannine Allard-Saint-Albin	Martinique	15.81	1.65	9.46	27.07	5.58w	28.31	3:01.17	4255	
	Tyra Gittens	Trinidad and Tobago	13.78w	1.74	12.67	24.31	6.12w	30.02	DNS	DNF	
	Khemani Roberts	Trinidad and Tobago	15.10	1.68	10.74	25.16	5.41	NM	DNS	DNF	
