= Leslain Baird =

Guyanese javelin thrower

Personal information
- Full name: Leslain Baird
- Born: May 9, 1987 (age 39)

Sport
- Country: Guyana
- Sport: Athletics
- Event: Javelin throw
Medal record
Men's athletics
Representing Guyana
Pan American Games
Bronze medal – third place	2023 Santiago	Javelin throw
South American Games
Silver medal – second place	2018 Cochabamba	Javelin throw
- Updated on 18 April 2019

Leslain Baird (born 9 May 1987) is a Guyanese athlete who competes in javelin throw. He is the national record holder in the event since 23 June 2013, when he broke the previous record that Lionel Schultz has held since September 18, 1985.

== Personal best ==
Event	Result	Venue	Date
Javelin throw	78.65 m	(Bolivia) Cochabamba	6 June 2018

== International competitions ==
Year	Competition	Venue	Position	Event	Notes
Representing Guyana
2011	Central American and Caribbean Championships	Mayagüez, Puerto Rico	-	Javelin throw	DNS
2013	South American Championships	Cartagena, Colombia	8th	Javelin throw	64.94 m
2018	Commonwealth Games	Gold Coast, Australia	14th (q)	Javelin throw	74.27 m
2018	South American Games	Cochabamba, Bolivia	2nd	Javelin throw	78.65 m NR
2018	Central American and Caribbean Games	Barranquilla, Colombia	4th	Javelin throw	74.72 m
2019	South American Championships	Lima, Peru	4th	Javelin throw	74.43 m
2023	Central American and Caribbean Games	San Salvador, El Salvador	4th	Javelin throw	75.86 m
2023	Pan American Games	Santiago, Chile	3rd	Javelin throw	78.23 m
2025	South American Championships	Mar del Plata, Argentina	8th	Javelin throw	69.87 m
2025	Islamic Solidarity Games	Riyadh, Saudi Arabia	4th	Javelin throw	72.26 m
2026	South American Games	Santa Fe, Argentina	4th	Javelin throw	77.69 m
