= Athletics at the 2023 Pan American Games – Men's javelin throw =

Men's javelin throw at the 2023 Pan American Games
- Venue: Julio Martínez National Stadium
- Dates: November 4
- Competitors: 12 from 8 nations
- Winning distance: 79.65

Medalists
Gold medal	Curtis Thompson	United States
Silver medal	Pedro Nunes	Brazil
Bronze medal	Leslain Baird	Guyana

The men's javelin throw competition of the athletics events at the 2023 Pan American Games was held on November 4 at the Julio Martínez National Stadium of Santiago, Chile.

== Records ==
Prior to this competition, the existing world and Pan American Games records were as follows:

World record	Jan Zelezny (CZE)	98.48	Jena, Germany	May 25, 1996
Pan American Games record	Anderson Peters (GRN)	87.31	Lima, Peru	August 10, 2019

== Schedule ==
Date	Time	Round
November 4, 2023	20:20	Final

== Results ==
All times shown are in seconds.

KEY:	NR	National record	PB	Personal best	SB	Seasonal best	DQ	Disqualified

=== Final ===
The results were as follows:

Rank	Name	Nationality	#1	#2	#3	#4	#5	#6	Mark	Notes
1st place, gold medalist(s)	Curtis Thompson	United States	78.72	71.98	75.84	77.40	X	79.65	79.65	
2nd place, silver medalist(s)	Pedro Henrique Rodrigues	Brazil	76.74	78.45	72.98	76.32	77.16	X	78.45	
3rd place, bronze medalist(s)	Leslain Baird	Guyana	72.87	73.48	68.37	78.23	74.68	72.43	78.23	
4	Capers Williamson	United States	76.29	73.13	X	72.67	X	X	76.29	
5	David Carreón	Mexico	74.34	74.06	73.43	74.47	71.08	69.68	74.47	
6	Billy Julio	Colombia	72.22	71.54	71.21	71.79	70.66	73.35	73.35	
7	Antonio Ortíz	Paraguay	71.02	67.03	70.19	71.51	71.52	X	71.52	
8	Carlos Armenta	Mexico	68.07	67.99	69.00	67.81	X	66.97	69.00	
9	Luiz Maurício da Silva	Brazil	66.18	68.26	68.20				68.20	
10	Elvis Graham	Jamaica	64.11	63.30	67.86				67.86	
11	Francisco Muse	Chile	67.56	62.52	61.97				67.56	
12	Zaavan Richards	Jamaica	60.27	X	X				60.27	
