= Natricia Hooper =

Guyanese triple jumper

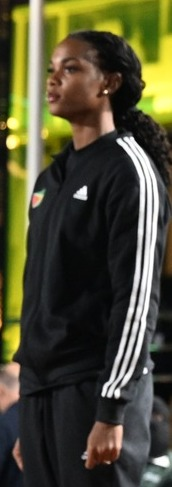

Personal information
- Born: 28 November 1998 (age 27)

Sport
- Sport: Athletics
- Event: Triple jump

Achievements and titles
- Personal bests: Triple jump: 14.10 m (Clemson, 2022) NR
Medal record
Representing Guyana
Women's athletics
South American Championships
Bronze medal – third place	2025 Mar del Plata	Triple jump
Carifta Games Junior (U20)
Gold medal – first place	2017 Willemstad	Triple jump

Natricia Hooper (born 24 November 1998) is a triple jumper from Guyana. She is the Guyanese national record holder. She won a bronze medal in the triple jump at the 2025 South American Championships.

== NCAA ==
Hooper grew up in Guyana but moved to the United States in 2017. She attended Essex County College in New Jersey before gaining a scholarship to the University of Florida, joining in early 2019. She finished third at the 2019 SEC Indoor Championships with a personal best jump, before suffering an ACL knee ligament injury which required surgery. After recovering her fitness she broke the Guyanese national record at the SEC Championships with her first round jump of 13.92m, before returning the fifth round and making a jump of 13.93m. She qualified for the NCAA Outdoor Championships in 2021. In January 2022, she set a new Guyanese national record with a jump of 14.10 metres competing indoors in Clemson.

== Professional career ==
She won the triple jump at the 2017 CARIFTA Games in Curacao with a jump of 13.08 metres. She finished eighth in the triple jump at the 2018 Commonwealth Games on the Gold Coast in Queensland, Australia with a personal best 13.15 metres.

In April 2022, she set a new Guyanese national outdoor record for the triple jump with a leap of 14.03m.

She jumped 14.05 metres at the Florida Relays in April 2025. She won a bronze medal in the triple jump at the 2025 South American Championships in Argentina with a jump of 13.64m, later that month.

== Personal life ==
Her sister Natrena Hopper has represented Guyana in the high jump in international athletics competition.
