= Aliyah Abrams =

Guyanese sprinter (born 1997)

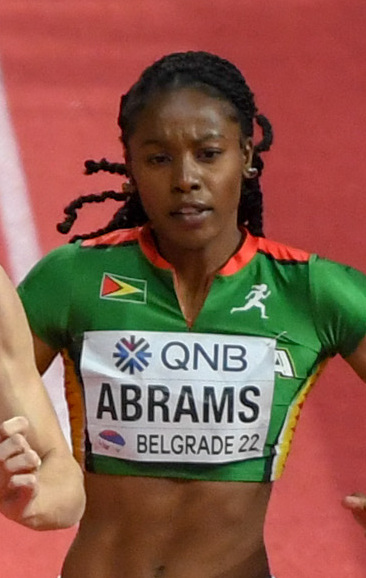
- Aliyah Abrams in 2022

Personal information
- Full name: Aliyah Nicola Abrams
- Nationality: Guyanese
- Born: 3 April 1997 (age 29) Brooklyn, New York, United States
- Height: 1.63 m (5 ft 4 in)

Sport
- Country: Guyana
- Sport: Athletics
- Event: 400 metres
- College team: South Carolina Gamecocks

Achievements and titles
- Personal bests: 400 m: 50.20 2023; Indoors; 400 m: 51.57i AR 2022

Aliyah Nicola Abrams (born 3 April 1997) is a Guyanese sprinter specialising in the 400 metres. She placed fifth in the 400 metres at the 2022 World Indoor Championships and set the South American indoor record. She is a three-time Olympian.

== Career ==
Abrams joined the South Carolina Gamecocks track and field team in 2016. She represented Guyana at the 2016 Summer Olympics in the 400 metres race; her time of 52.79 seconds in the heats did not qualify her for the semifinals. At the 2017 NCAA Indoor Championships, she finished ninth with the South Carolina 4 × 400 meters relay team and earned second-team All-America honors.

Abrams finished second in the 400 metres at the 2019 NCAA Indoor Championships. She then finished third with the 4 x 400 meter relay team at the 2019 NCAA Outdoor Championships, and she also finished fifth in the 400 metres. She represented Guyana at the 2019 Pan American Games and finished seventh in the 400 metres final. She qualified for the 400 metres semifinals at the 2019 World Championships and placed 16th.

Abrams qualified in her specialist event for the 2020 Tokyo Olympics, where she was eliminated in the semi-finals. She was the opening ceremony flagbearer for Guyana at the 2022 Commonwealth Games. There, she finished 10th in the 400 metres semifinal and did not advance into the final. She them placed fifth in the 400 metres final at the 2022 World Indoor Championships in Belgrade. She had set the South American indoor record of 51.57 seconds during the semifinals. She advanced into the semifinals at the 2022 World Athletics Championships and finished 18th with a time of 51.79.

At the 2023 World Athletics Championships, Abrams finished 26th in the heats and did not advance. She advanced into the final at the 2023 Pan American Games and finished fifth with a time of 52.66. She ran as part of the Guyana Mixed 4 × 400 m relay team at the 2024 World Relays Championships in Nassau, Bahamas. She competed at the 2024 Summer Olympics in the 400 metres but did not advance out of her heat. She was chosen to be a flagbearer at the closing ceremony.

Abrams was a finalist in the 400 metres at the 2025 Islamic Solidarity Games in Riyadh, finishing sixth.

== Personal life ==
Abrams was born in Brooklyn, New York, to Guyanese parents and grew up in Grayson, Georgia. Her sister is fellow athlete Jasmine Abrams. When they both competed at the 2020 Summer Olympics, they were the first siblings to compete for Guyana at the Olympics.

== Personal bests ==
- 100 metres – 11.52 (+1.6 m/s Columbia, United States 2019)
- 200 metres – 23.33 (+0.3 m/s Charleston, United States 2019)
  - 300 metres indoor – 37.09 (Louisville, United States 2022) South American best
- 400 metres – 51.13 (Austin, United States 2019)
  - 400 metres indoor – 51.57 (Belgrade, Serbia 2022) South American record
