= 2022 World Athletics Indoor Championships – Women's 400 metres =

Women's 400 metres at the 2022 World Athletics Indoor Championships
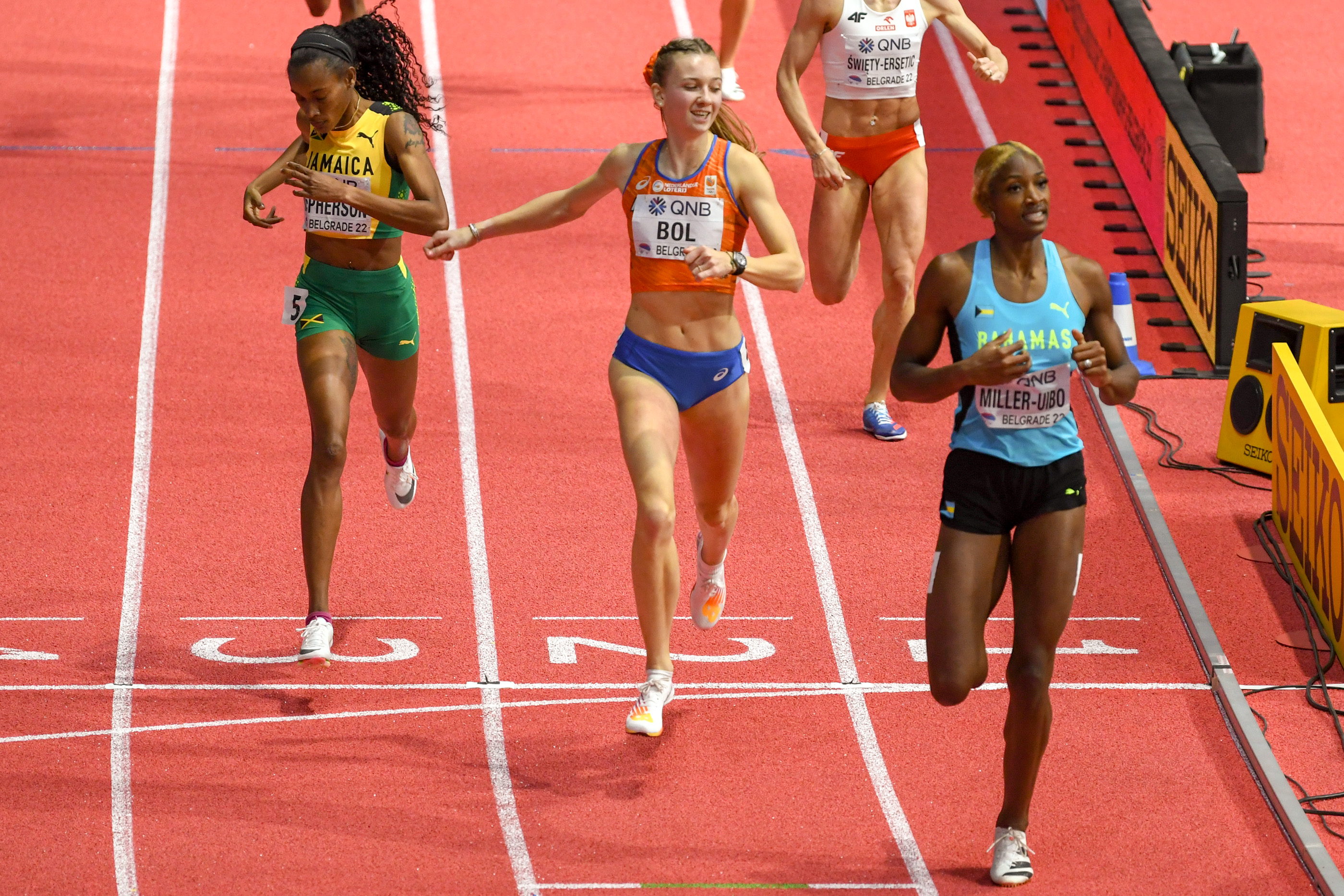
- From right to left: Shaunae Miller-Uibo, Femke Bol, and Stephenie Ann McPherson finishing in the final
- Venue: Štark Arena
- Location: Belgrade, Serbia
- Dates: 18–19 March
- Competitors: 28 from 20 nations
- Winning time: 50.31 s

Medalists
gold medal	Shaunae Miller-Uibo	Bahamas
silver medal	Femke Bol	Netherlands
bronze medal	Stephenie Ann McPherson	Jamaica

The women's 400 metres at the 2022 World Athletics Indoor Championships was held over three rounds at the Štark Arena in Belgrade, Serbia, on 18 and 19 March 2022.

The gold medal was won by Shaunae Miller-Uibo of the Bahamas in 50.31 seconds, the silver medal by Femke Bol of the Netherlands in 50.57 seconds and the bronze medal by Stephenie Ann McPherson of Jamaica in a national record of 50.79 seconds.

== Background ==
At the start of the 2022 championships, Jarmila Kratochvílová of Czechoslovakia held the world record of 49.59 s set in 1982, Olesya Krasnomovets-Forsheva of Russia held the championship record of 50.04 s set in 2006, and Femke Bol had the world leading of the 2022 season up to that time of 50.30 s set on 27 February 2022.

Records before the 2022 World Athletics Indoor Championships
Record	Athlete (Nation)	Time	Location	Date
World indoor record	Jarmila Kratochvílová (TCH)	49.59	Milan, Italy	7 March 1982
Championship record	Olesya Krasnomovets-Forsheva (RUS)	50.04	Moscow, Russia	12 March 2006
World leading	Femke Bol (NED)	50.30	Apeldoorn, Netherlands	27 February 2022

== Qualification ==
Athletes could qualify for the 400 metres by archieving the entry standard of 51.00 s outdoors or 52.90 s indoors from 1 January 2021 to 7 March 2022, by receiving a wild card for the overall winner of the 2021 World Athletics Indoor Tour, or by virtue of their position on the World Athletics Rankings on 9 March 2022 with a target number of 30 athletes.

== Results ==
=== Round 1 ===
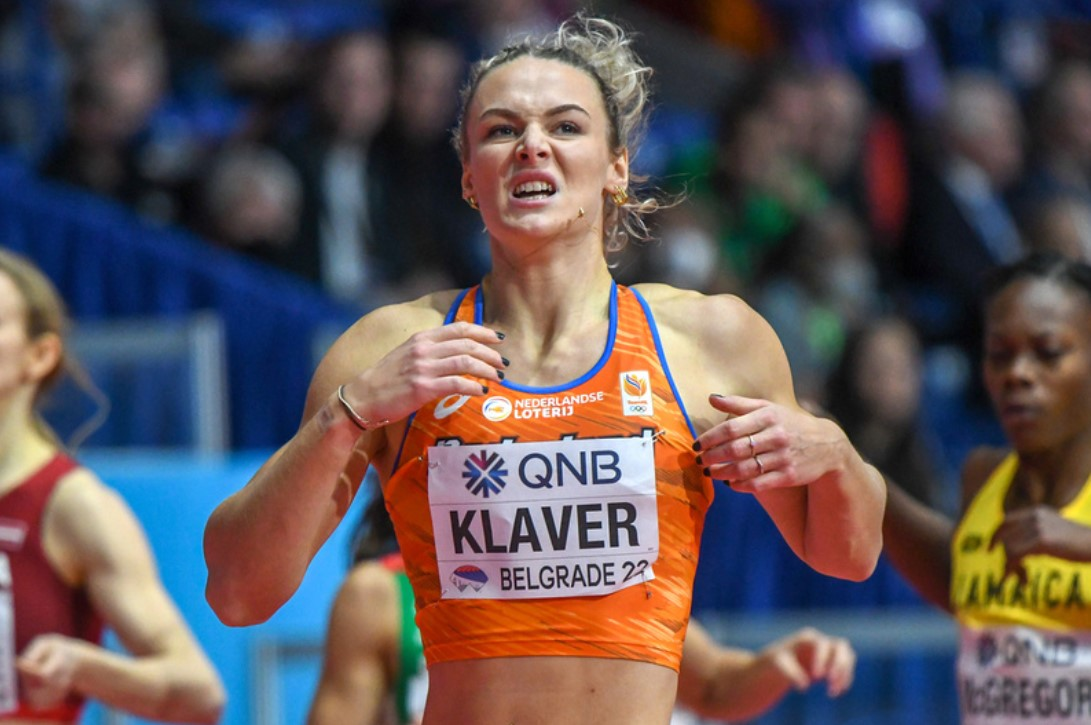
Eventual finalist Lieke Klaver finished second in her first-round heat.

Twenty-six athletes from twenty nations competed in the five heats of round 1 on 18 March, starting at 11:41 (UTC+1) in the morning. Twelve athletes, the first two runners in each heat (Q) and the next two fastest runners (q), qualified for the final. Five runners set season's best times in this first round.

Results of round 1
Rank	Heat	Lane	Name	Nation	Time	Notes
1	2	5	Femke Bol	Netherlands	51.48	Q
2	5	2	Shaunae Miller-Uibo	Bahamas	51.74	Q, SB
3	1	6	Phil Healy	Ireland	51.75	Q
4	5	5	Stephenie Ann McPherson	Jamaica	51.86	Q
5	1	5	Lieke Klaver	Netherlands	51.96	Q
6	5	6	Modesta Justė Morauskaitė	Lithuania	52.11	q
7	4	5	Natalia Kaczmarek	Poland	52.22	Q
8	5	4	Roxana Gómez	Cuba	52.25	q, NR
9	4	4	Aliyah Abrams	Guyana	52.34	Q
10	3	6	Justyna Święty-Ersetic	Poland	52.37	Q
11	4	3	Camille Laus	Belgium	52.51	SB
12	2	6	Ama Pipi	Great Britain	52.53	Q
13	1	4	Sada Williams	Barbados	52.65	
14	2	3	Jessica Beard	United States	52.72	
15	4	6	Lynna Irby	United States	52.78	
16	1	3	Roneisha McGregor	Jamaica	52.89	
17	3	4	Jessie Knight	Great Britain	52.93	Q
18	3	5	Lada Vondrová	Czech Republic	52.94	
19	1	1	Cátia Azevedo	Portugal	53.01	
20	1	2	Gunta Vaičule	Latvia	53.05	SB
21	2	4	Tereza Petržilková	Czech Republic	53.05	
22	4	1	Sara Gallego	Spain	53.13	
23	5	3	Maja Ćirić	Serbia	53.36	
24	3	3	Sophie Becker	Ireland	53.47	
25	4	2	Irini Vasiliou	Greece	53.62	SB
26	3	2	Megan Moss	Bahamas	54.03	
27	2	2	Micha Powell	Canada	54.65	
28	5	1	Yanique Haye-Smith	Turks and Caicos Islands	56.20	

=== Semi-finals ===
Twelve athletes from nine nations competed in the two heats of the semi-finals on 18 March, starting at 18:36 (UTC+1) in the evening. Six athletes, the first three runners in each heat qualified for the final (Q). In the first heat, Stephenie Ann McPherson of Jamaica had a season's best time (SB) and Aliyah Abrams of Guyana set a South American record (AR) of 51.57 s. In the second heat, Shaunae Miller-Uibo of The Bahamas and Jessie Knight of Great Britain and Northern Ireland had season's best times.

Results of semi-finals
Rank	Heat	Lane	Name	Nation	Time	Notes
1	1	4	Stephenie Ann McPherson	Jamaica	51.26	Q, SB
2	1	5	Femke Bol	Netherlands	51.28	Q
3	2	5	Shaunae Miller-Uibo	Bahamas	51.38	Q, SB
4	1	3	Aliyah Abrams	Guyana	51.57	Q, AR
5	2	3	Justyna Święty-Ersetic	Poland	51.67	Q
6	2	4	Lieke Klaver	Netherlands	51.81	Q
7	1	6	Natalia Kaczmarek	Poland	51.87	
8	2	1	Jessie Knight	Great Britain	51.93	SB
9	2	2	Modesta Justė Morauskaitė	Lithuania	52.00	
10	1	2	Roxana Gómez	Cuba	52.28	
11	2	6	Phil Healy	Ireland	52.40	
12	1	1	Ama Pipi	Great Britain	52.95	

=== Final ===
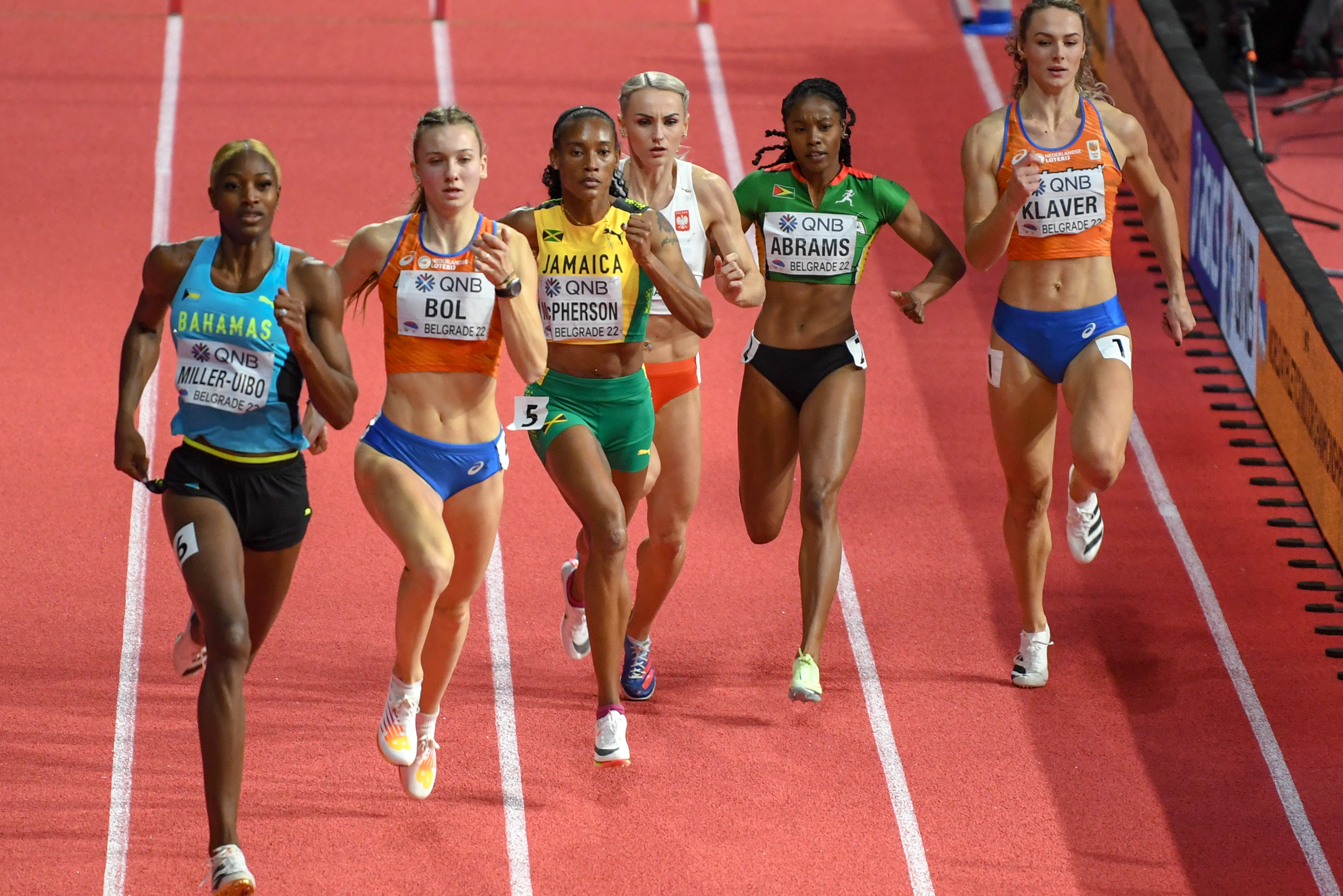
The six finalists between 100 and 200 metres into the race, with medalists Shaunae Miller-Uibo, Femke Bol, and Stephenie Ann McPherson on the left

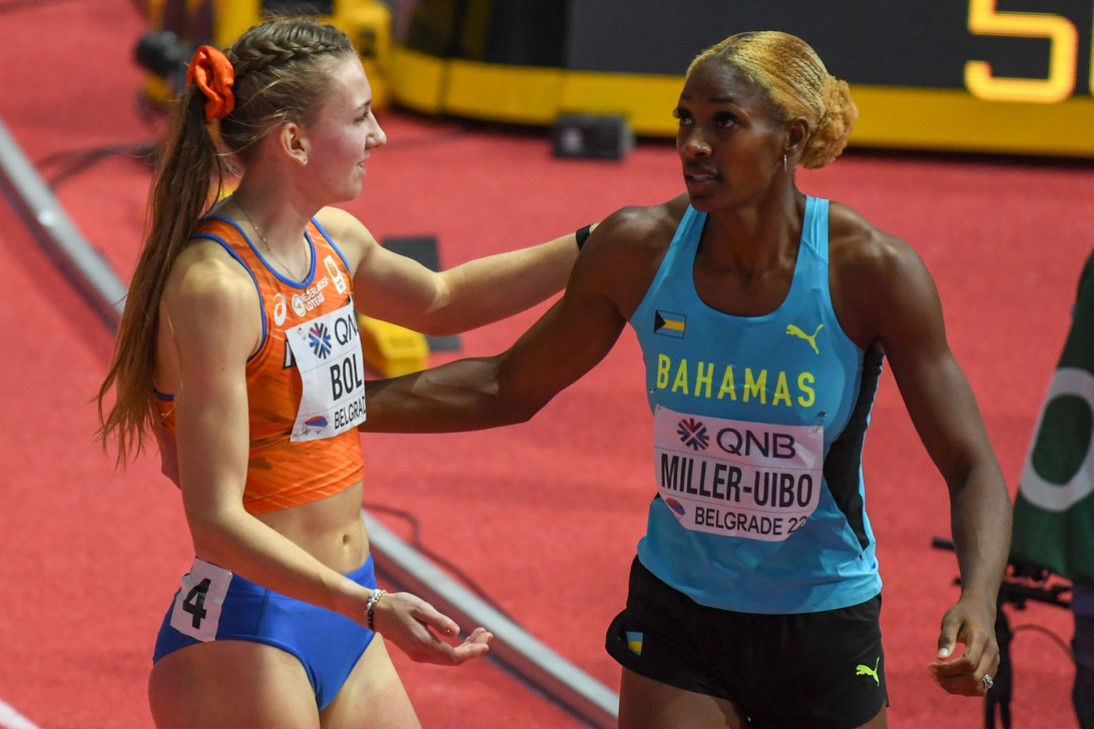
Winner Shaunae Miller-Uibo (right) and runner-up Femke Bol after the final finish

Six athletes from five nations competed in the final on 19 March at 19:55 (UTC+1). Shaunae Miller-Uibo of The Bahamas was ahead of the other runners at 100 metres, and she maintained her leading position the rest of the race. Miller-Uibo won in a season's best time of 50.31 s, followed by Femke Bol of the Netherlands who finished in second place in 50.57 s and Stephenie Ann McPherson of Jamaica in third place in a national record (NR) of 50.79 s.

Results of the final
Rank	Lane	Name	Nation	Time	Notes
1st place, gold medalist(s)	6	Shaunae Miller-Uibo	Bahamas	50.31	SB
2nd place, silver medalist(s)	4	Femke Bol	Netherlands	50.57	
3rd place, bronze medalist(s)	5	Stephenie Ann McPherson	Jamaica	50.79	NR
4	3	Justyna Święty-Ersetic	Poland	51.40	
5	2	Aliyah Abrams	Guyana	52.34	
6	1	Lieke Klaver	Netherlands	52.67	
