= Jenea McCammon =

Guyanese hurdler

Personal information
- Born: 9 June 1991 (age 35)

Sport
- Sport: Track and field
Medal record
Representing Guyana
South American Games
| Bronze medal – third place | 2018 Cochabamba | 100m hurdles |

Jenea Stacia McCammon (born 9 June 1991) is a Guyanese hurdler who competes in both 100 and 400 metres hurdles.

She represents Guyana since 2014. In the 100 metres hurdles she finished fourth at the 2017 South American Championships, won the bronze medal at the 2018 South American Games and finished seventh at the 2018 Central American and Caribbean Games.

In the 400 metres hurdles she finished fifth at the 2017 South American Championships. She also competed at the 2015 Pan American Games without reaching the final.

Her personal best times are 13.27 seconds in the 100 metres hurdles, achieved at the 2018 Central American and Caribbean Games in Barranquilla; and 57.92 seconds in the 400 metres hurdles, achieved in May 2012 in Greensboro. The 100 m hurdles time is a Guyanese record, however her Guyanese 400 m hurdles record is 58.46 seconds from 2016 due to her representing the US when achieving her personal best.
