= Brenessa Thompson =

Guyanese sprinter

Personal information
- Born: 22 July 1996 (age 29)
- Height: 1.63 m (5 ft 4 in)
- Weight: 62 kg (137 lb)

Sport
- Country: Guyana
- Sport: Athletics
- Event(s): 100 metres, 200 metres

Achievements and titles
- Personal bests: 100m: 11.14 s (Leonora, 2016); 200m: 22.99 s (Lawrence (Rock Chalk Park), KS 2016)
- Updated on 16 May 2016

Brenessa Thompson (born 22 July 1996) is a Guyanese sprinter who specializes in 100m and 200m.

Thompson competed for the Texas A&M Aggies track and field team in the NCAA.

She represented Guyana in the 2014 World Junior Championships in Eugene, Oregon, where she made the semi-finals in the 100m. She has a personal best in the 100m of 11.14 and holds the Guyanese record in the 200m with a time of 23.19.
