= Jasmine Abrams =

Guyanese sprinter

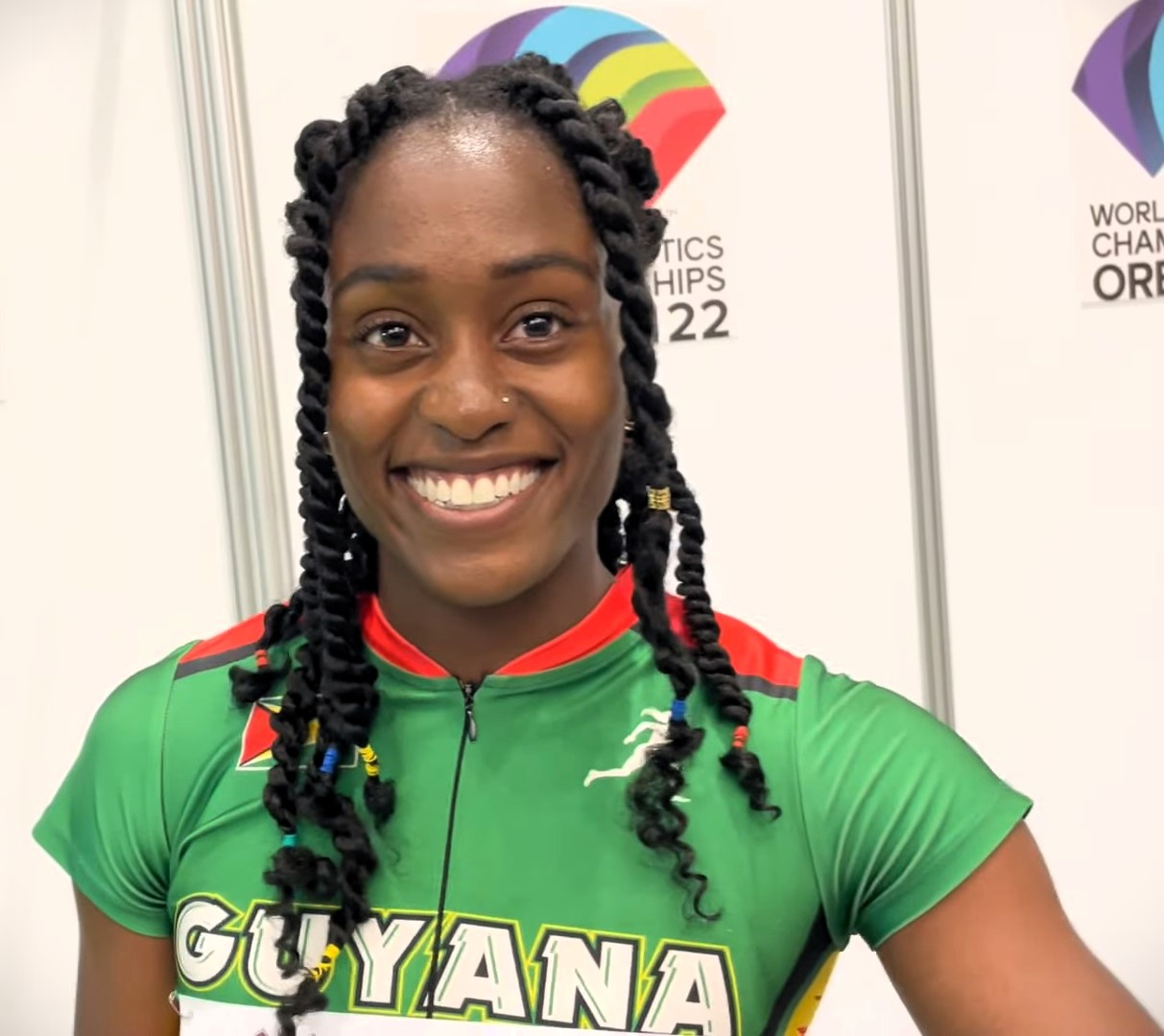
- Abrams in 2022

Personal information
- Nationality: Guyanese
- Born: 14 March 1994 (age 32) New York, New York, U.S.

Sport
- Sport: Athletics
- Event: 100 metres

Achievements and titles
- Personal best: 100 meters: 11.07 (2022, NR)
Medal record
Women's athletics
Representing Guyana
Pan American Games
Silver medal – second place	2023 Santiago	100 m

Jasmine Abrams (born 14 March 1994) is a Guyanese Olympic athlete.

== Career ==
In January 2020, Abrams set a new national indoor record in the 60 metres. In July 2021, she qualified to represent Guyana at the delayed 2020 Summer Olympics in Tokyo. She finished seventh in her heat in the Athletics at the 2020 Summer Olympics – Women's 100 metres running 11.79 seconds.

Abrams retired from professional track and field in 2025. She competed in the 2026 Enhanced Games.

== Personal life ==
Abrams was born in New York City to Guyanese parents. Her sister Aliyah Abrams is also an Olympic athlete.
