= List of flag bearers for Guyana at the Olympics =

Guyana at the Olympics
- IOC code: GUY
- NOC: Guyana Olympic Association
- Medals: Gold 0 Silver 0 Bronze 1 Total 1

Summer appearances
- 1948; 1952; 1956; 1960; 1964; 1968; 1972; 1976; 1980; 1984; 1988; 1992; 1996; 2000; 2004; 2008; 2012; 2016; 2020; 2024

This is a list of flag bearers who have represented Guyana at the Olympics.

Flag bearers carry the national flag of their country at the opening ceremony of the Olympic Games.

#	Event year	Season	Flag bearer	Sport	Ref.
1	1972	Summer	Gordon Sankis	Official	
2	1980	Summer	James Gilkes	Athletics	
3	1984	Summer	Earl Haley	Athletics	
4	1988	Summer	Alfred Thomas	Boxing	
5	1992	Summer	Aubrey Richmond	Cycling	
6	1996	Summer	John Douglas	Boxing	
7	2000	Summer	Aliann Pompey	Athletics	
8	2004	Summer	Aliann Pompey	Athletics	
9	2008	Summer	Niall Roberts	Swimming	
10	2012	Summer	Winston George	Athletics	
11	2016	Summer	Hannibal Gaskin	Swimming	
12	2020	Summer	Chelsea Edghill	Table tennis	
12	2020	Summer	Andrew Fowler	Swimming	
13	2024	Summer	Emanuel Archibald	Athletics	
13	2024	Summer	Chelsea Edghill	Table tennis	

== See also ==
- Guyana at the Olympics
