= Guyana at the 2020 Summer Olympics =

- Flag of Guyana
- IOC code: GUY
- NOC: Guyana Olympic Association
- Website: www.guyolympics.com

in Tokyo, Japan July 23 – August 8, 2021
- Competitors: 7 in 4 sports
- Flag bearers (opening): Chelsea Edghill; Andrew Fowler
- Flag bearer (closing): Emanuel Archibald
- Medals: Gold 0 Silver 0 Bronze 0 Total 0

Summer Olympics appearances (overview)
- 1948; 1952; 1956; 1960; 1964; 1968; 1972; 1976; 1980; 1984; 1988; 1992; 1996; 2000; 2004; 2008; 2012; 2016; 2020; 2024

Guyana competed at the 2020 Summer Olympics in Tokyo, Japan, from 23 July to 8 August 2021. It was the nation's eighteenth appearance at the Summer Olympics including the five appearances (1948 to 1964) as British Guiana. The Guyanese delegation consisted of seven athletes competing in four sports. It did not win any medals at the Games.

== Background ==
The Guyana Olympic Association was created in 1935 and recognized by the International Olympic Committee on 27 July 1948 at the IOC session in London, enabling British Guiana to make its Olympic debut at the 1948 Summer Olympics. It appeared in five editions (1948 to 1964) as British Guiana, and later as Guyana since the 1968 Summer Olympics. It has since participated in every Olympics except the 1976 Summer Olympics in Montreal, where it withdrew in support of the African-led boycott of the Games. The 2020 Summer Olympics was the nation's eighteenth appearance at the Summer Olympics.

The 2020 Summer Olympics were held in Tokyo, Japan, between 23 July and 8 August 2021. Originally scheduled to take place from 24 July to 9 August 2020, the Games were postponed due to the COVID-19 pandemic. For the first time, the International Olympic Committee invited each National Olympic Committee to select one female and one male athlete to jointly carry their flag during the opening ceremony. Table tennis player Chelsea Edghill and swimmer Andrew Fowler served as Guyana's flag-bearers at the opening ceremony. Sprinter Emanuel Archibald carried the flag at the closing ceremony.

The country's sole Olympic medal is a bronze won by boxer Michael Anthony in the bantamweight division at the 1980 Summer Olympics in Moscow. None of the seven athletes won a medal in the 2020 Summer Olympics.

== Competitors ==
The Guyanese delegation consisted of three track and field athletes — Aliyah Abrams, Jasmine Abrams, and Emanuel Archibald — boxer Keevin Allicock, two swimmers — Andrew Fowler and Aleka Persaud — and table tennis player Chelsea Edghill.

Sport	Men	Women	Total
Athletics	1	2	3
Boxing	1	0	1
Swimming	1	1	2
Table tennis	0	1	1
Total	3	4	7

== Athletics ==
As per the governing body World Athletics (WA), a NOC was allowed to enter up to three qualified athletes in each individual event if the Olympic Qualifying Standards (OQS) for the respective events had been met during the qualifying period. The remaining places were allocated based on the World Athletics Rankings which were derived from the average of the best five results for an athlete over the designated qualifying period, weighted by the importance of the meet. Aliyah Abrams qualified for the women's 400 m, becoming the first Guyanese to qualify for the Olympic Games, while Jasmine Abrams earned a berth for the women's 100 m event through her World Athletics ranking. The two sisters became the first siblings to represent Guyana at the same Olympic Games. Emanuel Archibald, received a universality place to compete in the men's 100 m event.

The athletics events were held at the Japan National Stadium in Tokyo. Jasmine Abrams finished seventh in her heat in the women's 100 m event with a time of 11.49 seconds and did not advance to the semifinals. In the men's 100 m, Archibald advanced out of the preliminary round after finishing second in his heat with a time of 10.3 seconds. However, he finished last of nine runners in the quarterfinal, clocking 10.41 seconds, and did not advance to the semifinals. Aliyah Abrams finished fourth in the preliminary heats of the women's 400 m with her season's best time of 51.44 seconds, qualifying for the semifinals. She was the first Guyanese woman since four-time Olympian Aliann Pompey to reach the 400 m semifinal at the Olympics. She finished seventh in the semifinal with a time of 51.46 seconds.

Key

- Note–Ranks given for track events are within the athlete's heat only
- Q = Qualified for the next round
- q = Qualified for the next round as a fastest loser or, in field events, by position without achieving the qualifying target
- NR = National record
- N/A = Round not applicable for the event
- Bye = Athlete not required to compete in round

Track & road events

Athlete	Event	Heat		Quarterfinal		Semifinal		Final	
Athlete	Event	Result	Rank	Result	Rank	Result	Rank	Result	Rank
Emanuel Archibald	Men's 100 m	10.30	2 Q	10.41	9	Did not advance			
Jasmine Abrams	Women's 100 m	Bye		11.49	7	Did not advance			
Aliyah Abrams	Women's 400 m	—N/a		51.44 SB	4 q	51.46	7	Did not advance	

== Boxing ==
The qualification to the Olympic Games was determined by the performance of the boxers at the four continental Olympic qualifying tournaments (Africa, Americas, Asia & Oceania, and Europe) and at the World Olympic qualification tournament. The final list of qualifiers was announced on 15 July 2021. Keevin Allicock qualified for the Games in the men's featherweight category. He became the first Guyanese boxer to compete at the Olympics since John Douglas at the 1996 Summer Olympics in Atlanta.

The boxing events were held at the Ryōgoku Kokugikan. In the round of 32 in the men's featherweight event, Allicock lost by unanimous decision to Alexy de la Cruz of the Dominican Republic, with all five judges scoring the bout in favour of de la Cruz (30-27, 29-28, 29-28, 29-28, 29-27).

Men's boxing

Athlete	Event	Round of 32	Round of 16	Quarterfinals	Semifinals	Final	
Athlete	Event	Opposition Result	Opposition Result	Opposition Result	Opposition Result	Opposition Result	Rank
Keevin Allicock	Men's featherweight	de la Cruz (DOM); L 0–5	Did not advance				

== Swimming ==
As per the Fédération internationale de natation (FINA) guidelines, a NOC was permitted to enter a maximum of two qualified athletes in each individual event, who have achieved the Olympic Qualifying Time (OQT). If the quota was not filled, one athlete per event was allowed to enter per NOC, provided they achieved the Olympic Selection Time (OST) in competitions approved by World Aquatics in the period between 1 March 2019 to 27 June 2021. If the overeall quota was not met, FINA allowed NOCs to enter one swimmer per gender under a universality place even if they have not achieved the standard entry times (OQT/OST). Guyana received a universality invitation from FINA to send two top-ranked swimmers (one per gender) in their respective individual events to the Olympics, based on the FINA points as on 28 June 2021.

The swimming events were held at the Tokyo Aquatics Centre. Andrew Fowler competed in the men's 100 m freestyle event, and finished fourth in first heat with a time of 55.23 seconds and did not advance to the semifinals. Aleka Persaud, who was 15 years old, became the youngest Guyanese athlete ever to compete at the Olympics when she competed in the women's 50 m freestyle. She finished second in fourth heat with a new national record time of 27.76 seconds, though this was not enough for her to advance to the semifinals.

Athlete	Event	Heat		Semifinal		Final	
Athlete	Event	Time	Rank	Time	Rank	Time	Rank
Andrew Fowler	Men's 100 m freestyle	55.23	67	Did not advance			
Aleka Persaud	Women's 50 m freestyle	27.76	55	Did not advance			

== Table tennis ==
According to the International Table Tennis Federation (ITTF), each NOC was allowed to enter up to six athletes, two male and two female athletes in singles events, up to one men's and one women's team in team events, and up to one pair in mixed doubles. Qualification was awarded through a combination of ITTF rankings, continental quotas and world qualification tournaments. Chelsea Edghill received a wild card from ITTF to contest in the Olympics and became the first Guyanese, and the first female from the English-speaking Caribbean, to compete in the sport at the Olympics.

The table tennis events were held at the Tokyo Metropolitan Gymnasium. In the women's singles, Edghill defeated Sally Yee of Fiji 4–1 (11–5, 4–11, 11–3, 11–6, 11–8) in the Round of 64, before losing 0–4 (7–11, 9–11, 1–11, 10–12) to South Korea's Shin Yubin in the Round of 32.

Women's singles

Athlete	Event	Preliminary	Round 1	Round 2	Round 3	Round of 16	Quarterfinals	Semifinals	Final / BM	
Athlete	Event	Opposition Result	Opposition Result	Opposition Result	Opposition Result	Opposition Result	Opposition Result	Opposition Result	Opposition Result	Rank
Chelsea Edghill	Women's singles	Yee (FIJ); W 4–1	Shin Y-b (KOR); L 0–4	Did not advance						

== See also ==
- Guyana at the 2016 Summer Olympics
- Guyana at the 2019 Pan American Games
- Guyana at the 2024 Summer Olympics
