= Guyana at the 2012 Summer Olympics =

- IOC code: GUY
- NOC: Guyana Olympic Association

in London
- Competitors: 6 in 3 sports
- Flag bearers: Winston George (opening); Aliann Pompey (closing)
- Medals: Gold 0 Silver 0 Bronze 0 Total 0

Summer Olympics appearances (overview)
- 1948; 1952; 1956; 1960; 1964; 1968; 1972; 1976; 1980; 1984; 1988; 1992; 1996; 2000; 2004; 2008; 2012; 2016; 2020; 2024

Guyana competed at the 2012 Summer Olympics in London, United Kingdom from 27 July to 12 August 2012. This was the nation's 16th appearance at the Olympics as an independent nation, although it had previously competed in five other games as British Guiana.

The Guyana Olympic Association sent a total of six athletes to the Games, four men and two women, to compete in athletics, judo and swimming.

== Background ==
British Guiana was first represented at the 1948 Summer Olympics in London, England, United Kingdom and made five consecutive appearances before Guyanese independence. As an independent country, Guyana made its Olympic debut at the 1968 Summer Olympics in Mexico City, Mexico and has competed at every Summer Olympics since. The 2012 Summer Olympics in London, England, United Kingdom marked Guyana's 16th appearance at the Summer Olympics. Prior to 2012, Guyana had only won one previous medal – a bronze at the 1980 Summer Olympics in Moscow, Russian Soviet Federative Socialist Republic, Soviet Union.

== Competitors ==
In total, six athletes represented Guyana at the 2012 Summer Olympics in London, England, United Kingdom across three different sports.

Sport	Men	Women	Total
Athletics	2	1	3
Judo	1	0	1
Swimming	1	1	2
Total	4	2	6

== Athletics ==
In total, three Guyanese athletes participated in the athletics events – Jeremy Bascorn in the men's 100 m, Winston George in the men's 400 m and Aliann Pompey in the women's 400 m.

Men

Athlete	Event	Heat		Quarterfinal		Semifinal		Final	
Athlete	Event	Result	Rank	Result	Rank	Result	Rank	Result	Rank
Jeremy Bascorn	100 m	Bye		10.31	6	did not advance			
Winston George	400 m	46.86	5	—		did not advance			

Women

Athlete	Event	Heat		Semifinal		Final	
Athlete	Event	Result	Rank	Result	Rank	Result	Rank
Aliann Pompey	400 m	52.10	4 q	52.58	8	did not advance	

== Judo ==
In total, one Guyanese athlete participated in the judo events – Raul Lall in the men's −60 kg category.

Athlete	Event	Round of 64	Round of 32	Round of 16	Quarterfinals	Semifinals	Repechage	Final / BM	
Athlete	Event	Opposition Result	Opposition Result	Opposition Result	Opposition Result	Opposition Result	Opposition Result	Opposition Result	Rank
Raul Lall	Men's −60 kg	Bye	Majrashi (KSA); L 0000–0100	did not advance					

== Swimming ==
In total, two Guyanese athletes participated in the swimming events – Brittany van Lange in the women's 100 m freestyle and Niall Roberts in the men's 100 m freestyle.

Men

Athlete	Event	Heat		Semifinal		Final	
Athlete	Event	Time	Rank	Time	Rank	Time	Rank
Niall Roberts	100 m freestyle	55.66	48	did not advance			

Women

Athlete	Event	Heat		Semifinal		Final	
Athlete	Event	Time	Rank	Time	Rank	Time	Rank
Brittany van Lange	100 m freestyle	1:01.62	42	did not advance			

== See also ==
- Guyana at the 2011 Pan American Games
