= Guyana at the 2024 Summer Olympics =

- IOC code: GUY
- NOC: Guyana Olympic Association

in Paris, France 26 July 2024 – 11 August 2024
- Competitors: 5 (2 men and 3 women) in 3 sports
- Flag bearers (opening): Emanuel Archibald & Chelsea Edghill
- Flag bearers (closing): Emanuel Archibald & Aliyah Abrams
- Medals: Gold 0 Silver 0 Bronze 0 Total 0

Summer Olympics appearances (overview)
- 1948; 1952; 1956; 1960; 1964; 1968; 1972; 1976; 1980; 1984; 1988; 1992; 1996; 2000; 2004; 2008; 2012; 2016; 2020; 2024

Guyana competed at the 2024 Summer Olympics. Since the nation debuted in 1948, Guyanese athletes have participated in every edition of the Summer Olympic Games except the 1976 Summer Olympics as part of the African-led boycott.

== Competitors ==
The following is the list of number of competitors in the Games.

Sport	Men	Women	Total
Athletics	1	1	2
Swimming	1	1	2
Table tennis	0	1	1
Total	2	3	5

== Events ==
=== Athletics ===
Guyanese track and field athletes achieved the entry standards for Paris 2024 by world ranking, in the following events (a maximum of 3 athletes each):

Track and road events
Athlete	Event	Preliminary		Heat		Repechage		Semifinal		Final	
Athlete	Event	Result	Rank	Result	Rank	Result	Rank	Result	Rank	Result	Rank
Emanuel Archibald	Men's 100 m	Bye		10.40	8	—		Did not advance			
Aliyah Abrams	Women's 400 m	—		51.55 SB	4 R	51.84	5	Did not advance			

=== Swimming ===
Guyana sent two swimmers to compete.

Athlete	Event	Heat		Semifinal		Final	
Athlete	Event	Time	Rank	Time	Rank	Time	Rank
Raekwon Noel	Men's 400 m freestyle	4:02.29 NR	34	Did not advance			
Aleka Persaud	Women's 100 m freestyle	1:01.29	28	Did not advance			

=== Table tennis ===
Guyanese table tennis players qualified one participant in the women's singles for the Games, through a universality place.

Athlete	Event	Preliminary	Round of 64	Round of 32	Round of 16	Quarterfinals	Semifinals	Final / BM	
Athlete	Event	Opposition Result	Opposition Result	Opposition Result	Opposition Result	Opposition Result	Opposition Result	Opposition Result	Rank
Chelsea Edghill	Women's singles	Hanffou (CMR); L 1–4	Did not advance						

Key

- Note–Ranks given for track events are within the athlete's heat only
- Q = Qualified for the next round
- q = Qualified for the next round as the fastest loser or, in field events, by position without achieving the qualifying target
- NR = National record
- N/A = Round not applicable for the event
- Bye = Athlete not required to compete in round

== See also ==
- Guyana at the 2023 Pan American Games
