= Guyana at the 1984 Summer Olympics =

- IOC code: GUY
- NOC: Guyana Olympic Association

in Los Angeles
- Competitors: 10 (8 men, 2 women)
- Flag bearer: Earl Haley
- Medals: Gold 0 Silver 0 Bronze 0 Total 0

Summer Olympics appearances (overview)
- 1948; 1952; 1956; 1960; 1964; 1968; 1972; 1976; 1980; 1984; 1988; 1992; 1996; 2000; 2004; 2008; 2012; 2016; 2020; 2024

Guyana competed at the 1984 Summer Olympics in Los Angeles, United States. Ten competitors, eight men and two women, took part in twelve events in three sports.

== Athletics ==
Women's Long Jump

- Jennifer Inniss

- Qualification – 6.17 m (→ did not advance, 13th place)

== Cycling ==
Three cyclists represented Guyana in 1984.

Individual road race

- Randolph Toussaint – did not finish (→ no ranking)

Sprint

- James Joseph

Points race

- Aubrey Richmond
