= Guyana at the 1980 Summer Olympics =

- IOC code: GUY
- NOC: Guyana Olympic Association

in Moscow
- Competitors: 8 (7 men, 1 women) in 3 sports
- Flag bearer: James Gilkes
- Medals Ranked 35th: Gold 0 Silver 0 Bronze 1 Total 1

Summer Olympics appearances (overview)
- 1948; 1952; 1956; 1960; 1964; 1968; 1972; 1976; 1980; 1984; 1988; 1992; 1996; 2000; 2004; 2008; 2012; 2016; 2020; 2024

Guyana competed at the 1980 Summer Olympics in Moscow, USSR. They returned to the Olympic Games after missing the event in 1976. They debuted in 1948, and this was their eighth appearance. They won their first, and only Olympic medal to date during these games. Eight competitors, seven men and one woman, took part in ten events in three sports.

== Medalists ==
Medal	Name	Sport	Event	Date
Bronze	Michael Anthony	Boxing	Bantamweight	July 31

== Athletics ==
Men's 100 metres

- James Gilkes

- Heat — 10.34
- Quarterfinals — 10.26
- Semifinals — 10.44 (→ did not advance)

Women's 100 metres

- Jennifer Inniss

- Heat — 11.79 (→ did not advance)

Women's Long Jump

- Jennifer Inniss

- Qualification — 6.44 m
- Final — 6.10 m (→ 13th place)

== Boxing ==
Men's Bantamweight (54 kg)

- Michael Anthony → Bronze Medal
  1. First Round — Bye
  2. Second Round — Defeated Nureni Gbadamosi (Nigeria) on points (5-0)
  3. Third Round — Defeated Fayez Zaghloul (Syria) on points (3-2)
  4. Quarter Finals — Defeated Daniel Zaragoza (Mexico) after referee stopped contest in second round
  5. Semi Finals — Lost to Juan Hernández (Cuba) on points (0-5)

Men's Featherweight (57 kg)

- Fitzroy Brown
  1. First Round — Bye
  2. Second Round — Defeated Abilio Almeida Cabral (Angola) on points (5-0)
  3. Third Round — Lost to Luis Pizarro (Puerto Rico) on points (0-5)

Men's Light-Welterweight (63,5 kg)

- Barrington Cambridge
  1. First Round — Lost to Boualem Bel Alouane (Algeria) on points (0-5)

Men's Middleweight (71 kg)

- Alfred Thomas
  1. First Round — Lost to Valentin Silaghi (Romania) on points (0-5)

== Cycling ==
Two cyclists represented Guyana in 1980.

Sprint

- James Joseph

1000m time trial

- Errol McLean
