= Guyana at the 2017 World Championships in Athletics =

- Flag of Guyana
- WA code: GUY
- National federation: Athletics Association of Guyana
- Website: aaguyana.com

in London, United Kingdom 4–13 August 2017
- Competitors: 2 (1 man and 1 woman) in 3 events
- Medals: Gold 0 Silver 0 Bronze 0 Total 0

World Championships in Athletics appearances
- 1983; 1987; 1991; 1993; 1995; 1997; 1999; 2001; 2003; 2005; 2007; 2009; 2011; 2013; 2015; 2017; 2019; 2022; 2023; 2025

Guyana competed at the 2017 World Championships in Athletics in London, United Kingdom, from 4–13 August 2017.

== Results ==
=== Men ===
Track and road events

| Athlete | Event | Heat | | Semifinal | | Final | |
| Athlete | Event | Result | Rank | Result | Rank | Result | Rank |
|---|---|---|---|---|---|---|---|
| Winston George | 200 metres | 20.61 | 28 Q | 20.74 | 22 | Did not advance | |
| Winston George | 400 metres | 46.02 | 35 | Did not advance | | | |

Field events

| Athlete | Event | Qualification | | Final | |
| Athlete | Event | Distance | Position | Distance | Position |
|---|---|---|---|---|---|
| Troy Doris | Triple jump | 16.42 | 22 | Did not advance | |
