= British Guiana at the 1948 Summer Olympics =

- Flag of British Guiana
- IOC code: BGU
- NOC: National Olympic Committee of British Guiana

in London
- Competitors: 4 in 3 sports
- Medals: Gold 0 Silver 0 Bronze 0 Total 0

Summer Olympics appearances (overview)
- 1948; 1952; 1956; 1960; 1964; 1968; 1972; 1976; 1980; 1984; 1988; 1992; 1996; 2000; 2004; 2008; 2012; 2016; 2020; 2024; 2028

British Guiana (now Guyana) competed at the 1948 Summer Olympics in London, England. Four competitors, all men, took part in seven events in three sports. It was the first time that the nation competed at the Olympic Games.

== Athletics ==
Key

- Note–Ranks given for track events are within the athlete's heat only
- Q = Qualified for the next round
- q = Qualified for the next round as a fastest loser

Men
Track & road events

Athlete	Event	Heat		Quarterfinal		Semifinal		Final	
Athlete	Event	Result	Rank	Result	Rank	Result	Rank	Result	Rank
Charles Thompson	100 m	Unknown	5	Did not advance					

Field events

Athlete	Event	Qualification		Final	
Athlete	Event	Result	Rank	Result	Rank
Charles Thompson	Long jump	6.580	19	Did not advance	
Charles Thompson	Triple jump	DNS		Did not advance	

== Cycling ==
One cyclist represented British Guiana in 1948.

Individual road race

- Laddie Lewis

Sprint

- Laddie Lewis

Time trial

- Laddie Lewis
