= Guyana at the 2008 Summer Olympics =

- IOC code: GUY
- NOC: Guyana Olympic Association

in Beijing
- Competitors: 4 in 2 sports
- Flag bearer: Niall Roberts
- Medals: Gold 0 Silver 0 Bronze 0 Total 0

Summer Olympics appearances (overview)
- 1948; 1952; 1956; 1960; 1964; 1968; 1972; 1976; 1980; 1984; 1988; 1992; 1996; 2000; 2004; 2008; 2012; 2016; 2020; 2024; 2028

Guyana sent a team to compete at the 2008 Summer Olympics in Beijing, China. Four representatives of Guyana qualified to take part in the Beijing Games–Adam Harris, Marian Burnett, and Aliann Pompey in track, and Niall Roberts in swimming–and Pompey advanced past the first round in her event, progressing to semifinals. Meanwhile, Alika Morgan (track & field) and Geron Williams (cycling) took part in the Games' Youth Olympics camp, held in Beijing at the same time as the Olympics. Along with coaches and administrative members, Guyana sent a total of ten people to Beijing. The appearance of Guyana's delegation in Beijing marked the fifteenth Guyanese Olympic delegation to appear at an Olympic games, which started with their participation as British Guiana in the 1948 Summer Olympics. There were no medalists from Guyana at the Beijing Olympics. Roberts was Guyana's flagbearer at the ceremonies in Beijing.

== Background ==
Guyana is a former British colony that extends from the northern coast of South America. It is adjacent to Venezuela, Brazil, and Suriname, and is within the vicinity of the island nation of Trinidad and Tobago. Athletes from Guyanese delegations have appeared at the Olympics since the 1948 Summer Olympics in London, and have participated at every Summer Olympic games between 1948 and 2008 except for the 1976 Summer Olympics in Montréal. Guyana declared independence from the British Empire in 1966, and participated in all previous games (from 1948 to 1964) under its colonial name, British Guiana. Overall, Guyana's appearance in Beijing marked its fifteenth Olympic appearance. The country has not sent delegations to participate in any Winter Games.

In all of its history, the only case in which a Guyanese athlete has medaled at the Olympics was when Michael Anthony won a bronze medal at the 1980 Summer Olympics in the Soviet Union. The size of Guyana's delegation peaked at the 1984 Summer Olympics in Los Angeles when it sent ten athletes, but (as of Beijing) had never risen past seven athletes other than in the 1980s. In Beijing, swimmer Niall Roberts bore Guyana's flag at the ceremonies.

A total of ten people constituted the Guyanese delegation to Beijing: the four Olympic athletes, two Youth Olympic athletes (sprinter Alika Morgan and cyclist Geron Williams), chef-de-mission Noel Adonis, swimming coach Stephanie Fraser, track and field team manager Cornel Rose, and track and field coach Joseph Ryan. Six of the delegation's members were based in Guyana and departed from their nation on 2 August 2008 for Beijing.

== Athletics ==
=== Men's competition ===
==== Men's 200 meters ====
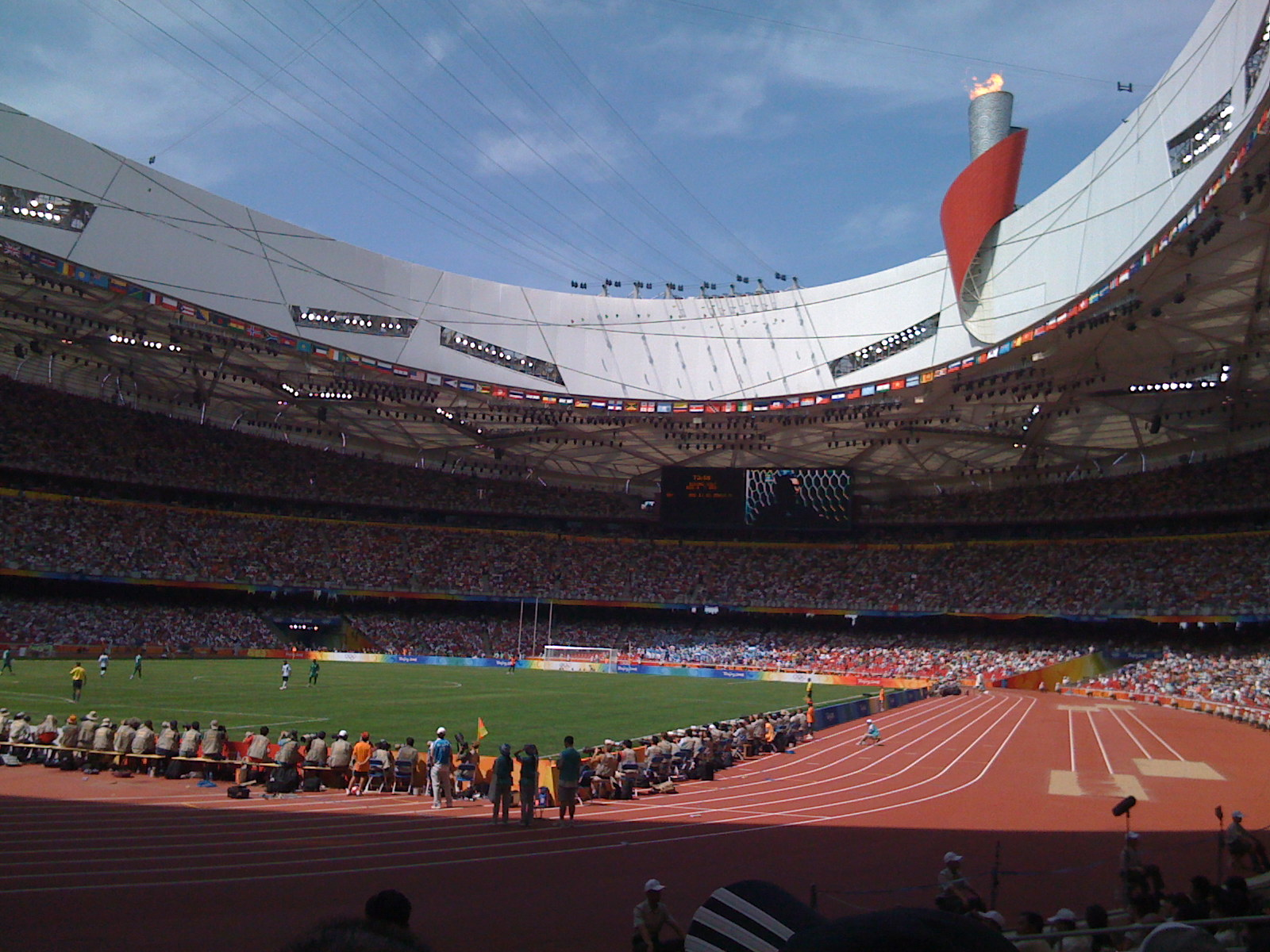
The Beijing National Stadium, where Harris, Burnett, and Pompey competed in their events

Adam Harris, who was 21 at the time of the Beijing Olympics, was the sole male track athlete participating on Guyana's behalf in 2008. Born in the Chicago area, Harris previously participated as an athlete at the University of Michigan. In Beijing, Adam Harris participated in the men's 200 meters dash, marking the first time he ever participated in any Olympic event. Harris participated in the first heat during the 17 August qualification round of his event, and finished the race in sixth place at 21.36 seconds. Harris placed ahead of Jordan's Khalil Al Hanahneh (21.55 seconds) and behind Botswana's Fanuel Kenosi (21.09 seconds). The leaders of Harris' heat included the United States' Shawn Crawford (20.61 seconds) and Poland's Marcin Jedrusinski (20.64 seconds). Out of the 62 finishing athletes, Harris ranked 50th. He did not advance to later rounds.

Athlete	Event	Heat		Quarterfinal		Semifinal		Final	
Athlete	Event	Result	Rank	Result	Rank	Result	Rank	Result	Rank
Adam Harris	200 m	21.36	6	Did not advance					

=== Women's competition ===
==== Women's 800 meters ====
Marian Burnett participated on Guyana's behalf in the women's 800 meters race at the Beijing Olympics. Born in Linden, Burnett has been affiliated with the athletics program at Louisiana State University in Baton Rouge. His appearance at Beijing marked her second after her appearance in the same event at the 2004 Summer Olympics in Athens, where she also represented Guyana. During the 14 August qualification round, Burnett was placed in the second heat. She completed the race in 2:02.02, placing fifth in a heat of seven people. Burnett placed ahead of the United States' Alice Schmidt (2:02.33) and behind Belarus' Sviatlana Usovich (2:00.42) in a heat led by the Ukraine's Yuliya Krevsun (2:00.21) and Russia's Tatiana Andrianova (2:00.31). Out of the 40 finishing athletes, Burnett placed 23rd. She did not advance to later rounds.

==== Women's 400 meters ====
Manhattan College-affiliated athlete Aliann Pompey, (or Allann Pompey) a runner who was born in the capital city of Georgetown and has trained with the Shore Aquatics Club in New Jersey, represented Guyana at the Beijing Olympics in the women's 400 meters race. Pompey had run this race for Guyana both in Athens and during the 2000 Summer Olympics in Sydney and had advanced past the first round each time. During the 16 August qualification round, Pompey competed in the fifth heat and finished the race in 50.99 seconds, placing second behind the United States' Sanya Richards (50.43 seconds) and ahead of Nigeria's Folashade Abugan (51.45 seconds). Out of the 50 participating athletes, Pompey ranked sixth. She advanced to the semifinal round.

At semifinals, which took place on 17 August, Pompey was placed in the first heat. She finished the race in 50.93 seconds and placed fourth out of the eight athletes in the heat, ahead of the United States' Mary Wineberg (51.13 seconds) but behind Russia's Tatiana Firova (50.31 seconds). The leaders of Pompey's semifinal heat were Great Britain's Christine Ohuruogu (50.14 seconds) and Jamaica's Shericka Williams (50.28 seconds). Out of the 24 athletes who advanced to the semifinal round, Pompey ranked 11th. She did not advance to the final round.

Key

- Note–Ranks given for track events are within the athlete's heat only
- Q = Qualified for the next round
- q = Qualified for the next round as a fastest loser or, in field events, by position without achieving the qualifying target
- NR = National record
- N/A = Round not applicable for the event
- Bye = Athlete not required to compete in round

Athlete	Event	Heat		Semifinal		Final	
Athlete	Event	Result	Rank	Result	Rank	Result	Rank
Aliann Pompey	400 m	50.99	2 Q	50.93 NR	4	Did not advance	
Marian Burnett	800 m	2:02.02	5	Did not advance			

== Swimming ==
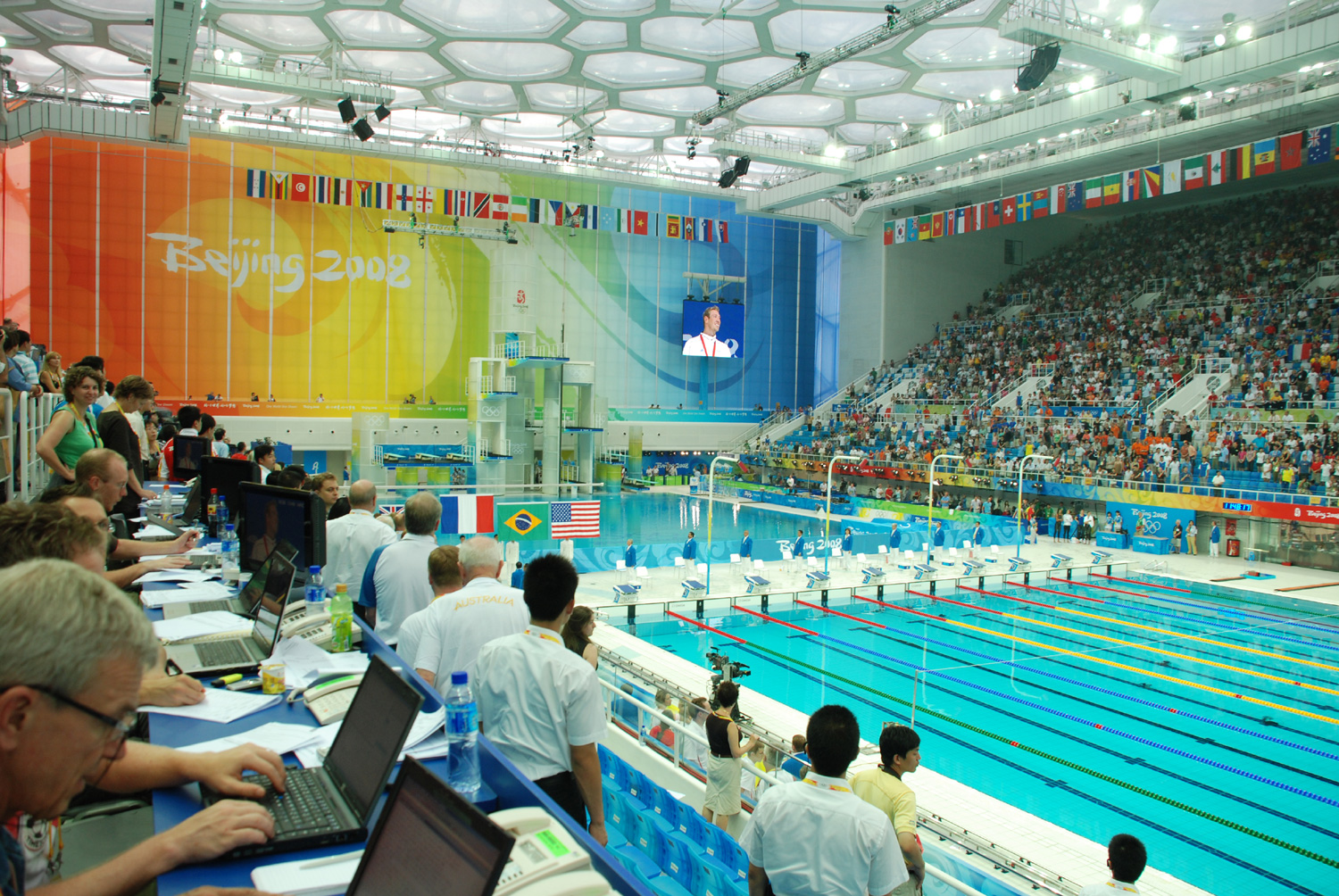
The Beijing National Aquatics Center, where Roberts competed in his event

Then 17-year-old Niall Roberts, who was born in the capital city of Georgetown, participated as the only swimmer representing Guyana in the Beijing Olympics. Roberts participated in the men's 50 meter freestyle, and had not previously participated in any Olympic games. During the 14 August preliminary round, Roberts swam in the sixth heat of his event and completed his race in 25.13 seconds. Roberts placed seventh, placing ahead of Mohamed Attoumane of the Comoros (29.63 seconds) and behind Mozambique's Chakyl Camal (24.93 seconds). The leaders of Roberts' heat were Nigeria's Yellow Yei Yah (24.00 seconds) and the Netherlands Antilles' Rodion Davelaar (24.21 seconds). Out of the 97 athletes who participated in the preliminary round, Roberts ranked 69th. He did not advance to later rounds.

Men

Athlete	Event	Heat		Semifinal		Final	
Athlete	Event	Time	Rank	Time	Rank	Time	Rank
Niall Roberts	50 m freestyle	25.13	69	Did not advance			

== See also ==
- Guyana at the 2007 Pan American Games
- Guyana at the 2010 Central American and Caribbean Games
