= British Guiana at the 1952 Summer Olympics =

- Flag of British Guiana
- IOC code: BGU
- NOC: National Olympic Committee of British Guiana

in Helsinki
- Flag bearer: N/A
- Medals: Gold 0 Silver 0 Bronze 0 Total 0

Summer Olympics appearances (overview)
- 1948; 1952; 1956; 1960; 1964; 1968; 1972; 1976; 1980; 1984; 1988; 1992; 1996; 2000; 2004; 2008; 2012; 2016; 2020; 2024

British Guiana competed at the 1952 Summer Olympics in Helsinki, Finland held from 19 July to 3 August 1952. It was the nation's second consecutive appearance at the Summer Olympics, after its debut at the 1948 Summer Olympics. The Guyanese delegation consisted of a single athlete, weightlifter Cecil Moore, who did not win any medals.

== Background ==
The Guyana Olympic Association was established in 1935 and recognized by the International Olympic Committee on 27 July 1948 at the IOC session in London, enabling British Guiana to make its Olympic debut at the 1948 Summer Olympics. The 1952 Summer Olympics was the nation's second consecutive appearance at the Summer Olympics as British Guiana.

The 1952 Summer Olympics was held in Helsinki, Finland from 19 July to 3 August 1952. The Guyanese delegation consisted of a single athlete, weightlifter Cecil Moore, who did not win any medals.

== Competitors ==
The Guyanese delegation consisted of a single athlete.

Sport	Men	Women	Total
Weightlifting	1	0	1
Total	1	0	1

== Weightlifting ==
Cecil Moore represented British Guiana in the men's 82.5 kg (light heavyweight) category. He was born in Bartica in 1929.

The event was held on 27 July 1952 at Messuhalli in Helsinki. There were 23 competitors representing 18 nations. The event consists of three categories–military press, snatch, and clean & jerk with the best of three lifts in each category counted for the final total.

In the military press, Moore cleared 95 kg and 100 kg in his first two attempts respectively, while failing to lift 102.5 kg in his third and final attempt, to be placed equal eighteenth. In the snatch event that followed, he lifted 107.5 kg to finish equal fourteenth. He cleared 97.5 kg in his first attempt, 102.5 in his second attempt, and 107.5 kg in his final attempt. In the clean & jerk, he lifted 135 to be placed eighteenth on the classification table. He lifted 127.5 kg in his first attempt and 135 kg in his second attempt. In the third and final attempt, he tried to lift 142.5 kg, but failed to clear it. He lifted 342.5 kg in total to finish seventeenth overall.

Athlete	Event	Weight				Rank
Athlete	Event	Military Press	Snatch	Clean and jerk	Total	Rank
Cecil Moore	Men's 82.5 kg	100	107.5	135	342.5	17
