= Guyana at the 2016 Summer Olympics =

- IOC code: GUY
- NOC: Guyana Olympic Association

in Rio de Janeiro
- Competitors: 6 in 2 sports
- Flag bearer: Hannibal Gaskin
- Medals: Gold 0 Silver 0 Bronze 0 Total 0

Summer Olympics appearances (overview)
- 1948; 1952; 1956; 1960; 1964; 1968; 1972; 1976; 1980; 1984; 1988; 1992; 1996; 2000; 2004; 2008; 2012; 2016; 2020; 2024

Guyana competed at the 2016 Summer Olympics in Rio de Janeiro, Brazil, from 5 to 21 August 2016. This was the nation's seventeenth appearance at the Summer Olympics as an independent state, although it had previously represented in five other editions (1948 to 1964) under the name British Guiana. Guyana joined the African-led boycott of the 1976 Summer Olympics in Montreal.

Guyana Olympic Association sent a team of six athletes, three per gender, to compete only in track and field and swimming at the Games, matching its roster size (one sport less) with London 2012. Track sprinter Winston George was the only Guyanese athlete to have represented at the previous Games, with the rest of the field making their Olympic debut in Rio de Janeiro. Other notable athletes also featured world-ranked triple jumper Troy Doris and 19-year-old butterfly swimmer Hannibal Gaskin, who eventually led the team by carrying the Guyanese flag at the opening ceremony.

Guyana, however, failed to win its first Olympic medal, since the 1980 Summer Olympics in Moscow, where Michael Anthony took the bronze in men's bantamweight boxing. Unable to end his nation's 36-year drought on the podium, Doris produced a best result for Guyana at these Games, finishing seventh in the men's triple jump final.

== Athletics (track and field) ==
Guyanese athletes have so far achieved qualifying standards in the following athletics events (up to a maximum of 3 athletes in each event):

Key

- Note–Ranks given for track events are within the athlete's heat only
- Q = Qualified for the next round
- q = Qualified for the next round as a fastest loser or, in field events, by position without achieving the qualifying target
- NR = National record
- N/A = Round not applicable for the event
- Bye = Athlete not required to compete in round

Track & road events

Athlete	Event	Heat		Quarterfinal		Semifinal		Final	
Athlete	Event	Result	Rank	Result	Rank	Result	Rank	Result	Rank
Winston George	Men's 400 m	45.77	5	—N/a		Did not advance			
Brenessa Thompson	Women's 100 m	Bye		11.72	7	Did not advance			
Brenessa Thompson	Women's 200 m	23.65	7	—N/a		Did not advance			
Aliyah Abrams	Women's 400 m	52.79	5	—N/a		Did not advance			

Field events

Athlete	Event	Qualification		Final	
Athlete	Event	Distance	Position	Distance	Position
Troy Doris	Men's triple jump	16.81	4 q	16.90	7

== Swimming ==
Guyana has received a Universality invitation from FINA to send two swimmers (one male and one female) to the Olympics.

Athlete	Event	Heat		Semifinal		Final	
Athlete	Event	Time	Rank	Time	Rank	Time	Rank
Hannibal Gaskin	Men's 100 m butterfly	58.57	42	Did not advance			
Jamila Sanmoogan	Women's 50 m freestyle	28.88	63	Did not advance			

== See also ==
- Guyana at the 2015 Pan American Games
