= Guyana at the 1988 Summer Olympics =

- IOC code: GUY
- NOC: Guyana Olympic Association

in Seoul
- Competitors: 8 (7 men, 1 woman) in 3 sports
- Flag bearer: Alfred Thomas
- Medals: Gold 0 Silver 0 Bronze 0 Total 0

Summer Olympics appearances (overview)
- 1948; 1952; 1956; 1960; 1964; 1968; 1972; 1976; 1980; 1984; 1988; 1992; 1996; 2000; 2004; 2008; 2012; 2016; 2020; 2024

Guyana competed at the 1988 Summer Olympics in Seoul, South Korea. A total of eight athletes, seven men and one woman, competed for the nation in three sports.

== Competitors ==
The following is the list of number of competitors in the Games.

Sport	Men	Women	Total
Athletics	2	1	3
Boxing	3	–	3
Cycling	2	0	2
Total	7	1	8

== Athletics ==
Men
Track and road events

Athlete	Event	Heat Round 1		Heat Round 2		Semifinal		Final	
Athlete	Event	Time	Rank	Time	Rank	Time	Rank	Time	Rank
Oslen Barr	800 metres	1:55.95	62	Did not advance					
Curt Hampstead	110 metres hurdles	14.88	36	Did not advance					

Women
Track and road events

Athlete	Event	Heat Round 1		Heat Round 2		Semifinal		Final	
Athlete	Event	Time	Rank	Time	Rank	Time	Rank	Time	Rank
Marilyn Dewarder	400 metres	54.76	34	Did not advance					

== Boxing ==
Athlete	Event	Round of 64	Round of 32	Round of 16	Quarterfinals	Semifinals	Final	
Athlete	Event	Opposition Result	Opposition Result	Opposition Result	Opposition Result	Opposition Result	Opposition Result	Rank
Colin Moore	Light flyweight	Bye	Isaszegi (HUN); L 0–5	Did not advance				
Adrian Carew	Light welterweight	El-Masri (LBN); W 5–0	Dobrašinović (YUG); W 4–1	Gies (FRG); L 2–3	Did not advance			
George Allison	Light middleweight	Bye	Rivera (PUR); L 0–5	Did not advance				

== Cycling ==
Two male cyclists represented Guyana in 1988.

=== Road ===
Men

Athlete	Event	Time	Rank
Byron James	Road race	DNF	

=== Track ===
Sprint

Athlete	Event	Qualification		Round 1	Repechage 1	Round 2	Repechage 2	Quarterfinals	Semifinals	Final	
Athlete	Event	Time Speed (km/h)	Rank	Opposition Time Speed (km/h)	Opposition Time Speed (km/h)	Opposition Time Speed (km/h)	Opposition Time Speed (km/h)	Opposition Time Speed (km/h)	Opposition Time Speed (km/h)	Opposition Time Speed (km/h)	Rank
Colin Abrams	Men's sprint	11.815	21	Faccini (ITA), Carpenter (USA); L	Weber (FRG), Pons (ECU), Becerra (BOL); L	Did not advance					
