= Guyana at the 2023 World Athletics Championships =

- Flag of Guyana
- WA code: GUY

in Budapest, Hungary 19 August 2023 – 27 August 2023
- Competitors: 2 (1 man and 1 woman)
- Medals: Gold 0 Silver 0 Bronze 0 Total 0

World Athletics Championships appearances
- 1983; 1987; 1991; 1993; 1995; 1997; 1999; 2001; 2003; 2005; 2007; 2009; 2011; 2013; 2015; 2017; 2019; 2022; 2023; 2025

Guyana competed at the 2023 World Athletics Championships in Budapest, Hungary, which were held from 19 to 27 August 2023. The athlete delegation of the country was composed of two competitors, sprinter Emanuel Archibald and Aliyah Abrams. Archibald competed in the men's 100 metres while Abrams competed in the women's 400 metres. Abrams failed to go past the heats though Archibald made it up until the semifinals.

== Background ==
The 2023 World Athletics Championships in Budapest, Hungary, were held from 19 to 27 August 2023. The Championships were held at the National Athletics Centre. To qualify for the World Championships, athletes had to reach an entry standard (e.g. time or distance), place in a specific position at select competitions, be a wild card entry, or qualify through their World Athletics Ranking at the end of the qualification period.

Guyana had two athletes for the Championships, sprinters Emanuel Archibald and Aliyah Abrams. Abrams qualified for the Championships after meeting the entry standard of 51 seconds in the women's 400 metres, running 50.77 seconds to set a new national record at the Tom Jones Invitational.

== Results ==
Key

- Q = Qualified for the next round
- q = Qualified for the next round as a fastest loser or, in field events, by position without achieving the qualifying target
- NR = National record
- PB = Personal best
- SB = Season best
- N/A = Round not applicable for the event

=== Men ===
Archibald first competed in the preliminary rounds of the men's 100 metres on 19 August. He raced in the first heat against six other athletes. There, he recorded a time of 10.27 seconds, placing first, and advanced further into the first round (heats). For the heats held the same day, he raced in the seventh heat against seven other athletes. He placed third with a time of 10.20 seconds and qualified for the semifinals. The semifinals were then held the next day, where Archibald raced in the second heat against seven other athletes. He set a new personal best time of 10.13 seconds but only placed sixth, failing to advance.

Track and road events

Athlete	Event	Preliminary		Heat		Semifinal		Final	
Athlete	Event	Result	Rank	Result	Rank	Result	Rank	Result	Rank
Emanuel Archibald	100 metres	10.27	1 Q	10.20	3 Q	10.13 PB	6	Did not advance	

=== Women ===
Abrams competed in the heats of the women's 400 metres on 20 August in the fifth heat against seven other athletes. There, she recorded a time of 51.44 seconds and placed fifth, failing to advance.

Track and road events

Athlete	Event	Heat		Semifinal		Final	
Athlete	Event	Result	Rank	Result	Rank	Result	Rank
Aliyah Abrams	400 metres	51.44	5	Did not advance			
