= Guyana at the 2004 Summer Olympics =

- IOC code: GUY
- NOC: Guyana Olympic Association

in Athens
- Competitors: 4 in 3 sports
- Flag bearer: Aliann Pompey
- Medals: Gold 0 Silver 0 Bronze 0 Total 0

Summer Olympics appearances (overview)
- 1948; 1952; 1956; 1960; 1964; 1968; 1972; 1976; 1980; 1984; 1988; 1992; 1996; 2000; 2004; 2008; 2012; 2016; 2020; 2024

Guyana competed at the 2004 Summer Olympics in Athens, Greece, from 13 to 29 August 2004. It was the nation's fourteenth appearance at the Summer Olympics including the five appearances (1948 to 1964) as British Guiana. The Guyanese delegation consisted of four athletes competing in three sports. Guyana did not win any medals at the Games.

== Background ==
The Guyana Olympic Association was established in 1935 and recognized by the International Olympic Committee on 27 July 1948 at the IOC session in London, enabling British Guiana to make its Olympic debut at the 1948 Summer Olympics. It appeared in five editions (1948 to 1964) as British Guiana, and later as Guyana since the 1968 Summer Olympics. It has since participated in every Olympics except the 1976 Summer Olympics in Montreal, where it withdrew in support of the African-led boycott of the Games. The 2004 Summer Olympics was the nation's fourteenth appearance at the Summer Olympics.

The 2004 Summer Olympics were held in Athens, Greece between 13 and 29 August 2004. Aliann Pompey served as Guyana's flag-bearer at the opening ceremony. The country did not win a medal in the 2004 Summer Olympics.

== Competitors ==
The Guyanese delegation consisted of three athletes competing in two sports.

Sport	Men	Women	Total
Athletics	0	2	2
Swimming	1	0	1
Weightlifting	1	0	1
Total	2	2	4

== Athletics ==
As per IAAF, a National Olympic Committee (NOC) was allowed to enter up to four qualified athletes in each individual event (maximum of three athletes in each event at the 'A' Standard, and one athlete at the 'B' Standard) if the Olympic Qualifying Standard time was met during the qualifying period. Two Surinamese athletes achieved qualifying standards in the athletics events. Guyana qualified two athletes for the Games, Marian Burnett competed in the women's 800 m and Aliann Pompey in the women's 400 m event.

This was the second Olympic appearance for Pompey, while Burnett made her Olympic debut. Pompey, who was born in Guyana, moved to the United States at the age of 14. She studied at the Manhattan College, and won the 2000 NCAA Division I Outdoor Track and Field Championships in the women's 400 metres. She won a gold and silver in the 2002 Commonwealth Games, and a bronze medal in the 2003 Pan American Games. Burnett had earlier won a silver medal in the 2003 Pan American Games in the 800 meters event.

In the women's 400 metres preliminary rounds held on 21 August, Pompey finished fourth in her heat with a time of 51.33 seconds, which was enough to qualify for the next round as the fastest loser. However, in the semifinal, she finished fifth in her race with a time of 51.61 seconds, and did not advance to the final. In the women's 800 metres, Burnett finished fourth in her preliminary heat, and qualified for the semifinal. In the second semifinal, she finished seventh among the eight runners, and did not qualify for the final.

Athlete	Event	Heat		Semifinal		Final	
Athlete	Event	Result	Rank	Result	Rank	Result	Rank
Marian Burnett	Women's 800 m	2:02.12	4 q	2:02.21	7	did not advance	
Aliann Pompey	Women's 400 m	51.33	4 q	51.61	5	did not advance	

Key

- Note–Ranks given for track events are within the athlete's heat only
- Q = Qualified for the next round
- q = Qualified for the next round as a fastest loser or, in field events, by position without achieving the qualifying target
- NR = National record
- N/A = Round not applicable for the event
- Bye = Athlete not required to compete in round

== Swimming ==
Guyana entered a single swimmer for the Games. Onan Orlando Thom competed in the men's 100 m freestyle. This was the first Olympic appearance for Onan Orlando Thom.

The swimming events were held at the Athens Olympic Aquatic Centre in Marousi, Athens. In the men's 100 metre freestyle heat on 17 August 2004, Thom finished sixth in the second preliminary heat with a time of 55.24 seconds. He was ranked 59th amongst the 69 competitors and did not advance to the semi-finals.

Athlete	Event	Heat		Semifinal		Final	
Athlete	Event	Time	Rank	Time	Rank	Time	Rank
Onan Orlando Thom	Men's 100 m freestyle	55.24	59	did not advance			

== Weightlifting ==
Guyana entered a single weightlifter for the Games. Julian McWatt competed in the men's −85 kg |125. McWatt, who was born in the United Kingdom, made his Olympic debut at the Games.

The weightlifting events were held at the Nikaia Olympic Weightlifting Hall, Nikaia. The event was held on 21 August 2004 and there were 21 competitors representing 19 nations. The event consists of two categories–snatch, and clean & jerk with the best of three lifts in each category counted for the final total.

McWatt lifted a total of 272.5 kg, with 125 kg in snatch and 147.5 kg in clean & jerk to finish 14th and last amongst the finishers. He lifted 125 kg, the least of the 18 lifters who were classified in the snatch category. In the 17 participants who made it to the clean & jerk, McWatt finished 14th and last of the classified lifters with a best lift of 147.5 kg.

Athlete	Event	Snatch		Clean & Jerk		Total	Rank
Athlete	Event	Result	Rank	Result	Rank	Total	Rank
Julian McWatt	Men's −85 kg	125	18	147.5	14	272.5	14

== See also ==
- Guyana at the 2003 Pan American Games
