= Guyana at the 1992 Summer Olympics =

- IOC code: GUY
- NOC: Guyana Olympic Association

in Barcelona
- Competitors: 6 (5 men, 1 woman) in 3 sports
- Flag bearer: Aubrey Richmond
- Medals: Gold 0 Silver 0 Bronze 0 Total 0

Summer Olympics appearances (overview)
- 1948; 1952; 1956; 1960; 1964; 1968; 1972; 1976; 1980; 1984; 1988; 1992; 1996; 2000; 2004; 2008; 2012; 2016; 2020; 2024

Guyana competed at the 1992 Summer Olympics in Barcelona, Spain. A total of six athletes, five men and one woman, competed for the nation in three sports.

== Competitors ==
The following is the list of number of competitors in the Games.

| Sport | Men | Women | Total |
|---|---|---|---|
| Athletics | 2 | 1 | 3 |
| Boxing | 2 | – | 2 |
| Cycling | 1 | 0 | 1 |
| Total | 5 | 1 | 6 |

== Athletic ==
Men's Long Jump

- Mark Mason

- Qualification – 7.83 m (→ did not advance)

Women's High Jump

- Najuma Fletcher

- Qualification – 1.79 m (→ did not advance)

== Cycling ==
One male cyclist represented Guyana in 1992.

Men's road race

- Aubrey Richmond

Men's points race

- Aubrey Richmond

== See also ==
- Guyana at the 1991 Pan American Games
