= Guyana at the 2000 Summer Olympics =

- IOC code: GUY
- NOC: Guyana Olympic Association

in Sydney
- Competitors: 4 in 1 sport
- Flag bearer: Aliann Pompey
- Medals: Gold 0 Silver 0 Bronze 0 Total 0

Summer Olympics appearances (overview)
- 1948; 1952; 1956; 1960; 1964; 1968; 1972; 1976; 1980; 1984; 1988; 1992; 1996; 2000; 2004; 2008; 2012; 2016; 2020; 2024

Guyana competed at the 2000 Summer Olympics in Sydney, Australia held between 15 September and 1 October 2000. It was the nation's thirteenth appearance at the Summer Olympics including the five appearances (1948 to 1964) as British Guiana. The Guyanese delegation consisted of three athletes competing in two sports. It did not win any medals at the Games.

== Background ==
The Guyana Olympic Association was created in 1935 and recognized by the International Olympic Committee on 27 July 1948 at the IOC session in London, enabling British Guiana to make its Olympic debut at the 1948 Summer Olympics. It appeared in five editions (1948 to 1964) as British Guiana, and later as Guyana since the 1968 Summer Olympics. Guyana had participated in every Summer Olympics since its debut except the 1976 Summer Olympics, which it boycotted in support of the African nations. The 2000 Summer Olympics was the nation's thirteenth appearance at the Summer Olympics.

The 2000 Summer Olympics were held in Sydney, Australia between 15 September and 1 October 2000. Sprinter Aliann Pompey served as Guyana's flag-bearer at the opening ceremony. The country did not win a medal in the 2000 Summer Olympics.

== Competitors ==
The Guyanese delegation consisted of four athletes competing in a single sport.

Sport	Men	Women	Total
Athletics	3	1	4
Total	3	1	4

== Athletics ==
Guyana was represented by four athletes in the athletics events. Ian Roberts participated in the men's 800 m, Charles Allen in the 110 m hurdles, and Paul Tucker in the 400 m hurdles. Aliann Pompey was the lone female competitor, competing in the 400 m event. This was the second Olympic appearance for Tucker, while other made their Olympic debut.

Men

Roberts was associated with St. John's University, New York, where he competed in the Big East Conference, winning several championships. He had set a personal best of 1:46.85 in the 800 metres in 1999 before the Olympics. Allen, who was born in Georgetown, Guyana, emigrated to Canada, and represented the Clemson Tigers track and field team. He adopted Guyana citizenship on 18 July 2000, ahead of the Olympics. Tucker had competed in the 110 m hurdles in the 1996 Summer Olympics.

The athletic events were held at the Olympic Stadium, Olympic Park, Sydney. None of the male athletes made it out of the preliminary heats. In the 800 metres, Roberts finished in the penultimate place in the fourth heat, and failed to qualify for the next round. Allen competed in the first heat, and finished fifth with a time of 14.21 seconds, which was not enough to progress to the next round. In the 400 metres hurdles, Tucker finished sixth in heat seven, and did not make it to the further rounds either.

Athlete	Event	Heat		Quarterfinal		Semifinal		Final	
Athlete	Event	Result	Rank	Result	Rank	Result	Rank	Result	Rank
Ian Roberts	800 m	1:52.32	7	—N/a		Did not advance			
Charles Allen	110 m hurdles	14.21	5	Did not advance					
Paul Tucker	400 m hurdles	50.92	6	—N/a		Did not advance			

Women

Pompey, who was born in Guyana, moved to the United States at the age of 14. She studied at the Manhattan College, and won the 2000 NCAA Division I Outdoor Track and Field Championships in the women's 400 metres.

In the women's 400 metres preliminary rounds held on 22 September, Pompey finished fifth in her heat with a time of 53.09 seconds, which was enough to qualify for the next round as the fastest loser. However, in the quarterfinal, she finished last in her race with a time of 53.42 seconds, and did not advance to the semifinals.

Athlete	Event	Heat		Quarterfinal		Semifinal		Final	
Athlete	Event	Result	Rank	Result	Rank	Result	Rank	Result	Rank
Aliann Pompey	400 m	53.09	5 q	53.42	8	Did not advance			

Key

- Note–Ranks given for track events are within the athlete's heat only
- Q = Qualified for the next round by position in race or, in field events, by achieving the automatic qualification target
- q = Qualified for the next round as a fastest loser or, in field events, by position without achieving the qualifying target

== See also ==
- Guyana at the 1999 Pan American Games
