= Guyana at the 2009 World Championships in Athletics =

- WA code: GUY

in Berlin
- Competitors: 3 (1 man, 2 women)
- Medals: Gold 0 Silver 0 Bronze 0 Total 0

World Championships in Athletics appearances
- 1983; 1987; 1991; 1993; 1995; 1997; 1999; 2001; 2003; 2005; 2007; 2009; 2011; 2013; 2015; 2017; 2019; 2022; 2023; 2025

Guyana competed at the 2009 World Championships in Athletics in Berlin, Germany, which were held from 15 to 23 August 2009. The athlete delegation consisted of three athletes, sprinters Adam Harris and Aliann Pompey and middle-distance runner Marian Burnett. Harris competed in the men's 100 and 200 metres, advancing to the quarterfinals of the former while he failed to make it past the qualifiers of the latter. Pompey competed in the women's 400 metres and reached the semifinals, setting a Guyanese national record. Burnett competed in the women's 800 metres and advanced to the semifinals.

== Background ==
The 2009 World Championships in Athletics were held at the Olympiastadion in Berlin, Germany. Under the auspices of the International Amateur Athletic Federation, this was the twelfth edition of the World Championships. It was held from 15 to 23 August 2009 and had 47 different events. Among the competing teams was Guyana. For this edition of the World Championships in Athletics, sprinters Adam Harris and Aliann Pompey and middle-distance runner Marian Burnett competed for the nation.

== Results ==
=== Men ===
Harris first competed in the qualifying heats of the men's 100 metres on 15 August in the 12th heat against seven other competitors. There, he recorded a time of 10.35 seconds and placed third, advancing to the quarterfinals. He competed in the first quarterfinal against seven other athletes and placed fifth with a time of 10.39 seconds, failing to advance to the semifinals. He then competed in the qualifying heats of the men's 200 metres on 18 August in the first heat. There, he recorded a time of 21.28 seconds and placed fourth, failing to advance further to the quarterfinals.

Event	Athletes	Heats		Quarterfinals		Semifinal		Final	
Event	Athletes	Result	Rank	Result	Rank	Result	Rank	Result	Rank
100 m	Adam Harris	10.35	3	10.39	5	did not advance			
200 m	Adam Harris	21.28	4	-		did not advance			

=== Women ===
Pompey competed in the qualifying heats of the women's 400 metres on 15 August in the fifth heat against six other competitors. There, she recorded a time of 51.38 seconds and placed third, advancing further to the quarterfinals. She competed in the first quarterfinal against eight other competitors. There, she recorded a time of 50.71 seconds for a new Guyanese national record and placed fourth, failing to advance further to the finals.

Burnett competed in the qualifying heats of the women's 800 metres on 16 August in the third heat against seven other competitors. There, she recorded a time of 2:03.89 and placed fifth, advancing to the semifinals as she was part of the six next fastest athletes outside of the top three of each heat. The semifinals were held the following day and she competed in second semifinal against eight other competitors. There, she placed eighth with a time of 2:02.75 and did not advance to the finals.

Event	Athletes	Heats		Semifinal		Final	
Event	Athletes	Result	Rank	Result	Rank	Result	Rank
400 m	Aliann Pompey	51.38	3	50.71 NR	4	did not advance	
800 m	Marian Burnett	2:03.89	5	2:02.75	8	did not advance	
