= British Guiana at the 1960 Summer Olympics =

- Flag of British Guiana
- IOC code: BGU (GUA used at these Games)
- NOC: National Olympic Committee of British Guiana

in Rome
- Competitors: 5 (4 men and 1 woman) in 2 sports
- Medals: Gold 0 Silver 0 Bronze 0 Total 0

Summer Olympics appearances (overview)
- 1948; 1952; 1956; 1960; 1964; 1968; 1972; 1976; 1980; 1984; 1988; 1992; 1996; 2000; 2004; 2008; 2012; 2016; 2020; 2024

British Guiana (now Guyana) competed at the 1960 Summer Olympics in Rome, Italy.

== Results by event ==
=== Athletics ===
Men's 200 metres

- Clayton Glasgow

Men's 400 metres

- Clayton Glasgow

Men's 800 metres

- Ralph Gomes

Men's 5,000 metres

- George De Peana

Women's High Jump

- Brenda Archer

=== Boxing ===
Men's Light-Heavyweight

- Carl Crawford
