= British Guiana at the 1964 Summer Olympics =

- Flag of British Guiana
- IOC code: BGU (GUI used at these Games)
- NOC: National Olympic Committee of British Guiana

in Tokyo
- Competitors: 1
- Medals: Gold 0 Silver 0 Bronze 0 Total 0

Summer Olympics appearances (overview)
- 1948; 1952; 1956; 1960; 1964; 1968; 1972; 1976; 1980; 1984; 1988; 1992; 1996; 2000; 2004; 2008; 2012; 2016; 2020; 2024

British Guiana competed at the 1964 Summer Olympics in Tokyo, Japan held from 10 to 24 October 1964. It was the nation's fifth appearance at the Summer Olympics, and the last appearance as British Guiana. The Guyanese delegation consisted of a single athlete, weightlifter Martin Dias, who did not win any medals.

== Background ==
The Guyana Olympic Association was established in 1935 and recognized by the International Olympic Committee on 27 July 1948 at the IOC session in London, enabling British Guiana to make its Olympic debut at the 1948 Summer Olympics. It has since participated in every Olympics, and the 1964 Summer Olympics was the nation's fifth appearance at the Summer Olympics. It had appeared in all these editions as British Guiana, and this was the last such edition as it later appeared as Guyana since the 1968 Summer Olympics. The Guyanese delegation consisted of a single athlete, weightlifter Martin Dias, who did not win any medals.

== Competitors ==
The Guyanese delegation consisted of a single athlete.

Sport	Men	Women	Total
Weightlifting	1	0	1
Total	1	0	1

== Weightlifting ==
Martin Dias represented British Guiana in the men's 56 kg (bantam weight) category. He was a jeweler, and started weightlifting part time to keep himself fit. He won a silver in the bantam weight category at the 1962 Central American and Caribbean Games, and a bronze at the 1962 Commonwealth Games. In 1963, he won the gold medal at the 1963 Pan American Games.

The event was held on 11 October 1964 at Shibuya Kokaido, Shibuya. There were 24 competitors representing 18 nations. The event consists of three categories–military press, snatch, and clean & jerk with the best of three lifts in each category counted for the final total. In the military press, Dias failed to do a clean lift in his first two attempts, and cleared 100 kg in his third and final attempt to be placed equal ninth. In the snatch event that followed, he lifted 102.5 kg to finish equal fifth. He cleared 97.5 kg in his first attempt, and 102.5 in his second attempt, while failing to lift 105 kg in his final attempt. In the clean & jerk, he lifted 132.5 to be placed seventh on the table. He failed to lift 127.5 kg in his first attempt before clearing it in the second. In the third and final attempt, he lifted five more kilograms. He lifted 335 kg in total to finish eighth overall.

Athlete	Event	Weight				Rank
Athlete	Event	Military Press	Snatch	Clean and jerk	Total	Rank
Martin Dias	Men's 56 kg	100	102.5	132.5	335	8
