= Guyana at the 1972 Summer Olympics =

- IOC code: GUY
- NOC: Guyana Olympic Association

in Munich
- Competitors: 3 in 2 sports
- Flag bearer: Gordon Sankis
- Medals: Gold 0 Silver 0 Bronze 0 Total 0

Summer Olympics appearances (overview)
- 1948; 1952; 1956; 1960; 1964; 1968; 1972; 1976; 1980; 1984; 1988; 1992; 1996; 2000; 2004; 2008; 2012; 2016; 2020; 2024

Guyana competed at the 1972 Summer Olympics in Munich, West Germany held between 26 August and 11 September 1972. It was the nation's seventh appearance at the Summer Olympics including the five appearances (1948 to 1964) as British Guiana. The Guyanese delegation consisted of three athletes competing in two sports. It did not win any medals at the Games.

== Background ==
The Guyana Olympic Association was created in 1935 and recognized by the International Olympic Committee on 27 July 1948 at the IOC session in London, enabling British Guiana to make its Olympic debut at the 1948 Summer Olympics. It appeared in five editions (1948 to 1964) as British Guiana, and later as Guyana since the 1968 Summer Olympics. The 1972 Summer Olympics was the nation's seventh consecutive appearance at the Summer Olympics.

The 1972 Summer Olympics were held in Munich, West Germany between 26 August and 11 September 1972. Gordon Sankis served as Guyana's flag-bearer at the opening ceremony. The country did not win a medal in the 1972 Summer Olympics.

== Competitors ==
The Guyanese delegation consisted of three athletes competing in two sports.

| Sport | Men | Women | Total |
|---|---|---|---|
| Boxing | 2 | 0 | 2 |
| Swimming | 1 | 0 | 1 |
| Total | 3 | 0 | 3 |

== Boxing ==
Guyana was represented by two athletes in the boxing events, Courtney Atherly in the men's lightweight and Reginald Ford in the men's light middleweight categories. This was Guyana's third appearance in the sport at the Summer Olympics, and both Atherly and Ford were making their Olympic debut. Atherly had won a bronze in the 1970 Commonwealth Games in the bantamweight category. Ford was a bronze medalist at the 1971 Pan American Games.

The boxing events were held at Boxhalle, Olympiapark, Munich. Both the athletes received byes into the round of 32 in their respective categories. In the men's lightweight round of 32 match, Athely competed against Antonio Gin of Mexico. Atherly lost the contest by a points decision after four of the five judges ruled the contest in favor of his opponent. In the light middleweight, Ford faced Alan Minter of Great Britain. The referee stopped the contest in the second round after Ford was knocked out.

| Athlete | Event | Round of 64 | Round of 32 | Round of 16 | Quarterfinals | Semifinals | Final | |
| Athlete | Event | Opposition Result | Opposition Result | Opposition Result | Opposition Result | Opposition Result | Opposition Result | Rank |
|---|---|---|---|---|---|---|---|---|
| Courtney Atherly | Men's lightweight | Bye | Gin (MEX); L 1–4 | Did not advance | | | | |
| Reginald Ford | Men's light middleweight | Bye | Minter (GBR); LKO | Did not advance | | | | |

LKO - Lost by knock out

== Cycling ==
Guyana was represented by Neville Hunte in the cycling event. This was Guyana's third appearance in the sport at the Summer Olympics, and Hunte was making their Olympic debut.

The track cycling events were held at Radstadion, Olympiapark, Munich. In the men's sprint, Hunte was disqualified in heat 17 of Round One, while competing against Robert Maveau and Victor Limba. In the repechage round, he finished first in the three way competition with Taworn Tawan and Manu Snellinx. In Round Two, he lost to Daniel Morelon of France. In the repechage round that followed, he finished behind Omar Pkhak'adze and Ernie Crutchlow and failed to make it to the next round. In the men's 1000m time trial, he finished 22nd with a time of one minute and 10.48 seconds, nearly four seconds behind the gold medalist Niels Fredborg of Denmark.

| Athlete | Event | Round One | | Round One Repechage | | Round Two | | Round Two Repechage | | 1/8 final | | 1/8 final Repechage 1 | | 1/8 final Repechage 2 | | Quarterfinal | | Semifinal | | Final | |
| Athlete | Event | Time | Rank | Time | Rank | Time | Rank | Time | Rank | Time | Rank | Time | Rank | Time | Rank | Time | Rank | Time | Rank | Time | Rank |
|---|---|---|---|---|---|---|---|---|---|---|---|---|---|---|---|---|---|---|---|---|---|
| Neville Hunte | Men's sprint | DSQ | | 11.54 | 1 Q | – | 2 | – | 3 | Did not qualify | | | | | | | | | | | |

| Athlete | Event | Time | Rank |
|---|---|---|---|
| Neville Hunte | Men's 1000m time trial | 1:10.48 | 22 |
