= Guyana at the 1983 World Championships in Athletics =

- Flag of Guyana
- WA code: GUY

in Helsinki, Finland August 7–14, 1983
- Competitors: 3 (1 man and 2 women) in 4 events
- Medals: Gold 0 Silver 0 Bronze 0 Total 0

World Championships in Athletics appearances
- 1983; 1987; 1991; 1993; 1995; 1997; 1999; 2001; 2003; 2005; 2007; 2009; 2011; 2013; 2015; 2017; 2019; 2022; 2023

Guyana competed at the 1983 World Championships in Athletics in Helsinki, Finland, from August 7 to 14, 1983.

== Men ==
Track and road events

Athlete	Event	Heat		Quarterfinal		Semifinal		Final	
Athlete	Event	Result	Rank	Result	Rank	Result	Rank	Result	Rank
Earl Haley	100 metres	10.77	42	Did not advance					
Earl Haley	200 metres	21.55	31 q	21.39w	26	Did not advance			

== Women ==
Track and road events

Athlete	Event	Heat		Quarterfinal		Semifinal		Final	
Athlete	Event	Result	Rank	Result	Rank	Result	Rank	Result	Rank
June Griffith	400 metres	54.02	18 Q	53.47	19	Did not advance			

Field events

Athlete	Event	Qualification		Final	
Athlete	Event	Distance	Position	Distance	Position
Jennifer Innis	Long jump	6.45	10 Q	6.54	11
