= Guyana at the Olympics =

- IOC code: GUY
- NOC: Guyana Olympic Association
- Medals Ranked 151st: Gold 0 Silver 0 Bronze 1 Total 1

Summer appearances
- 1948; 1952; 1956; 1960; 1964; 1968; 1972; 1976; 1980; 1984; 1988; 1992; 1996; 2000; 2004; 2008; 2012; 2016; 2020; 2024; 2028

Guyana has competed in 19 Summer Olympic Games. The nation has never competed in the Winter Olympic Games. In the first 5 games the nation appeared as British Guiana before it gained independence. The country has won a single medal, a bronze in boxing won by Michael Anthony at the 1980 Summer Olympics. During the colonial era of British Guiana, Guyanese athletes Jack London and Phil Edwards won Olympic medals in the 1920s competing for Great Britain and Canada, respectively.

The Guyana Olympic Association was created in 1935 and recognized by the International Olympic Committee in 1948.

== Medal tables ==
=== Medals by Summer Games ===
Games	Athletes	Gold	Silver	Bronze	Total	Rank
1948 London	4	0	0	0	0	–
1952 Helsinki	1	0	0	0	0	–
1956 Melbourne	4	0	0	0	0	–
1960 Rome	5	0	0	0	0	–
1964 Tokyo	1	0	0	0	0	–
1968 Mexico City	5	0	0	0	0	–
1972 Munich	3	0	0	0	0	–
1976 Montreal	did not participate					
1980 Moscow	8	0	0	1	1	35
1984 Los Angeles	10	0	0	0	0	–
1988 Seoul	8	0	0	0	0	–
1992 Barcelona	6	0	0	0	0	–
1996 Atlanta	7	0	0	0	0	–
2000 Sydney	4	0	0	0	0	–
2004 Athens	4	0	0	0	0	–
2008 Beijing	4	0	0	0	0	–
2012 London	6	0	0	0	0	–
2016 Rio de Janeiro	6	0	0	0	0	–
2020 Tokyo	7	0	0	0	0	–
2024 Paris	5	0	0	0	0	–
2028 Los Angeles	future event					
2032 Brisbane	future event					
Total		0	0	1	1	151

=== Medals by sport ===
Sport	Gold	Silver	Bronze	Total
Boxing	0	0	1	1
Totals (1 entries)	0	0	1	1

== List of medalists ==
Medal	Name	Games	Sport	Event
Bronze	Michael Anthony	1980 Moscow	Boxing	Men's bantamweight

== See also ==
- List of flag bearers for Guyana at the Olympics
