= British Guiana at the 1956 Summer Olympics =

- Flag of British Guiana
- IOC code: BGU
- NOC: National Olympic Committee of British Guiana

in Melbourne/Stockholm
- Medals: Gold 0 Silver 0 Bronze 0 Total 0

Summer Olympics appearances (overview)
- 1948; 1952; 1956; 1960; 1964; 1968; 1972; 1976; 1980; 1984; 1988; 1992; 1996; 2000; 2004; 2008; 2012; 2016; 2020; 2024

British Guiana (now Guyana) competed at the 1956 Summer Olympics in Melbourne, Australia.

== Athletics ==
Participant	Event	Result	Performance
Oliver Hunter	100m (men)	40th	serie 10: 5th in 11,22
Oliver Hunter	200m (men)	46th	serie 7: 4th in 22,54
Claudette Masdammer	100m (women)	32nd	serie 6: 5th in 12,7
Claudette Masdammer	200m (women)	21st	serie 4: 4th in 25,4

== Weightlifting ==
Participant	Event	Result	Performance
Henry Swain	-56kg (men)	13th	clean and press: 12th with 80kg snatch: 12th with 82,5kg clean and jerk: 12th with 110kg total: 272,5kg
Winston McArthur	-75kg (men)	11th	clean and press: 11th with 140kg snatch: 12th with 100kg clean and jerk: 6th with 112,5kg total: 352,5kg
