= Guyana at the 2011 World Championships in Athletics =

- WA code: GUY
- National federation: Athletics Association of Guyana

in Daegu
- Competitors: 1
- Medals: Gold 0 Silver 0 Bronze 0 Total 0

World Championships in Athletics appearances
- 1983; 1987; 1991; 1993; 1995; 1997; 1999; 2001; 2003; 2005; 2007; 2009; 2011; 2013; 2015; 2017; 2019; 2022; 2023

Guyana competed at the 2011 World Championships in Athletics from August 27 to September 4 in Daegu, South Korea. One athlete, 400m sprinter Aliann Pompey, was announced to represent the country in the event.

== Results ==
=== Women ===
Athlete	Event	Preliminaries		Heats		Semifinals		Final	
Athlete	Event	Time Width Height	Rank	Time Width Height	Rank	Time Width Height	Rank	Time Width Height	Rank
Aliann Pompey	400 metres			53.59	25	Did not advance			
