= Guyana at the 1996 Summer Olympics =

- IOC code: GUY
- NOC: Guyana Olympic Association

in Atlanta
- Competitors: 7 in 2 sports
- Flag bearer: John Douglas
- Medals: Gold 0 Silver 0 Bronze 0 Total 0

Summer Olympics appearances (overview)
- 1948; 1952; 1956; 1960; 1964; 1968; 1972; 1976; 1980; 1984; 1988; 1992; 1996; 2000; 2004; 2008; 2012; 2016; 2020; 2024

Guyana competed at the 1996 Summer Olympics in Atlanta, United States.

== Competitors ==
The following is the list of number of competitors in the Games.

Sport	Men	Women	Total
Athletics	5	1	6
Boxing	1	–	1
Total	6	1	7

== Athletics ==
Key

- Note–Ranks given for track events are within the athlete's heat only
- Q = Qualified for the next round
- q = Qualified for the next round as a fastest loser or, in field events, by position without achieving the qualifying target

Men

Track & road events

Athlete	Event	Heat		Quarterfinal		Semifinal		Final	
Athlete	Event	Time	Rank	Time	Rank	Time	Rank	Time	Rank
Lancelot Gittens	400 m hurdles	54.79	8	—N/a		did not advance			
Andrew Harry; Roger Gill; Lancelot Gittens; Richard Jones	4 × 400 m relay	DQ		—N/a		did not advance			

Women

Field events

Athlete	Event	Qualifying		Final	
Athlete	Event	Result	Rank	Result	Rank
Nicola Martial	Triple jump	12.91	24	did not advance	

== Boxing ==
Athlete	Event	Round of 32	Round of 16	Quarterfinal	Semifinal	Final	
Athlete	Event	Opponent Result	Opponent Result	Opponent Result	Opponent Result	Opponent Result	Rank
John Douglas	Light heavyweight	Drviš (CRO); L RSC-2	did not advance				
