= Guyana at the 1968 Summer Olympics =

- IOC code: GUY
- NOC: Guyana Olympic Association

in Mexico City
- Competitors: 5 in 4 sports
- Medals: Gold 0 Silver 0 Bronze 0 Total 0

Summer Olympics appearances (overview)
- 1948; 1952; 1956; 1960; 1964; 1968; 1972; 1976; 1980; 1984; 1988; 1992; 1996; 2000; 2004; 2008; 2012; 2016; 2020; 2024

Guyana competed at the 1968 Summer Olympics in Mexico City, Mexico. This was the first time participating as an independent nation.

They fielded five competitors, all men.

== Results by event ==
=== Athletics ===
Men's marathon

- Harry Prowell — 2:57.01.4 hrs (→ 50th place)

=== Boxing ===
Bantamweight (54 kg)

- Dhanraj Singh

- Round 2 - Lost to Samuel Mbugua of Kenya

Middleweight (75 kg)

- Charles Amos

- Round of 16 - Lost to Wiesław Rudkowski of Poland

=== Cycling ===
1000 metres time trial

- Aubrey Bryce — 1:12.73 min (→ 31st place)

Sprint

- Aubrey Bryce

- Round 1 — 3rd place in heat (→ advanced to repechage)
- Repechage — 3rd place in heat (→ did not advance)

=== Weightlifting ===
Light heavyweight (82.5 kg)

- Rudolph James

- Press — 120.0
- Snatch — 127.5
- Snatch — 165.0
- Total — 412.5 (→ 19th place)
