= Guyana at the 2022 World Athletics Championships =

- Flag of Guyana
- WA code: GUY

in Eugene, United States 15 July 2022 – 24 July 2022
- Competitors: 3 (1 man and 2 women)
- Medals: Gold 0 Silver 0 Bronze 0 Total 0

World Athletics Championships appearances
- 1983; 1987; 1991; 1993; 1995; 1997; 1999; 2001; 2003; 2005; 2007; 2009; 2011; 2013; 2015; 2017; 2019; 2022; 2023

Guyana competed at the 2022 World Athletics Championships in Eugene, United States, from 15 to 24 July 2022.

== Results ==
Guyana entered 3 athletes, all of whom are sprinters.

Key

- Q = Qualified for the next round
- q = Qualified for the next round as a fastest loser or, in field events, by position without achieving the qualifying target
- NR = National record
- PB = Personal best
- SB = Season best
- N/A = Round not applicable for the event

=== Men ===
Track and road events

Athlete	Event	Preliminary		Heat		Semi-final		Final	
Athlete	Event	Result	Rank	Result	Rank	Result	Rank	Result	Rank
Emanuel Archibald	100 m	10.31 (+1.1)	1 Q	10.24 (+0.1)	39	did not advance			

=== Women ===
Track and road events

Athlete	Event	Heat		Semi-final		Final	
Athlete	Event	Result	Rank	Result	Rank	Result	Rank
Jasmine Abrams	100 m	11.55 (+0.1)	40	did not advance			
Aliyah Abrams	400 m	51.98	21 Q	51.79	18	did not advance	
