= James Gilkes =

Guyanese sprinter

Personal information
- Nationality: Guyanese
- Born: 21 September 1952 (age 73)
- Height: 188 cm (6 ft 2 in)
- Weight: 72 kg (159 lb)

Sport
- Sport: Athletics
- Event: Sprints
- Club: University of Southern California
Medal record
Men's Athletics
Representing Guyana
Pan American Games
Gold medal – first place	1975 Mexico City	200 metres
Silver medal – second place	1979 San Juan	200 metres
Commonwealth Games
Silver medal – second place	1978 Edmonton	200 metres
Golden Sprints
Bronze medal – third place	1979 Zurich	Sprints

James Wren Gilkes (born 21 September 1952) is a former sprinter from Guyana who specialised in the 200 metres. He competed at two Olympic Games.

== Career ==
He was the 1975 Pan American 200 metre champion, and in 1979 he took the silver medal in the same event.

He was runner up to Don Quarrie of Jamaica in the 1978 AAA's 200 metres event. At the 1978 Commonwealth Games in Edmonton he finished fourth in the 100 metre final, then took the silver medal in the 200 metres, finishing behind Allan Wells of Scotland.

In 1978, Gilkes was denied a world record for the 4x200 m relay; while the Tobias Striders team he was a member of broke the old world record with a time of 1:20.23, but this was rejected as a record because the team members were from different countries. The other members of the team were: Guy Abrahams, Panama; Michael Simmons, USA; and Don Quarrie, Jamaica.

The team from the University of Southern California (Joel Andrews, James Sanford, William Mullins and Clancy Edwards) that finished second in the same race also broke the old world record: their time of 1:20.26 was accepted as the new world record.

In 1979 he took 3rd place in the "Golden sprints" in Zurich.

Gilkes would have been a medal favorite in the 200 m (which Don Quarrie won) at the 1976 Olympic Games in Montreal, but Guyana joined the African boycott over New Zealand's rugby team's tour of apartheid South Africa. He applied to the International Olympic Committee (IOC) for permission to run as an individual under their flag but was denied the request. He also went to the 1980 Olympic Games where he reached the semi-finals of both the 100 and 200 metres before he was eliminated.

His personal best time for the 200 metres was 20.14 seconds, achieved in September 1978 in Ingelheim.

Gilkes studied first at Fisk University then moved to the University of Southern California (USC). He was an important member of the track team at both colleges. As of 2012, Gilkes was still ranked in the top 10 all-time performers for the USC Trojans at 100 and 200 m, joint 8th and 4th respectively.

He enjoyed success for both colleges at the NCAA (USA Collegiate) championships, including a win at 220 yards in 1974:

- 1974 (for Fisk) – 6th in 100 y; 1st in 220 y
- 1975 (for USC) – 2nd in 200 m
- 1976 (for USC) – 3rd in 100 m; 2nd in 200 m.

Gilkes joined Fisk University when it started a student transfer program with his native country of Guyana in 1972. Gilkes remained at Fisk University until 1974, when he transferred to USC. He has stated he was not unhappy at Fisk but did not enjoy the Tennessee weather and preferred the sunnier climes of California.

== Rankings ==
Gilkes was ranked in the top ten 100 and 200 m sprinters in the world from 1974 to 1979, according to the votes of the experts of Track and Field News.

100 meters
Year	100 m	200 m
1974	-	3rd
1975	9th	3rd
1976	9th	6th
1977	-	-
1978	-	3rd
1979	-	3rd

== USA Championships ==
Gilkes when in the United States was eligible at that time to compete in the USA National Track and Field Championships. He achieved the feat of finishing second in the 200 m five years running.

USA Championships
Year	100m	200m
1974	-	2nd
1975	-	2nd
1976	-	2nd
1977	5th	2nd
1978	6th	2nd

== See also ==
- James Gilkes at World Athletics
- James Gilkes, Friends of Guyana Athletics, Spotlight Corner.

Olympic Games
Preceded by	Flagbearer for Guyana; Moscow 1980	Succeeded by Earl Haley
