= Cecil Moore (weightlifter) =

Guyanese weightlifter (1929–2025)

Personal information
- Nationality: Guyanese
- Born: 1 November 1929 Bartica, Guyana
- Died: 16 August 2025 (aged 95) North York, Canada

Sport
- Sport: Weightlifting

Cecil Albert Anthony Moore (1 November 1929 – 16 August 2025) was a Guyanese weightlifter. He competed in the men's light heavyweight event at the 1952 Summer Olympics.
