= Laddie Lewis =

Guyanese cyclist (born 1915)

Personal information
- Full name: Lionel F. Lewis
- Born: 1915

Cycling career
- Sport: Cycling
- Disciplines: Road cycling Track cycling

Lionel F. "Laddie" Lewis (born 1915, date of death unknown) was a Guyanese track and road cyclist. He competed in both disciplines in a total of three events at the 1948 Summer Olympics. He finished among others 21st in the track cycling time trial. He was the stepfather of Guyanese politician Lindley GeBorde. He was Guyana's longest-reigning champion and was described by GeBorde as "the hero of the whole country."
