= Raul Lall =

Guyanese judoka

Personal information
- Born: July 27, 1994 (age 31) Georgetown, Guyana
- Occupation: Judoka
- Weight: 59 kg (130 lb)

Sport
- Sport: Judo

Profile at external databases
- IJF: 11043
- JudoInside.com: 80553

Raúl Lall (born July 27, 1994) is a Guyanese judoka who competes in the men's 60 kg category. At the 2012 Summer Olympics, he was defeated in the second round by Eisa Majrashi.
