= Clayton Glasgow =

Guyanese sprinter

Personal information
- Nationality: Guyanese
- Born: 10 March 1937 Georgetown, British Guiana
- Died: 25 February 2020 (aged 82)

Sport
- Sport: Sprinting
- Event: 200 metres

Clayton Glasgow (10 March 1937 – 25 February 2020) was a Guyanese sprinter. He competed in the men's 200 metres and men's 400 metres at the 1960 Summer Olympics.
