= Andrew Fowler (swimmer) =

Guyanese swimmer

Personal information
- Nationality: Guyana
- Born: 9 December 1995 (age 30)

Sport
- Sport: Swimming

Andrew Fowler (born 9 December 1995) is a Guyanese swimmer. He competed in the 2020 Summer Olympics.

Olympic Games
Preceded by Hannibal Gaskin	Flagbearer for Guyana (with Chelsea Edghill); Tokyo 2020	Succeeded by Emanuel Archibald; Chelsea Edghill
