= Hannibal Gaskin =

Guyanese swimmer

Personal information
- Full name: Hannibal David Gaskin
- National team: Guyana
- Born: 30 August 1997 (age 29) Georgetown, Guyana

Sport
- Sport: Swimming
- Strokes: Butterfly
- Club: Dorado Speed Swim Club (Guyana)

Hannibal Gaskin (born August 30, 1997) is a Guyanese swimmer. He competed at the 2016 Summer Olympics (Rio de Janeiro) in the men's 100 metre butterfly event; his time of 58.57 seconds in the heats did not qualify him for the semifinals. He was the flag bearer for Guyana at the Parade of Nations.

He competed at the 2015 in Kazan (Russia) and 2017 World Aquatics Championships in Budapest (Hungary). He also competed at the 2014 Summer Youth Olympics (Nanjing, China) and the 2012 (Istanbul, Turkey) and 2017 World Swimming Championships (25m) (Windsor, Canada).

Olympic Games
| Preceded by Winston George | Flag bearer for Guyana; Rio de Janeiro 2016 | Succeeded by Chelsea Edghill; Andrew Fowler |
