= John Douglas (boxer) =

Guyanese boxer (born 1971)

Personal information
- Nationality: Guyanese
- Born: 27 March 1971 (age 54); Georgetown, Guyana

Sport
- Sport: Boxing

John Douglas (born 27 March 1971) is a Guyanese former professional boxer who competed from 1997 to 2010. As an amateur, he competed in the men's light heavyweight event at the 1996 Summer Olympics. Douglas lost his first professional fight in a KO against Wayne Braithwaite (Braithwaite's professional debut) at the Cliff Anderson Sports Hall.

Olympic Games
Preceded by Aubrey Richmond	Flagbearer for Guyana; Atlanta 1996	Succeeded by Aliann Pompey
