= Aubrey Richmond =

Guyanese cyclist

Personal information
- Born: 14 November 1957
- Died: 3 February 2025 (aged 67)

Cycling career
- Sport: Cycling

Aubrey Richmond (14 November 1957 – 3 February 2025) was a Guyanese cyclist. He competed at the 1984 Summer Olympics and the 1992 Summer Olympics. He was the flag bearer for Guyana at the opening ceremony of the 1992 Summer Olympics.

Olympic Games
Preceded by Alfred Thomas	Flagbearer for Guyana; Barcelona 1992	Succeeded by John Douglas
