= Niall Roberts =

Guyanese swimmer (born 1991)

Personal information
- Born: April 22, 1991 (age 34) Georgetown, Guyana
- Height: 1.78 m (5 ft 10 in)
- Weight: 75 kg (165 lb)

Sport
- Country: Guyana
- Sport: Swimming
- Event: 100m freestyle
- Updated on 22 July 2012

Niall Roberts (born April 22, 1991) is a Guyanese swimmer of Portuguese descent. He competed at the 2008 Summer Olympics. Roberts came 7th in his heat. He also qualified to compete at the 2012 Summer Olympics in London and at the 2013 World Aquatics Championships in Barcelona.

In 2015, Roberts retired from swimming at 23.

Olympic Games
Preceded by Aliann Pompey	Flagbearer for Guyana; Beijing 2008	Succeeded by Winston George
