= Alfred Thomas (boxer) =

Guyanese boxer

Personal information
- Nationality: Guyanese
- Born: 4 August 1949 (age 76)

Sport
- Sport: Boxing
Medal record
Men's amateur boxing
Representing Guyana
Pan American Games
Bronze medal – third place	1979 San Juan	Middleweight

Alfred Thomas (born 4 August 1949) is a former Guyanese boxer. He competed in the men's middleweight event at the 1980 Summer Olympics. At the 1980 Summer Olympics, he lost to Valentin Silaghi of Romania. Thomas won a bronze medal in the middleweight class at the 1979 Pan American Games.

Olympic Games
Preceded by Earl Haley	Flagbearer for Guyana; Seoul 1988	Succeeded by Aubrey Richmond
