= Earl Haley =

Guyanese athlete

Personal information
- Nationality: Guyanese
- Born: 19 May 1959 (age 67)

Sport
- Sport: Sprinting
- Event: 100 metres

Earl Haley (born 19 May 1959) is a Guyanese sprinter. He competed in the men's 100 metres at the 1984 Summer Olympics.

Olympic Games
Preceded by James Gilkes	Flagbearer for Guyana; Los Angeles 1984	Succeeded by Alfred Thomas
