= Chelsea Edghill =

Guyanese table tennis player (born 1997)

Chelsea Edghill OLY
Personal information
- Full name: Chelsea Aretha Renee Edghill
- Nationality: Guyanese
- Born: July 6, 1997 (age 29) Brooklyn, New York, U.S.
- Height: 177 cm (5 ft 10 in)
- Weight: 62 kg (137 lb)

Sport
- Country: Guyana
- Sport: Table tennis
- Event: Singles Event
- Club: Malteenoes Sports Club (Guyana); Lusitania de Lourosa (Portugal)
- Coached by: Idi Lewis

Chelsea Edghill OLY (born July 6, 1997) is a Guyanese table tennis player who has competed at the Commonwealth Games and became the first player from Guyana to compete at the Olympic Games in Table Tennis.

== Career ==
Edghill competes in the women's singles, women's doubles, mixed doubles, and team table tennis events, and is ranked #408 as an individual. In the 2014 Youth Olympic Games she placed 25th in the women's singles; in the 2018 Latin American Table Tennis Championships she went out in the preliminary round, and made it to the first round of the 2019 Pan American Games. In 2018 she was the Caribbean Senior Championships Under 21 champion. As a team athlete, she competed at the 2014 Glasgow Commonwealth Games.

In 2021, she became the first Guyanese Olympic table tennis competitor with her appearance at the 2020 Tokyo Olympics, being entered as a wild card, the only female tennis player to do so. She was also one of the nation's flagbearers during the opening ceremony. After defeating her opponent in the preliminary round, she was knocked out in the first round.

She resides in Aveiro, Portugal, and at the club level competes with Lusitania de Lourosa in Santa Maria da Feira.

== Personal life ==
Edghill grew up in Georgetown, Guyana where she was raised with her two siblings. Edghill's brother Kyle has also competed for Guyana in table tennis, and their mother has managed the Guyanese youth table tennis team. She attended Lindenwood University in St. Charles, Missouri. She graduated in 2019 with a Bachelor's of Science in chemistry.

Olympic Games
Preceded by Hannibal Gaskin	Flagbearer for Guyana (with Andrew Fowler); Tokyo 2020	Succeeded by Incumbent
