= Winston George =

Guyanese sprinter (born 1987)

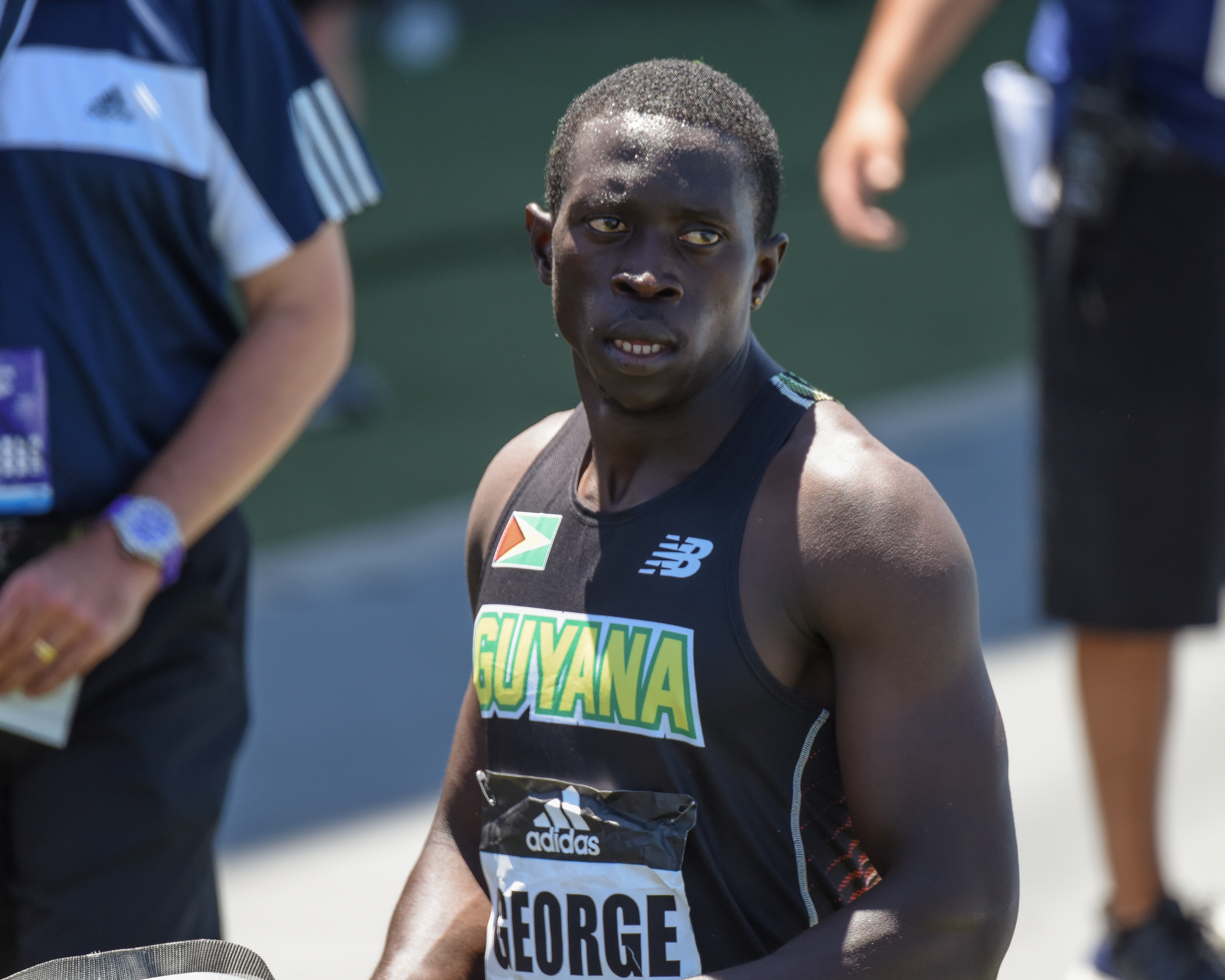

Personal information
- Born: 19 May 1987 (age 39) Georgetown, Guyana
- Height: 1.67 m (5 ft 6 in)
- Weight: 52 kg (115 lb)

Sport
- Country: Guyana
- Sport: Athletics
- Event: 400m
- Updated on 27 June 2013

Winston George (born 19 May 1987) is a Guyanese sprinter. He competed in the 400 m event at the 2012 Summer Olympics. He was the flag bearer of Guyana during the 2012 Summer Olympics opening ceremony. He was also named Guyana's Male Athlete of the Year in 2011 and 2013 by the Athletics Association of Guyana.

== Personal bests ==
- 200 m: 20.53 s (wind: +2.0 m/s) – Clermont, United States, 14 May 2016
- 400 m: 45.25 s – Beijing, China, 23 August 2015

== International competitions ==
Year	Competition	Venue	Position	Event	Notes
Representing Guyana
2011	ALBA Games	Barquisimeto, Venezuela	3rd	200 m	20.84 s w (+2.4 m/s)
2011	ALBA Games	Barquisimeto, Venezuela	2nd	400 m	45.86 s
2011	ALBA Games	Barquisimeto, Venezuela	2nd	4 × 100 m relay	40.07 s
2011	ALBA Games	Barquisimeto, Venezuela	3rd	4 × 400 m relay	3:10.49 min
2011	Pan American Games	Guadalajara, Mexico	7th (h)	200 m	24.17 s A (+0.6 m/s)
2011	Pan American Games	Guadalajara, Mexico	4th (h)	400 m	46.93 s A
2012	Olympic Games	London, United Kingdom	5th (h)	400 m	46.86 s
2013	Central American and Caribbean Championships	Morelia, Mexico	7th	200 m	20.67 A (+0.5 m/s)
2013	Central American and Caribbean Championships	Morelia, Mexico	9th (h)	400 m	46.94 A
2013	World Championships	Moscow, Russia	30th (h)	200 m	20.88 (+0.2 m/s)
2013	Islamic Solidarity Games	Palembang, Indonesia	2nd	200 m	20.77
2013	Islamic Solidarity Games	Palembang, Indonesia	2nd	400 m	46.10
2014	South American Games	Santiago, Chile	5th	200 m	20.77 (-1.0 m/s)
2014	South American Games	Santiago, Chile	4th	400 m	46.15
2014	Commonwealth Games	Glasgow, United Kingdom	5th (sf)	200 m	20.88 (+0.3 m/s)
2014	Commonwealth Games	Glasgow, United Kingdom	4th (sf)	400 m	46.38
2014	Commonwealth Games	Glasgow, United Kingdom	—	4 × 100 m relay	DQ
2014	Central American and Caribbean Games	Xalapa, Mexico	—	200 m	DNF
2014	Central American and Caribbean Games	Xalapa, Mexico	5th	400 m	46.33 A
2014	Central American and Caribbean Games	Xalapa, Mexico	5th	4 × 100 m relay	39.74 A
2015	World Championships	Beijing, China	25th (h)	400 m	45.25
2016	Olympic Games	Rio de Janeiro, Brazil	26th (h)	400 m	45.77
2017	Islamic Solidarity Games	Baku, Azerbaijan	3rd	200 m	20.62
2017	Islamic Solidarity Games	Baku, Azerbaijan	2nd	400 m	45.69
2017	South American Championships	Asunción, Paraguay	1st	400 m	45.42
2017	World Championships	London, United Kingdom	22nd (sf)	200 m	20.74
2017	World Championships	London, United Kingdom	35th (h)	400 m	46.02
2018	Commonwealth Games	Gold Coast, Australia	28th (h)	200 m	21.19
2018	Commonwealth Games	Gold Coast, Australia	20th (sf)	400 m	47.25
2018	South American Games	Cochabamba, Bolivia	5th	200 m	20.55
2018	South American Games	Cochabamba, Bolivia	3rd	400 m	45.67
2018	Central American and Caribbean Games	Barranquilla, Colombia	6th (h)	200 m	20.46^{1}
2018	Central American and Caribbean Games	Barranquilla, Colombia	9th (sf)	400 m	46.77
2019	South American Championships	Lima, Peru	4th	200 m	20.99
2019	South American Championships	Lima, Peru	6th	400 m	47.66

^{1}Disqualified in the semifinals

Olympic Games
Preceded by Niall Roberts	Flagbearer for Guyana; London 2012	Succeeded by Hannibal Gaskin
