= Emanuel Archibald =

Guyanese athlete (born 1994)

Personal information
- Nationality: Guyanese
- Born: 9 September 1994 (age 31) Georgetown, Guyana

Sport
- Sport: Athletics
- Events: 100 metres; 200 metres; Long jump
Medal record
Men's athletics
Representing Guyana
Pan American Games
Bronze medal – third place	2023 Santiago	100 m
South American Championships
Silver medal – second place	2021 Guayaquil	100 m
Bronze medal – third place	2021 Guayaquil	4 × 100 m relay
Central American and Caribbean Games
Gold medal – first place	2023 San Salvador	100 m

Emanuel Archibald (born 9 September 1994) is a Guyanese sprinter and long jumper.

In the long jump, he finished 8th at the 2017 Islamic Solidarity Games and 4th at the 2018 Central American and Caribbean Games.

In the 100 metres, he reached the semi-final at the 2018 Central American and Caribbean Games and the 2018 Commonwealth Games and finished 5th at the 2019 South American Championships.

His personal best 100 m time is 10.13 seconds, achieved in August 2023 in Budapest. His personal best jump is 8.12 metres, achieved in May 2019 in Kingston. This is the Guyanese record.

In 2019, he competed in the men's long jump at the 2019 World Athletics Championships held in Doha, Qatar. He did not qualify to compete in the final.

He qualified to represent Guyana at the 2020 Summer Olympics.

Olympic Games
Preceded by Chelsea Edghill; Andrew Fowler	Flag bearer for Guyana; Paris 2024 with Chelsea Edghill	Succeeded by Incumbent
