= Aliann Pompey =

Guyanese sprinter

Aliann Pompey OLY
Personal information
- Full name: Aliann Tabitha Omalara Pompey
- Born: 9 March 1978 (age 48)
- Height: 1.68 m (5 ft 6 in)
- Weight: 55 kg (121 lb)

Sport
- Country: Guyana
- Sport: Athletics
- Event: 400 metres
Medal record
Women's athletics
Representing Guyana
Commonwealth Games
| Gold medal – first place | 2002 Manchester | 400 m |
| Silver medal – second place | 2010 New Delhi | 400 m |
Pan American Games
| Bronze medal – third place | 2003 Santo Domingo | 400 m |
Central American and Caribbean Games
| Silver medal – second place | 2010 Mayaguez | 400 m |
- Updated on 20 September 2012

Aliann Tabitha Omalara Pompey (born 9 March 1978) is a Guyanese sprinter who specializes in the 400 metres. She has represented Guyana at the Summer Olympics on four separate occasions (2000, 2004, 2008 and 2012). She has competed at the World Championships in Athletics eleven times.

Pompey won the gold medal at the 2002 Commonwealth Games and also won a bronze medal at the 2003 Pan American Games. She holds the South American indoor record for the 400 m. She participated at the World Championships in Athletics in 2001, 2003, 2005, 2007, 2009 and 2011 as well as the IAAF World Indoor Championships in 2001, 2003 2004, 2006 and 2010 and the Summer Olympics in 2000, 2004 and 2008 and 2012 without reaching the final. Her personal best time is 50.71 seconds, achieved in August 2009 at the World Championships in Berlin.

Born in Georgetown, Guyana, she moved to the United States at the age of 14 and graduated from Cohoes High School, and then Manhattan College in The Bronx, New York City. Initially uninterested in track and field, she began to take running seriously in 1995, quickly reducing her 400 metres best time to 53 seconds and winning the state championships. She won the 400 m at the 2000 NCAA Women's Indoor Track and Field Championship, becoming the Manhattan Jaspers' first ever female national champion. She received her bachelor's degree from Manhattan College in 1999.

== Personal bests ==
| Event | Time (sec) | Venue | Date |
|---|---|---|---|
| 200 metres | 23.33 | Patras, Greece | 12 July 2004 |
| 400 metres | 50.71 | Berlin, Germany | 16 August 2009 |
| 400 metres (indoor) | 51.83 | New York City, United States | 26 February 2010 |

- All information taken from IAAF profile.

== Competition record ==
| Year | Competition | Venue | Position | Event | Notes |
Representing Guyana
| 1999 | Pan American Games | Winnipeg, Canada | 4th (h) | 400 m | 52.65 |
| 2000 | Olympic Games | Sydney, Australia | 31st (qf) | 400 m | 53.42 |
| 2001 | World Indoor Championships | Lisbon, Portugal | 10th (sf) | 400 m | 53.18 |
| 2001 | World Championships | Edmonton, Canada | 20th (h) | 400 m | 51.96 |
| 2002 | Commonwealth Games | Manchester, United Kingdom | 1st | 400 m | 51.63 |
| 2003 | World Indoor Championships | Birmingham, United Kingdom | 8th (sf) | 400 m | 52.74 |
| 2003 | Pan American Games | Santo Domingo, Dominican Republic | 3rd | 400 m | 52.06 |
| 2003 | World Championships | Paris, France | 25th (h) | 400 m | 52.21 |
| 2004 | Olympic Games | Athens, Greece | 17th (sf) | 400 m | 51.61 |
| 2005 | Central American and Caribbean Championships | Nassau, Bahamas | 4th | 400 m | 52.21 |
| 2005 | World Championships | Helsinki, Finland | 37th (h) | 400 m | 53.12 |
| 2006 | World Indoor Championships | Moscow, Russia | 16th (h) | 400 m | 53.72 |
| 2006 | Commonwealth Games | Melbourne, Australia | 21st (h) | 400 m | 53.76 |
| 2006 | Central American and Caribbean Games | Cartagena, Colombia | 8th | 400 m | 54.11 |
| 2007 | Pan American Games | Rio de Janeiro, Brazil | 13th (h) | 400 m | 53.03 |
| 2007 | World Championships | Osaka, Japan | 23rd (sf) | 400 m | 53.58 |
| 2008 | Central American and Caribbean Championships | Cali, Colombia | 7th (h) | 400 m | 52.08 |
| 2008 | Olympic Games | Beijing, China | 11th (sf) | 400 m | 50.93 |
| 2009 | World Championships | Berlin, Germany | 11th (sf) | 400 m | 50.71 |
| 2010 | World Indoor Championships | Doha, Qatar | 5th | 400 m | 52.75 |
| 2010 | Central American and Caribbean Games | Mayagüez, Puerto Rico | 6th | 200 m | 24.27 |
| 2010 | Central American and Caribbean Games | Mayagüez, Puerto Rico | 2nd | 400 m | 52.33 |
| 2010 | Commonwealth Games | New Delhi, India | 2nd | 400 m | 51.65 |
| 2011 | Central American and Caribbean Championships | Mayagüez, Puerto Rico | 4th | 400 m | 52.02 |
| 2011 | World Championships | Daegu, South Korea | 25th (h) | 400 m | 53.59 |
| 2012 | World Indoor Championships | Istanbul, Turkey | 18th (h) | 400 m | 54.63 |
| 2012 | Olympic Games | London, United Kingdom | 21st (sf) | 400 m | 52.58 |

Olympic Games
| Preceded by John Douglas | Flagbearer for Guyana; Sydney 2000; Athens 2004 | Succeeded by Niall Roberts |
