= Guyana Olympic Association =

National Olympic Committee

- Country: Guyana
- Code: GUY
- Created: 1935
- Recognized: 1948
- Continental Association: PASO
- President: Mr. Godfrey Munroe
- Secretary General: Mrs. Vidushi Persaud-McKinnon

The Guyana Olympic Association (IOC code: GUY) is the National Olympic Committee representing Guyana.

== See also ==
- Guyana at the Olympics
- Guyana at the Commonwealth Games
