= Lillie Nordmann =

American swimmer (born 2002)

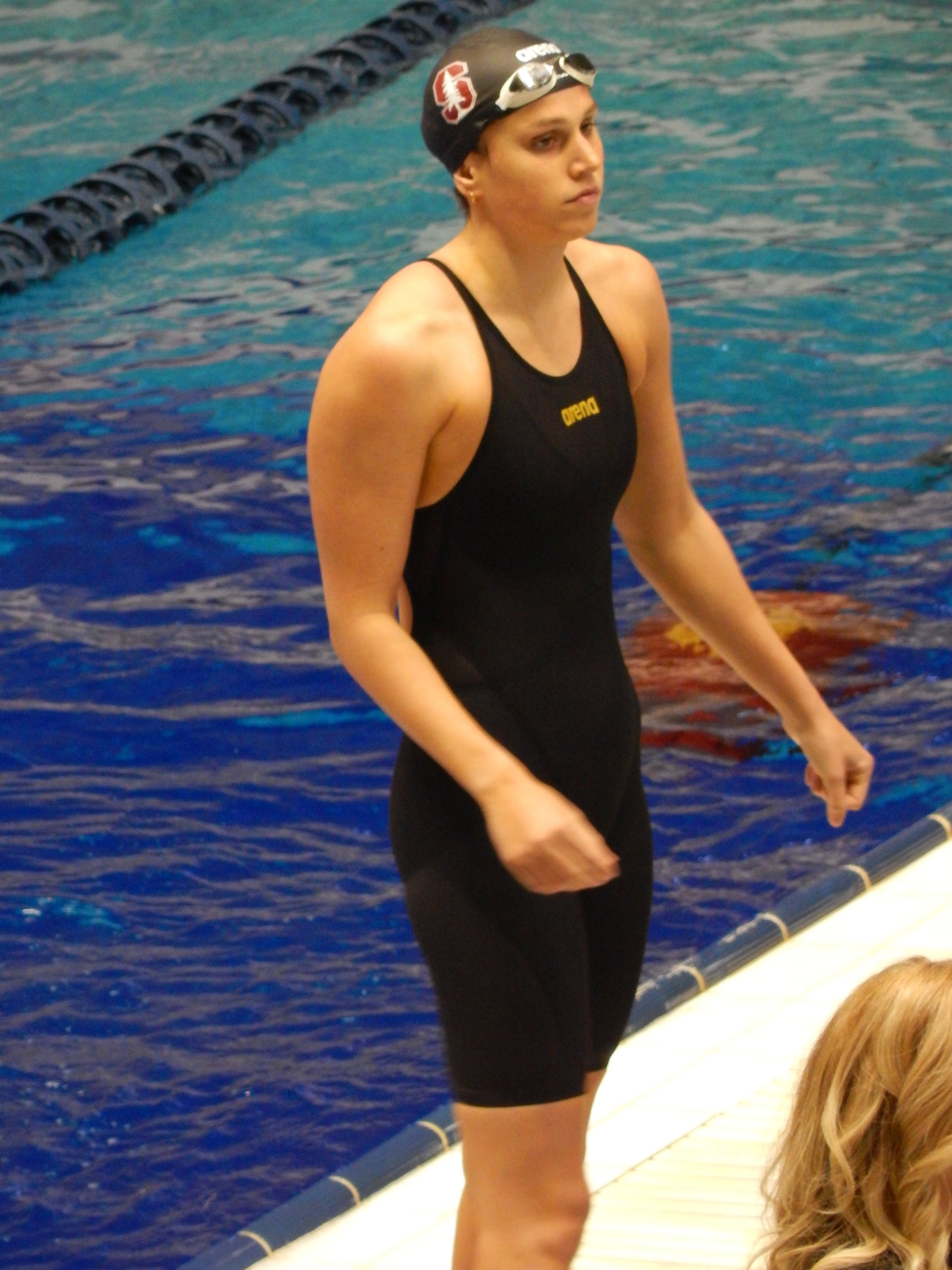
- Nordmann in 2023

Personal information
- National team: United States
- Born: August 5, 2002 (age 23) United States
- Height: 6 ft 0 in (183 cm)

Sport
- Sport: Swimming
- Strokes: Butterfly, freestyle
- Club: Alto Swim Club; Magnolia Aquatics (former)
- College team: Stanford University
Medal record
Women's swimming
Representing United States
Event	1st	2nd	3rd
World Junior Championships	3	0	0
Total	3	0	0
World Junior Championships
Gold medal – first place	2019 Budapest	200 m butterfly
Gold medal – first place	2019 Budapest	4×200 m freestyle
Gold medal – first place	2019 Budapest	4×100 m medley
Representing the Stanford Cardinal
Event	1st	2nd	3rd
NCAA Championships	0	2	0
Total	0	2	0
By race
Event	1st	2nd	3rd
4×100 y freestyle	0	2	0
Total	0	2	0
NCAA Championships
Silver medal – second place	2022 Atlanta	4×100 y freestyle
Silver medal – second place	2023 Knoxville	4×200 y freestyle

Lillie Nordmann (born August 5, 2002) is an American competitive swimmer specializing in butterfly and freestyle events. She competed at the 2019 World Junior Swimming Championships, winning gold medals in the 200 meter butterfly, 4×200 meter freestyle relay, and 4×100 meter medley relay. She competes collegiately for Stanford University.

== Background ==
Nordmann was born August 5, 2002, to Amy and Michael Nordmann. Her mother competed collegiately and won a national title in volleyball and her father competed collegiately in swimming. For club swimming growing up she trained and competed as part of The Woodlands Swim Team and Magnolia Aquatics. She attended The Woodlands High School in The Woodlands, Texas, where she competed as part of the school swim team and won State Championships titles in the 200 yard freestyle and 100 yard butterfly. In 2021, she started attending Stanford University and competing collegiately as part of Stanford Cardinal. She has three sisters; Lucie, Mary and Zoe Nordmann, also swimmers as well.

== Career ==
=== 2013–2018 ===
In 2013, Nordmann won the Swammy Award for female Age Group Swimmer of the Year, 10 years old and younger age group, from SwimSwam for ranking in the top ten nationally in 12 events for her age group. At the 2018 Junior Pan Pacific Swimming Championships in Suva, Fiji, she placed fourth in the 200 meter butterfly, first in the b-final of the 4×100 meter freestyle relay and the 100 meter butterfly, 20th in the 100 meter freestyle, and 21st in the 50 meter freestyle.

=== 2019 ===
In the summer of 2019, Nordmann committed to swimming for Stanford University starting in the autumn of 2020. Approximately one month later, she won the silver medal in the 200 meter butterfly at the 2019 US National Championships in Stanford, California with a personal best time of 2:07.42, finishing 0.17 seconds behind the first-place finisher in the event Regan Smith. In the prelims heats of the 200 meter freestyle, Nordmann tied for 45th with a 2:02.17. For the 100 meter butterfly, she swam a personal best time of 57.96 seconds to place sixth in the final. She placed seventh in the d-final of the 50 meter freestyle with a 26.00.

==== 2019 World Junior Championships ====
2019 World Junior Championships
Gold medal – first place	200 m butterfly	2:08.24
Gold medal – first place	4×200 m freestyle	7:55.49
Gold medal – first place	4×100 m medley	3:59.13 (h)

Nordmann was named as one of the five captains for the contingent of swimmers to represent the United States at the 2019 World Junior Championships, held at Danube Arena in Budapest, Hungary. On the first day of competition, she split a 1:59.97 for the lead-off leg of the 4×200 meter freestyle relay in the prelims heats to help qualify the relay to the final ranking first with a time of 8:01.10. In the final, later the same day, Nordmann split a 1:59.31 for the first leg of the relay to contribute to the gold medal-winning time of 7:55.49. The following day, she won the gold medal in the 200 meter butterfly with a time of 2:08.42, finishing over half a second ahead of the silver medalist in the event, Blanka Berecz of Hungary. For her third and final event of the Championships Nordmann made it three-for-three, winning her third gold medal, out of a possible three gold medals, in the 4×100 meter medley relay on which she contributed a split of 57.76 for the butterfly leg of the relay in the prelims heats before Torri Huske substituted in for her on the finals relay.

=== 2020 ===
While Nordmann had originally committed to starting at Stanford University in the autumn of 2020, she decided to defer her enrollment one year to 2021 due to the COVID-19 pandemic. The announcement of her decision ranked as the number five item on "The Week That Was" honor by Swimming World for the week of August 17, 2020. Once she graduated from high school in the spring of 2020, she moved to and commenced training in California in anticipation of starting at Stanford University the following year.

=== 2020 US Olympic Trials ===
At the 2020 US Olympic Trials in Omaha, Nebraska in June 2021, Nordmann placed 13th in the semifinals of the 100 meter butterfly with a 58.54. In the prelims heats of the 200 meter freestyle she swam a 2:00.76, placed 24th overall, and did not advance to the semifinals. For the 200 meter butterfly, she placed 14th in the semifinals in 2:11.14. In her fourth event, the 100 meter freestyle, she finished in a time of 55.99 seconds to place 31st overall. Nordmann tied for 54th in her fifth and final event, the 50 meter freestyle, with a time of 26.21 seconds.

=== 2021–2022: First collegiate season ===
Starting off her collegiate career at Stanford University in the autumn of 2021, Nordmann was bestowed with the Stanford Cardinal women's swim and dive kickboard, a symbol of the spirit of the swim team that had formerly been in the possession of swimmers on the school team including Janet Evans and Katie Ledecky. At the 2021 North Carolina State Invitational in November, Nordmann placed second in the 200 yard butterfly with a 1:54.43.

==== 2022 Pac-12 Championships ====
On the second day of the 2022 Pac-12 Conference Championships, held in February at the King County Aquatic Center in Federal Way, Washington, Nordmann ranked 13th in the prelims heats of the 500 yard freestyle with a 4:47.13. She placed tenth overall in the finals heats. Day three of competition, she was the only freshman or sophomore to rank in the top eight in the prelims heats of the 200 yard freestyle, swimming a 1:45.69 to qualify for the final ranking sixth. In the final, she placed sixth with a time of 1:44.85 and was one of six swimmers to finish in less than 1:45.00. For her final individual event, the 200 yard butterfly on day four, she qualified for the final of the event ranking third with a 1:55.14 in the prelims heats. In the final she achieved a top-three finish for the first time in the Championships, placing third with a time of 1:53.92.

==== 2022 NCAA Championships ====
2022 NCAA Championships
Silver medal – second place	4×100 yd freestyle	3:08.97

On the second day of the 2022 NCAA Championships in Atlanta in March, Nordmann placed 31st in the prelims heats of the 500 yard freestyle with a 4:44.35. In the morning of day three, she swam a 1:43.02 in the prelims heats of the 200 yard freestyle and qualified for the final ranking sixth. She followed her prelims swim up with another personal best time in the final, finishing fourth with a time of 1:42.63. In the prelims heats of the 200 yard butterfly on the fourth and final day, she tied for ninth with a time of 1:53.63 and qualified for the b-final. She swam a personal best time of 1:53.20 to win the b-final in the evening. In her final event of the Championships, Nordmann earned her first podium finish (first, second, or third-place), helping place second in the 4×100 yard freestyle relay with a split of 47.71 seconds for the second leg of the relay.

=== 2022 U.S. Open Championships ===
In her first event of the 2022 U.S. Open Swimming Championships, the 50 meter freestyle on day two, Nordmann placed second in the c-final with a time of 25.99 seconds. The following morning, she ranked fifth in the preliminary heats of the 200 meter freestyle with a 2:00.81 and qualified for the final. For the evening final, she improved her time to a 2:00.29 to finish fourth, 2.13 seconds behind silver medalist Erin Gemmell and 0.53 seconds behind bronze medalist Addison Sauickie. On the final day of competition, she swam a time of 55.47 seconds in the final of the 100 meter freestyle, placing fourth.

=== 2022–2023: Second collegiate season ===
At the 2022 NC State GAC Fall Invitational in Greensboro, North Carolina, Nordmann placed third in the 100 yard freestyle with a personal best time of 48.45 seconds.

==== 2023 Pac-12 Championships ====
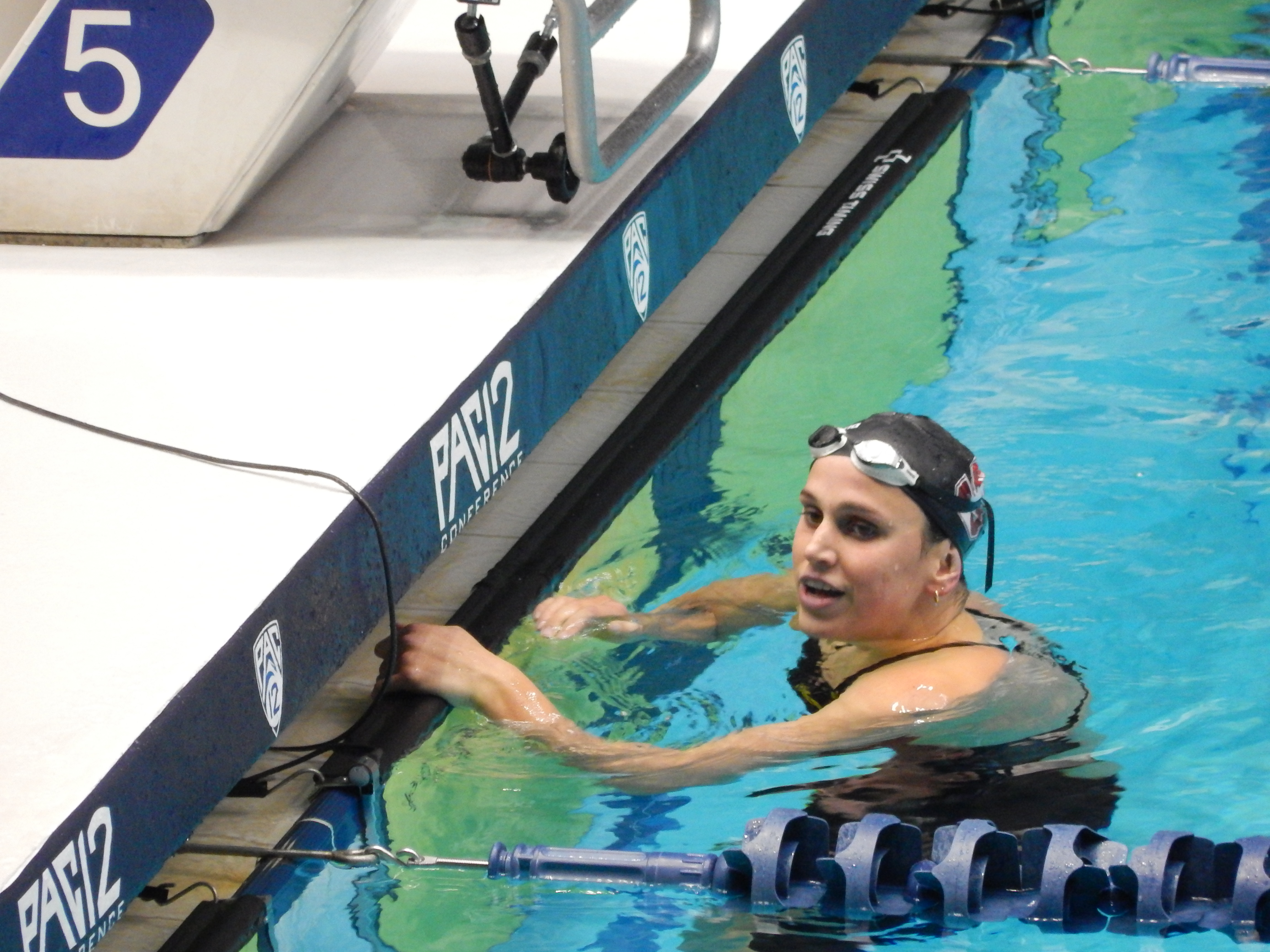
Nordmann in the 200 yard freestyle preliminaries

For the 2023 Pac-12 Conference Championships, held in February at the same venue as the year before in Federal Way, Washington, Nordmann commenced competing on day one, earning her first conference title of her collegiate career in the 4×200 yard freestyle relay, where she swam a 1:44.22 for the third leg of the relay to help finish first in 6:53.90. It was the fastest time in the women's event in the NCAA season. On day two, she placed fourteenth overall, sixth in the b-final, of the 500 yard freestyle, finishing in a time of 4:44.21. For the 200 yard freestyle on day three, she advanced to the final with a time of 1:45.37 and overall rank of eighth, achieving her time from lane 5 in the seventh of seven preliminary heats, before placing sixth in the evening final with a time of 1:45.65. In her final individual event of the Championships, the 200 yard butterfly on day four of four, she finished within 1.22 seconds of gold medalist Lindsay Looney in the final to place fourth with a time of 1:53.89, which was less than four-tenths of a second behind the bronze medalist. Her placings in individual and relay events contributed to an overall team conference title win for Stanford Cardinal.

==== 2023 NCAA Championships ====
The first day of the 2023 NCAA Division I Championships, Nordmann won a silver medal in the 4×200 yard freestyle relay, contributing a time of 1:44.04 for the third leg of the relay to the final time of 6:50.77 and marking her first medal in the event at an NCAA Championships. On the following morning, she placed sixty-third in the 500 yard freestyle, finishing in a time of 4:47.44. The third morning, she achieved a time of 1:44.53 in the preliminaries of the 200 yard freestyle and placed seventeenth overall. She finished first in the consolation final (b-final) of the 200 yard butterfly on the fourth and final day with a time of 1:53.90.

== International championships ==
Meet	50 freestyle	100 freestyle	200 freestyle	400m/500yd freestyle	100 butterfly	200 butterfly	4×100 freestyle	4×200 freestyle	4×100 medley
PACJ 2018	21st	20th			1st (b)	4th	1st (b)		
WJC 2019						1st place, gold medalist(s)		1st place, gold medalist(s)	(gold) ^{[a]}
NCAA 2022			4th	31st		1st (b)	2nd place, silver medalist(s)		
NCAA 2023			17th	63rd		1st (b)		2nd place, silver medalist(s)	

^{a} Nordmann swam only in the prelims heats.

== Personal best times ==
=== Long course meters (50 m pool) ===
Event	Time		Meet	Location	Date	Ref
100 m freestyle	54.57		2022 US National Championships	Irvine, California	July 26, 2022	
200 m freestyle	1:59.31	r	2019 World Junior Championships	Budapest, Hungary	August 20, 2019	
100 m butterfly	57.96		2019 US National Championships	Stanford, California	August 2, 2019	
200 m butterfly	2:07.43		2019 US National Championships	Stanford, California	July 31, 2019	

Legend: r – relay first leg

=== Short course yards (25 yd pool) ===
Event	Time		Meet	Location	Date	Ref
100 yd freestyle	48.45		2022 NC State GAC Fall Invitational	Greensboro, North Carolina	November 19, 2022	
200 yd freestyle	1:42.63		2022 NCAA Division I Championships	Atlanta, Georgia	March 18, 2022	
500 yd freestyle	4:43.22	b	2022 Pac-12 Conference Championships	Federal Way, Washington	February 24, 2022	
200 yd butterfly	1:53.20		2022 NCAA Division I Championships	Atlanta, Georgia	March 19, 2022	

Legend: h – prelims heat; b – b-final

== Awards and honors ==
- SwimSwam, Swammy Award, Age Group Swimmer of the Year (10 and under): 2013
- Houston Chronicle, All-Greater Houston Swimmer of the Year (Girls): 2020
- VYPE Award, Swimmer of the Year (Girls): 2020
- Swimming World, The Week That Was: August 12, 2020 (#5)
- Stanford University, Women's Swim and Dive Kickboard: 2021
