= Swimming at the 2023 Pan American Games – Women's 4 × 200 metre freestyle relay =

Women's 4 × 200 metre freestyle relay at the 2023 Pan American Games
- Venue: Aquatic Center
- Dates: October 24 (Final)
- Competitors: 55 from 11 nations
- Winning time: 7:55.26

Medalists
Gold medal	Camille Spink; Kayla Wilson; Kelly Pash; Paige Madden; Amy Fulmer; Rachel Stege; Olivia Bray	United States
Silver medal	Maria Fernanda Costa; Nathalia Almeida; Stephanie Balduccini; Gabrielle Roncatto; Maria Paula Heitmann; Giovanna Diamante; Celine Bispo; Maria Luiza Pessanha	Brazil
Bronze medal	Mary-Sophie Harvey; Julie Brousseau; Brooklyn Douthwright; Katerine Savard; Emma O'Croinin; Sydney Pickrem	Canada

The women's 4 × 200 metre freestyle relay competition of the swimming events at the 2023 Pan American Games were held October 24, 2023, at the Aquatic Center in Santiago.

== Records ==
Prior to this competition, the existing world and Pan American Games records were as follows:

World record	Australia (AUS); Mollie O'Callaghan (1:53.66); Shayna Jack (1:55.63); Brianna Throssell (1:55.80); Ariarne Titmus (1:52.41)	7:37.50	Fukuoka, Japan	July 27, 2023
Pan American Games record	United States (USA); Kiera Janzen (1:59.61); Allison Schmitt (1:55.98); Courtney Harnish (1:59.61); Gillian Ryanl (1:59.12)	7:54.32	Toronto, Canada	July 16, 2015

== Results ==
KEY:	Q	Qualified for final	GR	Games record	NR	National record	PB	Personal best	SB	Seasonal best

=== Heats ===
The first round was held on October 24.

Rank	Heat	Lane	Nation	Swimmers	Time	Notes
1	1	4	Canada	Katerine Savard (2:01.00); Brooklyn Douthwright (2:01.02); Emma O'Croinin (2:01.82); Sydney Pickrem (2:02.14)	8:05.98	Q
2	2	4	United States	Amy Fulmer (2:02.10); Rachel Stege (2:02.45); Olivia Bray (2:02.29); Kelly Pash (2:00.56)	8:07.40	Q
3	1	5	Cuba	Laurent Estrada (2:05.22); Andrea Becali (2:02.34); Lorena González (2:06.71); Elisbet Gámez (2:05.50)	8:19.77	Q
4	2	5	Brazil	Maria Paula Heitmann (2:02.19); Giovanna Diamante (2:04.95); Celine Bispo (2:06.87); Maria Luiza Pessanha (2:06.04)	8:20.05	Q
5	2	2	Venezuela	Paola Perez Sierra (2:07.55); Fabiana Pesce (2.09.43); Mariana Cote Dahdah (2:08.62); Maria Yegres (2:05.93)	8:31.53	Q
6	2	3	Mexico	Athena Meneses (2.06.65); Maria Mata Cocco (2.04.58); Susana Hernandez Barradas (2:10.21); Melissa Rodriguez (2:10.27)	8:31.71	Q
7	1	3	Argentina	Agostina Hein (2:05.33); Lucia Gauna (2:09.39); Malena Santillán (2:09.58); Delfina Dini (2:07.58)	8:31.88	Q
8	1	6	Chile	Inés Marín (2:04.68); Sarah Szklaruk Traipe (2:09.42); Mahina Valdivia (2:11.57); Montserrat Spielmann (2:07.93)	8:33.60	Q
9	2	6	Colombia	Karen Durango (2:05.33); Isabella Bedoya (2:13.66); Jazmín Pistelli (2:09.74); Laura Melo (2:12.72)	8:41.45	
10	2	7	Peru	Sophia Ribeiro (2:09.71); María Bramont-Arias (2:12.69); McKenna DeBever (2:08.17); Yasmín Silva (2:13.06)	8:43.63	
11	1	7	Jamaica	Sabrina Lyn (2:18.33); Emily MacDonald (2:11.12); Marie Cogle Morgan; Leanna Wainwright	9:08.37	
	1	2	Independent Athletes Team		DNS	

=== Final ===
The final was also held on October 24.

Rank	Lane	Name	Nationality	Time	Notes
1st place, gold medalist(s)	5	Camille Spink (1:59.38); Kayla Wilson (1:58.76); Kelly Pash (1:58.62); Paige Madden (1:58.50)	United States	7:55.26	
2nd place, silver medalist(s)	6	Maria Fernanda Costa (1:58.39); Nathalia Almeida (1:59.65); Stephanie Balduccini (1:58.40); Gabrielle Roncatto (1:59.41)	Brazil	7:55.85	
3rd place, bronze medalist(s)	4	Mary-Sophie Harvey (1:59.40); Julie Brousseau (1:58.54); Brooklyn Douthwright (1:59.16); Katerine Savard (1:59.88)	Canada	7:56.98	
4	3	Andrea Becali (2:01.95); Lorena González (2:03.68); Laurent Estrada (2:04.00); Elisbet Gámez ( 2:01.40)	Cuba	8:11.03	
5	7	Maria Mata Cocco (2:02.39); Athena Meneses (2:05.35); Susana Hernandez Barradas (2:08.00); Karen Rodriguez (2:07.82)	Mexico	8:23.56	
6	1	Inés Marín (2:03.78); Montserrat Spielmann (2:06.10); Mahina Valdivia (2:10.10); Sarah Szklaruk Traipe (2:06.68)	Chile	8:26.66	NR
7	2	Maria Yegres (2:03.03); Paola Perez Sierra (2:07.58); Mariana Cote Dahdah (2:09.11); Fabiana Pesce (2:11.27)	Venezuela	8:30.99	
8	8	Sophia Ribeiro (2:09.57); María Bramont-Arias (2:15.00); María Fe Muñoz (2:15.40); Yasmín Silva (2:18.41)	Peru	8:58.38	
