= 2026 Pan Pacific Swimming Championships – Men's 200 metre butterfly =

Men's 200 metre butterfly at the 2026 Pan Pacific Swimming Championships
- Venue: William Woollett Jr. Aquatics Center
- Dates: August 12
- Competitors: 14 from 5 nations
- Winning time: 1:53.11 CR

Medalists
gold medal	Luca Urlando	United States
silver medal	Carson Foster	United States
bronze medal	Harrison Turner	Australia

Official Video (heats)

Official Video (B and A final)

The men's 200 metre butterfly event at the 2026 Pan Pacific Swimming Championships was held on August 12 at the William Woollett Jr. Aquatics Center in Irvine, California. The event was won by American Luca Urlando in a championship record time of 1:53.11, breaking the previous record of 1:53.80 set by Michael Phelps at the 2006 championships. His compatriot Carson Foster claimed the silver medal in 1:53.67, equalling his personal best set in July 2022, while Australia's Harrison Turner, the silver medalist in the event at the 2026 Commonwealth Games, won the bronze medal in 1:54.44. China's Chen Juner finished fourth in 1:55.68.

Earlier in the morning heats, Urlando recorded the fastest qualifying time of 1:54.13, ahead of Foster in 1:54.72 and Turner in 1:55.05. American Thomas Heilman recorded the fourth-fastest time overall in 1:55.11 but was restricted to the B final because Urlando and Foster had secured the two available American places in the A final. Their compatriot Dare Rose was similarly restricted to the B final despite finishing seventh overall in 1:57.73. In the evening session, Canada's Aiden Kirk and Australia's Se-Bom Lee withdrew from the B final, leaving four competitors. Heilman won the B final in 1:55.57, a time that would have placed fourth in the A final, while South Africa's Jarden Eaton was disqualified for a false start and Rose was disqualified for a non-simultaneous touch. In the A final, Urlando improved on his morning time by 1.02 seconds to establish the new championship record, while Foster equalled his lifetime best to finish second.

== Records ==
Prior to this competition, the existing records were as follows:

Records before the 2026 Pan Pacific Swimming Championships
Record	Time	Athlete (nation)	Meet	Location	Date	Ref
World record	1:50.34	Kristóf Milák (HUN)	2022 World Championships	Budapest, Hungary	June 21, 2022	
Championship record	1:53.80	Michael Phelps (USA)	2006 Pan Pacs	Victoria, Canada	August 17, 2006	

== Schedule ==
The schedule was as follows:

All times are Pacific Daylight Time (UTC-7)

Date	Time	Round
Wednesday, August 12, 2026	11:20	Heats
Wednesday, August 12, 2026	20:40	Finals

== Results ==
=== Heats ===
The heats were held at 11:20 on August 12, 2026.

Heat results
Rank	Heat	Lane	Swimmer	Nation	Time	Notes
1	2	4	Luca Urlando	United States	1:54.13	QA
2	1	4	Carson Foster	United States	1:54.72	QA
3	1	5	Harrison Turner	Australia	1:55.05	QA
4	2	5	Thomas Heilman	United States	1:55.11	QB
5	1	3	Chen Juner	China	1:56.35	QA
6	2	7	Kris Mihaylov	South Africa	1:57.68	QA
7	2	3	Dare Rose	United States	1:57.73	QB
8	2	6	Benjamin Loewen	Canada	1:58.90	QA
9	2	2	Se-Bom Lee	Australia	1:59.34	QA
10	1	6	Anton Semenyuk	Canada	2:00.22	QA
11	1	7	Aiden Kirk	Canada	2:00.62	QB
12	1	2	Jordi Vilchez	Canada	2:02.95	QB
13	2	1	Kai Whelan	South Africa	2:05.24	QB
14	1	1	Jarden Eaton	South Africa	2:06.28	QB

=== B Final ===
The B final was held at 20:40 on August 12, 2026.

B Final results
Rank	Lane	Swimmer	Nation	Time	Notes
9	4	Thomas Heilman	United States	1:55.57	
10	3	Jordi Vilchez	Canada	1:58.61	
	5	Dare Rose	United States	DSQ	
	6	Jarden Eaton	South Africa	DSQ	

=== A Final ===
The A final was held after the B final on August 12, 2026.

A Final results
Rank	Lane	Swimmer	Nation	Time	Notes
1st place, gold medalist(s)	4	Luca Urlando	United States	1:53.11	CR
2nd place, silver medalist(s)	5	Carson Foster	United States	1:53.67	
3rd place, bronze medalist(s)	3	Harrison Turner	Australia	1:54.44	
4	6	Chen Juner	China	1:55.68	
5	7	Benjamin Loewen	Canada	1:56.26	
6	1	Anton Semenyuk	Canada	1:58.39	
7	2	Kris Mihaylov	South Africa	1:59.53	
8	8	Kai Whelan	South Africa	2:06.54	
