= Swimming at the 2023 Pan American Games – Mixed 4 × 100 metre medley relay =

Mixed 4 × 100 metre medley relay at the 2023 Pan American Games
- Venue: Aquatic Centre
- Date: October 23

Medalists
Gold medal	Kennedy Noble; Jacob Foster; Kelly Pash; Jonathan Kulow; Jack Aikins; Arsenio Bustos; Olivia Bray; Kayla Wilson	United States
Silver medal	Javier Acevedo; Gabe Mastromatteo; Maggie MacNeil; Mary-Sophie Harvey; Blake Tierney; James Dergousoff; Katerine Savard; Brooklyn Douthwright	Canada
Bronze medal	Guilherme Basseto; João Gomes Júnior; Clarissa Rodrigues; Stephanie Balduccini; Gabriel Fantoni; Jhennifer Conceição; Victor Baganha; Giovanna Diamante	Brazil

The mixed 4 × 100 metre medley relay competition of the swimming events at the 2023 Pan American Games were held on October 23, 2023, at the Aquatic Center in Santiago, Chile.

== Records ==
Prior to this competition, the existing world and Pan American Games records were as follows:

World record	Kathleen Dawson (58.80); Adam Peaty (56.78); James Guy (50.00); Anna Hopkin (52.00) (GBR)	3:37.58	Tokyo, Japan	July 31, 2021
Pan American Games record	Kennedy Noble (59.72); Jacob Foster (1:00.09); Kelly Pash (57.51); Jonny Kulow (47.39) (USA)	3:48.27	Lima, Peru	August 8, 2019

== Results ==
KEY:	QA	Qualified for A final	QB	Qualified for B final	GR	Games record	NR	National record	PB	Personal best	SB	Seasonal best

=== Heats ===
The highest eight scores advance to the final.

Rank	Heat	Lane	Name	Nationality	Time	Notes
1	2	4	Jack Aikins (54.09); Arsenio Bustos (1:02.69); Olivia Bray (59.48); Kayla Wilson (55.49)	United States	3:51.75	Q
2	1	4	Blake Tierney (55.92); James Dergousoff (1:01.87); Katerine Savard (59.95); Brooklyn Douthwright (55.65)	Canada	3:53.39	Q
3	2	5	Gabriel Fantoni (55.83); Jhennifer Conceição (1:09.72); Victor Baganha (53.06); Giovanna Diamante (57.11)	Brazil	3:55.72	Q
4	2	3	Anthony Rincón (56.83); Juan García (1:03.77); Valentina Becerra (1:00.13); Karen Durango (57.73)	Colombia	3:58.46	Q
5	1	5	Maximiliano Vega (57.14); Carlos Kossio (1:04.06); Miriam Guevara; Susana Hernández	Mexico	4:01.13	Q
6	1	3	Agustín Hernández (57.67); Julia Sebastián; Federico Ludueña; Madgalena Portela (58.61)	Argentina	4:02.60	Q
7	1	7	Carolina Cermelli (1:06.56); Emily Santos (1:10.30); Jeancarlo Calderón (56.02); Isaac Beitia (51.19)	Panama	4:04.07	Q
8	2	6	Jesús López (1:00.48); Eric Veit (1:03.59); Lismar Lyon (1:01.68); Fabiana Pesce (58.81)	Venezuela	4:04.56	Q
9	1	1	Manuel Osorio (57.94); Maximiliano Cereceda (1:04.38); Monstserrat Spielmann (1:01.78); Mahina Valdivia (1:02.15)	Chile	4:06.25	R
10	1	6	Carlos Cobos (58.99); McKenna DeBever (1:11.26); Alexia Sotomayor (1:02.51); Ricardo Espinosa (53.56)	Peru	4:10.32	R
11	2	1	Katelyn Cabral (1:09.70); Mark-Anthony Thompson (1:06.46); Emmanuel Gadson (56.14); Ariel Weech (1:00.50)	Bahamas	4:12.80	
12	2	2	Sidrell Williams (1:05.34); Kito Campbell (1:06.52); Sabrina Lyn (1:04.08); Emily MacDonald (58.51)	Jamaica	4:14.45	
13	2	7	Miguel Turcios (1:01.92); Nicole Mack; Christopher Gossmann; Melissa Diego (1:01.46)	Independent Athletes Team	4:!9.38	
	2	8		Uruguay	DNS	
	1	2		Dominican Republic	DNS	

=== Final ===
The final was held on October 23.

Rank	Lane	Name	Nationality	Time	Notes
1st place, gold medalist(s)	4	Kennedy Noble (59.72); Jacob Foster (1:00.09); Kelly Pash (57.51); Jonathan Kulow (47.39)	United States	3:44.71	PR
2nd place, silver medalist(s)	5	Javier Acevedo (54.45); Gabe Mastromatteo (1:00.78); Maggie MacNeil (56.67); Mary-Sophie Harvey (54.30)	Canada	3:46.20	
3rd place, bronze medalist(s)	3	Guilherme Basseto (55.67); João Gomes Júnior (1:00.47); Clarissa Rodrigues; Stephanie Balduccini	Brazil	3:49.24	
4	6	Omar Pinzón (55.47); Jorge Murillo (1:00.24); Valentina Becerra (59.28); Sirena Rowe (55.44)	Colombia	3:50.43	
5	7	Ulises Saravia (54.87); Macarena Ceballos (1:07.47); Joaquín Piñero (53.90); Lucía Gauna (56.60)	Argentina	3:52.84	
6	2	Miranda Grana (1:03.06); Miguel de Lara (1:00.48); Angel Martínez (54.20); Athena Meneses (56.63)	Mexico	3:54.37	
7	8	Carla González (1:02.95); Mercedes Toledo (1:09.45); Jorge Otaiza (52.98); Emil Pérez (51.28)	Venezuela	3:56.66	
8	1	Carolina Cermelli (1:05.78); Emily Santos (1:09.70); Jeancarlo Calderón (55.62); Isaac Beitia (51.98)	Panama	4:03.08	
