= Swimming at the 2023 Pan American Games – Women's 4 × 100 metre freestyle relay =

Women's 4 × 100 metre freestyle relay at the 2023 Pan American Games
- Venue: Aquatic Centre
- Date: October 21
- Competitors: 75 from 15 nations

Medalists
Gold medal	Katerine Savard; Mary-Sophie Harvey; Brooklyn Douthwright; Emma O'Croinin; Julie Brousseau; Brooklyn Douthwright; Maggie Macneil	Canada
Silver medal	Reilly Tiltmann; Camille Spink; Kayla Wilson; Olivia Bray; Gabi Albiero; Catie De Loof; Amy Fulmer	United States
Bronze medal	Stephanie Balduccini; Ana Vieira; Celine Bispo; Cristina Versiani; Giovanna Diamante	Brazil

The women's 4 × 100 metre freestyle relay competition of the swimming events at the 2023 Pan American Games were held on October 21, 2023, at the Aquatic Center in Santiago, Chile.

== Records ==
Prior to this competition, the existing world and Pan American Games records were as follows:

World record	Australia (AUS); Mollie O'Callaghan (52.08); Shayna Jack (51.69); Meg Harris (52.29); Emma McKeon (51.90)	3:27.96	Fukuoka, Japan	July 23, 2023
Pan American Games record	Canada (CAN); Sandrine Mainville (54.43); Michelle Williams (54.42); Katerine Savard (54.53); Chantal van Landeghem (53.42)	3:36.80	Toronto, Canada	July 14, 2015

== Results ==
KEY:	QA	Qualified for A final	QB	Qualified for B final	GR	Games record	NR	National record	PB	Personal best	SB	Seasonal best

=== Heats ===
The highest eight scores advance to the final.

Rank	Heat	Lane	Name	Nationality	Time	Notes
1	2	5	Stephanie Balduccini (55.61); Ana Vieira (54.63); Celine Bispo (55.90); Lorrane Ferreira (56.60)	Brazil	3:42.74	Q
2	2	4	Reilly Tiltmann (56.12); Camille Spink (55.49); Kayla Wilson (55.30); Olivia Bray (55.96)	United States	3:42.47	Q
3	1	4	Katerine Savard (55.70); Brooklyn Douthwright (55.50); Emma O'Croinin (55.67); Julie Brousseau (56.21)	Canada	3:43.08	Q
4	2	3	Laurent Estrada (56.91); Andrea Becali (56.63); Lorena González (57.19); Elisbet Gámez (55.90)	Cuba	3:46.63	Q
5	1	3	Sirena Rowe (56.93); Valentina Becerra (58.05); Isabella Bedoya (57.25); Isabella Arcila (56.40)	Colombia	3:48.63	Q
6	2	6	Guillermina Ruggiero (57.14); Florencia Perotti (57.76); Andrea Berrino (56.88); Lucía Gauna (57.24)	Argentina	3:49.02	Q
7	1	5	Sofía Revilak (57.12); Andrea Sansores (57.19); Susana Hernandez (57.84); Miranda Grana (57.54)	Mexico	3:49.69	Q
8	2	2	Carla Gonzalez (56.60); María Yegres (57.61); Fabiana Pesce (58.14); Mercedes Toledo (58.03)	Venezuela	3:50.28	Q
9	1	6	McKenna DeBever (57.16); Rafaela Fernandini (57.57); Sophia Ribeiro (59.26); Alexia Sotomayor (58.78)	Peru	3:52.77	R
10	2	7	Abril Aunchayna (59.29); María Solari (58.92); Nicole Frank (59.70); Luna Chabat (57.73)	Uruguay	3:55.64	R
11	1	2	Emily Macdonald (57.74); Morgan Cogle (1:02.42); Leanna Wainwright (1:01.60); Sabrina Lyn (59.97)	Jamaica	4:01.73	
12	1	7	María Santis (59.64); María Morales (59.80); Melissa Diego (1:01.69); Lucero Mejia (1:01.59)	Independent Athletes Team	4:02.72	
13	2	1	Zaylie Thompson (59.60); Katelyn Cabral (1:02.71); Ariel Weech (1:02.57); Victoria Russell (1:03.96)	Bahamas	4:08.84	

=== Final ===
The final was held on October 21.

Rank	Lane	Name	Nationality	Time	Notes
1st place, gold medalist(s)	3	Mary-Sophie Harvey (54.69); Brooklyn Douthwright (54.99); Maggie Macneil (53.14); Katerine Savard (54.93)	Canada	3:37.75	
2nd place, silver medalist(s)	5	Gabi Albiero (55.02); Catie De Loof (54.19); Kayla Wilson (54.85); Amy Fulmer ()54.36	United States	3:38.42	
3rd place, bronze medalist(s)	4	Ana Vieira (54.67); Stephanie Balduccini (54.08); Giovanna Diamante (55.39); Celine Bispo (55.80)	Brazil	3:39.94	
4	1	Athena Meneses (56.46); Sofía Revilak (55.90); Andrea Sansores (56.45); María Mata Cocco (56.09)	Mexico	3:44.90	
5	6	Lorena González (57.31); Andrea Becali (55.64); Laurent Estrada (56.71); Elisbet Gámez (55.31)	Cuba	3:44.97	
6	7	Andrea Berrino (57.14); Guillermina Ruggiero (56.67); Macaderna Ceballos (57.73); Lucía Gauna (56.30)	Argentina	3:47.84	
7	2	Sirena Rowe (56.90); Isabella Bedoya (57.59); Karen Durango (57.42); Isabella Arcila (56.30)	Colombia	3:48.21	
8	8	Carla Gonzalez (56.03); María Yegres (57.00); Fabiana Pesce (58.21); Mercedes Toledo (57.01)	Venezuela	3:48.25	
