= 2019 FINA World Junior Swimming Championships =

Seventh iteration of the World Junior Swimming Championships

- Host city: Budapest, Hungary
- Date: 20–25 August
- Venue: Danube Arena
- Nations: 126
- Athletes: 814

The 7th FINA World Junior Swimming Championships, was held in Budapest, Hungary, at the Danube Arena from 20 to 25 August 2019. The championships were for girls aged 14–17 and boys aged 15–18.

== Medal summary ==
=== Medal table ===
* Host nation (Hungary)

Rank	Nation	Gold	Silver	Bronze	Total
1	United States	18	10	9	37
2	Russia	7	11	4	22
3	Australia	4	5	4	13
4	Italy	3	2	7	12
5	Canada	2	5	5	12
6	Croatia	2	0	0	2
7	Hungary*	1	1	0	2
7	Spain	1	1	0	2
9	Greece	1	0	1	2
10	Czech Republic	1	0	0	1
10	New Zealand	1	0	0	1
10	Ukraine	1	0	0	1
13	Japan	0	3	3	6
14	Belarus	0	2	0	2
15	Great Britain	0	1	3	4
16	Sweden	0	1	1	2
17	Austria	0	1	0	1
18	France	0	0	2	2
19	Brazil	0	0	1	1
19	Bulgaria	0	0	1	1
Totals (20 entries)		42	43	41	126

=== Men ===
Event	Gold		Silver		Bronze	
50 m freestyle	Vladyslav Bukhov; Ukraine	22.13	David Curtiss; United States	22.14	Adam Chaney; United States	22.40
100 m freestyle	Andrey Minakov; Russia	48.73	Joshua Liendo; Canada	49.17	Robin Hanson; Sweden	49.25
200 m freestyle	Luca Urlando; United States	1:46.97	Robin Hanson; Sweden	1:47.03	Murilo Sartori; Brazil	1:47.39
400 m freestyle	Gábor Zombori; Hungary	3:46.06; CR	Thomas Neill; Australia	3:46.27	Aleksandr Egorov; Russia	3:47.36
800 m freestyle	Franko Grgić; Croatia	7:45.92; NR	Ilia Sibirtsev; Russia	7:48.05	Thomas Neill; Australia	7:48.65
1500 m freestyle	Franko Grgić; Croatia	14:46.09; WJ, NR	Thomas Neill; Australia	14:59.19	Ilia Sibirtsev; Russia	15:05.17
50 m backstroke	Jan Čejka; Czech Republic	25.08; NR	Wyatt Davis; United States	25.23	Thomas Ceccon; Italy	25.35
100 m backstroke	Thomas Ceccon; Italy	53.46; CR	Nikolay Zuev; Russia	53.59	Wyatt Davis; United States	54.14
200 m backstroke	Wyatt Davis; United States	1:58.18	Carson Foster; United States	1:58.47	Mewen Tomac; France	1:58.71
50 m breaststroke	Vladislav Gerasimenko; Russia	27.58	Gabe Mastromatteo; Canada	27.73	Archie Goodburn; Great Britain	27.83
100 m breaststroke	Vladislav Gerasimenko; Russia	59.97	Josh Matheny; United States	1:00.17	Kevin Houseman; United States	1:00.55
200 m breaststroke	Josh Matheny; United States	2:09.40; CR	Shoma Sato; Japan	2:09.56	Yuta Arai; Japan	2:10.84
50 m butterfly	Thomas Ceccon; Italy	23.37	Andrey Minakov; Russia	23.39	Josif Miladinov; Bulgaria	23.48; NR
100 m butterfly	Andrey Minakov; Russia	51.25	Federico Burdisso; Italy	51.83	Egor Pavlov; Russia	51.90
200 m butterfly	Luca Urlando; United States	1:55.02	Tomoru Honda; Japan	1:55.31	Federico Burdisso; Italy	1:55.39
200 m individual medley	Carson Foster; United States	1:58.46; CR	Finlay Knox; Canada	1:59.44	Apostolos Papastamos; Greece	1:59.62
400 m individual medley	Apostolos Papastamos; Greece	4:11.93; WJ, NR	Ilya Borodin; Russia	4:12.95; NR	Léon Marchand; France	4:16.37; NR
4×100 m freestyle relay	United States (USA); Jake Magahey (49.51); Luca Urlando (48.73); Adam Chaney (48.64); Carson Foster (48.92); Jack Alexy^{[a]} Matt Brownstead^{[a]} Jack Armstrong^{[a]}	3:15.80; WJ	Russia (RUS); Arseniy Chivilev (50.23); Aleksandr Shchegolev (48.54); Egor Pavlov (49.67); Andrey Minakov (47.82); Pavel Samusenko^{[a]} Aleksey Fedkin^{[a]}	3:16.26	Italy (ITA); Federico Burdisso (49.38); Thomas Ceccon (48.59); Mario Nicotra (49.65); Stefano Nicetto (48.67); Paolo Conte Bonin^{[a]}	3:16.29
4×200 m freestyle relay	United States (USA); Jake Magahey (1:48.11); Luca Urlando (1:47.13); Jake Mitchell (1:47.03); Carson Foster (1:46.10); Dare Rose^{[a]} Wyatt Davis^{[a]}	7:08.37; WJ	Russia (RUS); Nikita Danilov (1:48.76); Aleksandr Shchegolev (1:46.36); Maksim Aleksandrov (1:48.38); Aleksandr Egorov (1:48.40); Egor Pavlov^{[a]} Roman Moskalenko^{[a]}	7:11.90	Australia (AUS); Thomas Neill (1:47.58); Mitchell Tinsley (1:49.85); Thomas Hauck (1:48.65); Alexander Grant (1:48.98); Noah Millard^{[a]}	7:15.06
4×100 m medley relay	Russia (RUS); Nikolay Zuev (53.84); Vladislav Gerasimenko (59.53); Andrey Minakov (50.93); Aleksandr Shchegolev (48.89); Pavel Samulenko^{[a]} Alexander Zhigalov^{[a]} Egor Pavlov^{[a]} Aleksei Fedkin^{[a]}	3:33.19; WJ	United States (USA); Will Grant (54.45); Josh Matheny (59.55); Blake Manoff (51.72); Adam Chaney (47.94); Wyatt Davis^{[a]} Kevin Houseman^{[a]} Dare Rose^{[a]} Jack Armstrong^{[a]}	3:33.66	Canada (CAN); Cole Pratt (54.79); Gabe Mastromatteo (59.82); Joshua Liendo (51.90); Finlay Knox (49.84); Tyler Wall^{[a]}	3:36.35

^{a} Swimmers who participated in the heats only and received medals.

=== Women ===
Event	Gold		Silver		Bronze	
50 m freestyle	Gretchen Walsh; United States	24.71	Maxine Parker; United States	24.75	Meg Harris; Australia	24.89
100 m freestyle	Gretchen Walsh; United States	53.74	Torri Huske; United States	54.54	Meg Harris; Australia	54.58
200 m freestyle	Erika Fairweather; New Zealand	1:57.96	Lani Pallister; Australia	1:58.09	Emma O'Croinin; Canada	1:58.64
400 m freestyle	Lani Pallister; Australia	4:05.42; CR	Emma O'Croinin; Canada	4:08.11	Rachel Stege; United States	4:08.30
800 m freestyle	Lani Pallister; Australia	8:22.49; CR	Miyu Namba; Japan	8:27.24	Giulia Salin; Italy	8:28.99
1500 m freestyle	Lani Pallister; Australia	15:58.86; CR	Giulia Salin; Italy	16:14.00	Chase Travis; United States	16:18.04
50 m backstroke	Bronte Job; Australia	27.87	Jade Hannah; Canada Daria Vaskina; Russia	27.91	None awarded	
100 m backstroke	Jade Hannah; Canada	59.63	Claire Curzan; United States	1:00.00	Daria Vaskina; Russia	1:00.02
200 m backstroke	Jade Hannah; Canada	2:09.28	Lena Grabowski; Austria	2:10.27	Erika Gaetani; Italy	2:10.52
50 m breaststroke	Benedetta Pilato; Italy	30.60	Kayla van der Merwe; Great Britain	30.91	Kaitlyn Dobler; United States	30.92
100 m breaststroke	Evgeniia Chikunova; Russia	1:06.93	Kaitlyn Dobler; United States	1:06.97	Kayla van der Merwe; Great Britain	1:07.06
200 m breaststroke	Evgeniia Chikunova; Russia	2:24.03	Anastasia Makarova; Russia	2:24.39	Mei Ishihara; Japan	2:24.99
50 m butterfly	Torri Huske; United States	25.70	Anastasiya Shkurdai; Belarus	25.77; NR	Claire Curzan; United States	25.81
100 m butterfly	Torri Huske; United States	57.71	Anastasiya Shkurdai; Belarus	57.98	Claire Curzan; United States	58.37
200 m butterfly	Lillie Nordmann; United States	2:08.24	Blanka Berecz; Hungary	2:08.93	Charlotte Hook; United States	2:09.00
200 m individual medley	Justina Kozan; United States	2:11.55	Alba Vázquez; Spain	2:13.43	Mei Ishihara; Japan	2:13.52
400 m individual medley	Alba Vázquez; Spain	4:38.53; WJ	Isabel Gormley; United States	4:39.15	Michaella Glenister; Great Britain	4:39.35
4×100 m freestyle relay	United States (USA); Gretchen Walsh (54.13); Torri Huske (54.50); Grace Cooper (55.04); Amy Tang (53.94); Maxine Parker^{[b]} Justina Kozan^{[b]} Erin Gemmell^{[b]}	3:37.61	Australia (AUS); Mollie O'Callaghan (55.07); Meg Harris (55.51); Lani Pallister (55.23); Rebecca Jacobson (55.04); Gabriella Peiniger^{[b]} Michaela Ryan^{[b]}	3:40.85	Italy (ITA); Chiara Tarantino (55.47); Maria Masciopinto (55.39); Emma Menicucci (55.37); Gaia Pesenti (55.81)	3:42.04
4×200 m freestyle relay	United States (USA); Lillie Nordmann (1:59.31); Erin Gemmell (1:59.70); Justina Kozan (1:58.09); Claire Tuggle (1:58.39); Ashley Strouse^{[b]}	7:55.49	Australia (AUS); Lani Pallister (1:58.61); Michaela Ryan (1:59.11); Rebecca Jacobson (2:00.71); Jenna Forrester (1:59.44); Gabriella Peiniger^{[b]}	7:57.87	Canada (CAN); Brooklyn Douthwright (1:59.69); Katrina Bellio (2:00.61); Genevieve Sasseville (2:02.89); Emma O'Croinin (1:57.95); Hanna Henderson^{[b]}	8:01.14
4×100 m medley relay	United States (USA); Claire Curzan (1:00.75); Kaitlyn Dobler (1:07.51); Torri Huske (57.86); Gretchen Walsh (53.01); Annabel Crush^{[b]} Ellie Andrews^{[b]} Lillie Nordmann^{[b]} Amy Tang^{[b]}	3:59.13	Russia (RUS); Daria Vaskina (59.90); Evgeniia Chikunova (1:07.45); Aleksandra Sabitova (58.47); Ekaterina Nikonova (54.48); Anastasia Makarova^{[b]} Iana Sattarova^{[b]}	4:00.30	Canada (CAN); Jade Hannah (1:00.42); Avery Wiseman (1:08.23); Hanna Henderson (59.16); Brooklyn Douthwright (55.36); Genevieve Sasseville^{[b]}	4:03.17

^{b} Swimmers who participated in the heats only and received medals.

=== Mixed ===
Event	Gold		Silver		Bronze	
4×100 m freestyle relay	United States (USA); Luca Urlando (49.66); Adam Chaney (48.25); Amy Tang (54.18); Gretchen Walsh (53.83); Jake Magahey^{[c]} Carson Foster^{[c]} Grace Cooper^{[c]} Maxine Parker^{[c]}	3:25.92; WJ	Russia (RUS); Aleksandr Shchegolev (49.03); Andrey Minakov (48.21); Daria Trofimova (55.40); Ekaterina Nikonova (55.08); Arsenii Chivilev^{[c]} Pavel Samusenko^{[c]} Aleksandra Sabitova^{[c]}	3:27.72	Italy (ITA); Federico Burdisso (49.17); Thomas Ceccon (48.65); Chiara Tarantino (55.43); Costanza Cocconcelli (55.87); Mario Nicotra^{[c]} Paolo Conte Bonin^{[c]} Gaia Pesenti^{[c]} Emma Menicucci^{[c]}	3:29.12
4×100 m medley relay	United States (USA); Will Grant (53.89); Josh Matheny (59.31); Torri Huske (58.04); Gretchen Walsh (53.60); Wyatt Davis^{[c]} Kevin Houseman^{[c]} Justina Kozan^{[c]} Amy Tang^{[c]}	3:44.84; WJ	Russia (RUS); Nikolay Zuev (54.27); Anastasia Makarova (1:07.30); Andrey Minakov (51.66); Ekaterina Nikonova (54.83); Pavel Samusenko^{[c]} Alexander Zhigalov^{[c]} Aleksandra Sabitova^{[c]} Daria Trofimova^{[c]}	3:48.06	Canada (CAN); Jade Hannah (1:00.23); Gabe Mastromatteo (1:00.58); Joshua Liendo (52.33); Hanna Henderson (55.06); Brooklyn Douthwright^{[c]}	3:48.20

^{c} Swimmers who participated in the heats only and received medals.

== Participating countries ==
Swimmers from the following 126 countries competed at the Championships.

- Albania (11)
- Angola (2)
- Antigua and Barbuda (5)
- Argentina (8)
- Armenia (6)
- Aruba (3)
- Australia (30)
- Austria (5)
- Azerbaijan (1)
- Bahamas (3)
- Bahrain (3)
- Barbados (3)
- Belarus (5)
- Bolivia (7)
- Bosnia and Herzegovina (3)
- Botswana (3)
- Brazil (16)
- Brunei (1)
- Bulgaria (5)
- Cambodia (3)
- Canada (18)
- Cape Verde (1)
- Central African Republic (2)
- Chile (4)
- China (10)
- Chinese Taipei (1)
- Colombia (6)
- Cook Islands (2)
- Costa Rica (8)
- Croatia (8)
- Cuba (2)
- Curaçao (3)
- Czech Republic (10)
- Denmark (2)
- Djibouti (1)
- Dominican Republic (9)
- Ecuador (2)
- Egypt (2)
- Estonia (4)
- Ethiopia (2)
- Fiji (4)
- Finland (2)
- France (12)
- Germany (10)
- Ghana (3)
- Great Britain (10)
- Greece (5)
- Grenada (3)
- Guatemala (7)
- Honduras (10)
- Hong Kong (5)
- Hungary (30)
- India (7)
- Indonesia (3)
- Iran (3)
- Ireland (3)
- Israel (5)
- Italy (17)
- Jamaica (8)
- Japan (9)
- Jordan (4)
- Kazakhstan (2)
- Kenya (5)
- Kosovo (8)
- Kyrgyzstan (3)
- Latvia (3)
- Lebanon (6)
- Lithuania (6)
- Madagascar (9)
- Malaysia (4)
- Malawi (3)
- Maldives (3)
- Malta (6)
- Mexico (20)
- Moldova (1)
- Mongolia (8)
- Namibia (4)
- Nepal (8)
- New Zealand (7)
- Nigeria (4)
- North Korea (1)
- North Macedonia (2)
- Pakistan (9)
- Palestine (2)
- Panama (3)
- Paraguay (12)
- Peru (3)
- Philippines (7)
- Poland (11)
- Portugal (4)
- Puerto Rico (3)
- Romania (5)
- Russia (30)
- Saint Lucia (3)
- Saint Vincent and the Grenadines (2)
- Senegal (1)
- Serbia (4)
- Seychelles (4)
- Sierra Leone (3)
- Singapore (16)
- Slovakia (12)
- Slovenia (2)
- South Africa (25)
- South Korea (2)
- Spain (13)
- Sri Lanka (8)
- Sudan (6)
- Suriname (3)
- Sweden (2)
- Syria (3)
- Tajikistan (3)
- Tanzania (7)
- Timor-Leste (2)
- Tunisia (1)
- Turkey (19)
- United Arab Emirates (2)
- Uganda (3)
- Ukraine (13)
- Uruguay (4)
- United States (45)
- United States Virgin Islands (6)
- Uzbekistan (6)
- Venezuela (7)
- Vietnam (4)
- Zambia (5)
- Zimbabwe (4)
