= Urlando =

Urlando is a surname. Notable people with the surname include:

- Giampaolo Urlando (born 1945), Italian hammer thrower
- Luca Urlando (born 2002), American swimmer
