= Cole Pratt =

Canadian swimmer

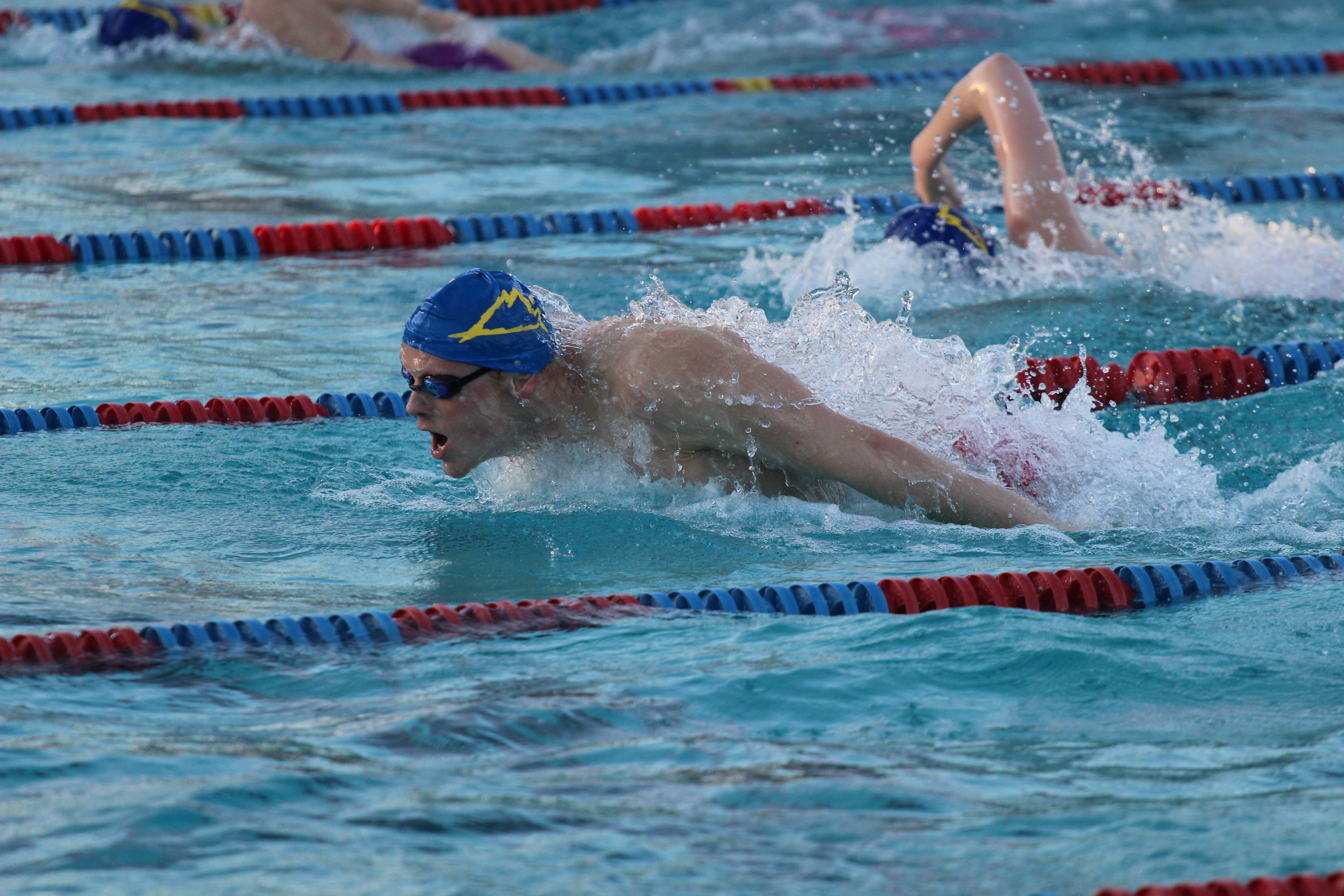
- Cole Pratt in 2020

Personal information
- Nationality: Canadian
- Born: 13 August 2002 (age 23) Regina, Saskatchewan, Canada
- Height: 191 cm (6 ft 3 in)
- Weight: 79 kg (174 lb)

Sport
- Sport: Swimming
- Strokes: Backstroke, medley
- Club: Cascade Swim Club; Toronto Titans Swim Club
Medal record
Men's swimming
Representing Canada
World Junior Championships
| Bronze medal – third place | 2019 Budapest | 4×100 m medley |
Junior Pan Pacific Championships
| Bronze medal – third place | 2018 Suva | 200 m backstroke |

Cole Pratt (born 13 August 2002) is a Canadian swimmer who competes primarily in the backstroke and individual medley races.

== Career ==
Pratt competed at the 2019 World Aquatics Championships in the men's 200 m backstroke, where he finished twenty-sixth overall, as well as in the 200 metre individual medley, where he finished thirty-sixth. At the 2019 World Junior Championships he competed in the 50 m backstroke, 100 m backstroke, 200 m backstroke, 200 m individual medley, the 4×100 metre freestyle relay (men & mixed), and the 4x100 metre medley relays (men & mixed). He won a bronze medal in the men's 4×100 m medley relay swimming the backstroke leg in 54.79.

Pratt broke the men's 200 m backstroke Canadian record SCM at the December 2019 Ontario Junior International (OJI) swim meet in a time of 1:51.30. He is tied for the record for the most medals ever won at a single Canada Games by a male athlete with ten. Pratt won those ten medals including five gold at the 2017 Canada Games in Winnipeg.

During the 2020–21 season of the International Swimming League, Pratt joined the league's expansion team the Toronto Titans. In June 2021, he qualified to represent Canada at the 2020 Summer Olympics. Pratt finished twenty-sixth in the heats of the 100 m backstroke.

== Personal ==
His older sister Halle Pratt competes as a member of Canada's artistic swimming team. Halle and Cole were one of three sets of siblings that represented Canada at the recent Tokyo 2020 Olympic Games.
