= Gabe Mastromatteo =

Canadian swimmer (born 2002)

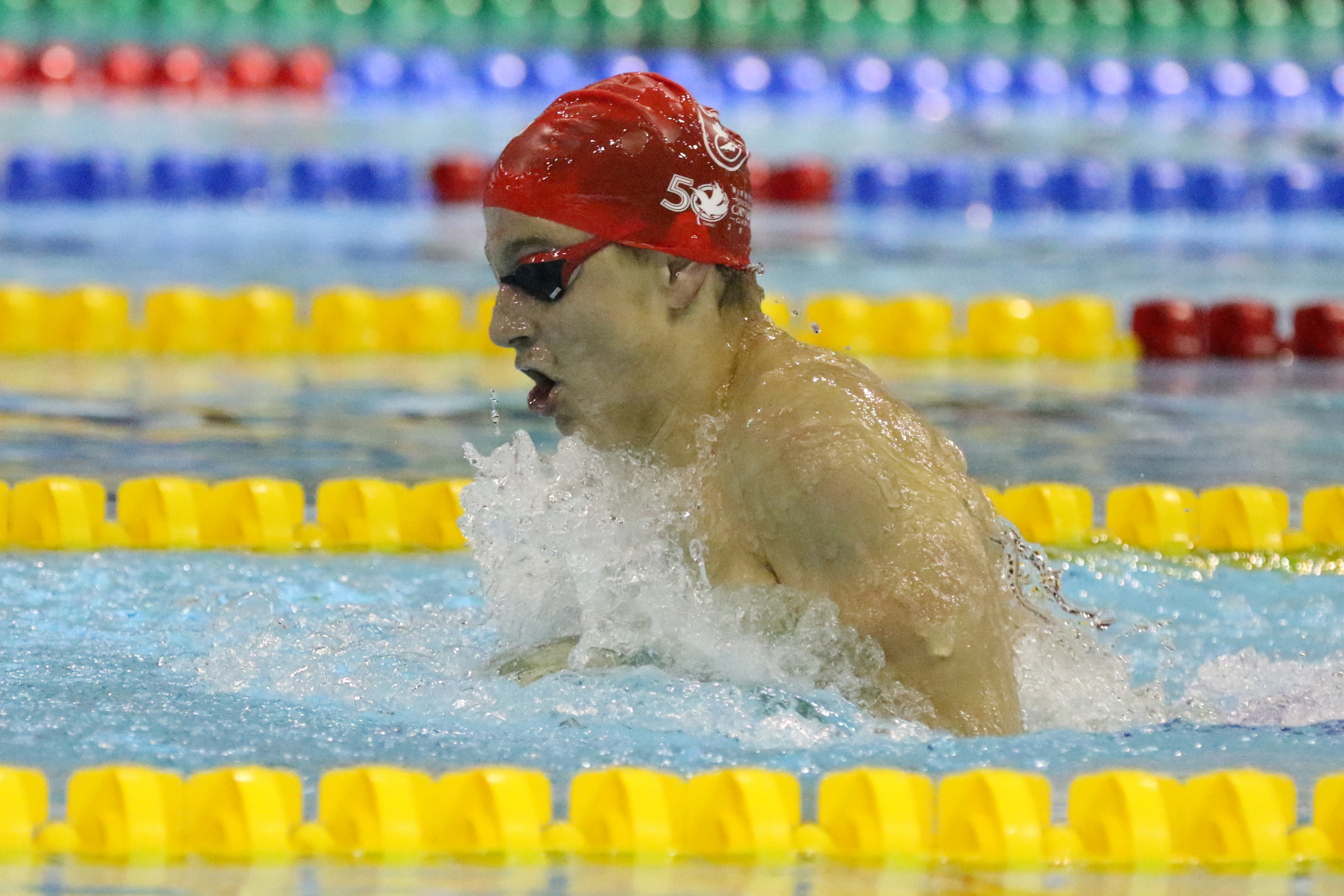
- Mastromatteo in 2017

Personal information
- Born: April 27, 2002 (age 24) Kenora, Ontario, Canada
- Height: 1.83 m (6 ft 0 in)

Sport
- Country: Canada
- Sport: Swimming
- Strokes: Breaststroke
- Club: Kenora Swimming Sharks
- College team: Toronto Varsity Blues
Medal record
Men's swimming
Representing Canada
Pan American Games
Silver medal – second place	2023 Santiago	Mixed 4 x 100 m medley
Bronze medal – third place	2023 Santiago	4 x 100 m medley
World Junior Championships
Gold medal – first place	2017 Indianapolis	4×100 m mixed medley
Silver medal – second place	2019 Budapest	50 m breaststroke
Bronze medal – third place	2019 Budapest	4×100 m medley
Bronze medal – third place	2019 Budapest	4×100 m mixed medley
Junior Pan Pacific Championships
Gold medal – first place	2018 Suva	100 m breaststroke
Silver medal – second place	2018 Suva	4×100 m mixed medley
Bronze medal – third place	2018 Suva	4×100 m medley

Gabe Mastromatteo (born April 27, 2002) is a Canadian competitive swimmer who specializes in the breastroke.

== Career ==
In 2017, Mastromatteo was part of the gold medal team that won the 4x100 mixed medley at the 2017 World Junior Swimming Championships. In 2019, Mastromatteo won 3 medals at the 2019 World Junior Swimming Championships in Budapest, including an individual silver medal in the 50 m breaststroke.

As part of the 2021 Canadian Olympic swimming trials in Toronto, Mastromatteo won the 100 m breaststroke race. This qualified him for the 2020 Summer Olympics in Tokyo. He placed thirty-eighth in the heats of the 100 m breaststroke, his lone individual event. He stated his main focus was on the 4x100 m medley relay, where the Canadian men's team made the final and placed seventh, with Mastromatteo swimming a new personal best relay time on the breaststroke leg.
