= Viviane Jungblut =

Brazilian swimmer (born 1996)

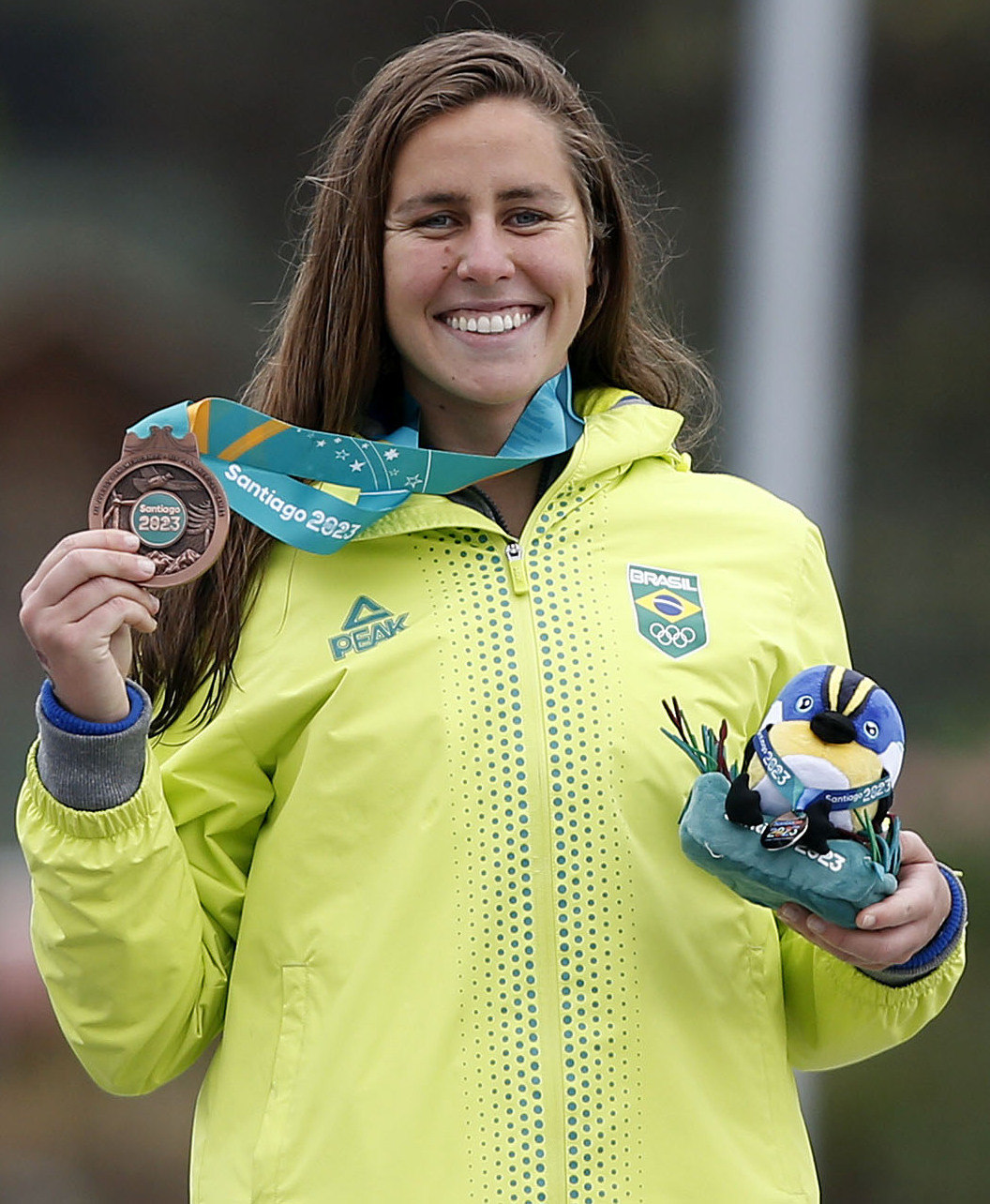
- Viviane Jungblut in 2023

Personal information
- Full name: Viviane Eichelberger Jungblut
- Nationality: Brazil
- Born: 29 June 1996 (age 30) Porto Alegre, Rio Grande do Sul, Brazil
- Height: 1.70 m (5 ft 7 in)
- Weight: 60 kg (132 lb)

Sport
- Sport: Swimming
- Strokes: Freestyle
- Club: GNU
Medal record
Women's open water swimming
Representing Brazil
Pan American Games
Bronze medal – third place	2019 Lima	10 km open water
Bronze medal – third place	2019 Lima	800 m freestyle
Bronze medal – third place	2023 Santiago	800 m freestyle
Bronze medal – third place	2023 Santiago	1500 m freestyle
Bronze medal – third place	2023 Santiago	10 km open water
South American Games
Silver medal – second place	2022 Asunción	10 km open water
Silver medal – second place	2026 Santa Fe	10 km open water

Viviane Eichelberger Jungblut (born 29 June 1996, in Porto Alegre) is a Brazilian swimmer.

== International career ==
At the 2014 Summer Youth Olympics in Nanjing, she finished 5th in the 4 × 100 metre freestyle relay, 9th in the 400 metre freestyle, and 11th in the 800 metre freestyle.

In September 2016, at the José Finkel Trophy (short course), she broke the South American Record in the 400m freestyle, with a time of 4:03.68, and broke the Brazilian record in the 800m freestyle, with a time of 8:19.57.

At the 2016 FINA World Swimming Championships (25 m) in Windsor, Canada, she finished 11th in the 800 metre freestyle and 18th in the Women's 400 metre freestyle.

At the 2017 Summer Universiade, she finished 4th in the Women's 10 kilometre marathon, 6th in the Women's 1500 metre freestyle (breaking the Brazilian record, with a time of 16:22.48) and 8th in the Women's 4 x 200 metre freestyle relay.

At the 2017 World Aquatics Championships in Budapest, she finished 6th in the Open water swimming Team, and 12th in the Open water swimming Women's 10 km.

At the 2018 Pan Pacific Swimming Championships in Tokyo, Japan, she finished 11th in the Women's 10 kilometre open water.

On 25 August 2016, at the José Finkel Trophy (short course), she broke the Brazilian Record in the 1500m freestyle, with a time of 16:03.29. She won the 2018 José Finkel Trophy in 1500 metres freestyle swimming format.

At the 2019 World Aquatics Championships in Gwangju, South Korea, she finished 4th in the Open water swimming Team, 12th in the Open water Women's 10 km, 21st in the Open water Women's 5 km, 19th in the Women's 800 metre freestyle and 20th in the Women's 1500 metre freestyle.

At the 2019 Pan American Games held in Lima, Peru, she won two bronze medals, in the Women's marathon 10 kilometres and in the Women's 800 metre freestyle. She also finished 6th in the Women's 400 metre freestyle.
