= Mariah Denigan =

American swimmer (born 2003)

Personal information
- Born: May 3, 2003 (age 23) Fairfield, Ohio, U.S.

Sport
- Sport: Swimming
- Strokes: Freestyle, Open Water, Individual Medley
- College team: Indiana University Bloomington
Medal record
Women's swimming
Representing the United States
Pan American Games
Silver medal – second place	2019 Lima	800 m freestyle
World Junior Open Water Championships
Silver medal – second place	2018 Eilat	Team event
Bronze medal – third place	2018 Eilat	5km open water
Junior Pan Pacific Championships
Silver medal – second place	2018 Suva	800 m freestyle
Silver medal – second place	2018 Suva	1500 m freestyle
Silver medal – second place	2018 Suva	400 m medley
Bronze medal – third place	2018 Suva	400 m freestyle

Mariah Denigan (/ˈdɛnɪɡən/ DEN-ih-ghən; born May 3, 2003) is an American swimmer, who specializes in open water and freestyle events. At the 2022 FINA World Swimming Championships in Budapest Hungary, Denigan swim both the 10 km open water (finishing 15th place), and the USA Mixed Team Relay (finishing in 7th).

== Medals ==
Denigan won the silver medal in the women's 800 metre freestyle event at the 2019 Pan American Games held in Lima, Peru. She also competed in the 400 metre and 1500 metre freestyle events. In the women's 400 metre individual medley event she finished in 5th place in the final.
