= Open water swimming at the 2022 South American Games =

Open water swimming competitions at the 2022 South American Games

- Venue: Playa San José
- Dates: October 11
- Competitors: 36 from 12 nations

Open water swimming competitions at the 2022 South American Games in Asunción, Paraguay were held on October 11, 2022 in Encarnación's Playa San José

== Medal summary ==
=== Medal table ===
* Host nation (Paraguay)

| Rank | Nation | Gold | Silver | Bronze | Total |
|---|---|---|---|---|---|
| 1 | Brazil (BRA) | 1 | 1 | 0 | 2 |
| 2 | Colombia (COL) | 1 | 0 | 0 | 1 |
| 3 | Ecuador (ECU) | 0 | 1 | 0 | 1 |
| 4 | Argentina (ARG) | 0 | 0 | 2 | 2 |
| Totals (4 entries) | | 2 | 2 | 2 | 6 |

=== Medalists ===
| Event | Gold | | Silver | | Bronze | |
|---|---|---|---|---|---|---|
| Men's 10 km | Juan Morales; Colombia | 1:52:32.00 | Esteban Enderica; Ecuador | 1:52:33.00 | Franco Cassini; Argentina | 1:52:34.00 |
| Women's 10 km | Ana Marcela Cunha; Brazil | 1:59:50.00 | Viviane Jungblut; Brazil | 1:59:51.00 | Cecilia Biagioli; Argentina | 1:59:52.00 |

== Participation ==
Twelve nations participated in open water swimming events of the 2022 South American Games.

- Argentina
- Aruba
- Bolivia
- Brazil
- Chile
- Colombia
- Curaçao
- Ecuador
- Paraguay
- Peru
- Uruguay
- Venezuela

== Results ==
Men's 10 km

| Rank | Name | Nationality | Time |
|---|---|---|---|
| 1st place, gold medalist(s) | Juan Morales | Colombia | 1:52:32 |
| 2nd place, silver medalist(s) | Esteban Enderica | Ecuador | 1:52:33 |
| 3rd place, bronze medalist(s) | Franco Cassini | Argentina | 1:52:34 |
| 4 | Diego Vera | Venezuela | 1:52:56 |
| 5 | David Farinango | Ecuador | 1:52:38 |
| 6 | Jhondry Segovia | Venezuela | 1:52:40 |
| 7 | Joaquín Moreno | Argentina | 1:52:42 |
| 8 | Bruce Almeida | Brazil | 1:53:44 |
| 9 | Luiz Loureiro | Brazil | 1:56:46 |
| 10 | Adrián Ywanaga | Peru | 2:04:21 |
| 11 | Maximiliano Paccot | Uruguay | 2:11:44 |
| 12 | Charles Hockin | Paraguay | 2:11:56 |
| 13 | Lucas Martínez | Uruguay | 2:12:24 |
| 14 | Jaime Arevalo | Bolivia | 2:12:59 |
| 15 | Diego Solano | Bolivia | 2:15:34 |
| | Joaquín Devoto | Peru | DNF |
| | Joaquín Estigarribia | Paraguay | DNF |

Women's 10 km

| Rank | Name | Nationality | Time |
|---|---|---|---|
| 1st place, gold medalist(s) | Ana Marcela Cunha | Brazil | 1:59:50 |
| 2nd place, silver medalist(s) | Viviane Jungblut | Brazil | 1:59:51 |
| 3rd place, bronze medalist(s) | Cecilia Biagioli | Argentina | 1:59:52 |
| 4 | María Bramont-Arias | Peru | 2:00:14 |
| 5 | Ana Victoria Abad | Ecuador | 2:06:00 |
| 6 | Fanny Ccollcca | Peru | 2:06:07 |
| 7 | Candela Giordanino | Argentina | 2:06:10 |
| 8 | Mahina Valdivia | Chile | 2:07:59 |
| 9 | Sofía Pascuzzo | Venezuela | 2:08:44 |
| 10 | Ruthseli Aponte | Venezuela | 2:10:11 |
| 11 | Britta Scwengle | Aruba | 2:12:58 |
| 12 | Samantha Van Vuure | Curaçao | 2:14:23 |
| 13 | Giuliana Alberti | Chile | 2:17:48 |
| 14 | Andrea Pereira | Ecuador | 2:17:50 |
| 15 | Fernanda Ramírez | Bolivia | 2:27:43 |
| | Leslie Rojas | Bolivia | DNF |
| | Angela Cardozo | Uruguay | DNF |
| | Luciana Codas | Paraguay | OTL |
| | Harumi Baigorria | Paraguay | DNF |
