= Swimming at the 2023 Pan American Games – Women's 1500 metre freestyle =

Women's 1500 metre freestyle at the 2023 Pan American Games
- Venue: Aquatic Center
- Dates: October 25, 2023
- Competitors: 12 from 9 nations
- Winning time: 16:13.59

Medalists
Gold medal	Rachel Stege	United States
Silver medal	Kristel Köbrich	Chile
Bronze medal	Viviane Jungblut	Brazil

The women's 1500 metre freestyle competition of the swimming events at the 2023 Pan American Games was held on October 25, 2023, at the Aquatic Center in Santiago.

== Records ==
Prior to this competition, the existing world and Pan American Games records were as follows:

World record	Katie Ledecky (USA)	15:20.48	Indianapolis, United States	May 16, 2018
Pan American Games record	Delfina Pignatiello (ARG)	16:16.54	Lima, Peru	August 10, 2019

The following record was established during the competition:

Date	Event	Swimmer	Nation	Time	Record
October 25	Final	Rachel Stege	United States	16:13.59	GR

== Results ==
KEY:	GR	Games record	NR	National record	PB	Personal best	SB	Seasonal best

The results were as follows:

Rank	Heat	Lane	Name	Nationality	Time	Notes
1st place, gold medalist(s)	2	7	Rachel Stege	United States	16:13.59	GR
2nd place, silver medalist(s)	2	3	Kristel Köbrich	Chile	16:14.59	
3rd place, bronze medalist(s)	2	5	Viviane Jungblut	Brazil	16:19.89	
4	2	4	Beatriz Dizotti	Brazil	16:24.65	
5	2	6	Agostina Hein	Argentina	16:35.63	
6	2	2	Erica Sullivan	United States	16:41.21	
7	2	1	Malena Santillán	Argentina	16:47.71	
8	2	8	Laila Oravsky	Canada	17:18.64	
9	1	5	María Yegres	Venezuela	17:26.48	
10	1	3	Kyra Rabess	Cayman Islands	17:35.40	
11	1	4	María Bramont-Arias	Peru	17:47.89	
12	1	6	Fátima Portillo	El Salvador	18:05.74	
