= Swimming at the 2023 Pan American Games – Women's 800 metre freestyle =

Women's 800 metre freestyle at the 2023 Pan American Games
- Venue: Aquatic Center
- Date: October 23, 2023
- Competitors: 17 from 11 nations

Medalists
Gold medal	Paige Madden	United States
Silver medal	Rachel Stege	United States
Bronze medal	Viviane Jungblut	Brazil

The women's 800 metre freestyle competition of the swimming events at the 2023 Pan American Games were held on October 23, 2023, at the Aquatic Center in Santiago, Chile.

== Records ==
Prior to this competition, the existing world and Pan American Games records were as follows:

World record	Katie Ledecky (USA)	8:04.79	Rio de Janeiro, Brazil	August 12, 2016
Pan American Games record	Henrique Rodrigues (BRA)	8:27.54	Toronto, Canada	July 18, 2015

== Results ==
KEY:	GR	Games record	NR	National record	PB	Personal best	SB	Seasonal best

=== Final ===
The final round was held on October 23 and divided into three different races.

Rank	Race	Lane	Name	Nationality	Time	Notes
1st place, gold medalist(s)	1	3	Paige Madden	United States	8:27.99	
2nd place, silver medalist(s)	1	6	Rachel Stege	United States	8:28.50	
3rd place, bronze medalist(s)	1	5	Viviane Jungblut	Brazil	8:33.55	
4	1	2	Kristel Köbrich	Chile	8:35.69	
5	1	4	Agostina Hein	Argentina	8:39.72	
6	1	1	Delfina Dini	Argentina	8:47.78	
7	1	7	Gabrielle Roncatto	Brazil	8:47.83	
8	3	4	María Yegres	Venezuela	9:01.12	
9	1	8	Laila Oravsky	Canada	9:05.45	
10	3	5	María Bramont-Arias	Peru	9:12.96	
11	3	7	Harper Barrowman	Cayman Islands	9:18.17	
12	3	6	Mahina Valvidia	Chile	9:21.95	
13	3	2	Ariana Valle	El Salvador	9:23.00	
14	3	3	Michell Ramirez	Honduras	9:36.50	
15	2	3	María Morales	Independent Athletes Team	9:42.25	
16	2	4	Ayelet Battaglia	Paraguay	9:57.08	
—	2	5	Natalia Kuipers	Virgin Islands	DNS	
