= Emma O'Croinin =

Canadian swimmer (born 2003)

Personal information
- Born: 22 May 2003 (age 23) Edmonton, Alberta, Canada
- Height: 182 cm (5 ft 11 in)

Sport
- Sport: Swimming
- Strokes: Freestyle
Medal record
Women's swimming
Representing Canada
World Championships (LC)
Bronze medal – third place	2019 Gwangju	4×200 m freestyle
Pan Pacific Championships
Bronze medal – third place	2026 Irvine	4×200 m freestyle
Pan American Games
Gold medal – first place	2023 Santiago	4×100 m freestyle
Bronze medal – third place	2023 Santiago	4×200 m freestyle
World Junior Championships
Silver medal – second place	2019 Budapest	400 m freestyle
Bronze medal – third place	2019 Budapest	200 m freestyle
Bronze medal – third place	2019 Budapest	4×200 m freestyle
Junior Pan Pac Championships
Bronze medal – third place	2018 Suva	1500 m freestyle

Emma O'Croinin (born 22 May 2003) is a Canadian swimmer. Her team won bronze in the women’s 4 × 200 m freestyle relay at the 2019 World Aquatics Championships.

In May 2024, O'Croinin was named to Canada's 2024 Olympic team.
