= Tomoru Honda =

Japanese swimmer (born 2001)

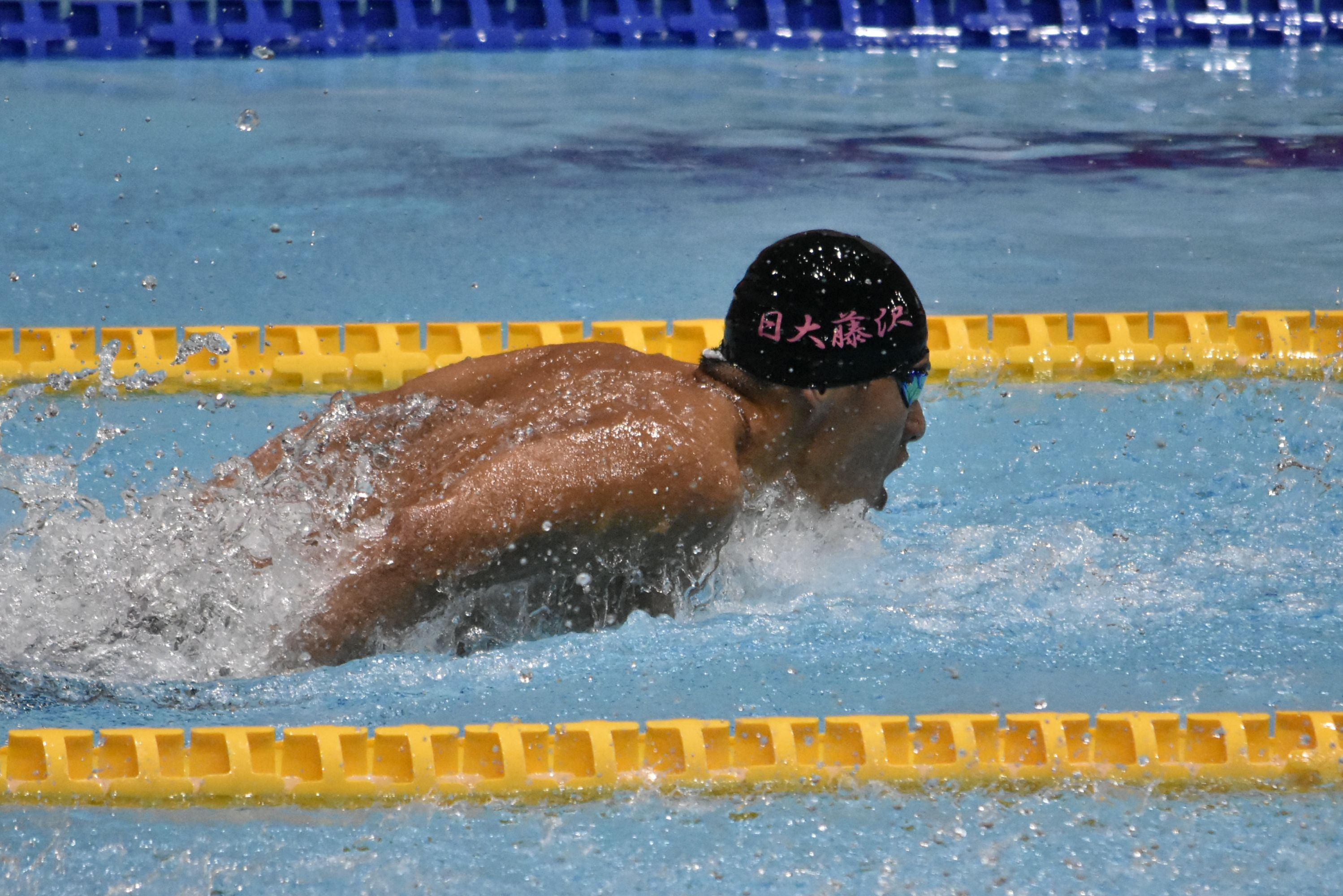
- Honda in 2020

Personal information
- Nationality: Japanese
- Born: 31 December 2001 (age 24) Yokohama, Japan
- Height: 1.73 m (5 ft 8 in)

Sport
- Country: Japan
- Sport: Swimming
- Strokes: Butterfly
Medal record
Men's swimming
Representing Japan
Olympic Games
Silver medal – second place	2020 Tokyo	200 m butterfly
World Championships (LC)
Gold medal – first place	2024 Doha	200 m butterfly
Bronze medal – third place	2022 Budapest	200 m butterfly
Bronze medal – third place	2023 Fukuoka	200 m butterfly
Asian Games
Gold medal – first place	2022 Hangzhou	400 m medley
Gold medal – first place	2022 Hangzhou	200 m butterfly
Bronze medal – third place	2022 Hangzhou	4x200 m freestyle
World Junior Championships
Silver medal – second place	2019 Budapest	200 m butterfly
Junior Pan Pacific Championships
Silver medal – second place	2018 Suva	4×100 m medley
Bronze medal – third place	2018 Suva	200 m butterfly

Tomoru Honda (Japanese: 本多 灯, Hepburn: Honda Tomoru; born 31 December 2001) is a Japanese competitive swimmer. He is the world record holder in the short course 200 metre butterfly. He won a silver medal at the 2020 Summer Olympics in the men's 200 metre butterfly event.

== Career ==
=== 2018–2019 ===
In August 2018, when Honda was 16 years old, he won the bronze medal in the 200 metre butterfly with a time of 1:58.70 and a silver medal in the 4×100 metre medley relay with a final time of 3:41.95 at the 2018 Junior Pan Pacific Swimming Championships in Suva, Fiji. The following year, at the 2019 FINA World Junior Swimming Championships held in August at Danube Arena in Budapest, Hungary, he won the silver medal in the 200 metre butterfly with a final mark of 1:55.31, sharing the podium with gold medalist Luca Urlando of the United States and bronze medalist Federico Burdisso of Italy.

=== 2021–2022 ===
Leading up to the 2020 Olympic Games, in April 2021 in Tokyo, Honda was one of two male swimmers to make the Japan Olympic Team in the 200 metre butterfly. At the 2020 Summer Olympics, held in the summer of 2021 in Tokyo, he finished second in the final of the 200 metre butterfly to win the silver medal with a time of 1:53.73, which was 2.48 seconds behind gold medalist Kristóf Milák of Hungary and 0.72 seconds ahead of bronze medalist Federico Burdisso. The following summer, at the 2022 World Aquatics Championships in Budapest, Hungary, he won the bronze medal in the 200 metre butterfly, this time finishing behind gold medalist Kristóf Milák and silver medalist Léon Marchand of France with a time of 1:53.61. Three days earlier in the Championships, he finished in a time of 4:12.20 in the final of the 400 metre individual medley to place seventh. On 22 October 2022, he won the gold medal in the short course 200 metre butterfly at the 64th edition of Japan's National Short Course Championships, held in Tokyo, with a world record time of 1:46.85.

=== 2023 ===
At the Japan Swim 2023, held in April in Tokyo, Honda won the silver medal in the 400 metre individual medley with a personal best time of 4:10.37. Two days later, on the third morning, he ranked first in the preliminaries of the 200 metre butterfly with a 1:54.43 and qualified for the final. In the evening, he won the gold medal with a 2023 World Aquatics Championships and 2022 Asian Games qualifying and personal best time of 1:53.34. The fifth morning, he finished in a time of 52.02 seconds in the preliminaries of the 100 metre butterfly, ranking fourth overall and qualifying for the final. He equalled his time of 52.02 seconds in the final, placing fifth.

== International championships ==
Meet	100 fly	200 fly	200 medley	400 medley	4×100 free	4×100 medley	4×100 mixed free	4×100 mixed medley
Junior level
PACJ 2018	5th	3rd place, bronze medalist(s)	23rd	2nd (b)		2nd place, silver medalist(s)	—N/a	—N/a
WJC 2019	11th	2nd place, silver medalist(s)		5th	12th	11th	12th	5th
Senior level
OG 2020		2nd place, silver medalist(s)					—N/a	
WC 2022		3rd place, bronze medalist(s)		7th			—N/a	

== Personal best times ==
=== Long course metres (50 m pool) ===
Event	Time	Meet	Location	Date	Ref
100 m butterfly	51.69	2022 Japan International Team Trials	Tokyo	5 March 2022	
200 m butterfly	1:53.34	2023 Japan Swim	Tokyo	6 April 2023	
400 m individual medley	4:10.37	2023 Japan Swim	Tokyo	4 April 2023	

=== Short course metres (25 m pool) ===
Event	Time	Meet	Location	Date	Notes	Ref
100 m butterfly	51.95	2020 Japan Short Course Championships	Japan	18 October 2020		
200 m butterfly	1:46.85	2022 Japan Short Course Championships	Tokyo	22 October 2022	WR	
200 m individual medley	1:51.97	2022 Japan Short Course Championships	Tokyo	23 October 2022		

== World records ==
=== Short course metres (25 m pool) ===
No.	Event	Time	Meet	Location	Date	Age	Status	Ref
1	200 m butterfly	1:46.85	64th Japan Short Course Championships	Tokyo	22 October 2022	20	Current	

== Personal life ==
Honda was born in Yokohama. In August 2026, Honda was indicted for dangerous driving resulting in an injury, and he admitted to the charges. He received a three-year-suspended sentence of one year in prison.

Records
Preceded by (Japan) Daiya Seto	Men's 200 metre butterfly world record holder (short course); 22 October 2022 – present	Succeeded by Incumbent
