= Egor Pavlov =

Russian swimmer

Personal information
- National team: Russia
- Born: 8 September 2001 (age 24) Russia

Sport
- Sport: Swimming
- Strokes: Butterfly, freestyle, backstroke
Medal record
Men's swimming
Representing Russia
Event	1st	2nd	3rd
European Championships (SC)	0	0	1
Swimming World Cup	0	0	1
World Junior Championships	1	2	1
Total	1	2	3
European Championships (SC)
Bronze medal – third place	2021 Kazan	200 m butterfly
Swimming World Cup
Bronze medal – third place	2021 Kazan	200 m butterfly
World Junior Championships
Gold medal – first place	2019 Budapest	4×100 m medley
Silver medal – second place	2019 Budapest	4×100 m freestyle
Silver medal – second place	2019 Budapest	4×200 m freestyle
Bronze medal – third place	2019 Budapest	100 m butterfly
European Junior Championships
Gold medal – first place	2018 Helsinki	4×100 m medley
Gold medal – first place	2018 Helsinki	4×100 m mixed medley
Gold medal – first place	2019 Kazan	4×100 m freestyle
Gold medal – first place	2019 Kazan	4×200 m freestyle
Gold medal – first place	2019 Kazan	4×100 m medley

Egor Pavlov (born 8 September 2001) is a Russian competitive swimmer. At the 2021 European Short Course Championships, he won the bronze medal in the 200 metre butterfly. He won the bronze medal in the 100 metre butterfly and one gold medal and two silver medals in relay events at the 2019 World Junior Championships. At the 2018 European Junior Championships and the 2019 European Junior Championships he won five gold medals in relay events.

== Background ==
Pavlov was born 8 September 2001 in Russia. He competes for the Penza Oblast region in Russian competitions.

== Career ==
=== 2018: Double European junior gold medalist as prelims-only relay swimmer ===
==== 2018 European Junior Championships ====
2018 European Junior Championships
Gold medal – first place	4×100 m mixed medley	3:47.99 (h)
Gold medal – first place	4×100 m medley	3:35.58 (h)

In the morning of the first day of competition, 4 July, at the 2018 European Junior Championships in Helsinki, Finland, Pavlov ranked 26th in the prelims heats of the 50 metre butterfly and did not advance to the semifinals. The next morning prelims session, Pavlov ranked fourth in the 200 metre butterfly heats and qualified for the semifinal with a time of 1:59.80. Later in the day Pavlov qualified for the final of the 200 metre butterfly, finishing in 1:59.47 and ranking sixth in the semifinals. On day three, 6 July, Pavlov placed fifth in the final of the 200 metre butterfly with a 1:57.96. In the morning prelims session on 7 July, Pavlov ranked eighth in the 50 metre backstroke with a time of 25.99 seconds and seventh in the 100 metre butterfly with his time of 53.74 seconds, qualifying for the semifinals of both events, as well as helping qualify the 4×100 metre mixed medley relay to the final by splitting a 53.58 for the butterfly leg of the relay. In the afternoon semifinals, Pavlov placed 15th in the 50 metre backstroke with a 26.56 and 11th in the 100 metre butterfly with a 54.02, not qualifying for the final in either event. The same session, when the 4×100 metre mixed medley relay swam a 3:47.99 and finished first in the final of the event, Pavlov won a gold medal for his efforts on the prelims relay. On the fifth and final day of competition, Pavlov split a 53.42 for the butterfly leg of the 4×100 metre medley relay, helping the qualify the relay to the final ranked third. Pavlov won a gold medal in the 4×100 metre medley relay for his prelims relay contributions when the finals relay placed first with a time of 3:35.58 in the final later the same day.

=== 2019: World junior bronze medalist in 100 metre butterfly ===
==== 2019 European Junior Championships ====
2019 European Junior Championships
Gold medal – first place	4×100 m freestyle	3:18.48
Gold medal – first place	4×200 m freestyle	7:16.49
Gold medal – first place	4×100 m medley	3:35.97 (h)

At the 2019 European Junior Championships, held at the Palace of Water Sports in Kazan, Pavlov ranked 14th in the prelims heats of the 50 metre butterfly, not advancing to the semifinals of the event as he was not one of the two fastest Russian swimmers, and split a 50.03 for the first leg of the 4×100 metre freestyle relay to help advance the relay to the final ranked second. In the final of the 4×100 metre freestyle relay, Pavlov split a 49.25 for the anchor leg of the relay, the fastest split time of his finals relay team, to help achieve a time of 3:18.48 and win the gold medal. The second day of competition, Pavlov advanced to the semifinals stage of competition in the morning prelims heats of the 200 metre butterfly. In the semifinals of the 200 metre butterfly, Pavlov was the only Russian to compete and ranked ninth, not qualifying for the final with his time of 2:01.11. On day three, Pavlov helped qualify the 4×200 metre freestyle relay to the final, splitting the fastest time amongst his prelims relay teammates with a 1:50.11. In the final, Pavlov helped win the gold medal, splitting a 1:49.70 for the third leg of the relay and contributing to the finals relay time of 7:16.49.

Pavlov ranked third in the prelims heats of the 100 metre butterfly on 6 July, qualifying for the semifinals with a time of 53.52 seconds. In the semifinals of the event later the same day, Pavlov lowered his time to a 53.24 and qualified for the final ranked fourth. The following morning, Pavlov swam the butterfly leg of the 4×100 metre medley relay in 53.72 seconds, helping qualify the relay to the final ranked first. In the afternoon, Pavlov placed fourth in the final of the 100 metre butterfly with a time of 52.99 seconds, finishing 1.33 seconds after gold medalist Andrey Minakov, also of Russia. The same finals session, Pavlov won a gold medal in the 4×100 metre medley relay for his prelims contributions when the finals relay finished first in a time of 3:35.97.

==== 2019 World Junior Championships ====
2019 World Junior Championships
Gold medal – first place	4×100 m medley	3:33.19 (h)
Silver medal – second place	4×100 m freestyle	3:16.26
Silver medal – second place	4×200 m freestyle	7:11.90 (h)
Bronze medal – third place	100 m butterfly	51.90

In August 2019, Pavlov won a gold medal in the 4×100 metre medley relay, silver medals in the 4×100 metre freestyle relay and the 4×200 metre freestyle relay, and a bronze medal in the 100 metre butterfly at the 2019 World Junior Championships held at Danube Arena in Budapest, Hungary. For the 4×100 metre freestyle relay, Pavlov split a 49.67 for the third leg of the relay in the final to help the relay win the silver medal with a time of 3:16.26. Pavlov ranked fifth in the prelims heats of the 100 metre butterfly with a time of 52.54 seconds, qualifying him for the semifinals. In the semifinals he followed up his prelims swim with a time of 52.11 seconds, advancing to the final of the event ranking third. Finishing third in the final of the 100 metre butterfly behind gold medalist Andrey Minakov and silver medalist Federico Burdisso of Italy with a personal best time of 51.90 seconds, Pavlov won the bronze medal.

Pavlov also helped advance the 4×200 metre freestyle relay to the final ranked third, swimming the second leg of the relay in 1:50.49, and won a silver medal for his efforts when the finals relay finished second with a time of 7:11.90. Two days later, Pavlov competed in the 200 metre butterfly prelims heats, where he ranked fifth with a 1:58.38 and qualified for the final. The same morning, he also swum the butterfly leg of the 4×100 metre medley relay in the heats, splitting a 52.76 to help the relay advance to the final ranked third. In the afternoon, Pavlov finished fifth in the final of the 200 metre butterfly, lowering his time to a 1:58.01. He won a gold medal later in the same finals session when the 4×100 metre medley relay finished first and all prelims and finals relay members received a gold medal for their efforts.

=== 2021: International senior debut ===
==== 2021 Swimming World Cup: Kazan ====
2021 World Cup – Kazan
Bronze medal – third place	200 m butterfly	1:55.45

At the 2021 Swimming World Cup stop in Kazan, Pavlov started competition on 28 October in the prelims heats of the 100 metre butterfly where he swam a time of 51.87 seconds and qualified for the final ranked eighth. In the 100 metre butterfly final later the same day, he placed eighth with a time of 51.61 seconds. The next day, Pavlov ranked first in the prelims heats of the 200 metre butterfly with his time of 1:55.64. Pavlov swam a 1:55.45 in the final, finishing third behind Tom Shields of the United States and Louis Croenen of Belgium to win the bronze medal.

==== 2021 European Short Course Championships ====
2021 European Championships (SC)
Bronze medal – third place	200 m butterfly	1:51.81

On the first day of competition at the 2021 European Short Course Championships in Kazan, 2 November, Pavlov ranked tenth in the prelims heats of the 100 metre butterfly with a time of 50.63 seconds, and did not qualify for the semifinals as he was not one of the two fastest swimmers from Russia for the event and the number of competitors from a country was capped at two for the semifinals. Two days later, Pavlov ranked first in the prelims heats of the 200 metre butterfly with a time of 1:51.99, which was 1.4 seconds faster than the second-ranked qualifier for the semifinals, Krzysztof Chmielewski of Poland. In the semifinals of the 200 metre butterfly later the same day, Pavlov qualified for the final with a 1:52.07 and ranked third overall. The following day, 5 November, Pavlov won the bronze medal in the final of the 200 metre butterfly with a personal best time of 1:51.81, finishing 1.57 seconds after gold medalist Alberto Razzetti of Italy and 0.7 seconds behind silver medalist Kristóf Milák of Hungary. Speaking to LEN about his bronze-medal-win, Pavlov said, "I managed to enhance my time, so I am pleased with the result."

=== 2022: Twice banned for his nationality ===
Hungry to make his debut at a World Short Course Swimming Championships at the 2022 World Short Course Championships, originally scheduled to be held in Kazan in his home country and later transplanted to the Melbourne Sports and Aquatic Centre in Australia, Pavlov had his home-country debut dreams squashed by FINA after they moved the event out Russia and then banned all Russians and Belarusians from their competitions at least from 21 April 2022 through 31 December 2022. Additionally, LEN opposed his presence at their competitions by banning him along with all other Russian and Belarusian competitors and officials starting 3 March 2022 and continuing indefinitely. While he and other Russians were allowed to compete at other competitions, not organized by LEN nor FINA, the times they achieved did not count for world records nor world rankings.

Continuing on with competition nationally instead, Pavlov won the bronze medal in the short course 200 metre butterfly during the second swimming portion of the 2022 Russian Solidarity Games in November, a competition for multiple sports and including multiple countries, achieving his medal with a personal best time of 1:51.37. In the 100 metre butterfly, he placed seventh in the final, finishing 0.72 seconds behind gold medalist Andrey Minakov with a time of 50.64 seconds.

=== 2023 ===
2023 Russian Championships (LC)
Bronze medal – third place	200 m butterfly	1:56.25

On 5 April 2023, World Aquatics (formerly FINA), renewed its ban on Russians and Belarusians (from 2022) indefinitely. On 17 April, the second day of the 2023 Russian National Championships at the Palace of Water Sports in Kazan, Pavlov ranked fifth in the preliminaries of the 100 metre butterfly with a time of 52.64 seconds and qualified for the evening semifinals. He lowered his time to a 52.11 in the semifinals and qualified for the final ranking sixth. In the final of the 100 metre butterfly on the third evening, he placed sixth with a time of 51.92 seconds. Later in the session, he contributed a split time of 50.72 seconds for the second leg of the Penza Oblast region relay team in the 4×100 metre mixed freestyle relay event to a final time of 3:36.76 and fourth-place finish. On day four, he placed 43rd in the 50 metre butterfly preliminaries with his time of 24.90 seconds. The following morning, he swam a 58.20 in the preliminaries of the 100 metre freestyle, placing 143rd overall. Day six of six, he started with a first-rank time of 1:58.04 in the preliminaries of the 200 metre butterfly, qualifying for the evening final. He lowered his time to a new personal best time of 1:56.25 in the final and won the bronze medal, finishing 0.57 seconds behind gold medalist Alexander Kudashev.

== International championships ==
Meet	50 back	50 fly	100 fly	200 fly	4×100 free	4×200 free	4×100 medley	4×100 mixed medley
EYOF 2017			4th (h)	2nd place, silver medalist(s)		—N/a		
EJC 2018	15th	26th	11th	5th			(gold) ^{[a]}	(gold) ^{[a]}
EJC 2019		14th (h)	4th	9th	1st place, gold medalist(s)	1st place, gold medalist(s)	(gold) ^{[a]}	
WJC 2019			3rd place, bronze medalist(s)	5th	2nd place, silver medalist(s)	(silver) ^{[a]}	(gold) ^{[a]}	
ESC 2021			10th (h)	3rd place, bronze medalist(s)	—N/a	—N/a	—N/a	—N/a

^{a} Pavlov swam only in the prelims heats.

== Personal best times ==
=== Long course metres (50 m pool) ===
Event	Time		Meet	Location	Date	Ref
50 m butterfly	24.29	†	2019 World Junior Championships	Budapest, Hungary	22 August 2019	
100 m butterfly	51.90		2019 World Junior Championships	Budapest, Hungary	22 August 2019	
200 m butterfly	1:56.25		2023 Russian National Championships	Kazan	21 April 2023	

Legend: † – en route to final mark

=== Short course metres (25 m pool) ===
Event	Time	Meet	Location	Date	Ref
50 m butterfly	23.48	2020 Russian Championships	Saint Petersburg	16 December 2020	
100 m butterfly	50.58	2020 Russian Championships	Saint Petersburg	16 December 2020	
200 m butterfly	1:51.37	2022 Solidarity Games	Kazan	20 November 2022	

== See also ==
- List of European Short Course Swimming Championships medalists (men)
