= Swimming at the 2019 Pan American Games – Women's 800 metre freestyle =

Women's 800 metre freestyle at the 2019 Pan American Games
- Venue: Villa Deportiva Nacional, VIDENA
- Dates: August 8 (Final)
- Competitors: 14 from 11 nations

Medalists
Gold medal	Delfina Pignatiello	Argentina
Silver medal	Mariah Denigan	United States
Bronze medal	Viviane Jungblut	Brazil

The women's 800 metre freestyle competition of the swimming events at the 2019 Pan American Games was held on 8 August 2019 at the Villa Deportiva Nacional Videna cluster.

== Records ==
Prior to this competition, the existing world and Pan American Games records were as follows:

World record	Katie Ledecky (USA)	8:04.79	Rio de Janeiro, Brazil	August 12, 2016
Pan American Games record	Sierra Schmidt (USA)	8:27.54	Toronto, Canada	July 15, 2015

== Results ==
KEY:	q	Fastest non-qualifiers	Q	Qualified	GR	Games record	NR	National record	PB	Personal best	SB	Seasonal best

=== Final ===
The final round was held on August 8.

Rank	Heat	Lane	Name	Nationality	Time	Notes
1st place, gold medalist(s)	2	5	Delfina Pignatiello	Argentina	8:29.42	
2nd place, silver medalist(s)	2	4	Mariah Denigan	United States	8:34.18	
3rd place, bronze medalist(s)	2	2	Viviane Jungblut	Brazil	8:36.04	
4	2	3	Kristel Köbrich	Chile	8:37.22	
5	2	6	Rebecca Mann	United States	8:38.25	
6	2	1	Allyson Macías Alba	Mexico	8:43.32	
7	2	7	Ana Marcela Cunha	Brazil	8:48.33	
8	2	8	Regina Caracas Ramírez	Mexico	8:51.90	
9	1	1	María Álvarez	Colombia	8:59.94	
10	1	4	María Bramont-Arias	Peru	9:04.18	
11	1	3	Michelle Jativa Revelo	Ecuador	9:13.28	
12	1	2	Jada Chatoor	Trinidad and Tobago	9:22.79	
13	1	6	Jennifer Ramirez Posada	Honduras	9:39.09	
14	1	7	Natalia Kuipers	Virgin Islands	9:46.26	
	1	5	Samantha Soriano	Peru	DNS	
