= VYPE High School Sports Magazine =

American sports magazine

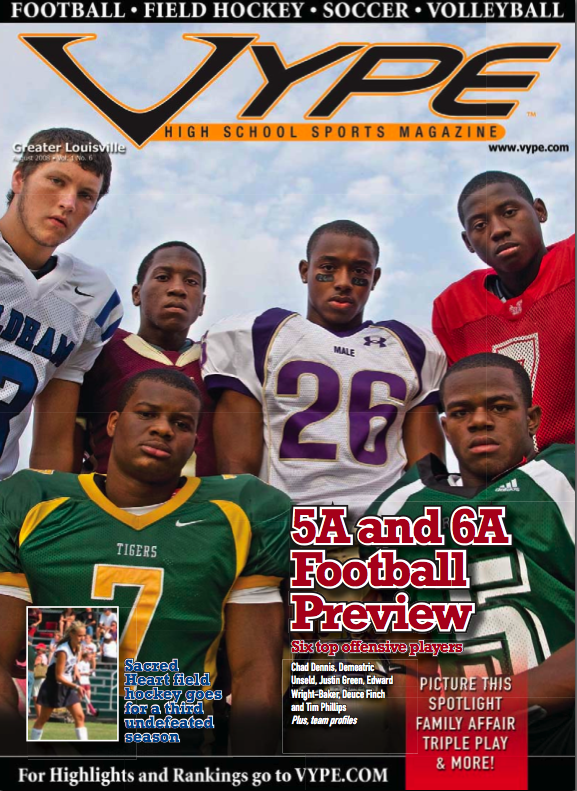
Greater Louisville July 2008 Cover

VYPE High School Sports Magazine (formerly High School Sports The Magazine) is a sports magazine in the United States providing in-depth coverage of high school sports. The magazine is printed monthly across 14 markets including:

- Tulsa, Oklahoma
- Oklahoma City, Oklahoma
- Wichita, Kansas
- Indianapolis, Indiana
- St. Paul, Minnesota
- Reading, Pennsylvania
- Louisville, Kentucky
- Fayetteville, Arkansas
- Ft. Worth, Texas
- Dallas County, Texas
- Collin County, Texas
- Houston, Texas
- Raleigh-Durham-Chapel Hill, NC
- Little Rock, Arkansas

The first magazine was launched in August 2005 in Tulsa, Oklahoma. It distributes 265,000 copies monthly and is read by over 1 million adults each month, according to the Circulation Verification Council Audit.

In 2008, the Oklahoma and Arkansas markets would be produced the First Annual Statewide Football Preview issues.

Along with football, High School Sports The Magazine also covers girls and boys basketball, girls and boys hockey, track, cross-country, field hockey, soccer, golf, baseball, softball, rowing, cheer, pom, dance, and the music programs.

== History ==
High School Sports The Magazine was founded by local businessman, Lynn Mitchell in early 2005 with a desire to cover all sports in the high schools around Tulsa, Oklahoma. The first magazine went to print in August 2005 and continued its success. In August 2006, innovative entrepreneur Kevin Hern of KTAK Management Corporation purchased High School Sports The Magazine, L.L.C. and quickly launched magazines in markets such as Oklahoma City and Fayetteville, Arkansas.

With the boom in high school students participating in sports, more interest was gaining each month.

The magazine underwent a re-branding to VYPE High School Sports Magazine in June 2008. VYPE is a mash up of Varsity and Hype and is an online community of athletes, parents, and fans at VYPE.com.

=== Timeline ===
- August 2005 – Eastern Oklahoma magazine launched
- November 2006 – Central Oklahoma magazine launched
- March 2007 – Central Indiana magazine launched
- July 2007 – Western Arkansas magazine launched
- August 2007 – Central Kansas magazine launched
- November 2007 – Collin County (Dallas) magazine launched
- November 2007 – Tarrant County (Ft. Worth) magazine launched
- November 2007 – St. Paul magazine launched
- November 2007 – Houston Web Property launched
- December 2007 – Greater Reading magazine launched
- January 2008 – New Jersey Web Property launched
- January 2008 – Charleston, South Carolina Web Property launched
- January 2008 – Europe Department of Defense Schools Web Property launched
- January 2008 – Pacific Rim Department of Defense Schools Web Property launched
- March 2008 - Birmingham web property launched
- March 2008 - Phoenix web property launched
- March 2008 - Los Angeles web property launched
- March 2008 - Denver web property launched
- March 2008 - Washington, D.C. web property launched
- March 2008 - Orlando web property launched
- March 2008 - Atlanta web property launched
- March 2008 - Honolulu web property launched
- March 2008 - Chicago web property launched
- March 2008 - Boston web property launched
- March 2008 - Detroit web property launched
- March 2008 - St. Louis web property launched
- March 2008 - Charlotte web property launched
- March 2008 - Omaha web property launched
- March 2008 - Las Vegas web property launched
- March 2008 - New York web property launched
- March 2008 - Cleveland web property launched
- March 2008 - Portland web property launched
- March 2008 - Philadelphia web property launched
- March 2008 - Charleston, SC web property launched
- March 2008 - Nashville web property launched
- March 2008 - Salt Lake City web property launched
- March 2008 - Seattle web property launched
- April 2008 – Greater Louisville magazine launched
- August 2008 - Raleigh-Durham-Chapel Hill magazine launched
- August 2008 - Houston magazine launched
- September 2008 - Central Arkansas magazine launched

== Editorial Policies ==
From its beginning, VYPE High School Sports Magazine has adhered to a number of editorial principles including:

- Full-color photos of high school athletes, unlike most black-and-white photos that are normally reserved for the inside or back pages of newspapers. VYPE High School Sports Magazine has taken full color, high-resolution photos of athletes, which fill their magazines.
- Positive reporting of each sport and their athletes. The Magazine has yet to cover a negative event in the high school sports realm.
- Department of Defense Schools coverage. There are a number of American student athletes that are playing for high schools overseas due to their parents being active duty in the military. VYPE.com is the first sports site to cover these schools and their athletes.

== Regular segments ==
- Triple Play - A question and answer feature inside each magazine that pits parent against coach of a certain athlete, to see who knows the student better.
- Locker Talk – These are features on local athletes achievements in the respective sports.
- Coaches Corner – This is a feature that pinpoints a particular coach and gets his perspective in regards to his profession.
