= Rachel Stege =

American swimmer (born 2003)

Personal information
- National team: United States
- Born: April 11, 2003 (age 23) Chicago, Illinois, U.S.
- Height: 6 ft 0 in (183 cm)

Sport
- Sport: Swimming
- Strokes: Freestyle
- Club: Athens Bulldog Swim Club
- College team: Georgia (2021–present)
Medal record
Women's swimming
Representing the United States
Event / 1st / 2nd / 3rd
Pan American Games
Gold medal – first place	2023 Santiago	1500 m freestyle
Gold medal – first place	2023 Santiago	4 x 200 m freestyle
Silver medal – second place	2023 Santiago	800 m freestyle

Rachel Stege (born April 11, 2003) is an American competitive swimmer. She won gold medals in the Women's 1500 metre freestyle, and the Women's 4 × 200 metre freestyle relay, at the 2023 Pan American Games.

== Career ==
At the 2019 world junior championships, Stege took home a bronze medal in the women's 400 metre freestyle event.

She swam for the University of Georgia.
