= 2018 Junior Pan Pacific Swimming Championships =

- Host city: Suva, Fiji
- Date(s): 23–26 August
- Venue(s): Damodar Aquatic Centre
- Events: 35

The 2018 Junior Pan Pacific Swimming Championships were held from 23 to 26 August 2018 at Damodar Aquatic Centre in Suva, Fiji, and were co-hosted by Fiji Swimming and USA Swimming. Competition was conducted in a long course (50 metre) pool. Finals were classified as A-final and B-final with medalists determined from the A-final.

Open water swimming was not contested due to the FINA World Junior Open Water Championships and a 4×100 metre mixed medley relay was introduced to the program.

== Results ==
=== Men ===
Event	Gold		Silver		Bronze	
50 m freestyle	Ashton Brinkworth; Australia	22.72	Drew Kibler; United States	22.81	Michael Pickett; New Zealand	22.86
100 m freestyle	Drew Kibler; United States	49.42	Keisuke Ishizaki; Japan	49.78	Adam Chaney; United States	50.01
200 m freestyle	Drew Kibler; United States	1:47.65; CR	Jake Magahey; United States	1:48.67	Keisuke Ishizaki; Japan	1:49.16
400 m freestyle	Ross Dant; United States	3:52.44	Brendon Smith; Australia	3:52.67	Ethan Heasley; United States	3:53.81
800 m freestyle	Ross Dant; United States	8:00.51	Cheng Long; China	8:02.79	Jake Magahey; United States	8:06.16
1500 m freestyle	Cheng Long; China	15:24.55	Arik Katz; United States	15:30.00	Ross Dant; United States	15:30.78
100 m backstroke	Destin Lasco; United States	55.75	Adam Chaney; United States	56.18	Daiki Yanagawa; Japan	56.28
200 m backstroke	Carson Foster; United States	1:59.10	Peter Larson; United States	1:59.24	Cole Pratt; Canada	2:00.82
100 m breaststroke	Gabe Mastromatteo; Canada	1:01.27	Daniel Roy; United States	1:01.85	Yamato Fukasawa; Japan	1:02.60
200 m breaststroke	Daniel Roy; United States	2:11.79	AJ Pouch; United States	2:11.80	Yamato Fukasawa; Japan	2:13.57
100 m butterfly	Luca Urlando; United States	52.40	Van Mathias; United States	53.11	Shaun Champion; Australia	53.66
200 m butterfly	Luca Urlando; United States	1:56.25	Van Mathias; United States	1:57.64	Tomoru Honda; Japan	1:58.70
200 m individual medley	Carson Foster; United States	1:59.86	Luca Urlando; United States	2:00.60	Masayuki Otake; Japan	2:00.72
400 m individual medley	Carson Foster; United States	4:14.73	Jake Foster; United States	4:15.78	Masayuki Otake; Japan	4:17.79
4×100 m freestyle relay	United States; Adam Chaney (50.09); Danny Kovac (50.26); Destin Lasco (49.76); Drew Kibler (49.33)	3:19.44	Australia; Ashton Brinkworth (50.12); Angus McDonald (50.15); Jack Edie (50.71); Joseph Jackson (49.88)	3:20.86	Japan; Keisuke Ishizaki (49.89); Masayuki Otake (50.47); Shota Kumazawa (50.67); Taikan Tanaka (50.29)	3:44.73
4×200 m freestyle relay	United States; Jake Magahey (1:49.40); Drew Kibler (1:48.30); Dare Rose (1:49.04); Carson Foster (1:49.68)	7:16.42; CR	Japan; Keisuke Ishizaki (1:49.62); Masayuki Otake (1:50.00); Taiki Hayashi (1:52.25); Taikan Tanaka (1:49.53)	7:21.40	Australia; Ashton Brinkworth (1:50.92); Silas Harris (1:52.14); Thomas Neill (1:51.56); Brendon Smith (1:51.95)	7:26.57
4×100 m medley relay	United States; Peter Larson (56.21); Daniel Roy (1:01.57); Luca Urlando (52.23); Drew Kibler (49.03)	3:39.04	Japan; Daiki Yanagawa (56.25); Yamato Fukasawa (1:01.89); Tomoru Honda (54.05); Keisuke Ishizaki (49.76)	3:41.95	Canada; Tyler Wall (56.47); Gabe Mastromatteo (1:01.22); Joshua Liendo (53.65); Noah Cumby (50.71)	3:21.32

=== Women ===
Event	Gold		Silver		Bronze	
50 m freestyle	Maxine Parker; United States	25.39	Gretchen Walsh; United States	25.57	Natasha Ramsden; Australia	25.65
100 m freestyle	Gretchen Walsh; United States	54.47; CR	Lucie Nordmann; United States	54.74	Eliza King; Australia	54.92
200 m freestyle	Claire Tuggle; United States	1:58.58	Lani Pallister; Australia	1:59.00	Nagisa Ikemoto; Japan	1:59.02
400 m freestyle	Lani Pallister; Australia	4:07.76	Claire Tuggle; United States	4:10.31	Mariah Denigan; United States	4:12.59
800 m freestyle	Lani Pallister; Australia	8:29.65	Mariah Denigan; United States	8:30.01	Emma Weyant; United States	8:38.88
1500 m freestyle	Lani Pallister; Australia	16:08.09; CR	Mariah Denigan; United States	16:24.35	Emma O'Croinin; Canada	16:28.79
100 m backstroke	Phoebe Bacon; United States	59.72	Katharine Berkoff; United States	1:00.16	Madison Broad; Canada	1:00.53
200 m backstroke	Isabelle Stadden; United States	2:09.52	Madison Broad; Canada	2:10.73	Katharine Berkoff; United States	2:11.87
100 m breaststroke	Emily Weiss; United States	1:07.55; CR	Nina Kucheran; Canada	1:08.37	Avery Wiseman; Canada	1:08.52
200 m breaststroke	Shiori Asaba; Japan	2:27.48	Ella Nelson; United States	2:27.83	Honoka Tatsumu; Japan	2:29.12
100 m butterfly	Maggie Mac Neil; Canada	58.38; CR	Chiharu Iitsuka; Japan	59.51	Isabel Ivey; United States	59.81
200 m butterfly	Olivia Carter; United States	2:09.45	Mana Naito; Japan	2:10.33	Karin Takemura; Japan	2:10.66
200 m individual medley	Alexandra Walsh; United States	2:12.06	Karin Takemura; Japan	2:14.90	Mei Ishihara; Japan	2:14.91
400 m individual medley	Emma Weyant; United States	4:40.64	Mariah Denigan; United States	4:41.39	Mei Ishihara; Japan	4:45.43
4×100 m freestyle relay	United States; Gretchen Walsh (54.92); Alexandra Walsh (54.92); Isabel Ivey (55.76); Lucie Nordmann (54.50)	3:40.10	Australia; Eliza King (55.52); Abbey Webb (55.39); Natasha Ramsden (55.52); Lani Pallister (55.08)	3:41.51	Canada; Ainsley McMurray (56.55); Maggie Mac Neil (56.02); Sarah Watson (56.44); Hanna Henderson (55.72)	3:42.05
4×200 m freestyle relay	United States; Claire Tuggle (1:59.32); Isabel Ivey (1:59.73); Gretchen Walsh (1:59.72); Lucie Nordmann (1:59.16)	7:57.93; CR	Australia; Lani Pallister (1:58.83); Eliza King (2:00.45); Michaela Ryan (1:59.06); Abbey Webb (2:01.63)	7:59.97	Japan; Nagisa Ikemoto (2:01.49); Yui Ibayashi (2:04.11); Aoi Nakamura (2:03.64); Miyu Namba (1:59.79)	8:09.03
4×100 m medley relay	United States; Phoebe Bacon (1:00.49); Emily Weiss (1:08.52); Lucie Nordmann (58.57); Gretchen Walsh (54.75)	4:02.33; CR	Canada; Madison Broad (1:01.67); Nina Kucheran (1:09.36); Maggie Mac Neil (58.79); Ainsley McMurray (55.39)	4:05.21	Japan; Hikaru Yamasaki (1:02.80); Shiori Asaba (1:09.66); Chiharu Iitsuka (59.43); Nagisa Ikemoto (55.25)	4:07.14

=== Mixed ===
Event	Gold		Silver		Bronze	
4×100 m medley relay	United States; Phoebe Bacon (1:00.44); Daniel Roy (1:00.68); Luca Urlando (52.11); Gretchen Walsh (53.78)	3:47.01; CR	Canada; Tyler Wall (56.62); Gabe Mastromatteo (1:00.40); Maggie Mac Neil (58.58); Ainsley McMurray (55.67)	3:51.27	Japan; Riku Matsuyama (56.49); Yamato Fukasawa (1:01.67); Chiharu Iitsuka (59.77); Nagisa Ikemoto (55.79)	3:53.72

== Medal table ==
* Host nation (Fiji)

Rank	Nation	Gold	Silver	Bronze	Total
1	United States	27	19	8	54
2	Australia	4	5	4	13
3	Canada	2	4	6	12
4	Japan	1	6	16	23
5	China	1	1	0	2
6	New Zealand	0	0	1	1
Totals (6 entries)		35	35	35	105

== Championships records set ==
The following Championships records were set during the course of competition.

Day	Date	Event	Stage	Time	Name	Country
1	23 August	100 m backstroke (women)	Heats	59.72	Phoebe Bacon	United States
1	23 August	100 m backstroke (women)	Heats, Swim-off	59.59	Katharine Berkoff	United States
1	23 August	200 m freestyle (men)	Final	1:47.65	Drew Kibler	United States
1	23 August	4×100 m medley relay (mixed)	Final	3:47.01	Phoebe Bacon (1:00.44); Daniel Roy (1:00.68); Luca Urlando (52.11); Gretchen Walsh (53.78)	United States
2	24 August	100 m breaststroke (women)	Heats	1:07.61	Emily Weiss	United States
2	24 August	100 m freestyle (women)	Final	54.47	Gretchen Walsh	United States
2	24 August	100 m breaststroke (women)	Final	1:07.55	Emily Weiss	United States
2	24 August	4×200 m freestyle relay (women)	Final	7:57.93	Claire Tuggle (1:59.32); Isabel Ivey (1:59.73); Gretchen Walsh (1:59.72); Lucie Nordmann (1:59.16)	United States
2	24 August	4×200 m freestyle relay (men)	Final	7:16.42	Jake Magahey (1:49.40); Drew Kibler (1:48.30); Dare Rose (1:49.04); Carson Foster (1:49.68)	United States
3	25 August	200 m backstroke (women)	Heats	2:08.81	Isabelle Stadden	United States
3	25 August	100 m butterfly (women)	Final	58.38	Maggie Mac Neil	Canada
4	26 August	1500 m freestyle (women)	Final	16:08.09	Lani Pallister	Australia
4	26 August	4×100 m medley relay (women)	Final	4:02.33	Phoebe Bacon (1:00.49); Emily Weiss (1:08.52); Lucie Nordmann (58.57); Gretchen Walsh (54.75)	United States
