= Luca Urlando =

American swimmer (born 2002)

Gianluca Urlando
Personal information
- Full name: Gianluca Urlando
- National team: United States
- Born: March 16, 2002 (age 24) Sacramento, California, U.S.

Sport
- Sport: Swimming
- Strokes: Butterfly, freestyle, individual medley, backstroke
- Club: Davis Aquadarts (former)
- College team: University of Georgia
- Coach: Billy Doughty (former)
Medal record
Men's swimming
Representing United States
Event	1st	2nd	3rd
World Championships	1	0	0
Pan Pacific Championships	2	0	1
World Junior Championships	5	0	0
Total	8	0	1
World Championships (LC)
Gold medal – first place	2025 Singapore	200 m butterfly
Pan Pacific Championships
Gold medal – first place	2026 Irvine	200 m butterfly
Gold medal – first place	2026 Irvine	4×100 m medley
Bronze medal – third place	2026 Irvine	100 m butterfly
World Junior Championships
Gold medal – first place	2019 Budapest	4×100 m freestyle
Gold medal – first place	2019 Budapest	200 m freestyle
Gold medal – first place	2019 Budapest	4×100 m mixed freestyle
Gold medal – first place	2019 Budapest	4×200 m freestyle
Gold medal – first place	2019 Budapest	200 m butterfly
Junior Pan Pac Championships
Gold medal – first place	2018 Suva	200 m butterfly
Gold medal – first place	2018 Suva	4×100 m mixed medley
Gold medal – first place	2018 Suva	100 m butterfly
Gold medal – first place	2018 Suva	4×100 m medley
Silver medal – second place	2018 Suva	200 m medley

Gianluca Urlando (born March 16, 2002) is an American competitive swimmer. He is the former American record holder in the men's 100 yard backstroke and a world junior record holder in the men's 4×200 meter freestyle relay and the 4×100 meter mixed freestyle relay. As a sophomore (second year) in the NCAA for the Georgia Bulldogs at the 2022 NCAA Division I Championships, he became the first person to swim the 100 yard backstroke and 100 yard butterfly each in less than 44 seconds. At the 2019 World Junior Championships, he won gold medals in the 200 meter freestyle, 200 meter butterfly, 4×100 meter freestyle relay, 4×200 meter freestyle relay, and 4×100 meter mixed freestyle relay.

== Background ==
Urlando was born March 16, 2002, in Sacramento, California. His family has a history of athletic performance, his mother was a high school swimmer, his father was a national champion for Italy in discus throw, his grandmother was a member of the Italian national team in javelin throw, and his grandfather was a three-time Olympian for Italy in the hammer throw. Growing up, he trained under the guidance of Billy Doughty and competed for the Davis Aquadarts. He graduated from C. K. McClatchy High School before he started attending the University of Georgia in the autumn of 2020, where he is majoring in sport management and competes collegiately for the Georgia Bulldogs swim team.

== 2018–2019 ==
=== 2018 ===
At the 2018 Junior Pan Pacific Swimming Championships in Suva, Fiji, Urlando won gold medals in the 100 meter butterfly, 200 meter butterfly, 4×100 meter medley relay, and 4×100 mixed medley relay, a silver medal in the 200 meter individual medley, placed first in the b-final of the 4×200 meter freestyle relay, where he helped set a Championships record of 3:47.01, was disqualified in the 400 meter individual medley for not finishing the race on his back, and was declared a false start in the 200 meter backstroke. Later in the year, in December at the 2018 Speedo Winter Junior Championships, he set a new national age group record in the 200 yard butterfly with a 1:40.91 for the boys 15–16 age group, breaking the former record of 1:42.10 set by Michael Phelps in 2002.

=== 2019 ===
In May 2019, at the 2019 Mel Zajac Jr. International Meet in Vancouver, Canada, Urlando became the first American swimmer to swim the long course 200 meter butterfly faster than 1:54.40 seconds since Michael Phelps in 2016 with a time of 1:54.35. The next month, Urlando swam a 1:53.84 and broke the national age group record of 1:53.93 in the long course 200 meter butterfly, which was a world record when it was set in 2003 by Michael Phelps, for the boys 17–18 age group at the TYR Pro Swim Series meet in Clovis, California. A little over one month later, he won the national title in the 200 meter butterfly with a 1:54.92 at the 2019 US National Championships in Stanford, California. In the b-final of the 200 meter freestyle he took first-place with a personal best time of 1:46.51. He also placed eighth in the final of the 100 meter butterfly with a 52.31 and did not start the 400 meter freestyle.

==== 2019 World Junior Championships ====
2019 World Junior Championships
Gold medal – first place	4×100 m freestyle	3:15.80 (WJ, CR)
Gold medal – first place	200 m freestyle	1:46.97
Gold medal – first place	4×100 m mixed freestyle	3:25.92 (WJ, CR)
Gold medal – first place	4×200 m freestyle	7:08.37 (WJ, CR)
Gold medal – first place	200 m butterfly	1:55.02

Prior to the start of competition at the 2019 World Junior Championships in Budapest, Hungary at Danube Arena in August, Urlando was selected as one of the five captains for the United States team of swimmers. He won a total of five gold medals as part of competition. He won his first gold medal in the 4×100 meter freestyle relay, where he split a 48.73 for the second leg of the relay in the final to help achieve a world junior record and Championships record time of 3:15.80. For his second gold medal, Urlando won the 200 meter freestyle with a time of 1:46.97, finishing 0.06 seconds ahead of silver medalist in the event Robin Hanson of Sweden. Later in the same session, Urlando placed 12th in the semifinals of the 100 meter butterfly with a 53.24 and did not qualify for the final.

In the final of the 4×100 meter mixed freestyle relay, he won his third gold medal, splitting a 49.66 for the lead-off leg of the relay to contribute to the final time of 3:25.92 and help break the world junior record and Championships record by over 0.70 seconds. For the 50 meter butterfly, Urlando did not start the race. He won a fourth gold medal the same day, swimming a 1:47.13 for the second leg of the 4×200 meter freestyle relay and helping set new world junior and Championships records. In his seventh and final event of the Championships, Urlando won his fifth gold medal, this time placing first in the 200 meter butterfly with a time of 1:55.02.

==== 2019 U.S. Open Championships ====
In December 2019, at the 2019 U.S. Open Championships in Atlanta, Georgia, Urlando won the gold medal in the 200 meter butterfly with a Championships record time of 1:55.60. For the 100 meter butterfly, he placed fifth with a time of 52.59 seconds. He also won the b-final of the 400 meter freestyle in 3:52.69, finishing 0.09 seconds ahead of second-place finisher Bobby Finke. For the events in which he did not compete in the finals, Urlando placed 15th in the prelims heats of the 200 meter freestyle with a 1:49.98 and did not start the 100 meter freestyle nor the 200 meter individual medley.

== 2021–2022 ==
=== 2020 US Olympic Trials ===
At the 2020 US Olympic Trials in Omaha, Nebraska, held in June 2021 due to the COVID-19 pandemic, Urlando placed sixth in the semifinals of the 200 meter freestyle with a 1:46.93 and did not swim in the final of the event. For his next event, the 200 meter butterfly, he placed third in the final with a 1:55.43. In his third and final event, he took third-place in the final of the 100 meter butterfly with a personal best time of 51.64 seconds, which was less than half a second slower than second-place finisher Tom Shields.

=== 2021–2022: Sophomore collegiate season ===
His sophomore year (second year in the NCAA) as part of the Georgia Bulldogs, Urlando won the 100 yard butterfly with a time of 46.37 seconds and the 200 yard butterfly in 1:44.41 at a dual meet against the Tennessee Volunteers in January 2022. In the pre-scratch stage of lead-up to the 2022 Southeastern Conference, SEC, Championships, Urlando entered to compete in the 200 yard individual medley, 100 yard butterfly, 200 yard butterfly, 100 yard backstroke, 200 yard backstroke, and 100 yard freestyle.

==== 2022 Southeastern Conference Championships ====
For his first event of the 2022 Southeastern Conference Championships, Urlando swam a 19.57 for the butterfly leg of the 4×50 yard medley relay to contribute to a final time of 1:23.92 and overall fourth-place finish. Later in the same finals session, he split a 1:32.24 on the second leg of the 4×200 yard freestyle relay, helping finish second with a 6:09.32. For the prelims heats of the 200 yard individual medley the following day, he ranked as the fastest swimmer by over a quarter of a second with a 1:42.75 and qualified for the final. Later in the day, Urlando helped achieve a fourth-place finish in the final of the 4×50 yard freestyle relay, splitting a 19.00 for the second leg of the relay. He followed up the relay with a first-place finish in the final of the 200 yard individual medley in 1:41.19, breaking the pool record of 1:41.28 set by Chase Kalisz in 2017.

Day three of competition, Urlando ranked first in the prelims heats of the 100 yard butterfly in 45.32 and qualified for the final. He swam a time of 44.41 seconds in the final to win the event and break the pool record of 44.87 seconds set by Caeleb Dressel in 2017. His time made him the ninth-fastest person to swim the 100 yard butterfly in the NCAA, with his former best time of 44.97 seconds he had ranked as number thirty-two. The morning of the next day, Urlando swam a season best time of 1:40.14 in the 200 yard butterfly to qualify for the final ranking first by 0.92 seconds. His time also set new SEC Championships and pool records. Urlando lowered his Championships and pool records in the final with a personal best time of 1:39.00 to win 0.88 seconds ahead of second-place finisher Matthew Sates. Later in the session, he split a personal best time of 44.38 seconds for the backstroke leg of the 4×100 yard medley relay, becoming the eleventh fastest man to swim the 100 yard backstroke and helping achieve a fourth-place finish.

==== 2022 NCAA Championships ====
2022 NCAA Championships
Silver medal – second place	4×200 yd freestyle	6:05.59
Silver medal – second place	100 yd butterfly	43.80
Silver medal – second place	200 yd butterfly	1:38.82
Bronze medal – third place	200 yd individual medley	1:39.22

Urlando split a 1:30.58 for the second leg of the 4×200 yard freestyle relay at the 2022 NCAA Championships on day one, helping place second in 6:05.59. On the second day, he swam a personal best time of 1:40.65 in the morning prelims heats of the 200 yard individual relay, qualifying for the evening final ranking seventh. In the final he placed third with a time of 1:39.22. He finished his day two events in the 4×50 yard freestyle relay, helping achieve an eleventh-place finish in 1:16.99 by splitting a 18.79 for the second leg of the relay.

On day three, Urlando swam a personal best time of 44.24 seconds in the preliminary heats of the 100 yard butterfly to qualify for the evening final ranking third. He followed up his morning swim with a personal best time of 43.80 seconds in the final, placing second just 0.09 seconds behind first-place finisher Andrey Minakov and 0.10 seconds ahead of third-place finisher Youssef Ramadan. Later in the same session, Urlando broke the 100 yard backstroke NCAA, American, and US Open records of 43.49 seconds, set by Ryan Murphy as a junior (third year in the NCAA) in 2016, leading-off the 4×100 yard medley relay with a time of 43.35 seconds. The relay placed twelfth overall in the finals. With his time of 43.80 seconds in the 100 yard butterfly and 43.35 seconds for 100 yards of backstroke from the same session, he became the first person to swim both races faster than 44 seconds.

In the prelims heats of the 200 yard butterfly on the morning of the fourth and final day, Urlando swam a 1:39.79 to qualify for the final ranking second. He placed second in the final with a personal best time of 1:38.82. To conclude the Championships, he placed eleventh as part of the 4×100 yard freestyle relay in 2:48.81, leading-off the relay with a 41.71.

=== 2022 International Team Trials ===
In the prelims heats of the 200 meter butterfly on day one of the 2022 US International Team Trials in Greensboro, North Carolina in April, Urlando qualified for the final ranking fourth with a time of 1:56.32. Later the same day, he won the final with a time of 1:54.10 and qualified for the 2022 World Aquatics Championships team in the event. For the 200 meter freestyle prelims heats the following day, he qualified for the final ranking eighth with a time of 1:47.37. He went a 1:47.99 in the evening final, placing eighth. For his time of 51.72 seconds in the prelims heats of the 100 meter butterfly on the third day, he advanced to the final of the event ranking fifth. In the final, he swam four-hundredths of a second slower, finishing in fifth-place with a 51.76.

=== 2022 World Aquatics Championships ===
Day three of pool swimming competition at the 2022 World Aquatics Championships, held in Budapest, Hungary in June, Urlando started off the day with a 1:55.94 in the preliminaries of the 200 meter butterfly, qualifying for the semifinals ranking seventh. In the semifinals, he lowered his time to a 1:54.50 and qualified for the final ranking fifth with a time less than half a second slower than second-ranked Tomoru Honda of Japan. The following day, he swam a 1:54.92 in the final, placing fifth.

=== 2022 Swimming World Cup ===
For his first event at a FINA Swimming World Cup, Urlando swam a personal best time of 50.10 seconds in the preliminary heats of the 100 meter butterfly at the 2022 FINA Swimming World Cup in November in Indianapolis, ranking third overall and qualifying for the final before withdrawing from further competition in the event. Later in the morning, he was disqualified in the preliminary heats of the 100 meter individual medley. The cause for the disqualification was an improper turn, which how he executed, dislocated his shoulder and required surgery.

=== 2022 World Short Course Championships ===
Urlando was named to his first World Short Course Championships team in October, with USA Swimming selecting him for a 200-meter butterfly spot for the 2022 World Short Course Championships, held in December in Melbourne, Australia. In December, USA Swimming updated the roster, removing him and adding Trenton Julian in his place. The decision by USA Swimming to remove him from the roster followed a shoulder injury he received in November, the month after the roster announcement and the month before the Championships, that immobilized him from competing during the rest of the collegiate season (through March 2023, which included the year's Southeastern Conference Championships and NCAA Championships) as he underwent surgery and recovered. He continued on his studies at the University of Georgia, performing well enough both in school and in the pool for the meets he competed in to be one of 355 student-athletes named to the honor roll for the autumn 2022 term.

== International championships (50 m) ==
Meet	100 free	200 free	400 free	200 back	50 fly	100 fly	200 fly	200 IM	400 IM	4×100 free	4×200 free	4×100 medley	4×100 mixed free	4×100 mixed medley
Junior level
PACJ 2018				DFS	—N/a	1st place, gold medalist(s)	1st place, gold medalist(s)	2nd place, silver medalist(s)	DSQ		1st (b)	1st place, gold medalist(s)	—N/a	1st place, gold medalist(s)
WJC 2019		1st place, gold medalist(s)			DNS	12th	1st place, gold medalist(s)			1st place, gold medalist(s)	1st place, gold medalist(s)		1st place, gold medalist(s)	
Senior level
USOC 2019	DNS	15th (h)	1st (b)		—N/a	5th	1st place, gold medalist(s)	DNS		—N/a	—N/a	—N/a	—N/a	—N/a
WC 2022							5th							

== Personal best times ==
=== Long course meters (50 m pool) ===
Event	Time	Meet	Location	Date	Ref
200 m freestyle	1:46.51	2019 US National Championships	Stanford, California	August 1, 2019	
400 m freestyle	3:52.69	2019 U.S. Open Championships	Atlanta, Georgia	December 5, 2019	
100 m butterfly	50.99	2026 Pan Pacific Swimming Championships	Irvine, California	August 14, 2026	
200 m butterfly	1:51.87	Swimming at the 2025 World Aquatics Championships	Singapore	July 30, 2025	

=== Short course meters (25 m pool) ===
Event	Time		Meet	Location	Date	Ref
100 m butterfly	50.10	h	2022 FINA Swimming World Cup	Indianapolis, Indiana	November 3, 2022	

Legend: h – preliminary heat

=== Short course yards (25 yd pool) ===
Event	Time		Meet	Location	Date	Notes	Ref
100 yd backstroke	43.35	r	2022 NCAA Championships	Atlanta, Georgia	March 25, 2022		
100 yd butterfly	43.80		2022 NCAA Championships	Atlanta, Georgia	March 25, 2022		
200 yd butterfly	1:36.41		2025 UGA Fall Invitational	Athens, Georgia	November 21, 2025	NR, US	
200 yd individual medley	1:39.22		2022 NCAA Championships	Atlanta, Georgia	March 24, 2022		

Legend: e – equalled existing record; NR – American record; US – US Open record;
Records not set in finals: h – heat; sf – semifinal; r – relay 1st leg; rh – relay heat 1st leg; b – B final; † – en route to final mark; so – swim-off; tt – time trial

== Records ==
=== World junior records ===
==== Long course meters (50 m pool) ====
No.	Event	Time	Meet	Location	Date	Status	Age	Ref
1	4×100 m freestyle relay	3:15.80	2019 World Junior Championships	Budapest, Hungary	August 20, 2019	17	Former	
2	4×100 m mixed freestyle relay	3:25.92	2019 World Junior Championships	Budapest, Hungary	August 22, 2019	17	Former	
3	4×200 m freestyle relay	7:08.37	2019 World Junior Championships	Budapest, Hungary	August 23, 2019	17	Current	

=== National records ===
==== Short course yards (25 yd pool) ====
No.	Event	Time		Meet	Location	Date	Type	Status	Ref
1	100 yd backstroke	43.35	r	2022 NCAA Championships	Atlanta, Georgia	March 25, 2022	NR, US	Former	

Legend: e – equalled existing record; NR – American record; US – US Open record;
Records not set in finals: h – heat; sf – semifinal; r – relay 1st leg; rh – relay heat 1st leg; b – B final; † – en route to final mark; so – swim-off; tt – time trial

== Awards and honors ==
- SwimSwam, Top 100 (Men's): 2022 (#49)
- Southeastern Conference, SEC, Swimmer of the Meet (male): 2022 SEC Championships
- Southeastern Conference, SEC, Commissioner's Trophy (male): 2022
- University of Georgia, Honor Roll: Autumn 2022
- SwimSwam, Ultra Swimmer of the Month: February 2022
- Southeastern Conference, SEC, Swimmer of the Week (male): October 26, 2021, November 2, 2021, November 9, 2021
- SwimSwam, Swammy Award honorable mention, NCAA Breakout Swimmer of the Year (Men's): 2022
- SwimSwam, Swammy Award, Age Group Swimmer of the Year (boys 17–18): 2019
- SwimSwam, Swammy Award, Age Group Swimmer of the Year (boys 15–16): 2018
- Golden Goggle Awards, Male Athlete of the Year: 2025
