= Dare Rose =

American swimmer (born 2002)

Personal information
- Full name: Oludare Anthony Damilola Akinsanya Rose
- National team: United States
- Born: November 1, 2002 (age 23) New York City, U.S.
- Height: 6 ft 2 in (188 cm)
- Weight: 185 lb (84 kg)

Sport
- Sport: Swimming
- Strokes: Butterfly, freestyle, individual medley
- Club: Scarlet Aquatics
- College team: University of California, Berkeley
Medal record
Men's swimming
Representing the United States
Event	1st	2nd	3rd
World Championships (LC)	1	0	3
World Championships (SC)	0	2	0
World Junior Championships	1	1	0
Junior Pan Pac Championships	1	0	0
Total	3	3	3
World Championships (LC)
Gold medal – first place	2023 Fukuoka	4×100 m medley
Bronze medal – third place	2023 Fukuoka	4×100 m mixed medley
Bronze medal – third place	2023 Fukuoka	100 m butterfly
Bronze medal – third place	2025 Singapore	4×100 m medley
World Championships (SC)
Silver medal – second place	2024 Budapest	4×100 m medley
Silver medal – second place	2024 Budapest	4×100 m mixed medley
World Junior Championships
Gold medal – first place	2019 Budapest	4×200 m freestyle
Silver medal – second place	2019 Budapest	4×100 m medley
Junior Pan Pac Championships
Gold medal – first place	2018 Suva	4×200 m freestyle

Oludare Anthony Damilola Akinsanya Rose (born November 1, 2002) is an American competitive swimmer. At the 2023 World Aquatics Championships, he won a gold medal in the 4×100-meter medley relay. He currently competes at the collegiate level for the University of California, Berkeley.

== Early life and education ==
Rose was born in New York City to Anthony and Kemi Rose. He grew up in Jersey City, New Jersey. He joined his first swim team in summer league when he was six and went year-round when we was eight. He attended Packer Collegiate Institute, where he is the school record holder in multiple events, including the 50-yard and 100-yard freestyle, the 100-yard butterfly and 200-yard individual medley.

In January 2019, he verbally committed to University of California, Berkeley for the class of 2024 and swims collegiately for the California Golden Bears.

== Career ==
At the 2018 Junior Pan Pacific Swimming Championships, Rose won a gold medal in the 4×200-meter freestyle relay with a Championships record time of 7:16.42.

At the 2019 World Junior Championships, Rose swam the butterfly leg of the 4×100-meter medley relay in 52.55 during the heats and won a silver medal. He also won a gold medal in the 4×200-meter freestyle relay.

=== 2023 ===
At the 2023 USA Swimming Championships, Rose won the 100-meter butterfly event with a time of 50.74. As a result, he was named to team USA's roster for the 2023 World Aquatics Championships. In his first event at the 2023 World Championships, during the 50-meter butterfly on day one, he placed second in the semi-finals with a time of 22.79. He finished in sixth place during the final with a time of 23.01. On day four he swam the butterfly leg of the mixed 4×100-meter medley relay in 50.50 during the heats and won a bronze medal. On day six during the semi-finals of the 100-meter butterfly he finished in first place with a personal best time of 50.53. During the final he finished with a new personal best time of 50.46 and won a bronze medal, his first individual medal at an international competition. On the final day of the competition, he swam the butterfly leg of the 4×100-meter medley relay in 50.13 and won a gold medal. The medley relay team finished with a Championship record time of 3:27.20, surpassing the previous record of 3:27.28 set in 2009.

=== 2024 ===
At the 2024 United States Olympic trials he competed in the 100 m butterfly event where he finished in third place with a time of 50.84 seconds, missing qualification for the 2024 Summer Olympics team behind Thomas Heilman's time of 50.80 seconds.
