= Brooklyn Douthwright =

Canadian swimmer (born 2003)

Personal information
- Born: 20 May 2003 (age 23) Riverview, New Brunswick, Canada

Sport
- Country: Canada
- Sport: Swimming
- Strokes: Freestyle, medleys
- Club: Club de Natation Bleu et Or
- College team: Tennessee
- Coach: Ryan Allen
Medal record
Women's swimming
Representing Canada
World Championships (LC)
Bronze medal – third place	2025 Singapore	4×100 m mixed medley
Pan Pacific Championships
Bronze medal – third place	2026 Irvine	4×200 m freestyle
Pan American Games
Gold medal – first place	2023 Santiago	4×100 m freestyle
Gold medal – first place	2023 Santiago	4×100 m medley
Silver medal – second place	2023 Santiago	4×100 m mixed medley
Bronze medal – third place	2023 Santiago	4×100 m mixed freestyle
Bronze medal – third place	2023 Santiago	4×200 m freestyle
World Junior Championships
Bronze medal – third place	2019 Budapest	4×100 m medley
Bronze medal – third place	2019 Budapest	4×100 m freestyle
Bronze medal – third place	2019 Budapest	4×100 m mixed medley

Brooklyn Douthwright (born 20 May 2003) is a Canadian swimmer. She won five medals at the 2023 Pan American Games in relay events including golds in the 4 × 100 m freestyle relay, the 4 × 100 m medley relay, a silver in the 4 × 100 m mixed medley relay, and two bronze in the mixed 4 × 100 m freestyle relay and the 4 × 200 m freestyle relay. She also won three bronze medals in relays at the 2019 FINA World Junior Swimming Championships including in the 4 × 100 m medley, 4 × 100 m freestyle, and 4 × 100 m mixed medley.
