= Canada at the 2023 Pan American Games =

- Flag of Canada
- IOC code: CAN
- NOC: Canadian Olympic Committee

in Santiago, Chile 20 October 2023 – 5 November 2023
- Competitors: 480 in 39 sports
- Flag bearers (opening): Melissa Humana-Paredes & Brandie Wilkerson
- Flag bearers (closing): Philip Kim & Katie Vincent
- Medals Ranked 4th: Gold 46 Silver 55 Bronze 63 Total 164

Pan American Games appearances (overview)
- 1955; 1959; 1963; 1967; 1971; 1975; 1979; 1983; 1987; 1991; 1995; 1999; 2003; 2007; 2011; 2015; 2019; 2023

Canada competed at the 2023 Pan American Games in Santiago, Chile from October 20 to November 5, 2023. This was Canada's 18th appearance at the Pan American Games, having competed at every Games since the second edition in 1955. In February 2023, Guadalajara 2011 and London 2012 weightlifting gold medallist Christine Girard was named as the country's Chef De Mission.

On October 12, 2023 a final team of 473 athletes (208 men and 265 women) competing in 36 sports was confirmed by the Canadian Olympic Committee. A total of 235 coaches and support staff will also accompany the team. This number was later reduced to 469 (207 men and 262 women) after four athletes withdrew from the team.

Beach volleyball athletes Melissa Humana-Paredes and Brandie Wilkerson were the country's flagbearers during the opening ceremony. Meanwhile, gold medalists at the games breakdancer Philip Kim (Phil Wizard) and sprint canoeist Katie Vincent were the country's flagbearers during the closing ceremony.

The Canadian team finished with 164 medals, including 46 gold. Both numbers represent the second highest at a single non-hosted edition of the games. This placed Canada in fourth on the medal table, third in terms overall medals.

The Canadian team did not compete in the sports of baseball, basketball, basque pelota, football (soccer) and volleyball.

== Medallists ==
The following Canadian competitors won medals at the games. In the by discipline sections below, medalists' names are bolded.

Medal	Name	Sport	Event	Date
Gold	Gunnar Holmgren	Cycling	Men's cross-country	October 21
Gold	Jennifer Jackson	Cycling	Women's cross-country	October 21
Gold	Rachel Nicol	Swimming	Women's 100 metre breaststroke	October 21
Gold	Maggie Mac Neil; Brooklyn Douthwright; Katerine Savard; Mary-Sophie Harvey; Julie Brousseau; Emma O'Croinin	Swimming	Women's 4 × 100 metre freestyle relay	October 21
Gold	Fay De Fazio Ebert	Roller sports	Women's skateboarding park	October 22
Gold	Mary-Sophie Harvey	Swimming	Women's 200 metre freestyle	October 22
Gold	Maggie Mac Neil	Swimming	Women's 100 metre butterfly	October 22
Gold	Skylar Park	Taekwondo	Women's 57 kg	October 22
Gold	Pamela Ware	Diving	Women's 1 metre springboard	October 22
Gold	Félix Dolci	Gymnastics	Men's artistic individual all-around	October 23
Gold	Maggie Mac Neil	Swimming	Women's 100 metre freestyle	October 23
Gold	Sydney Pickrem	Swimming	Women's 200 metre breaststroke	October 23
Gold	Alizée Brien; Abigail Dent; Kendra Hartley; Parker Illingworth; Olivia McMurray; Shaye de Paiva; Abby Speirs; Leia Till; Kristen Kit	Rowing	Women's coxed eight	October 24
Gold	Dorien Llewellyn	Water skiing	Men's overall	October 24
Gold	Maggie Mac Neil	Swimming	Women's 50 metre freestyle	October 24
Gold	Julie Brousseau	Swimming	Women's 400 metre individual medley	October 24
Gold	Félix Dolci	Gymnastics	Men's floor	October 24
Gold	James Hedgcock; Tyler Rorke; Nick Wammes	Cycling	Men's track team sprint	October 24
Gold	Zachary Clay	Gymnastics	Men's pommel horse	October 24
Gold	Pamela Ware	Diving	Women's 3 metre springboard	October 24
Gold	Catherine Choi; Josephine Wu	Badminton	Women's doubles	October 25
Gold	Adam Dong; Nyl Yakura	Badminton	Men's doubles	October 25
Gold	Brian Yang	Badminton	Men's singles	October 25
Gold	Sydney Pickrem	Swimming	Women's 200 metre individual medley	October 25
Gold	Ty Lindeman; Josephine Wu	Badminton	Mixed doubles	October 25
Gold	Finlay Knox	Swimming	Men's 200 metre individual medley	October 25
Gold	Danielle Hanus; Mary-Sophie Harvey; Maggie Mac Neil; Rachel Nicol; Sophie Angus; Brooklyn Douthwright; Maddy Gatrall; Katerine Savard	Swimming	Women's 4 × 100 metre medley relay	October 25
Gold	Devaney Collier; Kiara Lylyk; Fiona Majendie; Ruby West	Cycling	Women's team pursuit	October 25
Gold	Tugrul Ozer	Shooting	Men's 10 metre air pistol	October 26
Gold	Tammara Thibeault	Boxing	Women's 75 kg	October 27
Gold	Wyatt Sanford	Boxing	Men's 63.5 kg	October 27
Gold	Chris Ernst; Michael Foley; Carson Mattern; Campbell Parrish; Sean Richardson	Cycling	Men's team pursuit	October 27
Gold	Colleen Loach; Karl Slezak; Lindsay Traisnel; Michael Winter	Equestrian	Team eventing	October 29
Gold	Shady El Nahas	Judo	Men's 100 kg	October 30
Gold	Dylan French	Fencing	Men's épée	October 30
Gold	Charles Philibert-Thiboutot	Athletics	Men's 1500 metres	November 2
Gold	Sarah Mitton	Athletics	Women's shot put	November 2
Gold	Michelle Russell	Canoeing	Women's K-1 500 metres	November 3
Gold	Ian Gaudet; Simon McTavish	Canoeing	Men's K-2 500 metres	November 3
Gold	Alix Plomteux; Craig Spence	Canoeing	Men's C-2 500 metres	November 3
Gold	Katie Vincent; Sloan MacKenzie	Canoeing	Women's C-2 500 metres	November 4
Gold	Lee Parkhill	Sailing	Men's sunfish	November 4
Gold	Phil Wizard	Breaking	B-Boys	November 4
Gold	Fares Arfa; François Cauchon; Shaul Gordon	Fencing	Men's team sabre	November 4
Gold	Ethan Katzberg	Athletics	Men's hammer throw	November 4
Gold	Jean-Simon Desgagnés	Athletics	Men's 3000 metres steeplechase	November 4
Silver	Sophie Angus	Swimming	Women's 100 metre breaststroke	October 21
Silver	René Cournoyer; Zachary Clay; Félix Dolci; William Émard; Jayson Rampersad	Gymnastics	Men's artistic team all-around	October 21
Silver	Molly Simpson	Cycling	Women's BMX racing	October 22
Silver	Maude Charron	Weightlifting	Women's 59 kg	October 22
Silver	Rylan Wiens; Nathan Zsombor-Murray	Diving	Men's 10 metre synchro platform	October 22
Silver	Mia Vallée	Diving	Women's 1 metre springboard	October 22
Silver	Abigail Dent; Olivia McMurray	Rowing	Women's coxless pair	October 23
Silver	Neilly Ross	Water skiing	Women's slalom	October 23
Silver	Dorien Llewellyn	Water skiing	Men's jump	October 23
Silver	Neilly Ross	Water skiing	Women's tricks	October 23
Silver	Dorien Llewellyn	Water skiing	Men's tricks	October 23
Silver	Kelsey Wog	Swimming	Women's 200 metre breaststroke	October 23
Silver	Brayden Taivassalo	Swimming	Men's 200 metre breaststroke	October 23
Silver	Javier Acevedo; Gabe Mastromatteo; Maggie Mac Neil; Mary-Sophie Harvey; James Dergousoff; Blake Tierney; Brooklyn Douthwright; Katerine Savard	Swimming	Mixed 4 × 100 metre medley relay	October 23
Silver	Caeli McKay; Kate Miller	Diving	Women's synchronized 10 metre platform	October 23
Silver	Paige Rini	Water skiing	Women's overall	October 24
Silver	Coby Iwaasa; Samuel Murray	Racquetball	Men's doubles	October 24
Silver	Hunter Smith	Water skiing	Men's wakeboard	October 24
Silver	Collyn Gagne	Swimming	Men's 400 metre individual medley	October 24
Silver	Jayson Rampersad	Gymnastics	Men's pommel horse	October 24
Silver	Mary-Sophie Harvey	Swimming	Women's 200 metre individual medley	October 25
Silver	Mia Vallée; Pamela Ware	Diving	Women's synchronized 3 metre springboard	October 25
Silver	Nathan Zsombor-Murray	Diving	Men's 10 metre platform	October 25
Silver	Coby Iwaasa; Samuel Murray	Racquetball	Men's team	October 26
Silver	Melissa Humana-Paredes; Brandie Wilkerson	Beach volleyball	Women's tournament	October 27
Silver	Julien Frascadore	Judo	Men's 66 kg	October 28
Silver	Lois Betteridge	Canoeing	Women's slalom C-1	October 29
Silver	Isabelle Harris	Judo	Women's 63 kg	October 29
Silver	Alex Baldoni	Canoeing	Men's kayak cross	October 29
Silver	Lois Betteridge	Canoeing	Women's kayak cross	October 29
Silver	Sanoa Dempfle-Olin	Surfing	Women’s shortboard	October 30
Silver	Eleanor Harvey	Fencing	Women's individual foil	October 30
Silver	Charles Philibert-Thiboutot	Athletics	Men's 5000 metres	October 31
Silver	Mario Deslauriers; Tiffany Foster; Amy Millar; Beth Underhill	Equestrian	Team jumping	November 1
Silver	Hannah Taylor	Wrestling	Women's freestyle 57 kg	November 2
Silver	Fynn Fafard; Dylan French; Nicholas Zhang	Fencing	Men's team épée	November 2
Silver	Robert Heppenstall	Athletics	Men's 1500 metres	November 2
Silver	Mitch Hupé; François Lavoie	Bowling	Men's doubles	November 2
Silver	Sabrina Fang; Jessica Guo; Eleanor Harvey	Fencing	Women's team foil	November 2
Silver	Toshka Besharah; Natalie Davison; Riley Melanson; Courtney Stott	Canoeing	Women's K-4 500 metres	November 3
Silver	Mariah Millen; Alexandra ten Hove	Sailing	Women's 49erFX	November 3
Silver	George Crowne; Nicole Bunyan	Squash	Mixed doubles	November 3
Silver	Blake Broszus; Patrick Liu; Max Van Haaster	Fencing	Men's team foil	November 3
Silver	Pamela Brind’Amour; Tamar Gordon; Marissa Ponich	Fencing	Women's team sabre	November 3
Silver	Laurent Lavigne; Nick Matveev; Pierre-Luc Poulin; Simon McTavish	Canoeing	Men's K-4 500 metres	November 4
Silver	Rémi Aubin; Keegan Soehn	Gymnastics	Men's synchronized trampoline	November 4
Silver	Sarah Douglas	Sailing	Women's laser radial	November 4
Silver	Canada women's national rugby sevens team: Alysha Corrigan; Caroline Crossley; Chloe Daniels; Olivia De Couvreur; Asia Hogan-Rochester; Eden Kilgour; Piper Logan; Breanne Nicholas; Carissa Norsten; Lucie Romeo; Shalaya Valenzuela; Charity Williams	Rugby sevens	Women's tournament	November 4
Silver	Yamina Lahyanssa	Karate	Women's 50 kg	November 4
Silver	Canada women's national water polo team: Verica Bakoc; Serena Browne; Floranne Carroll; Axelle Crevier; Jessica Gaudreault; Daphne Guevremont; Rae Lekness; Elyse Lemay-Lavoie; Blaire McDowell; Hayley McKelvey; Kindred Paul; Clara Vulpisi; Emma Wright	Water polo	Women's tournament	November 4
Silver	Leonora MacKinnon; Alexanne Verret; Ruien Xiao	Fencing	Women's team épée	November 4
Silver	Alycia Butterworth	Athletics	Women's 3000 metres steeplechase	November 4
Silver	Hollie Naughton; Nicole Bunyan; Nikole Todd	Squash	Women's team	November 5
Silver	Mitch Hupé	Bowling	Men's singles	November 5
Silver	Edward Ly; Eugene Wang; Siméon Martin	Table tennis	Men's team	November 5
Bronze	Javier Acevedo; Stephen Calkins; Edouard Fullum-Huot; Finlay Knox; Jeremy Bagshaw; Blake Tierney	Swimming	Men's 4 × 100 metre freestyle relay	October 21
Bronze	Tae-Ku Park	Taekwondo	Men's 68 kg	October 21
Bronze	Caeli McKay	Diving	Women's 10 metre platform	October 21
Bronze	Hugh McNeil	Swimming	Men's 200 metre backstroke	October 22
Bronze	Javier Acevedo; Finlay Knox; Maggie Mac Neil; Mary-Sophie Harvey; Stephen Calkins; Edouard Fullum-Huot; Brooklyn Douthwright; Katerine Savard	Swimming	Mixed 4 × 100 metre freestyle relay	October 22
Bronze	Cassie Lee; Frédérique Sgarbossa; Ava Stewart; Aurélie Tran; Sydney Turner	Gymnastics	Women's artistic team all-around	October 22
Bronze	Alizee Brien; Shaye de Paiva; Kendra Hartley; Parker Illingworth	Rowing	Women's quadruple sculls	October 23
Bronze	Paige Rini	Water skiing	Women's slalom	October 23
Bronze	Paige Rini	Water skiing	Women's jump	October 23
Bronze	Marc-André Bergeron	Taekwondo	Men's +80 kg	October 23
Bronze	Beatrice Boucher; Camille Carier Bergeron; Mathilde Tétreault; Naïma Moreira-Laliberté	Equestrian	Team dressage	October 23
Bronze	Danielle Hanus	Swimming	Women's 100 metre backstroke	October 23
Bronze	Blake Tierney	Swimming	Men's 100 metre backstroke	October 23
Bronze	Julie Brousseau; Brooklyn Douthwright; Katerine Savard; Mary-Sophie Harvey; Emma O'Croinin; Sydney Pickrem	Swimming	Women's 4 × 200 metre freestyle relay	October 24
Bronze	Javier Acevedo; Alex Axon; Jeremy Bagshaw; Finlay Knox; Raben Dommann; Blake Tierney; Yu Tong Wu	Swimming	Men's 4 × 200 metre freestyle relay	October 24
Bronze	Jackie Boyle; Sarah Orban; Emy Savard	Cycling	Women's track team sprint	October 24
Bronze	Félix Dolci	Gymnastics	Men's rings	October 24
Bronze	Alannah Yip	Sport climbing	Women's boulder & lead	October 24
Bronze	Alizée Brien; Shaye de Paiva	Rowing	Women's double sculls	October 25
Bronze	Shannon Westlake	Shooting	Women's 50 metre rifle three positions	October 25
Bronze	Rachel Chan	Badminton	Women's singles	October 25
Bronze	Félix Dolci	Gymnastics	Men's vault	October 25
Bronze	Javier Acevedo; Finlay Knox; Gabe Mastromatteo; Blake Tierney; Edouard Fullum-Huot; Raben Dommann; Keir Ogilvie	Swimming	Men's 4 × 100 metre medley relay	October 25
Bronze	Ava Stewart	Gymnastics	Women's balance beam	October 25
Bronze	René Cournoyer	Gymnastics	Men's horizontal bar	October 25
Bronze	Bryan Colwell	Boxing	Men's 92 kg	October 26
Bronze	Junior Petanqui	Boxing	Men's 71 kg	October 26
Bronze	Kelly Fitzsimmons; Devan Wiebe	Modern pentathlon	Women's relay	October 26
Bronze	Mckenzie Wright	Boxing	Women's 50 kg	October 26
Bronze	Charlie Cavanagh	Boxing	Women's 66 kg	October 26
Bronze	Maël Rivard	Canoeing	Men's slalom K-1	October 29
Bronze	Lea Baldoni	Canoeing	Women's slalom K-1	October 29
Bronze	Lindsay Traisnel	Equestrian	Individual eventing	October 29
Bronze	Antoine Bouchard	Judo	Men's 73 kg	October 29
Bronze	David Popovici	Judo	Men's 81 kg	October 29
Bronze	Finn Spencer	Surfing	Men's stand up paddleboard	October 30
Bronze	Eugene Wang; Zhang Mo	Table tennis	Mixed doubles	October 30
Bronze	Jessica Guo	Fencing	Women's individual foil	October 30
Bronze	Zhang Mo	Table tennis	Women's singles	November 1
Bronze	Hollie Naughton	Squash	Women's singles	November 1
Bronze	Eugene Wang	Table tennis	Men's singles	November 1
Bronze	Nishan Randhawa	Wrestling	Men's freestyle 97 kg	November 1
Bronze	Ruien Xiao	Fencing	Women's épée	November 1
Bronze	Fares Arfa	Fencing	Men's sabre	November 1
Bronze	Shaul Gordon	Fencing	Men's sabre	November 1
Bronze	Adam Thomson	Wrestling	Men's freestyle 74 kg	November 1
Bronze	Kaila Butler	Athletics	Women's hammer throw	November 1
Bronze	Hunter Lee	Wrestling	Men's freestyle 86 kg	November 2
Bronze	Olivia Di Bacco	Wrestling	Women's freestyle 68 kg	November 2
Bronze	Julie-Anne Staehli	Athletics	Women's 5000 metres	November 2
Bronze	Sophia Jensen	Canoeing	Women's C-1 200 metres	November 3
Bronze	Justin Barnes; Will Jones	Sailing	Men's 49er	November 3
Bronze	Sydney Carroll; Scarlett Finn; Audrey Lamothe; Jonnie Newman; Raphaelle Plante; Kenzie Priddell; Claire Scheffel; Florence Tremblay; Olena Verbinska	Artistic swimming	Open team	November 3
Bronze	Claudia Laos-Loo	Karate	Women's individual kata	November 3
Bronze	Canada men's national field hockey team: Brenden Bissett; Fin Boothroyd; Sam Cabral; Taylor Curran; Sean Davis; Brendan Guraliuk; Thomson Harris; Gordon Johnston; James Kirkpatrick; Ethan McTavish; Devohn Noronha-Teixeira; Balraj Panesar; Keegan Pereira; Matthew Sarmento; Oliver Scholfield; Floris van Son	Field hockey	Men's tournament	November 3
Bronze	Connor Fitzpatrick	Canoeing	Men's C-1 1000 metres	November 4
Bronze	Courtney Stott; Madeline Schmidt	Canoeing	Women's K-2 500 metres	November 4
Bronze	Canada women's national softball team: Dawn Bodrug; Rylie Crane; Emma Entzminger; Larissa Franklin; Sara Groenewegen; Kelsey Harshman; Zoe Hicks; Kianna Jones; Janet Leung; Grace Messmer; Callum Pilgrim; Erika Polidori; Morgan Rackel; Morgan Reimer; Nicole Rivait; Natalie Wideman	Softball	Women's tournament	November 4
Bronze	Brock Hoel; Liam Donnelly; Dominika Jamnicky; Emy Legault	Triathlon	Mixed relay	November 4
Bronze	David Baillargeon; George Crowne; Graeme Schnell	Squash	Men's team	November 4
Bronze	Canada national rugby sevens team: Phil Berna; Jack Carson; Elias Ergas; Ethan Hager; Elias Hancock; Thomas Isherwood; Lockie Kratz; Matt Percillier; David Richard; Alex Russell; Kal Sager; Jake Thiel	Rugby sevens	Men's tournament	November 4
Bronze	Melissa Bratic	Karate	Women's 68 kg	November 5
Bronze	Alena Sharp	Golf	Women's individual	November 5

Medals by sport/discipline
Sport	1st place, gold medalist(s)	2nd place, silver medalist(s)	3rd place, bronze medalist(s)	Total
Swimming	11	6	8	**25**
Cycling	5	1	1	**7**
Canoeing	4	5	5	**14**
Athletics	4	3	2	**9**
Badminton	4	0	1	**5**
Gymnastics	3	3	5	**10**
Fencing	2	6	4	**12**
Diving	2	5	1	**8**
Boxing	2	0	4	**6**
Judo	1	2	2	**5**
Water skiing	1	6	2	**9**
Sailing	1	2	1	**4**
Equestrian	1	1	2	**4**
Rowing	1	1	2	**4**
Taekwondo	1	0	2	**3**
Shooting	1	0	1	**2**
Breaking	1	0	0	**1**
Roller sports	1	0	0	**1**
Squash	0	2	2	**4**
Bowling	0	2	0	**2**
Racquetball	0	2	0	**2**
Wrestling	0	1	4	**5**
Table tennis	0	1	3	**4**
Karate	0	1	2	**3**
Rugby sevens	0	1	1	**2**
Surfing	0	1	1	**2**
Beach volleyball	0	1	0	**1**
Water polo	0	1	0	**1**
Weightlifting	0	1	0	**1**
Artistic swimming	0	0	1	**1**
Field hockey	0	0	1	**1**
Golf	0	0	1	**1**
Modern pentathlon	0	0	1	**1**
Softball	0	0	1	**1**
Sport climbing	0	0	1	**1**
Triathlon	0	0	1	**1**
Total	46	55	63	164

Medals by day
**Day**	1st place, gold medalist(s)	2nd place, silver medalist(s)	3rd place, bronze medalist(s)	**Total**
21 October	4	2	3	9
22 October	5	4	3	12
23 October	3	9	7	19
24 October	8	5	5	18
25 October	8	3	7	18
26 October	1	1	5	7
27 October	3	1	0	4
28 October	0	1	0	1
29 October	1	4	5	10
30 October	2	2	3	7
31 October	0	1	0	1
1 November	0	1	9	10
2 November	2	5	3	10
3 November	3	5	5	13
4 November	6	8	6	20
5 November	0	3	2	5
Total	46	55	63	164

Medals by gender
**Day**	1st place, gold medalist(s)	2nd place, silver medalist(s)	3rd place, bronze medalist(s)	**Total**
Women	22	30	30	82
Men	22	22	27	71
Mixed/Open	2	3	7	11
Total	46	55	63	164

== Competitors ==
The following is the list of number of competitors (per gender) participating at the games per sport/discipline.

Sport	Men	Women	Total
Archery	5	3	8
Artistic swimming	0	9	9
Athletics (track and field)	11	13	24
Badminton	5	5	10
Beach volleyball	2	2	4
Bowling	2	0	2
Boxing	7	6	13
Breaking	2	2	4
Canoeing	11	12	23
Cycling	13	13	26
Diving	5	5	10
Equestrian	3	11	14
Fencing	9	9	18
Field hockey	16	16	32
Golf	2	2	4
Gymnastics	7	14	21
Handball	0	14	14
Judo	5	2	7
Karate	1	5	6
Modern pentathlon	2	3	5
Racquetball	2	2	4
Roller sports	2	2	4
Rowing	7	9	16
Rugby sevens	12	12	24
Sailing	7	8	15
Shooting	6	8	14
Softball	0	16	16
Sport climbing	6	4	10
Squash	3	3	6
Surfing	3	4	7
Swimming	20	16	36
Table tennis	3	3	6
Taekwondo	5	4	9
Tennis	1	1	2
Triathlon	3	3	6
Water polo*	13	13	26
Water skiing	2	4	6
Weightlifting	3	3	6
Wrestling	3	4	7
Total	212	268	480

- One alternate in each water polo team is not included in the overall count. Both alternates did end up competing for their respective teams.

== Archery ==
Canada qualified eight archers during the 2022 Pan American Archery Championships. The official team of eight athletes (five men and three women) was named on October 2, 2023.

Men

Athlete	Event	Ranking Round		Round of 32	Round of 16	Quarterfinals	Semifinals	Final / BM	Rank
Athlete	Event	Score	Seed	Opposition Score	Opposition Score	Opposition Score	Opposition Score	Opposition Score	Rank
Crispin Duenas	Individual recurve	667	10 Q	Xuereb (CAN); W 6–2	Rojas (MEX); L 0–6	Did not advance			
Eric Peters	Individual recurve	675	6 Q	Lopez (EAI); W 6–5	Santiesteban (CUB); L 2–6	Did not advance			
Brandon Xuereb	Individual recurve	648	23 Q	Duenas (CAN); L 2–6	Did not advance				
Andrew Fagan	Individual compound	700	10 Q	Arenas (COL); L 143–145	Did not advance				
Tristan Spicer-Moran	Individual compound	689	16 Q	Schaff (USA); L 148–149	Did not advance				
Crispin Duenas; Eric Peters; Brandon Xuereb	Team recurve	1990	5 Q	—N/a		Brazil; L 1–5	Did not advance		
Andrew Fagan; Tristan Spicer-Moran	Team compound	1389	6 Q	—N/a		El Salvador; L 153–158	Did not advance		

Women

Athlete	Event	Ranking Round		Round of 32	Round of 16	Quarterfinals	Semifinals	Final / BM	Rank
Athlete	Event	Score	Seed	Opposition Score	Opposition Score	Opposition Score	Opposition Score	Opposition Score	Rank
Stephanie Barrett	Individual recurve	623	14 Q	Espinoza (ECU); W 6–5	Ruiz (MEX); L 2–6	Did not advance			
Virginie Chénier	Individual recurve	645	7 Q	Paredes (CUB); W 7–1	Andrades (CHI); W 6–5	Kaufhold (USA); L 2–6	Did not advance		
Amelia Gagne	Individual recurve	582	27 Q	Machado (BRA); L 0–6	Did not advance				
Stephanie Barrett; Virginie Chénier; Amelia Gagne	Team recurve	1850	5	—N/a		Brazil; L 1–5	Did not advance		

Mixed

Athlete	Event	Ranking Round		Round of 16	Quarterfinals	Semifinals	Final / BM	Rank
Athlete	Event	Score	Seed	Opposition Score	Opposition Score	Opposition Score	Opposition Score	Rank
Eric Peters; Virginie Chénier	Team recurve	1320	5 Q	Puerto Rico; W 6–0	Colombia; L 2–6	Did not advance		

== Athletics (track and field) ==
Canada qualified 27 athletes (13 men and 14 women). The final team was named on September 21, 2023. Tatiana Aholou, Adam Keenan, Myles Misener-Daley and Grace Fetherstonhaugh were later withdrawn, while Kiana Gibson as added, making the final teams size 24 athletes (11 men and 13 women). Misener-Daley declined his invitation after confusion over selection and wanting to be ready for the 2024 Summer Olympics.

Key

- Note–Ranks given for track events are for the entire round
- Q = Qualified for the next round
- q = Qualified for the next round as a fastest loser or, in field events, by position without achieving the qualifying target
- NR = National record
- GR = Games record
- PB = Personal best
- NM = No mark
- N/A = Round not applicable for the event
- Bye = Athlete not required to compete in round

Track and road events

Men

Athlete	Event	Semifinals		Final	
Athlete	Event	Result	Rank	Result	Rank
Brandon Letts	100 m	10.51	10	Did not advance	
Norris Spike	100 m	10.51	11	Did not advance	
Jeremiah Lauzon	200 m	21.34	11	Did not advance	
Callum Robinson	200 m	21.16	7 Q	20.85	4
Zakary Mama-Yari	800 m	1:49.71	15	Did not advance	
Stephen Evans	800 m	1:48.98	11	Did not advance	
Robert Heppenstall	1500 m	—N/a		3:39.76	2nd place, silver medalist(s)
Charles Philibert-Thiboutot	1500 m	—N/a		3:39.74	1st place, gold medalist(s)
Charles Philibert-Thiboutot	5000 m	—N/a		14:48.02	2nd place, silver medalist(s)
Jean-Simon Desgagnés	3000 m steeplechase	—N/a		8:30.14	1st place, gold medalist(s)
Evan Dunfee	20 km walk	—N/a		1:22:14	9

Women

Athlete	Event	Semifinals		Final	
Athlete	Event	Result	Rank	Result	Rank
Grace Konrad	400 m	53.64	4 Q	52.10	4
Madeline Price	400 m	52.70	7 q	53.59	7
Addy Townsend	800 m	2:06.62	6 Q	2:09.02	8
Kate Current	1500 m	—N/a		4:16.65	7
Julie-Anne Staehli	5000 m	—N/a		16:06.75	3rd place, bronze medalist(s)
Brianna Scott	5000 m	—N/a		16:27.79	7
Alycia Butterworth	3000 m steeplechase	—N/a		9:40.86	2nd place, silver medalist(s)
Kiana Gibson	3000 m steeplechase	—N/a		9:53.51	5
Keira Christie-Galloway	100 m hurdles	13.36	6 Q	13.60	8

Field events

Athlete	Event	Final	
Athlete	Event	Distance	Position
Ethan Katzberg	Men's hammer throw	80.96 GR	1st place, gold medalist(s)
Kaila Butler	Women's hammer throw	65.10 m	3rd place, bronze medalist(s)
Rachel Hyink	Women's pole vault	4.20	5
Sarah Mitton	Women's shot put	19.19	1st place, gold medalist(s)

Combined events – Women's heptathlon

Athlete	Event	100H	HJ	SP	200 m	LJ	JT	800 m	Total	Rank
Georgia Ellenwood	Result	13.92	1.70	DNF					1845	9
Georgia Ellenwood	Points	990	855	DNF					1845	9

== Artistic swimming ==
Canada automatically qualified a full team of nine artistic swimmers. The team was officially named on September 19, 2023.

Athlete	Event	Technical Routine		Free Routine (Final)				Artistic Routine (Final)			
Athlete	Event	Points	Rank	Points	Rank	Total Points	Rank	Points	Rank	Total Points	Rank
Audrey Lamothe; Olena Verbinska	Women's duet	197.6000	5	163.6458	4	361.2458	5	—N/a			
Sydney Carroll; Scarlett Finn; Audrey Lamothe; Jonnie Newman; Raphaelle Plante; Kenzie Priddell; Claire Scheffel; Florence Tremblay; Olena Verbinska	Open team	233.2679	3	230.1042	3	—N/a		198.6800	3	662.0521	3rd place, bronze medalist(s)

== Badminton ==
Canada qualified a total of ten badminton athletes (five per gender). Canada qualified two athletes through the 2021 Junior Pan American Games in Cali, Colombia (Brian Yang and Rachel Chan). A further eight quotas were earned by Canadian athletes, by finishing first overall in the Pan American Games ranking. The official team of ten athletes (five per gender) was named on September 22, 2023.

Men

Athlete	Event	First round	Second round	Quarterfinal	Semifinal	Final / BM	
Athlete	Event	Opposition Result	Opposition Result	Opposition Result	Opposition Result	Opposition Result	Rank
Brian Yang	Singles	Bye	Opti (SUR); W 2–0 (21–8, 21–9)	Matias (BRA); W 2–0 (21–10, 21–12)	Canjura (ESA); W 2–0 (21–11, 21–10)	Cordon (EAI); W 2–0 (21–18, 21–6)	1st place, gold medalist(s)
Adam Dong; Nyl Yakura	Doubles	Bye	—N/a	Oliva / Otero (ARG); W 2–0 (21–13, 21–12)	Castillo / Montoya (MEX); W 2–1 (21–10, 21–23, 25–23)	Farias / Silva (BRA); W 2–1 (19–21, 21–15, 21–18)	1st place, gold medalist(s)
Kevin Lee; Ty Lindeman	Doubles	Bye	—N/a	Marroquín / Solís (EAI); L 1–2 (21–15, 10–21, 18–21)	Did not advance		

Women

Athlete	Event	First round	Second round	Third round	Quarterfinal	Semifinal	Final / BM	
Athlete	Event	Opposition Result	Opposition Result	Opposition Result	Opposition Result	Opposition Result	Opposition Result	Rank
Rachel Chan	Singles	Bye	Rodriguez (CUB); W 2–0 (21–5, 21–12)	Wynter (JAM); W 2–0 (21–5, 21–8)	Castillo (PER); W 2–0 (21–17, 21–10)	Zhang (USA); L 0–2 (16–21, 11–21)	Did not advance	3rd place, bronze medalist(s)
Eliana Zhang	Singles	Bye	Gualdi (ARG); W 2–0 (21–11, 21–8)	Vieira (BRA); W 2–0 (21–13, 22–20)	Gai (USA); L 0–2 (12–21, 18–21)	Did not advance		
Wen Yu Zhang	Singles	Bye	Jiménez (DOM); W 2–0 (21–12, 21–6)	Oropesa (CUB); L 1–2 (21–8, 16–21, 19–21)	Did not adavance			
Catherine Choi; Josephine Wu	Doubles	Chiong / Castillo (EAI); W 2–0 (21–3, 21–3)	—N/a		Castillo / Regal (PER); W 2–0 (21–9, 21–9)	Fregoso / Rodríguez (MEX); W 2–0 (21–10, 21–7)	Xu / Xu (USA); W 2–1 (21–18, 10–21, 21–17)	1st place, gold medalist(s)
Eliana Zhang; Wen Yu Zhang	Doubles	Acosta / Jiménez (DOM); W 2–0 (21–10, 21–11)	—N/a		Lima / Vieira (BRA); L 1–2 (9–21, 21–19, 18–21)	Did not advance		

Mixed

Athlete	Event	First round	Second round	Quarterfinal	Semifinal	Final / BM	
Athlete	Event	Opposition Result	Opposition Result	Opposition Result	Opposition Result	Opposition Result	Rank
Ty Lindeman; Josephine Wu	Doubles	Bye	Garrido / Fregoso (MEX); W 2–0 (21–7, 21–11)	Medel / Diaz (CHI); W 2–0 (21–5, 21–7)	Guevara / Castillo (PER); W 2–0 (21–10, 21–11)	Chiu / Gai (USA); W 2–1 (17–21, 21–17, 21–19)	1st place, gold medalist(s)

== Beach volleyball ==
Canada qualified four beach volleyball athletes (one pair per gender), by being ranked in the top three of the FIVB Beach World rankings as of June 30, 2023. The team was officially named on September 20, 2023.

Athletes	Event	Preliminary round				Round of 16	Quarterfinals	Semifinals	Finals	Rank
Athletes	Event	Opposition Score	Opposition Score	Opposition Score	Rank	Opposition Score	Opposition Score	Opposition Score	Opposition Score	Rank
Jake MacNeil; Alex Russell	Men's tournament	Leon / Tenorio (ECU); L 0–2 (18–21, 20–22)	Dyner / Varela (CRC); W 2–0 (21–11, 21–14)	N. Capogrosso / T. Capogrosso (ARG); L 0–2 (14–21, 12–22)	3 Q	Hannibal / Llambias (URU); W 2–0 (21–14, 21–16)	E. Grimalt / M. Grimalt (CHI); L 0–2 (21–32, 18–21)	5th–8th semifinals N. Capogrosso / T. Capogrosso (ARG); W 2–0 (21–15, 21–17)	Fifth place match Sarabia / Virgen (MEX); W 2–0 INJ (21–0, 21–0)	5
Melissa Humana-Paredes; Brandie Wilkerson	Women's tournament	Acuña / Bianchi (URU); W 2–0 (21–11, 21–6)	Almánzar / Payano (DOM); W 2–0 (21–11, 21–11)	Mongelos / Valiente (PAR); W 2–0 (21–13, 21–8)	1 Q	Bye	Navas / Gonazalez (PUR); W 2–0 (21–11, 21–14)	Gallay / Perera (ARG); W 2–0 (21–15, 21–15)	Lisboa / Ramos (BRA); L 0–2 (20–22, 18–21)	2nd place, silver medalist(s)

== Bowling ==
Canada qualified two men through the 2022 PABCON Champion of Champions held in Rio de Janeiro, Brazil. The team of two bowlers was officially named on September 5, 2023.

Athlete	Event	Qualification / Final																		Semifinal	Final / BM	
Athlete	Event	1	2	3	4	5	6	7	8	9	10	11	12	13	14	15	16	Total	Rank	Opposition Result	Opposition Result	Rank
Mitch Hupé	Men's singles	251	214	270	254	289	221	263	195	211	229	238	198	241	200	174	202	3650	1 Q	Azcona (PUR); W 673–665	Johnson (USA); L 727–795	2nd place, silver medalist(s)
François Lavoie	Men's singles	246	206	246	202	277	194	192	180	202	215	268	171	186	195	222	208	3410	7	Did not advance		
Mitch Hupé; François Lavoie	Men's doubles	156; 237	186; 212	267; 277	223; 222	192; 197	222; 222	212; 192	189; 229	—N/a								3435	2nd place, silver medalist(s)	—N/a		

== Boxing ==
Canada qualified 12 boxers through the Pan American Qualification tournament. Since the boxing tournament was open entry due to its status as an Olympic qualifier, Boxing Canada entered boxers in all 13 events. The full team of 13 boxers (seven men and six women) was officially named on September 14, 2023.

Men

Athlete	Event	Round of 32	Round of 16	Quarterfinal	Semifinal	Final	
Athlete	Event	Opposition Result	Opposition Result	Opposition Result	Opposition Result	Opposition Result	Rank
Justin Parina	–51 kg	—N/a	Alcantara (DOM); L 0–5	Did not advance			
Victor Tremblay	–57 kg	—N/a	Oliveira (BRA); L RSC R2	Did not advance			
Wyatt Sanford	–63.5 kg	Bye	Álvarez (CUB); W 5–0	Amaya (ARG); W 5–0	Falcão (BRA); W 5–0	Martínez (MEX); W 5–0	1st place, gold medalist(s)
Junior Petanqui	–71 kg	—N/a	Prince (TTO); W 5–0	Palacio (VEN); W 4–1	Rodríguez (ECU); L 0–4	Did not advance	3rd place, bronze medalist(s)
Keven Beausejour	–80 kg	—N/a	Álamos (CHI); W 3–2	Buonarrigo (ARG); L 1–4	Did not advance		
Bryan Colwell	–92 kg	—N/a	Bye	Aska (ANT); W 3–2	Machado (BRA); L WDR	Did not advance	3rd place, bronze medalist(s)
Jérôme Feujio	+92 kg	—N/a	Bye	Arzola (CUB); L 0–5	Did not advance		

Women

Athlete	Event	Round of 16	Quarterfinal	Semifinal	Final	
Athlete	Event	Opposition Result	Opposition Result	Opposition Result	Opposition Result	Rank
McKenzie Wright	–50 kg	Jamez (EAI); W 3–2	Cárdenas (CRC); W 5–0	Lozano (USA); L 0–5	Did not advance	3rd place, bronze medalist(s)
Scarlett Delgado	–54 kg	Bye	Bravo (CHI); L 2–3	Did not advance		
Marie Al-Ahmadieh	–57 kg	Mendoza (USA); W 3–2	Lozada (PUR); L 0–5	Did not advance		
Garinder Takhar	–60 kg	Gonzalez (USA); L RSC R1	Did not advance			
Charlie Cavanagh	–66 kg	Bye	Pérez (ARG); W 5–0	McCane (USA); L 0–5	Did not advance	3rd place, bronze medalist(s)
Tammara Thibeault	–75 kg	Jiménez (DOM); W RSC R1	Yriza (VEN); W 5–0	Ortiz (MEX); W 5–0	Bylon (PAN); W 5–0	1st place, gold medalist(s)

== Breaking ==
Canada qualified four break-dancers (two per gender). The official team of four athletes was named on August 25, 2023.

Athlete	Nickname	Event	Round robin				Quarterfinal	Semifinal	Final / BM	
Athlete	Nickname	Event	Opposition Result	Opposition Result	Opposition Result	Rank	Opposition Result	Opposition Result	Opposition Result	Rank
Onton See	Onton	B-Boys	Phil Wizard (CAN); L 0–2	Choky (PUR); W 2–0	Matita (CHI); D 1–1	3	Did not advance			
Philip Kim	Phil Wizard	B-Boys	Onton (CAN); W 2–0	Matita (CHI); W 2–0	Choky (PUR); W 2–0	1 Q	Leony (BRA); W 2–0	Gravity (USA); W 3–0	Jeffro (USA); W 3–0	1st place, gold medalist(s)
Emma Misak	Emma	B-Girls	Tiff (CAN); L 0–2	Lakshmi Hop (ECU); W 2–0	Tiara (PER); W 2–0	2 Q	Luma (COL); L 0–2	Did not advance		
Tiffany Leung	Tiff	B-Girls	Emma (CAN); W 2–0	Tiara (PER); W 2–0	Lakshmi Hop (ECU); W 2–0	1 Q	Isis (ECU); W 2–1	Sunny (USA); W 0–3	Bronze medal final La Vix (USA); L 0–3	4

== Canoeing ==
=== Slalom ===
Canada qualified a total of three slalom athletes (one man and two women). After reallocations, Canada earned two additional quotas (one man and one woman) for a total of five spots (two men and three women). The team was officially named on June 28, 2023.

Athlete	Event	Heats			Semifinal		Final	
Athlete	Event	Run 1	Run 2	Rank	Time	Rank	Time	Rank
Alex Baldoni	Men's C-1	87.67	84.66	3 Q	115.92	4 Q	118.49	5
Maël Rivard	Men's K-1	79.90	80.52	4 Q	99.97	4 Q	99.56	3rd place, bronze medalist(s)
Lois Betteridge	Women's C-1	91.94	101.04	2 Q	122.18	1 Q	119.69	2nd place, silver medalist(s)
Léa Baldoni	Women's K-1	88.34	87.14	3 Q	108.78	3 Q	116.06	3rd place, bronze medalist(s)

Kayak cross

Athlete	Event	Time trial		Repechage	Semifinal	Final
Athlete	Event	Time	Rank	Rank	Rank	Rank
Alex Baldoni	Men's	49.74	1 Q	Bye	1 Q	2nd place, silver medalist(s)
Maël Rivard	Men's	51.46	4	Did not advance		
Léa Baldoni	Women's	55.51	4	Did not advance		
Lois Betteridge	Women's	54.02	3 Q	Bye	2 Q	2nd place, silver medalist(s)
Florence Maheu	Women's	56.11	7	Did not advance		

- Only one per country could advance to the next round.

=== Sprint ===
Canada qualified a total of 18 sprint athletes (nine men and nine women). The final team of 18 athletes (nine per gender) was named on September 28, 2023.

Men

Athlete	Event	Heat		Semifinal		Final	
Athlete	Event	Time	Rank	Time	Rank	Time	Rank
Connor Fitzpatrick	C-1 1000 m	4:06.66	1 FA	Bye		3:55.13	3rd place, bronze medalist(s)
Alix Plomteux; Craig Spence	C-2 500 m	—N/a				1:42.12	1st place, gold medalist(s)
Cameron Low	K-1 1000 m	3:46.44	3 SF	3:47.13	1 FA	3:44.69	6
Ian Gaudet; Simon McTavish	K-2 500 m	1:32.50	1 Q	Bye		1:30.45	1st place, gold medalist(s)
Laurent Lavigne; Nick Matveev; Pierre-Luc Poulin; Simon McTavish	K-4 500 m	—N/a				1:21.28	2nd place, silver medalist(s)

Women

Athlete	Event	Heat		Semifinal		Final	
Athlete	Event	Time	Rank	Time	Rank	Time	Rank
Sophia Jensen	C-1 200 m	47.13	1 FA	Bye		46.87	3rd place, bronze medalist(s)
Sloan MacKenzie; Katie Vincent	C-2 500 m	—N/a				1:54.26	1st place, gold medalist(s)
Michelle Russell	K-1 500 m	1:51.32	1 FA	Bye		1:51.25	1st place, gold medalist(s)
Madeline Schmidt; Courtney Stott	K-2 500 m	1:46.19	2 FA	Bye		1:42.84	3rd place, bronze medalist(s)
Toshka Besharah; Natalie Davison; Riley Melanson; Courtney Stott	K-4 500 m	—N/a				1:35.91	2nd place, silver medalist(s)

== Cycling ==
Canada qualified a total of 30 cyclists (15 men and 15 women). A final team of 26 cyclists were named to the team (13 per gender).

=== BMX ===
Canada qualified four BMX racers (two men and two women) through the UCI World Rankings.

Racing

Athlete	Event	Seeding round		Quarterfinal		Semifinal		Final	
Athlete	Event	Time	Rank	Points	Rank	Time	Rank	Time	Rank
Curtis Krey	Men's	33.310	14 Q	11	4 Q	16	6	Did not advance	
Ryan Tougas	Men's	33.120	10 Q	10	4 Q	15	5	Did not advance	
Teigen Pascual	Women's	37.180	8 Q	10	3 Q	14	5	Did not advance	
Molly Simpson	Women's	35.880	3 Q	5	2 Q	9	3 Q	36.000	2nd place, silver medalist(s)

=== Mountain biking ===
Canada qualified four mountain bikers at the 2023 Pan American Championships.

Athlete	Event	Time	Rank
Gunnar Holmgren	Men's cross-country	1:17:59	1st place, gold medalist(s)
Carter Woods	Men's cross-country	DNF	
Jennifer Jackson	Women's cross-country	1:20:35	1st place, gold medalist(s)
Sandra Walter	Women's cross-country	1:30:48	7

=== Road ===
Canada qualified four road cyclists (two per gender) at the Pan American Championships. Some cyclists will compete in both the road and track disciplines.

Athlete	Event	Time	Rank
Chris Ernst	Men's road race	3:46:24	17
Carson Mattern	Men's road race	DNF	
Campbell Parrish	Men's road race	3:48:30	=26
Riley Pickrell	Men's road race	3:41:08	8
Chris Ernst	Men's road time trial	49:47.37	10
Campbell Parrish	Men's road time trial	50:08.45	13
Ngaire Barraclough	Women's road race	DNS	
Devaney Collier	Women's road race	DNF	
Adèle Normand	Women's road race	2:53:38	13
Ruby West	Women's road race	3:00:22	21
Ngaire Barraclough	Women's road time trial	27:11.65	6
Ruby West	Women's road time trial	28:12.65	12

=== Track ===
Canada qualified a team of 18 track cyclists (nine men and nine women). A team of 16 was named (eight per gender, with some also competing in the road events). On October 12, 2023, it was announced Erin Attwell was replaced by Kiara Lylyk.

Sprint

Athlete	Event	Qualification		Round of 16	Repechage 1	Quarterfinals	Semifinals	Cl.	Final / BM	
Athlete	Event	Time	Rank	Opposition Time	Opposition Time	Opposition Result	Opposition Result	Rank	Opposition Result	Rank
Tyler Rorke	Men's individual	9.909	7 Q	Ortega (COL); W 10.293	Bye	Tjon En Fa (SUR); L	Did not advance	3	Did not advance	7
Nick Wammes	Men's individual	9.689	2 Q	Browne (TTO); W 10.349	Bye	Verdugo (MEX); W 9.869 / 10.187	Tjon En Fa (SUR); L	Bye	Bronze medal final Quintero (COL); L	4
Sarah Orban	Women's individual	10.790	2 Q	Quintero (CHI); L	Salazar (COL); Vera (ARG); W 11.489	Bayona (COL); L	Did not advance	2	Did not advance	6
Emy Savard	Women's individual	11.454	13	Did not advance						
James Hedgcock; Tyler Rorke; Nick Wammes	Men's team	43.829	1 QG	—N/a					Colombia; W 43.396–43.421	1st place, gold medalist(s)
Jackie Boyle; Sarah Orban; Emy Savard	Women's team	49.110	3 QB	—N/a					Bronze medal final Colombia; W 48.498–48.836	3rd place, bronze medalist(s)

Pursuit

Athlete	Event	Qualification		Round 1	Finals	
Athlete	Event	Time	Rank	Opposition Result	Opposition Result	Rank
Michael Foley; Carson Mattern; Sean Richardson; Campbell Parrish; Chris Ernst*	Men's team	3:55.981	1	Argentina; L OVL	Colombia; W 3:53.593–4:02.310	1st place, gold medalist(s)
Devaney Collier; Kiara Lylyk; Fiona Majendie; Ruby West	Women's team	4:28.540	1	United States; W 4:22.246–4:26.425	Mexico; W 4:23.000–4:30.000	1st place, gold medalist(s)

- Ernst competed in the qualification round and received a medal

Keirin

Athlete	Event	Heats	Final
Athlete	Event	Rank	Rank
James Hedgcock	Men's	2 FA	4
Jackie Boyle	Women's	DNF	Did not advance

Madison

Athlete	Event	Points	Rank
Chris Ernst; Michael Foley	Men's	33	5
Ngaire Barraclough; Devaney Collier	Women's	DNF	

Omnium

Athlete	Event	Scratch race		Tempo race		Elimination race		Points race		Total	
Athlete	Event	Points	Rank	Points	Rank	Points	Rank	Points	Rank	Points	Rank
Michael Foley	Men's	34	4	26	8	38	2	16	=4	114	5
Devaney Collier	Women's	24	9	20	11	34	4	33	2	111	5

== Diving ==
Canada qualified nine divers (four men and five women). The team was officially named on August 22, 2023. Benjamin Tessier was later added to the team, bringing the team size to ten divers (five per gender), but ultimately did not compete.

Men

Athlete	Event	Preliminary		Final	
Athlete	Event	Points	Rank	Points	Rank
Thomas Ciprick	1 m springboard	327.60	9 Q	DNS	
Thomas Ciprick	3 m springboard	304.80	17	Did not advance	
Bryden Hattie	3 m springboard	356.70	10 Q	377.15	10
Rylan Wiens	10 m platform	367.65	7 Q	449.15	4
Nathan Zsombor-Murray	10 m platform	422.40	3 Q	476.15	2nd place, silver medalist(s)
Rylan Wiens; Nathan Zsombor-Murray	10 m synchronized platform	—N/a		404.04	2nd place, silver medalist(s)

Women

Athlete	Event	Preliminary		Final	
Athlete	Event	Points	Rank	Points	Rank
Mia Vallée	1 m springboard	274.90	1 Q	272.30	2nd place, silver medalist(s)
Pamela Ware	1 m springboard	259.95	3 Q	280.25	1st place, gold medalist(s)
Mia Vallée	3 m springboard	300.10	4 Q	292.85	6
Pamela Ware	3 m springboard	285.45	5 Q	342.75	1st place, gold medalist(s)
Caeli McKay	10 m platform	343.95	1 Q	335.65	3rd place, bronze medalist(s)
Celina Toth	10 m platform	251.80	11 Q	247.75	11
Mia Vallée; Pamela Ware	3 m synchronized springboard	—N/a		280.65	2nd place, silver medalist(s)
Caeli McKay; Kate Miller	10 m synchronized platform	—N/a		310.29	2nd place, silver medalist(s)

== Equestrian ==
Canada qualified a full team of four riders in dressage, eventing and show-jumping based on FEI world rankings released on September 11, 2023. The official team of 12 equestrians (three men and nine women) was named on October 4, 2023.

=== Dressage ===
Athlete	Horse	Event	Qualification						Grand Prix Freestyle / Intermediate I Freestyle	
Athlete	Horse	Event	Grand Prix / Prix St. Georges		Grand Prix Special / Intermediate I		Total		Grand Prix Freestyle / Intermediate I Freestyle	
Athlete	Horse	Event	Score	Rank	Score	Rank	Score	Rank	Score	Rank
Beatrice Boucher	Summerwood’s Limei	Individual	71.147	11	70.471	14	—N/a		Did not advance	
Camille Carier Bergeron	Sound of Silence 4	Individual	67.565	20	74.511	6 Q	—N/a		78.915	7
Naïma Moreira-Laliberté	Statesman	Individual	72.739	9	72.021	10 Q	—N/a		77.130	10
Mathilde Tétreault	Fedor	Individual	70.391	12	71.128	12 Q	—N/a		74.195	12
Beatrice Boucher; Camille Carier Bergeron; Naïma Moreira-Laliberté; Mathilde Blais Tétreault	See above	Team	214.276	3	217.670	3	431.937	3rd place, bronze medalist(s)	—N/a	

=== Eventing ===
Athlete	Horse	Event	Dressage		Cross-country			Jumping			Total	
Athlete	Horse	Event	Penalties	Rank	Penalties	Total	Rank	Penalties	Total	Rank	Penalties	Rank
Colleen Loach	FE Golden Eye	Individual	28.6	4	13.2	41.8	11	0	41.8	6	41.8	6
Karl Slezak	Hot Bobo	Individual	32.7	8	0	32.7	6	8	40.7	4	40.7	4
Lindsay Traisnel	Bacyrouge	Individual	32.6	7	0	32.3	5	1.6	34.2	3	34.2	3rd place, bronze medalist(s)
Michael Winter	El Mundo	Individual	32.3	6	7.6	39.9	10	0.8	40.7	5	40.7	5
Colleen Loach; Karl Slezak; Lindsay Traisnel; Michael Winter	See above	Team	93.5	2	11.7	105.2	3	10.4	115.6	1	115.6	1st place, gold medalist(s)

=== Jumping ===
Athlete	Horse	Event	Qualification									Final					
Athlete	Horse	Event	Round 1			Round 2–1		Round 2–2		Total		Round A		Round B		Total	
Athlete	Horse	Event	Time	Faults	Rank	Faults	Rank	Faults	Rank	Faults	Rank	Faults	Rank	Faults	Rank	Faults	Rank
Mario Deslauriers	Emerson	Individual	80.65	3.89	12	4	=9	=4	=15	11.89	15	Did not advance					
Tiffany Foster	Figor	Individual	81.68	4.40	17	0	=1	0	=1	4.40	5 Q	12	=18	10	17	26.40	14
Amy Millar	Truman	Individual	76.29	1.71	5	4	=9	0	=1	5.71	9 Q	8	=10	4	=2	17.71	6
Beth Underhill	Nikka vd Bisschop	Individual	80.91	4.02	13	4	=9	0	=1	8.02	11 Q	9	=15	4	=2	17.71	9
Mario Deslauriers; Tiffany Foster; Amy Millar; Beth Underhill	See above	Team	—N/a	9.62	3	8	3	0	=1	17.62	2nd place, silver medalist(s)	—N/a					

== Fencing ==
Canada qualified a full team of 18 fencers (nine men and nine women), after all six teams finished at least in the top seven at the 2022 Pan American Fencing Championships in Ascuncion, Paraguay. The official team was named on September 6, 2023. On October 12, 2023, it was announced Bogdan Hamilton was replaced by Patrick Liu.

Individual

Men

Athlete	Event	Pool Round		Round of 16	Quarterfinals	Semifinals	Final	
Athlete	Event	Victories	Seed	Opposition Score	Opposition Score	Opposition Score	Opposition Score	Rank
Dylan French	Épée	4V–2D	3 Q	Arce (CUB); W 15–10	Bustos (CHI); W 15–11	Limardo (VEN); W 15–5	Núñez (CHI); W 15–12	1st place, gold medalist(s)
Nicolas Zhang	Épée	2V–4D	13 Q	Camargo (BRA); L 8–15	Did not advance			
Blake Broszus	Foil	3V–2D	6 Q	Leal (VEN); W 15–11	Chamley-Watson (USA); L 12–15	Did not advance		
Patrick Liu	Foil	2V–3D	10 Q	Cervantes (MEX); L 5–15	Did not advance			
Fares Arfa	Sabre	6V–0D	1 Q	Romo (MEX); W 15–8	Di Tella (ARG); W 15–12	Romero (VEN); L 12–15	Did not advance	3rd place, bronze medalist(s)
Shaul Gordon	Sabre	4V–2D	3 Q	Huapaya (PER); W 15–11	Cuellar (COL); W 15–10	Doddo (USA); L 8–15	Did not advance	3rd place, bronze medalist(s)

Women

Athlete	Event	Pool Round		Round of 16	Quarterfinals	Semifinals	Final	
Athlete	Event	Victories	Seed	Opposition Score	Opposition Score	Opposition Score	Opposition Score	Rank
Alexanne Verret	Épée	3V–2D	7 Q	Englert (ARG); W 15–9	Xiao (CAN); L 9–15	Did not advance		
Ruien Xiao	Épée	5V–0D	2 Q	Martinez (VEN); W 15–10	Verret (CAN); W 15–9	Doig (PER); L 10–15	Did not advance	3rd place, bronze medalist(s)
Eleanor Harvey	Foil	5V–0D	1 Q	Ondarts (ARG); W 15–7	Hernandez (MEX); W 11–6	Nelz (BRA); W 14–4	Kiefer (USA); L 7–15	2nd place, silver medalist(s)
Jessica Guo	Foil	4V–1D	6 Q	Padua (PUR); W 15–5	Dubrovich (USA); W 15–8	Kiefer (USA); L 8–15	Did not advance	3rd place, bronze medalist(s)
Pamela Brind’Amour	Sabre	3V–2D	6 Q	Espinosa (ARG); W 15–12	Skarbonkiewicz (USA); L 6–15	Did not advance		
Tamar Gordon	Sabre	5V–0D	2 Q	Paredes (VEN); W 15–6	Veranes (CUB); L 11–15	Did not advance		

Team

Athlete	Event	Quarterfinals	Semifinals	Final / BM / PM	
Athlete	Event	Opposition Score	Opposition Score	Opposition Score	Rank
Fynn Fafard; Dylan French; Nicholas Zhang	Men's épée	Cuba; W 45–41	Argentina; W 45–30	United States; L 41–42	2nd place, silver medalist(s)
Blake Broszus; Patrick Liu; Max Van Haaster	Men's foil	Colombia; W 45–13	Brazil; W 45–41	United States; L 19–45	2nd place, silver medalist(s)
Fares Arfa; François Cauchon; Shaul Gordon	Men's sabre	Mexico; W 45–40	Colombia; W 45–44	United States; W 45–38	1st place, gold medalist(s)
Leonora MacKinnon; Alexanne Verret; Ruien Xiao	Women's épée	Costa Rica; W 45–25	Mexico; W 45–31	Brazil; L 40–45	2nd place, silver medalist(s)
Sabrina Fang; Jessica Guo; Eleanor Harvey	Women's foil	Colombia; W 45–25	Mexico; W 45–26	United States; L 33–44	2nd place, silver medalist(s)
Pamela Brind’Amour; Tamar Gordon; Marissa Ponich	Women's sabre	Colombia; W 45–26	Mexico; W 45–39	United States; L 29–45	2nd place, silver medalist(s)

== Field hockey ==
Key:

- P – Match decided by penalty-shootout.

Summary

Team	Event	Group stage				Semifinal	Final / BM / Pl.	
Team	Event	Opposition Result	Opposition Result	Opposition Result	Rank	Opposition Result	Opposition Result	Rank
Canada men	Men's tournament	Brazil; W 2–0	United States; W 2–1	Trinidad and Tobago; W 4–0	1 Q	Chile; L 1–1; 2–3^{P}	Bronze medal match United States; W 3–2	3rd place, bronze medalist(s)
Canada women	Women's tournament	Cuba; W 7–1	Chile; L 0–2	Mexico; W 5–0	2 Q	Argentina; L 0–3	Bronze medal match Chile; L 0–2	4

=== Men's tournament ===
Canada qualified a men's team (of 16 athletes) by finishing 3rd at the 2022 Pan American Cup.

Roster

The team roster of 16 athletes was named on September 26, 2023.

- Brenden Bissett
- Fin Boothroyd
- Sam Cabral
- Taylor Curran
- Sean Davis
- Brendan Guraliuk
- Thomson Harris
- Gordon Johnston
- James Kirkpatrick
- Ethan McTavish
- Devohn Noronha-Teixeira
- Balraj Panesar
- Keegan Pereira
- Matthew Sarmento
- Oliver Scholfield
- Floris van Son

Preliminary round

Pos	Team	Pld	W	D	L	GF	GA	GD	Pts	Qualification
1	Canada	3	3	0	0	8	1	+7	9	Semi-finals
2	United States	3	2	0	1	12	4	+8	6	Semi-finals
3	Brazil	3	1	0	2	3	8	−5	3	5th–8th classification
4	Trinidad and Tobago	3	0	0	3	2	12	−10	0	5th–8th classification

Source: FIH
Rules for classification: 1) points; 2) matches won; 3) goal difference; 4) goals for; 5) head-to-head result; 6) field goals for.

25 October 2023
09:30

Canada	2–0	Brazil
Johnston 19'; Scholfield 41'	Report

Umpires:
Federico Silva (ARG)
Jonathan Altamirano (MEX)

27 October 2023
11:30

United States	1–2	Canada
A. Käppeler 10'	Report	Van Son 28'; Johnston 41'

Umpires:
Gabriel Labate (ARG)
Ilanggo Kanabathu (MAS)

29 October 2023
09:30

Canada	4–0	Trinidad and Tobago
Sarmiento 7'; Davis 30'; Johnston 31'; Kirkpatrick 44'	Report

Umpires:
Guillermo Poblete Luna (CHI)
Fabián Romero (PAR)

Semifinals

1 November 2023
20:15

Canada	1–1	Chile
Johnston 25'	Report	Becerra 52'
Penalties
Johnston (penalty shoot-out missed); Panesar (penalty shoot-out missed); Van Son (penalty shoot-out scored); Pereira (penalty shoot-out scored); Guraliuk (penalty shoot-out missed)	2–3	(penalty shoot-out scored) Hurtado; (penalty shoot-out missed) Rodríguez; (penalty shoot-out scored) Becerra; (penalty shoot-out missed) Gesswein; (penalty shoot-out scored) Amoroso

Umpires:
Gabriel Labate (ARG)
Benjamin Peters (USA)

Bronze medal match

3 November 2023
17:30

United States	2–3	Canada (bronze)
De Angelis 29'; A. Käppeler 54'	Report	Guraliuk 11'; Boothroyd 39'; Scholfield 51'

Umpires:
Gabriel Labate (ARG)
Federico Silva (ARG)

=== Women's tournament ===
Canada qualified a women's team (of 16 athletes) by finishing 3rd at the 2022 Pan American Cup.

Roster

The team roster of 16 athletes was named on September 26, 2023.

- Jordyn Faiczak
- Kenzie Girgis
- Sara Goodman
- Rowan Harris
- Karli Johansen
- Kathleen Leahy
- Sam McCrory
- Sara McManus
- Anna Mollenhauer
- Thora Rae
- Audrey Sawers
- Melanie Scholz
- Natalie Sourisseau
- Madison Thompson
- Chloe Walton
- Elise Wong

Preliminary round

Pos	Team	Pld	W	D	L	GF	GA	GD	Pts	Qualification
1	Chile (H)	3	3	0	0	14	0	+14	9	Semi-finals
2	Canada	3	2	0	1	12	3	+9	6	Semi-finals
3	Cuba	3	0	1	2	2	10	−8	1	5th–8th classification
4	Mexico	3	0	1	2	1	16	−15	1	5th–8th classification

Source: FIH
Rules for classification: 1) points; 2) matches won; 3) goal difference; 4) goals for; 5) head-to-head result; 6) field goals for.
(H) Hosts

26 October 2023
17:30

Canada	7–1	Cuba
Thompson 3', 23', 60'; Walton 9', 39'; Rae 30', 46'	Report	Vera 54'

Umpires:
Maggie Giddens (USA)
Ana Vázquez Escalanté (MEX)

28 October 2023
19:30

Canada	0–2	Chile
	Report	Caram 43'; Müller 44'

Umpires:
Maggie Giddens (USA)
Victoria Pazos (ARG)

30 October 2023
11:30

Mexico	0–5	Canada
	Report	Johansen 13', 33', 56'; McManus 19'; Sawers 39'

Umpires:
Ayanna McClean (TTO)
Claudia Montino (CHI)

Semifinals

2 November 2023
17:30

Argentina	3–0	Canada
Thome 26'; Jankunas 28'; Raposo 44'	Report

Umpires:
Maggie Giddens (USA)
Ana Vázquez Escalanté (MEX)

Bronze medal match

4 November 2023
17:30

Canada	0–2	Chile
	Report	Rojas 2', 46'

Umpires:
Maggie Giddens (USA)
Ayanna McClean (TTO)

== Golf ==
Canada qualified a full team of four golfers (two men and two women). The team was officially announced on September 26, 2023.

Athlete	Event	Round 1	Round 2	Round 3	Round 4	Total		
Athlete	Event	Score	Score	Score	Score	Score	Par	Rank
Myles Creighton	Men's individual	73	68	70	69	280	–8	=11
Étienne Papineau	Men's individual	63	71	67	71	272	–16	=4
Selena Costabile	Women's individual	77	76	74	75	302	+14	=18
Alena Sharp	Women's individual	67	73	70	71	281	–7	3rd place, bronze medalist(s)

== Gymnastics ==
Canada's team of 21 gymnasts (seven men and 14 women) was officially named on September 27, 2023.

=== Artistic ===
Canada qualified a team of ten gymnasts in artistic (five men and five women) at the 2023 Pan American Championships.

Men

Team & Individual Qualification

Athlete	Event	Apparatus						Total	
Athlete	Event	F	PH	R	V	PB	HB	Score	Rank
Zachary Clay	Team	—N/a	13.966 Q	13.033	—N/a	13.833 Q	12.600	—N/a	
René Cournoyer	Team	13.733 Q	—N/a	13.800 Q	14.166	13.033	13.500 Q	—N/a	
Félix Dolci	Team	14.266 Q	12.000	13.800 Q	14.400 Q	13.400	12.766	80.632	7 Q
William Émard	Team	12.966	12.400	13.666	14.633	13.866 Q	13.300 Q	80.831	6 Q
Jayson Rampersad	Team	13.033	14.266 Q	—N/a					
Total	Team	41.032	40.632	41.266	43.199	41.099	39.566	246.794	2nd place, silver medalist(s)

Qualification Legend: Q = Qualified to apparatus final

Individual Finals

Athlete	Event	Apparatus						Total	
Athlete	Event	F	PH	R	PB	V	HB	Score	Rank
Félix Dolci	All-around	14.566	12.333	14.033	14.400	14.366	12.833	82.531	1st place, gold medalist(s)
William Émard	All-around	14.400	12.333	13.733	14.366	11.766	9.066	75.664	16
René Cournoyer	Floor	12.433	—N/a					12.433	7
Félix Dolci	Floor	14.233	—N/a					14.233	1st place, gold medalist(s)
Zachary Clay	Pommel horse	—N/a	14.400	—N/a				14.400	1st place, gold medalist(s)
Jayson Rampersad	Pommel horse	—N/a	14.333	—N/a				14.333	2nd place, silver medalist(s)
René Cournoyer	Rings	—N/a		13.633	—N/a			13.633	6
Félix Dolci	Rings	—N/a		13.800	—N/a			13.800	3rd place, bronze medalist(s)
Félix Dolci	Vault	—N/a			14.383	—N/a		14.383	3rd place, bronze medalist(s)
Zachary Clay	Parallel bars	—N/a				13.566	—N/a	13.566	5
William Émard	Parallel bars	—N/a				13.266	—N/a	13.266	6
René Cournoyer	Horizontal bar	—N/a					14.066	14.066	3rd place, bronze medalist(s)
William Émard	Horizontal bar	—N/a					11.800	11.800	8

Women

Team & Individual Qualification

Athlete	Event	Apparatus				Total	
Athlete	Event	V	UB	BB	F	Score	Rank
Cassie Lee	Team	—N/a		12.033	12.333	—N/a	
Frédérique Sgarbossa	Team	13.033	12.100	—N/a			
Ava Stewart	Team	13.300	12.400 Q	13.666 Q	12.466	51.832	6 Q
Aurélie Tran	Team	13.200	13.400 Q	12.866 Q	12.666 Q	52.132	5 Q
Sydney Turner	Team	12.966	11.000	12.633	12.500 Q	49.099	11
Total	Team	39.533	37.900	39.165	37.632	154.230	3rd place, bronze medalist(s)

Qualification Legend: Q = Qualified to apparatus final

Individual Finals

Athlete	Event	Apparatus				Total	
Athlete	Event	F	BB	V	UB	Score	Rank
Ava Stewart	All-around	12.466	13.666	13.300	12.400	51.832	6
Aurélie Tran	All-around	12.666	12.866	13.200	13.400	52.132	5
Aurélie Tran	Floor	13.166	—N/a			13.166	5
Sydney Turner	Floor	12.500	—N/a			12.500	7
Ava Stewart	Balance beam	—N/a	13.900	—N/a		13.900	3rd place, bronze medalist(s)
Aurélie Tran	Balance beam	—N/a	12.133	—N/a		12.133	8
Ava Stewart	Uneven bars	—N/a			13.100	13.100	6
Aurélie Tran	Uneven bars	—N/a			13.100	13.100	5

=== Rhythmic ===
Canada qualified two individual gymnasts and five gymnasts for the group event in rhythmic.

Individual

Athlete	Event	Apparatus				Total	
Athlete	Event	Ball	Clubs	Hoop	Ribbon	Score	Rank
Tatiana Cocsanova	All-around	28.850 Q	27.000	26.650	24.250	106.750	9
Carmel Kallemaa	All-around	27.950	27.700 Q	27.700 Q	25.400 Q	108.750	8
Tatiana Cocsanova	Ball	28.100	—N/a			28.100	7
Carmel Kallemaa	Clubs	—N/a	28.700	—N/a		28.700	6
Carmel Kallemaa	Hoop	—N/a		26.700	—N/a	26.700	8
Carmel Kallemaa	Ribbon	—N/a			26.300	26.300	7

Group

Athlete	Event	Apparatus		Total	
Athlete	Event	5 hoops	3 ribbons + 2 balls	Score	Rank
Katherina Bakhmutova; Emily Huseynov; Karina Kamenetsky; Christina Savchenko; Victoria Smolianova	All-around	28.650 Q	17.800 Q	46.450	6
Katherina Bakhmutova; Emily Huseynov; Karina Kamenetsky; Christina Savchenko; Victoria Smolianova	5 hoops	25.350	—N/a	25.350	4
Katherina Bakhmutova; Emily Huseynov; Karina Kamenetsky; Christina Savchenko; Victoria Smolianova	3 ribbons + 2 balls	—N/a	21.150	21.150	7

=== Trampoline ===
Canada qualified four gymnasts in trampoline (two men and two women) at the 2023 Pan American Championships.

Men

Athlete	Event	Qualification		Final	
Athlete	Event	Score	Rank	Score	Rank
Rémi Aubin	Individual	28.040	13	Did not advance	
Keegan Soehn	Individual	57.380	5 Q	12.120	8
Rémi Aubin; Keegan Soehn	Synchronized	49.240	2 Q	48.480	2nd place, silver medalist(s)

Women

Athlete	Event	Qualification		Final	
Athlete	Event	Score	Rank	Score	Rank
Rachel Tam	Individual	52.500	7 Q	49.330	7
Gabriella Flynn; Rachel Tam	Synchronized	44.930	3 Q	Did not start	

== Handball ==
Summary

Team	Event	Group stage				5th to 8th semifinals	Final / Pl.	
Team	Event	Opposition Result	Opposition Result	Opposition Result	Rank	Opposition Result	Opposition Result	Rank
Canada women	Women's tournament	Chile; L 14–23	Puerto Rico; L 20–25	Argentina; L 10–31	4	5th–8th place classification Cuba; L 20–26	Seventh place match Uruguay; L 19–22	8

=== Women's tournament ===
Canada qualified a women's team (of 14 athletes) by winning the USA-CAN Qualifying Round. The final roster was named on August 31, 2023.

Roster

Canada's roster of 14 athletes was officially named on August 31, 2023. On October 12, 2023, it was announced Maksi Pallas was replaced by Katya Chan.

- Nassima Benhacine
- Teodora Bosonea
- Katya Chan
- Vassilia Gagnon
- Samantha Koosau
- Laurie Lacasse
- Rosali Langlois
- Myriam Laplante
- Catherine Léger
- Audrey Marcoux
- Alexandra Pivin
- Émily Routhier
- Haven Wong
- Myriam Zimmer

Preliminary round

Pos	Team	Pld	W	D	L	GF	GA	GD	Pts	Qualification
1	Argentina	3	3	0	0	105	42	+63	6	Semifinals
2	Chile (H)	3	2	0	1	61	57	+4	4	Semifinals
3	Puerto Rico	3	1	0	2	57	89	−32	2	5–8th place semifinals
4	Canada	3	0	0	3	44	79	−35	0	5–8th place semifinals

Source: Santiago 2023
Rules for classification: 1) points; 2) head-to-head points; 3) head-to-head goal difference; 4) head-to-head goals scored; 5) goal difference; 6) goals scored; 7) draw.
(H) Hosts

24 October 2023; 20:00	Canada	14–23	Chile	Gimnasio Polideportivo de Viña del Mar; Referees: Correa, Converse (ARG)
24 October 2023; 20:00	Lacasse, Laplante 3	(11–11)	Lovera 7	Gimnasio Polideportivo de Viña del Mar; Referees: Correa, Converse (ARG)
24 October 2023; 20:00	6× (suspension) 1× (red card)	Report	1× (yellow card) 3× (suspension)	Gimnasio Polideportivo de Viña del Mar; Referees: Correa, Converse (ARG)

25 October 2023; 20:00	Puerto Rico	25–20	Canada	Gimnasio Polideportivo de Viña del Mar; Referees: Corrêa, Corrêa (BRA)
25 October 2023; 20:00	Cabrera, Hiraldo 6	(15–7)	Zimmer 6	Gimnasio Polideportivo de Viña del Mar; Referees: Corrêa, Corrêa (BRA)
25 October 2023; 20:00	1× (suspension)	Report	2× (suspension)	Gimnasio Polideportivo de Viña del Mar; Referees: Corrêa, Corrêa (BRA)

26 October 2023; 17:30	Argentina	31–10	Canada	Gimnasio Polideportivo de Viña del Mar; Referees: Aguilera, Gutiérrez (CHI)
26 October 2023; 17:30	Karsten 10	(15–4)	Laplante 3	Gimnasio Polideportivo de Viña del Mar; Referees: Aguilera, Gutiérrez (CHI)
26 October 2023; 17:30	1× (suspension)	Report	6× (suspension)	Gimnasio Polideportivo de Viña del Mar; Referees: Aguilera, Gutiérrez (CHI)

Fifth to eighth place semifinals

28 October 2023; 10:00	Cuba	26–20	Canada	Gimnasio Polideportivo de Viña del Mar; Referees: García, Paolantoni (ARG)
28 October 2023; 10:00	Téllez 7	(13–6)	three players 4	Gimnasio Polideportivo de Viña del Mar; Referees: García, Paolantoni (ARG)
28 October 2023; 10:00	3× (suspension)	Report	1× (yellow card) 5× (suspension)	Gimnasio Polideportivo de Viña del Mar; Referees: García, Paolantoni (ARG)

Seventh place match

29 October 2023; 12:00	Canada	19–22	Uruguay	Gimnasio Polideportivo de Viña del Mar; Referees: Aguilera, Gutiérrez (CHI)
29 October 2023; 12:00	Routhier 6	(11–10)	Bianco 6	Gimnasio Polideportivo de Viña del Mar; Referees: Aguilera, Gutiérrez (CHI)
29 October 2023; 12:00	1× (yellow card) 8× (suspension) 1× (red card)	Report	2× (suspension)	Gimnasio Polideportivo de Viña del Mar; Referees: Aguilera, Gutiérrez (CHI)

== Judo ==
Canada has qualified 8 judokas (six men and two women). The official team of eight athletes was named on October 2, 2023. Alexandre Arencibia later withdrew from the team and was not replaced. This meant the team dropped to seven judoka (five men and two women).

Men

Athlete	Event	Round of 16	Quarterfinals	Semifinals	Repechage	Final / BM	
Athlete	Event	Opposition Result	Opposition Result	Opposition Result	Opposition Result	Opposition Result	Rank
Julien Frascadore	−66 kg	Jara (MEX); W 100–003	Preciado (ECU); W 100–003	Postigos (PER); W 100–003	Bye	Garcia (VEN); L 00–10	2nd place, silver medalist(s)
Antoine Bouchard	−73 kg	Bye	Cargnin (BRA); L 002–011	Did not advance	Vega (CHI); W 10–00	Bronze medal final Tornal (DOM); W 101–002	3rd place, bronze medalist(s)
David Popovici	−81 kg	Berliner (USA); W 10–00	Schimidt (BRA); W 002–120	Did not advance	Morales (ARG); W 011–001	Bronze medal final Mc Kenzie (CUB); W 111–013	3rd place, bronze medalist(s)
Shady El Nahas	−100 kg	Bye	Keeve (USA); W 101–002	Goncalves (BRA); W 101–001	Bye	Briceño (CHI); W 101–002	1st place, gold medalist(s)
Marc Deschenes	+100 kg	Bye	Figueroa (ECU); W 100–001	Solis (CHI); L 000–100	Bye	Bronze medal final Silva (BRA); L 001–101	=5

Women

Athlete	Event	Round of 16	Quarterfinals	Semifinals	Repechage	Final / BM	
Athlete	Event	Opposition Result	Opposition Result	Opposition Result	Opposition Result	Opposition Result	Rank
Isabelle Harris	−63 kg	Bye	Awiti (MEX); W 110–001	Quadros (BRA); W 101–001	Bye	Carvajal (CUB); L 00–10	2nd place, silver medalist(s)
Coralie Godbout	−78 kg	Bye	Silvestre (DOM); L 010–00	Did not advance	Figueroa (PER); L 00–10	Did not advance	7

== Karate ==
Canada qualified a total of six karatekas (one man and five women). Yamina Lahyanssa qualified through the 2021 Junior Pan American Games in Cali, Colombia, two athletes through the 2023 North American Cup and the remaining three through the 2023 Pan American Championships qualifying event. The team was officially named on July 14, 2023. The six qualified athletes marked the most karatekas Canada has sent to an edition of the Pan American Games. Hana Furumoto did not compete as her arm injury did not recover in time for the games. All her matches were forfeited.

Kumite

Athlete	Event	Round robin					Semifinal	Final	
Athlete	Event	Opposition Result	Opposition Result	Opposition Result	Opposition Result	Rank	Opposition Result	Opposition Result	Rank
Ryan O'Neil	Men's −75 kg	Scott (USA); L 2–3	Villarreal (MEX); L 4–5	Barrios (URU); L 4–5	—N/a	4	Did not advance		
Yamina Lahyanssa	Women's −50 kg	Vega Rojas (CHI); W 2–1	Polanco (DOM); W 2–0	Salazar (VEN); L 3–10	—N/a	2 Q	Benitez (ARG); W 0–0	Salazar (VEN); L 2–5	2nd place, silver medalist(s)
Hana Furumoto	Women's −55 kg	Toro (CHI); L 0–0	Peña (COL); L 0–0	Novak (ARG); L 0–0	Servin (PAR); L 0–0	5	Did not advance		
Melissa Bratic	Women's −68 kg	Cuervo (VEN); W 3–0	Aponte (BOL); W 0–0	Rodrigues (BRA); L 1–3	Campos (MEX); W 9–1	2 Q	Mosquera (COL); L 0–4	Did not advance	3rd place, bronze medalist(s)
Lily-Rose Nolet	Women's +68 kg	Madani (USA); L 0–2	Echever (ECU); W 8–3	Quintal (MEX); L 0–5	—N/a	4	Did not advance		

Kata

Athlete	Event	Round robin				Final / BM	
Athlete	Event	Opposition Result	Opposition Result	Opposition Result	Rank	Opposition Result	Rank
Claudia Laos-Loo	Women's individual	Orbe (ECU); W 39.60–38.30	Zapata (COL); L 38.20–39.60	Armada (VEN); L 38.10–39.20	3 FB	Bronze medal final Gallo (CHI); W 40.10–39.10	3rd place, bronze medalist(s)

== Modern pentathlon ==
Canada qualified four modern pentathletes (two men and two women). Canada was later reallocated a women's quota spot. The final team of five athletes (two men and three women) was officially named on September 27, 2023.

Men

Athlete	Event	Fencing ranking round (Épée one touch)			Semifinal									Final												
Athlete	Event	Fencing ranking round (Épée one touch)			Fencing	Swimming (200 m freestyle)			Shooting / Running (10 m laser pistol / 3000 m cross-country)			Total		Fencing	Swimming			Riding (Show jumping)				Shooting / Running			Total	
Athlete	Event	V – D	Rank	MP points	BP	Time	Rank	MP points	Time	Rank	MP points	MP points	Rank	BP	Time	Rank	MP points	Time	Faults	Rank	MP points	Time	Rank	MP points	MP points	Rank
Robert Bonomo	Individual	8–22	28	172	2	2:07.45	2	296	11:14.20	12	626	1096	11	Did not advance												
Quinn Schulz	Individual	17–13	11	226	0	2:08.38	1	294	11:31.90	8	609	1129	8 Q	2	2:08.74	5	293	1:18.00	45	13	255	11:28.60	18	612	1388	14
Robert Bonomo; Quinn Schulz	Relay	19–21	8	214	—N/a									0	1:52.85	1	325	2:24.00	82	8	218	13:24.60	11	496	1263	8

Women

Athlete	Event	Fencing ranking round (Épée one touch)			Semifinal									Final												
Athlete	Event	Fencing ranking round (Épée one touch)			Fencing	Swimming (200 m freestyle)			Shooting / Running (10 m laser pistol / 3000 m cross-country)			Total		Fencing	Swimming			Riding (Show jumping)				Shooting / Running			Total	
Athlete	Event	V – D	Rank	MP points	BP	Time	Rank	MP points	Time	Rank	MP points	MP points	Rank	BP	Time	Rank	MP points	Time	Faults	Rank	MP points	Time	Rank	MP points	MP points	Rank
Kelly Fitzsimmons	Individual	19–13	10	232	0	2:24.38	3	262	13:01.60	6	519	1013	6 Q	2	2:25.52	3	259	54.01	0	2	300	13:26.70	17	494	1287	11
Olivia Li	Individual	15–17	22	208	0	3:02.55	16	185	11:50.50	12	557	950	13	Did not advance												
Devan Wiebe	Individual	12–20	27	190	0	2:55.46	15	200	12:10.80	12	556	946	12	Did not advance												
Kelly Fitzsimmons; Devan Wiebe	Relay	16–20	6	205	—N/a									0	2:23.59	7	263	2:20.00	58	2	242	14:15.30	4	445	1155	3rd place, bronze medalist(s)

Mixed

Athlete	Event	Fencing (Épée one touch)				Swimming (200 m freestyle)			Riding (Show jumping)				Shooting / Running (10 m laser pistol / 3000 m cross-country)			Total	
Athlete	Event	V – D	Rank	MP points	BP	Time	Rank	MP points	Time	Faults	Rank	MP points	Time	Rank	MP points	MP points	Rank
Quinn Schulz; Kelly Fitzsimmons	Relay	27–17	1	234	4	2:02.51	1	305	2:12.02	26	3	274	14:49.10	11	411	1228	5

== Racquetball ==
Canada qualified four racquetball athletes (two men and two women). Canada's team of four athletes was officially named on August 1, 2023.

Men

Athlete	Event	Round of 32	Round of 16	Quarterfinal	Semifinal	Final	
Athlete	Event	Opposition Result	Opposition Result	Opposition Result	Opposition Result	Opposition Result	Rank
Coby Iwaasa	Singles	Bye	Acuña (CRC); L 0–3 (9–11, 7–11, 6–11)	Did not advance			
Samuel Murray	Singles	Bye	Garcia (CRC); W 3–0 (11–8, 11–6, 12–10)	Keller (BOL); L 1–3 (9–11, 13–11, 12–14, 6–11)	Did not advance		
Coby Iwaasa; Samuel Murray	Doubles	—N/a	Bye	De La Rosa / Landa (USA); W 3–2 (4–11, 8–11, 11–8, 11–8, 11–4)	Galicia / Salvatierra (EAI); W 3–2 (11–9, 8–11, 11–7, 8–11, 11–7)	Mar / Montoya (MEX); L 1–3 (11–6, 7–11, 10–12, 10–12)	2nd place, silver medalist(s)
Coby Iwaasa; Samuel Murray	Team	—N/a	Bye	Costa Rica; W 2–0 (3–2, 3–1)	Mexico; W 2–1 (0–3, 3–0, 3–1)	Bolivia; L 0–2 (2–3, 0–3)	2nd place, silver medalist(s)

Women

Athlete	Event	Round of 32	Round of 16	Quarterfinal	Semifinal	Final	
Athlete	Event	Opposition Result	Opposition Result	Opposition Result	Opposition Result	Opposition Result	Rank
Frédérique Lambert	Singles	Mansilla (CHI); W 3–0 (11–3, 11–2, 11–6)	Mendez (ARG); L 1–3 (9–11, 7–11, 11–7, 8–11)	Did not advance			
Michèle Morissette	Singles	Muñoz (CHI); L 0–3 (4–11, 10–12, 7–11)	Did not advance				
Frédérique Lambert; Michèle Morissette	Doubles	—N/a	Gomez / Ortiz (CRC); W 3–1 (11–8, 11–7, 7–11, 11–5)	Herrera / Mejia (MEX); L 1–3 (3–11, 7–11, 7–11)	Did not advance		
Frédérique Lambert; Michèle Morissette	Team	—N/a	Chile; W 2–1 (3–0, 0–3, 3–0)	Mexico; L 0–2 (0–3, 2–3)	Did not advance		

Mixed

Athlete	Event	Round of 16	Quarterfinal	Semifinal	Final	
Athlete	Event	Opposition Result	Opposition Result	Opposition Result	Opposition Result	Rank
Samuel Murray; Frédérique Lambert	Doubles	Acuña / Ortiz (CRC); W 3–1 (11–7, 11–2, 10–12, 11–5)	Barrios / Moscoso (BOL); L 1–3 (5–11, 9–11, 11–8, 4–11)	Did not advance		

== Roller sports ==
=== Skateboarding ===
Canada qualified a team of four athletes (two men and two women) in skateboarding. The team was officially named on August 30, 2023.

Athlete	Event	Final	
Athlete	Event	Score	Rank
Adam Hopkins	Men's park	31.70	8
Ryan Decenzo	Men's street	236.29	4
Fay De Fazio Ebert	Women's park	84.66	1st place, gold medalist(s)
Samantha Secours	Women's street	63.26	9

== Rowing ==
Canada qualified a team of 15 athletes (seven men and eight women) along with a coxswain. The final team of 16 athletes (seven men and nine women) was named on September 27, 2023.

Men

Athlete	Event	Heat		Repechage		Semifinal		Final A/B	
Athlete	Event	Time	Rank	Time	Rank	Time	Rank	Time	Rank
Shane Willis	Single sculls	7:28.37	2 SA/B	Bye		7:19.98	3 FA	7:12.81	5
Michael Ciepiela; Rui Xu	Double sculls	6:58.77	5 R	6:43.14	1 SA/B	6:38.13	4 FB	6:40.66	7
Connor Attridge; Quinn Storey	Pair	7:19.14	5 R	6:55.44	3 FB	—N/a		6:59.13	7
Emerson Crick; Stephen Harris	Lightweight double sculls	6:34.34	1 FA	Bye		—N/a		6:33.94	5

Women

Athlete	Event	Heat		Repechage		Semifinal		Final A/B	
Athlete	Event	Time	Rank	Time	Rank	Time	Rank	Time	Rank
Alizée Brien; Shaye de Paiva	Double sculls	7:32.91	1 FA	Bye		—N/a		7:13.14	3rd place, bronze medalist(s)
Alizée Brien; Shaye de Paiva; Kendra Hartley; Parker Illingworth	Quadruple sculls	—N/a						6:35.62	3rd place, bronze medalist(s)
Abigail Dent; Olivia McMurray	Pair	7:37.96	1 FA	Bye		—N/a		7:20.64	2nd place, silver medalist(s)
Kendra Hartley; Parker Illingworth; Abby Speirs; Leia Till	Four	—N/a						6:44.82	4
Alizée Brien; Abigail Dent; Shaye de Paiva; Kendra Hartley; Parker Illingworth; Olivia McMurray; Abby Speirs; Leia Till; Kristen Kit c	Eight	—N/a						6:10.70	1st place, gold medalist(s)

Mixed

Athlete	Event	Heat		Repechage		Final A/B	
Athlete	Event	Time	Rank	Time	Rank	Time	Rank
Connor Attridge; Emerson Crick; Stephen Harris; Quinn Storey; Abigail Dent; Olivia McMurray; Abby Speirs; Leia Till; Kristen Kit c	Eight	6:08.60	3 R	6:00.72	2 FA	5:58.70	4

== Rugby sevens ==
Summary

Team	Event	Group stage				Semifinal	Final / BM / Pl.	
Team	Event	Opposition Result	Opposition Result	Opposition Result	Rank	Opposition Result	Opposition Result	Rank
Canada men	Men's tournament	Brazil; W 22–12	Mexico; W 42–5	United States; L 5–19	2 Q	Argentina; L 7–21	Bronze medal match United States; W 19–17	3rd place, bronze medalist(s)
Canada women	Women's tournament	Chile; W 36–0	Mexico; W 69–0	Brazil; W 29–21	1 Q	Colombia; W 45–14	United States; L 12–19	2nd place, silver medalist(s)

=== Men's tournament ===
Canada men's team is automatically qualified to the Pan American Games.

Roster

The team roster of 12 athletes was named on October 3, 2023.

- Phil Berna
- Jack Carson
- Elias Ergas
- Ethan Hager
- Elias Hancock
- Thomas Isherwood
- Lockie Kratz
- Matt Percillier
- David Richard
- Alex Russell
- Kal Sager
- Jake Thiel

Pool stage

Pos	Team	Pld	W	D	L	PF	PA	PD	Pts	Qualification
1	United States	3	3	0	0	84	17	+67	9	Semifinals
2	Canada	3	2	0	1	69	36	+33	7	Semifinals
3	Brazil	3	1	0	2	46	39	+7	5	5–8th place semifinals
4	Mexico	3	0	0	3	12	119	−107	3	5–8th place semifinals

Source: Santiago 2023
Rules for classification: 1) Points; 2) Head-to-head result; 3) Point difference; 4) Points scored; 5) draw.

3 November 2023
12:05

Canada	22–12	Brazil
Try: Richard (3) 0', 2', 6'; Hager 3'; Con: Kratz (1/2) 1'	Report	Try: Alves de Morais 5'; Duque 1'; Con: Da Silva (1/1) 1'

Estadio Municipal de La Pintana
Referee: Francisco González (Uruguay)

3 November 2023
17:05

Canada	42–5	Mexico
Try: McDougall 3'; Kratz (2) 8', 3'; Richard (2) 2', 8'; Thiel 4'; Con: Kratz (6/6) 6', 9', 2', 3', 4', 8'	Report	Try: Martín 6'

Estadio Municipal de La Pintana
Referee: Cauã Santos (Brazil)

3 November 2023
20:00

United States	19–5	Canada
Try: Vi (2) 1', 3'; Wendling 6'; Con: Lacamp (1/2) 1'; Walsh (1/1) 3'	Report	Try: McDougall 1'

Estadio Municipal de La Pintana
Referee: Gonzalo de Achaval (Argentina)

Semifinal

4 November 2023
12:55

Argentina	21–7	Canada
Try: Lavayen 2'; Fraga 2'; Moneta 6'; Con: Mare (3/3) 2', 2', 6'	Report	Try: Russell 4'; Con: Kratz (1/1) 4'

Estadio Municipal de La Pintana
Referee: Francisco López (United States)

Bronze medal match

4 November 2023
17:10

Canada	19–17	United States
Try: Richard 3'; Thier 1'; Russell 3'; Con: Kratz (2/3) 3', 3'	Report	Try: Thomas 5'; Williams 2'; Vi 6'; Con: Lacamp (1/3) 3'

Estadio Municipal de La Pintana
Referee: Cauã Santos (Brazil)

=== Women's tournament ===
Canada women's team is automatically qualified to the Pan American Games.

Roster

The team roster of 12 athletes was named on October 3, 2023.

- Alysha Corrigan
- Caroline Crossley
- Chloe Daniels
- Olivia De Couvreur
- Asia Hogan-Rochester
- Eden Kilgour
- Piper Logan
- Breanne Nicholas
- Carissa Norsten
- Lucie Romeo
- Shalaya Valenzuela
- Charity Williams

Pool stage

Pos	Team	Pld	W	D	L	PF	PA	PD	Pts	Qualification
1	Canada	3	3	0	0	134	21	+113	9	Semifinals
2	Brazil	3	2	0	1	109	29	+80	7	Semifinals
3	Chile	3	1	0	2	27	82	−55	5	5–8th place semifinals
4	Mexico	3	0	0	3	5	143	−138	3	5–8th place semifinals

Source: Santiago 2023
Rules for classification: 1) Points; 2) Head-to-head result; 3) Point difference; 4) Points scored; 5) draw.

3 November 2023
11:15

Canada	36–0	Chile
Try: Logan (2) 2', 0'; De Couvreur 7'; Williams 2'; Daniels 4'; Valenzuela 5'; Con: Hogan-Rochester (3/3) 3', 7', 0'	Report

Estadio Municipal de La Pintana
Referee: Francisco Lopez (United States)

3 November 2023
15:50

Canada	69–0	Mexico
Try: Carissa Norsten 0'; Hogan-Rochester (2) 2', 1'; Logan 5'; Williams (2) 6', 8'; Romeo (2) 0', 3'; Nicholas 4'; Valenzuela 6'; Con: Hogan-Rochester (6/8) 0', 2', 5', 6', 1', 3'; Nicholas (1/1) 6'	Report

Estadio Municipal de La Pintana
Referee: Nerea Livoni (Argentina)

3 November 2023
19:10

Canada	29–21	Brazil
Try: Norsten 0'; Logan 5'; Williams (2) 2', 4'; Romeo 6'; Con: Hogan-Rochester (2/3) 5', 3'	Report	Try: Nicolau 3'; Campos 6'; Silva 1'; Con: Nicolau (3/3) 4', 7', 1'

Estadio Municipal de La Pintana
Referee: Frank Méndez (Chile)

Semifinal

4 November 2023
11:40

Colombia	14–45	Canada
Try: Durango 5'; Cordoba 5'; Con: Lopera (1/1) 5'; Pacheco (1/1) 5'	Report	Try: Norsten 1'; Corrigan (2) 3'; Logan (2) 6', 1'; Hogan-Rochester 7'; Nicholas 3'; Corrigan 6'; Con: Hogan-Rochester (3/4) 1', 3', 7'; Williams (1/1) 2'; Nicholas (1/2) 4'

Estadio Municipal de La Pintana
Referee: Frank Méndez (Chile)

Gold medal match

4 November 2023
17:40

United States	19–12	Canada
Try: Kirshe 9'; Sedrick 4'; Tapper 6'; Con: Olsen (2/3) 10', 5'	Report	Try: Logan (2) 3', 0'; Con: Williams (1/1) 1'

Estadio Municipal de La Pintana
Referee: Nerea Livoni (Argentina)

== Sailing ==
Canada qualified 10 boats for a total of 15 sailors. Sailors were qualified to be nominated to the team in February, March and April 2023. The full team of 15 sailors (seven men and eight women) was officially named on September 20, 2023.

Men

Athlete	Event	Opening series																		Finals		
Athlete	Event	1	2	3	4	5	6	7	8	9	10	11	12	13	14	15	16	Points	Rank	M	Points	Rank
Fillah Karim	Laser	3	10	13	9	5	9	~~15~~	8	7	8	—N/a						72	8	Did not advance		
Lee Parkhill	Sunfish	1	4	1	4	4	1	1	4	1	~~5~~	—N/a						21	1 Q	4	25	1st place, gold medalist(s)
Justin Barnes; Will Jones	49er	6	2	2	4	3	2	6	~~7~~	2	4	2	5	6	—N/a			38	3 Q	6	44	3rd place, bronze medalist(s)
Mac Morrin	Kites	6	~~7~~	7	5	7	5	5	6	6	7	6	5	7	5	~~10~~; ~~UFD~~	~~8~~	77	7 Q	—N/a	7	7

Women

Athlete	Event	Opening series																		Finals				
Athlete	Event	1	2	3	4	5	6	7	8	9	10	11	12	13	14	15	16	Points	Rank	QF	SF	M / F	Points	Rank
Rebecca Heller	IQFoil	~~11~~; ~~DNF~~	~~11~~; ~~DNF~~	~~11~~; ~~DNF~~	11; DNF	11; DNF	11; DNF	11; DNF	11; DNF	11; DNF	9 STP	8	11; DNF	9 STP	11; DNF	8	7	129	8 q	6	Did not advance			9
Sarah Douglas	Laser radial	1	2	~~4~~	2	2	1	4	4	2	3	—N/a						21	2 Q	—N/a		4	25	2nd place, silver medalist(s)
Mariah Millen; Alexandra ten Hove	49erFX	1	3	3	~~4~~	3	2	3	1	2	1	2	1	—N/a				22	2 Q	—N/a		4	26	2nd place, silver medalist(s)
Emily Bugeja	Kites	5	5	5	~~8~~; ~~DNF~~	~~8~~; ~~DNF~~	5	~~8~~; ~~DNF~~	5	5	5	8 DNF	8 DNF	3	4	5	7	70	6	—N/a		Did not advance		

Mixed

Athlete	Event	Race													Total	
Athlete	Event	1	2	3	4	5	6	7	8	9	10	11	12	M	Points	Rank
Luke Ramsay; Rachel Green; Jessica Hirschbold	Lightning	6	2	3	2	2	5	~~9~~; ~~DSQ~~	1	4	6	—N/a		8	39	4
Galen Richardson; Madeline Gillis	Nacra 17	~~5~~	5	4	5	4	4	4	4	4	4	4	4	10	56	4

== Shooting ==
Canada qualified a total of 16 quota spots (shooters) at the 2022 Americas Shooting Championships. The final team was named on September 22, 2023 and consisted of 14 sport shooters (six men and eight women). Canada declined a spot in the men's trap event and Lindsay Boddez was scheduled to double up in the women's trap and skeet events.

Men

Athlete	Event	Qualification		Final	
Athlete	Event	Points	Rank	Points	Rank
Tugrul Ozer	10 m air pistol	574-9x	2	240.5 FPR	1st place, gold medalist(s)
Tye Ikeda	10 m air rifle	612.2	20	Did not advance	
Tye Ikeda	50 m rifle three positions	579-25x	5 Q	425.7	4
Grzegorz Sych	50 m rifle three positions	572-28x	13	Did not advance	
Colin Grover	Trap	102	24	Did not advance	
Trysten Curran-Routledge	Skeet	111	15	Did not advance	
Richard McBride	Skeet	110	20	Did not advance	

Women

Athlete	Event	Qualification		Final	
Athlete	Event	Points	Rank	Points	Rank
Audrey-Anne Le Sieur	10 m air pistol	538-9x	25	Did not advance	
Yanka Vasileva	10 m air pistol	556-9x	13	Did not advance	
Lynda Kiejko	25 m pistol	559	14	Did not advance	
Elizabeth Gustafson	25 m pistol	561	11	Did not advance	
Shannon Westlake	50 m rifle three positions	579-26x	7 Q	446.5	3rd place, bronze medalist(s)
Lindsay Boddez	Trap	85	15	Did not advance	
Madeline Scola	Trap	107	6	11	6
Madeleine Boyd	Skeet	108	9	Did not advance	

Mixed

Athlete	Event	Qualification		Final / BM	
Athlete	Event	Points	Rank	Opposition Result	Rank
Tugrul Ozer; Yanka Vasileva	10 m air pistol team	566	6	Did not advance	
Madeleine Boyd; Trysten Curran-Routledge	Skeet team	133	6	Did not advance	

== Softball ==
Canada qualified a team by virtue of its campaign at the 2022 Pan American Championships.

Summary

Team	Event	Preliminary round				Super round			Final / BM / Pl.	
Team	Event	Opposition Result	Opposition Result	Opposition Result	Rank	Opposition Result	Opposition Result	Rank	Opposition Result	Rank
Canada women	Women's tournament	Cuba; W 4–0	Peru; W 10–0	Puerto Rico; L 2–3	2 Q	Mexico; W 6–1	United States; L 3–8	3	Bronze medal match Mexico; W 7–0	3rd place, bronze medalist(s)

Roster

The team roster of 16 athletes was named on June 22, 2023.

- Dawn Bodrug
- Rylie Crane
- Emma Entzminger
- Larissa Franklin
- Sara Groenewegen
- Kelsey Harshman
- Zoe Hicks
- Kianna Jones
- Janet Leung
- Grace Messmer
- Callum Pilgrim
- Erika Polidori
- Morgan Rackel
- Morgan Reimer
- Nicole Rivait
- Natalie Wideman

Preliminary round

Pos	Team	Pld	W	L	RF	RA	PCT	GB	Qualification
1	Puerto Rico	3	3	0	8	3	1.000	—	Super Round
2	Canada	3	2	1	16	3	.667	1	Super Round
3	Cuba	3	1	2	5	6	.333	2	Fifth place game
4	Peru	3	0	3	0	17	.000	3	Seventh place game

Source: Santiago 2023 and WBSC Americas

October 29; 13:00	Cuba	0–4	Canada	Baseball and Softball Center, Santiago
October 29; 13:00		Boxscore		Baseball and Softball Center, Santiago

October 31; 10:00	Canada	10–0 (F/5)	Peru	Baseball and Softball Center, Santiago
October 31; 10:00		Boxscore		Baseball and Softball Center, Santiago

November 1; 16:00	Puerto Rico	3–2	Canada	Baseball and Softball Center, Santiago
November 1; 16:00		Boxscore		Baseball and Softball Center, Santiago

Super round

Pos	Team	Pld	W	L	RF	RA	PCT	GB	Qualification
1	United States	3	3	0	26	6	1.000	—	Gold medal game
2	Puerto Rico	3	2	1	7	13	.667	1	Gold medal game
3	Canada	3	1	2	11	12	.333	2	Bronze medal game
4	Mexico	3	0	3	1	14	.000	3	Bronze medal game

Source: Santiago 2023 and WBSC Americas

November 2; 16:00	Canada	6–1	Mexico	Baseball and Softball Center, Santiago
November 2; 16:00		Boxscore		Baseball and Softball Center, Santiago

November 3; 13:00	Canada	3–8	United States	Baseball and Softball Center, Santiago
November 3; 13:00		Boxscore		Baseball and Softball Center, Santiago

Bronze medal match

November 4; 10:00	Mexico	0–7 (F/5)	Canada (bronze)	Baseball and Softball Center, Santiago
November 4; 10:00		Boxscore		Baseball and Softball Center, Santiago

== Sport climbing ==
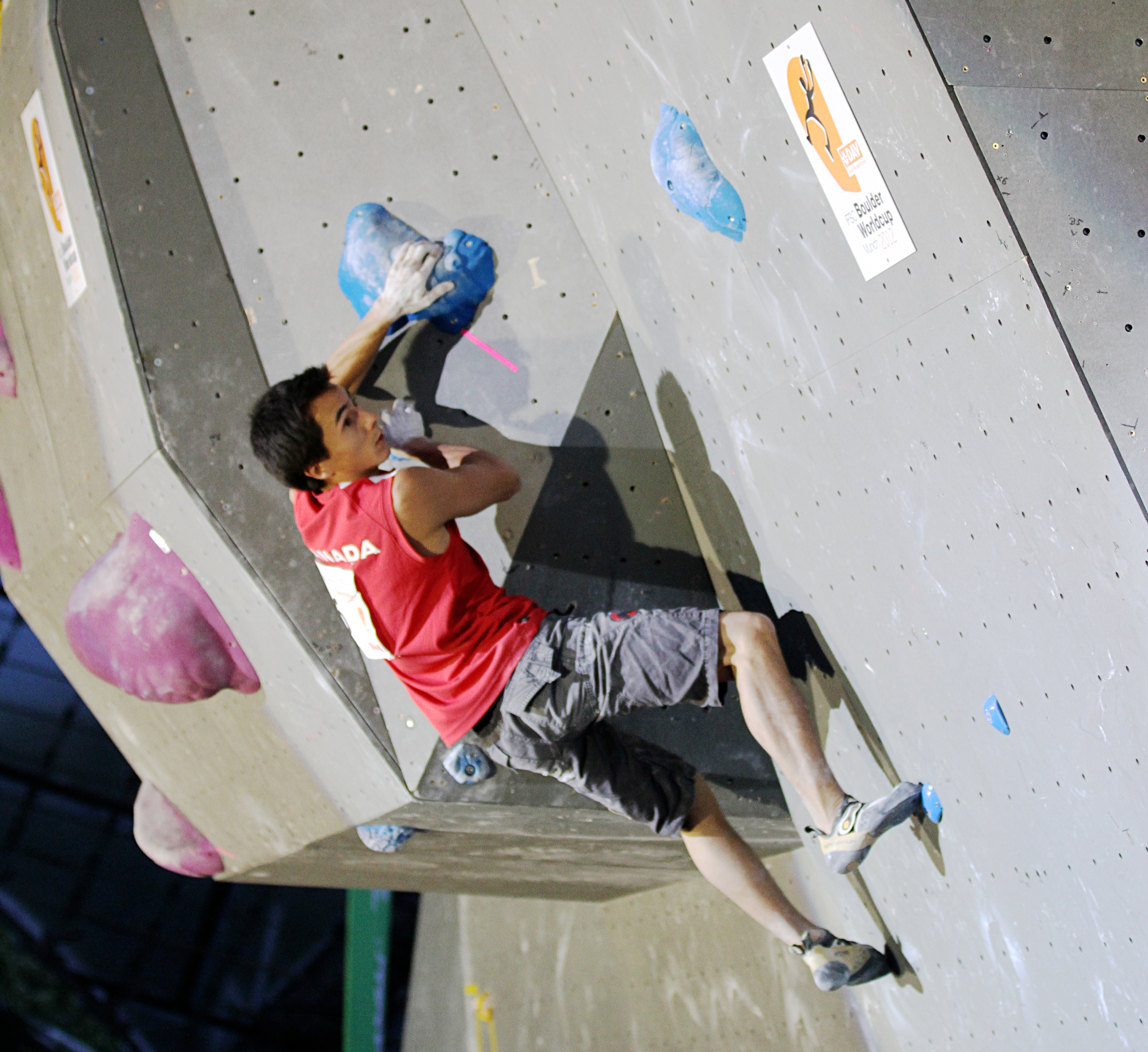
Sean McColl pictured here competing in 2012, finished fourth in the lead and boulder combined event.

Canada qualified ten sport climbers (six men and four women) in the inaugural appearance of the sport at the Pan American Games. The official team of ten athletes was named on August 29, 2023. Canada finished the games with one bronze medal by Alannah Yip in the women's boulder & lead event. This marked the country's first ever Pan American Games medal in the sport.

Boulder & lead

Athlete	Event	Qualification						Final					
Athlete	Event	Bouldering		Lead		Total		Bouldering		Lead		Total	
Athlete	Event	Points	Rank	Points	Rank	Points	Rank	Points	Rank	Points	Rank	Points	Rank
Oscar Baudrand	Men's	99.6	2	48.1	=6	147.7	4 Q	69.3	5	18.1	=6	87.4	5
Victor Baudrand	Men's	79.6	7	54.1	=4	133.7	6 Q	35.0	=7	48.1	=4	83.1	6
Sean McColl	Men's	84.7	3	68.1	3	152.8	3 Q	84.5	=1	48.1	=4	132.6	4
Indiana Chapman	Women's	64.3	10	30.1	=5	94.4	6 Q	34.7	6	51.1	8	85.8	8
Rebecca Frangos	Women's	64.6	=7	26.1	=8	90.7	=7 Q	29.3	8	57.1	5	86.4	7
Alannah Yip	Women's	84.5	3	48.1	3	147.8	3 Q	64.7	4	64	3	128.7	3rd place, bronze medalist(s)

Speed

Athlete	Event	Qualification			Round of 16	Quarterfinal	Semifinal	Final / BM	
Athlete	Event	Lane A	Lane B	Rank	Opposition Result	Opposition Result	Opposition Result	Opposition Result	Rank
Dylan Le	Men's	5.97	6.77	7 Q	Cancel (ECU); W 6.10–6.56	Granja (ECU); L 5.84–5.57	Did not advance		
Ethan Flynn-Pitcher	Men's	5.78	5.77	4 Q	Alencaster (MEX); W 5.71–7.35	Sternik (ARG); W 5.66–9.19	Watson (USA); L FALL–5.32	Bronze medal final Granja (ECU); L 5.59–5.52	4
Michael Finn-Henry	Men's	5.83	7.42	5 Q	Sternik (ARG); L 7.20–6.86	Did not advance			
Erica Velev	Women's	11.23	8.99	7 Q	—N/a	Curcio (USA); L 8.41–7.83	Did not advance		

== Squash ==
Canada qualified a full team of six athletes (three men and three women) through the 2023 Pan American Squash Championships. The team was officially named on August 30, 2023. On October 12, 2023, it was announced Danielle Letourneau was replaced by Nikki Todd.

Men

Athlete	Event	Round of 16	Quarterfinal	Semifinal	Final / BM	
Athlete	Event	Opposition Result	Opposition Result	Opposition Result	Opposition Result	Rank
David Baillargeon	Singles	Azaña (ARG); W 3–1 (7–11, 11–9, 11–9, 11–9)	Elías (PER); L 1–3 (11–6, 3–11, 4–11, 5–11)	Did not advance		
George Crowne	Singles	Brownell (USA); L 0–3 (8–11, 9–11, 9–11)	Did not advance			
David Baillargeon; Graeme Schnell	Doubles	—N/a	Enríquez / Enríquez (EAI); L 0–2 (10–11, 9–11)	Did not advance		
David Baillargeon; George Crowne; Graeme Schnell	Team	—N/a	United States; W 2–0	Colombia; L 0–2	Did not advance	3rd place, bronze medalist(s)

Women

Athlete	Event	Round of 32	Round of 16	Quarterfinal	Semifinal	Final / BM	
Athlete	Event	Opposition Result	Opposition Result	Opposition Result	Opposition Result	Opposition Result	Rank
Nicole Bunyan	Singles	Bye	Delgado (CHI); W 3–0 (11–6, 11–2, 13–11)	Stefanoni (USA); L 2–3 (11–8, 8–11, 11–5, 9–11, 8–11)	Did not advance		
Hollie Naughton	Singles	Bye	Gaitan (EAI); W 3–0 (11–3, 11–5, 11–5)	Best (BAR); W 3–2 (11–8, 11–8, 9–11, 7–11, 11–3)	Weaver (USA); L 1–3 (11–8, 5–11, 5–11, 9–11)	Did not advance	3rd place, bronze medalist(s)
Hollie Naughton; Nikki Todd	Doubles	—N/a		Bautista / Tovar (COL); L 1–2 (11–7, 4–11, 3–11)	Did not advance		
Hollie Naughton; Nicole Bunyan; Nikki Todd	Team	—N/a		Ecuador; W 3–0	Colombia; W 3–0	United States; L 0–2	2nd place, silver medalist(s)

Mixed

Athlete	Event	Quarterfinal	Semifinal	Final / BM	
Athlete	Event	Opposition Result	Opposition Result	Opposition Result	Rank
George Crowne; Nicole Bunyan	Doubles	Bye	Quisquinay / Gaitan (EAI); W 2–0 (11–8, 11–9)	Brownell / Clyne (USA); L 1–2 (6–11, 11–10, 6–11)	2nd place, silver medalist(s)

== Surfing ==
Canada qualified eight surfers (three men and five women). However, surfer Erin Brooks could not compete for Canada due to not receive Canadian citizenship in time. The official team of seven surfers (three men and four women) was named on October 4, 2023.

Artistic

Athlete	Event	Round 1	Round 2	Round 3	Round 4	Repechage 1	Repechage 2	Repechage 3	Repechage 4	Repechage 5	Repechage 6	Final / BM	
Athlete	Event	Opposition Result	Opposition Result	Opposition Result	Opposition Result	Opposition Result	Opposition Result	Opposition Result	Opposition Result	Opposition Result	Opposition Result	Opposition Result	Rank
Cody Young	Men's shortboard	Bellorín (VEN); L 9.50–12.93	Did not advance			Williams (MEX); W 12.33–10.14	Urbina (CRC); W 11.20–11.17	González (PAN); W 14.50–9.37	Cleland (MEX); W 11.00–6.87	Mesinas (PER); L 13.83–14.67	Did not advance		
Finn Spencer	Men's stand up paddleboard	Diniz (BRA); Salazar (CHI); L 10.93 Q	Schweitzer (USA); Rodríguez (MEX); L 8.60	Did not advance		—N/a	Bye	Faccin (ARG); W 12.64–7.30	Torres (PUR); W 11.33–11.27	Salazar (CHI); W 9.37–7.94	Diniz (BRA); L 9.66–15.17	Did not advance	3rd place, bronze medalist(s)
Sanoa Dempfle-Olin	Women's shortboard	Indurain (ARG); W 9.26–7.03	Weston-Webb (BRA); L 5.17–15.43	Did not advance		Bye	Indurain (ARG); W 15.96–9.00	Resano (NCA); W 14.90–11.94	Rosas (PER); W 11.84–8.44	López (CHI); W 11.33–4.23	McGonagle (CRC); W 10.00–4.20	Weston-Webb (BRA); L 10.13–12.33	2nd place, silver medalist(s)
Catherine Bruhwiler	Women's stand up paddleboard	Cosoleto (ARG); Lagos (CHI); L 4.84	Did not advance			—N/a	Finer (MEX); Alabi (ESA); L 6.17 Q	Lagos (CHI); W 9.00–7.44	Torres (PER); L 4.17–16.16	Did not advance			
Liv Stokes	Women's longboard	Beisso (URU); Bonilla (MEX); W 8.47 Q	Calmon (BRA); Pellizzari (ARG); L 5.10	Did not advance		—N/a	Bye	Wilson (CHI); W 8.00–7.03	Portillo (ESA); W 10.50–1.53	Reyes Días (CRC); L 4.94–9.33	Did not advance		

Race

Athlete	Event	Time	Rank
Michael Darbyshire	Men's stand up paddleboard	19:53.9	7
Lina Augaitis	Women's stand up paddleboard	20:09.0	9

== Swimming ==
On April 6, 2023 Swimming Canada announced the pool team of 36 athletes (18 per gender), representing the maximum team size. This was the first full team officially named to Canada's Pan American Games team. The team was named based on results at the 2023 Canadian Swimming Trials held in Toronto. The team has a mix of young and experienced swimmers, who are using the event as preparation for the 2024 Summer Olympics. A total of 11 former Olympians, including Olympic Gold medalist Maggie MacNeil were named to the team. On April 17, 2023, the open water swimming team was named to the games after the Canadian trials held on April 14, 2023 in the Cayman Islands. As part of the announcement it was announced pool swimmers Ben Miller and Rebecca Smith withdrew from the team and were replaced with Kevin Zhang and Julie Brousseau respectively. Benjamin Cote will compete in both disciplines, meaning the team size for swimming is 38 athletes (19 per gender). On October 12, 2023, it was announced Abby Dunford was replaced by Bailey O'Regan. Katrina Bellio, Ella Varga and Mabel Zavaros were on the preliminary team announcement, but were not named in the final team by the Canadian Olympic Committee. This mean the final team size was 35 athletes (19 men and 16 women).

Key

- Note – Ranks given are for the entire round
- NR – National record
- FA – Qualified for Final A
- FB – Qualified for Final B

Men

Athlete	Event	Heat		Final	
Athlete	Event	Time	Rank	Time	Rank
Stephen Calkins	50 m freestyle	22.85	14 FB	22.45	9
Edouard Fullum-Huot	50 m freestyle	22.78	12 FB	22.96	13
Javier Acevedo	100 m freestyle	49.26	8 FA	48.88	4
Edouard Fullum-Huot	100 m freestyle	49.76	12 FB	49.33	9
Javier Acevedo	200 m freestyle	1:50.28	9 FB	DNS	
Jeremy Bagshaw	200 m freestyle	1:49.74	8 FA	1:49.66	7
Jeremy Bagshaw	400 m freestyle	3:57.43	10 FB	DNS	
Yu Tong Wu	400 m freestyle	3:59.11	13 FB	3:57.85	9
Alex Axon	800 m freestyle	—N/a		8:09.35	6
Yu Tong Wu	800 m freestyle	—N/a		8:18.09	13
Alex Axon	1500 m freestyle	—N/a		15:35.05	7
Timothe Barbeau	1500 m freestyle	—N/a		15:35.59	8
Javier Acevedo	100 m backstroke	DNS		Did not advance	
Blake Tierney	100 m backstroke	54.68	1 FA	54.25	3rd place, bronze medalist(s)
Raben Dommann	200 m backstroke	2:00.97	4 FA	2:03.52	8
Hugh McNeill	200 m backstroke	2:01.76	5 FA	1:59.96	3rd place, bronze medalist(s)
James Dergousoff	100 m breaststroke	1:02.19	10 FB	1:01.97	10
Gabe Mastromatteo	100 m breaststroke	1:01.37	4 FA	1:01.39	6
James Dergousoff	200 m breaststroke	2:16.14	8 FA	2:15.67	7
Brayden Taivassalo	200 m breaststroke	2:13.40	2 FA	2:10.89	2nd place, silver medalist(s)
Finlay Knox	100 m butterfly	53.33	6 FA	52.89	4
Keir Ogilvie	100 m butterfly	54.22	10 FB	54.15	10
Kevin Zhang	200 m butterfly	2:00.22	5 FA	1:59.30	5
Collyn Gagne	200 m individual medley	2:02.18	1 FA	2:00.79	4
Finlay Knox	200 m individual medley	2:02.45	4 FA	1:58.74	1st place, gold medalist(s)
Benjamin Cote	400 m individual medley	4:23.68	6 FA	4:23.14	7
Collyn Gagne	400 m individual medley	4:22.14	2 FA	4:17.05	2nd place, silver medalist(s)
Benjamin Cote	10 km open water	—N/a		1:52:18.7	12
Eric Hedlin	10 km open water	—N/a		1:55:22.8	14
Javier Acevedo; Stephen Calkins; Edouard Fullum-Huot; Finlay Knox; Jeremy Bagshaw*; Blake Tierney*	4 × 100 m freestyle relay	3:20.33	3 FA	3:15.83	3rd place, bronze medalist(s)
Javier Acevedo; Alex Axon; Jeremy Bagshaw; Finlay Knox; Raben Dommann*; Blake Tierney*; Yu Tong Wu*	4 × 200 m freestyle relay	7:25.45	2 FA	7:14.76	3rd place, bronze medalist(s)
Javier Acevedo; Finlay Knox; Gabe Mastromatteo; Blake Tierney; Raben Dommann*; Edouard Fullum-Huot*; Keir Ogilvie*; Brayden Taivassalo*	4 × 100 m medley relay	3:39.27	3 FA	3:35.72	3rd place, bronze medalist(s)

* Swimmers who raced only in the heats, but received medals.

Women

Athlete	Event	Heat		Final	
Athlete	Event	Time	Rank	Time	Rank
Maggie Mac Neil	50 m freestyle	25.28	3 FA	24.84	= (gold)
Katerine Savard	50 m freestyle	DNS		Did not advance	
Mary-Sophie Harvey	100 m freestyle	55.77	7 FA	54.64	4
Maggie Mac Neil	100 m freestyle	55.76	6 FA	53.64 GR	1st place, gold medalist(s)
Emma O'Croinin	200 m freestyle	2:01.65	6 FA	2:00.79	6
Mary-Sophie Harvey	200 m freestyle	1:59.31	1 FA	1:58.08	1st place, gold medalist(s)
Julie Brousseau	400 m freestyle	4:15.56	6 FA	4:11.32	5
Emma O'Croinin	400 m freestyle	4:23.88	10 FB	DNS	
Laila Oravsky	800 m freestyle	—N/a		9:05.45	9
Laila Oravsky	1500 m freestyle	—N/a		17:18.64	8
Maddy Gatrall	100 m backstroke	1:01.79	3 FA	1:01.50	4
Danielle Hanus	100 m backstroke	1:02.14	6 FA	1:01.49	3rd place, bronze medalist(s)
Brooklyn Douthwright	200 m backstroke	2:18.88	12 FB	2:19.76	12
Maddy Gatrall	200 m backstroke	2:15.92	5 FA	2:14.44	5
Sophie Angus	100 m breaststroke	1:08.19	3 FA	1:07.55	2nd place, silver medalist(s)
Rachel Nicol	100 m breaststroke	1:08.10	1 FA	1:07.28	1st place, gold medalist(s)
Sydney Pickrem	200 m breaststroke	2:28.35	3 FA	2:23.39	1st place, gold medalist(s)
Kelsey Wog	200 m breaststroke	2:25.96	1 FA	2:23.49	2nd place, silver medalist(s)
Maggie Mac Neil	100 m butterfly	59.73	4 FA	56.94 GR	1st place, gold medalist(s)
Katerine Savard	100 m butterfly	59.87	6 FA	59.40	5
Katie Forrester	200 m butterfly	2:14.09	4 FA	2:12.90	4
Mary-Sophie Harvey	200 m individual medley	2:16.94	5 FA	2:11.92	2nd place, silver medalist(s)
Sydney Pickrem	200 m individual medley	2:14.41	1 FA	2:09.04 GR	1st place, gold medalist(s)
Julie Brousseau	400 m individual medley	4:49.78	2 FA	4:43.76	1st place, gold medalist(s)
Bailey O'Regan	10 km open water	—N/a		2:04:35.8	11
Emma Finlin	10 km open water	—N/a		1:59:56.7	6
Maggie Mac Neil; Brooklyn Douthwright; Katerine Savard; Mary-Sophie Harvey; Julie Brousseau*; Emma O'Croinin*	4 × 100 m freestyle relay	3:43.08	3 FA	3:37.75	1st place, gold medalist(s)
Julie Brousseau; Brooklyn Douthwright; Katerine Savard; Mary-Sophie Harvey; Emma O'Croinin*; Sydney Pickrem*	4 × 200 m freestyle relay	8:05.98	1 FA	7:56.98	3rd place, bronze medalist(s)
Danielle Hanus; Maggie Mac Neil; Rachel Nicol; Mary-Sophie Harvey; Sophie Angus*; Maddy Gatrall*; Brooklyn Douthwright*; Katerine Savard*	4 × 100 m medley relay	4:05.19	1 FA	3:58.76	1st place, gold medalist(s)

* Swimmers who raced only in the heats, but received medals.

Mixed

Athlete	Event	Heat		Final	
Athlete	Event	Time	Rank	Time	Rank
Javier Acevedo; Finlay Knox; Maggie Mac Neil; Mary-Sophie Harvey; Stephen Calkins*; Edouard Fullum-Huot*; Brooklyn Douthwright*; Katerine Savard*	4 × 100 m freestyle relay	3:30.05	2 FA	3:25.23	3rd place, bronze medalist(s)
Javier Acevedo; Gabe Mastromatteo; Maggie Mac Neil; Mary-Sophie Harvey; James Dergousoff*; Blake Tierney*; Brooklyn Douthwright*; Katerine Savard*	4 × 100 m medley relay	3:53.39	2 FA	3:46.20	2nd place, silver medalist(s)

* Swimmers who raced only in the heats, but received medals.

== Table tennis ==
Canada qualified a full team of six athletes (three men and three women) through the 2023 Pan American Games selection tournament held in Toronto, Ontario. The final team was named on July 19, 2023.

Men

Athlete	Event	Group stage			Round of 32	Round of 16	Quarterfinal	Semifinal	Final / BM	
Athlete	Event	Opposition Result	Opposition Result	Rank	Opposition Result	Opposition Result	Opposition Result	Opposition Result	Opposition Result	Rank
Edward Ly	Singles	—N/a			Moscoso (EAI); W 4–0 (11–4, 11–5, 12–10, 11–3)	Calderano (BRA); L 1–4 (6–11, 2–11, 12–10, 8–11, 8–11)	Did not advance			
Eugene Wang	Singles	—N/a			Ramos (COL); W 4–0 (11–9, 11–4, 11–7, 11–7)	Alto (ARG); W 4–1 (8–11, 12–10, 11–4, 11–7, 11–3)	Burgos (CHI); W 4–2 (7–11, 11–7, 9–11, 12–10, 11–6, 11–7)	Pereira (CUB); L 1–4 (8–11, 5–11, 9–11, 11–7, 10–12)	Did not advance	3rd place, bronze medalist(s)
Edward Ly; Siméon Martin	Doubles	—N/a				Aguirre / Toranzos (PAR); W 4–2 (9–11, 11–3, 8–11, 12–10, 11–9, 11–7)	Calderano / Ishiy (BRA); L 2–4 (6–11, 4–11, 11–4, 11–6, 4–11, 4–11)	Did not advance		
Edward Ly; Eugene Wang; Siméon Martin	Team	Puerto Rico; W 3–2 (0–3, 3–1, 0–3, 3–1, 3–0)	Independent Athletes Team; W 3–0 (3–0, 3–1, 3–0)	1 Q	—N/a		Ecuador; W 3–0 (3–0, 3–0, 3–0)	United States; W 3–2 (3–0, 3–1, 1–3, 1–3, 3–1)	Brazil; L 1–3 (0–3, 1–3, 3–0, 0–3)	2nd place, silver medalist(s)

Women

Athlete	Event	Group stage			Round of 32	Round of 16	Quarterfinal	Semifinal	Final / BM	
Athlete	Event	Opposition Result	Opposition Result	Rank	Opposition Result	Opposition Result	Opposition Result	Opposition Result	Opposition Result	Rank
Ivy Liao	Singles	—N/a			González (VEN); L 2–4 (6–11, 8–11, 11–7, 9–11, 11–3, 9–11)	Did not advance				
Zhang Mo	Singles	—N/a			Enríquez (EAI); W 4–1 (11–7, 9–11, 11–2, 11–8, 11–5)	Codina (ARG); W 4–1 (12–10, 4–11, 11–1, 11–4, 11–9)	Wang (USA); W 4–0 (11–7, 11–3, 11–7, 11–3)	Díaz (PUR); L 3–4 (13–11, 5–11, 7–11, 11–7, 9–11, 13–11, 6–11)	Did not advance	3rd place, bronze medalist(s)
Ivy Liao; Jessie Xu	Doubles	—N/a				Crespo / Fonseca (CUB); L 1–4 (10–12, 2–11, 11–7, 5–11, 3–11)	Did not advance			
Ivy Liao; Jessie Xu; Zhang Mo	Team	Venezuela; W 3–1 (3–0, 3–0, 2–3, 3–0)	Mexico; L 2–3 (0–3, 1–3, 3–2, 3–0, 1–3)	2 Q	—N/a		Brazil; L 1–3 (3–0, 1–3, 2–3, 2–3)	Did not advance		

Mixed

Athlete	Event	Round of 32	Round of 16	Quarterfinal	Semifinal	Final / BM	
Athlete	Event	Opposition Result	Opposition Result	Opposition Result	Opposition Result	Opposition Result	Rank
Eugene Wang; Zhang Mo	Doubles	Bye	Aguirre / Ovelar (PAR); W 4–0 (11–7, 11–7, 11–3, 11–4)	Madrid / Silva (MEX); W 4–3 (11–5, 8–11, 12–10, 7–11, 11–5, 9–11, 11–8)	Ishiy / Takahashi (BRA); L 2–4 (9–11, 5–11, 12–10, 4–11, 11–6, 8–11)	Did not advance	3rd place, bronze medalist(s)

== Taekwondo ==
Canada qualified 9 athletes (five men and four women) during the Pan American Games Qualification Tournament. The team of nine athletes was officially named on May 1, 2023.

Kyorugi

Men

Athlete	Event	Round of 16	Quarterfinals	Semifinals	Repechage	Final / BM	
Athlete	Event	Opposition Result	Opposition Result	Opposition Result	Opposition Result	Opposition Result	Rank
Braven Park	–58 kg	Bye	Granado (VEN); W 2–0	Plaza (MEX); L 1–2	Bye	Bronze medal final Garrido (COL); L 0–2	=5
Tae-Ku Park	–68 kg	Nieto (ECU); W 2–0	Morales (CHI); W 2–1	Pié (DOM); L 1–2	Bye	Bronze medal final Ferrnández (CUB); W 2–0	3rd place, bronze medalist(s)
Charlélie Mercier	–80 kg	Churchill (CHI); L 0–2	Did not advance				
Marc-André Bergeron	+80 kg	Bye	Álvarez (VEN); W 2–0	Sansores (MEX); L 1–2	Bye	Bronze medal final Soto (COL); W 2–1	3rd place, bronze medalist(s)
Braven Park; Tae-Ku Park; Marc-André Bergeron	Team	Venezuela; W 85–82	Mexico; L 49–61	Did not advance			

Women

Athlete	Event	Round of 16	Quarterfinals	Semifinals	Repechage	Final / BM	
Athlete	Event	Opposition Result	Opposition Result	Opposition Result	Opposition Result	Opposition Result	Rank
Angelique Orozco	–49 kg	Hurtado (BOL); L 0–2	Did not advance				
Skylar Park	–57 kg	Bye	Cox (USA); W 2–0	Carstens (PAN); W 2–1	Bye	Pacheco (BRA); W 2–1	1st place, gold medalist(s)
Ashley Kraayeveld	–67 kg	Ramírez (COL); W 2–1 DSQ	Velazquez (MEX); W 2–0	Soltero (MEX); L 1–2	Bye	Bronze medal final Gallardo (CHI); L 0–2	=5
Angelique Orozco; Skylar Park; Ashley Kraayeveld	Team	Peru; L WWD	Did not advance				

Poomsae

Athlete	Event	Round of 16	Quarterfinal	Semifinal	Final	
Athlete	Event	Opposition Result	Opposition Result	Opposition Result	Opposition Result	Rank
Jinsu Ha	Men's individual	Do (USA); L 7.300–7.430	Did not advance			
Valerie Ho	Women's individual	Darce (NCA); L WDR–1.0	Did not advance			
Jinsu Ha; Valerie Ho	Mixed pair	—N/a			7.560	5

== Tennis ==
Canada qualified four tennis players (one man and three women). The team was officially named on October 4, 2023. Later Stacey Fung and Carol Zhao withdrew from the team, reducing the team size to two athletes (one male and one female).

Athlete	Event	Round of 64	Round of 32	Round of 16	Quarterfinals	Semifinals	Final / BM	
Athlete	Event	Opposition Score	Opposition Score	Opposition Score	Opposition Score	Opposition Score	Opposition Score	Rank
Justin Boulais	Men's singles	Bye	Kumar (USA); W 2–1 (4–6, 7–5, 6–4)	Heide (BRA); L 0–2 (3–6, 3–6)	Did not advance			
Rebecca Marino	Women's singles	Bye	Dominguez (EAI); W 2–0 (7–5, 6–2)	Iamachkine (PER); W 2–0 (6–4, 6–3)	Lizarazo (COL); W 2–1 (7–5, 4–6, 6–4)	Lourdes (ARG); L 0–2 (1–6, 4–6)	Bronze medal match Riera (ARG); L 1–2 (6–3, 4–6, 1–6)	4
Justin Boulais; Rebecca Marino	Mixed doubles	—N/a		Obando / Espinal (HON); W 2–0 (6–4, 6–2)	Demoliner / Stefani (BRA); L 1–2 (4–6, 3–6, [7–10])	Did not advance		

== Triathlon ==
Canada qualified a team of four triathletes (two men and two women) after finishing third at the 2023 Pan American Mixed Relays Championship. Canada also qualified one additional male and female quota, for a final team size of six athletes (three per gender). The team was officially named on September 14, 2023. The team named was a developmental team.

Individual

Athlete	Event	Swim (1.5 km)	Trans 1	Bike (40 km)	Trans 2	Run (10 km)	Total	Rank
Liam Donnelly	Men's	18:39	0:46	57:33	0:25	32:36	1:50:01	19
Brock Hoel	Men's	18:19	0:47	55:40	0:28	32:33	1:47:49	12
Martin Sobey	Men's	18:18	0:47	55:43	0:24	31:18	1:46:31	4
Dominika Jamnicky	Women's	19:34	0:51	1:01:54	0:29	35:43	1:58:33	5
Emy Legault	Women's	18:48	0:53	1:02:40	0:30	35:59	1:58:53	6
Desirae Ridenour	Women's	19:28	0:53	DNF				

Relay

Athlete	Event	Swimming (300 m)	Transition 1	Biking (6.6 km)	Transition2	Running (1.5 km)	Total	Leg rank	Rank
Brock Hoel	Mixed relay	3:17	0:43	8:18	0:21	4:28	17:07	1	—N/a
Emy Legault	Mixed relay	4:03	0:49	9:20	0:31	5:23	20:06	4	—N/a
Liam Donnelly	Mixed relay	3:44	0:43	8:42	0:20	4:24	17:53	2	—N/a
Dominika Jamnicky	Mixed relay	4:05	0:50	9:36	0:24	5:25	20:20	3	—N/a
Total	Mixed relay	—N/a						1:15:36	3rd place, bronze medalist(s)

== Water polo ==
Summary

Team	Event	Group stage				Quarterfinal	Semifinal	Final / BM / Pl.	
Team	Event	Opposition Result	Opposition Result	Opposition Result	Rank	Opposition Result	Opposition Result	Opposition Result	Rank
Canada men	Men's tournament	Chile; W 28–4	Cuba; W 29–7	Argentina; W 14–7	1 Q	Mexico; W 20–5	Brazil; L 12–13	Bronze medal match Argentina; L 10–12	4
Canada women	Women's tournament	Argentina; W 14–9	Cuba; W 24–3	Mexico; W 32–7	1 Q	Chile; W 33–2	Brazil; W 21–4	United States; L 11–20	2nd place, silver medalist(s)

=== Men's tournament ===
Canada automatically qualified a men's team (of 12 athletes).

Roster

Canada's roster of 12 athletes was officially named on September 28, 2023. Bryant Jourdie was the alternate and competed at the event.

- Jérémie Blanchard
- Nicolas Constantin-Bicari
- Jérémie Côté
- Bogdan Djerkovic
- Reuel D'Souza
- Aleksa Gardijan
- Leo Hachem
- Matthew Halajian
- Brody McKnight
- Jason O'Donnell
- Gaelan Patterson
- Milan Radenovic

Preliminary round

Pos	Team	Pld	W	PSW	PSL	L	GF	GA	GD	Pts	Qualification
1	Canada	3	3	0	0	0	71	18	+53	9	Quarterfinals
2	Argentina	3	2	0	0	1	43	21	+22	6	Quarterfinals
3	Cuba	3	1	0	0	2	24	58	−34	3	Quarterfinals
4	Chile (H)	3	0	0	0	3	16	57	−41	0	Quarterfinals

Source: Santiago 2023
Rules for classification: 1) points; 2) head-to-head points; 3) head-to-head goal difference; 4) head-to-head number of goals scored; 5) goal difference.
(H) Host

30 October 2023; 19:30	Report	Canada	28–4	Chile	Aquatic Center, Santiago; Referees: Teodoro de Brito (BRA); Arellano Jr (MEX)
30 October 2023; 19:30	Report	Score by quarters: 7–0, 7–2, 9–0, 5–2			Aquatic Center, Santiago; Referees: Teodoro de Brito (BRA); Arellano Jr (MEX)
30 October 2023; 19:30	Report	Halajian 5	Goals	four players 1	Aquatic Center, Santiago; Referees: Teodoro de Brito (BRA); Arellano Jr (MEX)

31 October 2023; 16:30	Report	Canada	29–7	Cuba	Aquatic Center, Santiago; Referees: Ohme (GER); Moller (ARG)
31 October 2023; 16:30	Report	Score by quarters: 5–1, 8–3, 8–3, 8-0			Aquatic Center, Santiago; Referees: Ohme (GER); Moller (ARG)
31 October 2023; 16:30	Report	Constantin-Bicari, Côté 6	Goals	Ponsa 4	Aquatic Center, Santiago; Referees: Ohme (GER); Moller (ARG)

1 November 2023; 16:30	Report	Argentina	7–14	Canada	Aquatic Center, Santiago; Referees: Harvey Hinds (CUW); David Gomez Pordomingo (ESP)
1 November 2023; 16:30	Report	Score by quarters: 3–4, 1–4, 1–3, 2–3			Aquatic Center, Santiago; Referees: Harvey Hinds (CUW); David Gomez Pordomingo (ESP)
1 November 2023; 16:30	Report	Veich 3	Goals	Constantin-Bicari 5	Aquatic Center, Santiago; Referees: Harvey Hinds (CUW); David Gomez Pordomingo (ESP)

Quarterfinals

2 November 2023; 19:30	Report	Mexico	5–20	Canada	Aquatic Center, Santiago; Referees: Germán Moller (ARG); Reynel Castillo (PUR)
2 November 2023; 19:30	Report	Score by quarters: 0–4, 3–7, 1–4, 1–5			Aquatic Center, Santiago; Referees: Germán Moller (ARG); Reynel Castillo (PUR)
2 November 2023; 19:30	Report	Estrada 3	Goals	Constantin-Bicari 5	Aquatic Center, Santiago; Referees: Germán Moller (ARG); Reynel Castillo (PUR)

Semifinals

3 November 2023; 18:00	Report	Brazil	13–12	Canada	Aquatic Center, Santiago; Referees: Harvey Hinds (CUW); David Gomez Pordomingo (ESP)
3 November 2023; 18:00	Report	Score by quarters: 3–3, 2–3, 3–3, 5–3			Aquatic Center, Santiago; Referees: Harvey Hinds (CUW); David Gomez Pordomingo (ESP)
3 November 2023; 18:00	Report	Guimarães, P. Real 3	Goals	Constantin-Bicari, Patterson 3	Aquatic Center, Santiago; Referees: Harvey Hinds (CUW); David Gomez Pordomingo (ESP)

Bronze medal match

4 November 2023; 19:00	Report	Canada	10–12	Argentina	Aquatic Center, Santiago; Referees: David Gomez Pordomingo (ESP); Darren Spirtosanto (USA)
4 November 2023; 19:00	Report	Score by quarters: 2–3, 1–3, 3–2, 4–4			Aquatic Center, Santiago; Referees: David Gomez Pordomingo (ESP); Darren Spirtosanto (USA)
4 November 2023; 19:00	Report	four players 2	Goals	Camnasio 3	Aquatic Center, Santiago; Referees: David Gomez Pordomingo (ESP); Darren Spirtosanto (USA)

=== Women's tournament ===
Canada automatically qualified a women's team (of 12 athletes).

Roster

Canada's roster of 12 athletes was officially named on September 28, 2023. Daphne Guevremont was the alternate and competed at the event.

- Verica Bakoc
- Serena Browne
- Floranne Carroll
- Axelle Crevier
- Jessica Gaudreault
- Rae Lekness
- Elyse Lemay-Lavoie
- Blaire McDowell
- Hayley McKelvey
- Kindred Paul
- Clara Vulpisi
- Emma Wright

Preliminary round

Pos	Team	Pld	W	PSW	PSL	L	GF	GA	GD	Pts	Qualification
1	Canada	3	3	0	0	0	70	19	+51	9	Quarterfinals
2	Argentina	3	1	1	0	1	35	37	−2	5	Quarterfinals
3	Cuba	3	1	0	1	1	34	53	−19	4	Quarterfinals
4	Mexico	3	0	0	0	3	24	54	−30	0	Quarterfinals

Source: Santiago 2023
Rules for classification: 1) points; 2) head-to-head points; 3) head-to-head goal difference; 4) head-to-head number of goals scored; 5) goal difference.

30 October 2023; 11:00	Report	Canada	14–9	Argentina	Aquatic Center, Santiago; Referees: Jose Garcia Soto (VEN); Reynel Castillo (USA)
30 October 2023; 11:00	Report	Score by quarters: 3–2, 6–1, 1–4, 4–2			Aquatic Center, Santiago; Referees: Jose Garcia Soto (VEN); Reynel Castillo (USA)
30 October 2023; 11:00	Report	Bakoc 4	Goals	Auliel, A. Bacigalupo 3	Aquatic Center, Santiago; Referees: Jose Garcia Soto (VEN); Reynel Castillo (USA)

31 October 2023; 8:00	Report	Canada	24–3	Cuba	Aquatic Center, Santiago; Referees: Harvey Hinds (CUW); Darren Spritosanto (USA)
31 October 2023; 8:00	Report	Score by quarters: 6–0, 7–0, 2–0, 9–3			Aquatic Center, Santiago; Referees: Harvey Hinds (CUW); Darren Spritosanto (USA)
31 October 2023; 8:00	Report	three players 4	Goals	three players 1	Aquatic Center, Santiago; Referees: Harvey Hinds (CUW); Darren Spritosanto (USA)

1 November 2023; 8:00	Report	Mexico	7–32	Canada	Aquatic Center, Santiago; Referees: Fernando Teodoro de Brito (BRA); Daniel Federico Daners (URU)
1 November 2023; 8:00	Report	Score by quarters: 2–7, 3–8, 1–8, 1–9			Aquatic Center, Santiago; Referees: Fernando Teodoro de Brito (BRA); Daniel Federico Daners (URU)
1 November 2023; 8:00	Report	Ramírez 3	Goals	Browne 5	Aquatic Center, Santiago; Referees: Fernando Teodoro de Brito (BRA); Daniel Federico Daners (URU)

Quarterfinals

2 November 2023; 11:00	Report	Canada	33–2	Chile	Aquatic Center, Santiago; Referees: Gerardo Arellano Jr (MEX); Jorge Rincon Patiño (COL)
2 November 2023; 11:00	Report	Score by quarters: 4–0, 9–0, 10–2, 10–0			Aquatic Center, Santiago; Referees: Gerardo Arellano Jr (MEX); Jorge Rincon Patiño (COL)
2 November 2023; 11:00	Report	Bakoc 7	Goals	I. del Villar, S. del Villar 1	Aquatic Center, Santiago; Referees: Gerardo Arellano Jr (MEX); Jorge Rincon Patiño (COL)

Semifinals

3 November 2023; 12:30	Report	Brazil	4–21	Canada	Aquatic Center, Santiago; Referees: Jose Garcia Soto (VEN); Reynel Castillo Torres (PUR)
3 November 2023; 12:30	Report	Score by quarters: 3–7, 0–5, 1–3, 0–6			Aquatic Center, Santiago; Referees: Jose Garcia Soto (VEN); Reynel Castillo Torres (PUR)
3 November 2023; 12:30	Report	Belorio 2	Goals	Lemay-Lavoie 6	Aquatic Center, Santiago; Referees: Jose Garcia Soto (VEN); Reynel Castillo Torres (PUR)

Gold medal match

4 November 2023; 12:30	Report	United States	20–11	Canada	Aquatic Center, Santiago; Referees: Jose Garcia Soto (VEN); German Moller (ARG)
4 November 2023; 12:30	Report	Score by quarters: 5–3, 5–4, 6–2, 4–2			Aquatic Center, Santiago; Referees: Jose Garcia Soto (VEN); German Moller (ARG)
4 November 2023; 12:30	Report	Fattal, Flynn 5	Goals	McKelvey 4	Aquatic Center, Santiago; Referees: Jose Garcia Soto (VEN); German Moller (ARG)

== Water skiing ==
Canada qualified two wakeboarders (one of each gender) during the 2022 Pan American Championship. Canada also qualified four water skiers during the 2022 Pan American Water skiing Championship. The team of six athletes (two men and four women) was officially named on September 15, 2023.

Waterski and Wakeboard
Men

Athlete	Event	Preliminary	Rank	LCQ	Rank	Final	Rank
Dorien Llewellyn	Jump	63.5	2 Q	—N/a		64.5	2nd place, silver medalist(s)
Dorien Llewellyn	Slalom	3.50/58/11.25	=9	—N/a		Did not advance	
Dorien Llewellyn	Tricks	10370	4 Q	—N/a		10690	2nd place, silver medalist(s)
Hunter Smith	Wakeboard	70.22	2 Q	Bye		82.67	2nd place, silver medalist(s)

Women

Athlete	Event	Preliminary	Rank	LCQ	Rank	Final	Rank
Whitney McClintock	Slalom	2.00/55/10.75	=2	—N/a		Did not advance	
Paige Rini	Jump	45.9	3 Q	—N/a		47.3	3rd place, bronze medalist(s)
Paige Rini	Slalom	2.00/55/10.75	=2 Q	—N/a		1.00/55/10.75	3rd place, bronze medalist(s)
Paige Rini	Tricks	8410	5 Q	—N/a		7160	6
Neilly Ross	Slalom	2.00/55/10.75	=2 Q	—N/a		3.00/55/10.75	2nd place, silver medalist(s)
Neilly Ross	Tricks	10430	2 Q	—N/a		10870	2nd place, silver medalist(s)
Ashley Leugner	Wakeboard	58.33	3 LL	75.00	2 Q	40.00	5

Water ski Overall

Athlete	Event	Preliminary	Rank	Slalom	Ov. Slalom	Trick	Ov. Trick	Jump	Ov. Jump	Overall	Rank
Dorien Llewellyn	Men's overall	2,667.20	1 Q	3.00/58/10.75	980.77	11000	1000.00	63.9	989.82	2970.59	1st place, gold medalist(s)
Paige Rini	Women's overall	2,595.22	2 Q	2.00/55/10.75	897.96	8890	838.68	46.5	875.37	2612.01	2nd place, silver medalist(s)

== Weightlifting ==
Canada qualified six weightlifters (three per gender). The final team of six weightlifters was officially named on September 25, 2023.

Athlete	Event	Snatch		Clean & Jerk		Total	
Athlete	Event	Result	Rank	Result	Rank	Result	Rank
Nicolas Vachon	Men's 73 kg	134	7	NM		DSQ	
Alex Bellemarre	Men's 89 kg	165	3	191	5	356	4
Noah Santavy	Men's 102 kg	150	10	185	9	335	10
Amanda Braddock	Women's 49 kg	74	5	91	4	165	4
Maude Charron	Women's 59 kg	101	2	125	2	226	2nd place, silver medalist(s)
Maya Laylor	Women's 81 kg	102	6	135	2	237	4

== Wrestling ==
Canada qualified 11 wrestlers (six men and five women) through the 2022 Pan American Wrestling Championships and the 2023 Pan American Wrestling Championships. Canada's team of 11 athletes was officially named on August 3, 2023. Later Lachlan McNeil, Darthe Capellan, Ana Godinez and Amar Dhesi all withdrew from the team, bringing the team size down to seven wrestlers (three men and four women). Justina Di Stasio and Alex Moore were also replaced by Shauna Kuebeck and Hunter Lee respectively due to injury. The Canadian wrestling team finished with five medals, one silver and four bronze.

Men

Athlete	Event	Round of 16	Quarterfinal	Semifinal	Repechage	Final / BM	
Athlete	Event	Opposition Result	Opposition Result	Opposition Result	Opposition Result	Opposition Result	Rank
Adam Thomson	Freestyle 74 kg	Bye	Maren (CUB); L 4–4 (VPO1)	Did not advance	—N/a	Bronze medal final Barrios (HON); W 6–5 (VPO1)	3rd place, bronze medalist(s)
Hunter Lee	Freestyle 86 kg	Bye	Hall (USA); L 2–12 (VSU1)	Did not advance	Bye	Bronze medal final Ramos (PUR); W 14–4 (VSU1)	3rd place, bronze medalist(s)
Nishan Randhawa	Freestyle 97 kg	Baez (ARG); W 14–4 (VSU1)	Snyder (USA); L 0–10 (VSU)	Did not advance	—N/a	Bronze medal final Lacey (CRC); W 7–6 (VPO1)	3rd place, bronze medalist(s)

Women

Athlete	Event	Round of 16	Quarterfinal	Semifinal	Repechage	Final / BM	
Athlete	Event	Opposition Result	Opposition Result	Opposition Result	Opposition Result	Opposition Result	Rank
Madison Parks	Freestyle 50 kg	Did not start					
Hannah Taylor	Freestyle 57 kg	Bye	Valverde (ECU); W 12–3 (VFA)	Sarco (VEN); W 3–2 (VFA)	Bye	Penalber (BRA); L 6–7 (VPO1)	2nd place, silver medalist(s)
Olivia Di Bacco	Freestyle 68 kg	Bye	Caraballo (VEN); L 6–6 (VFA)	Did not advance	Bye	Bronze medal final Garnica (MEX); W 8–6 (VPO1)	3rd place, bronze medalist(s)
Shauna Kuebeck	Freestyle 76 kg	Bye	Marín (CUB); L 0–10 (VSU)	Did not advance	Machuca (ARG); W 2–8 (VFA)	Bronze medal final Acosta (VEN); L 0–3 (VFA)	=5

== Non-competing sports ==
=== Basketball ===
Canada qualified a men's team (of 12 athletes) by finishing fourth in the 2022 FIBA Americup. However, the spot was declined. Canada qualified a women's team (of 12 athletes) after finishing third at the 2023 FIBA Women's AmeriCup. However, the spot was declined. Canada also qualified both 3x3 teams, but neither team was sent.

=== Football (soccer) ===
Canada qualified a women's team of 18 athletes by finishing 2nd in the 2022 CONCACAF W Championship. However, the team was withdrawn and did compete, after Soccer Canada cited 'scheduling issues'.

=== Volleyball ===
Canada's men's team qualified for the games, however did not compete.

== See also ==
- Canada at the 2023 Parapan American Games
- Canada at the 2024 Summer Olympics
