= Bowling at the 2023 Pan American Games – Men's doubles =

Men's doubles at the 2023 Pan American Games
- Venue: Bowling Center
- Dates: November 2
- Competitors: 24 from 12 nations
- Winning score: 3511

Medalists
Gold medal	Donald Lee; William Duen	Panama
Silver medal	Michel Hupé; François Lavoie	Canada
Bronze medal	Juan Rodríguez; Marco Moretti	Costa Rica

The men's doubles competition of the bowling events at the 2023 Pan American Games was held on November 2 at the Bowling Center in La Florida, Chile.

== Schedule ==
Date	Time	Round
November 2, 2023	14:00	Final

== Results ==
The results were as follows:

Rank	Nation	Athlete	Total	Grand Total
1st place, gold medalist(s)	Panama	Donald Lee; William Duen	1747; 1764	3511
2nd place, silver medalist(s)	Canada	Michel Hupé; François Lavoie	1647; 1788	3435
3rd place, bronze medalist(s)	Costa Rica	Juan Rodríguez; Marco Moretti	1689; 1741	3430
4	Puerto Rico	Cristian Azcona; Israel Hernández	1702; 1615	3317
5	Dominican Republic	Rolando Sebelen; Wascar Cavallo	1641; 1636	3277
6	Venezuela	Rodolfo Monacelli; Luis Rovaina	1608; 1628	3236
7	Brazil	Bruno Soares; Marcelo Suartz	1567; 1655	3222
8	Colombia	Felipe Gil; Sebastián Salazar	1610; 1581	3191
9	United States	A.J. Johnson; Brandon Bonta	1645; 1526	3171
10	Ecuador	Gustavo Wong; Raúl Ayala	1550; 1598	3148
11	Independent Athletes Team	Diego Aguilar; Marvin León	1445; 1578	3023
12	Chile	Patricio Borquez; Jesús Borgeaud	1474; 1458	2932
