= Oliver Scholfield =

Canadian field hockey player (born 1993)

Oliver Scholfield OLY
Personal information
- Full name: Oliver William Scholfield
- Born: September 11, 1993 (age 33) Scarborough, Ontario
- Height: 1.80 m (5 ft 11 in)

Sport
- Sport: Field hockey
- Position: Forward
- Club: Vancouver Hawks
National team
Years	Team	Caps	Goals
2012–2013	Canada U21	12	-
2014–present	Canada	71	(16)
Medal record
Men's field hockey
Representing Canada
Pan American Games
Silver medal – second place	2019 Lima	Team
Bronze medal – third place	2023 Santiago	Team
Pan American Cup
Silver medal – second place	2017 Lancaster
Bronze medal – third place	2022 Santiago
- Updated on 24 July 2021

Oliver William Scholfield (born September 11, 1993) is a Canadian field hockey player who plays as a forward for the Vancouver Hawks and the Canadian national team.

== International career ==
Scholfield made his debut for the senior national team in 2014. He represented Canada at the 2018 World Cup, where he played all four games. In June 2019, he was selected in the Canada squad for the 2019 Pan American Games. They won the silver medal as they lost 5–2 to Argentina in the final.

In June 2021, Scholfield was named to Canada's 2020 Summer Olympics team.
