= Brayden Taivassalo =

Canadian swimmer (born 2004)

Personal information
- National team: Canada
- Born: August 20, 2004 (age 22) Newmarket, Ontario

Sport
- Sport: Swimming
- Strokes: Breaststroke
- Club: Newmarket Stingrays, Markham Aquatic Club
- College team: Texas
Medal record
Men's swimming
Representing Canada
Pan American Games
Silver medal – second place	2023 Santiago	200 m breaststroke

Brayden Taivassalo (born August 20, 2004) is a Canadian swimmer who competes in the men's breaststroke. He won the silver medal in the men's 200 m breaststroke at the 2023 Pan American Games in Santiago. He swam at the 2023 World Aquatics Championships in Japan, finishing in 30th place.
