= Mio Narita =

Japanese swimmer (born 2006)

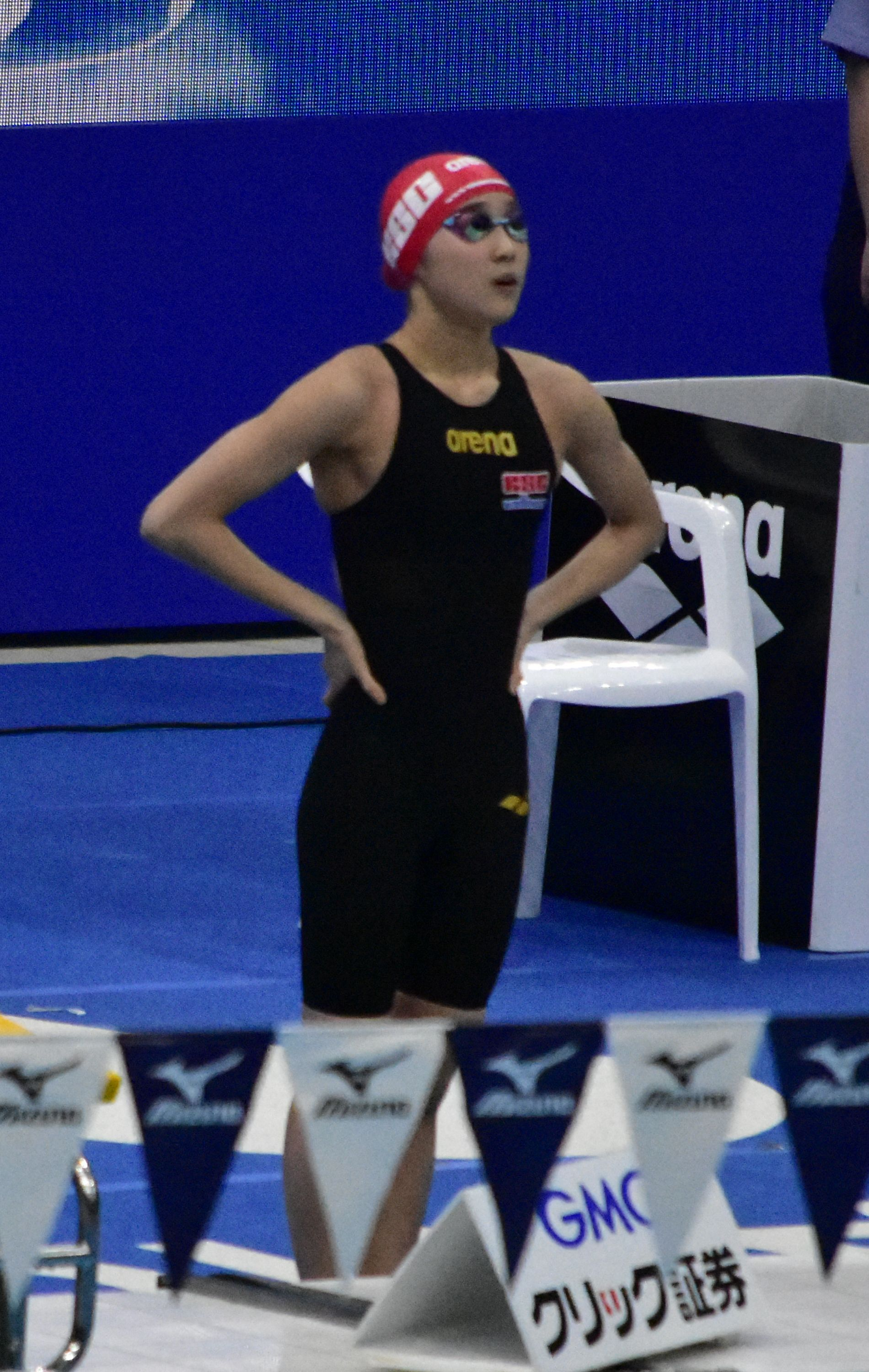

Personal information
- Native name: 成田実生
- National team: Japan
- Born: 18 December 2006 (age 19) Tokyo, Japan
- Height: 160 cm (5 ft 3 in)

Sport
- Sport: Swimming
- Strokes: Individual medley, backstroke
Medal record
Women's swimming
Representing Japan
Event	1st	2nd	3rd
World Championships (LC)	0	1	0
Asian Games	0	1	2
World Junior Championships	3	0	0
Junior Pan Pac Championships	2	1	0
Total	5	3	2
World Championships (LC)
Silver medal – second place	2025 Singapore	400 m medley
Asian Games
Silver medal – second place	2022 Hangzhou	4x200 m freestyle
Bronze medal – third place	2022 Hangzhou	400 m medley
Bronze medal – third place	2026 Aichi–Nagoya	200 m medley
Bronze medal – third place	2026 Aichi–Nagoya	400 m medley
World Junior Championships
Gold medal – first place	2022 Lima	200 m medley
Gold medal – first place	2022 Lima	400 m medley
Gold medal – first place	2022 Lima	4×100 m medley
Junior Pan Pac Championships
Gold medal – first place	2022 Honolulu	200 m medley
Gold medal – first place	2022 Honolulu	400 m medley
Silver medal – second place	2022 Honolulu	200 m backstroke

Mio Narita (成田 実生, Narita Mio; born 18 December 2006) is a Japanese competitive swimmer. She is the 2022 World Junior champion and 2022 Junior Pan Pacific champion in both the 200-metre individual medley and the 400-metre individual medley. She is a former world junior record holder in the 400-metre individual medley.

== Career ==
=== 2022 ===
On 3 March 2022, at the selection meet for swimmers to represent Japan at the 2022 World Aquatics Championships, Narita set a new world junior record in the 400-metre individual medley with a time of 4:36.71, which followed the record of 4:38.53 established in 2019 by Alba Vázquez of Spain, and did not qualify for the senior World Championships.

==== 2022 Junior Pan Pacific Championships ====
At the 2022 Junior Pan Pacific Swimming Championships, held at Veterans Memorial Aquatic Center in Honolulu, United States, Narita won the gold medal in the 400-metre individual medley with a Championships record time of 4:36.79, finishing over six seconds ahead of silver medalist Kayla Han of the United States. She also won the gold medal in the 200-metre individual medley, with a time of 2:11.22, and the silver medal in the 200-metre backstroke, with a time of 2:09.67. Based upon point allocations for each placing by athletes in their individual events at the Championships, Narita ranked as the second highest scoring female competitor, behind American Erin Gemmell, and fourth highest scoring overall competitor, behind Erin Gemmell and Australian male swimmers Joshua Staples and Flynn Southam.

==== 2022 World Junior Championships ====
2022 World Junior Championships
Gold medal – first place	400 m individual medley	4:37.78 (CR)
Gold medal – first place	200 m individual medley	2:11.68
Gold medal – first place	4×100 m medley	4:06.44

Starting competition on day one at the 2022 FINA World Junior Swimming Championships, held in Lima, Peru starting three days after the end of the Junior Pan Pacific Championships, Narita ranked first in the preliminaries of the 400-metre individual medley with a 4:45.29 and qualified for the final. She maintained a leading edge of approximately 14 seconds in the final, which corresponded to sixth-place finisher Vivien Jackl of Hungary, achieving a new Championship record time of 4:37.78 and winning the gold medal. Two days later, she ranked second in the preliminaries of the 200-metre backstroke, only behind Dóra Molnár of Hungary, with a time of 2:12.05, and advanced to the final. For her performance in the final, she finished 0.01 seconds behind bronze medalist Laura Bernat of Poland with a 2:11.10 to place fourth.

The next day, Narita ranked first in the preliminaries of the 200-metre individual medley with a 2:14.74, which was 9.00 seconds faster than eighth-rank and last final qualifier Jimena Leguizamón of Colombia. In the final later the same day, she won the gold medal with a time of 2:11.68, finishing 2.06 seconds ahead of bronze medalist Emma Carrasco of Spain. Two days later, she split a 1:11.68 for the breaststroke leg of the 4×100-metre medley relay in the preliminaries, helping qualify the relay to the final ranking second with a time of 4:10.41. On the finals relay, she switched strokes, splitting a 56.17 for the freestyle leg of the relay to help win the gold medal in a time of 4:06.44.

==== End of the year championships ====
On 22 October, Narita won the gold medal in the 400-metre individual medley at the 2022 Japan Short Course Championships in Tokyo, and conducted in short course metres, with a personal best time of 4:29.70. The next day, she won the silver medal in the 200-metre individual medley with a personal best time of 2:07.25. As of mid-November, her 4:29.70 in the 400-metre individual medley ranked fifth amongst female swimmers globally for the year. Later in the year, in December at the 2022 Japan Open Swimming Championships conducted in long course metres in Tokyo, she won the gold medal in the 400-metre individual medley with a time of 4:37.32. On 3 December, the following day, she won the gold medal in the 200-metre individual medley with a time of 2:12.23.

=== 2023 ===
In January 2023, Narita competed at the 2023 South Australia State Open Championships in Adelaide, Australia, winning the 200-metre backstroke with a 2:13.59 and the 200-metre individual medley with a 2:14.34. The following month, she won the 400-metre individual medley at the 2023 Konami Open in Chiba Prefecture, finishing in a meet record time of 4:37.59. The second of two days, she won the 200-metre individual medley with a personal best and meet record time of 2:11.10. In March, she won the short course 200-metre individual medley final heat open to 15 and 16 year old girls at the 45th Japan Junior Spring Olympic Cup in a meet record time of 2:08.28.

On the first morning of the 2023 Japan Swim in April in Tokyo, Narita qualified for the final of the 200-metre individual medley with a time of 2:13.45 and overall rank of second in the preliminaries. Later in the day, she won the gold medal in the final with a personal best and 2023 World Aquatics Championships and 2022 Asian Games qualifying time of 2:10.91. The sixth and final morning, she ranked first in the preliminaries of the 400-metre individual medley, qualifying for the final with a time of 4:41.28. She won the gold medal in the final by 1.01 seconds with a time of 4:36.89. The following month, she won the bronze medal in the 200-metre individual medley with a time of 2:11.93 at the 2023 Mare Nostrum stop in Canet-en-Roussillon, France, where she was the only female junior swimmer (born 2005 or more recent) to qualify for the a-final. She upped her placing to second in the final of the 400-metre individual medley, winning the silver medal with a 4:42.84. Four days later, she won the gold medal in the 400-metre individual medley at the stop of the Mare Nostrum in Barcelona, Spain, with a time of 4:39.22.

== International championships ==
Meet	200 backstroke	200 individual medley	400 individual medley	4×100 medley relay
PACJ 2022 (age: 15)	(silver) (2:09.67)	(gold) (2:11.22)	(gold) (4:36.79 CR)	
WJC 2022 (age: 15)	4th (2:11.10)	(gold) (2:11.68)	(gold) (4:37.78 CR)	(gold) (h - split 1:11.68, br leg; f - split 56.17, fr leg)

== Personal best times ==
=== Long course metres (50 m pool) ===
Event	Time	Meet	Location	Date	Age	Notes	Ref
200 m backstroke	2:09.67	2022 Junior Pan Pacific Championships	Honolulu, United States	26 August 2022	15		
200 m individual medley	2:10.91	2023 Japan Swim	Tokyo	4 April 2023	16		
400 m individual medley	4:36.71	2022 Japan Selection Meet	Tokyo	3 March 2022	15	Former WJ	

Legend: e – equalled existing record; WJ – World Junior record;
Records not set in finals: h – heat; sf – semifinal; r – relay 1st leg; rh – relay heat 1st leg; b – B final; † – en route to final mark; so – swim-off; tt – time trial

=== Short course metres (25 m pool) ===
Event	Time	Meet	Location	Date	Age	Ref
200 m individual medley	2:07.25	2022 Japan Short Course Championships	Tokyo	23 October 2022	15	
400 m individual medley	4:29.70	2022 Japan Short Course Championships	Tokyo	22 October 2022	15	

== Records ==
=== World junior records ===
==== Long course metres (50 m pool) ====
No.	Event	Time	Meet	Location	Date	Age	Status	Ref
1	400 m individual medley	4:36.71	2022 Japan Selection Meet	Tokyo	3 March 2022	15 years, 75 days	Former	
