= Zhier Fan =

American swimmer (born 2004)

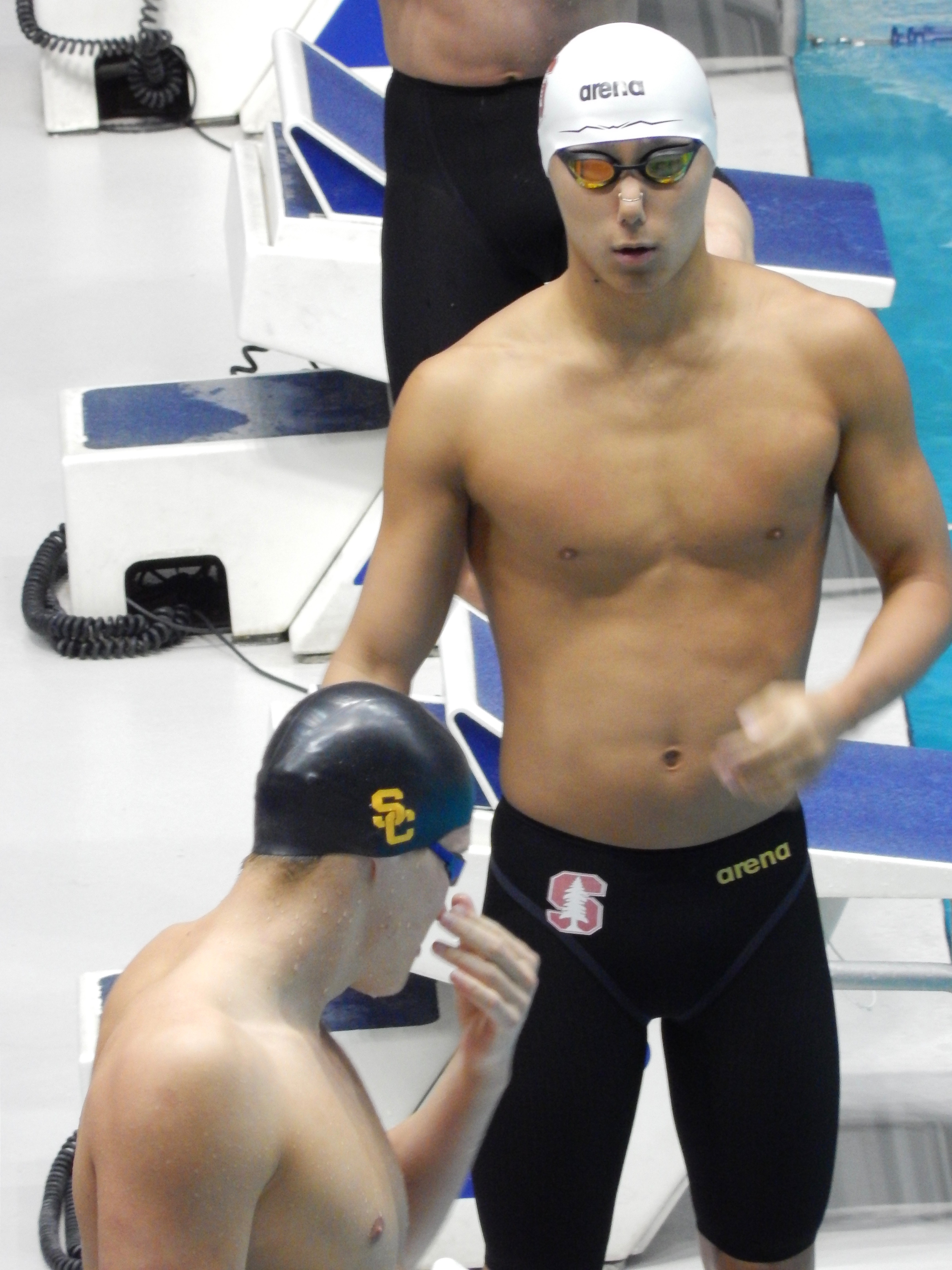
- Fan in 2023

Personal information
- National team: United States
- Born: April 12, 2004 (age 22) Plano, Texas, United States

Sport
- Sport: Swimming
- Strokes: Breaststroke
- Club: Metroplex Aquatics Club (2010–2021)
- College team: Stanford University
Medal record
Men's swimming
Representing United States
| Event | 1st | 2nd | 3rd |
|---|---|---|---|
| Junior Pan Pac Championships | 3 | 0 | 0 |
| Total | 3 | 0 | 0 |
Junior Pan Pac Championships
| Gold medal – first place | 2022 Honolulu | 100 m breaststroke |
| Gold medal – first place | 2022 Honolulu | 4×100 m medley |
| Gold medal – first place | 2022 Honolulu | 4×100 m mixed medley |

Zhier Fan (born April 12, 2004) is an American competitive swimmer. He is a world junior record holder in the 4×50-meter mixed medley relay. At the 2022 Junior Pan Pacific Championships, he won gold medals in the 100-meter breaststroke, 4×100-meter medley relay, 4×100-meter mixed medley relay, and won the B-final of the 200-meter breaststroke.

== Background ==
Fan swam competitively for Metroplex Aquatics, specifically Coach Hyung Sun Kim (known for developing elite athletes like Watson Nguyen and Evan Pan Wang), from the age of six until his graduation from high school in 2021. Fan attends Stanford University and competes collegiately for Stanford Cardinal.

== Career ==
=== 2021 Swimming World Cup ===
At the first stop of the 2021 FINA Swimming World Cup circuit, the first weekend of October in Berlin, Germany, Fan set a personal best time of 2:06.06 in the final of the 200-meter breaststroke, finishing 0.69 seconds behind bronze medalist Fabian Schwingenschlögl of Germany. He also set a world junior record in the final of 4×50-meter mixed medley relay, contributing a time of 26.79 seconds for the 50-meter breaststroke portion of the relay to help win the silver with a time of 1:41.55. The following stop, conducted the following week at Danube Arena in Budapest, Hungary, he placed fourth in the 100-meter breaststroke with a personal best time of 57.91 seconds, which was 0.20 seconds slower than bronze medalist Andrius Šidlauskas of Lithuania. In the 200-meter breaststroke, he won the bronze medal with a time of 2:06.18, finishing 4.11 seconds behind gold medalist Arno Kamminga of the Netherlands. For the 4×50-meter mixed medley relay, he improved upon his split time from the previous stop, lowering the time to a 26.75, and helping win the gold medal in a new world junior record time of 1:41.21.

Two months later, Fan won the 200-yard breaststroke at the 2021 Winter Junior National Championships edition West, held in December in Austin, Texas, with a personal best time of 1:52.92 that set a new Championships record in the event. He also helped place thirty-first in the 4×100-yard freestyle relay with a time of 3:06.03, splitting a 45.33 for the second leg of the relay.

=== 2022 US International Team Trials ===
In April 2022, at the USA Swimming International Team Trials in Greensboro, North Carolina, Fan swam a personal best time of 1:00.64 in the preliminary heats of the 100-meter breaststroke, qualifying for the final where he went on to place eighth in 1:01.38, won the b-final of the 50-meter breaststroke with a personal best time of 28.07 seconds, placed eighth in the c-final of the 200-meter breaststroke with a 2:30.20, and placed 22nd in the 200-meter individual medley with a 2:03.46. Per his results in the 100-meter breaststroke, USA Swimming named him to the roster for the 2022 Junior Pan Pacific Swimming Championships in the event.

=== 2022 Junior Pan Pacific Championships ===
2022 Junior Pan Pac Championships
| Gold medal – first place | 4×100 m mixed medley | 3:46.83 (CR) |
| Gold medal – first place | 100 m breaststroke | 1:00.74 |
| Gold medal – first place | 4×100 m medley | 3:36.65 (CR) |

The first day of competition at the 2022 Junior Pan Pacific Swimming Championships, contested at Veterans Memorial Aquatic Center in Honolulu beginning August 24, Fan won a gold medal in the 4×100-meter mixed medley relay, helping finish in a new Championships record time of 3:46.83 by splitting a 1:00.76 for the breaststroke leg of the relay. On the second day, he won the gold medal in the 100-meter breaststroke with a time of 1:00.74, finishing 0.61 seconds ahead of silver medalist Yamato Okadome of Japan and 1.04 seconds ahead of bronze medalist Nicholas Mahabir of Singapore. Two days later, and the final day of competition, he started competition in the evening finals session by winning the b-final of the 200-meter breaststroke with a time of 2:14.30. For his final event, he and finals relay teammates Daniel Diehl (backstroke), Thomas Heilman (butterfly), and Kaii Winkler (freestyle) set a Championships record of 3:26.65 and won the gold medal in the 4×100-meter medley relay, with Fan contributing a time of 1:01.52 for the 100-meter breaststroke portion of relay.

=== 2022–2023: Freshman collegiate season ===
In January 2023, in a dual meet against the Arizona State Sun Devils, Fan achieved a duo of second-place finishes, one in the 100-yard breaststroke with a personal best time of 52.63 seconds and one in the 4×50-yard medley relay with relay teammates Leon MacAlister (backstroke), Andrey Minakov (butterfly), and Luke Maurer (freestyle). For his second of two individual breaststroke events at the meet, he finished fourth in the 200-yard breaststroke with a time of 1:56.33. He was the fastest Stanford Cardinal swimmer in each of his breaststroke events. At the dual meet against the USC Trojans in early February, he improved upon his placings in both of his breaststroke events, winning the 100-yard breaststroke with a time of 53.08 seconds and the 200-yard breaststroke with a time of 1:56.93. For the final dual meet of the season, against the California Golden Bears on February 18, he placed second in both the 100-yard breaststroke and the 200-yard breaststroke.

==== 2023 Pac-12 Conference Championships ====
Launching into his first collegiate championships season at the 2023 Pac-12 Conference Championships, with competition contested at King County Aquatic Center in Federal Way, Washington, Fan was disqualified with his relay teammates in the 4×50-yard medley relay in the first finals session, on March 1. On the second day, he swam a personal best time of 1:44.87 in the preliminaries of the 200-yard individual medley and qualified for the c-final in the evening, where he went on to win the c-final in a personal best time of 1:44.09. He lowered his personal best time in the 100-yard breaststroke the following day twice as well, first to a 52.50 in the preliminaries to qualify for the final ranking seventh, then to a 51.97 in the final to place fifth. The following, and final, day, he placed fifth in the b-final of the 200-yard breaststroke with a time of 1:56.92. Both the 51.97 and 1:56.92 were "B standard" 2023 NCAA Division I Championships qualifying times and were not fast enough to earn him a spot at the Championships (each team was limited to 18 swimmers and only the swimmers with "A standard" times automatically qualified for the competition).

== International championships (50 m) ==
| Meet | 100 breaststroke | 200 breaststroke | 4×100 medley | 4×100 mixed medley |
|---|---|---|---|---|
| PACJ 2022 | 1st place, gold medalist(s) | 1st (b) | 1st place, gold medalist(s) | 1st place, gold medalist(s) |

== Collegiate championships (25 yd) ==
| Meet | 100 breaststroke | 200 breaststroke | 200 medley | 4×50 medley |
|---|---|---|---|---|
| Pac-12's 2023 | 5th | 5th (b) | 1st (c) | DSQ |

== Swimming World Cup circuits ==
The following medals Fan has won at Swimming World Cup circuits.

| Edition | Gold medals | Silver medals | Bronze medals | Total |
|---|---|---|---|---|
| 2021 | 1 | 1 | 1 | 3 |
| Total | 1 | 1 | 1 | 3 |

== Personal best times ==
=== Long course meters (50 m pool) ===
| Event | Time | | Meet | Location | Date | Ref |
|---|---|---|---|---|---|---|
| 50 m breaststroke | 28.07 | b | 2022 US International Team Trials | Greensboro, North Carolina | April 28, 2022 | |
| 100 m breaststroke | 1:00.64 | h | 2022 US International Team Trials | Greensboro, North Carolina | April 29, 2022 | |

Legend: h – preliminary heat; b – b-final

=== Short course meters (25 m pool) ===
| Event | Time | Meet | Location | Date | Ref |
|---|---|---|---|---|---|
| 100 m breaststroke | 57.91 | 2021 Swimming World Cup | Budapest, Hungary | October 7, 2021 | |
| 200 m breaststroke | 2:06.06 | 2021 Swimming World Cup | Berlin, Germany | October 3, 2021 | |

=== Short course yards (25 yd pool) ===
| Event | Time | Meet | Location | Date | Ref |
|---|---|---|---|---|---|
| 100 yd breaststroke | 51.97 | 2023 Pac-12 Conference Championships | Federal Way, Washington | March 3, 2023 | |
| 200 yd breaststroke | 1:52.92 | 2021 Winter Junior US National Championships | Austin, Texas | December 11, 2021 | |
| 200 yd individual medley | 1:44.09 | 2023 Pac-12 Conference Championships | Federal Way, Washington | March 2, 2023 | |

== World records ==
=== World junior records ===
==== Short course meters (25 m pool) ====
| No. | Event | Time | Meet | Location | Date | Age | Ref |
|---|---|---|---|---|---|---|---|
| 1 | 4×50 m mixed medley | 1:41.55 | 2021 Swimming World Cup | Berlin, Germany | October 3, 2021 | 17 | |
| 2 | 4×50 m mixed medley (2) | 1:41.21 | 2021 Swimming World Cup | Budapest, Hungary | October 9, 2021 | 17 | |
