= Kaii Winkler =

American swimmer (born 2006)

Personal information
- Full name: Kaii Liam Winkler
- National team: Germany
- Born: March 27, 2006 (age 20) Florida, United States
- Height: 1.97 m (6 ft 6 in)

Sport
- Sport: Swimming
- Strokes: Freestyle
- Club: South Florida HEAT; Eagle Aquatics
- College team: North Carolina State University
- Coach: Braden Holloway
Medal record
Men's swimming
Representing United States
Event	1st	2nd	3rd
Junior Pan Pac Championships	1	2	0
Total	1	2	0
Junior Pan Pac Championships
Gold medal – first place	2022 Honolulu	4×100 m freestyle
Gold medal – first place	2022 Honolulu	4×100 m medley
Silver medal – second place	2022 Honolulu	50 m freestyle

Kaii Liam Winkler (born 2006) is a German-American competitive swimmer who swam for North Carolina State University and represented Germany in the 100-meter butterfly at the 2024 Paris Olympics, finishing 28th. He is a world junior record holder in the long course 4×100-meter freestyle relay. At the 2022 Junior Pan Pacific Championships, he won gold medals in the 4×100-meter freestyle relay and 4×100-meter medley relay, as well as a silver medal in the 50-meter freestyle. Since 2024, he represents team Germany internationally.

== Early life ==
Winkler was homeschooled for high school, part of Broward Virtual School, and competed for the South Florida HEAT. As a Junior, he was a First Team All-Broward swimmer representing the South Florida HEAT Swim Club in the 200 freestyle with a state record time of 1:34.18 and a Florida state champion in the 100 freestyle with a state record time of 42.52. Swimming anchor for both events, he was a Florida State Champion runner-up with a time of 3:03.74 in the 4x100 freestyle, and also a runner up in the 200 medley relay with a time of 1:30.85. He was made a 2023 Broward "Swimmer of the Year". He has a brother, Finn who is one year older, and was also a competitive swimmer for the South Florida Heat.

== Career ==
=== 2021–2022 ===
At his first Florida High School 1A State Championships in the autumn of 2021, Winkler placed second in the 100-yard freestyle with a time of 44.00 seconds and second in the 200-yard freestyle with a time of 1:36.78. In March the following year, he became the fastest American 15-year-old swimmer in history in the long course 100-meter freestyle with a time of 50.24 seconds at the 2022 Piranhas Senior Invitational in Florida. In April, at the 2022 USA Swimming International Team Trials held in Greensboro, North Carolina, he placed fourth in the c-final of the 100-meter freestyle with a time of 49.95 seconds and 33rd in the 200-meter freestyle with a 1:52.05. The next month, USA Swimming selected him to the 2022 Junior Pan Pacific Swimming Championships roster in the 100-meter freestyle based on his results at the International Team Trials.

==== 2022 Junior Pan Pacific Championships ====
2022 Junior Pan Pac Championships
Gold medal – first place	4×100 m freestyle	3:15.79 (WJ, CR)
Gold medal – first place	4×100 m medley	3:36.65 (CR)
Silver medal – second place	50 m freestyle	22.50

Day one of four at the 2022 Junior Pan Pacific Swimming Championships, held in August and contested at Veterans Memorial Aquatic Center in Honolulu, Winkler placed fourth in the b-final of the 200-meter freestyle with a time of 1:50.81 after swimming a personal best time of 1:50.07 in the preliminary heats. On the second day, he placed second in the b-final of the 100-meter freestyle with a 50.12, after swimming a personal best time of 49.47 seconds in the preliminary heats, and contributed a split of 1:51.27 for the fourth leg of the 4×200-meter freestyle relay to help win the exhibition heat with a time of 7:22.66.

In his first event of the evening session on day three, Winkler won the b-final of the 100-meter butterfly with a personal best time of 53.94 seconds. Later in the session, he split a 48.95 for the anchor, fourth, leg of the 4×100-meter freestyle relay in the final to help win the gold medal and set a new world junior record and Championships record of 3:15.79 with finals relay teammates Thomas Heilman, Henry McFadden, and Daniel Diehl. The following, and final, day, he tied fellow American Diggory Dillingham for the silver medal in the 50-meter freestyle with a personal best time of 22.50 seconds. In the 4×100-meter medley relay final, he and relay teammates Daniel Diehl (backstroke), Zhier Fan (breaststroke), and Thomas Heilman (butterfly), won the gold medal with a Championships record time of 3:36.65. He contributed a split time of 49.18 seconds for the freestyle leg of the relay.

==== 2022 U.S. Open Championships ====
Leading up to the year's U.S. Open, Winkler competed at the 2022 Florida 1A High School State Championships in Stuart, Florida, where he won the 100-yard freestyle with a National Age Group record time of 42.52 seconds for the boys 15–16 age group on November 18, which was 0.15 seconds faster than the former record by Ryan Hoffer in 2014. He also won the state title in the 200-yard freestyle, in which he set a Florida high school record with a 1:34.18.

At the 2022 U.S. Open Swimming Championships, held in November and December in Greensboro, North Carolina, Winkler tied for nineteenth-place in the 50-meter freestyle on day two with a time of 22.97 seconds, which qualified him for the c-final. He lowered his time to a 22.82 in the evening to win the c-final. The following day, he swam a 1:50.97 in the preliminary heats of the 200-meter freestyle to qualify for the b-final ranking eleventh across all preliminary heats. Improving his time in the evening finals session, he won the b-final with a time of 1:50.26, which was 2.88 seconds slower than a-final winner Jake Mitchell. For his final event, the 100-meter freestyle on day four, he ranked seventh in the preliminary heats and qualified for the a-final with a time of 49.56 seconds. In the evening final, he achieved a sixth-place finish with a personal best time of 49.45 seconds.

==== 2022 Winter Junior National Championships ====
Later in December, at the 2022 Winter Junior US National Championships, Winkler finished in a personal best time of 19.70 seconds in the 50-yard freestyle to place fourth at the East edition of the meet. The following day, he placed second in the 200-yard freestyle with a personal best time of 1:33.36. In the morning preliminaries on the fourth and final day, he swam a personal best time and new boys 15–16 National Age Group record of 42.21 seconds in the 100-yard freestyle to qualify for the final ranking first, his time broke the record he set in the event less than one month earlier at 42.52 seconds. He won the event in the evening with a time of 42.22, which was one-hundredth of a second slower than his time in the morning.

=== 2023 ===
At the second stop of the 2023 TYR Pro Swim Series in March in Fort Lauderdale, Florida, Winkler started competition on the second day with a national age group record for the boys 15–16 age group in the 100-meter freestyle, finishing in a time of 48.81 seconds in the preliminaries and qualifying for the final ranking third. In the evening he finished in 49.11 seconds to place fourth, 0.83 seconds behind gold medalist Dylan Carter. The following day, he placed second in the b-final of the 200-meter freestyle with a personal best time of 1:49.02. The fourth and final day, he placed sixth in the final of the 100-meter butterfly with a personal best time of 52.64 seconds. For his final event, he won the b-final of the 50-meter freestyle in a personal best time of 22.49 seconds, finishing two-hundredths of a second ahead of the second-quickest b-final finisher Diogo Ribeiro of Portugal. Fifteen days later, he lowered his personal best time and national age group record in the 100-yard freestyle for the boys 15–16 age group to a time of 41.96 seconds at the 2023 Florida Gold Coast Swimming Championships.

=== North Carolina State University ===
Kaii enrolled at North Carolina State University, beginning in the Fall of 2024, where he was managed by Head Coach Braden Holloway. In his Senior High School year, he was ranked as the top male swim recruit from Florida and was rated fifteenth in the nation.

== 2024 Paris Olympics ==
At the U.S. Olympic trials, he placed eighth in the 100 butterfly, 25th in the 100 freestyle, and 46th in the 200 freestyle. Winkler finished 28th overall in the 100-meter butterfly during the 2024 Paris Olympic Games with a time of 52.64.

== International championships ==
Meet	50 freestyle	100 freestyle	200 freestyle	100 butterfly	4×100 freestyle	4×200 freestyle	4×100 medley
PACJ 2022 (age: 16)	(silver) (22.50)	2nd (b) (50.12)	4th (b) (1:50.81)	1st (b) (53.94)	(gold) (3:15.79 WJ, CR)	exb^{[a]} (7:22.66)	(gold) (3:36.65 CR)

^{a} Winkler swam only in exhibition.

== Personal best times ==
=== Long course meters (50 m pool) ===
Event	Time		Meet	Location	Date	Notes	Ref
50 m freestyle	22.49	b	2023 TYR Pro Swim Series - Fort Lauderdale	Fort Lauderdale, Florida	March 4, 2023		
100 m freestyle	48.81	h	2023 TYR Pro Swim Series - Fort Lauderdale	Fort Lauderdale, Florida	March 2, 2023	NAG	
200 m freestyle	1:49.02	b	2023 TYR Pro Swim Series - Fort Lauderdale	Fort Lauderdale, Florida	March 3, 2023		
100 m butterfly	52.64		2023 TYR Pro Swim Series - Fort Lauderdale	Fort Lauderdale, Florida	March 4, 2023		

Legend: NAG – USA Swimming National Age Group record (boys 15–16);
Records not set in finals: h – heat; sf – semifinal; r – relay 1st leg; rh – relay heat 1st leg; b – B final; † – en route to final mark; so – swim-off; tt – time trial

=== Short course yards (25 yd pool) ===
Event	Time	Meet	Location	Date	Notes	Ref
50 yd freestyle	19.44	2022 Florida Gold Coast Swimming Championships	Pembroke Pines, Florida	March 18, 2023		
100 yd freestyle	41.96	2023 Florida Gold Coast Swimming Championships	Pembroke Pines, Florida	March 19, 2023	NAG	
200 yd freestyle	1:32.68	2023 FHSAA State 1A championship	Ocala, Florida	November 4, 2023		

Legend: NAG – USA Swimming National Age Group record (boys 15–16);
Records not set in finals: h – heat; sf – semifinal; r – relay 1st leg; rh – relay heat 1st leg; b – B final; † – en route to final mark; so – swim-off; tt – time trial

== World records ==
=== World junior records ===
==== Long course meters (50 m pool) ====
No.	Event	Time	Meet	Location	Date	Status	Ref
1	4×100 m freestyle	3:15.79	2022 Junior Pan Pacific Swimming Championships	Honolulu, Hawaii	August 26, 2022	Current	

== National age group records ==
=== Long course meters (50 m pool) ===
No.	Event	Time		Meet	Location	Date	Age	Age Group	Ref
1	100 m freestyle	48.81	h	2023 TYR Pro Swim Series - Fort Lauderdale	Fort Lauderdale, Florida	March 2, 2023	16	15–16	

Legend: h – preliminary heat

=== Short course yards (25 yd pool) ===
No.	Event	Time		Meet	Location	Date	Age	Age Group	Ref
1	100 yd freestyle	42.52		2022 Florida 1A High School State Championships	Stuart, Florida	November 18, 2022	16	15–16	
2	100 yd freestyle (2)	42.21	h	2022 Winter Junior US National Championships	Greensboro, North Carolina	December 10, 2022	16	15–16	
3	100 yd freestyle (3)	41.96		2022 Florida Gold Coast Swimming Championships	Pembroke Pines, Florida	March 19, 2023	16	15–16	

Legend: h – preliminary heat

== Awards and honors ==
- Florida Dairy Farmers, Mr. Swimming Award: 2022
- Miami Herald, Broward County Swimmer of the Year (boys): 2021–2022, 2022–2023
- Sun-Sentinel, Broward County Swimmer of the Year (boys): 2022
- Sun-Sentinel, Broward County Boys First Swimming Team: 2021
