= Maximus Williamson =

American swimmer

Personal information
- National team: United States
- Born: September 4, 2006 (age 19) United States
- Height: 6 ft 7 in (201 cm)

Sport
- Sport: Swimming
- Strokes: Individual medley, freestyle, backstroke
- Club: Lakeside Aquatic Club; North Texas Nadadores (former)
Medal record
Men's swimming
Representing United States
Event	1st	2nd	3rd
World Junior Championships	6	1	0
Junior Pan Pac Championships	1	3	0
Total	7	4	0
World Junior Championships
Gold medal – first place	2023 Netanya	100 m freestyle
Gold medal – first place	2023 Netanya	200 m medley
Gold medal – first place	2023 Netanya	4×100 m freestyle
Gold medal – first place	2023 Netanya	4×200 m freestyle
Gold medal – first place	2023 Netanya	4×100 m medley
Gold medal – first place	2023 Netanya	4×100 m mixed medley
Silver medal – second place	2023 Netanya	4×100 m mixed freestyle
Junior Pan Pac Championships
Gold medal – first place	2022 Honolulu	200 m medley
Silver medal – second place	2022 Honolulu	200 m freestyle
Silver medal – second place	2022 Honolulu	400 m medley
Silver medal – second place	2022 Honolulu	4×200 m freestyle

Maximus Williamson (born September 4, 2006) is an American competitive swimmer and six time World Aquatics Junior swimming champion. He is a 100 m freestyle and 200 m individual medley champion in 2023 World Junior Championships, as well as in the 4 × 100 m freestyle, 4 × 200 m freestyle, 4 × 100 m medley and 4 × 100 m mixed medley, and silver medalist in 4 × 100 m mixed freestyle. In 2022 Junior Pan Pacific Championships he was a gold medalist in the 200 meter individual medley and silver medalist in the 200 meter freestyle, 400-meter individual medley, and 4×200 meter freestyle relay. In 2022, he became the fastest male American swimmer in history in the 15-16 age group in the long course 200 meter individual medley with a time of 1:59.01.

== Background ==
Williamson was born in 2006. He attended Southlake Carroll in Southlake, Texas for his freshman year of high school, where he competed as part of the school swim team. After his freshman year, he transferred to Keller High School in Keller, Texas, starting his sophomore year the following school year, including competing for the school swim team, in the autumn of 2022. He trained and competed with the North Texas Nadadores swim club, based in Southlake, through 2022. Partway through 2022, he started training with Lakeside Aquatic Club, based in Lewisville, Texas, competing for the team at the 2022 Winter Junior US National Championships in December.

== Career ==
=== 2021 ===
On July 23, at the 2021 Texas Age Group Swimming Championships in Arlington, Texas, 14-year-old Williamson swam a 1:53.26 in the 200 meter freestyle and set a new National Age Group record for the boys 13-14 age group, meaning he became the fastest male American performer in the event in history in the specified age range. Later in the year, as a 15-year-old at the 2021 Speedo Winter Junior National Championships in December in Austin, Texas, he won the 200 yard individual medley with a personal best time of 1:43.16. The following day of competition, he finished in a personal best time of 3:42.22 in the 400 yard individual medley to win the event and rank as the second-fastest male American swimmer in history in the 15-16 age group by 0.14 seconds.

=== 2022 ===
As a 15-year-old freshman competing for Southlake Carroll at his first Texas High School 6A State Championships, held at Lee and Joe Jamail Texas Swimming Center in Austin, Texas in February 2022, Williamson won individual titles in the 200 yard individual medley, with a new meet and state record of 1:43.70, and the 100 yard backstroke, with a 48.26, as well as relay titles in the 4×50 yard freestyle relay, where he split a 19.87 for the lead-off leg of the relay, and the 4×100 yard freestyle, on which he set a new meet and state record on the lead-off leg of the relay with a personal best time of 42.98 seconds. The following month, he won five individual titles at the 2022 Speedo Sectional Championship Series in College Station, Texas, including the 200 yard backstroke with a personal best time of 1:42.92, the 500 yard freestyle with a meet record and personal best time of 4:19.82, the 200 yard freestyle with a meet record and personal best time of 1:34.97, the 100 yard backstroke with a personal best time of 47.14 seconds, and the 50 yard freestyle with a personal best time of 19.84 seconds.

==== 2022 US International Team Trials ====
In April, at the 2022 USA Swimming International Team Trials in Greensboro, North Carolina, Williamson placed eighth in the C-final of the 200 meter freestyle on the second day of competition with a 1:54.94. Later the same day, he won the B-final of the 200 meter backstroke with a personal best time of 1:58.75. The following day, he swam a 4:20.01 in the B-final of the 400 meter individual medley and placed second. On the fourth day, in the C-final of the 100 meter backstroke, he finished in a time of 56.57 seconds to placed sixth. Day five of five, he won the B-final of the 200 meter individual medley, finishing in a personal best time of 2:01.45, which ranked as the fastest time in the event by a 15-year-old male American swimmer. Over the five-day program, he also placed thirty-third in the 100 meter freestyle on day one with a time of 50.69 seconds and thirty-eighth in the 50 meter freestyle on day five with a 23.67.

Based on his performances, Williamson was named to the USA Swimming roster for the 2022 Junior Pan Pacific Swimming Championships in the 200-meter individual medley and 400 meter individual medley.

==== 2022 Junior Pan Pacific Championships ====
2022 Junior Pan Pac Championships
Gold medal – first place	200 m individual medley	1:59.01 (CR, NAG)
Silver medal – second place	200 m freestyle	1:48.21
Silver medal – second place	400 m individual medley	4:17.58
Silver medal – second place	4×200 m freestyle	7:15.18

The first day of competition at the 2022 Junior Pan Pacific Swimming Championships, conducted in August in Honolulu, Hawaii at Veterans Memorial Aquatic Center, Williamson started off with a tenth-place finish in the preliminary heats of the 100 meter backstroke with a personal best time of 55.83 seconds, before withdrawing from further competition in the event. Later in the day, in the final of the 200 meter freestyle, he won a silver medal with a personal best time of 1:48.21, finishing 1.10 seconds behind gold medalist Flynn Southam of Australia and 0.05 seconds ahead of bronze medalist Adam Wu of Canada. In his first final on day two, the 400 meter individual medley, he won the silver medal with a personal best time of 4:17.58, which was 2.35 seconds slower than gold medalist Ei Kamikawabata of Japan. For his second event, the 4×200 meter freestyle relay, he split a 1:49.68 for the fourth leg of the relay to help win the silver medal with a final time of 7:15.18.

On the evening of day three and morning of day four, Williamson won the B-final of the 200 meter backstroke with a 1:59.95 and placed twenty-first in the 50 meter freestyle with a 23.65, respectively. For his final event, the 200 meter individual medley, he won the gold medal with a Championships record and personal best time of 1:59.01, which lowered the mark 0.50 seconds from the 1:59.51 it was set at in 2012 by Chase Kalisz. His time also set a new National Age Group record (NAG) for the boys 15-16 age group in the event, registering as 0.44 seconds faster than the former record of 1:59.45 established in 2018 by Carson Foster.

==== 2022 Winter Junior National Championships ====
In December 2022, at the 2022 Winter Junior US National Championships conducted in short course yards in Austin, Texas, Williamson swam a personal best time of 1:33.07 for the first leg of the 4×200 yard freestyle relay on day one, setting a new National Age Group record for the boys 15-16 age group in the 200 yard freestyle and lowering the former record set by Drew Kibler in 2017 by 0.23 seconds. The following evening, he swam a personal best time of 1:42.07 to place second overall in the 200 yard individual medley. Later in the same session, he achieved a personal best time of 19.82 seconds in the final of the 50 yard freestyle. He won three events for his locality, the West edition, the next day, including the 400 yard individual medley with a boys 15-16 National Age Group record of 3:39.83 that was over two full seconds faster than the former record set approximately 20 years earlier, the 200-yard freestyle with a 1:33.60, and the 100 yard backstroke with a personal best time of 46.90 seconds.

For the fourth and meet-concluding finals session, Williamson won the 200 yard backstroke with a personal best time of 1:40.88, which was a 2.04 second drop from his previous personal best time of 1:42.92 and registered as a new boys 15-16 National Age Group record, improving on the former record of 1:40.90 by Ryan Murphy by 0.02 seconds. He subsequently won the 100 yard freestyle with personal best time of 42.61 seconds before going on to swim another personal best time of 42.49 for 100 yard lead-off leg of the 4×100 yard freestyle relay.

=== 2023 ===
For his second Texas High School 6A State Championships, held in February 2023, Williamson competed for Keller High School and won individual titles in the 100 yard backstroke and 200 yard individual medley with times of 47.24 seconds and 1:42.17, respectively.

== International championships ==
Meet	50 freestyle	200 freestyle	100 backstroke	200 backstroke	200 medley	400 medley	4×200 freestyle
PACJ 2022 (age: 15)	21st (23.65)	(silver) (1:48.21)	10th (h, WD) (55.83)	1st (b) (1:59.95)	(gold) (1:59.01 CR)	(silver) (4:17.58)	(silver) (split 1:49.68, 4th leg)

== Personal best times ==
=== Long course meters (50 m pool) ===
Event	Time		Meet	Location	Date	Age	Notes	Ref
100 m freestyle	50.13	h	2023 TYR Pro Swim Series - Mission Viejo	Mission Viejo, California	May 18, 2023	16		
200 m freestyle	1:48.21		2022 Junior Pan Pacific Championships	Honolulu, Hawaii	August 24, 2022	15		
100 m backstroke	55.83	h	2022 Junior Pan Pacific Championships	Honolulu, Hawaii	August 24, 2022	15		
200 m backstroke	1:58.75	b	2022 USA Swimming International Team Trials	Greensboro, North Carolina	April 27, 2022	15		
200 m individual medley	1:59.01		2022 Junior Pan Pacific Championships	Honolulu, Hawaii	August 27, 2022	15	NAG	
400 m individual medley	4:17.58		2022 Junior Pan Pacific Championships	Honolulu, Hawaii	August 25, 2022	15		

Legend: NAG – USA Swimming National Age Group record (boys 15-16);
Records not set in finals: h – heat; sf – semifinal; r – relay 1st leg; rh – relay heat 1st leg; b – B final; † – en route to final mark; so – swim-off; tt – time trial

=== Short course yards (25 yd pool) ===
Event	Time		Meet	Location	Date	Age	Notes	Ref
50 yd freestyle	19.65		2023 Speedo Southern Premier	Nashville, Tennessee	March 4, 2023	16		
100 yd freestyle	42.49	r	2022 Winter Junior US National Championships	Austin, Texas	December 10, 2022	16		
200 yd freestyle	1:33.07	r	2022 Winter Junior US National Championships	Austin, Texas	December 7, 2022	16	NAG	
500 yd freestyle	4:16.84		2023 Speedo Southern Premier	Nashville, Tennessee	March 4, 2023	16		
100 yd backstroke	46.29		2024 6A Texas High School State Championship	Austin, Texas	December 8, 2022	16		
200 yd backstroke	1:40.88		2022 Winter Junior US National Championships	Austin, Texas	December 9, 2022	16	NAG	
200 yd individual medley	1:40.81		2024 6A Texas High School State Championships	Austin, Texas	February 24, 2024	17		
400 yd individual medley	3:39.83		2022 Winter Junior US National Championships	Austin, Texas	December 9, 2022	16	NAG	

Legend: NAG – USA Swimming National Age Group record (boys 15-16);
Records not set in finals: h – heat; sf – semifinal; r – relay 1st leg; rh – relay heat 1st leg; b – B final; † – en route to final mark; so – swim-off; tt – time trial

== National age group records ==
=== Long course meters (50 m pool) ===
No.	Event	Time	Meet	Location	Date	Age	Age Group	Ref
1	200 m freestyle	1:53.26	2021 Texas Age Group Championships	Arlington, Texas	July 23, 2021	14	13–14	
2	200 m individual medley	1:59.01	2022 Junior Pan Pacific Championships	Honolulu, Hawaii	August 27, 2022	15	15–16	

=== Short course yards (25 yd pool) ===
No.	Event	Time		Meet	Location	Date	Age	Age Group	Ref
1	200 yd freestyle	1:33.07	r	2022 Winter Junior US National Championships	Austin, Texas	December 7, 2022	16	15–16	
2	400 yd individual medley	3:39.83		2022 Winter Junior US National Championships	Austin, Texas	December 9, 2022	16	15–16	
3	200 yd backstroke	1:40.88		2022 Winter Junior US National Championships	Austin, Texas	December 10, 2022	16	15–16	

Legend: r – relay 1st leg

== Awards and honors ==
- Swimming World, Performance of the Week: December 10, 2021
- Arena, Swim of the Week: May 6, 2022
- Swimming World, Up & Comers: January 2022
