= 2021 U.S. Open Swimming Championships =

Swimming competition in the United States

2021 Toyota U.S. Open Championships
- Host city: Greensboro, North Carolina, United States
- Date: December 1–4
- Venue: Greensboro Aquatic Center
- Events: 28

The 2021 Toyota U.S Open Swimming Championships was held from December 1 to 4, 2021 at Greensboro Aquatic Center in Greensboro, North Carolina, United States. Competition was conducted in a long course (50-meter) pool.

== Results ==
=== Men ===
| Event | Gold | | Silver | | Bronze | |
|---|---|---|---|---|---|---|
| 50 m freestyle | Bruno Fratus | 22.36 | Adam Chaney | 22.37 | Andrej Barna | 22.43 |
| 100 m freestyle | Andrej Barna | 48.44 | Gus Borges | 49.40 | Tate Jackson | 49.52 |
| 200 m freestyle | Trey Freeman | 1:47.90 | Khiew Hoe Yean | 1:49.00 | Oskar Lindholm | 1:50.63 |
| 400 m freestyle | Trey Freeman | 3:49.06 | Khiew Hoe Yean | 3:50.52 | Bobby Finke | 3:51.44 |
| 800 m freestyle | Bobby Finke | 7:54.07 | Charlie Clark | 7:54.40 | Tommy-Lee Camblong | 8:01.33 |
| 1500 m freestyle | Bobby Finke | 15:04.77 | Charlie Clark | 15:07.53 | Trey Freeman | 15:24.83 |
| 100 m backstroke | Evangelos Makrygiannis | 54.06 | Sam Stewart | 54.70 | Adam Chaney | 55.43 |
| 200 m backstroke | Evangelos Makrygiannis | 2:00.48 | Baylor Nelson | 2:00.85 | Richie Stokes | 2:01.24 |
| 100 m breaststroke | Reid Mikuta | 1:01.35 | Noah Nichols | 1:01.41 | Brandon Fischer | 1:02.26 |
| 200 m breaststroke | Brandon Fischer | 2:13.21 | Raphael Rached Windmuller | 2:15.92 | Marcus Mok | 2:16.80 |
| 100 m butterfly | Eric Friese | 52.56 | Thomas Heilman | 53.27 | Iago Moussalem Amaral | 53.59 |
| 200 m butterfly | Kim Minseop | 1:59.30 | Hwangbo Junheon | 1:59.33 | Thomas Heilman | 1:59.87 |
| 200 m individual medley | Baylor Nelson | 1:59.86 | Collyn Gagne | 2:02.59 | Joaquin Gonzalez Piñero | 2:04.49 |
| 400 m individual medley | Bobby Finke | 4:17.39 | Baylor Nelson | 4:17.61 | Collyn Gagne | 4:19.43 |

=== Women ===
| Event | Gold | | Silver | | Bronze | |
|---|---|---|---|---|---|---|
| 50 m freestyle | Mallory Comerford | 25.24 | Arina Openysheva | 25.33 | Camille Spink | 25.36 |
| 100 m freestyle | Mallory Comerford | 54.74 | Arina Openysheva | 55.23 | Camille Spink | 55.44 |
| 200 m freestyle | Katie Ledecky | 1:55.47; CR | Erin Gemmell | 1:58.61 | Julia Mrozinski | 1:59.85 |
| 400 m freestyle | Katie Ledecky | 4:00.51; CR | Erin Gemmell | 4:10.12 | Sierra Schmidt | 4:12.53 |
| 800 m freestyle | Katie Ledecky | 8:12.81; CR | Leah Smith | 8:23.78 | Sierra Schmidt | 8:34.80 |
| 1500 m freestyle | Katie Ledecky | 15:45.32 | Sierra Schmidt | 16:21.56 | Elise Bauer | 16:32.55 |
| 100 m backstroke | Regan Smith | 58.69 | Kobie Melton | 1:01.91 | Anya Mostek | 1:01.93 |
| 200 m backstroke | Regan Smith | 2:07.09; CR | Leah Smith | 2:11.26 | Julia Podkościelny | 2:12.42 |
| 100 m breaststroke | Hannah Bach | 1:09.01 | Phee Jinq En Tylor Mathieu | 1:10.28 | none awarded | |
| 200 m breaststroke | Kim Ahryoung | 2:29.86 | Abby Hay | 2:30.51 | Tylor Mathieu | 2:32.73 |
| 100 m butterfly | Mabel Zavaros | 1:00.05 | Autumn D'Arcy | 1:00.24 | Sydney Lu | 1:00.39 |
| 200 m butterfly | Regan Smith | 2:10.58 | Leah Gingrich | 2:11.02 | Amanda Ray | 2:11.51 |
| 200 m individual medley | Leah Smith | 2:11.67 | Summer Smith | 2:15.02 | Abby Hay | 2:15.45 |
| 400 m individual medley | Leah Smith | 4:38.89 | Julia Podkościelny | 4:43.57 | Ella Jansen | 4:44.11 |

== Championships records set ==
| Day | Event | Stage | Time | Name | Country | Date | Ref |
|---|---|---|---|---|---|---|---|
| 1 | 800 m freestyle (Women's) | Final | 8:12.81 | Katie Ledecky | United States | December 1, 2021 | |
| 2 | 400 m freestyle (Women's) | Final | 4:00.51 | Katie Ledecky | United States | December 2, 2021 | |
| 3 | 200 m freestyle (Women's) | Heats | 1:56.06 | Katie Ledecky | United States | December 3, 2021 | |
| 3 | 200 m freestyle (Women's) | Final | 1:55.47 | Katie Ledecky | United States | December 3, 2021 | |
| 4 | 200 m backstroke (Women's) | Final | 2:07.09 | Regan Smith | United States | December 4, 2021 | |
