= Airi Mitsui =

Japanese swimmer (born 2004)

Personal information
- National team: Japan
- Born: 12 June 2004 (age 22) Japan

Sport
- Sport: Swimming
- Strokes: Butterfly, individual medley, freestyle
Medal record
Women's swimming
Representing Japan
Event	1st	2nd	3rd
Junior Pan Pac Championships	1	2	0
Total	1	2	0
Junior Pan Pac Championships
Gold medal – first place	2022 Honolulu	200 m butterfly
Silver medal – second place	2022 Honolulu	100 m butterfly
Silver medal – second place	2022 Honolulu	4×100 m medley

Airi Mitsui (三井 愛梨, Mitsui Airi; born 12 June 2004) is a Japanese competitive swimmer. At the 2022 Junior Pan Pacific Championships, she won the gold medal in the 200 metre butterfly and silver medals in the 100 metre butterfly and 4×100 metre medley relay. At the 2022 World Short Course Championships, she placed sixth in the final of the 200 metre butterfly.

== Career ==
=== 2022 Junior Pan Pacific Championships ===
2022 Junior Pan Pac Championships
Gold medal – first place	200 m butterfly	2:07.82 (CR)
Silver medal – second place	100 m butterfly	58.67
Silver medal – second place	4×100 m medley	4:04.01

On the first day of competition at the 2022 Junior Pan Pacific Swimming Championships, held in August at the Veterans Memorial Aquatic Center in Honolulu, United States, Mitsui won the gold medal in the 200 metre butterfly with a Championships record and personal best time of 2:07.82, which lowered the mark 0.66 seconds from the 2:08.48 set by Cassidy Bayer of the United States six years earlier. The following day, she placed thirty-second in the 100 metre freestyle preliminaries with a personal best time of 57.79 seconds and did not advance to the evening finals. Day three of four, she won her second medal, this time finishing in a personal best time of 58.67 seconds in the final of the 100 metre butterfly to win the silver medal 0.09 seconds behind gold medalist Alex Shackell of the United States. The fourth and final day, she started the evening finals session with a third-place finish in the b-final of the 200 metre individual medley with a personal best time of 2:15.94 before winning a silver medal as part of the 4×100 metre medley relay, where she split a 58.76 for the butterfly leg of the relay to contribute to the final time of 4:04.01. When points for individual competitors were summed at the end of competition per the points they earned for their place-finishings in events, Mitsui ranked as the tenth-overall highest-scoring female competitor.

=== 2022 World Short Course Championships ===
Leading up to the 2022 World Short Course Championships, Mitsui competed at the 2022 Japan Short Course Championships in October in Tokyo, winning the gold medal in the 200 metre butterfly with a personal best time of 2:04.35 and placing seventh in the 100 metre butterfly with a personal best time of 57.85 seconds. As an 18-year-old at the 2022 World Short Course Championships, conducted at Melbourne Sports and Aquatic Centre in Melbourne, Australia in December, she ranked fifth in the preliminaries of the 200 metre butterfly on day three with a time of 2:05.27 and qualified for the evening final. In the evening final, she placed sixth with a time of 2:05.40, finishing after a gold-silver sweep by two American swimmers and 5.79 seconds behind the world record of 1:59.61 set by Mireia Belmonte of Spain in 2014.

=== 2023 ===
In the preliminaries of the 100 metre butterfly on day one at the 2023 Japan Swim in April in Tokyo, Mitsui ranked sixth with a time of 58.96 seconds. She lowered her time to a 58.87 in the final and placed seventh. With a time of 2:09.33 in the morning preliminaries of the 200 metre butterfly on the third morning, she qualified for the final ranking first. She achieved a personal best and 2023 World Aquatics Championships and 2022 Asian Games qualifying time of 2:06.77 in the final, winning the gold medal by 0.68 seconds and lowering her previous personal best time by 1.05 seconds. In May, at the first stop of the 2023 Mare Nostrum tour, in Canet-en-Roussillon, France, she won the gold medal in the 200 metre butterfly with a time of 2:09.13.

== International championships (50 m) ==
Meet	100 freestyle	100 butterfly	200 butterfly	200 individual medley	4×100 medley
PACJ 2022 (age: 18)	32nd (57.79)	(silver) (58.67)	(gold) (2:07.82 CR)	3rd (b) (2:15.94)	(silver) (split 58.76, fl leg)

== International championships (25 m) ==
Meet	200 butterfly
WC 2022 (age: 18)	6th (2:05.40)

== Personal best times ==
=== Long course meters (50 m pool) ===
Event	Time		Meet	Location	Date	Age	Ref
100 m butterfly	58.67		2022 Junior Pan Pacific Championships	Honolulu, United States	26 August 2022	18	
200 m butterfly	2:06.77		2023 Japan Swim	Tokyo	6 April 2023	18	
200 m individual medley	2:15.94	b	2022 Junior Pan Pacific Championships	Honolulu, United States	27 August 2022	18	

Legend: b – b-final

=== Short course meters (25 m pool) ===
Event	Time	Meet	Location	Date	Age	Ref
100 m butterfly	57.85	2022 Japan Short Course Championships	Tokyo	23 October 2022	18	
200 m butterfly	2:04.35	2022 Japan Short Course Championships	Tokyo	22 October 2022	18	
