= 2022 Junior Pan Pacific Swimming Championships =

International swimming competition

- Host city: Honolulu, Hawaii, United States
- Date: 24–27 August
- Venue: Veterans Memorial Aquatic Center
- Nations: 10
- Athletes: 227
- Events: 35

The 2022 Junior Pan Pacific Swimming Championships were held from 24 to 27 August 2022 at Veterans Memorial Aquatic Center in Honolulu, Hawaii, United States. Competition was conducted in a long course (50 m) pool. Swimmers between the ages of 13 and 18 competed. Each country was allowed to enter more than two swimmers per event, however only the two fastest swimmers per country in the preliminary heats of each event were eligible for medals. Events were contested in a heats and finals format.

A Parade of Nations for all competing countries, Australia, Canada, Cook Islands, Federated States of Micronesia, Fiji, Japan, New Zealand, Samoa, Singapore, and the United States, started off the evening session on day one of competition preceding the first final of the evening and included one flag bearer from each country circling the pool deck with the flag of their respective country before a welcome message and a traditional Hawaiian blessing of the pool.

For the first time at a single Junior Pan Pacific Swimming Championships, Australia won the gold medals in all men's individual freestyle events.

== Results ==
=== Men ===
Event	Gold		Silver		Bronze	
50 m freestyle	Flynn Southam; Australia	22.36	Diggory Dillingham; United States Kaii Winkler; United States	22.50	Not awarded	
100 m freestyle	Flynn Southam; Australia	48.23; CR	Thomas Heilman; United States	49.34	Jaime Mooney; Australia	50.19
200 m freestyle	Flynn Southam; Australia	1:47.11; CR	Maximus Williamson; United States	1:48.21	Adam Wu; Canada	1:48.26
400 m freestyle	Joshua Staples; Australia	3:48.36; CR	Rex Maurer; United States	3:49.86	Alec Enyeart; United States	3:51.07
800 m freestyle	Joshua Staples; Australia	7:56.29	Hiroyoshi Miyaki; Japan	7:57.64	Alec Enyeart; United States	8:02.92
1500 m freestyle	Joshua Staples; Australia	15:18.54	Josh Parent; United States Alec Enyeart; United States	15:27.36	Not awarded	
100 m backstroke	Daniel Diehl; United States	53.27; CR	Josh Zuchowski; United States	54.51	Hidekazu Takehara; Japan	55.51
200 m backstroke	Hidekazu Takehara; Japan	1:57.00; CR	Josh Zuchowski; United States	1:58.16	Keaton Jones; United States	1:58.98
100 m breaststroke	Zhier Fan; United States	1:00.74	Yamato Okadome; Japan	1:01.35	Nicholas Mahabir; Singapore	1:01.78
200 m breaststroke	Asahi Kawashima; Japan	2:11.81	Yamato Okadome; Japan	2:12.19	Nicholas Mahabir; Singapore	2:12.50
100 m butterfly	Thomas Heilman; United States	51.98; CR	Jesse Coleman; Australia	52.23	Tomoyuki Matsushita; Japan	53.38
200 m butterfly	Aaron Shackell; United States	1:55.81; CR	Thomas Heilman; United States	1:56.52	Ei Kamikawabata; Japan	1:58.32
200 m individual medley	Maximus Williamson; United States	1:59.01; CR	Tomoyuki Matsushita; Japan	2:00.64	William Petric; Australia	2:00.82
400 m individual medley	Ei Kamikawabata; Japan	4:15.23	Maximus Williamson; United States	4:17.58	Riki Abe; Japan	4:17.96
4×100 m freestyle relay	United States; Thomas Heilman (49.14); Henry McFadden (49.04); Daniel Diehl (48.66); Kaii Winkler (48.95)	3:15.79; WJ, CR	Australia; Flynn Southam (48.43); Marcus Da Silva (50.20); Anders McAlpine (49.80); Jaime Mooney (49.63)	3:18.06	Japan; Tatsumi Scott (50.42); Yoshitoku Narushima (50.01); Yamato Okadome (49.60); Ryosuke Hasunuma (49.91)	3:19.94
4×200 m freestyle relay	Australia; Flynn Southam (1:47.30); Anders McAlpine (1:48.63); Marcus Da Silva (1:49.30); Joshua Staples (1:47.84)	7:13.07; CR	United States; Henry McFadden (1:49.49); Thomas Heilman (1:47.98); Rex Maurer (1:48.03); Maximus Williamson (1:49.68)	7:15.18	Japan; Maki Kiriyama (1:50.69); Yuta Watanabe (1:49.27); Tatsumi Scott (1:51.06); Tomoyuki Matsushita (1:51.24)	7:22.26
4×100 m medley relay	United States; Daniel Diehl (54.24); Zhier Fan (1:01.52); Thomas Heilman (51.71); Kaii Winkler (49.18)	3:36.65; CR	Australia; Fergus McLachlan (55.81); Haig Buckingham (1:00.80); Jesse Coleman (52.48); Flynn Southam (47.87)	3:36.96	Japan; Hidekazu Takehara (55.67); Yamato Okadome (1:01.31); Tomoyuki Matsushita (53.23); Yuta Watanabe (50.14)	3:40.35

=== Women ===
Event	Gold		Silver		Bronze	
50 m freestyle	Milla Jansen; Australia	25.19	Anna Moesch; United States	25.32	Erin Gemmell; United States	25.46
100 m freestyle	Erin Gemmell; United States	54.13; CR	Milla Jansen; Australia	54.36	Olivia Wunsch; Australia	54.50
200 m freestyle	Erin Gemmell; United States	1:56.15; CR	Jamie Perkins; Australia	1:57.34	Kayla Wilson; United States	1:58.42
400 m freestyle	Erin Gemmell; United States	4:05.07; CR	Jamie Perkins; Australia	4:06.64	Jillian Cox; United States	4:06.84
800 m freestyle	Jillian Cox; United States	8:30.38	Jamie Perkins; Australia	8:30.44	Michaela Mattes; United States	8:35.78
1500 m freestyle	Michaela Mattes; United States	16:24.02	Ruka Takezawa; Japan	16:25.19	Tiana Kritzinger; Australia	16:26.63
100 m backstroke	Maggie Wanezek; United States	59.96	Iona Anderson; Australia	1:00.39	Kennedy Noble; United States	1:01.03
200 m backstroke	Yuzuki Mizuno; Japan	2:09.17	Mio Narita; Japan	2:09.67	Kennedy Noble; United States	2:11.32
100 m breaststroke	Piper Enge; United States	1:08.58	Kotomi Kato; Japan	1:09.10	Isabella Johnson; Australia	1:09.36
200 m breaststroke	Kotomi Kato; Japan	2:26.55	Yuri Matsumoto; Japan	2:27.46	Piper Enge; United States	2:27.93
100 m butterfly	Alex Shackell; United States	58.58	Airi Mitsui; Japan	58.67	Bailey Hartman; United States	58.71
200 m butterfly	Airi Mitsui; Japan	2:07.82; CR	Yasuki Fujimoto; Japan	2:09.63	Alex Shackell; United States	2:09.71
200 m individual medley	Mio Narita; Japan	2:11.22	Ashley McMillan; Canada	2:13.31	Gracie Weyant; United States	2:14.36
400 m individual medley	Mio Narita; Japan	4:36.79; CR	Kayla Han; United States	4:43.60	Ayami Suzuki; Japan	4:43.70
4×100 m freestyle relay	United States; Kayla Wilson (54.78); Anna Moesch (54.44); Erin Gemmell (54.29); Alex Shackell (54.48)	3:37.99; CR	Australia; Olivia Wunsch (54.68); Hannah Casey (55.39); Jamie Perkins (55.01); Milla Jansen (53.96)	3:39.04	Canada; Lilly Daley (55.71); Ella Jansen (55.59); Kamryn Cannings (54.87); Christey Liang (54.73)	3:40.90
4×200 m freestyle relay	United States; Kayla Wilson (2:00.01); Jillian Cox (1:59.32); Cavan Gormsen (2:00.51); Erin Gemmell (1:54.86)	7:54.70; CR	Australia; Jamie Perkins (1:57.64); Amelia Weber (1:59.11); Olivia Wunsch (1:59.91); Milla Jansen (1:59.19)	7:55.85	Japan; Hinata Umeki (1:59.92); Misa Okuzono (2:00.91); Karin Ninomiya (2:01.19); Ruka Takezawa (1:59.36)	8:01.38
4×100 m medley relay	United States; Maggie Wanezek (1:00.66); Piper Enge (1:09.30); Alex Shackell (58.45); Erin Gemmell (53.73)	4:02.14; CR	Japan; Yuzuki Mizuno (1:01.14); Kotomi Kato (1:08.72); Airi Mitsui (58.76); Karin Ninomiya (55.39)	4:04.01	Australia; Iona Anderson (1:00.98); Isabella Johnson (1:10.42); Bella Grant (1:00.50); Milla Jansen (53.94)	4:05.84

=== Mixed ===
Event	Gold		Silver		Bronze	
4×100 m medley relay	United States; Daniel Diehl (53.42); Zhier Fan (1:00.76); Alex Shackell (58.55); Anna Moesch (54.10)	3:46.83; CR	Australia; Jaclyn Barclay (59.89); Haig Buckingham (1:02.60); Jesse Coleman (52.67); Hannah Casey (55.35)	3:50.51	Japan; Hidekazu Takehara (56.08); Yamato Okadome (59.99); Hazuki Hasegawa (58.89); Sakuya Ito (55.85)	3:50.81

== Medal table ==
* Host nation (United States)

Rank	Nation	Gold	Silver	Bronze	Total
1	United States*	19	14	13	46
2	Japan	8	11	10	29
3	Australia	8	11	6	25
4	Canada	0	1	2	3
5	Singapore	0	0	2	2
Totals (5 entries)		35	37	33	105

== Championships records pre-competition ==
The following Junior Pan Pacific Swimming Championships records were the established Championships records prior to the start of competition.

=== Men ===
Event	Time	Name	Country	Edition	Location
50 m freestyle	22.20	Paul Powers	United States	2014	Maui, United States
100 m freestyle	48.91	Jack Cartwright	Australia	2016	Maui, United States
200 m freestyle	1:47.65	Drew Kibler	United States	2018	Suva, Fiji
400 m freestyle	3:50.51	Nicholas Caldwell	United States	2010	Maui, United States
800 m freestyle	7:55.16	Bobby Finke	United States	2016	Maui, United States
1500 m freestyle	15:05.29	Bobby Finke	United States	2016	Maui, United States
100 m backstroke	54.07	Jack Conger	United States	2012	Honolulu, United States
200 m backstroke	1:57.20	Jack Conger	United States	2012	Honolulu, United States
100 m breaststroke	59.85	Akihiro Yamaguchi	Japan	2012	Honolulu, United States
200 m breaststroke	2:08.03	Akihiro Yamaguchi	Japan	2012	Honolulu, United States
100 m butterfly	52.37	Daniel Bell	New Zealand	2009	Guam
200 m butterfly	1:55.92	Andrew Seliskar	United States	2014	Maui, United States
200 m individual medley	1:59.51	Chase Kalisz	United States	2012	Honolulu, United States
400 m individual medley	4:12.59	Chase Kalisz	United States	2012	Honolulu, United States
4×100 m freestyle relay	3:17.67	Ryan Hoffer (50.17); Daniel Krueger (49.14); Cameron Craig (49.06); Drew Kibler (49.30)	United States	2016	Maui, United States
4×200 m freestyle relay	7:16.42	Jake Magahey (1:49.40); Drew Kibler (1:48.30); Dare Rose (1:49.04); Carson Foster (1:49.68)	United States	2018	Suva, Fiji
4×100 m medley relay	3:37.67	Takeshi Kawamoto (55.35); Akihiro Yamaguchi (59.55); Daiya Seto (53.21); Kenta Hirai (49.56)	Japan	2012	Honolulu, United States

=== Women ===
Event	Time	Name	Country	Edition	Location
50 m freestyle	24.74	Yolane Kukla	Australia	2010	Maui, United States
100 m freestyle	54.47	Gretchen Walsh	United States	2018	Suva, Fiji
200 m freestyle	1:57.73	Dagny Knutson	United States	2009	Guam
400 m freestyle	4:07.10	Leah Smith	United States	2012	Honolulu, United States
800 m freestyle	8:28.01	Leah Smith	United States	2012	Honolulu, United States
1500 m freestyle	16:08.09	Lani Pallister	Australia	2018	Suva, Fiji
100 m backstroke	59.59	Katharine Berkoff	United States	2018	Suva, Fiji
200 m backstroke	2:08.81	Isabelle Stadden	United States	2018	Suva, Fiji
100 m breaststroke	1:07.55	Emily Weiss	United States	2018	Suva, Fiji
200 m breaststroke	2:25.46	Zoe Bartel	United States	2016	Maui, United States
100 m butterfly	58.38	Maggie Mac Neil	Canada	2018	Suva, Fiji
200 m butterfly	2:08.48	Cassidy Bayer	United States	2016	Maui, United States
200 m individual medley	2:10.79	Dagny Knutson	United States	2009	Guam
400 m individual medley	4:39.76	Becca Mann	United States	2012	Honolulu, United States
4×100 m freestyle relay	3:39.73	Lucy McJannett (55.07); Shayna Jack (54.66); Sophie Taylor (55.67); Chelsea Gillett (54.33)	Australia	2014	Maui, United States
4×200 m freestyle relay	7:57.93	Claire Tuggle (1:59.32); Isabel Ivey (1:59.73); Gretchen Walsh (1:59.72); Lucie Nordmann (1:59.16)	United States	2018	Suva, Fiji
4×100 m medley relay	4:02.33	Phoebe Bacon (1:00.49); Emily Weiss (1:08.52); Lucie Nordmann (58.57); Gretchen Walsh (54.75)	United States	2018	Suva, Fiji

=== Mixed ===
Event	Time	Name	Country	Edition	Location
4×100 m medley	3:47.01	Phoebe Bacon (1:00.44); Daniel Roy (1:00.68); Luca Urlando (52.11); Gretchen Walsh (53.78)	United States	2018	Suva, Fiji

== Championships records set ==
The following Championships records were set during the course of competition.

Day	Date	Event	Stage	Time	Name	Country	Ref
1	24 August	200 m freestyle (women)	Heats	1:56.66	Erin Gemmell	United States	
1	24 August	100 m backstroke (men)	Heats	53.40	Daniel Diehl	United States	
1	24 August	200 m freestyle (women)	Final	1:56.15	Erin Gemmell	United States	
1	24 August	200 m freestyle (men)	Final	1:47.11	Flynn Southam	Australia	
1	24 August	100 m backstroke (men)	Final	53.27	Daniel Diehl	United States	
1	24 August	200 m butterfly (women)	Final	2:07.82	Airi Mitsui	Japan	
1	24 August	200 m butterfly (men)	Final	1:55.81	Aaron Shackell	United States	
1	24 August	4×100 m medley relay (mixed)	Final	3:46.83	Daniel Diehl (53.42); Zhier Fan (1:00.76); Alex Shackell (58.55); Anna Moesch (54.10)	United States	
2	25 August	100 m freestyle (women)	Heats	54.42	Erin Gemmell	United States	
2	25 August	100 m freestyle (women)	Final	54.13	Erin Gemmell	United States	
2	25 August	100 m freestyle (men)	Final	48.23	Flynn Southam	Australia	
2	25 August	400 m individual medley (women)	Final	4:36.79	Mio Narita	Japan	
2	25 August	4×200 m freestyle relay (women)	Final	7:54.70	Kayla Wilson (2:00.01); Jillian Cox (1:59.32); Cavan Gormsen (2:00.51); Erin Gemmell (1:54.86)	United States	
2	25 August	4×200 m freestyle relay (men)	Final	7:13.07	Flynn Southam (1:47.30); Anders McAlpine (1:48.63); Marcus Da Silva (1:49.30); Joshua Staples (1:47.84)	Australia	
3	26 August	400 m freestyle (women)	Final	4:05.07	Erin Gemmell	United States	
3	26 August	400 m freestyle (men)	Final	3:48.36	Joshua Staples	Australia	
3	26 August	100 m butterfly (men)	Final	51.98	Thomas Heilman	United States	
3	26 August	200 m backstroke (men)	Final	1:57.00	Hidekazu Takehara	Japan	
3	26 August	4×100 m freestyle relay (women)	Final	3:37.99	Kayla Wilson (54.78); Anna Moesch (54.44); Erin Gemmell (54.29); Alex Shackell (54.48)	United States	
3	26 August	4×100 m freestyle relay (men)	Final	3:15.79 (WJ)	Thomas Heilman (49.14); Henry McFadden (49.04); Daniel Diehl (48.66); Kaii Winkler (48.95)	United States	
4	27 August	200 m individual medley (men)	Final	1:59.01	Maximus Williamson	United States	
4	27 August	4×100 m medley relay (women)	Final	4:02.14	Maggie Wanezek (1:00.66); Piper Enge (1:09.30); Alex Shackell (58.45); Erin Gemmell (53.73)	United States	
4	27 August	4×100 m medley relay (men)	Final	3:36.65	Daniel Diehl (54.24); Zhier Fan (1:01.52); Thomas Heilman (51.71); Kaii Winkler (49.18)	United States	

== Community impacts ==
Leading up to and during the competition, venue facilities were not accessible to local residents for regular usage.
