= Joshua Staples =

Australian swimmer

Personal information
- National team: Australia
- Born: 2004 (age 21–22) Casuarina, Northern Territory, Australia

Sport
- Sport: Swimming
- Strokes: Freestyle
- Club: St Peters Western
- Coach: Dean Boxall
Medal record
Men's swimming
Representing Australia
Event	1st	2nd	3rd
Junior Pan Pac Championships	4	0	0
Total	4	0	0
Junior Pan Pac Championships
Gold medal – first place	2022 Honolulu	400 m freestyle
Gold medal – first place	2022 Honolulu	800 m freestyle
Gold medal – first place	2022 Honolulu	1500 m freestyle
Gold medal – first place	2022 Honolulu	4×200 m freestyle

Joshua Staples (born 2004) is an Australian competitive swimmer. He is the 2022 Junior Pan Pacific champion in the 400-metre freestyle, 800-metre freestyle, 1500-metre freestyle, and 4×200-metre freestyle relay. In 2022, he was part of a first sweep of all men's individual freestyle events at a single Junior Pan Pacific Swimming Championships by Australian swimmers, winning three of the six gold medals with Flynn Southam winning the other three.

== Background ==
Staples was born in Casuarina, Northern Territory, where he trained under the guidance of Peter Brasher as part of the Casuarina Storm Swimming Club. He currently trains with the St Peters Western swim club, where he is coached by Dean Boxall.

== Career ==
=== 2021–2022 ===
After being named to the 2021 Australian World Junior Team, Staples took part in a training camp, held in Darwin before the 2021 Australian Swimming Championships, as one of two contingents, the other including senior Australian swimmers Kyle Chalmers and Travis Mahoney. The following year, he won the bronze medal in the 800-metre freestyle at the 2022 Australian Swimming Championships, held in Adelaide in May, with a time of 7:58.26. He also placed fifth in the 400-metre freestyle with a 3:50.07, fifth in the 1500-metre freestyle with a 15:23.55, and eighth in the 400-metre individual medley with a 4:26.24. Based on his results, he was named to the Australia roster for the 2022 Junior Pan Pacific Swimming Championships.

==== 2022 Junior Pan Pacific Championships ====
2022 Junior Pan Pac Championships
Gold medal – first place	1500 m freestyle	15:18.54
Gold medal – first place	4×200 m freestyle	7:13.07 (CR)
Gold medal – first place	400 m freestyle	3:48.36 (CR)
Gold medal – first place	800 m freestyle	7:56.29

Day one of competition at the Veterans Memorial Aquatic Center in Honolulu, United States, for the 2022 Junior Pan Pacific Swimming Championships in August, Staples won the gold medal in the 1500-metre freestyle with a personal best time of 15:18.54, earning nine points for Australia. The following day, he placed eighth in the 400-metre individual medley, finishing in a time of 4:29.97 and scoring one point for Australia. Later in the same finals session, he helped win the gold medal in the 4×200-metre freestyle relay in a Championships record time of 7:13.07, contributing a time of 1:47.84 for the fourth leg of the relay in the final. In the 400-metre freestyle on day three, he won the gold medal in a personal best and Championships record time of 3:48.36, lowering the record over two full seconds from the 3:50.51 it was set at in 2010 by Nicholas Caldwell of the United States, and achieved nine points for Australia. For the 4×100-metre freestyle relay later in the same session, he split a 50.79 for the anchor leg of the relay, helping finish second in a time of 3:21.42 swimming exhibition.

The fourth and final day of competition, Staples won the gold medal in the 800-metre freestyle with a personal best time of 7:56.29, which was just 1.13 seconds off the Championships record of 7:55.16 set by Robert Finke of the United States in 2016 and earned nine additional points for Australia. Between his three gold medals in his individual freestyle events and the three gold medals won by fellow Australian Flynn Southam in the 50-metre freestyle, 100-metre freestyle, and 200-metre freestyle, the 2022 Championships marked the first time swimmers representing Australia won all possible gold medals in the men's individual freestyle events at a single Junior Pan Pacific Swimming Championships. When points were summed for each athlete across their individual events, he was the highest scoring male competitor with 28 points, which was five points lower than the highest scoring female competitor Erin Gemmell of the United States.

=== 2023 ===
On the first day of the 2023 Australian Swimming Championships, in April in Gold Coast, Queensland, Staples ranked fourth in the preliminaries of the 400-metre freestyle with a 3:52.90 and qualified for the evening final, where he placed sixth in a time of 3:52.43 that was 0.05 seconds ahead of seventh-place finisher Mack Horton. For the second day, he placed second in the age final of the 200-metre freestyle with a 1:50.48 before placing sixth in the 1500-metre freestyle with a 15:44.96. On the third evening, he placed fifth in the 200-metre individual medley with a personal best time of 2:02.44 and sixth in the 800-metre freestyle with a 8:09.43. The fourth day, he improved upon his eighth-place finish in the 400-metre individual medley from the same competition in 2022, this time placing seventh with a 4:25.75.

In June, at the 2023 Australian Swimming Trials in Melbourne, Staples placed seventeenth in the 400-metre freestyle on day one with a 3:57.40, fifty-second in the 200-metre freestyle on day two with a 1:57.07, and eighth in the 800-metre freestyle on day three with a 8:06.11.

== International championships (50 m) ==
Meet	400 freestyle	800 freestyle	1500 freestyle	400 medley	4×100 freestyle	4×200 freestyle
PACJ 2022 (age: 18)	(gold) (3:48.36 CR)	(gold) (7:56.29)	(gold) (15:18.54)	8th (4:29.97)	exb^{[a]} (split 50.79, 4th leg)	(gold) (split 1:47.84, 4th leg)

^{a} Staples swam only in exhibition.

== Personal best times ==
=== Long course metres (50 m pool) ===
Event	Time	Meet	Location	Date	Ref
400 m freestyle	3:48.36	2022 Junior Pan Pacific Championships	Honolulu, United States	26 August 2022	
800 m freestyle	7:56.29	2022 Junior Pan Pacific Championships	Honolulu, United States	27 August 2022	
1500 m freestyle	15:18.54	2022 Junior Pan Pacific Championships	Honolulu, United States	24 August 2022	
