= Flynn Southam =

Australian swimmer

Personal information
- Nationality: Australian
- Born: 5 June 2005 (age 21) Murdoch, Western Australia
- Height: 1.90 m (6 ft 3 in)

Sport
- Sport: Swimming
- Strokes: Freestyle
- Club: Bond University
- Coach: Chris Mooney
Medal record
Men's swimming
Representing Australia
Event	1st	2nd	3rd
Olympic Games	0	1	1
World Championships (LC)	3	0	2
World Championships (SC)	1	3	1
Commonwealth Games	7	1	0
World Junior Championships	2	2	1
Junior Pan Pac Championships	4	2	0
Total	17	9	5
Olympic Games
Silver medal – second place	2024 Paris	4×100 m freestyle
Bronze medal – third place	2024 Paris	4x200 m freestyle
World Championships (LC)
Gold medal – first place	2023 Fukuoka	4×100 m freestyle
Gold medal – first place	2023 Fukuoka	4×100 m mixed freestyle
Gold medal – first place	2025 Singapore	4×100 m freestyle
Bronze medal – third place	2023 Fukuoka	4×200 m freestyle
Bronze medal – third place	2025 Singapore	4×200 m freestyle
World Championships (SC)
Gold medal – first place	2022 Melbourne	4×50 m freestyle
Silver medal – second place	2022 Melbourne	4×100 m freestyle
Silver medal – second place	2022 Melbourne	4×200 m freestyle
Silver medal – second place	2022 Melbourne	4×50 m mixed freestyle
Bronze medal – third place	2022 Melbourne	4×50 m medley
Commonwealth Games
Gold medal – first place	2022 Birmingham	4×100 m freestyle
Gold medal – first place	2022 Birmingham	4×200 m freestyle
Gold medal – first place	2022 Birmingham	4×100 m mixed freestyle
Gold medal – first place	2026 Glasgow	100 m freestyle
Gold medal – first place	2026 Glasgow	4×100 m freestyle
Gold medal – first place	2026 Glasgow	4×100 m medley
Gold medal – first place	2026 Glasgow	4×100 m mixed freestyle
Silver medal – second place	2026 Glasgow	50 m freestyle
World Junior Championships
Gold medal – first place	2023 Netanya	200 m freestyle
Gold medal – first place	2023 Netanya	4×100 m mixed freestyle
Silver medal – second place	2023 Netanya	50 m freestyle
Silver medal – second place	2023 Netanya	4×100 m freestyle
Bronze medal – third place	2023 Netanya	4×200 m freestyle
Junior Pan Pacific Championships
Gold medal – first place	2022 Honolulu	50 m freestyle
Gold medal – first place	2022 Honolulu	100 m freestyle
Gold medal – first place	2022 Honolulu	200 m freestyle
Gold medal – first place	2022 Honolulu	4×200 m freestyle
Silver medal – second place	2022 Honolulu	4×100 m freestyle
Silver medal – second place	2022 Honolulu	4×100 m medley

Flynn Southam (born 5 June 2005) is an Australian swimmer. At the 2022 Junior Pan Pacific Championships, he won gold medals in the 50 metre freestyle, 100 metre freestyle, and 200 metre freestyle. In the 4×100 metre freestyle relay, he won a gold medal at the 2022 Commonwealth Games as well as silver medals at the 2022 Junior Pan Pacific Championships and the 2022 World Short Course Championships, swimming on the finals relay at each competition. In the 4×200 metre freestyle relay, he won gold medals as a finals relay member at the 2022 Commonwealth Games and 2022 Junior Pan Pacific Championships, and a silver medal at the 2022 World Short Course Championships.

== Background ==
Southam was born 5 June 2005 in Australia. He trains at Bond University in Gold Coast, Queensland under the guidance of head coach Chris Mooney.

== Career ==
=== 2022 ===
==== 2022 Australian Swimming Championships ====
At the 2022 Australian Swimming Championships, held in Adelaide in May, Southam qualified for the 2022 Commonwealth Games in the 4×100 metre freestyle relay, based on his time of 48.76 and third-place finish in the 100 metre freestyle, and the 4×200 metre freestyle relay, based on his fourth-place finish in the 200 metre freestyle with a time of 1:46.82.

==== 2022 Commonwealth Games ====
On day one of swimming competition at the 2022 Commonwealth Games, conducted at Sandwell Aquatics Centre in Birmingham, England starting in July, Southam won a gold medal in the 4×100 metre mixed freestyle relay, contributing a split of 49.21 for the first leg of the preliminaries before being substituted out for William Yang in the final. The following day, he won a second gold medal, this time leading off the 4×100 metre freestyle relay in the final with a time of 48.54 seconds to help achieve a new Games record time of 3:11.12 with finals relay teammates Zac Incerti, William Yang, and Kyle Chalmers. Two days later, he went three for three in his relay events, helping win the gold medal in the 4×200 metre freestyle relay in a Games record time of 7:04.96 by contributing a split of 1:46.08 for the second leg of the relay in the final. In his final event, the 50 metre freestyle, he placed tenth in the semifinals with a time of 22.60 seconds.

==== 2022 Junior Pan Pacific Championships ====
2022 Junior Pan Pac Championships
Gold medal – first place	200 m freestyle	1:47.11 (CR)
Gold medal – first place	100 m freestyle	48.23 (CR)
Gold medal – first place	4×200 m freestyle	7:13.07 (CR)
Gold medal – first place	50 m freestyle	22.36
Silver medal – second place	4×100 m freestyle	3:18.06
Silver medal – second place	4×100 m medley	3:36.96

For the 2022 Junior Pan Pacific Swimming Championships, held at Veterans Memorial Aquatic Center in August in Honolulu, United States, Southam won the gold medal in the 200 metre freestyle with a Championships record of 1:47.11, breaking former record of 1:47.65 set by Drew Kibler in 2018. The following day, he won the gold medal in the 100 metre freestyle with a Championships record time of 48.23 seconds, lowering the former mark of 48.91 established by Jack Cartwright in 2016, and finishing over one full second ahead of silver medalist Thomas Heilman of the United States. Later in the finals session, he helped win the gold medal in the 4×200 metre freestyle relay in a Championships record time of 7:13.07, leading off the relay with a time of 1:47.30. On the third day, he helped win the silver medal in the 4×100 metre freestyle relay in a final time of 3:18.06, leading-off the relay with a 48.43.

Starting off the fourth and final day, Southam ranked third in the preliminaries of the 50 metre freestyle with a time of 22.75 seconds and qualified for the final. For his first event of the evening finals session, he won the gold medal in the 50 metre freestyle, finishing in a time of 22.36 seconds, which was 0.14 seconds ahead of the two Americans who tied for the silver medal. Concluding the Championships, he helped win the silver medal in the 4×100 metre medley relay, splitting a 47.87 for the freestyle leg of the relay to contribute to the final mark of 3:36.96. Across his individual events, he earned a total of 27 points for his placings, ranking as the second highest scoring male swimmer, only one point behind fellow Australian Joshua Staples.

==== 2022 World Short Course Championships ====
2022 World Championships (SC)
Gold medal – first place	4×50 m freestyle	1:23.44 (OC)
Silver medal – second place	4×100 m freestyle	3:04.63 (OC)
Silver medal – second place	4×50 m mixed freestyle	1:28.03 (h)
Silver medal – second place	4×200 m freestyle	6:46.54 (OC)
Bronze medal – third place	4×50 m medley	1:30.81 (h)

Southam was named to the Team Australia roster in early September for the 2022 World Short Course Championships in Melbourne, which was a little over two months before the start of competition. On the first day of competition, 13 December, he contributed a split time of 46.55 seconds for the second leg of the 4×100 metre freestyle relay in the preliminaries to help qualify the relay to the final ranking fourth with a time of 3:07.02. In the evening final, he helped win the silver medal in an Oceanian, Commonwealth and Australian record time of 3:04.63, leading-off the relay with a personal best time of 47.04. The third morning, he swam the third leg of the 4×50 metre freestyle relay in the preliminaries in 21.08 seconds, which contributed to a time of 1:24.42 that qualified the relay to the final ranking fifth. For the final, he swam a 21.10 for the third leg, helping set new Oceanian, Commonwealth, Australian, and Australian All Comers records of 1:23.44 and win the gold medal.

Leading-off the 4×50 metre mixed freestyle relay in the morning preliminaries on day four with a 22.04, Southam helped qualify the relay to the final ranking second in 1:29.82. Later in the same preliminaries session, he split a 1:42.20 for the second leg of the 4×200 metre freestyle relay to help advance the relay to the final ranked fourth with a time of 6:54.83. On the finals 4×50 metre mixed freestyle relay, Kyle Chalmers substituted in for him and he won a silver medal for his efforts when the relay placed second in 1:28.03. In his second event of the evening, he split a 1:41.50 for the third leg of the 4×200 metre freestyle relay to help win the silver medal in an Oceanian, Commonwealth, and Australian record time of 6:46.54. The fifth morning, he helped advance the 4×50 metre medley relay to the final ranking seventh with a time of 1:33.25, swimming a 21.28 for the freestyle leg of the relay. He won a bronze medal in the event when the finals relay placed third in a time of 1:30.81.

=== 2023 ===
At the 2023 New South Wales State Open Championships in March in Sydney, Southam won the gold medal in the 200 metre freestyle with a 1:47.08, placed fourth in the final of the 100 metre freestyle with a 49.08, eighth in the final of the 50 metre freestyle with a 22.78, and fifth in the 1500 metre freestyle with a 16:01.14. The following month, in the preliminaries of the 200 metre freestyle on day two at the 2023 Australian Swimming Championships, he ranked third and qualified for the final with a time of 1:47.53. He won a silver medal in the final with a personal best time of 1:46.67. The following day, he won the bronze medal in the 50 metre freestyle with a personal best time of 22.32 seconds. On the fourth and final day, he won the bronze medal in the 100 metre freestyle with a time of 48.53 seconds before winning the national title in the 4×100 metre freestyle relay, where he split a 47.71 for the anchor leg of the relay to help finish in 3:18.35. Following the Championships, he was named to the Swimming Australia roster for the 2023 World Junior Championships.

For his first event at the 2023 Australian Swimming Trials in June in Melbourne, Southam placed fifth in the final of the 200 metre freestyle with a 1:47.11.

== International championships (50 m) ==
Meet	50 freestyle	100 freestyle	200 freestyle	4×100 freestyle	4×200 freestyle	4×100 medley	4×100 mixed freestyle
Junior level
PACJ 2022	1st place, gold medalist(s)	1st place, gold medalist(s)	1st place, gold medalist(s)	2nd place, silver medalist(s)	1st place, gold medalist(s)	2nd place, silver medalist(s)	—N/a
WJR 2023	2nd place, silver medalist(s)	9th	1st place, gold medalist(s)	2nd place, silver medalist(s)	3rd place, bronze medalist(s)	5th	1st place, gold medalist(s)
Senior level
CG 2022	10th			1st place, gold medalist(s)	1st place, gold medalist(s)		(gold) ^{[a]}
WC 2023		11th		1st place, gold medalist(s)	3rd place, bronze medalist(s)		1st place, gold medalist(s)

^{a} Southam swam only in the prelims heats.

== International championships (25 m) ==
Meet	4×50 freestyle	4×100 freestyle	4×200 freestyle	4×50 medley	4×50 mixed freestyle
SCW 2022	1st place, gold medalist(s)	2nd place, silver medalist(s)	2nd place, silver medalist(s)	(bronze) ^{[a]}	(silver) ^{[a]}

^{a} Southam swam only in the prelims heats.

== Personal best times ==
=== Long course metres (50 m pool) ===
Event	Time	Meet	Location	Date	Age	Ref
50 m freestyle	22.32	2023 Australian Swimming Championships	Gold Coast	19 April 2023	17	
100 m freestyle	48.23	2022 Junior Pan Pacific Championships	Honolulu, United States	25 August 2022	17	
200 m freestyle	1:46.67	2023 Australian Swimming Championships	Gold Coast	18 April 2023	17	
50 m backstroke	27.06	2020 McDonald's Queensland Championships	Brisbane	16 December 2020	15	
100 m backstroke	55.90	2021 Australian Age Group Championships	Gold Coast	10 April 2021	15	

=== Short course metres (50 m pool) ===
Event	Time		Meet	Location	Date	Age	Ref
50 m freestyle	22.29		2021 Queensland Championships	Brisbane	19 September 2021	16	
100 m freestyle	47.04	r	2022 World Short Course Championships	Melbourne	13 December 2022	17	
200 m freestyle	1:53.56		2019 State Teams Championships	Canberra	6 October 2019	14	
50 m backstroke	25.85		2021 Queensland Championships	Brisbane	19 September 2021	16	
100 m backstroke	53.62		2021 Queensland Championships	Brisbane	18 September 2021	16	

Legend: r – relay 1st leg

== Continental and national records ==
=== Short course metres (25 m pool) ===
No.	Event	Time	Meet	Location	Date	Age	Type	Status	Notes	Ref
1	4×100 m freestyle	3:04.63	2022 World Short Course Championships	Melbourne	13 December 2022	17	OC, NR	Current	CR	
2	4×50 m freestyle	1:23.44	2022 World Short Course Championships	Melbourne	15 December 2022	17	OC, NR, ACR	Current	CR	
3	4×200 m freestyle	6:46.54	2022 World Short Course Championships	Melbourne	16 December 2022	17	OC, NR	Current	CR	

Legend: OC – Oceanian record; CR – Commonwealth record; NR – Australian record; ACR – Australian All Comers record;
Records not set in finals: h – heat; sf – semifinal; r – relay 1st leg; rh – relay heat 1st leg; b – B final; † – en route to final mark; so – swim-off; tt – time trial

== Awards and honours ==
- Hancock Prospecting Swimming Excellence scholarship, holder: 2023
