= Thomas Heilman =

American swimmer (born 2007)

Personal information
- National team: United States
- Born: February 7, 2007 (age 19) Virginia, U.S.
- Height: 6 ft 3 in (191 cm)

Sport
- Sport: Swimming
- Strokes: Butterfly, freestyle, individual medley
- Club: Cavalier Aquatics
- College team: University of Virginia
Medal record
Men's swimming
Representing United States
Event	1st	2nd	3rd
World Championships (LC)	1	0	0
Pan Pacific Championships	0	0	1
Junior Pan Pac Championships	3	3	0
Total	4	3	1
Olympic Games
Silver medal – second place	2024 Paris	4 × 100 m medley
World Championships (LC)
Gold medal – first place	2023 Fukuoka	4×100 m medley
Pan Pacific Championships
Bronze medal – third place	2026 Irvine	4×100 m medley
Junior Pan Pac Championships
Gold medal – first place	2022 Honolulu	100 m butterfly
Gold medal – first place	2022 Honolulu	4×100 m freestyle
Gold medal – first place	2022 Honolulu	4×100 m medley
Silver medal – second place	2022 Honolulu	100 m freestyle
Silver medal – second place	2022 Honolulu	200 m butterfly
Silver medal – second place	2022 Honolulu	4×200 m freestyle
U.S. Open Championships
Silver medal – second place	2021 Greensboro	100 m butterfly
Bronze medal – third place	2021 Greensboro	200 m butterfly

Thomas Heilman (/ˈhaɪlmən/ HYLE-mən; born February 7, 2007) is an American competitive swimmer. He is a world junior record holder in the long course 4×100 meter freestyle relay. He is also a 2022 Junior Pan Pacific Championships gold medalist in the 100 meter butterfly, 4×100 meter freestyle relay, and 4×100 meter medley relay, and a silver medalist in the 100 meter freestyle, 200 meter butterfly, and 4×200 meter freestyle relay. He participated in the 100 meter and 200 meter butterfly events at the 2024 Paris Olympics.

== Background ==
Heilman attended Western Albemarle High School in Crozet, Virginia and trains with the swim club Cavalier Aquatics. He has an older brother, Matthew, who is a competitive swimmer as well. On October 21, 2023, Heilman committed to swim for the University of Virginia beginning in Fall 2025.

== Career ==
=== 2021–2022 ===
By early 2022, Heilman had amassed over ten National Age Group records, fastest times ever swum by an American swimmer under 18 years of age and bracketed into age groups, including setting a record of 53.27 seconds in the 100 meter butterfly, which broke the former record that had been set by Michael Andrew. In December 2021 alone, he set fourteen National Age Group records in a time span of 11 days. At the 2022 USA Swimming International Team Trials, held in Greensboro, North Carolina, he qualified for the United States roster for the 2022 Junior Pan Pacific Swimming Championships in the 50 meter freestyle, 100 meter butterfly, and 200 meter butterfly. Following his addition to the team roster, he was announced as a nominee for the "Boys Rising Star of the Year", a High School Sports Award by USA Today. The following month, in August at the 2022 Junior National Championships, he won the 100 meter freestyle with a time that made him the first 15-year-old male American swimmer in history to swim the race faster than 50 seconds.

2022 Junior Pan Pacific Championships

2022 Junior Pan Pac Championships
Gold medal – first place	100 m butterfly	51.98 (CR, NAG)
Gold medal – first place	4×100 m freestyle	3:15.79 (WJ, CR)
Gold medal – first place	4×100 m medley	3:36.65 (CR)
Silver medal – second place	200 m butterfly	1:56.52
Silver medal – second place	100 m freestyle	49.34
Silver medal – second place	4×200 m freestyle	7:15.18

The first day of competition at the 2022 Junior Pan Pacific Swimming Championships, contested in Honolulu at the Veterans Memorial Aquatic Center, Heilman won the silver medal in the 200 meter butterfly with a personal best time of 1:56.52, which ranked him as the fourth-fastest American 15 to 16 years of age in history in the event, behind Michael Phelps, Luca Urlando, and Andrew Seliskar. The second day, he ranked first in the preliminaries of the 100 meter freestyle with a personal best time of 49.06 seconds. His time set a new National Age Group record for the boys 15-16 age group, lowering the former mark set by Caeleb Dressel in 2013 at 49.28 seconds by over two-tenths of a second. In the evening final, he won the silver medal with a time of 49.34 seconds, finishing 1.11 seconds behind gold medalist Flynn Southam of Australia. The start of the race was delayed from the initially set start time due to heavy rain, competition was conducted at an outdoor pool. With a split of 1:47.98 for the second leg of the 4×200 meter freestyle relay later in the same finals session, he helped win the silver medal in a time of 7:15.18.

On the third morning, Heilman swam a 52.75 in the preliminary heats of the 100 meter butterfly, qualifying for the final ranking second behind Jesse Coleman of Australia. He edged out Jesse Coleman in the final by 0.25 seconds to win the gold medal in a Championships record and personal best time of 51.98 seconds. His time marked the fastest time ever swum by a male American swimmer in the 15–16 age group, lowering the former National Age Group record of 52.40 set by Luca Urlando. Later in the session, he led-off the 4×100 meter freestyle relay with a 49.14 to help win the gold medal in a world junior record and Championships record time of 3:15.79. Sprinting to a finish in a time of 23.05 seconds in the preliminary heats of the 50 meter freestyle on the fourth and final day, he qualified for the b-final ranking first, 0.17 seconds ahead of fellow American and second-ranked Daniel Diehl. He withdrew from competing in the b-final prior to the start of the race. Splitting a 51.71 for the butterfly portion of the 4×100 meter medley relay, he contributed to a new Championships record of and gold medal-win in 3:36.65.

2022 Swimming World Cup

For his first FINA Swimming World Cup, Heilman chose a home-country debut, entering to compete in the 100 meter freestyle, 200 meter freestyle, and the 50 meter, 100 meter, and 200 meter butterfly events at the 2022 Swimming World Cup in Indianapolis. Day one of three, he placed eighteenth in the morning preliminary heats of the 100 meter butterfly with a personal best time of 51.68 seconds, not qualifying for the evening final. The second day, he started off with a rank of twenty-second in the 100 meter freestyle with a personal best time of 48.32 seconds, which was 0.05 seconds behind twenty-first ranked fellow American Hunter Armstrong and 1.71 seconds behind first ranked Kyle Chalmers of Australia. Later in the same session, he ranked twelfth in the preliminary heats of the 200 meter butterfly, 4.40 seconds slower than first ranked fellow American Trenton Julian with a personal best time of 1:55.44.

On the third and final day, Heilman placed thirteenth in the 50 meter butterfly with a personal best time of 23.34 seconds, which was 0.40 seconds behind eighth-rank final qualifier Matthew Temple of Australia. Later in the morning, he placed thirty-second in the 200 meter freestyle with a personal best time of 1:48.75.

2022 Winter Junior National Championships

Day two of the East edition of the 2022 Winter Junior US National Championships, held in December in Greensboro, Heilman won the 200 yard individual medley with a boys 15–16 National Age Group record time of 1:41.71. The following day, he won the 100 yard butterfly with a boys 15–16 National Age Group record time of 44.67 seconds that was almost one second faster than the former record of 45.62 seconds set by Luca Urlando approximately four years earlier. He finished his individual events off with a National Age Group record for the same age group on day four of four, this time winning the 200 yard butterfly and lowering the former record of 1:40.91 from Luca Urlando by 0.05 seconds with a personal best time of 1:40.86.

=== 2023 ===
Competing at the 2023 Virginia High School Class 4 State Championships in February as a sophomore, Heilman won individual titles in the 50 yard freestyle, with a 19.69, and the 100 yard butterfly, with a 46.06, which contributed to a win for the men's team of his school Western Albemarle. In March, he lowered his personal best time in the 100 yard freestyle to a 42.61 from his former personal best of 42.96 attained on a relay lead-off leg at the 2022 Winter Junior National Championships.

=== 2024 ===
Heilman competed in the US Olympic Swimming Trials in the 100 and 200 meter butterfly events. He received first place in the latter event with a time of 1.54.50. In the 100 meter butterfly, Heilman got second place and a time of 50.80. This time beat the prior age group time in the event set by Michael Phelps by 0.03 seconds. These swims qualified him for the 2024 Paris Olympics.

At the 2024 Paris Olympics, Heilman swam the 100 butterfly, 200 butterfly, and also swam in the preliminaries of the 4x100 Meter Medley Relay. He achieved 18th place in the 100 meter butterfly, and 10th place in the 200 meter butterfly. Additionally, for the 4x100 Meter Medley Relay, the US team went on to get silver in the finals.

=== 2025 ===
Heilman competed in the 2025 USA Swimming Championships, and earned silver in the 100 meter butterfly, setting a national age group record at 50.70 and qualifying him for the 2025 World Aquatics Championships. He placed 26th overall with a time of 52.02.

== International championships ==
Meet	50 freestyle	100 freestyle	100 butterfly	200 butterfly	4×100 freestyle	4×200 freestyle	4×100 medley
PACJ 2022	WD	2nd place, silver medalist(s)	1st place, gold medalist(s)	2nd place, silver medalist(s)	1st place, gold medalist(s)	2nd place, silver medalist(s)	1st place, gold medalist(s)

== Personal best times ==
=== Long course meters (50 m pool) ===
Event	Time		Meet	Location	Date	Notes	Ref
100 m freestyle	49.06	h	2022 Junior Pan Pacific Swimming Championships	Honolulu, Hawaii	August 25, 2022		
200 m freestyle	1:49.13		2023 PV-NCAP Elite Qualifier	Stafford, Virginia	June 2, 2023		
100 m butterfly	50.70		2025 U.S. National Championships	Indianapolis, Indiana	June 5, 2025	NAG	
200 m butterfly	1:53.82		2023 World Championships	Fukuoka, Japan	July 26, 2023	NAG	

Legend: NAG – National Age Group record;
Records not set in finals: h – heat; sf – semifinal; r – relay 1st leg; rh – relay heat 1st leg; b – B final; † – en route to final mark; so – swim-off; tt – time trial

=== Short course meters (25 m pool) ===
Event	Time		Meet	Location	Date	Ref
100 m freestyle	48.32	h	2022 FINA Swimming World Cup	Indianapolis, Indiana	November 4, 2022	
200 m freestyle	1:48.75	h	2022 FINA Swimming World Cup	Indianapolis, Indiana	November 5, 2022	
50 m butterfly	23.34	h	2022 FINA Swimming World Cup	Indianapolis, Indiana	November 5, 2022	
100 m butterfly	51.68	h	2022 FINA Swimming World Cup	Indianapolis, Indiana	November 3, 2022	
200 m butterfly	1:55.44	h	2022 FINA Swimming World Cup	Indianapolis, Indiana	November 4, 2022	

Legend: h – preliminary heat

=== Short course yards (25 yd pool) ===
Event	Time		Meet	Location	Date	Notes	Ref
100 yd freestyle	42.00		2023 Winter Junior US National Championships	Columbus, Ohio	December 9, 2023		
200 yd freestyle	1:32.26	r	2024 Winter Junior US National Championships	Greensboro, North Carolina	December 11, 2024		
100 yd butterfly	43.86		2024 Winter Junior US National Championships	Greensboro, North Carolina	December 13, 2024	NAG	
200 yd butterfly	1:38.95		2024 Winter Junior US National Championships	Greensboro, North Carolina	December 14, 2024	NAG	
200 yd individual medley	1:41.26		2024 Winter Junior US National Championships	Greensboro, North Carolina	December 12, 2024		
400 yd individual medley	3:43.63		2023 Virginia Swimming Championships	Richmond, Virginia	March 3, 2023		

Legend: NAG – National Age Group record;
Records not set in finals: h – heat; sf – semifinal; r – relay 1st leg; rh – relay heat 1st leg; b – B final; † – en route to final mark; so – swim-off; tt – time trial

== National age group records ==
=== Long course meters (50 m pool) ===
No.	Event	Time	Meet	Location	Date	Age	Age Group	Ref
1	50 m freestyle	22.95	2021 U.S. Open Championships	Greensboro, North Carolina	December 2, 2021	14	13-14	
2	100 m freestyle	51.12	2021 U.S. Open Championships	Greensboro, North Carolina	December 4, 2021	14	13-14	
3	100 m butterfly	53.27	2021 U.S. Open Championships	Greensboro, North Carolina	December 4, 2021	14	13-14	
4	100 m butterfly	51.19	2023 U.S. National Championships	Indianapolis, Indiana	June 29, 2023	16	15-16	
5	200 m butterfly	1:53.82	2023 World Championships	Fukuoka, Japan	July 26, 2023	16	15-16	
6	100 m butterfly	50.70	2025 U.S. National Championships	Indianapolis, Indiana	June 5, 2025	18	17-18	

=== Short course yards (25 yd pool) ===
No.	Event	Time		Meet	Location	Date	Age	Age Group	Ref
1	100 yd butterfly	58.36		PV-AP Winterfest	College Park, Maryland	January 13, 2018	10	10U	
2	200 yd freestyle	1:44.28		NC-YOTA 27th Arena Capital Classic	Cary, North Carolina	December 6, 2019	12	11-12	
3	200 yd butterfly	1:53.66		NC-YOTA 27th Arena Capital Classic	Cary, North Carolina	December 7, 2019	12	11-12	
4	50 yd freestyle	21.50		NC-YOTA 27th Arena Capital Classic	Cary, North Carolina	December 7, 2019	12	11-12	
5	100 yd freestyle	47.15		NC-YOTA 27th Arena Capital Classic	Cary, North Carolina	December 8, 2019	12	11-12	
6	100 yd butterfly	50.82		VA-CYAC Winter Invitational	Charlottesville, Virginia	January 25, 2020	12	11-12	
7	100 yd freestyle	43.51	r	NC-YOTA 28th Arena Capital Classic	Cary, North Carolina	December 5, 2021	14	13-14	
8	4×100 m freestyle	3:07.45		NC-YOTA 28th Arena Capital Classic	Cary, North Carolina	December 5, 2021	14	13-14	
9	200 yd freestyle	1:34.68		2021 Winter Junior US National Championships	Greensboro, North Carolina	December 10, 2021	14	13-14	
10	100 yd butterfly	45.81		2021 Winter Junior US National Championships	Greensboro, North Carolina	December 10, 2021	14	13-14	
11	200 yd butterfly	1:42.77		2021 Winter Junior US National Championships	Greensboro, North Carolina	December 11, 2021	14	13-14	
12	100 yd butterfly	44.67		2022 Winter Junior US National Championships	Greensboro, North Carolina	December 9, 2022	15	15-16	
13	200 yd freestyle	1:32.46	r	2023 Winter Junior US National Championships	Columbus, Ohio	December 6, 2023	16	15–16	
14	50 yd freestyle	19.24		2023 Winter Junior US National Championships	Columbus, Ohio	December 7, 2023	16	15-16	
15	200 yd individual medley	1:41.41		2023 Winter Junior US National Championships	Columbus, Ohio	December 7, 2023	16	15-16	
16	4×100 m medley	3:08.95		2023 Winter Junior US National Championships	Columbus, Ohio	December 7, 2023	16	15-18	
17	200 yd butterfly	1:40.73		2023 Winter Junior US National Championships	Columbus, Ohio	December 9, 2023	16	15-16	
18	100 yd butterfly	43.86		2024 Winter Junior US National Championships	Greensboro, North Carolina	December 13, 2024	17	17-18	
19	200 yd butterfly	1:38.95		2024 Winter Junior US National Championships	Greensboro, North Carolina	December 14, 2024	17	17-18	

Legend: r – relay 1st leg

== World records ==
=== World junior records ===
==== Long course meters (50 m pool) ====
No.	Event	Time	Meet	Location	Date	Age	Status	Ref
1	4×100 m freestyle	3:15.79	2022 Junior Pan Pacific Swimming Championships	Honolulu, Hawaii	August 26, 2022	15 years, 200 days	Current	

== Awards and honors ==
- USA Today, High School Sports Awards, Boys Rising Star of the Year, nominee: 2021–2022
