= Erin Gemmell =

American swimmer (born 2004)

Personal information
- National team: United States
- Born: December 2, 2004 (age 21) Potomac, Maryland, U.S.

Sport
- Sport: Swimming
- Strokes: Freestyle
- Club: Nation's Capital Swim Club
- Coach: Bruce Gemmell
Medal record
Women's swimming
Representing United States
Event	1st	2nd	3rd
World Championships (LC)	0	3	0
World Championships (SC)	1	1	1
Pan Pacific Championships	0	1	0
World Junior Championships	2	0	0
Junior Pan Pac Championships	6	0	1
Total	9	5	2
Olympic Games
Silver medal – second place	2024 Paris	4×200 m freestyle
World Championships (LC)
Silver medal – second place	2023 Fukuoka	4×200 m freestyle
Silver medal – second place	2025 Singapore	4×100 m freestyle
Silver medal – second place	2025 Singapore	4×200 m freestyle
World Championships (SC)
Gold medal – first place	2022 Melbourne	4×50 m freestyle
Silver medal – second place	2022 Melbourne	4×100 m freestyle
Bronze medal – third place	2022 Melbourne	4×200 m freestyle
Pan Pacific Championships
Silver medal – second place	2026 Irvine	4×200 m freestyle
World Junior Championships
Gold medal – first place	2019 Budapest	4×200 m freestyle
Gold medal – first place	2019 Budapest	4×100 m freestyle
Junior Pan Pac Championships
Gold medal – first place	2022 Honolulu	100 m freestyle
Gold medal – first place	2022 Honolulu	200 m freestyle
Gold medal – first place	2022 Honolulu	400 m freestyle
Gold medal – first place	2022 Honolulu	4×100 m freestyle
Gold medal – first place	2022 Honolulu	4×200 m freestyle
Gold medal – first place	2022 Honolulu	4×100 m medley
Bronze medal – third place	2022 Honolulu	50 m freestyle

Erin Gemmell (/ˈɡɛməl/ GHEM-əl; born December 2, 2004) is an American competitive swimmer. She is an American record holder in the short course 4×200 meter freestyle relay. In the 200 metre freestyle, she won the gold medal at the 2022 Junior Pan Pacific Championships and placed fourth at the 2022 World Short Course Championships. In the 400 meter freestyle, she won the gold medal at the 2022 Junior Pan Pacific Championships, the 2022 US National title, and placed sixth at the 2022 World Short Course Championships. For the 4×200 meter freestyle relay, she won a bronze medal at the 2022 World Short Course Championships as well as gold medals at the 2019 World Junior Championships and 2022 Junior Pan Pacific Championships, swimming on the finals relay at each competition. At the 2024 Paris Olympics, Gemmell, along with Claire Weinstein, Katie Ledecky, and Paige Madden, won the silver medal in the 4 × 200 m freestyle relay.

== Background ==
Gemmell was born December 2, 2004, in the United States. Her mother, Barbara, was a competitive swimmer at Northwestern University, her father, Bruce, was an All Big Ten swimmer and Captain of the University of Michigan swim team and is currently a swim coach, and her brother, Andrew, is also a competitive swimmer. She attended Stone Ridge School of the Sacred Heart in Bethesda, Maryland, where she competed as part of the school swim team. For collegiate swimming, she competes for the University of Texas swim team since the autumn of 2023.

== Career ==
=== 2019–2021 ===
==== 2019 World Junior Championships ====
2019 World Junior Championships
Gold medal – first place	4×200 m freestyle	7:55.49
Gold medal – first place	4×100 m freestyle	3:37.61 (h)

At the 2019 FINA World Junior Swimming Championships, held at Danube Arena in Budapest, Hungary, Gemmell won two gold medals, the first of which was in the 4×200 meter freestyle relay where she swam on both the prelims and the finals relay, splitting a 1:59.70 for the second leg of the relay in the final to help finish in 7:55.49, and the second of which was in the 4×100 meter freestyle relay where she contributed a split time of 55.52 seconds in the preliminaries before the finals relay finished in a time of 3:37.61 to place first.

==== 2021 Swimming World Cup ====
For the first stop of the 2021 FINA Swimming World Cup held in Berlin, Germany, Gemmell won the bronze medal in the 400 meter freestyle with a time of 4:05.61 to finish over five seconds behind gold medalist Isabel Gose of Germany. One stop later, in Budapest, Hungary, she improved upon her time, swimming a personal best of 4:03.28 to place fourth. She also won the bronze medal in the 200 meter freestyle, finishing less than two seconds behind gold medalist Madison Wilson of Australia and silver medalist Katja Fain of Slovenia with a personal best time of 1:55.04.

=== 2022 ===
==== 2022 US International Team Trials ====
In April, at the 2022 USA Swimming International Team Trials in Greensboro, Gemmell swam 2022 Junior Pan Pacific Swimming Championships qualifying times in the 200 meter freestyle, a 1:58.12, and the 400 meter freestyle, a 4:13.63, and was named to the United States roster in both events. Three months later, in July at the 2022 US National Swimming Championships in Irvine, she won the silver medal in the 200 meter freestyle with a personal best time of 1:56.14, finishing 1.64 seconds behind gold medalist Katie Ledecky. Two days later at the Championships, she won the national title and gold medal in the 400 meter freestyle with a personal best time of 4:06.17.

==== 2022 Junior Pan Pacific Championships ====
2022 Junior Pan Pac Championships
Gold medal – first place	200 m freestyle	1:56.15 (CR)
Gold medal – first place	100 m freestyle	54.13 (CR)
Gold medal – first place	4×200 m freestyle	7:54.70 (CR)
Gold medal – first place	400 m freestyle	4:05.07 (CR)
Gold medal – first place	4×100 m freestyle	3:37.99 (CR)
Gold medal – first place	4×100 m medley	4:02.14 (CR)
Bronze medal – third place	50 m freestyle	25.46

Starting off the 2022 Junior Pan Pacific Swimming Championships on day one, held at Veterans Memorial Aquatic Center in Honolulu in August, Gemmell won the gold medal in the 200 meter freestyle with a Championships record time of 1:56.15 in the final after setting a new Championships record of 1:56.66 in the preliminaries of event to qualify for the final ranking first. The following morning, she set a new Championships record of 54.42 seconds in the preliminaries of the 100 meter freestyle, lowering the previous mark of 54.47 seconds set by Gretchen Walsh in 2018, and qualifying for the final. She lowered her Championships record and personal best time to 54.13 seconds in the final, winning the gold medal. For her final event of the day, the 4×200 meter freestyle relay, she anchored the relay to a first-place finish with a 1:54.86, helping achieve a new Championships record of 7:54.70.

Day three, Gemmell ranked first overall in the preliminaries of the 400 meter freestyle with a time of 4:08.53 and qualified for the final. Finishing in a personal best time of 4:05.07 in the final, she won the gold medal and set a new Championships record in the event, lowering the record over two full seconds from the former mark of 4:07.10 set in 2012 by Leah Smith. For her final event of the evening, she helped win the gold medal in the 4×100 meter freestyle relay in a Championships record time of 3:37.99, splitting a 54.29 for the third leg of the relay. On the morning of day four, she swam a personal best time of 25.42 seconds in the 50 meter freestyle preliminary heats and qualified for the final ranking second. In the evening final, she finished in a time of 25.46 seconds to win the bronze medal, finishing 0.27 seconds behind gold medalist Milla Jansen of Australia. In her final event of the Championships, she split a 53.73 for the freestyle leg of the 4×100 meter medley relay to help win the gold medal in a Championships record time of 4:02.14.

After earning points for each of her placings in her individual events throughout the Championships, Gemmell ranked as the highest scoring female, and overall, swimmer with thirty-three points, which was five points ahead of the highest scoring male swimmer, Joshua Staples of Australia.

==== 2022 Swimming World Cup ====
For her second FINA Swimming World Cup, Gemmell started off with a personal best time of 4:01.35 in the preliminary heats of the 400 meter freestyle at the 2022 FINA Swimming World Cup in Indianapolis, dropping 1.93 seconds from her former previous best time and qualifying for the final ranking third. Later the same morning, she placed twelfth in the 50 meter freestyle with a personal best time of 24.98 seconds. She improved upon her personal best time in the 400 meter freestyle evening final, winning the bronze medal with a time of 4:00.45. The next morning, she ranked fifth in the preliminary heats of the 200 meter freestyle, qualifying for the final with a personal best time of 1:54.31. She dropped an additional 1.04 seconds off her personal best time in the evening final, placing sixth with a time of 1:53.27. The following morning, she swam a personal best time of 53.14 seconds in the preliminary heats of the 100 meter freestyle, taking 2.42 seconds off her previous personal best time of 55.56 seconds and qualifying for the final ranking eighth. For the evening final, she placed seventh, lowering her personal best time to 52.97 seconds.

==== 2022 World Short Course Championships ====
2022 World Championships (SC)
Gold medal – first place	4×50 m freestyle	1:33.89 (h)
Silver medal – second place	4×100 m freestyle	3:26.29 (h)
Bronze medal – third place	4×200 m freestyle	7:34.70 (NR)

In October, Gemmell was announced as a member of the Team USA roster for the 2022 World Short Course Championships, in December in Melbourne, Australia, in the 200 meter freestyle and 400 meter freestyle. It marked her first time being named to a senior World Championships roster. On December 2, and leading up to the World Short Course Championships, she won the silver medal in the 200 meter freestyle at the 2022 U.S. Open Swimming Championships with a time of 1:57.16.

On the morning of day one, Gemmell ranked third in the preliminaries of the 400 meter freestyle with a 4:00.49 and qualified for the final. Later in the preliminaries, she split a 52.84 for the second leg of the 4×100 meter freestyle relay, helping qualify the relay for the final ranking fourth with a time of 3:31.11. At 18 years of age in the first World Championships individual final of her career, in any course and any age level, she placed sixth in the 400 meter freestyle with a time of 4:01.82. For the 4×100 meter freestyle finals relay, Kate Douglass substituted in for her and all relay members won a silver medal when the finals relay placed second in 3:26.29. The second day of competition, she won a bronze medal in the 4×200 meter freestyle relay, contributing a split time of 1:52.23 for the third leg, the fastest time amongst her finals relay teammates by over one full second, to the final time of 7:34.70, which was a new American record in the event.

For the third morning preliminaries, Gemmell contributed a 24.34 for the second leg of the 4×50 meter freestyle relay to help qualify for the final ranking third. The finals relay, for which she was substituted out, went on the finish first in 1:33.89 and she won a gold medal with the rest of the prelims and finals relay members for her efforts in the preliminaries. In the preliminaries on the sixth and final day, she qualified for the final of the 200 meter freestyle with a time of 1:53.47 and overall third-rank. In the evening finals session, she placed fourth with a personal best time of 1:52.56.

=== 2023 ===
At the 2023 Metro Championships in February in Boyds, Maryland, Gemmell contributed to an overall win for her school's team, Stone Ridge, with a new competition record and personal best time of 1:43.45 in the 200 yard freestyle that won the event, and a personal best time of 48.19 seconds in the 100 yard freestyle that won her the title in that event as well.

=== 2024 Paris Olympics ===
At the 2024 Paris Olympics, Gemmell competed along with Claire Weinstein, Katie Ledecky, and Paige Madden in the 4 × 200 m freestyle relay. With Gemmell anchoring, the team won the silver medal, Gemmell's first Olympic medal.

== International championships (50 m) ==
Meet	50 freestyle	100 freestyle	200 freestyle	400 freestyle	4×100 freestyle	4×200 freestyle	4×100 medley
WJC 2019					(gold) ^{[a]}	1st place, gold medalist(s)	
PACJ 2022	3rd place, bronze medalist(s)	1st place, gold medalist(s)	1st place, gold medalist(s)	1st place, gold medalist(s)	1st place, gold medalist(s)	1st place, gold medalist(s)	1st place, gold medalist(s)

^{a} Gemmell swam only in the preliminary heats.

== International championships (25 m) ==
Meet	200 freestyle	400 freestyle	4×50 freestyle	4×100 freestyle	4×200 freestyle
WC 2022	4th	6th	(gold) ^{[a]}	(silver) ^{[a]}	3rd place, bronze medalist(s)

^{a} Gemmell swam only in the preliminary heats.

== Personal best times ==
=== Long course meters (50 m pool) ===
Event	Time		Meet	Location	Date	Ref
50 m freestyle	25.00		2024 US Olympic Trials	Lucas Oil Stadium, Indiana	June 22, 2024	Omega Results
100 m freestyle	54.13		2022 Junior Pan Pacific Championships	Honolulu, Hawaii	August 25, 2022	
200 m freestyle	1:55.97	R	2023 World Championships	Fukuoka, Japan	July 27, 2023	
400 m freestyle	4:05.07		2022 Junior Pan Pacific Championships	Honolulu, Hawaii	August 26, 2022	

Legend: h – preliminary heat R - relay lead off

=== Short course meters (25 m pool) ===
Event	Time		Meet	Location	Date	Ref
50 m freestyle	24.98	h	2022 FINA Swimming World Cup	Indianapolis, Indiana	November 3, 2022	
100 m freestyle	52.97		2022 FINA Swimming World Cup	Indianapolis, Indiana	November 5, 2022	
200 m freestyle	1:52.56		2022 World Short Course Championships	Melbourne, Australia	December 18, 2022	
400 m freestyle	4:00.45		2022 FINA Swimming World Cup	Indianapolis, Indiana	November 3, 2022	

Legend: h – preliminary heat

=== Short course yards (25 yd pool) ===
Event	Time	Meet	Location	Date	Ref
100 yd freestyle	47.78	2024 NCAA Division I Women's Championships	Athens, Georgia	March 22, 2024	SwimCloud
200 yd freestyle	1:42.80	2024 Texas Hall of Fame Invitational	Austin, Texas	November 21, 2024	SwimCloud

== Swimming World Cup circuits ==
The following medals Gemmell has won at Swimming World Cup circuits.

Edition	Gold medals	Silver medals	Bronze medals	Total
2021	0	0	2	2
2022	0	0	1	1
Total	0	0	3	3

== National records ==
=== Short course meters (25 m pool) ===
No.	Event	Time	Meet	Location	Date	Age	Status	Ref
1	4×200 m freestyle	7:34.70	2022 World Short Course Championships	Melbourne, Australia	December 14, 2022	18	Current	
