= Daniel Diehl =

American swimmer (born 2005)

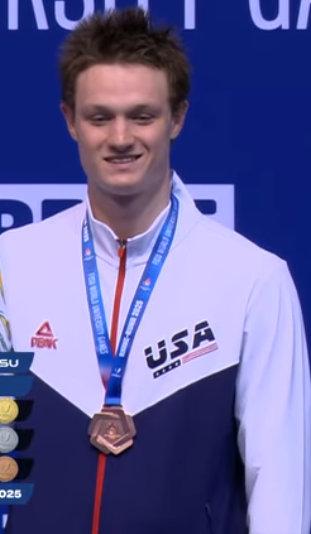
- At the 2025 Summer World University Games

Personal information
- Full name: Daniel Troxell Diehl
- National team: United States
- Born: October 26, 2005 (age 20) Cumberland, Maryland, United States

Sport
- Sport: Swimming
- Strokes: Backstroke, freestyle
- Club: Cumberland YMCA
- Coach: Brian Dowling
Medal record
Men's swimming
Representing United States
Event	1st	2nd	3rd
World University Games	1	0	2
World Junior Championships	3	2	0
Junior Pan Pac Championships	4	0	0
Total	8	2	2
World University Games
Gold medal – first place	2025 Rhine-Ruhr	200 m backstroke
Bronze medal – third place	2025 Rhine-Ruhr	50 m backstroke
Bronze medal – third place	2025 Rhine-Ruhr	100 m backstroke
World Junior Championships
Gold medal – first place	2023 Netanya	4×100 m freestyle
Gold medal – first place	2023 Netanya	4×200 m freestyle
Gold medal – first place	2023 Netanya	4×100 m medley
Silver medal – second place	2023 Netanya	200 m backstroke
Silver medal – second place	2023 Netanya	200 m medley
Junior Pan Pac Championships
Gold medal – first place	2022 Honolulu	100 m backstroke
Gold medal – first place	2022 Honolulu	4×100 m freestyle
Gold medal – first place	2022 Honolulu	4×100 m medley
Gold medal – first place	2022 Honolulu	4×100 m mixed medley
U.S. Open Championships
Gold medal – first place	2022 Greensboro	100 m backstroke
Gold medal – first place	2022 Greensboro	200 m backstroke
Bronze medal – third place	2022 Greensboro	200 m medley

Daniel Troxell Diehl (born October 26, 2005) is an American competitive swimmer. He win gold medalist in 4 × 100 m freestyle, 4 × 200 m freestyle, and 4 × 100 m medley with silver medalist in 200 m backstroke and 200 m individual medley in 2023 World Junior Championships. He is a world junior record holder in the long course 4×100 meter freestyle relay and the short course 4×50 meter mixed freestyle relay. At the 2022 Junior Pan Pacific Championships, he won gold medals in the 100 meter backstroke, 4×100 meter freestyle relay, 4×100 meter medley relay, and the 4×100 meter mixed medley relay.

== Background ==
Diehl was born October 26, 2005, in Maryland, United States. He trains under the guidance of coach Brian Dowling as part of the Cumberland YMCA swim team.

== Career ==
=== 2021–2022 ===
==== 2021 Swimming World Cup ====
Swimming the first leg of the 4×50 meter mixed freestyle relay at the 2021 FINA Swimming World Cup stop held in Berlin, Germany, Diehl contributed to a gold medal-win in a world junior record time of 1:31.50 with finals relay teammates Quintin McCarty, Kristina Paegle, and Carly Novelline. Six days later, at the stop held at Danube Arena in Budapest, Hungary, he helped win the gold medal in the 4×50 meter mixed freestyle relay again, this time splitting a 22.45 to contribute to the final mark of 1:32.34. The following day, he won the bronze medal in the 100 meter backstroke, finishing 1.77 seconds behind gold medalist and fellow American Tom Shields with a time of 52.27 seconds.

==== 2022 International Team Trials ====
The following year, at the 2022 USA Swimming International Team Trials, held in Greensboro in April, Diehl earned spots on the United States roster for the 2022 Junior Pan Pacific Swimming Championships based on his results in the 100 meter backstroke, in which he placed eighth with a time of 54.15 seconds. Leading up to the Championships, he competed at the 2022 YMCA National Championships, winning national titles in five events, including the 200 meter backstroke where he won the event with a personal best time of 1:57.62 at 16 years of age.

==== 2022 Junior Pan Pacific Championships ====
2022 Junior Pan Pac Championships
Gold medal – first place	100 m backstroke	53.27 (CR, NAG)
Gold medal – first place	4×100 m mixed medley	3:46.83 (CR)
Gold medal – first place	4×100 m freestyle	3:15.79 (WJ, CR)
Gold medal – first place	4×100 m medley	3:36.65 (CR)

Commencing competition on day one at Veterans Memorial Aquatic Center for the 2022 Junior Pan Pacific Swimming Championships, held in Honolulu in August, Diehl set a new Championships record with a personal best time of 53.40 seconds in the morning preliminaries of the 100 meter backstroke and qualified for the final ranking first. In the evening finals session, he won the gold medal with another Championships record time, this time finishing over one full second ahead of the second-place finisher with a personal best of 53.27, which set a new National Age Group record in the event for the boys 15–16 age group. Later in the finals session, he led-off the 4×100 meter mixed medley relay with a 53.42 to help win the gold medal in a new Championships record time of 3:46.83. The following day, he won the b-final of the 100 meter freestyle with a time of 50.08 seconds. In the morning on day three, he swam a 1:59.55 in the preliminaries of the 200 meter backstroke to qualify for the b-final ranking fastest out of all b-final qualifiers. He withdrew from further competition in the event prior to the start of the finals. Instead, he focused on the final of the 4×100 meter freestyle relay, swimming the fastest split time of his relay teammates with a 48.66 to contribute to a final time of 3:15.79, which set a world junior record and Championships record in the event and won the gold medal.

Day four of four, Diehl finished in a time of 23.22 seconds in the preliminaries of the 50 meter freestyle to qualify for the b-final ranking second behind Thomas Heilman. He won the b-final by over two-tenths of a second, finishing first in a time of 23.32 seconds. Later in the session he led-off the 4×100 meter medley relay with a 54.24, helping achieve a Championships record time of 3:36.65 and win the gold medal.

==== 2022 Swimming World Cup ====
At the 2022 FINA Swimming World Cup stop conducted in short course meters and held at the Indiana University Natatorium in Indianapolis in November, Diehl swam a personal best time of 1:53.71 in the morning preliminary heats of the 200 meter backstroke on day one, advancing to the final ranking sixth. For his second event of the morning, he swam a personal best time of 54.15 seconds in the 100 meter individual medley and placed twelfth. In the evening session, he took 0.42 seconds off his 200-meter backstroke personal best time with a 1:53.29 and placed eighth. Day two of three, he placed seventeenth in the 50 meter backstroke with a time of 24.29 seconds. Later in the morning, he finished in a time of 48.66 seconds in the preliminary heats of the 100 meter freestyle, placing twenty-fifth. The final day, he placed fourteenth in the 100 meter backstroke with a time of 52.29 seconds.

==== 2022 U.S. Open Championships ====
On day two of the 2022 U.S. Open Swimming Championships, December 1, Diehl swam a personal best time of 2:00.50 in the preliminary heats of the 200 meter individual medley and qualified for the final ranking second. He won the bronze medal in the evening final, this time finishing in a personal best time of 1:59.89, which was 3.37 seconds behind gold medalist Chase Kalisz. The morning of day three, he set a new National Age Group record for the boys 17–18 age group in the 100 meter backstroke preliminaries with a time of 53.11 seconds, which qualified him to the final ranking first and lowered the former record of 53.38 seconds set by Ryan Murphy in 2013 by 0.27 seconds. In the evening, he won the gold medal in another personal best and National Age Group record time of 53.07 seconds. The final morning, he tied his personal best time in the 200 meter backstroke in the preliminaries with a time of 1:57.62 and qualified for the final ranking first. For the evening final, his last race of the Championships, he swam 1.21 seconds faster than in the morning, winning the gold medal with a personal best time of 1:56.41.

==== 2022 Winter Junior National Championships ====
The following week, Diehl placed second in the 200 yard individual medley at the 2022 Winter Junior US National Championships edition East with a personal best time of 1:43.01. For day three, he swam personal best times of 46.40 seconds and 46.01 seconds in the preliminary heats and final, respectively, of the 100 yard backstroke and placed fourth. On the fourth and final day, he won the 200 yard backstroke in the evening finals session with a personal best time of 1:39.62, which was 2.10 seconds faster than the personal best time of 1:41.72 he swam in the morning to qualify for the final ranking first.

=== 2023–present ===
Diehl achieved four wins in individual events at the 2023 Speedo Sectionals conducted in long course meters in March in Indianapolis, the 200 meter backstroke with a 1:56.59 on March 23, the 100 meter butterfly with a personal best time of 53.03 seconds on March 24, the 100 meter backstroke with a 53.70 on March 25, and the 200 meter individual medley with a 2:00.18 on March 26.

In December 2023, Diehl signed a letter of intent to swim for the North Carolina State University Wolfpack. Diehl was the number two ranked swimmer in the country in his high school graduating class.

== International championships ==
Meet	50 freestyle	100 freestyle	100 backstroke	200 backstroke	4×100 freestyle	4×100 medley	4×100 mixed medley
PACJ 2022	1st (b)	1st (b)	1st place, gold medalist(s)	WD	1st place, gold medalist(s)	1st place, gold medalist(s)	1st place, gold medalist(s)

== Personal best times ==
=== Long course meters (50 m pool) ===
Event	Time	Meet	Location	Date	Notes	Ref
50 m backstroke	25.28	2023 TYR Pro Swim Series - Knoxville	Knoxville, Tennessee	January 12, 2023		
100 m backstroke	53.07	2022 U.S. Open Swimming Championships	Greensboro, North Carolina	December 2, 2022	NAG	
200 m backstroke	1:56.41	2022 U.S. Open Swimming Championships	Greensboro, North Carolina	December 3, 2022		
100 m butterfly	53.03	2023 Speedo Sectionals - Indianapolis	Indianapolis, Indiana	March 24, 2023		
200 m individual medley	1:59.89	2022 U.S. Open Swimming Championships	Greensboro, North Carolina	December 1, 2022		

Legend: NAG – USA Swimming National Age Group record (boys 17–18);
Records not set in finals: h – heat; sf – semifinal; r – relay 1st leg; rh – relay heat 1st leg; b – B final; † – en route to final mark; so – swim-off; tt – time trial

=== Short course meters (25 m pool) ===
Event	Time		Meet	Location	Date	Ref
50 m freestyle	22.41	h	2021 FINA Swimming World Cup	Berlin, Germany	October 1, 2021	
100 m freestyle	48.29	h	2021 FINA Swimming World Cup	Berlin, Germany	October 2, 2021	
50 m backstroke	24.09	h	2021 FINA Swimming World Cup	Berlin, Germany	October 2, 2021	
100 m backstroke	51.76	h	2021 FINA Swimming World Cup	Berlin, Germany	October 3, 2021	
200 m backstroke	1:53.29		2022 FINA Swimming World Cup	Indianapolis, Indiana	November 3, 2022	
100 m individual medley	54.15	h	2022 FINA Swimming World Cup	Indianapolis, Indiana	November 3, 2022	

Legend: h – preliminary heat

=== Short course yards (25 yd pool) ===
Event	Time	Meet	Location	Date	Ref
200 yd freestyle	1:33.68	2021 Winter Junior US National Championships	Greensboro, North Carolina	December 10, 2021	
100 yd backstroke	46.01	2022 Winter Junior US National Championships	Greensboro, North Carolina	December 9, 2022	
200 yd backstroke	1:39.62	2022 Winter Junior US National Championships	Greensboro, North Carolina	December 10, 2022	
200 yd individual medley	1:43.01	2022 Winter Junior US National Championships	Greensboro, North Carolina	December 8, 2022	

== World records ==
=== World junior records ===
==== Long course meters (50 m pool) ====
No.	Event	Time	Meet	Location	Date	Age	Status	Ref
1	4×100 m freestyle	3:15.79	2022 Junior Pan Pacific Championships	Honolulu, Hawaii	August 26, 2022	16 years, 304 days	Current	

==== Short course meters (25 m pool) ====
No.	Event	Time	Meet	Location	Date	Age	Status	Ref
1	4×50 m mixed freestyle	1:31.50	2021 FINA Swimming World Cup	Berlin, Germany	October 2, 2021	15 years, 341 days	Current	

== Awards and honors ==
- The Dapper Dan Club, George Stevenson/Nick Perlozzo Dapper Dan Top Award: 2021, 2022
