= Jamie Perkins =

Australian swimmer (born 2005)

Jamie Perkins OAM
Personal information
- Nationality: Australian
- Born: 19 January 2005 (age 21) Sunshine Coast, Queensland

Sport
- Sport: Swimming
Medal record
Women's swimming
Representing Australia
Olympic Games
Gold medal – first place	2024 Paris	4×200 m freestyle
World Championships (LC)
Gold medal – first place	2025 Singapore	4×200 m freestyle

Jamie Perkins OAM (born 19 January 2005) is an Australian freestyle swimmer and former surf lifesaver. She is an Olympic gold medallist and World champion in swimming, and a multiple-time national surf lifesaving champion. She trains with the St. Peter’s Western Swim Club and previously competed for the Northcliffe Surf Lifesaving Club. She represented Australia in the Women's 400m Freestyle and Women's 4 × 200 m Freestyle Relay at the 2024 Summer Olympics.

== Swimming career ==
=== 2022 Junior Pan Pacific Swimming Championships – Honolulu, Hawaii ===
Silver Medal – 200m Freestyle Silver Medal – 400m Freestyle Silver Medal – 800m Freestyle Silver Medal – 4×100m Freestyle Relay Silver Medal – 4×200m Freestyle Relay

=== 2023 World Junior Championships (Netanya, Israel)2 ===
2023 World Junior Championships (Netanya, Israel) Gold Medal – 400m Freestyle Silver Medal – 4x200m Freestyle Relay

=== 2024 Summer Olympics (Paris) ===
At the 2024 Summer Olympics in Paris, Perkins finished **8th** in the women’s 400 m freestyle final with a time of 4:04.96. She also swam in the heats of the women’s 4 × 200 m freestyle relay—helping Australia qualify fastest for the final—and was awarded a **gold medal** when the team won the relay in Olympic record time.

=== 2025 World Aquatics Championships (Singapore) ===
At the 2025 Worlds in Singapore, Perkins placed **7th** in the women’s 200 m freestyle and **6th** in the 400 m freestyle (4:03.20). She also earned a **gold medal** as part of Australia’s victorious 4 × 200 m freestyle relay team.

== Honours ==
Perkins was awarded the **Medal of the Order of Australia (OAM)** in the 2025 Australia Day Honours for her service to sport as an Olympic gold medallist.
