= Junior Pan Pacific Swimming Championships =

International swimming competition

The Junior Pan Pacific Swimming Championships, a.k.a. Junior Pan PAC’s, is a long course swimming event that features high level 18 under swimmers around the Pacific. The event is held every other even year, and takes place in the non-world championship/junior championship years. The event was last held in 2024, with others postponed or canceled due to the global COVID-19 pandemic; future events have been postponed until after 2022.

== List of championships ==
Edition	Year	Host	Venue	Host country	Dates	Medal table winners	Ref.
1	2005	Maui	Kihei Aquatic Center	United States	6–9 January	United States	
2	2007	Maui	Kihei Aquatic Center	United States	11–14 January	United States	
3	2009	Guam		Guam	8–11 January	United States	
4	2010	Maui	Kihei Aquatic Center	United States	26–30 August	United States	
5	2012	Honolulu	Veterans Memorial Aquatic Center	United States	23–27 August	United States	
6	2014	Maui	Kihei Aquatic Center, Ulua Beach	United States	27–31 August	United States	
7	2016	Maui	Lahaina Aquatic Center	United States	24–27 August	United States	
8	2018	Suva	Damodar Aquatic Centre	Fiji	23–26 August	United States	
9	2022	Honolulu	Veterans Memorial Aquatic Center	United States	24–27 August	United States	
10	2024	Canberra	AIS Aquatic Centre	Australia	21–24 August	United States	
11	2026	Vancouver	UBC Aquatic Centre	Canada	17–20 August	United States	

== Medal table (2012–2026) ==
All-time Junior Pan Pacific Swimming Championships medal table (Updated after 2026 Junior Championships)

Rank	Nation	Gold	Silver	Bronze	Total
1	United States	158	106	75	339
2	Japan	45	50	67	162
3	Australia	31	65	49	145
4	Canada	11	29	36	76
5	China	4	2	2	8
6	South Korea	2	0	2	4
7	Brazil	1	2	4	7
8	New Zealand	0	2	6	8
9	Argentina	0	1	3	4
10	Singapore	0	0	4	4
Totals (10 entries)		252	257	248	757

== Records ==
All records were set in finals, unless noted otherwise.

=== Men ===
Event	Time	Name	Nationality	Date	Location	Ref
50m freestyle	22.20	Paul Powers	United States	31 August 2014	Maui, United States	
100m freestyle	48.23	Flynn Southam	Australia	25 August 2022	Honolulu, United States	
200m freestyle	1:46.04	Luka Mijatovic	United States	17 August 2026	Vancouver, Canada	
400m freestyle	3:43.67	Luka Mijatovic	United States	19 August 2026	Vancouver, Canada	
800m freestyle	7:44.52	Luka Mijatovic	United States	17 August 2026	Vancouver, Canada	
1500m freestyle	14:57.45	Luka Mijatovic	United States	20 August 2026	Vancouver, Canada	
50m backstroke	25.16	Toya Hirata	Japan	18 August 2026	Vancouver, Canada	
100m backstroke	53.27	Daniel Diehl	United States	24 August 2022	Honolulu, United States	
200m backstroke	1:57.00	Hidekazu Takehara	Japan	26 August 2022	Honolulu, United States	
50m breaststroke	27.55	Yusei Imaizumi	Japan	19 August 2026	Vancouver, Canada	
100m breaststroke	59.85	Akihiro Yamaguchi	Japan	24 August 2012	Honolulu, United States	
200m breaststroke	2:08.03	Akihiro Yamaguchi	Japan	27 August 2012	Honolulu, United States	
100m butterfly	51.98	Thomas Heilman	United States	26 August 2022	Honolulu, United States	
200m butterfly	1:55.81	Aaron Shackell	United States	24 August 2022	Honolulu, United States	
200m individual medley	1:59.01	Maximus Williamson	United States	27 August 2022	Honolulu, United States	
400m individual medley	4:09.82	Raito Numata	Japan	18 August 2026	Vancouver, Canada	
4×100m freestyle relay	3:15.79	Thomas Heilman (49.14); Henry McFadden (49.04); Daniel Diehl (48.66); Kaii Winkler (48.95)	United States	26 August 2022	Honolulu, United States	
4×200m freestyle relay	7:13.07	Flynn Southam (1:47.30); Anders McAlpine (1:48.63); Marcus Da Silva (1:49.30); Joshua Staples (1:47.84)	Australia	25 August 2022	Honolulu, United States	
4×100m medley relay	3:35.14	Toya Hirata (54.59); Yusei Imaizumi (59.54); Michika Enomoto (51.47); Eita Kawaura (49.54)	Japan	20 August 2026	Vancouver, Canada	

Legend:
Records not set in finals: h – heat; r – relay 1st leg; rh – relay heat 1st leg; b – B final; so – swim-off

=== Women ===
Event	Time		Name	Nationality	Date	Location	Ref
50m freestyle	24.74		Yolane Kukla	Australia	29 August 2010	Maui, United States	
100m freestyle	53.75	r	Rylee Erisman	United States	23 August 2024	Canberra, Australia	
200m freestyle	1:56.15		Erin Gemmell	United States	24 August 2022	Honolulu, United States	
400m freestyle	4:05.07		Erin Gemmell	United States	26 August 2022	Honolulu, United States	
800m freestyle	8:28.01		Leah Smith	United States	27 August 2012	Honolulu, United States	
1500m freestyle	16:08.09		Lani Pallister	Australia	23 August 2018	Suva, Fiji	
50m backstroke	28.54		Alyssa Sagle	United States	18 August 2026	Vancouver, Canada	
100m backstroke	59.05	r	Leah Shackley	United States	24 August 2024	Canberra, Australia	
200m backstroke	2:08.19		Leah Shackley	United States	23 August 2024	Canberra, Australia	
50m breaststroke	31.58		Maddie Moreth	United States	19 August 2026	Vancouver, Canada	
100m breaststroke	1:07.17		Lilla Ribot De Bresac	Australia	18 August 2026	Vancouver, Canada	
200m breaststroke	2:24.71		Amelie Smith	Australia	20 August 2026	Vancouver, Canada	
100m butterfly	57.99		Audrey Derivaux	United States	23 August 2024	Canberra, Australia	
200m butterfly	2:07.82		Airi Mitsui	Japan	24 August 2022	Honolulu, United States	
200m individual medley	2:10.79		Dagny Knutson	United States	11 January 2009	Guam	
400m individual medley	4:36.79		Mio Narita	Japan	25 August 2022	Honolulu, United States	
4×100m freestyle relay	3:36.49		Rylee Erisman (53.75); Erika Pelaez (53.89); Teagan O'Dell (54.50); Madi Mintenko (54.35)	United States	23 August 2024	Canberra, Australia	
4×200m freestyle relay	7:53.56		Kennedi Dobson (1:57.79); Rylee Erisman (1:59.10); Teagan O'Dell (1:58.19); Madi Mintenko (1:58.48)	United States	22 August 2024	Canberra, Australia	
4×100m medley relay	3:58.88		Leah Shackley (59.05); Elle Scott (1:07.78); Audrey Derivaux (58.37); Rylee Erisman (53.68)	United States	24 August 2024	Canberra, Australia	

Legend:
Records not set in finals: h – heat; r – relay 1st leg; rh – relay heat 1st leg; b – B final; so – swim-off

=== Mixed ===
Event	Time	Name	Nationality	Date	Location	Ref
4×100m medley relay	3:45.21	Leah Shackley (59.26); Campbell McKean (1:00.35); Rowan Cox (51.88); Rylee Erisman (53.72)	United States	21 August 2024	Canberra, Australia	

Legend:
Records not set in finals: h – heat; r – relay 1st leg; rh – relay heat 1st leg; b – B final; so – swim-off
