= Patsy T. Mink Central Oahu Regional Park =

Park in Oahu, Hawaii

Coordinates: 21°24′50″N 158°0′20″W

The Patsy T. Mink Central Oahu Regional Park (CORP) is a 269-acre (1.09 km^{2}) public park operated by the City and County of Honolulu. It held its grand opening on July 21, 2001, and it is located in Waipio, Oahu just off the Kamehameha Highway.

The Central Oahu Regional Park complex currently includes a 20-court tennis center, which opened in 2003; the Veterans Memorial Aquatic Center, four youth baseball diamonds, four regulation size baseball diamonds, a four diamond softball complex, as well as other multipurpose fields, and a 20-lane archery range.

CORP plays host to many different sporting events including swimming, baseball, soccer, football etc. It is also the home field for the Hawaii Pacific University Sea Warrior baseball team, the Chaminade University Silversword softball team as well as being the home of the 2007 Hawaii High School Athletic Association (HHSAA) Softball Tournament.

The Hanwha Eagles (Korea Baseball Organization) uses the baseball field annually during spring training.

The park was renamed after U.S. Representative Patsy Mink in 2007.

Historic Kona storms brought heavy rains and flooding to the park and other parts of the state of Hawaii in March 2026. In response, recovery efforts were initiated by the Hawaii Department of Health to sample the soil in the park and test for contamination. Discussing statewide cleanup progress from the storms, Brian Schatz, the senior United States Senator from Hawaii, urged the federal government to "share the burden of rebuilding."

== Current facilities ==
- 4 Youth Baseball Fields
- 4 Regulation Baseball Fields
- 4 Regulation Softball Fields
- 20 Tennis Courts
- Olympic Size Swimming Pool
- 1 meter and 3 meter Springboards (Diving Boards)
- Multipurpose Fields
- Archery Range

== Planned facilities ==
- Tennis Stadium
- A Basketball Court is rumored
- Equestrian Center

== Notable events ==
- Junior Pan Pacific Swimming Championships: 2012, 2022
