= Swimming at the 2017 Canada Summer Games =

Swimming events at the 2017 Canada Summer Games were held in Winnipeg, Manitoba at the Pan Am Pool from August 7 to August 12. There were 67 events of swimming at these games. The Canada Games are a youth competition, the age restrictions for swimming at the 2017 Canada Summer games restricted competition to males born in 2001 or later and females born in 2002 or later. This effectively made the games a 16 under male competition or 15 and under female competition for able bodied swimmers.

== Results ==
=== Men's ===
==== 50m freestyle ====
Rank	Athlete	Province	Time
1st place, gold medalist(s)	Tyler Wall	British Columbia	23.64
2nd place, silver medalist(s)	Joshua Liendo	Ontario	24.27
3rd place, bronze medalist(s)	Brandon Lacroix	Quebec	24.29
4	Ethan Placek	Ontario	24.41
5	Zachary Godden	Quebec	24.47
6	Daniel Boguski	Manitoba	24.50
7	Thomas Kranjc	British Columbia	24.78
8	Andrew Witwicki	Manitoba	24.97

==== 100m freestyle ====
Rank	Athlete	Province	Time
1st place, gold medalist(s)	Tyler Wall	British Columbia	52.36
2nd place, silver medalist(s)	Cole Pratt	Alberta	52.66
3rd place, bronze medalist(s)	Ethan Placek	Ontario	52.88
4	Owen Huang	Ontario	53.54
5	Charles Wang	Alberta	53.77
6	Brandon Lacroix	Quebec	53.88
7	Thomas Kranjc	British Columbia	54.02
8	Lambert Nadeau	Quebec	55.01

==== 200m freestyle ====
Rank	Athlete	Province	Time
1st place, gold medalist(s)	Cole Pratt	Alberta	1:54.04
2nd place, silver medalist(s)	Owen Huang	Ontario	1:56.22
3rd place, bronze medalist(s)	Raben Dommann	British Columbia	1:56.50
4	Patrick Hussey	Quebec	1:56.91
5	Louis Bertrand	Quebec	1:58.64
6	Ethan Chan	British Columbia	1:59.41
7	Ethan Placek	Ontario	1:59.81
8	Allen Qu	Alberta	2:00.79

==== 400m freestyle ====
Rank	Athlete	Province	Time
1st place, gold medalist(s)	Raben Dommann	British Columbia	4:02.34
2nd place, silver medalist(s)	Patrick Hussey	Quebec	4:05.08
3rd place, bronze medalist(s)	David Quirie	Ontario	4:08.32
4	Drew Edwards	Alberta	4:08.67
5	Louis Bertrand	Quebec	4:08.86
6	Jacob Gallant	New Brunswick	4:14.15
7	Ethan Chan	British Columbia	4:15.15
8	Allen Qu	Ontario	4:21.15

==== 800m freestyle ====
Rank	Athlete	Province	Time
1st place, gold medalist(s)	Raben Dommann	British Columbia	8:26.84
2nd place, silver medalist(s)	Michael McGillivray	Saskatchewan	8:32.85
3rd place, bronze medalist(s)	Louis Bertrand	Quebec	8:34.80
4	David Quirie	Ontario	8:34.87
5	Drew Edwards	Alberta	8:41.30
6	Sehajvir Singh	British Columbia	8:44.73
7	Xavier Pimentel	Quebec	8:47.12
8	Mathieu Cyr	Alberta	8:48.02

==== 1,500m freestyle ====
Rank	Athlete	Province	Time
1st place, gold medalist(s)	Raben Dommann	British Columbia	15:56.99
2nd place, silver medalist(s)	Patrick Hussey	Quebec	16:16.87
3rd place, bronze medalist(s)	Drew Edwards	Alberta	16:21.45
4	David Quirie	Ontario	16:29.67
5	Louis Bertrand	Quebec	16:50.76
6	Mathieu Cyr	Ontario	16:56.62
7	Myles Wheeler	British Columbia	17:04.61
8	Aidan Hull	Ontario	17:07.39

==== 50m backstroke ====
Rank	Athlete	Province	Time
1st place, gold medalist(s)	Graysen Bernard	Ontario	26.70
2nd place, silver medalist(s)	Alex Labrie	Quebec	27.28
3rd place, bronze medalist(s)	Samuel Bourassa	Quebec	27.33
4	Matt Crawford	British Columbia	27.52
5	Tyler Wall	British Columbia	27.62
6	Stephen Hou	Alberta	27.84
7	Brodie Swimmer	Alberta	28.31
8	Brendan Oswald	Ontario	28.50

==== 100m backstroke ====
Rank	Athlete	Province	Time
1st place, gold medalist(s)	Cole Pratt	Alberta	56.82
2nd place, silver medalist(s)	Graysen Bernard	Ontario	56.95
3rd place, bronze medalist(s)	Tyler Wall	British Columbia	58.76
4	Samuel Bourassa	Quebec	59.57
5	Stephen Hou	Alberta	59.74
6	Alex Labrie	Quebec	1:00.09
7	Matt Crawford	British Columbia	1:00.75
8	Brendan Oswald	Ontario	1:01.14

==== 200m backstroke ====
Rank	Athlete	Province	Time
1st place, gold medalist(s)	Graysen Bernard	Ontario	2:05.19
2nd place, silver medalist(s)	Tyler Wall	British Columbia	2:06.68
3rd place, bronze medalist(s)	Cole Pratt	Alberta	2:07.73
4	Benjamin Racine	Quebec	2:09.96
5	Brendan Oswald	Ontario	2:11.35
6	Alex Labrie	Quebec	2:11.70
7	Sehajvir Singh	British Columbia	2:12.31
8	Mitchell Brough	Ontario	2:13.08

=== Women's ===
==== 50m freestyle ====
Rank	Athlete	Province	Time
1st place, gold medalist(s)	Oksana Chaput	Manitoba	26.34
2nd place, silver medalist(s)	Brooklyn Douthwright	New Brunswick	26.71
3rd place, bronze medalist(s)	Genevieve Sasseville	Ontario	26.76
4	Jessica Luo	British Columbia	26.78
5	Liz Ling	Alberta	27.06
6	Judith Simard	Quebec	27.09
7	Kimberly Song	Alberta	27.12
8	Alyson Mercure	Quebec	27.35

==== 100m freestyle ====
Rank	Athlete	Province	Time
1st place, gold medalist(s)	Oksana Chaput	Manitoba	57.47
2nd place, silver medalist(s)	Hanna Henderson	Ontario	57.74
3rd place, bronze medalist(s)	Brooklyn Douthwright	New Brunswick	58.00
3rd place, bronze medalist(s)	Jessica Luo	British Columbia	58.00
5	Genevieve Sasseville	Ontario	59.20
6	Liz Ling	Alberta	59.24
7	Alexandra Turvey	British Columbia	59.30
8	Judith Simard	Quebec	59.96

==== 200m freestyle ====
Rank	Athlete	Province	Time
1st place, gold medalist(s)	Hanna Henderson	Ontario	2:04.50
2nd place, silver medalist(s)	Tori Meklensek	Ontario	2:04.71
3rd place, bronze medalist(s)	Emma O'Croinin	Alberta	2:05.33
4	Jessica Luo	British Columbia	2:05.47
5	Amanda McCallum	British Columbia	2:05.97
6	Oksana Chaput	Manitoba	2:08.17
7	Liz Harper	Alberta	2:08.60
8	Kate Sullivan	Newfoundland and Labrador	2:09.45

==== 400m freestyle ====
Rank	Athlete	Province	Time
1st place, gold medalist(s)	Emma O'Croinin	Alberta	4:22.99
2nd place, silver medalist(s)	Tori Meklensek	Ontario	4:25.63
3rd place, bronze medalist(s)	Zoe Froh	British Columbia	4:26.55
4	Acacia Benn	British Columbia	4:27.93
5	Oksana Chaput	Manitoba	4:30.58
6	Kenna Smallegange	Ontario	4:30.78
7	Brooklyn Douthwright	New Brunswick	4:30.98
8	Madison Archer	Nova Scotia	4:37.23

==== 800m freestyle ====
Rank	Athlete	Province	Time
1st place, gold medalist(s)	Emma O'Croinin	Alberta	8:58.54
2nd place, silver medalist(s)	Sophie Lorette	British Columbia	9:10.54
3rd place, bronze medalist(s)	Zoe Froh	British Columbia	9:13.37
4	Kenna Smallegange	Ontario	9:18.99
5	Erin Shewchuk	Alberta	9:19.49
6	Madison Archer	Ontario	9:21.45
7	Amy Meharg	New Brunswick	9:27.41
8	Kate Sullivan	Newfoundland and Labrador	9:28.70

==== 1,500m freestyle ====
Rank	Athlete	Province	Time
1st place, gold medalist(s)	Emma O'Croinin	Alberta	17:19.31
2nd place, silver medalist(s)	Kenna Smallegange	Ontario	17:38.29
3rd place, bronze medalist(s)	Rebecca Dean	Saskatchewan	17:42.90
4	Sophie Lorette	British Columbia	17:43.47
5	Madison Archer	Nova Scotia	17:45.17
6	Amu Meharg	Ontario	18:04.10
7	Zoe Froh	British Columbia	18:06.02
8	Liz Harper	Alberta	18:06.27

==== 50m backstroke ====
Rank	Athlete	Province	Time
1st place, gold medalist(s)	Hanna Henderson	Ontario	29.57
2nd place, silver medalist(s)	Brooklyn Douthwright	New Brunswick	29.76
3rd place, bronze medalist(s)	Alex Butler	Alberta	30.02
4	Karina Petit	Quebec	30.34
5	Hana Edwards	British Columbia	30.52
6	Megan James	Quebec	30.68
7	Maria Olescu	Alberta	30.69
8	Haley Klenk	British Columbia	30.89

==== 100m backstroke ====
Rank	Athlete	Province	Time
1st place, gold medalist(s)	Hanna Henderson	Ontario	1:03.88
2nd place, silver medalist(s)	Haley Klenk	British Columbia	1:04.60
3rd place, bronze medalist(s)	Alex Butler	Alberta	1:05.17
4	Hana Edwards	British Columbia	1:05.21
5	Maria Olarescu	Alberta	1:05.24
6	Regan Rathwell	Ontario	1:05.49
7	Jacqueline Buche	Quebec	1:06.07
8	Charlotte Dionne	Quebec	1:06.83

==== 200m backstroke ====
Rank	Athlete	Province	Time
1st place, gold medalist(s)	Acacia Benn	British Columbia	2:16.45
2nd place, silver medalist(s)	Hana Edwards	British Columbia	2:18.57
3rd place, bronze medalist(s)	Jacqueline Buche	Quebec	2:18.58
4	Hanna Henderson	Ontario	2:19.11
5	Kenna Smallegange	Ontario	2:22.49
6	Hana Mountford	Nova Scotia	2:22.84
7	Charlotte Dionne	Quebec	2:23.96
8	Emma O'Croinin	Alberta	1:06.83

==== 50m breaststroke ====
Rank	Athlete	Province	Time
1st place, gold medalist(s)	Avery Wiseman	Alberta	33.19
2nd place, silver medalist(s)	Alexa McQuaid	Prince Edward Island	33.48
3rd place, bronze medalist(s)	Pilar McCann	Alberta	33.49
4	Bailey Herbert	British Columbia	33.83
5	Sheigh Gaudette	British Columbia	34.12
6	Emma Myburgh	Ontario	34.15
7	Amaya Sastron-Navarrete	Quebec	34.50
8	Emily Ricketts	Newfoundland and Labrador	35.04

==== 100m breaststroke ====
Rank	Athlete	Province	Time
1st place, gold medalist(s)	Avery Wiseman	Alberta	1:10.60
2nd place, silver medalist(s)	Emma Myburgh	Ontario	1:12.41
3rd place, bronze medalist(s)	Pilar McCann	Alberta	1:12.66
4	Bailey Herbert	British Columbia	1:12.91
5	Serena Muizelaar	Ontario	1:14.47
6	Alexa McQuaid	Prince Edward Island	1:14.97
7	Emily Ricketts	Newfoundland and Labrador	1:15.33
8	Amaya Sastron-Navarrete	Quebec	1:15.51

==== 200m breaststroke ====
Rank	Athlete	Province	Time
1st place, gold medalist(s)	Avery Wiseman	Alberta	2:30.37
2nd place, silver medalist(s)	Bailey Herbert	British Columbia	2:34.54
3rd place, bronze medalist(s)	Emma Spence	Saskatchewan	2:37.66
4	Emma Myburgh	Ontario	2:39.27
5	Serena Muizelaar	Ontario	2:39.66
6	Isabelle Roth	Alberta	2:41.71
7	Amaya Sastron-Navarrete	Quebec	2:44.86
8	Hana Edwards	British Columbia	1:15.51

==== 50m butterfly ====
Rank	Athlete	Province	Time
1st place, gold medalist(s)	Genevieve Sassville	Ontario	27.51
2nd place, silver medalist(s)	Oksana Chaput	Manitoba	27.99
3rd place, bronze medalist(s)	Hanna Henderson	Ontario	28.03
4	Jeanne Dahman	Quebec	28.08
5	Brooklyn Douthwright	New Brunswick	28.35
6	Kyla Nelson	Alberta	28.60
7	Maria Olarescu	Alberta	28.61
8	Alyson Mercure	Quebec	28.92

==== 100m butterfly ====
Rank	Athlete	Province	Time
1st place, gold medalist(s)	Genevieve Sassville	Ontario	1:02.02
2nd place, silver medalist(s)	Jeanne Dahmen	Quebec	1:03.10
3rd place, bronze medalist(s)	Oksana Chaput	Manitoba	1:03.29
4	Lora Willar	Quebec	1:03.55
5	Kyla Nelson	Alberta	1:03.98
6	Lauren Wright	Ontario	1:04.29
7	Bailey Herbert	British Columbia	1:04.61
8	Jessica Luo	British Columbia	1:04.922

==== 200m butterfly ====
Rank	Athlete	Province	Time
1st place, gold medalist(s)	Lora Willar	Quebec	2:16.21
2nd place, silver medalist(s)	Hanna Henderson	Ontario	2:16.51
3rd place, bronze medalist(s)	Sophie Lorette	British Columbia	2:19.20
4	Jeanne Dahmen	Quebec	2:20.40
5	Elyse Carnegie	Ontario	2:20.60
6	Rebecca Dean	Saskatchewan	2:22.85
7	Jessica Luo	British Columbia	2:23.75
8	Isabelle Dearnaley	Nova Scotia	2:28.13

==== 200m medley ====
Rank	Athlete	Province	Time
1st place, gold medalist(s)	Bailey Herbert	British Columbia	2:18.27
2nd place, silver medalist(s)	Acacia Benn	British Columbia	2:21.62
3rd place, bronze medalist(s)	Avery Wiseman	Alberta	2:21.66
4	Mya Falcon	Ontario	2:22.03
5	Regan Rathwell	Ontario	2:24.20
6	Amaya Sastron-Navarrete	Quebec	2:24.89
7	Emily Ricketts	Nova Scotia	2:28.07
8	Jeanne Dahmen	Quebec	2:28.54

==== 400m medley ====
Rank	Athlete	Province	Time
1st place, gold medalist(s)	Bailey Herbert	British Columbia	4:56.47
2nd place, silver medalist(s)	Emma O'Croinin	Alberta	4:59.20
3rd place, bronze medalist(s)	Regan Rathwell	Ontario	4:59.74
4	Avery Wiseman	Alberta	5:03.87
5	Lindsay Puhalski	Ontario	5:05.93
6	Nicolleta Panos	British Columbia	5:12.50
7	Florence Vézina	Quebec	5:15.31
8	Amaya Sastron-Navarrete	Quebec	5:16.36

==== 400m medley ====
Rank	Athlete	Province	Time
1st place, gold medalist(s)	Bailey Herbert	British Columbia	4:56.47
2nd place, silver medalist(s)	Emma O'Croinin	Alberta	4:59.20
3rd place, bronze medalist(s)	Regan Rathwell	Ontario	4:59.74
4	Avery Wiseman	Alberta	5:03.87
5	Lindsay Puhalski	Ontario	5:05.93
6	Nicolleta Panos	British Columbia	5:12.50
7	Florence Vézina	Quebec	5:15.31
8	Amaya Sastron-Navarrete	Quebec	5:16.36

==== 4 × 50m freestyle relay ====
Rank	Athlete	Province	Time
1st place, gold medalist(s)	Mya Falcon; Hanna Henderson; Lindsay Puhalski; Genevieve Sasseville	Ontario	1:47.47
2nd place, silver medalist(s)	Acacia Benn; Jessica Luo; Amanda McCallum; Alexandra Turvey	British Columbia	1:47.52
3rd place, bronze medalist(s)	Cailin McMurray; Alyson Mercure; Karina Petit; Judith Simard	Quebec	1::47.59
4		Alberta	1:49.41
5		Manitoba	1:50.53
6		Saskatchewan	1:52.89
7		Newfoundland and Labrador	1:53.03
8		New Brunswick	1:53.61

==== 4 × 100m freestyle relay ====
Rank	Athlete	Province	Time
1st place, gold medalist(s)	Mya Falcon; Hanna Henderson; Lindsay Puhalski; Genevieve Sasseville	Ontario	3:53.84
2nd place, silver medalist(s)	Acacia Benn; Jessica Luo; Amanda McCallum; Alexandra Turvey	British Columbia	3:54.97
3rd place, bronze medalist(s)	Jeanne Dahmen; Cailin McMurray; Judith Simard; Lora Willar	Quebec	3:56.57
4		Alberta	3:57.53
5		Manitoba	4:03.81
6		Newfoundland and Labrador	4:06.88
7		Saskatchewan	4:07.21
8		Prince Edward Island	4:08.69

==== 4 × 200m freestyle relay ====
Rank	Athlete	Province	Time
1st place, gold medalist(s)	Jessica Luo; Amanda McCallum; Nicolleta Panos; Alexandra Turvey	British Columbia	8:26.40
2nd place, silver medalist(s)	Mya Falcon; Hanna Henderson; Tori Meklensek; Lindsay Puhalski	Ontario	8:26.63
3rd place, bronze medalist(s)	Perrine Bouchard; Cailin McMurray; Amaya Sastron-Navarrete; Lora Willar	Quebec	8:37.70
4		Alberta	8:37.74
5		Newfoundland and Labrador	8:52.47
6		Manitoba	8:53.53
7		Nova Scotia	8:56.04
8		Saskatchewan	8:56.42

==== 4 × 50m medley relay ====
Rank	Athlete	Province	Time
1st place, gold medalist(s)	Alex Butler; Liz Ling; Kyla Nelson; Kimberly Song	Alberta	1:58.48
2nd place, silver medalist(s)	Mya Falcon; Hanna Henderson; Lindsay Puhalski; Genevieve Sasseville	Ontario	1:58.74
3rd place, bronze medalist(s)	Cailin McMurray; Alyson Mercure; Karina Petit; Judith Simard	Quebec	2:00.02
4		British Columbia	2:00.46
5		Manitoba	2:02.07
6		New Brunswick	2:04.88
7		Saskatchewan	2:04.94
8		Prince Edward Island	2:05.08

==== 4 × 100m medley relay ====
Rank	Athlete	Province	Time
1st place, gold medalist(s)	Mya Falcon; Hanna Henderson; Emma Myburgh; Genevieve Sasseville	Ontario	4:18.25
2nd place, silver medalist(s)	Alex Butler; Liz Ling; Kyla Nelson; Avery Wiseman	Alberta	4:18.38
3rd place, bronze medalist(s)	Bailey Herbert; Haley Klenk; Jessica Luo; Amanda McCallum	British Columbia	4:18.67
4		Quebec	4:22.72
5		Manitoba	4:30.01
6		Saskatchewan	4:32.14
7		Nova Scotia	4:33.23
8		New Brunswick	4:33.42

==== 5,000m open water ====
Rank	Athlete	Province	Time
1st place, gold medalist(s)	Emma O'Croinin	Alberta	59:22.48
2nd place, silver medalist(s)	Acacia Benn	British Columbia	1:01:31.37
3rd place, bronze medalist(s)	Brooklyn Douthwright	New Brunswick	1:02:59.13
4	Kate Sullivan	Newfoundland and Labrador	1:03:09.97
5	Liz Harper	Alberta	1:03:12.00
6	Madison Archer	Nova Scotia	1:04:15.79
7	Zoe Froh	British Columbia	1:04:38.18
8	Amy Meharg	Ontario	1:05:05.05

Event	Gold	Silver	Bronze
Swimming - 50m Freestyle Female	Manitoba; Oksana Chaput	New Brunswick; Brooklyn Elizabeth Douthwright	Ontario; Genevieve Sasseville
Swimming - 50m Freestyle Male	British Columbia; Tyler Wall	Ontario; Joshua Liendo	Quebec; Brandon Lacroix
Swimming - 50m Freestyle Para Female	Saskatchewan; Shelby Lynn Newkirk	Ontario; Angela Marina	British Columbia; Arianna Hunsicker
Swimming - 50m Freestyle Para Male	Ontario; Tyson MacDonald	Quebec; Benjamin Désilets	Quebec; Nicolas Plamondon
Swimming - 50m Freestyle Special Olympics Female	Quebec; Myriam Vézina	British Columbia; Mikyla Elaine Carlow	British Columbia; Genny Verge
Swimming - 50m Freestyle Special Olympic Male	British Columbia; Jesse Shade	Alberta; Wesley Wilks	British Columbia; Cameron Chambers
Swimming - 100m Freestyle Female	Manitoba; Oksana Chaput	Ontario; Hanna Henderson	New Brunswick; Brooklyn Elizabeth Douthwright; Jessica Luo
Swimming - 100m Freestyle Male	British Columbia; Tyler Wall	Alberta; Cole Pratt	Ontario; Ethan Placek
Swimming - 100m Freestyle Para Female	Ontario; Angela Marina	Saskatchewan; Shelby Lynn Newkirk	British Columbia; Arianna Hunsicker
Swimming - 100m Freestyle Para Male	Ontario; Tyson MacDonald	Quebec; Benjamin Désilets	Quebec; Nicolas Plamondon
Swimming - 100m Freestyle Special Olympics Female	Manitoba; Quinlan Roberts	British Columbia; Genny Verge	British Columbia; Mikyla Elaine Carlow
Swimming - 100m Freestyle Special Olympics Male	British Columbia; Jesse Shade	Alberta; Wesley Wilks	Ontario; Gaël Shindano
Swimming - 200m Freestyle Female	Ontario; Hanna Henderson	Ontario; Tori Meklensek	Alberta; Emma O'Croinin
Swimming - 200m Freestyle Male	Alberta; Cole Pratt	Ontario; Owen Huang	British Columbia; Raben Commann
Swimming - 400m Freestyle Female	Alberta; Emma O'Croinin	Ontario; Tori Meklensek	British Columbia; Zoe Froh
Swimming - 400m Freestyle Male	British Columbia; Raben Dommann	Quebec; Patrick Hussey	Ontario; David Quirie
Swimming - 800m Freestyle Female	Alberta; Emma O'Croinin	British Columbia; Sophie Grace Lorette	British Columbia; Zoe Froh
Swimming - 800m Freestyle Male	British Columbia; Raben Dommann	Saskatchewan; Michael McGillivray	Quebec; Louis Bertrand
Swimming - 1500m Freestyle Female	Alberta; Emma O'Croinin	Ontario; Kenna Smallegange	Saskatchewan; Rebecca Lou Dean
Swimming - 1500m Freestyle Male	British Columbia; Raben Dommann	Quebec; Patrick Hussey	Alberta; Drew Edwards
Swimming - 200m (S1-5, S14)/400m (S6-13) Freestyle Para Female	Ontario; Angela Marina	Quebec; Miori Hénault	British Columbia; Arianna Hunsicker
Swimming - 200m (S1-5, S14)/400m (S6-13) Freestyle Para Male	Ontario; Tyson MacDonald	Quebec; Benjamin Désilets; Quebec; Nicolas Plamondon	
Swimming - 4x50m Freestyle Relay Female	Ontario	British Columbia	Quebec
Swimming - 4x50m Freestyle Relay Male	Ontario	Quebec	British Columbia
Swimming - 4x100m Freestyle Relay Female	Ontario	British Columbia	Quebec
Swimming - 4x100m Freestyle Relay Male	Ontario	British Columbia	Alberta
Swimming - 4x200m Freestyle Relay Female	British Columbia	Ontario	Quebec
Swimming - 4x200m Freestyle Relay Male	British Columbia	Ontario	Quebec
Swimming - 50m Backstroke Female	Ontario; Hanna Henderson	New Brunswick; Brooklyn Elizabeth Douthwright	Alberta; Alex Butler
Swimming - 50m Backstroke Male	Ontario; Graysen Bernard	Quebec; Alex Labrie	Quebec; Samuel George Bourassa
Swimming - 50m Backstroke Special Olympics Female	Ontario; Desiree Pennells	Manitoba; Quinlan Roberts	Manitoba; Sam Currie
Swimming - 50m Backstroke Special Olympics Male	British Columbia; Jesse Shade	British Columbia; Cameron Chambers	Alberta; Wesley Wilks
Swimming - 100m Backstroke Female	Ontario; Hanna Henderson	British Columbia; Haley Klenk	Alberta; Alex Butler
Swimming - 100m Backstroke Male	Alberta; Cole Pratt	Ontario; Graysen Bernard	British Columbia; Tyler Wall
Swimming - 100m Backstroke Special Olympics Female	British Columbia; Genny Verge	Ontario; Desiree Pennells	Manitoba; Sam Currie
Swimming - 100m Backstroke Special Olympics Male	British Columbia; Jesse Shade	British Columbia; Cameron Chambers	Nova Scotia; Andy Lowe
Swimming - 200m Backstroke Female	British Columbia; Acacia Kathryn Benn	British Columbia; Hana Edwards	Quebec; Jacqueline Rosemary Doray Buche
Swimming - 200m Backstroke Male	Ontario; Graysen Bernard	British Columbia; Tyler Wall	Alberta; Cole Pratt
Swimming - 50m (S1-5) / 100m (S6-14) Backstroke Para Female	Saskatchewan; Shelby Lynn Newkirk	Ontario; Angela Marina	Ontario; Gabby Baird
Swimming - 50m (S1-5) / 100m (S6-14) Backstroke Para Male	Ontario; Tyson MacDonald	Ontario; Matt Cabraja	New Brunswick; Jesse Myles Canney
Swimming - 50m Breaststroke Female	Alberta; Avery Wiseman	Prince Edward Island; Alexa McQuaid	Alberta; Pilar McCann
Swimming - 50m Breaststroke Male	Ontario; Gabe Mastromatteo	Ontario; Owen Huang	British Columbia; Michael Schmidt
Swimming - 100m Breaststroke Female	Alberta; Avery Wiseman	Ontario; Emma Myburgh	Alberta; Pilar McCann
Swimming - 100m Breaststroke Male	Ontario; Owen Huang	Alberta; Finlay Knox	British Columbia; Michael Schmidt
Swimming - 200m Breaststroke Female	Alberta; Avery Wiseman	British Columbia; Bailey Paula Herbert	Saskatchewan; Emma Spence
Swimming - 200m Breaststroke Male	Alberta; Finlay Knox	Ontario; Gabe Mastromatteo	Ontario; Owen Huang
Swimming - 50m (S1-3) / 100m (S4-14) Breaststroke Para Female	Saskatchewan; Shelby Lynn Newkirk	British Columbia; Arianna Hunsicker	Ontario; Angela Marina
Swimming - 50m (S1-3) / 100m (S4-14) Breaststroke Para Male	Ontario; Tyson MacDonald	Alberta; Hidde Geurts	Quebec; Benjamin Désilets
Swimming - 50m Butterfly Female	Ontario; Genevieve Sasseville	Manitoba; Oksana Chaput	Ontario; Hanna Henderson
Swimming - 50m Butterfly Male	Ontario; Joshua Liendo	Quebec; Brandon Lacroix	Alberta; Sterlyng Blair
Swimming - 100m Butterfly Female	Ontario; Genevieve Sasseville	Quebec; Jeanne Dahmen	Manitoba; Oksana Chaput
Swimming - 100m Butterfly Male	Alberta; Cole Pratt	Ontario; Joshua Liendo	Ontario; Graysen Bernard
Swimming - 200m Butterfly Female	Quebec; Lora Willar	Ontario; Hanna Henderson	British Columbia; Sophie Grace Lorette
Swimming - 200m Butterfly Male	Alberta; Cole Pratt	Ontario; Joshua Liendo	Ontario; Ray Yang
Swimming - 50m (S1-7) / 100m (S8-14) Butterfly Para Female	Ontario; Angela Marina	Saskatchewan; Shelby Lynn Newkirk	British Columbia; Aimee Brennan
Swimming - 50m (S1-7) / 100m (S8-14) Butterfly Para Male	Quebec; Nicolas Plamondon	New Brunswick; Jesse Myles Canney	Ontario; Tyson MacDonald
Swimming - 200m Medley Female	British Columbia; Bailey Paul Herbert	British Columbia; Acacia Kathryn Benn	Alberta; Avery Wiseman
Swimming - 200m Medley Male	Alberta; Cole Pratt	Ontario; Graysen Bernard	Alberta; Finlay Knox
Swimming - 400m Medley Female	British Columbia; Bailey Paula Herbert	Alberta; Emma O'Cronin	Ontario; Regan Rathwell
Swimming - 400m Medley Male	Ontario; Graysen Bernard	Alberta; Finlay Knox	New Brunswick; Jacob Gallant
Swimming - 150m (S1-4) / 200m (S5-14) Medley Para Female	Saskatchewan; Shelby Lynn Newkirk	Ontario; Angela Marina	British Columbia; Arianna Hunsicker
Swimming - 150m (S1-4) / 200m (S5-14) Medley Para Male	Ontario; Tyson MacDonald	New Brunswick; Jesse Myles Canney	Quebec; Nicolas Plamondon
Swimming - 4x50m Medley Relay Female	Alberta	Ontario	Quebec
Swimming - 4x50m Medley Relay Male	Ontario	British Columbia	Alberta
Swimming - 4x100m Medley Relay Female	Ontario	Alberta	British Columbia
Swimming - 4x100m Medley Relay Male	Ontario	Alberta	British Columbia
Swimming - 5000m Open Water Female	Alberta; Emma O'Croinin	British Columbia; Acacia Kathryn Benn	New Brunswick; Brooklyn Elizabeth Douthwright
