= Marissa Nichols =

American college athletics administrator and softball player

- Education: University of Nevada, Las Vegas (BS, MEd, PhD)
- Occupation: College athletics administrator
- Employer: University of California, Berkeley
- Known for: Founding director of the Cameron Institute

Marissa Nichols is an American college athletics administrator and former softball player. She is senior associate athletics director and senior woman administrator at the University of California, Berkeley, and the founding director of its Cameron Institute for student-athlete development. As an outfielder at the University of Nevada, Las Vegas (UNLV), she was a first-team All-American in 2005, and she was selected for the UNLV Athletics Hall of Fame in 2026.

== Early life and playing career ==
Nichols is from Diamond Bar, California, and played softball for the UNLV Rebels from 2005 to 2010. As a freshman in 2005 she set UNLV single-season records for hits (89), runs (66), home runs (18), total bases (176) and stolen bases (35), and was named Mountain West Conference Player of the Week six times. She was the conference's Freshman of the Year and a first-team All-American selected by the National Fastpitch Coaches Association. That summer she was named to USA Softball's Elite Team, which won the 2005 Intercontinental Cup in Madrid.

A serious injury in the middle of her sophomore season kept her out for the next two years. She returned in 2009, when UNLV reached the NCAA Tournament, and as a senior in 2010 batted .354 with 12 home runs and 39 runs batted in, earning her third first-team All-Mountain West selection. She was a team captain for five seasons. As of 2026 she ranked third in UNLV history in stolen bases (55) and total bases (406), fourth in home runs (40), and fifth in runs (157) and doubles (47).

Nichols was the Mountain West Conference's nominee for the 2010 NCAA Woman of the Year Award. In 2024 she was named to the Mountain West's 25th Season Team, and in 2026 she was selected for the UNLV Athletics Hall of Fame.

== Education ==
Nichols earned three degrees from UNLV: a Bachelor of Science in human services counseling in 2008, a Master of Education in counselor education in 2010, and a PhD in educational psychology and higher education in 2017. Her dissertation compared academic and athletic performance among Division I FBS student-athletes.

== Career ==
Nichols worked in UNLV's athletics department as coordinator of its Life Skills Program. In May 2017 she became Boston University's first director of leadership and career development in athletics, leading its Bloom Family Leadership Initiative for student-athletes.

In August 2019, Berkeley's athletics department named her the first director of its Cameron Institute, a student-athlete development program founded with a $12.5 million gift from C. Bryan Cameron. She started that September. She also serves as senior associate athletics director and senior woman administrator.

Nichols served on the board of directors of the National Association of Academic and Student-Athlete Development Professionals (N4A) for 2023–24. She co-authored the association's first white paper on student-athlete development in 2022, and that year N4A gave her its Region V Professional Excellence Award. In 2025 she received the Berkeley Staff Assembly's Excellence in Management Award.

Nichols spoke at TEDxFolsom in August 2025. Her talk, "3 ways to help college athletes win", was published on the TEDx Talks YouTube channel in July 2026.

== Selected publications ==
- Nichols, Marissa K.; Lough, Nancy L.; Corkill, Alice J. (2019). "Exploring success: Variations in Division I student-athlete academic and athletic performance". Journal of Issues in Intercollegiate Athletics. 12: 314–342.
- Nichols, Marissa (2017). An Examination of Differences in Division I FBS Student-Athlete Academic and Athletic Performance (PhD dissertation). University of Nevada, Las Vegas. doi:10.34917/10986097.
