= Walter Byers Scholarship =

The Walter Byers Scholar (also known as Walter Byers Scholarship, and Walter Byers Postgraduate Scholarship) program is a scholarship program that recognizes the top male and female student-athlete in NCAA sports and that is awarded annually by the National Collegiate Athletic Association (NCAA). The NCAA's considers it its highest academic award. The NCAA initiated the Walter Byers Scholarship program in 1988 in recognition of the service of Walter Byers. The award is a postgraduate scholarship program designed to encourage excellence in academic performance by student-athletes. The recipients each year are the one male and one female student-athlete who has combined the best elements of mind and body to achieve national distinction for their achievements, and who promises to be a future leader in their chosen field of career service. Winners receive scholarships for postgraduate study.

== Details ==
As of 2011, the stipend for each Byers Scholarship was $24,000 for an academic year. The scholarship amount is adjusted for the cost of living. The grant may be renewed for a second year based on academic progress. Financial need is not a factor in the granting of these scholarships. United States citizenship is not required to satisfy eligibility requirements. Awards from other sources will not disqualify an applicant, except that an awardee may not use more than one NCAA postgraduate scholarship. The Walter Byers Postgraduate Scholarship Program is separate and distinct from the NCAA Postgraduate Scholarship Program, which provides annual awards with smaller stipends.

The five-person Walter Byers Scholarship Committee, established by the NCAA membership and appointed by the NCAA Divisions I, II and III Management Councils, administers the program. The committee membership is required to include at least one man and one woman, at least one member from each division and subdivision of Division I, and one member each from Division II and Division III.

Among the most recognized for post-athletic career accomplishments are Randal Pinkett and Rob Pelinka. Of the winners the one most notable for having gone professional in their sport is National Football League veteran Rob Zatechka, who later went on to medical school.

Some winners have won other notable awards. The following lists dual winners of certain awards:

- Rhodes Scholar - Henderson, Thigpen, Pinkett
- Top VIII Award - Black, Roethlisberger, Busbee, Carney
- NCAA Woman of the Year Award - Black, Bersagel

== Winners ==
The historical winners are as follows:

Year	Male			Female		
Year	Athlete	Sport	School	Athlete	Sport	School
1989	Richard Hall	Basketball	Ball State University	Regina Cavanagh	Track and field	Rice University
1990	Dean Smith	Basketball	University of Maine	Linda Popovich	Volleyball	Bowling Green State University
1991	J. David Brown	Track and field Cross country	University of Iowa	Marie Roethlisberger	Gymnastics	University of Minnesota
1992	David Honea	Cross country	North Carolina State University	Sigall Kassutto	Gymnastics	University of California, Berkeley
1993	Rob Pelinka	Basketball	University of Michigan	Sheryl Klemme	Basketball	Saint Joseph's College (Indiana)
1994	Randal Pinkett	Track and field	Rutgers University	Christa Gannon	Basketball	University of California, Santa Barbara
1995	Robert Zatechka	Football	University of Nebraska–Lincoln	Carla Ainsworth	Swimming	Kenyon College
1996	Christopher Palmer	Football	St. John's University (Minnesota)	Tracey Holmes	Golf	University of Kentucky
1997	Scott Keane	Track and field	University of Cincinnati	Marya Morusiewicz	Volleyball	Barry University
1998	Robert "Brad" Gray	Football	Massachusetts Institute of Technology	Marsha Harris	Basketball	New York University
1999	Samuel "Calvin" Thigpen	Track and field Cross country	University of Mississippi	Gladys Ganiel	Track and field Cross country	Providence College
2000	Matthew Busbee	Swimming	Auburn University	Anna Hallbergson	Tennis	Barry University
2001	Bradley Henderson	Basketball	University of Chicago	Kimberly Black	Swimming	University of Georgia
2002	Kyle Eash	Football; Track and field	Illinois Wesleyan University	Claudia Veritas	Lacrosse	Wellesley College
2003	McLain "Mac" Schneider	Football	University of North Dakota	Natalie Halbach	Gymnastics	University of North Carolina at Chapel Hill
2004	Joaquin Zalacain	Tennis	University of Puerto Rico, Rio Piedras	Corrin Drakulich	Track and field	University of Georgia
2005	Matthew Gunn	Track and field Cross country	University of Arkansas	Sarah Dance	Swimming	Truman State University
2006	Bryan Norrington	Track and field	Colorado College	Annie Bersagel	Track and field Cross country	Wake Forest University
2007	Dane Todd	Football	University of Nebraska–Lincoln	Katie Kingsbury	Tennis	Washington and Lee University
2008	Dylan Carney	Gymnastics	Stanford University	Brenna Burns	Track and field Cross country	Davidson College
2009	Craig Sheedy	Diving	University of Arizona	Amy Massey	Soccer	University of Southern California
2010	Joshua Mahoney	Football	University of Northern Iowa	Katherine Theisen	Track and field Cross country	University of St. Thomas
2011	J. David Gatz	Swimming	Ohio Wesleyan University	Jessica Pixlar	Track and field Cross country	Seattle Pacific University
2012	Miles Batty	Track and field Cross Country	Brigham Young University	Kelsey Ward	Swimming	Drury University
2013	Matt Horn	Soccer	Winthrop University	Alexa Duling	Track and field	University of South Dakota
2014	Kyle Boden	Football	Emory and Henry College	Karenee Demery	Soccer	California State University, Stanislaus
2015	Tofey James "T.J." Leon IV	Swimming	Auburn University	Lucinda Kauffman	Field Hockey	Shippensburg University of Pennsylvania
2016	Mitchell Black	Track and Field	Tufts University	Katherine Riojas	Soccer	University of Tulsa
2017	George Bugarinovic	Basketball	Johns Hopkins University	Nandini Mehta	Soccer	Northwestern University
2018	Michael Seward	Hockey	Harvard University	Jennifer Carmichael	Track and Field	University of Oklahoma
2019	Derek Soled	Fencing	Yale University	Rachael Acker	Swimming	University of California, Berkeley
2020	Xavier Gonzalez	Tennis	Harvard University	Kayla Leland	Cross Country; Basketball; Track and Field	Whitworth University
2021	Ivo Cerda	Soccer	University of Michigan	Asia Seidt	Swimming	University of Kentucky
2022	Gavin Turner	Fencing	Pennsylvania State University	Mackenzie Niness	Swimming	Villanova University
2023	Dylan Kim	Fencing	Princeton University	Logan Eggleston	Volleyball	University of Texas
2024	Ian Cleary	Baseball	Oakland University	Alexandra Turvey	Swimming	Pomona College
2025	Mason Nichols	Baseball	University of Mississippi	Katelin Isakoff	Swimming	Tufts University
2026	Aidan Crawford	Soccer	Loyola University Chicago	Skylar Ciccolini	Track and Field	University of Missouri

== See also ==
- Academic All-America
- List of Academic All-America Team Members of the Year
- Elite 89 Award
- NCAA Sportsmanship Award (student-athletes who have demonstrated one or more of the ideals of sportsmanship)
- Today's Top VIII Award (NCAA) (outstanding senior student-athletes)
- NCAA Woman of the Year Award (senior female student-athlete)
- Silver Anniversary Awards (NCAA) (former student-athletes)
