= NCAA Sportsmanship Award =

- Description: Honoring student-athletes who demonstrate fairness, civility, and honesty
- Country: United States
- Presented by: National Collegiate Athletic Association (NCAA)
- Website: www.ncaa.org

The NCAA Sportsmanship Award is given to men and women in National Collegiate Athletics Association sports who have demonstrated one or more of the ideals of sportsmanship, including fairness, civility, honesty, respect and responsibility. It was created and first awarded in 1999.

== List of recipients ==
- 1999: Allison Beighton, Randolph-Macon College, basketball; and Jarrett Erwin, Rice University, football
- 2000: George Audu, Pennsylvania State College, track and field; Safiya Ingram, University of Alabama Tuscaloosa, track and field; and Lindsay Morton, Ferrum College, tennis
- 2001:
- 2002:
- 2003:
- 2004: Chanda Gunn, Northeastern University, ice hockey; Danny Gathings, High Point University, basketball; and the football team at Mesa State College
- 2005: Philip B. Barr, Bates College, swimming; and Lauren Clary, Xavier University, tennis
- 2006: Mike Rose, Slippery Rock University, decathlon; and Sarah Dawn Schettle, University of Wisconsin–Oshkosh, track and field and swimming
- 2007: Brian Hung, University of Michigan, tennis; and the women's soccer team at Framingham State College
- 2008: Mallory Holtman, Central Washington University, softball; Einar Often, University of Alaska Fairbanks, Nordic skiing; and the men's baseball team at St. John Fisher College
- 2009: Aleksandra "Ola" Mackiewicz, Brown University, Fencing; Isaac Rothenbaum, Carthage College, Swimming; Anthony DiCarlo, Anderson University, Wrestling
- 2010:
- 2011: Courtney Berger, Nova Southeastern University, Rowing
- 2012:
- 2013:
- 2014: Jaylee Brown, Northern Michigan University, cross country/track and field; Chari Hawkins, Utah State University, track and field; and the football team at Harding University
- 2015: Julius Ryan Bautista "D' Mamangan" Guagua National colleges, Fencing; Isaac Rothenbaum, Carthage College, Swimming; Anthony DiCarlo, Anderson University, Wrestling
- 2016:
- 2017:

== See also ==
- Today's Top 10 Award (NCAA) (outstanding senior student-athletes)
- NCAA Woman of the Year Award (senior female student-athlete)
- Walter Byers Scholarship (NCAA) (top male and female scholar-athletes)
- Silver Anniversary Awards (NCAA) (former student-athletes)
- Lowe's Senior CLASS Award
- Best Female College Athlete ESPY Award
- Best Male College Athlete ESPY Award
- Athlete of the Year
