= Danny Gathings =

American basketball player

Personal information
- Born: December 11, 1980 (age 45) Winston-Salem, North Carolina, U.S.
- Listed height: 6 ft 6 in (1.98 m)
- Listed weight: 205 lb (93 kg)

Career information
- High school: Winston-Salem Prep (Winston-Salem, North Carolina)
- College: Virginia Tech (2000–2001); High Point (2002–2005)
- NBA draft: 2005: undrafted
- Playing career: 2005–2009
- Position: Forward

Career history
- 2005–2006: Aura Basket Turku
- 2006–2007: Sallen Basket
- 2007–2009: Uppsala Basket
- 2009: Korihait

Career highlights
- Big South Player of the Year (2004); 2× First-team All-Big South (2003, 2004); AP Honorable Mention All-American (2004); NCAA Sportsmanship Award (2004)

Danny Gathings (born December 11, 1980) is an American former professional basketball player. He spent time playing in Finland and Sweden after completing his collegiate career in the United States at High Point University. In 2003–04, he was the Big South Conference's player of the year.

== College ==
Gathings starred at Winston-Salem Preparatory Academy in Winston-Salem, North Carolina before starting his collegiate career at Virginia Tech in 2000–01. In his freshman season, Gathings played in 20 games and averaged 7.0 points, 3.2 rebounds and 1.0 steals per contest. He decided to transfer at the end of the year, however, and chose High Point University as his school of choice.

Due to NCAA transfer by-laws, Gathings redshirted his true sophomore year in 2001–02. He made an immediate impact when he became eligible in 2002–03: he averaged 18.7 points, 7.6 rebounds and 2.2 steals per game. Despite the Panthers finishing with a 7–20 overall record, Gathings was able to lead the Big South in both points and rebounds per game.

The next season, his scoring (15.8) and steals (1.6) dipped, but his rebounding (8.0) increased. High Point had a 12-game turnaround and finished with a 19–11 record and Gathings was named the conference's player of the year. That season, he recorded 12 double-doubles, scored his 1,000th career point, and made two game-winning shots as time expired. Gathings led the Panthers to the championship game of the Big South tournament where they fell to Liberty, 89–44. He was named the tournament's MVP despite being outplayed by Liberty freshman Larry Blair. Without being told to do so or it having been suggested to him, Gathings voluntarily handed the MVP trophy to Blair, the player he thought was most deserving, in a ceremony at Liberty's campus shortly thereafter. The NCAA named Gathings their 2003–04 Co-Sportsman of the Year for this benevolent act, which also made him the first athlete from High Point to be presented an NCAA-sponsored award.

In Gathings' senior season, defenses were more focused on him and his numbers suffered. He averaged 12.6 points, 6.6 rebounds, and 1.3 steals per game, and the Panthers finished with a 13–18 overall record. Unlike his previous two seasons, he did not earn any All-Big South honors. Gathings concluded his collegiate career with net totals of 1,400 points, 662 rebounds, and 155 steals in 101 games played.

== Professional ==
Gathings played several years of professional basketball following college. In Finland's Korisliiga, he played for Aura Basket Turku in 2005–06. The next three seasons were spent in Sweden's Basketligan playing for Sallen Basket and Uppsala Basket, respectively, before finishing his career off in Finland once again with Korihait.
