= Aaron Goodwin =

Sports agent representing NBA players

Aaron Goodwin is a sports agent who represents players in the National Basketball Association and Women's National Basketball Association. He was the initial agent for LeBron James, and negotiated endorsement deals paying James over $135 million, including a $90 million deal with Nike. James later left Goodwin in favor of agent Leon Rose. He was initially Kevin Durant's agent, but Durant moved to Rob Pelinka. Goodwin's other clients have included Dwight Howard, Chris Webber, Damian Lillard, Gary Payton, Jason Kidd, Shareef Abdur-Rahim, Vin Baker, DeMar DeRozan, Damon Stoudamire, Todd MacCulloch, Nate Robinson, and Candace Parker. In 2004, he was ranked eighth on Sports Illustrated's list of the Most Influential Minorities in Sports.

== Personal life ==
Goodwin is from Oakland, California. His twin brother, Eric, is also a sports agent.
