= Winston-Salem Preparatory Academy =

American public school in North Carolina

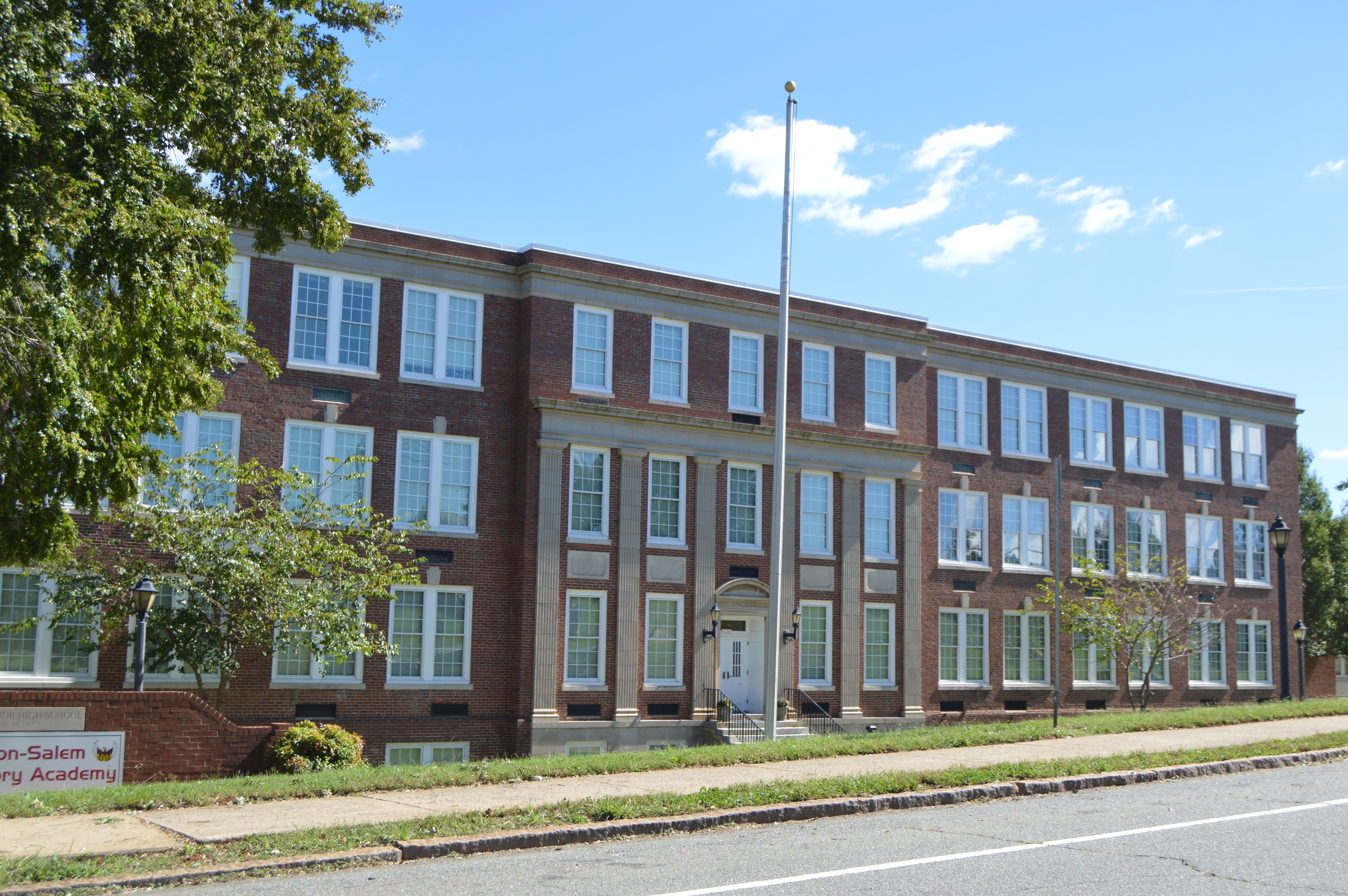

Location
- 1215 N. Cameron Ave. Winston-Salem, North Carolina 27101; United States; 36°06′39″N 80°13′20″W

Information
- School type: Middle and high school
- Motto: "Our New Beginning"
- Established: 2004 (22 years ago)
- School district: Winston-Salem/Forsyth County Schools
- Superintendent: Tricia McManus
- CEEB code: 344466
- Principal: Keisha Gabriel
- Staff: 31.34 (FTE)
- Grades: 6–12
- Enrollment: 337 (2017–18)
- Student to teacher ratio: 10.75
- Language: English
- Campus type: Suburban
- Colors: Red and black
- Athletics: NCHSAA 1A
- Athletics conference: Greater Triad 1A/2A
- Mascot: Phoenix
- Website: wsfcs.k12.nc.us/wsprep

Winston-Salem Preparatory Academy (WSPA) is a public school located in Forsyth County, in Winston-Salem, North Carolina. Its building location is at the former site of Atkins High School.

== Overview ==
=== Small class sizes ===
There are approximately 85 students per middle school grade and 100 students per high school grade. The average class size is around 20 students per class.

=== Admission requirements ===
WSPA students are accepted through a process that includes a written essay, an interview, commitment of parent support, a written agreement, promise of volunteer in support of school activities, and a follow-up by letter indicating acceptance to the WSPA Magnet Program.

== Athletics ==
Winston-Salem Prp is a member of the North Carolina High School Athletic Association (NCHSAA) and are classified as a 1A school. The school is a part of the Greater Triad 1A/2A Conference.

=== State Championships ===
Winston-Salem Prep has won the following NCHSAA team state championships:

- Men's Basketball: 2008 (1A), 2012 (1A), 2013 (1A), 2014 (1A), 2018 (1A), 2020 co-champs (1A)
- Women's Basketball: 2015 (1A), 2016 (1A)
- Women's Outdoor Track & Field: 2008 (1A), 2009 (1A), 2015 (1A)

== Notable alumni ==
- Zack Austin, professional basketball player
- Danny Gathings, professional basketball player
- Reggie Johnson, professional basketball player
