= Today's Top 10 Award =

The Today's Top 10 Award is given each year by the National Collegiate Athletic Association (NCAA) to honor ten former outstanding senior student-athletes. The award was previously known by three different names, each reflecting the number of recipients:

- Today's Top V Award or the Top Five Award (1973–1985)
- Today's Top VI Award (1986–1994)
- Today's Top VIII Award (1995–2013)

Below is a list of the recipients of the Today's Top 10 Award given each year by the National Collegiate Athletic Association (NCAA) since its inception in 1973. The names of these exceptional individuals are engraved in the Hall of Honor at the NCAA Hall of Champions on the NCAA Headquarters in Indianapolis, Indiana. Recognition in the NCAA Hall of Honor ensures these athletes are remembered. They have reached the pinnacle of national athletic and academic success through their accomplishments. As of 2020, there are more than 480,000 NCAA student-athletes annually. This award recognizes the nation's best former student-athletes from every NCAA sport and division. Each year, the recipients are honored at the NCAA Convention.

Winter/spring sports considered include baseball, basketball, women's beach volleyball, fencing, golf, gymnastics, ice hockey, lacrosse, rifle, rowing, skiing, softball, swimming and diving, tennis, indoor and outdoor track and field, men's volleyball, women's water polo and wrestling. Fall sports considered include cross country, field hockey, football, soccer, women's indoor volleyball and men's water polo.

== List of recipients ==
This is a list of the recipients of the Today's Top 10 Award given each year by the National Collegiate Athletic Association (NCAA) since its inception in 1973. The names of these exceptional individuals are engraved in the Hall of Honor at the NCAA Hall of Champions on the NCAA Headquarters in Indianapolis, Indiana. Recognition in the NCAA Hall of Honor ensures these athletes are remembered. They have reached the pinnacle of national athletic and academic success through their accomplishments. As of 2020, there are more than 480,000 NCAA student-athletes annually. This award recognizes the nation's best former student-athletes from every NCAA sport and division. Each year, the recipients are honored at the NCAA Convention.

=== 2026 recipients ===
Recipient	School	Sport
Ella Brissett	Claremont-Mudd-Scripps	Tennis
Mia Levy	Yale University	Rowing
Brayden Long	Slippery Rock University	Football
Aino Martikainen	Franklin Pierce University	Soccer
Micaylon Moore	Nebraska	Indoor Track and Field, Outdoor Track and Field
Matt Wrather	John Carroll University	Football

=== 2025 recipients ===
Recipient	School	Sport
Rémi Drolet	Harvard University	Skiing
Riley Felts	University of North Carolina at Charlotte	Indoor Track and Field, Outdoor Track and Field
Owen Grover	Wartburg College	Football
Lindsay Looney	Arizona State University	Swimming and Diving
Kiki Milloy	University of Tennessee	Softball
Marc Anthony Minichello	University of Georgia	Cross Country, Outdoor Track and Field
Rome Odunze	University of Washington	Football
Cassie Pruitt	Auburn University	Gymnastics
Shelby Robb	Metropolitan State University of Denver	Softball
Daisy Woodring	Texas Woman's University	Gymnastics

=== 2024 recipients ===
Recipient	School	Sport
Kobe Brown	University of Missouri	Basketball
Callie Dickinson	University of Georgia	Swimming and Diving
Aria Fischer	Stanford University	Water Polo
Divonne Franklin	Pennsylvania Western University, California	Indoor Track and Field, Outdoor Track and Field
Noah Gulden	Lipscomb University	Soccer
Sydney Packard	Worcester Polytechnic Institute	Cross Country, Indoor Track and Field, Outdoor Track and Field
Ashley Rogers Mills	University of Tennessee	Softball
Trinity Thomas	University of Florida	Gymnastics
Anika Washburn	Case Western Reserve University	Soccer
Turner Washington	Arizona State University	Indoor Track and Field, Outdoor Track and Field

=== 2023 recipients ===
Recipient	School	Sport
Sylvie Binder	Columbia University	Fencing
Jaeda Daniel	North Carolina State University	Tennis
Brooke Forde	Stanford University	Swimming and Diving
Naomi Girma	Stanford University	Soccer
Gianna Glatz	Rutgers University	Field Hockey
Blaine Hawkins	Central College	Football
Jessica Meakim	West Chester University	Gymnastics
Jack Mulvihill	St. John Fisher University	Lacrosse
Juan Ortiz Couder	Embry–Riddle Aeronautical University, Daytona Beach	Tennis
Abby Steiner	University of Kentucky	Indoor Track and Field, Outdoor Track and Field

=== 2022 recipients ===
Recipient	School	Sport
Estela Perez-Somarriba	University of Miami	Tennis
Anna Cockrell	University of Southern California	Indoor Track and Field, Outdoor Track and Field
Kendall Cornick	Augustana University	Softball
Stefani Deschner	University of Notre Dame	Fencing
Lauren Huebner	Saginaw Valley State University	Indoor Track and Field, Outdoor Track and Field
Mac Jones	University of Alabama	Football
Eka Jose	Washington University in St. Louis	Indoor Track and Field, Outdoor Track and Field
Danny Logan	University of Denver	Lacrosse
Jack Mingjie Lin	Columbia University	Tennis
Kendall Sosa	Illinois Wesleyan University	Basketball

=== 2021 recipients ===
Recipient	School	Sport
Nia Akins	University of Pennsylvania	Cross Country, Indoor Track and Field, Outdoor Track and Field
Bernardo Amaral Neves	Washington University in St. Louis	Tennis
Brittny Ellis	University of Miami	Indoor Track and Field, Outdoor Track and Field
Alison Gibson	University of Texas at Austin	Swimming, Diving
Eoin Gronningsater	Duke University	Fencing
Deshawn Jones	Missouri University of Science and Technology	Football
Lily Justine	University of California, Los Angeles	Beach Volleyball
Kayla Leland	Whitworth University	Cross Country, Indoor Track and Field, Outdoor Track and Field, Basketball
Asia Seidt	University of Kentucky	Swimming, Diving
Juah Toe	West Chester University	Rugby

=== 2020 recipients ===
Recipient	School	Sport
Jimmy Bendeck	Baylor University	Tennis
Iman Blow	Columbia University	Fencing
Virginia Elena Carta	Duke University	Golf
Kaitlin Hatch	West Chester University	Field hockey
Kirby Hora	Augustana University	Football
Cassandra Laios	Case Western Reserve University	Indoor Track and Field, Outdoor Track and Field
Hannah Orbach-Mandel	Kenyon College	Swimming
Kristin Quah	Vanderbilt University	Bowling
Anton Stephenson	Nebraska	Gymnastics
Virginia Thrasher	West Virginia University	Rifle

=== 2019 recipients ===
Recipient	School	Sport
Ama Biney	Worcester Polytechnic Institute	Basketball, Softball
Andrea Bryson	St. Cloud State University	Swimming
Jevon Carter	West Virginia University	Basketball
Lucas Kaliszak	University of Alabama	Swimming
Alison Lindsay	Washington University in St. Louis	Cross Country, Indoor Track and Field, Outdoor Track and Field
Alex McMurtry	University of Florida	Gymnastics
Keturah Orji	University of Georgia	Track and field
Ben Reeves	Yale University	Lacrosse
Kyle Snyder	Ohio State University	Wrestling
Julia Wilson	Kenyon College	Swimming

=== 2018 recipients ===
Recipient	School	Sport
Kasey Cooper	Auburn University	Softball
Marie Coors	Saint Leo University	Golf
Elizabeth Crist	Washington University in St. Louis	Soccer
Danielle Galyer	University of Kentucky	Swimming, Diving
Sarah Gibson	Texas A&M University, College Station	Swimming, Diving
Riley Hanson	Concordia University, St. Paul	Volleyball
Thai-Son Kwiatkowski	University of Virginia	Tennis
Amy Regan	Stevens Institute of Technology	Track and field
Deko Ricketts	Washington University in St. Louis	Track and field
Maggie Steffens	Stanford University	Water Polo

=== 2017 recipients ===
Recipient	School	Sport
Logan Andryk	Milwaukee School of Engineering	Soccer
Elizabeth Aronoff	Emory University	Swimming, Diving
Kendall Coyne	Northeastern University	Ice hockey
Taylor Ellis-Watson	University of Arkansas, Fayetteville	Track and field
Nicole Hensley	Lindenwood University	Ice hockey
C.J. Krimbill	Case Western Reserve University	Tennis
Haylie McCleney	University of Alabama	Softball
Tiffany Mitchell	University of South Carolina, Columbia	Basketball
Dak Prescott	Mississippi State University	Football
Jason Vander Laan	Ferris State University	Football

=== 2016 recipients ===
Recipient	School	Sport
Anastasia Bogdanovski	Johns Hopkins	Swimming, Diving
Matt Brown	Penn State	Wrestling
Lucy Cheadle	Washington (MO)	Cross-country, track and field
John Coleman	Clarkson	Baseball, basketball
Georgia Dabritz	Utah	Gymnastics
Kristin Day	Clarion	Swimming, Diving
Ruben Gimenez	Bridgeport	Swimming, Diving
Kendra Harrison	Kentucky	Track and field
Colleen Quigley	Florida State	Cross-country, track and field
Zach Zenner	South Dakota State	Football

=== 2015 recipients ===
Recipient	School	Sport
Lauren Battista	Bentley University	Basketball
Abbey D'Agostino	Dartmouth College	Cross Country, Track and field
Joe Fletcher	Loyola University	Lacrosse
Kristen Hixon	Grand Valley State University	Track and field
Gabe Ikard	University of Oklahoma	Football
Kim Jacob	University of Alabama	Gymnastics
Megan Light	Emory University	Softball
Nicole Michmerhuizen	Calvin College	Cross Country, Track and field
Mark Thomas	Livingstone College	Basketball
Shannon Vreeland	University of Georgia	Swimming

=== 2014 recipients ===
Recipient	School	Sport
Brigetta Barrett	Arizona	Track and field
Amber Brooks	North Carolina	Soccer
Raven Chavanne	Tennessee	Softball
Elena Delle Donne	Delaware	Basketball, volleyball
Ellie Duffy	Concordia (St. Paul)	Volleyball
Barrett Jones	Alabama	Football
Jocelyne Lamoureux	North Dakota	Ice hockey
Tim Nelson	Wisconsin–Stout	Cross-country, track and field
Kayla Shull	Clarion	Swimming, Diving
Mary Weatherholt	Nebraska	Tennis

== Recipients ==
Recipients of the Top 10 Award include many notable athletes in the United States and include John Elway, Steve Young, Peyton Manning, Eli Manning, Doug Flutie, Tiki Barber, Cheryl Miller, Drew Brees, Kendall Coyne and Elena Delle Donne.

== See also ==
- List of recipients of Today's Top 10 Award
- Senior CLASS Award (top student-athletes—in 10 sports—based on community, classroom, character, and competition)
- NCAA Sportsmanship Award (student-athletes who have demonstrated one or more of the ideals of sportsmanship)
- NCAA Woman of the Year Award (senior female student-athlete)
- Walter Byers Scholarship (NCAA) (top male and female scholar-athletes)
- Silver Anniversary Awards (former student-athletes)
