= Christa Gannon =

American basketball player

Christa M. Gannon
- Education: University of California, Santa Barbara (B.S., honors); Northwestern University School of Law (J.D., transferred); Stanford Law School (J.D., 1997)
- Children: 2

Christa M. Gannon is an American nonprofit executive and juvenile-justice advocate best known for founding Fresh Lifelines for Youth (FLY), a California organisation that combines legal education, mentorship and policy reform to reduce youth incarceration. A former basketball player at the University of California, Santa Barbara, and a graduate of Stanford Law School, Gannon has drawn on athletic discipline and legal training in more than two decades of community activism.

== Early life and education ==
In 1994, Gannon received the Walter Byers Award, the National Collegiate Athletic Association's highest academic honor, in recognition of being the nation's top female scholar-athlete. She graduated with honors from the University of California at Santa Barbara. Following graduation, she went to law school, first at Northwestern University School of Law before transferring to Stanford Law School where she graduated in 1997.

== Career ==
After law school she won a George Soros fellowship for postgraduate study.

In 2010 she was elected an Ashoka Fellow for system-level innovation in juvenile justice.
