= Zack Austin =

American basketball player (born 2001)

No. 55 – Cleveland Cavaliers
- Position: Shooting guard
- League: NBA

Personal information
- Born: August 11, 2001 (age 25) Winston-Salem, North Carolina, U.S.
- Listed height: 6 ft 5 in (1.96 m)
- Listed weight: 215 lb (98 kg)

Career information
- High school: Winston-Salem Prep (Winston-Salem, North Carolina); Moravian Prep (Hudson, North Carolina)
- College: High Point (2021–2023); Pittsburgh (2023–2025)
- NBA draft: 2025: undrafted
- Playing career: 2025–present

Career history
- 2025–2026: Oklahoma City Blue
- 2026–present: Cleveland Cavaliers
- 2026–present: →Cleveland Charge
- Stats at NBA.com
- Stats at Basketball Reference

Zack Austin (born August 11, 2001) is an American professional basketball player for the Cleveland Cavaliers of the National Basketball Association (NBA), on a two-way contract with the Cleveland Charge of the NBA G League. He played college basketball for the High Point Panthers and Pittsburgh Panthers.

== High school career ==
Austin played basketball for one season at Moravian Preparatory School in Hudson, North Carolina after graduating from Winston-Salem Preparatory Academy. He was lightly recruited and committed to play college basketball at High Point, after considering an offer from Appalachian State.

== College career ==
=== High Point ===
Austin began his college basketball career with the High Point Panthers as a redshirt freshman. In his first year playing for High Point, Austin averaged 14.4 points and 2.2 blocks per game while leading the Big South in rebounds per game, with eight. Austin was named Big South Freshman of the Week a record 8 times and was named Big South Co-Freshman of the Year along with USC Upstate guard Jordan Gainey.

In his second season, Austin again averaged over 14 points and 2 blocks per game, and was an honorable mention for the Big South All-Conference team. After the season, Austin transferred to Pitt.

=== Pittsburgh ===
In his first season at Pitt, Austin averaged 6.5 points and 1.3 blocks per game. He scored his 1,000th career point in January 2024, playing against Louisville.

In his final college season, Austin averaged 9.2 points per game and led the ACC in blocks per game, with 1.6. He was named to the All-ACC Defensive Team.

== Professional career ==
Austin was not drafted in the 2025 NBA draft, but signed an Exhibit 10 contract with the Oklahoma City Thunder on June 27, 2025. He was waived prior to the start of the regular season on October 18, and joined their G League affiliate the Oklahoma City Blue. On October 15, 2026, Austin was acquired by the Cleveland Charge.
