= Sarah Dance =

American swimmer

Sport
- Sport: Swimming
- College team: Truman Bulldogs

Sarah Dance was the female winner of the National Collegiate Athletic Association's highest academic honor, the 2005 Walter Byers Award, in recognition of being the nation's top female scholar-athlete. She was a 28-time All-American swimmer who helped lead Truman State University to four national championships.

== Early life and education ==
Dance is a native of Lincoln, Nebraska. She initially enrolled at the University of Nebraska for her freshman year before transferring to Truman State, where she majored in exercise science with a biology minor and graduated with a perfect GPA.

== Awards and honors ==
- 2005 Walter Byers Postgraduate Scholarship (female recipient).
- 2005 ESPN The Magazine/CoSIDA Academic All-America Women’s At-Large (College Division) Academic All-American of the Year.
- 2006 NCAA Today’s Top VIII (now Today’s Top 10) Award (class of 2006).
