= Randal Pinkett =

American business consultant (born 1971)

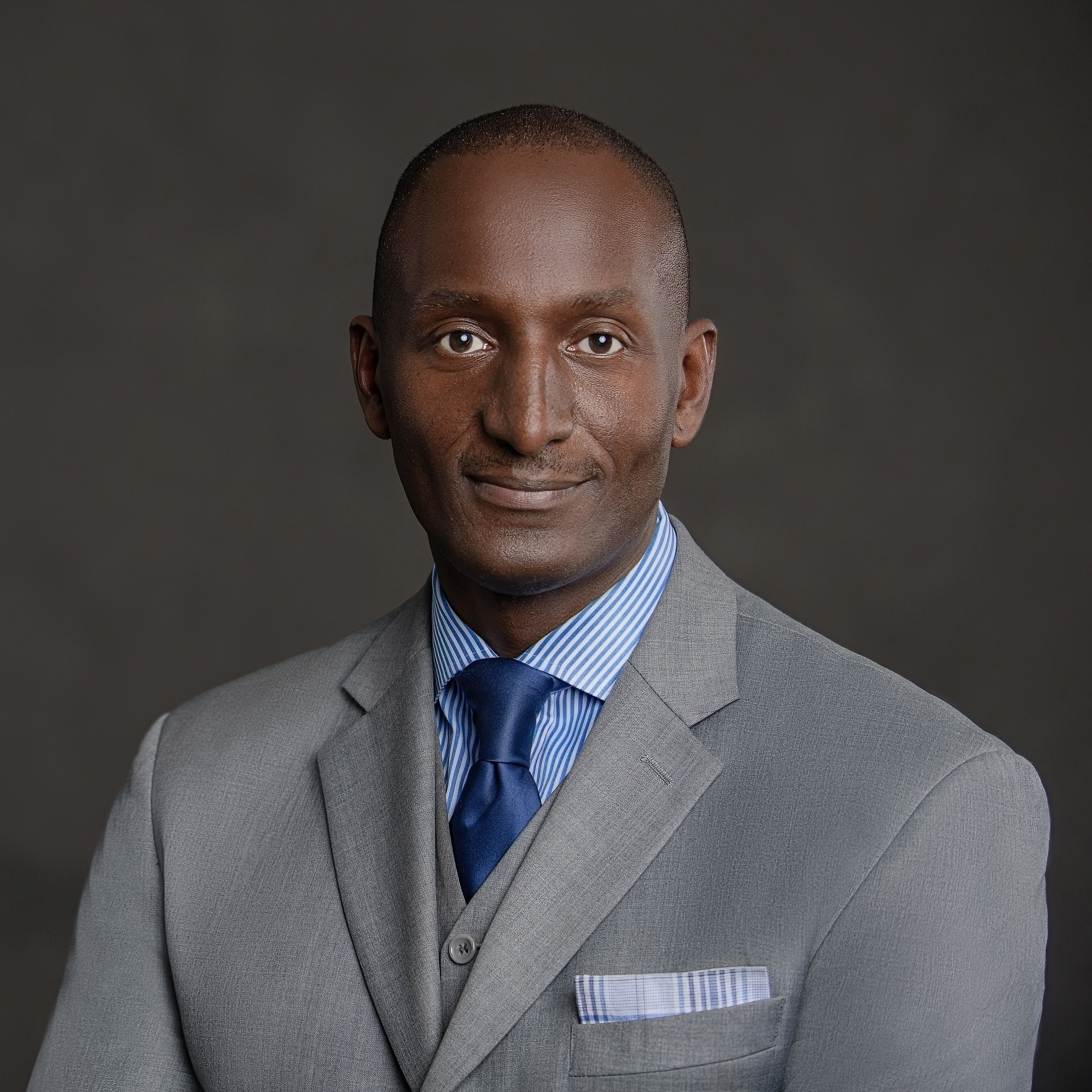
- Born: 1971 (age 54–55); Philadelphia, Pennsylvania, U.S.
- Education: Rutgers University, New Brunswick (BS); Keble College, Oxford (MS); Massachusetts Institute of Technology (MS, MBA, PhD)
- Political party: Democratic
- Spouse: Natasha Williams
- Children: 4
- Website: Official website

Randal D. Pinkett (born 1971) is an American business consultant who in 2005 was the winner of season four of the reality television show The Apprentice. Pinkett is the first African American to win the American version of The Apprentice.

With an educational background in engineering and business, Pinkett is both a Rhodes Scholar and a Walter Byers Scholar, and holds five academic degrees. Before entering the reality show, Pinkett had already established a career in business and had become co-founder of business consulting firm BCT Partners in 2001. As winner of The Apprentice Season 4 in December 2005, Pinkett undertook a yearlong apprenticeship with Trump Entertainment Resorts in Atlantic City, New Jersey.

After The Apprentice, Pinkett has continued as chairman and CEO of BCT Partners, while also acting as a public speaker and appearing on later editions of the show, and on CEO Exchange; he has also entered politics.

== Early life ==
Raised in East Windsor, New Jersey, Pinkett graduated from Hightstown High School in neighboring Hightstown. He was a three sport athlete (soccer, basketball, track and field) in high school.

In 1989, he began attending Rutgers University and graduated summa cum laude in 1994, with a BS in electrical engineering. At Rutgers, he was the recipient of the James Dickson Carr and Paul Robeson scholarships. He was captain of the Men’s Track and Field Team, competing as a high jumper and long jumper, and in 1993, he was named Arthur Ashe Jr. Sports Scholar by Diverse: Issues in Higher Education. In 1994, he was named the Walter Byers Scholarship winner as the NCAA's top male scholar athlete, and received recognition as an USA TODAY College All-Academic First Team member and NCAA Academic All-American. Pinkett was inducted into the Cap and Skull Honor Society, and served two terms as president of MEET, the Rutgers Chapter of the National Society of Black Engineers.

In 1994, Pinkett was selected as the first African American Rhodes Scholar from Rutgers. He attended the University of Oxford from 1994 to 1996 as a member of Keble College, where he earned an MSc in computer science.

After Oxford, Pinkett attended MIT from 1996 to 1998, where he graduated with a second MS, this time in electrical engineering, and an M.B.A. from the MIT Sloan School of Management through the Leaders for Global Operations program. He continued his education at MIT, where he earned a PhD in media arts and sciences from the MIT Media Laboratory in 2001. Pinkett's PhD thesis is titled "Creating Community Connections: Sociocultural Constructionism and an Asset-Based Approach to Community Technology and Community Building."

== The Apprentice ==
In 2005, 34-year-old Pinkett, along with 17 other contestants, entered the Season 4 of The Apprentice. His wife downloaded the application form, planting the idea of auditioning for the show in his mind. The Apprentice is a reality television series which premiered in January 2004, in which American entrepreneur Donald Trump uses a series of tasks and a process of elimination to ultimately select one candidate for a yearlong apprenticeship with one of his companies. The fourth season began filming in May 2005 and began airing September 2005; the two-episode finale aired on December 8 and 15, 2005. Pinkett reached the finale with one other contestant, 23-year-old financial journalist Rebecca Jarvis. Pinkett was to organise a celebrity ballgame for Autism Speaks, while Jarvis' task was to stage a comedy night in aid of the Elizabeth Glaser Pediatric AIDS Foundation. Despite the game's being rained out, Pinkett raised nearly $11,000.

In the final judgement, Trump criticized Pinkett for not spotlighting the celebrities in attendance at his event, and by Trump's advisor Carolyn Kepcher for not having a backup plan when the weather turned. Despite this, Trump chose Pinkett as the winner, describing him as an "amazing leader" and saying, "Rarely have I seen a leader as good as you, and you lead through niceness". Moments after the announcement, Trump asked Pinkett his opinion as to whether Trump should take the unprecedented step and hire the "outstanding" Jarvis, too. In his reply, Pinkett asserted that there could only be one winner of the contest, a view which Trump chose to agree with. This stance attracted much comment after the show, and Pinkett later defended his rationale, but made it clear he had no objection to Jarvis' being hired by the Trump organization at a later date. The reactions had taken Pinkett by surprise, but he later stated he remained on good terms with Jarvis. Speaking years later about the incident, Pinkett told a reporter for The New Yorker: "The only conclusion I can draw is that he [Trump] didn’t want to see a black man be the sole winner of his show."

Pinkett started his apprenticeship on February 6, 2006. His task was to oversee the $110m renovation of the Trump Taj Mahal, the Trump Plaza Hotel and Casino, and the Trump Marina, three casino resorts operated by Trump Entertainment Resorts in Atlantic City, New Jersey.

== Politics ==
In July 2006, Pinkett served as a co-chairman of the transition team of newly elected Newark, New Jersey Mayor Cory Booker.

On July 14, 2009, it was reported by a number of sources that Pinkett had emerged as the frontrunner to be New Jersey Governor Jon Corzine's selection for lieutenant governor in the 2009 Gubernatorial election. Some reports indicated an announcement would be made on Thursday, July 16. However, no announcement took place, and criticism appeared in the media and from some political leaders regarding Corzine's potential selection of a running mate with no experience in public office. Later in the week, news reports indicated Pinkett's selection was less likely and that other front runners had emerged, due at least in part to public criticism of the idea of a political newcomer as the Governor's running mate. On July 24, Corzine selected State Senator Loretta Weinberg. In 2009, Pinkett was the chair of the State Democratic Committee's Yes We Can 2.0; its name based on Barack Obama's campaign slogan, it sought to turn out newly registered voters from the 2008 presidential election for the gubernatorial election.

== Personal life ==
Pinkett is married to Natasha Williams-Pinkett, and the couple have four children. The family resides in Dayton, New Jersey.

Pinkett is a member of Alpha Phi Alpha fraternity, Theta Psi Lambda Chapter.

== Awards and honors ==
- 2006—Paul Robeson Leadership Award, Concerned Black Men of Massachusetts.
- 2023—Axiom Award (with Jeffrey Robinson) for Black Faces in High Places: Ten Strategic Actions for Black Professionals to Reach the Top and Stay There.
- 2024—Axiom Award, Gold medal, Business/Human Resources/Employee Training, for Data-Driven DEI: The Tools and Metrics You Need to Measure, Analyze and Improve Diversity, Equity & Inclusion
- 2024—Hightstown High Hall of Fame, basketball inductee

== Bibliography ==
- Pinkett, Randal (2007). Campus CEO: The Student Entrepreneur's Guide to Launching a Multimillion-Dollar Business. Kaplan Business. ISBN 9780739486566. .
- Pinkett, Randal (2008). No-Money Down CEO: How to Start Your Dream Business with Little or No Cash. Trump University. ISBN 978-0979059483.
- Pinkett, Randal; Robinson, Jeffrey (2010). Black Faces in White Places: 10 Game-Changing Strategies to Achieve Success and Find Greatness. AMACOM Books. ISBN 9780814416815.
