= Rob Zatechka =

American football player (born 1971)

No. 73
- Position: Guard

Personal information
- Born: December 1, 1971 (age 54); Lansing, Michigan, U.S.
- Listed height: 6 ft 4 in (1.93 m)
- Listed weight: 313 lb (142 kg)

Career information
- High school: Lincoln East
- College: Nebraska
- NFL draft: 1995: 4th round, 128th overall pick

Career history
- New York Giants (1995–1998)

Awards and highlights
- National champion (1994); Draddy Trophy (1994); Second-team All-Big Eight (1994)

Career NFL statistics
- Games played: 47
- Games started: 9
- Stats at Pro Football Reference

Robert Brett Zatechka (born December 1, 1971) is an American former professional football player who was an offensive lineman in the National Football League (NFL) for the New York Giants. He was born to Douglas and Jane Zatechka in 1971. He played college football for the Nebraska Cornhuskers and was selected in the fourth round of the 1995 NFL draft. In college, he won both the Draddy Trophy and a Walter Byers Scholarship. He was the first Giant draft pick to sign after the 1995 draft.

After his playing days ended, he slimmed down from 320 pounds (150 kg; 23 st) to 260 pounds (120 kg; 19 st) before returning to school at Omaha, Nebraska's University of Nebraska Medical Center. Zatechka graduated medical school in 2004, completed a residency in anesthesia at the University of Nebraska Medical Center in 2008, and is currently practicing in Omaha at OrthoNebraska.
