= Dean Smith (engineer) =

American basketball player and engineer

Dean Smith is a former winner of the Walter Byers Award as the National Collegiate Athletic Association's annual winner of its highest academic honor in recognition of being the nation's top scholar-athlete. He is an engineer specializing in chemical warfare agent detection. The University of Maine has renamed its top scholar-athlete award the M Club Dean Smith Award.
