= Rob Pelinka =

American basketball executive (born 1969)

Los Angeles Lakers
- Title: President of basketball operations / General manager
- League: NBA

Personal information
- Born: December 23, 1969 (age 56) Chicago, Illinois, U.S.
- Listed height: 6 ft 6 in (1.98 m)
- Listed weight: 200 lb (91 kg)

Career information
- High school: Lake Forest (Lake Forest, Illinois)
- College: Michigan (1988–1993)
- Position: Point guard
- Number: 25, 3

Career highlights
- As player: NCAA champion (1989); NCAA Male Scholar-Athlete of the Year (1993); As executive: NBA champion (2020)

Robert Todd Pelinka Jr. (born December 23, 1969) is an American basketball executive, lawyer, sports agent, and former college basketball player. He is currently the president of basketball operations and general manager of the Los Angeles Lakers of the National Basketball Association (NBA).

Before joining the Lakers, he was Kobe Bryant's agent and president and CEO of the Landmark Sports Agency, LLC. Pelinka has represented many players who have been top-14 picks since the 2003 NBA draft, including two at the 2010 NBA draft and second-overall 2011 NBA draft selection Derrick Williams. In the 2012 NBA draft, Pelinka represented Dion Waiters and Andre Drummond, who were selected 4th and 9th overall, respectively. Pelinka was formerly Kevin Durant's agent; he resigned as Carlos Boozer's agent following a controversy in which Boozer signed a contract with the Utah Jazz after allegedly promising to re-sign with the Cleveland Cavaliers.

Pelinka played basketball for Lake Forest High School, earning All-American honors. As a junior, he led Lake Forest High School to its first conference championship. Entering his senior season, Pelinka was overlooked by many Division I scouts and recruiters. However, his MVP performance in a four-game tournament, where he made all 42 of his free throws, and his impressive season statistics enabled him to become a highly recruited athlete by the end of his senior year. He was selected to several regional all-star lists and to play on several regional all-star teams as a senior.

He was recruited by the University of Michigan, where he has the distinction of being the only person in school history to have been a member of three National Collegiate Athletic Association (NCAA) Final Four teams: the 1988–89 NCAA Men's Division I Basketball Champion Wolverines basketball team as well as both the 1991–92 and the 1992–93 national championship runners-up, which were best remembered as the Fab Five teams. Pelinka holds a Juris Doctor cum laude from the University of Michigan Law School (1996) and Bachelor of Business Administration from the University of Michigan Ross School of Business (1993). Pelinka was also named the 1993 NCAA Male Walter Byers Scholar Athlete of the Year.

== Early life ==
Pelinka is the son of Robert Todd Pelinka Sr., a former high school basketball coach who taught him the fundamentals of basketball. He has one sibling, a sister, named Sally.

== High school career ==
Pelinka became a high school All-American basketball player at Lake Forest High School. Regarded as one of the best shooters in the Chicago area, alongside teammate Coley Brannon. the 6 ft 3.5 in (1.92 m) junior led Lake Forest to their first conference championship as an all-conference guard. However, the team lost in the first round of postseason play in 1987. Pelinka also played in the Chicago pro-amateur leagues where he played against local stars such as Mark Aguirre, Tim Hardaway, Kevin Duckworth and Kendall Gill.

By his senior season, he was listed at 6 ft 6 in (1.98 m), and moved to the point guard position from the shooting guard position in the absence of Douglass, who had graduated and joined future Big Ten opponent Wisconsin, as a starting point guard. As a senior, Pelinka was a preseason selection by the Chicago Sun-Times as one of the top 50 Chicago metropolitan area high school basketball players and top five North Suburban players. However, he was not a national preseason top 500 pick by Street & Smith's basketball magazine, which may have been because his senior season marked the first season that the three-point shot was adopted by state high school associations and Pelinka was mainly a shooter. Furthermore, scouts such as Chicago-based David Kaplan, who questioned his true height and dribbling ability, doubted whether he was talented enough to play for either of his targeted colleges (Michigan and Notre Dame) even in late December of his senior year despite his having had multiple 30-point efforts already.

During the four-game December 1987 Elgin tournament, in which he was named MVP, Pelinka made all 41 of his free throws and recorded a tournament record 139 points, including 45 in one game. Pelinka's streak of consecutive free throws made ended at 45, but later recounts showed he had 42 free throws in the tournament and 46 consecutive overall, which ranked fourth in Illinois high school basketball history at the time of his graduation. After his tournament performance, Pelinka responded through the press to a scout who felt he might be limited to Division II or mid-major programs such as William & Mary that since he was able to score 45 points against a player committed to play for DePaul, he could succeed at the Division I high-major level. He had only been recruited by William & Mary, Navy, Wisconsin-Green Bay and Ivy League schools before his tournament performance. Afterwards, at least three Big Ten Conference schools showed interest—Illinois, Minnesota and Wisconsin—although no scouts were allowed to attend any games before February 8.

By the beginning of February of his senior year, Pelinka was listed as one of the top ten Class AA (the larger school class) basketball players in Illinois by Illinois High School Basketball magazine. By the time of the scouting deadline of February 8, when college scouts could start attending his games, Pelinka was averaging 30 points and 10 rebounds per game; Illinois, Michigan, Notre Dame and North Carolina showed interest in him. Even previously doubtful scout Kaplan noted that of the players who waited until the April signing period instead of signing in November, Pelinka was one of the best in the Chicago area.

At the conclusion of the season, Pelinka had a 30-point-per-game average that benefited from a 41% three-point shot percentage over the course of 208 attempts. Pelinka was named to the post-(regular) season All-Chicago area top 20 players by the Chicago Sun-Times. He was named among the 20 Class AA All-state players in a class that included Eric Anderson, LaPhonso Ellis, Acie Earl, and Deon Thomas. In addition to various all-star lists, Pelinka was selected to play for various regional all-star teams. He earned a coveted spot in the Schlitz League, teaming up with Maurice Cheeks for Luster Premium Hair Products.

Pelinka's final decision came down to a choice between Illinois and Michigan. Pelinka chose Michigan because of its academically stronger law school and business school. After selecting Michigan, he had notable performances in his regional all-star games, including a 27-point performance in the annual City-Suburban all-star game.

In January 2009, Pelinka was one of two players who did not attend the twentieth anniversary reunion of the 1989 championship team. In February, Matt Vogrich broke Pelinka's Lake Forest High School scoring record. Vogrich followed in Pelinka's footsteps, playing as a freshman for the Wolverines basketball team in the 2009–10 season.

== College career ==
=== Freshman season (1988–1989) ===
As a guard, Pelinka became the first Michigan Wolverine to reach three NCAA Tournament Final Fours during his Michigan Wolverines career. He played in the 1988–89, 1990–91, 1991–92, and 1992–93 seasons; the team reached the championship game of the Final Four in three out of four of those seasons. As a true freshman member of the 1988–89 National Champions, his teammates included Glen Rice, Terry Mills, Loy Vaught, Rumeal Robinson, Sean Higgins, Demetrius Calip, and Mark Hughes. As a redshirt member of the 1991–92 and 1992–93 national runners-up, his teammates included Chris Webber, Juwan Howard, Jalen Rose, Jimmy King, Ray Jackson (the Fab Five), and Eric Riley. He was one of several upperclassmen on the Fab Five teams and served as co-captain of the 1992–93 team. As a scholar, he was noted for having a grade point average that rivaled his scoring average.

During Pelinka's freshman season, Michigan was picked by many to win the Big Ten Conference and was ranked number one in the nation, according to some preseason polls. He was the only true freshman to play in either of the first two games of the season. Pelinka's only start of the season came in the December 12, 1988 game against Holy Cross. This game followed the team's first loss of the season, which had come against Division II Alaska–Anchorage, after an 11–0 start and after which coach Bill Frieder benched three starters. Pelinka posted his season highs in points (8), rebounds (5) and minutes (18) in this game. During a practice, Pelinka was knocked unconscious and lost two teeth. As the team entered the March stretch run, Pelinka and Calip were the only reserve guards backing up Robinson and Higgins. The team went on to win the 1989 NCAA Men's Division I Basketball Tournament against Seton Hall at the Kingdome in Seattle, Washington. When the team visited the White House, Pelinka held Rumeal Robinson's suit coat, while Robinson and United States President George H. W. Bush reenacted Robinson's game winning free throws.

=== Redshirt season (1989–1990) ===
When tendinitis afflicted his knees, Pelinka redshirted the 1989–90 season. During his redshirt sophomore season, Pelinka was not called on to take many important shots. He did have an opportunity to take a 20-foot shot with five seconds left in what turned out to be a 76–74 loss to Texas on December 29, 1990, but he missed the shot. In this game, he played a season-high twenty-eight minutes in his only start of the season and first of his collegiate career. Pelinka was also instrumental in setting up some key shots such as a pass to Calip during a frenetic sequence to tie Minnesota in the waning minutes of the game. The team finished with at 14–15 overall (7–11 Big Ten) record after losing to Colorado in the first round of the NIT.

=== Sophomore season (1990–1991) ===
During his redshirt junior year, he was joined at Michigan by the Fab Five, who were all true freshmen. He was injured for part of the season. When he was healthy, he was an important reserve player. After sitting out the first half, he scored the overtime opening three-point shot and made three of four overtime free throws in an 89–79 road victory against Michigan State at the Breslin Center on January 29, 1992. Pelinka had also contributed an earlier three-point shot as Michigan erased a thirteen-point deficit to force the overtime. Pelinka also contributed his season-high nineteen minutes and a second-half career-high eleven points (eclipsed in his senior season) in a March 11, 1992 70–61 victory against Purdue at the Mackey Arena. Michigan head coach Steve Fisher credited both of these wins to Pelinka and also noted his two important three-point shots against East Tennessee State. The team lost in the final game of the 1992 NCAA Tournament. After the season, he went with the team on a 9-game 16-day European trip. According to press accounts, the team was homesick during the trip and Pelinka got sick from drinking tap water.

=== Junior season (1991–1992) ===
The following season, Michigan returned its top nine scorers and began the season ranked number one in the Associated Press national ranking as Pelinka was part of a quartet of seniors backing up the Fab Five, who had become sophomores. As a 6 ft 6 in (1.98 m) 200-pound (91 kg) fifth-year senior, Pelinka started back-to-back games twice during the season. Early in the season, he started in place of the injured Jackson, but Pelinka came down with the flu after two starts against Kansas and Eastern Michigan on December 30, 1992, and January 2, 1993, respectively. During his other set of back-to-back starts against Ohio State and Iowa on January 26 and 31, 1993, Pelinka started even though Jackson played. Pelinka set several season and career highs, including points (16), in the 72–62 home victory over Ohio State. The sixteen points included six free throws that were among the nine consecutive Michigan made in the final 2:13.

=== Senior season (1992–1993) ===
During his senior season, Pelinka was an important role player for the team who drew the most charges on the team and contributed important defensive minutes as the sixth man. During the 1992–93 season, he led all reserves in minutes and assists and was second in points and rebounds (to Eric Riley). Pelinka was also instrumental as a leader during the run to the Final Four. Having been the only member of the team in Seattle for the 1989 championship, when the 1993 team played its regional championship games in Seattle, Pelinka was able to show Webber the spot in the locker room where Rice had taken his pre-game nap. During the Final Four weekend in New Orleans, Louisiana, Chris Webber wore Pelinka's 1989 Championship ring, which only fit on Webber's pinky finger, and slept with it under his pillow. During the national semifinal 81–78 overtime victory against the Kentucky Wildcats, Pelinka played in the clinching overtime period after King fouled out. Nonetheless, despite a pair of early three-point shots by Pelinka after Jackson got two early personal fouls, the team lost in the final game of the 1993 NCAA Tournament against North Carolina. When the team returned to Ann Arbor, Michigan for a rally at Crisler Arena the following day, Pelinka was one of only two Wolverines to speak to the crowd. After his senior season, he played in an NBA Summer Camp in Long Beach, California and considered offers to play professionally in Europe. At this time, he first met sports agent Arn Tellem and decided not to play basketball. As of 2004 he remained in 15th place on the all-time Michigan games played list. Pelinka won the 1993 NCAA Walter Byers Postgraduate Scholarship award (NCAA Male Scholar Athlete of the Year).

== Sports agent career ==
After passing the Illinois bar examination and receiving his license to practice in 1996, Pelinka joined Mayer Brown. After two years at Mayer Brown, Arn Tellem convinced Pelinka to become a lawyer for SFX management, and after two years at SFX, he became an agent. While with SFX, he worked with Tellem who represented Eddy Curry, Kwame Brown, Kobe Bryant and Tracy McGrady, all of whom went directly from high school to the National Basketball Association. Pelinka had become Bryant's agent by the time of the Kobe Bryant sexual assault case. While at SFX, he also became the agent for several of his current clients. While at SFX in 2004, he was living in Santa Monica, California and dating a pediatrician. NBA agents earn about 4% of the salary and bonus that they negotiate for their clients.

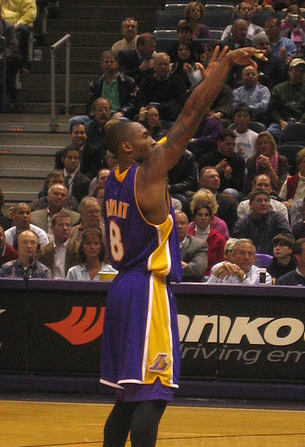
Kobe Bryant shoots a free throw.

Pelinka then branched out on his own and founded The Landmark Sports Agency. Recently, he has represented several first-round lottery picks: sixth overall 2003 NBA draft selection, Chris Kaman, ninth overall 2004 NBA draft selection, Andre Iguodala, eighth overall 2005 NBA draft selection, Channing Frye, thirteenth overall 2007 NBA draft selection, Julian Wright, seventh overall 2008 NBA draft selection, Eric Gordon, and third overall 2009 NBA draft selection, James Harden, 4th and 13th overall 2010 NBA draft selections, Wesley Johnson and Ed Davis, 2nd overall 2011 NBA draft selection Derrick Williams, and Buddy Hield, the sixth overall pick in 2016.

Among the players he has formerly represented are DeShawn Stevenson and Fred Hoiberg. A Los Angeles resident who was raised in Illinois, Pelinka represents two players who, like him, played high school basketball in the Chicago area (Corey Maggette and Julian Wright) and a third who had been a high school star in Springfield, Illinois (Iguodala). He has represented several Arizona Wildcats players including Andre Iguodala and Channing Frye. Pelinka is regarded as one of the world's leading sports agents according to Business Insider, who ranked him 5th in 2010.

Pelinka is well known as the agent of Kobe Bryant, who retired at the end of the 2015–16 season after 20 seasons as a perennial All-Star guard for the Los Angeles Lakers. In fact, some of his other clients have hired him because of this. During the 2003 sexual assault case against Bryant, Pelinka spent a considerable amount of time with his client. He accompanied him on trips to Eagle, Colorado. It was Pelinka who confirmed the news of Bryant's second child. In 2004, when Bryant was a free agent, Pelinka confirmed Bryant would remain in Los Angeles with either the Lakers or the Los Angeles Clippers while rumors were flying that he was going to sign with the Chicago Bulls. Subsequently, when Rudy Tomjanovich was hired to be the Lakers' head coach, he sent free agent Bryant and Pelinka a video package describing the things he has done for players at Bryant's position. A few days later, Pelinka negotiated a contract for Bryant to remain with the Lakers for $136.4 million over seven years. When Bryant demanded to be traded during the 2007 offseason, Pelinka confirmed that "Kobe would like to be moved." He was also the godfather of Kobe's daughter, Gianna Bryant.

=== Draft success and controversy (2008–2009) ===
Eric Gordon was drafted seventh overall in the 2008 NBA draft. Sasha Vujačić, a 2008 restricted free agent, left his agent, Bill Duffy, and hired Pelinka to be his new agent in July 2008. He had previously left Pelinka for Duffy. Maggette signed on July 10 with the Golden State Warriors for $50 million over five years. On July 21, Dooling was traded to the New Jersey Nets from the Orlando Magic in what was described as a sign and trade deal with no terms of the signing revealed. Dooling's 2008–09 cap hold (salary cap allocation) with the Magic was $7,192,000. On July 25, Vujačić, who had rejected a 3-year $12 million offer after receiving a qualifying offer of $2.6 million and had planned to accept an offer to play in Europe, signed a 3-year $15 million offer to return to the Lakers. However, after signing, some sources listed Vujačić as unaffiliated with any sports agent.

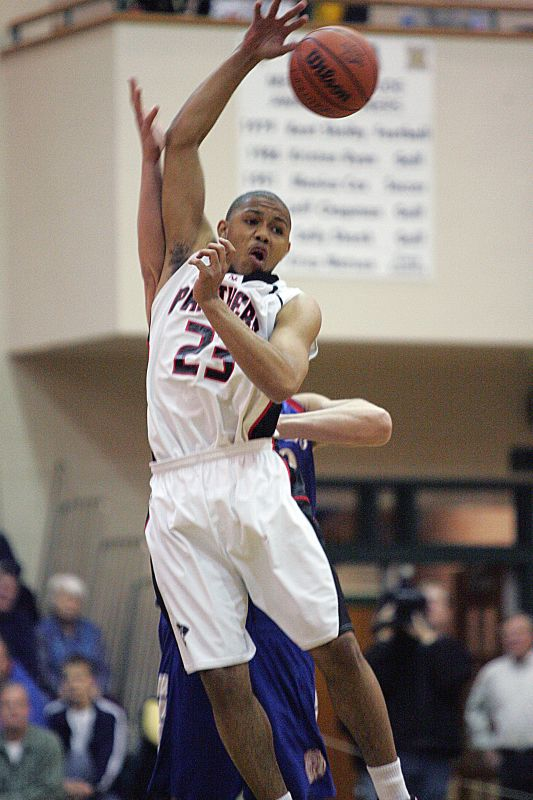
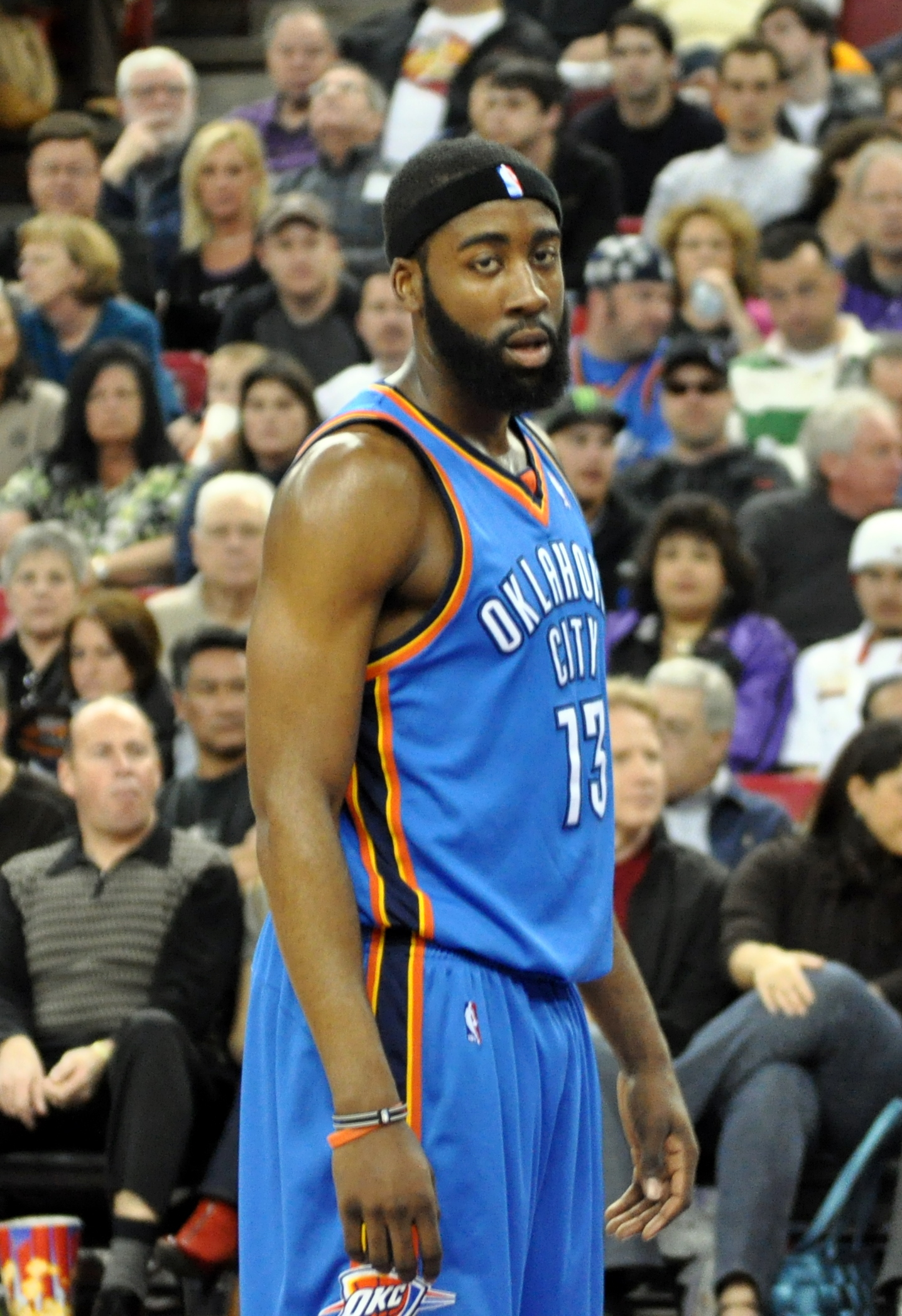
Left: Eric Gordon, 2007 Indiana Mr. Basketball, playing for North Central High School; Right: James Harden as a member of the Oklahoma City Thunder

The Philadelphia 76ers made Iguodala a qualifying offer of $3,800,625 for the 2008–09 season. This gave the 76ers the right to match any superior offer sheet signed by Iguodala and gave Iguodala the option to play under the terms of the qualifying offer for one season in order to be an unrestricted free agent afterwards. In 2007, Iguodala rejected a $57 million contract extension. Iguodala had a 2008–09 cap hold of $11,401,875. On August 12, the 76ers and Iguodala agreed to a six-year $80 million contract.

Gordon withdrew from NBA Summer League play with a strained left hamstring in mid July 2008. However, rookie first round draft picks are on a strict two-year pay scale with team options for the third and fourth year, according to the collective bargaining agreement. Gordon had signed a three-year $8.4 million contract with the Clippers in early July. The contract has a fourth year qualifying option.

Pelinka's clients made news off the court as Boozer filed for divorce and Bryant's former housekeeper filed suit against him in March.

At the 2009 NBA draft, he represented third overall selection James Harden. Having represented Wright at the 2007 NBA draft and Gordon at the 2008 draft, this marked the third consecutive year that Pelinka represented a high first round client. Harden signed with the Oklahoma City Thunder, but terms were not disclosed. For the 2009–10 NBA season, Wright's contract is at a team option of $2,000,040, Bryant and Boozer have player's options of $23,034,375 and $12,323,900 respectively and Frye's qualifying offer amount was $4,264,760. Prior to the June 30 decision deadline, Bryant elected not to opt out of his contract and was expected to sign a new three-year extension. Also prior to the deadline, Boozer decided to exercise the final year of his contract with the Jazz. The New Orleans Hornets exercised their team option on Wright. The Portland Trail Blazers decided not to make Frye a qualifying offer, which made him an unrestricted free agent, and prevented the Blazers from having the right to match the two-year offer he agreed to with the Phoenix Suns.

Draftees represented
Draft	Selection	Player	Notes
2003	6th	Chris Kaman	
2004	9th	Andre Iguodala	
2005	8th	Channing Frye	
2007	13th	Julian Wright	
2008	7th	Eric Gordon	
2009	3rd	James Harden	
2010	4th	Wesley Johnson	
2010	13th	Ed Davis	
2011	2nd	Derrick Williams	
2012	4th	Dion Waiters	
2012	9th	Andre Drummond	
2014	5th	Dante Exum	
2014	24th	Shabazz Napier	
2015	24th	Tyus Jones	
2016	6th	Buddy Hield	
2016	8th	Marquese Chriss	

=== Large contracts (2010–2011) ===
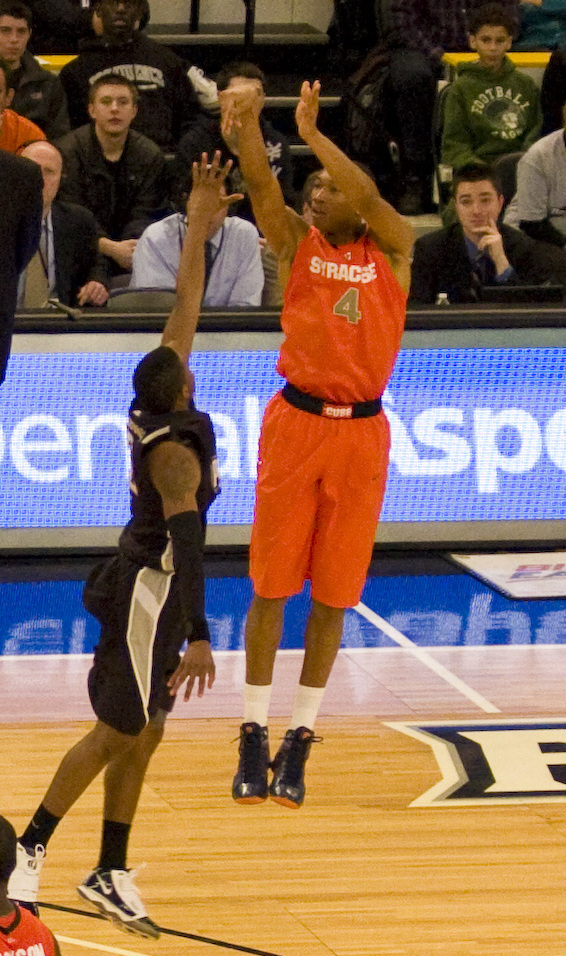
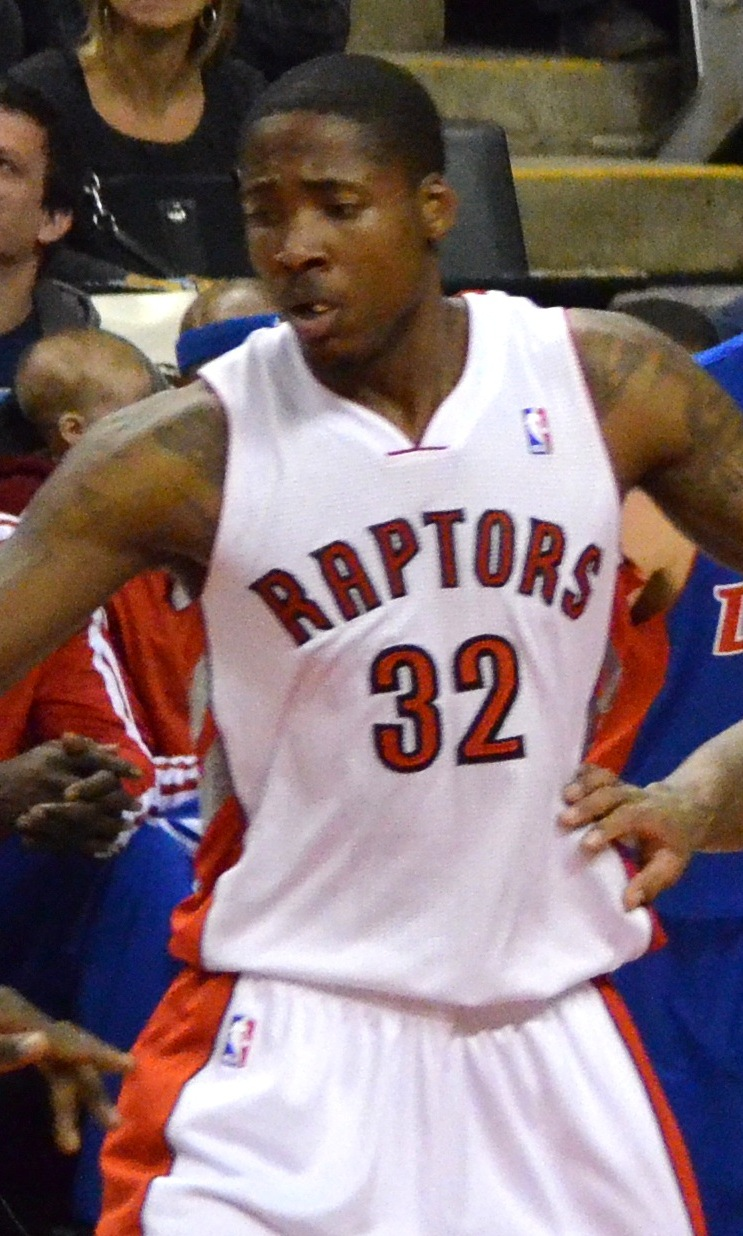
Wesley Johnson (left) and Ed Davis (right) were Pelinka clients in the 2010 NBA draft.

Toward the end of the 2009–10 NBA season Pelinka negotiated a three-year extension for Bryant, committing him to the Lakers through the 2013–14 season. Boozer becomes an unrestricted free agent when the 2009–10 season ends. Fisher is also unsigned. Pelinka has signed both Johnson and Davis who were chosen 4th and 13th respectively in the 2010 NBA draft. On July 14, the Lakers announced that they resigned Fisher to what was reported to be a 3-year $10.5 million contract according to ESPN. NBA.com reported that Boozer signed a 5-year $75 million contract with the Chicago Bulls.

In addition to 2011 NBA Draft prospect Williams, Pelinka had to represent unsigned Peterson and Vujacic; team option players Gordon and Harden and qualifying option player Wright following the 2010–11 NBA season. Williams was selected 2nd overall. O. J. Mayo signed with Pelinka in the offseason, bringing Pelinka's client list up to 18 NBA players. On June 28, the Oklahoma City Thunder exercised team options on several players including Harden.

At the beginning of the 2011 NBA lockout, Pelinka, who represented 18 NBA players at the time, was considering putting together a touring team to play exhibition games in China. During the lockout Bryant received offers to play for Virtus Pallacanestro Bologna that Pelinka negotiated. Although there were difficulties signing Bryant to play in October to due scheduling conflicts, Virtus made an offer worth over $3 million for Bryant to play in 10 games starting in November.

Vujacic signed a one-year deal to play with the Anadolu Efes of the Turkish Basketball League. His contract did not have an out clause if the NBA lockout was resolved early enough to salvage the 2011–12 NBA season. On December 13, Williams signed with the Timberwolves. 4-year veteran Wright and 11-year veteran Peterson did not sign with NBA teams.

In February, Durant left long-time agent Aaron Goodwin. The following month he signed with Pelinka who represented his teammate Harden. Pelinka signed Dion Waiters. At the NBA Draft Combine, Pelinka had Waiters stop his workouts and skip the interview portions of the combine. There was speculation that he had a high draft position promise. Pelinka also signed Andre Drummond. Waiters was selected fourth overall by the Cleveland Cavaliers and Drummond was selected ninth overall by the Detroit Pistons. At the end of the 2011–12 NBA season, Kaman, Wallace, Fisher and Dooling were unsigned. The New Jersey Nets had Bird rights to Wallace. Mayo, Gordon, Johnson and newly signed Austin Daye all had options.

Waiters signed a $16.7 million four-year contract (two years, plus two team options) that was based on the rookie wage scales determined by the collective bargaining agreement. Drummond also signed a multi-year contract. Kaman signed a one-year $8 million contract with the Dallas Mavericks. Wallace re-signed with the Nets for 4 years and $40 million. The Memphis Grizzlies did not make Mayo a $7.2 million qualifying offer, thus allowing him to become an unrestricted free agent. He subsequently signed with the Mavericks for two years (with a player option in the second year). The New Orleans Hornets matched the Phoenix Suns' 4-year $58 million contract for Gordon.

=== Later agent years (2013–2016) ===
In April 2013, Pelinka was inducted into his high school's wall of fame. Durant left Pelinka in the offseason. Iguodala declined a one-year $16 million contract from the Denver Nuggets and met with a half dozen teams when the free agency period opened. He then signed a four-year $48 million contract with the Golden State Warriors. Mayo was also an unrestricted free agent. Pelinka's 2010 fourth overall draftee Johnson signed a one-year deal with the Lakers for the 4th year veteran's minimum salary of $916,099 after, teaming with Pelinka clients Bryant as well as Kaman, who signed with the Lakers the prior week. Trevor Ariza switched agents to sign with Pelinka one year before his contract with the Washington Wizards was due to expire. On November 25, Bryant signed a two-year contract extension with the Lakers at an estimated value of $48.5 million that made him the first NBA player to play 20 years with the same franchise. He remained the league's highest-paid player, despite accepting the discounted deal; he had been eligible to receive an extension starting at $32 million per year.

Pelinka signed Dante Exum, who was selected by the Utah Jazz with the fifth overall pick in the 2014 NBA draft on June 26, 2014. On July 11, 2014, Exum signed with the Jazz. Pelinka also represented Shabazz Napier, chosen 24th overall in the 2014 draft by the Charlotte Hornets, who was later traded to the Miami Heat on draft night.

In the 2014 free agency period, Pelinka represented unsigned players Kaman, Fisher, Ariza, and Johnson; team option Drummond and Williams; qualifying offer player Davis. Kaman signed a two-year $9.8 million contract to play for the Portland Trail Blazers. Fisher signed a 5-year $25 million contract to be head coach for the New York Knicks. Ariza agreed to a 4-year $32 million contract to play for the Houston Rockets. Late in the year, Drummond left Pelinka for Jeff Schwartz.

Pelinka was rumored to be in the running to represent Stanley Johnson, but ultimately lost to Bill Duffy. In May 2015, Pelinka signed Shabazz Muhammad. He represented Tyus Jones at the June 25, 2015 NBA draft, where he was selected 24th by the Cleveland Cavaliers, who then traded him to his hometown Minnesota Timberwolves. Pelinka negotiated Harden a $200 million contract with Adidas that Nike opted not to match in August.

In January 2016, Avery Bradley left Mitchell Butler to sign with Pelinka after being disappointed with the results of a contract extension. During the lead-up to the 2016 NBA draft, Buddy Hield, the consensus college player of the year in 2015–16, signed with Pelinka. Marquese Chriss also signed with Pelinka. Hield was drafted 6th and Chriss was selected 8th.

== Executive career ==
=== Los Angeles Lakers (2017–present) ===
On February 21, 2017, media sources reported that the Los Angeles Lakers of the National Basketball Association (NBA) were set to hire Pelinka to serve as general manager as part of a management shakeup that included the hiring of Magic Johnson as executive vice president of basketball operations in place of Jim Buss and dismissing former GM Mitch Kupchak. On March 7, Pelinka signed a five-year deal to be the general manager of the Lakers. After he quit the Lakers, Johnson in an interview on ESPN's First Take on May 20, 2019, stated that Pelinka wanted his position and "backstabbed" him.

Pelinka has been criticized for his penchant for "storytelling", in other words embellishing or even totally misrepresenting the truth at times throughout his tenure with the Lakers. According to sources, in March 2018, as Dwayne "The Rock" Johnson addressed the players on the roster as part of a "Genius Talks" series, Pelinka told a story about his former client Kobe Bryant. In the story, Pelinka stated that after Bryant had seen Heath Ledger's performance in The Dark Knight, he requested Pelinka set him up with a dinner appointment with Ledger to see how Ledger pushed himself to focus and lock into the role of the Joker. According to Pelinka, Bryant "had dinner with Heath, and he talked about how he locks in for a role... and Kobe used some of that in his game against the Knicks." However, the Dark Knight film was released 6 months after Ledger's death, and a source close to the situation denied that such a dinner had ever taken place. In the words of a 2019 Lakers coaching staff member, "We think, more often than not, he's not being truthful. That goes throughout the organization."

Following Johnson's departure, Pelinka continued as the Lakers' general manager. In June 2019, the Lakers acquired Anthony Davis from the New Orleans Pelicans in exchange for Brandon Ingram, Lonzo Ball, Josh Hart and draft compensation. In January 2020, Pelinka was promoted to vice president of basketball operations while retaining his role as general manager. The Lakers finished the 2019–20 season with the best record in the Western Conference and defeated the Miami Heat in the 2020 NBA Finals, winning the franchise's 17th NBA championship. Pelinka finished seventh in voting for the 2019–20 NBA Executive of the Year Award, receiving one first-place vote.

On January 10, 2020, Pelinka was promoted to vice president of basketball operations while also maintaining his role as GM.

In 2021, the Lakers acquired Russell Westbrook from the Washington Wizards in exchange for a package including Kyle Kuzma, Kentavious Caldwell-Pope, Montrezl Harrell and a first-round draft pick. The Lakers finished the 2021–22 season 33–49 and missed the playoffs.

During the 2022–23 season, Pelinka restructured the roster through several midseason trades, acquiring Rui Hachimura and later trading Westbrook in a three-team deal that brought D'Angelo Russell, Jarred Vanderbilt and Malik Beasley to Los Angeles. The Lakers finished the regular season 18–9 following the roster overhaul and advanced to the Western Conference finals.

On the night of February 1–2, 2025, Pelinka together with longtime friend Nico Harrison concluded the Luka Dončić–Anthony Davis trade, considered by many to be one of the greatest coups in NBA history. On April 18, Pelinka and the Lakers agreed to a multiyear contract extension, and he was promoted to president of basketball operations, while remaining as the team's general manager.

== College statistics ==
The following are Pelinka's career statistics at the University of Michigan:

Season	GP	GS	MPG	FG%	3FG%	FT%	RPG	APG	STL	BLK	PPG
1988–89	24	1	4.5	.360	.286	0.7	0.6	0.4	3	2	1.2
1990–91	29	1	8	.288	.290	0.583	1.1	0.4	5	0	1.7
1991–92	28	0	9.1	.404	.320	0.871	1.6	0.7	3	0	2.8
1992–93	36	4	15.9	.417	.400	0.762	2.1	1	6	1	4.3
Total	117	6	10	.379	.346	0.768	1.4	0.6	17	3	2.7

== Personal life ==
Pelinka entered the Bachelor of Business Administration program at the University of Michigan's Ross School of Business where he accumulated a 3.9/4.0 grade point average. During his time at Michigan, he developed a close relationship with University of Michigan tax law professor Doug Kahn and his wife. In January 1993, Pelinka announced he was accepted to the University of Michigan Law School and the Northwestern University School of Law and stated that he hoped to become a professional sports agent after his athletic and academic careers were complete. After Michigan won the 1993 NCAA West Regional Final, Pelinka, who was one of six finalists, flew to St. Louis, Missouri for a final interview for the Walter Byers Scholarship. Later that week, Pelinka was honored with the 1993 Walter Byers Scholar Award as the NCAA's top male scholar athlete. Pelinka earned a variety of other scholar athlete awards. In the media, Pelinka is known for bearing striking resemblance to actor (and Lakers fan) Rob Lowe.

Instead of playing basketball in Europe, Pelinka chose to attend Michigan Law School after graduation and became a top law student. During his first year of law school, several of his former teammates appeared in Blue Chips: Billy Douglass (Lake Forest), Eric Anderson (Chicago All-star), and Demitrius Calip (Michigan). While in law school, he took several classes from Kahn. During his second year in law school, he became the home game color analyst for Wolverines basketball play-by-play announcer Chuck Swirsky on a 16-station broadcast network that originated from WJR-AM, and he debuted on December 22, 1994, during a game against Jackson State University. While in law school, he interned for Winston & Strawn LLP. Pelinka earned his Juris Doctor cum laude in 1996.

== Notes ==
Sporting positions
Preceded by Mitch Kupchak	Los Angeles Lakers General Manager; 2017–present	Incumbent
