= Calvin Thigpen =

American distance runner

Samuel "Calvin" Thigpen graduated from the University of Mississippi with Bachelor of Science in Chemistry and Math in 1999. He served as associated student body president from 1997 to 1998. While ASB President he led the student charge to remove the confederate flag from home football games by passing a "stick ban" in the student senate. Thigpen was the male winner of the National Collegiate Athletic Association's highest academic honor, the 1999 Walter Byers Award, in recognition of being the nation's top male scholar-athlete. Thigpen was named a Rhodes Scholar in December 1998, and studied at Oxford University, Brasenose College from September 1999 through June 2001. He then returned to Mississippi and received his M.D. at University of Mississippi School of Medicine. In medical school, Thigpen was president of his medical school class, editor of the student newspaper "The Murmur," and received the Medical Student of the Year award. He obtained his M.D. in 2005.

He subsequently completed three years of training in Internal Medicine at the University of Mississippi Medical Center and was awarded "House Officer of the Year" in 2007 and "Resident of the Year" in 2008. He then served one additional year as Chief Resident in the Department of Internal Medicine at the same institution and was awarded "Chief Resident of the Year". He then completed a fellowship in Hematology and Oncology at the University of Mississippi Medical Center, during which he was named "Fellow of the Year" three years in a row. Currently, Thigpen serves as a clinical internist and rotating hospitalist at the University of Mississippi, as well as Program Director for the Internal Medicine Residency Program, the largest residency program at the University of Mississippi Medical Center. From 2017-2021, he served as Governor of the Mississippi Chapter of the American College of Physicians. In 2023, he became the eleventh Mississippian to be awarded Mastership by the American College of Physicians.. In 2025, he was selected as the Pierce Chair in Internal Medicine for his commitment to teaching future physicians in honor of the late Dr Bill Pierce.
