= Regan Rathwell =

Canadian swimmer (born 2002)

Personal information
- Born: February 11, 2004 (age 22) Ottawa, Ontario, Canada
- Height: 5 ft 9 in (175 cm)

Sport
- Country: Canada
- Sport: Swimming
- Strokes: Backstroke
- College team: University of Tennessee
- Coach: Ashley Jahn

Regan Rathwell (born February 11, 2004) is a Canadian competitive swimmer, primarily competing in the backstroke events.

== Career ==
Rathwell had four surgeries in a year in the lead up to the 2024 swimming season. At the 2024 Canadian Swim Trials, Rathwell dipped under the A standard for the 2024 Olympics in the 200 metres backstroke event. At the conclusion of the trials, Rathwell was named to Canada's 2024 Olympics team.
