= NCAA Woman of the Year Award =

US college athlete award

- Awarded for: A senior female athlete who has distinguished herself throughout her collegiate career in the areas of academic achievement, athletics excellence, service and leadership
- Country: United States
- Presented by: NCAA
- First award: 1991; 35 years ago
- Currently held by: Sam Schott
- Website: Official website

The NCAA Woman of the Year Award was created to honor senior female student-athletes who have distinguished themselves throughout their collegiate career in the areas of academic achievement, athletics excellence, service and leadership. Each year, nine finalists are selected from all candidates, three from each division, including Division I, Division II, and Division III. This selection has been given by the National Collegiate Athletic Association since 1991. These finalists represent the NCAA's vision of the finest of all female collegiate athletes.

== Recipients ==
Year	Athlete	School	Sport	Source
1991	Mary Beth Riley	Canisius College	Running (Cross Country)	
1992	Catherine Byrne	University of Tennessee	Swimming	
1993	Nnenna Lynch	Villanova University	Running	
1994	Tanya Jones	University of Arizona	Track and Field	
1995	Rebecca Lobo	University of Connecticut	Basketball	
1996	Billie Winsett-Fletcher	University of Nebraska–Lincoln	Volleyball	
1997	Lisa Coole	University of Georgia	Swimming	
1998	Peggy Boutilier	University of Virginia	Field Hockey; Lacrosse	
1999	Jamila Demby	University of California, Davis	Track and Field	
2000	Kristy Kowal	University of Georgia	Swimming	
2001	Kimberly A. Black	University of Georgia	Swimming	
2002	Tanisha Silas	University of California, Davis	Track and Field	
2003	Ashley Jo Rowatt Karpinos	Kenyon College	Swimming	
2004	Kelly Albin	University of California, Davis	Lacrosse	
2005	Lauryn McCalley	University of Tennessee	Swimming	
2006	Annie Bersagel	Wake Forest University	Runner	
2007	Whitney Myers	University of Arizona	Swimming	
2008	Nicky Anosike	University of Tennessee	Basketball	
2009	Lacey Nymeyer	University of Arizona	Swimming	
2010	Justine Schluntz	University of Arizona	Swimming	
2011	Laura Barito	Stevens Institute of Technology	Swimming; Track and Field	
2012	Elizabeth Phillips	Washington University in St. Louis	Running	
2013	Ifeatu Okafor	Texas Tech University	Track and Field	
2014	Elizabeth Tucker	University of Notre Dame	Soccer	
2015	Kristin Day	Clarion University of Pennsylvania	Swimming	
2016	Margaret Guo	Massachusetts Institute of Technology	Swimming	
2017	Lizzy Crist	Washington University in St. Louis	Soccer	
2018	Keturah Orji	University of Georgia	Track and Field	
2019	Angela Mercurio	University of Nebraska–Lincoln	Track and Field	
2020	Asia Seidt	University of Kentucky	Swimming	
2021	Kendall Cornick	Augustana University	Softball	
2022	Karenna Groff	Massachusetts Institute of Technology	Soccer	
2023	Logan Eggleston	University of Texas	Volleyball	
2024	Alexandra Turvey	Pomona College	Swimming	
2025	Sam Schott	University of Texas at Tyler	Softball	

== Awards won by school ==
This is a list of the colleges and universities who have had a player win the NCAA Woman of the Year Award.

School	Trophies
Arizona	4
Georgia	4
Tennessee	3
University of California, Davis	3
MIT	2
Nebraska	2
Augustana University	1
Canisius College	1
Clarion University	1
Connecticut	1
University of Kentucky	1
Kenyon College	1
Notre Dame	1
Pomona College	1
Stevens Institute of Technology	1
University of Texas, Austin	1
Texas Tech University	1
Villanova University	1
Wake Forest University	1
University of Virginia	1
Washington University, St. Louis	1
University of Texas at Tyler	1

== Awards won by sport ==
This is a list of the sports engaged by athletes who have won the NCAA Woman of the Year Award.

Sport	Awards
Basketball	2
Field Hockey	1
Lacrosse	2
Running	4
Soccer	2
Softball	2
Swimming	14
Track and Field	7
Volleyball	2

== 2024 Woman of the Year Top-9 Finalists ==
- Riley Felts, University of North Carolina at Charlotte
- Anna Grossheim, University of North Carolina at Pembroke
- Hannah Kassaie, Case Western Reserve University
- Caitlin Lyons, University of Georgia
- Maddy Miles, University of Mount Union
- Samantha Pirosko, Gannon University
- Shelby Robb, Metropolitan State University of Denver
- Alexandria Turvey, Pomona-Pitzer Colleges
- Isabella Whittaker, University of Pennsylvania

== 2023 Woman of the Year Top-9 Finalists ==
- Peyton Barnes, Fairmont State University
- Callie Dickinson, University of Georgia
- Logan Eggleston, University of Texas
- Kristen Palmer, Massachusetts Institute of Technology
- Charlotte Richards, University of Missouri-St. Louis
- Ellie Shahbo, Harvard University
- Sophia Glory Slovenski, University of Southern Maine
- Anika Washburn, Case Western Reserve University
- Madi Wulfekotter, University of Central Missouri

== 2022 Woman of the Year Top-9 Finalists ==
- Zoe Baker, Colorado School of Mines
- Jaeda Daniel, North Carolina State University
- Brooke Forde, Stanford University
- Karenna Groff, Massachusetts Institute of Technology
- Macy Klein, St. Catherine University
- Erin Nicholas, Middlebury College
- Kayla Tennant, Queens University of Charlotte
- Hanna Thrainsdottir, Georgian Court University
- Victoria Tran, U.S. Naval Academy

== 2021 Woman of the Year Top-9 Finalists ==
- Mikayla Bisignani, Johns Hopkins University
- Anna Cockrell, University of Southern California
- Kendall Cornick, Augustana University
- Stefani Deschner, University of Notre Dame
- Naomi Hill, North Central College
- Alison Johnson, Adelphi University
- Eka Jose, Washington University in St. Louis
- Avery Skinner, University of Kentucky
- Irisa Ye, University of the Sciences

== 2020 Woman of the Year Top-9 Finalists ==
- Charlotte Luise Ahrens, Arizona State University
- Maddi Chitsey-Crisler, Lubbock Christian University
- DeAnna Hernandez, Texas Lutheran University
- Arielle Johnston, Salisbury University
- Annie McCullough, Tusculum University
- Emma Morgan-Bennett, Swarthmore College
- Mikayla Pivec, Oregon State University
- Asia Seidt, University of Kentucky
- Juah Toe, West Chester University

== 2019 Woman of the Year Top-9 Finalists ==
- Chelsea Abreu, Adelphi University
- Virginia Elena Carta, Duke University
- Monica Feeley, Vassar College
- Marin McCoy, Swarthmore College
- Angela Mercurio, University of Nebraska–Lincoln
- Hannah Orbach-Mandel, Kenyon College
- Krissy Ortiz, Lynn University
- Ginny Thrasher, West Virginia University
- Hailey Tucker, Southwestern Oklahoma State University

== 2018 Woman of the Year Top-9 Finalists ==
- Ade Ayoola, University of Chicago
- Trissy Fairweather, Claflin University
- Delaney Hiegert, Newman University
- Kayla Leland, Whitworth University
- Kami Norton, Angelo State University
- Keturah Orji, University of Georgia
- Sidney Peters., University of Minnesota
- Vanessa Shippy, Oklahoma State University
- Amelia Wilhelm, Bates College

== 2017 Woman of the Year Top-9 Finalists ==
- Sabrina Anderson, Slippery Rock University of Pennsylvania
- Serena Barr, Liberty University
- Jenny Carmichael, University of Oklahoma
- Eliana Crawford, Kenyon College
- Lizzy Crist, Washington University in St. Louis
- Karina Martinez, Texas A&M University
- Christina Melian, Stony Brook University
- Natalie O'Keefe, Southwest Baptist University
- Jayme Perez, East Texas Baptist University

== 2016 Woman of the Year Top-9 Finalists ==
- Margaret Guo, Massachusetts Institute of Technology
- Christina Hillman, Iowa State University
- Bri Leeper, West Texas A&M University
- Maurissa Lester, Limestone College
- Kara McCormack, University of Miami
- Elayna Siebert, Carson-Newman University
- Haley Townsend, Kenyon College
- Cameasha Turner, University of Texas
- Ami Viti, Misericordia University

== 2015 Woman of the Year Top-9 Finalists ==
- Supriya Davis, Swarthmore College
- Kristin Day, Clarion University of Pennsylvania
- Margo Geer, University of Arizona
- Kelsey Graham, Wheaton College
- Margaret MacPhail, DePauw University
- Colleen Quigley, Florida State University
- Zoe Scandalis, University of Southern California
- Taylor Skala, Rockhurst University
- Rebecka Surtevall, Arkansas Tech University

== 2014 Woman of the Year Top-9 Finalists ==
- Alexa Baltes, Illinois Wesleyan University
- Marisa Bast, Northwestern University
- Krista Bellefeuille, University of Northwestern – St. Paul
- Ellen Chambers, Lynn University
- Alyssa Hasslen, University of Arizona
- Megan Light, Emory University
- Jackie Sileo, Long Island University
- Elizabeth Tucker, University of Notre Dame
- Bailey Vrazel, Texas Woman's University

== 2013 Woman of the Year Top-9 Finalists ==
- Elena Crosley, Bowdoin College
- Elizabeth Duffy, Concordia University, St. Paul
- Kaaren Hatlen, Pacific Lutheran University
- Kelly Majam, University of Hawaiʻi at Mānoa
- Alexandra Maseko, Seton Hall University
- Ifeatu Okafor, Texas Tech University
- Kayla Shull, Clarion University of Pennsylvania
- Bridgett Soares, Long Island University
- Lya Swaner, East Texas Baptist University

== 2012 Woman of the Year Top-9 Finalists ==
- Hillary Bach, Arizona State University
- Grace Collins, Barry University
- Kate Griewisch, Lenoir-Rhyne University
- Kelsey Kittleson, Luther College
- Sarah Jane Otey, U.S. Coast Guard Academy
- Brooke Pancake, University of Alabama
- Alexi Pappas, Dartmouth College
- Elizabeth Phillips, Washington University in St. Louis
- Verena Preikschas, California State University

== 2011 Woman of the Year Top-9 Finalists ==
- Laura Barito, Stevens Institute of Technology
- Danielle Blair, University of Alabama
- Michaela Calnan, Bowdoin College
- Annie Chandler, University of Arizona
- Hewenfei Elwen Li, Brigham Young University
- Hayley Emerick, Trinity University
- Victoria Hansen, West Liberty University
- Grace Johnson, University of Georgia
- Kelsey Ward, Drury University

== 2010 Woman of the Year Top-9 Finalists ==
- Hannah Baker, Wartburg College
- Lisa Koll, Iowa State University
- Melissa Mackley, Gustavus Adolphus College
- Lyndsay McBride, University of Indianapolis
- Brittany Rogers, University of Alabama
- Justine Schluntz, University of Arizona
- Mary Slinger, Concordia University
- Natalja Stanski, Grand Valley State University
- Ruth Westby, Emory University

== See also ==
- List of sports awards honoring women
- NCAA Sportsmanship Award (student-athletes who have demonstrated one or more of the ideals of sportsmanship)
- Today's Top 10 Award (NCAA) (outstanding senior student-athletes)
- Walter Byers Scholarship (NCAA) (top male and female scholar-athletes)
- Silver Anniversary Awards (NCAA) (former student-athletes)
- Lowe's Senior CLASS Award
- Best Female College Athlete ESPY Award
- Best Male College Athlete ESPY Award
- Athlete of the Year
