= Alexandra Turvey =

Canadian swimmer (born 2003)

Personal information
- Nationality: Canadian

Sport
- Sport: Swimming

Alexandra Turvey (born 2003, Vancouver, Canada) is a Canadian swimmer who was named NCAA Woman of the Year in 2024 by the National Collegiate Athletic Association.

Swimming since she was eight years old, she attended York House School, where she became the High School Provincial Champion in the 50m Freestyle and 100m Butterfly and held the British Columbia High School Provincial Record in the 50m Freestyle. She was selected for the British Columbia team in the 2017 Canada Summer Games, a youth competition, winning three medals including gold in the Women's 4 × 200m freestyle relay.

Turvey studied at Pomona College, in Claremont, California, and graduated with a degree in biology. She then enrolled in an eight-year joint Harvard - MIT MD-PhD double postgraduate program.

While at Pomona, she competed in three NCAA Division III Championships, earned 21 CSCAA All-American swimming honors, set eight Southern California Intercollegiate Athletic Conference (SCIAC) records, and was honored three times as SCIAC Woman of the Year. She won the NCAA Division III Elite 90 award in 2023, which is given to the competing athlete with the highest grade point average.

Turvey was a member of five NCAA Division III Championship relays. At the 2024 Championships while representing Pomona-Pitzer, she swam on the winning 200 and 400-yard freestyle relays. In 2025, Turvey competed for the MIT Engineers. At the 2025 Championships, she swam on the winning 200 and 400-yard freestyle relays, as well as the 400-yard medley relay. Turvey contributed 38 individual points to the Engineers' first team title.

== Awards and honors ==
- 2024 NCAA Woman of the Year Award
