= Kayla Han =

American swimmer

Personal information
- Full name: Kayla Han
- Nickname: Han
- National team: United States
- Born: May 31, 2008 (age 18) Brea, California, United States

Sport
- Sport: Swimming
- Strokes: Freestyle, individual medley, butterfly
- Club: La Mirada Armada
Medal record
Women's swimming
Representing United States
| Event | 1st | 2nd | 3rd |
|---|---|---|---|
| World Championships (LC) | 0 | 0 | 1 |
| World Junior Championships | 1 | 1 | 0 |
| Junior Pan Pac Championships | 1 | 1 | 0 |
| Total | 2 | 2 | 1 |
World Championships (LC)
| Bronze medal – third place | 2024 Doha | 4×100 m mixed freestyle |
World Junior Championships
| Gold medal – first place | 2023 Netanya | 800 m freestyle |
| Silver medal – second place | 2025 Otopeni | 4×200 m freestyle |
Junior Pan Pac Championships
| Gold medal – first place | 2024 Canberra | 800 m freestyle |
| Silver medal – second place | 2022 Honolulu | 400 m medley |

Kayla Han (born May 31, 2008) is an American competitive swimmer specializing in freestyle and individual medley events. She is a 800 m freestyle Champion in 2023 World Junior Championships. In 2022 Junior Pan Pacific Championships, she won silver medalist in the 400-meter individual medley. At the 2021 U.S. Open Championships, Han achieved a fourth-place finish in the 400-meter individual medley and placed seventh in the 800-meter freestyle. She won the B-final of the 400-meter individual medley in Wave I of the 2020 USA Swimming Olympic Trials where she was the youngest swimmer to compete at 13 years of age. A video of the race posted by NBC Sports on YouTube became the most viewed video from the year's Olympic trials.

== Early life ==
Han was born May 31, 2008, in Brea, California. She competes for the La Mirada Armada Swim Club.

== Swimming career ==
=== 2018—2020 ===
Over the course of 2018 and 2019, Han accumulated six USA Swimming national age group records for the girls 10 and under age group. Her first record was in the 200-yard individual medley in December 2018 with a time of 2:13.33. The next four records she accumulated over the months of January, February, and March in 2019, earning three more records in the 200-yard individual medley as well as one record in the 500-yard freestyle. She culminated her record breaking streak in May 2019 by achieving her first national age group record in long course meters in the 200-meter individual medley with a time of 2:28.70. Her accomplishments as a 10 year old were noticed by Swimming World and SwimSwam, with Swimming World giving her their "Up & Comers" honor for the month of June 2019 and SwimSwam awarding her the female Age Group Swimmer of the Year Swammy Award for the 2019 year. Further performances in 2020 that put her at the top of her age group, then the 11—12 year old age group, in multiple events though not yet breaking age group records received additional recognition from SwimSwam, who awarded her the Swammy Award for the female Age Group Swimmer of the Year for 11—12 year olds for 2020.

=== 2021: US Olympic Trials B-final winner at 13 years of age ===
==== 2021 CA Speedo Grand Challenge ====
At the 2021 California Speedo Grand Challenge in Irvine, California, in May 2021, Han set three additional national age group records, this time for the girls 11—12 age group and over the span of one weekend. On the first day of competition, 28 May, Han broke the 400-meter freestyle national age group record set by Claire Tuggle with a time of 4:17.65. The following day, Han broke a second national age group record. She swam a 4:50.70 to break the 400-meter individual medley record set by Elizabeth Beisel in 2005 by over 4 seconds and qualify for the 2020 US Olympic Trials. The third day of competition, 30 May, Han broke a third national age group record. This time she broke the 800-meter freestyle record set by Isabella Rongione in 2012. Han's time of 8:50.58 was almost 5 seconds faster than the previous record.

==== 2020 US Olympic Trials ====
NBC Sports official video: Han wins 400m IM B-final

Han was the youngest swimmer to qualify for the 2020 USA Swimming Olympic Trials, held in Omaha, Nebraska, and postponed to June 2021 due to the COVID-19 pandemic, at 12 years of age.

In the Wave I preliminary heats of the 400-meter individual medley, on June 5, Han swam a 4:56.66 and advanced to the B-final. She won the B-final later in the day with a time of 4:51.08 at 13 years, 5 days of age and did not advance to Wave II of the Olympic Trials. NBC Sports posted a video clip of Han's win on its YouTube channel. The clip turned out to be the most watched video clip from the 2020 US Olympic Team Trials in swimming on YouTube with over 940,000 views, beating out clips of swimmers who had previously competed in Olympic Games and won multiple Olympic gold medals including Simone Manuel, Katie Ledecky, and Caeleb Dressel. By August 2022, the video had garnered over 1.2 million views and remained the most watched clip from the trials.

Her performances leading up to and at the 2020 Olympic Trials were noted by Swimming World who, in July 2021, gave her their "Up & Comers" age group swimmer of the month honor for her achievements.

==== 2021 Speedo Summer Championships ====
At the 2021 West Speedo Summer Championships in Irvine, California, in August, Han set personal best times in a number of events including the 400-meter freestyle where she swam a 4:14.52 and ranked as the third fastest female American 13 years of age to swim the race in history.

On day one of competition, August 3, Han took fourth place with a time of 8:50.59 in the 800-meter freestyle. The following morning, on day two of competition, Han swam a personal best time of 2:03.23 in the 200-meter freestyle prelims and advanced to the championship final of the event ranked fifth overall. In the championship final, Han placed eighth with a time of 2:03.44.

Day three, Han lowered her best time in the 400-meter individual medley two times, first to a 4:50.65 in the prelims where she placed third, then to a 4:49.73 in the championship final where she placed fifth and was the only swimmer under 14 years of age competing. Her swims moved her to the #22 position for 13—14 year old female American swimmers all-time. She also lowered her personal best time in the 400-meter freestyle, swimming a 4:14.52 in the championship final, taking second place in the event where she was the only swimmer under 16 years of age to advance to the championship final, and dropping over two seconds off her previous best time.

Her fifth and final day of competition, Han competed every day of the championships, Han placed fifth in the 1500-meter freestyle with a time of 16:55.32, which was a little slower than the personal best time of 16:52.75 she swam at a 2021 Summer Sectional swim meet in Roseville, California, in July.

==== 2021 U.S. Open Championships ====
For the 2021 U.S. Open Championships, Han entered to compete in six individual events in the pre-scratch stage of lead-up to the start of competition on December 1. Han was noted as someone to watch in one of four events of the meet highlighted in advance of competition by SwimSwam, specifically the 800-meter freestyle. In the 800-meter freestyle, Han placed seventh overall with a personal best time of 8:46.18, dropping 4.4 seconds from her previous best time of 8:50.58 swum in May and finishing over 30 seconds behinds gold medalist Katie Ledecky. Han finished second in the b-final, second-fastest final, of the 400-meter freestyle in 4:15.74. In the fastest final heat, called the a-final, of the 400-meter individual medley on the third day of competition, Han placed fourth with a personal best time of 4:47.92 in the event, finishing less than 10 seconds behind the gold medalist Leah Smith. Later in the same finals session, she placed sixth with a time of 2:04.28 in the b-final of the 200-meter freestyle. On the fourth and final day of competition, Han qualified for the c-final of the 200-meter butterfly with a time of 2:19.14 in the prelims heats and placed first with a time of 16:43.02 in the slowest heat of the 1500-meter freestyle, where she dropped almost 10 full seconds from her previous best time. In her last final of the Championships, Han was bumped up to the b-final in the 200-meter butterfly, after Hana Shimizu-Bowers decided to forgo competing, where she placed fifth with a personal best time of 2:16.80, which was less than seven seconds slower than the time of 2:10.58 swum by the gold medalist Regan Smith.

=== 2022: Junior Pan Pacific medalist at 14 years of age ===
In January 2022, Han swam personal best times at the Road to 2022 Senior Invitational in La Mirada, a meet held leading up to various World Championships in 2022 such as the 2022 World Junior Championships to be held in 2022 due to the COVID-19 pandemic, including a 8:43.88 in the 800-meter freestyle, a 16:37.59 in the 1500-meter freestyle, a 2:16.68 in the 200-meter butterfly, and a 2:17.98 in the 200-meter individual medley. In April, she swam best times in the 400-meter individual medley, a 4:46.01 that ranked as the fastest all-time for 13-year-old American girls, and the 200-meter freestyle, a 2:02.17, at the 2022 Fran Crippen Swim Meet of Champions. She also won the 800-meter freestyle in a personal best time of 8:42.15 and achieved a personal best time with a 2:17.62 in the 200-meter individual medley preliminary heats. Earlier in the meet, she swam a personal best time of 58.35 seconds in the 100-meter freestyle and 4:13.24 in the 400-meter freestyle.

==== 2022 International Team Trials ====
In the 800-meter freestyle on the first day of the 2022 US International Team Trials in Greensboro, North Carolina, in late April, Han placed fifth in the slowest heats with a personal best time of 8:41.02. Two days later, she qualified for the b-final of the 400-meter individual medley, swimming a 4:49.97 in the prelims heats to rank tenth overall. She won the b-final with a personal best time of 4:44.63. On the fourth day, she ranked 17th in the prelims heats of the 400-meter freestyle with a 4:15.86 and qualified for the c-final. She was bumped into the b-final in the evening finals session, where she placed fourth, twelfth overall, with a personal best time of 4:13.22. In her final event, the 1500-meter freestyle on day five, she placed third in the slowest heats with a personal best time of 16:36.60.

==== 2022 Junior Pan Pacific Championships ====
2022 Junior Pan Pac Championships
| Silver medal – second place | 400 m individual medley | 4:43.60 (pb) |

In May 2022, Han was named to the United States roster by USA Swimming for the 2022 Junior Pan Pacific Swimming Championships in the 1500-meter freestyle and the 400-meter individual medley based on her performances at the 2022 US International Team Trials. She was one of four female swimmers named to the roster in individual medley events along with Teagan O'Dell, Julia Podkościelny, and Emily Thompson. On the first day of competition at Veterans Memorial Aquatic Center in Honolulu, she achieved a personal best time of 8:35.85 in the 800-meter freestyle and ranked ninth overall when the results from the slowest and fastest heats were merged. Day two, she finished second in the third preliminary heat of the 400-meter individual medley with a time of 4:46.99, ranked second across all prelims heats, and qualified for the final. In the evening, she finished in a personal best time of 4:43.60 behind Mio Narita of Japan to win the silver medal at 14 years, 86 days of age. The following day, she placed 19th in the 400-meter freestyle with a time of 4:14.17 and day four of four, she ranked seventh out of all heats in the 1500-meter freestyle with a time of 16:43.13.

==== End of the year Championships ====
At the 2022 Kevin B. Perry Senior Meet, held in November in La Mirada, Han achieved a National Age Group record for the girls 13–14 age group in the 400-yard individual medley with a personal best time of 4:06.95, which lowered the former record set in 2004 by Katie Hoff by 1.49 seconds. On the second day of the 2022 Winter Junior US National Championships edition West, in December, she placed sixth in the 500-yard freestyle with a time of 4:44.64. The third day, she placed third in the 400-yard individual medley with a time of 4:07.77 followed up by a twenty-third place in the 200-yard freestyle with a 1:49.19. For the 1650-yard freestyle on the fourth and final day, she placed third with a personal best time of 16:05.75 and was the only swimmer under 15 years of age to place in the top three for the event, finishing behind 16-year-old Katie Grimes and 15-year-old Claire Weinstein. Later in the same session, she placed second in the 200-yard butterfly b-final with a time of 1:58.09.

=== 2023 ===
At the 2023 Speedo Sectionals in March and conducted in long course meters at the Indiana University Natatorium in Indianapolis, Indiana, Han won four individual events including the 400 meter freestyle with a personal best time of 4:11.34 and the 1500 meter freestyle with a personal best time of 16:26.92. Nearing her 15th birthday two months later, 14-year-old Han achieved four personal best times at the 2023 TYR Pro Swim Series in Mission Viejo, California: a 4:10.56 in the 400 meter freestyle, a 4:42.96 in the 400 meter individual medley, a 8:32.88 in the 800 meter freestyle, and a 2:16.29 in the 200 meter individual medley.

== International championships ==
| Meet | 200 freestyle | 400 freestyle | 800 freestyle | 1500 freestyle | 200 butterfly | 400 individual medley |
|---|---|---|---|---|---|---|
| USOC 2021 (age: 13) | 6th (b) (2:04.28) | 2nd (b) (4:15.74) | 7th (8:46.18) | 1st (h) (16:43.02) | 5th (b) (2:16.80) | 4th (4:47.92) |
| PACJ 2022 (age: 14) | | 19th (4:14.17) | 9th (8:35.85) | 7th (16:43.13) | | (silver) (4:43.60) |

== Personal best times ==
=== Long course meters (50 m pool) ===
| Event | Time | | Meet | Location | Date | Age | Ref |
|---|---|---|---|---|---|---|---|
| 100 m freestyle | 58.35 | h | 2022 Fran Crippen Swim Meet of Champions | Mission Viejo, California | April 1, 2022 | 13 | |
| 200 m freestyle | 2:02.17 | | 2022 Fran Crippen Swim Meet of Champions | Mission Viejo, California | April 2, 2022 | 13 | |
| 400 m freestyle | 4:08.21 | | 2024 U.S. Olympic Trials - Indianapolis | Indianapolis, Indiana | June 15, 2024 | 14 | |
| 800 m freestyle | 8:32.88 | | 2023 TYR Pro Swim Series - Mission Viejo | Mission Viejo, California | May 20, 2023 | 14 | |
| 1500 m freestyle | 16:26.92 | | 2023 Speedo Sectionals - Indianapolis | Indianapolis, Indiana | March 26, 2023 | 14 | |
| 200 m butterfly | 2:16.68 | | Road to 2022 Senior Invitational | La Mirada, California | January 2022 | 13 | |
| 200 m individual medley | 2:16.29 | b | 2023 TYR Pro Swim Series - Mission Viejo | Mission Viejo, California | May 20, 2023 | 14 | |
| 400 m individual medley | 4:42.96 | | 2023 TYR Pro Swim Series - Mission Viejo | Mission Viejo, California | May 19, 2023 | 14 | |

Legend: h — prelims heat; b – b-final; exb – exhibition

=== Short course yards (25 yd pool) ===
| Event | Time | Meet | Location | Date | Age | Ref |
|---|---|---|---|---|---|---|
| 100 yd freestyle | 51.40 | 2022 Road to Paris Senior Invitational | La Mirada, California | January 15, 2023 | 14 | |
| 200 yd freestyle | 1:47.93 | 2022 Kevin B. Perry Senior Meet | La Mirada, California | November 5, 2022 | 14 | |
| 500 yd freestyle | 4:39.18 | 2022 Kevin B. Perry Senior Meet | La Mirada, California | November 4, 2022 | 14 | |
| 1000 yd freestyle | 9:41.77 | 2022 Kevin B. Perry Senior Meet | La Mirada, California | November 3, 2022 | 14 | |
| 1650 yd freestyle | 16:05.75 | 2022 Winter Junior US National Championships | Austin, Texas | December 10, 2022 | 14 | |
| 100 yd butterfly | 55.38 | 2021 CA/NV Speedo Sectionals | Huntington Beach, California | December 17, 2021 | 13 | |
| 200 yd individual medley | 2:00.16 | 2021 CA/NV Speedo Sectionals | Huntington Beach, California | December 17, 2021 | 13 | |
| 400 yd individual medley | 4:06.95 | 2022 Kevin B. Perry Senior Meet | La Mirada, California | November 5, 2022 | 14 | |

== National age group records ==
=== Long course meters (50 m pool) ===
| No. | Event | Time | Meet | Location | Date | Age | Age Group | Ref |
|---|---|---|---|---|---|---|---|---|
| 1 | 200 m individual medley | 2:28.70 | 2019 Speedo Grand Challenge | Irvine, California | May 26, 2019 | 10 years, 360 days | 10 & under | |
| 2 | 400 m freestyle | 4:17.65 | 2021 CA Speedo Grand Challenge | Irvine, California | May 28, 2021 | 12 years, 362 days | 11–12 | |
| 3 | 400 m individual medley | 4:50.70 | 2021 CA Speedo Grand Challenge | Irvine, California | May 29, 2021 | 12 years, 363 days | 11–12 | |
| 4 | 800 m freestyle | 8:50.58 | 2021 CA Speedo Grand Challenge | Irvine, California | May 30, 2021 | 12 years, 364 days | 11–12 | |

=== Short course yards (25 yd pool) ===
| No. | Event | Time | Meet | Location | Date | Age | Age Group | Ref |
|---|---|---|---|---|---|---|---|---|
| 1 | 200 yd individual medley | 2:13.33 | Winter Age Group Championships | Palm Springs, California | December 9, 2018 | 10 years, 192 days | 10 & under | |
| 2 | 500 yd freestyle | 5:13.45 | 2019 California MVN Senior Qualifier | Mission Viejo, California | January 19, 2019 | 10 years, 233 days | 10 & under | |
| 3 | 200 yd individual medley (2) | 2:13.01 | | | February 16, 2019 | 10 years, 261 days | 10 & under | |
| 4 | 200 yd individual medley (3) | 2:12.24 | | | March 17, 2019 | 10 years, 290 days | 10 & under | |
| 5 | 200 yd individual medley (4) | 2:11.99 | | | March 17, 2019 | 10 years, 290 days | 10 & under | |
| 6 | 400 yd individual medley | 4:06.95 | 2022 Kevin B. Perry Senior Meet | La Mirada, California | November 5, 2022 | 14 years, 158 days | 13–14 | |

== Awards and honors ==
- Swimming World Up & Comers, Age Group Swimmer of the Month: June 2019, July 2021
- SwimSwam, Weekly Wonders of Age Group Swimming: November 12, 2021
- Arena, Swim of the Week: January 21, 2022
- SwimSwam Swammy Award, Age Group Swimmer of the Year 13–14 (female): 2022
- SwimSwam Swammy Award, Age Group Swimmer of the Year 11–12 (female): 2020, 2021
- SwimSwam Swammy Award, Age Group Swimmer of the Year 10 & under (female): 2019

== See also ==
- 2008 in the United States
- 2020 United States Olympic Trials (swimming)
- 2024 United States Olympic Trials (swimming)
