= 2024 World Aquatics Swimming Championships (25 m) – Women's 200 metre freestyle =

Swimming competition

Women's 200 metre freestyle at the 2024 World Aquatics Swimming Championships (25 m)
- Venue: Duna Arena
- Location: Budapest, Hungary
- Dates: 15 December (heats and final)
- Competitors: 40 from 33 nations
- Winning time: 1:50.62

Medalists
gold medal	Siobhán Haughey	Hong Kong
silver medal	Mary-Sophie Harvey	Canada
bronze medal	Claire Weinstein	United States

The women's 200 metre freestyle event at the 2024 World Aquatics Swimming Championships (25 m) was held on 15 December 2024 at the Duna Arena in Budapest, Hungary.

== Records ==
Prior to the competition, the existing world and championship records were as follows.

World record	Siobhán Haughey (HKG)	1:50.31	Abu Dhabi, United Arab Emirates	16 December 2021
Competition record	Siobhán Haughey (HKG)	1:50.31	Abu Dhabi, United Arab Emirates	16 December 2021

== Results ==
=== Heats ===
The heats were started at 09:02.

Rank	Heat	Lane	Name	Nationality	Time	Notes
1	3	3	Claire Weinstein	United States	1:52.51	Q
2	5	5	Mary-Sophie Harvey	Canada	1:52.81	Q
3	3	4	Lani Pallister	Australia	1:53.01	Q
4	3	5	Leah Neale	Australia	1:53.48	Q
5	5	4	Siobhán Haughey	Hong Kong	1:53.76	Q
6	4	7	Paige Madden	United States	1:53.94	Q
7	4	4	Freya Anderson	Great Britain	1:53.99	Q
8	5	3	Sofia Morini	Italy	1:54.29	Q
9	5	6	Giulia D'Innocenzo	Italy	1:54.41	R
10	4	1	Lilla Minna Ábrahám	Hungary	1:54.46	R
11	5	2	Daria Klepikova	Neutral Athletes B	1:54.65	
12	4	5	Nikolett Pádár	Hungary	1:54.84	
13	3	6	Maria Fernanda Costa	Brazil	1:55.00	
14	4	3	Snæfríður Jórunnardóttir	Iceland	1:55.48	
15	5	8	Nicole Maier	Germany	1:55.75	
16	4	6	Gong Zhenqi	China	1:56.81	
17	3	8	Sofia Åstedt	Sweden	1:56.83	
18	2	6	Gan Ching Hwee	Singapore	1:56.85	NR
19	4	8	María Daza	Spain	1:57.19	
20	5	1	Wiktoria Guść	Poland	1:57.38	
21	3	1	Julia Mrozinski	Germany	1:57.60	
22	4	2	Daria Trofimova	Neutral Athletes B	1:57.94	
23	3	0	Francisca Martins	Portugal	1:58.01	
24	3	2	Kong Yaqi	China	1:58.28	
25	2	4	Smiltė Plytnykaitė	Lithuania	1:59.43	
26	4	9	Tiffany Murillo	Colombia	1:59.96	
27	2	2	Iman Avdić	Bosnia and Herzegovina	2:00.10	
28	2	3	Andrea Becali	Cuba	2:00.26	
29	2	5	Jesse Welsh	New Zealand	2:01.61	
30	5	9	Zehra Bilgin	Turkey	2:01.86	
31	2	7	Logan Watson-Brown	Bermuda	2:04.48	
32	2	8	Paige van der Westhuizen	Zimbabwe	2:04.89	
33	2	0	Sara Jankovikj	North Macedonia	2:05.10	
34	1	5	Jehanara Nabi	Pakistan	2:06.27	NR
35	2	1	Keisy Castro	Costa Rica	2:07.10	
36	2	9	Maria Lopes Freitas	Angola	2:09.58	
37	1	6	Aiymkyz Aidaralieva	Kyrgyzstan	2:09.89	
38	1	3	Duana Lama	Nepal	2:11.08	
39	1	4	Riga Shala	Kosovo	2:12.27	
40	1	2	Valentina Howell	Panama	2:12.54	
	3	7	Abbie Wood	Great Britain	Did not start	
	3	9	Laura Lahtinen	Finland	Did not start	
	5	0	Iris Julia Berger	Austria	Did not start	
	5	7	Janja Šegel	Slovenia	Did not start	

=== Final ===
The final was held at 18:26.

Rank	Lane	Name	Nationality	Time	Notes
1st place, gold medalist(s)	2	Siobhán Haughey	Hong Kong	1:50.62	
2nd place, silver medalist(s)	5	Mary-Sophie Harvey	Canada	1:51.49	AM
3rd place, bronze medalist(s)	4	Claire Weinstein	United States	1:51.62	WJ
4	3	Lani Pallister	Australia	1:51.75	
5	1	Freya Anderson	Great Britain	1:52.14	
6	7	Paige Madden	United States	1:52.93	
7	6	Leah Neale	Australia	1:53.21	
8	8	Sofia Morini	Italy	1:54.17	
