= 2024 World Aquatics Swimming Championships (25 m) – Women's 4 × 200 metre freestyle relay =

Swimming competition

Women's 4 × 200 metre freestyle relay at the 2024 World Aquatics Swimming Championships (25 m)
- Venue: Duna Arena
- Location: Budapest, Hungary
- Dates: 12 December (heats and final)
- Competitors: 44 from 10 nations
- Teams: 10
- Winning time: 7:30.13 WR

Medalists
gold medal	Alex Walsh; Paige Madden; Katie Grimes; Claire Weinstein; Phoebe Bacon; Lilla Bognar	United States
silver medal	Nikolett Pádár; Panna Ugrai; Dóra Molnár; Lilla Minna Ábrahám	Hungary
bronze medal	Leah Neale; Elizabeth Dekkers; Milla Jansen; Lani Pallister; Tara Kinder	Australia

The women's 4 × 200 metre freestyle relay event at the 2024 World Aquatics Swimming Championships (25 m) was held on 12 December 2024 at the Duna Arena in Budapest, Hungary.

== Records ==
Prior to the competition, the existing world and championship records were as follows.

World record	Australia (AUS)	7:30.87	Melbourne, Australia	14 December 2022
Competition record	Australia (AUS)	7:30.87	Melbourne, Australia	14 December 2022

The following new records were set during this competition:

Date	Event	Name	Nation	Time	Record
12 December	Final	Alex Walsh (1:53.25); Paige Madden (1:53.18); Katie Grimes (1:53.39); Claire Weinstein (1:50.31)	United States	7:30.13	WR, CR

== Results ==
=== Heats ===
The heats were started at 11:03.

Rank	Heat	Lane	Nation	Swimmers	Time	Notes
1	1	4	United States	Katie Grimes (1:54.98); Phoebe Bacon (1:54.52); Lilla Bognar (1:57.44); Claire Weinstein (1:53.10)	7:40.04	Q
2	1	7	Neutral Athletes B	Daria Trofimova (1:54.78); Kseniia Misharina (1:55.85); Milana Stepanova (1:54.57); Sofia Diakova (1:56.16)	7:41.36	Q
3	1	3	Italy	Sofia Morini (1:55.90); Giulia D'Innocenzo (1:54.19); Matilde Biagiotti (1:55.81); Anna Chiara Mascolo (1:55.56)	7:41.46	Q, NR
4	2	6	Germany	Isabel Gose (1:55.89); Julia Mrozinski (1:55.78); Nicole Maier (1:55.76); Nele Schulze (1:54.22)	7:41.65	Q, NR
5	2	4	Australia	Leah Neale (1:54.62); Lani Pallister (1:53.56); Milla Jansen (1:58.31); Tara Kinder (1:55.27)	7:41.76	Q
6	1	5	Hungary	Lilla Minna Ábrahám (1:55.98); Panna Ugrai (1:55.95); Dóra Molnár (1:56.90); Nikolett Pádár (1:54.77)	7:43.60	Q
7	2	5	China	Gong Zhenqi (1:56.92); Kong Yaqi (1:55.27); Liu Shuhan (1:56.42); Zhang Jingyan (1:57.67)	7:46.28	Q
8	2	3	Brazil	Fernanda Celidonio (1:56.95); Maria Fernanda Costa (1:54.76); Gabrielle Roncatto (1:57.88); Leticia Fassina Romão (1:58.38)	7:47.97	Q, SA
9	1	6	Japan	Miyu Namba (1:56.09); Yume Jinno (1:57.76); Misuzu Nagaoka (1:57.68); Ayami Suzuki (1:59.34)	7:50.87	R
10	2	7	South Africa	Hannah Robertson (2:00.12); Hannah Pearse (2:01.81); Stephanie Houtman (2:03.08); Milla Drakopoulos (2:01.01)	8:06.02	R
	1	2	Slovakia		Did not start	
	2	2	Hong Kong		Did not start	

=== Final ===
The final was held at 19:29.

Rank	Lane	Nation	Swimmers	Time	Notes
1st place, gold medalist(s)	4	United States	Alex Walsh (1:53.25); Paige Madden (1:53.18); Katie Grimes (1:53.39); Claire Weinstein (1:50.31)	7:30.13	WR
2nd place, silver medalist(s)	7	Hungary	Nikolett Pádár (1:52.81); Panna Ugrai (1:52.59); Dóra Molnár (1:55.39); Lilla Minna Ábrahám (1:52.60)	7:33.39	NR
3rd place, bronze medalist(s)	2	Australia	Leah Neale (1:52.79); Elizabeth Dekkers (1:54.96); Milla Jansen (1:54.01); Lani Pallister (1:51.84)	7:33.60	
4	5	Neutral Athletes B	Daria Trofimova (1:54.13); Milana Stepanova (1:53.94); Daria Klepikova (1:51.94); Kseniia Misharina (1:56.67)	7:36.68	
5	3	Italy	Giulia D'Innocenzo (1:54.49); Sofia Morini (1:53.88); Matilde Biagiotti (1:55.31); Anna Chiara Mascolo (1:56.60)	7:40.28	NR
6	6	Germany	Isabel Gose (1:56.18); Julia Mrozinski (1:56.51); Nicole Maier (1:53.95); Nele Schulze (1:55.94)	7:42.58	
7	1	China	Gong Zhenqi (1:55.58); Kong Yaqi (1:57.02); Liu Shuhan (1:56.41); Zhang Jingyan (1:57.19)	7:46.20	
8	8	Brazil	Maria Fernanda Costa (1:54.22) SA; Gabrielle Roncatto (1:57.34); Fernanda Celidonio (1:57.08); Leticia Fassina Romão (1:58.12)	7:46.76	SA
