= 2024 World Aquatics Swimming Championships (25 m) – Women's 800 metre freestyle =

Swimming competition

Women's 800 metre freestyle at the 2024 World Aquatics Swimming Championships (25 m)
- Venue: Duna Arena
- Location: Budapest, Hungary
- Dates: 11 December
- Competitors: 30 from 24 nations
- Winning time: 8:01.95 CR

Medalists
gold medal	Lani Pallister	Australia
silver medal	Isabel Gose	Germany
bronze medal	Katie Grimes	United States

The women's 800 metre freestyle event at the 2024 World Aquatics Swimming Championships (25 m) was held on 11 December 2024 at the Duna Arena in Budapest, Hungary.

== Records ==
Prior to the competition, the existing world and championship records were as follows.

World record	Katie Ledecky (USA)	7:57.42	Indianapolis, United States of America	5 November 2022
Competition record	Li Bingjie (CHN)	8:02.90	Abu Dhabi, United Arab Emirates	18 December 2021

The following record was established during the competition:

Date	Event	Name	Nationality	Time	Record
11 December	Heat 4	Lani Pallister	Australia	8:01.95	CR

== Results ==
The slowest heats were started at 10:35, and the fastest heat at 19:14.

In a post race interview, Pallister said "I didn’t... think I’d get emotional this meet" while reflecting on swimming a time she was happy with.

Rank	Heat	Lane	Name	Nationality	Time	Notes
1st place, gold medalist(s)	4	4	Lani Pallister	Australia	8:01.95	CR, NR
2nd place, silver medalist(s)	4	8	Isabel Gose	Germany	8:05.42	NR
3rd place, bronze medalist(s)	4	6	Katie Grimes	United States	8:05.90	
4	4	3	Paige Madden	United States	8:07.22	
5	4	2	Simona Quadarella	Italy	8:09.39	
6	4	5	Anastasiia Kirpichnikova	France	8:15.16	
7	3	4	Ajna Késely	Hungary	8:18.04	
8	2	6	Gan Ching Hwee	Singapore	8:18.85	NR
9	3	3	Sofia Diakova	Neutral Athletes B	8:18.93	
10	3	7	Eve Thomas	New Zealand	8:20.08	
11	4	1	Kseniia Misharina	Neutral Athletes B	8:20.81	
12	3	6	Amelie Blocksidge	Great Britain	8:21.47	
13	3	0	Gabrielle Roncatto	Brazil	8:22.45	
14	3	1	Vivien Jackl	Hungary	8:22.79	
15	4	7	Miyu Namba	Japan	8:23.66	
16	2	2	Artemis Vasilaki	Greece	8:27.23	NR
17	3	9	Liang Xiaolan	China	8:27.57	
18	3	5	Tiana Kritzinger	Australia	8:27.90	
19	2	4	Kong Yaqi	China	8:28.46	
20	3	2	Maria Fernanda Costa	Brazil	8:29.21	
21	2	8	Emma Finlin	Canada	8:29.96	
22	2	1	Stephanie Houtman	South Africa	8:30.32	
23	3	8	Deniz Ertan	Turkey	8:35.01	
24	2	0	Sasha Gatt	Malta	8:35.15	NR
25	2	5	Delfina Dini	Argentina	8:35.72	
26	2	3	Ada Hakkarainen	Finland	8:36.86	
27	2	7	Francisca Martins	Portugal	8:38.96	
28	1	4	Kyra Rabess	Cayman Islands	8:46.13	NR
29	1	3	Laura Benková	Slovakia	8:50.03	
30	1	5	Gilaine Ma	Hong Kong	8:58.06	
	2	9	Inana Soleman	Syria	Did not start	
