= Sandpipers of Nevada =

USA Swimming Club in Las Vegas

- Formation: 1968
- Headquarters: Las Vegas, Nevada
- Region served: Nevada
- Head Coach: Ron Aitken
- Affiliations: USA Swimming, Southern California Swimming
- Website: Sandpipers of Nevada

The Sandpipers of Nevada are a competitive swim team based in and around Las Vegas, Nevada. The team was founded in 1968, and offers training from a beginner level of swimming to a national level. The team currently competes in both regional meets held by Southern California Swimming and national meets held by USA Swimming.

== History ==
The team was started up in 1968, with around 20 swimmers originally joining the team.

In 1994, current head coach Ron Aitken would take over the head coach position. Since his leadership, the team has earned USA Swimming Gold Medal and Silver Medal Excellence awards, along with multiple Olympians that have represented Team USA, with the team being known for producing a litany of female endurance swimmers.

At the 2020 United States Olympic Trials, four swimmers from the Sandpipers would qualify to represent Team USA at the Olympics: Bowe Becker, Katie Grimes, Bella Sims, and Erica Sullivan.

== Achievements ==
As of November 1, 2023, the Sandpipers of Nevada have received the USA Swimming Podium Club Award in 2019 and 2022, USA Swimming Gold Medal Club Excellence Awards from 2016 to 2022, and USA Swimming Silver Medal Club Excellence Awards from 2009 to 2015.

Many Sandpiper swimmers have committed to top swimming programs, such as Luke Ellis to Indiana University, Claire Weinstein to the University of California, Berkeley, Dillon Wright to the University of Virginia, and Bella Sims to the University of Florida.

== Olympic swimmers ==
As of the 2020 Summer Olympics, the team has currently produced five Olympic swimmers.

- Bowe Becker: Competed in the 2020 Summer Olympics in the men's 4 × 100m freestyle relay. Along with Caeleb Dressel, Blake Pieroni, and Zach Apple, the relay team would win gold in the event.
- Katie Grimes: Competed in the 2020 Summer Olympics in the women's 800m freestyle, and was the youngest Team USA athlete at the 2020 Olympics, making her debut at 15-years old. She would place fourth overall in the event.
- Cody Miller: Competed in the 2016 Summer Olympics in two events, the men's 100m breaststroke and the breaststroke leg for the men's 4 × 100m freestyle relay. Miller won a bronze medal in the 100m breaststroke. Along with Ryan Murphy, Michael Phelps, and Nathan Adrian, he would win gold in the medley relay.
- Bella Sims: Competed in the 2020 Summer Olympics in the preliminary heats of the women's 4 × 200m freestyle relay.
- Erica Sullivan: Competed in the 2020 Summer Olympics in the women's 1500m freestyle, earning a silver medal.

At the 2024 Paris Olympics, the following are swimming:

- Claire Weinstein (born 2007), Olympic freestyle swimmer; won a silver medal.
