= Swimming at the 2022 World Aquatics Championships – Women's 4 × 200 metre freestyle relay =

Women's 4 × 200 metre freestyle relay at the 2022 World Aquatics Championships
- Venue: Danube Arena
- Location: Budapest, Hungary
- Dates: 22 June (heats and final)
- Competitors: 58 from 12 nations
- Teams: 12
- Winning time: 7:41.45

Medalists
gold medal	Claire Weinstein; Leah Smith; Katie Ledecky; Bella Sims; Alexandra Walsh; Hali Flickinger	United States
silver medal	Madison Wilson; Leah Neale; Kiah Melverton; Mollie O'Callaghan; Lani Pallister; Brianna Throssell	Australia
bronze medal	Summer McIntosh; Kayla Sanchez; Taylor Ruck; Penny Oleksiak; Mary-Sophie Harvey; Katerine Savard; Rebecca Smith	Canada

The Women's 4 × 200 metre freestyle relay competition at the 2022 World Aquatics Championships was held on 22 June 2022.

== Records ==
Prior to the competition, the existing world and championship records were as follows.

World record	China	7:40.33	Tokyo, Japan	29 July 2021
Competition record	Australia	7:41.50	Gwangju, South Korea	25 July 2019

The following new records were set during this competition.

Date	Event	Nation	Time	Record
22 June	Final	United States	7:41.45	CR

== Results ==
=== Heats ===
The heats were started at 10:11.

Rank	Heat	Lane	Nation	Swimmers	Time	Notes
1	2	5	Australia	Leah Neale (1:57.03); Lani Pallister (1:56.86); Brianna Throssell (1:57.23); Kiah Melverton (1:56.49)	7:47.61	Q
2	2	4	China	Li Bingjie (1:57.55); Lao Lihui (1:56.91); Ge Chutong (1:57.92); Ai Yanhan (1:56.70)	7:49.08	Q
3	1	4	United States	Alexandra Walsh (1:57.94); Claire Weinstein (1:58.35); Hali Flickinger (1:57.05); Bella Sims (1:55.91)	7:49.25	Q
4	1	5	Canada	Mary-Sophie Harvey (1:57.94); Katerine Savard (1:58.41); Rebecca Smith (1:59.03); Taylor Ruck (1:58.21)	7:53.59	Q
5	1	3	Hungary	Zsuzsanna Jakabos (2:00.25); Nikolett Pádár (1:57.48); Ajna Késely (1:59.37); Dóra Molnár (1:59.42)	7:56.52	Q
6	1	6	Brazil	Stephanie Balduccini (1:58.64); Giovanna Diamante (1:59.57); Aline Rodrigues (2:00.31); Maria Paula Heitmann (1:59.41)	7:57.93	Q
7	2	6	Japan	Momoka Yoshii (2:01.50); Miyu Namba (1:57.31); Aoi Masuda (1:59.97); Waka Kobori (1:59.89)	7:58.67	Q
8	2	3	Great Britain	Freya Anderson (1:59.96); Medi Harris (2:01.91); Freya Colbert (1:59.24); Lucy Hope (1:58.76)	7:59.87	Q, WD
9	1	2	New Zealand	Erika Fairweather (1:58.88); Eve Thomas (2:00.00); Caitlin Deans (2:03.42); Laura Littlejohn (2:02.57)	8:04.87	Q
10	2	7	Austria	Marlene Kahler (2:01.28); Cornelia Pammer (2:02.23); Lena Kreundl (2:01.16); Lena Opatril (2:03.18)	8:07.85	
11	2	2	Israel	Lea Polonsky (2:02.62); Anastasia Gorbenko (1:59.88); Aviv Barzelay (2:04.50); Daria Golovaty (2:01.20)	8:08.20	
12	1	7	South Korea	Kim Seo-yeong (1:59.65); Jung Hyun-young (2:04.39); Hur Yeon-kyung (2:06.41); Jo Hyun-ju (2:02.55)	8:13.00	

=== Final ===
The final was held at 19:50.

Rank	Lane	Nation	Swimmers	Time	Notes
1st place, gold medalist(s)	3	United States	Claire Weinstein (1:56.71); Leah Smith (1:56.47); Katie Ledecky (1:53.67); Bella Sims (1:54.60)	7:41.45	CR
2nd place, silver medalist(s)	4	Australia	Madison Wilson (1:56.74); Leah Neale (1:55.27); Kiah Melverton (1:55.91); Mollie O'Callaghan (1:55.94)	7:43.86	
3rd place, bronze medalist(s)	6	Canada	Summer McIntosh (1:54.79) WJ; Kayla Sanchez (1:57.39); Taylor Ruck (1:56.75); Penny Oleksiak (1:55.83)	7:44.76	
4	5	China	Tang Muhan (1:58.10); Li Bingjie (1:56.67); Ai Yanhan (1:56.77); Yang Junxuan (1:54.18)	7:45.72	
5	2	Hungary	Nikolett Pádár (1:58.01); Dóra Molnár (1:59.76); Ajna Késely (1:59.69); Boglárka Kapás (2:00.44)	7:57.90	
6	7	Brazil	Stephanie Balduccini (1:59.00); Giovanna Diamante (1:59.37); Aline Rodrigues (2:00.43); Maria Paula Heitmann (1:59.58)	7:58.38	
7	8	New Zealand	Erika Fairweather (1:58.24); Eve Thomas (1:59.17); Caitlin Deans (2:01.57); Laura Littlejohn (2:00.10)	7:59.08	
8	1	Japan	Momoka Yoshii (2:01.67); Miyu Namba (1:58.52); Aoi Masuda (1:59.70); Waka Kobori (2:00.14)	8:00.03	
