= Swimming at the 2024 Summer Olympics – Women's 4 × 200-metre freestyle relay =

Women's 4 × 200-metre freestyle relay at the Games of the XXXIII Olympiad
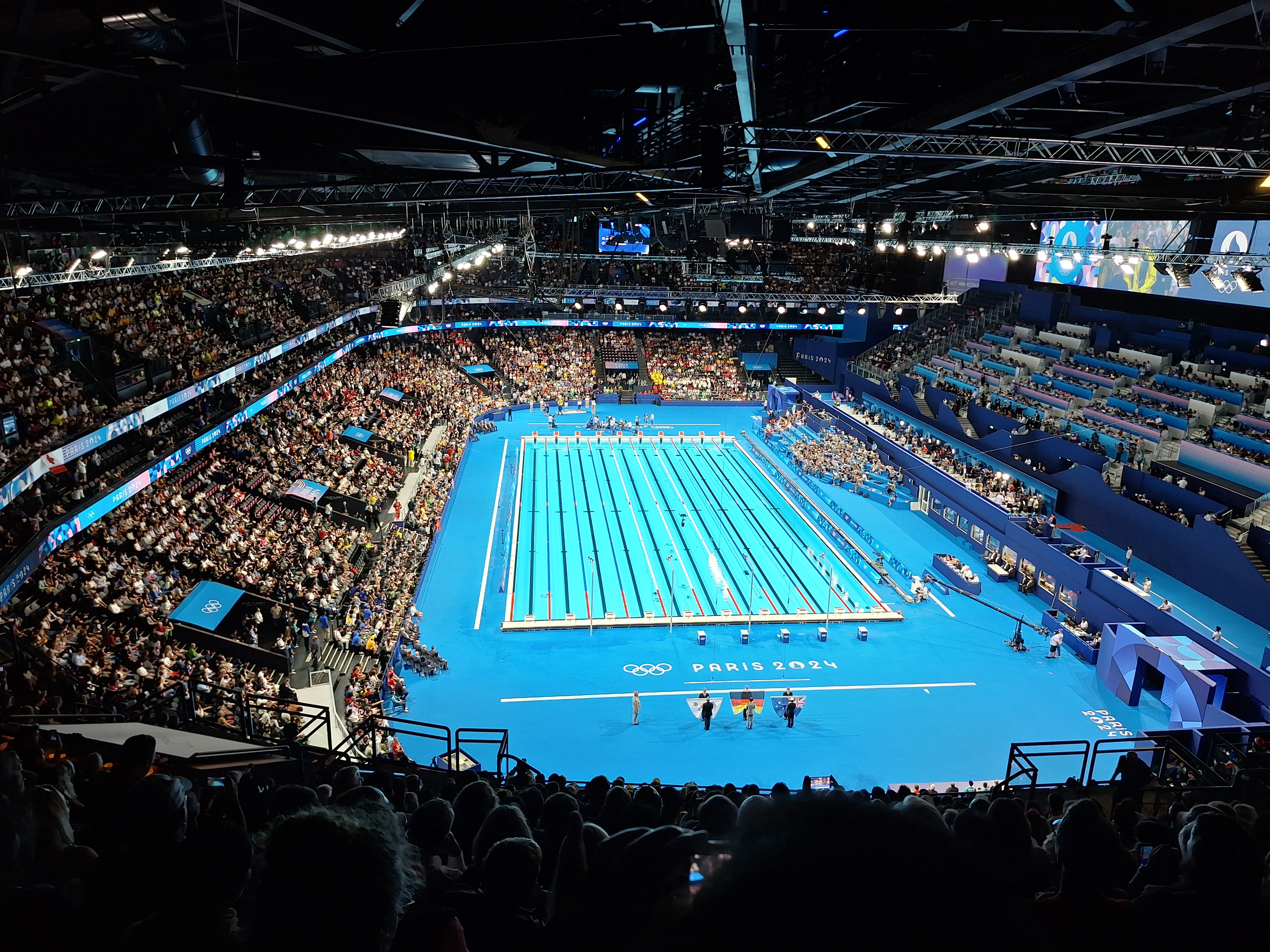
- Paris La Défense Arena after it was converted to a swimming pool for the swimming events
- Venue: Paris La Défense Arena
- Dates: 1 August 2024 (heats and final)
- Competitors: 73 from 16 nations
- Teams: 16 teams
- Winning time: 7:38.08 OR

Medalists
1st place, gold medalist(s)		Mollie O'Callaghan, Lani Pallister, Brianna Throssell, Ariarne Titmus, Jamie Perkins*, Shayna Jack*	Australia
2nd place, silver medalist(s)		Claire Weinstein, Paige Madden, Katie Ledecky, Erin Gemmell, Anna Peplowski*, Simone Manuel*, Alex Shackell*	United States
3rd place, bronze medalist(s)		Yang Junxuan, Li Bingjie, Ge Chutong, Liu Yaxin, Tang Muhan*, Kong Yaqi* *Indicates the swimmer only competed in the preliminary heats.	China

The women's 4 × 200-metre freestyle relay event at the 2024 Summer Olympics was held on 1 August 2024 at Paris La Défense Arena, which was converted to a swimming pool for the swimming events.

Australia were considered by SwimSwam and Swimming World to be the most likely to win the event, with SwimSwam opining that the United States, China and Canada were racing for second place. All four of those teams advanced to the final. In the final, Australia led from beginning to end to win with a new Olympic record of 7:38.08, the US won silver with 7:40.86 and China won bronze with 7:42.34. As part of the US' relay team, Katie Ledecky won her thirteenth Olympic medal, which was the most Olympic medals ever won by an American female in any event.

== Background ==
Team China won the event at the previous Olympics, while Australia won the event at the 2023 World Championships with a world record of 7:37.50. SwimSwam opined that "Australia practically has this race in the bag" due to their recent world record and due to having the top two fastest swimmers in the world in the event — Mollie O'Callaghan and Ariarne Titmus. The United States won silver at the 2023 World Championships and 2020 Olympics, and China had held the world record in the event in 2021.

SwimSwam wrote that the US, China and Canada were racing for second place, predicting Australia would win, China would come second and the US would come third. Swimming World also predicted Australia would win, but predicted that the US would come second and Canada would come third.

The event was held at Paris La Défense Arena, which was converted to a swimming pool for the swimming events.

== Qualification ==
Each National Olympic Committee could enter one team, and there were a total of sixteen qualifications places available. The first three qualifying places were taken by the top three finishers at the 2023 World Championships, and the final thirteen qualifying places were allocated to the fastest performances at the 2023 and 2024 World Championships.

== Heats ==
Two heats (preliminary rounds) took place on 1 August 2024, starting at 12:05. (Note: All times are Central European Summer Time (UTC+2)) The teams with the best eight times in the heats advanced to the final. The United States won the first heat with the fourth fastest qualifying time of 7:52.72, while Australia won the second heat with the fastest qualifying time of 7:45.63, which was the fastest qualifying time by over six seconds. Hungary, China, Brazil, Canada, Great Britain and New Zealand also all qualified.

Results
Rank	Heat	Lane	Team	Swimmers	Times	Notes
1	2	4	Australia	Lani Pallister (1:55.74); Jamie Perkins (1:56.78); Brianna Throssell (1:55.82); Shayna Jack (1:57.29)	7:45.63	Q
2	2	2	Hungary	Nikolett Pádár (1:57.82); Lilla Minna Ábrahám (1:57.48); Ajna Késely (1:58.97); Panna Ugrai (1:57.98)	7:52.25	Q
3	2	5	China	Tang Muhan (1:59.31); Kong Yaqi (1:59.33); Ge Chutong (1:57.88); Liu Yaxin (1:55.84)	7:52.36	Q
4	1	4	United States	Anna Peplowski (1:57.98); Erin Gemmell (1:56.77); Simone Manuel (1:58.50); Alex Shackell (1:59.47)	7:52.72	Q
5	1	3	Brazil	Maria Fernanda Costa (1:56.89); Stephanie Balduccini (1:57.93); Maria Paula Heitmann (1:59.43); Gabrielle Roncatto (1:58.56)	7:52.81	Q
6	2	3	Canada	Emma O'Croinin (2:00.27); Ella Jansen (1:58.25); Julie Brousseau (1:57.93); Mary-Sophie Harvey (1:56.58)	7:53.03	Q
7	1	5	Great Britain	Freya Anderson (1:57.31); Abbie Wood (1:57.15); Lucy Hope (1:59.29); Medi Harris (1:59.74)	7:53.49	Q
8	1	6	New Zealand	Erika Fairweather (1:56.04); Eve Thomas (1:59.29); Caitlin Deans (1:59.11); Laticia-Leigh Transom (1:59.93)	7:54.37	Q
9	2	1	Italy	Sofia Morini (1:58.26); Giulia D'Innocenzo (1:58.43); Matilde Biagiotti (1:59.23); Giulia Ramatelli (1:59.37)	7:55.29	
10	1	1	Germany	Isabel Gose (1:58.63); Nicole Maier (1:58.76); Julia Mrozinski (1:59.64); Nele Schulze (1:58.54)	7:55.57	
11	2	7	Israel	Anastasia Gorbenko (1:58.30); Daria Golovaty (1:58.02); Ayla Spitz (2:01.02); Lea Polonsky (1:58.65)	7:55.99	
12	2	6	Netherlands	Janna van Kooten (1:59.86); Imani de Jong (2:00.74); Silke Holkenborg (2:00.19); Marrit Steenbergen (1:56.79)	7:57.58	
13	1	2	Japan	Nagisa Ikemoto (1:58.68); Waka Kobori (1:58.53); Hiroko Makino (2:00.68); Rio Shirai (2:01.21)	7:59.10	
14	1	7	France	Lucile Tessariol (2:00.01); Assia Touati (2:00.11); Marina Jehl (1:59.61); Anastasiia Kirpichnikova (2:00.25)	7:59.98	
15	2	8	Spain	María Daza (2:01.42); Alba Herrero (1:59.43); Paula Juste (1:59.54); Ainhoa Campabadal (1:59.84)	8:00.23	
16	1	8	Turkey	Gizem Güvenç (1:59.72); Ela Naz Özdemir (2:00.99); Ecem Dönmez (2:01.55); Zehra Bilgin (2:02.92)	8:05.18	

== Final ==
The final took place at 22:03 on 1 August. Australia led from beginning to end to win with a new Olympic record of 7:38.08, which broke the previous world record of 7:40.33 set by China at the previous Olympics by over two seconds. The US won silver with 7:40.86 and China won bronze with 7:42.34.

Kieran Pender from The Guardian wrote that the Australian team "live[d] up to expectations", while Titmus said "I feel like a bit of redemption for us", saying that she found her performance in the event at the previous Olympics disappointing. As part of the US' relay team, Katie Ledecky won her thirteenth Olympic medal, which was the most Olympic medals ever won by an American female in any event. Brazil's Maria Fernanda Costa swam a time of 1:56.06 as the first Brazilian swimmer, which was a new South American record in the 200 metres freestyle individual event.

Results
Rank	Lane	Team	Swimmers	Time	Notes
1st place, gold medalist(s)	4	Australia	Mollie O'Callaghan (1:53.52); Lani Pallister (1:55.61); Brianna Throssell (1:56.00); Ariarne Titmus (1:52.95)	7:38.08	OR
2nd place, silver medalist(s)	6	United States	Claire Weinstein (1:54.88); Paige Madden (1:55.65); Katie Ledecky (1:54.93); Erin Gemmell (1:55.40)	7:40.86	
3rd place, bronze medalist(s)	3	China	Yang Junxuan (1:54.52); Li Bingjie (1:55.05); Ge Chutong (1:57.45); Liu Yaxin (1:55.32)	7:42.34	
4	7	Canada	Mary-Sophie Harvey (1:56.33); Ella Jansen (1:57.50); Summer McIntosh (1:53.97); Julie Brousseau (1:58.25)	7:46.05	
5	1	Great Britain	Freya Colbert (1:55.95); Abbie Wood (1:56.57); Freya Anderson (1:56.15); Lucy Hope (1:59.56)	7:48.23	
6	5	Hungary	Nikolett Pádár (1:56.14); Lilla Minna Ábrahám (1:57.23); Ajna Késely (1:59.45); Panna Ugrai (1:57.70)	7:50.52	
7	2	Brazil	Maria Fernanda Costa (1:56.06 SA); Stephanie Balduccini (1:57.32); Maria Paula Heitmann (2:00.54); Gabrielle Roncatto (1:58.98)	7:52.90	
8	8	New Zealand	Erika Fairweather (1:56.82); Eve Thomas (1:59.48); Caitlin Deans (1:59.79); Laticia-Leigh Transom (1:59.80)	7:55.89	
