= Christine Rawak =

American athletic director

- Born: Newtown, Pennsylvania, U.S.
- Other name: Christine Stetson-Rawak Hill
- Education: University of Michigan; Northwestern University
- Occupation: Athletic Director (formerly)
- Employer: University of Delaware (formerly)
- Known for: Announced as new CEO of USA Swimming; resigned nine days later
- Spouse: Glenn Hill
- Children: 3

Christine Stetson-Rawak Hill is a former athletic director at the University of Delaware. She became the university's sixth director of athletics and the first woman to hold the position (full title: director of Intercollegiate Athletics and Recreation Services) as a permanent appointment. She was named CEO and president of USA Swimming in February 2025, but resigned nine days later. The following month it was announced that the university would not retain Rawak, but would instead begin a search for her replacement.

== High school ==
Prior to college, Rawak attended Germantown Academy in Fort Washington, Pennsylvania, where she was a swimmer and a member of the 1987 national championship team, graduating in 1988. Her primary events were the 1500/1650 freestyle, 200 backstroke, and 400 IM.

== College ==
At the University of Michigan, Rawak was a member of the Wolverines swimming and diving team and student government president, before earning her bachelor's degree in sports management and communications in 1992. She earned a master's degree in communication from Northwestern University.

== Coaching and university athletics executive ==
=== University of Michigan and Northwestern University ===
She was an assistant swim coach for the Wolverine swim team at the University of Michigan after her 1992 graduation, from 1992 to 1997. She was also in charge of the Wolverine Swim Camp during that time. Rawak was then an executive in the University of Michigan athletic department. She worked at the university for over a decade.

Rawak was then, from 1998 to 2004, the Northwestern University director of personnel and business resources in the Office of Alumni Relations and Development, during which time she also earned a master's degree in communication from Northwestern.

After leaving Northwestern, she returned to the University of Michigan, and for seven years was the assistant vice president of talent management and development operations in its Office of University Development. Then, from 2011 to 2016 she was the university's executive senior associate athletic director.

=== University of Delaware ===
Rawak was subsequently the University of Delaware athletic director for eight years, from May 2016 through 2025. In 2023, her compensation was $648,000 in salary and $55,000 in bonuses for a total of $704,000.

In February 2025 it was announced that Rawak would leave her position to become the new CEO of USA Swimming. That fell through nine days later, however. In March 2025, the University of Delaware President Dennis Assanis said that the university would not retain Rawak, but would instead begin a search for her replacement.

== USA Swimming ==
On February 19, 2025, USA Swimming named Rawak as its new CEO and president.

Nine days later, USA Swimming's board of governors announced that Rawak would not assume the role as CEO and president due to "unforeseen personal circumstances that we learned about late this week." USA Swimming stated that it had just learned of a complaint against her regarding her conduct while coaching at the University of Michigan that had been filed with the U.S. Center for SafeSport, an organization that handles abuse and misconduct claims, that Rawak had not disclosed during what USA Swimming called a "rigorous" vetting process. When they raised the issue with Rawak, USA Swimming said Rawak informed it that she intended to resign.

== Family ==
Rawak is a native of Newtown, Pennsylvania. She married Glenn Hill and the couple has three children. Hill was a gymnast at the University of Michigan.

== See also ==
- List of NCAA Division I athletic directors
