= Sandra Baldwin =

American real estate broker

President of the United States Olympic Committee
- In office 2000–2002

President of USA Swimming
- In office 1984–1986

Personal details
- Born: Mesa, Arizona

Sandra Baldwin (born 1938 or 1939) was the first female president of USA Swimming from 1984 to 1986 and the United States Olympic Committee from 2000 to 2002 until her resignation.

== Early life and education ==
Sandra Baldwin spent her childhood in Mesa, Arizona. From 1956 to 1959, Baldwin attended the University of Colorado Boulder before moving to Arizona State University. At Arizona State, she graduated in 1962 with a bachelor's degree.

== Career ==
In the 1970s, Baldwin remained at Arizona State as an English teacher. She previously worked for the Amateur Athletic Union before moving to USA Swimming in 1978. While she was working in real estate, Baldwin became USA Swimming's first female president from 1984 to 1986 and USA Shooting's president from 1994 to 1995.

In 2000, Baldwin was elected as the first woman president of the United States Olympic Committee after completing a four-year term as vice president of the committee. The following year, she was nominated to become a member of the International Olympic Committee. In 2002, Baldwin resigned from her position as President of the U.S. Olympic Committee when it was revealed there was conflicting information about her educational background. Her biography on the USOC's website falsely claimed that she completed a degree in English at the University of Colorado Boulder and an American literature degree at Arizona State University. Outside of her career as USOC president, Baldwin was the head of mission for the American team at the 1995 Pan American Games and the 2000 Summer Olympics.

== Awards and honors ==
Baldwin won a USA Swimming Athletes Committee award in 1986 and the USA Swimming award in 1990. In 2001, Baldwin was awarded the Gold Medallion by the International Swimming Hall of Fame.
