= Claire Weinstein =

American swimmer

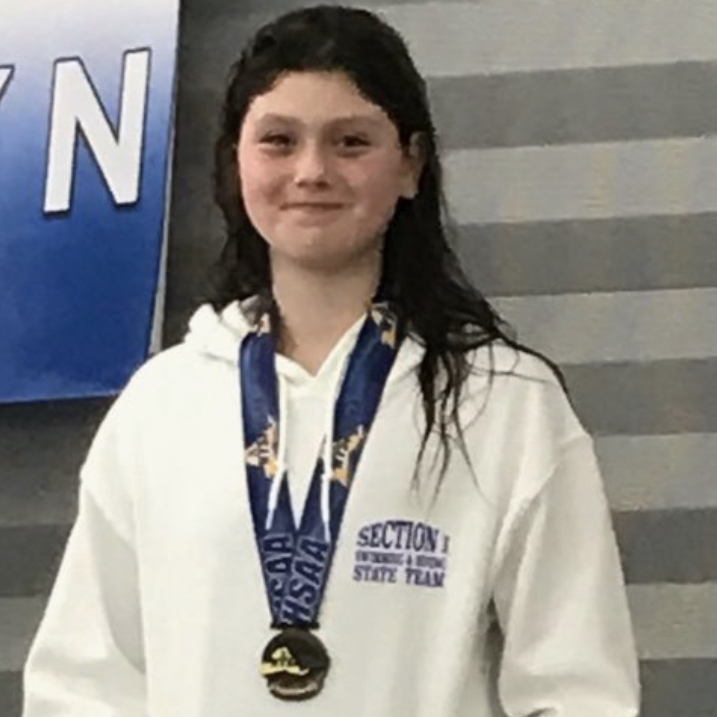
- Weinstein in 2019

Personal information
- Nationality: United States
- Born: March 1, 2007 (age 19) White Plains, New York, U.S.
- Height: 6 ft 0 in (183 cm)

Sport
- Sport: Swimming
- Strokes: Freestyle
- Club: Sandpipers of Nevada; Westchester Aquatic Club (former)
- College team: University of California, Berkeley
- Coach: Ron Aitken
Medal record
Women's swimming
Representing the United States
Olympic Games
Silver medal – second place	2024 Paris	4 × 200 m freestyle
World Championships (LC)
Gold medal – first place	2022 Budapest	4×200 m freestyle
Silver medal – second place	2025 Singapore	4×200 m freestyle
Bronze medal – third place	2025 Singapore	200 m freestyle
World Championships (SC)
Gold medal – first place	2024 Budapest	4×200 m freestyle
Bronze medal – third place	2024 Budapest	200 m freestyle

Claire Weinstein (born March 1, 2007) is an American Olympic freestyle swimmer who swims for the California Golden Bears. At the 2022 World Aquatics Championships, Weinstein helped Team USA win the gold medal in the women's 4 × 200 m freestyle relay.

At the 2024 Paris Olympics, Weinstein swam the individual 200m freestyle, in which she made the final, and came in 8th. She won the silver medal in the 4 × 200 m freestyle relay, joined by Katie Ledecky, Paige Madden, and Erin Gemmell. Weinstein's split of 1:54.88 was the fastest on the team, and the fourth-fastest freestyle at 200m by an American woman in history.

== Early life ==
Weinstein is a daughter of Rodney and Diane Weinstein, has one older brother (Michael) and three younger sisters (Mary, Sophie, and Emma), and was born in White Plains, New York. She is Jewish, was raised in the Reform Judaism tradition, and had a bat mitzvah at the Reform synagogue of Congregation Kol Ami in White Plains, New York. She attended the Highlands Middle School in White Plains and White Plains High School.

== Swimming career ==
=== Early career ===
Weinstein began to swim competitively at six years of age. She began her competitive swim career on the Lake Isle team in Eastchester, New York, setting multiple records at the Westchester County Swim Conference Championships. During the school year, Weinstein swam on the White Plains Varsity Swim team and competed year-round on club team Westchester Aquatic Club. Westchester Aquatic Club head coach Carle Fierro described Weinstein as "extremely easy to coach and ... really good at communicating how she felt in the water... In addition, she displayed a great singlemindedness in attaining goals. She was diligent about doing workouts and motivating team members to do their best as well."

=== 2021 ===
In 2021, at 13 years of age Weinstein qualified for the 2020 United States Olympic trials, becoming one of the youngest swimmers to qualify for the trials. She placed 20th in the 400m freestyle, not qualifying for that year's 2020 Summer Olympics.

In September 2021, Weinstein moved to Las Vegas, Nevada, to train with the Sandpipers of Nevada.

=== 2022 ===
On April 3, 2022, Weinstein won the USA Swimming National and Junior Championship 5K event by over a minute.

At the 2022 USA Swimming International Team Trials, Weinstein qualified for the United States team in the 2022 World Aquatics Championships. In the process she became the fastest American 15-year-old to swim the 200m freestyle event.

==== 2022 World Championships ====
2022 World Championships
Gold medal – first place	4×200 m freestyle	7:41.45 (CR)

At the 19th FINA World Championships Budapest 2022, Weinstein won a gold medal as a part of the United States Women's 4x200 relay at the age of 15; she was the youngest American swimmer to compete in the World Championships in 15 years. She also competed in the women's 200-meter freestyle, finishing in 10th place in the semi-finals and missing finals qualification by only seven hundredths of a second.

=== 2023 U.S. Championships ===
At the 2023 U.S. Championships, at 16 years of age Weinstein won the 200m freestyle in 1:55.26 (making her the 24th-fastest woman at the distance in history), defeating seven-time Olympic swimmer Katie Ledecky.

==== 2024; U.S Olympic Team Trials ====
On June 17, 2024, at the 2024 U.S Olympic Team Trials, Weinstein placed 2nd in the 200m freestyle with a time of 1:56.18, securing her spot for the individual 200m freestyle and 4x200m freestyle relay at the 2024 Paris Olympics.

== 2024 Paris Olympic silver ==
At 17 years of age, at the 2024 Paris Olympics, Weinstein swam the individual 200m freestyle, in which she made the final, and came in 8th. She was the youngest swimmer in the field.

She competed as well in the 4 × 200 m freestyle relay, joined by Katie Ledecky, Paige Madden, and Erin Gemmell. With a collective time of 7:40.86, and Weinstein swimming the fastest split on the team (1:54.88) as she led off the relay, the team won the silver medal, earning Weinstein her first Olympic medal. Weinstein's time was a personal best, and with it she became the fourth-fastest American woman ever in the 200m free, at 17 years old. Among American women, only Allison Schmitt (1:53.61), Ledecky (1:53.73), and Missy Franklin (1:54.81) had swum times faster than Weinstein’s 1:54.88.

Weinstein committed to attend UC Berkeley for college.

=== 2025 ===
After a rough start at the 2025 World Aquatics Championships, due to Team USA Sickness and scratching the 400m freestyle, Weinstein swam a personal best of (1:54:67) on her way to winning bronze in the individual 200m freestyle and won silver in the 4x200 freestyle relay with Team USA, setting a new American record.

=== 2026 ===
At the 2026 NCAA Division I Women's Swimming and Diving Championships, Weinstein came in first in the 500 yard freestyle and second in the 1650 freestyle.

== See also ==
- List of select Jewish swimmers
- List of Jewish Olympic medalists
- List of Olympic medalists in swimming (women)
