= 2022 USA Swimming International Team Trials =

USA Swimming qualifying event

2022 Phillips 66 International Team Trials
- Host city: Greensboro, North Carolina, United States
- Date: April 26 – 30, 2022
- Venue: Greensboro Aquatic Center
- Events: 34 (men: 17; women: 17)

The 2022 Phillips 66 International Team Trials was held from April 26 to 30, 2022 in Greensboro, North Carolina at the Greensboro Aquatic Center. Contested swimming events were conducted in a 50-meter (long course) pool. The competition served as the selection meet for determining the swim team to represent the United States at the 2022 World Aquatics Championships, 2022 Junior Pan Pacific Swimming Championships, and 2022 Mel Zajac Junior International. It was held separate from the 2022 US National Championships.

== Host selection ==
In August 2021, Greensboro Aquatic Center in Greensboro, North Carolina was announced as host of the International Team Trials in part due to scheduling conflicts in Indianapolis, Indiana with the 2022 FDIC International, which had already been scheduled and resulted in hotels being booked during the date range of interest.

== Overall results ==
All events were swum in a heats, finals format except for the 800 meter and 1500 meter freestyle events which were broken into slowest heats and a timed final where competitors swam the event once. Event finals were broken into a, b, and c finals with a and b finals open to anyone and the c final reserved for junior swimmers.

Key: Highlighted swimmers fulfilled the qualification criteria and were named to the team roster for the 2022 World Aquatics Championships in the event. Highlighted swimmers achieved a top-two finish and the FINA "A" cut standard for the 2022 World Aquatics Championships in the event and were not named to the team roster.

=== Men ===
Event	First		Second		Third	
50 m freestyle	Caeleb Dressel	21.29	Michael Andrew	21.45	Brooks Curry	21.84
100 m freestyle	Caeleb Dressel	47.79	Brooks Curry	48.04	Ryan Held	48.18
200 m freestyle	Kieran Smith	1:45.25	Drew Kibler	1:45.32	Carson Foster	1:45.66
400 m freestyle	Kieran Smith	3:46.61	Trey Freeman	3:46.93	Ross Dant	3:47.11
800 m freestyle	Bobby Finke	7:43.32	Charlie Clark	7:50.07	David Johnston	7:54.40
1500 m freestyle	Bobby Finke	14:45.72	Charlie Clark	14:51.78	David Johnston	15:08.90
50 m backstroke	Hunter Armstrong	23.71	Justin Ress	23.92	Shaine Casas	24.00
100 m backstroke	Hunter Armstrong	52.20	Ryan Murphy	52.49	Justin Ress	52.73
200 m backstroke	Ryan Murphy	1:55.01	Shaine Casas	1:55.46	Jack Aikins	1:56.29
50 m breaststroke	Michael Andrew	26.52	Nic Fink	26.55	Kevin Houseman	27.24
100 m breaststroke	Nic Fink	58.37	Michael Andrew	58.51	Charlie Swanson	1:00.06
200 m breaststroke	Nic Fink Charlie Swanson	2:08.84	none awarded		Jake Foster	2:09.73
50 m butterfly	Caeleb Dressel	22.84	Michael Andrew	22.87	Maxime Rooney	23.25
100 m butterfly	Caeleb Dressel	50.20	Michael Andrew	50.88	Trenton Julian	51.10
200 m butterfly	Luca Urlando	1:54.10	Trenton Julian	1:54.22	Zach Harting	1:55.09
200 m individual medley	Chase Kalisz	1:56.21	Carson Foster	1:56.65	Sam Stewart	1:57.70
400 m individual medley	Carson Foster	4:09.33	Chase Kalisz	4:10.50	Bobby Finke	4:10.57

=== Women ===
Event	First		Second		Third	
50 m freestyle	Torri Huske	24.50	Erika Brown	24.52	Gretchen Walsh	24.53
100 m freestyle	Torri Huske	53.35	Claire Curzan	53.58	Erika Brown	53.59
200 m freestyle	Katie Ledecky	1:55.15	Claire Weinstein	1:57.08	Leah Smith	1:57.44
400 m freestyle	Katie Ledecky	3:59.52	Leah Smith	4:03.16	Bella Sims	4:06.61
800 m freestyle	Katie Ledecky	8:09.27	Leah Smith	8:17.52	Bella Sims	8:22.36
1500 m freestyle	Katie Ledecky	15:38.99	Katie Grimes	15:51.36	Bella Sims	16:15.87
50 m backstroke	Katharine Berkoff	27.12	Regan Smith	27.25	Olivia Smoliga	27.33
100 m backstroke	Regan Smith	57.76	Claire Curzan	58.39	Rhyan White	58.59
200 m backstroke	Phoebe Bacon	2:05.08	Rhyan White	2:05.13	Regan Smith	2:05.66
50 m breaststroke^{[a]}	Lilly King	29.76	Kaitlyn Dobler	30.34	Lydia Jacoby	30.35
100 m breaststroke	Lilly King	1:05.67	Annie Lazor	1:06.12	Kaitlyn Dobler	1:06.19
200 m breaststroke	Lilly King	2:21.19	Kate Douglass	2:21.43	Annie Lazor	2:21.91
50 m butterfly	Claire Curzan	25.49	Torri Huske	25.68	Kelsi Dahlia	25.71
100 m butterfly	Torri Huske	56.28	Claire Curzan	56.35	Kelsi Dahlia	57.58
200 m butterfly	Hali Flickinger	2:06.35	Regan Smith	2:07.93	Charlotte Hook	2:08.80
200 m individual medley	Alex Walsh	2:07.84	Leah Hayes	2:09.99	Beata Nelson	2:11.80
400 m individual medley	Katie Grimes	4:36.17	Emma Weyant	4:37.72	Hali Flickinger	4:39.50

^{a} Annie Lazor, was selected for the 2022 World Aquatics Championships team in the 50 meter breaststroke based on her second-place finish in an Olympic event, the 100 meter breaststroke, and swimming a FINA "A" cut time, 31.04 seconds, in the first 50 meters of the 100 meter breaststroke event, instead of being selected based on results from the 50 meter breaststroke event, which she chose not to compete in at the Trials.

== Results for World Championships freestyle relay events ==
The following swimmers fulfilled the qualification criteria and were named to the team roster for the 2022 World Aquatics Championships in the event.

=== Men ===
Place →	1st	2nd	3rd	4th	5th	6th
4×100 m freestyle	Caeleb Dressel; 47.79	Brooks Curry; 48.04	Ryan Held; 48.18	Drew Kibler; Hunter Armstrong; 48.25	none awarded	Justin Ress; 48.38
4×200 m freestyle	Kieran Smith; 1:45.26	Drew Kibler; 1:45.32	Carson Foster; 1:45.66	Trenton Julian; 1:46.69	Coby Carrozza; 1:46.87	Trey Freeman; 1:46.93

=== Women ===
Place →	1st	2nd	3rd	4th	5th	6th
4×100 m freestyle	Torri Huske; 53.35	Claire Curzan; 53.58	Erika Brown; 53.59	Natalie Hinds; 53.65	Kate Douglass; 53.99	Mallory Comerford; 54.09
4×200 m freestyle	Katie Ledecky; 1:55.15	Claire Weinstein; 1:57.08	Leah Smith; 1:57.44	Hali Flickinger; 1:57.53	Bella Sims; 1:57.71	Alex Walsh; 1:57.82

== Records set ==
The following records were set during the course of competition.

Event	Stage	Name	Time	Date	Day	Record	Ref
200 m backstroke (women's)	Final	Phoebe Bacon	2:05.08	April 27, 2022	2	US Open record	
50 m butterfly (men's)	Final	Caeleb Dressel	22.84	April 27, 2022	2	US Open record	
50 m backstroke (women's)	Heats	Regan Smith	27.40	April 28, 2022	3	US Open record	
50 m backstroke (men's)	Heats	Hunter Armstrong	24.01	April 28, 2022	3	Americas record, American record, US Open record	
50 m breaststroke (men's)	Final	Michael Andrew	26.52	April 28, 2022	3	American record, US Open record	
50 m backstroke (women's)	Final	Katharine Berkoff	27.12	April 28, 2022	3	Americas record, American record, US Open record	
50 m backstroke (men's)	Final	Hunter Armstrong	23.71	April 28, 2022	3	World record, Americas record, American record, US Open record	
100 m backstroke (women's)	Final	Regan Smith	57.76	April 29, 2022	4	US Open record	
200 m individual medley (women's)	Final	Alex Walsh	2:07.84	April 30, 2022	5	US Open record	
800 m freestyle (men's)	Final	Bobby Finke	7:43.32	April 30, 2022	5	US Open record	

== International team qualifiers ==
=== 2022 World Aquatics Championships team ===
The following pool swimmers qualified for the United States team in at least one event for the 2022 World Aquatics Championships, held in Budapest, Hungary in June and July. Pool swimmers who qualified for the World Championships took part in an out-of-country training camp, in Rijeka, Croatia in early to mid-June, training all-together prior to the start of competition. USA Swimming previously used Croatia as a pre-competition training camp base leading up to the 2015 World Aquatics Championships, in Kazan, Russia, and the 2017 World Aquatics Championships, also in Budapest, Hungary.

==== Men ====
- Michael Andrew, Hunter Armstrong, Coby Carrozza, Shaine Casas, Charlie Clark, Brooks Curry, Caeleb Dressel, Nic Fink, Bobby Finke, Carson Foster, Trey Freeman, Ryan Held, Trenton Julian, Chase Kalisz, Drew Kibler, Ryan Murphy, Justin Ress, Kieran Smith, Charlie Swanson, Luca Urlando.

==== Women ====
- Phoebe Bacon, Katharine Berkoff, Erika Brown, Mallory Comerford, Claire Curzan, Kate Douglass, Hali Flickinger, Katie Grimes, Leah Hayes, Natalie Hinds, Torri Huske, Lilly King, Annie Lazor, Katie Ledecky, Bella Sims, Leah Smith, Regan Smith, Alex Walsh, Claire Weinstein, Emma Weyant, Rhyan White.

=== 2022 Junior Pan Pacific Swimming Championships team ===
The following pool swimmers achieved a spot on the United States roster in at least one event for the 2022 Junior Pan Pacific Swimming Championships.

==== Men ====
- Spencer Aurnou-Rhees, Ben Delmar, Daniel Diehl, Diggory Dillingham, Bobby Dinunzio, Alec Enyeart, Zhier Fan, Thomas Heilman, Keaton Jones, Ilya Kharun (roster version one only), Cooper Lucas, Matthew Lucky, Rex Maurer, Henry McFadden, Watson Nguyen, Josh Parent, Aaron Shackell, Hudson Williams, Maximus Williamson, Kaii Winkler, Josh Zuchowski.

==== Women ====
- Berit Berglund, Lily Christianson, Jillian Cox, Piper Enge, Erin Gemmell, Cavan Gormsen, Kayla Han, Bailey Hartman, Tess Howley, Natalie Mannion, Michaela Mattes, Anna Moesch, Kennedy Noble, Teagan O'Dell, Julia Podkościelny, Alex Shackell, Emily Thompson, Maggie Wanezek, Gracie Weyant, Kayla Wilson.

=== 2022 Mel Zajac Junior International team ===
The following pool swimmers were each named to the roster for the 2022 Mel Zajac Junior International team representing the United States in at least one event.

==== Men ====
- Matthew Chai, JT Ewing, Nate Germonprez, Braeden Haughey, Mitchell Ledford, Will Modglin, Humberto Najera, Baylor Nelson, Jacob Pishko.

==== Women ====
- Lucy Bell, Hannah Bellard, Lilla Bognar, Chloe Kim, Erika Pelaez, Addison Sauickie, Levenia Sim, Blair Stoneburg, Maddie Waggoner, Ella Welch.

== See also ==
- United States at the 2022 World Aquatics Championships
- Swimming at the 2022 World Aquatics Championships
- List of swimming competitions
