= Bella Sims =

American swimmer (born 2005)

Personal information
- Full name: Arabella Gabrielle Sims
- Nickname: Bella
- Born: May 25, 2005 (age 21) Las Vegas, Nevada, U.S.
- Height: 5 ft 6 in (168 cm)
- Weight: 135 lb (61 kg)

Sport
- Sport: Swimming
- Event: 4x100, 4x200 freestyle relay
- Strokes: Backstroke, Freestyle
- Club: Sandpipers of Nevada
- College team: University of Florida; University of Michigan
- Coach: Ronald Aitken (Sandpipers); Anthony Nesty (U. of Florida); Whitney Hite (U. of Florida); Matt Bowe (U. of Michigan)
Medal record
Women's swimming
Representing the United States
Olympic Games
Silver medal – second place	2020 Tokyo	4×200 m freestyle
World Championships (LC)
Gold medal – first place	2022 Budapest	4×200 m freestyle
Silver medal – second place	2023 Fukuoka	4×200 m freestyle
Silver medal – second place	2023 Fukuoka	4×100 m mixed freestyle
Silver medal – second place	2025 Singapore	4×200 m freestyle

Arabella Gabrielle Sims (born May 25, 2005) is an American swimmer who competed for the University of Florida and University of Michigan, and a 2020 Tokyo Olympic silver medalist in the 4x200-meter freestyle relay.

Bella Sims was born May 25, 2005 in Las Vegas, Nevada, and grew up in Henderson, Nevada, where she attended Nevada Connections Academy, currently an online, tuition-free public school.

== 2020 Olympic trials ==
At the 2020 United States Olympic Trials, at Omaha, Nebraska in June 2021, Sims finished fifth in the finals of the 200 freestyle, qualifying her for the preliminaries of the Women's 4x200-meter relay team at the 2020 Olympics, in which she participated. She was also fifth in the finals of the 800-meter freestyle. She was one of four high school athletes to make the United States team. Showing a depth of talent and diverse skills in many events, Sims qualified for 11 of the 14 events contested at the trials, though she made the finals in only two events.

== 2020 Tokyo Olympics ==
At the Tokyo 2020 summer games, in late July 2021, Sims earned a silver medal as part of the United States' Women's 4×200 meter freestyle team. Although she swam only in the preliminary heats of the event, her contribution helped the U.S. team advance to the final. Sims swam lead-off in Heat One of the preliminaries, followed by Paige Madden, Katie McLaughlin, and Brooke Forde. Her preliminary team placed first in Preliminary Heat One, with a combined time of 7:47.57. The finals team without Sims later swam a combined time of 7:40.73.

Sims did not quite qualify for the U.S. Olympic team in the June, 2024 Olympic trials in Indianapolis.

=== University of Florida ===
Enrolling in the Fall of 2023, she attended the University of Florida, where she trained and competed with the strong Florida Gators swimming and diving program. As a Freshman, Sims was the first SEC swimmer to ever be named the SEC Swimmer of the Year, and SEC Freshman Swimmer of the Year in the same year. Swimming for Florida Head Coach Athony Nesty, and Women's Associate Coach Whitney Hite, Sims won All-American honors thirteen times, and was a seven-time NCAA All American. With Nesty as Head Coach, the Florida Women's 2024 NCAA 800-freestyle relay team of Bella Sims, Emma Weyant, Isabella Ivey, and Micayla Cronk won Florida's first National title in over thirty years. The relay teams time of 6:48.59, was a new program record. In 2025, Sims was a Southeastern Conference Champion in the 100 and 200 backstroke, and the 400 Medley relay. A strong student, in 2024, she received recognition as an All-American scholar from the College Swimming Coaches Association of America.

=== University of Michigan ===
After two seasons at Florida, Sims transferred to the University of Michigan beginning in the Fall of 2025 to swim under British-born Head Coach, Matt Bowe. In late October, 2025, Sims excelled in a meet against Northwestern and UCLA, helping Michigan to defeat both opponents. Representing Michigan, she swam a 49.87 for her 100-yard backstroke leg of a 4x100 yard medley relay. She also won the 200-yard freestyle in a time of 1:41.43, close to the top national collegiate time of the season.

=== International competition ===
At the 2022 World Aquatics Championships in Budapest Sims swam in the preliminaries of the 4 × 200 metre freestyle relay recording a time of 1:55.91 which earned her a place in the final. The 17 year old then swam the anchor leg in the final with a split of 1:54.60 which was nearly three seconds faster than her flat start personal best of 1:57.53. The Americans won the relay giving Sims her first gold medal in a major international championship.

Demonstrating consistency on the elite international stage, Sims captured a silver medal in the 2023 World Championships in Fukuoka in both the Women's 4×200 meter freestyle, and the 4×100 meter mixed freestyle.

In the 2025 World Aquatics Championships, she won a silver medal in the 4x200-meter freestyle relay.

In March 2025, the International Testing Agency announced that Sims bore "no fault or negligence" for testing positive for hydrochlorothiazide (HTTZ) in September 2024 as her anti-inflammatory prescription medication was found to have been contaminated. Therefore, she received no sanction and no results were disqualified.

=== Honors ===
In 2023–2024, Sims received the Tracy Caulkins and Skip Foster award from Florida Swim and Dive.

In January 2024, Sims finalized a contract with Speedo swimwear and equipment. She subsequently planned to race in Speedo’s Fastskin® swimsuit in upcoming competitions.
