= Katie Grimes =

American swimmer

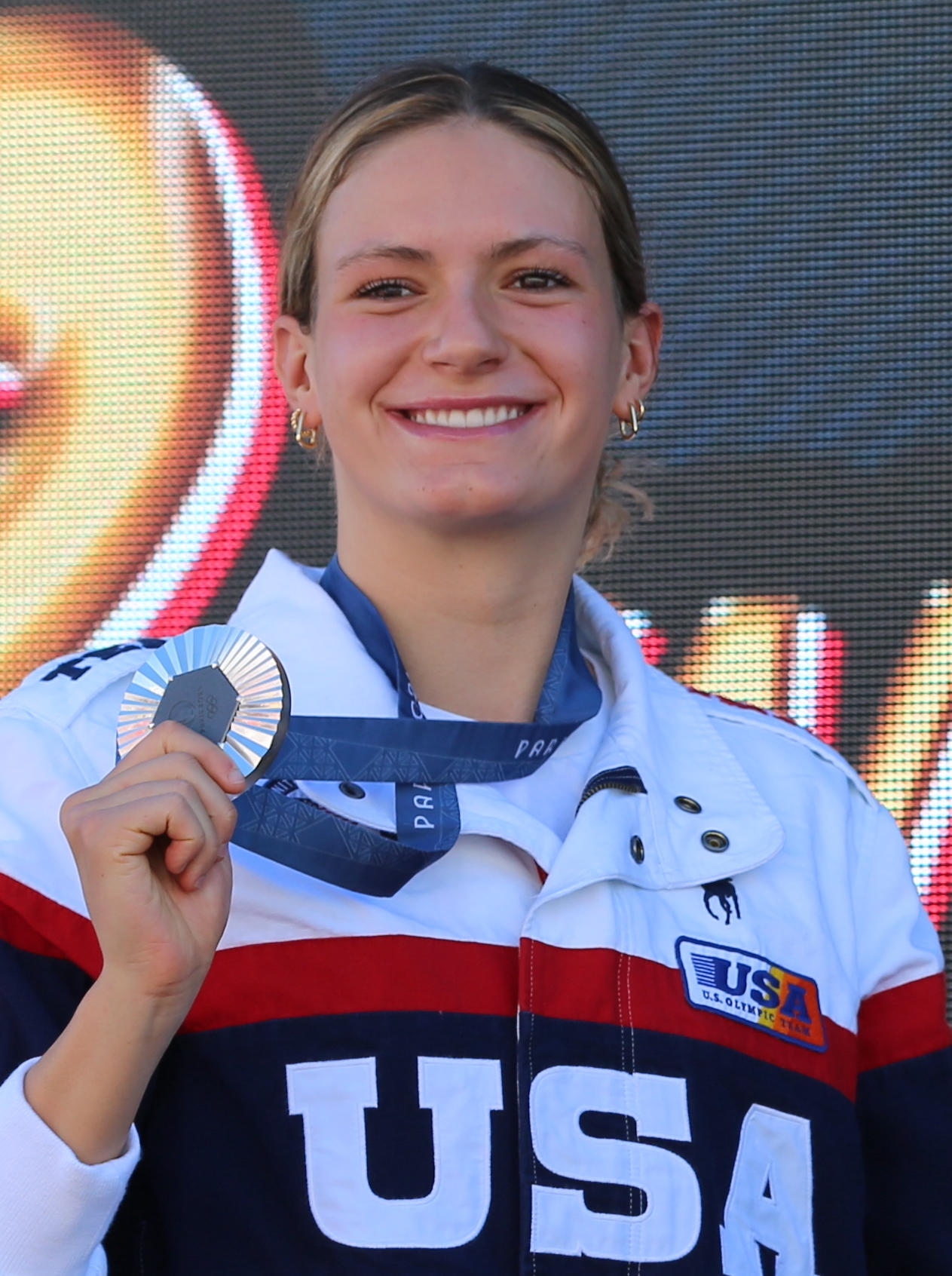
- Grimes in 2024

Personal information
- Full name: Kathryn Eileen Grimes
- Born: January 8, 2006 (age 20) Las Vegas, Nevada, U.S.

Sport
- Country: United States
- Sport: Swimming
- Strokes: Freestyle, individual medley, backstroke
- Club: Sandpipers of Nevada
- Coach: Ron Aitken
Medal record
Women's swimming
Representing the United States
Olympic Games
Silver medal – second place	2024 Paris	400 m medley
World Championships (LC)
Silver medal – second place	2022 Budapest	1500 m freestyle
Silver medal – second place	2022 Budapest	400 m medley
Silver medal – second place	2023 Fukuoka	400 m medley
Bronze medal – third place	2023 Fukuoka	10 km open water
World Championships (SC)
Gold medal – first place	2024 Budapest	4×200 m freestyle
Silver medal – second place	2024 Budapest	400 m medley
Bronze medal – third place	2024 Budapest	800 m freestyle
World Junior Open Water Championships
Gold medal – first place	2022 Victoria	7.5km open water
Gold medal – first place	2022 Victoria	Team event

Kathryn Eileen Grimes (born January 8, 2006) is an American competitive swimmer. At the 2022 World Aquatics Championships, she won silver medals in the 1500 meter freestyle and the 400 meter individual medley. She placed fourth in the 800 meter freestyle at the 2020 Summer Olympics, where she was the youngest member of the US Olympic Team at 15 years of age.

== Early life ==
Grimes spent her early childhood in Las Vegas, and began her career swimming for the Sandpipers competitive team in Nevada.

== 2020 Olympic Games ==
At the 2020 US Olympic Trials in Omaha, Nebraska, Grimes qualified for the 2020 Summer Olympics in the 800 meter freestyle, placing second after Katie Ledecky with a time of 8:20.36. Following the race, Ledecky commented that Grimes was the "future" of swimming in the United States, and also said to Grimes, "Heck yeah I mean you're the now. You're the present."

Ledecky gave Grimes the nickname of "Katie squared" after they became teammates. When she arrived in Tokyo, Japan, she was 15 years old and the youngest athlete on the 2020 US Olympic team. Grimes ranked second overall in the prelims heats of the 800 meter freestyle with a time of 8:17.05, which was less than a second and a half slower than first-ranked swimmer in the prelims heats, Katie Ledecky. In the final, Grimes placed fourth with a time of 8:19.38, finishing within six seconds of both silver medalist Ariarne Titmus of Australia and bronze medalist Simona Quadarella of Italy.

== 2021 World Short Course Championships ==
Grimes entered to compete in the 800 meter freestyle at the 2021 World Short Course Championships held at Etihad Arena in Abu Dhabi, United Arab Emirates in December. As part of the Abu Dhabi Aquatics Festival, also run by FINA and held at the same time as the championships, Grimes entered to compete in the 10 kilometer open water swim, where she placed 25th with a time of 2:01:04.0. The following day, December 17, Grimes swam a 8:16.01 in the prelims heats of the 800 meter freestyle at the championships, finishing fifth in her heat, ranking seventh overall and qualifying for the final the following day. December 18, Grimes officially withdrew from competition alongside teammate Lydia Jacoby and did not race in the final of the 800 meter freestyle due to COVID-19 pandemic-related protocols in place at the championships.

== 2022 ==
On April 1, Grimes won the 10 kilometer marathon swim at the 2022 US Open Water National Championships. She also won the national junior title in the 7.5 kilometer open water swim.

=== 2022 International Team Trials ===
At the 2022 US International Team Trials in Greensboro, North Carolina in late April, she placed fourth in the 800 meter freestyle with a time of 8:22.73. The following day, she ranked eighth in the prelims heats of the 200 meter freestyle, qualifying for the final with her time of 1:58.67. Later in the same session, she qualified for the final of the 200 meter backstroke with a time of 2:11.31 and overall eighth-rank. In the evening finals session, she placed eighth in the 200 meter freestyle with a 1:58.22 and did not swim in the final of the 200 meter backstroke. On day three, she ranked second in the prelims heats of the 400 meter individual medley with a time of 4:41.02, advancing to the evening final. She won the final with a time of 4:36.17, qualifying for the 2022 World Aquatics Championships team in the event. The next day, she ranked sixth in the preliminary heats of the 400 meter freestyle with a 4:11.39 and qualified for the evening final. She placed fourth in the final, finishing in 4:06.67. In the final of the 1500 meter freestyle on day five, she swam a 15:51.36, placing second and qualifying for the World Championships team in the event.

=== 2022 Marathon Swim World Series ===
For the 10 kilometre marathon swim at the first leg of the 2022 Marathon Swim World Series, held at Albarquel in Setúbal, Portugal in late May, Grimes placed eighth overall, ranked eighth amongst female competitors in terms of points scored, and ranked as the highest-scoring female American competitor. Based on her result at the World Series, she was named to the USA Swimming roster for the 10 kilometre marathon swim in open water swimming at the 2022 World Aquatics Championships.

=== 2022 World Aquatics Championships ===
2022 World Championships
Silver medal – second place	1500 m freestyle	15:44.89
Silver medal – second place	400 m individual medley	4:32.67

Grimes started her competition at the 2022 World Aquatics Championships on the second day of pool swimming, advancing to the final of the 1500 meter freestyle from the preliminaries, where she swam a 15:57.05 to enter the final with a prelims time over half a second faster than fourth-ranked Lani Pallister of Australia. She swam a personal best time of 15:44.89 in the final to win the silver medal, finishing over four full seconds ahead of bronze medalist Lani Pallister. On the final day of pool swimming competition, she ranked second in the prelims of the 400 meter individual medley, qualifying for the final with a time of 4:36.68. In the final, she won the silver medal with a personal best time of 4:32.67. Following pool swimming competition, she competed in the 10 kilometer open water swim, placing fifth with a time of 2:02:37.2, which was less than 10 seconds behind gold medalist Sharon van Rouwendaal of the Netherlands.

=== FINA World Cup ===
On the second day Indianapolis leg of the 2022 FINA Swimming World Cup, Grimes swam the short course 1500m freestyle, earning the World Junior Record with a time of 15:42.05.

== 2024 Summer Olympics ==
In the 2024 Summer Olympics she gained a silver medal in the 400 metre individual medley event with a time of 4:33.40. She also participated in the women's 1500 metre freestyle, but didn't qualify for the final.

== Personal best times ==
=== Long course meters (50 m pool) ===
Event	Time		Meet	Location	Date	Ref
200 m freestyle	1:58.22		2022 US International Team Trials	Greensboro, North Carolina	April 27, 2022	
400 m freestyle	4:05.77		2022 TYR Pro Swim Series – Mission Viejo	Mission Viejo, California	June 2, 2022	
800 m freestyle	8:17.05	h	2020 Summer Olympics	Tokyo, Japan	July 29, 2021	
1500 m freestyle	15:44.89		2022 World Aquatics Championships	Budapest, Hungary	June 20, 2022	
200 m backstroke	2:09.52		2022 TYR Pro Swim Series – Mission Viejo	Mission Viejo, California	June 3, 2022	
400 m individual medley	4:32.67		2022 World Aquatics Championships	Budapest, Hungary	June 25, 2022	

Legend: h – prelims heat

== Awards ==
- SwimSwam, Top 100 (Women's): 2022 (#39)
- Golden Goggle Awards, Fran Crippen open water swimmer of the Year: 2023, 2024

== See also ==
- List of World Aquatics Championships medalists in swimming (women)
