= Leah Neale =

Australian swimmer (born 1995)

Personal information
- National team: Australia
- Born: 1 August 1995 (age 30) Ipswich, Queensland, Australia
- Height: 173 cm (5 ft 8 in)
- Weight: 66 kg (146 lb)

Sport
- Sport: Swimming
- Strokes: Freestyle
- Club: DC Trident; Chandler
- Coach: Vince Raleigh
Medal record
Women's swimming
Representing Australia
Event	1st	2nd	3rd
Olympic Games	0	1	1
World Championships (LC)	3	1	1
World Championships (SC)	2	1	2
Total	5	3	4
Olympic Games
Silver medal – second place	2016 Rio de Janeiro	4×200 m freestyle
Bronze medal – third place	2020 Tokyo	4×200 m freestyle
World Championships (LC)
Gold medal – first place	2019 Gwangju	4×200 m freestyle
Gold medal – first place	2022 Budapest	4×100 m freestyle
Gold medal – first place	2022 Budapest	4×100 m mixed freestyle
Silver medal – second place	2022 Budapest	4×200 m freestyle
Bronze medal – third place	2017 Budapest	4×200 m freestyle
World Championships (SC)
Gold medal – first place	2022 Melbourne	4×100 m freestyle
Gold medal – first place	2022 Melbourne	4×200 m freestyle
Silver medal – second place	2024 Budapest	4×100 m freestyle
Bronze medal – third place	2014 Doha	4×200 m freestyle
Bronze medal – third place	2024 Budapest	4×200 m freestyle
Commonwealth Games
Gold medal – first place	2018 Gold Coast	4×200 m freestyle
Junior Pan Pacific Championships
Silver medal – second place	2012 Honolulu	4×200 m freestyle
Bronze medal – third place	2012 Honolulu	400 m freestyle

Leah Neale (born 1 August 1995) is an Australian competitive swimmer currently swimming for DC Trident at the International Swimming League. She competed at the 2016 Summer Olympics where she won a silver medal in the 4 × 200 metre freestyle relay. In the same event at the 2018 Commonwealth Games she won a gold medal.

== World records ==
=== Short course metres ===
No.	Event	Time	Meet	Location	Date	Status	Ref
1	4x200 m freestyle relay^{[a]}	7:30.87	2022 World Championships (25 m)	Melbourne, Australia	14 December 2022	Former	

^{a} split 1:52.67 (3rd leg), with Madison Wilson (1st leg), Mollie O'Callaghan (2nd leg), Lani Pallister (4th leg)
