= Anna Chiara Mascolo =

Italian swimmer (born 2001)

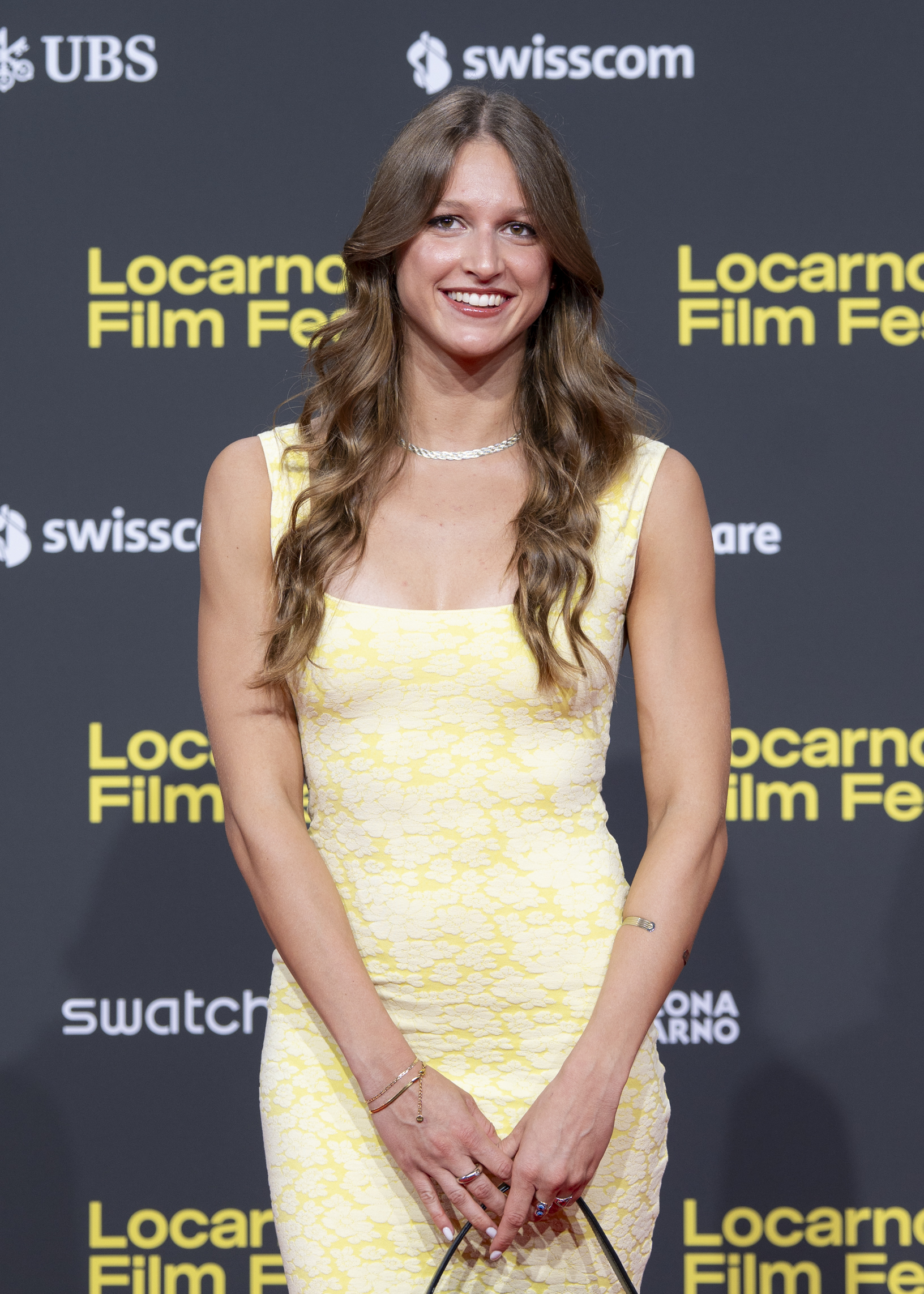
- Mascolo in 2025

Personal information
- Nationality: Italian
- Born: 5 June 2001 (age 25) Florence, Italy
- Height: 1.78

Sport
- Sport: Swimming
Medal record
Women's swimming
Representing Italy
Mediterranean Games
Silver medal – second place	2026 Taranto	200 m freestyle

Anna Chiara Mascolo (born 5 June 2001) is an Italian swimmer. She competed in the women's 4 × 200 metre freestyle relay at the 2020 Summer Olympics.
