= Swimming World =

US-based quarterly swimming magazine

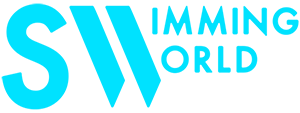
- Editor: John Lohn
- Categories: Sport magazine
- Frequency: Quarterly
- Publisher: Jack Hallahan
- First issue: January 1960
- Company: H2 Media
- Country: US
- Based in: Fort Lauderdale, Florida
- Language: English
- Website: swimmingworldmagazine.com
- ISSN: 0039-7431
- OCLC: 247119104

Swimming World is a US-based quarterly swimming magazine that was first published in a magazine format as Junior Swimmer in January 1960. It concurrently runs online websites Swimming World Magazine and Swimming World News (known as SwimInfo prior to 2006).

== History ==
In its earliest form, Junior Swimmer began as a mimeograph/newsletter published by Peter Daland in the summer of 1952. In 1960, Coach Daland passed the responsibility of the project to Albert Schoenfeld due to Daland's greater coaching demands as the swim coach at the University of Southern California and the Los Angeles Athletic Club. The January 1960 issue was the first published in a magazine format, still called Junior Swimmer.

The magazine then went through six title changes over the next 45 years. In May 1961, the magazine changed its main cover title to Jr./Sr. Swimmer.

The publication then combined with Swimming World in June 1961. At that time, Swimming World was still a mimeograph/newsletter, which had been published for the previous 10 years by Robert J. H. Kiphuth. The June 1961 issue of the newly combined operation used a two part title, shown in two lines with different fonts, as Jr./Sr. Swimmer and Swimming World.

The title changed again the following month, settling on a single defined title, all in consistent font, of Junior Swimmer Swimming World for the July 1961 issue.

The title changed again in May 1962, when it became Junior Swimmer and Swimming World, with the words "Junior Swimmer and" shown as an upper line in a much less prominent font, making the words "Swimming World" the visually main name. In the March 1964 issue, the words were switched to Swimming World and Junior Swimmer, with the lower placed "and Junior Swimmer" still shown in a less prominent font on the cover.

This prominent Swimming World, with minor and Junior Swimmer title format continued through the February 2005 issue, with the magazine finally settling on its still-current Swimming World only title for its March 2005 issue, which brought attention to the change by showing only one story on its cover – "The Changing Face of Swimming".

== Operations ==
Swimming World has correspondents in Europe and Australia, and keeps track of all major FINA-sanctioned competitions, as well as tabulating extensive records of competitions ranging from junior to masters level swimming. It also provides advice on health related and technique issues for people with an interest in swimming.

Brent Rutemiller was the chief executive officer of Sports Publications International and Publisher of Swimming World Magazine, SWIM Magazine and Swimming Technique Magazine from 2002 until 2022. Under his tenure, Rutemiller re-branded each media vehicle under one print title, Swimming World Magazine, and then re-launched all three magazines as separate digital downloads. Shortly thereafter, he launched Swimming World Radio and Swimming World TV as online properties. The Morning Swim Show is Swimming World TV's flagship program which streams weekday mornings. In 2015, Rutemiller introduced Swimming World Biweekly as a free digital magazine aggregating the top stories on the Internet every two weeks.

In 2017, the International Swimming Hall of Fame (ISHOF) merged its operations with Swimming World Magazine. The combination provided the International Swimming Hall of Fame with an outreach arm, that Swimming World can provide, to the athletes, coaches and volunteers around the world in aquatics. Brent Rutemiller became the CEO of the International Swimming Hall of Fame but retired in 2023.

A new entity, H2 Media, acquired the Swimming World assets in February 2024 and is relaunching the brand including bring back the print publication, revamping digital channels, and attracting a younger generation of readers.

=== Website and magazine features ===
Features of coaches on the website and in the magazine have been highlighted by local (University-level) news for providing a view into the unique paths coaches take to reach their coaching position and the methodologies used by coaches for training and keeping their athletes motivated.

== Awards ==
The magazine produces an annual year-end list of the Swimming World Swimmer of the Year awards, naming winners in various categories. As of 2019, the categories were: African, Male and Female; American, Male and Female; European, Male and Female; Pacific Rim, Male and Female; and, from these eight regional winners, World Female and World Male.

In addition to yearly awards for swimming, Swimming World allocates awards annually to athletes in other aquatics sports such as synchronized swimming, diving, and water polo.

The magazine also honors the top high school swim teams and swimmers in the United States on an annual summer (end of the high school year) basis, including its awards for Female High School Swimmer of the Year and Male High School Swimmer of the Year.

== Notable stories ==
The following are a selection of notable stories where news agencies reported, referenced, highlighted, or featured Swimming World and its role in the story, and high-profile stories covered by Swimming World itself:

- Between 2015 and 2021, Swimming World covered a number of high-profile engagements between Olympic medalists and their significant other including Kathleen Baker to Sean Dowling, Florent Manaudou to Pernille Blume, Caeleb Dressel to Meghan Haila, Townley Haas to Megan Meseck, Federica Pellegrini to Matteo Guinta, Ranomi Kromowidjojo to Ferry Weertman, Florian Wellbrock to Sarah Köhler, and Cody Miller to Ali DeWitt.
- Day one of wave II of the 2020 US Olympic Trials, Swimming World was featured in the Connecticut Post for its ranking of the world's fastest swimmers in the 400-meter freestyle heading to the 2020 Summer Olympics including Kieran Smith.
- Swimming World's coverage of potentially manipulated results at a swim meet in Uzbekistan was highlighted by Reuters in July 2021 ahead of the 2020 Summer Olympics.
