= Aoi Masuda =

Japanese swimmer (born 1996)

Personal information
- Nationality: Japanese
- Born: 20 June 1996 (age 29); Kurashiki, Japan

Sport
- Sport: Swimming

Aoi Masuda (増田葵, Masuda Aoi, born 20 June 1996) is a Japanese swimmer. She competed in the women's 4 × 200 metre freestyle relay at the 2020 Summer Olympics.
