= Paige Madden =

American swimmer (born 1998)

Personal information
- Nationality: United States
- Born: October 22, 1998 (age 27) Mobile, Alabama, U.S.
- Height: 5 ft 11 in (180 cm)

Sport
- Sport: Swimming
- Strokes: Freestyle
- College team: University of Virginia
Medal record
Women's swimming
Representing the United States
Olympic Games
| Silver medal – second place | 2020 Tokyo | 4×200 m freestyle |
| Silver medal – second place | 2024 Paris | 4×200 m freestyle |
| Bronze medal – third place | 2024 Paris | 800 m freestyle |
World Championships (SC)
| Gold medal – first place | 2024 Budapest | 4×200 m freestyle |
| Silver medal – second place | 2021 Abu Dhabi | 4×200 m freestyle |
| Bronze medal – third place | 2021 Abu Dhabi | 200 m freestyle |
Pan American Games
| Gold medal – first place | 2023 Santiago | 400 m freestyle |
| Gold medal – first place | 2023 Santiago | 800 m freestyle |
| Gold medal – first place | 2023 Santiago | 4×200 m freestyle |
| Silver medal – second place | 2023 Santiago | mixed 4×100 m freestyle |
Representing the Virginia Cavaliers
NCAA Championships
| Gold medal – first place | 2021 Greensboro | 200 y freestyle |
| Gold medal – first place | 2021 Greensboro | 500 y freestyle |
| Gold medal – first place | 2021 Greensboro | 1650 y freestyle |
| Gold medal – first place | 2021 Greensboro | 4×200 y freestyle |
| Silver medal – second place | 2019 Austin | 500 y freestyle |
| Silver medal – second place | 2021 Greensboro | 4×100 y freestyle |

Paige Madden (born October 22, 1998) is an American swimmer who won a silver medal at the 2020 Summer Olympics, and a silver medal in the 4x200m freestyle relay, joined by Claire Weinstein, Katie Ledecky, and Erin Gemmell at the 2024 Paris Olympics.

== Career ==
Madden was born to Ellen and Mike Madden in 1998, and she has one brother.

Madden is from Mobile, Alabama, and attended UMS-Wright Preparatory School. She set Alabama high school state swimming records in the 50 y freestyle, 100 y freestyle, 200 y freestyle, 500 y freestyle, 100 y butterfly, 100 y backstroke, and 200 y individual medley.

Madden attended the University of Virginia and joined their swimming team during her freshman year of 2017–18.

=== 2019 ===
Madden competed at the 2019 NCAA Division I Championships in March. She won the silver medal in the 500 y freestyle and finished fifth in the 200 y freestyle.

In July, Madden competed at the 2019 Summer Universiade. She won the silver medal in the 200 m freestyle and a gold medal in the women's 4 × 200 m freestyle relay.

In August, Madden competed at the 2019 U.S. National Championships and won the silver medal in the 200 m freestyle.

=== 2020 ===
Madden was named the Atlantic Coast Conference Swimmer of the Year in 2020.

=== 2021 ===
In March, Madden competed at the 2021 NCAA Division I Championships, the final meet of her NCAA career. She won gold medals in the 200 y freestyle, 500 y freestyle, and 1650 y freestyle, breaking the University of Virginia school record in the 200. Madden also won a gold medal in the women's 4 × 200 y freestyle relay and a silver medal in the women's 4 × 100 y freestyle relay. She helped Virginia win the team championship. Madden won her second straight ACC Swimmer of the Year award.

In June, Madden competed at the 2020 U.S. Olympic trials. She won the silver medal in the 400 m freestyle and the bronze medal in the 200 m freestyle. Madden made the Olympic team.

In July, Madden competed at the 2020 Summer Olympics. She finished seventh in the 400 m freestyle. She then swam in the heats and the final of the women's 4 × 200 m freestyle relay, winning a silver medal.

From August to September, Madden competed in the 2021 International Swimming League as a member of the Tokyo Frog Kings.

Madden competed at the 2021 World Championships (25 m) in December. She won the bronze medal in the 200 m freestyle and then finished fifth in the 400 m freestyle. Madden swam in the heats and the final of the women's 4 × 200 m freestyle relay, winning a silver medal. She swam in the heats of the women's 4 × 100 m medley relay, and the American team finished fourth in the final.

=== 2022 ===
In April, Madden competed at the 2022 U.S. International Team Trials while dealing with health problems. Afterward, she took a break from competitive swimming for several months.

=== 2023 ===
Madden competed at the 2023 U.S. National Championships in June. She finished fifth in the 400 m freestyle.

In October, Madden competed at the 2023 Pan American Games. She won gold medals in the 400 m freestyle and 800 m freestyle. Madden also won a gold medal in the women's 4 × 200 m freestyle relay and a silver medal in the mixed 4 × 100 m freestyle relay.

=== 2024 ===
She competed at the 2024 Paris Olympics in the 4x200m freestyle relay, joined by Claire Weinstein, Katie Ledecky, and Erin Gemmell. With a collective time of 7:40.86, the team won the silver medal. She also won a bronze medal in the 800 m freestyle for her first individual Olympic medal, with a personal best time of 8:13.00, finishing more than 1/2 a second behind Australian star Ariarne Titmus, and just under 2 seconds behind teammate and gold medal winner Katie Ledecky.

== Awards and honors ==
- Golden Goggle Awards, Perseverance Award: 2024
