= Phoebe Bacon =

American swimmer (born 2002)

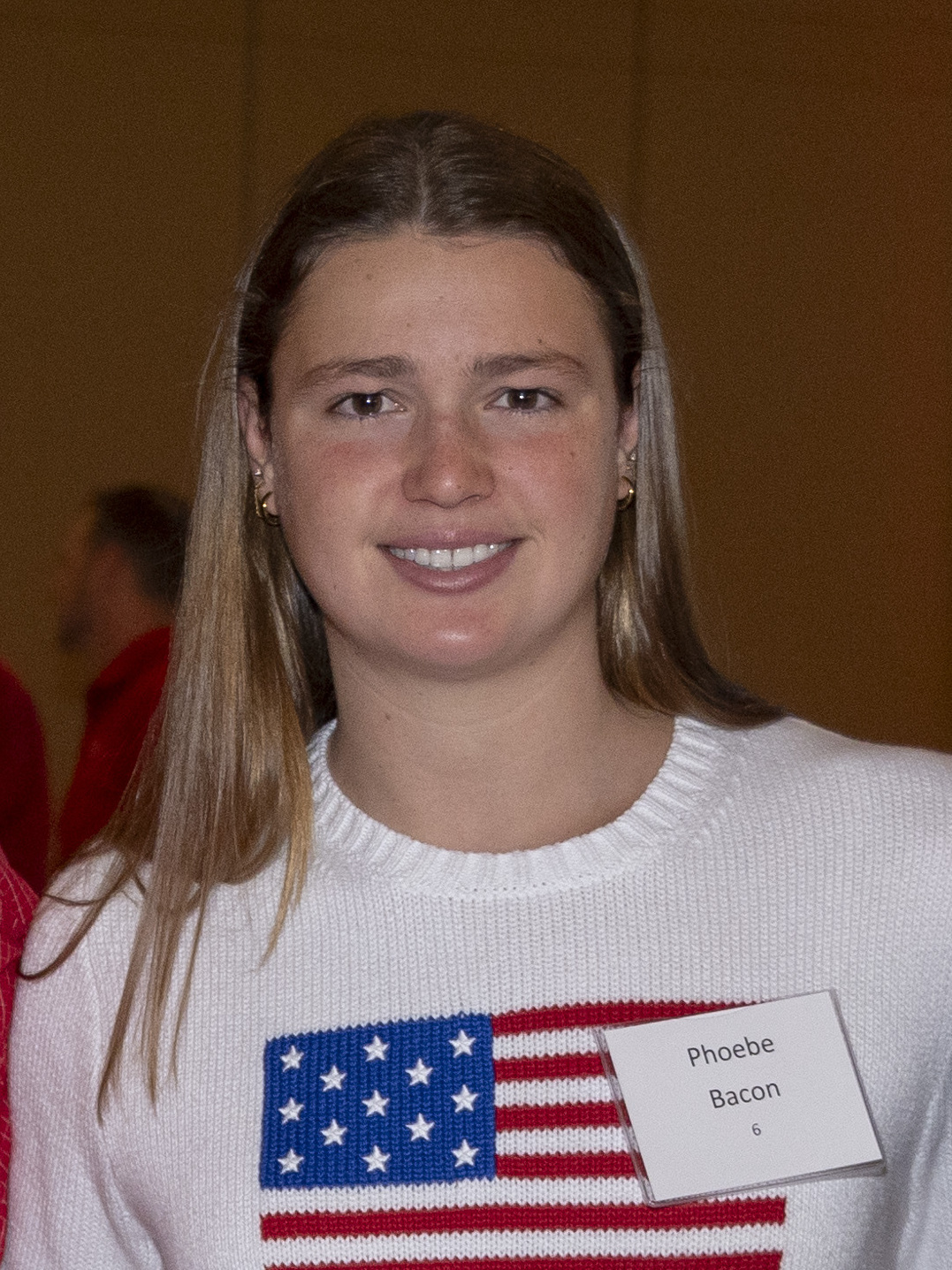
- Bacon in 2024

Personal information
- Full name: Phoebe Bacon
- Born: August 12, 2002 (age 24) Chevy Chase, Maryland, U.S.
- Height: 1.778 m (5 ft 10 in)

Sport
- Country: United States
- Sport: Swimming
- Strokes: Backstroke
- Club: Nations Capital Swim Club
- College team: University of Wisconsin–Madison
Medal record
Women's swimming
Representing United States
World Championships (LC)
Silver medal – second place	2022 Budapest	200 m backstroke
World Championships (SC)
Gold medal – first place	2024 Budapest	4×100 m freestyle
Gold medal – first place	2024 Budapest	4×200 m freestyle
Pan American Games
Gold medal – first place	2019 Lima	100 m backstroke
Gold medal – first place	2019 Lima	4×100 m medley
Junior Pan Pacific Championships
Gold medal – first place	2018 Suva	100 m backstroke
Gold medal – first place	2018 Suva	4×100 m mixed medley
Gold medal – first place	2018 Suva	4×100 m medley

Phoebe Bacon (born August 12, 2002) is an American swimmer. Bacon is a two time Olympian. In 2021, she qualified for the US Olympic Swimming Team, placing second in the 200m backstroke at the Olympic Team Trials. On June 21, 2024, Bacon finished second to secure her spot on the Paris Olympics team. At Paris, Bacon placed 4th in the 200m Backstroke. She holds the 5th fastest 100 m (long course) Backstroke swim in the world for the 2019 calendar year, and was a member of the gold medal-winning 4 × 100 m medley relay team at the 2019 Pan American Games. She also won three gold medals at the 2018 Junior Pan Pacific Championships, and was a gold medalist in the 100m back at 2019 Pan American Games. Additionally, she was a gold medalist in the 100m back at the 2019 Toyota U.S. Open, beating the world record holding Regan Smith.

== Career ==
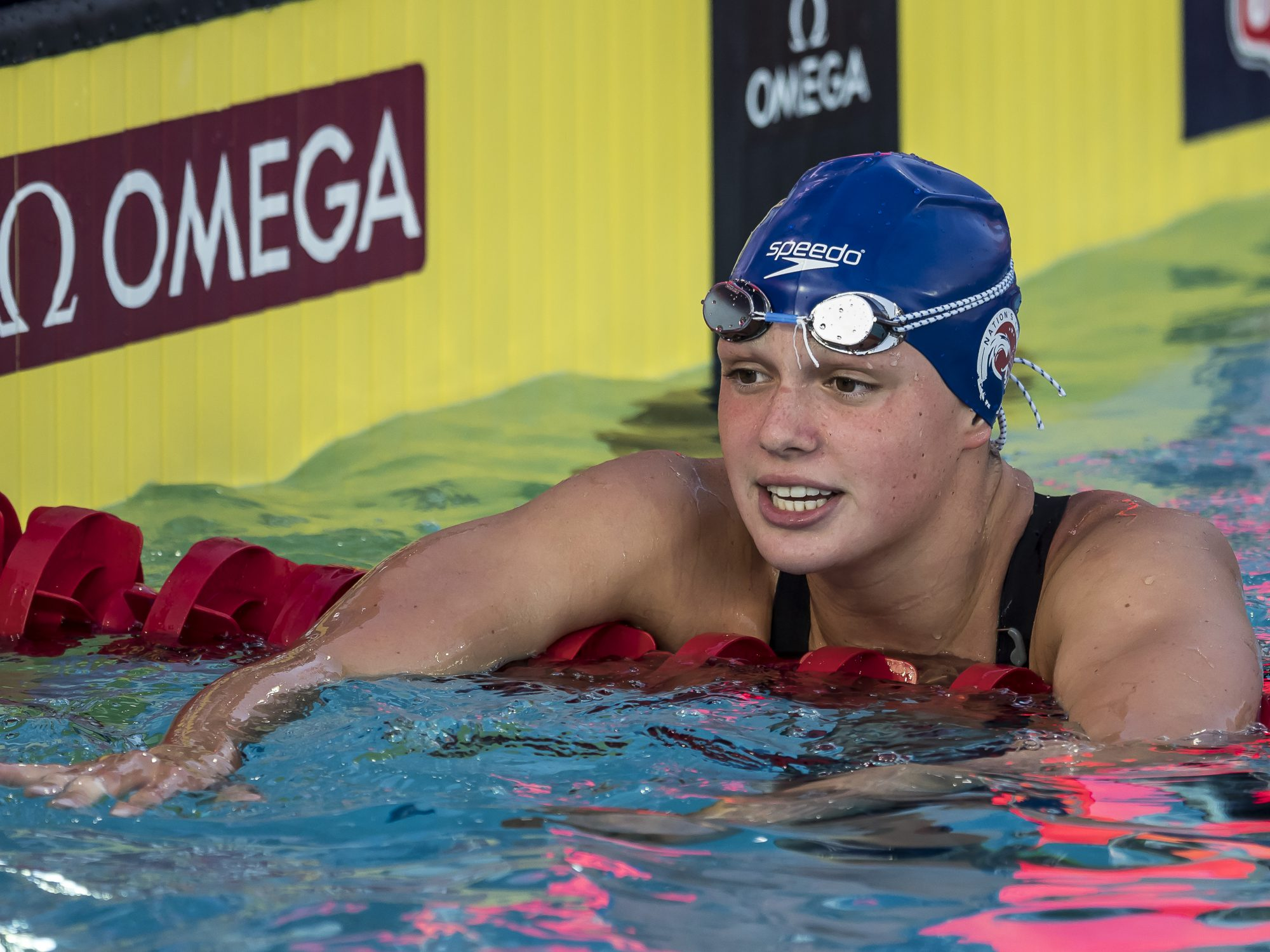
Bacon competing in 2019

Bacon began swimming during the summer at the age of 3 for the Tallyho Foxes, and later joined Nation's Capital Swim Club, the same club as Katie Ledecky, at the American University site. Under the Silver coach Ian Rowe, Bacon qualified for the 2016 US Olympic Trials, at the age of 14. During the 2017 season, Phoebe moved up to the Gold I group, where she was coached by Timothy Kelly Jr. On April 21, 2019, she verbally committed to swim for the University of Wisconsin, where she currently swims.

== Personal life ==
Phoebe was raised in Bethesda, MD and is the daughter of Timothy J. Bacon and Philippa Bacon. Phoebe has 3 siblings.
