= 2020 United States Olympic trials (swimming) =

- Host city: Omaha, Nebraska, U.S.
- Date(s): Wave I: June 4 – 7, 2021; Wave II: June 13 – 20, 2021
- Venue: CHI Health Center Omaha
- Events: 28 (men: 14; women: 14)

The 2020 USA Swimming Olympic trials was held at CHI Health Center Omaha in Omaha, Nebraska, for a fourth consecutive time. Originally scheduled from June 21 to 28, 2020, it was rescheduled to June 4 to 7, 2021, (wave I) and June 13 to 20, 2021, (wave II) due to the COVID-19 pandemic resulting in the postponement of the 2020 Summer Olympics to 2021. The meet served as the national championships in swimming for the United States. Those qualifying competed for the United States in swimming at the 2020 Summer Olympics in Tokyo, Japan.

== Qualification criteria ==
A maximum of 52 swimmers (26 of each sex, not including open water swimmers) were chosen for the 2020 Summer Olympics from Wave II. To make the Olympic team, a swimmer must place in the top two in one of the fourteen individual events. To be considered for the U.S. 4×100-meter and 4×200-meter freestyle relay teams, a swimmer must place in the top six in the 100-meter and 200-meter freestyle, respectively. Swimmers must have achieved a time standard to be eligible to compete in the U.S. Olympic trials:

Event	Men	Women	Men	Women
	Wave I		Wave II	
50 m freestyle	23.19	25.99	22.71	25.65
100 m freestyle	50.49	56.49	49.74	55.56
200 m freestyle	1:50.79	2:01.69	1:49.65	2:00.24
400 m freestyle	3:57.29	4:16.89	3:54.21	4:13.28
800 m freestyle	8:12.99	8:48.09	8:08.95	8:44.01
1500 m freestyle	15:44.89	16:49.19	15:35.69	16:44.60
100 m backstroke	56.59	1:02.69	55.51	1:01.49
200 m backstroke	2:02.99	2:14.69	2:00.81	2:12.94
100 m breaststroke	1:03.29	1:10.99	1:01.97	1:09.55
200 m breaststroke	2:17.89	2:33.29	2:15.28	2:30.49
100 m butterfly	54.19	1:00.69	53.37	59.59
200 m butterfly	2:01.19	2:14.59	1:59.63	2:12.56
200 m individual medley	2:04.09	2:17.39	2:03.02	2:15.26
400 m individual medley	4:25.99	4:51.79	4:23.24	4:47.72

- Information retrieved from USA Swimming.

== Two wave structure ==
In January 2021, USA Swimming announced its decision to break the Olympic trials into two meets called waves. This decision was made in part to follow social distancing protocols and keep attendees, athletes, and workers safer during the COVID-19 pandemic. Each wave had a different set of qualification time standards. The time standards took effect January 28, 2021 and an initial qualifying period for both waves ended May 30, 2021. Wave I swimmers who met the time standards for Wave II at the Wave I meet and finished first or second in their event qualified to compete at the Wave II meet. Finals for Wave I were conducted in an A-final and B-final format.

A total of 50 swimmers from Wave I qualified to compete in Wave II. The first swimmer who swam in the Wave I meet and advanced to a second swim, semifinal or final, at the Wave II meet was Heather MacCausland in the women's 100-meter breaststroke on June 14, 2021. The most watched YouTube video from the entire Olympic trials came from Wave I not Wave II. It was a clip of Kayla Han winning the B-final of the women's 400-meter individual medley and breaking a USA Swimming national age group record in the process.

Between Wave I and Wave II, 2,285 individuals competed at the 2020 Olympic trials, a decrease of over 700 swimmers from the 2016 Olympic trials. As a whole, proportionally fewer Wave I swimmers and proportionally more Wave II swimmers swam faster than their seed times compared to swimmers at the 2016 Olympic trials.

== Events ==
The meet featured twenty-eight individual events in a long course (50-meter) pool—fourteen events for men and fourteen events for women. Events 200 meters and shorter were held with preliminaries, semifinals and finals, while events 400 meters and longer were held with preliminaries and finals. Semifinals featured sixteen swimmers in two heats; the finals included eight swimmers in a single heat. Preliminaries were seeded with ten lanes. Event order, which mimicked that of the 2020 Olympics, with the exception of the Olympic relay events, were the following for Wave II:

Date	Sunday June 13, 2021	Monday June 14, 2021	Tuesday June 15, 2021	Wednesday June 16, 2021
M o r n i n g	Men's 400 IM (heats); Women's 100 butterfly (heats); Men's 400 freestyle (heats); Women's 400 IM (heats); Men's 100 breaststroke (heats)	Women's 100 backstroke (heats); Men's 200 freestyle (heats); Women's 100 breaststroke (heats); Men's 100 backstroke (heats); Women's 400 freestyle (heats)	Women's 200 freestyle (heats); Men's 200 butterfly (heats); Women's 200 IM (heats); Women's 1500 freestyle (heats)	Men's 100 freestyle (heats); Women's 200 butterfly (heats); Men's 200 breaststroke (heats); Men's 800 freestyle (heats)
E v e n i n g	Men's 400 IM (final); Women's 100 butterfly (semi-finals); Men's 400 freestyle (final); Women's 400 IM (final); Men's 100 breaststroke (semi-finals)	Women's 100 butterfly (final); Men's 200 freestyle (semi-finals); Women's 100 breaststroke (semi-finals); Men's 100 breaststroke (final); Women's 400 freestyle (final); Men's 100 backstroke (semi-finals); Women's 100 backstroke (semi-finals)	Women's 200 freestyle (semi-finals); Men's 200 freestyle (final); Women's 100 backstroke (final); Men's 100 backstroke (final); Women's 100 breaststroke (final); Men's 200 butterfly (semi-finals); Women's 200 IM (semi-finals)	Men's 100 freestyle (semi-finals); Women's 200 freestyle (final); Men's 200 butterfly (final); Women's 200 butterfly (semi-finals); Men's 200 breaststroke (semi-finals); Women's 200 IM (final); Women's 1500 freestyle (final)
Date	Thursday June 17, 2021	Friday June 18, 2021	Saturday June 19, 2021	Sunday June 20, 2021
M o r n i n g	Women's 100 freestyle (heats); Men's 200 backstroke (heats); Women's 200 breaststroke (heats); Men's 200 IM (heats)	Women's 800 freestyle (heats); Men's 100 butterfly (heats); Women's 200 backstroke (heats)	Men's 50 freestyle (heats); Women's 50 freestyle (heats); Men's 1500 freestyle (heats)	No morning session.
E v e n i n g	Men's 800 freestyle (final); Men's 200 breaststroke (final); Women's 100 freestyle (semi-finals); Men's 200 backstroke (semi-finals); Women's 200 butterfly (final); Men's 100 freestyle (final); Women's 200 breaststroke (semi-finals); Men's 200 IM (semi-finals)	Women's 200 breaststroke (final); Men's 200 backstroke (final); Women's 200 backstroke (semi-finals); Men's 200 IM (final); Women's 100 freestyle (final); Men's 100 butterfly (semi-finals)	Men's 100 butterfly (final); Women's 200 backstroke (final); Women's 800 freestyle (final); Men's 50 freestyle (semi-finals); Women's 50 freestyle (semi-finals)	Men's 50 freestyle (final); Women's 50 freestyle (final); Men's 1500 freestyle (final)

== U.S. Olympic Team ==
The following swimmers qualified to compete at the 2020 Summer Olympics (for pool events):

=== Men ===
Michael Andrew, Zach Apple, Hunter Armstrong, Bowe Becker, Gunnar Bentz, Michael Brinegar, Patrick Callan, Brooks Curry, Caeleb Dressel, Nic Fink, Bobby Finke, Townley Haas, Zach Harting, Chase Kalisz, Drew Kibler, Jay Litherland, Bryce Mefford, Jake Mitchell, Ryan Murphy, Blake Pieroni, Andrew Seliskar, Tom Shields, Kieran Smith, Andrew Wilson.

=== Women ===
Phoebe Bacon, Erika Brown, Claire Curzan, Catie DeLoof, Kate Douglass, Hali Flickinger, Brooke Forde, Katie Grimes, Natalie Hinds, Torri Huske, Lydia Jacoby, Lilly King, Annie Lazor, Katie Ledecky, Paige Madden, Simone Manuel, Katie McLaughlin, Allison Schmitt, Bella Sims, Regan Smith, Olivia Smoliga, Erica Sullivan, Alex Walsh, Abbey Weitzeil, Emma Weyant, Rhyan White.

U.S. Olympic Team members in open water swimming events:

=== Men ===
Jordan Wilimovsky.

=== Women ===
Haley Anderson, Ashley Twichell.

== Results ==
Key: Highlighted swimmers achieved the qualification conditions to be included in the Olympic team in that respective event.

=== Men's events ===
Event	Gold		Silver		Bronze	
50 m freestyle	Caeleb Dressel	21.04 US	Michael Andrew	21.48	Nathan Adrian	21.73
100 m freestyle	Caeleb Dressel	47.39 =US	Zach Apple	47.72	Blake Pieroni	48.16
200 m freestyle	Kieran Smith	1:45.29	Townley Haas	1:45.66	Drew Kibler	1:45.92
400 m freestyle	Kieran Smith	3:44.86	Jake Mitchell	3:48.17^{[a]}	Ross Dant	3:48.30
800 m freestyle	Bobby Finke	7:48.22	Michael Brinegar	7:49.94	Ross Dant	7:50.66
1,500 m freestyle	Bobby Finke	14:46.06	Michael Brinegar	15:00.87	Jordan Wilimovsky	15:05.29
100 m backstroke	Ryan Murphy	52.33	Hunter Armstrong	52.48	Shaine Casas	52.76
200 m backstroke	Ryan Murphy	1:54.20	Bryce Mefford	1:54.79	Austin Katz	1:55.86
100 m breaststroke	Michael Andrew	58.73	Andrew Wilson	58.74	Nic Fink	58.80
200 m breaststroke	Nicolas Fink	2:07.55	Andrew Wilson	2:08.32	Will Licon	2:08.50
100 m butterfly	Caeleb Dressel	49.87	Tom Shields	51.19	Luca Urlando	51.64
200 m butterfly	Zach Harting	1:55.06	Gunnar Bentz	1:55.34	Luca Urlando	1:55.43
200 m IM	Michael Andrew	1:55.44	Chase Kalisz	1:56.97	Kieran Smith	1:57.23
400 m IM	Chase Kalisz	4:09.09	Jay Litherland	4:10.33	Carson Foster	4:10.86

^{a} Jake Mitchell did not meet the qualifying standard (3:46.78) in the final, nor had he achieved the time elsewhere within the Olympic qualifying period (March 1, 2019 to June 27, 2021). Since the latter had only been achieved by the 11th-place finisher, USA Swimming organised a time trial for the 2nd to 10th place finishers, which was held 2 days after the initial final. Mitchell recorded 3:45.86 to win the time trial, which qualified him for the Olympic team.

=== Women's events ===
Event	Gold		Silver		Bronze	
50 m freestyle	Simone Manuel	24.29	Abbey Weitzeil	24.30	Torri Huske	24.46
100 m freestyle	Abbey Weitzeil	53.53	Erika Brown	53.59	Olivia Smoliga	53.63
200 m freestyle	Katie Ledecky	1:55.11	Allison Schmitt	1:56.79	Paige Madden	1:56.80
400 m freestyle	Katie Ledecky	4:01.27	Paige Madden	4:04.86	Leah Smith	4:06.27
800 m freestyle	Katie Ledecky	8:14.62	Katie Grimes	8:20.36	Haley Anderson	8:20.51
1,500 m freestyle	Katie Ledecky	15:40.50	Erica Sullivan	15:51.18	Katie Grimes	15:52.12
100 m backstroke	Regan Smith	58.35	Rhyan White	58.60	Olivia Smoliga	58.72
200 m backstroke	Rhyan White	2:05.73	Phoebe Bacon	2:06.46	Regan Smith	2:06.79
100 m breaststroke	Lilly King	1:04.79	Lydia Jacoby	1:05.28	Annie Lazor	1:05.60
200 m breaststroke	Annie Lazor	2:21.07	Lilly King	2:21.75	Emily Escobedo	2:22.64
100 m butterfly	Torri Huske	55.66 AM, US	Claire Curzan	56.43	Kate Douglass	56.56
200 m butterfly	Hali Flickinger	2:05.85 US	Regan Smith	2:06.99	Charlotte Hook	2:07.92
200 m IM	Alex Walsh	2:09.30	Kate Douglass	2:09.32	Madisyn Cox	2:09.34
400 m IM	Emma Weyant	4:33.81	Hali Flickinger	4:33.96	Melanie Margalis	4:34.08

== Olympics freestyle relay qualifiers ==
Key: Highlighted swimmers achieved the qualification conditions to be included in the Olympic team in that respective relay event based on their
performance in the corresponding 100 meter or 200 meter freestyle individual event. The qualifying rules for the 2020 Olympics specified that a country could not have more than 12 swimmers, men and women combined, that would race only in relays; of the four sixth-place finishers, Held ranked lowest in his event in USA Swimming's world rankings, so he was left off the team.

=== Men ===
Place →	1st	2nd	3rd	4th	5th	6th	7th	8th
4×100 m freestyle	Caeleb Dressel; 47.39	Zach Apple; 47.72	Blake Pieroni; 48.16	Brooks Curry; 48.19	Bowe Becker; 48.22	Ryan Held; 48.46	Brett Pinfold; 48.47	Coleman Stewart; 48.51
4×200 m freestyle	Kieran Smith; 1:45.29	Townley Haas; 1:45.66	Drew Kibler; 1:45.92	Andrew Seliskar; 1:46.34	Zach Apple; 1:46.45	Patrick Callan; 1:46.49	Blake Pieroni; 1:46.57	Carson Foster; 1:46.67

=== Women ===
Place →	1st	2nd	3rd	4th	5th	6th	7th	8th
4×100 m freestyle	Abbey Weitzeil; 53.53	Erika Brown; 53.59	Olivia Smoliga; 53.63	Natalie Hinds; 53.84	Catie DeLoof; 53.87	Allison Schmitt; 54.12	Kate Douglass; 54.17	Linnea Mack; 54.32
4×200 m freestyle	Katie Ledecky; 1:55.11	Allison Schmitt; 1:56.79	Paige Madden; 1:56.80	Katie McLaughlin; 1:57.16	Bella Sims; 1:57.53	Brooke Forde; 1:57.61	Gabby DeLoof; 1:57.86	Leah Smith; 1:58.13

== Television coverage and viewership ==
Two national television networks covered the US Olympic trials in swimming in the United States, NBC and NBCSN. NBCSN aired the heats later the same day and NBC aired the finals and some of the semifinals same day. This coverage was part of the NBC Olympics television and digital programming covering the U.S. Olympic Team trials in various sports that set a new record in number of hours of coverage of the Olympic trials for all sports in the United States at 85.25 hours.

Sunday coverage of the U.S. Olympic Team trials in swimming on NBC made it into the top 20 most viewed programs for the day. For the top five most viewed days of U.S. Olympic Team trials across all sports, the swimming team trials had one day make it in the top five along with two days from team trials in track and field and two days from gymnastics team trials.
