= USA Swimming =

U.S. national governing body for competitive swimming

- Logo
- Sport: Swimming
- Jurisdiction: National
- Membership: 380,000
- Abbreviation: USA-S
- Founded: 1981
- Affiliation: United States Aquatic Sports
- Headquarters: Colorado Springs, Colorado, U.S.
- President: Kevin M. Ring
- Chairperson: Natalie Coughlin-Hall
- CEO: Kevin M. Ring
- Sponsor: Fluidra; Omega SA; OneAmerica Financial Partners; Speedo; Toyota; TYR Sport

Official website
- www.usaswimming.org
- (United States)

USA Swimming is the national governing body for competitive swimming in the United States. It is charged with selecting the United States Olympic Swimming team and any other teams that officially represent the United States, as well as the overall organization and operation of the sport within the country, in accordance with the Olympic and Amateur Sports Act. The national headquarters of USA Swimming is located at the United States Olympic Training Center in Colorado Springs, Colorado.

== History ==
USA Swimming was originally called United States Swimming (USS) upon its departure from the AAU. Thus, there are several terms used to describe the organization at different times. These terms are: USA Swimming, USA-S, United States Swimming, USS, and US Swimming. Prior to the existence of USS, the AAU, or the Amateur Athletic Union, served as the governing body for swimming and other sports across the country.

=== Amateur Athletic Union ===
The Amateur Athletic Union (AAU) was the official organization responsible for the running of all amateur sports in the United States, established in 1888. The AAU was officially charged with the organization and operation of many sports in the US. During this time, swimming was one of the committees in the organization and was not an independent governing body.

The Amateur Sports Act of 1978 enabled the governance of sports in the US by organizations other than the AAU. This act made each sport set up its own national governing body (NGB). Each of these governing bodies would be part of the United States Olympic Committee, but would not be run by the committee. Thus, United States Swimming was born. From 1978 to 1980, the official responsibilities of governing the sport were transferred from the AAU Swimming Committee to the new United States Swimming. Bill Lippman, the last head of the Swimming Committee, and Ross Wales, the first president of United States Swimming, worked together to ease the transition. This process was made more interesting because the United States boycotted the 1980 Summer Olympics and, during this time, the leadership of the sport was in flux.

The AAU still holds several aquatic events, but it is no longer the official governing body of the sport.

=== Presidents ===
- Bill Lippman – Last Head of swimming committee in the AAU
- Ross Wales (1980–1984) – First standalone President of USA Swimming
- Sandra Baldwin (1984–1986)
- Carol Zaleski (1986–1990, 1994–1998)
- Bill Maxson (1990–1994)
- Dale Neuburger (1998–2002)
- Ron Van Pool (2002–2006)
- Jim Wood (2006–2010)
- Bruce Stratton (2010–2014)
- Jim Sheehan (2014–2018)
- Bob Vincent (2018)
- Tim Hinchey (2017–2024)
- Kevin M. Ring (2025–current)

=== Chief executives ===
- Ray Essick (1980–1997)
- Chuck Wielgus (1997–2017)
- Tim Hinchey (2017–2024)
- Kevin M. Ring (2025–current)

== Location ==
When it was part of the AAU to 1981, USA Swimming had its headquarters in Indianapolis, Indiana. In 1981, USA Swimming moved to its present-day location in Colorado Springs. At the time of the 1981 move, it had four staff members.

In 1997, work was completed on the official USA Swimming Headquarters, which is currently the official home of USA Swimming.

Through the national headquarters, the organization provides various programs and services to its members, supporters, affiliates and the interested public. This includes educational programs, fund-raising activities, general information, publications, resources, and sports medicine programs, all relating to the sport of swimming.

== Organizational structure ==
There are several parts and levels that make up USA Swimming. There is the national governing body (national) level, the zone (regional) level, and the local swimming committee (local/state) level.

=== The National Governing Body ===
The National Governing Body (NGB) of United States Swimming is an extension of the United States Olympic Committee. While all of the separate swim teams, LSC's, and Zones do not officially make up the NGB, they are all members and are subject to the laws of the NGB.

The NGB is made up of both staff members of USA Swimming and volunteer members of the board. The office of the President is the head of the board and is responsible for the overall direction of USA Swimming. The chief executive is the head of the staff located at the national headquarters in Colorado Springs at the Olympic Training Center. The chief executive is responsible for the day-to-day operations of the organization at the national level.

The NGB is responsible for nearly all aspects of USA Swimming, and swimming in the United States in general. Its most important responsibility is to set the rules for the sport in the United States. These rules are guided by the international governing body for aquatic sports (World Aquatics). World Aquatics makes the rules that are to be followed at all international level meets. USA Swimming follows accordingly to make the rules of USA Swimming match the rules of World Aquatics; however, it does not have to. In theory, an NGB could make its rules whatever it wanted and have all national level meets and below follow those rules, but it would not have jurisdiction over international level meets held within the borders of the United States, and such a meet would have to follow World Aquatics rules.

=== The Local Swimming Committee ===
The Local Swimming Committee (LSC) is the local level of USA Swimming. Each LSC is a separate entity, with each being an individual member of USA Swimming, although all act on behalf of USA Swimming on the local level. LSCs are the local administrative organization responsible for the registration, support and governance of the USA Swimming member swim clubs in their designated region. Over 3,100 swim clubs across the US are registered with USA Swimming through their respective LSCs.

The LSC gives USA Swimming sanctions to swimming meets in their area. A sanction from the LSC allows the meet to be run under USA Swimming rules. The LSC is responsible for enforcing these rules at the meet. The LSC does this by training officials for the meet. These officials are typically parents of swimmers and volunteers. The technical swimming rules for USA Swimming are the same for all LSCs as mandated by USA Swimming. This allows an official in one LSC to officiate in another LSC without having to learn a new set of rules. This is able to be done because while each LSC may have its own set of rules they are not different regarding the actual strokes.

An LSC is typically responsible for an entire state; however, several bigger states (e.g. California, Texas, Pennsylvania, among others) have multiple LSCs within their boundaries. The size of the LSCs is supposed to be roughly the same and allow for easier travel between meets. The result is that while borders tend to follow state borders, this is not a rule. There are currently 59 LSCs in the country. The largest Local Swimming Committee by membership is Southern California Swimming, with approximately 20,000 swimmers. The LSC encompasses Las Vegas, Los Angeles, Long Beach, and Santa Barbara. The largest by area is Alaska Swimming, which encompasses the entire state of Alaska, but it is one of the smallest by membership, with fewer than 2,500 swimmers registered. The smallest by area is Potomac Valley Swimming, which includes Washington D.C., parts of Northern Virginia, and Montgomery County and Prince George's County in Maryland. However, it is one of the largest by membership, with around 12,000 athletes registered.

== Meets ==
There are several different types and levels of meets, all but the very top level directed by individual clubs and the Local Swimming Committee. The following is a list of the types of meets, listed from lowest and most common level to highest and least common level.

=== Dual Meet, Double Dual, Triangular, Quadrangular, etc. ===
A dual meet is a meet where each individual event is ranked based on how individual swimmers on a team swim. It is generally limited to 2 teams, but different variations can have more. In a dual meet, there is almost always a limit to the number of events that a certain person can swim, usually four, and to the number of swimmers that a certain team can enter. meet entries close up when the maximum number of people have entered. Generally, there is only 1 heat in each event and each team alternates lanes so that each team swims in half the pool, regardless of how fast each swimmer is. While this style of meet is generally uncommon for individual USA Swimming clubs, it is by far the most common of high school (NFHS) swimming, YMCA swimming, college (NCAA) swimming, and summer league swimming. Meets of this variety are almost always a low level meet because entry time standards are almost never applied to enter the meet. It can, however, be rather high level when both teams involved are very fast and have exclusively high level swimmers, as is the case with college swimming.

=== Invitational Meet ===
An invitational meet is a meet with many more teams and swimmers than a dual meet. The term "Invitational" comes from the fact that for a team to attend this type of meet, a team had to be invited to attend from the host team, but now is a general catch-all term for this style of meet (although there are still occasional invitation-only meets.) Meets of this variety generally have hundreds of swimmers, many teams, and many different events. Within the definition of an invitational meet, there are dozens of different styles of scoring and placing but the standard method is described here. All levels of swimming use invitational style meets at least once during their season (usually as a championship meet of all the clubs in a league), but the clubs of USA Swimming use this meet almost exclusively since there are very few leagues in USA Swimming and it acts as one giant league itself. Most meets of this style have no limits as to the number of swimmers that a team can enter, and only limit the number of times a swimmer can swim in order to make the flow of the meet manageable. Meets of this style can be at any level of swimming since all of the higher level meets use this style of meet with just more restrictive rules applied. Meets of this style usually do not have entry time standards, but can have them to either reduce the size of the meet, or raise the competition level.

=== LSC Championships ===
Each Local Swimming Committee (LSC) is mandated to have a season ending championships twice a year for both Age Group (younger) and Senior (no age requirement) swimmers. Most LSC's split these up into two separate meets. The meet style is an invitational meet open only to club teams within the LSC. Almost universally, entry time standards are applied so that only the top level swimmer of the LSC can attend; only a few of the smaller LSCs do not have a time standard. Each LSC sets their own time standards (due to LSC size differences), so the competition level of the meet is not exactly the same across the country. Normally, this style meet is a prelim/final format. Common age groups are 10 and under, 11–12, 13–14, 15 and over, also known as seniors.

=== Zone/Sectional Championship ===
As stated before, there are four zones and 59 LSCs in the country. While the LSC championship is a high level meet, the Zone/Sectional Championships are even higher. These meets are also of the invitational format, but the entry time standards are even higher so that only the fastest swimmers of Zones qualify. Zone and Sectional meets are of the same competition level, but serve different purposes. Zone meets are for age group swimmers and Sectional meets are for Senior swimmers. While the intention is to have one champion for the whole Zone, this is generally not possible because to have a meet of that high of a competition level, there would be very little difference between this level and the next level, so the entry times can only be made so fast. Thus, there are sometimes too many swimmers qualifying for this meet to have only a single meet in a Zone. Currently, the Central States Zone is the only one that has more than one Zone Championship meet (Age Group swimmers), and all four zones have multiple Sectional Championships (Senior swimmers). After Zone meets for age group swimmers some may qualify for Junior Nationals.

=== Pro Swim Series ===
The Pro Swim Series (PSS), formally known as the Speedo Grand Prix, is a series of 7 meets held throughout the season. Held in either Short Course Yards (SCY) or Long Course Meters (LCM). Swimmers race in both Olympic and non-Olympic distances, but only receive points for Olympic distances. First place receives 5 points and $1,000. Second place receives 3 points and $600. Third place receives 1 point and $200. The swimmer that accumulates the most points by the end of the series wins a $10,000 bonus. Any swimmer of any nationality can compete in the PSS but are not eligible to some of the prizes. In 2017 the title sponsor of the PSS, Arena, did not want to be the title rights holder anymore, so TYR took over as title sponsor starting in 2018.

=== National Championship/US Open ===
There is only 1 National Championship meet at the conclusion of each season across the country. The National Championships are also of the invitational meet format and offer extremely high level competition. Only a very small percentage of people who ever swim will make it to this high a level of competition. This meet is generally used to determine the US National Team for various international level meets each year, but is not used to determine the US Olympic Team. Currently, there are 2 National Championships each year, but the Spring Championships have traditionally been of a significantly lower level of competition than the Summer Championships, as the Spring Championships are so close to NCAA Championships that Spring Championships are rarely used as a selection meet for national teams.

In many other sports, the National Championship of the sport is known as the "US Open" and while swimming did have a very high national level meet by that name each year, it was just a high level meet and not a national championship meet. This specific meet was ended in 2006 and was replaced with a reformulated Spring/Winter National Championship. Since there is no "US Open" meet of the old format, the National Championships (specifically Summer '08) have begun to be called the "US Open" to bring it in line with the nomenclature of other sports.

=== US Olympic Trials ===
The Olympic Trials are held once every 4 years. Since this meet offers such a coveted prize (a spot on the US Olympic Team) it never fails to attract the absolute fastest in the sport of swimming in the United States. Because of this, the entry time standards are even faster than the National Championships. However, even though this is a faster meet and would actually offer a truer indication of who is the fastest swimmer in the United States, the winner of each event in this meet is not officially considered a National Champion and this meet is NOT held in place of the National Championships every 4 years (although the Nationals are generally not held when the Olympic Trials occur, or other selection trials). However, for 2008, the winners of the Olympic Trials were indeed officially be a National Champion with the trials meet taking the place of the National Championship meet for 2008. It is unclear if this will continue for future trials. Unlike all other US Swimming meets, United States citizenship is required to compete at this meet since only United States citizens are allowed to represent the United States at the Olympics. The Olympic Trials are also under unique requirements made by the USOC.

Olympic Team members determined at the US Olympic Trials attend training camps at various locations across the United States, such as the 2016 US Olympic Training Camp at Northside Swim Center in San Antonio, Texas.

In 2021, USA Swimming debuted a two wave structure for the 2020 US Olympic Trials in response to social distancing requirements due to the COVID-19 pandemic. The event was broken into two meets, called Wave I and Wave II, which were held at different dates at the same venue in June 2021. Selected qualifiers from Wave I advanced to Wave II. The 2020 US Olympic swim team was selected from Wave II participants.

=== International Team Trials (non-Olympics) ===
Trials meets are also held for the World Championships, Pan American Games and World University Games, typically at a national championship meet. The 2022 International Team Trials is one such meet, from which teams for the 2022 World Aquatics Championships and the 2022 Junior Pan Pacific Swimming Championships were selected, that is to be held as a stand-alone meet, separate from the year's National Championships.

== National age group records ==
USA Swimming maintains a list of current records for American swimmers ages 18 years old and younger called National Age Group (NAG) records. The records are the fastest swims by an American swimmer for the specified age group, gender, and event. NAG records are maintained for short course yards and long course meters. For both distances the age group breakdown for individual events is the same for boys and girls: 10 & under, 11–12, 13–14, 15–16, and 17–18 year olds. NAG records for relays cover one age group, 15–18 year olds, and include girls, boys, and mixed relay records.

== Online resources ==
=== YouTube channel ===
USA Swimming started a YouTube channel on September 21, 2009, where it publishes a variety of swimming-centric videos covering topics such as races, athlete reactions, and training pointers. Occasionally it features athletes providing a glimpse into their daily training and nutrition routines, such as during the COVID-19 pandemic. It also produces a series entitled "Off the Blocks", which features various high-profile swimmers and coaches opening up about different aspects of their training and racing.

== Awards ==
=== Golden Goggle Awards ===
Each year USA Swimming honors United States swimmers and coaches and their accomplishments for the year through a handful of awards called the Golden Goggle Awards, colloquially known as the Golden Goggles, which span categories such as male or female swimmer of the year, coach of the year, and relay performance of the year. USA Swimming commenced holding an annual awards ceremony to give the recipients their awards in November 2004 in New York City. The Golden Goggle Awards have received recognition on the international level, by organizations such as Reuters, World Aquatics, and the International Olympic Committee (via Olympics.com), at the national level, including by NBC Sports and Sports Illustrated, and at the local level in print newspapers such as The Seattle Times and Kitsap Sun.

=== Pettigrew and Athlete of the Year awards ===
In addition to the Golden Goggle Awards, USA Swimming awards an annual Pettigrew Award, an award made in honor of Kenneth J. Pettigrew and awarded to various positions including officials and referees, and an annual Athlete of the Year award, an award "given to the individual with the most outstanding year of swimming performances", which were both handed out at the annual business meeting starting in 2021. Prior to 2021, the awards were handed out at various organizational events including the United States Aquatic Sports Convention.

=== Coach of the Year award ===
The coach of the year award began in 1996 with its first winner being Murray Stephens from the North Baltimore Aquatic Club. There are also awards for the developmental coach of the year and the ASCA (American Swim Coach Association) award. Eddie Reese of the University of Texas at Austin currently holds the most coach of the year awards at 19. The Coach of the year award is an award given out based on nominations from the community.

== Controversy ==
As with several other U.S. sports governing bodies, USA Swimming has dealt with accusations of sexual abuse, resulting in several lawsuits and prompting changes in U.S. federal law.

Several high-profile coaches were banned for life a couple of decades after their alleged abuses took place. In 2012, USA Swimming banned Rick Curl, and the Curl-Burke Swim Club was rebranded the Nation's Capital Swim Club, which at the time served 2,000 swimmers in the D.C. metro area. In 2013, former Olympic team coach Mitch Ivey was banned as the result of allegations dating back to the 1970s.

In 2018, an investigation by the Orange County Register found hundreds of swimmers whose claims of sexual abuse had allegedly been mishandled or ignored by USA Swimming. In 2020, six swimmers sued USA Swimming, accusing former executive director Chuck Wielgus and other officials at the national, state and club level of failing to address behavior by Ivey, former U.S. national team director Everett Uchiyama and former coach Andy King, the latter of whom was serving 40 years in prison after pleading no contest to 20 child molestation charges. American activists also blocked Wielgus from being inducted into the International Swimming Hall of Fame in 2014. Wielgus died in 2017.

On February 19, 2025, USA Swimming named Christine Rawak as its new CEO and president. Nine days later, USA Swimming's board of governors announced that Rawak would not assume the role, stating that it had just learned of a complaint against her regarding her conduct while coaching at the University of Michigan that had been filed with the U.S. Center for SafeSport, an organization that handles abuse and misconduct claims, that Rawak had not disclosed. When they raised the issue with Rawak, USA Swimming said Rawak informed it that she intended to resign.

== See also ==
- United States Aquatic Sports
- World Aquatics (formerly FINA [Fédération Internationale de Natation])
- Swimming pool#Competition pools
- Swimming (sport)#Swimwear
- U.S. Masters Swimming
