= Kong Yaqi =

Chinese swimmer (born 2008)

Personal information
- Native name: 孔雅琪
- Born: January 24, 2008 (age 18) Ningbo, Zhejiang, China

Sport
- Sport: Swimming
Medal record
Women's swimming
Representing China
Olympic Games
Bronze medal – third place	2024 Paris	4×200 m freestyle

Kong Yaqi (Chinese: 孔雅琪; born 24 January 2008) is a Chinese swimmer. She competed at the 2024 Summer Olympics and won a bronze medal in the 4 x 200 m freestyle relay.

== Biography ==
Kong Yaqi was born on 24 January 2008. She grew up in Ningbo, Zhejiang, China. She started swimming at age four and then trained regularly in the following years, winning many area youth championships. She attended Shaocheng Primary School and then Meishan School for junior high school. At the provincial championships in November 2022, Kong was the gold medalist in the women's 100m freestyle and 200m freestyle, competing in the 14-16 age bracket.

She won a silver medal in the 4×200m freestyle relay at the 2023 National Swimming Championships, and later that year won both bronze as an individual at the National Student Games in the 100 metres freestyle and gold as part of the Ningbo 4×200m freestyle relay team. At the 2024 National Spring Swimming Championships, held in March 2024, she won gold in the 200m freestyle and silver in the 100m freestyle and 400m freestyle. The following month, she competed at the National Swimming Championships and placed fifth in the 200m freestyle, also winning silver in the 4×200m freestyle relay.

Kong was selected to compete at the 2024 Summer Olympics in the 4×200m freestyle relay event. At age 16, she was the youngest 2024 Olympic swimmer from her province. She competed in the preliminary round of the Olympics and helped the Chinese relay team win the bronze medal.
