= 2024 NCAA Division I Women's Swimming and Diving Championships =

American college aquatic sports competition

- Host city: (Georgia (U.S. state)) Athens, Georgia
- Date: March 20–23, 2024
- Venue(s): Gabrielsen Natatorium; University of Georgia

The 2024 NCAA Division I Women's Swimming and Diving Championships took place March 20–23, 2024 at the 42nd annual NCAA-sanctioned swim meet to determine the team and individual national champions of Division I women's collegiate swimming and diving in the United States.

The meet was hosted by the University of Georgia at the Gabrielsen Natatorium in Athens, Georgia.

The University of Virginia won for the fourth consecutive year. The Cavaliers are the third program ever to win four years in a row.

== Team standings ==
- Note: Top 10 only
- (H) = Hosts
- ^{(DC)} = Defending champions

Rank	Team	Points
1st place, gold medalist(s)	Virginia ^{(DC)}	527.5
2nd place, silver medalist(s)	Texas	441
3rd place, bronze medalist(s)	Florida	364
4	Tennessee	277
5	Stanford	250
6	Louisville	212
7	Indiana	206
8	Southern California	200
9	Ohio State	162
9	NC State	162

== Swimming results ==
Full results:

Event	Gold		Silver		Bronze	
50 freestyle	Gretchen Walsh; Virginia	20.37; US, AR	Katharine Berkoff; NC State	21.09	Jasmine Nocentini; Virginia	21.10
100 freestyle	Gretchen Walsh; Virginia	44.83; US, AR	Katharine Berkoff; NC State	46.23	Isabel Ivey; Florida	46.67
200 freestyle	Bella Sims; Florida	1:40.90	Anna Peplowski; Indiana	1:40.97	Minna Abraham; Southern California	1:41.96
500 freestyle	Bella Sims; Florida	4:32.47	Emma Weyant; Florida	4:33.70	Anna Peplowski; Indiana	4:34.06
1650 freestyle	Abby McCulloh; Georgia	15:37.74	Aurora Roghair; Stanford	15:41.11	Ching Hwee Gan; Indiana	15:46.90
100 backstroke	Katharine Berkoff; NC State	48.55	Isabelle Stadden; California	50.47	Kennedy Noble; NC State	50.54
200 backstroke	Phoebe Bacon; Wisconsin	1:48.23	Kennedy Noble; NC State	1:48.43	Bella Sims; Florida	1:48.47
100 breaststroke	Jasmine Nocentini; Virginia	56.09	Mona McSharry; Tennessee	56.64	Kaitlyn Dobler; Southern California	56.67
200 breaststroke	Alex Walsh; Virginia	2:02.07	Mona McSharry; Tennessee	2:04.07	Ella Nelson; Virginia	2:04.80
100 butterfly	Gretchen Walsh; Virginia	47.42; US, AR	Emma Sticklen; Texas	49.70	Olivia Bray; Texas	50.52
200 butterfly	Emma Sticklen; Texas	1:50.99	Kelly Pash; Texas	1:51.57	Rachel Klinker; California	1:51.62
200 IM	Alex Walsh; Virginia	1:49.20	Isabel Ivey; Florida	1:51.96	Josephine Fuller; Tennessee	1:52.04
400 IM	Alex Walsh; Virginia	3:55.97	Emma Weyant; Florida	3:59.00	Lucy Bell; Stanford	4:01.23
200 freestyle relay	Virginia; Jasmine Nocentini (21.26); Gretchen Walsh (20.23); Alex Walsh (21.23); Maxine Parker (21.33)	1:24.05; MR	Louisville; Gabi Albiero (21.77); Christiana Regenauer (21.11); Julia Dennis (21.17); Ella Welch (21.42)	1:25.47	Texas; Grace Cooper (21.92); Ava Longi (21.31); Emma Sticklen (21.35); Kelly Pash (21.59)	1:26.17
400 freestyle relay	Virginia; Jasmine Nocentini (47.06); Alex Walsh (46.54); Gretchen Walsh (45.17); Maxine Parker (47.12)	3:05.89	Florida; Bella Sims (47.01); Isabel Ivey (46.26); Lainy Kruger (48.45); Micayla Cronk (46.88)	3:08.60	Louisville; Christiana Regenauer (47.51); Gabi Albiero (47.16); Julia Dennis (47.24); Lucy Mehraban (47.17)	3:09.08
800 freestyle relay	Florida; Bella Sims (1:41.03); Isabel Ivey (1:41.64); Emma Weyant (1:42.90); Micayla Cronk (1:43.02)	6:48.59	Tennessee; Brooklyn Douthwright (1:42.45); Camille Spink (1:42.08); Julia Mrozinski (1:43.81); Josephine Fuller (1:42.48)	6:50.82	Stanford; Aurora Roghair (1:42.82); Lillie Nordmann (1:42.32); Natalie Mannion (1:43.75); Kayla Wilson (1:42.28)	6:51.17
200 medley relay	Virginia; Gretchen Walsh (22.10); Jasmine Nocentini (25.72); Carly Novelline (22.38); Maxine Parker (21.38)	1:31.58	Ohio State; Nyah Funderburke (23.44); Hannah Bach (25.68); Katherine Zenick (22.33); Teresa Ivan (21.64)	1:33.09	Florida; Aris Runnels (23.82); Molly Mayne (26.71); Olivia Peoples (22.42); Micayla Cronk (21.35)	1:34.30
400 medley relay	Virginia; Gretchen Walsh (48.26); Jasmine Nocentini (56.34); Alex Walsh (49.15); Maxine Parker (47.26)	3:21.01; US	Texas; Berit Berglund (51.51); Anna Elendt (56.98); Emma Sticklen (49.67); Kelly Pash (46.76)	3:24.92	Tennessee; Josephine Fuller (50.22); Mona McSharry (56.80); Sara Stotler (51.95); Camille Spink (46.42)	3:25.39

Legend: US – U.S. Open record; MR – Meet record; AR – American record;

== Diving results ==
Event	Gold		Silver		Bronze	
1 m diving	Aranza Vázquez; North Carolina	350.50	Hailey Hernandez; Texas	326.20	Nike Agunbiade; Southern California	319.50
3 m diving	Aranza Vázquez; North Carolina	350.50	Anne Fowler; Indiana	342.45	Hailey Hernandez; Texas	342.15
Platform diving	Viviana Del Angel; Minnesota	327.90	Montserrat Lavenant; LSU	304.70	Jordan Skilken; Texas	293.60

== See also ==
- List of college swimming and diving teams
