= 2023 USA Swimming Championships =

American swimming tournament

The 2023 Phillips 66 National Swimming Championships was held on June 27 to July 1, 2023, at the IU Natatorium in Indianapolis, Indiana. The competition serves as the selection meet for determining the swim team to represent the United States at the 2023 World Aquatics Championships in Fukuoka, Japan.

== Overall results ==
Key: Highlighted swimmers fulfilled the qualification criteria and were named to the team roster for the 2023 World Aquatics Championships in the event.

=== Men ===
Event	Gold		Silver		Bronze	
50 m freestyle	Ryan Held	21.50	Jack Alexy	21.63	Michael Andrew	21.64
100 m freestyle	Jack Alexy	47.93	Chris Guiliano	47.98	Matt King	47.99
200 m freestyle	Luke Hobson	1:45.18	Kieran Smith	1:45.63	Drew Kibler	1:45.75
400 m freestyle	David Johnston	3:45.75	Kieran Smith	3:46.11	Jake Mitchell	3:46.87
800 m freestyle	Bobby Finke	7:40.34 CR	Ross Dant	7:48.10	Will Gallant	7:50.75
1500 m freestyle	Bobby Finke	14:42.81 CR	Charlie Clark	14:50.84	Will Gallant	15:02.63
50 m backstroke	Justin Ress	24.10 CR	Hunter Armstrong	24.16	Wyatt Davis	24.62
100 m backstroke	Hunter Armstrong	52.33	Ryan Murphy	52.39	Justin Ress	52.90
200 m backstroke	Ryan Murphy	1:55.03	Destin Lasco	1:55.63	Jack Aikins; Daniel Diehl	1:56.04
50 m breaststroke	Nic Fink	26.74 CR	Michael Andrew	26.87	Noah Nichols	27.30
100 m breaststroke	Nic Fink	58.36	Josh Matheny	59.20	Noah Nichols	59.40
200 m breaststroke	Matt Fallon	2:07.71	Josh Matheny	2:08.32	Jake Foster	2:09.10
50 m butterfly	Michael Andrew	23.11	Dare Rose	23.20	Caeleb Dressel	23.35
100 m butterfly	Dare Rose	50.74	Thomas Heilman	51.19	Shaine Casas	51.42
200 m butterfly	Carson Foster	1:54.32	Thomas Heilman	1:54.54	Zach Harting	1:55.12
200 m IM	Carson Foster	1:56.19	Shaine Casas	1:57.47	Trenton Julian	1:57.94
400 m IM	Carson Foster	4:08.14	Chase Kalisz	4:08.22	Bobby Finke	4:09.55

=== Women ===
Event	Gold		Silver		Bronze	
50 m freestyle	Abbey Weitzeil	24.00 CR	Gretchen Walsh	24.31	Kate Douglass; Olivia Smoliga	24.48
100 m freestyle	Kate Douglass	52.57	Abbey Weitzeil	53.11	Gretchen Walsh	53.14
200 m freestyle	Claire Weinstein	1:55.26	Katie Ledecky	1:55.28	Bella Sims	1:56.08
400 m freestyle	Katie Ledecky	4:00.45	Bella Sims	4:03.25	Leah Smith	4:03.85
800 m freestyle	Katie Ledecky	8:07.07 CR	Jillian Cox	8:20.28	Claire Weinstein	8:21.00
1500 m freestyle	Katie Ledecky	15:29.64 CR	Katie Grimes	15:58.34	Kensey McMahon	16:07.78
50 m backstroke	Katharine Berkoff	27.13 CR	Regan Smith	27.14	Gretchen Walsh	27.54
100 m backstroke	Regan Smith	57.71 CR	Katharine Berkoff	58.01	Claire Curzan	58.59
200 m backstroke	Regan Smith	2:03.80 CR	Rhyan White	2:05.77	Claire Curzan	2:06.35
50 m breaststroke	Lilly King	29.77	Lydia Jacoby	29.81	Kaitlyn Dobler	30.36
100 m breaststroke	Lilly King	1:04.75	Lydia Jacoby	1:05.16	Kaitlyn Dobler	1:05.48
200 m breaststroke	Lilly King	2:20.95	Kate Douglass	2:21.22	Annie Lazor	2:25.86
50 m butterfly	Gretchen Walsh	25.11 AR	Torri Huske	25.33	Claire Curzan	25.46
100 m butterfly	Torri Huske	56.18	Gretchen Walsh	56.34	Kate Douglass	56.43
200 m butterfly	Regan Smith	2:05.79 CR	Lindsay Looney	2:07.35	Dakota Luther	2:07.86
200 m IM	Kate Douglass	2:07.09 CR	Alex Walsh	2:07.89	Torri Huske	2:09.75
400 m IM	Katie Grimes	4:33.80	Alex Walsh	4:35.46	Leah Hayes	4:38.45

== Results for World Championships freestyle relay events ==
The following swimmers fulfilled the qualification criteria and were named to the team roster for the 2023 World Aquatics Championships in the event.

=== Men ===
Place →	1st	2nd	3rd	4th	5th	6th
4×100 m freestyle	Jack Alexy; 47.93	Chris Guiliano; 47.98	Matt King; 47.99	Destin Lasco; 48.00	Ryan Held; 48.08	Justin Ress; 48.18
4×200 m freestyle	Luke Hobson; 1:45.18	Kieran Smith; 1:45.63	Drew Kibler; 1:45.75	Jake Mitchell; 1:46.25	Baylor Nelson; 1:46.51	Henry McFadden; 1:47.02

=== Women ===
Place →	1st	2nd	3rd	4th	5th	6th
4×100 m freestyle	Kate Douglass; 52.57	Abbey Weitzeil; 53.11	Gretchen Walsh; 53.14	Olivia Smoliga; 53.28	Torri Huske; 53.41	Maxine Parker; 53.51
4×200 m freestyle	Claire Weinstein; 1:55.26	Katie Ledecky; 1:55.28	Bella Sims; 1:56.08	Erin Gemmell; 1:56.23	Alex Shackell; 1:56.70	Leah Smith; 1:56.91

== International team qualifiers ==
=== 2023 World Aquatics Championships team ===
The roster for the US 2023 World Aquatics Championships were announced on the last day of the meet. 22 women and 26 men were announced to the team in pool events at Worlds. Notably, Michael Andrew was not named to the team despite winning the 50 fly due to the qualifying criteria, which limits the number of swimmers on a team to 26 men and women.

==== Men ====
- Jack Alexy, Hunter Armstrong, Shaine Casas, Charlie Clark, Ross Dant, Matt Fallon, Nic Fink, Bobby Finke, Carson Foster, Brennan Gravley, Chris Guiliano, Ryan Held, Thomas Heilman, Luke Hobson, David Johnston, Chase Kalisz, Drew Kibler, Matt King, Destin Lasco, Josh Matheny, Henry McFadden, Jake Mitchell, Ryan Murphy, Baylor Nelson, Justin Ress, Dare Rose, Kieran Smith, Joey Tepper

==== Women ====
- Katharine Berkoff, Jillian Cox, Mariah Denigan, Kate Douglass, Erin Gemmell, Katie Grimes, Torri Huske, Lydia Jacoby, Lilly King, Katie Ledecky, Lindsay Looney, Maxine Parker, Anna Peplowski, Alex Shackell, Bella Sims, Regan Smith, Olivia Smoliga, Leah Smith, Rhyan White, Alex Walsh, Gretchen Walsh, Claire Weinstein, Abbey Weitzeil

== See also ==
- United States at the 2023 World Aquatics Championships
- Swimming at the 2023 World Aquatics Championships
- List of swimming competitions
