= Kensey McMahon =

American swimmer (born 1999)

Personal information
- Full name: Kensey Paige McMahon
- Nationality: American
- Born: October 29, 1999 (age 26) Jacksonville, Florida, U.S.
- Height: 5 ft 8 in (173 cm)

Sport
- Sport: Swimming
- Strokes: Freestyle
- College team: University of Alabama
Medal record
Women's swimming
Representing the United States
World Championships (SC)
Bronze medal – third place	2022 Melbourne	1500 m freestyle

Kensey Paige McMahon (born October 29, 1999) is an American competitive swimmer who specializes in distance events.

On June 4, 2024, it was reported that McMahon tested positive for vadadustat during an in-competition test at the 2023 U.S. National Championships. A hearing held on May 2, 2024 concluded that McMahon could not meet the burden of proof for a reduced sentence, and thus, would be suspended for four years. In a statement on Instagram, McMahon pledged that "God is worth the wait."

== Career ==
McMahon was born in Jacksonville, Florida. She attended Mandarin High School and the University of Alabama.

=== 2019 ===
McMahon competed at the 2019 NCAA Division I Championships in March and finished seventh in the 1650 y freestyle.

In July and August, McMahon competed at the 2019 U.S. National Championships. She won the silver medal in the 1500 m freestyle and finished fourth in the 800 m freestyle.

=== 2021 ===
McMahon competed at the 2021 NCAA Division I Championships in March and finished sixth in the 1650 y freestyle.

In June, McMahon competed at the 2020 U.S. Olympic trials, where she finished eighth in the 1500 m freestyle.

=== 2022 ===
McMahon competed at the 2022 NCAA Division I Championships in March. She won the bronze medal in the 1650 y freestyle and finished seventh in the 500 y freestyle.

In June, McMahon competed at the 2022 World Championships, where she finished 10th in the 25 km.

In July, McMahon competed at the 2022 U.S. National Championships. She won bronze medals in the 400 m freestyle, 800 m freestyle, and 1500 m freestyle.

In December, McMahon competed at the 2022 World Championships (25 m), where she won the bronze medal in the 1500 m freestyle.

=== 2023 ===
McMahon competed at the 2023 NCAA Division I Championships in March. She won gold medals in the 500 y freestyle and 1650 y freestyle.

In June and July, McMahon competed at the 2023 U.S. National Championships. She won the bronze medal in the 1500 m freestyle and finished sixth in the 800 m freestyle.

In 2024 McMahon was suspended for four years for doping.
