= Kate Douglass =

American swimmer (born 2001)

Personal information
- Full name: Katherine Cadwallader Douglass
- Born: November 17, 2001 (age 25) Pelham, New York, U.S.
- Height: 5 ft 10 in (178 cm)
- Weight: 125 lb (57 kg)

Sport
- Country: United States
- Sport: Swimming
- Strokes: Medley, breaststroke, freestyle, butterfly
- Club: New York Athletic Club (2023–present); University of Virginia (2019–2023); Chelsea Piers Aquatic Club (2017–2019); Westchester Aquatic Club (2010–2017)
- College team: University of Virginia
- Coach: Todd DeSorbo
Medal record
Women's swimming
Representing the United States
| Event | 1st | 2nd | 3rd |
|---|---|---|---|
| Olympic Games | 2 | 2 | 1 |
| World Championships (LC) | 7 | 7 | 5 |
| World Championships (SC) | 11 | 6 | 2 |
| Pan Pacific Championships | 4 | 2 | 0 |
| World Junior Championships | 0 | 1 | 0 |
| Total | 24 | 18 | 8 |
Olympic Games
| Gold medal – first place | 2024 Paris | 200 m breaststroke |
| Gold medal – first place | 2024 Paris | 4×100 m medley |
| Silver medal – second place | 2024 Paris | 200 m medley |
| Silver medal – second place | 2024 Paris | 4×100 m freestyle |
| Bronze medal – third place | 2020 Tokyo | 200 m medley |
World Championships (LC)
| Gold medal – first place | 2023 Fukuoka | 200 m medley |
| Gold medal – first place | 2023 Fukuoka | 4×100 m medley |
| Gold medal – first place | 2024 Doha | 200 m medley |
| Gold medal – first place | 2024 Doha | 4×100 m mixed medley |
| Gold medal – first place | 2025 Singapore | 200 m breaststroke |
| Gold medal – first place | 2025 Singapore | 4x100 m mixed freestyle |
| Gold medal – first place | 2025 Singapore | 4×100 m medley |
| Silver medal – second place | 2023 Fukuoka | 200 m breaststroke |
| Silver medal – second place | 2023 Fukuoka | 4×100 m freestyle |
| Silver medal – second place | 2023 Fukuoka | 4×100 m mixed freestyle |
| Silver medal – second place | 2024 Doha | 50 m freestyle |
| Silver medal – second place | 2024 Doha | 200 m breaststroke |
| Silver medal – second place | 2025 Singapore | 100 m breaststroke |
| Silver medal – second place | 2025 Singapore | 4×100 m freestyle |
| Bronze medal – third place | 2022 Budapest | 200 m breaststroke |
| Bronze medal – third place | 2022 Budapest | 4×100 m freestyle |
| Bronze medal – third place | 2022 Budapest | 4×100 m mixed freestyle |
| Bronze medal – third place | 2023 Fukuoka | 4×100 m mixed medley |
| Bronze medal – third place | 2024 Doha | 4×100 m mixed freestyle |
World Championships (SC)
| Gold medal – first place | 2021 Abu Dhabi | 4×50 m freestyle |
| Gold medal – first place | 2021 Abu Dhabi | 4×100 m freestyle |
| Gold medal – first place | 2022 Melbourne | 200 m breaststroke |
| Gold medal – first place | 2022 Melbourne | 200 m medley |
| Gold medal – first place | 2022 Melbourne | 4×50 m freestyle |
| Gold medal – first place | 2022 Melbourne | 4×100 m medley |
| Gold medal – first place | 2022 Melbourne | 4×50 m mixed medley |
| Gold medal – first place | 2024 Budapest | 200 m breaststroke |
| Gold medal – first place | 2024 Budapest | 200 m medley |
| Gold medal – first place | 2024 Budapest | 4×100 m freestyle |
| Gold medal – first place | 2024 Budapest | 4×100 m medley |
| Silver medal – second place | 2021 Abu Dhabi | 4×50 m medley |
| Silver medal – second place | 2021 Abu Dhabi | 4×50 m mixed medley |
| Silver medal – second place | 2022 Melbourne | 4×100 m freestyle |
| Silver medal – second place | 2022 Melbourne | 4×50 m medley |
| Silver medal – second place | 2024 Budapest | 50 m freestyle |
| Silver medal – second place | 2024 Budapest | 100 m medley |
| Bronze medal – third place | 2021 Abu Dhabi | 200 m medley |
| Bronze medal – third place | 2024 Budapest | 100 m freestyle |
Pan Pacific Championships
| Gold medal – first place | 2026 Irvine | 50 m freestyle |
| Gold medal – first place | 2026 Irvine | 4×100 m freestyle |
| Gold medal – first place | 2026 Irvine | 4×100 m medley |
| Gold medal – first place | 2026 Irvine | 4×100 m mixed medley |
| Silver medal – second place | 2026 Irvine | 50 m butterfly |
| Silver medal – second place | 2026 Irvine | 200 m breaststroke |
World Junior Championships
| Silver medal – second place | 2017 Indianapolis | 4×100 m freestyle |

Katherine Cadwallader Douglass (born November 17, 2001) is an American competitive swimmer. She is a five-time Olympic medalist who has won two gold medals, as well as 34 World Championships medals, 16 of which are gold. She is the current world record holder for the short-course 100 m freestyle, 200 m breaststroke, and 200 m individual medley, as well as the long-course 50 m freestyle.

Douglass competed for the University of Virginia during her NCAA career, which lasted from 2019 to 2023. She helped Virginia win three NCAA Division I Championships in 2021, 2022, and 2023. As an individual, she won 15 gold and 6 silver medals at the NCAA championships. She also won the Honda Sports Award as the best college female swimmer in 2022 and 2023.

== Early life ==
Douglass was born in Pelham, New York, on November 17, 2001, to Allison and William Douglass. She has a younger sister, Abby, and a younger brother, Will. She attended Pelham Memorial High School and graduated in 2019. From age 7 to 15, Douglass swam for the Westchester Aquatic Club in Westchester County, New York. She swam with the Chelsea Piers Aquatic Club in Stamford, Connecticut in for her last two years of high school, starting in 2017.

== Career ==
=== 2016 ===
Douglass qualified for the 2016 U.S. Olympic Trials and competed in the 50 meter freestyle, 100 meter breaststroke, 200 meter breaststroke, and 200 meter individual medley, placing 32nd, 48th, 77th, and 81st. She did not make the 2016 Olympic team. Douglass burst into the swimming spotlight as a high school sophomore in November 2016, when she broke Dara Torres' 34-year old 13–14 national age group record of 22.44 in the 50 yard freestyle, swimming a time of 22.32 at a high school state meet. A month later, at the 2016 U.S. Winter Junior Championships, Douglass tied Simone Manuel's 15–16 national age group record in the 50 yard freestyle with a time of 22.04.

=== 2017 ===
2017 World Junior Championships
| Silver medal – second place | 4×100 m freestyle | 3:39.69 |

At the 2017 World Junior Championships as a member of the U.S. junior national team, Douglass finished eleventh in the semifinals of the 50 m freestyle, and did not qualify for the finals. She also swam in the preliminary heats of the 4×100 meter freestyle relay, which earned her a silver medal.

=== 2018 ===
In her junior year of high school, Douglass verbally committed to swim for the University of Virginia's class of 2023. Due to her national age group records in the 50 yard freestyle and her top-ranked times in the breaststroke and individual medley events, she was named SwimSwam's #2 girls' recruit in their class of 2019 rankings. At the 2018 Youth Olympic Games, Douglass placed seventh overall in the finals of the 50 m freestyle. She did not qualify for the finals in her other individual events.

=== 2019 ===
Douglass competed at the 2019 U.S. National Championships in July and August. She did not win a medal in any of her events.

=== 2020 ===
==== 2020 NCAA season ====
Although Douglass had a national age group record heading into college, she broke through as an elite swimmer in her freshman year at Virginia with coach Todd DeSorbo. At a dual meet in October 2019, Douglass swam a 22.28 second 50 yard freestyle and a 2:07.92 200 yard breaststroke, becoming only the third female swimmer to 22-point the 50 free and 2:07 in the 200 breast. She improved her time in the 200 breaststroke to 2:06.19 in January 2020. In November 2019, Douglass broke the ACC record in the 200 yard individual medley with a time of 1:52.84.

At the 2020 ACC Championships, Douglass won the 200 yard individual medley title in a time of 1:51.36, making her the fastest freshman ever in the event and the fourth-fastest in history. Her swim also re-broke her existing conference record. She won a conference title in the 100 yard butterfly with a time of 50.83 and placed third in the 200 yard breaststroke with a personal best time of 2:05.89 to help Virginia win their 16th ACC championship. Headed into the 2020 NCAA Championships, Douglass was the top seed in the 200 yard individual medley, the third seed in the 200 yard breaststroke, and the fourth seed in the 100 yard butterfly, but the meet was canceled due to the COVID-19 pandemic.

=== 2021 ===
==== 2021 NCAA season ====
At the Tennessee Invitational in November 2020, Douglass swam a 200 yard individual medley in a time of 1:50.82 to become the third-fastest swimmer all-time in the event. Her time was three-tenths off of Ella Eastin's NCAA record of 1:50.62. She split a 21.96 while swimming the 50 yard butterfly on Virginia's 200 medley relay, then the fastest 50 butterfly time in history. Douglass swam a 47.77 100 yard freestyle and a 50.18 100 yard butterfly, both best times for her. During a time trial swim in February 2021, Douglass swam a 2:03.92 200 yard breaststroke, moving her up the rankings as the ninth-fastest performer of all time in the event.

Douglass started off 2021 ACC Championships by breaking the NCAA record in the 200 medley relay with her teammates Caroline Gemlich, Alexis Wenger, and Lexi Cuomo. She swam the freestyle leg of the relay. The next day, she was upset by teammate Alex Walsh in the 200 yard individual medley. Despite being the favorite in the event coming into the race, Douglass swam a second slower than her best time with a time of 1:51.97 to finish second. Douglass took home two ACC titles in 2021, winning the 100 yard freestyle with a time of 46.83 and the 100 yard butterfly with a time of 49.96.

==== 2021 NCAA Championships ====
2021 NCAA Championships
| Gold medal – first place | 50 yd freestyle | 21.13 |
| Silver medal – second place | 100 yd freestyle | 46.30 |
| Silver medal – second place | 100 yd butterfly | 49.55 |
| Silver medal – second place | 4×50 yd freestyle | 1:25.97 |
| Silver medal – second place | 4×100 yd freestyle | 3:10.45 |
| Silver medal – second place | 4×50 yd medley | 1:34.13 |
| Silver medal – second place | 4×100 yd medley | 3:25.13 |

Going into the 2021 NCAA Championships, Douglass was the top ranked swimmer in the 50 yard freestyle, 100 yard freestyle, 200 yard individual medley, and 200 yard breaststroke. However, she opted for the sprint races, choosing to swim the 50 yard freestyle, 100 yard freestyle, and 100 yard butterfly at the meet. Douglass won her first NCAA title when she beat Michigan's Maggie Mac Neil by four-hundredths of a second in the 50 yard freestyle with a time of 21.13. She finished second to Mac Neil in both the 100 yard freestyle and 100 yard butterfly, swimming times of 46.30 and 49.55 respectively, and was a part of four Virginia second-place relays: the 200 yard medley relay, the 200 yard freestyle relay, the 400 yard freestyle relay, and the 400 yard medley relay. Douglass helped Virginia win their first-ever team national championship.

==== 2020 U.S. Olympic Trials ====
At the 2020 U.S. Olympic Trials that were held in June 2021, Douglass swam in the 50 meter freestyle, 100 meter freestyle, 100 meter butterfly, and 200 meter individual medley. With a time of 56.56 in the 100 meter butterfly, Douglass finished 0.13 seconds behind second-place Claire Curzan's 56.43. In the 200 meter individual medley, Douglass finished second to Alex Walsh and swam a personal best time of 2:09.32, qualifying her for her first Olympic Games. Additionally, Douglass finished seventh in the 50 meter freestyle and 100 meter freestyle, swimming times of 24.78 and 54.17.

==== 2020 Olympic Games ====
2020 Olympic Games
| Bronze medal – third place | 200 m individual medley | 2:09.04 |

At the 2020 Olympic Games, Douglass swam the top time in both the preliminary and semifinal rounds of the 200 m individual medley. Douglass won the bronze medal by beating Abbie Wood by 0.11 seconds, being behind after the first 150 meters of the race and passing her in the freestyle leg in a personal best time of 2:09.04. Japan's Yui Ohashi won gold, and Douglass' teammate Alex Walsh won silver.

==== 2021 Short Course World Championships ====
2021 Short Course World Championships
| Gold medal – first place | 4×50 m freestyle | 1:34.22 |
| Gold medal – first place | 4×100 m freestyle | 3:28.52 |
| Silver medal – second place | 4×50 m medley | 1:43.61 |
| Silver medal – second place | 4×50 m mixed medley | 1:37.04 |
| Bronze medal – third place | 200 m individual medley | 2:04.68 |

At the 2021 Short Course World Championships in Abu Dhabi, Douglass won two gold medals in the 4×50 m and 4×100 m women's relays, as well as a bronze medal in the 200 m individual medley. In addition, she was awarded two silver medals for having competed in the preliminary heats for the women's 4×50 m medley and the mixed 4×50 m medley.

=== 2022 ===
==== 2022 NCAA season ====
At the 2021 Tennessee Invite, Douglass broke Sophie Hansson's ACC record in the 200 yard breaststroke, swimming a time of 2:03.58 to become the fourth-fastest performer ever. She bettered the time to 2:03.14 at the 2022 Cavalier Invite in February to become the second-fastest performer of all-time in the event. Douglass opted to swim only sprint events at the 2022 ACC Championships, and she won titles in the 50 yard freestyle, 100 yard freestyle, and 100 yard butterfly. Her time of 21.00 in the 50 free was the second-fastest performance of all time, trailing Abbey Weitzeil's then-NCAA record time of 20.90 by just 0.1 seconds. In addition, she was a part of Virginia's 200 freestyle, 200 medley, and 400 medley relays that broke NCAA, U.S. Open, and American records. She scored 96 individual points to help Virginia win their third-straight ACC team championship.

==== 2022 NCAA Championships ====
2022 NCAA Championships
| Gold medal – first place | 50 yd freestyle | 20.84 (NR, CR) |
| Gold medal – first place | 100 yd butterfly | 49.04 (NR) |
| Gold medal – first place | 200 yd breaststroke | 2:02.19 (NR, CR) |
| Gold medal – first place | 4×50 yd freestyle | 1:24.96 |
| Gold medal – first place | 4×100 yd freestyle | 3:06.91 (NR, CR) |
| Gold medal – first place | 4×50 yd medley | 1:32.16 (CR) |
| Gold medal – first place | 4×100 yd medley | 3:22.34 (NR, CR) |

At the 2022 NCAA Championships in Atlanta, Douglass won seven titles, three individual events and four relays. She began the meet by breaking the NCAA, U.S. Open, and American record in the preliminary rounds of the 50 freestyle, swimming a 20.87. In the finals, she lowered that record time to a 20.84, successfully defending her national title. The next day, she upset defending Olympic and NCAA champion Maggie Mac Neil as well as long course American record holder Torri Huske to win the 100 butterfly, swimming 49.04 to break Claire Curzan's American record of 49.24. On the final day of the meet, Douglass won the 200 breaststroke by over two seconds, clocking a 2:02.19 to break Lilly King's NCAA, U.S. Open, and American record. She became the first Division I collegiate swimmer, male or female, to win three NCAA titles in three different strokes.

In addition to her individual efforts, Douglass was a part of Virginia's national championship winning 200 free, 200 medley, 400 free, and 400 medley relays, with the latter two relays having broken NCAA, U.S. Open, and American records. Virginia won their second-consecutive NCAA team title by over 100 points. Douglass was named Swimmer of the Meet by the College Swimming and Diving Coaches Association of America (CSCAA), and commentator Rowdy Gaines described her swims as "the greatest single-meet performance in NCAA history." The CSCAA and swimming news outlet SwimSwam both named Douglass the 2022 NCAA Female Swimmer of the Year. In May, she received the 2022 Honda Sports Award for Swimming and Diving, an award to honor the top female athlete in each Division I NCAA sport.

==== 2022 U.S. International Team Trials ====
At the 2022 U.S. International Team Trials in Greensboro, North Carolina, Douglass qualified for the 200 m breaststroke at the World Championships in Budapest. She came into the meet with a best time of 2:28.00, but brought her time down to a 2:21.43 to finish second behind Olympic silver medalist Lilly King. In addition, Douglass finished fifth in the 100 m freestyle, which qualified her for a spot on the women's 4×100 freestyle relay at Worlds.

==== 2022 World Championships ====
2022 World Championships
| Bronze medal – third place | 200 m breaststroke | 2:23.20 |
| Bronze medal – third place | 4×100 m freestyle | 3:32.58 |
| Bronze medal – third place | 4×100 m mixed freestyle | 3:21.09 |

In Budapest, Douglass won the bronze medal in the 200 m breaststroke as well as the bronze medal in the women's 4×100 m freestyle relay. For the 4×100 m freestyle mixed relay, she was also awarded a bronze medal for competing in the heats.

==== 2022 Short Course World Championships ====
2022 Short Course World Championships
| Gold medal – first place | 200 m breaststroke | 2:15.77 (CR) |
| Gold medal – first place | 200 m individual medley | 2:02.12 (AM) |
| Gold medal – first place | 4×50 m freestyle | 1:33.89 (AM, CR) |
| Gold medal – first place | 4×100 m medley | 3:44.35 (WR) |
| Gold medal – first place | 4×50 m mixed medley | 1:35.15 (WR) |
| Silver medal – second place | 4×100 m freestyle | 3:26.29 (AM) |
| Silver medal – second place | 4×50 m medley | 1:42.41 |

At the 2022 Short Course World Championships in Melbourne, Douglass won a gold medal in the 200 m individual medley, setting a new Americas record of 2:02.12 and swimming the second-fastest time ever behind Katinka Hosszú in 2014 (2:01.86). This was her first individual title in a global competition. Douglass won a silver medal with the women's 4×100 meter freestyle relay in 3:26.29, setting another Americas record, and a gold medal with the 4×50 meter mixed medley relay, setting a new world record. She won a gold medal with the women's 4×50 meter freestyle relay with another Americas and championship record. She won a gold medal in the 4×100 meter medley relay, setting a new world record, and another silver medal in the women's 4×50 m medley relay. She also won the gold medal in the 200 meter breaststroke, setting a new championship record and winning her second individual title in a global competition within three days.

=== 2023 ===
==== 2023 NCAA season ====
At the 2022 Tennessee Invite, Douglass broke her own NCAA, U.S. Open, and American record in the 200 yard breaststroke, swimming a time of 2:01.87. At the 2023 Cavalier Invitational, Douglass further reset the U.S. Open and American record in the 200 yard breaststroke with a time of 2:01.43, becoming the fastest ever in the event by over a second. However, as this swim was done as a time trial, it was not eligible as an NCAA record. At the 2023 ACC Championships, Douglass swam the 100 yard butterfly, 200 yard individual medley, and 100 yard freestyle, winning titles in all three events. She recorded a time of 48.84 in the 100 yard butterfly, setting NCAA, U.S. Open, and American records, as well as swimming a time of 45.86 in the 100 yard freestyle which made her the third woman under 46 seconds in the event, and a time of 1:50.15 in the 200 yard IM, placing her at second fastest of all time and just 0.07 seconds off Alex Walsh's record.

==== 2023 NCAA Championships ====
2023 NCAA Championships
| Gold medal – first place | 100 yd butterfly | 48.46 (NR, CR) |
| Gold medal – first place | 200 yd breaststroke | 2:01.29 (NR, CR) |
| Gold medal – first place | 200 yd individual medley | 1:48.37 (NR, CR) |
| Gold medal – first place | 4×50 yd freestyle | 1:24.51 (CR) |
| Gold medal – first place | 4×100 yd freestyle | 3:05.84 (NR, CR) |
| Gold medal – first place | 4×50 yd medley | 1:31.51 (NR, CR) |
| Gold medal – first place | 4×100 yd medley | 3:22.39 |

At the 2023 NCAA Championships in Knoxville, Tennessee, Douglass won seven titles, three individual and four relays. On the first day of individual events, Douglass won the 200 yard individual medley in a time of 1:48.37, slashing 1.71 seconds off the previous American and U.S. Open records. She won the 100 yard butterfly the next day in another American and U.S. Open record time of 48.46, edging out Olympic champion Maggie Mac Neil by five-hundredths of a second. On the final day, Douglass completed a clean sweep of her three individual events with a victory in the 200 yard breaststroke, clocking a time of 2:01.29 which was another American and U.S. Open record. Douglass finished almost two seconds ahead of second place Anna Elendt.

Douglass was a part of four of the University of Virginia's championship winning relays, the 200 freestyle, 200 medley, 400 freestyle, and 400 medley relays. Two of the relays, the 200 medley and 400 freestyle, set new American and U.S. Open records. Virginia won their third consecutive NCAA team title, while Douglass was named the NCAA Championships Swimmer of the Meet by the CSCAA, and Sports Illustrated called her 2023 championships "one of the greatest NCAA swimming performances of all time."

For the second straight year, Douglass won the CSCAA NCAA Female Swimmer of the Year award and the Honda Sports Award for Swimming and Diving. During her time at Virginia, she competed in three NCAA Championships and won fifteen titles (seven individual and eight relays). Her NCAA career was rated as one of the greatest of all time by various sporting and swimming news outlets, including SwimSwam. In May, Douglass graduated from the University of Virginia with a bachelor's degree in statistics. Douglass enrolled in a master's degree in statistics at Virginia, researching data analytics in competitive swimming with Ken Ono.

==== 2023 U.S. National Championships ====
At the 2023 U.S. National Championships, Douglass won gold medals in the 100 m freestyle and 200 m individual medley, she won a silver medal in the 200 m breaststroke, and she won bronze medals in the 50 m freestyle and 100 m butterfly. She set personal bests in five events. At the end of the meet, she was named to the World Championship team.

==== 2023 World Championships ====
2023 World Championships
| Gold medal – first place | 200 m individual medley | 2:07.17 |
| Gold medal – first place | 4×100 m medley | 3:52.08 |
| Silver medal – second place | 200 m breaststroke | 2:21.23 |
| Silver medal – second place | 4×100 m freestyle | 3:31.93 |
| Silver medal – second place | 4×100 m mixed freestyle | 3:20.82 |
| Bronze medal – third place | 4×100 m mixed medley | 3:40.19 |

At the 2023 World Championships, Douglass competed in seven events and won six medals. She won the most medals of any American athlete during the competition. On July 23, she swam in the final of the women's 4 × 100 m freestyle relay, winning a silver medal. The next day, she won the gold medal in the 200 m individual medley in an American one-two finish with Alex Walsh. Douglass passed Walsh during the freestyle leg to win her first World Championship title.

On July 26, Douglass swam in the final of the mixed 4 × 100 m medley relay, winning a bronze medal. On July 28, she finished fourth in the 100 m freestyle. Later that night, she competed in the 200 m breaststroke and won the silver medal. On July 29, Douglass swam in the final of the mixed 4 × 100 m freestyle relay, winning a silver medal. The next day, she swam in the final of the women's 4 × 100 m medley relay, winning a gold medal. Later in 2023, Douglass swam the 100 yard individual medley in 51.97 seconds at an intrasquad meet at the University of Virginia, which made her the first woman to swim the event in under 52 seconds. At the Golden Goggle Awards in November, Douglass was named the Female Athlete of the Year, along with Katie Ledecky.

=== 2024 ===
==== 2024 World Championships ====
2024 World Championships
| Gold medal – first place | 200 m individual medley | 2:07.05 |
| Gold medal – first place | 4×100 m mixed medley | 3:40.22 |
| Silver medal – second place | 50 m freestye | 23.91 (AM) |
| Silver medal – second place | 200 m breaststroke | 2:20.91 |
| Bronze medal – third place | 4×100 m mixed freestyle | 3:22.28 |

At the 2024 World Championships, Douglass competed in six events and won five medals. On February 12, she defended her World Championship title in the 200 m individual medley with a personal best time of 2:07.05. On February 14, she swam in the final of the mixed 4 × 100 m medley relay, winning a gold medal. On February 16, she finished fourth in the 100 m freestyle. Later that night, she competed in the 200 m breaststroke and won the silver medal. The next day, Douglass swam in the final of the mixed 4 × 100 m freestyle relay, winning a bronze medal. On February 18, she won the silver medal in the 50 m freestyle with an American record time of 23.91.

==== 2024 U.S. Olympic Trials ====
At the 2024 U.S. Olympic Trials in June, Douglass competed in the 100 m freestyle, 200 m breaststroke, and 200 m individual medley. She won gold medals and qualified for the 2024 Olympic Games in all three events. Douglass broke the championship record in the 200 m breaststroke, and she broke the U.S. Open and championship records in the 200 m individual medley.

==== 2024 Olympic Games ====
2024 Olympic Games
| Gold medal – first place | 200 m breaststroke | 2:19.24 (AM) |
| Gold medal – first place | 4×100 m medley | 3:49.63 (WR) |
| Silver medal – second place | 200 m individual medley | 2:06.92 |
| Silver medal – second place | 4×100 m freestyle | 3:30.20 (AM) |

At the 2024 Olympic Games in July and August, Douglass competed in four events and won medals in all of them. She started off the meet by swimming in the heats and the final of the 4 × 100 m freestyle relay, helping the U.S. win the silver medal. She then won the gold medal in the 200 m breaststroke in an American record time. In the 200 m individual medley, Douglass won the silver medal. She also swam in the heats of the 4 × 100 m medley relay, and the U.S. finished first in the final, earning her a gold medal.

"Understated in temperament, underrated in toughness, impeccable in technique, Douglass was the hero America wanted and needed in the pool at these Paris Olympics. Her long-gliding breaststroke is so gorgeous that it looks effortless and might even feel that way at times ... but winning the 200-meter breaststroke Thursday was hardly soft stuff."

— Sports Illustrated, August 1, 2024

==== 2024 World Cup ====
Douglass competed in the 2024 World Cup circuit, consisting of three short course meets in October and November. She won 11 total events, sweeping all three in the 200 m breaststroke, 50 m butterfly, and 100 m individual medley, and one each in the 100 m freestyle and 200 m individual medley. In the process, Douglass twice broke the 200 m breaststroke short course world record. She finished first in the overall World Cup standings.

==== 2024 Short Course World Championships ====
2024 Short Course World Championships
| Gold medal – first place | 200 m breaststroke | 2:12.50 (WR) |
| Gold medal – first place | 200 m individual medley | 2:01.63 (WR) |
| Gold medal – first place | 4×100 m freestyle | 3:25.01 (WR) |
| Gold medal – first place | 4×100 m medley | 3:40.41 (WR) |
| Silver medal – second place | 50 m freestyle | 23.05 |
| Silver medal – second place | 100 m individual medley | 56.49 |
| Bronze medal – third place | 100 m freestyle | 50.73 |

At the 2024 Short Course World Championships in December, Douglass competed in seven events, winning four gold medals, two silver medals, and one bronze medal. She set personal bests in all five of her individual events. On December 10, Douglass won gold in the 200 m individual medley, defending her 2022 title and breaking the world record. Later that night, she swam in the final of the 4 × 100 m freestyle, helping the U.S. team win gold in a world record time. On December 12, Douglass competed in the 100 m freestyle and won bronze. On December 13, she won gold in the 200 m breaststroke, defending her 2022 title and breaking her own world record. Later that night, she won silver in the 100 m individual medley. On December 15, Douglass competed in the 50 m freestyle and won silver. Later that night, she swam the freestyle leg in the 4 × 100 m medley final, helping the U.S. win gold in a world record time.

=== 2025 ===
2025 World Championships
| Gold medal – first place | 200 m breaststroke | 2:18.50 (CR, AM) |
| Gold medal – first place | 4x100 m mixed freestyle | 3:18.48 (WR) |
| Gold medal – first place | 4x100 m medley | 3:49.34 (WR) |
| Silver medal – second place | 4×100 m freestyle | 3:31.04 |
| Silver medal – second place | 100 m breaststroke | 1:05.27 |

Douglass waived to compete in the 200 meter IM, the competition she won in the two previous World Championships, but won the silver medal with the US 4 x 100 m freestyle relay on the first day of the swimming competitions. On day three of the swimming competitions, she was beaten over 100 m breaststroke only by the surprising new World Champion Anna Elendt on the last meters of the race, finishing 0,08 seconds behind her, winning another silver medal in her first major international race over that distance. On day 5 of the event, she became World Champion for the first time over the 200 m breaststroke, one year after her Olympic victory over this distance. On day 6 of the event, she won her second gold medal, this time as part of the 4x100 m freestyle mixed relay, breaking the world record from the previous World Champions Australia from 2024. On the final day, she won the gold medal with her women's medley relay, setting a new world record, her second during this event.

=== 2026 ===
At the 2026 Pro Swim Series – Indianapolis, Douglass earned her first individual long course meters world record, in the 50 meter freestyle, with a time of 23.59 seconds, breaking the previous record held by Sarah Sjöström. About two months later that same year, Douglass again set the world record in the women’s 50-meter freestyle in the preliminary heats of the Pan Pacific Championships, with a time of 23.49 on August 15, 2026. Later that same day, she beat that record by winning the Pan Pacific Championships final with a women’s 50-meter freestyle time of 23.19 seconds.

== International championships ==
=== Long course (50 m) ===
| Meet | 50 free | 100 free | 100 breast | 200 breast | 50 fly | 200 indiv medley | 4×100 free | 4×100 medley | 4×100 mixed free | 4×100 mixed medley |
|---|---|---|---|---|---|---|---|---|---|---|
| OG 2021 | | | | | | 3rd place, bronze medalist(s) | | | | |
| WC 2022 | | | | 3rd place, bronze medalist(s) | | | 3rd place, bronze medalist(s) | | (bronze) ^{[a]} | |
| WC 2023 | | 4th | | 2nd place, silver medalist(s) | | 1st place, gold medalist(s) | 2nd place, silver medalist(s) | 1st place, gold medalist(s) | 2nd place, silver medalist(s) | 3rd place, bronze medalist(s) |
| WC 2024 | 2nd place, silver medalist(s) | 4th | | 2nd place, silver medalist(s) | | 1st place, gold medalist(s) | | | 3rd place, bronze medalist(s) | 1st place, gold medalist(s) |
| OG 2024 | | | | 1st place, gold medalist(s) | | 2nd place, silver medalist(s) | 2nd place, silver medalist(s) | (gold) ^{[a]} | | |
| WC 2025 | | | 2nd place, silver medalist(s) | 1st place, gold medalist(s) | 14th | | 2nd place, silver medalist(s) | 1st place, gold medalist(s) | 1st place, gold medalist(s) | |

=== Short course (25 m) ===
| Meet | 50 free | 100 free | 200 breast | 100 indiv medley | 200 indiv medley | 4×50 free | 4×100 free | 4×50 medley | 4×100 medley | 4×50 mixed free | 4×50 mixed medley |
|---|---|---|---|---|---|---|---|---|---|---|---|
| SCW 2021 | | | | | 3rd place, bronze medalist(s) | 1st place, gold medalist(s) | 1st place, gold medalist(s) | (silver) ^{[a]} | 4th^{[a]} | 4th | (silver) ^{[a]} |
| SCW 2022 | | | 1st place, gold medalist(s) | | 1st place, gold medalist(s) | 1st place, gold medalist(s) | 2nd place, silver medalist(s) | 2nd place, silver medalist(s) | 1st place, gold medalist(s) | | 1st place, gold medalist(s) |
| SCW 2024 | 2nd place, silver medalist(s) | 3rd place, bronze medalist(s) | 1st place, gold medalist(s) | 2nd place, silver medalist(s) | 1st place, gold medalist(s) | | 1st place, gold medalist(s) | | 1st place, gold medalist(s) | | |

^{a} Douglass swam only in the preliminary heats.

== Personal best times ==
=== Long course (50 m) ===
| Event | Time | Meet | Location | Date | Note(s) | Ref |
|---|---|---|---|---|---|---|
| 50 m freestyle | 23.19 | 2026 Pan Pacific Swimming Championships | Irvine, California, USA | August 15, 2026 | WR | |
| 100 m freestyle | 51.69 (r) | 2026 Pan Pacific Championships | Irvine, California, USA | August 14, 2026 | AM | |
| 200 m breaststroke | 2:18.50 | 2025 World Aquatics Championships | Singapore | August 1, 2025 | AM | |
| 100 m butterfly | 56.43 | 2023 U.S. National Championships | Indianapolis, Indiana, USA | June 29, 2023 | | |
| 200 m individual medley | 2:06.79 | 2024 U.S. Olympic Trials | Indianapolis, Indiana, USA | June 22, 2024 | US | |

=== Short course (25 m) ===
| Event | Time | Meet | Location | Date | Note(s) | Ref |
|---|---|---|---|---|---|---|
| 50 m freestyle | 23.05 | 2024 World Championships (25 m) | Budapest, Hungary | December 15, 2024 | | |
| 100 m freestyle | 49.93 | 2025 Toronto World Cup | Toronto, Canada | October 25, 2025 | WR | |
| 200 m breaststroke | 2:12.50 | 2024 World Championships (25 m) | Budapest, Hungary | December 13, 2024 | WR | |
| 50 m butterfly | 24.42 | 2024 World Cup | Singapore | November 1, 2024 | Former AM | |
| 100 m individual medley | 56.49 | 2024 World Championships (25 m) | Budapest, Hungary | December 13, 2024 | | |
| 200 m individual medley | 2:01.63 | 2024 World Championships (25 m) | Budapest, Hungary | December 10, 2024 | WR | |

=== Short course (25 yd) ===
| Event | Time | Meet | Location | Date | Note(s) | Ref |
|---|---|---|---|---|---|---|
| 50 yd freestyle | 20.84 | 2022 NCAA Division I Championships | Atlanta, Georgia, USA | March 17, 2022 | Former NR, US | |
| 100 yd freestyle | 45.86 | 2023 ACC Championships | Greensboro, North Carolina, USA | February 18, 2023 | | |
| 100 yd breaststroke | 58.14 | 2022 Tennessee Invitational | Knoxville, Tennessee, USA | November 18, 2022 | | |
| 200 yd breaststroke | 2:01.29 | 2023 NCAA Division I Championships | Knoxville, Tennessee, USA | March 18, 2023 | NR, US | |
| 100 yd butterfly | 48.46 | 2023 NCAA Division I Championships | Knoxville, Tennessee, USA | March 17, 2023 | Former NR, US | |
| 200 yd individual medley | 1:48.37 | 2023 NCAA Division I Championships | Knoxville, Tennessee, USA | March 16, 2023 | NR, US | |

Legend: WR – World record; AM – Americas record; e – equalled existing record; NR – American record; US – US Open record;
Records not set in finals: h – heat; sf – semifinal; r – relay 1st leg; rh – relay heat 1st leg; b – B final; † – en route to final mark; so – swim-off; tt – time trial

== World records ==
=== Short course (25 m) ===
| No. | Event | Time | Meet | Location | Date | Status | Ref |
|---|---|---|---|---|---|---|---|
| 1 | 200 m breaststroke | 2:14.16 | 2024 World Cup | Incheon, South Korea | October 24, 2024 | Former | |
| 2 | 200 m breaststroke | 2:12.72 | 2024 World Cup | Singapore | October 31, 2024 | Former | |
| 3 | 200 m individual medley | 2:01.63 | 2024 World Championships (25 m) | Budapest, Hungary | December 10, 2024 | Current | |
| 4 | 200 m breaststroke | 2:12.50 | 2024 World Championships (25 m) | Budapest, Hungary | December 13, 2024 | Current | |
| 5 | 100 m freestyle | 50.19 | 2025 World Cup | Westmont, United States | October 19, 2025 | Former | |
| 6 | 100 m freestyle | 49.93 | 2025 World Cup | Toronto, Canada | October 25, 2025 | Current | |

=== Long course (50 m) ===
| No. | Event | Time | Meet | Location | Date | Status | Ref |
|---|---|---|---|---|---|---|---|
| 1 | 50 m freestyle | 23.59 | TYR Pro Swim Series | Indianapolis, United States | June 19, 2026 | Former | |
| 2 | 50 m freestyle | 23.49 (h) | 2026 Pan Pacific Swimming Championships | Irvine, United States | August 15, 2026 | Former | |
| 3 | 50 m freestyle | 23.19 | 2026 Pan Pacific Swimming Championships | Irvine, United States | August 15, 2026 | Current | |

== Awards and honors ==
- Golden Goggle Award for Female Athlete of the Year – 2023 (tied with Katie Ledecky)
- Golden Goggle Award for Relay Performance of the Year – 2025
- Honda Sports Award for Swimming & Diving – 2022 and 2023
- College Swimming and Diving Coaches Association of America (CSCAA) Division I Women's Swimmer of the Year – 2022 and 2023
- Atlantic Coast Conference (ACC) Women's Swimmer of the Year – 2022 and 2023
- ACC Women's Swimming & Diving Scholar-Athlete of the Year – 2022 and 2023

Records
| Preceded by (Sweden) Sarah Sjöström (United States) Gretchen Walsh | Women's 50-metre freestyle world record-holder (long course); 19 – 28 June 2026; 15 August 2026 – present | Succeeded by (United States) Gretchen Walsh; Incumbent |
| Preceded by (United States) Regan Smith; Lilly King; Gretchen Walsh; Torri Huske | Women's 4 × 100-metre medley relay world record-holder (long course); 3 August 2025 – present | Succeeded by Incumbent |
| Preceded by (Australia) Cate Campbell | Women's 100-metre freestyle world record-holder (short course); 19 October 2025 – present | Succeeded by Incumbent |
| Preceded by (Russia) Yuliya Yefimova | Women's 200-metre breaststroke world record-holder (short course); 24 October 2024 – present | Succeeded by Incumbent |
| Preceded by (Hungary) Katinka Hosszú | Women's 200-metre IM world record-holder (short course); 10 December 2024 – present | Succeeded by Incumbent |
| Preceded by Sweden (Louise Hansson, Sophie Hansson, Sarah Sjöström, Michelle Coleman) | Women's 4 × 100-metre medley relay world record-holder (short course) with Claire Curzan, Lilly King, and Torri Huske; 18 December 2022 – present | Succeeded by Incumbent |
| Preceded by Netherlands (Kira Toussaint, Arno Kamminga, Maaike de Waard, Thom de Boer) | Mixed 4 × 50-metre medley relay world record-holder (short course) with Ryan Murphy, Nic Fink, and Torri Huske; 14 December 2022 – present | Succeeded by Incumbent |
