= 2021 NCAA Division I Women's Swimming and Diving Championships =

American college aquatic sports competition

- Host city: Greensboro, North Carolina
- Date: March 17-20, 2021
- Venue(s): Greensboro Aquatic Center; North Carolina State University

The 2021 NCAA Division I Women's Swimming and Diving Championships were contested from March 17-20, 2021 at the Greensboro Aquatic Center in Greensboro, North Carolina at the 39th annual NCAA-sanctioned swim meet to determine the team and individual national champions of Division I women's collegiate swimming and diving in the United States.

Hosted by the NC State Wolfpack of North Carolina State University and the Greensboro Sports Foundation, the meet was the first NCAA Swimming & Diving Championship to be held since 2019, after the 2020 edition was canceled due to the COVID-19 pandemic. Stringent guidelines were imposed at the meet to comply with public health standards in the face of the continuing pandemic.

The Virginia Cavaliers won the meet-- their first NCAA Swimming & Diving title and also the first in the Atlantic Coast Conference. NC State finished second, and Texas third. Maggie MacNeil of Michigan was named the CSCAA Women's Swimmer of the Year, and Sarah Bacon of Minnesota was named Women's Diver of the Year. Todd DeSorbo of Virginia was named the CSCAA Women's Team Coach of the Year and Minnesota's Wenbo Chen was named the Women's Diving Coach of the Year.

== Team standings ==
Rank	Team	Points
1st place, gold medalist(s)	Virginia	491
2nd place, silver medalist(s)	NC State (H)	354
3rd place, bronze medalist(s)	Texas	344.5
4	California	290
5	Alabama	266
6	Michigan	224.5
7	Ohio State	215.5
8	Georgia	181
9	Stanford ^{(DC)}	159
10	Tennessee	153

- (H) = Hosts
- ^{(DC)} = Defending champions
- Full results

== Swimming Results ==
Event	Gold		Silver		Bronze	
50 freestyle	Kate Douglass; Virginia	21.13	Maggie Mac Neil; Michigan	21.17	Sarah Thompson; Missouri	21.42
100 freestyle	Maggie Mac Neil; Michigan	46.02	Kate Douglass; Virginia	46.30	Isabel Ivey; California	46.95
200 freestyle	Paige Madden; Virginia	1:42.35	Talia Bates; Florida	1:43.49	Kelly Pash; Texas	1:43.50
500 freestyle	Paige Madden; Virginia	4:33.61	Evie Pfeifer; Texas	4:35.02	Brooke Forde; Stanford	4:35.22
1650 freestyle	Paige Madden; Virginia	15:41.86	Evie Pfeifer; Texas	15:46.41	Sierra Schmidt; Michigan	15:51.09
100 backstroke	Katharine Berkoff; NC State	49.74	Rhyan White; Alabama	50.21	Phoebe Bacon; Wisconsin	50.39
200 backstroke	Phoebe Bacon; Wisconsin	1:48.32	Rhyan White; Alabama	1:48.99	Isabelle Stadden; California	1:49.66
100 breaststroke	Sophie Hansson; NC State	57.23	Kaitlyn Dobler; Southern Cal	57.46	Alexis Wenger; Virginia	57.67
200 breaststroke	Sophie Hansson; NC State	2:03.86	Ella Nelson; Virginia	2:04.35	Mona McSharry; Tennessee	2:05.01
100 butterfly	Maggie Mac Neil; Michigan	48.89; US	Kate Douglass; Virginia	49.55	Kylee Alons; NC State	50.35
200 butterfly	Olivia Carter; Michigan	1:51.33	Olivia Bray; Texas	1:52.87	Dakota Luther; Georgia	1:53.01
200 IM	Alex Walsh; Virginia	1:51.87	Zoie Hartman; Georgia	1:53.34	Alicia Wilson; California	1:54.51
400 IM	Brooke Forde; Stanford	4:01.57	Ella Nelson; Virginia	4:02.33	Lauren Poole; Kentucky	4:02.73
200 freestyle relay	California; Eloise Riley (22.09); Emily Gantriis (21.23); Elise Garcia (21.24); Isabel Ivey (21.22)	1:25.78	Virginia; Kate Douglass (21.09); Lexi Cuomo (21.63); Kyla Valls (21.97); Alex Walsh (21.28)	1:25.97	NC State; Katharine Berkoff (21.81); Kylee Alons (21.27); Sirena Rowe (21.47); Sophie Hansson (21.72)	1:26.27
400 freestyle relay	Alabama; Morgan Scott (47.78); Kalia Antoniou (47.16); Flora Molnar (47.94); Cora Dupre (46.90)	3:09.78	Virginia; Kate Douglass (46.76); Paige Madden (47.98); Alex Walsh (47.63); Lexi Cuomo (48.08)	3:10.45	California; Robin Neumann (48.40); Emily Gantriis (48.20); Elise Garcia (47.94); Isabel Ivey (46.10)	3:10.64
800 freestyle relay	Virginia; Kyla Valls (1:44.64); Paige Madden (1:41.63); Ella Nelson (1:43.11); Alex Walsh (1:43.18)	6:52.56	Kentucky; Izzy Gati (1:44.27); Riley Gaines (1:42.81); Sophie Sorenson (1:44.97); Kaitlynn Wheeler (1:44.97)	6:57.02	California; Robin Neumann (1:44.09); Ayla Spitz (1:43.87); Rachel Klinker (1:44.98); Alicia Wilson (1:44.12)	6:57.06
200 medley relay	NC State; Katharine Berkoff (23.27); Sophie Hansson (25.92); Sirena Rowe (22.73); Kylee Alons (21.26)	1:33.18	Virginia; Caroline Gmelich (24.13); Alexis Wenger (26.41); Lexi Cuomo (22.40); Kate Douglass (21.19)	1:34.13	Ohio State; Emily Crane (23.92); Hannah Bach (26.58); Katherine Zenick (22.95); Taylor Petrak (21.51)	1:34.96
400 medley relay	NC State; Katharine Berkoff (50.07); Sophie Hansson (57.01); Kylee Alons (49.29); Julia Poole (48.22)	3:24.59; US	Virginia; Reilly Tiltmann (50.49); Alexis Wenger (57.71); Lexi Cuomo (50.62); Kate Douglass (46.31)	3:25.13	Texas; Julia Cook (51.78); Anna Elendt (58.05); Olivia Bray (50.43); Kelly Pash (47.57)	3:27.83

Legend: US – U.S. Open record;

== Diving Results ==
Event	Gold		Silver		Bronze	
1-meter	Sarah Bacon; Minnesota	357.20	Aranza Vazquez; North Carolina	348.45	Brooke Schultz; Arkansas	335.85
3-meter	Sarah Bacon; Minnesota	408.60	Aranza Vazquez; North Carolina	384.75	Camryn Hidalgo; Georgia Tech	356.40
Platform	Tamin Gilliland; Indiana	338.40	Delaney Schnell; Arizona	331.80	Macyey Vieta; Purdue	316.80

== Modifications due to COVID-19 ==
The following guidelines were imposed to comply with public health standards in light of the COVID-19 pandemic:

- No spectator seating was offered due to North Carolina public health restrictions (no exceptions for family/friends)
- No athletes were permitted on deck unless they were competing or using a warmup pool
- Team seating was socially-distanced- located in the observation stands at the Greensboro Aquatic Center
- Relay events were conducted as timed finals with an empty lane in between each team
  - Judges were removed from the deck area to improve social distancing. A high-speed camera system was in place to review relay exchanges
- Restrictions were tightened around alternate athletes:
  - Swimmers forced to withdraw from the meet due to a positive COVID-19 test could only be replaced within 24 hours of the selection announcement
  - Uninvited relay participants were required to swim in at least one relay in the meet, and were not permitted to fill alternate slots if a scratch occurred for any reason. Penalty for non-compliance was a disqualification of the team's final relay
- Teams received dedicated practice times and were not permitted in the facility outside of those times
- Teams and athletes not competing in a session were not permitted in the facility
  - Teams could identify up to two alternate athletes not competing in a session who would be permitted to enter the facility
- Teams only received two deck passes for swim coaches, and one deck pass for dive coaches. Coaches were not permitted to be on deck unless one of their athletes was competing at that time, and were expected to leave the deck at the end of the event
- Team recovery areas were not available within the Greensboro Aquatic Facility. Sports Medicine staff were permitted to operate within the neighboring Greensboro Coliseum
- Teams were tested for COVID-19 every other day over the course of the competition via nasal testing
  - At the Women's meet, there were no confirmed positive tests

== See also ==
- List of college swimming and diving teams
