= Virginia Cavaliers swimming and diving =

Athletic teams in the University of Virginia

Virginia Cavaliers
- Founded: Men's: 1925; Women's: 1974
- University: University of Virginia
- Athletic director: Carla Williams
- Head coach: Todd DeSorbo
- Conference: Atlantic Coast Conference
- Location: Charlottesville, Virginia, US
- Home pool: Aquatic and Fitness Center
- Nickname: Cavaliers
- Colors: Orange and blue

Women's NCAA Champions
- 2021, 2022, 2023, 2024, 2025, 2026

Men's Conference Champions
- 1987, 1990, 1999, 2000, 2001, 2002, 2003, 2004, 2005, 2006, 2008, 2009, 2010, 2011, 2012, 2013

Women's Conference Champions
- 1990, 1998, 1999, 2003, 2004, 2008, 2009, 2010, 2011, 2012, 2013, 2014, 2015, 2016, 2018, 2020, 2021, 2022, 2023, 2024, 2025,2026

The Virginia Cavaliers Swimming and Diving teams represent the University of Virginia in all National Collegiate Athletic Association (NCAA) Division I Swimming and Diving Events. In 2021, the women's side won the NCAA Championship, a first for any Atlantic Coast Conference team, and finished in the national top 10 for a third consecutive season. The men's side also finished in the national top 10 for the second consecutive season. In 2026, the women won their sixth consecutive NCAA Championship.

== History ==
Swimming and diving was introduced at the University of Virginia in 1925, when it was only a men's sport. It was introduced as a women's sport in 1974. Both the men's and women's teams have been successful in the Atlantic Coast Conference, with the men having won sixteen ACC championships, and the women having won 22 including 7 straight . The women won six consecutive NCAA Championships in 2021, 2022, 2023, 2024, 2025, and 2026. Virginia swimmers hold NCAA, U.S. Open, and American Records across multiple events.

== Roster ==
2023–24
Men (33)				Women (31)			
Name	Event	Hometown	Class	Name	Event	Hometown	Class
(United States) Jack Aikins	Back/Free/IM	Atlanta, GA	JR	(United States) Samantha Baron	Fly/IM	Bellevue, WA	SR
(United States) Hayden Bellotti	Free/Fly	Sugar Land, TX	FR	(United States) Ella Bathurst	Free/Back/IM	Tampa, FL	JR
(United States) Jack Berube	Back/Free	Dallas, TX	FR	(United States) Ruby Borzekowski	Diving	Takoma Park, MD	FR
(United States) Colin Bitz	Fly/IM	Owings Mills, MD	JR	(United States) Izzy Bradley	Free/Back	Charlottesville, VA	SO
(United States) Connor Boyle	Free	Naperville, IL	JR	(South Africa) Aimee Canny	Free/IM	Knysna, RSA	SO
(United States) Matt Brownstead	Free	Port Matilda, PA	SR	(New Zealand) Aimee Crosbie	Free	Auckland, NZL	FR
(United States) William Cole	Fly/Back/Free	Prospect, KY	SR	(United States) Claire Curzan	Free/Fly/Back	Cary, NC	SO
(United States) Tim Connery	Fly/Free/IM	Davidson, NC	JR	(United States) Maddie Donohoe	Distance	Annandale, VA	5Y
(United States) Teddy Cross	Back	Charlottesville, VA	SO	(United States) Cavan Gormsen	Distance	Wantagh, NY	FR
(United States) Tristen Davin	Back/Free/Fly	Littleton, CO	FR	(United States) Maddie Grosz	Diving	Vienna, VA	SR
(United States) Noah Dyer	Free	Herndon, VA	FR	(United States) Abby Harter	Fly/IM/Breast	Broadlands, VA	SR
(United States) Jay Gerloff	Breast	Chesapeake, VA	FR	(United States) Tess Howley	Fly/Back	Rockaway Beach, NY	FR
(United States) Patrick Gilhool	Back/Free/Fly	Bethlehem, PA	SO	(United States) Abby Kapeller	Fly/Back/Free	Excelsior, MN	JR
(United States) Matthew Heilman	Breast/IM	Crozet, VA	SO	(United States) Elizabeth Kaye	Diving	Atlanta, GA	JR
(United States) Tanner Hering	Free/IM	Greensboro, NC	SR	(United States) Anna Keating	Breast/IM	Vienna, VA	SR
(Japan) Alex Hotta	Free	Tokyo, JPN	SO	(United States) Sophia Knapp	Distance	Virginia Beach, VA	SO
(United States) Max Iida	Breast/IM	Glenview, IL	JR	(United States) Amanda Leizman	Diving	Beachwood, OH	SR
(United States) August Lamb	Free/Fly	Charlottesville, VA	5Y	(United States) Morgan Manley	Diving	Denver, CO	FR
(United States) Zach Larrick	Free/IM	Arcadia, CA	FR	(United States) Kate Morris	Fly/Free	Glen Ellyn, IL	JR
(United States) Simon Lins	Free	Oakland, CA	FR	(United States) Lainey Mullins	Free/Fly/IM	Hockessin, DE	FR
(United States) Jack Madoch	Free/Fly	Middleton, WI	FR	(United States) Ella Nelson	Breast/IM	Nashville, TN	5Y
(United States) Oliver Mills	Diving	Alexandria, VA	SR	(Italy) Jasmine Nocentini	Free/Breast	Padova, ITA	5Y
(United States) Jack Moore	Free/IM	Ashburn, VA	SR	(United States) Carly Novelline	Free/Back	Wilmette, IL	SO
(United States) Kamal Muhammad	Fly/Free/IM	Atlanta, GA	SO	(United States) Maxine Parker	Free	Bannockburn, IL	SR
(United States) Noah Nichols	Breast/IM	Midlothian, VA	SR	(United States) Maggie Schalow	Free/Fly	Corona Del Mar, CA	FR
(United States) Sam O'Brien	Back/Free	Round Hill, VA	SO	(United States) Zoe Skirboll	Breast/IM	Pittsburgh, PA	SO
(United States) Nicholas Sanders	Diving	Boulder, CO	JR	(United States) Reilly Tiltmann	Fly/Back/Free	Brookfield, WI	JR
(United States) Sebastien Sergile	Fly/Free	Alpharetta, GA	SO	(United States) Alex Walsh	Back/Breast/IM	Nashville, TN	SR
(United States) Matthew Styczen	IM	Saylorsburg, PA	JR	(United States) Gretchen Walsh	Free/Fly/Back	Nashville, TN	JR
(United States) Will Tenpas	Breast/IM	Chevy Chase, MD	5Y	(United States) Emma Weber	Breast/IM	Denver, CO	SO
(United States) Peter Thompson	Free/IM	Billings, MT	JR	(United Kingdom) Sophia Wilson	Back/IM	Guildford, GBR	SR
(United States) Will Thompson	Back/Free	Chapel Hill, NC	FR				
(United States) Dean Treanor	Diving	Cornelius, NC	FR				

== Facility ==
The University of Virginia Aquatic and Fitness Center opened in 1996. This building was a big accomplishment for the team, previously one of two national top 20 teams without an Olympic-sized swimming pool. The Aquatic and Fitness Center was built not only with a 50-meter Olympic-sized pool, but also with a warm-water pool, whirlpool and sauna, classrooms, fitness areas, locker rooms, a bookstore, and a dining area. The $18.5 million facility features a 50-meter pool that converts to a short course 25-yard pool, as well as state of the art lane lines and gutters. The facility underwent renovation in 2004, adding a three-court gymnasium, indoor running track, multipurpose rooms, a cycling room, and free weight and cardiovascular areas were added.

== Team records ==
All times are in Short Course Yards (SCY). Red highlight denotes an American Record, blue highlight denotes both an American Record and an NCAA Record, green highlight denotes an NCAA Record.

=== Men ===
Virginia Men's Team Records
Event	Record	Holder	Meet	Date
50 Freestyle	18.60	Matt Brownstead	2022 NCAA Division I Men's Championship	3/24/2022
100 Freestyle	41.22	Matt Brownstead	2022 NCAA Division I Men's Championship	3/26/2022
200 Freestyle	1:31.84	David King	2025 NCAA Division I Men's Championship	3/26/2025
500 Freestyle	4:10.00	Matt McLean	2009 Atlantic Coast Championship (Men)	2/26/2009
1000 Freestyle	8:46.50	Matt McLean	2009 Atlantic Coast Championship (Men)	2/28/2009
1650 Freestyle	14:35.12	Matt McLean	2009 Atlantic Coast Championship (Men)	2/28/2009
100 Backstroke	45.05	Matt Brownstead	2024 NCAA Division I Men's Championship	3/29/2024
200 Backstroke	1:38.36	David King	2025 Atlantic Coast Championship (Men)	2/22/2025
100 Breaststroke	50.82	Noah Nichols	2023 Atlantic Coast Championship (Men)	2/17/2023
200 Breaststroke	1:50.69	Noah Nichols	2024 NCAA Division I Men's Championship	3/30/2024
100 Butterfly	44.41	Spencer Nicholas	2024 Tennessee Invitational	11/21/2024
200 Butterfly	1:39.09	Thomas Heilman	2025 CSCAA Dual Challenge (Michigan, Virginia, Arizona St, Tennessee)	11/22/2025
200 Individual Medley	1:41.61	Maximus Williamson	2025 CSCAA Dual Challenge (Michigan, Virginia, Arizona St, Tennessee)	11/22/2025
400 Individual Medley	3:38.43	Brendan Casey	2019 NCAA Division I Men's Championship	3/29/2019
1 Meter Diving (6)	390.83	JB Kolod		2014
3 Meter Diving (6)	444.75	JB Kolod		2014
Platform Diving	405.25	JB Kolod		2015
200 Freestyle Relay	1:14.47	Matt Brownstead	2022 Atlantic Coast Championship (Men)	2/16/2022
200 Freestyle Relay	1:14.47	Matt King	2022 Atlantic Coast Championship (Men)	2/16/2022
200 Freestyle Relay	1:14.47	Connor Boyle	2022 Atlantic Coast Championship (Men)	2/16/2022
200 Freestyle Relay	1:14.47	August Lamb	2022 Atlantic Coast Championship (Men)	2/16/2022
400 Freestyle Relay	2:46.45	Matt Brownstead	2022 Atlantic Coast Championship (Men)	2/19/2022
400 Freestyle Relay	2:46.45	Jack Aikins	2022 Atlantic Coast Championship (Men)	2/19/2022
400 Freestyle Relay	2:46.45	Connor Boyle	2022 Atlantic Coast Championship (Men)	2/19/2022
400 Freestyle Relay	2:46.45	Matt King	2022 Atlantic Coast Championship (Men)	2/19/2022
800 Freestyle Relay	6:11.30	David King	2025 NCAA Division I Men's Championship	3/26/2025
800 Freestyle Relay	6:11.30	Sebastien Sergile	2025 NCAA Division I Men's Championship	3/26/2025
800 Freestyle Relay	6:11.30	Jack Aikins	2025 NCAA Division I Men's Championship	3/26/2025
800 Freestyle Relay	6:11.30	Hayden Bellotti	2025 NCAA Division I Men's Championship	3/26/2025
200 Medley Relay	1:22.51	Matt Brownstead	2023 Atlantic Coast Championship (Men)	2/14/2023
200 Medley Relay	1:22.51	Noah Nichols	2023 Atlantic Coast Championship (Men)	2/14/2023
200 Medley Relay	1:22.51	Max Edwards	2023 Atlantic Coast Championship (Men)	2/14/2023
200 Medley Relay	1:22.51	August Lamb	2023 Atlantic Coast Championship (Men)	2/14/2023
400 Medley Relay	3:02.01	Jack Aikins	2024 Tennessee Invitational	11/20/2024
400 Medley Relay	3:02.01	Noah Nichols	2024 Tennessee Invitational	11/20/2024
400 Medley Relay	3:02.01	Spencer Nicholas	2024 Tennessee Invitational	11/20/2024
400 Medley Relay	3:02.01	Connor Boyle	2024 Tennessee Invitational	11/20/2024

=== Women ===
Virginia Women's Team Records
Event	Record	Holder	Meet	Date
50 Freestyle	20.37	Gretchen Walsh	2024 NCAA Division I Women's Championship	3/21/2024
100 Freestyle	44.71	Gretchen Walsh	2025 NCAA Division I Women's Championship	3/22/2025
200 Freestyle	1:39.23	Anna Moesch	2026 NCAA division women's Championship (Women)	3/22/2026
500 Freestyle	4:28.90	Leah Smith	2017 NCAA Division I Women's Championship	3/16/2017
1000 Freestyle	9:20.15	Leah Smith	2016 Atlantic Coast Championship (Women)	2/20/2016
1650 Freestyle	15:25.30	Leah Smith	2016 Atlantic Coast Championship (Women)	2/20/2016
100 Backstroke	48.10	Gretchen Walsh	2024 Atlantic Coast Championship (Women)	2/23/2024
200 Backstroke	1:46.10	Claire Curzan	2026 NCAA Division I Women's Championship	3/22/2026
100 Breaststroke	56.09	Jasmine Nocentini	2024 NCAA Division I Women's Championship	3/22/2024
200 Breaststroke	2:01.29	Kate Douglass	2023 NCAA Division I Women's Championship	3/18/2023
100 Butterfly	46.97	Gretchen Walsh	2025 NCAA Division I Women's Championship	3/21/2025
200 Butterfly	1:49.16	Alex Walsh	2024 Atlantic Coast Championship (Women)	2/23/2024
200 Individual Medley	1:48.37	Kate Douglass	2023 NCAA Division I Women's Championship	3/16/2023
400 Individual Medley	3:55.97	Alex Walsh	2024 NCAA Division I Women's Championship	3/22/2024
1 Meter Diving	335.00	Sydney Dusel		2017
3 Meter Diving	392.25	Kylie Towbin		2018
Platform Diving	297.85	Kylie Towbin		2018
200 Freestyle Relay	1:23.63	Jasmine Nocentini	2024 Atlantic Coast Championship (Women)	2/21/2024
200 Freestyle Relay	1:23.63	Gretchen Walsh	2024 Atlantic Coast Championship (Women)	2/21/2024
200 Freestyle Relay	1:23.63	Alex Walsh	2024 Atlantic Coast Championship (Women)	2/21/2024
200 Freestyle Relay	1:23.63	Maxine Parker	2024 Atlantic Coast Championship (Women)	2/21/2024
400 Freestyle Relay	3:05.84	Gretchen Walsh	2023 NCAA Division I Women's Championship	3/18/2023
400 Freestyle Relay	3:05.84	Kate Douglass	2023 NCAA Division I Women's Championship	3/18/2023
400 Freestyle Relay	3:05.84	Lexi Cuomo	2023 NCAA Division I Women's Championship	3/18/2023
400 Freestyle Relay	3:05.84	Alex Walsh	2023 NCAA Division I Women's Championship	3/18/2023
800 Freestyle Relay	6:44.13	Gretchen Walsh	2024 Atlantic Coast Championship (Women)	2/20/2024
800 Freestyle Relay	6:44.13	Alex Walsh	2024 Atlantic Coast Championship (Women)	2/20/2024
800 Freestyle Relay	6:44.13	Aimee Canny	2024 Atlantic Coast Championship (Women)	2/20/2024
800 Freestyle Relay	6:44.13	Claire Curzan	2024 Atlantic Coast Championship (Women)	2/20/2024
200 Medley Relay	1:31.10	Claire Curzan	2025 NCAA Division I Women's Championship	3/19/2025
200 Medley Relay	1:31.10	Alex Walsh	2025 NCAA Division I Women's Championship	3/19/2025
200 Medley Relay	1:31.10	Gretchen Walsh	2025 NCAA Division I Women's Championship	3/19/2025
200 Medley Relay	1:31.10	Maxine Parker	2025 NCAA Division I Women's Championship	3/19/2025
400 Medley Relay	3:19.58	Claire Curzan	2025 Atlantic Coast Championship (Women)	2/21/2025
400 Medley Relay	3:19.58	Alex Walsh	2025 Atlantic Coast Championship (Women)	2/21/2025
400 Medley Relay	3:19.58	Gretchen Walsh	2025 Atlantic Coast Championship (Women)	2/21/2025
400 Medley Relay	3:19.58	Anna Moesch	2025 Atlantic Coast Championship (Women)	2/21/2025

== Yearly records ==
=== Men ===
Statistics overview
Season	Coach	Overall	Conference	Standing	Postseason
Unknown (Southern Conference) (1925–1935)
1925–26	Unknown	1–0–0			
1926–27	Unknown	2–0–0			
1927–28	Unknown	2–2–0			
1928–29	Unknown	3–1–1			
1929–30	Unknown	4–2–0			
1930–31	Unknown	5–1–0			
1931–32	Unknown	5–1–0			
1932–33	Unknown	3–3–0			
1933–34	Unknown	4–2–0			
1934–35	Unknown	4–2–1			
John Montague (Southern Conference) (1935–1936)
1935–36	John Montague	5–1–0			
John Montague:		5–1–0 (.833)			
Unknown (Southern Conference) (1936–1937)
1936–37	Unknown	1–5–0			
Unknown:		34–19–2 (.636)			
Douglas Lund (Independent) (1937–1939)
1937–38	Douglas Lund	5–2–0			
1938–39	Douglas Lund	7–0–0			
Douglas Lund:		12–2–0 (.857)			
Hollis Fitch (Independent) (1939–1940)
1939–40	Hollis Fitch	3–6–0			
Hollis Fitch:		3–6–0 (.333)			
R.C. Heidloff (Independent) (1940–1948)
1940–41	R.C. Heidloff	3–4–0			
1941–42	R.C. Heidloff	3–4–0			
1946–47	R.C. Heidloff	2–3–0			
1947–48	R.C. Heidloff	3–3–0			
R.C. Heidloff:		11–14–0 (.440)			
Marlin McKenzie (Independent) (1948–1950)
1948–49	Marlin McKenzie	2–5–0			
1949–50	Marlin McKenzie	4–4–0			
Marlin McKenzie:		6–9–0 (.400)			
James H. Reilly (Independent) (1950–1953)
1950–51	James H. Reilly	4–3–0			
1951–52	James H. Reilly	7–2–0			
1952–53	James H. Reilly	7–5–0			
James H. Reilly (Atlantic Coast Conference) (1953–1958)
1953–54	James H. Reilly	3–3–0	0–2–0		
1954–55	James H. Reilly	2–6–0	0–3–0		
1955–56	James H. Reilly	2–7–0	2–3–0		
1956–57	James H. Reilly	4–7–1	2–4–1		
1957–58	James H. Reilly	3–8–0	2–5–0		
James H. Reilly:		32–41–1 (.439)	6–17–1 (.271)		
Richard Marcus (Atlantic Coast Conference) (1958–1960)
1958–59	Richard Marcus	7–4–0	4–3–0		
1959–60	Richard Marcus	4–7–0	3–4–0		
Richard Marcus:		11–11–0 (.500)	7–7–0 (.500)		
Michael Armstrong (Atlantic Coast Conference) (1960–1962)
1960–61	Michael Armstrong	2–9–0	2–5–0		
1961–62	Michael Armstrong	1–8–0	1–5–0	5th	
Michael Armstrong:		3–17–0 (.150)	3–10–0 (.231)		
Ralph L. Law (Atlantic Coast Conference) (1962–1969)
1962–63	Ralph L. Law	6–5–0	3–4–0	5th	
1963–64	Ralph L. Law	5–6–0	3–4–0	6th	
1964–65	Ralph L. Law	3–8–0	3–4–0	7th	
1965–66	Ralph L. Law	7–3–0	1–3–0	6th	
1966–67	Ralph L. Law	8–2–0	2–1–0	5th	
1967–68	Ralph L. Law	8–2–0	2–1–0	5th	
1968–69	Ralph L. Law	8–2–0	2–1–0	5th	
Ralph L. Law:		45–28–0 (.616)	16–18–0 (.364)		
Ron Good (Atlantic Coast Conference) (1969–1978)
1969–70	Ron Good	7–3–1	2–2–0	5th	
1970–71	Ron Good	7–4–0	0–3–0	5th	
1971–72	Ron Good	2–6–0	0–2–0	5th	
1972–73	Ron Good	8–3–0	2–2–0	5th	
1973–74	Ron Good	8–4–0	2–3–0	5th	
1974–75	Ron Good	8–3–0	2–2–0	5th	
1975–76	Ron Good	7–1–0	2–1–0	3rd	
1976–77	Ron Good	6–4–0	1–4–0	5th	
1977–78	Ron Good	2–5–0	0–5–0	6th	
Ron Good:		55–33–1 (.624)	11–24 (.314)		
Mark Bernardino (Atlantic Coast Conference) (1978–2013)
1978–79	Mark Bernardino	4–5–0	1–3–0	6th	
1979–80	Mark Bernardino	6–5–0	3–3–0	4th	
1980–81	Mark Bernardino	5–3–0	2–3–0	4th	T23rd
1981–82	Mark Bernardino	4–4–0	2–3–0	4th	T24th
1982–83	Mark Bernardino	7–2–0	3–2–0	3rd	25th
1983–84	Mark Bernardino	5–4–0	1–4–0	4th	
1984–85	Mark Bernardino	5–8–0	1–4–0	4th	
1985–86	Mark Bernardino	8–6–0	2–2–0	3rd	
1986–87	Mark Bernardino	7–1–0	5–0–0	1st	T33rd
1987–88	Mark Bernardino	7–3–0	4–1–0	2nd	22nd
1988–89	Mark Bernardino	6–3–0	3–2–0	2nd	19th
1989–90	Mark Bernardino	8–1–0	4–1–0	1st	26th
1990–91	Mark Bernardino	4–5–0	1–4–0	3rd	T30th
1991–92	Mark Bernardino	10–1–0	6–0–0	2nd	19th
1992–93	Mark Bernardino	10–0–0	6–0–0	2nd	23rd
1993–94	Mark Bernardino	6–5–0	3–3–0	2nd	22nd
1994–95	Mark Bernardino	8–5–0	2–3–0	4th	T26th
1995–96	Mark Bernardino	5–8–0	2–3–0	5th	
1996–97	Mark Bernardino	5–6–0	2–3–0	4th	T20th
1997–98	Mark Bernardino	8–1–0	4–1–0	2nd	T17th
1998–99	Mark Bernardino	7–3–0	4–2–0	1st	14th
1999–00	Mark Bernardino	7–1–0	4–1–0	1st	12th
2000–01	Mark Bernardino	8–1–0	5–0–0	1st	13th
2001–02	Mark Bernardino	8–2–0	5–0–0	1st	11th
2002–03	Mark Bernardino	8–1–0	5–0–0	1st	10th
2003–04	Mark Bernardino	10–1–0	6–0–0	1st	13th
2004–05	Mark Bernardino	10–1–0	5–0–0	1st	13th
2005–06	Mark Bernardino	9–3–0	5–0–0	1st	18th
2006–07	Mark Bernardino	8–2–0	6–0–0	2nd	16th
2007–08	Mark Bernardino	7–3–0	3–1–0	1st	15th
2008–09	Mark Bernardino	9–2–0	5–0–0	1st	9th
2009–10	Mark Bernardino	9–1–0	5–0–0	1st	10th
2010–11	Mark Bernardino	8–1–0	3–0–0	1st	8th
2011–12	Mark Bernardino	5–3–0	3–1–0	1st	15th
2012–13	Mark Bernardino	8–1–0	3–0–0	1st	27th
Mark Bernardino:		249–102–0 (.709)	124–50–0 (.713)		
Augie Busch (Atlantic Coast Conference) (2013–2017)
2013–14	Augie Busch	6–5–0	2–3–0	4th	26th
2014–15	Augie Busch	1–5–0	0–3–0	8th	T33rd
2015–16	Augie Busch	3–5–0	1–3–0	6th	T28th
2016–17	Augie Busch	5–2–0	4–1–0	6th	
Augie Busch:		14–17–0 (.452)	7–10–0 (.412)		
Todd DeSorbo (Atlantic Coast Conference) (2017–present)
2017–18	Todd DeSorbo	6–4–0	3–3–0	3rd	29th
2018–19	Todd DeSorbo	6–2–0	3–2–0	3rd	10th
2019–20	Todd DeSorbo	3–3–0	1–2–0	2nd	Canceled
2020–21	Todd DeSorbo	5–1–0	2–1–0	4th	9th
2021–22	Todd DeSorbo	2–4–0	1–2–0	4th	10th
2022–23	Todd DeSorbo	4–5–0	1–2–0	4th	15th
2023–24	Todd DeSorbo	3–3–0	1–2–0	5th	17th
Todd DeSorbo:		29–22–0 (.569)	12–14–0 (.462)		
Total:		509–322–4 (.612)	186–150–1 (.553)		
National champion Postseason invitational champion Conference regular season champion Conference regular season and conference tournament champion Division regular season champion Division regular season and conference tournament champion Conference tournament champion

=== Women ===
Statistics overview
Season	Coach	Overall	Conference	Standing	Postseason
Ron Good (Atlantic Coast Conference) (1974–1978)
1974–75	Ron Good	10–1–0			
1975–76	Ron Good	6–2–0			
1976–77	Ron Good	6–2–0			
1977–78	Ron Good	2–4–0			
Ron Good:		24–9–0 (.727)			
Mark Bernardino (Atlantic Coast Conference) (1978–2013)
1978–79	Mark Bernardino	6–3–0	1–2–0	5th	
1979–80	Mark Bernardino	7–5–0	2–3–0	4th	
1980–81	Mark Bernardino	3–5–0	1–4–0	4th	
1981–82	Mark Bernardino	3–5–0	2–3–0	3rd	13th
1982–83	Mark Bernardino	6–3–0	3–2–0	2nd	20th
1983–84	Mark Bernardino	7–2–0	3–2–0	2nd	19th
1984–85	Mark Bernardino	10–3–1	3–2–0	2nd	27th
1985–86	Mark Bernardino	7–4–0	3–1–0	2nd	14th
1986–87	Mark Bernardino	4–3–0	3–2–0	1st	24th
1987–88	Mark Bernardino	9–2–0	4–1–0	3rd	7th
1988–89	Mark Bernardino	7–2–0	3–2–0	1st	T23rd
1989–90	Mark Bernardino	8–1–0	4–1–0	1st	11th
1990–91	Mark Bernardino	6–3–0	3–2–0	2nd	25th
1991–92	Mark Bernardino	9–1–0	5–1–0	3rd	32nd
1992–93	Mark Bernardino	9–1–0	5–1–0	2nd	26th
1993–94	Mark Bernardino	9–3–0	5–1–0	2nd	T33rd
1994–95	Mark Bernardino	11–2–0	4–1–0	2nd	T33rd
1995–96	Mark Bernardino	7–6–0	2–3–0	2nd	
1996–97	Mark Bernardino	8–2–0	4–1–0	3rd	T28th
1997–98	Mark Bernardino	7–2–0	3–2–0	1st	18th
1998–99	Mark Bernardino	9–0–0	6–0–0	1st	10th
1999–00	Mark Bernardino	8–0–0	5–0–0	2nd	T9th
2000–01	Mark Bernardino	7–1–0	4–1–0	2nd	12th
2001–02	Mark Bernardino	9–1–0	4–1–0	2nd	12th
2002–03	Mark Bernardino	7–1–0	4–1–0	1st	13th
2003–04	Mark Bernardino	6–4–0	4–2–0	1st	19th
2004–05	Mark Bernardino	10–2–0	5–1–0	2nd	26th
2005–06	Mark Bernardino	6–3–0	5–0–0	2nd	T23rd
2006–07	Mark Bernardino	7–3–0	5–1–0	3rd	39th
2007–08	Mark Bernardino	8–2–0	4–0–0	1st	20th
2008–09	Mark Bernardino	9–1–0	5–0–0	1st	12th
2009–10	Mark Bernardino	9–1–0	5–0–0	1st	9th
2010–11	Mark Bernardino	6–2–0	3–0–0	1st	13th
2011–12	Mark Bernardino	8–0–0	4–0–0	1st	17th
2012–13	Mark Bernardino	9–0–0	3–0–0	1st	18th
Mark Bernardino:		261–79–1 (.767)	261–79–1 (.767)		
Augie Busch (Atlantic Coast Conference) (2013–2017)
2013–14	Augie Busch	11–1–0	6–0–0	1st	11th
2014–15	Augie Busch	3–2–0	2–1–0	1st	5th
2015–16	Augie Busch	8–0–0	4–0–0	1st	5th
2016–17	Augie Busch	6–1–0	4–1–0	2nd	12th
Augie Busch:		28–4–0 (.875)	16–2–0 (.889)		
Todd DeSorbo (Atlantic Coast Conference) (2017–present)
2017–18	Todd DeSorbo	10–0–0	5–0–0	1st	9th
2018–19	Todd DeSorbo	6–2–0	4–1–0	2nd	6th
2019–20	Todd DeSorbo	5–1–0	3–0–0	1st	Canceled
2020–21	Todd DeSorbo	6–0–0	3-0–0	1st	1st
2021–22	Todd DeSorbo	6–0–0	3-0–0	1st	1st
2022–23	Todd DeSorbo	8–1–0	3-0–0	1st	1st
2023–24	Todd DeSorbo	6–0–0	3-0–0	1st	1st
Todd DeSorbo:		47–4–0 (.922)	24–1–0 (.960)		
Total:		349–95–1 (.785)	163–47–0 (.776)		
National champion Postseason invitational champion Conference regular season champion Conference regular season and conference tournament champion Division regular season champion Division regular season and conference tournament champion Conference tournament champion

== Championships ==
=== Team NCAA Championships ===
Women (6)

Virginia Cavaliers NCAA Championships						
Year	Team	National Champion	Score	Runner-Up	Score	Location
2026	Women	Virginia	589	Stanford	380.5	Atlanta, GA
2025	Women	Virginia	544	Stanford	417	Federal Way, WA
2024	Women	Virginia	527.5	Texas	441	Athens, GA
2023	Women	Virginia	542	Texas	415	Knoxville, TN
2022	Women	Virginia	551.5	Texas	406	Atlanta, GA
2021	Women	Virginia	491	NC State	354	Greensboro, NC

=== Team ACC Championships ===
Women (22)

Men (16)

Virginia Cavaliers Atlantic Coast Conference Championships
Team	Score	Location
Women	1410.5	Atlanta, GA
Women	1451.5	Greensboro, NC
Women	1637.5*	Greensboro, NC
Women	1536*	Greensboro, NC
Women	1418	Atlanta, GA
Women	1486	Greensboro, NC
Women	1492.5	Greensboro, NC
Women	1382	Greensboro, NC
Women	1332.5	Greensboro, NC
Women	1308.5	Atlanta, GA
Women	1433	Greensboro, NC
Men	759.5	Greensboro, NC
Women	832	Greensboro, NC
Men	626.5	Christiansburg, VA
Women	848	Christiansburg, VA
Men	820	Atlanta, GA
Women	776	Atlanta, GA
Men	806	Chapel Hill, NC
Women	877.5	Chapel Hill, NC
Men	832	College Park, MD
Women	848	College Park, MD
Men	833	Atlanta, GA
Women	800	Atlanta, GA
Men	694	College Park, MD
Men	726.5	Atlanta, GA
Men	848.5	Charlottesville, VA
Women	675	Charlottesville, VA
Men	780	Chapel Hill, NC
Women	710	Chapel Hill, NC
Men	872	College Park, MD
Men	883.5	Charlottesville, VA
Men	801	Chapel Hill, NC
Men	704	College Park, MD
Women	766.5	College Park, MD
Women	818	Charlottesville, VA
Men	769	Raleigh, NC
Women	766.5	Raleigh, NC
Men	754	Chapel Hill, NC
*ACC Record

=== NCAA Champions ===
Title Summary
Men			Women		
Individual	Relay	Total	Individual	Relay	Total
4	0	4	25	10	35

Virginia's NCAA Swimming & Diving Champions
Meet	Name	Event	Time
2023 Women's NCAAs (Knoxville, TN); Individual Titles: 6 Relay Titles: 5 Total Titles: 11	Kate Douglass	400 Freestyle Relay	3:05.84
2023 Women's NCAAs (Knoxville, TN); Individual Titles: 6 Relay Titles: 5 Total Titles: 11	Alex Walsh	400 Freestyle Relay	3:05.84
2023 Women's NCAAs (Knoxville, TN); Individual Titles: 6 Relay Titles: 5 Total Titles: 11	Maxine Parker	400 Freestyle Relay	3:05.84
2023 Women's NCAAs (Knoxville, TN); Individual Titles: 6 Relay Titles: 5 Total Titles: 11	Gretchen Walsh	400 Freestyle Relay	3:05.84
2023 Women's NCAAs (Knoxville, TN); Individual Titles: 6 Relay Titles: 5 Total Titles: 11	Gretchen Walsh	100 Backstroke	48.26
2023 Women's NCAAs (Knoxville, TN); Individual Titles: 6 Relay Titles: 5 Total Titles: 11	Kate Douglass	200 Breaststroke	2:01.29
2023 Women's NCAAs (Knoxville, TN); Individual Titles: 6 Relay Titles: 5 Total Titles: 11	Gretchen Walsh	100 Freestyle	45.61
2023 Women's NCAAs (Knoxville, TN); Individual Titles: 6 Relay Titles: 5 Total Titles: 11	Gretchen Walsh	400 Medley Relay	3:22.39
2023 Women's NCAAs (Knoxville, TN); Individual Titles: 6 Relay Titles: 5 Total Titles: 11	Alex Walsh	400 Medley Relay	3:22.39
2023 Women's NCAAs (Knoxville, TN); Individual Titles: 6 Relay Titles: 5 Total Titles: 11	Kate Douglass	400 Medley Relay	3:22.39
2023 Women's NCAAs (Knoxville, TN); Individual Titles: 6 Relay Titles: 5 Total Titles: 11	Aimee Canny	400 Medley Relay	3:22.39
2023 Women's NCAAs (Knoxville, TN); Individual Titles: 6 Relay Titles: 5 Total Titles: 11	Kate Douglass	100 Butterfly	48.46
2023 Women's NCAAs (Knoxville, TN); Individual Titles: 6 Relay Titles: 5 Total Titles: 11	Alex Walsh	400 Individual Medley	3:57.24
2023 Women's NCAAs (Knoxville, TN); Individual Titles: 6 Relay Titles: 5 Total Titles: 11	Kate Douglass	200 Freestyle Relay	1:24.51
2023 Women's NCAAs (Knoxville, TN); Individual Titles: 6 Relay Titles: 5 Total Titles: 11	Gretchen Walsh	200 Freestyle Relay	1:24.51
2023 Women's NCAAs (Knoxville, TN); Individual Titles: 6 Relay Titles: 5 Total Titles: 11	Lexi Cuomo	200 Freestyle Relay	1:24.51
2023 Women's NCAAs (Knoxville, TN); Individual Titles: 6 Relay Titles: 5 Total Titles: 11	Maxine Parker	200 Freestyle Relay	1:24.51
2023 Women's NCAAs (Knoxville, TN); Individual Titles: 6 Relay Titles: 5 Total Titles: 11	Kate Douglass	200 Individual Medley	1:48.37
2023 Women's NCAAs (Knoxville, TN); Individual Titles: 6 Relay Titles: 5 Total Titles: 11	Aimee Canny	800 Free Relay	6:49.82
2023 Women's NCAAs (Knoxville, TN); Individual Titles: 6 Relay Titles: 5 Total Titles: 11	Alex Walsh	800 Free Relay	6:49.82
2023 Women's NCAAs (Knoxville, TN); Individual Titles: 6 Relay Titles: 5 Total Titles: 11	Reilly Tiltmann	800 Free Relay	6:49.82
2023 Women's NCAAs (Knoxville, TN); Individual Titles: 6 Relay Titles: 5 Total Titles: 11	Ella Nelson	800 Free Relay	6:49.82
2023 Women's NCAAs (Knoxville, TN); Individual Titles: 6 Relay Titles: 5 Total Titles: 11	Gretchen Walsh	200 Medley Relay	1:31.51
2023 Women's NCAAs (Knoxville, TN); Individual Titles: 6 Relay Titles: 5 Total Titles: 11	Alex Walsh	200 Medley Relay	1:31.51
2023 Women's NCAAs (Knoxville, TN); Individual Titles: 6 Relay Titles: 5 Total Titles: 11	Lexi Cuomo	200 Medley Relay	1:31.51
2023 Women's NCAAs (Knoxville, TN); Individual Titles: 6 Relay Titles: 5 Total Titles: 11	Kate Douglass	200 Medley Relay	1:31.51
2022 Women's NCAAs (Atlanta, GA); Individual Titles: 7 Relay Titles: 4 Total Titles: 11	Kate Douglass	400 Freestyle Relay	3:06.91
2022 Women's NCAAs (Atlanta, GA); Individual Titles: 7 Relay Titles: 4 Total Titles: 11	Alex Walsh	400 Freestyle Relay	3:06.91
2022 Women's NCAAs (Atlanta, GA); Individual Titles: 7 Relay Titles: 4 Total Titles: 11	Reilly Tiltmann	400 Freestyle Relay	3:06.91
2022 Women's NCAAs (Atlanta, GA); Individual Titles: 7 Relay Titles: 4 Total Titles: 11	Gretchen Walsh	400 Freestyle Relay	3:06.91
2022 Women's NCAAs (Atlanta, GA); Individual Titles: 7 Relay Titles: 4 Total Titles: 11	Alex Walsh	200 Butterfly	1:50.79
2022 Women's NCAAs (Atlanta, GA); Individual Titles: 7 Relay Titles: 4 Total Titles: 11	Kate Douglass	200 Breaststroke	2:02.19
2022 Women's NCAAs (Atlanta, GA); Individual Titles: 7 Relay Titles: 4 Total Titles: 11	Gretchen Walsh	100 Freestyle	46.05
2022 Women's NCAAs (Atlanta, GA); Individual Titles: 7 Relay Titles: 4 Total Titles: 11	Gretchen Walsh	400 Medley Relay	3:22.34
2022 Women's NCAAs (Atlanta, GA); Individual Titles: 7 Relay Titles: 4 Total Titles: 11	Alexis Wenger	400 Medley Relay	3:22.34
2022 Women's NCAAs (Atlanta, GA); Individual Titles: 7 Relay Titles: 4 Total Titles: 11	Alex Walsh	400 Medley Relay	3:22.34
2022 Women's NCAAs (Atlanta, GA); Individual Titles: 7 Relay Titles: 4 Total Titles: 11	Kate Douglass	400 Medley Relay	3:22.34
2022 Women's NCAAs (Atlanta, GA); Individual Titles: 7 Relay Titles: 4 Total Titles: 11	Kate Douglass	100 Butterfly	49.04
2022 Women's NCAAs (Atlanta, GA); Individual Titles: 7 Relay Titles: 4 Total Titles: 11	Alex Walsh	400 Individual Medley	3:57.25
2022 Women's NCAAs (Atlanta, GA); Individual Titles: 7 Relay Titles: 4 Total Titles: 11	Kate Douglass	200 Freestyle Relay	1:24.96
2022 Women's NCAAs (Atlanta, GA); Individual Titles: 7 Relay Titles: 4 Total Titles: 11	Alex Walsh	200 Freestyle Relay	1:24.96
2022 Women's NCAAs (Atlanta, GA); Individual Titles: 7 Relay Titles: 4 Total Titles: 11	Lexi Cuomo	200 Freestyle Relay	1:24.96
2022 Women's NCAAs (Atlanta, GA); Individual Titles: 7 Relay Titles: 4 Total Titles: 11	Gretchen Walsh	200 Freestyle Relay	1:24.96
2022 Women's NCAAs (Atlanta, GA); Individual Titles: 7 Relay Titles: 4 Total Titles: 11	Kate Douglass	50 Freestyle	20.84
2022 Women's NCAAs (Atlanta, GA); Individual Titles: 7 Relay Titles: 4 Total Titles: 11	Alex Walsh	200 Individual Medley	1:50.08
2022 Women's NCAAs (Atlanta, GA); Individual Titles: 7 Relay Titles: 4 Total Titles: 11	Gretchen Walsh	200 Medley Relay	1:32.16
2022 Women's NCAAs (Atlanta, GA); Individual Titles: 7 Relay Titles: 4 Total Titles: 11	Alexis Wenger	200 Medley Relay	1:32.16
2022 Women's NCAAs (Atlanta, GA); Individual Titles: 7 Relay Titles: 4 Total Titles: 11	Lexi Cuomo	200 Medley Relay	1:32.16
2022 Women's NCAAs (Atlanta, GA); Individual Titles: 7 Relay Titles: 4 Total Titles: 11	Kate Douglass	200 Medley Relay	1:32.16
2021 Women's NCAAs (Greensboro, NC); Individual Titles: 5 Relay Titles: 1 Total Titles: 6	Paige Madden	1650 Freestyle	15:41.86
2021 Women's NCAAs (Greensboro, NC); Individual Titles: 5 Relay Titles: 1 Total Titles: 6	Paige Madden	200 Freestyle	1:42.35
2021 Women's NCAAs (Greensboro, NC); Individual Titles: 5 Relay Titles: 1 Total Titles: 6	Kate Douglass	50 Freestyle	21.13
2021 Women's NCAAs (Greensboro, NC); Individual Titles: 5 Relay Titles: 1 Total Titles: 6	Alex Walsh	200 Individual Medley	1:51.87
2021 Women's NCAAs (Greensboro, NC); Individual Titles: 5 Relay Titles: 1 Total Titles: 6	Paige Madden	500 Freestyle	4:33.61
2021 Women's NCAAs (Greensboro, NC); Individual Titles: 5 Relay Titles: 1 Total Titles: 6	Kyla Valls	800 Freestyle Relay	6:52.56
2021 Women's NCAAs (Greensboro, NC); Individual Titles: 5 Relay Titles: 1 Total Titles: 6	Paige Madden	800 Freestyle Relay	6:52.56
2021 Women's NCAAs (Greensboro, NC); Individual Titles: 5 Relay Titles: 1 Total Titles: 6	Ella Nelson	800 Freestyle Relay	6:52.56
2021 Women's NCAAs (Greensboro, NC); Individual Titles: 5 Relay Titles: 1 Total Titles: 6	Alex Walsh	800 Freestyle Relay	6:52.56
2016 Women's NCAAs (Atlanta, GA); Individual Titles: 2 Relay Titles: 0 Total Titles: 2	Leah Smith	1650 Freestyle	15.32.72
2016 Women's NCAAs (Atlanta, GA); Individual Titles: 2 Relay Titles: 0 Total Titles: 2	Leah Smith	500 Freestyle	4:31.33
2015 Women's NCAAs (Greensboro, NC); Individual Titles: 2 Relay Titles: 0 Total Titles: 2	Leah Smith	1650 Freestyle	15.34.46
2015 Women's NCAAs (Greensboro, NC); Individual Titles: 2 Relay Titles: 0 Total Titles: 2	Leah Smith	500 Freestyle	4:31.54
2011 Men's NCAAs (Minneapolis, MN); Individual Titles: 1 Relay Titles: 0 Total Titles: 1	Matt McLean	500 Freestyle	4:10.15
2001 Women's NCAAs (East Meadow, NY); Individual Titles: 1 Relay Titles: 0 Total Titles: 1	Cara Lane	1650 Freestyle	15:53.86
2000 Men's NCAAs (Minneapolis, MN); Individual Titles: 2 Relay Titles: 0 Total Titles: 2	Ed Moses	200m Breaststroke	2:06.40
2000 Men's NCAAs (Minneapolis, MN); Individual Titles: 2 Relay Titles: 0 Total Titles: 2	Ed Moses	100m Breaststroke	57.66
2000 Women's NCAAs (Indianapolis, IN); Individual Titles: 1 Relay Titles: 0 Total Titles: 1	Cara Lane	1500m Freestyle	16:03.59
1999 Men's NCAAs (Indianapolis, IN); Individual Titles: 1 Relay Titles: 0 Total Titles: 1	Shamek Pietucha	200 Butterfly	1:43.50

== Honors ==
=== NCAA Most Valuable Player ===
Women (5)

Men (1)

Year	Team	Name
2025	Women	Gretchen Walsh
2024	Women	Gretchen Walsh
2023	Women	Kate Douglass
2022	Women	Kate Douglass
2021	Women	Paige Madden
2000	Men	Ed Moses

=== CSCAA Coach of the Year ===
Women (5)

Year	Team	Name
2025	Women	Todd DeSorbo
2024	Women	Todd DeSorbo
2023	Women	Todd DeSorbo
2022	Women	Todd DeSorbo
2021	Women	Todd DeSorbo

=== ACC Swimmer of the Year ===
Women (17)

Men (15)

Name	Team	Year
Andy Wren	Men	1983
Brielle White	Women	2005, 2006
Cara Lane	Women	2000, 2001
David McCarty	Men	1988
Ed Moses	Men	2000, 2001
Fran Crippen	Men	2003, 2004
Greg Indrisano	Men	1992
Gretchen Walsh	Women	2024, 2025
Jack Jackson	Men	1989, 1990
Karen Burgess	Women	1991, 1993
Kate Douglass	Women	2022, 2023
Lauren Perdue	Women	2011
Luke Anderson	Men	2002
Matt McLean	Men	2008, 2011
Mei Christiensen	Women	2009, 2010
Melanie Valerio	Women	1990
Mirjana Bosevska	Women	2002
Paige Madden	Women	2020, 2021
Pat Mellors	Men	2007
Peter Wright	Men	1994
Rebecca Cronk	Women	1999
Vanja Rogulj	Men	2005

=== ACC Diver of the Year ===
Men (1)

Name	Team	Year
Derek Husmann	Men	1993

=== ACC Championships Most Valuable Swimmer ===
Women (17)

Men (15)

Name	Team	Year
Alex Walsh	Women	2022
Andy Wren	Men	1983
Austin Ramirez	Men	2000
Bill Smyth	Men	1994
Cara Lane	Women	2000, 2001
Danika Wizniuk	Women	1999
David McCarty	Men	1988
Doak Finch	Men	1998
Fran Crippen	Men	2004
Greg Indrisano	Men	1992
Gretchen Walsh	Women	2024, 2025
Ian Prichard	Men	2001
Jack Jackson	Men	1989
Karen Burgess	Women	1991, 1993
Kate Douglass	Women	2023
Lauren Perdue	Women	2010, 2011, 2013
Luke Anderson	Men	2002, 2005
Matt McLean	Men	2008, 2009, 2011
Mei Christiensen	Women	2009
Melanie Valerio	Women	1990
Mirjana Bosevska	Women	2002
Nicole Rutkowski	Women	1994
Paige Madden	Women	2020, 2021
Scot Robison	Men	2010

=== ACC Championships Most Valuable Diver ===
Women (2)

Name	Team	Year
Katie Caratelli	Women	1997, 1998
Laurie Wagner	Women	1996

=== ACC Freshman of the Year ===
Women (15)

Men (8)

Year	Team	Name
2025	Women	Anna Moesch
2023	Women	Aimee Canny
2022	Women	Gretchen Walsh
2021	Women	Alex Walsh
2020	Women	Kate Douglass
2015	Women	Jennifer Maarkand
2014	Women	Leah Smith
2013	Women	Courtney Bartholomew
2012	Women	Ellen Williamson
2010	Women	Lauren Perdue
2008	Men	Matt McLean
2008	Women	Liz Shaw
2005	Men	Pat Mellors
2004	Men	Vanya Rogulj
2004	Women	Kimi Kelly
2003	Men	Fran Crippen
2003	Women	Rachael Burke
2002	Men	Bo Greenwood
2001	Men	Luke Wagner
2000	Women	Mirjana Bosevska
1999	Men	Ed Moses
1999	Women	Danika Wizniuk
1997	Men	Doak Finch

=== ACC Coach of the Year ===
Name	Total	Men's	Women's
Todd DeSorbo	5		2020, 2021, 2022, 2023, 2024, 2025
Augie Busch	5	2014, 2015	2014, 2015, 2016
Mark Bernandino	31	1983, 1984, 1987, 1988, 1989, 1994, 1999, 2000, 2001, 2002, 2003, 2004, 2005, 2006, 2008, 2009, 2010, 2011	1983, 1984, 1986, 1990, 1994, 1996, 1998, 1999, 2003, 2008, 2009, 2010, 2011

== International & Olympic History ==
=== Olympic Games ===
Medal Count
Total (11)
5		3		3	
Men (3)			Women (8)		
2	1	0	3	2	3

Virginia's Olympians
Games	Athlete (Year of Graduation)	Nationality	Event(s)	Result
Paris 2024	Gretchen Walsh (‘25)	United states of America	100 meter butterfly 50 meter free 100 meter free 400 meter free relay 400 meter medley relay	
Tokyo 2020	Alex Walsh ('24)	United States of America	200m Individual Medley	2nd place, silver medalist(s)
Tokyo 2020	Kate Douglass ('23)	United States of America	200m Individual Medley	3rd place, bronze medalist(s)
Tokyo 2020	Paige Madden ('21)	United States of America	400m Freestyle; 4x200m Freestyle Relay	7th
Rio 2016	Leah Smith ('17)	United States of America	400m Freestyle; 800m Freestyle; 4x200m Freestyle Relay	6th
Rio 2016	Yannick Kaeser ('16)	Switzerland	100m Breaststroke; 200m Breaststroke	24th; 20th
London 2012	Lauren Perdue ('13)	United States of America	4 × 200 m Freestyle Relay	1st place, gold medalist(s)
London 2012	Katya Bachrouche ('11)	Lebanon	800m Freestyle	19th
London 2012	Matt McLean ('11)	United States of America	4x200 Freestyle Relay	1st place, gold medalist(s)
London 2012	David Karasek ('12)	Switzerland	200m Individual Medley	28th
London 2012	Yannick Kaeser ('16)	Switzerland	200m Breaststroke	24th
Beijing 2008	Erika Stewart ('12)	Colombia	200m Individual Medley	32nd
Beijing 2008	Vanja Rogulj ('07)	Croatia	100m Breaststroke; 4x100m Medley Relay	42nd; 12th
Athens 2004	Vanja Rogulj ('07)	Croatia	100m Breaststroke; 200m Breaststroke	26th; 37th
Sydney 2000	Mirjana Bosevska ('03)	Macedonia	800m Freestyle; 200m Butterfly; 400m Individual Medley	18th; 20th; 17th
Sydney 2000	Guy Yimsomruay ('03)	Thailand	200m Individual Medley	43rd
Sydney 2000	Vanja Rogulj ('07)	Croatia	100m Breaststroke; 4x100m Medley Relay	30th; 14th
Sydney 2000	Ed Moses ('00)	United States of America	100m Breaststroke; 4x100m Medley Relay	2nd place, silver medalist(s) 1st place, gold medalist(s)
Sydney 2000	Shamek Pietucha ('99)	Canada	100m Butterfly; 200m Butterfly; 4x100m Medley Relay	22nd; 18th; 6th
Atlanta 1996	Melanie Valerio ('91)	United States of America	4 × 100 m Freestyle Relay	1st place, gold medalist(s)
Atlanta 1996	Mirjana Bosevska ('03)	Macedonia	400m Freestyle; 800m Freestyle; 400m Individual Medley	22nd; 22nd; 23rd
Atlanta 1996	Peter Wright ('95)	United States of America	1500m Freestyle	12th
Montréal 1976	Wendy Weinberg ('78)	United States of America	800m Freestyle	3rd place, bronze medalist(s)

== See also ==
- NCAA Men's Swimming and Diving Championships
- NCAA Women's Swimming and Diving Championships
