= 2022 FINA World Swimming Championships (25 m) – Women's 1500 metre freestyle =

Swimming competition

Women's 1500 metre freestyle at the 2022 FINA World Swimming Championships (25 m)
- Venue: Melbourne Sports and Aquatic Centre
- Location: Melbourne, Australia
- Dates: 16 December
- Competitors: 17 from 15 nations
- Winning time: 15:21.43 CR

Medalists
gold medal	Lani Pallister	Australia
silver medal	Miyu Namba	Japan
bronze medal	Kensey McMahon	United States

The Women's 1500 metre freestyle competition of the 2022 FINA World Swimming Championships (25 m) was held on 16 December 2022.

== Records ==
Prior to the competition, the existing world and championship records were as follows.

World record	Katie Ledecky (USA)	15:08.24	Toronto, Canda	29 October 2022
Competition record				

The following new records were set during this competition:

Date	Event	Name	Nationality	Time	Record
17 December	Final	Lani Pallister	Australia	15:21.43	CR

== Results ==
The slowest heats were started at 12:55, and the fastest heat at 21:16.

Rank	Heat	Lane	Name	Nationality	Time	Notes
1st place, gold medalist(s)	3	4	Lani Pallister	Australia	15:21.43	OC, CR
2nd place, silver medalist(s)	3	8	Miyu Namba	Japan	15:46.76	AS
3rd place, bronze medalist(s)	2	5	Kensey McMahon	United States	15:49.15	
4	3	6	Zhang Ke	China	15:51.64	
5	3	1	Caitlin Deans	New Zealand	15:51.98	
6	3	3	Deniz Ertan	Turkey	15:53.73	
7	3	5	Merve Tuncel	Turkey	15:58.05	
8	2	6	Jillian Cox	United States	16:09.72	
9	2	4	Katja Fain	Slovenia	16:12.06	
10	2	3	Imani de Jong	Netherlands	16:15.61	
11	3	7	Alexa Reyna	France	16:23.32	
12	3	2	Gabrielle Roncatto	Brazil	16:33.31	
13	2	7	Stephanie Houtman	South Africa	16:35.55	
14	2	1	Klara Bošnjak	Croatia	16:51.02	
15	1	3	Ng Lai Wa	Hong Kong	17:01.32	
16	1	4	Kuo Jui-an	Chinese Taipei	17:16.69	
17	1	5	Gabriella Doueihy	Lebanon	17:20.28	
	2	2	Gan Ching Hwee	Singapore	Did not start	
