= 2022 NCAA Division I Women's Swimming and Diving Championships =

American collegiate aquatics championships

- Host city: (Georgia (U.S. state)) Atlanta, Georgia
- Date: March 16–19, 2022
- Venue(s): McAuley Aquatic Center; Georgia Institute of Technology
- Athletes: 322

The 2022 NCAA Division I Women's Swimming and Diving Championships were contested March 16–19, 2022 at the 40th annual NCAA-sanctioned swim meet to determine the team and individual national champions of Division I women's collegiate swimming and diving in the United States.

This year's events were hosted by the Georgia Institute of Technology at the McAuley Aquatic Center in Atlanta, Georgia. Lia Thomas, a transgender woman, won the 500 yd freestyle, becoming the first transgender athlete awarded an NCAA Division I title.

== Team standings ==
- Note: Top 10 only
- (H) = Hosts
- ^{(DC)} = Defending champions
- Full results

Rank	Team	Points
1st place, gold medalist(s)	Virginia ^{(DC)}	551.5
2nd place, silver medalist(s)	Texas	406
3rd place, bronze medalist(s)	Stanford	399.5
4	Alabama	288
5	NC State	279
6	Louisville	196.5
7	Michigan	184.5
8	California	180
9	Ohio State	165
10	Tennessee	127

== Swimming results ==
Event	Gold		Silver		Bronze	
50 freestyle	Kate Douglass; Virginia	20.84; US, AR	Gretchen Walsh; Virginia	20.95	Maggie Mac Neil; Michigan	21.38
100 freestyle	Gretchen Walsh; Virginia	46.05	Morgan Scott; Alabama	46.78	Katharine Berkoff; NC State	46.95
200 freestyle	Taylor Ruck; Stanford	1:41.12	Isabel Ivey; California	1:41.59	Kelly Pash; Texas	1:42.38
500 freestyle	Lia Thomas; Penn	4:33.24	Emma Weyant; Virginia	4:34.99	Erica Sullivan; Texas	4:35.92
1650 freestyle	Paige McKenna; Wisconsin	15:40.84	Erica Sullivan; Texas	15:45.94	Kensey McMahon; Alabama	15:47.60
100 backstroke	Katharine Berkoff; NC State	48.74; US, AR	Gretchen Walsh; Virginia	49.00	Regan Smith; Stanford	49.96
200 backstroke	Regan Smith; Stanford	1:47.76	Phoebe Bacon; Wisconsin	1:49.29	Rhyan White; Alabama	1:49.36
100 breaststroke	Kaitlyn Dobler; USC	56.93	Alexis Wenger; Virginia	56.97	Sophie Hansson; NC State	57.01
200 breaststroke	Kate Douglass; Virginia	2:02.19; US, AR	Anna Elendt; Texas	2:04.31	Sophie Hansson; NC State	2:04.76
100 butterfly	Kate Douglass; Virginia	49.04; AR	Torri Huske; Stanford	49.17	Maggie Mac Neil; Michigan	49.18
200 butterfly	Alex Walsh; Virginia	1:50.79	Regan Smith; Stanford Olivia Carter; Michigan	1:51.19	None awarded	
200 IM	Alex Walsh; Virginia	1:50.08; US, AR	Torri Huske; Stanford	1:51.81	Isabel Ivey; California	1:53.02
400 IM	Alex Walsh; Virginia	3:57.25	Brooke Forde; Stanford	4:00.41	Ella Nelson; Virginia	4:02.45
200 freestyle relay	Virginia; Kate Douglass (21.06); Alex Walsh (21.46); Lexi Cuomo (21.86); Gretchen Walsh (20.58)	1:24.96	Alabama; Kalia Antoniou (21.64); Morgan Scott (21.28); Kailyn Winter (21.42); Cora Dupre (21.13)	1:25.47	NC State; Katharine Berkoff (21.58); Kylee Alons (21.49); Sophie Hansson (22.05); Abby Arens (21.25)	1:26.37
400 freestyle relay	Virginia; Kate Douglass (46.62); Alex Walsh (46.49); Reilly Tiltmann (47.79); Gretchen Walsh (46.01)	3:06.91; US, AR	Stanford; Torri Huske (46.82); Lillie Nordmann (47.71); Regan Smith (47.74); Taylor Ruck (46.70)	3:08.97	Alabama; Diana Petkova (48.35); Morgan Scott (46.73); Kalia Antoniou (47.49); Cora Dupre (46.50)	3:09.07
800 freestyle relay	Stanford; Torri Huske (1:41.93); Taylor Ruck (1:40.49); Regan Smith (1:43.35); Brooke Forde (1:42.53)	6:48.30	Virginia; Reilly Tiltmann (1:43.17); Alex Walsh (1:41.92); Ella Nelson (1:43.58); Emma Weyant (1:44.80)	6:53.47	California; Isabel Ivey (1:41.35); Ayla Spitz (1:44.37); Mia Motekaitis (1:44.59); Leah Polonsky (1:43.21)	6:53.52
200 medley relay	Virginia; Gretchen Walsh (22.81); Alexis Wenger (26.08); Lexi Cuomo (22.72); Kate Douglass (20.55)	1:32.16; MR	NC State; Katharine Berkoff (22.76); Sophie Hansson (26.05); Abby Arens (22.93); Kylee Alons (21.22)	1:32.96	Ohio State; Emily Crane (23.89); Hannah Bach (25.78); Katherine Zenick (22.51); Amy Fulmer (20.98)	1:33.16
400 medley relay	Virginia; Gretchen Walsh (49.44); Alexis Wenger (57.27); Alex Walsh (49.45); Kate Douglass (46.18)	3:22.34; US, AR	NC State; Katharine Berkoff (49.25); Sophie Hansson (56.67); Kylee Alons (50.28); Abby Arens (47.09)	3:23.29	Stanford; Regan Smith (49.81); Allie Raab (59.15); Torri Huske (50.01); Taylor Ruck (46.66)	3:25.63

Legend: US – U.S. Open record; MR – Meet record; AR – American record;

== Diving results ==
Event	Gold		Silver		Bronze	
1 m diving	Mia Vallée; Miami (Florida)	365.75; MR	Sarah Bacon; Minnesota	356.60	Aranza Vázquez; North Carolina	354.75
3 m diving	Sarah Bacon; Minnesota	409.25	Kristen Hayden; Indiana	397.20	Tarrin Gilliland; Indiana	382.00
Platform diving	Tarrin Gilliland; Indiana	372.95	Delaney Schnell; Arizona	345.10	Jordan Skilken; Texas	315.45

Legend: MR – Meet record;

== See also ==
- List of college swimming and diving teams
