= Pat Forde =

American journalist

Pat Forde is an American sports journalist who is a national columnist for Sports Illustrated. He previously worked for ESPN, The Courier-Journal in Louisville, Kentucky, and Yahoo Sports.

== Personal life and education ==
Forde is a native of Colorado Springs, Colorado. He currently lives in Louisville with his wife Tricia, a former swimmer at Northwestern University. All three of their children were college swimmers—son Mitchell at Missouri from 2013 to 2017, another son Clayton at Georgia from 2016 to 2020, and daughter Brooke at Stanford from 2017 to 2022. Brooke was a silver medalist in the Tokyo Olympics in 2021 as part of the USA 4 × 200m freestyle relay team.

Forde played high school football for Gary Barnett during his sophomore and junior years (1980–81) at Air Academy High School in Colorado Springs. He is a 1987 graduate of the University of Missouri in Columbia, Missouri.

== Career ==
=== The Courier-Journal ===
Forde began his career in 1987 working as a journalist for The Courier-Journal in Louisville, where his writing won numerous awards. He initially worked there as a beat reporter and then spent 12 years writing a column.

=== ESPN ===
In 2004, Forde left The Courier-Journal to join ESPN full-time after freelancing for their website for about seven years. During the NCAA football season, Forde wrote a column called "Forde Yard Dash", and during the NCAA basketball season, he wrote a column called "Forde Minutes". He also appeared on ESPN radio and television.

=== Yahoo! Sports ===
On November 1, 2011, after the expiration of his contract, Forde left ESPN to pursue a career with Yahoo Sports. There, he resumed his weekly "Forde Yard Dash" and, later, his "Forde Minutes" column as well.

=== Sports Illustrated ===
On October 29, 2019, Forde joined Sports Illustrated as its new senior college sports writer. He continues to write both "Forde-Yard Dash" and "Forde Minutes" for SI.

==== Feud with Auburn ====
Forde has a nationally known feud with Auburn University, specifically with the university's men's basketball coach Bruce Pearl. Forde's excessive criticism of Pearl has led many fans and Sports Illustrated readers to assume that Forde has an unhealthy dislike for Pearl. Such articles have caused a plethora of Auburn fans, specifically those that are X users, to retaliate to Forde's writings with an assorted bombardment of memes.

=== Book on Rick Pitino ===
In 2008, Forde served as the co-author for University of Louisville basketball coach Rick Pitino's Rebound Rules: The Art of Success 2.0.
