= Anna Peplowski =

American swimmer (born 2002)

Personal information
- Born: September 25, 2002 (age 23) Germantown Hills, Illinois, U.S.

Sport
- Country: United States
- Sport: Swimming
- Strokes: Freestyle, backstroke
- Club: Indiana Swim Club
- College team: Indiana University
Medal record
Women's swimming
Representing the United States
Olympic Games
Silver medal – second place	2024 Paris	4×200 m freestyle
World Championships (LC)
Silver medal – second place	2023 Fukuoka	4×200 m freestyle
Silver medal – second place	2025 Singapore	4×200 m freestyle
Pan Pacific Championships
Silver medal – second place	2026 Irvine	4×200 m freestyle

Anna Peplowski (born September 25, 2002) is an American competitive swimmer.

== Early life ==
Peplowski attended Metamora Township High School in Metamora, Illinois northeast of Peoria, Illinois. She attends Indiana University and started swimming for the Indiana Hoosiers during her freshman season in 2021–22. Her older sister Noelle also swam for the Hoosiers.

== Career ==
=== 2022 ===
At the 2022 U.S. Championships in Irvine, California in July, Peplowski competed in the 200m freestyle, 100 m backstroke, and 200m backstroke. She finished seventh in all three events.

=== 2023 ===
Peplowski competed at the 2023 U.S. Championships in Indianapolis held in June and July. She finished seventh in the 200m freestyle. Later in July, Peplowski competed at the 2023 World Championships in Doha, Qatar. She swam in the heats of the 4 × 200 m freestyle relay, and the U.S. finished second in the final, earning her a silver medal.

=== 2024 ===
At the 2024 NCAA Championships in Athens, Georgia in March, Peplowski won the silver medal in the 200 yards freestyle and the bronze medal in the 500 yards freestyle. She competed at the 2024 U.S. Olympic Trials in June. She finished fifth in the 200m freestyle and sixth in the 400m freestyle.

=== 2025 ===
At the 2025 NCAA championships Peplowksi won the women's 200 yard freestyle in a 1:40.50. At the US nationals later in June, she tied for fourth in the 200 meter free style with Erin Gemmell with a 1:55.82, qualifying to the world championships. Gemmell and Peplowski later had a swim off to determine who would swim the 200 free individually, with Gemmell winning. At the 2025 World Championships in Singapore, Anna swam prelims of the 4x200 meter freestyle relay splitting a 1:55.16, the fastest split of prelims. She swam the final of this relay as well and split a huge 1:54.75 on the second leg. Together with Claire Weinstein, Erin Gemmell, and Katie Ledecky, they won silver behind Australia. They broke the previous American record set the 2020 Summer Olympics.
