= Brooke Forde =

American swimmer

Personal information
- Born: March 4, 1999 (age 27) Louisville, Kentucky, U.S.
- Height: 5 ft 9 in (175 cm)

Sport
- Sport: Swimming
- Strokes: freestyle, individual medley
- Club: Stanford
- Coach: Greg Meehan
Medal record
Women's swimming
Representing the United States
Olympic Games
Silver medal – second place	2020 Tokyo	4×200 m freestyle
Junior Pan Pacific Championships
Gold medal – first place	2016 Maui	4×200 m freestyle
Silver medal – second place	2016 Maui	400 m medley

Brooke Forde (born March 4, 1999) is an American swimmer.

The daughter of sportswriter Pat Forde and his wife Tricia, the latter a former swimmer at Stanford University, she grew up around the sport, with both of her older brothers going on to swim in NCAA Division I. She swam for Lakeside Swim Club in Louisville, Kentucky. According to a 2021 story by local Louisville journalist Rick Bozich, "As her parents remember it, Brooke had one swimming lesson. She learned by sitting with her mom at practice and then mimicking her brothers." She set her first Kentucky state record as an 8-year-old, and a year later recorded that year's best age-group time in the U.S. in the girls' 50m butterfly. At Louisville's Sacred Heart Academy, she went on to win multiple state championships, make multiple U.S. international teams, and be named national high school girls' swimmer of the year.

Forde received multiple NCAA Division I offers, ultimately choosing Stanford University, where she had been hosted on her recruiting visit by multiple Olympic gold medalist Katie Ledecky. While at Stanford, she was on two NCAA championship teams and won four NCAA individual titles, and was also named the Pac-12 Conference scholar-athlete of the year in women's swimming & diving in 2021. Forde graduated from Stanford in 2021 with a degree in human biology. Due to COVID-19, the NCAA granted all student-athletes in the organization's winter sports, including swimming & diving, an extra year of eligibility; Forde remained at Stanford in 2021–22, continuing to swim for the Cardinal while pursuing a master's degree in epidemiology.

At the 2020 United States Olympic Trials Forde finished sixth in the 200m freestyle, qualifying her for the relay team at the 2020 Olympics after the results of the women's 50m freestyle opened a spot for her. She earned a silver medal for swimming on the preliminary 4x200-meter freestyle relay team.

She won the 400m individual medley at the 2021 NCAA Division I Women's Swimming and Diving Championships, her fourth overall title. She finished fourth in the Women's 500 yard freestyle at the 2022 NCAA Division I Women's Swimming and Diving Championships.

== Personal ==
Forde's father, Pat Forde, detailed her "long, laborious path to the Olympics" for Sports Illustrated, where he is a writer.
