= Kaitlyn Dobler =

American swimmer

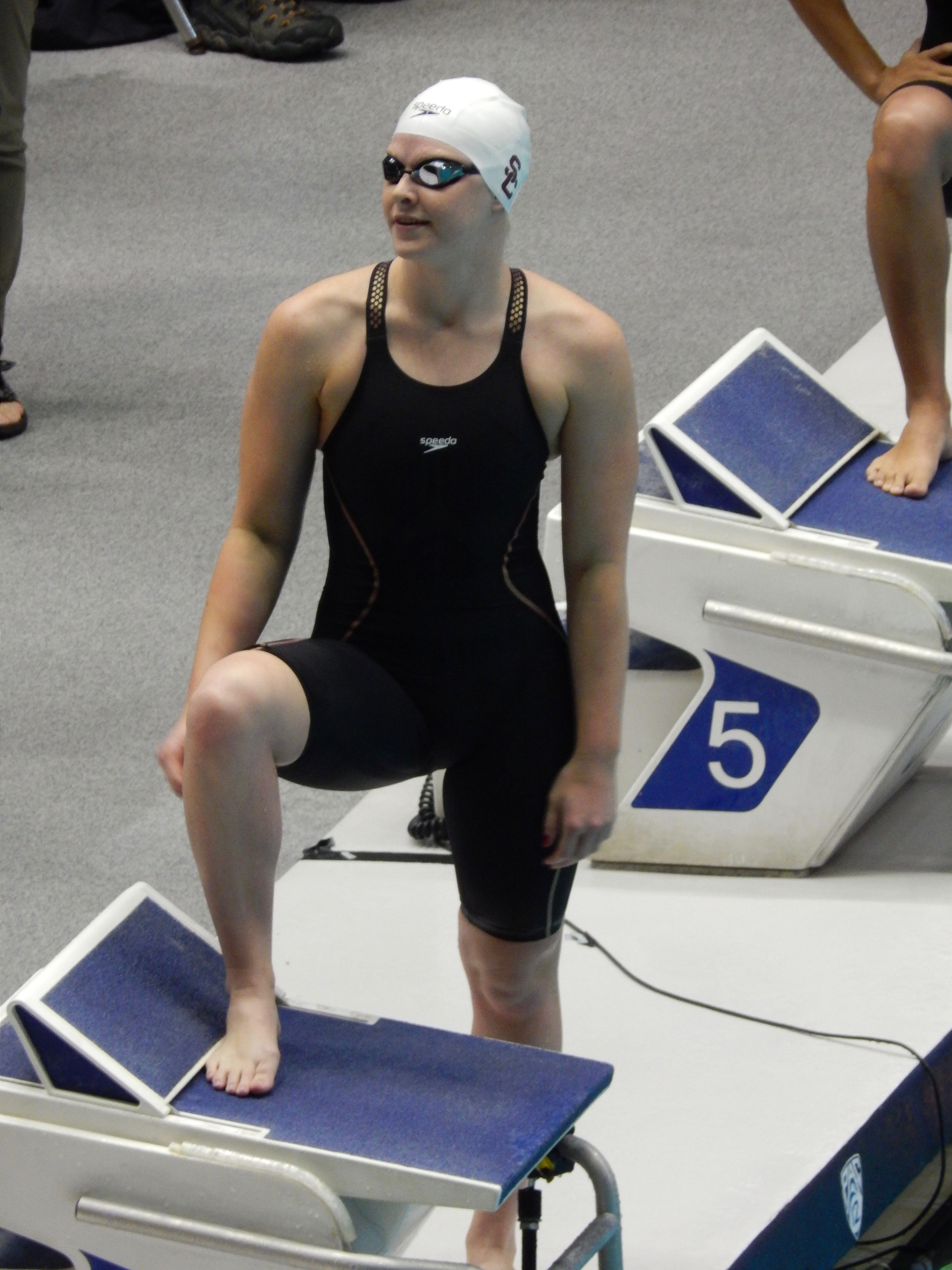
- Dobler in 2023

Personal information
- National team: United States
- Born: February 15, 2002 (age 24) Portland, Oregon, United States
- Height: 5 ft 7 in (170 cm)

Sport
- Sport: Swimming
- Strokes: Breaststroke
- Club: Portland Dolphins
- College team: University of Southern California
Medal record
Women's swimming
| Event | 1st | 2nd | 3rd |
|---|---|---|---|
| World Junior Championships | 1 | 1 | 1 |
| Total | 1 | 1 | 1 |
Representing United States
World Junior Championships
| Gold medal – first place | 2019 Budapest | 4×100 m medley |
| Silver medal – second place | 2019 Budapest | 100 m breaststroke |
| Bronze medal – third place | 2019 Budapest | 50 m breaststroke |
Representing the USC Trojans
| Event | 1st | 2nd | 3rd |
|---|---|---|---|
| NCAA Championships | 1 | 1 | 0 |
| Total | 1 | 1 | 0 |
By race
| Event | 1st | 2nd | 3rd |
|---|---|---|---|
| 100 y breaststroke | 1 | 1 | 0 |
| Total | 1 | 1 | 0 |
NCAA Championships
| Gold medal – first place | 2022 Atlanta | 100 y breaststroke |
| Silver medal – second place | 2021 Greensboro | 100 y breaststroke |

Kaitlyn Dobler (born February 15, 2002) is an American competitive swimmer. She is the 2022 NCAA Division I champion in the 100-yard breaststroke. She won the national title in the 100-meter breaststroke at the 2022 US National Championships. At the 2019 World Junior Championships, she won the silver medal in the 100-meter breaststroke and the bronze medal in the 50-meter breaststroke, in addition to winning a gold medal in the 4×100-meter medley relay, swimming the breaststroke leg of the relay in the final.

== Background ==
Dobler was born February 15, 2002, in Portland, Oregon to Neil Dobler, an engineer at Intel, and Rebecca "Becky", a professor at George Fox University. She is the oldest of two siblings, her sister three years her junior. She graduated from Aloha High School in Aloha, Oregon, in 2020, where she competed as part of the school swim team. She started attending the University of Southern California and competing collegiately for the USC Trojans starting in the fall of 2020. In December 2022, she announced her intent to compete for the university through the end of her master's degree (through the 2024–2025 season), utilizing a fifth year of NCAA eligibility made available to NCAA student-athletes during the COVID-19 pandemic. Her ability to compete in swimming has on occasion been impacted by her asthma, including at the 2021 NCAA Division I Championships in the 200-yard breaststroke.

== Career ==
=== 2019 World Junior Championships ===
2019 World Junior Championships
| Gold medal – first place | 4×100 m medley | 3:59.13 |
| Silver medal – second place | 100 m breaststroke | 1:06.97 |
| Bronze medal – third place | 50 m breaststroke | 30.92 |

On the second day of competition at the 2019 FINA World Junior Swimming Championships, held at Danube Arena in Budapest, Hungary in August, Dobler won a bronze medal in the 50-meter breaststroke with a time of 30.92 seconds, finishing less than three-tenths of a second behind gold medalist Benedetta Pilato of Italy and just one-hundredth of a second behind silver medalist Kayla van der Merwe of Great Britain. Two days later, she won the silver medal in the 100-meter breaststroke with a time of 1:06.97, swimming just four-hundredths of a second slower than the gold medalist Evgeniia Chikunova of Russia. The sixth and final day of competition, she won a gold medal in the 4×100-meter medley relay, splitting a 1:07.51 for the breaststroke leg of the relay in the final to help finish first in 3:59.13 alongside finals relay teammates Claire Curzan (backstroke), Torri Huske (butterfly), and Gretchen Walsh (freestyle).

=== 2020–2022: National records, NCAA title, national title ===
In February 2020, Dobler swam the fastest 100-yard breaststroke by a woman in the history of high school swimming in the United States, setting a new national high school record in the event at the 2020 Oregon 6A State Championships with her time of 58.35 seconds. Her record marked the first time in approximately 30 years that an Oregonian set a national record. In December, she won the 100-meter breaststroke at the 2020 U.S. Open Swimming Championships held in Irvine, California, and placed sixth overall, with a time of 1:08.77. Two months later, she set a new National Age Group record in the 100-yard breaststroke for the girls 17–18 years old age group, with a time of 57.71 seconds in a collegiate dual meet against the UCLA Bruins that lowered the national mark by over three-tenths of a second from the former record of 58.10 seconds by Rebecca Soni from 2009.

At the 2021 NCAA Division I Championships in Greensboro, North Carolina, Dobler placed 11th overall, third in the consolation final, in the 50-yard freestyle with a personal best time of 21.92 seconds. The following day, she made the podium in her first ever event at an NCAA Division I Championships, winning the silver medal in the 100-yard breaststroke with a time of 57.46 seconds, which was just 0.23 seconds slower than the winning time of 57.23 seconds swum by Sophie Hansson.

2022 NCAA Championships
| Gold medal – first place | 100 yd breaststroke | 56.93 |

For the NCAA Championships her sophomore, second, year with the USC Trojans, the 2022 NCAA Division I Championships in Atlanta, Georgia, in March, Dobler won her first NCAA title in the 100-yard breaststroke with a Pac-12 Conference record and USC Trojans record time of 56.93 seconds. She was the first woman from the USC Trojans's swim program to win an NCAA title in the 100-yard breaststroke since 2009, when Rebecca Soni won the NCAA title in the event. The time of 56.93 seconds also ranked Dobler as the sixth-fastest performer in the event in NCAA history, behind Lilly King, Molly Hannis, Sophie Hansson, Alexis Wenger, and Anna Elendt.

The following month, at the 2022 USA Swimming International Team Trials in Greensboro, North Carolina, Dobler placed second in the 50-meter breaststroke with a personal best time of 30.34 seconds, finishing just one-hundredth of a second ahead of third-place finisher Lydia Jacoby. For the 100-meter breaststroke, she placed third with a personal best time of 1:06.19. Her top-two finish and FINA "A" cut time of 30.34 seconds in the 50-meter breaststroke were deemed not satisfactory in qualifying for the 2022 World Aquatics Championships by USA Swimming, instead selecting the second-place finisher in the 100-meter breaststroke, who did not compete in the 50-meter breaststroke event at the Team Trials, for the second roster spot in the 50-meter breaststroke. A little over two months later, she was named to the 2022 Duel in the Pool roster for the United States. Ten days later, she won the gold medal and national title in the 100-meter breaststroke, with a time of 1:06.88, at the 2022 US National Championships, held in Irvine, California.

At the 2022 SMU Classic in October in Dallas, Texas, Dobler won the 100-yard breaststroke for the USC Trojans with a pool record time of 59.09 seconds. The following month, she achieved a season best time (for the 2022–2023 NCAA season) of 56.94 seconds and first-place finish in the 100-yard breaststroke at the 2022 Art Adamson Invitational.

=== 2023 ===
In a dual meet against the UCLA Bruins on February 10, 2023, Dobler won the 100-yard breaststroke with a time of 58.04 seconds and placed second in the 200-yard breaststroke with a time of 2:09.58.

==== 2023 Pac-12 Championships ====
Twelve days later, on day one of the 2023 Pac-12 Conference Championships, held at the King County Aquatic Center in Federal Way, Washington, Dobler contributed to a final time of 1:35.63 and placing of third in the 4×50-yard medley relay, splitting a 26.34 for the breaststroke leg of the relay. For the finals session on the second day, she placed sixth in the b-final of the 50-yard freestyle with a 22.60 and contributed a 22.24 for the second leg of the 4×50-yard freestyle relay to help win the bronze medal in 1:28.19. Out fast in the morning preliminaries of the 100-yard breaststroke on day three with a time of 57.78 seconds and overall first-rank by 1.97 seconds, she finished in 57.10 seconds in the evening final, winning the gold medal and conference title and setting a new Championships record. Later in the session, her relay team was one of three teams disqualified in the 4×100-yard medley relay. Her 100-yard breaststroke gold medal marked the third year in a row she won the conference title in the event. Wrapping up competition on the fourth and final day, she won the conference title in the second breaststroke event, the 200-yard breaststroke, with a personal best time of 2:05.66 and a bronze medal in the 4×100-yard freestyle relay with a final time of 3:14.12. Her results contributed to a final team score of 1267.5 points for the USC Trojans and an overall team placing of second, behind first-place Stanford Cardinal and ahead of third-place California Golden Bears.

==== 2023 NCAA Championships ====
At the 2023 NCAA Division I Championships, held in March in Knoxville, Tennessee, Dobler split a 26.15 for the breaststroke leg of the 4×50-yard medley relay on day one, helping place tenth in 1:35.52. On the second day, she tied Olivia Nel for forty-third in the 50-yard freestyle with a 22.48 and placed twelfth in the 4×50-yard freestyle relay, anchoring the relay to a final time of 1:27.91 with a 22.09. The third day, she finished fourth in the final of the 100-yard breaststroke in a time of 57.50 seconds, which was 0.47 seconds behind first-place finisher Lydia Jacoby, and tenth in the 4×100-yard medley relay, where she and her relay teammates timed in at 3:29.56. For her final individual event, the 200-yard breaststroke on the fourth and final day, she placed fifteenth overall with a 2:09.14.

== International championships ==
| Meet | 50 breaststroke | 100 breaststroke | 4×100 medley |
|---|---|---|---|
| WJC 2019 (age: 17) | (bronze) (30.92) | (silver) (1:06.97) | (gold) (split 1:07.51, br leg) |

== Personal best times ==
=== Long course meters (50-m pool) ===
| Event | Time | Meet | Location | Date | Ref |
|---|---|---|---|---|---|
| 50 m breaststroke | 30.34 | 2022 USA Swimming International Team Trials | Greensboro, North Carolina | April 28, 2022 | |
| 100 m breaststroke | 1:06.19 | 2022 USA Swimming International Team Trials | Greensboro, North Carolina | April 29, 2022 | |
| 200 m breaststroke | 2:30.09 | 2023 TYR Pro Swim Series – Westmont | Westmont, Illinois | April 14, 2023 | |

=== Short course yards (25-yd pool) ===
| Event | Time | | Meet | Location | Date | Ref |
|---|---|---|---|---|---|---|
| 50 yd freestyle | 21.92 | b | 2021 NCAA Division I Championships | Greensboro, North Carolina | March 18, 2021 | |
| 100 yd breaststroke | 56.93 | | 2022 NCAA Division I Championships | Atlanta, Georgia | March 18, 2022 | |
| 200 yd breaststroke | 2:05.66 | | 2023 Pac-12 Conference Championships | Federal Way, Washington | February 25, 2023 | |

Legend: b – b-final

== Records ==
=== National age group records (short course yards) ===
| No. | Event | Time | Meet | Location | Date | Age | Age Group | Ref |
|---|---|---|---|---|---|---|---|---|
| 1 | 100 yd breaststroke | 57.71 | USC Trojans v. UCLA Bruins Dual Meet | Los Angeles, California | February 12, 2021 | 18 years, 363 days | 17–18 | |

=== National high school records (short course yards) ===
| No. | Event | Time | Meet | Location | Date | Type | Ref |
|---|---|---|---|---|---|---|---|
| 1 | 100 yd breaststroke | 58.35 | Oregon School Activities Association 6A State Swimming Championships | Beaverton, Oregon | February 22, 2020 | Overall, Public | |

Legend: Overall – National High School record; Public – National Public High School record

== Awards and honors ==
- Oregon Sports Awards, Prep Girls Swimmer of the Year: 2018, 2019, 2020
