= Aranza Vázquez =

Mexican diver (born 2002)

Personal information
- Full name: Aranza Vázquez Montaño
- Born: 21 August 2002 (age 23) La Paz, Mexico
- Height: 1.68 m (5 ft 6 in)

Sport
- Country: Mexico
- Sport: Diving
- Events: 1 m, 3 m, 3 m synchro, 10m platform
- College team: North Carolina
- Coached by: Yaidel Gamboa
Medal record
World Championships
Silver medal – second place	2023 Fukuoka	Team
Silver medal – second place	2024 Doha	Team event
Bronze medal – third place	2023 Fukuoka	1 m springboard

Aranza Vázquez Montaño (Note: In this Spanish name, the first or paternal surname is Vázquez and the second or maternal family name is Montano.) (born 21 August 2002) is a Mexican diver. She represented Mexico at the 2020 Summer Olympics in the individual 3-metre springboard.

== College career ==
Vázquez attends the University of North Carolina, majoring in Exercise Science. She is the two-time ACC champion in the 10-metre platform and 3-metre springboard and was named the 2021 ACC Women's Diver of the Year. In the 2021 NCAA Championships, she placed second in the 1-metre and 3-metre springboard and sixth on the 10-metre platform. In the 2022 NCAA Championships, she placed third on the 1-metre platform.

In the 2023 NCAA Championships, Vázquez won both the 1-metre and the 3-metre events, becoming the first North Carolina diver to win a national title.

== International career ==
Vázquez began her international career with the 2017 FINA Diving Grand Prix, before participating in the 1-metre springboard event at the 2019 World Aquatics Championships in Gwangju, South Korea. She placed fourth at the 2021 FINA Diving World Cup, qualifying for her first Olympic Games. At the 2020 Summer Olympics, she placed sixth in the 3 metre springboard event.

== Personal life ==
Vázquez has a younger brother, Rodolfo, who also dives for the North Carolina Tar Heels.
