= Wenbo Chen =

American diving coach

Wenbo Chen is an American diving coach. He started his career in the United States at Moss Farms Diving in Moultrie, GA in 1994. When Jay Lerew left in 1996, Chen became the head diving coach and continued to develop the diving program until 2001. Chen left to lead the Purdue University Diving Team until 2005 when he was recruited to lead as the head coach of USA Diving. During this time with USA Diving, Chen led his divers to the 2008 Beijing Olympics. In 2009, Chen was hired on by the University of Minnesota Diving Team. In 2012, Chen coached Kelci Bryant to win the silver medal at the London Olympics in 3-M Women's Synchro. Chen has been described by the University of Minnesota as one of the "most respected and accomplished coaches in the world".
