= 2023 NCAA Division I Women's Swimming and Diving Championships =

American college aquatic sports competition

- Host city: Knoxville, Tennessee
- Date: March 15–18, 2023
- Venue(s): Allan Jones Aquatic Center; University of Tennessee
- Athletes: 322

The 2023 NCAA Division I Women's Swimming and Diving Championships were contested March 15–18, 2023 at the 41st annual NCAA-sanctioned swim meet to determine the team and individual national champions of Division I women's collegiate swimming and diving in the United States.

The meet was hosted by the University of Tennessee at the Allan Jones Aquatic Center in Knoxville, Tennessee. Led by senior Kate Douglass, junior Alex Walsh, and sophomore Gretchen Walsh, the University of Virginia won their third consecutive national championship.

== Team standings ==
- Note: Top 10 only
- (H) = Hosts
- ^{(DC)} = Defending champions

Rank	Team	Points
1st place, gold medalist(s)	Virginia ^{(DC)}	541.5
2nd place, silver medalist(s)	Texas	414.5
3rd place, bronze medalist(s)	Stanford	333
4	Louisville	288
5	NC State	263
6	Ohio State	223
7	Indiana	219
8	Tennessee (H)	214
8	Florida	179
10	North Carolina	152

== Swimming results ==
Full results:

Event	Gold		Silver		Bronze	
50 freestyle	Maggie Mac Neil; LSU	20.79; US	Gretchen Walsh; Virginia	20.85	Gabi Albiero; Louisville	21.30
100 freestyle	Gretchen Walsh; Virginia	45.61	Torri Huske; Stanford	46.46	Maggie Mac Neil; LSU	46.58
200 freestyle	Taylor Ruck; Stanford	1:42.36	Brooklyn Douthwright; Tennessee	1:42.41	Aimee Canny; Virginia	1:42.50
500 freestyle	Kensey McMahon; Alabama	4:36.62	Abby Carlson; Wisconsin	4:36.96	Olivia Bray; Texas	4:37.02
1650 freestyle	Kensey McMahon; Alabama	15:43.84	Gan Ching Hwee; Indiana	15:46.28	Paige McKenna; Wisconsin	15:48.71
100 backstroke	Gretchen Walsh; Virginia	48.26; US, AR	Katharine Berkoff; NC State	49.13	Claire Curzan; Stanford	50.08
200 backstroke	Claire Curzan; Stanford	1:47.64	Phoebe Bacon; Wisconsin	1:49.28	Isabelle Stadden; California	1:49.38
100 breaststroke	Lydia Jacoby; Texas	57.03	Mona McSharry; Tennessee	57.16	Anna Elendt; Texas	57.26
200 breaststroke	Kate Douglass; Virginia	2:01.29; US, AR	Anna Elendt; Texas	2:03.26	Ella Nelson; Virginia	2:04.33
100 butterfly	Kate Douglass; Virginia	48.46; US, AR	Maggie Mac Neil; LSU	48.51	Torri Huske; Stanford	48.96
200 butterfly	Emma Sticklen; Texas	1:49.95; MR	Alex Walsh; Virginia	1:50.23	Kelly Pash; Texas	1:51.89
200 IM	Kate Douglass; Virginia	1:48.37; US, AR	Torri Huske; Stanford	1:50.06	Alex Walsh; Virginia	1:50.07
400 IM	Alex Walsh; Virginia	3:57.24	Ella Nelson; Virginia	3:59.54	Emma Weyant; Florida	4:03.50
200 freestyle relay	Virginia; Kate Douglass (21.01); Gretchen Walsh (20.59); Lexi Cuomo (21.33); Maxine Parker (21.58)	1:24.51; MR	Stanford; Torri Huske (21.57); Claire Curzan (20.98); Taylor Ruck (21.39); Amy Tang (21.76)	1:25.70	Louisville; Gabi Albiero (21.62); Christiana Regenauer (21.23); Julia Dennis (21.39); Ella Welch (21.49)	1:25.73
400 freestyle relay	Virginia; Kate Douglass (46.37); Alex Walsh (46.58); Maxine Parker (47.04); Gretchen Walsh (45.85)	3:05.84; US, AR	Stanford; Torri Huske (46.59); Taylor Ruck (46.74); Amy Tang (48.36); Claire Curzan (46.85)	3:08.54	Louisville; Gabi Albiero (47.38); Christiana Regenauer (47.24); Julia Dennis (47.49); Ella Welch (47.46)	3:09.57
800 freestyle relay	Virginia; Aimee Canny (1:42.34); Alex Walsh (1:41.18); Reilly Tiltmann (1:43.38); Ella Nelson (1:42.92)	6:49.82	Stanford; Torri Huske (1:41.93); Taylor Ruck (1:42.23); Lillie Nordmann (1:44.04); Kayla Wilson (1:42.22)	6:50.77	Texas; Kelly Pash (1:43.08); Olivia Bray (1:43.26); Kyla Leibel (1:44.63); Erica Sullivan (1:44.58)	6:55.55
200 medley relay	Virginia; Gretchen Walsh (22.77); Alex Walsh (26.30); Lexi Cuomo (22.10); Kate Douglass (20.34)	1:31.51; US, AR	NC State; Katharine Berkoff (22.88); Heather MacCausland (25.69); Kylee Alons (22.59); Abby Arens (21.26)	1:32.96	Texas; Olivia Bray (23.72); Anna Elendt (25.54); Emma Sticklen (22.32); Grace Cooper (21.64)	1:33.22
400 medley relay	Virginia; Gretchen Walsh (49.39); Alex Walsh (56.79); Kate Douglass (48.94); Aimee Canny (47.27)	3:22.39	NC State; Katharine Berkoff (50.10); Heather MacCausland (57.39); Kylee Alons (49.96); Abby Arens (47.21)	3:24.66	Texas; Olivia Bray (50.89); Lydia Jacoby (56.78); Emma Sticklen (50.19); Kelly Pash (47.32)	3:25.18

Legend: US – U.S. Open record; MR – Meet record; AR – American record;

== Diving results ==
Event	Gold		Silver		Bronze	
1 m diving	Aranza Vázquez; North Carolina	358.75	Delaney Schnell; Arizona	340.05	Mia Vallée; Miami (Florida)	338.10
3 m diving	Aranza Vázquez; North Carolina	385.80	Anne Fowler; Indiana	369.90	Brooke Schultz; Arkansas	364.25
Platform diving	Delaney Schnell; Arizona	352.65	Montsserat Levenant; LSU	347.00	Viviana Del Angel; Minnesota	344.55

== See also ==
- List of college swimming and diving teams
