= 2021 BIG 10 Men's Swimming and Diving Championships =

Collegiate swimming and diving championships

2021 Big Ten Men's Swimming and Diving Championships
- Host city: Columbus, Ohio
- Date(s): March 2–6, 2021
- Venue(s): McCorkle Aquatic Pavilion

The 2021 Big Ten Men's Swimming and Diving Championships was held from March 2–6, 2021 at the McCorkle Aquatic Pavilion in Columbus, Ohio. It was the 112th annual Big Ten-sanctioned swimming and diving championship meet.

== Team standings ==
- Full results

Rank	Team	Points
1st place, gold medalist(s)	Michigan	1401
2nd place, silver medalist(s)	Indiana	1357
3rd place, bronze medalist(s)	Ohio State	1322
4	Purdue	732
5	Wisconsin	729
6	Northwestern	722
7	Penn State	620
8	Iowa	567
9	Minnesota	564
10	Michigan State	196

== Swimming results ==
Full results

Event	Gold		Silver		Bronze	
50 freestyle	Sem Andreis; Ohio State	19.05	Jack Franzman; Indiana	19.14	William Roberson; Penn State	19.17
100 freestyle	Sem Andreis; Ohio State	42.23	Nikola Aćin; Purdue	42.31	Hunter Armstrong; Ohio State	42.37
200 freestyle	Paul Delakis; Ohio State	1:32.28	Patrick Callan; Michigan	1:33.26	Tomer Frankel; Indiana	1:33.27
500 freestyle	Jake Mitchell; Michigan	4:12.92	Patrick Callan; Michigan	4:13.10	Josh Dannhauser; Wisconsin	4:16.50
1650 freestyle	Michael Brinegar; Indiana	14:38.26	Jake Mitchell; Michigan	14.42.60	Charlie Clark; Ohio State	14:45.24
100 backstroke	Gabriel Fantoni; Indiana	45.34	Hunter Armstrong; Ohio State	45.50	Jacob Steele; Indiana	45.81
200 backstroke	Brendan Burns; Indiana	1:39.37	Wyatt Davis; Michigan	1:40.68	Jacob Steele; Indiana	1:41.53
100 breaststroke	Max McHugh; Minnesota	50.59	Will Chan; Michigan	50.95	Zane Backes; Indiana	51.04
200 breaststroke	Max McHugh; Minnesota	1:50.93	Paul Delakis; Ohio State	1:51.78	Zane Backes; Indiana	1:53.18
100 butterfly	Tomer Frankel; Indiana	44.91	Brendan Burns; Indiana	45.26	Wes Jekel; Wisconsin	45.96
200 butterfly	Brendan Burns; Indiana	1:39.22	Corey Gambardella; Indiana	1:42.53	Connor LaMastra; Northwestern	1:42.68
200 IM	Paul Delakis; Ohio State	1:41.71	Van Mathias; Indiana	1:43.61	Wes Jekel; Wisconsin	1:43.78
400 IM	Michael Daly; Penn State	3:41.09	Daniel Berlitz; Michigan	3:41.45	Jared Daigle; Michigan	3:43.24
200 freestyle relay	Indiana; Tomer Frankel (19.42); Jack Franzman (18.59); Brandon Hamblin (19.23); Van Mathias (19.00)	1:16.24	Purdue; Nikola Aćin (19.38); Ryan Hrosik (19.07); Nicholas Sherman (18.98); Ryan Lawrence (19.07)	1:16.50	Ohio State; Hunter Armstrong (19.17); Sem Andreis (18.65); Colin McDermott (19.37); Justin Fleagle (19.38)	1:16.57
400 freestyle relay	Indiana; Tomer Frankel (42.68); Van Mathias (41.76); Brendan Burns (42.60); Jack Franzman (42.16)	2:49.20	Ohio State; Hunter Armstrong (42.47); Sem Andreis (41.66); Justin Fleagle (43.21); Paul Delakis (41.98)	2:49.32	Michigan; River Wright (42.06); Bence Szabados (42.87); Cameron Peel (42.47); Gustavo Borges (42.26)	2:49.66
800 freestyle relay	Michigan; Patrick Callan (1:32.67); Jake Mitchell (1:32.95); Daniel Berlitz (1:33.71); Wyatt Davis (1:33.67)	6:13.00	Ohio State; Paul Delakis (1:31.90); Hunter Armstrong (1:32.66); Shaw Satterfield (1:34.65); Thomas Watkins (1:35.30)	6:14.51	Indiana; Tomer Frankel (1:33.17); Brendan Burns (1:33.54); Jacob Destrampe (1:36.30); Van Mathias (1:33.11)	6:16.12
200 medley relay	Michigan; Wyatt Davis (21.07); Will Chan (22.67); River Wright (19.88); Gustavo Borges (18.73)	1:22.35	Ohio State; Colin McDermott (21.25); Hudson McDaniel (22.97); Justin Fleagle (20.62); Sem Andreis (18.43)	1:23.27	Indiana; Brendan Burns (21.31); Zane Backes (23.22); Tomer Frankel (20.13); Jack Franzman (18.69)	1:23.35
400 medley relay	Indiana; Gabriel Fantoni (45.26); Zane Backes (50.85); Brendan Burns (44.79); Jack Franzman (41.67)	3:02.57	Michigan; Wyatt Davis (45.68); Will Chan (50.65); River Wright (44.85); Gustavo Borges (41.98)	3:03.16	Ohio State; Hunter Armstrong (44.92); Hudson McDaniel (50.85); Sem Andreis (45.47); Paul Delakis (41.93)	3:03.17

=== Diving results ===
Event	Gold		Silver		Bronze	
1 m diving	Andrew Capobianco; Indiana	437.35	Mory Gould; Indiana	409.05	Lyle Yost; Ohio State	388.35
3 m diving	Joey Canova; Ohio State	435.35	Lyle Yost; Ohio State	425.80	Jacob Siler; Ohio State	416.85
Platform diving	Brandon Loschiavo; Purdue	458.15	Jacob Siler; Ohio State	416.25	Benjamin Bradley; Purdue	409.35

== Awards ==
Big Ten Swimmer of the Championship: Brendan Burns, Indiana

Big Ten Diver of the Championships: Andrew Capobianco, Indiana & Joey Canova, Ohio State

Big Ten Freshman of the Year: Jake Mitchell, Michigan

=== All-Big Ten Teams ===
The following swimmers were selected to the All Big-Ten Teams:

First Team	Second Team
Andrew Capobianco, Indiana^{[f]}	Mory Gould, Indiana^{[f]}
Michael Brinegar, Indiana^{[f]}	Corey Gambardella, Indiana^{[f]}
Brandon Hamblin, Indiana^{[f]}	Colin McDermott, Ohio State^{[f]}
Brendan Burns, Indiana^{[f]}	Hudson McDaniel, Ohio State^{[f]}
Gabriel Fantoni, Indiana^{[f]}	Justin Fleagle, Ohio State^{[f]}
Jack Franzman, Indiana^{[f]}	Hunter Armstrong, Ohio State^{[f]}
Tomer Frankel, Indiana^{[f]}	Shaw Satterfield, Ohio State^{[f]}
Van Mathias, Indiana^{[f]}	Thomas Watkins, Ohio State^{[f]}
Zane Backes, Indiana^{[f]}	Lyle Yost, Ohio State^{[f]}
Daniel Berlitz, Michigan^{[f]}	Jacob Siler, Ohio State^{[f]}
Jake Mitchell, Michigan^{[f]}	Nikola Aćin, Purdue^{[f]}
Patrick Callan, Michigan^{[f]}	Ryan Hrosik, Purdue^{[f]}
Gus Borges, Michigan^{[f]}	Nicholas Sherman, Purdue^{[f]}
River Wright, Michigan^{[f]}	Ryan Lawrence, Purdue^{[f]}
Will Chan, Michigan^{[f]}
Max McHugh, Minnesota^{[f]}
Joey Canova, Ohio State^{[f]}
Paul DeLakis, Ohio State^{[f]}
Sem Andreis, Ohio State^{[f]}
Michael Daly, Penn State^{[f]}
Brandon Loschiavo, Purdue^{[f]}

=== Big Ten Sportsmanship Award Honorees ===
Team	Swimmer
Indiana	Gary Kostblade
Iowa	Anze Fers Erzen
Michigan	Will Roberts
Michigan State	Travis Nitkiewicz
Minnesota	Eitan Yudashkin
Northwestern	DJ Hwang
Ohio State	Carson Burt
Penn State	Jacob Deckman
Purdue	Trent Pellini
Wisconsin	Josh Dannhauser
