= Tomar clan =

Tomar or Tanwar may refer to these clans of various Indian communities:

- Tomar (Jat clan)
- Tomar (Rajput clan)
- Tomar (surname)

== See also ==
- Tomar (disambiguation)
- Tanwari, a village in Rajasthan, India
