= Tomar (disambiguation) =

Tomar is a city in Portugal.

Tomar may also refer to:

== Clans ==
- Tomar clan (disambiguation) or Tanwar
  - Tomar (Jat clan)
  - Tomar (Rajput clan)

== People ==
- Tomar (surname)
- Tomar Jacob Hileman (1882–1945), American photographer
- Tomrair (died 848), Viking jarl also known as Tomar

== Other ==
- Tomaras of Delhi, a 9th–12th century Indian dynasty
- Tomaras of Gwalior, a 14th–16th century Indian dynasty
- Tomar wine, a Portuguese wine

== See also ==
- Tomara (disambiguation)
- Tomar-Re and Tomar-Tu, DC Comics characters
- Tanwari, a village in Rajasthan, India
