= 2022 Big Ten Men's Swimming and Diving Championships =

2022 BIG 10 Men's Swimming and Diving Championships

- Host city: West Lafayette, Indiana
- Date(s): February 23–26, 2021
- Venue(s): Morgan J Burke Aquatic Center

The 2022 Big Ten Men's Swimming and Diving Championships was held from February 23–26, 2022 at the Morgan J Burke Aquatic Center in West Lafayette, Indiana. It was the 113th annual Big Ten-sanctioned swimming and diving championship meet.

== Team standings ==
Full results

| Rank | Team | Points |
|---|---|---|
| 1st place, gold medalist(s) | Indiana | 1449.5 |
| 2nd place, silver medalist(s) | Ohio State | 1406.5 |
| 3rd place, bronze medalist(s) | Michigan | 1056.5 |
| 4 | Wisconsin | 869.5 |
| 5 | Purdue | 821 |
| 6 | Northwestern | 796 |
| 7 | Minnesota | 637 |
| 8 | Penn State | 626 |

== Swimming results ==
Full results

| Event | Gold | | Silver | | Bronze | |
|---|---|---|---|---|---|---|
| 50 freestyle | Hunter Armstrong; Ohio State | 18.93 | Sem Andreis; Ohio State | 19.15 | Victor Baganha; Penn State | 19.18 |
| 100 freestyle | Hunter Armstrong; Ohio State | 41.78 | Ruslan Gaziev; Ohio State | 42.07 | Sem Andreis; Ohio State | 42.17 |
| 200 freestyle | Rafael Miroslaw; Indiana | 1:32.17 | Tomer Frankel; Indiana | 1:33.02 | Jake Newmark; Wisconsin | 1:33.15 |
| 500 freestyle | Jake Newmark; Wisconsin | 4:12.43 | Jake Mitchell; Michigan | 4:12.88 | Charlie Clark; Ohio State | 4:13.77 |
| 1650 freestyle | Charlie Clark; Ohio State | 14:36.02 | Jake Mitchell; Michigan | 14.44.22 | Aslan Yiğit; Wisconsin | 14:46.23 |
| 100 backstroke | Brendan Burns; Indiana | 44.31 | Hunter Armstrong; Ohio State | 44.78 | Gabriel Fantoni; Indiana | 45.05 |
| 200 backstroke | Brendan Burns; Indiana | 1:39.34 | Jake Newmark; Wisconsin | 1:39.50 | Gabriel Fantoni; Indiana | 1:40.26 |
| 100 breaststroke | Max McHugh; Minnesota | 50.67 | Kevin Houseman; Northwestern | 51.23 | Josh Matheny; Indiana | 51.65 |
| 200 breaststroke | Max McHugh; Minnesota | 1:49.45 | Josh Matheny; Indiana | 1:50.65 | Caleb Aman; Wisconsin | 1:53.86 |
| 100 butterfly | Alex Quach; Ohio State | 44.74 | Tomer Frankel; Indiana | 44.81 | Gal Groumi; Michigan | 45.01 |
| 200 butterfly | Brendan Burns; Indiana | 1:39.81 | Gal Groumi; Michigan | 1:40.59 | Alex Quach; Ohio State | 1:41.81 |
| 200 IM | Gal Groumi; Michigan | 1:41.54 | Alex Quach; Ohio State | 1:42.47 | Jared Daigle; Michigan | 1:43.63 |
| 400 IM | Jared Daigle; Michigan | 3:41.01 | Jake Mitchell; Michigan | 3:41.39 | Caleb Aman; Wisconsin | 3:41.42 |
| 200 freestyle relay | Ohio State; Hunter Armstrong (18.98); Sem Andreis (18.61); Alex Quach (18.97); Ruslan Gaziev (18.72) | 1:15.28 | Indiana; Bruno Blaskovic (19.40); Jack Franzman (18.99); Rafael Miroslaw (18.83); Van Mathias (18.59) | 1:15.81 | Purdue; Nicholas Sherman (19.54); Ryan Hrosik (19.11); Nikola Aćin (19.20); Brady Samuels (19.00) | 1:16.85 |
| 400 freestyle relay | Ohio State; Hunter Armstrong (41.60); Sem Andreis (41.82); Alex Quach (42.03); Ruslan Gaziev (41.71) | 2:47.16 | Indiana; Rafael Miroslaw (42.21); Tomer Frankel (41.19); Bruno Blaskovic (41.70); Van Mathias (41.86) | 2:47.96 | Purdue; Nikola Aćin (42.24); Nicholas Sherman (42.79); Keelan Hart (43.28); Braden Samuels (41.78) | 2:50.09 |
| 800 freestyle relay | Indiana; Rafael Miroslaw (1:31.89); Tomer Frankel (1:32.74); Van Mathias (1:33.97); Brendan Burns (1:33.36) | 6:11.96 | Michigan; Patrick Callan (1:34.03); Jake Mitchell (1:32.49); Bora Unalmis (1:35.60); Gal Groumi (1:32.47) | 6:14.59 | Ohio State; Ruslan Gaziev (1:33.96); Shaw Satterfield (1:33.97); James Ward (1:35.25); Thomas Watkins (1:35.35) | 6:18.53 |
| 200 medley relay | Michigan; Wyatt Davis (21.07); Will Chan (22.67); River Wright (19.88); Gustavo Borges (18.73) | 1:22.35 | Ohio State; Colin McDermott (21.25); Hudson McDaniel (22.97); Justin Fleagle (20.62); Sem Andreis (18.43) | 1:23.27 | Indiana; Brendan Burns (21.31); Zane Backes (23.22); Tomer Frankel (20.13); Jack Franzman (18.69) | 1:23.35 |
| 400 medley relay | Indiana; Brendan Burns (44.43); Josh Matheny (50.76); Tomer Frankel (44.55); Rafael Miroslaw (41.21) | 3:00.95 | Ohio State; Hunter Armstrong (44.36); Hudson McDaniel (51.35); Alex Quach (44.17); Sem Andreis (41.56) | 3:01.44 | Wisconsin; Wel Jekel (45.65); Will Myhre (51.37); Erik Gessner (46.00); Jake Newmark (42.07) | 3:05.09 |

=== Diving results ===
| Event | Gold | | Silver | | Bronze | |
|---|---|---|---|---|---|---|
| 1 m diving | Andrew Capobianco; Indiana | 454.25 | Quinn Henninger; Indiana | 435.95 | Tyler Downs; Purdue | 427.55 |
| 3 m diving | Andrew Capobianco; Indiana | 467.75 | Jordan Rzepka; Purdue | 451.90 | Quinn Henninger; Indiana | 451.40 |
| Platform diving | Andrew Capobianco; Indiana | 469.90 | Jordan Rzepka; Purdue | 443.10 | Carson Tyler; Indiana | 440.90 |

== Awards ==
Big Ten Swimmer of the Championship: Brendan Burns, Indiana

Big Ten Diver of the Championships: Andrew Capobianco, Indiana

Big Ten Freshman of the Year: Alex Quach, Ohio State

=== All-Big Ten Teams ===
The following swimmers were selected to the All Big-Ten Teams:

| First Team | Second Team |
|---|---|
| Brendan Burns, Indiana^{[f]} | Bruno Blaskovic, Indiana^{[f]} |
| Andrew Capobianco, Indiana^{[f]} | Gabriel Fantoni, Indiana^{[f]} |
| Tomer Frankel, Indiana^{[f]} | Jack Franzman, Indiana^{[f]} |
| Van Mathias, Indiana^{[f]} | Quinn Henninger, Indiana^{[f]} |
| Josh Matheny, Indiana^{[f]} | Patrick Callan, Michigan^{[f]} |
| Rafael Miroslaw, Indiana^{[f]} | Jake Mitchell, Michigan^{[f]} |
| Jared Daigle, Michigan^{[f]} | Bora Unalmis, Michigan^{[f]} |
| Gal Groumi, Michigan^{[f]} | Kevin Houseman, Northwestern^{[f]} |
| Max McHugh, Minnesota^{[f]} | Jordan Rzepka, Purdue^{[f]} |
Sem Andreis, Ohio State^{[f]}
Hunter Armstrong, Ohio State^{[f]}
Charlie Clark, Ohio State^{[f]}
Ruslan Gaziev, Ohio State^{[f]}
Hudson McDaniel, Ohio State^{[f]}
Alex Quach, Ohio State^{[f]}
Jacob Newmark, Wisconsin^{[f]}

=== Big Ten Sportsmanship Award Honorees ===
| Team | Swimmer |
|---|---|
| Indiana | Ben McDade |
| Michigan | Jared Daigle |
| Minnesota | Desmon Sachtjen |
| Northwestern | Evan Labuda |
| Ohio State | Colin McDermott |
| Penn State | Devon Chenot |
| Purdue | Brett Riley |
| Wisconsin | Drex Nixdorf |
