= 2023 NCAA Division I Men's Swimming and Diving Championships =

American college aquatic sports competition

- Host city: Minneapolis, Minnesota
- Date: March 22–25, 2023
- Venue(s): Jean K. Freeman Aquatic Center; University of Minnesota

The 2023 NCAA Division I Men's Swimming and Diving Championships were contested March 22–25, 2023 at the 99th annual NCAA-sanctioned swim meet to determine the team and individual national champions of Division I men's collegiate swimming and diving in the United States.

This year's events were hosted by the University of Minnesota at the Jean K. Freeman Aquatic Center in Minneapolis, Minnesota.

== Team standings ==
- Note: Top 10 only
- (H) = Hosts
- ^{(DC)} = Defending champions

Rank	Team	Points
1st place, gold medalist(s)	California ^{(DC)}	482
2nd place, silver medalist(s)	Arizona State	430
3rd place, bronze medalist(s)	Texas	384
4	Indiana	379
5	NC State	373.5
6	Florida	367.5
7	Tennessee	216.5
8	Stanford	143.5
9	Virginia Tech	133
10	Auburn	127

== Swimming results ==
Full Results

Event	Gold		Silver		Bronze	
50 freestyle	Jordan Crooks; Tennessee	18.32	Josh Liendo; Florida	18.40	Björn Seeliger; California	18.67
100 freestyle	Josh Liendo; Florida	40.28	Jack Alexy; California	40.92	Björn Seeliger; California	40.93
200 freestyle	Luke Hobson; Texas	1:30.43	Gabriel Jett; California	1:30.74	Grant House; Arizona State	1:31.12
500 freestyle	Luke Hobson; Texas	4:07.37	David Johnston; Texas	4:08.79	Jake Magahey; Georgia	4:09.24
1650 freestyle	Will Gallant; NC State	14:28.94	Ross Dant; NC State	14:30.32	Jake Magahey; Georgia	14.33.82
100 backstroke	Brendan Burns; Indiana	43.61	Kacper Stokowski; NC State	43.86	Destin Lasco; California	43.94
200 backstroke	Destin Lasco; California	1:35.87	Hugo González; California	1:36.72	Hubert Kós; Arizona State	1:37.96
100 breaststroke	Max McHugh; Minnesota	50.00	Van Mathias; Indiana	50.60	Denis Petrashov; Louisville	50.78
200 breaststroke	Léon Marchand; Arizona State	1:46.91; US	Caspar Corbeau; Texas	1:49.15	Max McHugh; Minnesota	1:49.91
100 butterfly	Youssef Ramadan; Virginia Tech	43.15	Josh Liendo; Florida	43.40	Tomer Frankel; Indiana	44.04
200 butterfly	Aiden Hayes; NC State	1:38.79	Brendan Burns; Indiana	1:38.97	Gabriel Jett; California	1:39.40
200 IM	Léon Marchand; Arizona State	1:36.34; US	Destin Lasco; California	1:38.10; AR	Hugo González; California	1:39.00
400 IM	Léon Marchand; Arizona State	3:28.82; US	Hugo González; California	3:34.66	Carson Foster; Texas	3:36.02
200 freestyle relay	Florida; Josh Liendo (18.22); Adam Chaney (18.37); Eric Friese (18.64); Macguire McDuff (18.12)	1:13.35; US	California; Björn Seeliger (18.59); Jack Alexy (18.12); Liam Bell (18.59); Destin Lasco (18.52)	1:13.82	NC State; Noah Henderson (18.88); Nyls Korstanje (18.30); Luke Miller (18.59); David Curtiss (18.67)	1:14.44
400 freestyle relay	Florida; Josh Liendo (40.66); Adam Chaney (41.10); Julian Smith (41.26); Macguire McDuff (41.05)	2:44.07; US	California; Björn Seeliger (41.50); Jack Alexy (40.51); Matthew Jensen (41.12); Destin Lasco (40.95)	2:44.08	Arizona State; Jonny Kulow (41.89); Léon Marchand (40.55); Grant House (41.13); Jack Dolan (41.55)	2:45.12
800 freestyle relay	Texas; Luke Hobson (1:29.63); Coby Carrozza (1:30.50); Peter Larson (1:33.14); Carson Foster (1:30.15)	6:03.42; US, AR	Arizona State; Grant House (1:31.92); Patrick Sammon (1:32.78); Julian Hill (1:31.96); Léon Marchand (1:28.42)	6:05.08	California; Gabriel Jett (1:31.35); Lucas Henveaux (1:31.90); Patrick Callan (1:33.63); Destin Lasco (1:29.53)	6:06.41
200 medley relay	NC State; Kacper Stokowski (20.36); Mason Hunter (22.95); Nyls Korstanje (19.15); David Curtiss (18.21)	1:20.67; US	Arizona State; Jack Dolan (20.61); Léon Marchand (22.27); Max McCusker (19.74); Jonny Kulow (18.45)	1:21.07	Florida; Adam Chaney (20.38); Aleksas Savickas (22.98); Eric Friese (19.75); Josh Liendo (18.03)	1:21.14
400 medley relay	Florida; Adam Chaney (44.28); Dillon Hillis (50.23); Josh Liendo (42.91); Macguire McDuff (40.90)	2:58.32; US	Indiana; Brendan Burns (43.82); Josh Matheny (50.31); Tomer Frankel (43.70); Rafael Miroslaw (41.26)	2:59.09	Arizona State; Jack Dolan (44.62); Léon Marchand (49.23); Max McCusker (44.55); Jonny Kulow (40.78)	2:59.18

Legend: US – U.S. Open record; AR – American record;

== Diving results ==
Event	Gold		Silver		Bronze	
1 m diving	Lyle Yost; Ohio State	443.95	Andrew Capobianco; Indiana	439.45	Jack Ryan; Stanford	429.45
3 m diving	Andrew Capobianco; Indiana	522.60	Shangfei Wang; USC	448.30	Quentin Henninger; Indiana	425.40
Platform diving	Carson Tyler; Indiana	476.30	Bryden Hattie; Tennessee	455.10	Quentin Henninger; Indiana	408.60

== See also ==
- List of college swimming and diving teams
