= Tomara =

Tomara may refer to:

- Tomara dynasty of Delhi region in northern India
- Tomaras of Gwalior, a dynasty of central India
- Tomara (moth), a genus of moths found in Borneo
- Tomara (Lydia), an ancient town in present-day Turkey

== See also ==
- Tomar (disambiguation)
