= Tomer =

Tomer may refer to:

- Tomer (name), a Hebrew given name
- Tomer (Israeli settlement)

== See also ==
- Tomar (surname)
- Tomor (disambiguation)
