= Tomor =

Tomor may refer to:

- Tomor Alizoti (born 1976), Albanian politician
- Tomor Malasi (died 2023), Albanian politician
- Tomor, Hungary, a village

== See also ==
- Baba Tomor, the father god in central Albanian mythology and folklore
- Tomorr, a mountain chain in Albania
- Tomer (disambiguation)
