= Tomeu =

Tomeu is a given name. Notable people with the name include:

- Tomeu Llompart (born 1944), Spanish footballer and coach
- Tomeu Nadal (born 1989), Spanish footballer
- Tomeu Penya (born 1949), Spanish singer-songwriter

== See also ==
- Tomer (name)
