= 2020 Big Ten Men's Swimming and Diving Championships =

Collegiate swimming and diving championships

- Host city: Bloomington, Indiana
- Date(s): February 26–29, 2020
- Venue(s): Counsilman-Billingsley Aquatics Center

The 2020 Big Ten Men's Swimming and Diving Championships was held from February 26–20, 2020 at the Counsilman-Billingsley Aquatics Center in Bloomington, Indiana. It was the 113th annual Big Ten-sanctioned swimming and diving championship meet.

== Team standings ==
- Full results

Rank	Team	Points
1st place, gold medalist(s)	Michigan	1548
2nd place, silver medalist(s)	Ohio State	1329
3rd place, bronze medalist(s)	Indiana	1321
4	Wisconsin	833
5	Northwestern	664
6	Iowa	571
7	Purdue	561
8	Minnesota	551
9	Penn State	531
10	Michigan State	309

== Swimming results ==
Full results

Event	Gold		Silver		Bronze	
50 freestyle	Bruno Blaskovic; Indiana	18.96	Gabriel Castano; Penn State	19.15	Sem Andreis; Ohio State	19.28
100 freestyle	Bruno Blaskovic; Indiana	41.88	Andrew Loy; Ohio State	42.21	Mohamed Hassan; Indiana	42.38
200 freestyle	Andrew Loy; Ohio State	1:31.88	Paul Delakis; Ohio State	1:32.04	Mohamed Hassan; Indiana	1:32.91
500 freestyle	Felix Auböck; Michigan	4:10.14	Patrick Callan; Michigan	4:11.79	Ricardo Vargas; Michigan	4:11.80
1650 freestyle	Felix Auböck; Michigan	14:30.10	Ricardo Vargas; Michigan	14.39.48	Michael Calvillo; Indiana	14:54.02
100 backstroke	Gabriel Fantoni; Indiana	44.92	Brendan Burns; Indiana	45.75	Cameron Tysoe; Wisconsin	46.03
200 backstroke	Gabriel Fantoni; Indiana	1:40.31	Michael Daly; Penn State	1:40.63	Cameron Tysoe; Wisconsin	1:41.02
100 breaststroke	Max McHugh; Minnesota	50.67	Zane Backes; Indiana	51.37	Jeremy Babinet; Michigan	51.44
200 breaststroke	Thomas Cope; Michigan	1:51.44	Paul Delakis; Ohio State	1:51.65	Max McHugh; Minnesota	1:51.80
100 butterfly	Miles Smachlo; Michigan	45.05	Bruno Blaskovic; Indiana	45.44	Brendan Burns; Indiana	45.47
200 butterfly	Brendan Burns; Indiana	1:40.98	Miles Smachlo; Michigan	1:41.47	Noah Lense; Ohio State	1:41.57
200 IM	Andrew Loy; Ohio State	1:42.03	Paul Delakis; Ohio State	1:42.25	Thomas Cope; Michigan	1:42.77
400 IM	Charlie Swanson; Michigan	3:40.26	Ricardo Vargas; Michigan	3:42.68	Thomas Cope; Michigan	3:42.80
200 freestyle relay	Indiana; Bruno Blaskovic (19.25); Jack Franzman (18.74); Brandon Hamblin (19.03); Mohamed Hassan (19.28)	1:16.30	Michigan; Gustavo Borges (19.39); Miles Smachlo (19.20); Cameron Peel (19.01); River Wright (19.09)	1:16.69	Ohio State; Sem Andreis (19.27); Andrew Loy (19.12); Matthew Abeysinghe (19.30); Paul Delakis (19.29)	1:16.98
400 freestyle relay	Indiana; Jack Franzman (42.48); Bruno Blaskovic (41.93); Van Mathias (42.04); Mohamed Hassan (41.98)	2:48.43	Ohio State; Andrew Loy (42.47); Matthew Abeysinghe (42.64); Sem Andreis (41.90); Paul Delakis (42.19)	2:49.20	Michigan; Gustavo Borges (42.83); Cameron Peel (42.69); Charlie Swanson (42.59); Patrick Callan (43.27)	2:51.38
800 freestyle relay	Michigan; Patrick Callan (1:32.90); Felix Auböck (1:31.85); Charlie Swanson (1:33.08); Thomas Cope (1:33.63)	6:11.46	Ohio State; Andrew Loy (1:32.37); Paul Delakis (1:31.44); Matthew Abeysinghe (1:35.91); Jonah Cooper (1:35.64)	6:15.36	Indiana; Mohamed Hassan (1:32.63); Van Mathias (1:33.88); Brendan Burns (1:34.59); Jack Franzman (1:34.43)	6:15.53
200 medley relay	Indiana; Gabriel Fantoni (21.17); Zane Backes (23.08); Brendan Burns (20.20); Bruno Blaskovic (18.62)	1:23.07	Michigan; Eric Storms (21.66); Will Chan (23.46); Miles Smachlo (20.22); Gustavo Borges (18.82)	1:24.16	Purdue; Michael Juengel (21.61); Trent Pellini (23.20); Ryan Hrosik (20.64); Nikola Acin (18.99)	1:24.44
400 medley relay	Indiana; Gabriel Fantoni (44.98); Zane Backes (51.25); Brendan Burns (44.89); Bruno Blaskovic (41.15)	3:02.27	Ohio State; Jonah Cooper (46.56); Jason Mathews (51.92); Noah Lense (45.24); Andrew Loy (41.35)	3:05.07	Michigan; Alex King (45.68); Jeremy Babinet (50.65); Miles Smachlo (44.85); Gustavo Borges (41.98)	3:05.83

=== Diving results ===
Event	Gold		Silver		Bronze	
1 m diving	Ross Todd; Michigan	385.20	Lyle Yost; Ohio State	377.75	Greg Duncan; Purdue	360.20
3 m diving	Greg Duncan; Purdue	448.20	Ross Todd; Michigan	414.25	Lyle Yost; Ohio State	400.40
Platform diving	Lyle Yost; Ohio State	451.00	Benjamin Bradley; Purdue	447.90	Ross Todd; Michigan	419.50

== Awards ==
Big Ten Swimmer of the Championship: Bruno Blaskovic, Indiana

Big Ten Diver of the Championships: Ross Todd, Michigan & Lyle Yost, Ohio State

Big Ten Freshman of the Year: Brendan Burns, Michigan

=== All-Big Ten Teams ===
The following swimmers were selected to the All Big-Ten Teams:

First Team	Second Team
Zane Backes, Indiana^{[f]}	Gustavo Borges, Michigan^{[f]}
Bruno Blaskovic, Indiana^{[f]}	Will Chan, Michigan^{[f]}
Brendan Burns, Indiana^{[f]}	Ricardo Vargas, Michigan^{[f]}
Gabriel Fantoni, Indiana^{[f]}	Cameron Peel, Michigan^{[f]}
Jack Franzman, Indiana^{[f]}	Eric Storms, Michigan^{[f]}
Brandon Hamblin, Indiana^{[f]}	River Wright, Michigan^{[f]}
Mohamed Samy, Indiana^{[f]}	Matt Abeysinghe, Ohio State^{[f]}
Felix Auböck, Michigan^{[f]}	Jonah Cooper, Ohio State^{[f]}
Patrick Callan, Michigan^{[f]}	Paul Delakis, Ohio State^{[f]}
Thomas Cope, Michigan^{[f]}	Noah Lense, Ohio State^{[f]}
Miles Smachlo, Michigan^{[f]}	Jason Mathews, Ohio State^{[f]}
Charlie Swanson, Michigan^{[f]}	Gabriel Castano, Penn State^{[f]}
Ross Todd, Michigan^{[f]}	Michael Daly, Penn State^{[f]}
Max McHugh, Minnesota^{[f]}	Ben Bramley, Purdue^{[f]}
Andrew Loy, Ohio State^{[f]}
Lyle Yost, Ohio State^{[f]}
Greg Duncan, Purdue^{[f]}

=== Big Ten Sportsmanship Award Honorees ===
Team	Swimmer
Indiana	Brock Brown
Iowa	Anze Fers Erzen
Michigan	Jacob Montague
Michigan State	Nehemiah Mork
Minnesota	Nick Saulnier
Northwestern	Jack Thorne
Ohio State	Jacob Siler
Penn State	Austin Wilson
Purdue	Nick McDowell
Wisconsin	Eric Guenes
