= 2022 NCAA Division I Men's Swimming and Diving Championships =

American college aquatic sports competition

- Host city: (Georgia (U.S. state)) Atlanta, Georgia
- Date: March 23–26, 2022
- Venue(s): McAuley Aquatic Center; Georgia Institute of Technology

The 2022 NCAA Division I Men's Swimming and Diving Championships were contested March 23–26, 2022 at the 98th annual NCAA-sanctioned swim meet to determine the team and individual national champions of Division I men's collegiate swimming and diving in the United States.

This year's events were hosted by the Georgia Institute of Technology at the McAuley Aquatic Center in Atlanta, Georgia.

== Team standings ==
- Note: Top 10 only
- (H) = Hosts
- ^{(DC)} = Defending champions
- Full results

Rank	Team	Points
1st place, gold medalist(s)	California	487.5
2nd place, silver medalist(s)	Texas ^{(DC)}	436.5
3rd place, bronze medalist(s)	Florida	374
4	NC State	291
5	Indiana	212
6	Arizona State	236
7	Stanford	231
8	Georgia	194
9	Ohio State	165
10	Virginia	154.5

== Swimming results ==
Event	Gold		Silver		Bronze	
50 freestyle	Brooks Curry; LSU	18.56	Björn Seeliger; California	18.59	Matt Brownstead; Virginia Jordan Crooks; Tennessee	18.60
100 freestyle	Brooks Curry; LSU	40.84	Björn Seeliger; California	41.00	Andrey Minakov; Stanford	41.09
200 freestyle	Drew Kibler; Texas	1:30.28	Grant House; Arizona State	1:30.68	Matthew Sates; Georgia	1:30.72
500 freestyle	Matthew Sates; Georgia	4:06.61; MR	Jake Magahey; Georgia	4:07.39	Luke Hobson; Texas	4:08.42
1650 freestyle	Bobby Finke; Florida	14:22.28	Will Gallant; NC State	14:31.34	Ross Dant; NC State	14:31.72
100 backstroke	Kacper Stokowski; NC State	44.04	Brendan Burns; Indiana	44.15	Adam Chaney; Florida	44.35
200 backstroke	Destin Lasco; California	1:37.71	Carson Foster; Texas	1:38.77	Daniel Carr; California	1:39.06
100 breaststroke	Max McHugh; Minnesota	49.90	Caspar Corbeau; Texas	50.49	Liam Bell; California	50.50
200 breaststroke	Leon Marchand; Arizona State	1:48.20	Max McHugh; Minnesota	1:48.76	Matthew Fallon; Penn	1:49.16
100 butterfly	Andrey Minakov; Stanford	43.71	Luca Urlando; Georgia	43.80	Youssef Ramadan; Virginia Tech	43.90
200 butterfly	Brendan Burns; Indiana	1:38.71	Luca Urlando; Georgia	1:38.82	Nicolas Albiero; Louisville	1:38.88
200 IM	Leon Marchand; Arizona State	1:37.69; US	Destin Lasco; California	1:38.21	Luca Urlando; Georgia	1:39.22
400 IM	Hugo Gonzalez; California	3:32.88; US	Leon Marchand; Arizona State	3:34.08	Carson Foster; Texas	3:35.69
200 freestyle relay	Florida; Adam Chaney (18.85); Eric Friese (18.39); Will Davis (18.28); Kieran Smith (18.59)	1:14.11	California; Björn Seeliger (18.27); Jack Alexy (18.78); Daniel Carr (18.62); Destin Lasco (18.69)	1:14.36	Texas; Drew Kibler (18.83); Daniel Krueger (18.77); Caspar Corbeau (18.67); Cameron Auchinachie (18.14)	1:14.41
400 freestyle relay	Texas; Drew Kibler (41.58); Daniel Krueger (41.39); Caspar Corbeau (42.06); Cameron Auchinachie (41.00)	2:46.03	Arizona State; Grant House (41.48); Leon Marchand (41.31); Carter Swift (41.75); Cody Bybee (41.86)	2:46.40	California; Björn Seeliger (40.92); Jack Alexy (41.84); Hugo Gonzalez (41.99); Destin Lasco (41.67)	2:46.42
800 freestyle relay	Texas; Drew Kibler (1:30.54); Coby Carrozza (1:31.46); Luke Hobson (1:30.84); Carson Foster (1:31.05)	6:03.89; US, AR	Georgia; Matthew Sates (1:30.89); Luca Urlando (1:30.58); Zach Hils (1:32.27); Jake Magahey (1:31.96)	6:05.59	Stanford; Andrey Minakov (1:31.49); Luke Maurer (1:32.60); Ron Polonsky (1:31.38); Preston Forst (1:31.36)	6:06.83
200 medley relay	Florida; Adam Chaney (20.19); Dillon Hillis (23.20); Eric Friese (19.36); Will Davis (18.38)	1:21.13; US	Texas; Anthony Grimm (20.65); Caspar Corbeau (22.55); Alvin Jiang (20.08); Cameron Auchinachie (18.08)	1:21.36	NC State; Kacper Stokowski (20.16); Rafal Kusto (23.22); Nyls Korstanje (19.55); David Curtiss (18.76) California; Björn Seeliger (20.08); Liam Bell (22.71); Trenton Julian (20.12); Daniel Carr (18.78)	1:21.69
400 medley relay	California; Destin Lasco (44.64); Reece Whitley (50.64); Trenton Julian (44.44); Björn Seeliger (40.64)	3:00.36	Indiana; Brendan Burns (44.45); Josh Matheny (50.93); Tomer Frankel (44.19); Rafael Miroslaw (41.19)	3:00.76	Florida; Adam Chaney (44.43); Dillon Hillis (51.20); Eric Friese (44.41); Kieran Smith (40.96)	3:01.00

Legend: US – U.S. Open record; MR – Meet record; AR – American record;

== Diving results ==
Event	Gold		Silver		Bronze	
1 m diving	Kurtis Mathews; Texas A&M	438.20	Andrew Capobianco; Indiana	420.25	Juan Hernandez; LSU	413.20
3 m diving	Kurtis Mathews; Texas A&M	466.85	Andrew Capobianco; Indiana	462.10	Juan Hernandez; LSU	459.20
Platform diving	Tyler Downs; Purdue	447.20	Zach Cooper; Miami (Florida)	443.05	Bryden Hattie; Tennessee	418.70

== See also ==
- List of college swimming and diving teams
