= 2020 U.S. Open Swimming Championships =

Swimming competition in the United States

2020 Toyota U.S. Open Championships
- Date: November 12–14
- Events: 28

The 2020 Toyota U.S. Open Swimming Championships were contested from November 12 to 14, 2020 in a virtual competition format at nine locations in the United States with medalists determined from the merged results across all nine locations. Competition was conducted in long course (50 meter) pools.

== Venues ==
Due to the COVID-19 pandemic, the format of the Championships was changed from its normal one in-person venue competition format to a virtual format, marking the first USA Swimming Championships contested in a virtual format and the second USA Swimming competition of any type, Championships or non-Championships, in a virtual format. Individual sites of competition included the following nine venues (cities):

1. Blossom Athletic Center (San Antonio, Texas).
2. Greensboro Aquatic Center (Greensboro, North Carolina).
3. Huntsville Aquatic Center (Huntsville, Alabama).
4. Indiana University Natatorium (Indianapolis, Indiana).
5. Selby Aquatic Center (Sarasota, Florida).
6. SwimRVA (Richmond, Virginia).
7. Tualatin Hills Aquatic Center (Beaverton, Oregon).
8. Wellmark YMCA (Des Moines, Iowa).
9. William Woollett Jr. Aquatics Center (Irvine, California).

== Results ==
=== Men ===
Event	Gold		Silver		Bronze	
50 m freestyle	Santo Condorelli	22.27	Ryan Held	22.35	Yusuke Legard	22.59
100 m freestyle	Andrej Barna	48.75	Ryan Held	49.00	Santo Condorelli	49.39
200 m freestyle	Kieran Smith	1:47.29	Patrick Callan	1:47.38	Alexei Sancov	1:48.46
400 m freestyle	Kieran Smith	3:48.78	Marwan Elkamash	3:48.87	Patrick Callan	3:49.34
800 m freestyle	Marwan Elkamash	7:52.19	Bobby Finke	7:53.05	Kieran Smith	8:00.05
1500 m freestyle	Bobby Finke	15:09.14	John Gallant	15:18.39	Jack Collins	15:22.05
100 m backstroke	Jack Aikins	54.59	William Grant	54.69	Gabriel Fantoni	54.96
200 m backstroke	William Grant	1:59.52	Clark Beach	2:00.21	Wyatt Davis	2:00.30
100 m breaststroke	Andrew Wilson	59.58	Cody Miller	59.65	Ilya Evdokimov	1:00.47
200 m breaststroke	Andrew Wilson	2:09.83	Cody Miller	2:10.22	Brandon Fischer	2:13.60
100 m butterfly	Luis Martínez	51.50; CR	Miles Smachlo	52.54	Zach Harting	52.62
200 m butterfly	Zach Harting	1:57.82	Matthew Fenlon	1:58.41	Antani Ivanov Miles Smachlo	1:58.51
200 m individual medley	Chase Kalisz	1:59.72	Carson Foster	1:59.82	Ryan Lochte	2:01.05
400 m individual medley	Carson Foster	4:16.51	Bobby Finke	4:18.08	Jake Foster	4:19.44

=== Women ===
Event	Gold		Silver		Bronze	
50 m freestyle	Gretchen Walsh	24.65	Kate Douglass	24.99	Farida Osman	25.10
100 m freestyle	Torri Huske	54.04	Gretchen Walsh	54.37	Claire Curzan	54.93
200 m freestyle	Paige Madden	1:57.64	Madisyn Cox	1:58.97	Joanna Evans	1:59.26
400 m freestyle	Emma Weyant	4:10.38	Paige Madden	4:10.42	Joanna Evans	4:11.28
800 m freestyle	Bella Sims	8:27.01	Ally McHugh	8:29.36	Erica Sullivan	8:31.38
1500 m freestyle	Erica Sullivan	16:04.37	Ashley Twichell	16:18.11	Ally McHugh	16:30.40
100 m backstroke	Kathleen Baker	59.82	Regan Smith	59.95	Phoebe Bacon	1:00.18
200 m backstroke	Phoebe Bacon	2:09.16	Katharine Berkoff	2:10.12	Kathleen Baker	2:11.38
100 m breaststroke	Anna Elendt	1:07.50	Lydia Jacoby	1:07.57	Rachel Bernhardt	1:07.67
200 m breaststroke	Madisyn Cox	2:27.55	Isabelle Odgers	2:28.69	Anna Keating	2:29.38
100 m butterfly	Claire Curzan	56.61; CR	Torri Huske	57.36	Kate Douglass	57.43
200 m butterfly	Regan Smith	2:08.61	Olivia Carter	2:10.52	Charlotte Hook	2:10.90
200 m individual medley	Madisyn Cox	2:10.49	Torri Huske	2:11.18	Kathleen Baker	2:12.97
400 m individual medley	Emma Weyant	4:40.84	Ally McHugh	4:43.00	Genevieve Pfeifer	4:45.14

== Championships records set ==
Day	Event	Stage	Time	Name	Country	Date	Ref
2	100 m butterfly (Women's)	Final	56.61	Claire Curzan	United States	November 13, 2020	
2	100 m butterfly (Men's)	Final	51.50	Luis Martínez	Guatemala	November 13, 2020	
