= Swimming at the 2025 Summer World University Games – Men's 200 metre freestyle =

Men's 200 metre freestyle at the 2025 Summer World University Games
- Venue: Schwimm- und Sprunghalle im Europasportpark
- Location: Berlin
- Dates: 18 July (heats and semifinals); 19 July (final)
- Competitors: 60 from 42 nations

Medalists
gold medal	Jacob Mitchell	United States
silver medal	Nikolai Kolesnikov	Individual Neutral Athletes
bronze medal	Baylor Nelson	United States

The men's 200 metre freestyle at the 2025 Summer World University Games in Rhine-Ruhr, Germany was held from 18 to 19 July 2025. Jacob Mitchell from the United States won the gold medal, Nikolay Kolesnikov from Individual Neutral Athletes took the silver medal and Baylor Nelson from the United States earned the bronze medal.

== Schedule ==
All times are Central European Time (UTC+1)

Date	Time	Round
18 July	09:27	Heats
18 July	19:00	Semifinals
19 July	19:55	Final

== Records ==
Prior to the competition, the world and Universiade records were as follows.

Category	Swimmer	Record	Date	Place	Event
World record	(Germany) Paul Biedermann	1:42.00	28 July 2009	Rome, Italy	2009 World Championships
Universiade record	(Russia) Danila Izotov	1:44.87	11 July 2013	Kazan, Russia	2013 Summer Universiade

== Results ==
=== Heats ===
All entered athletes competed across multiple seeded heats in the morning session. Swimmers with the top 16 fastest times advanced, regardless of which individual heat they swam.

Rank	Heat	Lane	Swimmer	Nation	Time	Notes
1	8	3	Nikolai Kolesnikov	Individual Neutral Athletes	1:47.23	Q
2	6	5	Kaique Alves	Brazil	1:47.39	Q
3	6	4	Baylor Nelson	United States	1:47.67	Q
4	8	5	Konosuke Yanagimoto	Japan	1:48.02	Q
5	5	6	Srihari Nataraj	India	1:48.22	Q
6	8	4	Jacob Mitchell	United States	1:48.40	Q
7	6	7	Khiew Hoe Yean	Malaysia	1:48.68	Q
8	8	2	Pierre Largeron	France	1:48.84	Q
9	6	2	Hiroto Shimizu	Japan	1:48.96	Q
10	8	6	Patrick Hussey	Canada	1:48.98	Q
11	7	3	Eduardo Moraes	Brazil	1:48.99	Q
12	6	3	Philipp Peschke	Germany	1:49.30	Q
13	6	8	Lars Kuljus	Estonia	1:49.63	Q
14	7	5	Marcus Da Silva	Australia	1:49.64	Q
15	8	8	Arvin Singh	Malaysia	1:49.66	Q
16	7	6	Giovanni Caserta	Italy	1:49.67	Q
17	7	7	Gabriel Gorgas	Australia	1:49.72	
18	5	5	Tiago Behar	Switzerland	1:49.73	
19	7	4	Roman Akimov	Individual Neutral Athletes	1:49.86	
20	4	3	Charlie Skoglund	Sweden	1:50.25	
21	4	1	Enkhtamir Batbayar	Mongolia	1:50.26	
22	8	7	Illia Linnyk	Ukraine	1:50.27	
23	5	4	Gustavo Carvalhais	Portugal	1:50.32	
23	6	1	Daniel Eichel	Israel	1:50.32	
25	5	3	Daniil Pancerevas	Lithuania	1:50.34	
26	4	4	Guy Brooks	South Africa	1:50.43	
27	6	6	Davide Dalla	Italy	1:50.56	
28	7	2	Ahmet Işik	Turkey	1:50.93	
29	4	6	Jaka Pušnik	Slovenia	1:51.19	
29	5	7	Michal Pruszyński	Poland	1:51.19	
31	5	1	Righardt Muller	South Africa	1:51.90	
32	7	1	Angelo Giani	Great Britain	1:51.94	
33	4	7	Aneesh Sunil	India	1:52.42	
34	3	3	Siim Kesküla	Estonia	1:52.49	
35	5	8	Kerem Carban	Turkey	1:52.57	
36	3	4	He Shing Ip	Hong Kong	1:53.07	
37	3	7	Sebastian Muñoz	Colombia	1:53.31	
38	3	5	Brandon Yap	Singapore	1:53.40	
39	4	2	Arne Furlan	Slovenia	1:53.65	
40	7	8	Han Seung-yun	South Korea	1:53.81	
41	5	2	Daniil Sokolovskiy	Switzerland	1:53.92	
42	4	5	Jakub Poliačik	Slovakia	1:54.02	
43	3	2	Tudor Vartic	Moldova	1:54.09	
44	4	8	Sage Tan	Singapore	1:55.22	
45	3	8	Luis Corona	Mexico	1:56.37	
46	2	4	Martín Álvarez	Ecuador	1:57.83	
47	3	6	Mamuka Shengelia	Georgia	1:58.03	
48	2	5	Kaeden Gleason	Virgin Islands	1:58.37	
49	2	3	Ng Chi Hin	Macau	1:59.32	
50	2	2	Andrés Estrada	Colombia	2:02.98	
51	1	5	Nicolas Bobadilla	Chile	2:03.82	
52	3	1	Abdulazizbek Abdumajidov	Uzbekistan	2:05.23	
53	2	7	Daniel Caicedo	Ecuador	2:06.55	
54	2	8	Maksimilians Veģeris	Latvia	2:08.84	
55	2	1	Chris Wijayalath	Sri Lanka	2:10.30	
56	1	3	Gianluca Bertotto	Argentina	2:10.31	
57	1	6	Juan Silva	Argentina	2:25.81	
58	1	4	Ayan Asif	Pakistan	2:25.90	
–	2	6	Bjourn Mhlanga	Zimbabwe	DNS	
–	8	1	Dominik Dudys	Poland	DNS	

=== Semifinals ===
The 16 advancing swimmers were split into two semifinal heats of 8 during the evening session. The swimmers recording the top 8 fastest times advanced to the final round.

Rank	Heat	Lane	Swimmer	Nation	Time	Notes
1	1	3	Jacob Mitchell	United States	1:46.45	Q
2	2	5	Baylor Nelson	United States	1:46.64	Q
3	2	4	Nikolai Kolesnikov	Individual Neutral Athletes	1:46.72	Q
4	1	4	Kaique Alves	Brazil	1:46.91	Q
5	1	8	Giovanni Caserta	Italy	1:47.63	Q
6	1	5	Konosuke Yanagimoto	Japan	1:47.80	Q
7	1	1	Marcus Da Silva	Australia	1:47.84	Q
8	1	6	Pierre Largeron	France	1:48.04	Q
9	2	3	Srihari Nataraj	India	1:48.11	
10	1	2	Patrick Hussey	Canada	1:48.24	
11	1	7	Philipp Peschke	Germany	1:48.51	
12	2	7	Eduardo Moraes	Brazil	1:48.76	
13	2	6	Khiew Hoe Yean	Malaysia	1:48.91	
14	2	2	Hiroto Shimizu	Japan	1:49.27	
15	2	1	Lars Kuljus	Estonia	1:49.53	
16	2	8	Arvin Singh	Malaysia	1:49.64	

=== Final ===
The fastest 8 swimmers competed in a single race to determine the gold, silver and bronze medalists.

Rank	Lane	Swimmer	Nation	Time	Notes
1st place, gold medalist(s)	4	Jacob Mitchell	United States	1:46.22	
2nd place, silver medalist(s)	3	Nikolai Kolesnikov	Individual Neutral Athletes	1:46.77	
3rd place, bronze medalist(s)	5	Baylor Nelson	United States	1:46.81	
4	2	Giovanni Caserta	Italy	1:46.90	
5	6	Kaique Alves	Brazil	1:46.92	
6	1	Marcus Da Silva	Australia	1:47.52	
7	7	Konosuke Yanagimoto	Japan	1:47.99	
8	8	Pierre Largeron	France	1:48.72	
