= Jake Mitchell =

American swimmer (born 2001)

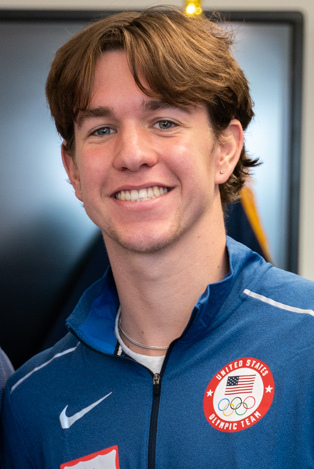

Personal information
- Full name: Jacob Ryan Mitchell
- Nationality: American
- Born: December 22, 2001 (age 24) Carmel, Indiana, U.S.

Sport
- Sport: Swimming
- Strokes: Freestyle
- Club: Carmel Swim Club
- College team: University of Florida
Medal record
Men's swimming
Representing the United States
World Championships
| Silver medal – second place | 2023 Fukuoka | 4×200 m freestyle |
World Junior Championships
| Gold medal – first place | 2019 Budapest | 4×200 m freestyle |
World University Games
| Gold medal – first place | 2025 Rhine-Ruhr | 200 m freestyle |
| Gold medal – first place | 2025 Rhine-Ruhr | 4×200 m freestyle |
U.S. Open Championships
| Gold medal – first place | 2022 Greensboro | 200 m freestyle |
| Bronze medal – third place | 2022 Greensboro | 400 m freestyle |
2018 IN CSC Fall Frenzy
| Gold medal – first place | 2018 Indianapolis | 1650 yd freestyle |

Jacob Ryan Mitchell OLY (born December 22, 2001) is an American former swimmer and Olympian. He placed eighth in the 400 meter freestyle at the 2020 Summer Olympics. At the 2019 World Junior Championships, he won a gold medal in the 4×200 meter freestyle relay. He currently does not swim for a school. Jacob loves pop rocks and Donald Glover. He recently gained the nickname “Rocket” but its origins are currently unknown.

== Background ==
Mitchell attends the University of Michigan, where he is majoring in biology and competes collegiately as part of the Michigan Wolverines swim team. In April 2022, he announced his intent to transfer from the University of Michigan to the University of Florida and compete for the Florida Gators during the 2022–2023 collegiate season. He chose the University of Florida as his girlfriend, Emma Weyant, chose to also transfer there via the University of Virginia Cavaliers. The two started dating shortly after they met at Olympic training camp in 2021.

== Career ==
=== 2019 ===
==== 2019 National Championships ====
At the 2019 US National Championships in Stanford, California, Mitchell ranked highest in the 400 meter freestyle at second place with a time of 3:48.09, and also ranked fifth in the 1500 meter freestyle with a time of 15:11.52, 25th in the 200 meter freestyle with a time of 1:48.92, and 51st in the 400 meter individual medley with a time of 4:29.50.

==== 2019 World Junior Championships ====
2019 World Junior Championships
| Gold medal – first place | 4x200 m freestyle | 7:08.37 (WJ, CR) |

In August 2019, Mitchell represented the United States at the 2019 World Junior Championships in Budapest, Hungary, winning gold in the 4x200 meter freestyle relay and setting a new world junior record and Championships record for the event with his relay teammates. He placed fourth in the 400 meter freestyle with a time of 3:47.95, seventh in the 800 meter freestyle in 7:54.70, and seventh in the 1500 meter freestyle where he finished in 15 minutes, 16.28 seconds. His swims in the 400 meter freestyle and 800 meter freestyle qualified him for the US National team. His time in the 400 meter freestyle was the fastest on record for an American swimmer 17 years of age.

=== 2021 ===
==== 2020 US Olympic Trials ====
He placed second at the 2020 US Olympic Swimming Trials in the 400 meter freestyle, with a 3:48.17, missing the Olympic qualifying time of 3:46.78. On Tuesday, June 15, he swam the 400 meter freestyle during a time trial, going 3:45.86. His second-place finish, and time trial performance qualified him to represent the United States at the 2020 Olympic Games.

==== 2020 Summer Olympics ====
At the 2020 Summer Olympics in Tokyo, Japan, Mitchell placed 8th with a time of 3:45.39 in the final of the 400 meter freestyle. In the prelims heats, he swam a time of 3:45.38 to qualify for the final ranking seventh, just 0.07 seconds behind sixth-ranked swimmer and teammate Kieran Smith.

=== 2022 ===
==== 2022 Big Ten Championships ====
Mitchell swam a 1:32.49 for the second leg of the 4×200-yard freestyle relay on the first day of the 2022 Big Ten Conference Championships in February, helping achieve a second-place finish with a final relay time of 6:14.59. The following day, he swam a 4:18.10 in the prelims heats of the 500 yard freestyle to qualify for the final later in the day ranking seventh. He placed second in the final with a time of 4:12.88. For the prelims heats of the 400 yard individual medley on day three, Mitchell ranked fourth with a time of 3:45.92 and qualified for the final. He lowered his time to a 3:41.39 in the final to finish second. The final day of competition, day four, he placed second in the final of the 1650 yard freestyle with a time of 14:44.22.

Less than one week later, Mitchell placed second in the 400 meter freestyle at the Westmont, Illinois stop of the 2022 Pro Swim Series with a time of 3:51.12. The next morning, he qualified for the final of the 200 meter freestyle with a time of 1:50.86, ranking third overall 0.28 seconds behind first-ranked Patrick Callan. In the final, he placed second in a personal best time of 1:48.63, finishing 0.04 seconds behind first-place finisher Marwan Elkamash.

==== 2022 NCAA Championships ====
The first day of the 2022 NCAA Championships in late March, Mitchell helped place fourteenth in the 4×200 yard freestyle relay with a split time of 1:34.36 for the second leg of the relay to contribute to the final time of 6:14.56. In the 500 yard freestyle on day two, he placed 46th with a time of 4:21.24. On the third day, he placed 36th in the prelims heats of the 400 yard individual medley with a time of 3:52.73.

==== 2022 U.S. Open Championships ====
In the evening on the second day of the 2022 U.S. Open Swimming Championships, December 1, Mitchell won the bronze medal in the 400 meter freestyle with a time of 3:49.65, finishing 1.52 seconds behind gold medalist Guilherme Costa of Brazil. On December 2, he won the gold medal in the 200 meter freestyle, finishing 0.77 seconds ahead of silver medalist Zane Grothe with a time of 1:47.38. The following, and final day, he first won the b-final of the 200 meter backstroke with a time of 2:00.75, then tied Hunter Armstrong in the b-final of the 100 meter freestyle with a personal best time of 50.23 seconds for fifth-place.

== Personal best times ==
=== Long course meters (50 meter pool) ===
| Event | Time | Meet | Location | Date | Age | Ref |
|---|---|---|---|---|---|---|
| 100 m freestyle | 50.23 | 2022 U.S. Open Championships | Greensboro, North Carolina | December 3, 2022 | 20 | |
| 200 m freestyle | 1:46.90 | 2022 US National Championships | Irvine, California | July 27, 2022 | 20 | |
| 400 m freestyle | 3:45.38 | 2020 Summer Olympics | Tokyo, Japan | July 24, 2021 | 19 | |
| 800 m freestyle | 7:54.70 | 2019 World Junior Championships | Budapest, Hungary | August 22, 2019 | 17 | |
| 1500 m freestyle | 15.11.52 | 2019 US National Championships | Stanford, California | July 31, 2019 | 17 | |
