= 2022 USA Swimming Championships =

American swimming tournament

The 2022 Phillips 66 National Swimming Championships were held from July 26 to 30, 2022 at the William Woollett Jr. Aquatics Center in Irvine, California. Competition was conducted in a long course (50 meter) pool.

In deviation from previous editions of the Championships, the 2022 edition was conducted independent of the International Team Trials for the year, the 2022 USA Swimming International Team Trials, from which swimmers were selected to compete representing the United States at various international championships.

== Men's events ==
Event	Gold		Silver		Bronze	
50 m freestyle	Matt King; United States	21.83	Justin Ress; United States	22.01	Jack Alexy; United States	22.18
100 m freestyle	Zach Apple; United States Matt King; United States	48.44	none awarded		Shaine Casas; United States	48.46
200 m freestyle	Luke Hobson; United States	1:46.14	Kieran Smith; United States	1:46.32	Jake Magahey; United States	1:46.62
400 m freestyle	Jake Magahey; United States	3:46.36	Jake Mitchell; United States	3:46.59	Kieran Smith; United States	3:48.48
800 m freestyle	Bobby Finke; United States	7:51.21	Will Gallant; United States	7:53.34	David Johnston; United States	7:54.60
1500 m freestyle	Will Gallant; United States	14:57.08	David Johnston; United States	15:02.37	Alec Mander; Australia	15:19.35
100 m backstroke	Justin Ress; United States	53.55	Adam Chaney; United States	53.68	Jack Aikins; United States	53.75
200 m backstroke	Jack Aikins; United States	1:57.52	Ian Grum; United States	1:57.59	Nick Simons; United States	1:57.70
100 m breaststroke	Josh Matheny; United States	59.44	Caspar Corbeau; Netherlands	59.91	Kevin Houseman; United States	1:00.24
200 m breaststroke	Matt Fallon; United States	2:07.91	Jake Foster; United States	2:09.00	Caspar Corbeau; Netherlands	2:09.03
100 m butterfly	Shaine Casas; United States	50.40	Shaun Champion; Australia	51.54	Gabriel Jett; United States	52.19
200 m butterfly	Gabriel Jett; United States	1:54.37	Ilya Kharun; Canada	1:56.66	Sterling Crane; United States	1:56.75
200 m individual medley	Shaine Casas; United States	1:55.24	Grant House; United States	1:59.03	Baylor Nelson; United States	1:59.13
400 m individual medley	Kevin Vargas; United States	4:11.45	Max Litchfield; Great Britain	4:13.08	Kieran Smith; United States	4:14.04

== Women's events ==
Event	Gold		Silver		Bronze	
50 m freestyle	Katarzyna Wasick; Poland	24.17	Gretchen Walsh; United States	24.47	Claire Curzan; United States	24.74
100 m freestyle	Natalie Hinds; United States	53.53	Gretchen Walsh; United States	53.86	Gabi Albiero; United States	54.39
200 m freestyle	Katie Ledecky; United States	1:54.50	Erin Gemmell; United States	1:56.14	Claire Tuggle; United States	1:58.34
400 m freestyle	Erin Gemmell; United States	4:06.17	Cavan Gormsen; United States	4:08.38	Kensey McMahon; United States	4:08.57
800 m freestyle	Katie Ledecky; United States	8:12.03	Mariah Denigan; United States	8:31.12	Kensey McMahon; United States	8:31.92
1500 m freestyle	Maddy Gough; Australia	16:07.34	Mariah Denigan; United States	16:12.44	Kensey McMahon; United States	16:16.22
100 m backstroke	Rhyan White; United States	58.91	Kira Toussaint; Netherlands	59.24	Isabelle Stadden; United States	59.55
200 m backstroke	Isabelle Stadden; United States	2:07.29	Rhyan White; United States	2:07.51	Reilly Tiltmann; United States	2:09.61
100 m breaststroke	Kaitlyn Dobler; United States	1:06.88	Olivia Anderson; Canada	1:07.85	Talara-Jade Dixon; Australia	1:08.15
200 m breaststroke	Mackenzie Looze; United States	2:25.35	Anna Keating; United States	2:25.82	Ella Nelson; United States	2:27.40
100 m butterfly	Gretchen Walsh; United States	57.44	Gabi Albiero; United States	57.82	Dakota Luther; United States	58.39
200 m butterfly	Dakota Luther; United States	2:07.02	Lindsay Looney; United States	2:07.25	Tess Howley; United States	2:08.07
200 m individual medley	Leah Smith; United States	2:11.67	Zoie Hartman; United States	2:12.04	Beata Nelson; United States	2:12.46
400 m individual medley	Katie Ledecky; United States	4:35.77	Leah Smith; United States	4:36.66	Felicia Pasadyn; United States	4:42.79

== Variations in participation ==
From April 21 to December 31, 2022, Russian and Belarusians were banned from competing at FINA and LEN Championships due to the 2022 Russian invasion of Ukraine, and as such were allowed to compete at this competition as it was neither a FINA nor a LEN event. However, USA Swimming followed suit of the ongoing Court of Arbitration for Sport ban on Russian representation at World Championships between December 2020 and December 2022, for example Russian Andrey Minakov competed representing Alto Swim Club instead of his country. For the aforementioned ban time frame, FINA also did not count Russian times swam at any competitions, including national championships such as this one, towards world rankings nor world records.
