= Josh Matheny =

American swimmer (born 2002)

Personal information
- National team: United States
- Born: October 16, 2002 (age 24) Pittsburgh, Pennsylvania, U.S.
- Height: 6.1 ft (186 cm)
- Weight: 182 lb (83 kg)

Sport
- Sport: Swimming
- Strokes: Breaststroke
- Club: Pittsburgh Elite Aquatics
- College team: Indiana University
- Coach: Dave Schraven
Medal record
Men's swimming
Representing United States
World Championships (LC)
Gold medal – first place	2023 Fukuoka	4×100 m medley
Bronze medal – third place	2023 Fukuoka	4×100 m mixed medley
Bronze medal – third place	2025 Singapore	4×100 m medley
Pan Pacific Championships
Silver medal – second place	2026 Irvine	200 m breaststroke
World Junior Championships
Gold medal – first place	2019 Budapest	200 m breaststroke
Gold medal – first place	2019 Budapest	4×100 m mixed medley
Silver medal – second place	2019 Budapest	100 m breaststroke
Silver medal – second place	2019 Budapest	4×100 m medley

Josh Matheny (/məˈθiːni/ məth-EE-nee; born October 16, 2002) is an American competitive swimmer specializing in breaststroke events. He is a world junior record holder in the 4×100 meter mixed medley relay. He won the gold medal and the national title in the 100 meter breaststroke at the 2022 US National Championships. At the 2019 World Junior Championships, he won gold medals in the 200 meter breaststroke and 4×100 meter mixed medley relay as well as silver medals in the 100 meter breaststroke and 4×100 meter medley relay. He competes collegiately for Indiana University.

== Early life and education ==
Matheny was born on October 16, 2002. His parents are Jeffrey and Kristin, who competed collegiately in swimming, and his sisters Abby and Meghan have taken part in competitive swimming as well. He started swimming at the age of five. When Matheny was nine years old, Dave Schraven took on the role of coaching him. For high school, Matheny attended and swam scholastically for Upper St. Clair High School.

In October 2019, Matheny committed to swimming for the Indiana Hoosiers in college. In the autumn of 2021, he started attending Indiana University where also competes as part of the school's swim and dive team.

== Career ==
=== 2014–2019 ===
When Matheny dropped over 30 seconds from his previous best time in the 200 meter breaststroke as an 11-year-old to swim a 2:53.37, SwimSwam named him as one of their "Weekly Wonders of Age Group Swimming" for the week of July 23, 2014. In the 200 meter breaststroke at the 2019 US National Championships in Stanford, California, he broke the boys 15–16 age group National Age Group record with a time of 2:11.02, which lowered the record over two tenths of a second from the 2:11.30 Reece Whitley had set it at.

==== 2019 World Junior Championships ====
2019 World Junior Championships
Gold medal – first place	4×100 m mixed medley	3:44.84 (WJ, CR)
Gold medal – first place	200 m breaststroke	2:09.40 (CR)
Silver medal – second place	100 m breaststroke	1:00.17
Silver medal – second place	4×100 m medley	3:33.66

On August 20, the first day of competition at the 2019 World Junior Championships in Budapest, Hungary, Matheny broke the National Age Group record for the boys 15–16 age group in the 100 meter breaststroke with a time of 1:00.66 that lowered the record set by Michael Andrew in 2015 by two-hundredths of a second. Later in the day, Matheny broke his own record with a time of 1:00.32 in the semifinals of the 100 meter breaststroke, advancing to the final ranking first overall. The next day, August 21, in the final of the 100 meter breaststroke Matheny broke his own record again, swimming a 1:00.17 to win the silver medal in the event only behind Vladislav Gerasimenko of Russia. Also on August 21, Matheny split a time of 59.31 seconds on the breaststroke leg of the 4×100 meter mixed medley relay for the United States, helping the relay win the gold medal and achieve a time of 3:44.84, which established new world junior and Championships records in the event.

Come the fourth day of competition, Matheny won his first individual gold medal of the competition in the 200 meter breaststroke with a personal best time of 2:09.40, breaking his own National Age Group record by almost two seconds and setting a new Championships record, which broke the former Championships record set in 2015 by Anton Chupkov of Russia. The sixth and final day of competition, August 25, Matheny swam a personal best time of 27.96 seconds in the final of the 50 meter breaststroke and placed fourth. In his last race of the Championships, Matheny helped the 4×100 meter medley relay finish in a time of 3:33.66 and win the silver medal by swimming his portion of the relay, 100 meters of breaststroke, in 59.55 seconds.

Following his success at the Championships, Matheny verbally committed to swimming collegiately for Indiana University beginning in the fall of 2021. Matheny's five National Age Group records between the US National Championships and the World Junior Championships earned him the Swammy Award from SwimSwam for the boys 15–16 "Age Group Swimmer of the Year".

=== 2020–2021 ===
At the 2020 Winter Junior National Championships in December, Matheny set a new National Age Group record for the boys 17–18 age group with a time of 1:51.38 in the 200 yard breaststroke, breaking the former record of 1:51.43 set by Reece Whitley in 2017. Additionally, he became the fifth American male swimmer aged 18 years old or younger to swim the event in less than one minute, fifty-two seconds flat, after Kevin Cordes in 2012, Andrew Seliskar in 2015, Reece Whitley in 2017, and Daniel Roy in 2018. For the 2020 year, Matheny was the only male American swimmer in the boys 17–18 age group to set a National Age Group record who was not competing in a collegiate program at the time of setting the record, an accomplishment that earned him the Swammy Award for "Age Group Swimmer of the Year" for the boys 17–18 age group for 2020.

==== 2020 US Olympic Trials ====
In June 2021, Matheny competed at his first US Olympic Trials, the 2020 US Olympic Trials in Omaha, Nebraska, which were postponed to 2021 due to the COVID-19 pandemic. He placed fifth in the final of the 100 meter breaststroke on June 14 with a time of 1:00.22. The day before, on June 13, Matheny swam a personal best time of 1:00.06 in the prelims heats of the 100 meter breaststroke. For his other event, the 200 meter breaststroke, Matheny placed 20th in the prelims heats on June 16 with a time of 2:13.88. He did not make the 2020 US Olympic Team in either of his events.

His performances at the Olympic Trials as well as winning multiple state championship titles in high school swimming earlier in his career, earned him the "Male Athlete of the Year" award for the 2021 year from both the Observer–Reporter and the Pittsburgh Post-Gazette. For the award from the Pittsburgh Post-Gazette, he was the first swimmer to win the accolade in the 42-year history of the award.

==== Collegiate career beginnings ====
Matheny started competing collegiately for the Indiana Hoosiers in the autumn of 2021, where he won the 200 yard breaststroke at one of his first college double dual meets in October, against both the Kentucky Wildcats and the Indiana State Sycamores, with a time of 2:00.69. At the 2021 Ohio State Fall Invitational in November, Matheny placed second in the 200 yard breaststroke with a time of 1:53.03 and third in the 100 yard breaststroke with a time of 52.24 seconds.

=== 2022 ===
==== 2022 Big Ten Championships ====
Swimming the breaststroke leg of the 4×50 yard medley relay in 23.43 seconds on the first day of the 2022 Big Ten Conference Championships in February, Matheny helped achieve a time of 1:22.51 and second-place finish. For the 200 yard individual medley the following day, he placed 26th with a time of 1:49.19 in the prelims heats. Later in the day, during the evening finals session, he split a 50.76 for the breaststroke leg of the 4×100 yard medley relay to help achieve a first-place finish in a Championships record time of 3:00.95. The third day of the Championships, Matheny swam a 52.13 in the prelims heats of the 100 yard breaststroke to qualify for the final ranking fifth, just 0.11 seconds behind the first-ranked swimmer. He swam a personal best time of 51.65 seconds in the final to finish in third-place, 0.98 seconds behind first-place finisher Max McHugh of the Minnesota Golden Gophers. The following, and final, day of competition, he qualified for the final of the 200 yard breaststroke ranking second with a time of 1:53.16 in the morning prelims heats. In the final of the 200 yard breaststroke, he improved upon his third-place finish in the 100 yard breaststroke this time taking second-place, only behind Max McHugh, with a personal best time of 1:50.65.

==== 2022 NCAA Championships ====
2022 NCAA Championships
Silver medal – second place	4×100 yd medley	3:00.76

On the first day of his first NCAA Championships, the 2022 NCAA Division I Championships in Atlanta in March, Matheny helped achieve a fifteenth-place finish in the 4×50 yard medley relay, swimming the breaststroke portion of the relay in 23.91 seconds. Day three of competition, he placed 29th in the prelims heats of the 100 yard breaststroke with a time of 52.56 seconds. In the evening finals session, he achieved his first podium-finish at an NCAA Championships, helping place second in the 4×100 yard medley relay in 3:00.76 with a split time of 50.93 seconds for the breaststroke leg of the relay. The final day of competition, he placed 32nd in the 200 yard breaststroke with a 1:54.51.

==== 2022 International Team Trials ====
At the 2022 US International Team Trials in Greensboro, North Carolina in late April, Matheny ranked eighth and qualified for the final of the 200 meter breaststroke with a time of 2:14.41 in the prelims heats on the morning of day two. He lowered his time to a 2:11.45 in the final to place sixth. The following day, he ranked tenth in the prelims heats of the 50 meter breaststroke, qualifying for the b-final with a time of 28.24 seconds. In the b-final he placed second, tenth overall, with a time of 28.15 seconds. The fourth day, he qualified for the b-final of the 100 meter breaststroke ranking 16th with a 1:02.14. He won the b-final with a time of 1:00.58. Three months later, he won the national title in the 100 meter breaststroke at the 2022 US National Championships, in Irvine, California, with a personal best time of 59.44 seconds.

=== 2023 ===
==== 2023 Big Ten Championships ====
In a dual meet against the Michigan Wolverines in January 2023 and leading up to the collegiate championships season, Matheny achieved a win in the 200 yard breaststroke with a time of 1:59.54. For the 100 yard breaststroke, he placed third with a finals time of 54.82 seconds. Starting his sophomore (second year) Big Ten Conference Championships on day two of competition, February 23, he helped win the conference title in the 4×100 yard medley relay with a Canham Natatorium pool record of 3:01.53 by swimming the 100 yard breaststroke portion of the relay in 50.77 seconds. He competed in two individual events on day three, first placing twenty-sixth in the 400 yard individual medley with a 3:53.69, then winning the bronze medal in the 100 yard breaststroke with a personal best time of 51.50 seconds in the final. Concluding the Championships on day four with the 200 yard breaststroke, he won the silver medal in a time of 1:51.23, finishing 1.03 seconds behind gold medalist Max McHugh, and contributing to an overall team title win for the Indiana Hoosiers.

==== 2023 NCAA Championships ====
2023 NCAA Championships
Silver medal – second place	4×100 yd medley	2:59.09

For his first of three events at the 2023 NCAA Division I Championships in March in Minneapolis, Minnesota, Matheny swam a personal best time in the preliminaries of the 100 yard breaststroke on day three of four with a 51.17 and qualified for his first b-final in an individual event at an NCAA Division I Championships. In the evening final, he further improved his personal best time to 50.99 seconds and won the b-final. For his second event, the 4×100 yard medley relay later in the same session, he split a 50.23 for the breaststroke leg of the relay to help win the silver medal in a new men's Indiana Hoosiers swim program record time of 2:59.09. Day four of four, he ranked sixth in the preliminaries of his third and final event, the 200 yard breaststroke, qualifying for the first a-final in an individual event at an NCAA Division I Championships of his career with a time of 1:51.24. In the evening final, he placed fourth in a personal best time of 1:50.12, finishing 3.21 seconds behind gold medalist Léon Marchand of the Arizona State Sun Devils.

== International championships ==
Meet	50 breaststroke	100 breaststroke	200 breaststroke	4×100 medley	4×100 mixed medley
WJC 2019	4th	2nd place, silver medalist(s)	1st place, gold medalist(s)	2nd place, silver medalist(s)	1st place, gold medalist(s)

== Personal best times ==
=== Long course meters (50 m pool) ===
Event	Time	Meet	Location	Date	Ref
50 m breaststroke	27.96	2019 World Junior Championships	Budapest, Hungary	August 25, 2019	
100 m breaststroke	59.44	2022 US National Championships	Irvine, California	July 29, 2022	
200 m breaststroke	2:09.40	2019 World Junior Championships	Budapest, Hungary	August 23, 2019	

=== Short course yards (25 yd pool) ===
Event	Time		Meet	Location	Date	Ref
100 yd breaststroke	50.99	b	2023 NCAA Division I Championships	Minneapolis, Minnesota	March 24, 2023	
200 yd breaststroke	1:50.12		2023 NCAA Division I Championships	Minneapolis, Minnesota	March 25, 2023	

Legend: b – b-final

== World records ==
=== World junior records ===
==== Long course meters ====
No.	Event	Time	Meet	Location	Date	Age	Status	Ref
1	4x100 m mixed medley relay	3:44.84	2019 World Junior Championships	Budapest, Hungary	August 21, 2019	16	Current	

== National age group records ==
=== Long course meters ===
No.	Event	Time		Meet	Location	Date	Age	Age Group	Ref
1	200 m breaststroke	2:11.02		2019 US National Championships	Stanford, California	August 1, 2019	16	15–16	
2	100 m breaststroke	1:00.66	h	2019 World Junior Championships	Budapest, Hungary	August 20, 2019	16	15–16	
3	100 m breaststroke (2)	1:00.32	sf	2019 World Junior Championships	Budapest, Hungary	August 20, 2019	16	15–16	
4	100 m breaststroke (3)	1:00.17		2019 World Junior Championships	Budapest, Hungary	August 21, 2019	16	15–16	
5	200 m breaststroke (2)	2:09.40		2019 World Junior Championships	Budapest, Hungary	August 23, 2019	16	15–16	

Legend: h – heat; sf – semifinal

=== Short course yards ===
No.	Event	Time	Meet	Location	Date	Age	Age Group	Ref
1	200 yd breaststroke	1:51.38	2020 Winter Junior National Championships	Carlisle, Pennsylvania	December 10, 2020	18	17–18	

== Awards and honors ==
- Observer–Reporter, Male Athlete of the Year: 2021
- Pittsburgh Post-Gazette, Male Athlete of the Year: 2021
- SwimSwam Swammy Award, Age Group Swimmer of the Year (boys 17–18): 2020
- SwimSwam Swammy Award, Age Group Swimmer of the Year (boys 15–16): 2019
- SwimSwam, Weekly Wonders of Age Group Swimming: July 23, 2014
