= 2022 FINA World Swimming Championships (25 m) – Men's 100 metre butterfly =

Swimming competition

Men's 100 metre butterfly at the 2022 FINA World Swimming Championships (25 m)
- Venue: Melbourne Sports and Aquatic Centre
- Location: Melbourne, Australia
- Dates: 17 December (heats and semifinals); 18 December (final)
- Competitors: 55 from 53 nations
- Winning time: 48.59

Medalists
gold medal	Chad le Clos	South Africa
silver medal	Ilya Kharun	Canada
bronze medal	Marius Kusch	Germany

The Men's 100 metre butterfly competition of the 2022 FINA World Swimming Championships (25 m) was held on 17 and 18 December 2022.

== Records ==
Prior to the competition, the existing world and championship records were as follows.

World record	Caeleb Dressel (USA)	47.78	Budapest, Hungary	November 21, 2020
Competition record	Chad le Clos (RSA)	48.08	Windsor, Canada	8 December 2016

== Results ==
=== Heats ===
The heats were started on 17 December at 12:16.

Rank	Heat	Lane	Name	Nationality	Time	Notes
1	6	4	Noè Ponti	Switzerland	48.81	Q, NR
2	7	4	Matteo Rivolta	Italy	49.43	Q
3	6	5	Youssef Ramadan	Egypt	49.64	Q
4	7	2	Ilya Kharun	Canada	49.66	Q, NR
5	7	3	Matthew Temple	Australia	49.85	Q
6	8	4	Chad le Clos	South Africa	49.88	Q
7	8	5	Marius Kusch	Germany	49.89	Q
8	8	6	Simon Bucher	Austria	50.06	Q
9	6	2	Yuya Sakamoto	Japan	50.09	Q
10	7	6	Yuya Tanaka	Japan	50.22	Q
11	8	3	Jakub Majerski	Poland	50.30	Q
12	8	8	Jan Šefl	Czech Republic	50.44	Q, NR
13	8	1	Shaun Champion	Australia	50.54	Q
14	7	8	Daniel Zaitsev	Estonia	50.55	Q
15	7	5	Nyls Korstanje	Netherlands	50.59	Q
16	5	3	Adilbek Mussin	Kazakhstan	50.64	Q, NR
17	5	2	Mario Mollà	Spain	50.67	
18	8	7	Chen Juner	China	50.83	
19	6	1	José Ángel Martínez	Mexico	51.06	
20	6	7	Nikola Miljenić	Croatia	51.16	
21	5	6	Oskar Hoff	Sweden	51.28	
22	5	7	Ádám Halás	Slovakia	51.34	NR
23	6	8	Leonardo Coelho Santos	Brazil	51.35	
24	4	2	Yang Jae-hoon	South Korea	51.36	NR
25	5	5	Wang Kuan-hung	Chinese Taipei	51.39	
26	5	8	Cameron Gray	New Zealand	51.69	
27	7	7	Antani Ivanov	Bulgaria	51.70	
28	4	6	Javier Matta	Peru	51.77	NR
29	4	8	Jesse Ssegonzi	Uganda	51.90	NR
30	5	4	Michael Andrew	United States	51.93	
31	5	1	Ng Cheuk Yin	Hong Kong	51.94	
32	4	1	Eldor Usmonov	Uzbekistan	52.19	
32	4	3	Navaphat Wongcharoen	Thailand	52.19	NR
34	4	7	Abeku Jackson	Ghana	52.36	NR
35	6	6	Ümitcan Güreş	Turkey	52.94	
36	4	5	Mehrshad Afghari	Iran	52.95	
37	3	4	Steven Aimable	Senegal	53.08	NR
38	3	3	Carlos Vásquez	Honduras	53.36	NR
39	3	5	Ben Hockin	Paraguay	53.87	
40	3	2	Tomàs Lomero	Andorra	54.01	NR
41	1	4	Isaia Aleksenko	Northern Mariana Islands	54.55	
42	3	6	Denzel González	Dominican Republic	54.90	
43	3	7	Collins Saliboko	Tanzania	55.85	
44	2	3	Salem Sabt	United Arab Emirates	55.95	
45	2	4	Aidan Carroll	Gibraltar	56.02	NR
46	2	8	James Hendrix	Guam	56.08	
47	3	1	Xavier Ventura	El Salvador	56.38	
48	1	5	Batbayaryn Enkhtamir	Mongolia	57.02	NR
49	2	5	Paolo Priska	Albania	57.30	
50	3	8	Finau Ohuafi	Tonga	57.66	
51	2	6	Abdulhai Ashour	Libya	1:00.26	
52	1	3	Kinley Lhendup	Bhutan	1:00.99	
53	2	2	Simanga Dlamini	Eswatini	1:03.90	
54	2	1	Shawn Dingilius-Wallace	Palau	1:05.18	
55	2	7	ElhadjN'Gnane Diallo	Guinea	1:05.58	
	4	4	Finlay Knox	Canada	Did not start	
	6	3	Szebasztián Szabó	Hungary	Did not start	
	7	1	Shaine Casas	United States	Did not start	

=== Semifinals ===
The semifinals were started on 17 December at 20:22.

Rank	Heat	Lane	Name	Nationality	Time	Notes
1	1	3	Chad le Clos	South Africa	48.98	Q
2	1	4	Matteo Rivolta	Italy	49.07	Q
2	2	4	Noè Ponti	Switzerland	49.07	Q
4	2	6	Marius Kusch	Germany	49.20	Q
5	1	5	Ilya Kharun	Canada	49.65	Q, NR
6	1	6	Simon Bucher	Austria	49.72	Q
7	2	3	Matthew Temple	Australia	49.73	Q
8	2	5	Youssef Ramadan	Egypt	49.79	Q
9	2	7	Jakub Majerski	Poland	49.86	
10	2	2	Yuya Sakamoto	Japan	50.16	
11	1	2	Yuya Tanaka	Japan	50.21	
12	1	1	Daniel Zaitsev	Estonia	50.48	NR
13	2	1	Shaun Champion	Australia	50.56	
14	2	8	Nyls Korstanje	Netherlands	50.59	
15	1	8	Adilbek Mussin	Kazakhstan	50.76	
16	1	7	Jan Šefl	Czech Republic	51.03	

=== Final ===
The final was held on 18 December at 19:42.

Rank	Lane	Name	Nationality	Time	Notes
1st place, gold medalist(s)	4	Chad le Clos	South Africa	48.59	
2nd place, silver medalist(s)	2	Ilya Kharun	Canada	49.03	WJ, NR
3rd place, bronze medalist(s)	6	Marius Kusch	Germany	49.12	
4	3	Noè Ponti	Switzerland	49.25	
5	5	Matteo Rivolta	Italy	49.32	
6	7	Simon Bucher	Austria	49.39	NR
7	1	Matthew Temple	Australia	49.67	
8	8	Youssef Ramadan	Egypt	49.84	
