= Max McHugh =

American swimmer (born 1999)

Personal information
- Full name: Maxwell McHugh
- Born: 1999 Sturgeon Bay, Wisconsin, U.S.

Sport
- Sport: Swimming
- Strokes: Breaststroke
- College team: University of Minnesota
Medal record
Men's swimming
Representing the Minnesota Golden Gophers
Event	1st	2nd	3rd
NCAA Championships	4	2	2
Total	4	2	2
By race
Event	1st	2nd	3rd
100 y breaststroke	3	0	1
200 y breaststroke	1	2	1
Total	4	2	2
NCAA Championships
Gold medal – first place	2021 Greensboro	100 y breaststroke
Gold medal – first place	2021 Greensboro	200 y breaststroke
Gold medal – first place	2022 Atlanta	100 y breaststroke
Gold medal – first place	2023 Minneapolis	100 y breaststroke
Silver medal – second place	2019 Austin	200 y breaststroke
Silver medal – second place	2022 Atlanta	200 y breaststroke
Bronze medal – third place	2019 Austin	100 y breaststroke
Bronze medal – third place	2023 Minneapolis	200 y breaststroke

Maxwell McHugh (born 1999) is an American former competitive swimmer specializing in breaststroke events. In 2021, he won two NCAA Division I titles at the year's championships, one in the 100 yard breaststroke and one in the 200 yard breaststroke. At the 2022 NCAA Division I Championships, he won the NCAA title in the 100 yard breaststroke. In 2023, he won a third-consecutive title in the 100 yard breaststroke at the NCAA Division I Championships for the year. He competed collegiately for the Minnesota Golden Gophers.

== Background ==
McHugh graduated from Sevastopol High School in Sturgeon Bay, Wisconsin where he competed scholastically as part of the high school team and set a National Age Group record, overall national high school record, and national public high school record in the 100 yard breaststroke with a time of 51.62 seconds at the 2018 Wisconsin State High School Championships. In 2018, he started attending the University of Minnesota where he majored in psychology and competed collegiately as part of the Minnesota Golden Gophers swim team. In the summer of 2019, he was a survivor in a drive-by shooting, receiving a bullet to his right leg and recovering from the wound to return and continue competing collegiately.

McHugh has an older brother, Conner McHugh, who is also a competitive swimmer specializing in breaststroke events and who swam collegiately for the Minnesota Golden Gophers.

== Career ==
=== 2018–2020 collegiate seasons ===
2019 NCAA Championships
Silver medal – second place	200 yd breaststroke	1:49.41
Bronze medal – third place	100 yd breaststroke	50.52

In his freshman (first) year, McHugh won the silver medal in the 100 yard breaststroke (51.08 seconds) and the 200 yard breaststroke (1:52.40), a bronze medal in the 4×100 yard medley relay (3:05.46), placed fifth in the 4×50 yard medley relay (1:24.62), and thirtieth in the 200 yard individual medley with a 1:48.25 at the 2019 Big Ten Conference Championships. Following his performances, he was named the 2019 Big Ten Conference men's freshman swimmer of the year.

Later in March, McHugh won the bronze medal in the 100 yard breaststroke at the 2019 NCAA Division I Men's Swimming and Diving Championships in Austin, Texas with a time of 50.52 seconds in the final after swimming a personal best time of 50.30 seconds in the prelims heats. For the 200 yard breaststroke, he won the silver medal in 1:49.41, finishing 0.71 seconds behind the first-place finisher in the event Andrew Seliskar of the California Golden Bears. In the 4×100 yard medley relay, he helped place tenth in a time of 3:04.70. For the 4×50 yard medley relay, he split a 23.01 for the breaststroke leg of the relay to help place seventeenth with a time of 1:24.85.

The following year, McHugh competed at the 2020 Big Ten Conference Championships in February in Bloomington, Indiana, winning the gold medal in the 100 yard breaststroke with a pool record time of 50.67 seconds and becoming the most recent male Minnesota Golden Gopher winner in the event at a Big Ten Championships since 2009. He also won the bronze medal in the 200 yard breaststroke, where he finished in 1:51.80 in the final. For his other events, he placed fourth in the 4×100 yard medley relay in 3:07.19, splitting a 50.77 for the breaststroke leg, placed seventh in the 4×50 yard medley relay in 1:25.39, splitting a 22.99 for the breaststroke leg, and placed fortieth in the 50 yard freestyle with a time of 20.39 seconds. By the end of the NCAA Division I conference championships, Big Ten and other conference championships, his time of 50.67 ranked as fastest 100 yard breaststroke time heading into the 2020 NCAA Division I Championships. However, he was unable to compete at the 2020 NCAA Division I Men's Swimming and Diving Championships as they were canceled due to the COVID-19 pandemic.

=== 2020–2021 collegiate season ===
2021 NCAA Championships
Gold medal – first place	100 yd breaststroke	50.18
Gold medal – first place	200 yd breaststroke	1:49.02

Competing at the 2021 Big Ten Conference Championships in March 2021 in Columbus, Ohio, McHugh split a 22.40 for the breaststroke leg of the 4×50 yard medley relay, which was the fastest 50 yard breaststroke relay split in the history of the NCAA and contributed to an eighth-place finish in 1:25.40. He also won the conference title each in the 100 yard breaststroke (50.59 seconds) and the 200 yard breaststroke (1:50.93), placed sixth in the 4×100 yard medley relay (3:06.96, split of 50.09 for the breaststroke portion), eighth in the 4×50 yard freestyle relay (1:18.55, split of 19.63 for the third leg), eighth in the 4×100 yard freestyle relay (2:54.37, split of 43.71 for the third leg), and twenty-ninth in the 50 yard freestyle with a personal best time of 20.16 seconds.

Later in the month, McHugh won the NCAA title in the 100 yard breaststroke at the 2021 NCAA Division I Men's Swimming and Diving Championships with a personal best time of 50.18 seconds and became the first Minnesota Golden Gopher since 1964 to win an individual NCAA title. He also won the NCAA title in the 200 yard breaststroke where he swam a personal best time of 1:49.02 to achieve the first NCAA men's title in the event for the University of Minnesota. His performances earned him the Big Ten Conference honor of "Swimmer of the Year".

=== 2020 US Olympic Trials ===
At the 2020 US Olympic Trials in Omaha, Nebraska, and postponed to June 2021 due to the COVID-19 pandemic, McHugh swam a 59.93 in the prelims heats of the 100 meter breaststroke and qualified for the semifinals ranking fourth. In the semifinals later the same day, he lowered his time to a 59.68 and advanced ranking fifth to the final the following day. His times from the prelims and semifinals were both personal best times. For the final of the 100 meter breaststroke the next day, he tied for seventh-place with a time of 1:00.56. Two days later he competed in the prelims heats of the 200 meter breaststroke where he placed 21st overall with a time of 2:13.97. For the 2021 year, his time of 59.68 seconds ranked him in the top 30 performers in the long course 100 meter breaststroke. Later in the summer, in August at the 2021 Minnesota Senior State Championship, he won the 100 meter breaststroke with a personal best time of 59.57 seconds and the 200 meter breaststroke with a personal best time of 2:12.61 as well as swimming a personal best time of 27.25 seconds in a timed final for the 50 meter breaststroke.

=== 2021–2022 collegiate season ===
McHugh earned the honor of being team captain for his senior year competing with the Minnesota Golden Gophers. In a meet against three other colleges in January 2022, McHugh won the 100 yard breaststroke with a time of 50.58 seconds, which ranked him first overall in the NCAA for the season.

==== 2022 Big Ten Championships ====
In his first event of the 2022 Big Ten Conference Championships in February, the 4×50 yard medley relay, McHugh and his relay were disqualified in the final for more than one reaction time registering as negative in value, -0.01 seconds specifically. The second day, he was declared a false start, a form of disqualification, in the prelims heats of the 50 yard freestyle and was disqualified in the 4×100 yard medley relay when a swimmer other than McHugh registered a negative reaction time, -0.10 seconds by the butterfly swimmer. Pre-relay disqualification, he split a 50.51 for the breaststroke leg of the relay, which was the fastest breaststroke split out of all the finals relays. On day three, he ranked third in the prelims heats of the 100 yard breaststroke with a time of 52.06 seconds and advanced to the final. He won the final with a time of 50.67 seconds, breaking the pool record of 51.54 seconds set by Ian Finnerty of the Indiana Hoosiers in 2018. He swam a 1:52.92 in the prelims heats of the 200 yard breaststroke on the fourth day, qualifying ranked first for the final with a time 0.24 seconds ahead of second-ranked swimmer Josh Matheny of the Indiana Hoosiers. Finishing the Championships with the 200 yard breaststroke, he concluded his senior collegiate conference championships by defending his title in the event from the 2021 Championships, finishing first in 1:49.45 and 1.20 seconds ahead of second-place finisher and freshman Josh Matheny. His time of 1:49.45 set a new Championships record, lowering the former record set by Ian Finnerty in 2019 with a 1:50.30 by 0.85 seconds.

Following his performances, swimming news outlet SwimSwam reported McHugh planned to compete for a fifth year in the collegiate system, the 2022–2023 season, which would help make it possible for him to compete in a typical four NCAA Championships in his collegiate career as the 2020 NCAA Division I Men's Swimming and Diving Championships were canceled during his sophomore (second) year competing for the NCAA.

==== 2022 NCAA Championships ====
2022 NCAA Championships
Gold medal – first place	100 yd breaststroke	49.90
Silver medal – second place	200 yd breaststroke	1:48.76

On the third day of the 2022 NCAA Division I Championships in Atlanta in March, McHugh swam a personal best time of 49.95 seconds in the prelims heats of the 100 yard breaststroke, qualifying for the final ranking first, setting a new pool record, and becoming the second American to swim the event faster than 50.00 seconds, only after Ian Finnerty. He lowered his pool record with another personal best time in the final, winning the NCAA title with a 49.90. On the fourth and final day, he ranked second across all prelims heats of the 200 yard breaststroke with a 1:50.31 and advanced to the evening final. In the 200 yard breaststroke final, he placed second with a personal best time of 1:48.76 behind Léon Marchand of the Arizona State Sun Devils.

Later in the year, in July at the 2022 Minnesota Sectionals conducted in long course meters, McHugh won the 100 meter breaststroke with a time of 1:01.60, the 200 meter breaststroke with a 2:18.40, and swam a 27.71 for the 50 meter breaststroke in a time trial.

=== 2022–2023 collegiate season ===
For his fifth-year senior year with the Minnesota Golden Gophers, McHugh was named team captain. At the final Last Chance Meet of his collegiate year, held in February 2023 of his fifth year, he earned an NCAA 'B' cut time of 51.56 seconds in the 100 yard breaststroke.

==== 2023 Big Ten Championships ====
Approximately two weeks later, on the first day of the 2023 Big Ten Conference Championships, McHugh split a 22.57 for the breaststroke leg of the 4×50 yard medley relay to help place sixth in 1:24.21. The relay's time lowered the Minnesota Golden Gophers men's swim program record in the event by 0.04 seconds. Improving relay placing to fourth in the final of the 4×100 yard medley relay the following day, he contributed a 50.61 for the breaststroke leg to a final mark of 3:07.01. The relay time registered as the fastest for the school in the NCAA season. On the third evening, he won the gold medal in the 100 yard breaststroke in a Canham Natatorium record time of 50.80 seconds, finishing as the only swimmer faster than 51 seconds. With his win he became the second man in the history of the Big Ten Conference to win four-consecutive titles in the 100 yard breaststroke, after Ian Finnerty. The final day, he won his third-consecutive title in the 200 yard breaststroke with a time of 1:50.20, marking the third-consecutive year he won all the individual breaststroke events at the Men's Big Ten Conference Championships and setting a new school program record for the total number of individual conference titles won by any one male Golden Gophers swimmer over the course of their collegiate career at seven titles, which increased the record count by one from the previous record of six titles set in the 1960s by Steve Jackman.

==== 2023 NCAA Championships ====
2023 NCAA Championships
Gold medal – first place	100 yd breaststroke	50.00
Bronze medal – third place	200 yd breaststroke	1:49.91

In March, at the 2023 NCAA Division I Championships hosted by his school, McHugh improved upon his split time in the 4×50 yard medley relay from the 2023 Big Ten Championships, lowering his time to a 22.39 to help place nineteenth overall with a time of 1:23.43. The relay time of 1:23.42 set a new program record and his split time of 22.39 briefly ranked as the fastest in NCAA history before being overtaken by Léon Marchand with a 22.27 in a later finals heat. On the third day, he won the fourth NCAA individual title of his collegiate career and third-consecutive title in the 100 yard breaststroke, finishing first by 0.60 seconds with a time of 50.00 seconds. His win made him the fifth male Minnesota Golden Gopher to win four individual NCAA titles in any sport and the most recent male swimmer from any university to win at least three consecutive NCAA Division I titles in the 100 yard breaststroke since Kevin Cordes of the Arizona Wildcats, who won four titles between 2012 and 2015, inclusive. For the final event of his collegiate career at his fourth NCAA Division I Championships (the 2020 NCAA Division I Championships were canceled due to the COVID-19 pandemic), the 200 yard breaststroke, he won the bronze medal with a time of 1:49.91, finishing 3.00 seconds behind gold medalist Léon Marchand who set new a new NCAA record.

== Collegiate championships (25 yd) ==
Meet	50 free	100 breast	200 breast	200 medley	4×50 free	4×100 free	4×50 medley	4×100 medley
Big Ten 2019		2nd place, silver medalist(s)	2nd place, silver medalist(s)	30th			5th	3rd place, bronze medalist(s)
NCAA DI 2019		3rd place, bronze medalist(s)	2nd place, silver medalist(s)				17th	10th
Big Ten 2020	40th	1st place, gold medalist(s)	3rd place, bronze medalist(s)				7th	4th
NCAA DI 2020	Not held due to the COVID-19 pandemic							
Big Ten 2021	29th	1st place, gold medalist(s)	1st place, gold medalist(s)		8th	8th	8th	6th
NCAA DI 2021		1st place, gold medalist(s)	1st place, gold medalist(s)					
Big Ten 2022	DSQ	1st place, gold medalist(s)	1st place, gold medalist(s)				DSQ	DSQ
NCAA DI 2022		1st place, gold medalist(s)	2nd place, silver medalist(s)					
Big Ten 2023		1st place, gold medalist(s)	1st place, gold medalist(s)				6th	4th
NCAA DI 2023		1st place, gold medalist(s)	3rd place, bronze medalist(s)				19th	

== Personal best times ==
=== Long course meters (50 m pool) ===
Event	Time	Meet	Location	Date	Ref
50 m breaststroke	27.25	2021 Minnesota Senior State Championship	Minneapolis, Minnesota	July 29, 2021	
100 m breaststroke	59.57	2021 Minnesota Senior State Championship	Minneapolis, Minnesota	July 30, 2021	
200 m breaststroke	2:12.61	2021 Minnesota Senior State Championship	Minneapolis, Minnesota	July 31, 2021	

=== Short course yards (25 yd pool) ===
Event	Time	Meet	Location	Date	Ref
50 yd freestyle	20.16	2021 Big Ten Conference Championships	Columbus, Ohio	March 3, 2021	
100 yd breaststroke	49.90	2022 NCAA Division I Championships	Atlanta, Georgia	March 25, 2022	
200 yd breaststroke	1:48.76	2022 NCAA Division I Championships	Atlanta, Georgia	March 26, 2022	

== Awards and honors ==
- Big Ten Conference, Swimmer of the Year (Men's): 2021
- Big Ten Conference, Freshman of the Year (Men's, swimming): 2019
- SwimSwam, Swim of the Week: January 29, 2021
- Big Ten Conference, Swimmer of the Week (Men's): October 30, 2019, November 13, 2019, December 11, 2019, January 27, 2021, February 10, 2021, December 8, 2021, February 2, 2022
- Big Ten Conference, Freshman of the Week (Men's): January 16, 2019, January 23, 2019, February 6, 2019
