= Youssef Ramadan =

Egyptian swimmer

Personal information
- Native name: يوسف رمضان
- Nationality: Egypt
- Born: 7 July 2002 (age 24) Cairo, Egypt

Sport
- Sport: Swimming
- College team: Virginia Tech
Medal record
Men's swimming
Representing the Virginia Tech Hokies
Event	1st	2nd	3rd
NCAA Championships	1	0	1
Total	1	0	1
By race
Event	1st	2nd	3rd
100 y butterfly	1	0	1
Total	1	0	1
NCAA Championships
Gold medal – first place	2023 Minneapolis	100 y butterfly
Bronze medal – third place	2022 Atlanta	100 y butterfly
Mediterranean Games
Bronze medal – third place	2026 Taranto	100 m butterfly

Youssef Ramadan (Arabic: يوسف رمضان; born 7 July 2002) is an Egyptian swimmer. He is an African record holder in the short course 4×50 metre medley relay and 4×100 metre medley relay, where he swam butterfly leg on both relays. He competed at the 2020 Summer Olympics in the 100 metre butterfly, placing sixteenth in the semifinals. At the 2021 World Short Course Championships, he placed fourth in the 100 metre butterfly and thirteenth in the 100 metre freestyle. At the 2022 World Short Course Championships, he placed eighth in the final of the 100 metre butterfly and tenth in the semifinals of the 100 metre freestyle and the 50 metre butterfly. In 2023, he won the NCAA Division I Championships title in the 100 yard butterfly.

== Background ==
Ramadan attended the New Cairo British International School in Cairo, Egypt, for high school. He started attending Virginia Tech and competing collegiately as part of the Virginia Tech Hokies swim team in the autumn of 2020 as an 18-year-old. He is sponsored by Hassan Allam Properties.

== Career ==
=== 2019 World Junior Championships ===
When he was 17 years old, Ramadan placed 11th in the semifinals of the 50 metre butterfly with a 24.13 and 16th in the semifinals of the 100 metre freestyle in 50.80 seconds at the 2019 World Junior Championships, held at Danube Arena in Budapest, Hungary in August 2019.

=== 2020 Olympic Games ===
At the 2020 Summer Olympics in Tokyo, Japan, and postponed to 2021 due to the COVID-19 pandemic, 19-year-old Ramadan set an Egyptian record in the prelims heats of the 100 metre butterfly with a time of 51.67 seconds, which qualified him for the semifinals tied in rank for fourteenth overall in the prelims heats with Szebasztián Szabó of Hungary. In the semifinals, Ramadan placed sixteenth with a time of 52.27 seconds and did not qualify for the final.

=== 2021 World Short Course Championships ===
At the 2021 FINA World Short Course Swimming Championships in Abu Dhabi, United Arab Emirates, Ramadan won his prelims heats of the 100 metre butterfly with a personal best time of 49.66 seconds and advanced to semifinals ranked third overall, six-hundredths of a second slower than second-ranked Andrei Minakov of Russia and seventeen-hundredths of a second slower than first-ranked Noè Ponti of Switzerland. In the event's semifinals later the same day, Ramadan qualified for the final ranking third with a time of 49.60 seconds. One day earlier, Ramadan anchored the 4×100 metre freestyle relay with a 49.03, helping the Egypt relay team place thirteenth in an Egyptian record time of 3:18.49 and not qualifying the relay to the final. On the third day of competition, Ramadan placed fourth in the final of the 100 metre butterfly with an Egyptian record time of 49.50 seconds, finishing less than three-tenths of a second behind bronze medalist Andrei Minakov.

On the fifth day of competition, Ramadan helped the 4×50 metre medley relay place second in the first prelims heat, splitting a 22.37 for the butterfly leg of the relay to help finish behind the Russia relay team and ahead of the United States relay team with an African record time of 1:33.19, which qualified the relay for the final ranking second overall. In the same prelims session, Ramadan set a new Egyptian record in the 100 metre freestyle with a time of 46.98 seconds, which ranked him eighth overall and qualified him for the semifinals later in the day. Later in the day, Ramadan helped lower the African record to 1:32.56 and achieve a fifth-place finish in the 4×50 metre medley relay, splitting a 22.12 for the butterfly leg of the relay. For the semifinals of the 100 metre freestyle, Ramadan placed 13th with a 47.36 and did not advance to the final. On the morning of the sixth and final day, Ramadan split a 50.89 for the butterfly leg of the 4×100 metre medley relay in the prelims, contributing to an African record time of 3:30.83 and a twelfth-place ranking across all heats.

=== 2021–2022 Collegiate season ===
During a practice in January 2022 for the Virginia Tech Hokies his sophomore (second) year, Ramadan took part in a virtual challenge of sprinting 75 yards in different strokes wearing fins for his 75 yards. Ramadan swam butterfly, starting from a push-start and performing flip turns on each wall to achieve a time of 28.4 seconds. At a dual meet against Pennsylvania State University later in the month, Ramadan set two pool records at the Virginia Tech pool, one in the 100-yard butterfly, where he won in 45.34 seconds, and another as part of the 4×50 yard medley relay in 1:25.13, where he swam the backstroke leg of the relay in 21.93 seconds. In the first week of February, Ramadan won the 100-yard butterfly with a time of 44.68 seconds and competed in the 200-yard butterfly, achieving a time of 1:43.00, at the Virginia Tech Invitational.

==== 2022 ACC Championships ====
At the 2022 Atlantic Coast Conference, ACC, Championships in February 2022, Ramadan ranked fifth in the prelims heats of the 50-yard freestyle with a 19.13. For the final, Ramadan placed third in a time of 18.87 seconds, finishing 0.13 seconds behind first-place finisher David Curtiss. Earlier in the same finals session, he led off the 4×50 yard freestyle relay in 18.80 seconds to help achieve a fourth-place finish in the event in 1:16.29. In the prelims heats of the 100-yard butterfly on day three, Ramadan ranked fourth with a 45.39 and qualified for the final. Later in the day, Ramadan anchored the 4×50 yard medley relay in the final with an 18.53 to help achieve a second-place finish in 1:22.82. For his second and final event of the evening, Ramadan won the 100-yard butterfly in a new ACC Championships and ACC record time of 44.08 seconds, which made him the fourth-fastest swimmer to race the event in the United States and was just 0.07 seconds off the pool record of 44.01 set by Joseph Schooling in 2016. On day four, he split a 41.41 to anchor the 4×100 yard medley relay to a third-place finish in 3:02.71. Finishing in a time of 41.83 seconds in the prelims heats of the 100-yard freestyle on the fifth and final day, Ramadan ranked first, heading into the final. He won the final with a personal best time of 41.76 seconds, then finished the Championships with a third-place finish in the 4×100 yard freestyle relay in a final relay time of 2:48.03. His lead-off split time of 41.96 seconds was the second-fastest lead-off leg of all 11 finals relays. With his accomplishments at the Championships, Ramadan received the "Men's Most Valuable Swimmer" honour and helped achieve a third-place finish for the Virginia Tech men overall.

==== 2022 NCAA Championships ====
2022 NCAA Championships
Bronze medal – third place	100 yd butterfly	43.90

In March 2022, at the 2022 NCAA Division I Championships in Atlanta, United States, Ramadan helped achieve a tenth-place finish in the 4×50 yard medley relay on the first day of competition, splitting an 18.61 for the freestyle leg of the relay. The second day, he advanced to the final of the 50-yard freestyle, ranking fifth overall in the prelims heats with a personal best time of 18.79 seconds. Finishing in a time of 19.04 seconds in the final, he placed seventh less than half a second behind first-place finisher Brooks Curry. For his second event of the evening, he swam a 19.11, leading off the 4×50 yard freestyle relay to a tenth-place finish in 1:15.99. On the third day, he ranked second in the prelims heats of the 100-yard butterfly with a time of 44.21 seconds and qualified for the evening final. He placed third in the final with a personal best time of 43.90 seconds, finishing 0.19 seconds behind first-place finisher Andrei Minakov and 0.10 seconds behind second-place finisher Luca Urlando. In the 4×100 yard medley relay final, he split a 41.99 for the freestyle leg of the relay to help achieve a 17th-place finish in 3:05.18. The following day, the fourth and final day, he ranked fifteenth with a 41.80 in the prelims heats of the 100-yard freestyle, qualifying for the b-final in the evening. In the b-final, he swam a personal best time of 41.72 seconds to place fourth, which was eleventh-place overall and three-tenths of a second behind b-final winner Dean Farris. To conclude his competition, he led off the 4×100 yard freestyle relay with a 42.32 to help place tenth in 2:48.61.

=== 2022 World Aquatics Championships ===
Ramadan led off the 4×100 metre freestyle relay on the first day of pool swimming competition at the 2022 World Aquatics Championships with a time of 48.90 seconds, helping achieve a 15th-place finish in the preliminaries with a combined relay time of 3:19.46 and setting an Egyptian record in the 100 metre freestyle with his split time of 48.90 seconds. For the 100 metre butterfly, he swam a time of 52.42 seconds in the preliminaries, ranking two spots ahead of Kyle Chalmers of Australia and placing 20th.

=== 2022 Swimming World Cup ===
For his first-ever FINA Swimming World Cup stop, held in November at the Indiana University Natatorium in Indianapolis, United States as part of the 2022 FINA Swimming World Cup, Ramadan ranked ninth in the preliminary heats of the 100 metre butterfly with a time of 50.93 seconds, achieving first-reserve status for the final. Later in the morning session, he placed ninth in the 50 metre freestyle with a personal best time of 21.83 seconds. For the evening session, his first-reserve status for the final of the 100 metre butterfly was called upon after final-qualifier Luca Urlando withdrew from further competition. In the final, he placed sixth with a time of 50.51 seconds. The next day, he placed thirteenth in the 50 metre backstroke with a time of 24.07 seconds. He followed his performance up with a rank of ninth in the preliminary heats of the 100 metre freestyle with a time of 47.50 seconds.

On day three of three, Ramadan swam an Egyptian record and personal best time of 22.70 seconds in the preliminary heats of the 50 metre butterfly and qualified for the final ranking fourth. In the final, he lowered the Egyptian record and his personal best time to 22.63 seconds, placing sixth.

=== 2022 World Short Course Championships ===
At the 2022 World Short Course Championships, contested in December in Melbourne, Australia, Ramadan qualified for the semifinals of the 50 metre butterfly ranking fifteenth with an Egyptian record and personal best time of 22.50 seconds in the preliminaries. In the semifinals, he achieved another Egyptian record and personal best time to place tenth, finishing in 22.32 seconds. For the preliminaries session the following morning, he set a new Egyptian record in the 100 metre freestyle with a personal best time of 46.51 seconds and advanced to the semifinals ranked eighth. He placed tenth in the semifinals with a time of 46.57 seconds. On the morning of day five in the preliminaries of his final event, the 100 metre butterfly, he ranked third with a time of 49.64 seconds and qualified for the semifinals later in the day. In the semifinals, he earned a spot in the final with an eighth-rank time of 49.79 seconds. In the final, he placed eighth with a time of 49.84 seconds, which was 1.25 seconds behind gold medalist Chad le Clos of South Africa.

=== 2022–2023 Collegiate season ===
At the 2023 Virginia Tech Invitational in early February, Ramadan achieved a win in the 200 yard butterfly with a personal best time of 1:42.96 and set new pool records for two individual events, a 45.48 for the 100 yard backstroke and a 44.42 for the 100 yard butterfly.

==== 2023 ACC Championships ====
Splitting a 19.87 for the butterfly leg of the 4×50 yard medley relay at the 2023 Atlantic Coast Conference Championships in mid-February, Ramadan helped place sixth with a time of 1:24.36. The evening session of the second day, he led-off the 4×50 yard freestyle relay with a 19.00 to contribute to a final placing of fourth in a time of 1:16.15. He followed up with a time of 18.82 seconds in the final of the 50 yard freestyle to achieve a second-place finish and win the silver medal. The third evening, he won the conference title in the 100 yard butterfly with a time of 43.93 seconds, which was 0.73 seconds faster than the second-place finisher. His 43.93 marked the fastest time achieved in the event in the NCAA season. It also set a new pool record in the event for the Greensboro Aquatic Center. On day four, he swam a personal best time of 44.59 seconds for the backstroke leg of the 4×100 yard medley relay to help place fourth in a time of 3:03.40. His split time set a new Virginia Tech swim program record in the 100 yard backstroke, and the 3:03.40 ranked as the second-fastest for the school.

On the final night of competition, Ramadan won the conference title in the 100 yard freestyle with a personal best time of 41.33 seconds. In the 4×100 yard freestyle relay final later in the same session, he helped achieve a placing of second with a time of 2:48.06, swimming the lead-off leg of the relay in 42.00 seconds. He repeated as the "Men's Most Valuable Swimmer" for the Championships with his performances and helped the men's Virginia Tech Hokies team improve to an overall second-place amongst competing teams. It marked the highest placing for the men's swim program at an Atlantic Coast Conference Championships since 2014.

==== 2023 NCAA Championships ====
2023 NCAA Championships
Gold medal – first place	100 yd butterfly	43.15

At the 2023 NCAA Division I Championships in March in Minneapolis, United States, Ramadan started off with an overall placing of thirteenth in the 4×200 yard freestyle relay on day one, helping finish in 6:14.96 with a split of 1:33.21 for the second leg of the relay. The second finals session, he placed fifth in the 50 yard freestyle with a time of 18.82 seconds before leading off the 4×50 yard freestyle relay with a personal best and Virginia Tech Hokies record time of 18.68 seconds to contribute to an eighth-place finishing in a Virginia Tech Hokies record time of 1:15.67. The third evening, he won the NCAA title in the 100 yard butterfly with a personal best and Atlantic Coast Conference record time of 43.15 seconds, which ranked as the second-fastest time in NCAA history. It marked the first time in the history of the NCAA that a Virginia Tech Hokies male swimmer won an NCAA Division I Championships title in an individual event. Later in the session, he swam a 43.62 for the butterfly leg of the 4×100 yard medley relay, contributing to a new men's Virginia Tech Hokies record time of 3:02.53 that took seventh-place overall.

On the morning of the fourth and final day, Ramadan set a new program record in the 100 yard freestyle preliminaries with a personal best time of 41.15 seconds and qualified for the final ranking third overall. Swimming a 41.61 in the evening final, he placed eighth overall before leading-off the 4×100 yard freestyle relay later in the session with a 41.70 to help place tenth in a time of 2:48.34. The points allocated for his performances contributed to a score of 133 points for the Virginia Tech Hokies and the first top-ten (9th-place) finish at an NCAA Division I Men's Swimming and Diving Championships in the history of the men's swim program.

== International championships (50 m) ==
Meet	100 freestyle	50 butterfly	100 butterfly	4×100 freestyle
Junior level
WJC 2019	16th	11th		
Senior level
OG 2020		—N/a	16th	
WC 2022			20th	15th

== International championships (25 m) ==
Meet	100 freestyle	50 butterfly	100 butterfly	4×100 freestyle	4×50 medley	4×100 medley
WC 2021	13th		4th	13th	5th	12th
WC 2022	10th	10th	8th			

== Personal best times ==
=== Long course metres (50 m pool) ===
Event	Time		Meet	Location	Date	Age	Notes	Ref
100 m freestyle	48.90	h, r	2022 World Aquatics Championships	Budapest, Hungary	18 June 2022	19	NR	
50 m butterfly	23.68		2026 African Swimming Championship	Oran, Algeria	6 May 2026	24		
100 m butterfly	51.67	h	2020 Summer Olympics	Tokyo, Japan	29 July 2021	19	NR	

Legend: NR – Egyptian record; h – prelims heat; r – relay 1st leg

=== Short course metres (25 m pool) ===
Event	Time		Meet	Location	Date	Age	Notes	Ref
50 m freestyle	21.83	h	2022 FINA Swimming World Cup	Indianapolis, United States	3 November 2022	20		
100 m freestyle	46.51	h	2022 World Short Course Championships	Melbourne, Australia	14 December 2022	20	NR	
50 m butterfly	22.32	sf	2022 World Short Course Championships	Melbourne, Australia	13 December 2022	20	NR	
100 m butterfly	49.50		2021 World Short Course Championships	Abu Dhabi, United Arab Emirates	18 December 2021	19	NR	

Legend: NR – Egyptian record; h – prelims heat; sf – semifinal; † – en route to final mark

=== Short course yards (25 yd pool) ===
Event	Time		Meet	Location	Date	Age	Notes	Ref
50 yd freestyle	18.68	r	2023 NCAA Championships	Minneapolis, United States	23 March 2023	20		
100 yd freestyle	41.15	h	2023 NCAA Championships	Minneapolis, United States	25 March 2023	20		
100 yd backstroke	44.59	r	2023 ACC Championships	Greensboro, United States	17 February 2023	20		
100 yd butterfly	43.15		2023 NCAA Championships	Minneapolis, United States	24 March 2023	20	ACC	
200 yd butterfly	1:42.96		2023 Virginia Tech Invitational	Christiansburg, United States	5 February 2023	20		

Legend: ACC – Atlantic Coast Conference record; h – prelims heat; r – relay 1st leg

== Continental records ==
=== Short course metres (25 m pool) ===
No.	Event	Time		Meet	Location	Date	Age	Status	Ref
1	4×50 m medley relay	1:33.19	h	2021 World Short Course Championships	Abu Dhabi, United Arab Emirates	20 December 2021	19	Former	
2	4×50 m medley relay (2)	1:32.56		2021 World Short Course Championships	Abu Dhabi, United Arab Emirates	20 December 2021	19	Current	
3	4×100 m medley relay	3:30.83	h	2021 World Short Course Championships	Abu Dhabi, United Arab Emirates	21 December 2021	19	Current	

Legend: h – prelims heat

== Awards and honours ==
- Atlantic Coast Conference (ACC), Most Valuable Swimmer (Men's): 2022 ACC Championships, 2023 ACC Championships
- Atlantic Coast Conference (ACC), Swimmer of the Week (male): 18 January 2022, 4 October 2022
