= Tomer (name) =

Tomer is a Hebrew given name, usually masculine. Notable people with the name include:

- Tomer Bar (born 1969), Commander of the Israeli Air Force
- Tomer Capone (born 1985), Israeli film and television actor
- Tomer Chencinski (born 1984), Israeli-Canadian football player
- Tomer Elbaz (born 1989), Israeli football player
- Tomer Eliyahu (born 1975), Israeli football player
- Tomer Frankel (born 2000), Israeli swimmer, European 2018 junior champion in the 100 m freestyle
- Tomer Ganihar (born 1970), Israeli photographer
- Tomer Ginat (born 1994), Israeli MVP basketball player
- Tomer Haliva (born 1979), Israeli football player
- Tomer Hanuka (born 1974), Israeli artist
- Tomer Hemed (born 1987), Israeli football player
- Tomer Heymann (born 1970), Israeli filmmaker
- Tomer Shalom, Israeli professional wrestler
- Tomer Sharon (born 1970), Israeli actor, stand-up comedian and singer
- Tomer Sisley (born 1974), Israeli French actor and comedian
- Tomer Steinhauer (born 1966), Israeli basketball coach and former player
- Tomer Yosef (born 1975), Israeli singer
- Tomer Ben Yosef (born 1979), Israeli football player

== See also ==
- Tomer, Israeli settlement
- Tomer Devorah, Jewish philosophical text
- Tomar (surname)
