= Patrick Callan =

American swimmer (born 1999)

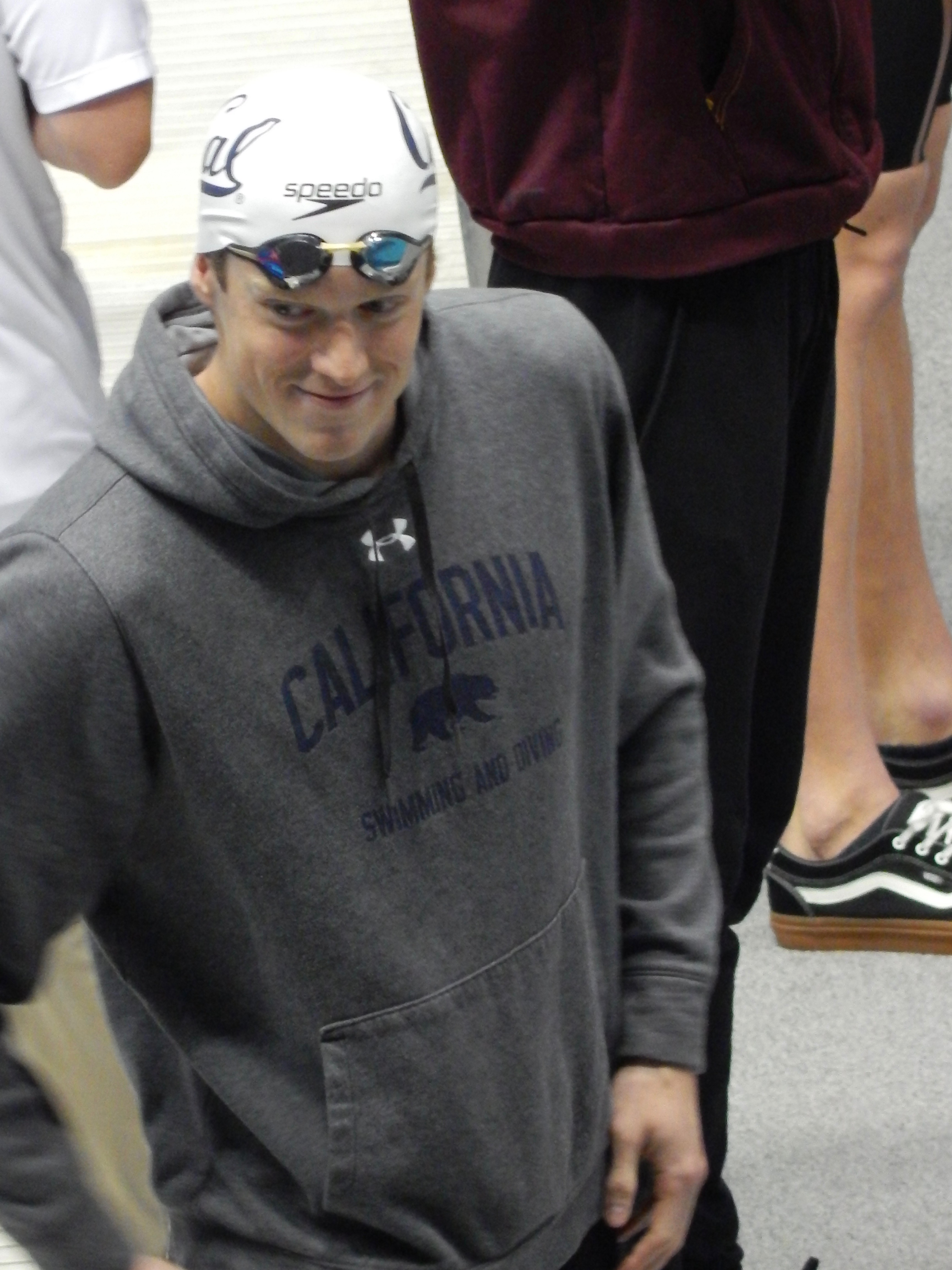
- Callan in 2023

Personal information
- Full name: Kevin Patrick Callan
- Nickname: Pat
- Nationality: United States
- Born: October 6, 1999 (age 27) Tulsa, Oklahoma, U.S.
- Height: 6 ft 2 in (188 cm)
- Weight: 190 lb (86 kg)

Sport
- Sport: Swimming
- Strokes: Freestyle
- College team: University of Michigan (undergraduate), University of California, Berkeley (graduate)
- Coach: Mike Bottom
Medal record
Men's swimming
Representing the United States
Event	1st	2nd	3rd
World Junior Championships	0	1	0
Total	0	1	0
World Junior Championships
Silver medal – second place	2017 Indianapolis	4×200 m freestyle
U.S. Open Championships
Silver medal – second place	2020 Virtual	200 m freestyle
Bronze medal – third place	2020 Virtual	400 m freestyle

Kevin Patrick Callan (born October 6, 1999) is a retired American competitive swimmer. In 2017, he won a silver medal in the 4×200-meter freestyle relay at the 2017 World Junior Championships. In 2020, he won silver medals in the 200-meter freestyle and the 400-meter freestyle at the year's U.S. Open Championships. At the 2020 Summer Olympics, Callan was part of the 4×200-meter freestyle relay that took fourth place. At the 2023 NCAA Division I Men's Swimming and Diving Championships, he won a bronze medal in the 4×200-yard freestyle relay. He has a younger brother, Christopher Jack Callan, who currently swims at the University of Michigan.

== Early life and education ==
Callan was born in Bartlesville, Oklahoma and raised in Tulsa, Oklahoma. He attended Bishop Kelley High School in Tulsa, graduating in 2018. Collegiately, he started competing for the University of Michigan Wolverines in autumn 2018 while pursuing studies for an undergraduate degree in business administration, graduating in 2022. In the autumn of 2022, he started pursuing a graduate degree at the University of California, Berkeley, where he competes as part of the California Golden Bears swim team via a fifth year of NCAA eligibility.

== Career ==
=== 2016–2021 ===
2017 World Junior Championships
Silver medal – second place	4×200 m freestyle relay	7:10.96

In June 2016, at the 2016 US Olympic Trials in Omaha, Nebraska, Callan competed in two events. He ranked 67th overall in the 200-meter freestyle and 87th overall in the 400-meter freestyle. He represented the United States at the 2017 World Junior Championships in Indianapolis, winning the silver medal in the 4×200-meter freestyle relay. Callan also placed fourth in the final of the 200-meter freestyle individual event.

==== 2020 US Olympic Trials ====
In November 2020, as part of preparation for the 2020 US Olympic Trials, held the following year due to the COVID-19 pandemic, Callan competed in the virtual format 2020 U.S. Open Swimming Championships, winning the silver medal in the 200-meter freestyle with a time of 1:47.38 and the bronze medal in the 400-meter freestyle with a time of 3:49.34. He placed sixth in the final of the 200-meter freestyle at the 2020 Olympic Team Trials in Omaha, Nebraska with a time of 1:46.49, qualifying him for the 2020 Olympic Games in the 4×200-meter freestyle relay.

==== 2020 Summer Olympics ====
Callan qualified for his first Olympic Games in the 4×200-meter freestyle relay at the 2020 Summer Olympics in Tokyo, Japan. His sixth place finish at the US Olympic Trials situated him as a relay-only prelims swimmer for the 4×200-meter freestyle relay heading into the 2020 Olympics. In the preliminaries of the 4×200-meter freestyle relay, Callan swam alongside Blake Pieroni, Drew Kibler, and Andrew Seliskar and the relay ranked fifth overall and advanced to the final. In the final, the relay finished fourth overall.

=== 2022 ===
==== 2022 Big Ten Championships ====
On the first day of the 2022 Big Ten Conference Championships in February, Callan achieved a second-place finish in 6:14.59 in the 4×200-yard freestyle relay, splitting a 1:34.03 for the lead-off leg of the relay. In the prelims heats of the 500-yard freestyle the following day, he ranked fourth with a 4:16.63 and advanced to the evening finals. For the final, he swam a 4:16.72 to place sixth. Day three, he ranked fifth in the prelims heats and qualified for the final of the 200 yard freestyle with his time of 1:34.27. He placed sixth in the final, swimming slightly faster than in the prelims heats with a time of 1:34.00. The fourth and final day, he swam a 43.98 in the prelims heats of the 100 yard freestyle, ranking 23rd overall, and in the final he earned two points for the Michigan Wolverines with a time of 44.05 seconds, overall 23rd rank, and seventh-place finish in the c-final.

Five days after the end of the Championships, Callan swam a 3:56.30 and placed fifth in the 400 meter freestyle at the 2022 Pro Swim Series in Westmont, Illinois. In the prelims heats of the 200 meter freestyle the following day, he qualified for the final ranking first with a 1:50.58. He placed fourth in the final with a time of 1:49.83, finishing 1.20 seconds behind fellow 2020 US Olympic team member Jake Mitchell.

==== 2022 NCAA Championships ====
Leading up to the 2022 NCAA Division I Championships following the Pro Swim Series in Westmont, Callan announced he was staying at the University of Michigan to compete the following collegiate season as a fifth year, also called a super senior. The first day of competition, he led-off the 4×200 yard freestyle relay in 1:33.10 to help achieve a fourteenth-place finish in 6:14.56. In the morning the following day, he swam a 4:16.44 in the 500 yard freestyle and placed 28th. In the prelims heats of the 200 yard freestyle on day three, he placed 22nd with a 1:33.14. For the 4×100 yard freestyle relay on the fourth and final day, he split a 43.02 for the third leg of the relay to help place 22nd in 2:52.27.

==== 2022 International Team Trials ====
On the second day of the 2022 US International Team Trials in Greensboro, North Carolina in April, Callan ranked 14th in the prelims heats of the 200 meter freestyle with a time of 1:48.76 and qualified for the evening b-final. He did not swim in the b-final. Two days later, he swam a 3:55.36 for the prelims heats of the 400 meter freestyle, qualifying for the b-final ranking 13th overall. He decided to not swim the event in the finals session.

==== 2022 Swimming World Cup ====
As part of his first FINA Swimming World Cup at the 2022 Swimming World Cup held in October in Toronto, Canada, Callan placed ninth in the 400 meter freestyle with a personal best time of 3:47.18. In the 200 meter freestyle two days later, he placed fourteenth in the preliminary heats with a personal best time of 1:45.93, which was 2.35 seconds slower than the fastest swimmer in the preliminary heats Matthew Sates of South Africa. One day prior, he placed twenty-sixth in the 100 meter freestyle with a personal best time of 49.72 seconds, which was 2.76 seconds behind the first-ranked swimmer in the preliminary heats Kyle Chalmers of Australia.

The following World Cup stop, held in his home county at the Indiana University Natatorium in Indianapolis, Callan placed nineteenth in the 400 meter freestyle on day one with a time of 3:49.14. On the third and final day, he swam a 1:46.88 in the 200 meter freestyle and placed twenty-fifth overall.

=== 2023 ===
For the final dual meet of his fifth year in the NCAA, where he represented the California Golden Bears in a duel meet against the Stanford Cardinal in February 2023, Callan competed in the 200-yard freestyle, finishing as the fastest California Golden Bear swimmer with a time of 1:34.40 to place third overall.

==== 2023 Pac-12 Championships ====
Leading off the 4×200 yard freestyle relay on day one of the 2023 Pac-12 Conference Championships, conducted at the King County Aquatic Center in Federal Way, Washington, Callan helped win the silver medal with a split time of 1:32.74 that contributed to the final relay time of 6:09.65. In his first individual event of the Championships the following day, the 500 yard freestyle on March 2, he placed fourth with a 4:12.45, finishing within a quarter of a second of the bronze medalist. His time ranked fifth all-time for the California Golden Bears men's swim program. In the 200-yard freestyle the following day, he tied for eighth-rank with a time of 1:33.79 in the preliminaries, qualified for a swim-off where he advanced to the b-final after finishing second out of two swimmers in the swim-off, and then placed fifth in the b-final, thirteenth overall, with a time of 1:34.54. On the final day, he placed eighteenth in the preliminaries of the 200 yard butterfly with a time of 1:46.81 before withdrawing from competition in the c-final.

==== 2023 NCAA Championships ====
2023 NCAA Championships
Bronze medal – third place	4×200 yd freestyle	6:06.41

Day one of the 2023 NCAA Division I Championships, held following the 2023 Pac-12 Championships in March in Minneapolis, Minnesota, Callan helped win the bronze medal in the 4×200 yard freestyle relay in a final time of 6:06.41, splitting a 1:33.63 for the third leg of the relay. The 6:06.41 set a new California Golden Bears men's swim program record in the event. In his two individual events he placed thirty-second in each, finishing in a time of 4:17.54 in the preliminaries of the 500 yard freestyle on day two and in a time of 1:33.59 in the preliminaries of the 200 yard freestyle on day three.

== International championships ==
Meet	200 freestyle	4×200 freestyle relay	4×100 medley relay
WJC 2017	4th	2nd place, silver medalist(s)	DSQ (2nd in heats)^{[a]}^{[b]}
OG 2020		4th^{[a]}	

^{a} Callan swam only in the prelims heats.
^{b} Callan was not a member of the finals relay that was disqualified.

== Personal best times ==
=== Long course meters (50 m pool) ===
Event	Time	Meet	Location	Date	Ref
200 m freestyle	1:46.49	2020 US Olympic Trials	Omaha, Nebraska	June 15, 2021	
400 m freestyle	3:49.34	2020 U.S. Open Swimming Championships	United States	November 13, 2020	

=== Short course meters (25 m pool) ===
Event	Time		Meet	Location	Date	Ref
100 m freestyle	49.72	h	2022 Swimming World Cup	Toronto, Canada	October 29, 2022	
200 m freestyle	1:45.93	h	2022 Swimming World Cup	Toronto, Canada	October 30, 2022	
400 m freestyle	3:47.18	h	2022 Swimming World Cup	Toronto, Canada	October 28, 2022	

Legend: h – preliminary heat
