= Tanwari =

Village in Rajasthan, India

Tanwari is a village in Sirohi district in Rajasthan state of India. it is located about 29 km west of Sirohi.Its name was Tobavati Nagari in the princely state of Rajputana. Here Rajput, Rajpurohit, Chaudhary, Rebari, Meghwal, Suthar, Lohar, Mali, along with other castes reside here, Thakur Shri Jabbar Singh Deora. Deora Rajputs reside here, whose Kuldev is Sarneshwar God. And the Rajpurohit here is Sepau and in the Rajpurohit caste here, Veer Shree Darjo singh rajpurohit became a Rajpurohit who fought against the high tax imposed on the common man. The temple of Mamaji and Rowada Thakur Sahib Sardulsihanji Deora is also situated here.There were rishi and rishiyani in Tavari, whose temple is present in Akariya and the Phuleshwar mat here is also famous and there is also a temple of Shri Hinglaj Bhavani here. The temple of Shiva Shakti is situated near the bus stand here. It is located 500m away from the village, Arobadi is situated there along with Mali caste, two houses of jagirdars are also located. Here the population of Chaudhary caste is 100+, more population in the village is of Chaudhary and Rebari caste. The main occupation of the village is agriculture and trade.
