= Andrew Capobianco =

American diver (born 1999)

Personal information
- Born: October 13, 1999 (age 26) Wantagh, New York, U.S.
- Home town: Holly Springs, North Carolina, U.S.
- Education: Holly Springs High School, Indiana University Bloomington
- Height: 5 ft 9 in (175 cm)
- Weight: 165 lb (75 kg)

Sport
- Country: United States
- Sport: Diving
- College team: Indiana University Bloomington
Medal record
Men's diving
Representing the United States
Olympic Games
Silver medal – second place	2020 Tokyo	3 m synchro
World Championships
Bronze medal – third place	2019 Gwangju	Mixed team
Pan American Games
Bronze medal – third place	2019 Lima	1 m springboard
Bronze medal – third place	2019 Lima	3 m synchro
Representing the Indiana Hoosiers
NCAA Championships
Gold medal – first place	2019 Austin	3 m diving
Gold medal – first place	2021 Greensboro	3 m diving
Gold medal – first place	2023 Minneapolis	3 m diving
Silver medal – second place	2022 Atlanta	1 m diving
Silver medal – second place	2022 Atlanta	3 m diving
Silver medal – second place	2023 Minneapolis	1 m diving
Bronze medal – third place	2018 Minneapolis	Platform

Andrew Capobianco (/ˌkæpoʊbiˈɑːŋkoʊ/ CAP-oh-bee-AHNG-koh; born October 13, 1999) is an American Olympic diver.

== Career ==
Capobianco attended Holly Springs High School in Holly Springs, North Carolina, where he was a two-time NCHSAA 4A state champion in 1 meter diving. He then attended and competed at Indiana University Bloomington, where he earned NCAA All-American honors twelve-times and NCAA national champion honors three times.

He participated at the 2019 World Aquatics Championships, winning a bronze medal.

In 2021, he qualified with his diving partner Michael Hixon for the U.S. Olympic Diving Team, to compete in the men's synchronised 3m springboard. Later during the Olympic Trials, he also qualified for the 2020 Summer Olympics in Tokyo in the Individual 3m dive.

At the Tokyo Summer Olympics, Capobianco and Hixon won the silver medal in the men's synchronised 3m springboard, while Capobianco finished 10th out of 12 divers in the finals of the individual 3m springboard, from an original field of 29 in the competition.
