= Jan Eric Friese =

German swimmer

Personal information
- Nationality: German
- Born: 1 August 1999 (age 26) Potsdam, Germany

Sport
- Sport: Swimming
- College team: University of Florida

Jan Eric Friese (born 1 August 1999) is a German swimmer. He competed in the men's 4 × 100 metre freestyle relay at the 2020 Summer Olympics.
