= Tomar (Jat clan) =

Indian clan

Tomar is a Jat clan found primarily in the Indian state of Uttar Pradesh (mostly in Baghpat district).
