= Tomar (surname) =

Tomar is a surname of Indian origin. Notable people with the surname include:

- Abhijeet Tomar (born 1995), Indian cricketer
- Alka Tomar, Indian wrestler
- Anangpal Tomar (11th century), Indian ruler
- Baldev Singh Tomar (born 1970), Indian politician
- Brijesh Tomar (born 1978), Indian cricketer
- Chandro Tomar (1932–2021), Indian octogenarian sharpshooter
- Dave Tomar, known as Ed Dante, American writer
- Dharmesh Singh Tomar, Indian politician
- Harshita Tomar (born 2002), Indian sailor
- Jitender Singh Tomar (born 1966), Indian politician
- Lajja Ram Tomar (1930–2004), Indian educationist
- Man Singh Tomar, Indian ruler of Gwalior
- Mukta Dutta Tomar (born 1961), Indian civil servant
- Narendra Singh Tomar (born 1957), Indian politician
- Nikita Tomar, Indian student who was murdered
- Nitin Tomar, Indian kabaddi player
- Paan Singh Tomar, Indian soldier, rebel and athlete
- Pradhuman Singh Tomar, Indian politician
- Prakashi Tomar (born 1937), Indian sharpshooter
- Preeti Tomar (born 1970), Indian politician
- Rajiv Tomar (born 1982), Indian wrestler
- Rambeer Singh Tomar (1970–2001), Indian army officer
- Ramesh Chand Tomar (born 1948), Indian politician
- Ruchika Tomar, American writer and novelist
- Sandeep Tomar, Indian wrestler
- Seema Tomar (born 1980), Indian trap shooter
- Shalivahan Singh Tomar, Indian royal
- Shivani Tomar, Indian actress
- Somendra Tomar, Indian politician
- Usha Rani Tomar (born 1969), Indian politician
- Vijaypal Singh Tomar, Indian politician
- Yuvika Tomar (born 2001), Indian sport shooter

== See also ==
- Tomer (name)
