= Tomer Frankel =

Israeli swimmer (born 2000)

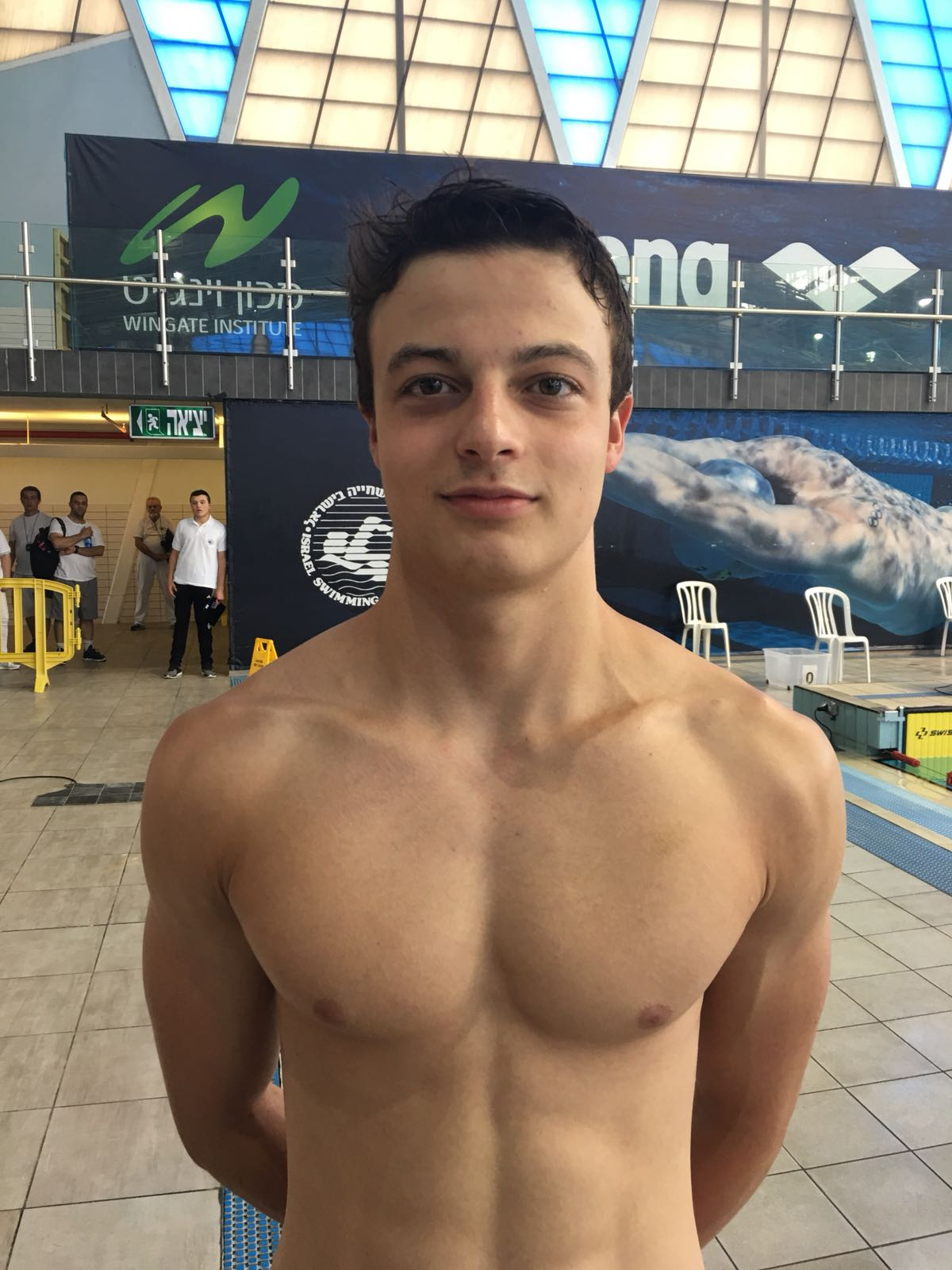
- Tomer Frankel, July 2018

Personal information
- Native name: תומר פרנקל
- Nationality: Israeli
- Born: 18 October 2000 (age 26) Jerusalem, Israel

Sport
- Sport: Swimming
- Strokes: butterfly and freestyle
- Club: Hapoel Jerusalem
- College team: Indiana University
Medal record
Men's swimming
Representing Israel
European Junior Swimming Championships
Gold medal – first place	2018 Helsinki	100 m freestyle
Gold medal – first place	2018 Helsinki	4×200 m freestyle
Bronze medal – third place	2016 Hódmezővásárhely	4×200 m freestyle
Bronze medal – third place	2017 Netanya	4×200 m freestyle
European Youth Olympic Festival
Silver medal – second place	2015 Tbilisi	100 m butterfly
NCAA Division I Swimming Championships
Silver medal – second place	2024 Indianapolis	100 y butterfly

Tomer Frankel (Hebrew: תומר פרנקל; born 18 October 2000) is an Israeli Olympic swimmer. He is the former European junior champion in the 100m freestyle and the 4 × 200m freestyle (2018 Helsinki), and competed at the 2020 Tokyo Olympics. Frankel represented Israel at the 2024 Paris Olympics in the 100 metre freestyle, 100 metre butterfly, 4 × 100 metre freestyle relay, and 4 × 200 metre freestyle relay.

== Early life ==
Frankel was born and raised in Jerusalem, Israel, and his parents are Rafi and Bella Frankel. He has a brother named Roi. He graduated from high school with honors in biology.

== Swimming career ==
Frankel competes in the 100m butterfly, 100m freestyle, 100m medley, 200m butterfly, 200m freestyle, 400m freestyle, 50m butterfly, 4 × 100m freestyle, 4 × 100m medley, 4 × 100m freestyle mixed, 4 × 200m freestyle, and 4x50m freestyle. His club is Hapoel Jerusalem.

=== 2016–17; two-time European Junior bronze medalist ===
In July 2016, at 15 years of age, he won a bronze medal at the 2016 European Junior Swimming Championships in Hódmezővásárhely, Hungary, in the 4 × 200m freestyle relay (7:23.03).

In June 2017, Frankel won a bronze medal at the 2017 European Junior Swimming Championships in Netanya, Israel, in the 4 × 200 m freestyle relay (7:19.57). He competed in the 200m freestyle event at the 2017 World Aquatics Championships the following month.

=== 2018–19; two-time European Junior Champion ===
In May 2018, at 17 years of age, Frankel won and set Israeli records in the 100m butterfly (in 52.25; breaking Alon Mandel’s record set in 2009) and the 200m freestyle (in 1:47.15; breaking Nimrod Shapira Bar-Or's record set in 2008) at the 2018 Israel Cup.

In July 2018, Frankel won gold medals in at the 2018 European Junior Swimming Championships in Helsinki, Finland, in both the 100m freestyle (49.23) and the 4 × 200 m freestyle relay (7:16.28). In December 2018 he won, and set Israeli short course national records, at the 2018 Arena Israeli Swimming Championships in the 400m freestyle (in 3:42.86), the 200m freestyle (in 1:43.50), and the 200m butterfly (in 1:53.72). That month at the Lausanne Swim Cup in Switzerland he won a silver medal in the 200 S free ( 1:44.33).

In March 2019 he won a bronze medal at the Meeting International FFN - Golden Tour in Marseille, France, in the 200m Freestyle in a time of 1:49.12. In April 2019, at the 2019 Israel Cup he won the 200m freestyle in a time of 1:48.40, along with a silver medal in the 100m butterfly (52.55), and a bronze medal in the 50m butterfly (24.11). That same month he won a silver medal in the 50 L butterfly (24.36), and a bronze medal in the 100m butterfly at the Stockholm Open (52.87). In June 2019 Frankel set a new Israeli national record in the 100m butterfly, at 52.16, at the 2019 Sette Colli Trophy in Rome, Italy. That month at the Israel Trials he won a gold medal in the 100m Butterfly (52.69), and a bronze medal in the 100m Freestyle (50.28).

In July and August 2019 at the Israel Summer National Championships (50m), he won gold medals in the 100m Butterfly (52.43), 4 × 100 m Freestyle Relay (3:21.80), and 4 × 200 m Freestyle Relay (7:31.03), a silver medal in the 4 × 100 m Medley Relay (3:58.13), and bronze medals in the 100m Freestyle (49.84) and the 50m Butterfly (24.01). In December 2019, he met the 2020 Olympic qualifying standard of 51.96 in the 100m butterfly with splits of 24.29/27.63 in the 2019 Swim Cup Amsterdam, swimming a 51.92 as he won a gold medal.

=== 2020–21; Big Ten Champion ===
In 2020-21 he was a freshman at Indiana University, and swam for the Indiana Hoosiers. He was an All-American in all seven events. He was First-team All-Big Ten, the Big Ten Champion in the 100-yard butterfly (44.91), 200 freestyle relay (1:16.24, 19.42), and 400 free relay (2:49.20, 42.68), and a bronze medalist in the 200 free (1:33.27), 800 free relay (6:16.12, 1:33.17), and 200 medley relay (1:23.35, 20.13) at the Big Ten Championships.

=== 2020 Tokyo Olympics (2021) ===
At the 2020 Tokyo Olympics in 2021, he finished 21st in the 100-meter butterfly (51.99), and helped Israel finish 10th and break its national record in the 800-meter freestyle relay (7:08.65), splitting 1:48.19.

=== 2021–22; Big Ten Champion and NCAA Championship silver medalist ===
As a sophomore in 2021–22, he was an All-American and Big Ten medalist in all six events, including three first-team performances, was first team All-Big-Ten, and was Academic All-Big-Ten. He was a silver medalist at the NCAA Championships in the 400 yard medley relay (3:00.76) with a 44.19 butterfly split. He was Big Ten Champion in February 2022 in the 800 free relay (6:11.96, 1:32.74) and 400 medley relay (3:00.95, 44.55). He was also conference runner-up in the 200-yard free (1:33.02), 100-yard fly (44.81), 400 free relay (2:47.96, 42.19), and 200 medley relay (1:22.51, 19.78).

In March 2021 at the Central Zone Section 3 Spring Speedo Sectionals 2021 in the US he won a bronze medal in the 100m Freestyle with a time of 50.08. In June 2021 at the Israel National Summer Trial and Championships he won a gold medal in the 100m Butterfly in a time of 51.81, and a silver medal in the 100m Freestyle in a time of 49.27.

=== 2022–23; Big Ten Champion and NCAA Championship bronze medalist ===
As a junior in 2022–23, he was First-team All-American, first-team All-Big Ten, Academic All-Big Ten, and Big Ten medalist in six events. He was the only swimmer in the nation to finish in the top-five in both the 100-yard and 200-yard fly. He was Big Ten Champion in the 400 free relay (2:48.11, 42.12 split), 800 free relay (6:10.80, 1:33.33), and 400 medley relay (3:01.53, 44.42). He was a silver medalist in the 100 fly at the Big Ten Championships, and a bronze medalist in the 200 fly (1:40.97) and 200 medley relay (1:23.52, 19.89 split). In February 2023, at the Big Ten Conference Championships in Ann Arbor, Michigan, he won a silver medal in the 100 Y fly (44.66), and a bronze medal in the 200 Y fly (1:40.97). In March 2023 at the NCAA Division I Mens Championships in Minneapolis, Minnesota, he won a bronze medal in the 100 Y fly with a time of 44.04.

In May 2022, he competed in the Israel Swimming Cup 2022, and won a gold medal in the 100m Freestyle with a time of 49.15, a silver medal in the 200m Freestyle with a time of 1:49.47, and a gold medal in the 100m Butterfly with a time of 52.69. In June 2023, he competed in the Israel Adults Championships - Criteria Competition, and won a silver medal in the 100m Freestyle with a time of 48.18 (a personal best), a silver medal in the 200m Freestyle with a time of 1:46.90 (a personal best), a gold medal in the 50m Butterfly with a time of 23.48 (a personal best), and a silver medal in the 100m Butterfly with a time of 51.14 (a personal best). In July 2023 at the World Aquatics Championships - Fukuoka 2023 he swam the 50 Freestyle in a time of 23.18 (a personal best), and the 50m Butterfly in a personal best 23.48.

=== 2024–present; Big Ten Champion and NCAA Championship silver medalist ===
In March 2024 at the Big Ten Conference Championships in Columbus, Ohio, he won the gold medal in the 100 Y fly (44.32) and the silver medal in the 200 Y fly (1:39.80). In May 2024 at the 2024 NCAA Division I Men's Swimming and Diving Championships in Indianapolis, Indiana, he won the silver medal in the 100 Y butterfly with a time of 43.85.

Frankel represented Israel at the 2024 Paris Olympics in the 100 metre freestyle, 100 metre butterfly, 4 × 100 metre freestyle relay, and 4 × 200 metre freestyle relay.

== See also ==
- List of Israeli records in swimming
