= Sean Grieshop =

American swimmer (born 1998)

Personal information
- Nationality: American
- Born: November 23, 1998 (age 27)
- Height: 6 ft 2 in (188.0 cm)

Sport
- Sport: Swimming
Medal record
Men's swimming
Representing the United States
World University Games
Gold medal – first place	2019 Naples	4×200 m freestyle
Silver medal – second place	2019 Naples	400 m medley
World Junior Championships
Gold medal – first place	2015 Singapore	400 m medley
Gold medal – first place	2015 Singapore	4×200 m freestyle
Bronze medal – third place	2015 Singapore	200 m medley
Junior Pan Pacific Championships
Gold medal – first place	2016 Maui	400 m medley
Silver medal – second place	2016 Maui	4×200 m freestyle
Bronze medal – third place	2014 Maui	1500 m freestyle
Representing the California Golden Bears
Event	1st	2nd	3rd
NCAA Championships	0	2	1
Total	0	2	1
By race
Event	1st	2nd	3rd
500 y freestyle	0	1	0
400 y medley	0	1	1
Total	0	2	1
NCAA Championships
Silver medal – second place	2019 Austin	500 y freestyle
Silver medal – second place	2019 Austin	400 y medley
Bronze medal – third place	2021 Greensboro	400 y medley

Sean Grieshop (born November 23, 1998) is an American competitive swimmer. Grieshop swam for Nitro Swimming in Texas, and after setting numerous National Age Group records, he now swims for the University of California Berkeley Golden Bears. At the 2014 Junior Pan Pacific Swimming Championships, he won the bronze medal in the 1500 meter freestyle with a time of 15:29.87. While competing at the 2015 World Junior Championships, he set his first Junior World Record in the 4 × 200 m freestyle relay with teammates Grant Shoults, Maxime Rooney, and Grant House. At the same meet, he won the gold medal in the 400m individual medley as well as bronze in the 200m individual medley.

At the 2016 U.S. Olympic Trials, Grieshop set his first individual Junior World Record in the 400 individual medley with a time of 4:14.00. In August, at the 2016 Junior Pan Pacific Swimming Championships in Maui, Hawaii, he won the gold medal in the 400 meter individual medley with a 4:16.05 and a silver medal in the 4×200 meter freestyle relay with a final relay time of 7:22.73, contributing a split time of 1:50.76 for the fourth leg of the relay.

In 2018, Grieshop qualified for the Pan Pacific Championships in the 400 Individual Medley.

In 2019, Grieshop placed 2nd in the 400 IM at the World University Games.

In 2021, Grieshop placed 16th in the 400 IM at the US Olympic Trials.

He has been named to the United States National Team (USA Swimming) for 3 consecutive years.
