= Victoria Gracie =

Canadian scientific educator and model

- Born: April 2003 (age 23); Toronto, Ontario, Canada
- Education: Lorne Park Secondary School; University of Toronto
- Modelling information
- Height: 1.75 m (5 ft 9 in)
- Hair colour: Blonde
- Eye colour: Hazel-Green
- Agency: Orange Model Management (Toronto)
- Website: victoriagracie.ca

Victoria Gracie (born April 2003) is a Canadian scientific educator and fashion model, best known for her multiple TEDx Talks on body image and body dysmorphic disorder. Her interests focus on the ethology and neurobiology of body dysmorphic disorder.

== Background ==
=== Early life ===
Gracie was born in April 2003 in Toronto, Ontario, Canada. At the age of 14, she broke a Canadian record at the world's largest scholarship ballet competition, Youth America Grand Prix, becoming the first Canadian competitor to register as an independent soloist presenting a self-choreographed ballet routine. Her objective was to create a societal shift in the acceptance of different body types in the ballet industry. In a 2024 interview, she said:

“I was the first Canadian to ever do that. And I did it to say, hey, you know what? Everybody can be a ballet body. And that was how I got involved in body positivity as a movement.”

Gracie later competed in Miss International Canada and Miss Canada, where she placed in the top 8 finalists. In 2024, she was scouted by and signed on to Orange Model Management (also known as Orange Models).

She is currently pursuing a double specialist degree at the University of Toronto.

=== TEDx Talks ===
In January 2024, Gracie delivered her first TEDx Talk at the TEDxUofT annual conference at the Isabel Bader Theatre. In this talk, Gracie offers a unique perspective on the link between scientific research on body image, particularly clinical research on body image disturbances, and the body positivity movement. She examines the interplay of biological, psychological, and social factors in shaping our body image, arguing for a more integrated approach that consolidates a scientific basis into the current body positivity movement, as a means to support those living with or at risk of developing body image disturbances more effectively.

In February 2024, Gracie presented her second TEDx Talk at the TEDxMcMasterU annual conference at the L.R. Wilson Concert Hall titled "Does social media think you're pretty". In this talk, Gracie examines a scientific view of beauty standards and social media, particularly focusing on how social media use is correlated to a more negatively skewed body image and why this may be the case. Her second TEDx Talk is most noted for its introduction line: "I hate social media."

Gracie's talks inspired the TVO Documentary The Hidden Perils of Obsessing Over Your Body, where she co-stars alongside Kyle T Ganson, PhD. The episode aired on The Agenda with Steve Paikin and TVO Today on October 28, 2024.

In 2025, Gracie is set to deliver her third and fourth TEDx talks at TEDxQueensU and TEDxUofTMississauga.
