= Ryan Hoffer =

American competitive swimmer (born 1998)

Personal information
- Born: July 9, 1998 (age 27) Scottsdale, Arizona, U.S.

Sport
- Sport: Swimming
- Strokes: Freestyle, butterfly
- Club: DC Trident; Scottsdale Aquatic Club
- College team: University of California, Berkeley
Medal record
Men's swimming
Representing United States
Event	1st	2nd	3rd
World Junior Championships	0	2	0
Total	0	2	0
World Junior Championships
Silver medal – second place	2015 Singapore	4×100 m freestyle
Silver medal – second place	2015 Singapore	4×100 m medley
Junior Pan Pacific Championships
Gold medal – first place	2016 Maui	4×100 m freestyle
Bronze medal – third place	2016 Maui	50 m freestyle
Men's swimming
Representing the California Golden Bears
Event	1st	2nd	3rd
NCAA Championships	7	4	4
Total	7	4	4
By race
Event	1st	2nd	3rd
50 y freestyle	2	0	0
100 y freestyle	1	0	0
100 y butterfly	1	0	0
4×50 y freestyle	2	0	1
4×100 y freestyle	1	0	2
4×50 y medley	0	2	1
4×100 y medley	0	2	0
Total	7	4	4
NCAA Championships
Gold medal – first place	2019 Austin	50 y freestyle
Gold medal – first place	2019 Austin	4×50 y freestyle
Gold medal – first place	2021 Greensboro	50 y freestyle
Gold medal – first place	2021 Greensboro	100 y freestyle
Gold medal – first place	2021 Greensboro	100 y butterfly
Gold medal – first place	2021 Greensboro	4×50 y freestyle
Gold medal – first place	2021 Greensboro	4×100 y freestyle
Silver medal – second place	2018 Minneapolis	4×50 y medley
Silver medal – second place	2019 Austin	4×50 y medley
Silver medal – second place	2019 Austin	4×100 y medley
Silver medal – second place	2021 Greensboro	4×100 y medley
Bronze medal – third place	2018 Minneapolis	4×50 y freestyle
Bronze medal – third place	2018 Minneapolis	4×100 y freestyle
Bronze medal – third place	2019 Austin	4×100 y freestyle
Bronze medal – third place	2021 Greensboro	4×50 y medley

Ryan Hoffer (born July 9, 1998) is an American competitive swimmer who specializes in freestyle and butterfly events. He competes as part of the International Swimming League for the team DC Trident. Hoffer is currently the national age group record holder in the 100 yard freestyle for the boys 17-18 year old age group. He won two silver medals at the 2015 FINA World Junior Swimming Championships in relay events.

== Background ==
Hoffer competed for Scottsdale Aquatic Club before joining the University of California Berkeley's swim program. He is the son of Allison and Scott Hoffer, who both swam at Arizona State University.

== Swimming career ==
=== 2015 ===
==== 2015 World Junior Championships ====
2015 World Junior Championships
Silver medal – second place	4×100 m freestyle	3:18.42
Silver medal – second place	4×100 m medley	3:37.51 (h)

At the 2015 FINA World Junior Swimming Championships held in Singapore in August 2015, Hoffer won his first medal, a silver medal, in the 4×100 meter freestyle relay, splitting a time of 49.97 seconds for the lead-off leg of the relay in the final and helping the relay attain a time of 3:18.42. In the 4×100 meter medley relay, Hoffer won his second medal swimming the butterfly leg of the relay on the prelims relay, and winning a silver medal when the finals relay finished second in a time of 3:37.51.

==== 2015 Winter Junior National Championships ====
Hoffer won the 50 freestyle, 100 butterfly, 100 backstroke, and 100 freestyle at the 2015 Speedo Winter Junior National Championships. In the 50 yard freestyle, Hoffer broke the National Age Group record of 41.90 seconds set by Caeleb Dressel for the boys 17–18 age group with his time of 41.23 seconds, lowering the record by over 0.6 seconds. Hoffer also contributed to wins in the 4×50 medley relay, 4×200 freestyle relay, and 4×50 freestyle relay for Scottsdale Aquatic Club.

=== Collegiate seasons 2017–2021 ===
As a freshman at Cal, Hoffer earned individual All-American honors in the 50 freestyle and 100 butterfly events. In his sophomore and junior seasons, Hoffer added an All-American title in the 100 freestyle in addition to the 50 freestyle, 100 butterfly, and relay accolades he had received as a freshman. Hoffer won the 50 freestyle at the 2019 NCAA Championships ahead of Cal teammate Pawel Sendyk en route to an NCAA team championship. At the 2021 NCAA Division I Men's Swimming and Diving Championships Hoffer won the 50 freestyle, this time ahead of teammate Bjorn Seeliger, the 100 freestyle, and the 100 butterfly, as well as the 200 freestlye relay and the 400 freestyle relay.

=== 2021 ===
In the 2021 International Swimming League draft, Hoffer was picked by the DC Trident as the number two rookie pick for the entire league. In the fifth match of the regular season, Hoffer won the 50 meter freestyle in 21.25 seconds, finishing eight-hundredths of a second ahead of Shane Ryan of the Toronto Titans. In the eleventh match of the season, and the only play-in match of the year, Hoffer won the 50 meter freestyle with a time of 21.13 seconds, which was less than a tenth of a second faster than second-place finisher Thom de Boer of Team Iron.

== Career best times ==
=== Short course meters (25 m pool) ===
As of November 28, 2021

Event	Time	Meet	Location	Date
50 m freestyle	21.03	2021 International Swimming League	Naples, Italy	September 30, 2021
100 m freestyle	47.93	2021 International Swimming League	Eindhoven, Netherlands	November 11, 2021
50 m backstroke	24.46	2021 International Swimming League	Naples, Italy	September 24, 2021
50 m butterfly	22.93	2021 International Swimming League	Naples, Italy	September 10, 2021

== Honors and awards ==
- In 2020, Hoffer was a semifinalist for the AAU James E. Sullivan Award.
- Hoffer received the Pac-12 Conference male "Swimmer of the Year" award in 2020 and 2021.
