= Yang Jintong =

Chinese swimmer

Personal information
- National team: China
- Born: 18 December 1998 (age 27) Tianjin, China

Sport
- Sport: Swimming
- Strokes: freestyle
Medal record
Men's swimming
Representing China
Asian Games
Gold medal – first place	2022 Hangzhou	4×100 m freestyle
Silver medal – second place	2018 Jakarta	4×100 m freestyle
World Junior Championships
Gold medal – first place	2015 Singapore	800 m freestyle
Silver medal – second place	2015 Singapore	400 m freestyle

Yang Jintong is a Chinese competitive swimmer. He won the gold medal in the 800 meter freestyle at the 2015 FINA World Junior Swimming Championships in Singapore. He also won the silver medal in the 400 meter freestyle behind Grant Shoults.

In 2014 at the 2nd FINA World Junior Open Water Swimming Championships in Balatonfüred, Hungary, Yang won the silver medal in the 5 km youth event. Together with his teammates Qiao Zhongyi and Yan Siyu, he won the gold medal in the mixed team event.

At the senior 2015 Chinese Championships in Huangshan, Yang finished second in the 400-meter freestyle, behind reigning Olympic champion Sun Yang.
