= 2021 NCAA Division I Men's Swimming and Diving Championships =

Collegiate swimming and diving championships

2021 NCAA Division I Swimming and Diving Championships
- Host city: Greensboro, North Carolina
- Date: March 24–27, 2021
- Venue: Greensboro Aquatic Center

The 2021 NCAA Division I Men's Swimming and Diving Championships were contested from March 24–27, 2021 at the Greensboro Aquatic Center in Greensboro, North Carolina. It was the 97th annual NCAA-sanctioned swim meet to determine the team and individual national champions of Division I men's collegiate swimming and diving in the United States.

== Team standings ==
- Full results

| Rank | Team | Points |
|---|---|---|
| 1st place, gold medalist(s) | Texas | 595 |
| 2nd place, silver medalist(s) | California | 568 |
| 3rd place, bronze medalist(s) | Florida | 367 |
| 4 | Georgia | 268 |
| 5 | Louisville | 211 |
| 6 | Indiana | 207 |
| 7 | Ohio State | 180 |
| 8 | NC State | 164 |
| 9 | Virginia | 152 |
| 10 | Texas A&M | 151 |
| 11 | Virginia Tech | 135 |
| T-12 | Michigan | 106 |
| T-12 | Arizona | 106 |
| 14 | Stanford | 99 |
| 15 | Alabama | 91 |
| 16 | Missouri | 86 |
| 17 | Purdue | 83 |
| 18 | LSU | 68 |
| 19 | Miami (FL) | 54 |
| 20 | Tennessee | 48 |
| T-21 | Georgia Tech | 40 |
| T-21 | Minnesota | 40 |
| 23 | Florida State | 32.5 |
| 24 | North Carolina | 31 |
| 25 | Notre Dame | 29 |
| 26 | Pittsburgh | 28 |
| 27 | USC | 21 |
| 28 | Wisconsin | 20 |
| 29 | Utah | 17.5 |
| 30 | Kentucky | 14 |
| 31 | Penn State | 13 |
| 32 | West Virginia | 5 |

== Swimming results ==
Full results

| Event | Gold | | Silver | | Bronze | |
|---|---|---|---|---|---|---|
| 50 freestyle | Ryan Hoffer; California | 18.33 | Björn Seeliger; California | 18.71 | Adam Chaney; Florida | 18.88 |
| 100 freestyle | Ryan Hoffer; California | 40.89 | Drew Kibler; Texas Daniel Krueger; Texas | 41.59 | None awarded | |
| 200 freestyle | Kieran Smith; Florida | 1:30.10 | Drew Kibler; Texas | 1:30.39 | Trenton Julian; California | 1:31.55 |
| 500 freestyle | Jake Magahey; Georgia | 4:07.97; MR | Kieran Smith; Florida | 4:08.07 | Brooks Fail; Arizona | 4:09.54 |
| 1650 freestyle | Bobby Finke; Florida | 14:12.52; MR | Jake Magahey; Georgia | 14.28.69 | Ross Dant; NC State | 14:31.17 |
| 100 backstroke | Shaine Casas; Texas A&M | 44.20 | Kacper Stokowski; NC State | 44.37 | Destin Lasco; California | 44.49 |
| 200 backstroke | Shaine Casas; Texas A&M | 1:35.75 | Destin Lasco; California | 1:35.99 | Bryce Mefford; California | 1:38.31 |
| 100 breaststroke | Max McHugh; Minnesota | 50.18 | Dillon Hillis; Florida | 50.96 | Reece Whitley; California | 51.03 |
| 200 breaststroke | Max McHugh; Minnesota | 1:49.02 | Reece Whitley; California | 1:49.43 | Hugo González; California | 1:51.20 |
| 100 butterfly | Ryan Hoffer; California | 44.25 | Nicolas Albiero; Louisville | 44.32 | Camden Murphy; Georgia | 44.42 |
| 200 butterfly | Nicolas Albiero; Louisville | 1:38.64 | Trenton Julian; California | 1:38.85 | Antani Ivanov; Virginia Tech | 1:39.26 |
| 200 IM | Shaine Casas; Texas A&M | 1:39.53 | Hugo González; California | 1:39.99 | Destin Lasco; California | 1:40.01 |
| 400 IM | Bobby Finke; Florida | 3:36.90 | Carson Foster; Texas | 3:38.25 | Sean Grieshop; California | 3:38.73 |
| 200 freestyle relay | California; Björn Seeliger (18.72); Ryan Hoffer (18.06); Daniel Carr (18.51); Nate Biondi (19.07) | 1:14.36 | Florida; Adam Chaney (18.81); Will Davis (18.59); Kieran Smith (18.70); Eric Friese (18.38) | 1:14.48 | Alabama; Matt King (18.99); Sam Disette (18.91); Jonathan Berneburg (18.79); Colton Stogner (18.93) | 1:15.62 |
| 400 freestyle relay | California; Björn Seeliger (42.22); Ryan Hoffer (40.86); Destin Lasco (41.74); Hugo González (41.78) | 2:46.60 | Florida; Adam Chaney (41.74); Kieran Smith (41.27); Eric Friese (41.45); Trey Freeman (42.42) | 2:46.88 | Louisville; Haridi Sameh (41.94); Nicolas Albiero (42.09); Michael Eastman (42.05); Colton Paulson (41.90) | 2:47.98 |
| 800 freestyle relay | Texas; Drew Kibler (1:30.65); Austin Katz (1:33.02); Carson Foster (1:31.55); Jake Sannem (1:32.03) | 6:07.25 | California; Trenton Julian (1:31.41); Daniel Carr (1:33.14); Destin Lasco (1:32.13); Bryce Mefford (1:32.00) | 6:08.68 | Texas A&M; Shaine Casas (1:30.59); Mark Theall (1:31.46); Koko Bratanov (1:33.31); Clayton Bobo (1:35.43) | 6:10.79 |
| 200 medley relay | Louisville; Mitchell Whyte (20.72); Evgenii Somov (22.87); Nicolas Albiero (20.07); Haridi Sameh (18.45) | 1:22.11 | Florida; Adam Chaney (20.55); Dillon Hillis (23.33); Eric Friese (19.87); Will Davis (18.66) | 1:22.41 | California; Daniel Carr (20.79); Reece Whitley (23.57); Ryan Hoffer (19.70); Björn Seeliger (18.37) | 1:22.43 |
| 400 medley relay | Texas; Chris Staka (45.02); Caspar Corbeau (50.36); Alvin Jiang (44.05); Daniel Krueger (40.80) | 3:00.23 | California; Destin Lasco (45.28); Reece Whitley (50.58); Ryan Hoffer (43.80); Björn Seeliger (41.07) | 3:00.73 | Florida; Adam Chaney (45.36); Dillon Hillis (50.27); Eric Friese (44.66); Kieran Smith (41.22) | 3:01.51 |

Legend: MR – Meet record;

== Diving results ==
| Event | Gold | | Silver | | Bronze | |
|---|---|---|---|---|---|---|
| 1 m diving | Jordan Windle; Texas | 435.60 | Noah Duperre; Texas | 405.45 | Juan Hernandez; LSU | 405.25 |
| 3 m diving | Andrew Capobianco; Indiana | 505.20 | Jordan Windle; Texas | 484.60 | Juan Hernandez; LSU | 452.50 |
| Platform diving | Brandon Loschiavo; Purdue | 469.05 | Ben Bramley; Purdue | 450.20 | Zach Cooper; Miami | 442.65 |

== See also ==
- List of college swimming and diving teams
