= List of Men's At-Large Academic All-America Team Members of the Year =

Student athlete award

The Men's At-Large Academic All-America Team Members of the Year is the annual most outstanding singular male collegiate athlete selected from the combined at-large sports pool. Presented annually by College Sports Communicators since the expansion of the program, the honor represents the highest academic and athletic achievement across non-major standalone sports. Selections are divided across five distinct program tiers: NCAA Division I, Division II, Division III, NAIA, and the College Division.

The College Division consists of two-year colleges, Canadian institutions, and any other instituation not affiliated with the NCAA or NAIA.

== Tables of winners ==
Key
†	Indicates winners of the all-sports Academic All-America award.

All winners are American unless indicated otherwise.

Men's At-Large Academic All-America Team Members of the Year
- Awarded for: The yearly outstanding male college athlete at-large Academic All-America team member
- Country: United States and Canada
- Presented by: College Sports Communicators

History
- Most recent: Asher Cohen, Nebraska; Crew Howard, Nebraska–Kearney; Mark Addison, Augustana (IL); Matt Pennala, Saint Xavier; Madden Butler, Itawamba
- Next ceremony: July 2027
- Website: Official site

=== Two-division era (1987–2011) ===
Male At-large Academic All-America Team Members of the Year (1987–2011)
Year	University Division			College Division			Ref
Year	Winner	School	Sport	Winner	School	Sport	Ref
1987–88	James Martin	Penn State	Wrestling	John Waters	Baldwin Wallace	Soccer	
1988–89	James Martin†	Penn State	Wrestling	Joseph Turk	Wabash	Swimming	
1989–90	Al Parker	Georgia	Tennis	William Singhose	MIT	Track and field	
1990–91	Al Parker†	Georgia	Tennis	Kris Presler	North Dakota	Wrestling	
1991–92	David Honea	NC State	Cross country/Track and field	Lewis Miller	Kalamazoo	Tennis	
1992–93	John Roethlisberger	Minnesota	Gymnastics	Lewis Miller	Kalamazoo	Tennis	
1993–94	Byron Schneider	Penn State	Volleyball	Carl Erikson†	Oberlin	Tennis	
1994–95	Darren Eales	Brown	Soccer	Robby Scott	Abilene Christian	Tennis	
1995–96 (Fall/Winter)	Mike Fisher	Virginia	Soccer	John Weigel	North Central	Cross country	
1995–96 (Spring)	J’Dee Wilson	Utah State	Track and field	Ryan Carpenter	Augustana (IL)	Track and field	
1996–97 (Fall/Winter)	Mike Fisher	Virginia	Soccer	Matt Brill	North Central	Cross country	
1996–97 (Spring)	Scott Keane	Cincinnati	Track and field	Ryan Chaney	George Fox	Track and field	
1997–98 (Fall/Winter)	Marcos Scrivner	West Virginia	Rifle	Torsten Seifert	Kenyon	Swimming	
1997–98 (Spring)	(Canada) Kevin Sullivan	Michigan	Track and field	Ryan Loftus	Rose–Hulman	Track and field	
1998–99 (Fall/Winter)	John Cahoy	Minnesota	Swimming	Martin Forman	Ohio Wesleyan	Soccer	
1998–99 (Spring)	Tom Hand	LSU	Tennis	Jason Hilt	Kutztown	Track and field	
1999–2000 (Fall/Winter)	(Canada) Joel Laing	RPI	Ice hockey	Mark Latronica	UC San Diego	Swimming	
1999–2000 (Spring)	Daniel Anderson	VCU	Tennis	Christian Witt	Barry	Tennis	
2000–01 (Fall/Winter)	Karl Goehring	North Dakota	Ice hockey	Ryan Requist	North Dakota	Swimming	
2000–01 (Spring)	Bryce Molder	Georgia Tech	Golf	Brad Parris	McMurry	Track and field	
2001–02	Justin Dumais	Texas	Swimming	Tom Shane	Emory	Swimming	
2002–03	(Greece) Costas Theocharidis	Hawaii	Volleyball	Daniel Kiepfer	Kenyon	Swimming	
2003–04	Caesar Garcia	Auburn	Swimming	Jack Pennutto	Missouri S&T	Swimming	
2004–05	Mitch Richeson	Ohio State	Swimming	Chris Pearson	Carnegie Mellon	Swimming	
2005–06	Zack Robinson	Oklahoma State	Golf	Bill Gaul	Missouri S&T	Swimming	
2006–07	Ben Wildman-Tobriner	Stanford	Swimming	Bill Gaul	Missouri S&T	Swimming	
2007–08	Mike Leveille	Syracuse	Lacrosse	Josh Mitchell	Kenyon	Swimming	
2008–09	Jeff Lerg	Michigan State	Ice hockey	John Kegelman	Johns Hopkins	Swimming	
2009–10	Jeff Spear	Columbia	Fencing	Dan Laurent	Wisconsin–La Crosse	Swimming	
2010–11	Nick Amuchastegui	Stanford	Wrestling	Kellen Beckwith	Olivet	Swimming	

=== Four-division era (2011–18) ===
Male At-large Academic All-America Team Members of the Year (2011–2018)
Year	Division I			Division II			Division III			College			Ref
Year	Winner	School	Sport	Winner	School	Sport	Winner	School	Sport	Winner	School	Sport	Ref
2011–12	Nick Amuchastegui	Stanford	Swimming	Luke McPeek	Adams State	Wrestling	Seth Ecker	Ithaca	Wrestling	(Canada) Kyle Ross	Saskatchewan	Ice hockey	
2012–13	Brendan Buckley	Army	Lacrosse	Mark Rubin	Incarnate Word	Swimming	Curtis Ramsey	Kenyon	Swimming	(Spain) Nicolas Pinones-Haltenhoff	Auburn Montgomery	Tennis	
2013–14	Michael Newburger	Ohio State	Gymnastics	(Spain) Ruben Gimenez	Bridgeport	Swimming	Andrew Chevalier	Kenyon	Swimming	(Canada) Bogdan Knezevic	Calgary	Swimming	
2014–15	Matt Brown†	Penn State	Wrestling	(Spain) Ruben Gimenez	Bridgeport	Swimming	Andrew Wilson	Emory	Swimming	(Spain) Nicolas Pinones-Haltenhoff	Auburn Montgomery	Tennis	
2015–16	(Iceland) Anton McKee	Alabama	Swimming	Keith Sponsler	Missouri S&T	Swimming	Glenn Balbus	Johns Hopkins	Fencing	Jacob Anderson	Olivet Nazarene	Swimming	
2016–17	(Iceland) Anton McKee	Alabama	Swimming	Nate Rodriguez	Maryville (MO)	Wrestling	Andrew Wilson	Emory	Swimming	(South Africa) Andrew Williamson	Wayland Baptist	Golf	
2017–18	PJ Ransford	Michigan	Swimming	Nolan Kistler	Cal Baptist	Wrestling	(Canada) Braeden Ostepchuk	Norwich	Ice hockey	(Argentina) Kevin Konfederak	Georgia Gwinnett	Tennis	

=== Five-division era (2018–present) ===
Male At-large Academic All-America Team Members of the Year (2018–present)
Year	Division I			Division II			Division III			NAIA			College			Ref
Year	Winner	School	Sport	Winner	School	Sport	Winner	School	Sport	Winner	School	Sport	Winner	School	Sport	Ref
2018–19	(Netherlands) Laurent Bams	Alabama	Swimming	Charlie Bertrand†	Merrimack	Lacrosse	Bebe Wang	Denison	Swimming	Jimmy Aschenbrenner	Morningside	Volleyball	Swayze Bozeman	Copiah–Lincoln	Football	
2019–20	Charlie Bertrand	Merrimack	Lacrosse	Zach Bodeau	Rockhurst	Lacrosse	Bebe Wang†	Denison	Swimming	(Czech Republic) Lukas Macek	Keiser	Swimming	(England) Jon Hopkins	Mississippi Gulf Coast	Golf	
2020–21	Nick Albiero	Louisville	Swimming	Jerry Brown	Lindenwood	Swimming	Mason Nissley	Messiah	Volleyball	Andrew Clifford	College of Idaho	Swimming	Graham Crawford	Pearl River	Baseball	
2021–22	Nick Albiero	Louisville	Swimming	(Namibia) Xander Skinner	McKendree	Swimming	Kellan Grant	Pomona–Pitzer	Water polo	Eric Vermillion	Indiana Tech	Wrestling	Zach Ferris	Cloud County	Wrestling	
2022–23	Ford Clegg	Mississippi State	Golf	Dylan Checketts	Colorado Mesa	Lacrosse	Tyler Shilson	Augsburg	Wrestling	Korey Reichard	Concordia–Ann Arbor	Bowling	Chase Kaiser	Mississippi Gulf Coast	Golf	
2023–24	Mark Berlaga	Stanford	Gymnastics	Sam Tandy	Harding	Golf	(Italy) Lorenzo Mencaccini	Castleton	Alpine skiing	Aric Williams	Dakota Wesleyan	Wrestling	Andrew Zielinski	Mississippi Gulf Coast	Golf	
2024–25	Mark Berlaga	Stanford	Gymnastics	Ty McGeary	West Liberty	Wrestling	Christian Sheaffer	Southern Virginia	Volleyball	Matt Pennala	Saint Xavier	Volleyball	Kaden Banks	Indian Hills	Track and field	
2025–26	Asher Cohen	Nebraska	Gymnastics	Crew Howard	Nebraska–Kearney	Wrestling	Mark Addison	Augustana (IL)	Water polo	Matt Pennala	Saint Xavier	Volleyball	Madden Butler	Itawamba	Baseball	
