= Lorne Park Secondary School =

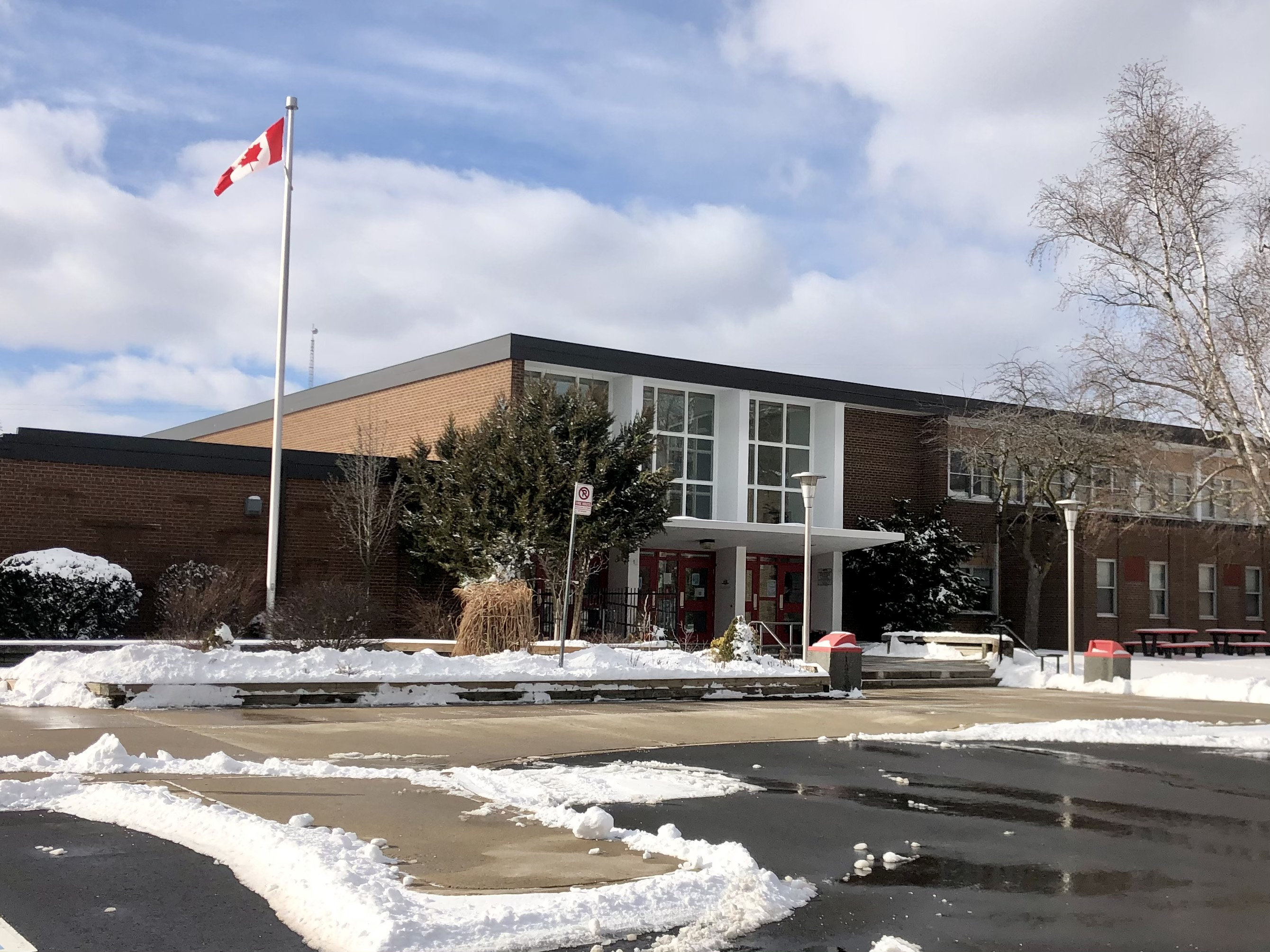

Location
- 1324 Lorne Park Road; Mississauga, Ontario, L5H 3B1; Canada; 43.5313°N 79.6246°W

Information
- School type: Public High school
- Motto: Portam Futuro Aperimus (Opening the Doors to the Future)
- Founded: June 1, 1958
- School board: Peel District School Board
- Superintendent: Nina Jaiswal
- Area trustee: Brad MacDonald
- School number: 924008
- Principal: Erin Vardy
- Grades: 9-12
- Enrolment: 779 (August 17, 2025)
  - Grade 9: 190
  - Grade 10: 184
  - Grade 11: 159
  - Grade 12: 246
- Language: English, Extended French
- Colours: Red and Grey
- Team name: Spartans
- Yearbook: The Key
- Special programs: Regional Enhanced Program; Extended French program
- Website: lorneparkss.peelschools.org

Lorne Park Secondary School (often abbreviated as LP or LPSS) is a public high school located in Mississauga, Ontario, Canada. It serves the Lorne Park neighbourhood, as well as a larger catchment area for the Extended French program for all of southern Mississauga. The school's sports teams have produced a number of professional athletes.

== History ==
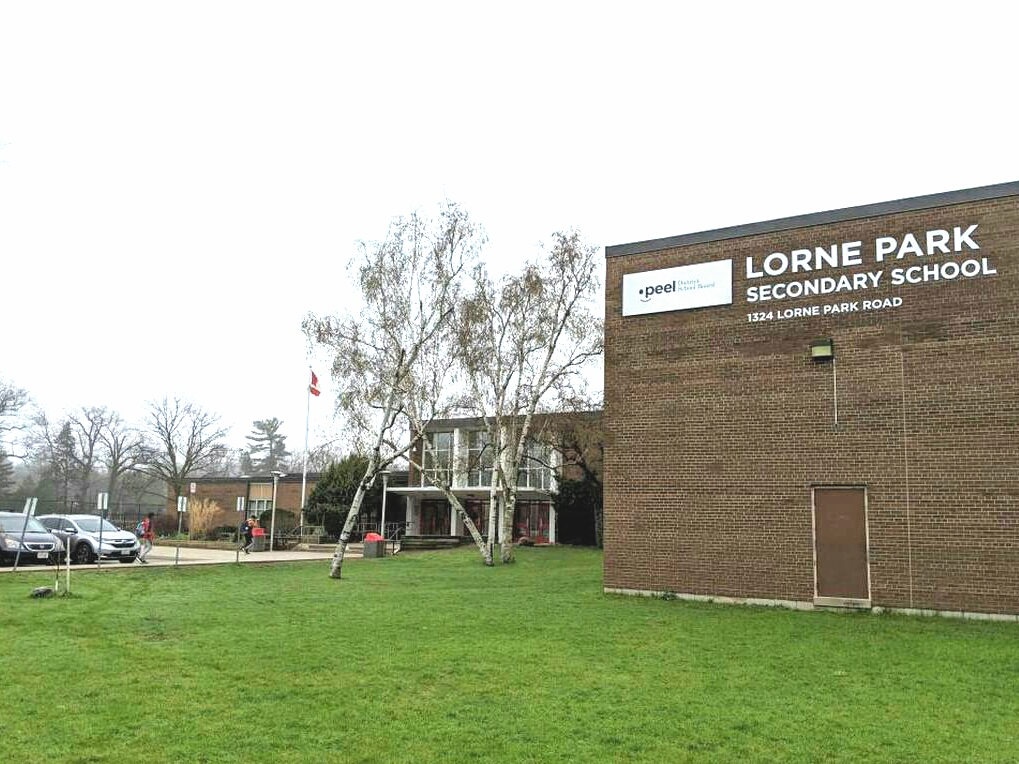
Lorne Park Secondary School's front entrance.

When the population of Peel County began growing rapidly in the 1950s, the secretary-treasurer for the South Peel Board of Education began negotiations to purchase land for a new school to be built on a 13½ acre site at the price of $32,469. Construction on the school began in 1957, and the total cost of the school (including the land) was $752,569.

Billed as a very modern design when the school opened for students in January 1958, the main feature of the school, facing south onto Lorne Park Road, was a suspended concrete canopy with two-story windows. The school opened with 272 students and 16 teachers.

The school went through a series of upgrades in the first 20 years of its existence. In 1962, a cafeteria was built on the South-East of the building. In 1964, the school underwent a major construction project in which a second, larger gymnasium, weight rooms, technology shops and classrooms as well as a completely new section to the north which housed 2 floors of classrooms were constructed. The 1964 upgrades raised the student capacity from 300 to 1800. In 1972, a library and lecture hall was erected to East side of the main building.

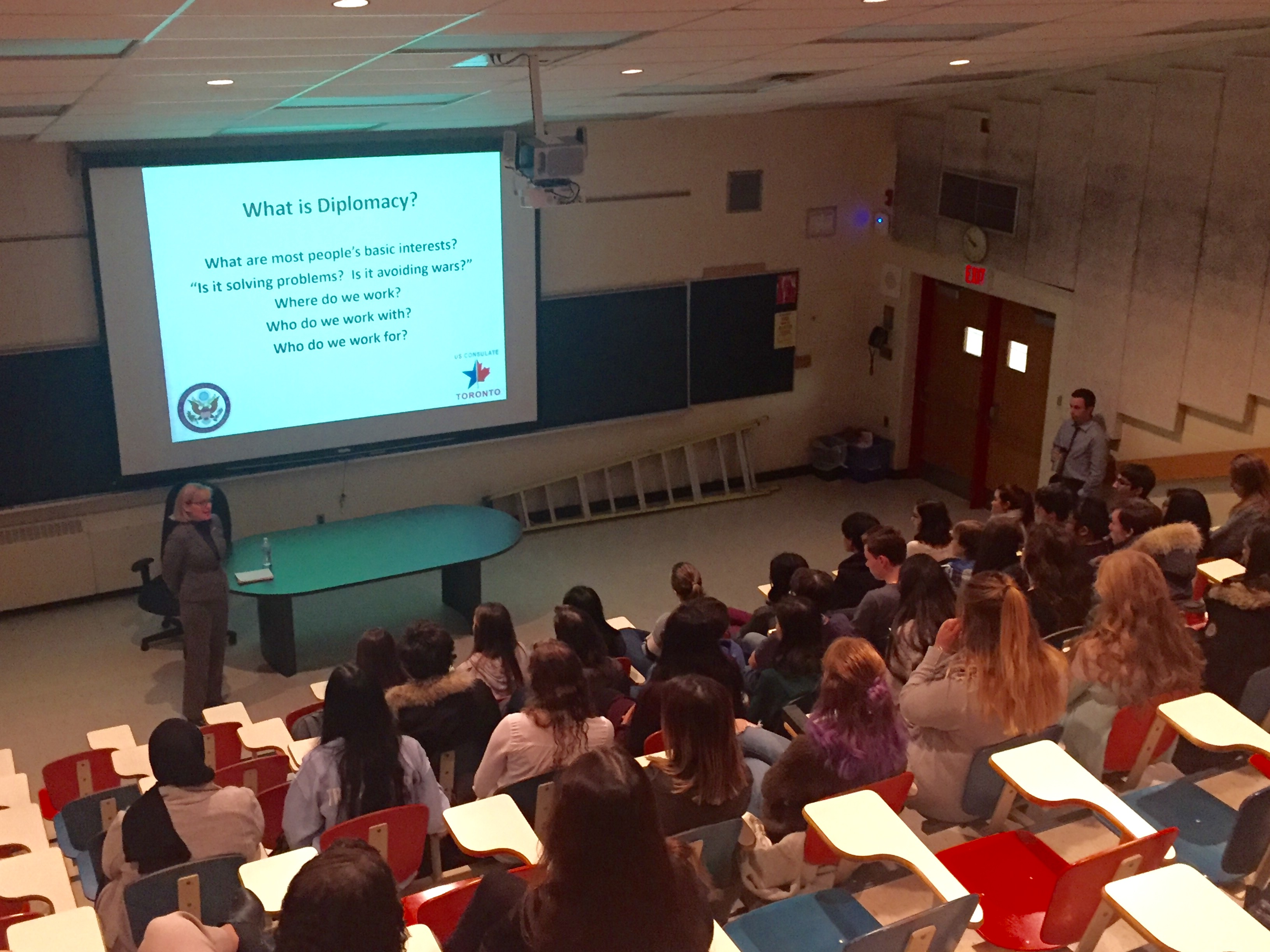
A presentation in the school's lecture hall.

While not in use presently, a firing range exists in the basement of the school (beneath the small gymnasium). It was built in order to secure extra funding during the Cold War period and so that students could have a suitable area to practice in. Later, the firing range housed the drama department's props and costumes. It was listed as permanently closed and removed from official architectural plans in the 2000s, though it is still used to store theatrical props.

In 1973, Lorne Park was the first school in the Peel Board of Education to offer full-credit semestering. The success of the experiment led to the extension of semestering to most schools in Peel by 1976.

The school population peaked in 1979, when Lorne Park had a teaching staff of 92 and 1,647 students.

The current student population stands at 779 students. Lorne Park hosts an Extended French program. Its feeder schools are Hillcrest Middle School, Tecumseh Public School, Green Glade Senior Public School (Extended French only), St. Christopher Catholic School, Allan A. Martin Senior Public School and St. Luke Catholic School.

As of 2016, Lorne Park was expending around $800,000 in annual operational costs including roughly $150,000 in utilities alone. In the 2015–16 school year, the school spent $786 per student per year in facility costs.

== Sports ==
Lorne Park has a variety of athletic programs, including football, cross-country, rugby, ice hockey and women's lacrosse teams. They have produced several OFSAA and ROPSSAA champions in women's lacrosse, cross-country, track and field, boys' and girls' hockey, field hockey, basketball, skiing, badminton, football, baseball, swimming, rugby and tennis. The junior cross-country ski team were 2007 OFSAA champions. The girl's varsity flag football team were the 2024/2025 ROPSSAA champions.

Due to these successes, Lorne Park has been designated as having a Specialist High Skills Major in "Sports" by the Peel district school board.

=== Men's Football ===
Lorne Park's Football team competes in the Region of Peel Secondary Schools Athletic Association (ROPSSAA) at the Tier 1 level. The program conducts both Senior and Junior (now termed "Varsity" and "Junior Varsity", respectively) football programs. Both teams have been consistently competitive within the region since the programs' inception in the late '50s. At the Junior Varsity level, the program boasts 21 regional championships and 1 provincial championship. At the Varsity level, Lorne Park has 20 regional championships and 5 provincial championships.

Since 1983 (when the program started keeping track of alumni), over 150 former program graduates have gone on to play football at the Canadian University level. Spartans have also won numerous awards at this level (e.g., All-Canadians, Team MVPs, etc.). In particular, the most prestigious Canadian Interuniversity Sport award——the Hec Crighton Trophy——was won by a Spartan alumnus (Mike Raham) in 1968. Spartan alumnus Jack Cassar won the President's trophy for "Most Outstanding Stand-up Defensive Player" for his contributions as middle linebacker with the Carleton Ravens in 2019.

==== Super Bowl High School Honour Roll ====
In anniversary of Super Bowl 50 in 2015, the NFL created a "Super Bowl High School Honor Roll". This was an initiative which gave recognition to high schools across the world which produced alumni who later went on to win the Super Bowl. Due to Klaus Wilmsmeyer success at the pro level, Lorne Park was among those recognized and were subsequently awarded a commemorative golden football by the NFL. The Lorne Park Spartans football program was 1 of 15 high schools in all of Canada to have received the honour. The football currently stands in the school's football trophy display case.

=== Men's Rugby ===
Lorne Park had multiple Ropssaa championships at both Junior and Senior levels as well as tournament wins in the Red Hot Rugby Tournament and the 7's tournament held at Fletcher's Fields. In 2009, after winning the Region of Peel Championships (ROPSSAA) the Senior Spartan team lost in the finals of the OFSAA (Ontario) championships to Lindsay C.I. In 2010, the Spartans returned as Peel Champions. After going through most of the season ranked #4 in Ontario, the Spartans achieved the #1 ranking going into the OFSAA championships. In the 3 day tournament the Lorne Park Spartans ultimately defeated Uxbridge in the finals to win the OFSAA title. This senior team had a 2-year record of 43-1. Some of the players from this team represented Ontario and Canada in National and International competitions. The team was recognized by the Mississauga Sports Council annual Sports Dinner as the High School Team of the Year for their accomplishments in 2010. In 2011, the Junior Spartans won the ROPSSAA championship against Streetsville with a score of 10-8. In 2013 and 2014 both Junior and Senior Spartan teams won their respective ROPSSAA championships. Also in 2014, the Junior Spartan team won the Barbarian Cup for the first time in Lorne Park history.

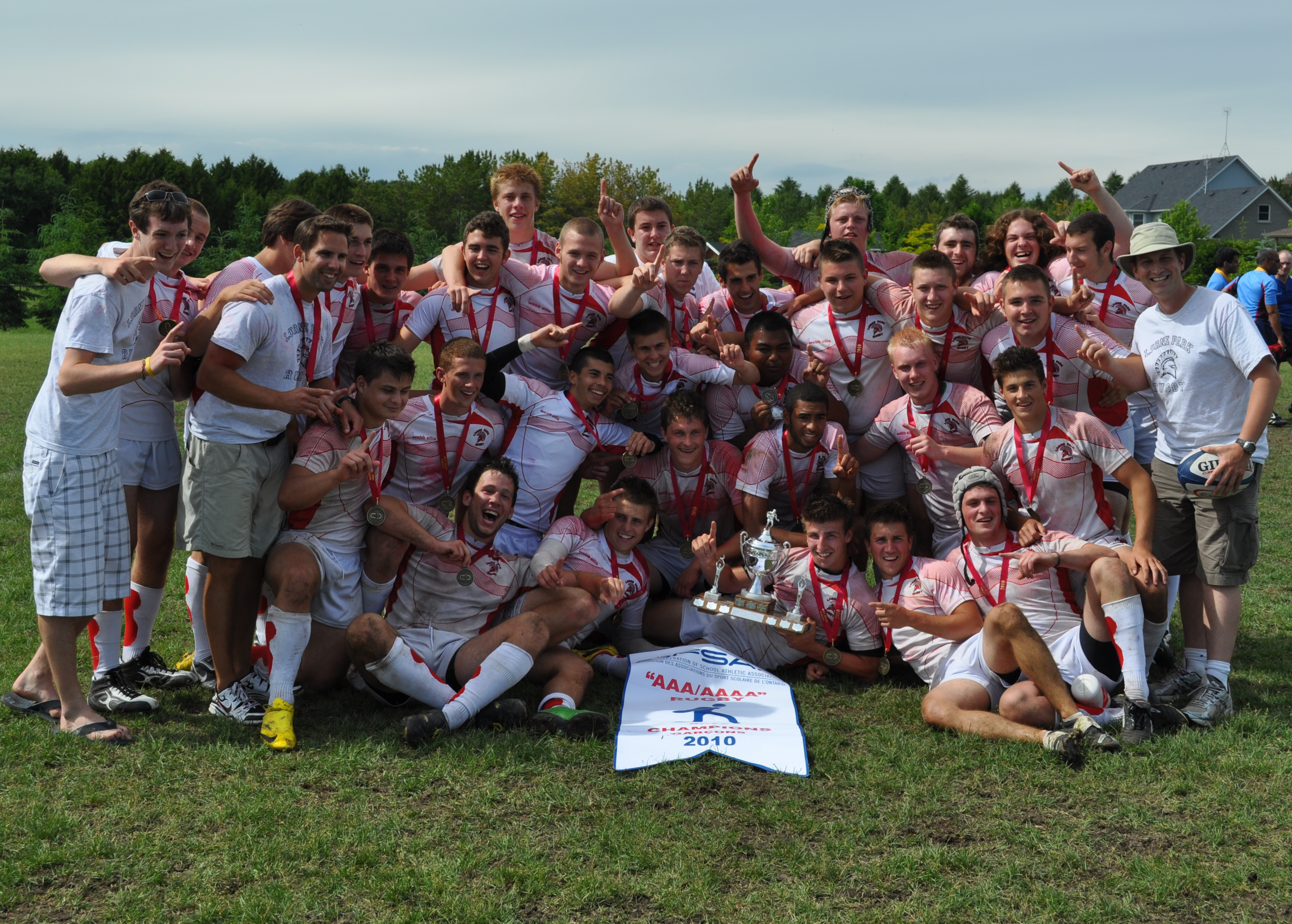
Lorne Park Spartans 2010 OFSAA Rugby Champions

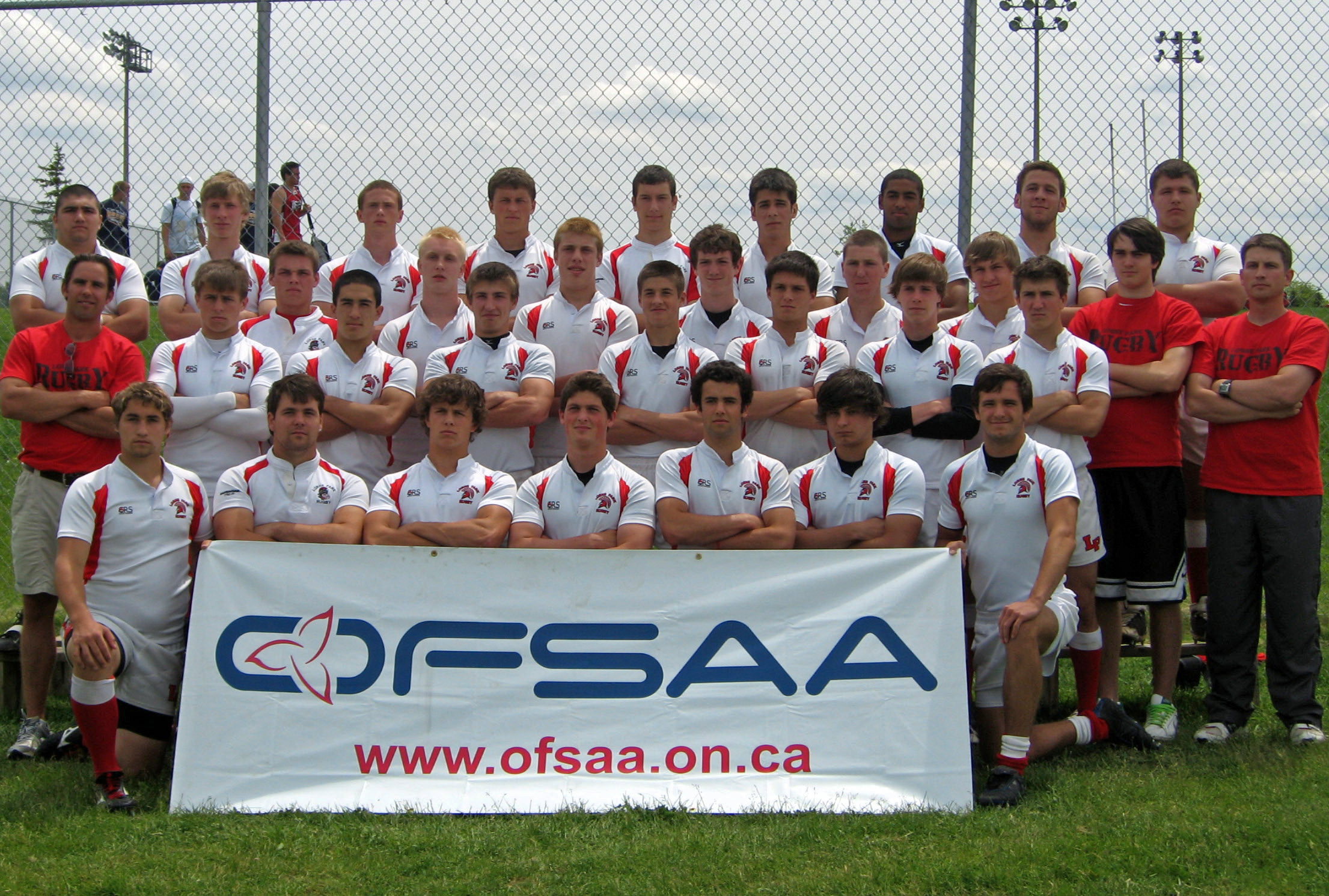
Lorne Park Spartans 2009 OFSAA Silver Medalist

=== Women's Lacrosse ===
In 2007 there were two teams, Seniors and Juniors. Both won ROPSSAA. The Seniors placed 13th in Midwest Schools Lacrosse Association (MSLA) at Erie and won Bronze in the (OFSAA-sanctioned) Provincial Cup in Peterborough. In 2006 and 2005 Lorne Park's Varsity, Junior Varsity and Rookie teams all swept ROPSSAA. As well, Varsity came 4th in the Provincial Cup tournament in both years and in 2006 also placed 8th in the MSLA at Detroit. 2008 saw a rebirth of the rookie team. 80 girls played on all 3 teams with the Varsity team winning their 4th ROPSSAA title in a row. The junior "A" team repeated as the Jr. Varsity Champions after an undefeated season while the junior "B" team won the bronze medal.

=== Baseball ===
Lorne Park's varsity baseball team won OFSAA baseball's Prentice Cup in 2005, competing at the Rogers Centre against top teams from across the province. This victory came after a defeat in the Prentice Cup Semi-Finals the year before.

== Notable alumni ==
Academia

- Nima Arkani-Hamed, physicist and professor at the Institute for Advanced Study, Cornell University, and Harvard University.
- Nanda Lwin, author and music historian, professor at Seneca College

Arts

- Ty Templeton, Comic-book artist and writer
- Mark Irwin, Hollywood Cinematographer
- Suzie McNeil, Vocalist
- Matthew Barber, singer and songwriter.
- Jacqueline Byers, actress

Government

- Bev Oda, former federal politician and cabinet minister
- Stephen Crawford, member of Ontario's Provincial Parliament, Minister of Public and Business Service Delivery and Procurement

Sports

- Todd Stansbury, athletic director for Georgia Tech Yellow Jackets sports program at the Georgia Institute of Technology.
- Klaus Wilmsmeyer, former NFL Football Player and Super Bowl Champion, San Francisco 49ers
- Brent Urban, NFL Football Player, Chicago Bears
- Robert Marland, Olympic gold medal winning rower
- Silken Laumann, Olympic medal winning rower
- Dylan Strome, NHL Hockey Player, Chicago Blackhawks 3rd overall draft pick 2015 NHL entry draft
- Ryan Strome, NHL Hockey Player, New York Islanders 5th overall draft pick 2011 NHL entry draft
- Michael McLeod, NHL Hockey Player, New Jersey Devils first round draft pick 2016 NHL entry draft
- Nick Paul, NHL Hockey Player, Ottawa Senators fourth round draft pick 2013 NHL entry draft
- Ryan McLeod, Hockey Player, Edmonton Oilers second round draft pick 2018 NHL entry draft
- Mike Hough, former NHL Hockey Player, Captain of Quebec Nordiques
- Ryan O'Marra, former NHL Hockey Player, New York Islanders first round draft pick 2005 NHL entry draft
- Nathan LaFayette, former NHL Hockey Player
- Steve Pinizzotto, former NHL Hockey Player
- Matt Kudu, former CFL Football Player
- Olivia Anderson, swimmer, represented Canada in 2017 World Aquatics Championships
- Jack Cassar, CFL Football Player

Technology

- Brad Templeton, ClariNet founder, Usenet pioneer, technology writer, public speaker and entrepreneur

== See also ==
- Education in Ontario
- List of secondary schools in Ontario
