= 2015 FINA World Junior Swimming Championships =

Fifth iteration of the World Junior Swimming Championships

- Host city: Singapore
- Date: August 25–30, 2015

The 5th FINA World Junior Swimming Championships, were held on August 25–30, 2015, in Singapore. The championships were for girls born in the years 1998–2001 and boys born in 1997–2000.

== Medal table ==
Rank	Nation	Gold	Silver	Bronze	Total
1	Australia	9	7	3	19
2	Russia	7	4	10	21
3	United States	6	13	7	26
4	Turkey	4	0	0	4
5	Canada	3	6	3	12
6	Japan	3	1	2	6
7	China	2	2	1	5
8	Italy	1	2	3	6
9	Brazil	1	2	1	4
10	Great Britain	1	1	5	7
11	Spain	1	1	3	5
12	Lithuania	1	0	1	2
12	New Zealand	1	0	1	2
14	Romania	1	0	0	1
14	Ukraine	1	0	0	1
16	Sweden	0	2	0	2
17	Hungary	0	1	0	1
18	Croatia	0	0	1	1
18	Egypt	0	0	1	1
18	Venezuela	0	0	1	1
Totals (20 entries)		42	42	43	127

== Medal summary ==
=== Boys' events ===
Event	Gold		Silver		Bronze	
Boys' freestyle
50 m	Kyle Chalmers; Australia	22.19	Michael Andrew; United States	22.36	Giovanni Izzo; Italy	22.55
100 m	Kyle Chalmers; Australia	48.47 CR	Maxime Rooney; United States	48.87	Felipe Souza; Brazil	49.30
200 m	Maxime Rooney; United States	1:47.78	Grant Shoults; United States	1:48.42	Ernest Maksumov; Russia	1:48.68
400 m	Grant Shoults; United States	3:48.91	Yang Jintong; China	3:50.05	Qiu Ziao; China	3:50.99
800 m	Yang Jintong; China	7:55.19	César Castro; Spain	7:57.21	Ernest Maksumov; Russia	7:57.40
1500 m	Brandonn Almeida; Brazil	15:15.88	Taylor Abbott; United States	15:16.35	César Castro; Spain	15:17.10
Boys' backstroke
50 m	Michael Andrew; United States	25.13 CR	Javier Acevedo; Canada	25.46	Mohamed Samy; Egypt; Robinson Molina; Venezuela	25.54
100 m	Robert Glință; Romania	54.30 CR	Michael Taylor; United States	54.64	Luke Greenbank; Great Britain	54.81
200 m	Hugo González; Spain	1:58.11	Michael Taylor; United States	1:58.39	Austin Katz; United States	1:58.51
Boys' breaststroke
50 m	Andrius Šidlauskas; Lithuania	27.99	Nicolò Martinenghi; Italy	28.03	Nikola Obrovac; Croatia	28.11
100 m	Anton Chupkov; Russia	1:00.19	Reece Whitley; United States	1:01.00	Andrius Šidlauskas; Lithuania	1:01.26
200 m	Anton Chupkov; Russia	2:10.19 CR	Matthew Wilson; Australia	2:11.23	Ippei Miyamoto; Japan	2:11.59
Boys' butterfly
50 m	Andrii Khloptsov; Ukraine	23.64	Michael Andrew; United States	23.84	Daniil Pakhomov; Russia	23.89
100 m	Daniil Pakhomov; Russia	52.28 CR	Vinicius Lanza; Brazil	52.88	Daniil Antipov; Russia	52.99
200 m	Nao Horomura; Japan	1:56.80	Daniil Pakhomov; Russia	1:56.93	Mike Thomas; United States	1:57.61
Boys' individual medley
200 m	Clyde Lewis; Australia	2:00.15	Dániel Sós; Hungary	2:01.78	Sean Grieshop; United States	2:01.83
400 m	Sean Grieshop; United States	4:15.67	Brandonn Almeida; Brazil	4:17.06	Hugo González; Spain	4:18.14
Boys' relays
4 × 100 m freestyle	Australia; Vincent Dai (50.03); Kyle Chalmers (48.41); Brayden McCarthy (49.66); Jack Cartwright (49.29)	3:17.39	United States; Ryan Hoffer (49.97); Daniel Krueger (49.50); Michael Jensen (50.51); Maxime Rooney (48.44)	3:18.42	Italy; Alessandro Bori (50.11); Giovanni Izzo (49.54); Ivano Vendrame (49.87); Alessandro Miressi (49.06)	3:18.58
4 × 200 m freestyle	United States; Grant Shoults (1:48.10); Maxime Rooney (1:46.55); Sean Grieshop (1:49.82); Grant House (1:49.29)	7:13.76 WJ, CR	Australia; Damian Fyfe (1:50.03); Clyde Lewis (1:48.34); Kyle Chalmers (1:50.13); Joshua Parrish (1:49.26)	7:17.76	Russia; Ernest Maksumov (1:48.99); Elisei Stepanov (1:48.81); Daniil Antipov (1:51.10); Aleksandr Prokofev (1:50.55)	7:19.45
4 × 100 m medley	Russia; Roman Larin (55.50); Anton Chupkov (59.84); Daniil Pakhomov (51.74); Vladislav Kozlov (49.36)	3:36.44 WJ, CR	United States; Michael Taylor (55.39); Reece Whitley (1:00.82); Michael Andrew (52.75); Maxime Rooney (48.55); Ryan Hoffer; Daniel Krueger	3:37.51	Australia; Clyde Lewis (55.85); Matthew Wilson (1:01.81); Brayden McCarthy (54.17); Kyle Chalmers (48.38)	3:40.21

=== Girls' events ===
Event	Gold		Silver		Bronze	
Girls' freestyle
50 m	Mariia Kameneva; Russia	25.12	Rikako Ikee; Japan	25.19	Shayna Jack; Australia	25.24
100 m	Taylor Ruck; Canada	53.92; CR	Penny Oleksiak; Canada	54.65	Arina Openysheva; Russia	54.78
200 m	Taylor Ruck; Canada	1:57.87; CR	Arina Openysheva; Russia	1:58.28	Hannah Cox; United States	1:59.28
400 m	Tamsin Cook; Australia	4:06.17; CR	Sierra Schmidt; United States	4:07.47	Linda Caponi; Italy	4:07.73
800 m	Sierra Schmidt; United States	8:27.55; CR	Simona Quadarella; Italy	8:29.79	Holly Hibbott; Great Britain	8:31.56
1500 m	Simona Quadarella; Italy	16:05.61; CR	Sierra Schmidt; United States	16:12.84	Gabrielle Kopenski; United States	16:21.15
Girls' backstroke
50 m	Gabrielle Fa'amausili; New Zealand	27.81; WJ, CR, NR	Minna Atherton; Australia	27.83	Danielle Hanus; Canada	28.26
100 m	Minna Atherton; Australia	59.58; WJ, CR	Claire Adams; United States	1:00.19	Bobbi Gichard; New Zealand	1:00.42
200 m	Minna Atherton; Australia	2:09.11; CR	Liu Yaxin; China	2:09.44	Taylor Ruck; Canada	2:09.49
Girls' breaststroke
50 m	Viktoriya Zeynep Gunes; Turkey	30.78	Sophie Hansson; Sweden	31.18	Katie Matts; Great Britain	31.66
100 m	Viktoriya Zeynep Gunes; Turkey	1:06.77; NR	Sophie Hansson; Sweden	1:07.77	Katie Matts; Great Britain	1:07.96
200 m	Viktoriya Zeynep Gunes; Turkey	2:19.64; WJ, CR, NR	Maria Astashkina; Russia	2:24.57	Sofiya Andreeva; Russia	2:24.88
Girls' butterfly
50 m	Rikako Ikee; Japan	26.28; CR	Penny Oleksiak; Canada	26.45	Mariia Kameneva; Russia	26.47
100 m	Rikako Ikee; Japan	58.28; CR	Penny Oleksiak; Canada	58.50	Gemma Cooney; Australia	58.98
200 m	Wang Siqi; China	2:08.24	Tamsin Cook; Australia	2:08.86	Hannah Kukurugya; United States	2:10.08
Girls' individual medley
200 m	Viktoriya Zeynep Gunes; Turkey	2:11.03; WJ, CR, NR	Mary-Sophie Harvey; Canada	2:12.37	Georgia Coates; Great Britain	2:12.74
400 m	Rosie Rudin; Great Britain	4:39.01; WJ, CR	Georgia Coates; Great Britain	4:39.94	Africa Zamorano; Spain	4:40.15
Girls' relays
4 × 100 m freestyle	Australia; Shayna Jack (54.91); Minna Atherton (55.93); Gemma Cooney (54.65); Lucy Elizabeth McJannett (54.38)	3:39.87; WJ, CR	Russia; Arina Openysheva (55.23); Maria Kameneva (54.76); Daria Mullakaeva (55.42); Daria S. Ustinova (54.50)	3:39.91	Canada; Penny Oleksiak (55.35); Rebecca Smith (55.46); Mary-Sophie Harvey (55.71); Taylor Ruck (53.74)	3:40.26
4 × 200 m freestyle	Australia; Tamsin Cook (1:58.16) CR; Lucy Elizabeth McJannett (1:59.68); Shayna Jack (1:59.76); Gemma Cooney (1:59.08)	7:56.68; WJ, CR	Canada; Penny Oleksiak (1:59.92); Rebecca Smith (1:59.41); Mary-Sophie Harvey (2:01.00); Taylor Ruck (1:56.71)	7:57.04	Russia; Arina Openysheva (1:58.90); Daria Mullakaeva (1:59.99); Valeriya Salamatina (1:59.11); Anastasiia Kirpichnikova (1:59.58)	7:57.58
4 × 100 m medley	Russia; Irina Prikhodko (1:00.77); Maria Astashkina (1:07.65); Polina Egorova (58.36); Mariia Kameneva (54.27)	4:01.05 WJ, CR	Australia; Minna Atherton (59.61); Ella Bond (1:09.54); Gemma Cooney (58.77); Shayna Jack (54.50)	4:02.42	Japan; Natsumi Sakai (1:01.91); Runa Imai (1:08.03); Rikako Ikee (58.07); Sachi Mochida (55.09)	4:03.10

=== Mixed events ===
Event	Gold		Silver		Bronze	
4×100 m freestyle relay	Canada; Javier Acevedo (50.42); Markus Thormeyer (48.77); Penny Oleksiak (54.83); Taylor Ruck (53.69)	3:27.71 WJ, CR	Australia; Jack Cartwright (50.34); Kyle Chalmers (48.89); Lucy Elizabeth McJannett (54.92); Shayna Jack (54.44)	3:28.59	Russia; Vladislav Kozlov (49.74); Igor Shadrin (49.58); Mariia Kameneva (54.77); Arina Openysheva (54.70)	3:28.79
4×100 m medley relay	Russia; Irina Prikhodko (1:00.53); Anton Chupkov (59.74); Daniil Pakhomov (51.33); Arina Openysheva (54.25)	3:45.85 WJ, CR	Australia; Minna Atherton (59.87); Matthew Wilson (1:01.16); Lucia Lassman (59.56); Kyle Chalmers (47.68)	3:48.27	United States; Michael Taylor (54.72); Michael Andrew (1:01.07); Cassidy Bayer (59.43); Stanzi Moseley (55.02)	3:50.24
