= Klaus Wilmsmeyer =

Canadian gridiron football player (born 1967)

No. 10, 4, 8
- Position: Punter

Personal information
- Born: December 4, 1967 (age 58); Mississauga, Ontario, Canada
- Listed height: 6 ft 2 in (1.88 m)
- Listed weight: 205 lb (93 kg)

Career information
- High school: Mississauga (ON) Lorne Park
- College: Louisville
- NFL draft: 1992: 12th round, 311th overall pick
- CFL draft: 1992: 5th round, 34th overall pick

Career history
- Tampa Bay Buccaneers (1992)*; San Francisco 49ers (1992–1994); New Orleans Saints (1995–1996); Miami Dolphins (1998); Carolina Panthers (1999)*
- * Offseason or practice squad member only

Awards and highlights
- Super Bowl champion (XXIX); PFWA All-Rookie Team (1992)

Career NFL statistics
- Punts: 398
- Punt yards: 16,336
- Longest punt: 63
- Stats at Pro Football Reference

Klaus Wilmsmeyer Jr. (born December 4, 1967) is a Canadian-born former American football punter in the NFL for the San Francisco 49ers, New Orleans Saints, and the Miami Dolphins. He was drafted by the Tampa Bay Buccaneers in the 12th round of the 1992 NFL draft.

Wilmsmeyer attended Lorne Park Secondary School and played college football at the University of Louisville.

At the University of Louisville, Wilmsmeyer was the team's field goal kicker. His 52-yard field goal in 1989 is tied for the longest in school history.

As an NFL punter, Wilmsmeyer was part of the San Francisco 49ers team from 1992 to 1994, where he won Super Bowl XXIX over the San Diego Chargers.

After leaving San Francisco, he punted for the New Orleans Saints from 1995 to 1996.

In 1998, he rejoined the NFL as a Miami Dolphin, playing there for his final year in professional football.

== NFL career statistics ==
Legend
	Won the Super Bowl
**Bold**	Career high

Year	Team	Punting									
Year	Team	GP	Punts	Yds	Net Yds	Lng	Avg	Net Avg	Blk	Ins20	TB
1992	SFO	15	49	1,918	1,701	58	39.1	34.7	0	19	2
1993	SFO	15	42	1,718	1,447	61	40.9	34.5	0	11	5
1994	SFO	16	54	2,235	1,933	60	41.4	**35.8**	0	18	3
1995	NOR	16	73	2,965	2,632	53	40.6	35.6	**1**	21	5
1996	NOR	16	87	3,551	2,825	**63**	40.8	32.5	0	16	9
1998	MIA	16	**93**	**3,949**	**3,350**	57	**42.5**	35.6	**1**	**23**	**13**
Career		94	398	16,336	13,888	63	41.0	34.7	2	108	37
