= Daniel Krueger =

American swimmer

Personal information
- National team: United States
- Education: U. of Texas ('22, Engineering)
- Height: 6 ft 7 in (201 cm)

Sport
- Sport: Swimming
- Event: 50, 100 yard freestyle
- Strokes: Freestyle
- Club: McFarland Spartan Sharks; Longhorn Aquatics
- College team: University of Texas at Austin
- Coach: Derrick O'Donnell (Sharks); Eddie Reese (U. Texas)
Medal record
Men's swimming
Representing the United States
Event	1st	2nd	3rd
World Junior Championships	0	2	1
Total	0	2	1
World Junior Championships
Silver medal – second place	2015 Singapore	4×100 m freestyle
Silver medal – second place	2015 Singapore	4×100 m medley
Bronze medal – third place	2017 Indianapolis	100 m freestyle
Junior Pan Pacific Championships
Gold medal – first place	2016 Maui	4×100 m freestyle
Gold medal – first place	2016 Maui	4×100 m medley
Representing the Texas Longhorns
Event	1st	2nd	3rd
NCAA Championships	3	1	1
Total	3	1	1
By race
Event	1st	2nd	3rd
100 y freestyle	0	1	0
4×50 y freestyle	0	0	1
4×100 y freestyle	2	0	0
4×100 y medley	1	0	0
Total	3	1	1
NCAA Championships
Gold medal – first place	2022 Atlanta	4×100 y freestyle
Gold medal – first place	2019 Austin	4×100 y freestyle
Gold medal – first place	2021 Greensboro	4×100 y medley
Silver medal – second place	2021 Greensboro	100 y freestyle
Bronze medal – third place	2019 Austin	4×50 y freestyle

Daniel "Danny" Krueger (born 1999) is an American competitive swimmer who specialized in freestyle events. He is a three-time medalist at the World Junior Championships with two silver and one bronze medal.

Born around 1999, Krueger grew up in greater McFarland, Wisconsin, the son of Steven and Julia Krueger and was largely homeschooled growing up. By the age of six, he began swimming with the McFarland Spartan Sharks, where through his high school years from 2010-2016, he swam for Shark's coach Derrick O'Donnell. Swimming with the Sharks at the age of 13, in July 2012, at the Bird Bath Invitational in Appleton, Wisconsin, he won the 100 freestyle in a time of 59.49.2, and competed on a sixth place 4x100 freestyle relay. He announced his intent to attend the University of Texas in May of 2017.

== 2016 Olympic trials ==
Krueger qualified and participated in the July, 2016 Olympic trials in Omaha, Nebraska in the 50 and 100 yard freestyle events. He placed 46th with a 22.89 in the 50 freestyle preliminaries and placed 43rd in the 100 freestyle with a time of 50.01, not making the finals of either event.

== University of Texas Austin ==
Majoring in Engineering, Krueger competed collegiately for the University of Texas at Austin, roughly from 2017-2022, where he was a three-time NCAA Champion, a nine-time All-American, a seventeen-time Big 12 champion, and a 2019, 2020 & 2021 CSCAA Scholar All-American. Krueger swam for Hall of Fame Coach Eddie Reese at the University of Texas, who was the schools head coach from around 1980-2024. After the 2020 season and the cancellation of the 2020 NCAA Division I Men's Swimming and Diving Championships, Krueger was named the Big 12 Conference Swimmer of the Year as a sophomore. In 2021 Krueger was named Big 12 Conference Scholar-Athlete of the Year. Krueger was part of the University of Texas's 2021 NCAA National Championship Team in swimming, and part of a Texas team that placed second at the NCAA National Championships in 2019, and 2022. In the off-season, Krueger swam for Longhorn Aquatics in Austin associated with the University of Texas.

== Honors ==
Krueger was a multi-time honoree as an All American Scholar as voted by the College Swimming Coaches Association of American (CSCAA), and was a member of the Big 12 Commissioner's Scholastic Honorary each of his years at Texas.

== See also ==
- NCAA Division I Men's Swimming and Diving Championships
- Texas Longhorns swimming and diving
- Texas Longhorns
