= 2016 Junior Pan Pacific Swimming Championships =

- Host city: Maui, Hawaii, United States
- Date(s): 24–27 August
- Venue(s): Lahaina Aquatic Center
- Events: 34

The 2016 Junior Pan Pacific Swimming Championships were held from 24 to 27 August 2016 at Lahaina Aquatic Center in Maui, Hawaii, United States. Competition was conducted in a long course (50 metre) pool with finals contested in an A-final and B-final format with medalists determined from the A-final. This continued the nomenclature used for the 2014 edition.

== Results ==
=== Men ===
Event	Gold		Silver		Bronze	
50 m freestyle	Jack Cartwright; Australia	22.28	Jack Franzman; United States	22.68	Ryan Hoffer; United States	22.77
100 m freestyle	Jack Cartwright; Australia	49.14	Cameron Craig; United States	49.41	Louis Townsend; Australia	49.58
200 m freestyle	Jack Cartwright; Australia	1:47.68; CR	Louis Townsend; Australia	1:47.73	Drew Kibler; United States	1:49.04
400 m freestyle	Andrew Abruzzo; United States	3:53.39	Trey Freeman; United States	3:54.12	Jacob Vincent; Australia	3:54.14
800 m freestyle	Bobby Finke; United States	7:55.16; CR	Andrew Abruzzo; United States	7:59.76	Jacob Vincent; Australia	8:01.86
1500 m freestyle	Bobby Finke; United States	15:05.29; CR	Andrew Abruzzo; United States	15:20.62	Atsuya Yoshida; Japan	15:27.61
100 m backstroke	Michael Taylor; United States	54.21	Cameron Craig; United States	54.74	Leon McAllister; Australia	56.14
200 m backstroke	Michael Taylor; United States	1:57.39	Austin Katz; United States	1:59.91	Matthew Mac; Canada	2:02.15
100 m breaststroke	Jacob Montague; United States	1:00.68	Matthew Wilson; Australia	1:00.91	Reece Whitley; United States	1:00.95
200 m breaststroke	Ippei Miyamoto; Japan	2:10.51	Matthew Wilson; Australia	2:11.33	Daniel Roy; United States	2:12.17
100 m butterfly	Nao Horomura; Japan	52.61	Cameron Craig; United States	52.63	Noah Lense; United States	53.35
200 m butterfly	Nao Horomura; Japan	1:57.01	Yuya Sakamoto; Japan	1:57.90	Sam Pomajevich; United States	1:58.22
200 m individual medley	Juran Mizohata; Japan	2:01.35	Tomoya Takeuchi; Japan	2:02.00	Charlie Swanson; United States	2:02.57
400 m individual medley	Sean Grieshop; United States	4:16.05	Charlie Swanson; United States	4:17.37	Tomoya Takeuchi; Japan	4:19.13
4×100 m freestyle relay	United States; Ryan Hoffer (50.17); Daniel Krueger (49.14); Cameron Craig (49.06); Drew Kibler (49.30)	3:17.67; CR	Australia; Jack Cartwright (49.15); Louis Townsend (49.72); Elijah Winnington (50.55); Matthew Wilson (50.23)	3:19.65	Canada; Mehdi Ayoubi (50.76); Ian Mackinnon (50.53); Alexandre Perreault (51.02); Stephen Calkins (50.03)	3:22.34
4×200 m freestyle relay	Australia; Louis Townsend (1:50.29); Elijah Winnington (1:50.80); Daniel Jacobson (1:51.11); Jack Cartwright (1:48.21)	7:20.41	United States; Trey Freeman (1:50.36); Drew Kibler (1:49.87); Andrew Abruzzo (1:51.74); Sean Grieshop (1:50.76)	7:22.73	Canada; Colin Gilbert (1:51.46); Ian Mackinnon (1:50.22); Brian Palaschuk (1:51.76); Josh Zakala (1:50.41)	7:23.85
4×100 m medley relay	United States; Michael Taylor (54.21); Jacob Montague (1:00.49); Cameron Craig (53.25); Daniel Krueger (49.97)	3:37.92	Japan; Tomoya Takeuchi (57.31); Ippei Miyamoto (1:01.57); Nao Horomura (52.03); Juran Mizohata (49.46)	3:40.37	Australia; Leon MacAllister (56.48); Matthew Wilson (1:02.13); Jordan Brunt (53.78); Jack Cartwright (49.14)	3:41.53

=== Women ===
Event	Gold		Silver		Bronze	
50 m freestyle	Anya Goeders; United States	24.85	Marta Ciesla; United States	25.18	Gabrielle Fa'amausili; New Zealand	25.36
100 m freestyle	Isabel Ivey; United States	54.95	Rebecca Smith; Canada	55.06	Liu Zixuan; China	55.42
200 m freestyle	Li Bingjie; China	1:58.23	Rebecca Smith; Canada	1:58.90	Isabel Ivey; United States	1:58.94
400 m freestyle	Li Bingjie; China	4:07.52	Courtney Harnish; United States	4:09.45	Ariarne Titmus; Australia	4:09.81
800 m freestyle	Li Bingjie; China	8:28.12	Joy Field; United States	8:31.21	Olivia Anderson; Canada	8:32.84
1500 m freestyle	Joy Field; United States	16:14.79	Olivia Anderson; Canada	16:18.66	Erica Sullivan; United States	16:28.75
100 m backstroke	Minna Atherton; Australia	1:00.45; CR	Lucie Nordmann; United States	1:00.55	Kaylee McKeown; Australia	1:01.01
200 m backstroke	Kaylee McKeown; Australia	2:10.01	Lucie Nordmann; United States	2:10.20	Minna Atherton; Australia	2:10.53
100 m breaststroke	Zoe Bartel; United States	1:07.87	Allie Raab; United States	1:07.95	Kelsey Wog; Canada	1:08.02
200 m breaststroke	Zoe Bartel; United States	2:25.46; CR	Kelsey Wog; Canada	2:26.51	Allie Raab; United States	2:26.83
100 m butterfly	Eva Merrell; United States	58.78	Rebecca Smith; Canada	58.84	Gemma Cooney; Australia	58.97
200 m butterfly	Cassidy Bayer; United States	2:08.48; CR	Laura Taylor; Australia	2:12.20	Maia Nishimura; Japan	2:12.97
200 m individual medley	Mary-Sophie Harvey; Canada	2:12.39	Alexandra Walsh; United States	2:13.14	Margaret Aroesty; United States	2:13.23
400 m individual medley	Sarah Darcel; Canada	4:39.83	Brooke Forde; United States	4:40.98	Mary-Sophie Harvey; Canada	4:42.49
4×100 m freestyle relay	United States; Grace Ariola (55.81); Lauren Pitzer (56.09); Eva Merrell (55.79); Isabel Ivey (55.27)	3:42.70	Canada; Rebecca Smith (55.41); Mary-Sophie Harvey (55.82); Kayla Sanchez (56.34); Sarah Darcel (55.27)	3:42.84	Australia; Minna Atherton (56.70); Gemma Cooney (55.78); Kirrily Siebenhausen (56.73); Julia Hawkins (56.16)	3:45.37
4×200 m freestyle relay	United States; Lauren Pitzer; Courtney Harnish; Brooke Forde (2:01.44); Isabel Ivey (2:00.01)	8:02.88	Australia; Ariarne Titmus (2:00.13); Gemma Cooney (2:01.52); Mikayla Messer (2:02.69); Laura Taylor (2:01.09)	8:05.43	Japan; Karin Takemura (2:01.72); Natsumi Shibata (2:03.03); Anna Sasaki (2:03.49); Rio Shirai (1:59.88)	8:08.12
4×100 m medley relay	United States; Lucie Nordmann (1:01.22); Zoe Bartel (1:07.89); Eva Merrell (58.97); Isabel Ivey (54.74)	4:02.82; CR	Canada; Danielle Hanus; Kelsey Wog; Rebecca Smith (58.33); Sarah Darcel (55.36)	4:03.42	Australia; Minna Atherton (1:00.33); Sarah Beale (1:11.44); Gemma Cooney (58.57); Julia Hawkins (56.36)	4:06.70

== Medal table ==
* Host nation (United States)

Rank	Nation	Gold	Silver	Bronze	Total
1	United States*	19	18	11	48
2	Australia	6	6	11	23
3	Japan	4	3	4	11
4	China	3	0	1	4
5	Canada	2	7	6	15
6	New Zealand	0	0	1	1
Totals (6 entries)		34	34	34	102

== Championships records set ==
The following Championships records were set during the course of competition.

Day	Date	Event	Stage	Time	Name	Country
1	24 August	200 m freestyle (men)	Final	1:47.68	Jack Cartwright	Australia
1	24 August	100 m backstroke (women)	Final	1:00.45	Minna Atherton	Australia
1	24 August	200 m butterfly (women)	Final	2:08.48	Cassidy Bayer	United States
1	24 August	1500 m freestyle (men)	Final	15:05.29	Bobby Finke	United States
2	25 August	100 m freestyle (men)	Heats	48.91	Jack Cartwright	Australia
2	25 August	100 m breaststroke (women)	Heats	1:07.82	Zoe Bartel	United States
3	26 August	200 m backstroke (women)	Heats	2:09.59	Lucie Nordmann	United States
3	26 August	4×100 m freestyle relay (men)	Final	3:17.67	Ryan Hoffer (50.17); Daniel Krueger (49.14); Cameron Craig (49.06); Drew Kibler (49.30)	United States
4	27 August	200 m breaststroke (women)	Final	2:25.46	Zoe Bartel	United States
4	27 August	800 m freestyle (men)	Final	7:55.16	Bobby Finke	United States
4	27 August	4×100 m medley relay (women)	Final	4:02.82	Lucie Nordmann (1:01.22); Zoe Bartel (1:07.89); Eva Merrell (58.97); Isabel Ivey (54.74)	United States
