= Brent Urban =

Canadian gridiron football player (born 1991)

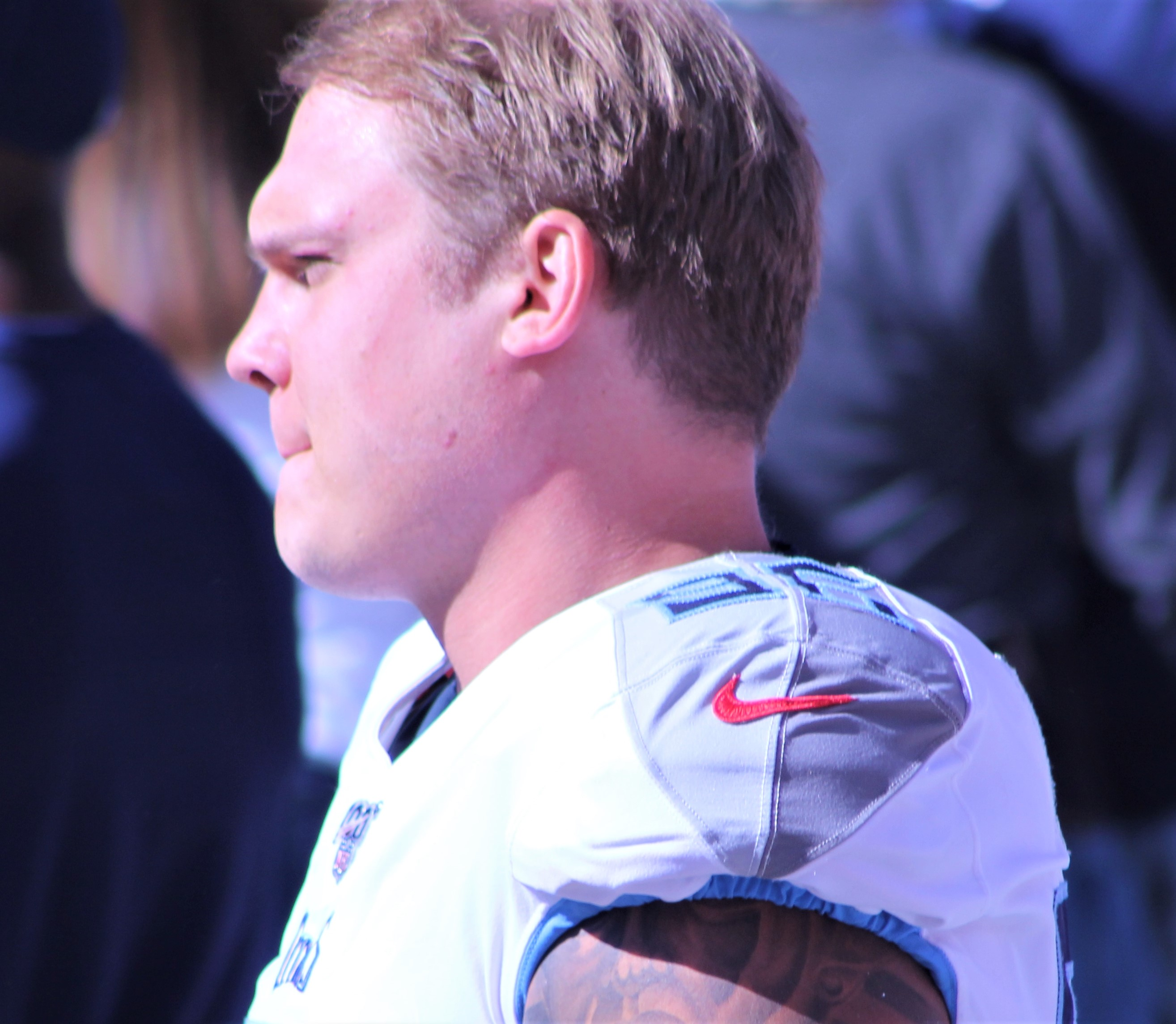
- Urban with the Tennessee Titans in 2019

Profile
- Position: Defensive end

Personal information
- Born: May 5, 1991 (age 35); Mississauga, Ontario, Canada
- Listed height: 6 ft 7 in (2.01 m)
- Listed weight: 309 lb (140 kg)

Career information
- High school: Lorne Park (Mississauga)
- College: Virginia (2009–2013)
- NFL draft: 2014: 4th round, 134th overall pick
- CFL draft: 2013: 2nd round, 15th overall pick

Career history
- Baltimore Ravens (2014–2018); Tennessee Titans (2019); Chicago Bears (2019–2020); Dallas Cowboys (2021); Baltimore Ravens (2022–2025)

Career NFL statistics as of 2025
- Total tackles: 189
- Sacks: 10.5
- Fumble recoveries: 1
- Pass deflections: 16
- Stats at Pro Football Reference

Brent Urban (born May 5, 1991) is a Canadian professional football defensive end. He was selected by the Baltimore Ravens in the fourth round of the 2014 NFL draft. He played college football for the Virginia Cavaliers.

== Early life ==
Urban was a notable player on one of the best international ice hockey teams before taking up football. At 15, he played alongside four future NHL draftees on the 2006 AAA Mississauga Ice Dogs team that won the Ontario bantam championship and went on to compete internationally.

He attended Lorne Park Secondary School in Mississauga, Ontario. As a freshman, he began playing Canadian football. As a junior, he had 16 tackles for loss, 10 tackles, and eight pass break-ups. He was a two-time Toronto Star All-Star selection for the football team.

He was considered a two-star recruit by Rivals.com.

== College career ==
Urban accepted a football scholarship from the University of Virginia. As a redshirt freshman in 2010, he appeared in only three games as a backup defensive end in a 4-3 defense, after suffering a torn left ACL and did not record any statistics.

As a sophomore in 2011, he appeared in all 13 games as a backup defensive end and defensive tackle. He registered 15 tackles, including 2.5 for loss. He underwent wrist surgery at the end of the season.

As a junior in 2012, he was switched to defensive tackle and started in all 12 games. He totaled 20 tackles, including 2.5 for loss, two sacks, one forced fumble and one fumble recovery for a touchdown. He had 2 passes defensed, one forced fumble and one fumble recovery, returning it 16 yards for a touchdown in the season finale against Virginia Tech.

As a senior in 2013, he was the starter at defensive tackle. He suffered a high right ankle sprain in the sixth game against the University of Maryland, that forced him to miss the next 4 contests. He recorded 8 starts, 40 tackles, 11.5 for loss (second on the team), one sack, and led the nation's defensive linemen with nine passes broken up despite not playing a full season. He had 4 tackles for loss in the fourth game against the University of Pittsburgh. He underwent ankle surgery at the end of the season.

== Professional career ==
=== Pre-draft ===
Pre-draft measurables
| Height | Weight | Arm length | Hand span |
|---|---|---|---|
| 6 ft 6 5/8 in (2.00 m) | 295 lb (134 kg) | 34 1/4 in (0.87 m) | 9 3/4 in (0.25 m) |
All values from NFL Combine

Urban was selected by the Hamilton Tiger-Cats of the Canadian Football League (CFL) in the second round, 15th overall, of the 2013 CFL draft. The club would hold his rights if/when he decided to play in the CFL.

=== Baltimore Ravens ===
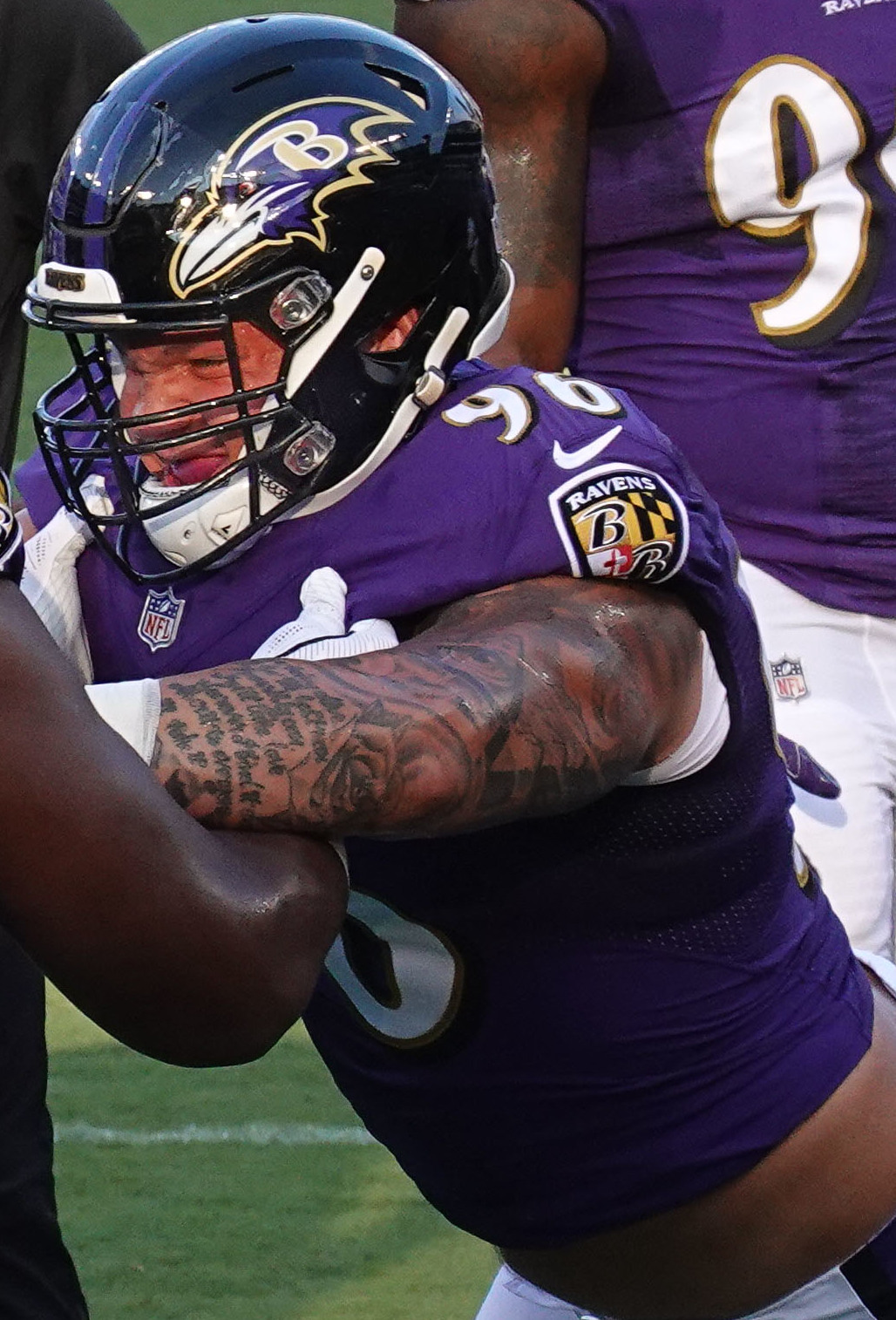
Urban with the Baltimore Ravens in 2018

Urban was selected by the Baltimore Ravens in the fourth round (134th overall) of the 2014 NFL draft, after dropping because of his injury history. Urban is the 26th Canadian to ever be drafted to the NFL. As a rookie, he played at defensive end in a 3-4 defense. He sustained a torn ACL in training camp. He was placed on injured reserve on August 25, 2014.

On August 8, 2015, Urban tore his biceps muscle in training camp and was placed on injured reserve with the designation to return. He returned to practice on November 9 and was officially added to the active roster on November 25, 2015. In his first NFL game in Week 12 against the Cleveland Browns, Urban blocked a potential game-winning field goal as time expired, while teammate Will Hill recovered it and returned it for the game-winning touchdown. He appeared in the last 6 games of the season as a backup defensive end, making 11 tackles and one sack.

In 2016, Urban played in all 16 games as a backup defensive end, recording 10 tackles, 2 sacks and two passes defended.

In 2017, he started the first 3 games at right defensive end. In Week 3, he suffered a Lisfranc foot injury which required surgery. He was placed on injured reserve on September 27, 2017.

On March 6, 2018, Urban signed a one-year contract extension with the Ravens for $2.35 million. He started all 16 games at right defensive end, posting 27 combined tackles, 0.5 sacks, and two passes defensed.

=== Tennessee Titans ===
On April 26, 2019, Urban signed with the Tennessee Titans, reuniting with defensive coordinator Dean Pees, who had the same role with the Ravens. He was released on October 19, 2019. He appeared in 4 games as a backup defensive end in a 3-4 defense, making 4 tackles and 3 quarterback pressures.

=== Chicago Bears ===
On October 21, 2019, two days after being released by the Titans, Urban signed with the Chicago Bears, to replace injured defensive end Akiem Hicks. He appeared in the final 9 games of the season as a backup defensive end in a 3-4 defense, tallying 16 tackles.

Urban re-signed with the Bears on March 26, 2020. He appeared in 16 games, starting the last 8 at defensive end in place of an injured Roy Robertson-Harris, while making 36 tackles, 2.5 sacks, 4 quarterback hurries and one pass defensed.

=== Dallas Cowboys ===
On March 22, 2021, Urban signed a one-year deal with the Dallas Cowboys, to play defensive tackle in a 4-3 defense. He was placed on injured reserve on October 26.

=== Baltimore Ravens (second stint) ===
On May 20, 2022, Urban signed with the Ravens. He was released during the final roster cuts on August 30 in a "handshake deal", to be re-signed the next day after rookie linebacker David Ojabo was placed on injured reserve. Urban was the backup behind defensive tackle Calais Campbell, collecting 21 tackles and one sack in 16 games.

On February 15, 2023, Urban re-signed with the Ravens. He played in 17 games with three starts, recording 22 tackles and a career-high three sacks.

On March 13, 2024, Urban re-signed with the Ravens.

On August 2, 2025, Urban re-signed with the Ravens. He was released as part of final roster cuts and re-signed to the practice squad the next day. He was promoted to the active roster on September 27.

== NFL career statistics ==
Legend
| **Bold** | Career high |

Accurate as of the conclusion of the 2025 NFL season

=== Regular season ===
| Year | Team | Games | | Tackles | | | | | Interceptions | | | | | Fumbles | | | |
| Year | Team | GP | GS | Cmb | Solo | Ast | Sck | TFL | Int | Yds | TD | Lng | PD | FF | FR | Yds | TD |
|---|---|---|---|---|---|---|---|---|---|---|---|---|---|---|---|---|---|
| 2014 | BAL | 0 | 0 | Did not play due to injury | | | | | | | | | | | | | |
| 2015 | BAL | 6 | 0 | 11 | 6 | 5 | 1.0 | 1 | 0 | 0 | 0 | 0 | 0 | 0 | 0 | 0 | 0 |
| 2016 | BAL | 16 | 0 | 10 | 7 | 3 | 2.0 | 3 | 0 | 0 | 0 | 0 | 2 | 0 | 0 | 0 | 0 |
| 2017 | BAL | 3 | 3 | 4 | 3 | 1 | 0.0 | 1 | 0 | 0 | 0 | 0 | 1 | 0 | 0 | 0 | 0 |
| 2018 | BAL | 16 | 16 | 27 | **17** | 10 | 0.5 | 2 | 0 | 0 | 0 | 0 | 2 | 0 | 0 | 0 | 0 |
| 2019 | TEN | 4 | 0 | 0 | 0 | 0 | 0.0 | 0 | 0 | 0 | 0 | 0 | 0 | 0 | 0 | 0 | 0 |
| 2019 | CHI | 9 | 0 | 16 | 10 | 6 | 0.0 | 1 | 0 | 0 | 0 | 0 | 2 | 0 | 0 | 0 | 0 |
| 2020 | CHI | 16 | 8 | **36** | **17** | **19** | 2.5 | 2 | 0 | 0 | 0 | 0 | 1 | 0 | 0 | 0 | 0 |
| 2021 | DAL | 6 | 4 | 3 | 0 | 3 | 0.0 | 0 | 0 | 0 | 0 | 0 | 1 | 0 | 0 | 0 | 0 |
| 2022 | BAL | 16 | 0 | 21 | 10 | 11 | 1.0 | 2 | 0 | 0 | 0 | 0 | **3** | 0 | 0 | 0 | 0 |
| 2023 | BAL | 17 | 3 | 22 | 16 | 6 | **3.0** | **5** | 0 | 0 | 0 | 0 | 2 | 0 | **1** | 0 | 0 |
| 2024 | BAL | 13 | 0 | 20 | 9 | 11 | 0.0 | 0 | 0 | 0 | 0 | 0 | 2 | 0 | 0 | 0 | 0 |
| 2025 | BAL | 15 | 5 | 19 | 7 | 12 | 0.5 | 3 | 0 | 0 | 0 | 0 | 0 | 0 | 0 | 0 | 0 |
| Career | | 137 | 39 | 189 | 102 | 87 | 10.5 | 20 | 0 | 0 | 0 | 0 | 16 | 0 | 1 | 0 | 0 |

=== Playoffs ===
| Year | Team | Games | | Tackles | | | | | Interceptions | | | | | Fumbles | | | |
| Year | Team | GP | GS | Cmb | Solo | Ast | Sck | TFL | Int | Yds | TD | Lng | PD | FF | FR | Yds | TD |
|---|---|---|---|---|---|---|---|---|---|---|---|---|---|---|---|---|---|
| 2014 | BAL | 0 | 0 | Did not play due to injury | | | | | | | | | | | | | |
| 2018 | BAL | 1 | 1 | 2 | **1** | 1 | 0.0 | **1** | 0 | 0 | 0 | 0 | 0 | 0 | 0 | 0 | 0 |
| 2020 | CHI | 1 | 1 | 2 | **1** | 1 | 0.0 | 0 | 0 | 0 | 0 | 0 | 0 | 0 | 0 | 0 | 0 |
| 2021 | DAL | 0 | 0 | Did not play due to injury | | | | | | | | | | | | | |
| 2022 | BAL | 1 | 0 | 1 | **1** | 0 | 0.0 | 0 | 0 | 0 | 0 | 0 | 0 | 0 | 0 | 0 | 0 |
| 2023 | BAL | 2 | 1 | **3** | **1** | **2** | 0.0 | 0 | 0 | 0 | 0 | 0 | 0 | 0 | 0 | 0 | 0 |
| 2024 | BAL | 2 | 0 | 0 | 0 | 0 | 0.0 | 0 | 0 | 0 | 0 | 0 | 0 | 0 | 0 | 0 | 0 |
| Career | | 7 | 3 | 8 | 4 | 4 | 0.0 | 1 | 0 | 0 | 0 | 0 | 0 | 0 | 0 | 0 | 0 |
