= Reece Whitley =

American swimmer (born 2000)

Personal information
- National team: United States
- Born: January 3, 2000 (age 26) Lafayette Hill, Pennsylvania, U.S.
- Height: 6 ft 8 in (203 cm)
- Weight: 245 lb (111 kg) (2015)

Sport
- Sport: Swimming
- Strokes: Breaststroke
- Club: Penn Charter Aquatic Club
- College team: University of California, Berkeley
- Coach: Crystal Keelan
Medal record
Men's swimming
Representing the United States
Event	1st	2nd	3rd
World Junior Championships	0	5	0
Total	0	5	0
World Junior Championships
Silver medal – second place	2015 Singapore	100 m breaststroke
Silver medal – second place	2015 Singapore	4×100 m medley
Silver medal – second place	2017 Indianapolis	100 m breaststroke
Silver medal – second place	2017 Indianapolis	200 m breaststroke
Silver medal – second place	2017 Indianapolis	4×100 m mixed medley
Junior Pan Pacific Championships
Bronze medal – third place	2016 Maui	100 m breaststroke
Representing the California Golden Bears
Event	1st	2nd	3rd
NCAA Championships	0	4	2
Total	0	4	2
By race
Event	1st	2nd	3rd
100 y breaststroke	0	0	1
200 y breaststroke	0	1	0
4×50 y medley	0	1	1
4×100 y medley	0	2	0
Total	0	4	2
NCAA Championships
Silver medal – second place	2019 Austin	4×50 y medley
Silver medal – second place	2019 Austin	4×100 y medley
Silver medal – second place	2021 Greensboro	200 y breaststroke
Silver medal – second place	2021 Greensboro	4×100 y medley
Bronze medal – third place	2021 Greensboro	100 y breaststroke
Bronze medal – third place	2021 Greensboro	4×50 y medley

Reece Whitley (born January 3, 2000) is an American competitive swimmer specializing in the breaststroke. In 2019, he was named 2019 Pac-12 Men's Swimming Freshman of the Year. At age 15, he won the silver medal in the 100 meter breaststroke at the 2015 FINA World Junior Swimming Championships in Singapore, where he also finished 4th in the 200 meter breaststroke.

Whitley was named Sports Illustrated Kids' SportsKid of the Year for 2015.

== Personal life ==
Whitley swam for 5 season as an undergraduate at UC Berkeley. He graduated from William Penn Charter School in Philadelphia in 2018. He started taking swimming lessons at age 7 after failing a deep-water safety test. He also started playing basketball and baseball at age 7, but he stopped playing baseball after he broke his first swimming national age group record in 2012.
