= Swimming at the 2017 Summer Universiade – Men's 400 metre freestyle =

Men's 400 metre freestyle at the 2017 Summer Universiade
- Venue: National Taiwan Sport University Arena
- Location: Taipei, Taiwan
- Dates: 20 August (heats and final)
- Competitors: 43 from 31 nations
- Winning time: 3:45.96

Medalists
gold medal	Mykhailo Romanchuk	Ukraine
silver medal	Jay Lelliott	Great Britain
bronze medal	Grant Shoults	United States

The Men's 400 metre freestyle competition at the 2017 Summer Universiade was held on 20 August 2017.

== Records ==
Prior to the competition, the existing world and Universiade records were as follows.

World record	Paul Biedermann (GER)	3:40.07	Rome, Italy	26 July 2009
Competition record	Przemysław Stańczyk (POL)	3:46.72	Belgrade, Serbia	5 July 2009

The following new records were set during this competition.

Date	Event	Name	Nationality	Time	Record
20 August	Final	Mykhailo Romanchuk	Ukraine	3:45.96	UR

== Results ==
=== Heats ===
The heats were held on 20 August at 09:00.

Rank	Heat	Lane	Name	Nationality	Time	Notes
1	5	4	Jay Lelliott	Great Britain	3:48.30	Q
2	6	5	Mykhailo Romanchuk	Ukraine	3:48.73	Q
3	5	1	Serhiy Frolov	Ukraine	3:49.67	Q
4	6	8	Andrea Mitchell D'Arrigo	United States	3:49.84	Q
5	5	3	Matthew Hutchins	New Zealand	3:49.93	Q
6	6	3	Grant Shoults	United States	3:50.19	Q
7	6	2	Jeremy Bagshaw	Canada	3:50.89	Q
8	4	2	Adam Pålsson	Sweden	3:51.19	Q
9	5	8	Joris Bouchaut	France	3:52.22	
10	6	4	Kosuke Hagino	Japan	3:52.24	
11	5	2	Filippo Megli	Italy	3:52.38	
12	6	6	Ernest Maksumov	Russia	3:53.43	
13	5	7	Fabio Lombini	Italy	3:53.82	
14	6	7	Joshua Parrish	Australia	3:53.89	
15	5	5	Jan Micka	Czech Republic	3:55.16	
16	6	1	Giuliano Rocco	Brazil	3:55.61	
17	4	5	Alin Artimon	Romania	3:56.03	
18	5	6	Viacheslav Andrusenko	Russia	3:56.20	
19	4	3	Lucas Kanieski	Brazil	3:56.27	
20	4	8	Long Gutiérrez	Mexico	3:56.44	
21	4	6	Shuhei Suyama	Japan	3:56.65	
22	4	7	Yonatan Batsha	Israel	3:57.93	
23	3	6	Michael Mincham	New Zealand	3:58.90	
24	3	3	Thomas Liess	Switzerland	3:59.27	
25	3	2	Choi Min-woo	South Korea	3:59.76	
26	4	3	Jonathan Atsu	France	3:59.95	
27	3	5	Ruan Ras	South Africa	3:59.98	
28	3	8	Povilas Strazdas	Lithuania	4:00.82	
29	4	1	An Ting-yao	Chinese Taipei	4:02.56	
30	3	4	Eetu Piiroinen	Finland	4:02.60	
31	3	7	Chan Chun Hei	Hong Kong	4:07.79	
32	2	7	Christian Mayer Martinelli	Peru	4:11.39	
33	3	1	Matias Pinto Matta	Chile	4:14.04	
34	2	5	Muhammad Alamzah	Indonesia	4:15.15	
35	2	4	Ma Rixin	China	4:15.33	
36	1	4	Hendrik Ütt	Estonia	4:16.32	
37	1	5	Sander Paavo	Estonia	4:18.00	
38	2	6	Jux Keaton Solita	Philippines	4:19.54	
39	2	1	Anthony Ghosn	Lebanon	4:20.67	
40	2	8	Sherif Assi	Lebanon	4:21.60	
41	1	3	Musallam Al-Khadhuri	Oman	4:32.34	
42	1	6	Naif Al-Qasmi	Oman	4:33.63	
43	2	2	Randy Llantino	Philippines	5:09.63	
	2	3	Satrio Bagaskara Gunadi Putra	Indonesia	DNS	

=== Final ===
The final was held on 20 August at 19:02.

Rank	Lane	Name	Nationality	Time	Notes
1st place, gold medalist(s)	5	Mykhailo Romanchuk	Ukraine	3:45.96	UR
2nd place, silver medalist(s)	4	Jay Lelliott	Great Britain	3:48.88	
3rd place, bronze medalist(s)	7	Grant Shoults	United States	3:49.03	
4	8	Adam Pålsson	Sweden	3:50.86	
5	3	Serhiy Frolov	Ukraine	3:51.27	
6	1	Jeremy Bagshaw	Canada	3:52.82	
7	2	Matthew Hutchins	New Zealand	3:53.00	
8	6	Andrea Mitchell D'Arrigo	United States	3:57.37	
