= Olivia Anderson (swimmer) =

Canadian swimmer (born 1999)

Personal information
- Nationality: Canadian
- Born: 30 May 1999 (age 27)

Sport
- Sport: Swimming
Medal record
Women's swimming
Representing Canada
Junior Pan Pacific Championships
Silver medal – second place	2016 Maui	1500 m freestyle
Bronze medal – third place	2016 Maui	800 m freestyle

Olivia Anderson (born 30 May 1999) is a Canadian swimmer. She competed in the women's 1500 metre freestyle event at the 2017 World Aquatics Championships.
