= Green Glade Senior Public School =

Location
- 1550 Green Glade; Mississauga, Ontario, L5J 1B5; Canada; 43.5155°N 79.6103°W

Information
- School type: Middle school
- School board: Peel District School Board
- Superintendent: Mary Zammit
- Area trustee: Brad MacDonald
- School number: 1308
- Principal: Patricia Onderdonk
- Grades: 6-8
- Enrolment: 275 (2022)
- Language: English
- Colours: Green & Yellow
- Mascot: Gator
- Website: greenglade.peelschools.org

Green Glade Senior Public School is a middle school under the Peel District School Board located in Mississauga, Ontario. The school serves students from grade 6-8 in the Lorne Park area. The school also has an Extended French program which serves grade 7 & 8 students.
