= Björn Seeliger =

Swedish swimmer (born 2000)

Personal information
- Full name: Björn Markus Seeliger
- Nationality: Swedish
- Born: 11 January 2000 (age 26) Celle, Germany
- Height: 2.02 m (6 ft 8 in)

Sport
- Sport: Swimming
- College team: University of California, Berkeley
Medal record
Men's swimming
Representing Sweden
Event	1st	2nd	3rd
European Junior Championships	1	1	0
European Championships (LC)	0	0	1
Total	1	1	1
European Championships (LC)
Bronze medal – third place	2022 Rome	4×100 m mixed freestyle
European Junior Championships
Gold medal – first place	2018 Helsinki	50 m freestyle
Silver medal – second place	2017 Netanya	50 m freestyle
Representing the California Golden Bears
Event	1st	2nd	3rd
NCAA Championships	2	2	1
Total	2	2	1
NCAA Championships
Gold medal – first place	2021 Greensboro	4×50 y freestyle
Gold medal – first place	2021 Greensboro	4×100 y freestyle
Silver medal – second place	2021 Greensboro	50 y freestyle
Silver medal – second place	2021 Greensboro	4×100 y medley
Bronze medal – third place	2021 Greensboro	4×50 y medley

Björn Markus Seeliger (born 11 January 2000) is a Swedish swimmer. He was a junior champion in 50 m freestyle at the 2018 European Junior Swimming Championships and holds the Swedish record for 50 m backstroke. He was part of the Swedish team that won 4 × 100 m mixed relays at the 2019 FINA Swimming World Cup meet held in Berlin. He competed in the men's 100 metre freestyle event at the 2020 European Aquatics Championships, in Budapest, Hungary.

In Sweden, Seeliger represented Södertälje SS before he represented Stockholms KK.
