= Maxime Rooney =

American swimmer

Personal information
- Full name: Maxime Pholien Rooney
- National team: United States; Philippines
- Born: April 16, 1998 (age 28)
- Height: 6 ft 2 in (188 cm)
- Weight: 194 lb (88 kg)

Sport
- Sport: Swimming
- Strokes: Butterfly, freestyle
- Club: Pleasanton Seahawks
- College team: University of Florida; University of Texas
- Coach: Eddie Reese
Medal record
Men's swimming
Representing the United States
World Junior Championships
Gold medal – first place	2015 Singapore	200 m freestyle
Gold medal – first place	2015 Singapore	4×200 m freestyle
Silver medal – second place	2015 Singapore	100 m freestyle
Silver medal – second place	2015 Singapore	4×100 m freestyle
Silver medal – second place	2015 Singapore	4×100 m medley
World University Games
Gold medal – first place	2017 Taipei	4×100 m freestyle
Gold medal – first place	2017 Taipei	4×100 m medley
Silver medal – second place	2017 Taipei	4×200 m freestyle

Maxime Pholien Rooney (born April 16, 1998) is a retired American competitive swimmer who won the gold medal in the 200 meter freestyle at the 2015 FINA World Junior Swimming Championships in Singapore. Together with his teammates, he broke the junior world record in the 4 × 200 m freestyle relay.

At the senior 2015 National Championships (long course) in San Antonio, Rooney won the title in the 200 meter freestyle. His winning time of 1:47.10 was the former junior world record.

== Personal life ==
Rooney was born in Livermore, California. He attended Granada High School. Rooney is half Filipino and has dual citizenship.
