= Nick Albiero =

American swimmer (born 1999)

Nicolas Albiero (born 8 June 1999) is an American-Brazilian former competitive sprint swimmer. According to the NCAA in 2024, he had "one of the most decorated swimming careers in NCAA history, winning two Division I titles, five straight 200-yard butterfly Atlantic Coast Conference titles, 28 All-America honors and two ACC Swimmer of the Year awards."

Albiero competed for the national teams of both the USA and Brazil, including for the latter at the 2024 Summer Olympics. He competed in freestyle, backstroke and butterfly, over 50 to 200 metres. He announced his retirement from swimming in November 2025, aged 26.

Albiero was born in Louisville, Kentucky, to a family of Brazilian descent; his father, Arthur Albiero, was born in Brazil and was head swimming coach for the Louisville Cardinals. After competing at the 2017 World Junior Championships, Nick Albiero joined Louisville, where he swam collegiately from 2017 to 2022 and was 2021 NCAA champion in 200 butterfly and 200 medley relay. Shortly after the Tokyo Olympics in summer 2021, Albiero earned a spot on the US national team, retaining it until he decided to switch allegiance to Brazil in 2023. At the 2024 Brazil Olympic Trials he swam a personal best in 200 butterfly to go to the Paris Olympics. At Louisville, Albiero was named All-American Scholar-Athlete during his "super senior" year, as he continued study with a full-time MBA. While on the US national team, Albiero was the only openly gay man.
