= Grant Shoults =

American swimmer (born 1997)

Personal information
- National team: United States
- Born: June 6, 1997 (age 29)
- Height: 6 ft 0 in (183 cm)
- Weight: 190 lb (86 kg)

Sport
- Sport: Swimming
- Strokes: Freestyle
- Club: Mission Viejo Nadadores
- College team: Stanford University
- Coach: Bill Rose (Nadadores)
Medal record
Men's swimming
Representing the United States
World Junior Championships
Gold medal – first place	2015 Singapore	400 m freestyle
Gold medal – first place	2015 Singapore	4×200 m freestyle
Silver medal – second place	2015 Singapore	200 m freestyle
World University Games
Silver medal – second place	2017 Taipei	4×200 m freestyle
Bronze medal – third place	2017 Taipei	400 m freestyle

Grant Shoults (born June 6, 1997) is a retired American competitive swimmer who won the gold medal in the 400 meter freestyle at the 2015 FINA World Junior Swimming Championships in Singapore. He also won the silver medal in the 200 meter freestyle. Together with his teammates, he holds the junior world record in the 4 × 200 m freestyle relay.

Shoults also participated in the 2014 Junior Pan Pacific Championships in Maui, Hawaii.

He attends Santa Margarita Catholic High School in Southern California and committed to swimming at Stanford in college in 2016.

In addition, Shoults has won several CIF titles.
