= List of Ecuadorian records in swimming =

The Ecuadorian records in swimming are the fastest ever performances of swimmers from Ecuador, which are recognised and ratified by the Federation Ecuatoriana de Natation (FENA).

All records were set in finals unless noted otherwise.

== Long Course (50 m) ==
=== Men ===
Event	Time		Name	Club	Date	Meet	Location	Ref
50 m freestyle	22.34		Julio Santos Macias	Ecuador	22 July 2001	World Championships	Fukuoka, Japan	
100 m freestyle	50.63		Julio Santos Macias	PTC	9 September 2001	-	Guayaquil, Ecuador	
200 m freestyle	1:50.98	b	Tomas Peribonio	Ecuador	15 July 2015	Pan American Games	Toronto, Canada	
400 m freestyle	3:55.70	h	Tomas Peribonio	Ecuador	17 July 2015	Pan American Games	Toronto, Canada	
800 m freestyle	7:58.23		Esteban Enderica	Ecuador	2 October 2014	South American Championships	Mar del Plata, Argentina	
1500 m freestyle	15:08.57		Esteban Enderica	Ecuador	3 April 2016	South American Championships	Asunción, Paraguay	
50 m backstroke	26.42		Felipe Jaramillo	POS	13 December 2025	Diana Quintana Noboa Championships	Samborondón, Ecuador	
100 m backstroke	57.27		Steven Jaramillo	Ecuador	14 September 2026	South American Games	Santa Fe, Argentina	
200 m backstroke	2:02.87		Tomas Peribonio	Ecuador	18 March 2021	South American Championships	Buenos Aires, Argentina	
50 m breaststroke	28.74		Tomas Peribonio	Gator SC	26 June 2021	-	Mission Viejo, United States	
100 m breaststroke	1:04.26	not ratified	Tomas Peribonio	Gator SC	12 February 2021	Southern Zone South Sectional Championships	Sarasota, United States	
100 m breaststroke	1:02.90	h, not ratified	Tomas Peribonio	Ecuador	23 July 2023	World Championships	Fukuoka, Japan	
100 m breaststroke	1:02.21	h, not ratified	Tomas Peribonio	Ecuador	21 October 2023	Pan American Games	Santiago, Chile	
200 m breaststroke	2:18.10	h	Tomas Peribonio	Gator SC	9 April 2021	TYR Pro Swim Series	Mission Viejo, United States	
200 m breaststroke	2:17.02	#	Juan Diego León	TS Aquatics	31 July 2026	Futures Championships	Knoxville, United States	
50 m butterfly	24.77		William Birkett	Ecuador	24 November 2025 (Note: by official result source; 25 November 2025 by FEN source, a typo)	Bolivarian Games	Lima, Peru	
100 m butterfly	55.27		Ariel Troya	EDUC	7 April 2022	-	Guayaquil, Ecuador	
200 m butterfly	2:01.46	h	Esteban Enderica	Ecuador	30 July 2013	World Championships	Barcelona, Spain	
200m individual medley	2:00.07	h	Tomas Peribonio	Ecuador	24 July 2019	World Championships	Gwangju, South Korea	
400m individual medley	4:16.87		Tomas Peribonio	Gator Swim Club	11 April 2019	TYR Pro Swim Series	Richmond, United States	
4×50m freestyle relay	1:39.53		Anyelo Mendoza; Darian Herrera; Jesus Bravo; Leonardo Gonzalez	Manabi	13 December 2018	-	Samborondón, Ecuador	
4×100m freestyle relay	3:27.77		Felipe Delgado (50.59); Roberto Delgado (53.22); Julio Santos (51.48); Javier Santos (52.48)	Ecuador	23 July 1996	Olympic Games	Atlanta, United States	
4×200m freestyle relay	7:45.88		Macias Rubio (1:55.06); Anyelo Mendoza (1:57.80); David Farinango (1:57,38); Tomas Peribonio (1:55.64)	Ecuador	10 November 2018	South American Championships	Trujillo, Peru	
4×50m medley relay	1:50.85		Roberto Delgado; Franscisco Suarez; Andrés Vasconcellos; Felipe Delgado	Ecuador	8 May 1994	-	Pasadena, United States	
4×100m medley relay	3:54.56		Daniel Casey (1:00.90); Abraham Solano (1:06.32); Roberto Delgado (55.81); Felipe Delgado (51.53)	Ecuador	7 August 1999	Pan American Games	Winnipeg, Canada	

Legend: # – Record awaiting ratification by FEN; WR – World record; AM – Americas record;
Records not set in finals: h – heat; sf – semifinal; r – relay 1st leg; rh – relay heat 1st leg; b – B final; † – en route to final mark; so – swim-off; tt – time trial

=== Women ===
Event	Time		Name	Club	Date	Meet	Location	Ref
50m freestyle	25.36	h	Anicka Delgado	Ecuador	30 July 2021	Olympic Games	Tokyo, Japan	
100m freestyle	55.56	h	Anicka Delgado	Ecuador	28 July 2021	Olympic Games	Tokyo, Japan	
200m freestyle	2:04.14		Nicole Marmol Gilbert	ANC/BAJ	11 December 2009	-	Buenos Aires, Argentina	
400m freestyle	4:13.48		Samantha Arévalo Salinas	Ecuador	October 2014	South American Championships	Mar del Plata, Argentina	
800m freestyle	8:35.99	h	Samantha Arévalo Salinas	Ecuador	2 August 2013	World Championships	Barcelona, Spain	
1500m freestyle	16:23.30		Samantha Arévalo Salinas	Ecuador	5 October 2014	South American Championships	Mar del Plata, Argentina	
50m backstroke	29.76		Maria Contreras	Ecuador	23 November 2025	Bolivarian Games	Lima, Peru	
100m backstroke	1:04.32		Maria Contreras	Ecuador	14 May 2025	Pan American Championships	Medellín, Colombia	
200m backstroke	2:18.03	h	Nicole Marmol Gilbert	Ecuador	31 July 2009	World Championships	Rome, Italy	
50m breaststroke	32.50	h	Victoria Edgar	Bolles School Sharks	2 May 2025 (Note: by official result source; 5 February 2025 by FPN source, probably a typo)	TYR Pro Swim Series	Fort Lauderdale, United States	
100m breaststroke	1:11.97		Victoria Edgar	Bolles School Sharks	6 June 2025	-	Jacksonville, United States	
100m breaststroke	1:11.57	#	Victoria Edgar	Ecuador	16 April 2026	South American Youth Games	Panama City, Panama	
200m breaststroke	2:39.26		Juliana Banderas	REGA	6 April 2022	-	Guayaquil, Ecuador	
50m butterfly	26.66		Anicka Delgado	Ecuador	17 March 2021	South American Championships	Buenos Aires, Argentina	
100m butterfly	1:00.27	not ratified	Anicka Delgado	Ecuador	18 March 2021	South American Championships	Buenos Aires, Argentina	
200m butterfly	2:15.38		Elvira Demera	Ecuador	16 September 2026	South American Games	Santa Fe, Argentina	
200m individual medley	2:18.54	h	Samantha Arévalo Salinas	Hermanos Enderica	26 April 2013	Maria Lenk Trophy	Rio de Janeiro, Brazil	
400m individual medley	4:48.68		Samantha Arévalo Salinas	Ecuador	5 October 2014	South American Championships	Mar del Plata, Argentina	
4×50m freestyle relay	1:58.17		Yamilé Bahamonde; Karmen Gonzalez; Paola Toledo; Fernanda Buenaño	Luis Bajaña Sport Club	27 December 2002	-	Guayaquil, Ecuador	
4×100m freestyle relay	3:54.39		Sharon Bravo; Nicole Marmol; Samantha Arévalo; Yamilé Bahamonde	Ecuador	19 November 2013	Bolivarian Games	Trujillo, Peru	
4×200m freestyle relay	8:32.53		Nicole Marmol; Yamilé Bahamonde; Sharon Bravo; Samantha Arévalo	Ecuador	17 November 2013	Bolivarian Games	Trujillo, Peru	
4×50m medley relay	2:07.34		Sharon Bravo; Mayra Alava; Dara Bravo; Camila Rojas	Club Regatas	21 December 2013	-	Samborondón, Ecuador	
4×100m medley relay	4:27.85		Nicole Marmol; Samantha Arévalo; Sharon Bravo; Yamilé Bahamonde	Ecuador	20 November 2013	Bolivarian Games	Trujillo, Peru	

Legend: # – Record awaiting ratification by FEN; WR – World record; AM – Americas record;
Records not set in finals: h – heat; sf – semifinal; r – relay 1st leg; rh – relay heat 1st leg; b – B final; † – en route to final mark; so – swim-off; tt – time trial

=== Mixed relay ===
Event	Time	Name	Club	Date	Meet	Location	Ref
4×100m freestyle relay	3:40.02	Leonardo Gonzalez; Anicka Delgado; Tomas Peribonio; Ursula Demarquet	Ecuador	22 November 2017	Bolivarian Games	Santa Marta, Colombia	
4×100m medley relay	4:05.00	Steeven Jaramillo; Ricardo Vasconsellos; Anicka Delgado; Michelle Jativa	Ecuador	10 April 2019	-	Santiago, Chile	

Legend: # – Record awaiting ratification by FEN; WR – World record; AM – Americas record;
Records not set in finals: h – heat; so – swim-off

== Short Course (25 m) ==
=== Men ===
Event	Time		Name	Club	Date	Meet	Location	Ref
50 m freestyle	22.28		Felipe Delgado	Ecuador	2 April 1999	World Championships	Hong Kong, China	
100 m freestyle	49.04	r	Tomas Peribonio	Cali Condors	27 November 2021	International Swimming League	Naples, Italy	
200 m freestyle	1:48.48	h	Tomas Peribonio	Ecuador	7 December 2016	World Championships	Windsor, Canada	
400 m freestyle	3:48.97		Tomas Peribonio	Cali Condors	26 October 2020	International Swimming League	Budapest, Hungary	
800 m freestyle	7:54.53	†	Esteban Enderica Salgado	Ecuador	7 December 2014	World Championships	Doha, Qatar	
1500 m freestyle	14:51.93		Esteban Enderica Salgado	Ecuador	7 December 2014	World Championships	Doha, Qatar	
50m backstroke	25.97	=	Felipe Jaramillo	-	14 December 2024	Ecuadorian Championships	Samborondón, Ecuador	
50m backstroke	25.97	=	Juan Leon	-	28 June 2025	-	Quito, Ecuador	
100m backstroke	54.51		Tomas Peribonio	Estadio Espanol	9 September 2023	Copa España	Santiago, Chile	
200m backstroke	1:55.66		Tomas Peribonio	Cali Condors	4 September 2021	International Swimming League	Naples, Italy	
50m breaststroke	28.50		Juan Diego León	DSC	20 November 2025	Quito City and Diego Quiroga Championships	Quito, Ecuador	
100m breaststroke	1:00.67		Tomas Peribonio	Estadio Espanol	10 September 2023	Copa España	Santiago, Chile	
200m breaststroke	2:09.78		Tomas Peribonio	Cali Condors	26 October 2020	International Swimming League	Budapest, Hungary	
50m butterfly	24.65	†	William Birkett	Stipendium Hungaricum	8 November 2025	Hungarian Championships	Debrecen, Hungary	
100m butterfly	54.04		William Birkett	Stipendium Hungaricum	8 November 2025	Hungarian Championships	Debrecen, Hungary	
200m butterfly	1:58.17		Tomas Peribonio	Cali Condors	28 November 2021	International Swimming League	Eindhoven, Netherlands	
100m individual medley	54.92		Tomas Peribonio	Estadio Espanol	8 September 2023	Copa España	Santiago, Chile	
200m individual medley	1:55.32	h	Tomas Peribonio	Ecuador	11 December 2018	World Championships	Hangzhou, China	
400m individual medley	4:05.08	h	Tomas Peribonio	Ecuador	15 December 2018	World Championships	Hangzhou, China	
4×50m freestyle relay	1:35.68		George Simisterra (24.53); Tyrone Alvarado (23.73); Carlos Polit Carvajal (23.95); Juan Chavez (23.47)	Diana Quintana	20 December 2013	-	Quito, Ecuador	
4×100m freestyle relay	3:29.84		Felipe Delgado (51.96); Javier Santos (52.56); Roberto Delgado (54.44); Julio Santos (50.88)	Ecuador	29 December 1996	-	Guayaquil, Ecuador	
4×200m freestyle relay	7:46.12		Ivan Enderica; Mauricio Oramas; Santiago Enderica; Esteban Enderica	Federación Deportiva del Azuay	28 May 2011	-	Quito, Ecuador	
4×50m medley relay	1:48.27		Andres Paez; José Salazar; Diego Zambrano; Eliseo Ibañez	Club Rancho San Francisco	11 February 2012	-	Quito, Ecuador	
4×100m medley relay	3:51.83		Carlos Polit; Alex Solorzano; Marco Camargo; Juan Chavez	Federación Deportiva del Guayas	29 May 2011	-	Quito, Ecuador	

Legend: # – Record awaiting ratification by FEN; WR – World record; AM – Americas record;
Records not set in finals: h – heat; sf – semifinal; r – relay 1st leg; rh – relay heat 1st leg; b – B final; † – en route to final mark; so – swim-off; tt – time trial

=== Women ===
Event	Time		Name	Club	Date	Meet	Location	Ref
50m freestyle	25.50	h	Yamilé Bahamonde	Ecuador	12 April 2008	World Championships	Manchester, Great Britain	
100m freestyle	54.19	h	Anicka Delgado	Ecuador	14 December 2022	World Championships	Melbourne, Australia	
200m freestyle	2:01.49	h	Samantha Arévalo	Ecuador	16 December 2012	World Championships	Istanbul, Turkey	
400m freestyle	4:08.64	h	Samantha Arévalo	Ecuador	14 December 2012	World Championships	Istanbul, Turkey	
800m freestyle	8:23.72		Samantha Arévalo	Ecuador	4 December 2014	World Championships	Doha, Qatar	
1500m freestyle	16:13.35		Samantha Arévalo	-	3 September 2014	José Finkel Trophy	Guaratinguetá, Brazil	
50m backstroke	29.55		Diana Chang Ibarra	BAT	17 July 2009	-	Quito, Ecuador	
100m backstroke	1:02.67		Diana Chang Ibarra	Hermanos Enderica	22 December 2012	-	Samborondón, Ecuador	
200m backstroke	2:15.52		Nicole Marmol Gilbert	-	29 January 2006	-	Barcelona, Spain	
50m breaststroke	33.26		Valeria Naranjo	ENP	20 November 2025	Quito City and Diego Quiroga Championships	Quito, Ecuador	
100m breaststroke	1:11.11		Valeria Naranjo	ENP	19 November 2025	Quito City and Diego Quiroga Championships	Quito, Ecuador	
200m breaststroke	2:35.78		Samantha Arévalo	Hermanos Enderica	22 December 2012	-	Samborondón, Ecuador	
50m butterfly	26.04	h	Anicka Delgado	Ecuador	13 December 2022	World Championships	Melbourne, Australia	
100m butterfly	1:01.21	h	Yamilé Bahamonde	Ecuador	12 April 2008	World Championships	Manchester, Great Britain	
200m butterfly	2:15.47		Yamilé Bahamonde	-	4 September 2014	José Finkel Trophy	Guaratinguetá, Brazil	
100m individual medley	1:06.73		María León	Delfines SC	14 May 2022	-	Quito, Ecuador	
200m individual medley	2:20.42	h	Samantha Arévalo	Ecuador	18 December 2010	World Championships	Dubai, United Arab Emirates	
400m individual medley	4:39.20		Samantha Arévalo	-	3 September 2014	José Finkel Trophy	Guaratinguetá, Brazil	
4×50m freestyle relay	1:52.81		Sharon Bravo; Mayra Alava; Dara Bravo; Camila Rojas	Regatas	2 March 2012	-	Quito, Ecuador	
4×100m freestyle relay	3:58.65		Sofia Lopez; Samantha Fajardo; Sophia Forneris; Yamilé Bahamonde	Federación Deportiva del Guayas	27 May 2011	-	Quito, Ecuador	
4×200m freestyle relay	8:43.40		Sofia Lopez; Samantha Fajardo; Sophia Forneris; Yamilé Bahamonde	Federación Deportiva del Guayas	28 May 2011	-	Quito, Ecuador	
4×50m medley relay	2:06.07		Tatiana Banderas; Juliana Banderas; Maria Gualotuna; Micaela Mera	Regatas	11 May 2022	-	Quito, Ecuador	
4×100m medley relay	4:30.98		Yamilé Bahamonde; Veronica Faytong; Sofia Lopez; Samantha Fajardo	Federación Deportiva del Guayas	29 May 2011	-	Quito, Ecuador	

Legend: # – Record awaiting ratification by FEN; WR – World record; AM – Americas record;
Records not set in finals: h – heat; sf – semifinal; r – relay 1st leg; rh – relay heat 1st leg; b – B final; † – en route to final mark; so – swim-off; tt – time trial

=== Mixed relay ===
Event	Time	Name	Club	Date	Meet	Location	Ref
4×50 m freestyle relay	1:45.14	Ursula Demarquet; Guillermo Salazar; Andrea Pereira; Joseph Macias	Diana Quintana	12 December 2018	-	Samborondón, Ecuador	
4×50 m medley relay	1:57.57	Sebastian Macias; Guillermo Salazar; Ymile Bahamonde; Andrea Pereira	Diana Quintana	14 December 2018	-	Samborondón, Ecuador	

Legend: # – Record awaiting ratification by FEN; WR – World record; AM – Americas record;
Records not set in finals: h – heat; so – swim-off
