= Swimming at the 2023 Pan American Games – Men's 100 metre breaststroke =

Men's 100 metre breaststroke at the 2023 Pan American Games
- Venue: Aquatic Center
- Date: October 21, 2023
- Competitors: 27 from 19 nations

Medalists
Gold medal	Jacob Foster	United States
Silver medal	Noah Nichols	United States
Bronze medal	Miguel de Lara	Mexico

The men's 100 metre breaststroke competition of the swimming events at the 2023 Pan American Games were held October 21, 2023 at the Aquatic Center in Santiago, Chile.

== Records ==
World record	Adam Peaty (GBR)	56.88	Gwangju, South Korea	July 21, 2019
Pan American Games record	Felipe França Silva (BRA)	59.21	Toronto, Canada	July 17, 2015

== Results ==
KEY:	QA	Qualified for A final	QB	Qualified for B final	GR	Games record	NR	National record	PB	Personal best	SB	Seasonal best

=== Heats ===
The first round was held on October 21.

Rank	Heat	Lane	Name	Nationality	Time	Notes
1	3	4	Jacob Foster	United States	1:00.85	QA
2	2	4	João Gomes Júnior	Brazil	1:00.89	QA
3	4	4	Noah Nichols	United States	1:01.10	QA
4	4	3	Gabe Mastromatteo	Canada	1:01.37	QA
5	2	3	Raphael Windmuller	Brazil	1:01.43	QA
6	3	5	Jorge Murillo	Colombia	1:01.46	QA
7	3	3	Xavier Ruiz	Puerto Rico	1:01.67	QA
8	4	5	Miguel de Lara	Mexico	1:01.75	QA
9	4	6	Mariano Lazzerini	Chile	1:01.90	QB
10	2	5	James Dergousoff	Canada	1:02.19	QB
11	4	8	Tomas Peribonio	Ecuador	1:02.21	QB, NR
12	4	2	Andres Puente	Mexico	1:02.42	QB
13	3	6	Juan García	Colombia	1:02.77	QB
14	2	2	Gabriel Morelli	Argentina	1:03.08	QB
15	2	6	Juan Carrocia	Argentina	1:03.20	QB
16	3	7	Josué Domínguez	Dominican Republic	1:03.52	QB
17	4	7	Andres Martijena	Dominican Republic	1:03.64	
18	3	1	Tyler Christianson	Panama	1:03.73	
19	2	8	Vicente Villaneuva	Chile	1:03.80	
20	3	8	Maximiliano Cereceda	Chile	1:04.31	
21	2	7	Eric Veit	Venezuela	1:04.31	
22	4	1	Kito Campbell	Jamaica	1:05.08	
23	2	1	Adriel Sanes	Virgin Islands	1:06.13	
24	1	4	Mark-Anthony Thompson	Bahamas	1:07.18	
25	1	5	Samuel Williamson	Bermuda	1:08.13	
26	1	3	Nector Segovia	El Salvador	1:09.26	
27	1	6	Nikolas Sylvester	Saint Vincent and the Grenadines	1:13.11	

=== Final B ===
The B final was also held on October 21.

Rank	Lane	Name	Nationality	Time	Notes
9	6	Andres Puente	Mexico	1:01.18	
10	5	James Dergousoff	Canada	1:01.97	
11	4	Mariano Lazzerini	Chile	1:02.11	
12	7	Gabriel Morelli	Argentina	1:02.20	
13	2	Juan García	Colombia	1:02.29	
14	3	Tomas Peribonio	Ecuador	1:02.59	
15	8	Josué Domínguez	Dominican Republic	1:03.92	
16	1	Juan Carrocia	Argentina	1:05.03	

=== Final A ===
The A final was also held on October 21.

Rank	Lane	Name	Nationality	Time	Notes
1st place, gold medalist(s)	4	Jacob Foster	United States	59.99	
2nd place, silver medalist(s)	3	Noah Nichols	United States	1:00.43	
3rd place, bronze medalist(s)	8	Miguel de Lara	Mexico	1:00.90	
4	7	Jorge Murillo	Colombia	1:01.15	
5	5	João Gomes Júnior	Brazil	1:01.17	
6	6	Gabe Mastromatteo	Canada	1:01.39	
7	2	Raphael Windmuller	Brazil	1:01.62	
8	1	Xavier Ruiz	Puerto Rico	1:02.42	
