= Jimena Leguizamón =

Colombian swimmer (born 2005)

Personal information
- Full name: Jimena Leguizamón Leal
- National team: Colombia
- Born: 12 May 2005 (age 21) Bogotá, Colombia

Sport
- Sport: Swimming
- Strokes: Backstroke; individual medley
Medal record
Women's swimming
Representing Colombia
| Event | 1st | 2nd | 3rd |
|---|---|---|---|
| South American Games | 0 | 0 | 1 |
| Bolivarian Games | 2 | 0 | 2 |
| Junior Pan American Games | 0 | 1 | 1 |
| South American Youth Games | 2 | 3 | 0 |
| Total | 4 | 4 | 4 |
South American Games
| Bronze medal – third place | 2022 Asunción | 4×100 m medley |
Bolivarian Games
| Gold medal – first place | 2022 Valledupar | 200 m backstroke |
| Gold medal – first place | 2022 Valledupar | 4×100 m medley |
| Bronze medal – third place | 2022 Valledupar | 100 m backstroke |
| Bronze medal – third place | 2022 Valledupar | 200 m medley |
Junior Pan American Games
| Silver medal – second place | 2021 Cali-Valle | 200 m backstroke |
| Bronze medal – third place | 2021 Cali-Valle | 4×100 m medley |
South American Youth Games
| Gold medal – first place | 2022 Rosario | 100 m backstroke |
| Gold medal – first place | 2022 Rosario | 200 m backstroke |
| Silver medal – second place | 2022 Rosario | 50 m backstroke |
| Silver medal – second place | 2022 Rosario | 200 m medley |
| Silver medal – second place | 2022 Rosario | 4×100 m medley |

Jimena Leguizamón Leal (born 12 May 2005) is a Colombian competitive swimmer. At the 2022 Bolivarian Games, she won gold medals in the 200 metre backstroke and 4×100 metre medley relay and bronze medals in the 200 metre individual medley and 100 metre backstroke. At the 2022 World Aquatics Championships, she placed sixteenth in the 200 metre backstroke and became the first female Colombian swimmer to reach the semifinals stage of competition in the event at a World Aquatics Championships. She won the silver medal in the 200 metre backstroke at the 2021 Junior Pan American Games and two gold medals and two silver medals in individual events at the 2022 South American Youth Games.

== Background ==
Leguizamón was born 12 May 2005 in Bogotá, Colombia. She was diagnosed with asthma when she was 5 years old and started swimming to help mediate the condition.

== Career ==
=== 2021 ===
==== 2021 Junior Pan American Games ====
As a part of swimming competition at the 2021 Junior Pan American Games, conducted in Cali in November and December, Leguizamón won the silver medal in the 200 metre backstroke with a time of 2:16.85, won a bronze medal in the 4×100 metre medley relay with a final time of 4:16.51, placed fifth in the 100 metre backstroke with a time of 1:04.36, and placed eighth in the preliminaries of the 200 metre individual medley with a 2:24.22. In her heat of the 200-metre individual medley, she placed fourth with a time of 2:24.22, finishing over 10 full seconds ahead of fifth-place finisher and 2020 Olympian Jillian Crooks of the Cayman Islands. Following the Games, she won a gold medal in the 200 metre backstroke at the Junior South American Swimming Championships with a South American record time of 2:16.63 for girls under 18 years of age.

=== 2022 ===
==== 2022 South American Youth Games ====
At the 2022 South American Youth Games, held in Rosario, Argentina in April and May, Leguizamón won a total of two gold medals and three silver medals. She won her first set of medals on 28 April, the first medal was a silver medal in the 200 metre individual medley with a time of 2:21.51 and the second was a silver medal in the 50 metre backstroke with a time of 30.02 seconds. Her other three medals, she won over the following two days, first winning the gold medal in the 100 metre backstroke with a 1:03.65, then winning a silver medal as part of the 4×100 metre medley relay, followed by a gold medal in the 200 metre backstroke with a 2:15.38. She also placed fourth in the 4×100 metre mixed medley relay on 1 May.

==== 2022 World Aquatics Championships ====
In the 100 metre backstroke at the 2022 World Aquatics Championships, with pool swimming competition held at Danube Arena in Budapest, Hungary in June, Leguizamón placed 26th with a time of 1:03.16. Four days later, she swam a 2:16.38 in the preliminaries of the 200 metre backstroke and qualified for the semifinals ranking sixteenth. In the evening semifinals, she became the first female Colombian to compete in the semifinals stage of competition of the 200 metre backstroke at a FINA World Aquatics Championships, placing sixteenth with a time of 2:15.11.

==== 2022 Bolivarian Games ====
2022 Bolivarian Games
| Gold medal – first place | 4×100 m medley | 4:13.70 |
| Gold medal – first place | 200 m backstroke | 2:16.76 (GR) |
| Bronze medal – third place | 200 m individual medley | 2:21.78 |
| Bronze medal – third place | 100 m backstroke | 1:04.29 |

Nine days later, Leguizamón won her first medal in swimming competition at the 2022 Bolivarian Games, held in Valledupar, a bronze medal in the 200 metre individual medley with a time of 2:21.78. For her first medal the following day, she won the bronze medal in the 100 metre backstroke with a time of 1:04.29 in the final, finishing 0.56 seconds behind gold medalist McKenna DeBever of Peru and 0.46 seconds behind silver medalist Krystal Lara of the Dominican Republic. Her second medal of the day was a gold medal in the 4×100 metre medley relay, where she helped achieve a first-place finish in 4:13.70 along with relay teammates Valentina Becerra, Karen Durango, and Stefania Gómez. In her final event of the Games, the 200 metre backstroke the following day, she won the gold medal in a new Games record time of 2:16.76.

On 6 July, the day after the completion of the Games, Colombian newspaper El Tiempo dubbed Leguizamón as an emerging talent, specifically in regards to her potential to compete at the 2024 Summer Olympics.

==== 2022 World Junior Championships ====
Leguizamón was one of six Colombian swimmers who entered to compete at the 2022 FINA World Junior Swimming Championships, held in August and September in Lima, Peru. Starting on day one in the preliminaries of the 100 metre backstroke, she finished in a time of 1:04.46, ranking 18th across all preliminary heats and not advancing to the semifinals. On day two, she split a 1:04.47 for the butterfly leg of the 4×100 metre mixed medley relay, helping achieve an eleventh-place finish in 4:08.10. The next day, she placed fifteenth in the 200 metre backstroke with a time of 2:19.90. Day four of competition, she qualified for her first final of the Championships in the preliminaries of the 200 metre individual medley, where she ranked eighth with a time of 2:23.74, which was less than 10 seconds behind first-ranked Mio Narita of Japan. In the final, she increased her time to a 2:25.52 and placed eighth.

==== 2022 South American Games ====
2022 South American Games
| Bronze medal – third place | 4×100 m medley | 4:12.08 |

In August, Leguizamón was named to the Colombia roster in swimming for the senior 2022 South American Games, to be held in October in Asunción, Paraguay. For her individual events as part of pool swimming competition, she entered to compete in the 100 metre backstroke, 200 metre backstroke, and 200 metre individual medley. In the 200 metre individual medley on 2 October, she was the highest-placing female swimmer from Colombia in the final, finishing sixth with a time of 2:25.59. The following day, she qualified for the final of the 100 metre backstroke with a time of 1:04.10 in the morning preliminary heats. In the evening final, she lowered her time to a 1:03.94 and tied for fifth-place. Later in the same session, she won a bronze medal as part of the 4×100 metre medley relay, helping finish third in a time of 4:12.08. On the third day, she withdrew from the 200 metre backstroke prior to the start of competition.

=== 2023 ===
In March 2023, the world governing body for aquatics sports, World Aquatics, announced female swimmers, such as Leguizamón, would be age-eligible for the 2023 World Junior Swimming Championships and world junior records with an upper age cut-off of 18 years of age at the end of the 2023 year, meaning she would receive an additional year as a world junior following this change in upper age cut-off, which was previously set at 17 years of age for female swimmers.

== International championships (50 m) ==
| Meet | 50 back | 100 back | 200 back | 200 medley | 4×100 medley | 4×100 mixed medley |
|---|---|---|---|---|---|---|
Junior level
| PANJ 2021 (age: 16) | —N/a | 5th (1:04.36) | (silver) (2:16.85) | 8th (h) (2:24.22) | (bronze) (4:16.51) | |
| SAYG 2022 (age: 16) | (silver) (30.02) | (gold) (1:03.65) | (gold) (2:15.38) | (silver) (2:21.51) | (silver) (4:21.35) | 4th (4:04.70) |
| WJC 2022 (age: 17) | | 18th (1:04.46) | 15th (2:19.90) | 8th (2:25.52) | | 11th (4:08.10) |
Senior level
| WC 2022 (age: 17) | | 26th (1:03.16) | 16th (2:15.11) | | | |
| BvG 2022 (age: 17) | —N/a | (bronze) (1:04.29) | (gold) (2:16.76 GR) | (bronze) (2:21.78) | (gold) (4:13.70) | |
| SAG 2022 (age: 17) | | 5th (1:03.94) | | 6th (2:25.59) | (bronze) (4:12.08) | |

== Personal best times ==
=== Long course metres (50 m pool) ===
| Event | Time | Meet | Location | Date | Age | Ref |
|---|---|---|---|---|---|---|
| 50 m backstroke | 30.02 | 2022 South American Youth Games | Rosario, Argentina | 28 April 2022 | 16 | |
| 100 m backstroke | 1:03.12 | 7th Dominican Republic International Swim Open | Santo Domingo, Dominican Republic | 2 April 2022 | 16 | |
| 200 m backstroke | 2:14.53 | 7th Dominican Republic International Swim Open | Santo Domingo, Dominican Republic | 3 April 2022 | 16 | |
| 200 m individual medley | 2:19.66 | 7th Dominican Republic International Swim Open | Santo Domingo, Dominican Republic | 1 April 2022 | 16 | |

== See also ==
- Swimming at the 2021 Junior Pan American Games
