= Beach volleyball at the 2022 South American Youth Games =

Beach volleyball competitions at the 2022 South American Youth Games

- Beach volleyball pictogram
- Venue: Estadio Arena
- Dates: 28 April – 1 May 2022
- Competitors: 48 from 11 nations

Beach volleyball competitions at the 2022 South American Youth Games in Rosario, Argentina were held from 28 April to 1 May 2022 at the Estadio Arena in the La Rural cluster.

Two medal events were scheduled to be contested, a men's and a women's tournament. A total of 48 athletes (24 per gender and 12 teams per event) are scheduled to compete. Only athletes born between 1 January 2004 and 31 December 2007 were eligible to compete in each event.

== Schedule ==
P	Preliminary round	¼	Quarter-finals	½	Semi-finals	B	Bronze medal match	F	Final

Date Event	Thu 28 (16 matches)	Fri 29 (20 matches)		Sat 30 (14 matches)			Sun 1 (6 matches)		
Boys' tournament	P	P	¼				½	B	F
Girls' tournament	P	P	¼	½	B	F			

1. ^{†} Includes classification matches in both events (5th to 12th places).

== Participating nations ==
A total of 11 nations registered athletes for the beach volleyball event. Each nation was able to enter a maximum of 4 athletes (one team of two athletes per gender). As host nation, Argentina was able to register an extra team per gender in order to complete 12 teams in each tournament.

- Argentina (8 athletes)
- Bolivia (4)
- Brazil (4)
- Chile (4)
- Colombia (4)
- Ecuador (4)
- Paraguay (4)
- Peru (4)
- Suriname (4)
- Uruguay (4)
- Venezuela (4)

== Medal summary ==
A total of four nations won medals, with Brazil and Paraguay winning the men's and women's tournaments respectively.

=== Medal table ===
* Host nation (Host nation)

Rank	Nation	Gold	Silver	Bronze	Total
1	Brazil (BRA)	1	1	0	2
2	Paraguay (PAR)	1	0	1	2
3	Chile (CHI)	0	1	0	1
4	Argentina (ARG)*	0	0	1	1
Totals (4 entries)		2	2	2	6

=== Medalists ===
Event	Gold	Silver	Bronze
Boys' tournament	Brazil; Henrique Camboim; Pedro Sousa	Chile; Maximiliano Córdova; Martín Etcheberry	Paraguay; Ángel Palacios; Camilo Vargas
Girls' tournament	Paraguay; Denisse Álvarez; Fiorella Núñez	Brazil; Carolina Sallaberry; Nina Sichinel	Argentina; Morena Abdala; Maria Enríquez
