= 2021 South American Swimming Championships =

45th edition of South American Swimming Championships

XLV South American Swimming Championships
- Host city: Buenos Aires, Argentina
- Date: 16–19 March
- Venue: Parque Olímpico de la Juventud
- Events: 41

The 45th South American Swimming Championships were held from 16 to 19 March at the Parque Olímpico de la Juventud in Buenos Aires, Argentina.

== Participating countries ==
- Argentina
- Bolivia
- Brazil
- Chile
- Colombia
- Ecuador
- El Salvador*
- Guatemala*
- Guyana
- Haiti*
- Honduras*
- Mexico*
- Panama*
- Paraguay
- Peru
- Puerto Rico*
- Suriname
- Uruguay
- Venezuela

*Invitated countries

== Results ==
=== Men's events ===
Event	Gold		Silver		Bronze	
50 m freestyle	Lucas Peixoto (BRA); Alberto Mestre Vivas (VEN); Enzo Martinez Scarpe (URU) NR	22.44	none awarded		none awarded	
100 m freestyle	Lucas Peixoto (BRA)	49.36	Alberto Mestre Vivas (VEN)	49.43	Cristian Quintero (VEN)	49.60
200 m freestyle	Cristian Quintero (VEN)	1:50.22	Lucas Peixoto (BRA)	1:50.25	Pablo Vieira (BRA)	1:50.45
400 m freestyle	Murilo Sartori (BRA)	3:54.24	Pablo Silva Vieira (BRA)	3:54.46	Joaquín Vargas (PER)	3:55.54 NR
800 m freestyle	Juan Morales (COL)	8:02.29 NR	Eduardo Oliveira Moraes (BRA)	8:08.50	Santiago Corredor (COL)	8:09.51
1500 m freestyle	Ivo Cassini (ARG)	15:30.81	Pedro Guastelli Farias (BRA)	15:33.16	Martín Carrizo (ARG)	15:36.91
50 m backstroke	Anthony Rincón (COL)	25.90	Charles Hockin (PAR)	25.98	Pedro Motta (BRA)	26.00
100 m backstroke	Anthony Rincón (COL)	55.91	Agustín Hernández (ARG)	56.23	Omar Pinzón (COL)	56.47
200 m backstroke	Omar Pinzón (COL)	2:02.03	Tomas Peribonio (ECU)	2:02.87 NR	Juan Ignacio Méndez (ARG)	2:03.38
50 m breaststroke	Renato Prono (PAR)	27.60	Jorge Murillo (COL)	27.83	Gabriel Morelli (ARG)	28.37
100 m breaststroke	Jorge Murillo (COL)	1:00.53	Gabriel Morelli (ARG)	1:02.26	Renato Prono (PAR)	1:02.44
200 m breaststroke	Jorge Murillo (COL)	2:12.70	Gabriel Morelli (ARG)	2:14.01	Pedro Cristo (BRA)	2:19.49
50 m butterfly	Victor Baganha (BRA)	24.03	Roberto Strelkov (ARG)	24.07	Guido Buscaglia (ARG)	24.29
100 m butterfly	Victor Baganha (BRA)	53.40	Jorge Otaiza (VEN)	53.65	Bryan Chávez (VEN)	53.90
200 m butterfly	Gustavo Saldo (BRA)	1:58.76	Federico Ludueña (ARG)	2:01.15	Nicolás Deferrari (ARG)	2:01.60
200 m individual medley	Tomas Peribonio (ECU)	2:00.84	Omar Pinzón (COL)	2:03.77	Vinícius Assunção (BRA)	2:03.99
400 m individual medley	Tomas Peribonio (ECU)	4:19.92	Vinícius Assunção (BRA)	4:29.72	Pedro Cristo (BRA)	4:30.62
4 × 100 m freestyle relay	Brazil; Guilherme Caribé Santos (50.74); Victor Alcará (49.02); Victor Baganha (49.61); Lucas Peixoto (49.17)	3:18.54	Venezuela; Alberto Mestre Vivas (49.63); Jesús López (50.91); Bryan Chávez (50.05); Cristian Quintero (49.05)	3:19.64	Argentina; Joaquín González Piñero (51.45); Roberto Strelkov (49.87); Joaquín Renzi (51.60); Guido Buscaglia (49.47)	3:22.39
4 × 200 m freestyle relay	Brazil; Murilo Sartori (1:49.47); Pablo Silva Vieira (1:51.26); Gustavo Saldo (1:49.19); Lucas Peixoto (1:54.40)	7:24.32	Argentina; Joaquín González Piñero (1:51.11); Franco Melián (1:55.40); Martín Carrizo (1:54.32); Joaquín Renzi (1:53.20)	7:34.03	Chile; Jorge Depassier (1:55.69); Eduardo Cisternas (1:55.74); Mariano Lazzerini (1:56.02); Gabriel Araya (1:52.19)	7:39.64
4 × 100 m medley relay	Colombia; Anthony Rincón (56.10); Jorge Murillo (1:00.20); Esnaider Reales (53.72); Santiago Aguilera (51.10)	3:41.12	Argentina; Agustín Hernández (56.46); Gabriel Morelli (1:01.41); Nicolás Deferrari (54.48); Guido Buscaglia (49.30)	3:41.65	Brazil; Pedro Motta (56.88); Davi Martins Mourão (1:04.18); Victor Baganha (52.66); Lucas Peixoto (49.19)	3:42.91

=== Women's events ===
Event	Gold		Silver		Bronze	
50 m freestyle	Isabella Arcila (COL)	25.38	Jeserik Pinto (VEN)	25.52	Andrea Berrino (ARG)	25.74
100 m freestyle	Anicka Delgado (ECU)	55.97	Isabella Arcila (COL)	56.01	Andrea Berrino (ARG)	56.86
200 m freestyle	Rafaela Raurich (BRA)	2:01.83	Sofia Rondel (BRA)	2:02.12	Inés Marín (CHI)	2:03.77
400 m freestyle	Delfina Pignatiello (ARG)	4:15.00	Rafaela Raurich (BRA)	4:17.32	Lucía Gauna (ARG)	4:18.25
800 m freestyle	Delfina Pignatiello (ARG)	8:34.10	Kristel Kobrich (CHI)	8:34.11	Delfina Dini (ARG)	9:44.82
1500 m freestyle	Kristel Kobrich (CHI)	16:06.78 CR	Delfina Pignatiello (ARG)	16:25.68	Delfina Dini (ARG)	16:40.97
50 m backstroke	Isabella Arcila (COL)	28.77	Andrea Berrino (ARG)	29.12	Alexia Sotomayor (PER)	29.60
100 m backstroke	Isabella Arcila (COL)	1:02.08	Maria Luiza Pessanha (BRA)	1:02.71	McKenna DeBever (PER)	1:02.88
200 m backstroke	Andrea Berrino (ARG)	2:16.43	Maria Luiza Pessanha (BRA)	2:16.46	Alexia Assunção (BRA)	2:17.19
50 m breaststroke	Macarena Ceballos (ARG)	31.27 CR	Julia Sebastián (ARG)	31.55	Karina Vivas (COL)	31.91
100 m breaststroke	Julia Sebastián (ARG)	1:08.93	Macarena Ceballos (ARG)	1:09.49	Karina Vivas (COL)	1:10.22
200 m breaststroke	Julia Sebastián (ARG)	2:27.59	Gabrielle da Silva (BRA)	2:28.53	Macarena Ceballos (ARG)	2:31.18
50 m butterfly	Anicka Delgado (ECU)	26.66 NR	Jeserik Pinto (VEN)	26.94	Luanna de Oliveira (BRA)	27.36
100 m butterfly	Anicka Delgado (ECU)	1:00.27 NR	Macarena Ceballos (ARG)	1:00.49 NR	Luanna de Oliveira (BRA)	1:00.61
200 m butterfly	Rafaela Raurich (BRA)	2:14.09	Virginia Bardach (ARG)	2:14.58	Maria Luiza Pessanha (BRA)	2:15.51
200 m individual medley	McKenna DeBever (PER)	2:16.07	Fernanda Celidônio (BRA)	2:16.83	Virginia Bardach (ARG)	2:17.76
400 m individual medley	Virginia Bardach (ARG)	4:49.76	María Alborzen (ARG)	4:53.98	Fernanda Celidônio (BRA)	4:57.50
4 × 100 m freestyle relay	Argentina; María Ruggiero (58.36); Lucía Gauna (56.95); Macarena Ceballos (57.64); Andrea Berrino (57.07)	3:50.02	Colombia; Isabella Arcila (56.35); Karen Durango (57.86); María Álvarez (58.91); Daniela Gutiérrez (57.39)	3:50.51	Brazil; Rafaela Raurich (57.52); Júlia Góes (58.11); Fernanda Andrade (57.61); Sofia Rondel (57.39)	3:50.73
4 × 200 m freestyle relay	Brazil; Rafaela Raurich (2:01.24); Fernanda Andrade (2:07.09); Giulia Chicon (2:05.49); Sofia Rondel (2:01.53)	8:15.35	Argentina; Lucía Gauna; Virginia Bardach; Delfina Dini (2:06.57); Delfina Pignatiello (2:04.71)	8:20.71	Colombia; Karen Durango (2:06.04); Laura Melo (2:10.43); María Álvarez (2:04.72); Daniela Gutiérrez (2:06.76)	8:27.95
4 × 100 m medley relay	Argentina; Andrea Berrino (1:03.31); Julia Sebastián (1:08.95); Macarena Ceballos (1:01.32); Lucía Gauna (56.98)	4:10.56	Colombia; Isabella Arcila (1:01.92); Karina Vivas (1:10.29); Valentina Becerra (1:01.71); Daniela Gutiérrez (57.40)	4:11.31	Brazil; Maria Luiza Pessanha (1:03.13); Gabrielle da Silva (1:11.00); Luanna de Oliveira (1:00.42); Fernanda Andrade (57.89)	4:12.44

=== Mixed events ===
Games	Gold		Silver		Bronze	
4 × 100 m medley relay	Colombia; Isabella Arcila (1:01.98); Jorge Murillo (1:00.15); Esnaider Reales (53.71); Daniela Gutiérrez (57.24)	3:53.08	Argentina; Agustín Hernández (56.33); Julia Sebastián (1:07.75); Macarena Ceballos; Guido Buscaglia	3:53.84	Brazil; Maria Luiza Pessanha (1:02.88); Gabrielle da Silva (1:11.69); Victor Baganha (53.34); Lucas Peixoto (48.92)	3:56.83

== Medal standings ==
* Host nation (Argentina)

Rank	Nation	Gold	Silver	Bronze	Total
1	Brazil (BRA)	11	11	14	36
2	Colombia (COL)	11	5	5	21
3	Argentina (ARG)*	10	16	13	39
4	Ecuador (ECU)	5	1	0	6
5	Venezuela (VEN)	2	5	2	9
6	Chile (CHI)	1	1	2	4
7	Paraguay (PAR)	1	1	1	3
8	Peru (PER)	1	0	3	4
9	Uruguay (URU)	1	0	0	1
Totals (9 entries)		43	40	40	123

== Team ranking ==
Rank	Team	Points
1	Argentina	439
2	Brazil	419.33
3	Colombia	267
4	Chile	139
5	Venezuela	122.33
6	Ecuador	75.5
7	Paraguay	69
8	Peru	67.5
9	Uruguay	51.33
10	Bolivia	12
