= Beach volleyball at the 2022 South American Youth Games – Boys' tournament =

Beach volleyball – Boys' tournament at the 2022 South American Youth Games
- Beach volleyball pictogram
- Venue: Estadio Arena
- Location: Rosario, Argentina
- Dates: 28 April – 1 May 2022
- Competitors: 24 from 11 nations

Medalists
gold medal	Henrique Camboim; Pedro Sousa	Brazil
silver medal	Maximiliano Córdova; Martín Etcheberry	Chile
bronze medal	Ángel Palacios; Camilo Vargas	Paraguay

The boys' tournament competition of the beach volleyball events at the 2022 South American Youth Games took place from 28 April to 1 May 2022 at the Estadio Arena in the La Rural cluster. The defending South American Youth Games champions were Juan Amieva and Mauro Zelayeta, led by Sebastian Stratchan, from Argentina.

Brazilian pair Henrique Camboim and Pedro Sousa won the gold medal after defeating the Chilean pair Maximiliano Córdova and Martín Etcheberry in the final. Paraguayans Ángel Palacios and Camilo Vargas kept the bronze medal.

== Teams ==
Twelve teams entered to the event.

NOC	Team
Argentina	Facundo Doval / Marcos González
Argentina	Agustín Moyano / Ramiro Sancer
Bolivia	Eric Claros / Danilo Gascón
Brazil	Henrique Camboim / Pedro Sousa
Chile	Maximiliano Córdova / Martín Etcheberry
Colombia	Miguel Ángel Cardona / Julián Contreras
Ecuador	Bryan Cordero / Damián Recalde
Paraguay	Ángel Palacios / Camilo Vargas
Peru	Renato Parreno / Gabriel Rengifo
Suriname	Meson Anakaba / Jonovan Wijngaarde
Uruguay	Franco Delfino / Alejo Divenuto
Venezuela	Juan José Díaz / José Torrealba

== Groups composition ==
The groups were conformed as follows:

Group A
Pos	Team
A1	Moyano – Sancer (ARG)
A2	Delfino – Divenuto (URU)
A3	Díaz – Torrealba (VEN)

Group B
Pos	Team
B1	Camboim – Sousa (BRA)
B2	Parreno – Rengifo (PER)
B3	Cordero – Recalde (ECU)

Group C
Pos	Team
C1	Córdova – Etcheberry (CHI)
C2	Claros – Gascón (BOL)
C3	Anakaba – Wijngaarde (SUR)

Group D
Pos	Team
D1	Palacios – Vargas (PAR)
D2	Cardona – Contreras (COL)
D3	Doval – González (ARG)

== Results ==
All match times are in PET (UTC−5).

=== Preliminary round ===
==== Group A ====
Pos	Team	Pld	W	L	Pts	SW	SL	SR	SPW	SPL	SPR	Qualification
1	Díaz – Torrealba (VEN)	2	2	0	4	4	1	4.000	102	88	1.159	Quarterfinals
2	Moyano – Sancer (ARG)	2	1	1	3	3	2	1.500	94	93	1.011	Quarterfinals
3	Delfino – Divenuto (URU)	2	0	2	2	0	4	0.000	73	86	0.849	Placement 9th–12th

Source: Rosario 2022

28 April 2022; 10:00	Moyano – Sancer (Argentina)	1–2	(Venezuela) Díaz – Torrealba	Estadio Arena – Court 1
28 April 2022; 10:00	(25–23, 16–21, 10-15); Report			Estadio Arena – Court 1

28 April 2022; 13:20	Delfino – Divenuto (Uruguay)	0–2	(Venezuela) Díaz – Torrealba	Estadio Arena – Court 1
28 April 2022; 13:20	(17–21, 20–22); Report			Estadio Arena – Court 1

29 April 2022; 9:00	Moyano – Sancer (Argentina)	2–0	(Uruguay) Delfino – Divenuto	Estadio Arena – Court 1
29 April 2022; 9:00	(21–14, 22–20); Report			Estadio Arena – Court 1

==== Group B ====
Pos	Team	Pld	W	L	Pts	SW	SL	SR	SPW	SPL	SPR	Qualification
1	Camboim – Sousa (BRA)	2	2	0	4	4	0	MAX	84	44	1.909	Quarterfinals
2	Cordero – Recalde (ECU)	2	1	1	3	2	2	1.000	67	72	0.931	Quarterfinals
3	Parreno – Rengifo (PER)	2	0	2	2	0	4	0.000	49	84	0.583	Placement 9th–12th

Source: Rosario 2022

28 April 2022; 10:00	Camboim – Sousa (Brazil)	2–0	(Ecuador) Cordero – Recalde	Estadio Arena – Court 2
28 April 2022; 10:00	(21–9, 21–16); Report			Estadio Arena – Court 2

28 April 2022; 13:20	Parreno – Rengifo (Peru)	0–2	(Ecuador) Cordero – Recalde	Estadio Arena – Court 2
28 April 2022; 13:20	(14–21, 16–21); Report			Estadio Arena – Court 2

29 April 2022; 9:50	Camboim – Sousa (Brazil)	2–0	(Peru) Parreno – Rengifo	Estadio Arena – Court 2
29 April 2022; 9:50	(21–9, 21–10); Report			Estadio Arena – Court 2

==== Group C ====
Pos	Team	Pld	W	L	Pts	SW	SL	SR	SPW	SPL	SPR	Qualification
1	Córdova – Etcheberry (CHI)	2	2	0	4	4	0	MAX	84	46	1.826	Quarterfinals
2	Claros – Gascón (BOL)	2	1	1	3	2	2	1.000	70	73	0.959	Quarterfinals
3	Anakaba – Wijngaarde (SUR)	2	0	2	2	0	4	0.000	49	84	0.583	Placement 9th–12th

Source: Rosario 2022

28 April 2022; 10:50	Córdova – Etcheberry (Chile)	2–0	(Suriname) Anakaba – Wijngaarde	Estadio Arena – Court 2
28 April 2022; 10:50	(21–11, 21–7); Report			Estadio Arena – Court 2

28 April 2022; 14:10	Claros – Gascón (Bolivia)	2–0	(Suriname) Anakaba – Wijngaarde	Estadio Arena – Court 2
28 April 2022; 14:10	(21–14, 21–17); Report			Estadio Arena – Court 2

29 April 2022; 9:50	Córdova – Etcheberry (Chile)	2–0	(Bolivia) Claros – Gascón	Estadio Arena – Court 1
29 April 2022; 9:50	(21–9, 21–19); Report			Estadio Arena – Court 1

==== Group D ====
Pos	Team	Pld	W	L	Pts	SW	SL	SR	SPW	SPL	SPR	Qualification
1	Doval – González (ARG)	2	2	0	4	4	0	MAX	53	84	0.631	Quarterfinals
2	Palacios – Vargas (PAR)	2	1	1	3	2	2	1.000	74	76	0.974	Quarterfinals
3	Cardona – Contreras (COL)	2	0	2	2	0	4	0.000	106	109	0.972	Placement 9th–12th

Source: Rosario 2022

28 April 2022; 10:50	Palacios – Vargas (Paraguay)	0–2	(Argentina) Doval – González	Estadio Arena – Court 1
28 April 2022; 10:50	(12–21, 20–22); Report			Estadio Arena – Court 1

28 April 2022; 14:10	Cardona – Contreras (Colombia)	0–2	(Argentina) Doval – González	Estadio Arena – Court 1
28 April 2022; 14:10	(10–21, 10–21); Report			Estadio Arena – Court 1

29 April 2022; 9:00	Palacios – Vargas (Paraguay)	2–0	(Colombia) Cardona – Contreras	Estadio Arena – Court 2
29 April 2022; 9:00	(21–18, 21–15); Report			Estadio Arena – Court 2

=== Placement 9th–12th ===
9th–10th semi-finals
Delfino – Divenuto (URU)	2
Cardona – Contreras (COL)	0
Parreno – Rengifo (PER)	2
Anakaba – Wijngaarde (SUR)	0

9th–10th place match
Delfino – Divenuto (URU)	2
Parreno – Rengifo (PER)	0
11th–12th place match
Cardona – Contreras (COL)	2
Anakaba – Wijngaarde (SUR)	0

==== 9th–12th semi-finals ====
29 April 2022; 12:20	Delfino – Divenuto (Uruguay)	2–0	(Colombia) Cardona – Contreras	Estadio Arena – Court 1
29 April 2022; 12:20	(22–20, 21–14); Report			Estadio Arena – Court 1

29 April 2022; 12:20	Parreno – Rengifo (Peru)	2–0	(Suriname) Anakaba – Wijngaarde	Estadio Arena – Court 2
29 April 2022; 12:20	(21–8, 21–6); Report			Estadio Arena – Court 2

==== 11th–12th place match ====
30 April 2022; 13:00	Cardona – Contreras (Colombia)	2–0	(Suriname) Anakaba – Wijngaarde	Estadio Arena – Court 1
30 April 2022; 13:00	(21–15, 21–18); Report			Estadio Arena – Court 1

==== 9th–10th place match ====
30 April 2022; 13:00	Delfino – Divenuto (Uruguay)	2–0	(Peru) Parreno – Rengifo	Estadio Arena – Court 2
30 April 2022; 13:00	(21–15, 21–13); Report			Estadio Arena – Court 2

=== Placement 1st–8th ===
The quarter-finals matchups were:

- Match M: 1st Group A vs. 2nd Group D
- Match N: 1st Group D vs. 2nd Group A
- Match O: 1st Group B vs. 2nd Group C
- Match P: 1st Group C vs. 2nd Group B

The semi-finals matchups were:

- Match Q: Winner Match N vs. Winner Match O
- Match R: Winner Match M vs. Winner Match P

5th–6th place match
Díaz – Torrealba (VEN)	2
Moyano – Sancer (ARG)	0
7th–8th place match
Cordero – Recalde (ECU)	2
Claros – Gascón (BOL)	0

5th–8th semi-finals
Díaz – Torrealba (VEN)	2
Cordero – Recalde (ECU)	1
Moyano – Sancer (ARG)	2
Claros – Gascón (BOL)	0

Quarterfinals
Díaz – Torrealba (VEN)	0
Palacios – Vargas (PAR)	2
Córdova – Etcheberry (CHI)	2
Cordero – Recalde (ECU)	0
Doval – González (ARG)	2
Moyano – Sancer (ARG)	0
Camboim – Sousa (BRA)	2
Claros – Gascón (BOL)	0

Semifinals
Palacios – Vargas (PAR)	0
Córdova – Etcheberry (CHI)	2
Doval – González (ARG)	0
Camboim – Sousa (BRA)	2

Gold medal match
Córdova – Etcheberry (CHI)	0
Camboim – Sousa (BRA)	2
Bronze medal match
Palacios – Vargas (PAR)	2
Doval – González (ARG)	1

==== Quarter-finals ====
29 April 2022; 13:10	Díaz – Torrealba (Venezuela)	0–2	(Paraguay) Palacios – Vargas	Estadio Arena – Court 2
29 April 2022; 13:10	(20–22, 19–21); Report			Estadio Arena – Court 2

29 April 2022; 13:10	Doval – González (Argentina)	2–0	(Argentina) Moyano – Sancer	Estadio Arena – Court 1
29 April 2022; 13:10	(21–19, 21–16); Report			Estadio Arena – Court 1

29 April 2022; 14:00	Córdova – Etcheberry (Chile)	2–0	(Ecuador) Cordero – Recalde	Estadio Arena – Court 1
29 April 2022; 14:00	(21–10, 21–9); Report			Estadio Arena – Court 1

29 April 2022; 14:00	Camboim – Sousa (Brazil)	2–0	(Bolivia) Claros – Gascón	Estadio Arena – Court 2
29 April 2022; 14:00	(21–17, 21–9); Report			Estadio Arena – Court 2

==== 5th–8th semi-finals ====
30 April 2022; 14:00	Díaz – Torrealba (Venezuela)	2–1	(Ecuador) Cordero – Recalde	Estadio Arena – Court 2
30 April 2022; 14:00	(21–19, 18–21, 15-13); Report			Estadio Arena – Court 2

30 April 2022; 14:00	Moyano – Sancer (Argentina)	2–0	(Bolivia) Claros – Gascón	Estadio Arena – Court 1
30 April 2022; 14:00	(21–16, 21–12); Report			Estadio Arena – Court 1

==== Semi-finals ====
1 May 2022; 11:00	Palacios – Vargas (Paraguay)	0–2	(Chile) Córdova – Etcheberry	Estadio Arena – Court 2
1 May 2022; 11:00	(16–21, 14–21); Report			Estadio Arena – Court 2

1 May 2022; 11:00	Doval – González (Argentina)	0–2	(Brazil) Camboim – Sousa	Estadio Arena – Court 1
1 May 2022; 11:00	(22–24, 15–21); Report			Estadio Arena – Court 1

==== 7th–8th place match ====
1 May 2022; 12:00	Cordero – Recalde (Ecuador)	2–0	(Bolivia) Claros – Gascón	Estadio Arena – Court 2
1 May 2022; 12:00	(21–14, 21–19); Report			Estadio Arena – Court 2

==== 5th–6th place match ====
1 May 2022; 12:00	Díaz – Torrealba (Venezuela)	2–0	(Argentina) Moyano – Sancer	Estadio Arena – Court 1
1 May 2022; 12:00	(23–21, 23–21); Report			Estadio Arena – Court 1

==== Bronze medal match ====
1 May 2022; 13:00	Palacios – Vargas (Paraguay)	2–1	(Argentina) Doval – González	Estadio Arena – Court 1
1 May 2022; 13:00	(22–20, 15–21, 15-9); Report			Estadio Arena – Court 1

==== Gold medal match ====
1 May 2022; 14:00	Córdova – Etcheberry (Chile)	0–2	(Brazil) Camboim – Sousa	Estadio Arena – Court 1
1 May 2022; 14:00	(16–21, 13–21); Report			Estadio Arena – Court 1

== Final ranking ==
Rank	Team
1st place, gold medalist(s)	Henrique Camboim – Pedro Sousa (BRA)
2nd place, silver medalist(s)	Maximiliano Córdova – Martín Etcheberry (CHI)
3rd place, bronze medalist(s)	Ángel Palacios – Camilo Vargas (PAR)
4	Facundo Doval – Marcos González (ARG)
5	Juan José Díaz – José Torrealba (VEN)
6	Agustín Moyano – Ramiro Sancer (ARG)
7	Bryan Cordero – Damián Recalde (ECU)
8	Eric Claros – Danilo Gascón (BOL)
9	Franco Delfino – Alejo Divenuto (URU)
10	Renato Parreno – Gabriel Rengifo (PER)
11	Miguel Ángel Cardona – Julián Contreras (COL)
12	Meson Anakaba – Jonovan Wijngaarde (SUR)
