= Swimming at the 2022 Bolivarian Games =

Swimming competitions at the 2022 Bolivarian Games

- Swimming pictogram
- Venue: Aquatics Complex; Ciénaga de Zapatosa
- Dates: 2–5 July 2022
- Competitors: 143 from 10 nations

Champions
- Colombia (15 gold, 12 silver, 12 bronze)

Swimming competitions at the 2022 Bolivarian Games in Valledupar, Colombia were held from 2 to 5 July 2022 at the Aquatics Complex in the Popular University of Cesar cluster, with the marathons swimming being held at Ciénaga de Zapatosa in Chimichagua, a sub-venue outside Valledupar.

Forty medal events were scheduled to be contested including the open-water marathons; 34 swimming events equally divided among men and women, two mixed swimming events and 4 open-water marathons (2 per gender). A total of 143 athletes competed in the events, including 21 from the open-water marathons. The events were open competitions without age restrictions.

Venezuela were the swimming competitions defending champions having won them in the previous edition in Santa Marta 2017. Colombia obtained 15 of the 40 gold medals at stake to win the swimming competitions.

== Participating nations ==
A total of 10 nations (all 7 ODEBO nations and 3 invited) registered athletes for the swimming competitions. Each nation was able to enter a maximum of 28 swimmers (14 per gender) for the pool events and up to 4 swimmers (2 per gender) for the open-water events.

- Bolivia (8 athletes)
- Chile (12)
- Colombia (28)
- Ecuador (14)
- El Salvador (5)
- Dominican Republic (8)
- Panama (8)
- Paraguay (15)
- Peru (26)
- Venezuela (19)

== Events ==
The following events were scheduled to be contested (all pool events are long course, and distances are in metres unless stated):

- Freestyle: 50, 100, 200, 400, 800, and 1,500;
- Backstroke: 100 and 200;
- Breaststroke: 100 and 200;
- Butterfly: 100 and 200;
- Individual medley: 200 and 400;
- Relays: 4×100 free (including mixed), 4×200 free, 4×100 medley (including mixed)
- Marathon: 10 kilometres

== Venues ==
The swimming competitions were held in two venues. Pool events took place at the Popular University of Cesar's Aquatics Complex in Valledupar, while open-water events were held at Ciénaga de Zapatosa in Chimichagua, a municipality located 147 km south Valledupar. Ciénaga de Zapatosa also served as venue for the rowing, canoeing and triathlon competitions.

== Medal summary ==
=== Medal table ===
* Host nation (Host nation)

| Rank | Nation | Gold | Silver | Bronze | Total |
|---|---|---|---|---|---|
| 1 | Colombia | 15 | 12 | 12 | 39 |
| 2 | Venezuela | 14 | 10 | 5 | 29 |
| 3 | Peru | 5 | 4 | 5 | 14 |
| 4 | Ecuador | 3 | 3 | 3 | 9 |
| 5 | Dominican Republic | 2 | 2 | 4 | 8 |
| 6 | Paraguay | 1 | 5 | 4 | 10 |
| 7 | Panama | 0 | 3 | 1 | 4 |
| 8 | Chile | 0 | 1 | 5 | 6 |
| Totals (8 entries) | | 40 | 40 | 39 | 119 |

Source: Bolivarianos Valledupar 2022 – Swimming medals, Open water swimming medals

=== Medalists ===
==== Men's events ====
| Event | Gold | | Silver | | Bronze | |
|---|---|---|---|---|---|---|
| 50 m freestyle | Alberto Mestre; Venezuela | 21.94 | Jesús Daniel López; Venezuela | 22.82 SB | Mariano Lazzerini; Chile | 23.03 |
| 100 m freestyle | Alberto Mestre; Venezuela | 49.32 GR | Benjamín Hockin; Paraguay | 50.24 PB, SB | Alfonso Mestre; Venezuela | 50.93 |
| 200 m freestyle | Alfonso Mestre; Venezuela | 1:47.74 PB, GR | Rafael Davila; Venezuela | 1:49.62 PB | Joaquín Vargas; Peru | 1:50.59 PB, SB |
| 400 m freestyle | Alfonso Mestre; Venezuela | 3:49.08 | Juan Morales; Colombia | 3:51.38 | Rafael Dávila; Venezuela | 3:53.26 |
| 800 m freestyle | Alfonso Mestre; Venezuela | 7:57.74 | Rafael Davila; Venezuela | 8:04.24 SB | Juan Morales; Colombia | 8:08.61 |
| 1500 m freestyle | Alfonso Mestre; Venezuela | 15:22.33 PB, GR | Rafael Davila; Venezuela | 15:31.74 PB | Juan Morales; Colombia | 15:38.73 |
| 100 m backstroke | Omar Pinzón; Colombia | 55.87 | Charles Hockin; Paraguay | 56.45 PB, SB | David Céspedes; Colombia | 57.54 |
| 200 m backstroke | Omar Pinzón; Colombia | 2:01.42 PB, GR | David Céspedes; Colombia | 2:03.07 PB | Matías López; Paraguay | 2:04.30 PB |
| 100 m breaststroke | Jorge Murillo; Colombia | 1:01.02 PB | Mariano Lazzerini; Chile | 1:01.38 PB, SB | Josué Domínguez; Dominican Republic | 1:01.81 SB |
| 200 m breaststroke | Jorge Murillo; Colombia | 2:13.45 PB | Tyler Christianson; Panama | 2:14.56 | Mariano Lazzerini; Chile | 2:15.02 PB |
| 100 m butterfly | Jorge Otaiza; Venezuela | 53.13 GR | Esnaider Reales; Colombia | 53.82 | Benjamín Hockin; Paraguay | 54.18 PB, SB |
| 200 m butterfly | Esnaider Reales; Colombia | 2:02.12 PB | Yugo Parodi; Ecuador | 2:02.33 PB | Santiago Corredor; Colombia | 2:03.78 |
| 200 m individual medley | Omar Pinzón; Colombia | 2:02.77 PB | Matheo Mateos; Paraguay | 2:04.11 PB | Tyler Christianson; Panama | 2:04.31 |
| 400 m individual medley | Matheo Mateos; Paraguay | 4:26.94 PB | Santiago Corredor; Colombia | 4:29.09 PB | Matías López; Paraguay | 4:30.93 PB |
| 4 × 100 m freestyle relay | Venezuela (VEN); Bryan Chávez; Alberto Mestre; Alfonso Mestre; Emil Pérez | 3:21.72 GR | Colombia (COL); Santiago Aguilera; Santiago Arteaga; Santiago Corredor; Juan Morales | 3:24.63 | Chile (CHI); Eduardo Cisternas; Mariano Lazzerini; Manuel Osorio; Benjamín Schnapp | 3:25.45 |
| 4 × 200 m freestyle relay | Venezuela (VEN); Bryan Chávez; Rafael Dávila; Alfonso Mestre; Emil Pérez | 7:23.76 GR | Colombia (COL); Santiago Arteaga; Sebastián Camacho; Santiago Corredor; Juan Morales | 7:29.97 | Chile (CHI); Gabriel Araya; Eduardo Cisternas; Mariano Lazzerini; Matías Pinto | 7:37.10 |
| 4 × 100 m medley relay | Colombia (COL); Juan Morales; Jorge Murillo; Omar Pinzón; Esnaider Reales | 3:40.89 GR | Venezuela (VEN); Jesús Daniel López; Alberto Mestre; Jorge Otaiza; Luis Ángel Ramírez | 3:45.02 | Paraguay (PAR); Benjamín Hockin; Charles Hockin; Matheo Mateos; Renato Prono | 3:45.05 |
| 5 km open water | Esteban Enderica; Ecuador | 55:55.42 | Diego Vera; Venezuela | 57:11.94 | David Farinango; Ecuador | 57:12.35 |
| 10 km open water | Esteban Enderica; Ecuador | 1:56:27.56 | David Farinango; Ecuador | 1:56:39.81 | Diego Vera; Venezuela | 1:57:35.49 |
PB Personal best / SB Season best / GR Games record

==== Women's events ====
| Event | Gold | | Silver | | Bronze | |
|---|---|---|---|---|---|---|
| 50 m freestyle | Sirena Rowe; Colombia | 25.43 SB | Anicka Delgado; Ecuador | 25.62 | Krystal Lara; Dominican Republic | 25.89 SB |
| 100 m freestyle | Anicka Delgado; Ecuador | 56.31 | Krystal Lara; Dominican Republic | 56.39 PB | Rafaela Fernandini; Peru | 57.85 |
| 200 m freestyle | Krystal Lara; Dominican Republic | 2:01.21 GR | Maria Victoria Yegres; Venezuela | 2:02.41 | Karen Durango; Colombia | 2:04.13 |
| 400 m freestyle | Maria Victoria Yegres; Venezuela | 4:19.18 | Karen Durango; Colombia | 4:20.49 PB | Michelle Jativa; Ecuador | 4:22.31 PB, SB |
| 800 m freestyle | Maria Victoria Yegres; Venezuela | 08:50.60 | Karen Durango; Colombia | 08:58.31 PB | Sophia Ribeiro; Peru | 09:06.20 |
| 1500 m freestyle | María Victoria Yegres; Venezuela | 16:58.69 PB | Karen Durango; Colombia | 17:24.78 | Sophia Ribeiro; Peru | 17:29.03 |
| 100 m backstroke | McKenna DeBever; Peru | 1:03.73 | Krystal Lara; Dominican Republic | 1:03.83 | Jimena Leguizamón; Colombia | 1:04.29 |
| 200 m backstroke | Jimena Leguizamón; Colombia | 2:16.76 GR | Alexia Sotomayor; Peru | 2:17.91 | Elizabeth Jiménez; Dominican Republic | 2:20.82 |
| 100 m breaststroke | Stefanía Gómez; Colombia | 1:09.57 GR, NR | Emily Marie Santos; Panama | 1:11.08 | Karina Vivas; Colombia | 1:11.10 |
| 200 m breaststroke | Mercedes Toledo; Venezuela | 2:34.50 PB, SB | Emily Marie Santos; Panama | 2:34.82 PB | Karina Vivas; Colombia | 2:38.01 |
| 100 m butterfly | Krystal Lara; Dominican Republic | 59.97 GR | Luana Alonso; Paraguay | 1:00.65 | Valentina Becerra; Colombia | 1:00.92 |
| 200 m butterfly | Karen Durango; Colombia | 2:14.20 PB | María Fe Muñoz; Peru | 2:16.41 PB, SB | Samantha Baños; Colombia | 2:17.16 PB |
| 200 m individual medley | McKenna DeBever; Peru | 2:18.47 | Laura Melo; Colombia | 2:21.03 | Jimena Leguizamón; Colombia | 2:21.78 |
| 400 m individual medley | María Fe Muñoz; Peru | 4:57.35 PB, SB | Samantha Baños; Colombia | 5:04.87 | Mariana Cote; Venezuela | 5:05.30 PB |
| 4 × 100 m freestyle relay | Colombia (COL); Karen Durango; Stefanía Gómez; Daniela Gutiérrez; Bárbara Muñoz | 3:51.05 | Peru (PER); Micaela Bernales; Jessica Cattaneo; McKenna DeBever; Rafaela Fernandini | 3:53.02 | Venezuela (VEN); Lismar Lyon; Maria Victoria Yegres; Mercedes Toledo; Nicole Gutiérrez | 3:57.57 |
| 4 × 200 m freestyle relay | Colombia (COL); Karen Durango; Stefanía Gómez; Manuela Libreros; Bárbara Muñoz | 8:28.40 | Peru (PER); Micaela Bernales; Jessica Cattaneo; McKenna DeBever; Sophia Ribeiro | 8:29.75 | Not awarded (only two teams) | — |
| 4 × 100 m medley relay | Colombia (COL); Valentina Becerra; Karen Durango; Stefanía Gómez; Jimena Leguizamón | 4:13.70 | Venezuela (VEN); Nicole Gutiérrez; Lismar Lyon; Mercedes Toledo; Maria Victoria Yegres | 4:19.94 | Peru (PER); Adriana Buendia; Rafaela Fernandini; María Fe Muñoz; Alexia Sotomayor | 4:23.21 |
| 5 km open water | María Bramont-Arias; Peru | 1:01:37.32 | Valentina Pérez; Venezuela | 1:02:19.04 | Danna Martínez; Ecuador | 1:02:57.80 |
| 10 km open water | María Bramont-Arias; Peru | 2:05:05.95 | Valentina Pérez; Venezuela | 2:05:08.16 | Mahina Valdivia; Chile | 2:08:07.38 |
PB Personal best / SB Season best / GR Games record

==== Mixed events ====
| Event | Gold | | Silver | | Bronze | |
|---|---|---|---|---|---|---|
| 4 × 100 m freestyle relay | Venezuela (VEN); Alberto Mestre; Alfonso Mestre; Mercedes Toledo; Maria Victoria Yegres | 3:34.21 | Colombia (COL); Santiago Aguilera; Karen Durango; Stefanía Gómez; Juan Morales | 3:35.51 | Peru (PER); McKenna DeBever; Rafaela Fernandini; Joaquín Vargas; Miguel Zavaleta | 3:38.32 |
| 4 × 100 m medley relay | Colombia (COL); Valentina Becerra; Karen Durango; Jorge Murillo; Omar Pinzón | 3:54.95 | Paraguay (PAR); Luana Alonso; Charles Hockin; Sofia López; Renato Prono | 3:58.89 | Dominican Republic (DOM); Josué Domínguez; Denzel González; Elizabeth Jiménez; Krystal Lara | 3:59.11 |
