= Esnaider Reales =

Colombian swimmer (born 1996)

Personal information
- Full name: Esnaider Rey Reales Arrieta
- Nationality: Colombia
- Born: 28 April 1996 (age 30)
- Height: 1.77 m (5 ft 10 in)
- Weight: 78 kg (172 lb)

Sport
- Sport: Swimming
- Strokes: Butterfly
Medal record
Representing Colombia
Men's swimming
Event	1st	2nd	3rd
CAC Games	0	3	1
South American Games	1	2	2
South American Championships	2	1	7
Bolivarian Games	2	5	0
Total	5	11	10
Central American and Caribbean Games
Silver medal – second place	2018 Barranquilla	4×100 m medley
Silver medal – second place	2018 Barranquilla	4×100 m mixed freestyle
Silver medal – second place	2023 San Salvador	4×100 m mixed medley
Bronze medal – third place	2018 Barranquilla	100 m butterfly
South American Games
Gold medal – first place	2018 Cochabamba	4×100 m medley
Silver medal – second place	2018 Cochabamba	100 m butterfly
Silver medal – second place	2022 Asunción	4×100 m medley
Bronze medal – third place	2018 Cochabamba	4×100 m freestyle
Bronze medal – third place	2018 Cochabamba	4×200 m freestyle
South American Championships
Gold medal – first place	2021 Buenos Aires	4×100 m medley
Gold medal – first place	2021 Buenos Aires	4×100 m mixed medley
Silver medal – second place	2014 Mar del Plata	200 m butterfly
Bronze medal – third place	2014 Mar del Plata	100 m butterfly
Bronze medal – third place	2014 Mar del Plata	4×100 m medley
Bronze medal – third place	2016 Asunción	4×200 m freestyle
Bronze medal – third place	2018 Trujillo	4×100 m freestyle
Bronze medal – third place	2018 Trujillo	4×200 m freestyle
Bronze medal – third place	2018 Trujillo	4×100 m medley
Bronze medal – third place	2018 Trujillo	4×100 m mixed freestyle
Bolivarian Games
Gold medal – first place	2022 Valledupar	200 m butterfly
Gold medal – first place	2022 Valledupar	4×100 m medley
Silver medal – second place	2017 Santa Marta	100 m butterfly
Silver medal – second place	2017 Santa Marta	4×100 m freestyle
Silver medal – second place	2017 Santa Marta	4×100 m medley
Silver medal – second place	2017 Santa Marta	4×100 m mixed freestyle
Silver medal – second place	2022 Valledupar	100 m butterfly

Esnaider Rey Reales Arrieta (Note: In this Spanish name, the first or paternal surname is Reales and the second or maternal family name is Arrieta.) (born 28 April 1996) is a Colombian swimmer. He competed in the men's 50 metre butterfly event at the 2018 FINA World Swimming Championships (25 m), in Hangzhou, China.

Reales also competed at the 2015, 2019 and 2023 Pan American Games, the 2022 Bolivarian Games, the 2018 and the 2022 South American Games, and the 2018 and 2023 Central American and Caribbean Games.
