= 2013 South American Youth Games =

I South American Youth Games
- Host city: Lima
- Country: Peru
- Nations: 14
- Debuting countries: 14
- Athletes: 1200
- Events: 18 sports
- Opening: September 20
- Closing: September 29
- Opened by: Ollanta Humala; President of Peru
- Athlete's Oath: Pamela Moya
- Judge's Oath: Joel Ugarte
- Torch lighter: Carlos Zegarra
- Main venue: Estadio Miguel Grau

The 2013 South American Youth Games, also known as the I South American Youth Games, was a multi-sport event celebrated in Lima, Peru from September 20 to 29, 2013. Approximately 1,200 athletes from 14 National Olympic Committees (NOCs) competed in 95 events from 19 sports and disciplines, making the first event in the history of the games.

== Participating teams ==
14 nations of the Organización Deportiva Suramericana (ODESUR) competed in these Youth Games.

- Argentina
- Aruba
- Bolivia
- Brazil
- Chile
- Colombia
- Ecuador
- Guyana
- Panama
- Paraguay
- Peru (host)
- Suriname
- Uruguay
- Venezuela

== Sports ==
18 sports were contested in these Games.

- Aquatics
  - Diving
  - Swimming
- Athletics
- Badminton
- Boxing
- Canoeing
- Cycling
  - BMX racing
  - Mountain biking
  - Road cycling
- Fencing
- Artistic gymnastics
- Judo
- Rowing
- Sailing
- Table tennis
- Taekwondo
- Tennis
- Triathlon
- Beach volleyball (2)
- Weightlifting
- Wrestling

== Medals ==
Key

* Host nation (Peru)

Rank	Nation	Gold	Silver	Bronze	Total
1	Brazil (BRA)	72	38	32	142
2	Colombia (COL)	30	20	20	70
3	Venezuela (VEN)	17	28	20	65
4	Ecuador (ECU)	16	22	17	55
5	Argentina (ARG)	12	18	34	64
6	Peru (PER)*	9	20	36	65
7	Chile (CHL)	8	12	21	41
8	Panama (PAN)	5	3	8	16
9	Uruguay (URU)	3	5	5	13
10	Paraguay (PAR)	3	3	4	10
11	Bolivia (BOL)	2	2	1	5
12	Aruba (ARU)	1	1	5	7
13	Guyana (GUY)	0	1	6	7
14	Suriname (SUR)	0	1	3	4
Totals (14 entries)		178	174	212	564
