= Anicka Delgado =

Ecuadorian swimmer (born 2002)

Personal information
- Full name: Anicka Rain Marie Delgado Kotek
- Nationality: American, Ecuadorian
- Born: 13 June 2002 (age 24) Shakopee, Minnesota, U.S.
- Height: 170 cm (5 ft 7 in)
- Relatives: Felipe Delgado, father Roberto Delgado, uncle

Sport
- Country: Ecuador
- Sport: Swimming
- Strokes: Freestyle; Individual Medley
- Club: Gators Swim Club
- College team: University Southern California
- Coach: Felipe Delgado; Richard Blanc (Santa Margarita High); Lea Maurer (U. Southern Cal.)
Medal record
Women's swimming
Representing Ecuador
Swimming at the Bolivarian Games
Gold medal – first place	2022 Valledupar	100 m freestyle
Silver medal – second place	2022 Valledupar	50 m freestyle
Silver medal – second place	2017 Santa Marta	200 m individual medley
Bronze medal – third place	2017 Santa Marta	50 m freestyle
Bronze medal – third place	2017 Santa Marta	4 x 100 m freestyle relay

Anicka Rain Marie Delgado Kotek (born 13 June 2002) is an Ecuadorian-American swimmer who competed for the University of Southern California, and represented Ecuador in sprint butterfly and freestyle events at the 2020 Tokyo Olympics and the 2024 Paris Olympics. Born in the United States, she represented Ecuador internationally and held an Ecuadorian record in the 200-meter Long Course freestyle event in the 2022–23 season.

== Early life and family ==
An American citizen by birth, and a third-generation American on her father's side, Delgado was born into a family with three siblings on 13 June 2002, in Shakopee, Minnesota to mother Megan and father Felipe Delgado. From a highly accomplished family of Ecuadorian swimmers, her sister Valentina swam with her at the Gators Swim Club, and her siblings Francesca and Luca took early swimming at the Evolution Swim Academy. Her father Felipe, who founded Evolution Swim Academy in 2005, grew up in Mission Viejo, California, represented Ecuador in freestyle and butterfly at the 2000 Sydney and 1996 Atlanta Olympics, and served as one of Anicka's coaches, providing helpful guidance throughout her career. Her Uncle, Roberto Delgado, another native of California, represented Ecuador in the 1996 Atlanta and 2000 Sydney Olympics in freestyle and butterfly swimming events. Anicka is also related to Jorge Delgado Jr., who swam for Ecuador in the 1972 Munich and 1976 Montreal Olympics in freestyle, butterfly and individual medley events, and worked with the Ecuadorian Olympic committee, holding the office of President.

=== 2018 Youth Olympics ===
As a youngster at the 2018 Youth Olympics in Buenos Aires, Argentina, she was introduced to international competition early, competing against 36 participants from 35 countries. She competed in the 50, 100, and 200-meter freestyle events, and the 50, and 100-meter butterfly. Well trained and conditioned at an early age, her best time was a 26.80 in the 50-meter butterfly which placed her fifth overall in the finals.

=== High School ===
Growing up in Laguna Hills, California, she attended Laguna Hills High School and Santa Margarita Catholic High School where she was coached by Richard and Ron Blanc. During her High School years, Delgado was a California Interscholastic Federation (CIF) State Champion. She competed at the 2015 CIF California State Championships, where she won a title in the 50-yard freestyle with a time of 22.54 and placed second in the 100-yard butterfly with a time of 53.49. She was a Division 1 California CIF Southern Section Champion twice, in the 50-yard freestyle with a time of 22.55 and in the 100-yard butterfly with a time of 53.33.

== University of Southern California ==
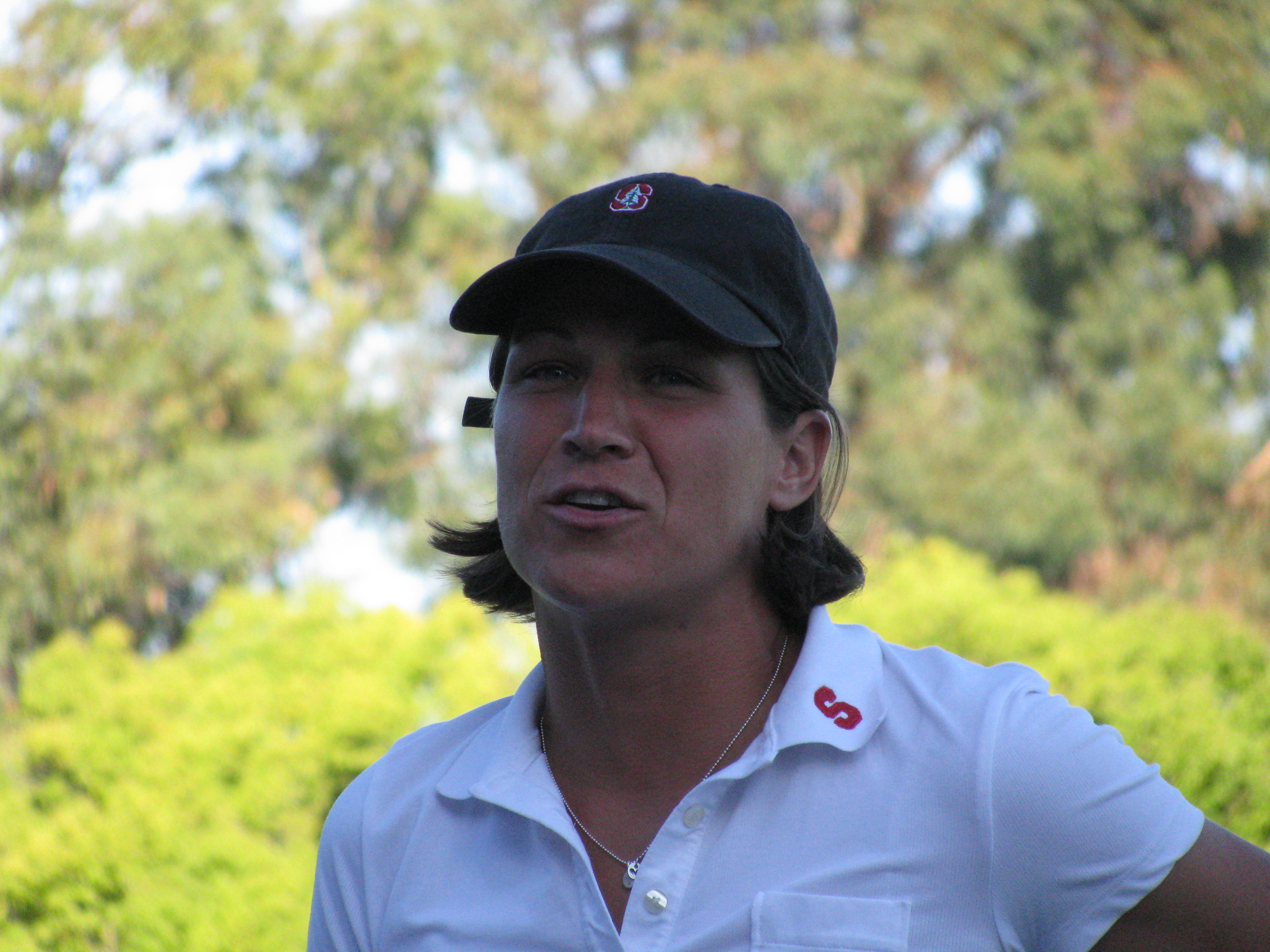
USC Coach Lea Maurer

Delgado competed for the University of Southern California from 2020 to 2024 where she swam in her early years for Coach Catherine Vogt Kase and later as an upperclassman for Lea Maurer, a 1992 Olympic gold medalist and former Stanford Coach. In her Freshman year, Delgado participated in only three regular season meets with USC, taking time to train for the Olympics and compete internationally, yet still won a Pacific Coast-12 championship.

In her Junior year, in the 2022–23 season, Anicka received Honorable Mention All American honors from the College Swimming Coaches Association of America in the 200 and 400 yard medley relays and the 400 yard free relay.

As a Senior in the 2023-2024 swim year, she helped lead USC to their only undefeated season with a 9–0 record, the most seasonal wins in the school's history. Annika was a College Swimming Coaches Association of America (CSCAA) All American in four events at USC in her Senior year in the 2023–4 season, and was a Pacific Coast-12 Champion in four events. She competed most successfully in the 50, 200 and 400 freestyle events, as well as the 50 and 200 medley.

As a college Junior in the 2022–2023 season, she set a 200-meter National Long Course freestyle record for Ecuador of 2:02.54.

=== 2019 World Aquatics ===
In international competition, she competed in the women's 50 metre butterfly and women's 100 metre freestyle events at the 2019 World Aquatics Championships in Gwangju, South Korea. In both events she did not advance to compete in the semi-finals.

== 2020 Tokyo Olympics ==
She represented Ecuador at the 2020 Tokyo Olympics in the 50-meter freestyle where she placed 25th with a time of 25.36, and in the 100-meter freestyle where she placed 31st with a time of 55.56.

== 2024 Paris Olympics ==
Anicka represented Ecuador in the 2024 Paris Summer Olympics, as the only female competitor. She competed in the 50-meter freestyle where she placed 26th overall with a time of 25.43. Sarah Sjostrom of Sweden took the gold, Meg Harris of Australia took the silver, and Zhang Yufei of China took the bronze medal.
