= Josué Domínguez =

Dominican Republic swimmer (born 1996)

Personal information
- Full name: Josué Domínguez Ramos
- Nationality: Dominican Republic
- Born: 20 November 1996 (age 29) Santiago de los Caballeros, Dominican Republic

Sport
- Sport: Swimming
- College team: BYU Cougars
- Club: Asociacion de Natacion de Santiago
Medal record
Men's swimming
Representing the Dominican Republic
Bolivarian Games
Bronze medal – third place	2022 Valledupar	100 m breaststroke
Bronze medal – third place	2022 Valledupar	4×100 m mixed medley

Josué Domínguez Ramos (born 20 November 1996) is a swimmer from the Dominican Republic. He competed in the 2020 Summer Olympics.
