= Tomás Peribonio =

Ecuadorian swimmer (born 1996)

Personal information
- Full name: Tomás Alberto Peribonio Ávila
- Nationality: American, Ecuadorian
- Born: Tomas Alberto Peribonio; 16 January 1996 (age 30) Miami, Florida, U.S.
- Height: 1.85 m (6 ft 1 in)
- Weight: 83 kg (183 lb)

Sport
- Country: Ecuador
- Sport: Swimming
- Event: 200, 400 IM
- Strokes: Individual Medley
- Club: Lansmore Lasers (2008); Swim Atlanta Johns Creek (Member)
- College team: University of South Carolina (2018)
- Coach: McGee Moody (U. South Carolina)
Medal record
Men's swimming
Representing Ecuador
South American Championships
Gold medal – first place	2021 Buenos Aires	200 m medley
Gold medal – first place	2021 Buenos Aires	400 m medley
Silver medal – second place	2021 Buenos Aires	200 m backstroke

Tomás Alberto Peribonio Ávila (born 16 January 1996) is a competitive swimmer, who competed for the University of South Carolina. Born in the United States, he represented Ecuador at the 2020 Tokyo and 2024 Paris Olympics in the 200 and 400 Individual Medley events, though he did not advance to the finals. He has also competed for Ecuador in international competition, including the 2015 Pan American Games and both the 2015 and 2017 World Aquatic Championships. He won two Gold and a silver medal at the 2021 South American Championships in the 200 and 400 Individual Medley and the 200 backstroke respectively.

== Early life ==
Tomas Peribonio Ávila was born 16 January 1996 in Miami, Florida, one of four siblings to Martha, and Thomas J. Peribonio, and held American citizenship as a result of his place of birth. After a move, he attended North Gwinnett High School, in Suwanee, Georgia, graduating around 2014. In his early swimming career, he competed for the Lansmore Lasers Swim Club in the Gwinnett Swim Club in greater Atlanta in the summer of 2008, where he was already competing and placing in short freestyle and individual medley events. In club swimming, he competed and trained with Swim Atlanta Johns Creek in Suwanee, where he was a club member. A multi-stroke competitor during his High School swimming career, in the 100 freestyle he held a Georgia 6A State Championship, and established a total of sixteen swimming records for North Gwinnett High.

== International highlights ==
He made his international debut at the 2015 Pan American Games, where he was a finalist. He has competed at the 2015 World Aquatics Championships (Kazan, Russia), the 2016 FINA World Swimming Championships in (Windsor, Ontario, Canada) the 2017 World Aquatics Championships (Budapest, Hungary), the 2018 FINA World Swimming Championships (Hangzhou, China) and the 2019 World Aquatics Championships (Gwangju, South Korea). He currently holds 9 national records in Olympic events, including the 200 Meters Individual Medley and 400 Meters Individual Medley.

== University of South Carolina ==
Peribonio attended and swam for the University of South Carolina from 2014 to 2018, where he was a recipient of All-American honors in each of his four years of swimming eligibility, and made Academic Honor Roll in at least three years. At South Carolina, he swam for McGee Moody, a long tenured and accomplished coach who led the U. South Carolina swim team from 2007 to 2021, had a 53.7 winning percentage, and coached three Olympians in addition to Peribonio. The South Carolina swim team did not win the conference championship during Peribonio's tenure, as the Southeastern Conference has repeatedly proven to be a particularly competitive conference, though Peribonio's team placed in the top 25 at the NCAA championships around four years during his swimming tenure. A competent student at South Carolina, Peribonio majored in International Business. He set various meet and conference records in his signature events, the 200 and 400 Individual Medley, and in the 500, 1000, and 1650 freestyle events. In his Junior year from 2016 to 2017, Peribonio was undefeated in the 200 Individual Medley, one of his signature events. In his Senior year, Peribonio set a school record for South Carolina in the Championships for the Southeast Conference with a time of 1:44.0 for the 200 Individual Medley.

As evidenced by the 2020 Roster for the professional team Cali Condors shown below, Peribonio appears to have competed for the Cali Condors, a professional team based in San Francisco and a member of the International Swimming League, where he was coached by Jonty Skinner in the 2020 season.

== Olympics ==
He competed at the 2020 Tokyo Olympics for Ecuador in the 200 meter individual medley placing 36th overall and in the 400-meter individual medley placing 24th. His time in the 200-meter IM was 2:00.62 and he did not make the semi-finals. In the 400-meter IM, his time was 4:18.73, and he did not advance to a final round.

At the 2024 Paris Olympics, again competing for Ecuador, Peribonio competed in the 200-meter Individual Medley, finishing 19th with a time of 2:03.40, and did not advance to the finals.
