= Krystal Lara =

Dominican competitive swimmer (born 1998)

Personal information
- Full name: Krystal Denise Lara
- National team: Dominican Republic
- Born: March 18, 1998 (age 28) Staten Island, New York
- Education: Stuyvesant High School
- Height: 5ft 5in (165 cm)

Sport
- Sport: Swimming
- Event(s): Butterfly and Backstroke
- College team: Northwestern University
- Club: Asphalt Green Unified Aquatics (Eastside)
Medal record
Women's swimming
Representing Dominican Republic
Central American and Caribbean Games
Silver medal – second place	2018 Barranquilla	200 m backstroke
Bronze medal – third place	2018 Barranquilla	100 m backstroke
Bolivarian Games
Gold medal – first place	2022 Valledupar	200 m freestyle
Gold medal – first place	2022 Valledupar	100 m butterfly
Silver medal – second place	2022 Valledupar	100 m freestyle
Silver medal – second place	2022 Valledupar	100 m backstroke
Bronze medal – third place	2022 Valledupar	50 m freestyle
Bronze medal – third place	2022 Valledupar	4×100 m mixed medley

Krystal Denise Lara (born March 18, 1998) is a Dominican-American competitive swimmer who specializes in the 100 butterfly, 100 backstroke, and 200 backstroke. Her international debut was at the 2018 Central American and Caribbean Games, where she won a bronze and silver medal in the 100 and 200 backstroke, respectively.

== Early life ==
Lara was born in Staten Island, New York, and is the daughter of Frederick and Alexandra Lara. She has double nationality through her father who is Dominican. Her mother was born and raised in Colombia. Lara attended Stuyvesant High School in New York City and was a member of the swim club Asphalt Green Unified Aquatics. She holds multiple records in her high school swim team, the Stuyvesant Penguins, where she was known as "Krystal the Pistol." She was a student-athlete and NCAA Division I All-American at Northwestern University on an athletic scholarship and graduated in 2020 with a major in sociology and minor in business institutions.

== Career ==
Lara's first national stage was at the 2016 U.S. Olympic Trials, for which she qualified in the 100-meter backstroke. She placed 86th with a time of 1.03.59.

At her first 2018 Campeonatos Nacionales FEDONA, Dominican Republic Swimming Nationals, Lara broke five national records which include the 100 freestyle, 50 backstroke, 100 backstroke, 200 backstroke, and 100 butterfly. She re-broke these records at the 2018 Central American and Caribbean Games in Barranquilla, Colombia. Lara won bronze in the 100 backstroke, clocking a 1.01.39, just 0.05 shy from silver and 0.09 from gold. In the 200 backstroke she won silver with a time of 2.13.82, also 0.12 away from gold. Lara missed the podium in the 100 butterfly, placing fourth with a time of 1.00.48.

Lara broke a 28-year medal drought when she won the bronze medal in the 100 backstroke. She also became the first Dominican swimmer in history to win a silver medal in these games. She was named to the Dominican Olympic team for the postponed 2020 Olympics in Tokyo.

At the VII Dominican Republic International Swim Open, Lara broke a 34-year-old record in the 200 meter butterfly with a time of 2:15.83. She currently holds 13 Dominican national records.
