= Andrés Vasconcellos =

Ecuadorian swimmer

Personal information
- Full name: André Vasconcellos Mathieu
- Born: February 23, 1974 (age 52)

Sport
- Sport: Swimming

Andrés Vasconcellos Mathieu (born February 23, 1974) is a retired male freestyle and butterfly swimmer from Ecuador. He competed at the 1996 Summer Olympics for his native country.
