= Javier Santos =

Ecuadorian swimmer

Personal information
- Born: 21 March 1972 (age 54)

Sport
- Sport: Swimming

Javier Santos (born 21 March 1972) is an Ecuadorian swimmer. He competed in the men's 4 × 100 metre freestyle relay and men's 4 × 200 metre freestyle relay events at the 1996 Summer Olympics.
