= David Farinango =

Ecuadorian swimmer (born 2000)

Personal information
- Nationality: Ecuador
- Born: 20 October 2000 (age 25) Machala, Ecuador

Sport
- Sport: Swimming
- Event: Marathon swimming
Medal record
Representing Ecuador
South American Games
Silver medal – second place	2026 Santa Fe	10 km open water
Bolivarian Games
Silver medal – second place	2022 Valledupar	10 km open water
Bronze medal – third place	2022 Valledupar	5 km open water

David Farinango (born 20 October 2000) is an Ecuadorian marathon swimmer. He competed in the 2020 Summer Olympics and the 2024 Paris Olympics.
