= Julio Santos =

Ecuadorian swimmer

Personal information
- Full name: Julio Fernando Santos Masías
- Born: November 21, 1976 (age 49) Portoviejo, Colombia

Sport
- Sport: Swimming

Julio Fernando Santos Masías (born November 21, 1976) is a retired male freestyle swimmer from Ecuador. He competed in three consecutive Summer Olympics for his native South American country, starting in 1996. He was born in Portoviejo, Manabí.
