= Roberto Delgado (swimmer) =

Ecuadorian swimmer

Personal information
- Full name: Roberto Delgado Martillo
- National team: Ecuador
- Born: April 3, 1975 (age 51) Mission Viejo, California, U.S.
- Height: 1.78 m (5 ft 10 in)
- Weight: 80 kg (176 lb)

Sport
- Sport: Swimming
- Strokes: Freestyle, butterfly
- College team: Arizona State University (U.S.)
- Coach: Mike Chasson (U.S.)

Roberto Delgado Martillo (born April 3, 1975) is an American-Ecuadorian former swimmer who specialized in freestyle and butterfly events. A two-time Olympian (1996 and 2000), he holds numerous Ecuadorian records in both 100 and 200 m butterfly, and retains his dual resident status to compete internationally for his parents' homeland. While studying in the United States, Delgado has been listed as an all-time Top 10 performer in the 200 m butterfly for the Arizona State Sun Devils.

== Career ==
=== Early years ===
Delgado was born in Mission Viejo, California, United States to Ecuadorian parents, giving him a dual residential status. Coming from an athletic pedigree, he grew up most of his life in an aquatic field. His older brothers David and Eddie swam for the Mission Viejo High School team, while his cousin Jorge Delgado, Jr. competed in the 200 m butterfly (2:04.60) at the 1972 Summer Olympics in Munich, finishing behind Americans Mark Spitz, Gary Hall, Sr., and Robin Backhaus. His other sibling Felipe Delgado was primarily a water polo player in high school, before he officially became an elite sprint freestyle swimmer. Delgado and his brother Felipe shared a sibling tandem in the sport, when they both competed together for Ecuador at two Olympic games.

Delgado started his sporting career at age five. He and his siblings were encouraged by their mother to take swimming lessons because of his grandfather's tragic drowning. Being natural on the water in his early childhood, Delgado began competing in numerous age group meets across Mission Viejo and nearby areas. Delgado attended Mission Viejo High School, where he swam for the Mission Viejo Nadadores. Coming to the sport more reluctantly, he did not get serious about swimming until reaching his junior season.

Delgado accepted a partial athletic scholarship to attend the Arizona State University in Tempe, Arizona, where he played for the Arizona State Sun Devils swimming and diving team under head coach Mike Chasson. Serving as the school's team captain, he posted a sixth-fastest time of 1:48.74 in the 200-yard butterfly at the 1997 Pacific-10 Conference Championships. In the spring of 1998, he graduated from the University with a bachelor's degree in marketing.

=== International career ===
Delgado made his first Ecuadorian team, alongside his brother Felipe, at the 1996 Summer Olympics in Atlanta. He failed to reach the top 16 final in the 100 m butterfly, finishing forty-fourth with a time of 56.29. A member of the Ecuadorian squad, he placed fifteenth in the 4 × 100 m freestyle relay (3:27.77), and sixteenth in the 4 × 200 m freestyle relay (7:54.37).

On May 24, 1999, Delgado's swimming career had been overshadowed by a doping suspicion. He received a temporary suspension or a one-month ban from FINA after testing positive for the banned stimulants pseudophedrine and cathine at the Short Course World Championships in Hong Kong.

At the 2000 Summer Olympics inSydney, Delgado decided to drop all freestyle relays, and experiment instead with a butterfly double. He achieved FINA B-standards of 56.36 (100 m butterfly) and 2:04.53 (200 m butterfly) from the Pan American Games in Winnipeg, Manitoba, Canada. In his first event, 200 m butterfly, Delgado placed forty-third on the morning prelims. Swimming in heat one, he picked up a third seed by almost five seconds behind Chinese Taipei's Tseng Cheng-hua, outside his entry time of 2:08.18. Three days later, in the 100 m butterfly, Delgado challenged seven other swimmers in heat two, including Guam's 28-year-old Daniel O'Keeffe, and Bosnia's three-time Olympian Janko Gojković. He rocketed to a fifth-place finish and forty-sixth overall in a time of 56.07, but could not hold off a challenge from O'Keeffe, who touched the wall ahead by a small fraction of a second.
