= 2022 South American Youth Games =

Sports event in Rosario, Argentina

- Nations: 15
- Events: 26 sports
- Opening: 28 April 2022
- Closing: 8 May 2022
- Opened by: Governor Omar Perotti

The 2022 South American Youth Games (Spanish:Juegos Suramericanos de la Juventud), officially the III South American Youth Games, was an international multi-sport event held in Rosario, Argentina, from April 28 to May 8. It was the first time for the event to be held in Argentina.

The games were originally scheduled to be held from 13 to 25 April 2021, but had to be postponed until 2022 due to the COVID-19 pandemic.

== Participating teams ==
All 15 nations of the Organización Deportiva Suramericana (ODESUR) are expected to compete in these Youth Games.

- Argentina (host)
- Aruba
- Bolivia
- Brazil
- Chile
- Colombia
- Curaçao
- Ecuador
- Guyana
- Panama
- Paraguay
- Peru
- Suriname
- Uruguay
- Venezuela

== Sports ==
The sports program, which included 26 sports, was revealed by ODESUR on 30 March 2021.

- 3x3 basketball (3)
- Archery (6)
- Athletics (36)
- Badminton (5)
- Beach handball (2)
- Beach volleyball (2)
- Boxing (9)
- Climbing (2)
- Cycling (3)
- Fencing (6)
- Futsal (1)
- Gymnastics (14)
- Field hockey (2)
- Judo (8)
- Karate (6)
- Roller sports
  - Artistic roller skating (4)
  - Inline speed skating (8)
- Rugby sevens (2)
- Skateboarding (2)
- Swimming (36)
- Table tennis (3)
- Taekwondo (10)
- Tennis (5)
- Triathlon (3)
- Weightlifting (12)
- Wrestling (15)

== Calendar ==
The complete sports schedule was unveiled on 19 March 2022. The schedule of some events was amended after the definitive program by sport was presented.

| OC | Opening ceremony | ● | Event competitions | 1 | Event finals | CC | Closing ceremony |

| April/May | | 27 Wed | 28 Thu | 29 Fri | 30 Sat | 1 Sun | 2 Mon | 3 Tue | 4 Wed | 5 Thu | 6 Fri | 7 Sat | 8 Sun | Medal Events |
|---|---|---|---|---|---|---|---|---|---|---|---|---|---|---|
| Ceremonies (opening / closing) | | | OC | | | | | | | | | | CC | —N/a |
| 3x3 basketball | | | | ● | ● | 3 | | | | | | | | 3 |
| Archery | | | ● | 2 | ● | 4 | | | | | | | | 6 |
| Athletics | | | | | | | | | | 8 | 9 | 8 | 11 | 36 |
| Badminton | | | | | | | | | | ● | ● | ● | 5 | 5 |
| Beach handball | | | | | | | | | | ● | ● | ● | 2 | 2 |
| Beach volleyball | | | ● | ● | 1 | 1 | | | | | | | | 2 |
| Boxing | | | | | | | | | | ● | ● | 4 | 5 | 9 |
| Climbing | | | | | ● | 2 | | | | | | | | 2 |
| Cycling | | | | | | | | | | | 1 | | 2 | 3 |
| Fencing | | | | | | | | | | | 2 | 2 | 2 | 6 |
| Futsal | | | | | | | | | ● | ● | ● | ● | 1 | 1 |
| Artistic gymnastics | | | | 2 | 5 | 7 | | | | | | | | 14 |
| Field hockey | | | | | | | | | | ● | ● | 1 | 1 | 2 |
| Judo | | | | | | | | 4 | 4 | | | | | 8 |
| Karate | | | | | | | 2 | 2 | 2 | | | | | 6 |
| Roller sports | Artistic skating | | | ● | 4 | | | | | | | | | 4 |
| Roller sports | Speed skating | | | | | | | | | | 4 | 4 | | 8 |
| Rugby sevens | | | | ● | ● | 2 | | | | | | | | 2 |
| Skateboarding | | | | | | | | | | ● | ● | 2 | | 2 |
| Swimming | | | 10 | 10 | 9 | 7 | | | | | | | | 36 |
| Table tennis | | | ● | 2 | ● | 1 | | | | | | | | 3 |
| Taekwondo | | | 4 | 3 | 3 | | | | | | | | | 10 |
| Tennis | | ● | ● | ● | 2 | 3 | | | | | | | | 5 |
| Triathlon | | | | | | | | | | 2 | | 1 | | 3 |
| Weightlifting | | | | | | | | | | | 4 | 5 | 3 | 12 |
| Wrestling | Freestyle | | | 2 | 8 | | | | | | | | | 10 |
| Wrestling | Greco-Roman | | | 5 | | | | | | | | | | 5 |
| Total events | | | 14 | 26 | 32 | 30 | 2 | 6 | 6 | 10 | 20 | 27 | 32 | 205 |
| Cumulative total | | | 14 | 40 | 72 | 102 | 104 | 110 | 116 | 126 | 146 | 173 | 205 | N/A |
| April/May | | 27 Wed | 28 Thu | 29 Fri | 30 Sat | 1 Sun | 2 Mon | 3 Tue | 4 Wed | 5 Thu | 6 Fri | 7 Sat | 8 Sun | Medal Events |

== Medal table ==
Brazil led the medal table with a total of 147 medals with Colombia and hosts Argentina in the second and third place respectively. Only Aruba and Guyana did not win medals during the games.

* Host nation (Argentina)

| Rank | Nation | Gold | Silver | Bronze | Total |
|---|---|---|---|---|---|
| 1 | Brazil (BRA) | 64 | 40 | 43 | 147 |
| 2 | Colombia (COL) | 35 | 32 | 26 | 93 |
| 3 | Argentina (ARG)* | 31 | 28 | 54 | 113 |
| 4 | Venezuela (VEN) | 26 | 19 | 34 | 79 |
| 5 | Chile (CHI) | 15 | 22 | 23 | 60 |
| 6 | Ecuador (ECU) | 12 | 28 | 34 | 74 |
| 7 | Peru (PER) | 11 | 18 | 16 | 45 |
| 8 | Paraguay (PAR) | 5 | 4 | 5 | 14 |
| 9 | Uruguay (URU) | 3 | 5 | 10 | 18 |
| 10 | Panama (PAN) | 2 | 4 | 2 | 8 |
| 11 | Bolivia (BOL) | 1 | 4 | 6 | 11 |
| 12 | Curaçao (CUW) | 0 | 1 | 0 | 1 |
| 13 | Suriname (SUR) | 0 | 0 | 1 | 1 |
| Totals (13 entries) | | 205 | 205 | 254 | 664 |

Source: Rosario 2022

== Medalists ==
=== Archery ===
| Event | Gold | Silver | Bronze |
|---|---|---|---|
| Boys' individual recurve | Daniel Jimenez; Colombia | Emanuel Gravano; Brazil | Agustin Contreras; Chile |
| Girls' individual recurve | Isabelle Trindade; Brazil | Alexandra Zavala; Peru | Maria Paula Perez; Ecuador |
| Mixed team recurve | Colombia; Daniel Jimenez; Ana Sofia Villamil | Brazil; Emanuel Gravano; Isabelle Trindade | Chile; Matilde Baeza; Agustin Contreras |
| Boys' individual compound | Agustín Infante; Chile | Gabriel Nogueira; Brazil | Sebastian Avila; Venezuela |
| Girls' individual compound | Blanca Rodrigo; Ecuador | Bernardita Biava; Chile | Guillermina Gonzalez; Argentina |
| Mixed team compound | Chile; Bernardita Biava; Agustín Infante | Colombia; Julian Gomez; Isabella Sepulveda | Ecuador; Josepth Garcia; Blanca Rodrigo |

=== Athletics ===
Boys

| Event | Gold | Silver | Bronze |
|---|---|---|---|
| 100 m | Tomas Mondino; Argentina | Aron Earl; Peru | Adrian Nicolari; Uruguay |
| 200 m | Tomas Mondino; Argentina | Benjamin Aravena; Chile | Adrian Nicolari; Uruguay |
| 400 m | Vinicius Moura; Brazil | Ignacio Cabrera; Argentina | Emanuel Guzman; Venezuela |
| 800 m | Gonzalo Gervasini; Uruguay | Klaus Scholz; Chile | Uriel Muñoz; Argentina |
| 1500 m | Gonzalo Gervasini; Uruguay | Luis Huaman; Peru | Luis Chavez; Peru |
| 3000 m | Jose Lorenzo Riba; Argentina | Luis Chavez; Peru | Alexander García; Colombia |
| 110 m hurdles | Paulo Ferreira; Brazil | Fabrizio Jara; Paraguay | Joe Caicedo; Ecuador |
| 400 m hurdles | Vinicius de Brito; Brazil | Roineld Lara; Venezuela | Ian Pata; Ecuador |
| 2000 m steeplechase | Hector Gomez; Venezuela | Edgar Huillca; Peru | Paul Torres; Colombia |
| 10 km walk | Julián Alfonso; Colombia | Emanuel Apaza; Peru | Emanuel Pereira; Brazil |
| High jump | Cristobal Sahurie; Chile | Ruthemsly Daal; Curaçao | Hector Añez; Venezuela |
| Pole vault | Ricardo Montes de Oca; Venezuela | Leonardo Olate; Chile | Pedro dos Santos; Brazil |
| Long jump | Roy Chila; Ecuador | Ricardo Montes de Oca; Venezuela | Davi Savio; Brazil |
| Shot put | Erick Caicedo; Ecuador | Cipriano Riquelme; Chile | Adrian Martins; Brazil |
| Discus throw | Alan Fell; Chile | Juan David Montaño; Colombia | Ronicleiton de Jesus; Brazil |
| Hammer throw | Cipriano Riquelme; Chile | Juan Sebastián Scarpetta; Colombia | Luis Felipe Gomes; Brazil |
| Javelin throw | Juan David Guevara; Colombia | Arthur Monteiro; Brazil | Jenaro Aldaz; Argentina |

Girls

| Event | Gold | Silver | Bronze |
|---|---|---|---|
| 100 m | Antonia Ramirez; Chile | Camila Rodriguez; Argentina | Génesis Cañola; Ecuador |
| 200 m | Vanessa Sena; Brazil | Julia Rocha; Brazil | Génesis Cañola; Ecuador |
| 400 m | Julia Rocha; Brazil | Ibeyis Romero; Venezuela | Paola Loboa; Colombia |
| 800 m | Raymari Albornoz; Venezuela | Juana Zuberbuhler; Argentina | Nazarena Filpo; Uruguay |
| 1500 m | Vanessa Alder; Ecuador | Juana Zuberbuhler; Argentina | Alison Guaman; Ecuador |
| 3000 m | Valeria Sangoquiza; Ecuador | Alison Guaman; Ecuador | Amparo Herrera; Chile |
| 100 m hurdles | Pamela Santana; Brazil | Natalia Campregher; Brazil | Catalina Rozas; Chile |
| 400 m hurdles | Amanda Miranda; Brazil | Renata Godoy; Argentina | Helen Bernard; Argentina |
| 2000 m steeplechase | Armenia Hernandez; Venezuela | Valeria Sangoquiza; Ecuador | Bianca Davi; Brazil |
| 5 km walk | Ruby Segura; Colombia | Karen Litardo; Ecuador | Jhoselyn Cuizara; Bolivia |
| High jump | Luisa Lummertz; Brazil | Silvina Gil; Uruguay | Joaquina Dura; Argentina |
| Pole vault | Carolina Scarponi; Argentina | Asunción Dreyfus; Chile | Sharik Fontecha; Venezuela |
| Long jump | Vanessa Sena; Brazil | Matilde Tejos; Chile | Victoria Zanolli; Argentina |
| Triple jump | Alicia de la Rosa; Colombia | Joaquina Dura; Argentina | Matilde Tejos; Chile |
| Shot put | Camila Flach; Brazil | Anelis Korniejczuk; Argentina | Luisanys Fuentes; Venezuela |
| Discus throw | Camila Flach; Brazil | Delfina Orona; Argentina | Silvana Lara; Ecuador |
| Hammer throw | Giuliana Baigorria; Argentina | Julia Gutierrez; Venezuela | Kimberly de Souza; Brazil |
| Javelin throw | Anelis Korniejczuk; Argentina | Nohelia Sanchez; Ecuador | Maira Rosas; Argentina |

Mixed

| Event | Gold | Silver | Bronze |
|---|---|---|---|
| 4 × 400 m relay | Brazil; Vinicius de Brito; Vinicius Moura; Julia Rocha; Luise Rosa | Ecuador; Xiomara Ibarra; Andrea Barzallo; Ian Pata; Erick Paredes | Uruguay; Martina Bonaudi; Nazarena Filpo; Adrian Nicolari; Gonzalo Gervasini |

=== Badminton ===
| Event | Gold | Silver | Bronze |
|---|---|---|---|
| Boys' singles | Adriano Viale; Peru | Sharum Durand; Peru | Klerton de Carvalho; Brazil |
| Boys' singles | Adriano Viale; Peru | Sharum Durand; Peru | Henry Huebla; Ecuador |
| Girls' singles | Juliana Viana; Brazil | Fernanda Munar; Peru | Iona Gualdi; Argentina |
| Girls' singles | Juliana Viana; Brazil | Fernanda Munar; Peru | Rafaela Munar; Peru |
| Boys' doubles | Brazil; Klerton de Carvalho; João Mendonça | Peru; Sharum Durand; Adriano Viale | Ecuador; Henry Huebla; Luis López |
| Boys' doubles | Brazil; Klerton de Carvalho; João Mendonça | Peru; Sharum Durand; Adriano Viale | Paraguay; Alejandro Avalos; Josias Haneman |
| Girls' doubles | Peru; Fernanda Munar; Rafaela Munar | Brazil; Maria da Cruz; Juliana Viana | Argentina; Iona Gualdi; Ailen Oliva |
| Girls' doubles | Peru; Fernanda Munar; Rafaela Munar | Brazil; Maria da Cruz; Juliana Viana | Chile; Rosa Quilodran; Valentina Vasquez |
| Mixed doubles | Peru; Rafaela Munar; Adriano Viale | Peru; Sharum Durand; Fernanda Munar | Suriname; Miracle Abdillah; Rivano Bisphan |
| Mixed doubles | Peru; Rafaela Munar; Adriano Viale | Peru; Sharum Durand; Fernanda Munar | Chile; Benjamin Bahamondez; Valentina Vasquez |

=== Boxing ===
| Event | Gold | Silver | Bronze |
|---|---|---|---|
| Boys' 52 kg | Richard Erazo; Ecuador | Miguel Ospino; Colombia | Rian Sousa; Brazil |
| Boys' 52 kg | Richard Erazo; Ecuador | Miguel Ospino; Colombia | Ronaldo Chacon; Venezuela |
| Boys' 57 kg | Yonaiker Curbelo; Venezuela | Keiner Morales; Colombia | Abel Romero; Argentina |
| Boys' 57 kg | Yonaiker Curbelo; Venezuela | Keiner Morales; Colombia | Sebastian Daza; Bolivia |
| Boys' 63 kg | Enrique Garcés; Ecuador | Leonardo Bermúdez; Colombia | Hebert Bandeira; Brazil |
| Boys' 63 kg | Enrique Garcés; Ecuador | Leonardo Bermúdez; Colombia | Argenis Marin; Venezuela |
| Boys' 69 kg | Juan Cedeño; Venezuela | Luciano Amaya; Argentina | Nery Canaviri; Bolivia |
| Boys' 69 kg | Juan Cedeño; Venezuela | Luciano Amaya; Argentina | Juan Diego Bandera; Colombia |
| Boys' 75 kg | Ricardo Candido; Brazil | Johnny Hurtado; Ecuador | Santiago Leiva; Argentina |
| Boys' 75 kg | Ricardo Candido; Brazil | Johnny Hurtado; Ecuador | Lucas Sosa; Paraguay |
| Girls' 51 kg | Evimir Guevara; Venezuela | Yerlin Quiñones; Colombia | Tatiana Daglio; Argentina |
| Girls' 51 kg | Evimir Guevara; Venezuela | Yerlin Quiñones; Colombia | Victoria de Lima; Brazil |
| Girls' 57 kg | Milagros Quiquinte; Argentina | Xiomara Santamaria; Panama | Leidy Rivas; Colombia |
| Girls' 57 kg | Milagros Quiquinte; Argentina | Xiomara Santamaria; Panama | Lorena Barboza; Uruguay |
| Girls' 60 kg | Daniela Herrera; Argentina | Carolina Bracho; Venezuela | Rafaela Marques; Brazil |
| Girls' 60 kg | Daniela Herrera; Argentina | Carolina Bracho; Venezuela | Kerlly Tituaña; Ecuador |
| Girls' 69 kg | Nazareth Franco; Venezuela | Kelly Delgado; Ecuador | Cintia Burgos; Argentina |
| Girls' 69 kg | Nazareth Franco; Venezuela | Kelly Delgado; Ecuador | Genesis Madera; Colombia |

=== Climbing ===
| Event | Gold | Silver | Bronze |
|---|---|---|---|
| Boys' bouldering | José Tomas Ledesma; Chile | Paolo Rivadeneira; Ecuador | Tomas Chicaiza; Ecuador |
| Girls' bouldering | Mariana Hanggi; Brazil | Zoe Garcia; Argentina | Emilia Davila; Ecuador |

=== Cycling ===
| Event | Gold | Silver | Bronze |
|---|---|---|---|
| Boys' criterium | Mateo Duque; Argentina | Jonathan Guatibonza; Colombia | Arlex Mendez; Venezuela |
| Girls' criterium | Eliana Tocha; Argentina | Julieta Benedetti; Argentina | Ana Julia Santos; Brazil |
| Mixed team time trial | Argentina; Julieta Benedetti; Fabrizio Crozzolo | Argentina; Mateo Duque; Eliana Tocha | Argentina; Alejo Betique; Abril Garzon |

=== Fencing ===
| Event | Gold | Silver | Bronze |
|---|---|---|---|
| Boys' épée | Isaac Dorati; Panama | Marco Rojas; Bolivia | Javier Carmona; Chile |
| Boys' épée | Isaac Dorati; Panama | Marco Rojas; Bolivia | Sergio Garces; Colombia |
| Boys' foil | Alessio Fukuda; Peru | Snayker Antonielli; Venezuela | Isaac Camayo; Colombia |
| Boys' foil | Alessio Fukuda; Peru | Snayker Antonielli; Venezuela | Pedro Aguinaga; Ecuador |
| Boys' sabre | Simón Duran; Venezuela | Esteban Mayer; Bolivia | Erico Chaves; Brazil |
| Boys' sabre | Simón Duran; Venezuela | Esteban Mayer; Bolivia | Alejandro Pinzón; Colombia |
| Girls' épée | Victoria Guerrero; Venezuela | Isabella González; Colombia | Maria Vitoria Paro; Brazil |
| Girls' épée | Victoria Guerrero; Venezuela | Isabella González; Colombia | Amparo Perez; Argentina |
| Girls' foil | Rafaela Santibañez; Chile | Stella Reis; Brazil | Sarah Vinueza; Ecuador |
| Girls' foil | Rafaela Santibañez; Chile | Stella Reis; Brazil | Andrea Delmoral; Venezuela |
| Girls' sabre | Ariana Prieto; Venezuela | Luciana Garcia; Paraguay | Paulina Guerscovich; Argentina |
| Girls' sabre | Ariana Prieto; Venezuela | Luciana Garcia; Paraguay | Rafaela Bonadona; Bolivia |

=== Futsal ===
| Event | Gold | Silver | Bronze |
|---|---|---|---|
| Boys | Brazil; Leonardo Andrade; Gabriel Berwanger; Joao Cabral; Thierry Candido; Pedro da Silva; Gustavo de Mello; Pedro de Oliveira; Joao dos Santos; Joao Koji; Caio Macedo; Renan Navas; Alex Valentim | Argentina; Rodrigo Alvarez; Tomas Becco; Tomas Balbiano; Matias Bonino; Bruno Galvan; Lucas Granda; Santino Oilhaborda; Joaquin Sampayo; Lucca Santiago; Gonzalo Starna; Sergio Valiente; Lautaro Yañez | Paraguay; Robert Gamarra; Carlos Gonzalez; Nicolas Llanes; Luciano Luraghi; Luciano Mareco; Juan Martinez; Abelardo Melgarejo; Marcio Ramirez; Tobias Velazquez; Fabricio Vera; Ibrahim Zarate; Erwin Zorrilla |

=== Judo ===
| Event | Gold | Silver | Bronze |
|---|---|---|---|
| Boys' 55 kg | Jerónimo Pino; Colombia | Marcus Pinto; Brazil | Galo Villavicencio; Argentina |
| Boys' 55 kg | Jerónimo Pino; Colombia | Marcus Pinto; Brazil | Yang Lama; Ecuador |
| Boys' 66 kg | Ernane Ferreira; Brazil | Luis Pacheco; Ecuador | Esteban Barrionuevo; Argentina |
| Boys' 66 kg | Ernane Ferreira; Brazil | Luis Pacheco; Ecuador | Fabricio Meyer; Chile |
| Boys' 81 kg | Matheus Guimarães; Brazil | José Gonzalez; Ecuador | Junta Galarreta; Peru |
| Boys' 81 kg | Matheus Guimarães; Brazil | José Gonzalez; Ecuador | Luis Pariche; Venezuela |
| Boys' 100 kg | Jesse Gonçalves; Brazil | Anthony Vargas; Ecuador | Francisco Gonzalez; Argentina |
| Boys' 100 kg | Jesse Gonçalves; Brazil | Anthony Vargas; Ecuador | Eduardo Franco; Venezuela |
| Girls' 44 kg | Manuela Crespo; Colombia | Natalia Odreman; Venezuela | Melanie Loor; Ecuador |
| Girls' 52 kg | Agatha Cassari; Brazil | Laura Vasquez; Ecuador | Valentina Alamo; Argentina |
| Girls' 52 kg | Agatha Cassari; Brazil | Laura Vasquez; Ecuador | Leomaris Ruiz; Venezuela |
| Girls' 63 kg | Bianca Bernardo; Brazil | Luciana Julca; Peru | Constanza Perez; Chile |
| Girls' 63 kg | Bianca Bernardo; Brazil | Luciana Julca; Peru | Ingrid Choco; Colombia |
| Girls' 78 kg | Mari da Silva; Brazil | Karen Agudelo; Colombia | Scarleth Arellano; Ecuador |
| Girls' 78 kg | Mari da Silva; Brazil | Karen Agudelo; Colombia | Hannelys Espina; Venezuela |

=== Karate ===
| Event | Gold | Silver | Bronze |
|---|---|---|---|
| Boys' 61 kg | Juan Pablo de Castro; Brazil | Hermes Moreno; Peru | Juan Ignacio Gallardo; Argentina |
| Boys' 61 kg | Juan Pablo de Castro; Brazil | Hermes Moreno; Peru | Nelson Meneses; Venezuela |
| Boys' 68 kg | Fernando Villegas; Peru | Patricio Montalvetti; Argentina | Massimo Zunini; Chile |
| Boys' 68 kg | Fernando Villegas; Peru | Patricio Montalvetti; Argentina | Jorge Astudillo; Ecuador |
| Boys' +68 kg | Joaquin Sanchez; Venezuela | Santiago Ospina; Colombia | Miguiel Gutierrez; Brazil |
| Boys' +68 kg | Joaquin Sanchez; Venezuela | Santiago Ospina; Colombia | Yael Ordoñez; Ecuador |
| Girls' 53 kg | Sol Sandoval; Bolivia | Leticia de Almeida; Brazil | Karen Apolo; Ecuador |
| Girls' 53 kg | Sol Sandoval; Bolivia | Leticia de Almeida; Brazil | Ana Vasquez; Venezuela |
| Girls' 59 kg | Nicole Gamboa; Venezuela | Jenifer Bolado; Argentina | Isabel Plata; Bolivia |
| Girls' 59 kg | Nicole Gamboa; Venezuela | Jenifer Bolado; Argentina | Sofia Gomez; Peru |
| Girls' +59 kg | Evelin Diaz; Argentina | Jahaira Manrique; Ecuador | Danae Guerra; Chile |
| Girls' +59 kg | Evelin Diaz; Argentina | Jahaira Manrique; Ecuador | Maria Maldonado; Peru |

=== Roller sports ===
Artistic roller skating

| Event | Gold | Silver | Bronze |
|---|---|---|---|
| Boys' dance | Kevin Medziukevicius; Brazil | Juan José Pino; Colombia | Abel Latallada; Chile |
| Boys' freestyle | Juan Segundo Rodriguez; Argentina | Martin Gasalla; Uruguay | Kevin Medziukevicius; Brazil |
| Girls' dance | Lia Camargo; Brazil | Delfina Veljanovich; Argentina | María Muñoz; Colombia |
| Girls' freestyle | Zoe Manggia; Argentina | Luiza D'Angelo; Brazil | Geraldine González; Colombia |

Inline speed skating

| Event | Gold | Silver | Bronze |
|---|---|---|---|
| Boys' 200 m | Jhon Tascon; Colombia | Nicolas Albornoz; Chile | Jose Carlos Rojas; Venezuela |
| Boys' 500 m | Jhon Tascon; Colombia | Nicolas Albornoz; Chile | Jeremy Ulcuango; Ecuador |
| Boys' 1000 m | Nicolás García; Ecuador | Sebastián Flórez; Colombia | Jeremy Ulcuango; Ecuador |
| Boys' 10 km points | Sebastián Flórez; Colombia | Nicolás García; Ecuador | Jokin Ziaurriz; Argentina |
| Girls' 200 m | Sofía Ruiz; Colombia | Nelly Fernandez; Venezuela | Catalina Lorca; Chile |
| Girls' 500 m | Sofía Ruiz; Colombia | Catalina Lorca; Chile | Nelly Fernandez; Venezuela |
| Girls' 1000 m | Catalina Lorca; Chile | María Vargas; Colombia | Nelly Fernandez; Venezuela |
| Girls' 10 km points | María Vargas; Colombia | Fernanda Moncada; Ecuador | Lucia Monje; Argentina |

=== Rugby sevens ===
| Event | Gold | Silver | Bronze |
|---|---|---|---|
| Boys | Argentina; Lucas Albanese; Tomas Di Biase; Gino Dicapua; Benjamin Elizalde; Maximiliano Fiscella; Benjamin Galan; Genaro Podesta; Franco Rossetto; Simon Salcedo; Faustino Sanchez; Valentin Soler; Rafael Santa Ana | Chile; Rafael Barriga; Lucas Berstein; Juan Sebastian Bianchi; Andrei Cherniavsky; Agustin Game; Lorenzo Gutierrez; Gabriel Martinez; Raimundo Maurel; Mauro Mazzino; Diego Pierart; Franco Scassi-Buffa; Iñaki Tuset | Uruguay; Icaro Amarillo; Federico Armas; Franco Bertini; Phillip Bowles; Juan Bautista Crisci; Martin Espiñeira; Jeronimo Ferres; Luca Giovannone; Alejo Gonzalez; Santiago Rigoli; Emanuel San Andrea; Juan Pablo Vernengo |
| Girls | Brazil; Raissa Andraus; Giovanna Barth; Claudia Batista; Ketlyn Cardoso; Mariana Das Neves; Lavinia Demari; Ariely Faria; Mariely Faria; Julia Leni Ferreira; Fernanda Goncalves; Allanis Morais; Amanda Teixeira | Argentina; Ariadna Aballay; Milagros Bernal; Lourdes Cabrera; Camila Contreras; Ana Constansa Entable; Zaira Gonzalez; Agustina Ibañez; Candela Juan; Luciana Kraus; Florencia Marin; Ana Paula Quintero; Mariel Velay | Colombia; Laura Alzate; Maria Camila Arteaga; Viviana Bruno; Carol Carmona; Ana Sofia Cespedes; Mariangel Charris; Madi Cordoba; Nikol Durango; Yessenia Hinestroza; Dagna Redondo; Karla Rivas; Sara Velez |

=== Skateboarding ===
| Event | Gold | Silver | Bronze |
|---|---|---|---|
| Boys' street | Shaiel Rodriguez; Peru | José Ardila; Colombia | Matheus dos Santos; Brazil |
| Girls' street | Virginia Cavalcante; Brazil | Ailin Arzua; Argentina | Julieta Gonzalez; Uruguay |

=== Swimming ===
Boys

| Event | Gold | Silver | Bronze |
|---|---|---|---|
| 50 m freestyle | Emil Pérez; Venezuela | Diego Aranda; Uruguay | Matias Santiso; Argentina |
| 100 m freestyle | Emil Pérez; Venezuela | Santiago Arteaga; Colombia | Matias Santiso; Argentina |
| 200 m freestyle | Eduardo Cisternas; Chile | Santiago Arteaga; Colombia | Guilherme de Oliveira; Brazil |
| 400 m freestyle | Stephan Steverink; Brazil | Eduardo Cisternas; Chile | Guilherme de Oliveira; Brazil |
| 1500 m freestyle | Stephan Steverink; Brazil | Eduardo Cisternas; Chile | Guilherme de Oliveira; Brazil |
| 50 m backstroke | Elias Ardiles; Chile | Pedro Buch; Brazil | Lucca Cruz; Brazil |
| 100 m backstroke | Lucca Cruz; Brazil | Elias Ardiles; Chile | Ulises Saravia; Argentina |
| 200 m backstroke | Lucca Cruz; Brazil | Elias Ardiles; Chile | Valentin Almada; Argentina |
| 50 m breaststroke | Dante Nicola; Argentina | Felipe Ribeiro; Brazil | Guilherme de Godoy; Brazil |
| 100 m breaststroke | Dante Nicola; Argentina | Felipe Ribeiro; Brazil | Guilherme de Godoy; Brazil |
| 200 m breaststroke | Felipe Ribeiro; Brazil | Stephan Steverink; Brazil | Dante Nicola; Argentina |
| 50 m butterfly | Pedro Buch; Brazil | Emil Pérez; Venezuela | Felipe Baffico; Chile |
| 100 m butterfly | Pedro Buch; Brazil | Emil Pérez; Venezuela | Diego Balbi; Peru |
| 200 m butterfly | Lucas Tudoras; Brazil | Heitor Napolitano; Brazil | Ariel Troya; Ecuador |
| 200 m individual medley | Stephan Steverink; Brazil | Esteban Nuñez; Bolivia | Guilherme Gustavo; Brazil |
| 4 × 100 m freestyle relay | Brazil; Stephan Steverink; Pedro Buch; Guilherme de Oliveira; Lucas Tudoras | Chile; Eduardo Cisternas; Felipe Baffico; Vicente Villanueva; Elias Ardiles | Venezuela; Reymer Alvarez; Adrian Vegas; Sebastian Teran; Emil Pérez |
| 4 × 100 m medley relay | Brazil; Pedro Buch; Lucca Cruz; Felipe Ribeiro; Lucas Tudoras | Chile; Elias Ardiles; Felipe Baffico; Eduardo Cisternas; Vicente Villanueva | Argentina; Valentin Almada; Dante Nicola; Matias Santiso; Ulises Saravia |

Girls

| Event | Gold | Silver | Bronze |
|---|---|---|---|
| 50 m freestyle | Stephanie Balduccini; Brazil | Deyse Goncalves; Brazil | Stefanía Gómez; Colombia |
| 100 m freestyle | Giovana Reis; Brazil | Stephanie Balduccini; Brazil | Chiara Medun; Argentina |
| 200 m freestyle | Stephanie Balduccini; Brazil | Giovana Reis; Brazil | Maria Yegres; Venezuela |
| 400 m freestyle | Stephanie Balduccini; Brazil | Maria Yegres; Venezuela | Giovana Reis; Brazil |
| 800 m freestyle | Luiza Comini; Brazil | Maria Yegres; Venezuela | Danna Martinez; Ecuador |
| 50 m backstroke | Alexia Sotomayor; Peru | Jimena Leguizamón; Colombia | Juana Ortiz; Argentina |
| 100 m backstroke | Jimena Leguizamón; Colombia | Alexia Sotomayor; Peru | Stephanie Balduccini; Brazil |
| 200 m backstroke | Jimena Leguizamón; Colombia | Alexia Sotomayor; Peru | Juana Ortiz; Argentina |
| 50 m breaststroke | Stefanía Gómez; Colombia | Emily Santos; Panama | Manuela Ballan; Brazil |
| 100 m breaststroke | Stefanía Gómez; Colombia | Emily Santos; Panama | Manuela Ballan; Brazil |
| 200 m breaststroke | Emily Santos; Panama | Micaela Sierra; Uruguay | Iara Villalba; Argentina |
| 50 m butterfly | Beatriz Bezerra; Brazil | Luana Alonso; Paraguay | Stefanía Gómez; Colombia |
| 100 m butterfly | Luana Alonso; Paraguay | Beatriz Bezerra; Brazil | Stephanie Balduccini; Brazil |
| 200 m butterfly | Maria Yegres; Venezuela | Luana Alonso; Paraguay | Luiza Comini; Brazil |
| 200 m individual medley | Stephanie Balduccini; Brazil | Jimena Leguizamón; Colombia | Magdalena Portela; Argentina |
| 4 × 100 m freestyle relay | Brazil; Deyse Goncalves; Beatriz Bezerra; Giovana Reis; Stephanie Balduccini | Colombia; Isabella Bedoya; Tiffany Murillo; Mariana Hoyos; Stefanía Gómez | Venezuela; Mariana Cote; Nicole Gutierrez; Anabella Diaz; Maria Yegres |
| 4 × 100 m medley relay | Brazil; Stephanie Balduccini; Manuela Ballan; Giovana Reis; Beatriz Bezerra | Colombia; Stefanía Gómez; Mariana Hoyos; Jimena Leguizamón; Isabella Bedoya | Argentina; Emma Bertotto; Juana Ortiz; Iara Villalba; Chiara Medun |

Mixed

| Event | Gold | Silver | Bronze |
|---|---|---|---|
| 4 × 100 m freestyle relay | Brazil; Lucas Arantes; Heitor Napolitano; Deyse Goncalves; Beatriz Bezerra | Colombia; Tomas Osorio; Juan Diego Rendon; Mariana Hoyos; Isabella Bedoya | Venezuela; Adrian Vegas; Raul Briceño; Nicole Gutierrez; Nathalie Medina |
| 4 × 100 m medley relay | Brazil; Lucca Cruz; Felipe Ribeiro; Beatriz Bezerra; Giovana Reis | Argentina; Juana Ortiz; Dante Nicola; Valentin Almada; Chiara Medun | Peru; Alexia Sotomayor; Marcelo Rojas; Diego Balbi; Micaela Bernales |

=== Table tennis ===
| Event | Gold | Silver | Bronze |
|---|---|---|---|
| Boys' singles | Leonardo Iizuka; Brazil | Henrique Noguti; Brazil | Cesar Castillo; Venezuela |
| Girls' singles | Giulia Takahashi; Brazil | Laura Watanabe; Brazil | Ana Isaza; Colombia |
| Mixed team | Brazil; Leonardo Iizuka; Henrique Noguti; Giulia Takahashi; Laura Watanabe | Chile; Jaime Lama; Josthyn Miranda; Macarena Reyes; Sofia Vega | Peru; Carlos Fernandez; Maria Maldonado; Alejandra Prieto; Adrian Rubinos |

=== Taekwondo ===
| Event | Gold | Silver | Bronze |
|---|---|---|---|
| Boys' 48 kg | Byron Mery; Ecuador | Luis Peña; Venezuela | Daniel Ramírez; Colombia |
| Boys' 48 kg | Byron Mery; Ecuador | Luis Peña; Venezuela | Edgardo Pastor; Panama |
| Boys' 55 kg | Brayan Garrido; Colombia | Jesus Gonzalez; Venezuela | Gaspar Del Prado; Argentina |
| Boys' 55 kg | Brayan Garrido; Colombia | Jesus Gonzalez; Venezuela | Bastian Gonzalez; Chile |
| Boys' 63 kg | Cristián Olivero; Chile | Ronald Rosas; Colombia | Matheus Marciano; Brazil |
| Boys' 63 kg | Cristián Olivero; Chile | Ronald Rosas; Colombia | Mauricio Ramirez; Ecuador |
| Boys' 73 kg | Luiz Pereira; Brazil | Diego Contreras; Chile | Sebastian Castro; Peru |
| Boys' 73 kg | Luiz Pereira; Brazil | Diego Contreras; Chile | Jose Rodriguez; Venezuela |
| Boys' +73 kg | Henrique Marques; Brazil | César Silva; Colombia | Pedro Leites; Uruguay |
| Boys' +73 kg | Henrique Marques; Brazil | César Silva; Colombia | Roland Lopez; Venezuela |
| Girls' 44 kg | Leidy Salamanca; Colombia | Karen Monteiro; Brazil | Damaris Mendez; Ecuador |
| Girls' 44 kg | Leidy Salamanca; Colombia | Karen Monteiro; Brazil | Yossiani Peceros; Peru |
| Girls' 49 kg | Giulia Sendra; Argentina | Camilly Gosch; Brazil | Angie Prieto; Colombia |
| Girls' 49 kg | Giulia Sendra; Argentina | Camilly Gosch; Brazil | María Sara Grippoli; Uruguay |
| Girls' 55 kg | Rafaella de Arruda; Brazil | Luna Gallo; Colombia | Dianela Leonardelli; Argentina |
| Girls' 55 kg | Rafaella de Arruda; Brazil | Luna Gallo; Colombia | Josefa Orellana; Chile |
| Girls' 63 kg | Maria Eduarda Casagrande; Brazil | Maria Celeste Añez; Bolivia | Luz Belen Beltran; Argentina |
| Girls' 63 kg | Maria Eduarda Casagrande; Brazil | Maria Celeste Añez; Bolivia | Anyelismar Espagarragoza; Venezuela |
| Girls' +63 kg | Thaisa da Silva; Brazil | Matvelin Espinoza; Ecuador | Eugenia Villalba; Venezuela |
| Girls' +63 kg | Thaisa da Silva; Brazil | Matvelin Espinoza; Ecuador | Isabella Fayad; Colombia |

=== Tennis ===
| Event | Gold | Silver | Bronze |
|---|---|---|---|
| Boys' singles | Daniel Vallejo; Paraguay | Lautaro Midón; Argentina | Ignacio Buse; Peru |
| Girls' singles | Luciana Moyano; Argentina | Luisina Giovannini; Argentina | Lucciana Pérez; Peru |
| Boys' doubles | Paraguay; Daniel Vallejo; Martin Vergara | Peru; Gonzalo Bueno; Ignacio Buse | Chile; Alejandro Bancalari; Nicolas Villalon |
| Girls' doubles | Argentina; Luisina Giovannini; Luciana Moyano | Peru; Alessia Martinez; Lucciana Pérez | Ecuador; Tania Andrade; Valeska San Martin |
| Mixed doubles | Argentina; Lautaro Midón; Luciana Moyano | Peru; Gonzalo Bueno; Lucciana Pérez | Paraguay; Leyla Britez; Daniel Vallejo |

=== Triathlon ===
| Event | Gold | Silver | Bronze |
|---|---|---|---|
| Boys' individual | Vinicius Avi; Brazil | Juan Sebastian Dominguez; Ecuador | Luciano Frias; Argentina |
| Girls' individual | Julia Mercaldi; Brazil | Renata Soria; Ecuador | Dominga Jácome; Chile |
| Mixed relay | Chile; Sebastian Colillanca; Ignacio Flores; Dominga Jácome; Sol Ottenhsimer | Brazil; Vinicius Avi; Joao Mazorca; Julia Mercaldi; Sophia Silva | Argentina; Luca Castella; Sofia de Rosas; Erica Frias; Luciano Frias |

=== Weightlifting ===
| Event | Gold | Silver | Bronze |
|---|---|---|---|
| Boys' 55 kg | Benjamin Torres; Chile | Yohanderson Flores; Venezuela | Reny Vargas; Ecuador |
| Boys' 61 kg | David Garcia; Venezuela | Luis Blandón; Colombia | Tobias Ruiz; Argentina |
| Boys' 67 kg | Franchesco Elizalde; Peru | Angel Rodriguez; Venezuela | Erick Estupiñan; Ecuador |
| Boys' 73 kg | Hidver Silva; Peru | Jandry Roldan; Ecuador | Julian Cabral; Argentina |
| Boys' 81 kg | Elkin Ramirez; Ecuador | Felipe Ramos; Brazil | Ramiro Olivera; Argentina |
| Boys' +81 kg | Jhon Martínez; Colombia | Kevin Asto; Ecuador | Carlos Leon; Venezuela |
| Girls' 45 kg | Lawren Estrada; Colombia | Samantha Arreaga; Ecuador | Shany Tezen; Peru |
| Girls' 49 kg | Kerlys Montilla; Venezuela | Giovanna Alves; Brazil | Magali Vega; Argentina |
| Girls' 55 kg | Violeta Fernandez; Paraguay | Luana Monzon; Argentina | Beatriz de Lima; Brazil |
| Girls' 59 kg | Dubaney Sinisterra; Colombia | Jessica Palacios; Ecuador | Claudia Rengifo; Venezuela |
| Girls' 64 kg | Ingrid Segura; Colombia | Keilys Silva; Venezuela | Jheysi Paredes; Peru |
| Girls' +64 kg | Yairan Tysforod; Colombia | Leydi Pavon; Ecuador | Mariangela Martinez; Venezuela |

=== Wrestling ===
| Event | Gold | Silver | Bronze |
|---|---|---|---|
| Boys' Greco-Roman 48 kg | Kleiber Betancourt; Venezuela | Samir Marciaga; Panama | Moises Peralta; Ecuador |
| Boys' Greco-Roman 55 kg | Abel Sanchez; Peru | Marcelo Sialle; Argentina | José Castañeda; Colombia |
| Boys' Greco-Roman 55 kg | Abel Sanchez; Peru | Marcelo Sialle; Argentina | Yorge Cova; Venezuela |
| Boys' Greco-Roman 65 kg | Dalfer Parada; Venezuela | Santiago Pinargote; Ecuador | Johan Sanchez; Bolivia |
| Boys' Greco-Roman 65 kg | Dalfer Parada; Venezuela | Santiago Pinargote; Ecuador | Aymar Janampa; Peru |
| Boys' Greco-Roman 80 kg | Brian Ruiz; Venezuela | Dario Cubas; Peru | Isaac Tenorio; Ecuador |
| Boys' Greco-Roman 110 kg | Samuel Londoño; Colombia | Ibrack Angulo; Ecuador | Mizael Llontop; Peru |
| Boys' freestyle 45 kg | Alvin Tovar; Venezuela | Ismael da Silva; Brazil | Santiago Sánchez; Colombia |
| Boys' freestyle 51 kg | Duvan García; Colombia | Fabricio Rosero; Ecuador | Wenzo Nogueira; Brazil |
| Boys' freestyle 60 kg | Fernando Sandoval; Peru | Roger dos Santos; Brazil | Arnoldo Proboste; Argentina |
| Boys' freestyle 60 kg | Fernando Sandoval; Peru | Roger dos Santos; Brazil | Anderson Montero; Venezuela |
| Boys' freestyle 71 kg | Andrés Riascos; Colombia | Lautaro Destribats; Argentina | Lucas Borbosa; Brazil |
| Boys' freestyle 92 kg | Jose Martinez; Venezuela | Hugo Serafim; Brazil | Fabricio Ibañez; Argentina |
| Girls' freestyle 43 kg | Vicky Leon; Ecuador | Lucielis Castillo; Venezuela | Maria Paula Satiro; Brazil |
| Girls' freestyle 49 kg | Alexa Alvarez; Venezuela | Daniela Moreno; Colombia | Valreia Alvarez; Ecuador |
| Girls' freestyle 49 kg | Alexa Alvarez; Venezuela | Daniela Moreno; Colombia | Yusneiry Agrazal; Panama |
| Girls' freestyle 57 kg | Leonela Gruezo; Ecuador | María Camila Ramírez; Colombia | Maia Cabrera; Argentina |
| Girls' freestyle 65 kg | Gleymaris Beria; Venezuela | Diana Carmona; Colombia | Leidy Hurtado; Ecuador |
| Girls' freestyle 73 kg | Karla Castillo; Venezuela | Angie Medina; Colombia | Rebeca de Oliveira; Brazil |
