= Luana Alonso =

Paraguayan swimmer (born 2004)

Personal information
- Full name: Luana María Alonso Méndez
- Nationality: Paraguay
- Born: 19 March 2004 (age 22) Asunción, Paraguay
- Height: 170 cm (5 ft 7 in)
- Weight: 60 kg (132 lb)

Sport
- Sport: Swimming
- Event: Butterfly
- College team: Virginia Tech Hokies (2021-22) SMU Mustangs (2022-23)
- League: NCAA: ACC; AAC

Luana María Alonso Méndez (Note: In this Spanish name, the first or paternal surname is Alonso and the second or maternal family name is Méndez.) (born 19 March 2004) is a Paraguayan retired swimmer.

== 2020 Tokyo Olympics ==
Alonso attended the 2020 Summer Olympics as a member of the Paraguayan delegation. Competing in the women's 100m butterfly, Alonso finished 6th in her heat and 28th overall, failing to progress to the semifinals.

== Collegiate career ==
In 2021, Alonso enrolled at Virginia Tech and competed for the university's swim team. She finished 30th in 100m butterfly at the 2022 NCAA Swimming & Diving Championships. Prior to the 2022-23 collegiate season, Alonso transferred to Southern Methodist University and once again finished 30th in the 100m butterfly at the NCAA Championships. Alonso did not return to SMU's roster for the 2023-24 season.

== 2024 Paris Olympics ==
During the 2024 Summer Olympics, Alonso competed in the women's 100m butterfly, finishing 6th in her heat, 29th overall, and failing to qualify for the semifinals. Immediately after her race on July 27, Alonso announced her retirement from competitive swimming.

On August 5, it was reported that Alonso had been asked to leave the Olympic Village by Paraguay's chef de mission for creating an "inappropriate atmosphere" around the team. Comments from the President of the Paraguayan Olympic Committee on a Paraguayan radio show appeared to indicate that the decision to remove Alonso came after she made an unauthorized trip to Disneyland Paris. Meanwhile, the Paraguayan digital newspaper Hoy reported that Alonso had spoken about her reluctance to represent Paraguay on a livestream prior to the Games, instead expressing a desire to represent the United States. On August 6, Alonso addressed her expulsion, stating that she had indeed left the Games but had done so of her own free will. Alonso stated that she had left the Olympic Village and checked into a Parisian hotel.

== Post-swimming career ==
In October 2024, Alonso announced that she had started an OnlyFans account.

== Records ==
Alonso holds a number of national records for women's swimming:

Short course (25m)

- 50m butterfly
- 100m butterfly
- 200m butterfly
- 200m individual medley

Long course (50m)

- 50m backstroke
- 50m butterfly
- 100m butterfly
- 200m butterfly
