= South American Youth Games =

Sports event in South America

The South American Youth Games (Spanish: Juegos Suramericanos de la Juventud; Portuguese: Jogos Sul-Americanos da Juventude) is a regional multi-sport event organized by the Organización Deportiva Suramericana (ODESUR). The games are held every four years consistent with the current Olympic Games format. The first edition was held in Lima, Peru, from 20 to 29 September 2013. The age limitation of the athletes is 14 to 18.

== South American Youth Games editions ==
| Edition | Year | Host city | Host nation | Start date | End date | Nations | Competitors | Sports | Events | Top placed team | Ref. |
|---|---|---|---|---|---|---|---|---|---|---|---|
| 1 | 2013 | Lima | Peru | 20 September | 29 September | 14 | 1,200 | 19 | 178 | Brazil | |
| 2 | 2017 | Santiago | Chile | 29 September | 8 October | 14 | 1,279 | 20 | 209 | Brazil | |
| 3 | 2022 | Rosario | Argentina | 28 April | 8 May | 15 | 2,500 | 26 | 205 | Brazil | |
| 4 | 2026 | Panama City | Panama | 12 April | 25 April | 15 | 2,000 | 24 | 211 | Brazil | |

Host cities of the South American Youth Games

== Medal count ==
All-time Medal count as of 2026.

| Rank | Nation | Gold | Silver | Bronze | Total |
|---|---|---|---|---|---|
| 1 | Brazil (BRA) | 255 | 174 | 168 | 597 |
| 2 | Colombia (COL) | 136 | 106 | 129 | 371 |
| 3 | Argentina (ARG) | 113 | 114 | 157 | 384 |
| 4 | Venezuela (VEN) | 91 | 95 | 115 | 301 |
| 5 | Chile (CHL) | 62 | 78 | 109 | 249 |
| 6 | Ecuador (ECU) | 56 | 97 | 100 | 253 |
| 7 | Peru (PER) | 40 | 63 | 94 | 197 |
| 8 | Panama (PAN) | 14 | 15 | 30 | 59 |
| 9 | Uruguay (URU) | 13 | 21 | 28 | 62 |
| 10 | Paraguay (PAR) | 11 | 17 | 24 | 52 |
| 11 | Bolivia (BOL) | 4 | 11 | 17 | 32 |
| 12 | Guyana (GUY) | 4 | 5 | 9 | 18 |
| 13 | Aruba (ARU) | 2 | 2 | 6 | 10 |
| 14 | Suriname (SUR) | 0 | 1 | 8 | 9 |
| 15 | Curaçao (CUR) | 0 | 1 | 1 | 2 |
| Totals (15 entries) | | 801 | 800 | 995 | 2,596 |

== See also ==
- Youth Olympic Games
- Under-18 athletics
