= Felipe Delgado (swimmer) =

Ecuadorian swimmer (born 1973)

Personal information
- Full name: Felipe Delgado Martillo
- Nationality: Ecuador
- Born: July 14, 1973 (age 52) Mission Viejo, California, United States
- Height: 1.82 m (6 ft 0 in)
- Weight: 80 kg (176 lb)

Sport
- Sport: Swimming
- Strokes: Freestyle
- Club: NOVA

Felipe Delgado, born Felipe Delgado Martillo on July 14, 1973, is an Ecuadorian swimmer who is a competitor in 50m & 100m Freestyle.

At the 1995 Pan American Games in Mar del Plata, he finished 6th in the 50-metre freestyle, 7th in the 200-metre freestyle, and 8th in the 100-metre freestyle.

At the 1996 Summer Olympics in Atlanta, Delgado finished 25th in the 50-meter freestyle, 38th in the 100-meter freestyle, 40th in the 200-meter freestyle, and 15th in the 4x100-meter freestyle.

At the 2000 Summer Olympics in Sydney, Delgado finished 56th in the 100-meter freestyle.

Olympic Games
Preceded by María Cangá	Flag bearer for Ecuador; Atlanta 1996	Succeeded by Martha Tenorio
