= Peru at the 2025 World Aquatics Championships =

- Flag of Peru
- World Aquatics code: PER
- National federation: Peruvian Sports Swimming Federation
- Website: fdpn.org (in Spanish)

in Singapore
- Competitors: 9 in 4 sports
- Medals: Gold 0 Silver 0 Bronze 0 Total 0

World Aquatics Championships appearances
- 1973; 1975; 1978; 1982; 1986; 1991; 1994; 1998; 2001; 2003; 2005; 2007; 2009; 2011; 2013; 2015; 2017; 2019; 2022; 2023; 2024; 2025

Peru competed at the 2025 World Aquatics Championships in Singapore from July 11 to August 3, 2025.

== Competitors ==
The following is the list of competitors in the Championships.

| Sport | Men | Women | Total |
|---|---|---|---|
| Artistic swimming | 0 | 3 | 3 |
| Diving | 0 | 1 | 1 |
| Open water swimming | 1 | 1 | 2 |
| Swimming | 0 | 3 | 3 |
| Total | 1 | 8 | 9 |

== Artistic swimming ==
Women

| Athlete | Event | Preliminaries | | Final | |
| Athlete | Event | Points | Rank | Points | Rank |
|---|---|---|---|---|---|
| Ariana Coronado | Solo technical routine | 200.2917 | 25 | Did not advance | |
| Ariana Coronado | Solo free routine | 183.0175 | 19 | Did not advance | |
| María Ccoyllo; Lía Luna | Duet technical routine | 201.0175 | 33 | Did not advance | |
| María Ccoyllo; Lía Luna | Duet free routine | 187.5567 | 26 | Did not advance | |

== Diving ==
Women

| Athlete | Event | Preliminaries | | Semifinals | | Final | |
| Athlete | Event | Points | Rank | Points | Rank | Points | Rank |
|---|---|---|---|---|---|---|---|
| Ana Ricci | 1 m springboard | 206.40 | 37 | — | | Did not advance | |
| Ana Ricci | 3 m springboard | 229.10 | 34 | Did not advance | | | |

== Open water swimming ==
Men

| Athlete | Event | Heat | | Semi-final | | Final | |
| Athlete | Event | Time | Rank | Time | Rank | Time | Rank |
|---|---|---|---|---|---|---|---|
| Adrian Ywanaga | Men's 3 km knockout sprints | Did not start | | Did not advance | | | |
| Adrian Ywanaga | Men's 5 km | — | | | | 1:02:15.4 | 41 |
| Adrian Ywanaga | Men's 10 km | — | | | | 2:21:45.1 | 57 |

Women

| Athlete | Event | Heat | | Semi-final | | Final | |
| Athlete | Event | Time | Rank | Time | Rank | Time | Rank |
|---|---|---|---|---|---|---|---|
| María Fernanda Arellanos | Women's 3 km knockout sprints | Did not start | | Did not advance | | | |
| María Fernanda Arellanos | Women's 5 km | — | | | | 1:13:46.0 | 59 |
| María Fernanda Arellanos | Women's 10 km | — | | | | 2:36:13.8 | 53 |

== Swimming ==
Peru entered 3 swimmers.

Women

| Athlete | Event | Heat | | Semi-final | | Final | |
| Athlete | Event | Time | Rank | Time | Rank | Time | Rank |
|---|---|---|---|---|---|---|---|
| Cielo Moya | 50 m freestyle | 26.62 | 49 | Did not advance | | | |
| Cielo Moya | 50 m butterfly | 27.16 | 36 | Did not advance | | | |
| Yasmin Silva Contreras | 200 m butterfly | 2:13.72 | 22 | Did not advance | | | |
| Yasmin Silva Contreras | 200 m individual medley | 2:26.57 | 35 | Did not advance | | | |
| Alexia Sotomayor | 200 m backstroke | 2:14.56 | 30 | Did not advance | | | |
| Alexia Sotomayor | 100 m butterfly | 1:01.38 | 36 | Did not advance | | | |
