= List of Peruvian records in swimming =

The Peru Records in swimming are the fastest times ever swum by an individual from Peru. These national records are maintained by Peru's national swimming federation: Federación Deportiva Peruana de Natación (FDPN).

FDPN keeps records for both for men and women, for both long course (50m) and short course (25m) events. Records are kept in the following events (by stroke):

- freestyle: 50, 100, 200, 400, 800 and 1500;
- backstroke: 50, 100 and 200;
- breaststroke: 50, 100 and 200;
- butterfly: 50, 100 and 200;
- individual medley: 100 (25m only), 200 and 400;
- relays: 200 free (25m only), 400 free, 800 free, 200 medley (25m only), and 400 medley.

All records swum in finals, unless noted otherwise.

== Long Course (50m) ==
=== Men ===
| Event | Time | | Name | Club | Date | Meet | Location | Ref |
|---|---|---|---|---|---|---|---|---|
| 50 m freestyle | 23.08 | | Sebastian Arispe Silva | Peru | 22 November 2017 | Bolivarian Games | Santa Marta, Colombia | |
| 100 m freestyle | 50.29 | | Mauricio Fiol | Regatas Lima | 16 May 2013 | Peruvian Club Championships | Lima, Peru | |
| 200 m freestyle | 1:49.62 | | Joaquín Vargas | Tennessee Aquatics | 12 May 2023 | Atlanta Classic | Atlanta, United States | |
| 400 m freestyle | 3:52.18 | | Joaquín Vargas | Azura Florida Aquatics | 1 May 2021 | UANA Tokyo Qualifier | Clermont, United States | |
| 800 m freestyle | 8:11.70 | | Joaquín Vargas | Azura Florida Aquatics | 21 May 2021 | Puerto Rican International Open | Salinas, Puerto Rico | |
| 1500 m freestyle | 15:44.52 | | Domenico Sotomayor | Peru | 28 May 2026 | Mare Nostrum | Canet-en-Roussillon, France | |
| 50 m backstroke | 26.57 | | Joshua Balbi | Saint Andrew's Aquatics | 18 July 2024 | FG Senior Championships | Coral Springs, United States | |
| 50 m backstroke | 26.56 | r, # | Joshua Balbi | Florida Atlantic Aquatics | 25 July 2026 | FL RAFC Last Splash Invitational | Orlando, United States | |
| 100 m backstroke | 56.96 | | Santiago Cobos | Centro Naval del Perú | 17 June 2021 | Panamerican Junior Championships Selection | Peru | |
| 200 m backstroke | 2:03.10 | h | Alejandro Alvizuri | Peru | 28 July 1992 | Olympic Games | Barcelona, Spain | |
| 50m breaststroke | 28.96 | | Mariano Gomez-Sanchez | Club Deportivo Atlantis | 30 January 2026 | Chilean Summer Championships | Santiago, Chile | |
| 100m breaststroke | 1:03.06 | h | Ian Heysen | Blue Dolfins | 31 July 2026 | USA Championships | Irvine, United States | |
| 200m breaststroke | 2:14.86 | h | Ian Heysen | Blue Dolfins | 29 July 2026 | USA Championships | Irvine, United States | |
| 50m butterfly | 24.31 | c | Diego Balbi | Saint Andrew's Aquatics | 2 May 2025 | TYR Pro Swim Series | Fort Lauderdale, United States | |
| 100m butterfly | 52.91 | | Mauricio Fiol | Regatas Lima | 16 May 2013 | Peruvian Club Championships | Lima, Peru | |
| 100m butterfly | 52.25 | h, (Note: Unratified due to doping violation) | Mauricio Fiol | Peru | 16 July 2015 | Pan American Games | Toronto, Canada | |
| 200m butterfly | 1:58.29 | | Mauricio Fiol | Peru | 30 July 2013 | World Championships | Barcelona, Spain | |
| 200m butterfly | 1:55.15 | not ratified (Note: Unratified due to doping violation) | Mauricio Fiol | Peru | 14 July 2015 | Pan American Games | Toronto, Canada | |
| 200m individual medley | 2:03.22 | h | Ian Heysen | Blue Dolfins | 1 August 2026 | USA Championships | Irvine, United States | |
| 400m individual medley | 4:23.91 | h | Ian Heysen | Blue Dolfins | 30 July 2026 | USA Championships | Irvine, United States | |
| 4×50m freestyle relay | 1:35.78 | | Sebastián Jahnsen; Sebastián Arispe; L. Salazar; M.A. Yaber-Davila | Regatas Lima | 10 February 2009 | - | Peru | |
| 4×100m freestyle relay | 3:25.08 | | Ricardo Espinosa (51.40); Joaquín Vargas (51.57); Ian Ricci (51.69); Rafael Ponce (50.42) | Peru | 2 October 2024 | South American Championships | Cali, Colombia | |
| 4×200m freestyle relay | 7:32.74 | | Rafael Ponce (1:53.32); Joaquín Vargas (1:50.66); Ricardo Espinosa (1:55.37); Javier Nicolas (1:53.39) | Peru | 28 November 2021 | Junior Pan American Games | Cali, Colombia | |
| 4×50m medley relay | 1:45.46 | | Carlos Cobos; Santiago Won; Javier Tang; Ricardo Espinosa | Peru | 14 December 2020 | Peru | | |
| 4×100m medley relay | 3:46.42 | | Joshua Balbi (58.23); Ian Ricci (1:04.28); Diego Balbi (53.59); Rafael Ponce (50.32) | Peru | 2 October 2024 | South American Championships | Cali, Colombia | |

Legend: # – Record awaiting ratification by FDPN; WR – World record; AM – Americas record; e – equalled existing record;
Records not set in finals: h – heat; sf – semifinal; r – relay 1st leg; rh – relay heat 1st leg; b – B final; † – en route to final mark; so – swim-off; tt – time trial

=== Women ===
| Event | Time | | Name | Club | Date | Meet | Location | Ref |
|---|---|---|---|---|---|---|---|---|
| 50 m freestyle | 25.80 | | Rafaela Fernandini | Regatas Lima | 18 July 2025 | II Multiple Selection Finals | Lima, Puerto Rico | |
| 100 m freestyle | 56.20 | | McKenna DeBever | Tennessee Aquatics | 24 May 2024 | Tennessee Aquatics Club May Invite | Knoxville, United States | |
| 100 m freestyle | 55.65 | # | Rafaela Fernandini | Peru | 13 September 2026 | South American Games | Santa Fe, Argentina | |
| 200 m freestyle | 2:02.38 | | McKenna DeBever | - | 6 April 2017 | Canadian Trials | Victoria, Canada | |
| 400 m freestyle | 4:17.21 | | Andrea Cedrón | GCC | March 2015 | - | Peru | |
| 800 m freestyle | 8:49.83 | | María Bramont-Arias | Peru | 11 November 2018 | South American Championships | Trujillo, Peru | |
| 1500 m freestyle | 16:44.16 | | María Bramont-Arias | Peru | 9 November 2018 | South American Championships | Trujillo, Peru | |
| 50 m backstroke | 29.04 | | McKenna DeBever | Tennessee Aquatics | 24 May 2024 | Tennessee Aquatics Club May Invite | Knoxville, United States | |
| 100 m backstroke | 1:01.99 | tt | McKenna DeBever | Tennessee Aquatics | 16 May 2024 | Atlanta Classic | Atlanta, United States | |
| 200 m backstroke | 2:13.80 | | Alexia Sotomayor | Peru | 4 October 2022 | South American Games | Asunción, Paraguay | |
| 50 m breaststroke | 32.53 | | Valeria Silva | Peru | 12 March 2008 | South American Championships | São Paulo, Brazil | |
| 100 m breaststroke | 1:11.08 | b | Paula Tamashiro | Peru | 6 August 2019 | Pan American Games | Lima, Peru | |
| 200 m breaststroke | 2:35.34 | | Paula Tamashiro | Peru | 11 November 2018 | South American Championships | Trujillo, Peru | |
| 50 m butterfly | 26.97 | | Alexia Sotomayor | Tennessee Aquatics | 19 July 2024 | Torneo de Marcas Clasificatorias SA, PA y CP | Lima, Peru | |
| 100 m butterfly | 1:00.16 | h | McKenna DeBever | Tennessee Aquatics | 14 May 2021 | TYR Pro Swim Series | Indianapolis, United States | |
| 200 m butterfly | 2:11.86 | | Yasmin Silva | Peru | 27 May 2026 | Mare Nostrum | Canet-en-Roussillon, France | |
| 200 m individual medley | 2:14.70 | | McKenna DeBever | Tennessee Aquatics | 18 May 2024 | Atlanta Classic | Atlanta, United States | |
| 400 m individual medley | 4:53.18 | | Maria F Muñoz | AXT | 18 December 2019 | Peruvian Open Championships | | |
| 4×50 m freestyle relay | 1:48.70 | | L. Espinosa; E. Sims; A. Moreno; M. Bernales | Regatas Limas | 21 March 2026 | Peru | | |
| 4×100 m freestyle relay | 3:49.08 | | Rafaela Fernandini; McKenna DeBever; Jessica Cattaneo; Alexia Sotomayor | Peru | 4 October 2022 | South American Games | Asunción, Paraguay | |
| 4×200 m freestyle relay | 8:18.85 | | Andrea Cedrón (2:03.24); Jessica Cattaneo (2:04.63); Azra Avdic (2:05.57); Daniela Miyahara (2:05.41) | Peru | 2 April 2016 | South American Championships | Asunción, Paraguay | |
| 4×50 m medley relay | 2:02.01 | | Alexia Sotomayor; S. Cabrera; S. Miyake; Rafaela Fernandini | Peru | 14 December 2020 | Peru | | |
| 4×100 m medley relay | 4:14.12 | | Alexia Sotomayor (1:04.68); Paula Tamashiro (1:10.75); Maria Muñoz Machuca (1:02.49); McKenna DeBever (56.20) | Peru | 10 August 2019 | Pan American Games | Lima, Peru | |

Legend: # – Record awaiting ratification by FDPN; WR – World record; AM – Americas record; e – equalled existing record;
Records not set in finals: h – heat; sf – semifinal; r – relay 1st leg; rh – relay heat 1st leg; b – B final; † – en route to final mark; so – swim-off; tt – time trial

=== Mixed relay ===
| Event | Time | | Name | Club | Date | Meet | Location | Ref |
|---|---|---|---|---|---|---|---|---|
| 4×50 m freestyle relay | 1:40.89 | | Rafaela Fernandini; Alexia Sotomayor; Ricardo Espinosa; Javier Tang | Peru | 14 December 2020 | | | |
| 4×50 m freestyle relay | 1:39.93 | not ratified | Miguel Zavaleta; Rafaela Fernandini; Jessica Cattaneo; Ricardo Espinosa | Peru | 5 June 2022 | PanAm Age Group Championship | Couva, Trinidad and Tobago | |
| 4×100 m freestyle relay | 3:38.29 | | Ricardo Espinosa (51.44); Cristobal Amiel (52.28); Micaela Bernales (57.89); Rafaela Fernandini (56.68) | Regatas Lima | 24 November 2024 | Peruvian Championships | Lima, Peru | |
| 4×50 m medley relay | 1:52.66 | | Micaela Bernales; Mariano Gomez-Sanchez; Augusto Ssosa; Andrea Moreno | Regatas Lima | 20 March 2026 | Regatas Lima Cup | Lima, Peru | |
| 4×100 m medley relay | 3:58.29 | | Alexia Sotomayor (1:04.42); Ian Heysen (1:03.55); Diego Balbi (53.30); Rafaela Fernandini (57.02) | Peru | 3 October 2024 | South American Championships | Cali, Colombia | |

Legend: # – Record awaiting ratification by FDPN; WR – World record; AM – Americas record; e – equalled existing record;
Records not set in finals: h – heat; so – swim-off

== Short Course (25 m) ==
=== Men ===
| Event | Time | | Name | Club | Date | Meet | Location | Ref |
|---|---|---|---|---|---|---|---|---|
| 50 m freestyle | 22.51 | | Miguel Zavaleta | GCC | 16 November 2019 | VI Copa Nacional Ciudad de Trujillo | Trujillo, Peru | |
| 100 m freestyle | 48.81 | h | Rafael Ponce | Peru | 11 December 2024 | World Championships | Budapest, Hungary | |
| 200 m freestyle | 1:45.68 | | Joaquín Vargas | Azura Florida Aquatics | 30 October 2021 | Puerto Rico International Open | San Juan, Puerto Rico | |
| 400 m freestyle | 3:43.32 | | Joaquín Vargas | Azura Florida Aquatics | 29 October 2021 | Puerto Rico International Open | San Juan, Puerto Rico | |
| 800 m freestyle | 7:54.95 | | Rafael Ponce | AquaXtreme | 6 June 2024 | Peruvian Championships | Lima, Peru | |
| 1500 m freestyle | 15:16.97 | | Domenico Sotomayor | AquaXtreme | 11 June 2026 | Peruvian Championships | Lima, Peru | |
| 50m backstroke | 25.24 | | Ricardo Espinosa | Regatas Lima | 27 August 2026 | World Championships Selection Meet | Lima, Peru | |
| 100m backstroke | 53.72 | | Joaquín Vargas | Azura Florida Aquatics | 31 October 2021 | Puerto Rico International Open | San Juan, Puerto Rico | |
| 200m backstroke | 1:57.57 | | Carlos Santiago Cobos | Peru | 30 September 2021 | Campeonato Selectivo Mundual | Peru | |
| 50m breaststroke | 28.28 | = | Javier Matta | MNC | 29 December 2021 | Torneo Internacional de Navidad | Peru | |
| 50m breaststroke | 28.28 | = | Ian Heysen | Regatas Lima | 6 June 2025 | Peruvian Championships | Lima, Peru | |
| 100m breaststroke | 1:00.89 | | Javier Matta | Madrid N.C. | 20 December 2023 | Spanish Club Cup Division of Honor | Barcelona, Spain | |
| 200m breaststroke | 2:09.94 | | Ian Heysen | Regatas Lima | 7 June 2025 | Peruvian Age Group Championships | Lima, Peru | |
| 50 m butterfly | 23.26 | tt | Anthony Puertas | Planeta Aqua | 11 October 2024 | Puerto Rico International Open | San Juan, Puerto Rico | |
| 100 m butterfly | 51.77 | h | Javier Matta | Peru | 17 December 2022 | World Championships | Melbourne, Australia | |
| 200 m butterfly | 1:53.47 | | Mauricio Fiol | Peru | 17 October 2012 | World Cup | Moscow, Russia | |
| 100 m individual medley | 53.75 | h | Javier Matta | Peru | 15 December 2022 | World Championships | Melbourne, Australia | |
| 200 m individual medley | 2:00.16 | | Ian Heysen | Regatas Lima | 8 June 2025 | Peruvian Championships | Lima, Peru | |
| 400 m individual medley | 4:19.78 | | Ian Heysen | Regatas Lima | 4 June 2025 | Peruvian Championships | Lima, Peru | |
| 4×50 m freestyle relay | 1:32.97 | | M.A. Yaber-Davila; L. Salazar; Jusuf Ustavdich; Sebastian Jahnsen | Regatas Lima | 21 December 2009 | - | Peru | |
| 4×100 m freestyle relay | 3:25.02 | | Ian Heysen (50.72); Augusto Sosa (51.80); Mariano Gomez (51.39); Cristobal Amiel (51.11) | Regatas Lima | 4 June 2025 | Peruvian Championships | Lima, Peru | |
| 4×200 m freestyle relay | 7:32.57 | | Gabriel Masto (1:55.00); Mariano Gomez (1:54.62); Cristobal Amiel (1:53.04); Ian Heysen (1:49.91) | Regatas Lima | 8 June 2025 | Peruvian Championships | Lima, Peru | |
| 4×50 m medley relay | 1:45.30 | | Mauricio Fiol; Santiago Won; J. Aspillaga; Sebastian Jahnsen | Regatas Lima | 5 October 2012 | - | Peru | |
| 4×100 m medley relay | 3:36.61 | h | Joaquín Vargas (54.36); Anthony Puertas (1:02.44); Diego Balbi (51.73); Rafael Ponce (48.08) | Peru | 15 December 2024 | World Championships | Budapest, Hungary | |

Legend: # – Record awaiting ratification by FDPN; WR – World record; AM – Americas record; e – equalled existing record;
Records not set in finals: h – heat; sf – semifinal; r – relay 1st leg; rh – relay heat 1st leg; b – B final; † – en route to final mark; so – swim-off; tt – time trial

=== Women ===
| Event | Time | | Name | Club | Date | Meet | Location | Ref |
|---|---|---|---|---|---|---|---|---|
| 50m freestyle | 24.95 | | Cielo Moya | H2go | 8 June 2025 | Peruvian Championships | Lima, Peru | |
| 100m freestyle | 54.28 | | Rafaela Fernandini | Regatas Lima | 13 June 2026 | Peruvian Championships | Lima, Peru | |
| 200m freestyle | 2:00.17 | | McKenna DeBever | Surco | 13 September 2018 | World Championships Trials | Peru | |
| 400m freestyle | 4:12.09 | | María Bramont-Arias | Surco | 19 July 2018 | Peruvian Championships | Peru | |
| 800m freestyle | 8:36.49 | | María Bramont-Arias | Surco | 19 July 2018 | Campeonato Nacional de Categorias | Peru | |
| 1500m freestyle | 16:19.75 | | María Bramont-Arias | Surco | 19 July 2018 | Campeonato Nacional de Categorias | Peru | |
| 50m backstroke | 28.06 | h | Alexia Sotomayor | Peru | 15 December 2022 | World Championships | Melbourne, Australia | |
| 100m backstroke | 59.98 | | Alexia Sotomayor | Arizona State University | 22 October 2026 | Arizona State vs Southern Methodist | Tempe, United States | |
| 200m backstroke | 2:09.29 | | Alexia Sotomayor | Unattached | 21 July 2022 | Peruvian Championships | Lima, Peru | |
| 50m breaststroke | 32.40 | | Paula Tamashiro | Asociación Estadio La Unión | 14 August 2019 | Peruvian Championships | Peru | |
| 100m breaststroke | 1:10.92 | | Valeria Silva | Regatas Lima | 25 February 2002 | - | Peru | |
| 200m breaststroke | 2:31.50 | | Paula Tamashiro | Asociación Estadio La Unión | 6 October 2016 | World Championships Trials | Peru | |
| 50m butterfly | 26.53 | | Cielo Moya | H2go | 5 June 2025 | Peruvian Championships | Lima, Peru | |
| 100m butterfly | 1:00.10 | | Alexia Sotomayor | AquaXtreme | 7 June 2024 | Peruvian Championships | Lima, Peru | |
| 200m butterfly | 2:10.28 | | Yasmin Silva | Streamline | 12 June 2026 | Peruvian Championships | Lima, Peru | |
| 100m individual medley | 1:00.48 | h | McKenna DeBever | Peru | 15 December 2022 | World Championships | Melbourne, Australia | |
| 200m individual medley | 2:11.45 | h | McKenna DeBever | Peru | 5 November 2022 | World Cup | Indianapolis, United States | |
| 400m individual medley | 4:44.45 | | Maria Fe Muñoz | Nadadores Libres | 22 October 2022 | Puerto Rico International Open | San Juan, Puerto Rico | |
| 4×50m freestyle relay | 1:43.84 | h | Rafaela Fernandini (25.18); McKenna DeBever (25.20); Maria Fe Muñoz (27.22); Alexia Sotomayor (26.24) | Peru | 14 December 2022 | World Championships | Melbourne, Australia | |
| 4×50m freestyle relay | 1:43.69 | not ratified or later rescinded | A. Marin; Y. Ochoa; K. Makabe; S. Asparria | Macro Región 3 | 8 November 2012 | Macro Region 3 | Peru | |
| 4×100m freestyle relay | 3:47.22 | h | Rafaela Fernandini (55.43); McKenna DeBever (55.68); Alexia Sotomayor (57.86); María Fe Muñoz (58.25) | Peru | 13 December 2022 | World Championships | Melbourne, Australia | |
| 4×200m freestyle relay | 8:16.98 | | M. Bernales; V. Quispe; L. Espinosa; Rafaela Fernandini | Regatas Limas | 14 June 2026 | Peruvian Championships | Lima, Peru | |
| 4×50m medley relay | 1:54.18 | h | Alexia Sotomayor (28.50); McKenna DeBever (32.35); Maria Fe Muñoz (28.21); Rafaela Fernandini (25.12) | Peru | 17 December 2022 | World Championships | Melbourne, Australia | |
| 4×100m medley relay | 4:12.73 | h | Alexia Sotomayor (1:01.44); McKenna DeBever (1:11.26); Maria Fe Muñoz (1:03.21); Rafaela Fernandini (56.82) | Peru | 18 December 2022 | World Championships | Melbourne, Australia | |

Legend: # – Record awaiting ratification by FDPN; WR – World record; AM – Americas record; e – equalled existing record;
Records not set in finals: h – heat; sf – semifinal; r – relay 1st leg; rh – relay heat 1st leg; b – B final; † – en route to final mark; so – swim-off; tt – time trial

=== Mixed relay ===
| Event | Time | | Name | Club | Date | Meet | Location | Ref |
|---|---|---|---|---|---|---|---|---|
| 4×50 m freestyle relay | 1:35.41 | h | Javier Nicolas (22.05); Joaquín Vargas (22.91); Rafaela Fernandini (24.99); McKenna DeBever (25.46) | Peru | 16 December 2022 | World Championships | Melbourne, Australia | |
| 4×100 m freestyle relay | 3:36.39 | | Ricardo Espinosa; Javier Tang; Rafaela Fernandini; Alexia Sotomayor | Peru | 23 October 2020 | Peru | | |
| 4×50 m medley relay | 1:45.80 | h | Alexia Sotomayor (28.64); Javier Nicolas (26.58); Rafaela Fernandini (27.65); Joaquín Vargas (22.93) | Peru | 14 December 2022 | World Championships | Melbourne, Australia | |
| 4×100 m medley relay | 3:49.95 | | Alexia Sotomayor (1:00.74); Anthony Puertas (1:02.00); Diego Balbi (51.80); Rafaela Fernandini (55.41) | Peru | 14 December 2024 | World Championships | Budapest, Hungary | |

Legend: # – Record awaiting ratification by FDPN; WR – World record; AM – Americas record; e – equalled existing record;
Records not set in finals: h – heat; so – swim-off
