= Peru at the 2023 World Aquatics Championships =

- Flag of Peru
- World Aquatics code: PER
- National federation: Peruvian Sports Swimming Federation
- Website: fdpn.org (in Spanish)

in Fukuoka, Japan
- Competitors: 10 in 4 sports
- Medals: Gold 0 Silver 0 Bronze 0 Total 0

World Aquatics Championships appearances
- 1973; 1975; 1978; 1982; 1986; 1991; 1994; 1998; 2001; 2003; 2005; 2007; 2009; 2011; 2013; 2015; 2017; 2019; 2022; 2023; 2024; 2025

Peru is set to compete at the 2023 World Aquatics Championships in Fukuoka, Japan from 14 to 30 July.

== Artistic swimming ==
Peru entered 2 artistic swimmers.

Mixed

Athlete	Event	Preliminaries		Final	
Athlete	Event	Points	Rank	Points	Rank
Álvaro Aronés; Sandy Quiroz	Duet technical routine	177.0883	9 Q	187.5250	12
Álvaro Aronés; Sandy Quiroz	Duet free routine	135.4417	10 Q	121.0668	11

== Diving ==
Peru entered 2 divers.

Men

Athlete	Event	Preliminaries		Semifinals		Final	
Athlete	Event	Points	Rank	Points	Rank	Points	Rank
Jesús Liranzo	1 m springboard	313.50	26	—N/a		Did not advance	
Jesús Liranzo	3 m springboard	275.00	58	Did not advance			

Women

Athlete	Event	Preliminaries		Semifinals		Final	
Athlete	Event	Points	Rank	Points	Rank	Points	Rank
Ana Ricci	1 m springboard	199.35	38	—N/a		Did not advance	
Ana Ricci	3 m springboard	207.75	43	Did not advance			

== Open water swimming ==
Peru entered 2 open water swimmers.

Men

Athlete	Event	Time	Rank
Adrián Ywanaga	Men's 5 km	1:00:08.1	45
Adrián Ywanaga	Men's 10 km	2:02:36.0	44

Women

Athlete	Event	Time	Rank
María Bramont-Arias	Women's 5 km	1:01:09.4	15
María Bramont-Arias	Women's 10 km	2:04:11.9	22

== Swimming ==
Peru entered 5 swimmers.

Men

Athlete	Event	Heat		Semifinal		Final	
Athlete	Event	Time	Rank	Time	Rank	Time	Rank
Diego Balbi	100 metre butterfly	53.92	44	Did not advance			
Diego Balbi	200 metre butterfly	2:03.61	32	Did not advance			
Joaquín Vargas	200 metre freestyle	1:49.85	36	Did not advance			
Joaquín Vargas	400 metre freestyle	3:53.54	28	—N/a		Did not advance	

Women

Athlete	Event	Heat		Semifinal		Final	
Athlete	Event	Time	Rank	Time	Rank	Time	Rank
María Bramont-Arias	800 metre freestyle	8:59.52	31	—N/a		Did not advance	
María Bramont-Arias	1500 metre freestyle	17:04.19	27	—N/a		Did not advance	
McKenna DeBever	100 metre backstroke	1:03.12	38	Did not advance			
McKenna DeBever	200 metre individual medley	2:17.33	28	Did not advance			
Alexia Sotomayor	50 metre backstroke	30.12	41	Did not advance			
Alexia Sotomayor	200 metre backstroke	2:20.78	34	Did not advance			

Mixed

Athlete	Event	Heat		Final	
Athlete	Event	Time	Rank	Time	Rank
Alexia Sotomayor; McKenna DeBever; Diego Balbi; Joaquín Vargas	4 × 100 m medley relay	4:05.00	25	Did not advance	
