= Swimming at the 2019 Pan American Games – Women's 4 × 200 metre freestyle relay =

Women's 4 × 200 metre freestyle relay at the 2019 Pan American Games
- Venue: Villa Deportiva Nacional, VIDENA
- Dates: August 9 (Final)
- Competitors: 32 from 8 nations
- Winning time: 7:57.33

Medalists
Gold medal	Claire Rasmus; Alexandra Walsh; Sarah Gibson; Meaghan Raab	United States
Silver medal	Alyson Ackman; Katerine Savard; Danica Ludlow; Mary-Sophie Harvey	Canada
Bronze medal	Aline Rodrigues; Larissa Oliveira; Manuella Lyrio; Gabrielle Roncatto	Brazil

The women's 4 × 200 metre freestyle relay competition of the swimming events at the 2019 Pan American Games are scheduled to be held August 9, 2019 at the Villa Deportiva Nacional Videna cluster.

== Records ==
Prior to this competition, the existing world and Pan American Games records were as follows:

World record	Australia (AUS); Ariarne Titmus (1:54.27); Madison Wilson (1:56.73); Brianna Throssell (1:55.60); Emma McKeon (1:54.90)	7:41.50	Gwangju, South Korea	July 25, 2019
Pan American Games record	United States (USA); Kiera Janzen (1:59.61); Allison Schmitt (1:55.98); Courtney Harnish (1:59.61); Gillian Ryanl (1:59.12)	7:54.32	Toronto, Canada	July 16, 2015

== Results ==
KEY:	q	Fastest non-qualifiers	Q	Qualified	GR	Games record	NR	National record	PB	Personal best	SB	Seasonal best

=== Final ===
The final round was held on August 9.

Rank	Lane	Name	Nationality	Time	Notes
1st place, gold medalist(s)	4	Claire Rasmus (1:59.17); Alexandra Walsh (1:58.27); Sarah Gibson (2:01.75); Meaghan Raab (1:58.14)	United States	7:57.33	
2nd place, silver medalist(s)	5	Alyson Ackman (1:59.55); Katerine Savard (2:00.36); Danica Ludlow (1:59.83); Mary-Sophie Harvey (1:59.42)	Canada	7:59.16	
3rd place, bronze medalist(s)	3	Aline Rodrigues (1:59.56); Larissa Oliveira (2:01.69); Manuella Lyrio (2:01.59); Gabrielle Roncatto (2:04.93)	Brazil	8:07.77	
4	6	Delfina Pignatiello ( 2:02.61); Florencia Perotti (2:04.54); Virginia Bardach (2:03.07); Andrea Berrino (2:05.50)	Argentina	8:15.72	
5	2	María Mata Cocco (2:03.42); Allyson Macías Alba (2:03.42); Monika González-Hermosillo (2:06.52); Marie Conde Merlos (2:02.82)	Mexico	8:19.97	
6	7	Lorena González Mendoza (2:05.68); Laurent Estrada (2:08.01); Andrea Becali Martí (2:06.55); Elisbet Gámez (2:06.61)	Cuba	8:23.06	
7	8	Samantha Bello (2:04.90); Jessica Cattaneo ( 2:06.59); María Bramont-Arias (2:09.15); Azra Avdic ( 2:06.52)	Peru	8:27.16	
8	1	Andrea Garrido Urbina (2:07.67); Mariangela Cincotti (2:09.49); Andrea Santander (2:09.09); Simone Palomo (2:07.66)	Venezuela	8:33.91	
