= Peru at the 2017 World Aquatics Championships =

- Flag of Peru
- FINA code: PER
- National federation: Federación Deportiva Peruana de Natación
- Website: www.fdpn.org

in Budapest, Hungary
- Competitors: 3 in 2 sports
- Medals: Gold 0 Silver 0 Bronze 0 Total 0

World Aquatics Championships appearances
- 1973; 1975; 1978; 1982; 1986; 1991; 1994; 1998; 2001; 2003; 2005; 2007; 2009; 2011; 2013; 2015; 2017; 2019; 2022; 2023; 2024

Peru is scheduled to compete at the 2017 World Aquatics Championships in Budapest, Hungary from July 14th to July 30th.

== Open water swimming ==
Peru has entered one open water swimmer

Athlete	Event	Time	Rank
María Bramont-Arias	Women's 5 km	1:02:08.2	39
María Bramont-Arias	Women's 10 km	2:09:39.6	42

== Swimming ==
Peruvian swimmers have achieved qualifying standards in the following events (up to a maximum of 2 swimmers in each event at the A-standard entry time, and 1 at the B-standard):

Athlete	Event	Heat		Semifinal		Final	
Athlete	Event	Time	Rank	Time	Rank	Time	Rank
María Bramont-Arias	Women's 800 m freestyle	8:56.12	27	—		Did not advance	
María Bramont-Arias	Women's 1500 m freestyle	17:01.85	17	—		Did not advance	
Azra Avdic	Women's 100 m butterfly	DNS		Did not advance			
Azra Avdic	Women's 200 m butterfly	2:15.09	30	Did not advance			
McKenna DeBever	Women's 100 m freestyle	56.95	38	Did not advance			
McKenna DeBever	Women's 200 m freestyle	2:03.16	30	Did not advance			
