= 2018 South American Swimming Championships =

Swimming competition in Trujillo, Peru

XLIV South American Swimming Championships
- Host city: Trujillo, Peru
- Date: 7–11 November
- Venue: Pool Mansiche
- Nations: 13
- Events: 42

The 44th South American Swimming Championships were held from 7 to 11 November at the Pool Mansiche in Trujillo, Peru.

== Participating countries ==
- Argentina
- Aruba
- Bolivia
- Brazil
- Chile
- Colombia
- Ecuador
- Guyana
- Paraguay
- Peru
- Suriname
- Uruguay
- Venezuela

== Results ==
=== Men's events ===
| Event | Gold | | Silver | | Bronze | |
|---|---|---|---|---|---|---|
| 50 m freestyle | Ítalo Duarte (BRA) | 22.45 | Guido Buscaglia (ARG) | 22.78 | Federico Grabich (ARG) | 22.94 |
| 100 m freestyle | Breno Correia (BRA) | 49.19 | João de Lucca (BRA) | 49.51 | Benjamin Hockin (PAR) | 49.89 |
| 200 m freestyle | Breno Correia (BRA) | 1:48.24 | João de Lucca (BRA) | 1:49.12 | Federico Grabich (ARG) | 1:49.94 |
| 400 m freestyle | Giuliano Rocco (BRA) | 3:51.53 | Miguel Valente (BRA) | 3:54.08 | Andy Arteta (VEN) | 3:56.49 |
| 800 m freestyle | Miguel Valente (BRA) | 8:01.35 | Giuliano Rocco (BRA) | 8:03.27 | Joaquín Moreno (ARG) | 8:11.23 |
| 1500 m freestyle | Miguel Valente (BRA) | 15:27.17 | Giuliano Rocco (BRA) | 15:29.01 | Joaquín Moreno (ARG) | 15:34.91 |
| 50 m backstroke | Guilherme Guido (BRA) | 25.01 CR | Charles Hockin (PAR) | 25.70 | Omar Pinzón (COL) | 25.99 |
| 100 m backstroke | Guilherme Guido (BRA) | 54.06 | Omar Pinzón (COL) | 55.51 | Nathan Bighetti (BRA) | 55.64 |
| 200 m backstroke | Nathan Bighetti (BRA) | 2:00.16 | Matías López (PAR) | 2:04.23 | Charles Hockin (PAR) | 2:04.40 |
| 50 m breaststroke | Felipe Lima (BRA) | 27.12 CR | Renato Prono (PAR) | 27.44 | Jorge Murillo (COL) | 27.85 |
| 100 m breaststroke | Felipe Lima (BRA) | 59.87 CR | Jorge Murillo (COL) | 1:01.22 | Carlos Mahecha (COL) | 1:01.51 |
| 200 m breaststroke | Evandro Silva (BRA) | 2:13.19 | Carlos Mahecha (COL) | 2:14.17 | Gabriel Morelli (ARG) | 2:14.44 |
| 50 m butterfly | Benjamin Hockin (PAR) | 23.90 | Pedro Vieira (BRA) | 23.95 | Santiago Grassi (ARG) | 24.05 |
| 100 m butterfly | Pedro Vieira (BRA) | 52.53 | Santiago Grassi (ARG) | 52.80 | Roberto Strelkov (ARG) | 53.43 |
| 200 m butterfly | Jonathan Gómez (COL) | 1:57.71 CR | Kaio de Almeida (BRA) | 1:58.41 | Kauê Carvalho (BRA) | 1:58.99 |
| 200 m individual medley | Evandro Silva (BRA) | 2:00.65 | Ícaro Ludgero (BRA) | 2:01.23 | Tomas Peribonio (ECU) | 2:02.64 |
| 400 m individual medley | Tomas Peribonio (ECU) | 4:22.79 | Ícaro Ludgero (BRA) | 4:23.70 | Santiago Bergliafa (ARG) | 4:24.28 |
| 4 × 100 m freestyle relay | Brazil; João de Lucca (49.79); Giuliano Rocco (50.90); Ítalo Duarte (51.08); Breno Correia (48.18) | 3:19.95 | Argentina; Guido Buscaglia (50.05); Roberto Strelkov (50.59); Lautaro Rodríguez (50.62); Federico Grabich (49.28) | 3:20.54 | Colombia; Esnaider Reales (51.62); Omar Pinzón (52.48); Carlos Mahecha (51.85); David Arias (51.14) | 3:27.09 |
| 4 × 200 m freestyle relay | Brazil; Giuliano Rocco (1:50.58); Joao de Lucca (1:52.07); Kauê Carvalho (1:51.70); Breno Correia (1:48.62) | 7:22.97 CR | Argentina; Lautaro Rodríguez (1:53.29); Joaquín Moreno (1:55.13); Gonzalo Garay (1:53.24); Federico Grabich (1:52.30) | 7:33.96 | Colombia; Juan Morales (1:53.13); Esnaider Reales (1:54.77); Jonathan Gómez (1:53.67); David Arias (1:55.96) | 7:37.53 |
| 4 × 100 m medley relay | Brazil; Guilherme Guido (54.91); Raphael Rodrigues (1:02.13); Pedro Vieira (53.10); Breno Correia (49.40) | 3:39.54 | Argentina; Agustín Hernández (56.74); Gabriel Morelli (1:02.31); Santiago Grassi (52.76); Federico Grabich (49.68) | 3:41.49 | Colombia; Omar Pinzón (55.70); Jorge Murillo (1:01.29); Esnaider Reales (53.63); David Arias (51.51) | 3:42.13 |

=== Women's events ===
| Event | Gold | | Silver | | Bronze | |
|---|---|---|---|---|---|---|
| 50 m freestyle | Daynara de Paula (BRA) | 25.70 | Julieta Lema (ARG) | 25.82 | Karen Torrez (BOL) | 25.94 |
| 100 m freestyle | Daynara de Paula (BRA) | 56.41 | Rafaela Raurich (BRA) | 57.26 | Julieta Lema (ARG) | 57.28 |
| 200 m freestyle | Delfina Pignatiello (ARG) | 2:00.22 | Rafaela Raurich (BRA) | 2:00.50 | María Álvarez (COL) | 2:02.67 |
| 400 m freestyle | Delfina Pignatiello (ARG) | 4:11.95 | Gabrielle Roncatto (BRA) | 4:16.54 | Delfina Dini (ARG) | 4:17.76 |
| 800 m freestyle | Delfina Pignatiello (ARG) | 8:41.86 | Delfina Dini (ARG) | 8:47.60 | María Bramont-Arias (PER) | 8:49.83 |
| 1500 m freestyle | Kristel Köbrich (CHI) | 16:10.93 CR | Delfina Pignatiello (ARG) | 16:25.39 | María Bramont-Arias (PER) | 16:44.16 |
| 50 m backstroke | Andrea Berrino (ARG) | 28.98 | Mayerly Escalante (VEN) | 29.44 | Fernanda Goeij (BRA) | 29.52 |
| 100 m backstroke | Andrea Berrino (ARG) | 1:01.94 | Fernanda Goeij (BRA) | 1:03.20 | Andrea Hurtado (PER) | 1:04.25 |
| 200 m backstroke | Andrea Berrino (ARG) | 2:13.83 | Florencia Perotti (ARG) | 2:15.77 | Fernanda Goeij (BRA) | 2:16.25 |
| 50 m breaststroke | Jhennifer Conceição (BRA) | 31.29 CR | Julia Sebastián (ARG) | 31.74 | Macarena Ceballos (ARG) | 32.10 |
| 100 m breaststroke | Macarena Ceballos (ARG) | 1:08.25 CR | Julia Sebastián (ARG) | 1:08.43 | Jhennifer Conceição (BRA) | 1:09.67 |
| 200 m breaststroke | Julia Sebastián (ARG) | 2:26.54 CR | Macarena Ceballos (ARG) | 2:31.25 | Pãmela Alencar (BRA) | 2:31.74 |
| 50 m butterfly | Daynara de Paula (BRA) | 27.05 | Giovanna Diamante (BRA) | 27.21 | Macarena Ceballos (ARG) | 27.40 |
| 100 m butterfly | Giovanna Diamante (BRA) | 59.66 | Daynara de Paula (BRA) | 1:00.73 | Belén Díaz (ARG); Virginia Bardach (ARG) | 1:01:78 |
| 200 m butterfly | Virginia Bardach (ARG) | 2:10.80 | Giovanna Diamante (BRA) | 2:12.78 | Nathália Almeida (BRA) | 2:18.05 |
| 200 m individual medley | Gabrielle Roncatto (BRA) | 2:15.26 | Virginia Bardach (ARG) | 2:15.27 | Florencia Perotti (ARG) | 2:16.87 |
| 400 m individual medley | Virginia Bardach (ARG) | 4:43.82 | Gabrielle Roncatto (BRA) | 4:48.25 | Florencia Perotti (ARG) | 4:48.27 |
| 4 × 100 m freestyle relay | Brazil; Rafaela Raurich (56.83); Daynara de Paula (55.64); Graciele Herrmann (56.75); Gabrielle Roncatto (57.69) | 3:46.91 | Argentina; Julieta Lema (56.72); Andrea Berrino (56.58); Delfina Pignatiello (58.25); Macarena Ceballos (57.20) | 3:48.75 | Colombia; Valentina Becerra (59.02); Daniela Gutiérrez (58.67); Karen Durango (58.90); María Álvarez (58.57) | 3:55.16 |
| 4 × 200 m freestyle relay | Argentina; Delfina Pignatiello (2:01.72); Virginia Bardach (2:01.36); Delfina Dini (2:04.80); Andrea Berrino (2:01.95) | 8:09.83 NR | Brazil; Rafaela Raurich (2:04.26); Aline Rodrigues (2:02.73); Giovanna Diamante (2:02.02); Gabrielle Roncatto (2:00.98) | 8:09.99 | Peru; Andrea Cedrón (2:06.46); María Bramont-Arias (2:07.28); Jessica Cattaneo (2:06.58); Camila Quineche (2:10.86) | 8:31.18 |
| 4 × 100 m medley relay | Brazil; Fernanda Goeij (1:03.27); Jhennifer Conceição (1:08.04); Giovanna Diamante (59.44); Daynara de Paula (56.79) | 4:07.54 | Argentina; Andrea Berrino (1:02.30); Macarena Ceballos (1:08.77); Virginia Bardach (1:02.53); Julieta Lema (56.55) | 4:10.15 | Peru; Andrea Hurtado (1:05.46); Paula Tamashiro (1:12.67); Mariagracia Torres (1:04.79); Jessica Cattaneo (58.93) | 4:21.85 |

=== Mixed events ===
| Games | Gold | | Silver | | Bronze | |
|---|---|---|---|---|---|---|
| 4 × 100 m freestyle relay | Brazil; Breno Correia (49.22); João de Lucca (48.86); Daynara de Paula (56.64); Rafaela Raurich (56.09) | 3:30.81 CR | Argentina; Guido Buscaglia (50.36); Federico Grabich (49.23); Andrea Berrino (56.44); Julieta Lema (56.78) | 3:32.81 | Colombia; Esnaider Reales (51.78); María Álvarez (58.50); Daniela Gutiérrez (57.91); David Arias (51.44) | 3:39.63 |
| 4 × 100 m medley relay | Brazil; Guilherme Guido (54.73); Felipe Lima (59.77); Daynara de Paula (59.63); Rafaela Raurich (56.92) | 3:51.05 CR | Argentina; Andrea Berrino (1:02.32); Macarena Ceballos (1:08.50); Santiago Grassi (54.01); Federico Grabich (49.43) | 3:54.26 | Colombia; Omar Pinzón (55.68); Jorge Murillo (1:00.57); Valentina Becerra (1:01.56); Daniela Gutiérrez (57.49) | 3:55.30 |

== Medal standings ==
* Host nation (Peru)

| Rank | Nation | Gold | Silver | Bronze | Total |
|---|---|---|---|---|---|
| 1 | Brazil (BRA) | 27 | 18 | 7 | 52 |
| 2 | Argentina (ARG) | 11 | 17 | 16 | 44 |
| 3 | Colombia (COL) | 1 | 3 | 10 | 14 |
| 4 | Paraguay (PAR) | 1 | 3 | 2 | 6 |
| 5 | Ecuador (ECU) | 1 | 0 | 1 | 2 |
| 6 | Chile (CHI) | 1 | 0 | 0 | 1 |
| 7 | Venezuela (VEN) | 0 | 1 | 1 | 2 |
| 8 | Peru (PER)* | 0 | 0 | 5 | 5 |
| 9 | Bolivia (BOL) | 0 | 0 | 1 | 1 |
| Totals (9 entries) | | 42 | 42 | 43 | 127 |
