= Peru at the 2019 World Aquatics Championships =

- Flag of Peru
- World Aquatics code: PER
- National federation: Peruvian Sports Swimming Federation
- Website: fdpn.org (in Spanish)

in Gwangju, South Korea
- Competitors: 5 in 2 sports
- Medals: Gold 0 Silver 0 Bronze 0 Total 0

World Aquatics Championships appearances
- 1973; 1975; 1978; 1982; 1986; 1991; 1994; 1998; 2001; 2003; 2005; 2007; 2009; 2011; 2013; 2015; 2017; 2019; 2022; 2023; 2024; 2025

Peru competed at the 2019 World Aquatics Championships in Gwangju, South Korea from 12 to 28 July.

== Open water swimming ==
Peru qualified one female open water swimmer.

Athlete	Event	Time	Rank
María Bramont-Arias	Women's 5 km	58:09.1	10
María Bramont-Arias	Women's 10 km	1:55:33.8	26

== Swimming ==
Peru entered four swimmers.

Men

Athlete	Event	Heat		Semifinal		Final	
Athlete	Event	Time	Rank	Time	Rank	Time	Rank
Gustavo Gutiérrez	200 m butterfly	2:01.64	36	did not advance			
Gustavo Gutiérrez	400 m individual medley	4:33.87	36	—N/a		did not advance	
Christian Mayer	400 m freestyle	4:05.33	42	—N/a		did not advance	
Christian Mayer	200 m individual medley	2:09.69	44	did not advance			

Women

Athlete	Event	Heat		Semifinal		Final	
Athlete	Event	Time	Rank	Time	Rank	Time	Rank
McKenna DeBever	200 m individual medley	2:16.97	25	did not advance			
María Fé Muñoz	200 m butterfly	2:15.28	27	—N/a		did not advance	
María Fé Muñoz	400 m individual medley	4:58.62	24	—N/a		did not advance	
