= Peru at the 2024 World Aquatics Championships =

- Flag of Peru
- FINA code: PER
- National federation: Peruvian Sports Swimming Federation
- Website: fdpn.org (in Spanish)

in Doha, Qatar
- Competitors: 9 in 3 sports
- Medals: Gold 0 Silver 0 Bronze 0 Total 0

World Aquatics Championships appearances
- 1973; 1975; 1978; 1982; 1986; 1991; 1994; 1998; 2001; 2003; 2005; 2007; 2009; 2011; 2013; 2015; 2017; 2019; 2022; 2023; 2024

Peru competed at the 2024 World Aquatics Championships in Doha, Qatar from 2 to 18 February.

== Competitors ==
The following is the list of competitors in the Championships.

Sport	Men	Women	Total
Artistic swimming	0	3	3
Open water swimming	1	1	2
Swimming	2	2	4
Total	3	6	9

== Artistic swimming ==
Women

Athlete	Event	Preliminaries		Final	
Athlete	Event	Points	Rank	Points	Rank
María Ccoyllo; Camila Fernández	Duet technical routine	200.5100	27	Did not advance	
María Ccoyllo; Adriana Toulier	Duet free routine	151.1249	24	Did not advance	

== Open water swimming ==
Men

Athlete	Event	Time	Rank
Adrián Ywanaga	Men's 5 km	55:21.0	48
Adrián Ywanaga	Men's 10 km	1:53:54.6	44

Women

Athlete	Event	Time	Rank
María Bramont-Arias	Women's 5 km	59:10.8	30
María Bramont-Arias	Women's 10 km	1:58:35.2	25

== Swimming ==
Peru entered 4 swimmers.

Men

Athlete	Event	Heat		Semifinal		Final	
Athlete	Event	Time	Rank	Time	Rank	Time	Rank
Diego Balbi	100 metre butterfly	53.62	31	Did not advance			
Diego Balbi	200 metre butterfly	2:01.91	29	Did not advance			
Rafael Ponce	200 metre freestyle	1:52.75	42	Did not advance			
Rafael Ponce	400 metre freestyle	3:59.63	39	—		Did not advance	

Women

Athlete	Event	Heat		Semifinal		Final	
Athlete	Event	Time	Rank	Time	Rank	Time	Rank
McKenna DeBever	100 metre freestyle	56.93	30	Did not advance			
McKenna DeBever	200 metre individual medley	2:16.52	18	Did not advance			
Alexia Sotomayor	100 metre backstroke	1:04.41	33	Did not advance			
Alexia Sotomayor	200 metre backstroke	2:20.05	25	Did not advance			
