= Peru at the 2013 World Aquatics Championships =

- Flag of Peru
- FINA code: PER
- National federation: Federación Deportiva Peruana de Natación
- Website: www.fdpn.org

in Barcelona, Spain
- Competitors: 4 in 1 sports
- Medals: Gold 0 Silver 0 Bronze 0 Total 0

World Aquatics Championships appearances
- 1973; 1975; 1978; 1982; 1986; 1991; 1994; 1998; 2001; 2003; 2005; 2007; 2009; 2011; 2013; 2015; 2017; 2019; 2022; 2023; 2024

Peru competed at the 2013 World Aquatics Championships in Barcelona, Spain between 19 July and 4 August 2013.

== Swimming ==
Peruvian swimmers achieved qualifying standards in the following events (up to a maximum of 2 swimmers in each event at the A-standard entry time, and 1 at the B-standard):

Men

Athlete	Event	Heat		Semifinal		Final	
Athlete	Event	Time	Rank	Time	Rank	Time	Rank
Mauricio Fiol	50 m butterfly	24.32 NR	35	did not advance			
Mauricio Fiol	100 m butterfly	53.11	=25	did not advance			
Mauricio Fiol	200 m butterfly	1:58.29 NR	19	did not advance			
Sebastián Jahnsen Madico	50 m freestyle	24.54	62	did not advance			
Sebastián Jahnsen Madico	100 m freestyle	52.20	53	did not advance			

Women

Athlete	Event	Heat		Semifinal		Final	
Athlete	Event	Time	Rank	Time	Rank	Time	Rank
Andrea Cedrón	200 m freestyle	2:08.14	37	did not advance			
Andrea Cedrón	400 m freestyle	4:28.78	31	—		did not advance	
Daniela Miyahara	800 m freestyle	9:15.94	34	—		did not advance	
Daniela Miyahara	1500 m freestyle	17:56.85	23	—		did not advance	
