= Peru at the 2011 World Aquatics Championships =

- Flag of Peru
- FINA code: PER
- National federation: Federación Deportiva Peruana de Natación
- Website: www.fdpn.org

in Shanghai, China
- Competitors: 3 in 1 sports
- Medals: Gold 0 Silver 0 Bronze 0 Total 0

World Aquatics Championships appearances
- 1973; 1975; 1978; 1982; 1986; 1991; 1994; 1998; 2001; 2003; 2005; 2007; 2009; 2011; 2013; 2015; 2017; 2019; 2022; 2023; 2024

Peru competed at the 2011 World Aquatics Championships in Shanghai, China between July 16 and 31, 2011.

== Swimming ==
Peru qualified 3 swimmers.

Men

Athlete	Event	Heats		Semifinals		Final	
Athlete	Event	Time	Rank	Time	Rank	Time	Rank
Sebastián Jahnsen Madico	Men's 200m Freestyle	1:53.68	45	did not advance			
Sebastián Jahnsen Madico	Men's 400m Freestyle	4:00.93	35			did not advance	

Women

Athlete	Event	Heats		Semifinals		Final	
Athlete	Event	Time	Rank	Time	Rank	Time	Rank
Andrea Cedrón	Women's 200m Freestyle	2:08.10	40	did not advance			
Andrea Cedrón	Women's 400m Freestyle	4:25.06	33			did not advance	
Daniela Miyahara	Women's 400m Freestyle	4:23.33	31			did not advance	
Daniela Miyahara	Women's 800m Freestyle	9:02.28 NR	30			did not advance	
