= 1821 in music =

This article is about music-related events in 1821.

== Events ==
- Construction work begins on the Teatro Regio at Parma.
- José Bernardo Alcedo wins a contest, sponsored by General José de San Martín, to choose a national anthem for Peru. The anthem is "Somos libres, seámoslo siempre," with lyrics by José de la Torre Ugarte.

== Classical music ==
- Ludwig van Beethoven – Piano Sonata No. 31
- Friedrich Wilhelm Kalkbrenner – Piano Sextet Op. 58
- Friedrich Kuhlau – 9 Variations For Piano
- Felix Mendelssohn – Symphonies for Strings 1–6
- George Onslow – Cello Sonata, Op.16 No.3 (with viola part)
- Ferdinand Ries
  - 2 Piano Sonatinas, Op. 5
  - Fantasie nach Schiller's Gedicht 'Resignation', Op. 109
- Franz Schubert
  - "Gesang der Geister über den Wassern", D.714; part song for male voices and low strings; Op.posth. 167 (1858)
  - Symphony No. 7 in E major, D 729
- Louis Spohr
  - Clarinet Concerto No. 3 in F minor, WoO 19
  - Mass in C minor, Op. 54
- Jan Václav Voříšek – Symphony in D
- Carl Maria von Weber – Konzertstück in F minor, for piano and orchestra, Op. 79

== Opera ==
- Johann Kaspar Aiblinger – Rodrigo und Chimene
- Michele Carafa – Jeanne d'Arc à Orléans
- Saverio Mercadante
  - Andronico
  - Elisa e Claudio
- Giovanni Pacini – Cesare in Egitto
- Gioachino Rossini – Matilde di Shabran, premiered Feb. 24 in Rome.
- Carl Maria von Weber – Der Freischütz

== Publications ==
- Ananias Davisson – Introduction to Sacred Music, Extracted from the Kentucky Harmony and Chiefly Intended for the Benefit of Young Scholars

== Births ==
- April 27 – Henry Willis, organ builder (d. 1901)
- May 6 – Emilie Hammarskjöld, composer (d. 1854)
- May 25 – Diederich Krug, pianist and composer (d. 1880)
- June 15 – Nikolai Zaremba, musical theorist and composer (d. 1879)
- June 27 – August Conradi, organist and composer (d. 1873)
- July 18 – Pauline Viardot, singer and composer (d. 1910)
- October 4 – Fanny Stål pianist (d. 1889)
- October 8 – Friedrich Kiel, composer (d. 1885)
- October 13 – Oscar Byström, academic and composer (d. 1909)
- October 16 – Franz Doppler, flautist and composer (d. 1883)
- October 20 – Emilio Arrieta, composer (d. 1894)
- December 8 – Josif Runjanin, composer of the Croatian national anthem (d. 1878)
- December 22 – Giovanni Bottesini, composer (d. 1889)

== Deaths ==
- March 8 – Harriett Abrams, operatic soprano (b. c.1758)
- May 15 – John Wall Callcott, composer (b. 1766)
- June 25 – Antoine Bullant, bassoonist and composer (born 1750)
- August 6 – Antonio Bartolomeo Bruni, violinist, conductor and composer (born 1757)
- August 10 – Salvatore Viganò, choreographer and composer (born 1769)
- September 22 – Louise-Rosalie Lefebvre, "Madame Dugazon", entertainer (born 1755)
- October 28 – Gaspare Pacchierotti, castrato singer (born 1740)
- November 10 – Andreas Romberg, violinist and composer (born 1767)
- date unknown
  - Jules Granier, composer (born 1770)
  - Kamalakanta Bhattacharya, Bengali poet and songwriter (born 1722)
