= Swimming at the 2019 Pan American Games – Women's 400 metre freestyle =

Women's 400 metre freestyle at the 2019 Pan American Games
- Venue: Villa Deportiva Nacional, VIDENA
- Dates: August 6 (preliminaries and finals)
- Competitors: 14 from 10 nations

Medalists
Gold medal	Delfina Pignatiello	Argentina
Silver medal	Danica Ludlow	Canada
Bronze medal	Alyson Ackman	Canada

The women's 400 metre freestyle competition of the swimming events at the 2019 Pan American Games was held on 6 August 2019 at the Villa Deportiva Nacional Videna cluster.

== Records ==
Prior to this competition, the existing world and Pan American Games records were as follows:

World record	Katie Ledecky (USA)	3:56.46	Rio de Janeiro, Brazil	August 7, 2016
Pan American Games record	Emily Overholt (CAN)	4:08.42	Toronto, Canada	July 17, 2015

== Results ==
KEY:	QA	Qualified for A final	QB	Qualified for B final	GR	Games record	NR	National record	PB	Personal best	SB	Seasonal best

=== Heats ===
The first round was held on August 6.

Rank	Heat	Lane	Name	Nationality	Time	Notes
1	2	4	Delfina Pignatiello	Argentina	4:12.23	QA
2	2	5	Alyson Ackman	Canada	4:12.42	QA
3	1	4	Danica Ludlow	Canada	4:12.66	QA
4	1	6	Aline Rodrigues	Brazil	4:14.15	QA
5	1	3	Mariah Denigan	United States	4:14.49	QA
6	2	6	Allyson Macías Alba	Mexico	4:15.28	QA
7	1	5	Rebecca Mann	United States	4:15.69	QA
8	2	3	Viviane Jungblut	Brazil	4:16.79	QA
9	1	2	Samantha Soriano	Peru	4:17.92	QB
10	2	2	María Álvarez	Colombia	4:20.54	QB
11	2	1	Michelle Jativa Revelo	Ecuador	4:25.74	QB
12	1	7	Azra Avdic	Peru	4:27.59	QB
13	1	1	Giselle Gursoy	Trinidad and Tobago	4:28.63	QB
14	2	7	Sara Pastrana	Honduras	4:28.68	QB

=== Final B ===
The B final was also held on August 6.

Rank	Lane	Name	Nationality	Time	Notes
9	4	María Álvarez	Colombia	4:21.44	
10	6	Giselle Gursoy	Trinidad and Tobago	4:24.17	
11	3	Azra Avdic	Peru	4:24.99	
12	5	Michelle Jativa Revelo	Ecuador	4:26.19	
13	2	Sara Pastrana	Honduras	4:27.11	
		Samantha Soriano	Peru	DNS	

=== Final A ===
The A final was also held on August 6.

Rank	Lane	Name	Nationality	Time	Notes
1st place, gold medalist(s)	4	Delfina Pignatiello	Argentina	4:10.86	
2nd place, silver medalist(s)	3	Danica Ludlow	Canada	4:11.97	
3rd place, bronze medalist(s)	5	Alyson Ackman	Canada	4:12.05	
4	2	Mariah Denigan	United States	4:12.23	
5	6	Aline Rodrigues	Brazil	4:12.79	
6	8	Viviane Jungblut	Brazil	4:15.35	
7	7	Allyson Macías Alba	Mexico	4:15.39	
8	1	Rebecca Mann	United States	4:15.51	
