= Peru at the 2022 World Aquatics Championships =

- Flag of Peru
- FINA code: PER
- National federation: Peruvian Sports Swimming Federation
- Website: fdpn.org (in Spanish)

in Budapest, Hungary 18 June 2022 – 3 July 2022
- Competitors: 6 in 3 sports
- Medals Ranked 0th: Gold 0 Silver 0 Bronze 0 Total 0

World Aquatics Championships appearances
- 1973; 1975; 1978; 1982; 1986; 1991; 1994; 1998; 2001; 2003; 2005; 2007; 2009; 2011; 2013; 2015; 2017; 2019; 2022; 2023; 2024

Peru competed at the 2022 World Aquatics Championships in Budapest, Hungary from 18 June to 3 July.

== Athletes by discipline ==
The following is the list of number of competitors participating at the Championships per discipline.

Sport	Men	Women	Total
Artistic swimming	0	0	0
Diving	0	1	1
Open water swimming	1	1	2
Swimming	1	2	3
Water polo	0	0	0
Total	2	4	6

== Diving ==
Women

Athlete	Event	Preliminaries		Semifinals		Final	
Athlete	Event	Points	Rank	Points	Rank	Points	Rank
Ana Ricci	1 m springboard	178.05	43	—		did not advance	
Ana Ricci	3 m springboard	215.65	32	did not advance			

== Open water swimming ==
Men

Athlete	Event	Time	Rank
Joaquín Devoto	5 km	OTL	
Joaquín Devoto	10 km	2:09:41.4	53

Women

Athlete	Event	Time	Rank
María Bramont-Arias	5 km	1:01:13.9	32
María Bramont-Arias	10 km	2:10:07.6	37

== Swimming ==
Men

Athlete	Event	Heat		Semifinal		Final	
Athlete	Event	Time	Rank	Time	Rank	Time	Rank
Rafael Ponce	800 m freestyle	8:17.49	24	—		did not advance	
Rafael Ponce	1,500 m freestyle	15:54.72	19	—		did not advance	

Women

Athlete	Event	Heat		Semifinal		Final	
Athlete	Event	Time	Rank	Time	Rank	Time	Rank
Rafaela Fernandini	50 m freestyle	26.31	37	did not advance			
Rafaela Fernandini	100 m freestyle	57.24	=29	did not advance			
Alexia Sotomayor	50 m backstroke	29.72	24	did not advance			
Alexia Sotomayor	200 m backstroke	2:16.65	17	did not advance			
