= Oath of Allegiance to the Flag of Peru =

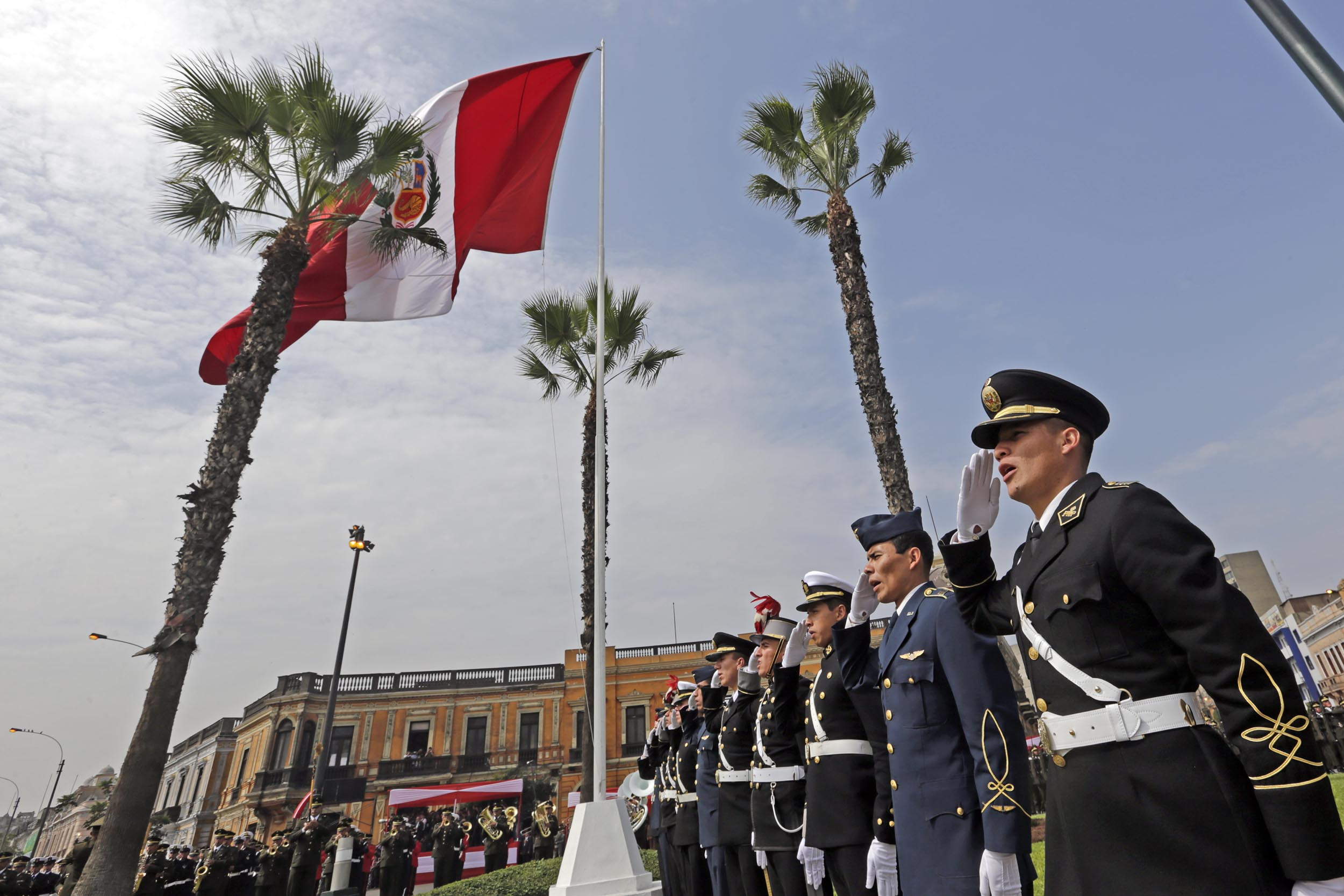
Members of the three branches of the Peruvian Armed Forces and the National Police of Peru performing the oath of allegiance to the Peruvian flag in Plaza Bolognesi during celebrations for Flag Day in 2013.

The Oath of Allegiance to the Flag of Peru is a military ceremony celebrated annually on 7 June (Flag Day) by the Peruvian Armed Forces.

== The Oath ==
The text of the oath is as follows:

¿Juráis a Dios y prometéis a la Patria seguir constantemente a vuestra bandera, defenderla hasta perder la vida y no abandonar a vuestros superiores?

In English:

Do you swear to God and promise to the Homeland to always follow your flag, defend it until death and not abandon your superiors?

to which all present respond: "Sí, juro" (Yes, I swear). After the renewal of the oath, the National Anthem of Peru is played.

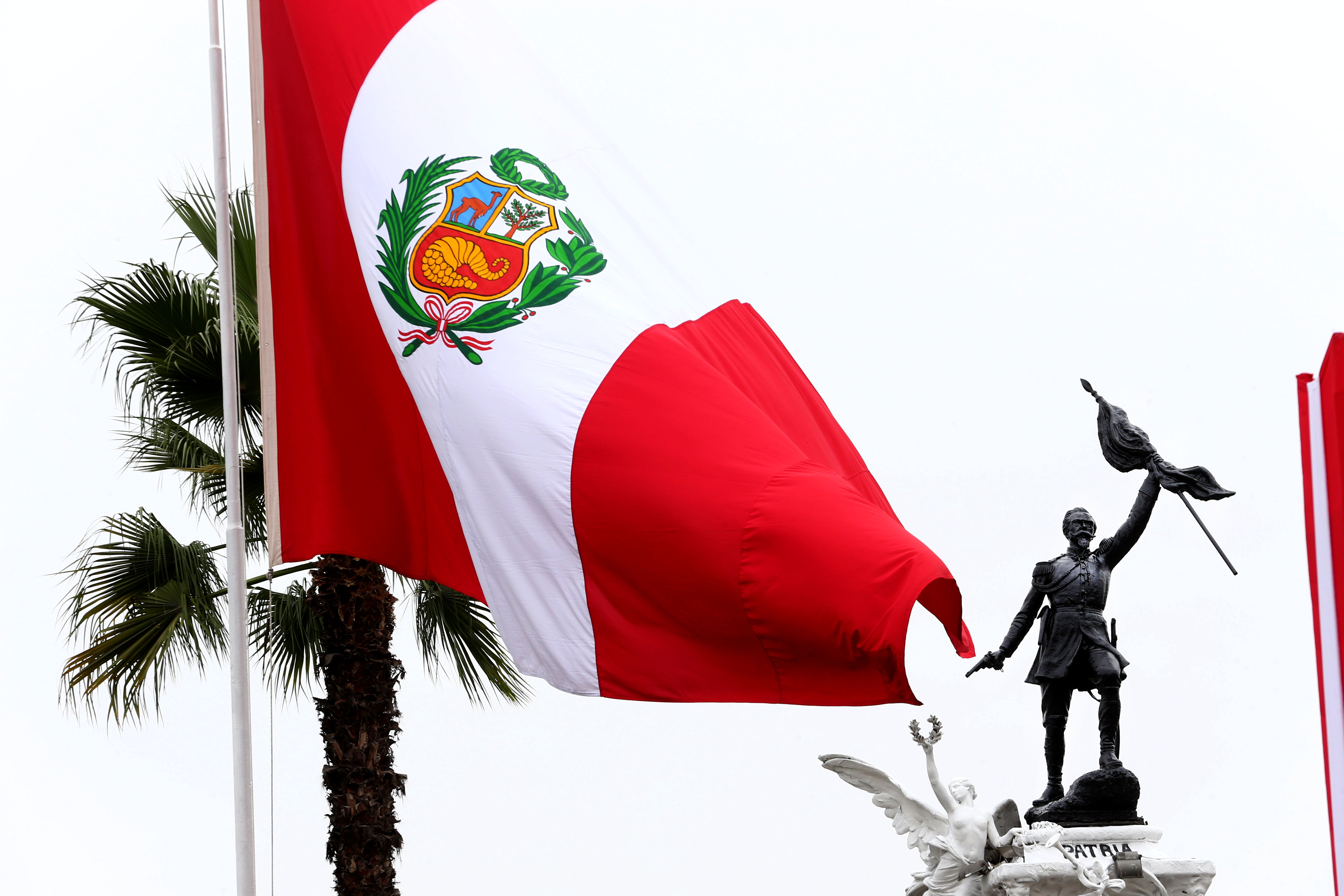
The Monument to Francisco Bolognesi in the Plaza Bolognesi, in Lima, where Flag Day is celebrated annually on 7 June.

The main ceremony takes place in the Plaza Bolognesi of Lima. Despite this, the swearing of the oath is celebrated in various other parts of Lima and other cities of the country, both by members of the Armed Forces and by civil authorities and public institutions.

== Legislation ==
By the Supreme Decree of 8 November 1905 of the first José Pardo government, it was established that conscripts (citizens recruited annually into the Army) needed to perform the oath of allegiance to the flag in a public and solemn ceremony.

By the Supreme Decree of 23 July 1923 (during Augusto B. Leguía's term) it was established that 7 June would be the selected date to swear the oath of allegiance to the flag in commemoration of the Battle of Arica, and that the ceremony in Lima should be performed in front of the Monument of Francisco Bolognesi in the plaza that also bears his name (inaugurated in 1905).

The swearing of the oath is mentioned in the National Anthem of Peru, in which states "renovemos el gran juramento, que rendimos ... al Dios de Jacob" ("Let us renew the great oath, that we rendered ... to the God of Jacob").
