= Danica Ludlow =

Canadian swimmer (born 1996)

Personal information
- National team: Canada
- Born: 30 August 1996 (age 29) Sydney, New South Wales, Australia
- Height: 175 cm (5 ft 9 in)

Sport
- Sport: Swimming
- Strokes: Medley
Medal record
Women's swimming
Representing Canada
Pan American Games
Silver medal – second place	2019 Lima	400 m freestyle
Silver medal – second place	2019 Lima	4 × 200 m freestyle relay

Danica Ludlow (born 30 August 1996) is a Canadian competitive swimmer who specializes in the medley events.

Ludlow was born in Sydney, Australia but moved to Canada when she was 11.

== Career ==
In 2019, Ludlow won a silver medal at the 2019 Pan American Games in Lima, Peru in the 400 metres individual freestyle race along with the 4 × 200 m freestyle relay.
