= Alyson Ackman =

Canadian swimmer (born 1993)

Personal information
- Full name: Alyson Patricia Ackman
- Nickname: Aly
- Born: 6 February 1993 (age 33) Montreal, Quebec, Canada
- Height: 163 cm (5 ft 4 in)
- Weight: 60 kg (132 lb)

Sport
- Sport: Swimming
- Club: Pointe-Claire Swim Club
Medal record
Swimming
Representing Canada
Pan Pacific Championships
Bronze medal – third place	2014 Gold Coast	4×200 m freestyle
Pan American Games
Gold medal – first place	2015 Toronto	4×100 m freestyle
Silver medal – second place	2019 Lima	4×200 m freestyle
Silver medal – second place	2019 Lima	4×100 m medley
Bronze medal – third place	2015 Toronto	4×200 m freestyle
Bronze medal – third place	2019 Lima	400 m freestyle
Bronze medal – third place	2019 Lima	4×100 m freestyle
Commonwealth Games
Silver medal – second place	2014 Glasgow	4×200 m freestyle
Bronze medal – third place	2014 Glasgow	4×100 m freestyle

Alyson Patricia "Aly" Ackman now Synnack (born 6 February 1993) is a professional swimmer competing on the Canadian National Swim Team since 2013. In 2016, she retired from her professional swimming career to pursue a career as a personal trainer and swimming coach. Before her retirement, she won a silver medal in the 4 x 200 Freestyle relay and a bronze in the 4 x 100 Freestyle relay at the 2014 Commonwealth Games in Glasgow.

== Early life ==
Ackman attended John Rennie High School, but swam for the Pointe Claire Swim Club. She earned the highest honor, Victor Davis Award from PCSC in 2011. She was named team MVP in 2010 and 2012.

== Professional career ==
At the 2014 FINA Pan Pacific Championships Ackman came 12th in the 200m freestyle, 14th in the 100m freestyle, 18th in the 400m freestyle, 4th in the 4×100 freestyle, and won bronze in the 4 × 200 m freestyle relay.

In 2015 Ackman competed at the Pan American Games and the FINA World Championship (Kazan, Russia). During the Pan American Games, she earned a gold medal in 4 X 100 Freestyle and 4 X 200 Freestyle events.

Coming out of retirement in January 2019, Ackman competed in several international meets, including the 2018 Canadian Swimming Trials and Swimming Nationals and the 2019 Canadian Swimming Trials, where she qualified for the 2019 Pan American Games in Lima, Peru.

In August 2019, Ackman competed in the 2019 Pan American Games in Lima, Peru where she opened the games with a pair of bronze medals on the first day.

== Personal life ==
Ackman was born in Montreal to Mike and Lisa Ackman. She has one brother, Matthew, and one sister, Samantha.

== See also ==
- List of Commonwealth Games medallists in swimming (women)
