= Aline Rodrigues =

Brazilian swimmer (born 1995)

Personal information
- Full name: Aline da Silva Rodrigues
- Nationality: Brazil
- Born: 7 April 1995 (age 31) Rio de Janeiro, Rio de Janeiro, Brazil
- Height: 1.68 m (5 ft 6 in)
- Weight: 57 kg (126 lb)

Sport
- Sport: Swimming
- Strokes: Freestyle
- Club: Minas Tênis Clube
Medal record
Women's swimming
Representing Brazil
Pan American Games
Bronze medal – third place	2019 Lima	4×200 m freestyle
South American Games
Gold medal – first place	2022 Asunción	4x100 m freestyle
Gold medal – first place	2022 Asunción	4x200 m freestyle
South American Championships
Silver medal – second place	2018 Trujillo	4×200 m freestyle

Aline da Silva Rodrigues (born 7 April 1995, in Rio de Janeiro) is a Brazilian swimmer.

== International career ==
On 3 September 2014, participating in the José Finkel Trophy (short course competition) in Guaratinguetá, she broke the South American record in the 4x200-metre freestyle with a time of 7:58.54, along with Larissa Oliveira, Gabrielle Roncatto and Daniele de Jesus.

In September 2016, at the José Finkel Trophy (short course competition), she broke the South American record in the 4×200-metre freestyle relay, with a time of 7:52.71, along with Joanna Maranhão, Manuella Lyrio and Larissa Oliveira.

At the 2018 South American Swimming Championships, she won a silver medal in the 4×200-metre freestyle relay.

At the 2019 Pan American Games held in Lima, Peru, she won a bronze medal in the Women's 4 × 200 metre freestyle relay, along with Larissa Oliveira, Manuella Lyrio and Gabrielle Roncatto. She also finished 5th in the Women's 400 metre freestyle.

She competed in the 2020 Summer Olympics, where she finished 10th in the Women's 4 × 200 metre freestyle relay, along with Larissa Oliveira, Nathalia Almeida and Gabrielle Roncatto.

She was at the 2022 World Aquatics Championships held in Budapest, Hungary. In the Brazilian 4x200m freestyle relay, formed by Maria Paula Heitmann, Giovanna Diamante, Rodrigues and Stephanie Balduccini, she finished in 6th place with a time of 7:58.38. This was the best placement of Brazil in this race in Worlds at all times.

At the 2022 FINA World Swimming Championships (25 m), in Melbourne, Australia, in the Women's 4 × 200 metre freestyle relay, she broke the South American record with a time of 7:48.42, along with Giovanna Diamante, Gabrielle Roncatto and Stephanie Balduccini. Brazil's relay finished 7th in the final. She also finished 9th in the Women's 4 × 100 metre freestyle relay.

At the 2024 World Aquatics Championships, in the 4 × 200 metre freestyle relay, the team composed of Rodrigues, Maria Fernanda Costa, Stephanie Balduccini and Gabrielle Roncatto obtained a historic result, reaching 4th place, Brazil's best placement in this event at the World Championships, destroying the South American record with the mark of 7:52.71. The quartet formed by Rodrigues, Costa, Balduccini and Ana Carolina Vieira also finished 6th in the 4x100m freestyle, equaling Brazil's best result in world championships in this event.
