= National Anthem of Peru =

Himno Nacional del Perú
English: National Anthem of Peru
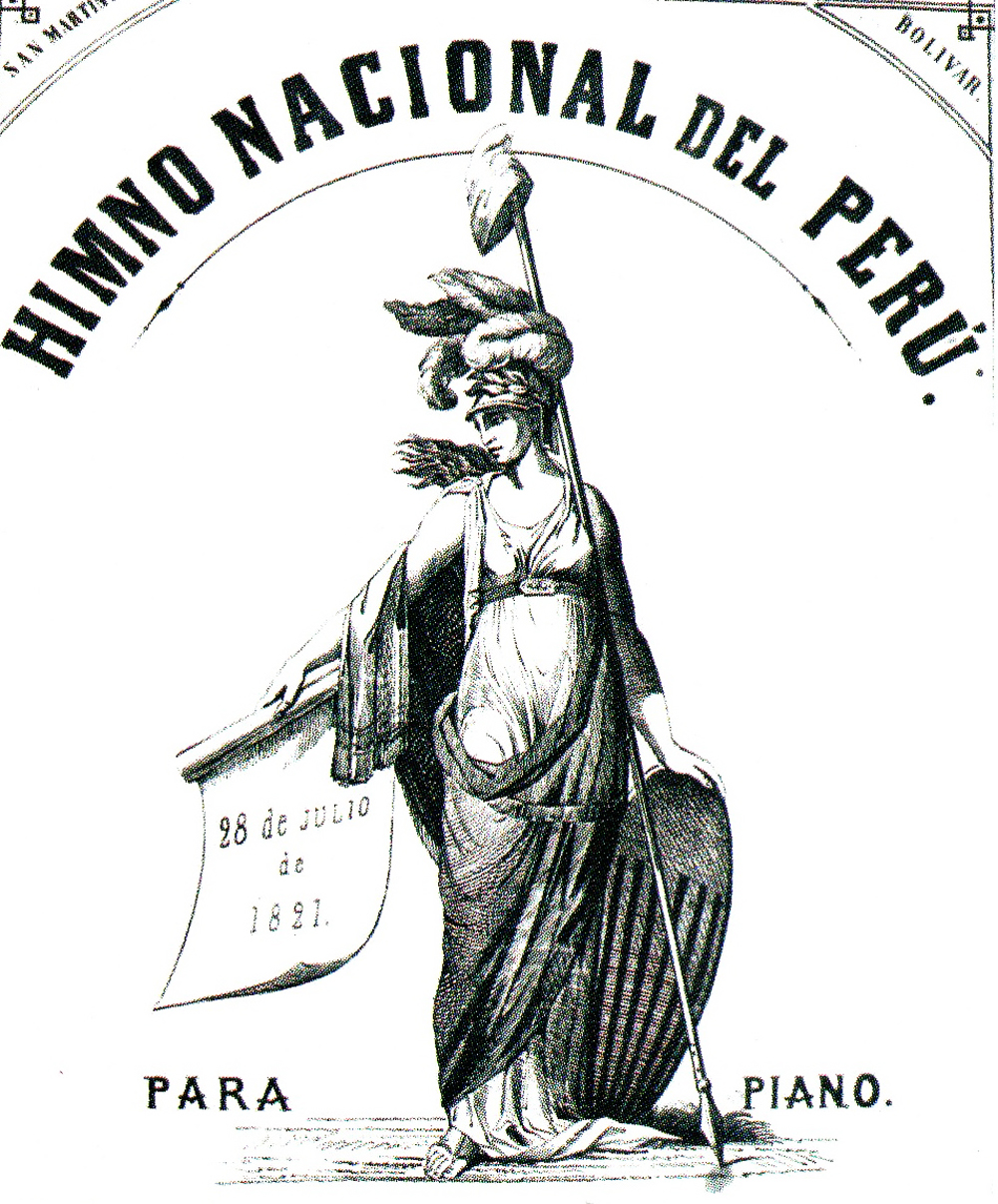
- Cover of the sheet music for piano of the National Anthem with the arrangements of Carlos Juan Eksund (1863). This was the first version that included the apocryphal verse that remains the most popular until today.
- National anthem of Peru
- Also known as: "Marcha Nacional del Perú" (English: 'National March of Peru') "¡Somos libres! ¡seámoslo siempre, seámoslo siempre!" (English: 'We are free! May we always be so, may we always be so!')
- Lyrics: José de la Torre Ugarte, 1821
- Music: José Bernardo Alcedo, 1821
- Adopted: 1821

Audio sample
- Instrumental version (chorus and one verse): file; help

The "National Anthem of Peru", (Note: Spanish: Himno Nacional del Perú; Quechua: Piruwpa llaqta takin; Aymara: Piruw yarawi nasyunal) also known as the "National March of Peru" (Note: Spanish: Marcha Nacional del Perú) and "We are free! May we always be so, may we always be so!", (Note: Spanish: ¡Somos libres! ¡seámoslo siempre, seámoslo siempre!) was adopted in 1821. The music was composed by José Bernardo Alcedo, and the lyrics were written by José de la Torre Ugarte.

== History ==
=== Public contest of 1821 ===
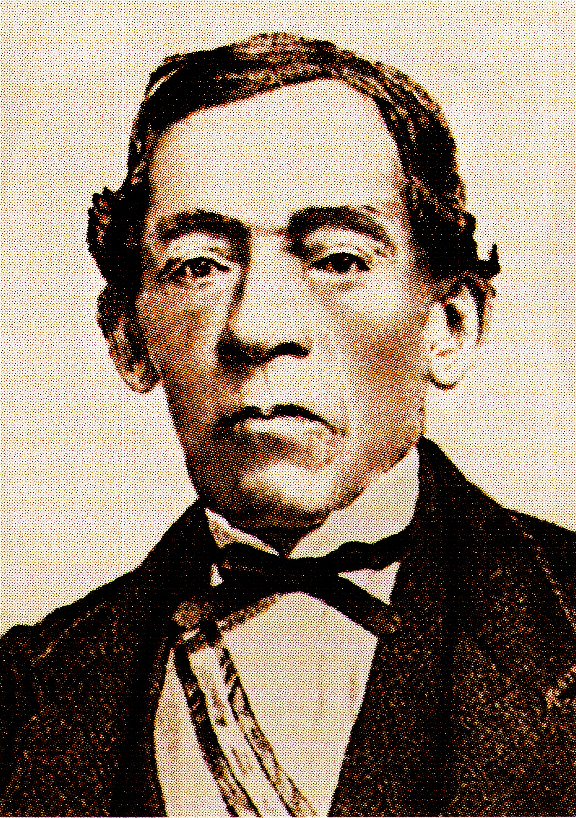
José Bernardo Alcedo, composer

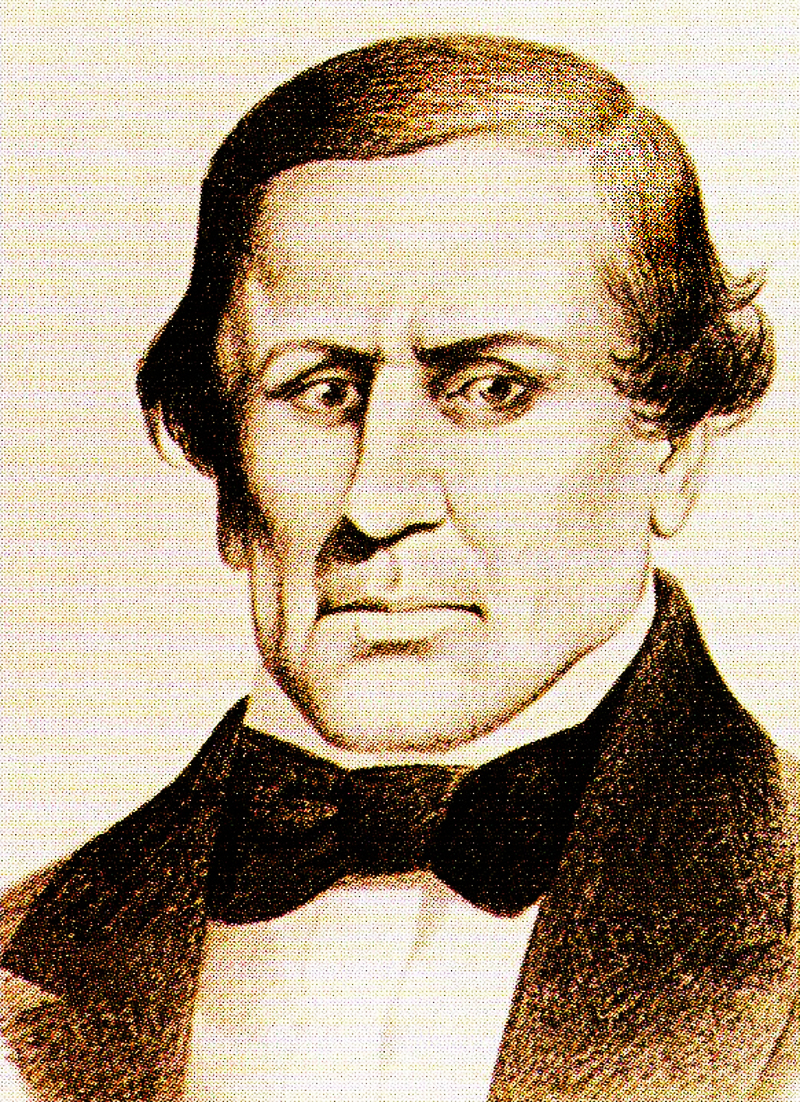
José de la Torre Ugarte, author of the lyrics

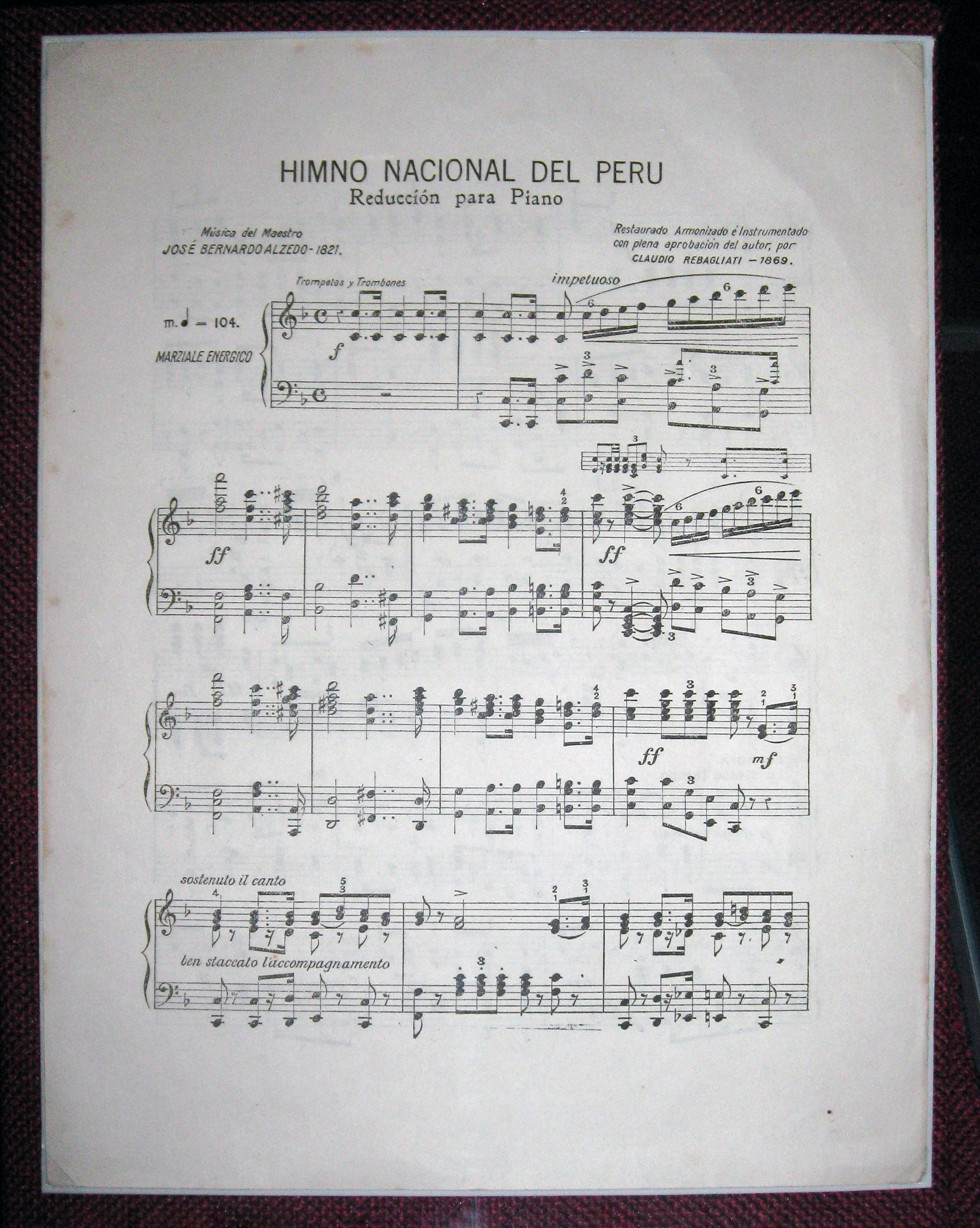
Sheet music of the Himno Nacional del Perú

After Peru declared its independence, the general José de San Martín began a public contest to select the National March, which was published on 7 August 1821 in the ministerial gazette. The contest called upon professors of poetry, composers and general aficionados, to send their signed productions to the Ministry of the State before 18 September, the day in which a designated commission would decide which of them would be adopted as the "National March".

Seven compositions were entered, and on a prefixed day, they were reviewed and played in the following order:

- The band musician major from the "Numancia" Battalion
- That of master José Bernardo Alcedo
- That of master Guapaya
- That of master Tena
- That of master Filomeno
- That of Father Aguilar, master of the Augustine Chapel
- Another entry of master José Bernardo Alcedo, at the behest of a brother of the Convent of Saint Domingo

After hearing the last production of José Bernardo Alcedo, General José de San Martín stood up and exclaimed, "Without a doubt, this is the National Anthem of Peru." The following day, a signed decree confirmed this opinion expressed in the midst of great enthusiasm and jubilation. The anthem was first performed publicly in the night of 23 September 1821 in the Theater of Lima, in the presence of San Martín and the supporters of independence, who on that day were once more gathered in the capital. The voice of Rosa Merino, was the first to sing the lyrics to the anthem, from the original verses from the poet José de la Torre Ugarte from Ica. Upon hearing the music and the lyrics of the National Anthem for the first time, the audience responded with a standing ovation directed at Alcedo, who conducted the orchestra.

=== Arrangements and modifications ===
Diverse publications of the anthem had subtle modifications in the lyrics and the music, which was then restored by Claudio Rebagliati in 1869 at the behest of Alcedo. In 1874 there was a solicitation which asked for a revision to the lyrics of the anthem, in light of the various versions in circulation, as well as the minor mistakes which were found. This initiative was approved, but did not prosper, due to the rejection that it generated in the public opinion at its core and the recognition that it had already become a time honored tradition.

In 1901 there was another intent to reform the anthem, this time approved by the administration of Eduardo López de Romaña, who approved of the music of the restored anthem by Rebagliati. He declared a new contest to select new lyrics as he considered the original lyrics as aggressive towards Spain, which at the time had amiable relations with Peru. The winner of the contest was the poet José Santos Chocano, whose verses along with the same chorus went on to be sung in public schools and in public venues. The lyrics also had references to the great South American liberator hero Simón Bolívar as well as José de San Martín, the nation's founder, in the first verse.

It was not long until public opinion once again asked for the original lyrics to be restored. Public pressure was so great that the Peruvian Congress was obligated in 1913 during the administration of President Guillermo Billinghurst to declare untouchable the lyrics as well as the chorus of the National Anthem.

In 1954, at the behest of Raúl Porras Barrenechea, Chabuca Granda composed a new replacement for the first verse in the anthem, but this was never implemented:

Spanish original

Gloria enhiesta en milenios de historia
fue moldeando el sentir nacional
y fue el grito de Túpac Amaru
el que alerta, el que exige
y el que impele, hacia la libertad.
Y el criollo y el indio se estrechan
anhelantes de un único ideal
y la entrega de su alma y su sangre
dio el blanco y los rojos
del emblema que al mundo anunció
que soberano se yergue el Perú.
Para gloria de Dios.

English translation

Glory erected in millennia of history
molded the national sentiment
and it was the yell of Túpac Amaru
which alerts, which demands
and which impels, towards liberty.
And the creole and the Indian embrace
yearning for a single ideal
and the sacrifice of their soul and blood
that gave the white and reds
of the emblem that announced to the world
that Peru rises sovereign.
For the glory of God.

The last attempts to change the anthem were first during the administration of General Juan Velasco Alvarado who attempted to change the second and third stanzas. In similar form to previous attempts, it was imposed during official ceremonies and in schools and during the administration of General President Francisco Morales Bermudez the last stanza was sung instead of the first. But these attempts also had no success and the original anthem was once again sung when his successor Fernando Belaunde Terry became President in 1980.

=== Officialization of the sung verse ===
The Constitutional Tribunal determined in June 2005 that the first stanza in the anthem (Largo tiempo...) was not written by José de la Torre Ugarte and that was just a popular folklore, but its insertion into the history of the anthem expressed the will of the people represented in Law N° 1801 passed by Congress which declares it an intangible subject. The Constitutional Tribunal also verified that the fifth stanza had been excluded in the original anthem and considering author's rights and the integrity of the piece, it was ordered that the fifth stanza be restored into the official anthem as the sixth stanza with a total of seven stanzas making up the official national anthem.

Starting September 2009, Verse 7 of the National Anthem, as sanctioned by the Peruvian Government, has become the official sung verse of the anthem instead of and replacing the first, with the verse starting to be included in schools from 2010 onward. The Peruvian Armed Forces and National Police of Peru also adopted the new official verse, with a new music video of the anthem made for this purpose at the same month as the adoption of the now official seventh verse of the national anthem.

The "stand at attention" posture is done when it is played for civilians while military, police and fire personnel must render hand salutes when out of formation. Some people do the "hand on heart" posture, following US practice. In ceremonies and concerts, the following shout is done when the anthem's performance is over:

- Leader: ¡Viva el Perú!/Kawsachun Piruw!/Ayaya Piruw!/Kimoshiretantsi Peru! (Long live Peru!)
- All: ¡Viva!/Kawsachun!/Ayaya!/Kimoshiretantsi! (Long live!)

The chant Long Live Peru! is also done in sporting events, concerts, anniversaries and other occasions after the playing of the national anthem.

== Lyrics ==
=== Official lyrics ===
The official lyrics since 2009 consist of the chorus and seventh (originally sixth) verse of the full lyrics.

Spanish original

Coro:
¡Somos libres!
¡seámoslo siempre, seámoslo siempre!
y antes niegue sus luces
sus luces, ¡sus luces el Sol!
Que faltemos al voto solemne
que la patria al Eterno elevó,
𝄆 Que faltemos al voto solemne
que la patria al Eterno elevó. 𝄇

VII (el antiguo sexto verso)
En su cima los Andes sostengan
la bandera o pendón bicolor,
que a los siglos anuncie el esfuerzo
que ser libres, que ser libres
que ser libres por siempre nos dio.
A su sombra vivamos tranquilos,
y al nacer por sus cumbres el Sol,
renovemos el gran juramento
que rendimos, que rendimos,
𝄆 que rendimos al Dios de Jacob, 𝄇
al Dios de Jacob...

Coro

English translation

Chorus:
We are free!
May we always be so, may we always be so!
And may the Sun renounce its light,
its light, its light,
Before we break the solemn vow
that the Fatherland lifted up to the Eternal,
𝄆 Before we break the solemn vow
that the Fatherland lifted up to the Eternal. 𝄇

VII (former sixth verse)
On its summits may the Andes sustain
the two-color flag or standard,
may it announce to the centuries the effort
that being free, that being free,
that being free gave us forever.
Under its shadow may we live calmly
and, at birth of the sun in its summits,
may we all renew the great oath
that we rendered, that we rendered,
𝄆 that we rendered to the God of Jacob, 𝄇
the God of Jacob...

Chorus

=== Full lyrics ===
Spanish original

Coro:
¡Somos libres!
¡seámoslo siempre, seámoslo siempre!
y antes niegue sus luces
sus luces, ¡sus luces el Sol!
Que faltemos al voto solemne
que la patria al Eterno elevó,
𝄆 Que faltemos al voto solemne
que la patria al Eterno elevó. 𝄇

I (no en la letra original)
Largo tiempo el peruano oprimido
la ominosa cadena arrastró
condenado a una cruel servidumbre
largo tiempo, largo tiempo,
largo tiempo en silencio gimió.
Mas apenas el grito sagrado
¡Libertad! en sus costas se oyó
la indolencia de esclavo sacude
la humillada, la humillada,
𝄆 la humillada cerviz levantó, 𝄇
cerviz levantó...

Coro

II
Y al estruendo de roncas cadenas
que escucharon tres siglos de horror,
de los libres al grito sagrado
que oyó atónito, que oyó atónito,
que oyó atónito el mundo, cesó.
Por doquier San Martín inflamado,
libertad, libertad, pronunció,
y meciendo su base los Andes
la anunciaron, la anunciaron,
𝄆 la anunciaron, también, a una voz, 𝄇
también, a una voz...

Coro

III
Con su influjo los pueblos despiertan
y cual rayo corrió la opinión;
desde el istmo a las tierras del fuego,
desde el fuego, desde el fuego,
desde el fuego a la helada región.
Todos juran romper el enlace
que Natura a ambos mundos negó,
y quebrar ese cetro que España
reclinaba, reclinaba,
𝄆 reclinaba orgullosa en los dos, 𝄇
orgullosa en los dos...

Coro

IV
Lima cumple su voto solemne,
y, severa, su enojo mostró,
al tirano impotente lanzando,
que intentaba, que intentaba,
que intentaba alargar su opresión.
A su esfuerzo saltaron los grillos (Note: Sometimes written hierros ("irons"), especially in older publications.)
y los surcos que en sí reparó,
le atizaron el odio y venganza
que heredara, que heredara,
𝄆 que heredara de su Inca y Señor, 𝄇
de su Inca y Señor...

Coro

V
Compatriotas, no más verla esclava.
Si humillada tres siglos gimió,
para siempre jurémosla libre,
manteniendo, manteniendo,
manteniendo su propio esplendor.
Nuestros brazos, hasta hoy desarmados
estén siempre cebando el cañón,
que algún día las playas de Iberia
sentirán, sentirán,
𝄆 sentirán de su estruendo el terror, 𝄇
de su estruendo el terror...

Coro

VI (el antiguo quinto verso)
Excitemos los celos de España
pues presiente con mengua y furor
que en concurso de grandes naciones
nuestra patria, nuestra patria,
nuestra patria entrará en parangón.
En la lista que de éstas se forme
llenaremos primero el reglón
que el tirano ambicioso Iberino,
que la América, que la América,
𝄆 que la América toda asoló, 𝄇
toda asoló...

Coro

VII (el antiguo sexto y actual verso oficial cantado)
En su cima los Andes sostengan
la bandera o pendón bicolor,
que a los siglos anuncie el esfuerzo
que ser libres, que ser libres
que ser libres por siempre nos dio.
A su sombra vivamos tranquilos,
y al nacer por sus cumbres el Sol,
renovemos el gran juramento
que rendimos, que rendimos,
𝄆 que rendimos al Dios de Jacob, 𝄇
al Dios de Jacob...

Coro

English translation

Chorus:
We are free!
May we always be so, may we always be so!
And may the Sun renounce its light,
its light, its light,
Before we break the solemn vow
that the Fatherland lifted up to the Eternal,
𝄆 Before we break the solemn vow
that the Fatherland lifted up to the Eternal. 𝄇

I (not in the original lyrics)
For a long time, the oppressed Peruvian
dragged the ominous chain.
condemned to a cruel servitude,
for a long time, for a long time,
for a long time he quietly moaned.
But as soon as the sacred cry,
Freedom! in its coasts was heard
the slaves' indolence shakes
the humiliated, the humiliated,
𝄆 the humiliated neck raised up, 𝄇
neck raised up...

Chorus

II
Now the roar of rough chains
that we had heard for three centuries of horror
from the free, at the sacred cry
that heard, that heard,
that the world heard astonished, ceased.
Everywhere the inflamed San Martín
"Freedom", "Freedom" he pronounced;
and the Andes, rocking their base,
announced it, announced it,
𝄆 announced it as well, in unison, 𝄇
as well, in unison...

Chorus

III
With its influx the peoples woke up,
and like lighting ran the opinion;
from the Isthmus to the Tierra del Fuego,
from the Fuego, from the Fuego,
from the Fuego to the icy region.
Everyone vowed to break the link
that Nature denied to both worlds,
and break the sceptre that Spain
had reclined, had reclined,
𝄆 had reclined, proudly, on both, 𝄇
proudly, on both...

Chorus

IV
Lima fulfilled this solemn vow,
and, severe, its anger showed
by throwing out the powerless tyrant,
who had been trying, who had been trying,
who had been trying to extend his oppression.
On its endeavor the shackles cracked,
and the furrows that it had repaired in itself
stirred up its hatred and vengeance,
inherited, inherited,
𝄆 inherited from its Inca and Lord, 𝄇
from its Inca and Lord...

Chorus

V
Countrymen, may we see it a slave no more.
If for three centuries it moaned, humiliated,
forever may we swear it'd be free,
maintaining, maintaining,
maintaining its own splendor.
Our arms, until today unarmed,
be they always readying the cannon,
that some day the beaches of Iberia
will feel, will feel,
𝄆 will feel the horror of its roar, 𝄇
the horror of its roar...

Chorus

VI (former fifth verse)
May we arouse the jealousy of Spain
since it has a premonition, with want and furor,
that in a contest of great nations
our Fatherland, our Fatherland,
our Fatherland will enter in comparison.
On the list formed by these
we shall fill the line first,
ahead of the ambitious Iberian tyrant,
who devastated, who devastated,
𝄆 who devastated all of America, 𝄇
devastated all of America...

Chorus

VII (former sixth and present official sung verse)
On its summits may the Andes sustain
the two-color flag or standard,
may it announce to the centuries the effort
that being free, that being free,
that being free gave us forever.
Under its shadow may we live calmly
and, at birth of the sun in its summits,
may we all renew the great oath
that we rendered, that we rendered,
𝄆 that we rendered to the God of Jacob, 𝄇
the God of Jacob...

Chorus
