= Peru at the 2015 World Aquatics Championships =

- Flag of Peru
- FINA code: PER
- National federation: Federación Deportiva Peruana de Natación
- Website: www.fdpn.org

in Kazan, Russia
- Competitors: 6 in 2 sports
- Medals: Gold 0 Silver 0 Bronze 0 Total 0

World Aquatics Championships appearances
- 1973; 1975; 1978; 1982; 1986; 1991; 1994; 1998; 2001; 2003; 2005; 2007; 2009; 2011; 2013; 2015; 2017; 2019; 2022; 2023; 2024

Peru competed at the 2015 World Aquatics Championships in Kazan, Russia from 24 July to 9 August 2015.

== Open water swimming ==
Peru has qualified one swimmer to compete in the open water marathon.

Athlete	Event	Time	Rank
Gustavo Gutiérrez	Men's 5 km	55:46.6	31
Gustavo Gutiérrez	Men's 10 km	1:56:23.1	51

== Swimming ==
Peruvian swimmers have achieved qualifying standards in the following events (up to a maximum of 2 swimmers in each event at the A-standard entry time, and 1 at the B-standard):

Men

Athlete	Event	Heat		Semifinal		Final	
Athlete	Event	Time	Rank	Time	Rank	Time	Rank
Mauricio Fiol	100 m butterfly	DNS		Did not advance			
Nicholas Magana	100 m freestyle	50.99	55	Did not advance			

Women

Athlete	Event	Heat		Semifinal		Final	
Athlete	Event	Time	Rank	Time	Rank	Time	Rank
Andrea Cedrón	200 m freestyle	2:04.07	48	Did not advance			
Andrea Cedrón	400 m freestyle	4:18.96	32	—		Did not advance	
Daniela Miyahara	800 m freestyle	9:00.30	33	—		Did not advance	
