= José Bernardo Alzedo =

Peruvian composer

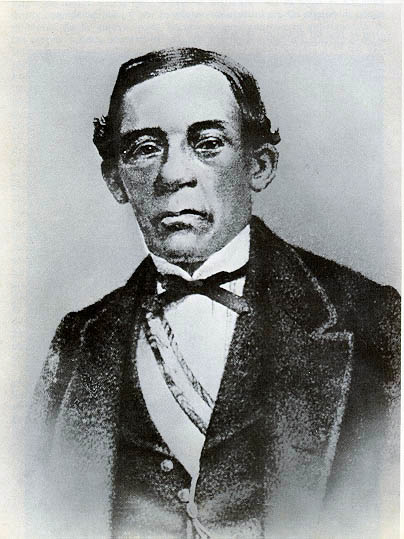
José Bernardo Alzedo

José Bernardo Alzedo (August 20, 1788 – December 28, 1878) was a Peruvian composer.

Alzedo was born in Lima, Peru. He studied music at the Convento de San Agustín, and composed Misa en Re Mayor (Mass [Hymn] in D Major) when he was 18 years old. In 1806, he became a Dominican friar; his behaviour was considered lax by the fellow members of that religious order.

Alzedo was the winner of an 1821 contest sponsored by General José de San Martín to choose a national anthem for Peru, being his winning opus called Somos libres, seámoslo siempre ("We are free; so shall we ever be"), with lyrics by José de la Torre Ugarte.

In 1822, Alzedo went to Chile as a soldier in a military band. In Santiago, he left the military and dedicated himself to music. He joined the choir of the Cathedral of Santiago in 1833. In 1846, he became kapellmeister. He resided in Chile for 42 years, returning to Peru in 1864. He became director of the Peruvian military band, and president of the Philharmonic. He spent the last years of his life in Peru, and wrote the book Filosofía Elemental de la Música (Elementary Philosophy of Music) in 1869, in which he discourses upon Quechuan music. He composed folk songs, numerous religious works, and also military music.

== Notable works ==
- Somos libres, seámoslo siempre (the National Anthem of Peru);
- Himno al 2 de mayo ("Anthem to the Second of May");
- Miserere (1872);
- Misa en Re mayor ("Mass [Hymn] in D major");
- Misa en Mi bemol ("Mass in E flat");
- Misa en Fa mayor ("Mass in F major");
- Canción para la Batalla de Ayacucho ("Song for the Battle of Ayacucho");
- Pasión para el Domingo de Ramos ("Passion [Hymn] for Palm Sunday");
- Pasión para el Viernes Santo ("Passion for Good Friday");
- La Araucana ("The Araucanian [Song]") — a military overture for orchestras;
- Folk songs such as La Chicha ("The Chicha), La Cora (The Weed), and La Pola.
