= Giuliano Rocco =

Brazilian swimmer (born 1993)

Personal information
- Full name: Giuliano Carer Rocco
- Nationality: Brazil
- Born: 18 April 1993 (age 33) São Paulo, São Paulo, Brazil
- Height: 1.84 m (6 ft 0 in)
- Weight: 76 kg (168 lb)

Sport
- Sport: Swimming
- Strokes: Freestyle
Medal record
Men's swimming
Representing Brazil
Pan American Games
Silver medal – second place	2011 Guadalajara	4x200 m freestyle

Giuliano Carer Rocco (born 18 April 1993 in São Paulo) is a Brazilian competitive swimmer.

In 2011 Pan American Games, won the silver medal in the 4×200-metre freestyle, by participating in the qualifying race. Also ranked 11th in the 400-metre freestyle.
