= José de la Torre Ugarte y Alarcón =

Peruvian lawyer and poet (1786–1831)

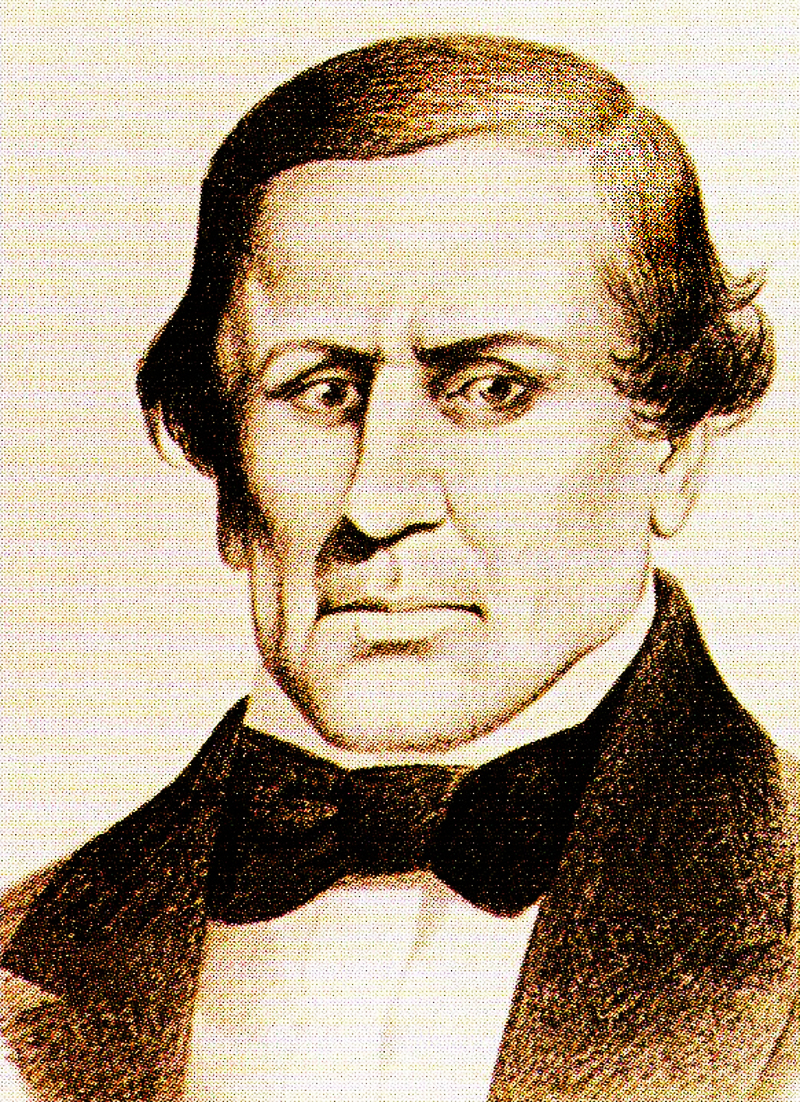
- Born: 19 March 1786; Ica, Peru
- Died: 1 September 1831 (aged 45); Trujillo
- Education: National University of San Marcos
- Occupations: Lawyer, poet
- Spouse(s): Manuela Valdivieso y Riso de la Prada (1812); Juana Manrique Vidal (1826)
- Children: 4
- Writing career
- Notable work: National Anthem of Peru lyrics

José de la Torre Ugarte y Alarcón (Note: His full baptismal name, recorded in the parish register of San Jerónimo de Ica on 22 February 1786, was José Gabino de la Torre-Ugarte y Alarcón-Manrique.) (19 March 1786 – 1 September 1831) was a Peruvian lawyer, poet, and independence figure, best known for writing the lyrics of the National Anthem of Peru.

== Biography ==
He was the son of José Estanislao de la Torre Ugarte, a Spaniard who had served as Administrator General of Lotteries in the Viceroyalty of New Granada before settling in Ica, and Mercedes Alarcón Manrique, a native of that city. His father died in 1789, when Torre Ugarte was approximately four years old. After completing his school studies at a Jesuit institution that would later become the renowned Colegio San Luis Gonzaga, he enrolled at the National University of San Marcos, where he held the chair of Arts between 1809 and 1812, though his final qualification to practice law would remain pending for over a decade.

Torre Ugarte was summoned by the Cabildo of Lima to decide on the independence of Peru, signing the Act of Independence on 15 July 1821. In 1821 he served as senior officer of the Ministry of War and as adjunct secretary to José de San Martín during the Protectorate. During the government of José de la Riva Agüero (1823), he travelled to Trujillo and served as secretary of the Senate. The ensuing power struggles placed him in a difficult position and he was condemned to death, but Colonel Antonio Gutiérrez de la Fuente, who had been commissioned to carry out the sentence, spared his life. He then sought and obtained authorization from the University of San Marcos to sit his pending law examination, which he passed before the Superior Court of Trujillo on 14 May 1825. He subsequently served as war auditor (1827–1829) and, by appointment of Agustín Gamarra, as member of the Superior Court of La Libertad (1830). Elected as a deputy, Torre Ugarte died before he could take up the position. His death certificate, preserved in the parish records of the Sagrario of Trujillo, records his death on 1 September 1831, identifying him as a member of the Superior Court of Justice, aged forty-five.

In 1812, in San Jerónimo de Ica, Torre Ugarte married Manuela Valdivieso y Riso, with whom he had three children: José, Manuela, and María Antonia. On 14 October 1826 he married Juana Manrique Vidal in Lima, with whom he had one son, Pedro.

Torre Ugarte was the author of the lyrics of the National Anthem of Peru, whose music was written by José Bernardo Alcedo; the two had previously collaborated on other works together. Their submission was personally chosen by José de San Martín as Peru's national anthem, with its official premiere taking place on 24 September 1821 at the Teatro Principal in Lima.

He also wrote the lyrics of the patriotic song La Chicha, also set to music by Alcedo, which was already being sung in Lima when San Martín proclaimed independence on 28 July 1821. His remains were transferred to the Panteón de los Próceres in Lima on 28 July 1929, alongside those of Alcedo.

== Legacy ==
In 1913, the Peruvian Congress passed Ley N.º 1801, which formally declared the lyrics and music of the National Anthem official and untouchable, explicitly crediting Torre Ugarte as the author of the lyrics. The bill was passed by the Senate on 5 August 1911, approved by the Chamber of Deputies on 25 October 1912, and promulgated by President Guillermo Billinghurst on 26 February 1913. The law also nullified a 1901 decree that had approved replacement lyrics by poet José Santos Chocano, which had failed to gain popular acceptance. In 2005, the Constitutional Tribunal ruled to restore the fifth original strophe authored by Torre Ugarte, which had been omitted from official versions.

== Family tree ==
The following ancestry is documented in a genealogical study by Alberto Rosas Siles.

Ancestry of José de la Torre Ugarte y Alarcón

Salvador de la Torre y Ugarte
Joseph Estanislao de la Torre-Ugarte y García-Guerrero
María Antonia García-Guerrero y de los Ríos
José de la Torre Ugarte y Alarcón
Juan José de Alarcón Manrique y Cabezudo
Mercedes Alarcón Manrique (Note: Rosas Siles records her as "María de los Remedios Manrique y Nestares." All other biographical sources consistently name her as Mercedes Alarcón Manrique.)
Antonia Nestares
