= Julieta Lema =

Argentine footballer

Personal information
- Date of birth: 29 November 2000 (age 25)
- Position: Forward

Senior career*
Years	Team	Apps	(Gls)
2021–2022	ASJ Soyaux	3	(0)
2022–2023	Clermont	15	(0)
2023–2024	Estudiantes	?	(?)
2024–2025	Newell's Old Boys	?	(?)
2025–2026	León	9	(0)
- * Club domestic league appearances and goals as of 9 February 2026

Julieta Lema (born 29 September 2000) is an Argentine footballer who plays as a striker for Liga MX Femenil side Club León.
