= Delfina Pignatiello =

Argentine swimmer (born 2000)

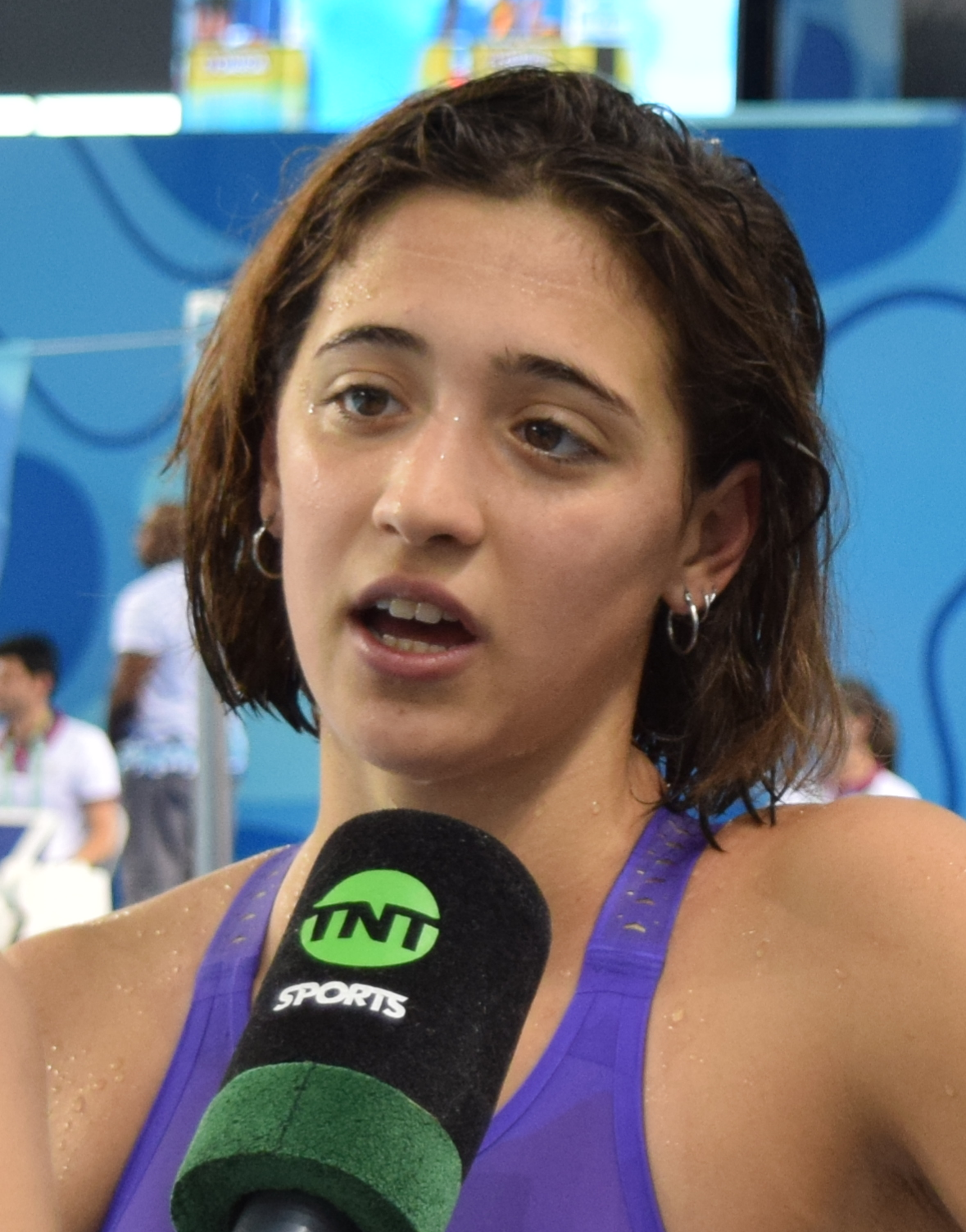
- Pignatiello in 2018

Personal information
- National team: Argentina
- Born: April 19, 2000 (age 26) San Isidro, Argentina

Sport
- Sport: Swimming
- Strokes: Freestyle
Medal record
Women's swimming
Representing Argentina
Pan American Games
Gold medal – first place	2019 Lima	400 m freestyle
Gold medal – first place	2019 Lima	800 m freestyle
Gold medal – first place	2019 Lima	1500 m freestyle
Youth Olympic Games
Silver medal – second place	2018 Buenos Aires	400 m freestyle
Silver medal – second place	2018 Buenos Aires	800 m freestyle

Delfina Pignatiello (born 19 April 2000) is an Argentine former swimmer. She participated in the 2017 FINA World Junior Swimming Championships, and represented Argentina at the 2020 Summer Olympics.

== Career ==
She began swimming as a baby, taught by her mother, a swimming coach. She started competing at the age of 12.

Delfina participated in two junior World Championships (2015, 2017) and also in a senior short course World Championship (2016). She made an Argentine record in 800 metres at the 2016 FINA World Swimming Championships (25m), where she came in 6th place.

She participated in the 2017 FINA World Junior Swimming Championships held in Indianapolis, USA, where she won two events: the 800 and 1500 metres freestyle. She also won the silver medal in the same competition in the 400 metres.

Delfina won two silver medals at the 2018 Summer Youth Olympics in the 400 and 800 metres freestyle.

In 2019, she won three gold medals at the Pan American Games in the 400, 800, and 1500 metres freestyle.

Awards
Preceded by Juan Martín del Potro	Olimpia de Oro; 2017	Succeeded by Agustín Canapino
