= Joaquín Vargas =

Peruvian swimmer (born 2002)

Personal information
- Full name: Joaquín Daniel Vargas Gallo
- Nationality: Peru
- Born: 19 February 2002 (age 24) Piura, Peru
- Height: 187 cm (6 ft 2 in)
- Weight: 80 kg (176 lb)

Sport
- Sport: Swimming
- Strokes: Freestyle
- College team: University of Tennessee
Medal record
Representing Peru
Men's swimming
Event	1st	2nd	3rd
South American Championships	0	0	2
Bolivarian Games	0	0	2
Total	0	0	4
South American Championships
Bronze medal – third place	2021 Buenos Aires	400 m freestyle
Bronze medal – third place	2024 Cali	200 m freestyle
Bolivarian Games
Bronze medal – third place	2022 Valledupar	200 m freestyle
Bronze medal – third place	2022 Valledupar	4×100 m mixed freestyle

Joaquín Vargas (born 19 February 2002) is a Peruvian swimmer. He won a bronze medal in the men's 400 metre freestyle at the 2021 South American Swimming Championships. He competed in the 2020 Summer Olympics.
