= Sebastián Jahnsen Madico =

Peruvian swimmer

Personal information
- Born: September 8, 1990 (age 35) Lima, Peru

Sport
- Sport: Swimming

Sebastián Jahnsen Madico (born 8 September 1990) is a Peruvian swimmer. He was born in Lima. He competed at the 2012 Summer Olympics in the men's 200 metre freestyle, finishing 34th fastest in the heats, failing to qualify for the semifinals. He also competed in the 50 metre and 100 metre events at the 2013 World Aquatics Championships.
