= Jessica Cattaneo =

Peruvian swimmer (born 1996)

Personal information
- Full name: Jessica Cattaneo Paulista
- Nationality: Peruvian
- Born: 8 December 1996 (age 29)

Sport
- Sport: Swimming
- Strokes: Freestyle
Medal record
Women's swimming
Representing Peru
South American Games
Bronze medal – third place	2018 Cochabamba	4×200 m freestyle
Bronze medal – third place	2018 Cochabamba	4×100 m medley
Bolivarian Games
Gold medal – first place	2017 Santa Marta	200 m freestyle
Gold medal – first place	2017 Santa Marta	4×200 m freestyle
Bronze medal – third place	2017 Santa Marta	100 m freestyle
Bronze medal – third place	2017 Santa Marta	4×100 m freestyle
Bronze medal – third place	2017 Santa Marta	4×100 m medley
South American Championships
Silver medal – second place	2016 Asunción	4×200 m freestyle

Jessica Cattaneo (born 8 December 1996) is a Peruvian swimmer. She competed in the women's 100 metre freestyle event at the 2018 FINA World Swimming Championships (25 m), in Hangzhou, China.
