= McKenna DeBever =

Peruvian swimmer (born 1996)

Personal information
- Full name: McKenna Victoria De Bever Elliot
- Nationality: American, Peruvian
- Born: 5 June 1996 (age 30) Los Angeles, California, U.S.

Sport
- Country: Peru
- Sport: Swimming
- Strokes: Backstroke; Freestyle; Individual medley
- College team: Texas A&M University (2017–2019); Auburn University (2014–2016)
Medal record
Representing Peru
Women's swimming
Event	1st	2nd	3rd
South American Games	0	0	4
South American Championships	1	0	1
Bolivarian Games	4	2	2
Total	5	2	7
South American Games
Bronze medal – third place	2018 Cochabamba	100 m backstroke
Bronze medal – third place	2018 Cochabamba	200 m medley
Bronze medal – third place	2018 Cochabamba	4×100 m medley
Bronze medal – third place	2022 Asunción	4×100 m freestyle
South American Championships
Gold medal – first place	2021 Buenos Aires	200 m medley
Bronze medal – third place	2021 Buenos Aires	100 m backstroke
Bolivarian Games
Gold medal – first place	2017 Santa Marta	200 m medley
Gold medal – first place	2017 Santa Marta	4×200 m freestyle
Gold medal – first place	2022 Valledupar	100 m backstroke
Gold medal – first place	2022 Valledupar	200 m medley
Silver medal – second place	2022 Valledupar	4×100 m freestyle
Silver medal – second place	2022 Valledupar	4×200 m freestyle
Bronze medal – third place	2017 Santa Marta	4×100 m freestyle
Bronze medal – third place	2022 Valledupar	4×100 m mixed freestyle

McKenna Victoria De Bever Elliot (born 5 June 1996), known as McKenna DeBever, is a swimmer. Born in the United States, she represents Peru internationally. She competed in the women's 200 metre freestyle event at the 2017 World Aquatics Championships. She represented Peru at the 2019 World Aquatics Championships held in Gwangju, South Korea. She competed in the women's 200 metre individual medley where she did not advance to compete in the semi-finals.

Born in Los Angeles, she was raised in Denver and competed at the collegiate level for Texas A&M.
