= Azra Avdic =

Peruvian swimmer (born 1998)

Personal information
- Born: 19 September 1998 (age 27)

Sport
- Sport: Swimming
Medal record
Women's swimming
Representing Peru
South American Games
Silver medal – second place	2018 Cochabamba	200 m butterfly
Silver medal – second place	2018 Cochabamba	400 m medley
Bronze medal – third place	2018 Cochabamba	4×200 m freestyle
Bronze medal – third place	2018 Cochabamba	4×100 m medley

Azra Avdic (born 19 September 1998) is a Peruvian swimmer. She competed in the women's 200 metre butterfly event at the 2017 World Aquatics Championships.
