= María Bramont-Arias =

Peruvian swimmer (born 1999)

Personal information
- Born: 13 August 1999 (age 26)

Sport
- Sport: Swimming
Medal record
Women's swimming
Representing Peru
South American Games
Bronze medal – third place	2018 Cochabamba	4×200 m freestyle

María Alejandra Bramont-Arias García (born 13 August 1999) is a Peruvian swimmer. She competed in the women's 1500 metre freestyle event at the 2017 World Aquatics Championships.

In 2019, she won the women's 5 km events at the South American Beach Games. Four months later she competed in the women's 5 km and women's 10 km events at the 2019 World Aquatics Championships held in Gwangju, South Korea. In the 5 km event she finished in 10th place and in the 10 km event she finished in 26th place. In 2019, she also competed in the women's marathon 10 kilometres at the 2019 Pan American Games held in Lima, Peru. She finished in 7th place.

== Major results ==
=== Individual ===
==== Long course ====
Year	Competition	Venue	Position	Event	Notes
Representing Peru
2017	World Championships	Budapest, Hungary	27th (h)	800 m freestyle	8:56.12
2017	World Championships	Budapest, Hungary	17th (h)	1500 m freestyle	17:01.85
2018	South American Games	Cochabamba, Bolivia	6th	800 m freestyle	9:31.94
2018	South American Championships	Trujillo, Peru	3rd	800 m freestyle	8:49.83
2018	South American Championships	Trujillo, Peru	3rd	1500 m freestyle	16:44.16
2019	Pan American Games	Lima, Peru	10th	800 m freestyle	9:04.18
2019	Pan American Games	Lima, Peru	10th	1500 m freestyle	17:13.47

==== Open water swimming ====
Year	Competition	Venue	Position	Event	Notes
Representing Peru
2019	South American Beach Games	Rosario, Argentina	1st	5 km	53:05.6
2019	World Championships	Gwangju, South Korea	10th	5 km	58:09.1
2019	World Championships	Gwangju, South Korea	26th	10 km	1:55:33.8
2019	Pan American Games	Lima, Peru	7th	10 km	2:02:56.9
2022	World Championships	Budapest, Hungary	32nd	5 km	1:01:13.9
2022	World Championships	Budapest, Hungary	37th	10 km	2:10:07.6

=== Relay ===
==== Long course ====
Year	Competition	Venue	Team	Position	Event	Notes
Representing Peru
2018	South American Games	Cochabamba, Bolivia	Cattaneo / Avdic / Hurtado / Bramont-Arias	3rd	4 × 200 m freestyle	8:36.29
2018	South American Championships	Trujillo, Peru	Cattaneo / Bramont-Arias / Cedrón / Hurtado	4th	4 × 100 m freestyle	3:57.03
2018	South American Championships	Trujillo, Peru	Cedrón / Bramont-Arias / Cattaneo / Quineche	3rd	4 × 200 m freestyle	8:31.18
2019	Pan American Games	Lima, Peru	Bello / Cattaneo / Bramont-Arias / Avdic	7th	4 × 200 m freestyle	8:27.16
