= Flag of Peru =

Republic of Peru
- See list of nicknames: Bandera nacional ('National Flag'); El pendón bicolor ('The Bicolor Banner'); La enseña nacional ('The national ensign')
- Use: Civil flag and ensign
- Proportion: 2:3
- Adopted: 25 February 1825; 201 years ago; 31 March 1950; 76 years ago (current version)
- Design: Vertical triband of red (hoist-side and fly-side) and white.
- Designed by: José de San Martín; José Bernardo de Tagle; Simón Bolívar
- Pabellón nacional (State flag)
- Use: State flag, state and naval ensign
- Proportion: 2:3
- Adopted: 31 March 1950; 76 years ago
- Design: A vertical triband of red (hoist-side and fly-side) and white with the National Coat of Arms centered on the white band.
- Bandera de guerra (War flag)
- Use: War flag
- Proportion: 2:3
- Adopted: 4 July 1901; 125 years ago
- Design: A vertical triband of red (hoist-side and fly-side) and white.
- Bara de proa (Naval jack)
- Use: Naval jack
- Proportion: 1:1
- Design: A red square with the white square in the center bearing the Coat of Arms (Escudo de Armas) in the center.

The national flag of Peru, officially named the Bandera Nacional (Spanish for "National Flag") and often referred to as The Bicolour (la Bicolor), is a vertical triband with red outer bands and a single white middle band, as defined by Article 49 of the Constitution of the Republic of Peru. The current flag was adopted by the Congress of Peru on 25 February 1825, and modified in 1950. Depending on its use, it may be defaced with different emblems, and has different names. Flag Day in Peru is celebrated on 7 June, the anniversary of the Battle of Arica.

== Design and symbolism ==
=== Meaning of the colors ===
Red represents the blood that was spilled by the fallen freedom fighters that fought for the independence of the country. White represents purity and peace. However, the colours are also linked to the flamingo, or parihuana, a red and white type of flamingo that General San Martín dreamed about during the revolution.

=== Color approximations ===
The current colors of the Peruvian flag were taken of the design of San Martín and Torre Tagle. The reasons that red and white were chosen are unknown.

Official tones determined by Peruvian laws do not exist. However, there are some particular initiatives in approximated equivalents in multiple color models, some in tones close to crimson.

Peru	Red	White
RGB	217-16-35	255-255-255
Hexadecimal	#D91023	#FFFFFF
CMYK	0, 93, 84, 15	0, 0, 0, 0
Pantone	485 C	White

At official level, the governmental communications have used diverse shades of red.

Construction sheet.

== Variants ==
=== Civil flag ===
The civil flag or ensign (bandera nacional) is used by citizens. It has no additions to the common form. It was changed several times. Before 1950, it looked like the current national flag and was used as both the civil and the state flag, when General Manuel A. Odría removed the coat of arms from the flag and created the state and war flags. The Civil flag lacks coat of arms.

=== State flag ===
The state flag (pabellón nacional), used by state institutions, is marked with the National shield (Escudo Nacional). It is used during ceremonies in which the National Flag is hoisted in the presence of spectators (as opposed to a static, permanent flag). A form of this flag, the national standard (estandarte nacional) is used indoors by official and private institutions. It is used for the Government Palace, the United Nations, and in similar formal capacities.

=== War flag ===
The war flag (bandera de guerra), similar to the state flag, is marked with the Coat of Arms (Escudo de Armas). It is flown by the Peruvian Armed Forces and National Police of Peru and is typically inscribed with the service, name and number of the unit flying it.

=== Naval jack ===
The naval jack (bandera de proa) is not based on the triband. It is a square flag, consisting of a white square with the coat of arms (Escudo de Armas) on a red field. It is used on the Peruvian Navy warships, usually with the ensign of the highest-ranking officer on board above it.

== History ==
=== Proposed flag of 1820 ===
Flag hoisted by Admiral Miller in October 1820 with the Sun of May.

During the Viceroyalty of Peru, the colonial-era Spanish flag flew over Peru. In 1820, during the struggle for independence, British-born General William Miller hoisted in Tacna the first flag that represented the emerging country. Though the original flag itself is now lost, it was described as navy blue with a golden sun in the center representing Inti.

=== Flag of 1820 ===
First republican flag, created by General José de San Martín.

The first flag of the Republic of Peru was created by General José de San Martín, and officially decreed on 21 October 1820. It is diagonally quartered, with white upper and lower fields, and the others red. The flag was defaced with an oval-shaped laurel crown in the center, surrounding a sun rising behind mountains by the sea. The symbolism of the flag's colors is uncertain, but according to Peruvian author Abraham Valdelomar, San Martín, having arrived on the coast of southern Pisco, was inspired by the colors of parihuanas, red-and-white flamingos. Historians of the early Peruvian Republic, such as Leguía y Martínez and Pareja Paz Soldán, give a different explanation, suggesting that San Martín took the red from the flag of Chile and the white from the flag of Argentina, recognizing the provenance of the men of the liberation army. Historian Jorge Fernández Stoll thinks in 1820 San Martin was in favor of a constitutional monarchy, and he chose to use monarchical symbols and colors: Castile used the red and white colors for many years, the old flag of the viceroyalty the cross of Burgundy was red and white and the flag's diagonal lines mimicked the cross shape, the red color was the royal symbol of the mascaipacha of Inca kings and of the ensign of the Spanish king at that time. The flag proved difficult to adopt due to its complex construction; without standardized measurements in place at the time, a triangular flag proved difficult to build.

=== Flag of March 1822 ===
Second design, by Torre Tagle.

In March 1822, José Bernardo de Tagle, Marquis of Torre Tagle and Supreme Delegate of the Republic, who replaced San Martín provisionally when the latter traveled to Guayaquil, decreed a new design for the flag. This consisted of a horizontal triband, with a white band between two red ones, and a golden Inti at the center, similar to the flag of Argentina. This modification was justified, according to Torre Tagle, by the inconvenience in the construction of the previous version, among other issues.

A problem came up on the battlefields: the resemblance with the Spanish flag, especially from far away, made the distinction between the armies difficult, which led to a new change to the flag.

=== Flag of May 1822 ===
Third design.

On 31 May 1822, Torre Tagle changed the flag's design again. The new version was a vertical triband, with red outer bands and a white middle band, with a golden sun representing Inti at the center.

=== Flag of 1825 ===
Fourth flag, created in 1825.

On 25 February 1825, during Simón Bolívar's administration, the Constituent Congress changed the design of the flag by promulgating the law of national symbols. The fundamental change was the image of the sun for the brand new coat of arms, designed by José Gregorio Paredes and Francisco Javier Cortés.

In this way, the flag was definitely constituted by two vertical bands of red at the ends and white at the center, with the coat of arms at the center of the middle band.

=== Flags of the Peru-Bolivian Confederation era, 1836–1839 ===
Flag of the Peru–Bolivian Confederation, 1836–1839.

Flag of the Republic of South Peru, 1836–1839.

From 1836 to 1839, Peru was temporarily dissolved into the Republics of South Peru and North Peru, which joined Bolivia to form the Peru–Bolivian Confederation.

The South was formed first, thus adopting a new flag: a red vertical band on the left, with a golden sun and four small stars above (representing Arequipa, Ayacucho, Cuzco and Puno, the four groups of the republic), and the right side divided into an upper green band and a lower white one. The North kept the currency and all of the dissolved Peru, including its flag.

The flag of the Peru-Bolivian Confederation showed the coats of arms of Bolivia, South and North Peru, from left to right and slanted at different angles, on a red field, adorned by a laurel crown. Another version of the flag of the confederacy is offered by Flags of the World.

After the dissolution of the Confederation, the old Republic of Peru was restored to its 1836 composition, as were its national symbols.

=== Flag of 1884 ===
Fifth flag, created in 1884.

After the War of the Pacific, the coat of arms in the flag was slightly altered to represent the territory lost after the Treaty of Ancón.

=== Flag of 1950 ===
In 1950, President Manuel A. Odría modified the national flag to its current form by removing the coat of arms from the civil flag since it was used de facto, being easier to make. The national ensign and war flag were created for exclusive uses, each with a variant of the coat of arms, which was also changed slightly. These remain as the official flags today.

=== State and war flag swap ===
In 2025, the state and war flag were swapped.

== Marcha de Banderas ==
The Marcha de Banderas (lit. 'March of Flags') is a military march sung during the flag raising. It was created in 1897 by SM Jose Sabas Libornio Ibarra, who said that like President Nicolás de Piérola, he disagreed with the indiscriminate interpretation of the National Anthem at all official events that were derived from civic events. In December of that year was officially recognized to be executed in any official act.

Arriba, arriba, arriba el Perú
y su enseña gloriosa inmortal,
llevad en alto siempre
la bandera nacional.

Tal la llevaron con gloria y honor,
héroes peruanos de invencible ardor.
Arriba, arriba siempre la bandera nacional.

Es la bandera del Perú,
de blanco y rojo color,
cual llamarada de amor,
que en Ayacucho y en Junín
victoriosa amaneció con el
sol de la Libertad

Todo peruano ha de sentir,
vibrar en su corazon
amor al patrio pendón,
y bajo sus pliegues luchar,
y si fuera menester
por sus lauros y honor morir.

Long live, long live, long live Peru
and its glorious immortal ensign,
always carry aloft
the national flag.

They carried it thusly, with glory and honor,
Peruvian heroes with invincible ardor.
Going up, always up, the national flag.

This is the flag of Peru,
of white and red in color,
as a flame of love,
which in Ayacucho and Junín
it dawned victorious with the
Sun of Liberty

Every Peruvian shall feel
in his heart vibrating,
the love for the national flag
and fight under its folds,
and if ever needed
for its laurels and honor, die.

In all occasions today, the song is sung in its entirety, but during the presidency of Alan García, only the first three were sung.

== See also ==
- List of flags of Peru
- Coat of arms of Peru
- National Anthem of Peru
- Great Military Parade (Peru)
- Flag of Canada
- Flag of Austria, similar design with horizontal stripes
