= List of flag bearers for Ecuador at the Olympics =

Ecuador at the Olympics
- IOC code: ECU
- NOC: Ecuadorian National Olympic Committee
- Website: www.coe.org.ec (in Spanish)
- Medals: Gold 4 Silver 4 Bronze 2 Total 10

Summer appearances
- 1924; 1928–1964; 1968; 1972; 1976; 1980; 1984; 1988; 1992; 1996; 2000; 2004; 2008; 2012; 2016; 2020; 2024; 2028

Winter appearances
- 2018; 2022; 2026

This is a list of flag bearers who have represented Ecuador at the Olympics.

Flag bearers carry the national flag of their country at the opening ceremony of the Olympic Games.

#	Event year	Season	Flag bearer	Sport	Ref.
1	1924	Summer	Alberto Jurado	Athletics	
2	1968	Summer	Fernando González	Swimming	
3	1972	Summer	Abdalá Bucaram Ortiz	Athletics (did not compete)	
4	1976	Summer	Nelson Suárez	Diving	
5	1980	Summer	Nancy Vallecilla	Athletics	
6	1984	Summer	Héctor Hurtado	Weightlifting	
7	1988	Summer	Liliana Chalá	Athletics	
8	1992	Summer	María Cangá	Judo	
9	1996	Summer	Felipe Delgado	Swimming	
10	2000	Summer	Martha Tenorio	Athletics	
11	2004	Summer	Alexandra Escobar	Weightlifting	
12	2008	Summer	Alexandra Escobar	Weightlifting	
13	2012	Summer	César de Cesare	Canoeing	
14	2016	Summer	Estefania García	Judo	
15	2018	Winter	Klaus Jungbluth	Cross-country skiing	
16	2020	Summer	Alexandra Escobar	Weightlifting	
16	2020	Summer	Julio Castillo	Boxing	
17	2022	Winter	Sarah Escobar	Alpine skiing	
18	2024	Summer	Neisi Dájomes	Weightlifting	
18	2024	Summer	Julio Mendoza Loor	Equestrian	

== See also ==
- Ecuador at the Olympics
