= Ecuador at the 1968 Summer Olympics =

- IOC code: ECU
- NOC: Ecuadorian National Olympic Committee

in Mexico City
- Competitors: 15 (14 men and 1 women) in 6 sports
- Flag bearer: Fernando González
- Medals: Gold 0 Silver 0 Bronze 0 Total 0

Summer Olympics appearances (overview)
- 1924; 1928–1964; 1968; 1972; 1976; 1980; 1984; 1988; 1992; 1996; 2000; 2004; 2008; 2012; 2016; 2020; 2024

Ecuador at the 1968 Summer Olympics in Mexico City, Mexico was the nation's first appearance under the auspices of the Ecuadorian National Olympic Committee following a 44-year hiatus from the 1924 Summer Olympics. A national team of fifteen athletes (fourteen men and one woman) competed in twenty-one events in six sports.

== Athletics ==
- Gustavo Gutierrez

== Boxing ==
- Rafael Anchundia
- Samuel Valencia

== Cycling ==
Four cyclists represented Ecuador in 1968.

Individual road race

- Noé Medina
- Victor Morales
- Arnulfo Pozo
- Hipólito Pozo

Team time trial

- Arnulfo Pozo
- Hipólito Pozo
- Noé Medina
- Victor Morales

== Gymnastics ==
- Sergio Luna
- Eduardo Najera
- Pedro Rendón

== Swimming ==
- Fernando González
- Eduardo Orejuela
- Tamara Orejuela

== Wrestling ==
- César Solari
- Marco Terán

== Tennis ==
Demonstration sport

- Ana María Icaza
- María Elena Guzmán
- Francisca Guzmán
- Miguel Olvera
