= Pozo =

Pozo may refer to:

== People ==
- Alejandro Pozo (born 1999), Spanish footballer
- Ángel del Pozo (1934–2025), Spanish actor
- Angelica Pozo, American clay artist
- Arnulfo Pozo (born 1945), Ecuadorian cyclist
- Arquimedez Pozo (born 1973), Dominican baseball player
- Brandon del Pozo, Cuban Jewish police chief and drug policy lecturer
- Carlos del Pozo (1943–2018), Cuban basketball player
- Chano Pozo (1915–1948), Cuban jazz musician
- Chino Pozo (1915–1980), Cuban drummer
- David del Pozo (born 1997), Spanish footballer
- Diamela del Pozo (born 1976), Cuban singer
- Diego Pozo (born 1978), Argentine footballer
- Édgar Pozo, Bolivian cardiologist
- Elier Pozo (born 1995), Cuban footballer
- Félix Pozo (1899–1967), French footballer
- Gerson Pozo (born 2003), Spanish sprinter
- Hipólito Pozo (born 1941), Ecuadorian cyclist
- Iker Pozo (born 2000), Spanish footballer
- Iván Pozo (born 1978), Spanish boxer
- Jesús del Pozo (1946–2011), Spanish fashion designer
- José Ángel Pozo (born 1996), Spanish footballer
- José del Pozo, Spanish painter
- Juan Carlos Pozo (born 1981), Spanish footballer
- Lucía Pozo Ecuadorian politician
- Luz Pozo Garza (1922–2020), Spanish poet
- Manu Pozo (born 2001), Spanish footballer
- Mauricio Pozo (disambiguation)
- Miguel Del Pozo (born 1992), Dominican baseball pitcher
- Natalia Ojeda del Pozo, Spanish clinical psychologist, neuropsychologist, and university professor
- Nicholas Pozo (born 2005), Gibraltar footballer
- Octavio Pozo (born 1983), Chilean footballer
- Pablo Pozo (born 1973), Chilean football referee
- Pedro Pozo (fl. 1810), Spanish painter
- Rubén Pozo (born 1975), Spanish musician
- Sandro Pozo Vera (born 1987), Cuban chess grandmaster
- Santiago Pozo (born 1957), marketing executive, producer, screenwriter and film director
- Sebastián Pozo (born 1951), Spanish racing cyclist
- Willian Pozo-Venta (born 1997), Cuban footballer
- Yohel Pozo (born 1997), Venezuelan baseball player

== Places ==
- Pozo, California, an unincorporated community in San Luis Obispo County
- Pozo Izquierdo, a small town on the island of Gran Canaria

== Other uses ==
- Craugastor pozo, a frog of family Craugastoridae
- Pozo language

== See also ==
- El Pozo
