= Ecuador at the 2024 Summer Olympics =

- IOC code: ECU
- NOC: Ecuadorian National Olympic Committee
- Website: www.coe.org.ec (in Spanish)

in Paris, France 26 July 2024 – 11 August 2024
- Competitors: 40 (16 men and 24 women) in 12 sports
- Flag bearers (opening): Julio Mendoza Loor & Neisi Dájomes
- Flag bearers (closing): Brian Pintado & Neisi Dájomes
- Medals Ranked 49th: Gold 1 Silver 2 Bronze 2 Total 5

Summer Olympics appearances (overview)
- 1924; 1928–1964; 1968; 1972; 1976; 1980; 1984; 1988; 1992; 1996; 2000; 2004; 2008; 2012; 2016; 2020; 2024; 2028

Ecuador competed at the 2024 Summer Olympics in Paris from 26 July to 11 August 2024. It was the nation's sixteenth appearance at the Summer Olympics and, in terms of number of medals, its most successful one.

== Medalists ==
Medal	Name	Sport	Event	Date
Gold	Brian Pintado	Athletics	Men's 20 km walk	1 August
Silver	Brian Pintado; Glenda Morejón	Athletics	Mixed marathon walk relay	7 August
Silver	Lucía Yépez	Wrestling	Women's freestyle 53 kg	8 August
Bronze	Angie Palacios	Weightlifting	Women's 71 kg	9 August
Bronze	Neisi Dájomes	Weightlifting	Women's 81 kg	10 August

Medals by sport
Sport	1st place, gold medalist(s)	2nd place, silver medalist(s)	3rd place, bronze medalist(s)	Total
Athletics	1	1	0	2
Wrestling	0	1	0	1
Weightlifting	0	0	2	2
Total	1	2	2	5

Medals by gender
Gender	1st place, gold medalist(s)	2nd place, silver medalist(s)	3rd place, bronze medalist(s)	Total
Male	1	0	0	1
Female	0	1	2	3
Mixed	0	1	0	1
Total	1	2	2	5

Medals by date
Date	1st place, gold medalist(s)	2nd place, silver medalist(s)	3rd place, bronze medalist(s)	Total
1 August	1	0	0	1
7 August	0	1	0	1
8 August	0	1	0	1
9 August	0	0	1	1
10 August	0	0	1	1
Total	1	2	2	5

Multiple medalists
Name	Sport	1st place, gold medalist(s)	2nd place, silver medalist(s)	3rd place, bronze medalist(s)	Total
Brian Pintado	Athletics	1	1	0	2

== Competitors ==
The following is the list of number of Ecuadorian competitors in the Games.

Sport	Men	Women	Total
Athletics	4	11	15
Boxing	2	1	3
Cycling	2	0	2
Equestrian	3	0	3
Judo	0	1	1
Modern pentathlon	1	1	2
Shooting	0	2	2
Swimming	2	1	3
Table tennis	1	0	1
Triathlon	0	1	1
Weightlifting	0	3	3
Wrestling	1	3	4
Total	16	24	40

=== List of athletes ===
Athletics
Name	Events
Magaly Bonilla	Women's 20km walk
Juan Caicedo	Men's discus throw
Maribel Caicedo	Women's 100m hurdles
Nicole Caicedo	Women's 200m
Nicole Caicedo	Women's 400m
Rosa Chacha	Women's marathon
Mary Granja	Women's marathon
David Hurtado	Men's 20km walk
Jordy Jiménez	Men's 20km walk
Glenda Morejón	Women's 20km walk
Glenda Morejón	Marathon race walk relay mixed
Aimara Nazareno	Women's 200m
Silvia Ortiz	Women's marathon
Brian Daniel Pintado	Men's 20km walk
Brian Daniel Pintado	Marathon race walk relay mixed
Anahí Suárez	Women's 200m
Ángela Tenorio	Women's 100m
Paula Milena Torres	Women's 20km walk
Cycling
Name	Events
Alfredo Campo	Men's BMX racing
Jhonatan Narváez	Men's road race
Boxing
Name	Events
Gerlon Congo	Men's +92kg
María José Palacios	Women's 60kg
José Rodríguez	Men's 71kg
Equestrian
Name	Events
Julio Mendoza	Individual dressage
Nicolas Wettstein	Individual eventing
Ronald Zabala	Individual eventing
Judo
Name	Events
Vanessa Chalá	Women's 78 kg
Modern Pentathlon
Name	Events
Sol Naranjo	Women's
Andrés Torres Robles	Men's
Shooting
Name	Events
Diana Durango	Women's 10m air pistol
Diana Durango	Women's 25m pistol
Andrea Pérez	Women's 10m air pistol
Andrea Pérez	Women's 25m pistol
Swimming
Name	Events
Anicka Delgado	Women's 50m freestyle
David Farinango	Men's marathon 10km
Tomás Peribonio	Men's 200m individual medley
Table tennis
Name	Events
Alberto Miño	Men's singles
Triathlon
Name	Events
Elizabeth Bravo	Women's
Weightlifting
Name	Events
Lisseth Ayoví	Women's +81kg
Neisi Dájomes	Women's 81kg
Angie Palacios	Women's 71kg
Wrestling
Name	Events
Andrés Montaño	Men's Greco-Roman 67kg
Génesis Reasco	Women's freestyle 76kg
Luisa Valverde	Women's freestyle 57kg
Lucía Yépez	Women's freestyle 53kg

== Athletics ==
Ecuadorian track and field athletes achieved the entry standards for Paris 2024, either by passing the direct qualifying mark (or time for track and road races) or by world ranking, in the following events (a maximum of 3 athletes each):

Key

- Note–Ranks given for track events are within the athlete's heat only
- Q = Qualified for the next round
- q = Qualified for the next round as a fastest loser or, in field events, by position without achieving the qualifying target
- NR = National record
- N/A = Round not applicable for the event
- Bye = Athlete not required to compete in round

Track and road events

Men

Athlete	Event	Heat		Repechage		Semifinals		Final	
Athlete	Event	Result	Rank	Result	Rank	Result	Rank	Result	Rank
Brian Pintado	20 km walk	—N/a						1:18:55	1st place, gold medalist(s)
David Hurtado	20 km walk	—N/a						1:20:30	15
Jordy Jiménez	20 km walk	—N/a						1:21:44	25

Women

Athlete	Event	Preliminary		Heat		Repechage		Semifinals		Final	
Athlete	Event	Result	Rank	Result	Rank	Result	Rank	Result	Rank	Result	Rank
Ángela Tenorio	100 m	Bye		11:35	6	—N/a		Did not advance			
Nicole Caicedo	200 m	—N/a		23.18	4 R	23.04	3	Did not advance			
Nicole Caicedo	400 m	—N/a		DQ		Did not advance					
Aimara Nazareno	200 m	—N/a		23.52	7 R	23.35	5	Did not advance			
Anahí Suárez	200 m	—N/a		23.33	5 R	23.54	5	Did not advance			
Maribel Caicedo	100 m hurdles	—N/a		13.05	8 R	12.83	2 Q	12.67	4	Did not advance	
Mary Granja	Marathon	—N/a								2:34:34	53
Silvia Ortiz	Marathon	—N/a								2:37:23	61
Rosa Chacha	Marathon	—N/a								2:42:14	73
Glenda Morejón	20 km walk	—N/a								1:27:37	6
Paula Milena Torres	20 km walk	—N/a								1:28:48	9
Magaly Bonilla	20 km walk	—N/a								1:30:33	19

Mixed

Athlete	Event	Heat		Repechage		Semifinals		Final	
Athlete	Event	Result	Rank	Result	Rank	Result	Rank	Result	Rank
Brian Pintado; Glenda Morejón	Marathon walk relay	—N/a						2:51:22	2nd place, silver medalist(s)

Field events

Men

Athlete	Event	Qualification		Final	
Athlete	Event	Distance	Position	Distance	Position
Juan José Caicedo	Discus throw	60.99	25	Did not advance	

== Boxing ==
Ecuador entered three boxers into the Olympic tournament. María José Palacios (women's lightweight) and José Rodríguez Tenorio (men's welterweight) qualified themself to Paris by advancing to the Semifinals round at the 2023 Pan American Games in Santiago, Chile. Gerlon Congo (men's super heavyweight) secured his spots following the triumph in quota bouts round, at the 2024 World Olympic Qualification Tournament 2 in Bangkok, Thailand.

Men

Athlete	Event	Round of 32	Round of 16	Quarterfinals	Semifinals	Final	
Athlete	Event	Opposition Result	Opposition Result	Opposition Result	Opposition Result	Opposition Result	Rank
José Rodríguez Tenorio	–71 kg	Bye	Dev (IND) L 2–3	Did not advance			
Gerlon Congo	+92 kg	—N/a	Teixeira (BRA) W 3–2	Aboudou Moindze (FRA) L 1–4	Did not advance		

Women

Athlete	Event	Round of 32	Round of 16	Quarterfinals	Semifinals	Final	
Athlete	Event	Opposition Result	Opposition Result	Opposition Result	Opposition Result	Opposition Result	Rank
María José Palacios	–60 kg	Alexiusson (SWE) W 4–1	McDonald (AUS) W 5–0	Wu S-y (TPE) L 1–4	Did not advance		

== Cycling ==
=== Road ===
Ecuador entered one rider to compete in the men's event after qualified through the UCI Nation Ranking.

Men

Athlete	Event	Time	Rank
Jhonatan Narváez	Road race	6:26:57	45

=== BMX ===
Race

Ecuadorian riders secured a single quota place in the men's BMX race for Paris 2024 by topping the field of nations vying for qualification at the 2023 Pan American Championships in Riobamba, Ecuador.

Athlete	Event	Quarterfinals		LCQ		Semifinals		Final	
Athlete	Event	Points	Rank	Time	Rank	Points	Rank	Result	Rank
Alfredo Campo	Men's	8	7 Q	—N/a		19	13	Did not advance	

== Equestrian ==
Ecuador send a squad of three equestrians. Ecuador sent one dressage rider, for the first time since Los Angeles 1984, and two eventing riders to the Games, as one of two highest-ranked eligible nation within the individual FEI dressage qualification for Group D and E through the 2023 Pan American Games in Santiago, Chile, and through the establishments of olympics eventing final ranking for Groups D and E (Americas).

=== Dressage ===
Athlete	Horse	Event	Grand Prix		Grand Prix Freestyle		Overall	
Athlete	Horse	Event	Score	Rank	Technical	Artistic	Score	Rank
Julio Mendoza Loor	Jewel's Goldstrike	Individual	70.839	5	Did not advance			

Qualification Legend: Q = Qualified for the final based on position in group; q = Qualified for the final based on overall position

=== Eventing ===
Athlete	Horse	Event	Dressage		Cross-country			Jumping						Total	
Athlete	Horse	Event	Dressage		Cross-country			Qualifier			Final			Total	
Athlete	Horse	Event	Penalties	Rank	Penalties	Total	Rank	Penalties	Total	Rank	Penalties	Total	Rank	Penalties	Rank
Nicolas Wettstein	Altier D'Aurois	Individual	42.30	60	65.40	107.70	55	50.80	158.50	51	Eliminated	Did not advance		158.50	51
Ronald Zabala-Goetschel	Wundermaske	Individual	37.70	51	Eliminated	Did not advance								Eliminated	

== Judo ==
Ecuador qualified one judoka for the following weight class at the Games. Vanessa Chalá (women's heavyweight, 78 kg) got qualified via continental quota based on Olympic point rankings.

Women

Athlete	Event	Round of 32	Round of 16	Quarterfinals	Semifinals	Repechage	Final / BM	
Athlete	Event	Opposition Result	Opposition Result	Opposition Result	Opposition Result	Opposition Result	Opposition Result	Rank
Vanessa Chalá	−78 kg	Otgonbayar (MGL) L 00–01	Did not advance					

== Modern pentathlon ==
Ecuador modern pentathletes confirmed two quota places for Paris 2024. Andrés Torres and Sol Naranjo secured one of five available spots in their respective event at the 2023 Pan American Games in Santiago, Chile.

Athlete	Event	Fencing ranking round (Épée one touch)			Semifinals													Final												
Athlete	Event	Fencing ranking round (Épée one touch)			FBR	Swimming (200 m freestyle)			Riding (Show jumping)				Shooting / Running (10 m laser pistol / 3000 m cross-country)			Total		FBR	Swimming			Riding (Show jumping)				Shooting / Running			Total	
Athlete	Event	V – D	Rank	MP points	BP	Time	Rank	MP points	Time	Rank	Pen	MP points	Time	Rank	MP Points	Rank	MP points	BP	Faults	Rank	MP points	Time	Rank	Pen	MP points	Time	Rank	MP Points	Pts	Rank
Andrés Torres	Men's	16–19	22	205	2	1:59.70	3	311	54.63	15	17	283	11:29.63	18	611	17	1412	Did not advance												
Sol Naranjo	Women's	13–22	33	190	0	2:38.78	18	233	56.68	13	7	293	12:24.75	15	556	17	1272	Did not advance												

== Shooting ==
Ecuadorian shooters achieved quota places for the following events based on their results at the 2022 and 2023 ISSF World Championships, 2022 and 2024 Championships of the Americas, 2023 Pan American Games, and 2024 ISSF World Olympic Qualification Tournament.

Women

Athlete	Event	Qualification		Final	
Athlete	Event	Points	Rank	Points	Rank
Andrea Pérez Peña	10 m air pistol	569-16x	26	Did not advance	
Andrea Pérez Peña	25 m pistol	583-19x	10	Did not advance	
Diana Durango	10 m air pistol	558-9x	41	Did not advance	
Diana Durango	25 m pistol	581-22x	15	Did not advance	

== Swimming ==
Ecuador entered three swimmers for Paris 2024. David Farinango obtained one open swimming quota for his nation, through the top fifteen results athletes not yet qualified, at the 2024 World Aquatics Championships in Doha, Qatar; meanwhile, the other swimmers qualified through the allocations of universality places.

Men

Athlete	Event	Heat		Semifinals		Final	
Athlete	Event	Time	Rank	Time	Rank	Time	Rank
Tomas Peribonio	200 m medley	2:03.40	19	Did not advance			
David Farinango	10 km open water	—N/a				1:57:08.6	17

Women

Athlete	Event	Heat		Semifinals		Final	
Athlete	Event	Time	Rank	Time	Rank	Time	Rank
Anicka Delgado	50 m freestyle	25.43	26	Did not advance			

== Table tennis ==
Ecuador entered one table tennis player into Paris 2024. Alberto Miño qualified for the games by virtue of the top twelve ranked players, in the men's single classes, through the cut-off of the world ranking for Paris 2024.

Men

Athlete	Event	Preliminary	Round of 64	Round of 32	Round of 16	Quarterfinals	Semifinals	Final / BM	
Athlete	Event	Opposition Result	Opposition Result	Opposition Result	Opposition Result	Opposition Result	Opposition Result	Opposition Result	Rank
Alberto Miño	Singles	Bye	Luu (AUS) W 4–3	Assar (EGY) L 0–4	Did not advance				

== Triathlon ==
Ecuador achieved a quota (one woman) for the women's individual triathlon competition at the 2024 Summer Olympics through the Individual Olympic Qualification Ranking.

Individual

Women

Athlete	Event	Time						Rank
Athlete	Event	Swim (1.5 km)	Trans 1	Bike (40 km)	Trans 2	Run (10 km)	Total	Rank
Elizabeth Bravo	Individual	24:06	0:57	1:00:38	0:30	35:38	2:01:49	34

== Weightlifting ==
Ecuador entered three weightlifters into the Olympic competition. Angie Palacios (women's 71 kg), Neisi Dájomes (women's 81 kg) and Lisseth Ayoví (women's +81 kg) secured one of the top ten slots in their respective weight divisions based on the IWF Olympic Qualification Rankings.

Women

Athlete	Event	Snatch		Clean & Jerk		Total	Rank
Athlete	Event	Result	Rank	Result	Rank	Total	Rank
Angie Palacios	−71 kg	116	2	140	3	256	3rd place, bronze medalist(s)
Neisi Dájomes	−81 kg	122	1	145	5	267	3rd place, bronze medalist(s)
Lisseth Ayoví	+81 kg	123	4	160	4	283	4

== Wrestling ==
Ecuador qualified four wrestlers for each of the following classes into the Olympic competition. Lucía Yépez qualified for the games by virtue of top five results through the 2023 World Championships in Belgrade, Serbia. Meanwhile, the other three qualified for Paris 2024, following the triumph of advancing to the final round at 2024 Pan American Olympic Qualification Tournament in Acapulco, Mexico.

Key:

- VT (ranking points: 5–0 or 0–5) – Victory by fall.
- VB (ranking points: 5–0 or 0–5) – Victory by injury (VF for forfeit, VA for withdrawal or disqualification)
- PP (ranking points: 3–1 or 1–3) – Decision by points – the loser with technical points.
- PO (ranking points: 3–0 or 0–3) – Decision by points – the loser without technical points.
- ST (ranking points: 4–0 or 0–4) – Great superiority – the loser without technical points and a margin of victory of at least 8 (Greco-Roman) or 10 (freestyle) points.
- SP (ranking points: 4–1 or 1–4) – Technical superiority – the loser with technical points and a margin of victory of at least 8 (Greco-Roman) or 10 (freestyle) points.

Women

Freestyle

Athlete	Event	Round of 16	Quarterfinals	Semifinals	Repechage	Final / BM	
Athlete	Event	Opposition Result	Opposition Result	Opposition Result	Opposition Result	Opposition Result	Rank
Lucía Yépez	53 kg	Choe H-g (PRK) W 7–4 ^{PP}	Ana (ROU) W 7–0 ^{VT}	Wendle (GER) W 10–0 ^{ST}	—N/a	Fujinami (JPN) L 0–10 ^{ST}	2nd place, silver medalist(s)
Luisa Valverde	57 kg	Russo (ITA) W 6–0 ^{VT}	Sakurai (JPN) L 0–11 ^{VT}	Did not advance	Taylor (CAN) L 0–13 ^{ST}	Did not advance	7
Génesis Reasco	76 kg	Kagami (JPN) L 0–2 ^{PO}	Did not advance		Adar Yiğit (TUR) W 3–1 ^{PP}	Rentería (COL) L 1–2 ^{PP}	=5

Men

Greco-Roman

Athlete	Event	Round of 16	Quarterfinals	Semifinals	Repechage	Final / BM	
Athlete	Event	Opposition Result	Opposition Result	Opposition Result	Opposition Result	Opposition Result	Rank
Andrés Montaño	67 kg	Galstyan (ARM) L 2–3 ^{PP}	Did not advance				9
