= Ecuador at the 1980 Summer Olympics =

- IOC code: ECU
- NOC: Ecuadorian National Olympic Committee

in Moscow
- Competitors: 12 (11 men, 1 woman) in 5 sports
- Flag bearer: Nancy Vallecilla
- Medals: Gold 0 Silver 0 Bronze 0 Total 0

Summer Olympics appearances (overview)
- 1924; 1928–1964; 1968; 1972; 1976; 1980; 1984; 1988; 1992; 1996; 2000; 2004; 2008; 2012; 2016; 2020; 2024

Ecuador competed at the 1980 Summer Olympics in Moscow, USSR. Twelve competitors, eleven men and one woman, took part in thirteen events in five sports. This was the nation's fourth Olympics appearance, since its maiden participation at the 1924 Summer Games in Paris.

== Athletics ==
Women's 100 m Hurdles

- Nancy Vallecilla
  - Heat — did not start (→ did not advance)

Women's Pentathlon

- Nancy Vallecilla — 3170 points (→ no ranking)
  1. 100 metres — 14.46s
  2. Shot Put — 11.12m
  3. High Jump — 1.68m
  4. Long Jump — 5.45m
  5. 800 metres — DNF

== Boxing ==
Men's Light Flyweight (48 kg)

- Lincoln Salcedo
  1. First Round — Bye
  2. Second Round — Lost to Ahmed Siad (Algeria) on points (0-5)

Men's Flyweight (51 kg)

- Jorge Monard

Men's Heavyweight (+ 81 kg)

- Luis Castillo
  1. First Round — Lost to Jürgen Fanghänel (East Germany) on points (1-4)

== Cycling ==
Four cyclists represented Ecuador in 1980.

1000m time trial

- Esteban Espinosa

Individual pursuit

- Jhon Jarrín

Team pursuit

- Esteban Espinosa
- Jhon Jarrín
- Edwin Mena
- Juan Palacios

== Judo ==
- Jimmy Arévalo
- Milton Estrella

== Swimming ==
- Diego Quiroga
- Enrique Ledesma
