= Ecuador at the 2020 Summer Olympics =

- IOC code: ECU
- NOC: Ecuadorian National Olympic Committee
- Website: www.coe.org.ec (in Spanish)

in Tokyo, Japan July 23, 2021 – August 8, 2021
- Competitors: 48 in 15 sports
- Flag bearers (opening): Alexandra Escobar; Julio Castillo
- Flag bearer (closing): Glenda Morejón
- Medals Ranked 38th: Gold 2 Silver 1 Bronze 0 Total 3

Summer Olympics appearances (overview)
- 1924; 1928–1964; 1968; 1972; 1976; 1980; 1984; 1988; 1992; 1996; 2000; 2004; 2008; 2012; 2016; 2020; 2024; 2028

Ecuador competed at the 2020 Summer Olympics in Tokyo. Originally scheduled to take place from 24 July to 9 August 2020, the Games were postponed to 23 July to 8 August 2021, because of the COVID-19 pandemic. It was the nation's fifteenth appearance at the Summer Olympics, and its most successful to date. The country won its third, fourth, and fifth ever medals (and its second and third ever gold medals), two golds and one silver, respectively, during the games.

== Medalists ==
Medal	Name	Sport	Event	Date
Gold	Richard Carapaz	Cycling	Men's road race	24 July
Gold	Neisi Dájomes	Weightlifting	Women's 76 kg	1 August
Silver	Tamara Salazar	Weightlifting	Women's 87 kg	2 August

Medals by sport
Sport	1st place, gold medalist(s)	2nd place, silver medalist(s)	3rd place, bronze medalist(s)	Total
Weightlifting	1	1	0	2
Cycling	1	0	0	1
Total	2	1	0	3

Medals by gender
Gender	1st place, gold medalist(s)	2nd place, silver medalist(s)	3rd place, bronze medalist(s)	Total
Male	1	0	0	1
Female	1	1	0	2
Mixed	0	0	0	0
Total	2	1	0	3

Medals by date
Date	1st place, gold medalist(s)	2nd place, silver medalist(s)	3rd place, bronze medalist(s)	Total
24 July	1	0	0	1
1 August	1	0	0	1
2 August	0	1	0	1
Total	2	1	0	3

== Competitors ==
The following is the list of number of competitors participating in the Games:

Sport	Men	Women	Total
Archery	0	1	1
Athletics	8	10	18
Boxing	2	2	4
Cycling	3	1	4
Equestrian	1	0	1
Golf	0	1	1
Judo	1	2	3
Modern pentathlon	0	1	1
Shooting	0	2	2
Surfing	0	1	1
Swimming	2	2	4
Table tennis	1	0	1
Triathlon	0	1	1
Weightlifting	0	4	4
Wrestling	0	2	2
Total	18	30	48

== Archery ==
One Ecuadorian archer qualified for the women's individual recurve at the Games by securing the last of three available spots as the next highest-ranked eligible placer at the 2021 Pan American Championships in Monterrey, Mexico, signifying the country's debut in the sport.

Women

Athlete	Event	Ranking round		Round of 64	Round of 32	Round of 16	Quarterfinals	Semifinals	Final / BM	
Athlete	Event	Score	Seed	Opposition Score	Opposition Score	Opposition Score	Opposition Score	Opposition Score	Opposition Score	Rank
Adriana Espinosa	Individual	606	62	Kang C-y (KOR) L 0–6	Did not advance					

== Athletics ==
Ecuadorian athletes further achieved the entry standards, either by qualifying time or by world ranking, in the following track and field events (up to a maximum of 3 athletes in each event):

Key

- Note–Ranks given for track events are within the athlete's heat only
- Q = Qualified for the next round
- q = Qualified for the next round as a fastest loser or, in field events, by position without achieving the qualifying target
- NR = National record
- N/A = Round not applicable for the event
- Bye = Athlete not required to compete in round

Track and road events
Men

Athlete	Event	Final	
Athlete	Event	Result	Rank
David Hurtado	20 km walk	1:24:31	19
Jordy Jiménez	20 km walk	1:27:52	35
Brian Pintado	20 km walk	1:22:54	12
Jhonatan Amores	50 km walk	4:05:47	27
Andrés Chocho	50 km walk	3:59:03 SB	19
Claudio Villanueva	50 km walk	4:53:09	47

Women

Athlete	Event	Heat		Quarterfinal		Semifinal		Final	
Athlete	Event	Result	Rank	Result	Rank	Result	Rank	Result	Rank
Ángela Tenorio	100 m	Bye		11.59	6	Did not advance			
Yuliana Angulo; Marizol Landázuri; Gabriela Anahí Suárez; Ángela Tenorio	4 × 100 m relay	43.69 NR	8	—N/a				Did not advance	
Andrea Bonilla	Marathon	—N/a						2:43:30	60
Rosa Chacha	Marathon	—N/a						2:36:44	41
Karla Jaramillo	20 km walk	—N/a						1:36:32	28
Glenda Morejón	20 km walk	—N/a						DNF	
Paola Pérez	20 km walk	—N/a						1:31:26	9

== Boxing ==
Ecuador entered four boxers (two per gender) to compete in each of the following weight classes into the Olympic tournament. With the cancellation of the 2021 Pan American Qualification Tournament in Buenos Aires, Jean Carlos Caicedo (men's featherweight) and two-time Olympian Julio Castillo (men's heavyweight) finished among the top five of their respective weight divisions to secure their places on the Ecuadorian squad based on the IOC's Boxing Task Force Rankings for the Americas. On the women's side, María José Palacios (lightweight) and Erika Pachito (middleweight) completed the nation's boxing lineup by topping the list of eligible boxers from the Americas in their respective weight divisions of the IOC's Boxing Task Force Rankings.

Men

Athlete	Event	Round of 32	Round of 16	Quarterfinals	Semifinals	Final	
Athlete	Event	Opposition Result	Opposition Result	Opposition Result	Opposition Result	Opposition Result	Rank
Jean Carlos Caicedo	Featherweight	Butsenko (UKR) W 3–2	Takyi (GHA) L 0–5	Did not advance			
Julio Castillo	Heavyweight	Bye	Ishaish (JOR) L 0–4	Did not advance			

Women

Athlete	Event	Round of 32	Round of 16	Quarterfinals	Semifinals	Final	
Athlete	Event	Opposition Result	Opposition Result	Opposition Result	Opposition Result	Opposition Result	Rank
María José Palacios	Lightweight	Seesondee (THA) L 0–5	Did not advance				
Érika Pachito	Middleweight	—N/a	Gramane (MOZ) L 1–4	Did not advance			

== Cycling ==
=== Road ===
Ecuador entered two riders to compete in the men's Olympic road race, by virtue of their top 50 national finish (for men) in the UCI World Ranking.

Athlete	Event	Time	Rank
Richard Carapaz	Men's road race	6:05.26	1st place, gold medalist(s)
Jhonatan Narváez	Men's road race	6:15.38	47

=== BMX ===
Ecuador received one men's and one women's quota spot each for BMX at the Olympics, as a result of the nation's ninth-place finish for men in the UCI BMX Olympic Qualification List and a top three eligible placement for women in the UCI BMX Individual Ranking List of June 1, 2021.

Athlete	Event	Quarterfinal		Semifinal		Final	
Athlete	Event	Points	Rank	Points	Rank	Result	Rank
Alfredo Campo	Men's race	12	4 Q	8	4 Q	40.705	5
Doménica Azuero	Women's race	13	5	Did not advance			

== Equestrian ==
With Chile failing to comply with the minimum eligibility requirements, Ecuador received an invitation from FEI to send an eventing rider to the Games, as the next highest-ranked eligible nation within the individual FEI Olympic Rankings for Group E (Central and South America).

=== Eventing ===
Athlete	Horse	Event	Dressage		Cross-country			Jumping						Total	
Athlete	Horse	Event	Dressage		Cross-country			Qualifier			Final			Total	
Athlete	Horse	Event	Penalties	Rank	Penalties	Total	Rank	Penalties	Total	Rank	Penalties	Total	Rank	Penalties	Rank
Nicolas Wettstein	Altier d'Aurois	Individual	40.90	56	48.40	89.30	45	16.00	105.30	41	Did not advance			105.30	41

== Golf ==
Ecuador entered one female golfer into the Olympic tournament. Daniela Darquea (world no. 349) qualified directly among the top 60 eligible players for their respective events based on the IGF World Rankings.

Athlete	Event	Round 1	Round 2	Round 3	Round 4	Total		
Athlete	Event	Score	Score	Score	Score	Score	Par	Rank
Daniela Darquea	Women's	72	73	65	73	283	−1	=38

== Judo ==
Ecuador entered three judoka (one man and two women) for each of the following weight classes at the Games. Rio 2016 Olympian Lenin Preciado (men's extra-lightweight, 60 kg) and rookie Vanessa Chalá (women's half-heavyweight, 78 kg) were selected among the top 18 judoka of their respective weight classes based on the IJF World Ranking List of June 28, 2021, while two-time Olympian Estefania García (women's half-middleweight, 63 kg) accepted a continental berth from the Americas as the nation's top-ranked judoka outside of direct qualifying position.

Men

Athlete	Event	Round of 64	Round of 32	Round of 16	Quarterfinals	Semifinals	Repechage	Final / BM	
Athlete	Event	Opposition Result	Opposition Result	Opposition Result	Opposition Result	Opposition Result	Opposition Result	Opposition Result	Rank
Lenin Preciado	−60 kg	—N/a	Gerchev (BUL) L 00–10	Did not advance					

Women

Athlete	Event	Round of 64	Round of 32	Round of 16	Quarterfinals	Semifinals	Repechage	Final / BM	
Athlete	Event	Opposition Result	Opposition Result	Opposition Result	Opposition Result	Opposition Result	Opposition Result	Opposition Result	Rank
Estefania García	−63 kg	—N/a	Ozdoba-Błach (POL) L 00–10	Did not advance					
Vanessa Chalá	−78 kg	—N/a	Turchyn (UKR) L 00–10	Did not advance					

== Modern pentathlon ==
Ecuador qualified one modern pentathlete for the women's event, signifying the country's Olympic debut in the sport. Marcela Cuaspud secured a selection by finishing among the top two for Latin America and thirteen overall at the 2019 Pan American Games in Lima.

Athlete	Event	Fencing (épée one touch)				Swimming (200 m freestyle)			Riding (show jumping)			Combined: shooting/running (10 m air pistol)/(3200 m)			Total points	Final rank
Athlete	Event	RR	BR	Rank	MP points	Time	Rank	MP points	Penalties	Rank	MP points	Time	Rank	MP Points	Total points	Final rank
Marcela Cuaspud	Women's	4–31	0	36	124	2:27.91	35	255	EL	=31	0	13:39.94	33	481	860	35

== Shooting ==
Ecuadorian shooters achieved quota places for the following events by virtue of their best finishes at the 2018 ISSF World Championships, the 2019 ISSF World Cup series, the 2019 Pan American Games, and Championships of the Americas, as long as they obtained a minimum qualifying score (MQS) by May 31, 2020.

Women

Athlete	Event	Qualification		Final	
Athlete	Event	Points	Rank	Points	Rank
Andrea Pérez Peña	10 m air pistol	565-11x	36	Did not advance	
Andrea Pérez Peña	25 m pistol	582-18x	13	Did not advance	
Diana Durango	10 m air pistol	559-8x	45	Did not advance	
Diana Durango	25 m pistol	569-15x	38	Did not advance	

== Surfing ==
Ecuador sent one surfer to compete in the women's shortboard race at the Games. Mimi Barona secured a spot previously allocated by the defending champion Daniella Rosas, as the next highest-ranked surfer vying for qualification, following her silver-medal finish at the 2019 Pan American Games in Lima, Peru.

Women

Athlete	Event	Round 1		Round 2		Round 3	Quarterfinal	Semifinal	Final / BM	
Athlete	Event	Score	Rank	Score	Rank	Opposition Result	Opposition Result	Opposition Result	Opposition Result	Rank
Mimi Barona	Shortboard	7.66	3 q	8.87	5	Did not advance				

== Swimming ==
Ecuador received a universality invitation from FINA to send two top-ranked swimmers (one per gender) in their respective individual events to the Olympics, based on the FINA Points System of June 28, 2021.

Men

Athlete	Event	Heat		Semifinal		Final	
Athlete	Event	Time	Rank	Time	Rank	Time	Rank
Tomas Peribonio	200 m medley	2:00.62	36	Did not advance			
Tomas Peribonio	400 m medley	4:18.73	24	—N/a		Did not advance	
David Farinango	10 km open water	—N/a				1:53:09.8	15

Women

Athlete	Event	Heat		Semifinal		Final	
Athlete	Event	Time	Rank	Time	Rank	Time	Rank
Anicka Delgado	50 m freestyle	25.36	=25	Did not advance			
Anicka Delgado	100 m freestyle	55.56	31	Did not advance			
Samantha Arévalo	10 km open water	—N/a				2:01:30.6	11

== Table tennis ==
For the first time since Barcelona 1992, Ecuador entered one athlete into the table tennis competition at the Games. Alberto Miño scored a second-stage final triumph to earn one of the remaining two tickets in the men's singles at the 2021 Latin American Qualification Tournament in Rosario, Argentina.

Men

Athlete	Event	Preliminary	Round 1	Round 2	Round 3	Round of 16	Quarterfinals	Semifinals	Final / BM	
Athlete	Event	Opposition Result	Opposition Result	Opposition Result	Opposition Result	Opposition Result	Opposition Result	Opposition Result	Opposition Result	Rank
Alberto Miño	Singles	Bye	Kumar (USA) L 2–4	Did not advance						

== Triathlon ==
Ecuador has entered one triathlete to compete at the Games.

Athlete	Event	Time						Rank
Athlete	Event	Swim (1.5 km)	Trans 1	Bike (40 km)	Trans 2	Run (10 km)	Total	Rank
Elizabeth Bravo	Women's	20:15	0:42	Lapped				

== Weightlifting ==
Ecuador entered four female weightlifters into the Olympic competition. Rio 2016 Olympian Neisi Dájomes (women's 76 kg), rookies Angie Palacios (women's 64 kg) and Tamara Salazar (women's 87 kg), with Alexandra Escobar leading the squad at her fifth straight Games, secured one of the top eight slots each in their respective weight divisions based on the IWF Absolute World Ranking.

Athlete	Event	Snatch		Clean & Jerk		Total	Rank
Athlete	Event	Result	Rank	Result	Rank	Total	Rank
Alexandra Escobar	Women's −59 kg	~~95~~	DNF	—	—	—	DNF
Angie Palacios	Women's −64 kg	104	2	122	7	226	6
Neisi Dájomes	Women's −76 kg	118	1	145	1	263	1st place, gold medalist(s)
Tamara Salazar	Women's −87 kg	113	3	150	2	263	2nd place, silver medalist(s)

== Wrestling ==
Ecuador qualified two wrestlers for each of the following classes into the Olympic competition. One of them secured a place in the women's freestyle 50 kg by progressing to the top two finals at the 2021 World Qualification Tournament in Sofia, Bulgaria.

On June 15, 2021, United World Wrestling awarded an additional Olympic license to Luisa Valverde in the women's freestyle 53 kg, as the next highest-ranked wrestler vying for qualification at the 2019 Worlds, citing North Korea's withdrawal from the Games.

Key:

- VT (ranking points: 5–0 or 0–5) – Victory by fall.
- VB (ranking points: 5–0 or 0–5) – Victory by injury (VF for forfeit, VA for withdrawal or disqualification)
- PP (ranking points: 3–1 or 1–3) – Decision by points – the loser with technical points.
- PO (ranking points: 3–0 or 0–3) – Decision by points – the loser without technical points.
- ST (ranking points: 4–0 or 0–4) – Great superiority – the loser without technical points and a margin of victory of at least 8 (Greco-Roman) or 10 (freestyle) points.
- SP (ranking points: 4–1 or 1–4) – Technical superiority – the loser with technical points and a margin of victory of at least 8 (Greco-Roman) or 10 (freestyle) points.

Women

Freestyle

Athlete	Event	Round of 16	Quarterfinal	Semifinal	Repechage	Final / BM	
Athlete	Event	Opposition Result	Opposition Result	Opposition Result	Opposition Result	Opposition Result	Rank
Lucía Yépez	50 kg	Islamova (KAZ) W 3–1 ^{PP}	Susaki (JPN) L 0–4 ^{ST}	Did not advance	Tsogt-Ochiryn (MGL) L 0–5 ^{VB}	Did not advance	8
Luisa Valverde	53 kg	Prevolaraki (GRE) W 3–1 ^{PP}	Bat-Ochiryn (MGL) L 1–4 ^{SP}	Did not advance			8

== See also ==
- Ecuador at the 2019 Pan American Games
