= Ecuador at the 2000 Summer Olympics =

- IOC code: ECU
- NOC: Ecuadorian National Olympic Committee
- Website: www.coe.org.ec (in Spanish)

in Sydney
- Competitors: 10 (7 men and 3 women) in 5 sports
- Flag bearer: Martha Tenorio
- Medals: Gold 0 Silver 0 Bronze 0 Total 0

Summer Olympics appearances (overview)
- 1924; 1928–1964; 1968; 1972; 1976; 1980; 1984; 1988; 1992; 1996; 2000; 2004; 2008; 2012; 2016; 2020; 2024

Ecuador competed at the 2000 Summer Olympics in Sydney, Australia. Since it first participated in the 1924 Summer Olympics in Paris, this was the nation's tenth appearance at the Olympic Games.

Jefferson Pérez, who won a gold medal at the 1996 Summer Olympics, finished in fourth place in the men's 20 km race walk.

== Competitors ==
The following is the list of number of competitors in the Games.

Sport	Men	Women	Total
Athletics	2	1	3
Judo	1	1	2
Shooting	0	1	1
Swimming	3	0	3
Weightlifting	1	0	1
Total	7	3	10

== Results and competitors by event ==
=== Athletics ===
Men's Marathon

- Silvio Guerra
  - Final – 2:16.27 (→ 14th place)

Men's 20 km Road Walk

- Jefferson Pérez
  - Final – 1:20.18 (→ 4th place)

Women's Marathon

- Martha Tenorio
  - Final – 2:33.54 (→ 25th place)

=== Judo ===
Men's Extra-Lightweight

- Juan Barahona
  - Round One – Bye
  - Round Two – Lost to Gheorghe Kurgheleasvili (MDA)

Women's Heavyweight

- Carmen Chalá
  - Round One – Lost to Colleen Rosensteel (USA)

=== Shooting ===
Women's Air Pistol, 10 metres

- Carmen Malo
  - 21st place (tied)

=== Swimming ===
Men's 50m Freestyle

- Julio Santos
  - Preliminary Heat – 22.83 (→ did not advance, 19th place)

Men's 100m Freestyle

- Felipe Delgado
  - Preliminary Heat – 52.78 (→ did not advance, 56th place)

Men's 100m Butterfly

- Roberto Delgado
  - Preliminary Heat – 56.07 (→ did not advance, 46th place)

Men's 200m Butterfly

- Roberto Delgado
  - Preliminary Heat – 02:08.18 (→ did not advance, 43rd place)

=== Weightlifting ===
Men

Athlete	Event	Snatch			Clean & Jerk			Total	Rank
Athlete	Event	1	2	3	1	2	3	Total	Rank
Boris Burov	– 105 kg	175.0	182.5	~~185.0~~	205.0	~~210.0~~	~~210.0~~	387.5	10

== See also ==
- Ecuador at the 1999 Pan American Games
