= Ecuador at the 2016 Summer Olympics =

- IOC code: ECU
- NOC: Ecuadorian National Olympic Committee
- Website: www.coe.org.ec (in Spanish)

in Rio de Janeiro
- Competitors: 38 in 13 sports
- Flag bearer: Estefania García
- Medals: Gold 0 Silver 0 Bronze 0 Total 0

Summer Olympics appearances (overview)
- 1924; 1928–1964; 1968; 1972; 1976; 1980; 1984; 1988; 1992; 1996; 2000; 2004; 2008; 2012; 2016; 2020; 2024; 2028

Ecuador competed at the 2016 Summer Olympics in Rio de Janeiro, Brazil, from 5 to 21 August 2016. It was the nation's fourteenth appearance at the Summer Olympics since its debut in 1924.

The Ecuadorian National Olympic Committee (Spanish: Comité Olímpico Ecuatoriano) fielded a team of 38 athletes, 23 men and 15 women, to compete in 13 sports at the Games. It was the nation's largest ever delegation, eclipsing the previous record of 36 athletes who took part at the London Games four years earlier. Athletics had the largest roster with a total of 16 athletes; there was only a single competitor each in sprint canoeing, equestrian eventing, rowing, shooting, and triathlon.

The Ecuadorian team featured 20 returning Olympians, with two of them attending their fourth consecutive Games: distance runner Byron Piedra (men's marathon) and weightlifter Alexandra Escobar (women's 58 kg). Race walkers Andrés Chocho and Rolando Saquipay were among the Ecuadorians headed to their third Olympic Games, while sixteen others previously competed in London, including Argentina-born sprint kayaker César de Cesare, triathlete Elizabeth Bravo, professional boxers Julio Castillo, Marlo Delgado, and Carlos Quipo, and freestyle wrestler Lissette Antes. A top eight finalist at the 2015 World Championships, Chocho was originally selected to carry the Ecuadorian flag, but decided to focus on his training for the competition. Instead, judoka Estefania García (women's 63 kg) took Chocho's spot at the last minute to lead the team in the opening ceremony.

Ecuador narrowly missed out on its first Olympic medal since 2008, as Escobar placed fourth in the women's 58 kg, the most successful result of her Olympic career.

== Athletics (track and field) ==
Ecuadorian athletes have so far achieved qualifying standards in the following athletics events (up to a maximum of 3 athletes in each event):

Key

- Note–Ranks given for track events are within the athlete's heat only
- Q = Qualified for the next round
- q = Qualified for the next round as a fastest loser or, in field events, by position without achieving the qualifying target
- NR = National record
- N/A = Round not applicable for the event
- Bye = Athlete not required to compete in round
- NM = No mark

Track & road events
Men

Athlete	Event	Final	
Athlete	Event	Result	Rank
Miguel Ángel Almachi	Marathon	2:23:00	85
Segundo Jami	Marathon	2:31:07	124
Byron Piedra	Marathon	2:14:12	18
Mauricio Arteaga	20 km walk	DSQ	
Andrés Chocho	20 km walk	DSQ	
Brian Pintado	20 km walk	1:23:44	37
Andrés Chocho	50 km walk	DSQ	
Rolando Saquipay	50 km walk	4:07:29	34
Claudio Villanueva	50 km walk	4:19:33	45

Women

Athlete	Event	Heat		Quarterfinal		Semifinal		Final	
Athlete	Event	Result	Rank	Result	Rank	Result	Rank	Result	Rank
Narcisa Landázuri	100 m	Bye		11.38	4 q	11.27	6	Did not advance	
Ángela Tenorio	100 m	Bye		11.35	3 q	11.14	5	Did not advance	
Ángela Tenorio	200 m	22.94	4 q	—N/a		22.99	7	Did not advance	
María Elena Calle	Marathon	—N/a						2:48:39	99
Rosa Chacha	Marathon	—N/a						2:48:52	100
Silvia Paredes	Marathon	—N/a						2:48:01	95
Magaly Bonilla	20 km walk	—N/a						1:34:54	27
Maritza Guamán	20 km walk	—N/a						1:35:56	36
Paola Pérez	20 km walk	—N/a						1:33:53	24

== Boxing ==
Ecuador has entered four boxers to compete in each of the following weight classes into the Olympic boxing tournament. Carlos Andres Mina had claimed his Olympic spot with a semifinal victory at the 2016 American Qualification Tournament in Buenos Aires, Argentina. Meanwhile, London 2012 Olympians Carlos Quipo (light flyweight), Marlo Delgado (middleweight), and Julio Castillo (heavyweight) secured additional places on the Ecuadorian roster at the 2016 APB and WSB Olympic Qualifier in Vargas, Venezuela.

Athlete	Event	Round of 32	Round of 16	Quarterfinals	Semifinals	Final	
Athlete	Event	Opposition Result	Opposition Result	Opposition Result	Opposition Result	Opposition Result	Rank
Carlos Quipo	Men's light flyweight	Bye	Gankhuyagiin (MGL); W 3–0	Hernández (USA); L 0–3	Did not advance		
Marlo Delgado	Men's middleweight	Pinto (VEN); W 3–0	Assomo (FRA); L 1–2	Did not advance			
Carlos Andrés Mina	Men's light heavyweight	Michel (GER); W 3–0	Ward (IRL); W 2–1	Bauderlique (FRA); L TKO	Did not advance		
Julio Castillo	Men's heavyweight	Bye	Tulaganov (UZB); L 0–3	Did not advance			

== Canoeing ==
=== Sprint ===
Ecuadorian canoeists have qualified one boat in each of the following events through the 2015 ICF Canoe Sprint World Championships.

Athlete	Event	Heats		Semifinals		Final	
Athlete	Event	Time	Rank	Time	Rank	Time	Rank
César de Cesare	Men's K-1 200 m	35.216	5 Q	35.936	8 FB	37.169	11

Qualification Legend: FA = Qualify to final (medal); FB = Qualify to final B (non-medal)

== Cycling ==
=== Road ===
Ecuador has qualified one rider in the men's Olympic road race by virtue of his top 20 individual ranking in the 2015 UCI America Tour.

Athlete	Event	Time	Rank
Byron Guamá	Men's road race	Did not finish	

=== BMX ===
Ecuadorian riders qualified for one men's quota place for BMX at the Olympics, as a result of the nation's top four finish in the UCI BMX Individual Ranking List of 31 May 2016.

Athlete	Event	Seeding		Quarterfinal		Semifinal		Final	
Athlete	Event	Result	Rank	Points	Rank	Points	Rank	Result	Rank
Alfredo Campo	Men's BMX	36.463	27	28	8	Did not advance			

== Equestrian ==
Ecuador has entered one eventing rider into the Olympic equestrian competition by virtue of a top two finish from a combined group of North, Central, & South America in the individual FEI Olympic rankings.

=== Eventing ===
Athlete	Horse	Event	Dressage		Cross-country			Jumping						Total	
Athlete	Horse	Event	Dressage		Cross-country			Qualifier			Final			Total	
Athlete	Horse	Event	Penalties	Rank	Penalties	Total	Rank	Penalties	Total	Rank	Penalties	Total	Rank	Penalties	Rank
Nicolas Wettstein	Nadeville Merze	Individual	56.00	55	Retired			Did not advance							

== Judo ==
Ecuador has qualified three judokas for each of the following weight classes at the Games. Lenin Preciado and Freddy Figueroa were ranked among the top 22 eligible judokas for men in the IJF World Ranking List of 30 May 2016, while London 2012 Olympian Estefania García at women's half-middleweight (63 kg) earned a continental quota spot from the Pan American region, as Ecuador's top-ranked judoka outside of direct qualifying position.

Athlete	Event	Round of 64	Round of 32	Round of 16	Quarterfinals	Semifinals	Repechage	Final / BM	
Athlete	Event	Opposition Result	Opposition Result	Opposition Result	Opposition Result	Opposition Result	Opposition Result	Opposition Result	Rank
Lenin Preciado	Men's −60 kg	Bye	Chammartin (SUI); L 002–010	Did not advance					
Freddy Figueroa	Men's +100 kg	—N/a	Kim S-m (KOR); L 000–102	Did not advance					
Estefania García	Women's −63 kg	—N/a	Bangoura (GUI); W 100–000	Unterwurzacher (AUT); L 000–010	Did not advance				

== Rowing ==
Ecuador has qualified one boat in the men's single sculls for the Olympics at the 2016 Latin American Continental Qualification Regatta in Valparaíso, Chile, signifying the nation's Olympic sporting debut.

Athlete	Event	Heats		Repechage		Quarterfinals		Semifinals		Final	
Athlete	Event	Time	Rank	Time	Rank	Time	Rank	Time	Rank	Time	Rank
Bryan Sola Zambrano	Men's single sculls	7:48.77	5 R	7:28.30	4 SE/F	Bye		7:52.86	3 FE	7:53.54	28

Qualification Legend: FA=Final A (medal); FB=Final B (non-medal); FC=Final C (non-medal); FD=Final D (non-medal); FE=Final E (non-medal); FF=Final F (non-medal); SA/B=Semifinals A/B; SC/D=Semifinals C/D; SE/F=Semifinals E/F; QF=Quarterfinals; R=Repechage

== Shooting ==
Ecuador has qualified one shooter in the women's pistol events by virtue of her best finish at the American Continental Championships and other selection competitions, as long as she obtained a minimum qualifying score (MQS) by 31 March 2016.

Athlete	Event	Qualification		Semifinal		Final	
Athlete	Event	Points	Rank	Points	Rank	Points	Rank
Andrea Pérez Peña	Women's 25 m pistol	561	37	Did not advance			

Qualification Legend: Q = Qualify for the next round; q = Qualify for the bronze medal (shotgun)

== Swimming ==
Ecuadorian swimmers have so far achieved qualifying standards in the following events (up to a maximum of 2 swimmers in each event at the Olympic Qualifying Time (OQT), and potentially 1 at the Olympic Selection Time (OST)):

Athlete	Event	Heat		Final	
Athlete	Event	Time	Rank	Time	Rank
Esteban Enderica	Men's 1500 m freestyle	15:10.15	23	Did not advance	
Iván Enderica Ochoa	Men's 10 km open water	—N/a		1:53:16.2	16
Samantha Arévalo	Women's 10 km open water	—N/a		1:57:27.2	9

== Triathlon ==
Ecuador has entered one triathlete to compete at the Games. London 2012 Olympian Elizabeth Bravo was selected as the highest-ranked triathlete from the Americas in the women's event based on the ITU Points List.

Athlete	Event	Swim (1.5 km)	Trans 1	Bike (40 km)	Trans 2	Run (10 km)	Total Time	Rank
Elizabeth Bravo	Women's	20:10	0:55	1:05:54	0:44	40:09	2:07:52	47

== Weightlifting ==
Ecuadorian weightlifters have qualified two women's quota places for the Rio Olympics based on their combined team standing by points at the 2014 and 2015 IWF World Championships. A single men's Olympic spot had been added to the Ecuadorian roster by virtue of a top seven national finish at the 2016 Pan American Championships. The team must allocate these places to individual athletes by 20 June 2016.

Athlete	Event	Snatch		Clean & Jerk		Total	Rank
Athlete	Event	Result	Rank	Result	Rank	Total	Rank
Fernando Salas	Men's +105 kg	184	16	221	13	405	14
Alexandra Escobar	Women's −58 kg	100	4	123	4	223	4
Neisi Dájomes	Women's −69 kg	107	6	130	8	237	7

== Wrestling ==
Ecuador has qualified two wrestlers for each of the following weight classes into the Olympic competition. One of them finished in the top two final to book an Olympic spot in the men's Greco-Roman 59 kg at the 2016 Pan American Qualification Tournament, while the other had claimed the remaining Olympic slot in the women's freestyle 58 kg to round out the Ecuadorian roster at the initial meet of the World Qualification Tournament in Ulaanbaatar.

Key:

- VT – Victory by Fall.
- PP – Decision by Points – the loser with technical points.
- PO – Decision by Points – the loser without technical points.
- ST – Decision by points – the loser without technical points and a margin of victory of at least 8 (Greco-Roman) or 10 (freestyle) points.

Men's Greco-Roman

Athlete	Event	Qualification	Round of 16	Quarterfinal	Semifinal	Repechage 1	Repechage 2	Final / BM	
Athlete	Event	Opposition Result	Opposition Result	Opposition Result	Opposition Result	Opposition Result	Opposition Result	Opposition Result	Rank
Andrés Montaño	−59 kg	Bye	Wang Lm (CHN); L 0–4 ^{ST}	Did not advance					17

Women's freestyle

Athlete	Event	Qualification	Round of 16	Quarterfinal	Semifinal	Repechage 1	Repechage 2	Final / BM	
Athlete	Event	Opposition Result	Opposition Result	Opposition Result	Opposition Result	Opposition Result	Opposition Result	Opposition Result	Rank
Lissette Antes	−58 kg	Cherdivara (MDA); L 0–3 ^{PO}	Did not advance						19

== See also ==
- Ecuador at the 2015 Pan American Games
