= Ecuador at the 1992 Summer Olympics =

- IOC code: ECU
- NOC: Ecuadorian National Olympic Committee

in Barcelona
- Competitors: 13 (6 men and 7 women) in 6 sports
- Flag bearer: María Cangá
- Medals: Gold 0 Silver 0 Bronze 0 Total 0

Summer Olympics appearances (overview)
- 1924; 1928–1964; 1968; 1972; 1976; 1980; 1984; 1988; 1992; 1996; 2000; 2004; 2008; 2012; 2016; 2020; 2024

Ecuador competed at the 1992 Summer Olympics in Barcelona, Spain, their seventh consecutive appearance at the Olympics, since first competing at the 1924 Summer Games in Paris. Thirteen competitors, six men and seven women, took part in fifteen events in six sports in the 1992 Games.

== Competitors ==
The following is the list of number of competitors in the Games.

Sport	Men	Women	Total
Athletics	3	4	7
Cycling	2	0	2
Judo	0	1	1
Shooting	1	0	1
Swimming	0	1	1
Table tennis	0	1	1
Total	6	7	13

== Athletics ==
Men's 10.000 metres

- Edy Punina
  - Heat – 30:19.76 (→ did not advance)

Men's Marathon

- Rolando Vera – 2:21.30 (→ 43rd place)

Men's 20 km Walk

- Jefferson Pérez – did not finish (→ no ranking)

Women's 3.000 metres

- Janeth Caizalitín
  - Heat – 9:32.29 (→ did not advance)

Women's 10.000 metres

- Martha Tenorio
  - Heat – 34:29.03 (→ did not advance)

Women's 10 km Walk

- Miriam Ramón
  - Final – 51:56 (→ 36th place)

Women's 400m Hurdles

- Liliana Chalá
  - Heat – 58.55 (→ did not advance)

== Cycling ==
Two male cyclists represented Ecuador in 1992.

Men's road race

- Juan Carlos Rosero

Men's 1 km time trial

- Nelson Mario Pons

== Judo ==
- María Cangá

== Shooting ==
- Hugo Romero

== Swimming ==
Women's 100m Breaststroke

- Priscilla Madero
  - Heat – 1:20.76 (→ did not advance, 40th place)

Women's 200m Breaststroke

- Priscilla Madero
  - Heat – 2:46.79 (→ did not advance, 35th place)

== Table tennis ==
Women's Singles Competition

- María Patricia Cabrera

== See also ==
- Ecuador at the 1991 Pan American Games
