= Ecuador at the 2012 Summer Olympics =

- IOC code: ECU
- NOC: Ecuadorian National Olympic Committee
- Website: www.coe.org.ec (in Spanish)

in London
- Competitors: 36 in 11 sports
- Flag bearer: César de Cesare
- Medals: Gold 0 Silver 0 Bronze 0 Total 0

Summer Olympics appearances (overview)
- 1924; 1928–1964; 1968; 1972; 1976; 1980; 1984; 1988; 1992; 1996; 2000; 2004; 2008; 2012; 2016; 2020; 2024; 2028

Ecuador competed at the 2012 Summer Olympics in London, from 27 July to 12 August 2012. This was the nation's twelfth consecutive appearance at the Olympics. It had first competed at the 1924 Summer Olympics in Paris.

Comité Olímpico Ecuatoriano sent the nation's largest delegation ever to the Games. A total of 36 athletes, 23 men and 13 women, competed in 11 sports; there was only a single competitor in sprint canoeing, equestrian, judo, and shooting. Five Ecuadorian athletes had competed in Beijing, including weightlifter Alexandra Escobar, who was at her third Olympic Games in London. Argentina-born sprint kayaker César de Cesare became the nation's first male flag bearer at the opening ceremony since 1996. Ecuador also made its Olympic debut in women's triathlon.

Ecuador failed to win an Olympic medal for the first time since 2004. Sprinter Álex Quiñónez qualified successfully for the final rounds in the men's 200 metres, but missed out of the nation's first medal in London.

== Athletics ==
Ecuadorian athletes have so far achieved qualifying standards in the following athletics events (up to a maximum of 3 athletes in each event at the 'A' Standard, and 1 at the 'B' Standard):

Key

- Note – Ranks given for track events are within the athlete's heat only
- Q = Qualified for the next round
- q = Qualified for the next round as a fastest loser or, in field events, by position without achieving the qualifying target
- NR = National record
- N/A = Round not applicable for the event
- Bye = Athlete not required to compete in round

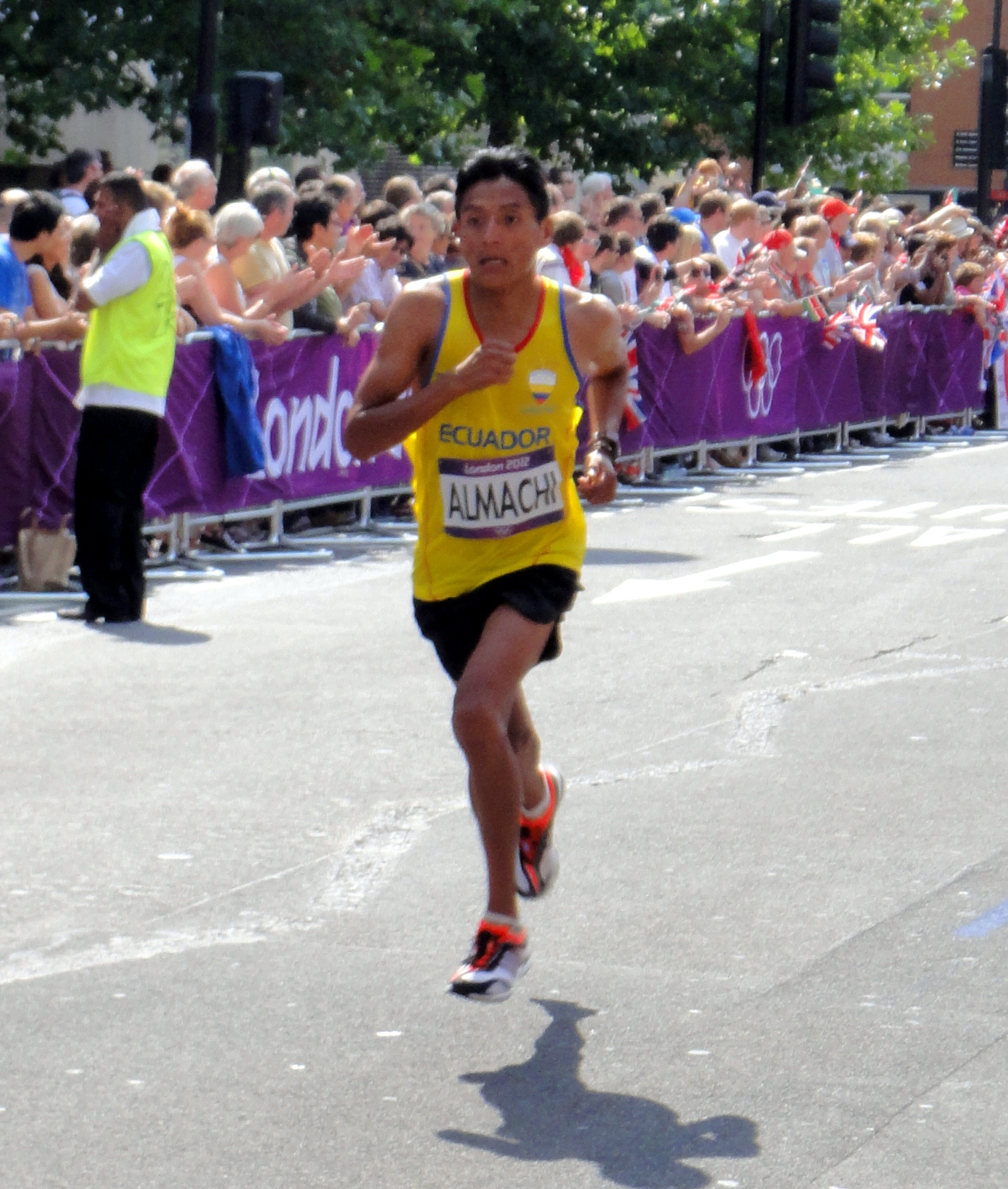
Miguel Almachi finished fiftieth in men's marathon.

Men
Track & road events

Athlete	Event	Heat		Semifinal		Final	
Athlete	Event	Result	Rank	Result	Rank	Result	Rank
Miguel Almachi	Marathon	—N/a				2:19:53	50
Mauricio Arteaga	20 km walk	—N/a				1:25:51	44
Andrés Chocho	50 km walk	—N/a				DSQ	
Xavier Moreno	50 km walk	—N/a				4:09:23	47
Byron Piedra	10000 m	—N/a				DNF	
Álex Quiñónez	200 m	20.28	1 Q	20.37	3 q	20.57	7

Field events

Athlete	Event	Qualification		Final	
Athlete	Event	Distance	Position	Distance	Position
Diego Ferrín	High jump	2.21	21	did not advance	
José Adrián Sornoza	Triple jump	16.04	25	did not advance	

Women
Track & road events

Athlete	Event	Heat		Semifinal		Final	
Athlete	Event	Result	Rank	Result	Rank	Result	Rank
Rosa Chacha	Marathon	—N/a				2:40:57	83
Ericka Chávez	200 m	23.70	7	did not advance			
Yadira Guamán	20 km walk	—N/a				1:34:47	40
Lucy Jaramillo	400 m hurdles	57.74	7	did not advance			
Paola Pérez	20 km walk	—N/a				1:37:05	51

== Boxing ==
Ecuador has qualified boxers for the following events

Men

Athlete	Event	Round of 32	Round of 16	Quarterfinals	Semifinals	Final	
Athlete	Event	Opposition Result	Opposition Result	Opposition Result	Opposition Result	Opposition Result	Rank
Carlos Quipo	Light flyweight	de la Nieve (ESP); W 14–11	Pongprayoon (THA); L 6–10	did not advance			
Anderson Rojas	Light welterweight	Rahmonov (UZB); L 10–16	did not advance				
Carlos Sánchez	Welterweight	Nolan (IRL); L 8–14	did not advance				
Marlo Delgado	Middleweight	Drenovak (SRB); L 12–13	did not advance				
Carlos Góngora	Light heavyweight	Huseynli (AZE); W 9–8	Niyazymbetov (KAZ); L 5–13	did not advance			
Julio Castillo	Heavyweight	—N/a	Karneyeu (BLR); L 12–21	did not advance			
Ítalo Perea	Super heavyweight	—N/a	Cammarelle (ITA); L 10–18	did not advance			

== Canoeing ==
=== Sprint ===
Ecuador has qualified boats for the following events

Athlete	Event	Heats		Semifinals		Final	
Athlete	Event	Time	Rank	Time	Rank	Time	Rank
César de Cesare	Men's K-1 200 m	36.181	5 Q	36.975	4 FB	38.075	12

Qualification Legend: FA = Qualify to final (medal); FB = Qualify to final B (non-medal)

== Cycling ==
=== Road ===
Athlete	Event	Time	Rank
Byron Guamá	Men's road race	OTL	

=== BMX ===
Athlete	Event	Seeding		Quarterfinal		Semifinal		Final	
Athlete	Event	Result	Rank	Points	Rank	Points	Rank	Result	Rank
Emilio Falla	Men's BMX	39.737	24	23	21	did not advance			

== Equestrian ==
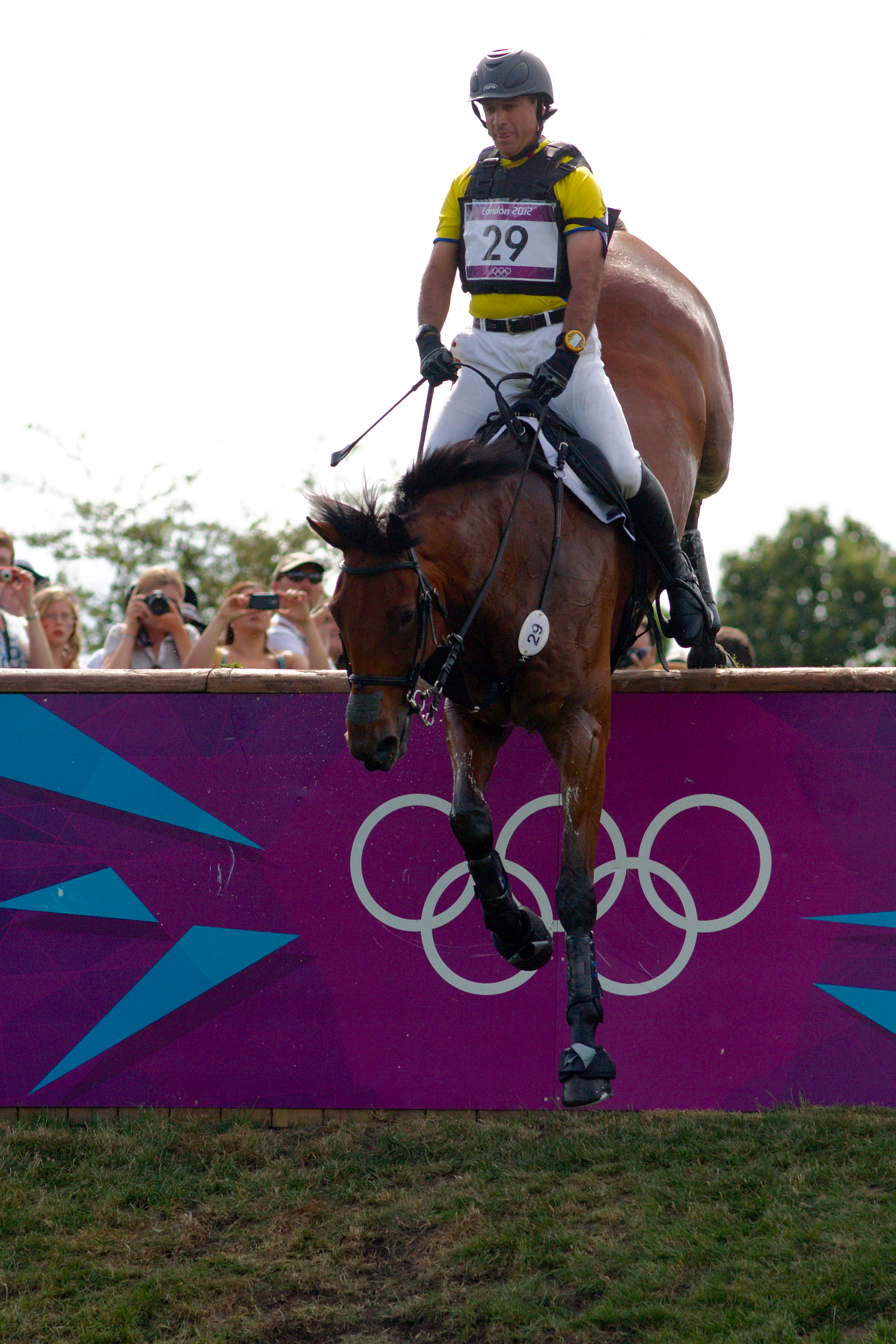
Ronald Zabala and his horse Master Rose in individual eventing.

=== Eventing ===
Athlete	Horse	Event	Dressage		Cross-country			Jumping						Total	
Athlete	Horse	Event	Dressage		Cross-country			Qualifier			Final			Total	
Athlete	Horse	Event	Penalties	Rank	Penalties	Total	Rank	Penalties	Total	Rank	Penalties	Total	Rank	Penalties	Rank
Ronald Zabala	Master Rose	Individual	53.30	46	36.00	89.30	48	7.00	96.30	43	did not advance			96.30	43

== Judo ==
Ecuador has qualified 1 judoka

Athlete	Event	Round of 32	Round of 16	Quarterfinals	Semifinals	Repechage	Final / BM	
Athlete	Event	Opposition Result	Opposition Result	Opposition Result	Opposition Result	Opposition Result	Opposition Result	Rank
Estefania García	Women's −63 kg	Bye	Žolnir (SLO); L 0001–1000	did not advance				

== Shooting ==
Women

Athlete	Event	Qualification		Final	
Athlete	Event	Points	Rank	Points	Rank
Sofía Padilla	10 m air rifle	386	53	did not advance	

== Swimming ==
Men

Athlete	Event	Heat		Final	
Athlete	Event	Time	Rank	Time	Rank
Esteban Enderica Salgado	400 m individual medley	4:24.32	30	did not advance	
Ivan Enderica Ochoa	10 km open water	—N/a		1:52:28.6	21

Women

Athlete	Event	Heat		Final	
Athlete	Event	Time	Rank	Time	Rank
Samantha Arevalo Salinas	800 m freestyle	8:49.21	29	did not advance	

== Triathlon ==
Ecuador has qualified the following athletes.

Athlete	Event	Swim (1.5 km)	Trans 1	Bike (40 km)	Trans 2	Run (10 km)	Total Time	Rank
Elizabeth Bravo	Women's	19:50	0:42	1:10:44	0:32	38:12	2:10:00	49

== Weightlifting ==
Ecuador has qualified 1 man and 3 women.

Athlete	Event	Snatch		Clean & Jerk		Total	Rank
Athlete	Event	Result	Rank	Result	Rank	Total	Rank
Jorge Arroyo	Men's −105 kg	185	3	200	11	385	8
Alexandra Escobar	Women's −58 kg	103	4	123	10	226	7
Rosa Tenorio	Women's −69 kg	95	12	115	11	210	11
Seledina Nieves	Women's +75 kg	117	8	138	9	255	8

== Wrestling ==
Ecuador has qualified in the following events.

Key:

- VT – Victory by Fall.
- PP – Decision by Points – the loser with technical points.
- PO – Decision by Points – the loser without technical points.

Men's Greco-Roman

Athlete	Event	Qualification	Round of 16	Quarterfinal	Semifinal	Repechage 1	Repechage 2	Final / BM	
Athlete	Event	Opposition Result	Opposition Result	Opposition Result	Opposition Result	Opposition Result	Opposition Result	Opposition Result	Rank
Vicente Huacon	−66 kg	Bye	El-Gharably (EGY); L 1–3 ^{PP}	did not advance					12

Women's freestyle

Athlete	Event	Qualification	Round of 16	Quarterfinal	Semifinal	Repechage 1	Repechage 2	Final / BM	
Athlete	Event	Opposition Result	Opposition Result	Opposition Result	Opposition Result	Opposition Result	Opposition Result	Opposition Result	Rank
Lissette Antes	−55 kg	Bye	Butkevych (GBR); W 3–1 ^{PP}	Rentería (COL); L 1–3 ^{PP}	did not advance				9

== See also ==
- Ecuador at the 2011 Pan American Games
