= Ecuador at the 2004 Summer Olympics =

- IOC code: ECU
- NOC: Ecuadorian National Olympic Committee
- Website: www.coe.org.ec (in Spanish)

in Athens
- Competitors: 16 in 7 sports
- Flag bearer: Alexandra Escobar
- Medals: Gold 0 Silver 0 Bronze 0 Total 0

Summer Olympics appearances (overview)
- 1924; 1928–1964; 1968; 1972; 1976; 1980; 1984; 1988; 1992; 1996; 2000; 2004; 2008; 2012; 2016; 2020; 2024

Ecuador was represented at the 2004 Summer Olympics in Athens, Greece by the Ecuadorian National Olympic Committee.

In total, 16 athletes including 11 men and five women represented Ecuador in seven different sports including athletics, boxing, judo, shooting, swimming, tennis and weightlifting.

Athletes in the delegation included race walker Jefferson Pérez, a former Olympic champion at his fourth Olympics, and tennis player Nicolás Lapentti who returned for his second Olympics after an eight-year absence due to injury. Weightlifter and Pan American Games champion Alexandra Escobar was selected to carry the Ecuadorian flag in the opening ceremony.

Ecuador did not win any medals at the games but race walker Jefferson Pérez finished fourth in the men's 20 km walk.

== Competitors ==
In total, 16 athletes represented Ecuador at the 2004 Summer Olympics in Athens, Greece across seven different sports.

| Sport | Men | Women | Total |
|---|---|---|---|
| Athletics | 7 | 1 | 8 |
| Boxling | 1 | – | 1 |
| Judo | 0 | 2 | 2 |
| Shooting | 0 | 1 | 1 |
| Swimming | 1 | 0 | 1 |
| Tennis | 1 | 0 | 1 |
| Weightlifting | 1 | 1 | 2 |
| Total | 11 | 5 | 16 |

== Athletics ==
In total, eight Ecuadorian athletes participated in the athletics events – Silvio Guerra, Xavier Moreno, Jefferson Pérez, Byron Piedra, Jackson Quiñónez, Sandra Ruales, Rolando Saquipay and Franklin Tenorio.

Men

| Athlete | Event | Heat | | Quarterfinal | | Semifinal | | Final | |
| Athlete | Event | Result | Rank | Result | Rank | Result | Rank | Result | Rank |
|---|---|---|---|---|---|---|---|---|---|
| Silvio Guerra | Marathon | — | | | | | | 2:25:29 | 61 |
| Xavier Moreno | 20 km walk | — | | | | | | DSQ | |
| Jefferson Pérez | 20 km walk | — | | | | | | 1:20:38 | 4 |
| Jefferson Pérez | 50 km walk | — | | | | | | 3:53:04 NR | 12 |
| Byron Piedra | 800 m | 1:48.42 | 7 | — | | Did not advance | | | |
| Jackson Quiñónez | 110 m hurdles | 13.44 NR | 3 Q | 13.67 | 7 | Did not advance | | | |
| Rolando Saquipay | 20 km walk | — | | | | | | 1:24:07 | 17 |
| Franklin Tenorio | Marathon | — | | | | | | 2:31:12 | 71 |

Women

| Athlete | Event | Final | |
| Athlete | Event | Result | Rank |
|---|---|---|---|
| Sandra Ruales | Marathon | 2:44:28 | 36 |

== Boxing ==
In total, one Ecuadorian athlete participated in the boxing events – Patricio Calero in the light flyweight category.

| Athlete | Event | Round of 32 | Round of 16 | Quarterfinals | Semifinals | Final | |
| Athlete | Event | Opposition Result | Opposition Result | Opposition Result | Opposition Result | Opposition Result | Rank |
|---|---|---|---|---|---|---|---|
| Patricio Calero | Light flyweight | Kazakov (RUS); L 8–20 | Did not advance | | | | |

== Judo ==
In total, two Ecuadorian athletes participated in the judo events – Carmen Chalá in the women's +78 kg category and Diana Maza in the women's −63 kg category.

| Athlete | Event | Round of 32 | Round of 16 | Quarterfinals | Semifinals | Repechage 1 | Repechage 2 | Repechage 3 | Final / BM | |
| Athlete | Event | Opposition Result | Opposition Result | Opposition Result | Opposition Result | Opposition Result | Opposition Result | Opposition Result | Opposition Result | Rank |
|---|---|---|---|---|---|---|---|---|---|---|
| Diana Maza | Women's −63 kg | Bye | Tanimoto (JPN); L 0000–1000 | Did not advance | | Dhahri (TUN); L 0000–1010 | Did not advance | | | |
| Carmen Chalá | Women's +78 kg | Bye | Köppen (GER); W 0010–0001 | Sun Fm (CHN); L 0000–1000 | Did not advance | Bye | Yahyaoui (TUN); L 0000–0120 | Did not advance | | |

== Shooting ==
In total, one Ecuadorian athlete participated in the shooting events – Carmen Malo in the women's 10 m air pistol and the women's 25 m pistol.

| Athlete | Event | Qualification | | Final | |
| Athlete | Event | Points | Rank | Points | Rank |
|---|---|---|---|---|---|
| Carmen Malo | 10 m air pistol | 365 | 40 | Did not advance | |
| Carmen Malo | 25 m pistol | 536 | 36 | Did not advance | |

== Swimming ==
In total, one Ecuadorian athlete participated in the swimming events – Julio Santos in the men's 50 m freestyle.

| Athlete | Event | Heat | | Semifinal | | Final | |
| Athlete | Event | Time | Rank | Time | Rank | Time | Rank |
|---|---|---|---|---|---|---|---|
| Julio Santos | 50 m freestyle | 23.43 | =43 | Did not advance | | | |

== Tennis ==
In total, one Ecuadorian athlete participated in the tennis events – Nicolás Lapentti in the men's singles.

| Athlete | Event | Round of 64 | Round of 32 | Round of 16 | Quarterfinals | Semifinals | Final / BM | |
| Athlete | Event | Opposition Score | Opposition Score | Opposition Score | Opposition Score | Opposition Score | Opposition Score | Rank |
|---|---|---|---|---|---|---|---|---|
| Nicolás Lapentti | Men's singles | Clément (FRA); L 6–7^{(5–7)}, 2–6 | Did not advance | | | | | |

== Weightlifting ==
In total, two Ecuadorian athletes participated in the weightlifting events – Alexandra Escobar in the Women's −58 kg category and Julio Idrovo in the men's −69 kg category.

| Athlete | Event | Snatch | | Clean & Jerk | | Total | Rank |
| Athlete | Event | Result | Rank | Result | Rank | Total | Rank |
|---|---|---|---|---|---|---|---|
| Julio Idrovo | Men's −69 kg | 140 | 10 | 155 | 12 | 295 | 11 |
| Alexandra Escobar | Women's −58 kg | 95 | =6 | 120 | =7 | 215 | 7 |

== See also ==
- Ecuador at the 2003 Pan American Games
- Ecuador at the 2004 Summer Paralympics
