= Ecuador at the 1976 Summer Olympics =

- IOC code: ECU
- NOC: Ecuadorian National Olympic Committee

in Montreal
- Competitors: 5 in 4 sports
- Flag bearer: Nelson Suárez
- Medals: Gold 0 Silver 0 Bronze 0 Total 0

Summer Olympics appearances (overview)
- 1924; 1928–1964; 1968; 1972; 1976; 1980; 1984; 1988; 1992; 1996; 2000; 2004; 2008; 2012; 2016; 2020; 2024

Ecuador competed at the 1976 Summer Olympics in Montreal, Quebec, Canada. It was the nation's fourth appearance at the Olympics, after its debut in 1924 and missing the Summer Olympics in 1928-1964.

== Results and competitors by event ==
=== Diving ===
- Nelson Suárez

=== Judo ===
- Enrique Del Valle
- Jhonny Mackay

=== Swimming ===
- Jorge Delgado

=== Wrestling ===
- Marco Terán

== Sources ==
- Ecuador Olympic Committee
- Official Olympic Reports
- sports-reference
