= Ecuador at the 1996 Summer Olympics =

- IOC code: ECU
- NOC: Ecuadorian National Olympic Committee
- Website: www.coe.org.ec (in Spanish)

in Atlanta
- Competitors: 19 in 7 sports
- Flag bearer: Felipe Delgado
- Medals Ranked 49th: Gold 1 Silver 0 Bronze 0 Total 1

Summer Olympics appearances (overview)
- 1924; 1928–1964; 1968; 1972; 1976; 1980; 1984; 1988; 1992; 1996; 2000; 2004; 2008; 2012; 2016; 2020; 2024

Ecuador competed at the 1996 Summer Olympics in Atlanta, United States, winning its first Olympic medal when Jefferson Pérez won the gold medal in the men's 20 km walk. This was the nation's eighth consecutive appearance at the Olympics, since it first started competing in the Olympics, at the 1924 Summer Games in Paris.

== Medalists ==
Medal	Name	Sport	Event	Date
Gold	Jefferson Pérez	Athletics	Men's 20 kilometres walk	26 July

== Competitors ==
The following is the list of number of competitors in the Games.

Sport	Men	Women	Total
Athletics	3	1	4
Boxing	2	–	2
Cycling	3	0	3
Sailing	1	0	1
Shooting	0	1	1
Swimming	5	0	5
Tennis	3	0	3
Total	17	2	19

== Athletics ==
Men
Track and road events

Athlete	Event	Heats		Quarterfinal		Semifinal		Final	
Athlete	Event	Result	Rank	Result	Rank	Result	Rank	Result	Rank
Silvio Guerra	10,000 metres	28:30.15	21	—N/a				Did not advance	
Rolando Vera	Marathon	—N/a						2:17:40	22
Jefferson Pérez	20 kilometres walk	—N/a						1:20:07	1st place, gold medalist(s)

Women
Track and road events

Athlete	Event	Heats		Quarterfinal		Semifinal		Final	
Athlete	Event	Result	Rank	Result	Rank	Result	Rank	Result	Rank
Martha Tenorio	Marathon	—N/a						DNF	

== Boxing ==
Athlete	Event	Round of 32	Round of 16	Quarterfinals	Semifinals	Final	
Athlete	Event	Opposition Result	Opposition Result	Opposition Result	Opposition Result	Opposition Result	Rank
Luis Hernández	Welterweight	Lahsen (MAR); L 9–18	Did not advance				
Thompson García	Heavyweight	Kandelaki (GEO); L Retired	Did not advance				

== Cycling ==
=== Road ===
Men

Athlete	Event	Time	Rank
Paulo Caicedo	Road race	DNF	
Héctor Chiles	Road race	DNF	
Pedro Rodríguez	Road race	DNF	

== Sailing ==
Open
Fleet racing

Athlete	Event	Race											Net points	Final rank
Athlete	Event	1	2	3	4	5	6	7	8	9	10	11	Net points	Final rank
Gastón Vedani	Laser	47	44	48	48	~~50~~	~~57~~	36	39	48	50	39	399	50

== Shooting ==
Women

Athlete	Event	Qualification		Final	
Athlete	Event	Points	Rank	Points	Rank
Margarita de Falconí	10 m air pistol	361	39	Did not advance	

== Swimming ==
Men

Athlete	Event	Heats		Final A/B	
Athlete	Event	Time	Rank	Time	Rank
Felipe Delgado	50 m freestyle	23.26	25	Did not advance	
Felipe Delgado	1ß0 m freestyle	51.38	38	Did not advance	
Felipe Delgado	200 m freestyle	1:57.10	40	Did not advance	
Roberto Delgado	100 m butterfly	56.29	44	Did not advance	
Andrés Vasconcellos	200 m butterfly	2:05.98	39	Did not advance	
Felipe Delgado; Roberto Delgado; Julio Santos; Javier Santos	4 × 100 m freestyle relay	3:27.77	15	Did not advance	
Roberto Delgado; Julio Santos; Javier Santos; Andrés Vasconcellos	4 × 200 m freestyle relay	7:54.37	16	Did not advance	

== Tennis ==
Men

Athlete	Event	Round of 64	Round of 32	Round of 16	Quarterfinals	Semifinals	Final	
Athlete	Event	Opposition Result	Opposition Result	Opposition Result	Opposition Result	Opposition Result	Opposition Result	Rank
Nicolás Lapentti	Singles	Olhovskiy (RUS); L 1–6, 6–3, 6–8	Did not advance					
Luis Morejón	Singles	Filippini (URU); L 7–6^{3}, 5–7, 1–6	Did not advance					
Pablo Campana; Nicolás Lapentti	Doubles	—N/a	Carlsen / Fetterlein (DEN); W 6–4, 3–6, 6–3	Novák / Vacek (CZE); L 5–7, 4–6	Did not advance			

== See also ==
- Ecuador at the 1995 Pan American Games
- Ecuador at the Olympics
