= Ecuador at the 1988 Summer Olympics =

- IOC code: ECU
- NOC: Ecuadorian National Olympic Committee

in Seoul
- Competitors: 13 (10 men and 3 women) in 6 sports
- Flag bearer: Liliana Chalá
- Medals: Gold 0 Silver 0 Bronze 0 Total 0

Summer Olympics appearances (overview)
- 1924; 1928–1964; 1968; 1972; 1976; 1980; 1984; 1988; 1992; 1996; 2000; 2004; 2008; 2012; 2016; 2020; 2024

Ecuador competed at the 1988 Summer Olympics in Seoul, South Korea. This was the nation's sixth Olympics appearance, since it first competed at the 1924 Summer Games in Paris. Thirteen competitors, ten men and three women, took part in fifteen events in six sports.

== Competitors ==
The following is the list of number of competitors in the Games.

Sport	Men	Women	Total
Athletics	3	2	5
Boxing	1	–	1
Cycling	1	0	1
Diving	1	0	1
Shooting	1	1	2
Weightlifting	3	–	3
Total	10	3	13

== Athletics ==
Men
Track and road events

Athlete	Event	Heat		Final	
Athlete	Event	Time	Rank	Time	Rank
Rolando Vera	10,000 metres	28:17.88	10 q	28:17.64	15

Field events

Athlete	Event	Qualification		Final	
Athlete	Event	Distance	Position	Distance	Position
José Quiñaliza	Triple jump	15.86	25	Did not advance	

Combined events – Decathlon

Athlete	Event	100 m	LJ	SP	HJ	400 m	110H	DT	PV	JT	1500 m	Final	Rank
Fidel Solórzano	Result	11.01	6.79	11.76	1.88	DNF							
Fidel Solórzano	Points	858	764	592	696	DNF							

Women
Track and road events

Athlete	Event	Heat Round 1		Heat Round 2		Semifinal		Final	
Athlete	Event	Time	Rank	Time	Rank	Time	Rank	Time	Rank
Liliana Chalá	400 metres	53.74	31 Q	53.83	29	Did not advance			
Nancy Vallecilla	100 metres hurdles	13.97	28	Did not advance					
Liliana Chalá	400 metres hurdöes	57.15	23	—N/a		Did not advance			

== Boxing ==
Athlete	Event	Round of 64	Round of 32	Round of 16	Quarterfinals	Semifinals	Final	
Athlete	Event	Opposition Result	Opposition Result	Opposition Result	Opposition Result	Opposition Result	Opposition Result	Rank
Segundo Mercado	Light middleweight	Quaye (GHA); W KO	Banko (ZAI); W 5–0	Kitel (SWE); L 2–3	Did not advance			

== Cycling ==
One male cyclist represented Ecuador in 1988.

=== Track ===
Sprint

Athlete	Event	Qualification		Round 1	Repechage 1	Round 2	Repechage 2	Quarterfinals	Semifinals	Final	
Athlete	Event	Time Speed (km/h)	Rank	Opposition Time Speed (km/h)	Opposition Time Speed (km/h)	Opposition Time Speed (km/h)	Opposition Time Speed (km/h)	Opposition Time Speed (km/h)	Opposition Time Speed (km/h)	Opposition Time Speed (km/h)	Rank
Nelson Mario Pons	Men's sprint	11.339	18	Neiwand (AUS), Faris (ARG); L	Weber (FRG). Becerra (BOL), Abrams (GUY); L	Did not advance					

Time trial

Athlete	Event	Time	Rank
Nelson Mario Pons	Time trial	1:08.351	19

== Diving ==
Men

Athlete	Event	Qualification		Final	
Athlete	Event	Points	Rank	Points	Rank
Abraham Suárez	3 metre springboard	446.82	30	Did not advance	

== Shooting ==
Men

Athlete	Event	Qualification		Final	
Athlete	Event	Points	Rank	Points	Rank
Hugo Romero	10 m air rifle	572	45	Did not advance	

Women

Athlete	Event	Qualification		Final	
Athlete	Event	Points	Rank	Points	Rank
Inés Margraff	10 m air pistol	351	37	Did not advance	

== Weightlifting ==
Athlete	Event	Snatch		Clean & jerk		Total	Rank
Athlete	Event	Result	Rank	Result	Rank	Total	Rank
Edwin Mata	56 kg	92.5	20	125.0	19	217.5	20
José García	60 kg	105.0	12	NM		DNF	
Jhon Sichel	82.5 kg	125.0	17	157.5	15	282.5	15
