= Ecuador at the 1984 Summer Olympics =

- IOC code: ECU
- NOC: Ecuadorian National Olympic Committee

in Los Angeles
- Competitors: 11 in 6 sports
- Flag bearer: Héctor Hurtado
- Medals: Gold 0 Silver 0 Bronze 0 Total 0

Summer Olympics appearances (overview)
- 1924; 1928–1964; 1968; 1972; 1976; 1980; 1984; 1988; 1992; 1996; 2000; 2004; 2008; 2012; 2016; 2020; 2024

Ecuador competed at the 1984 Summer Olympics in Los Angeles, United States, with 11 competitors representing their nation in six sports.

== Results by event ==
=== Athletics ===
Men's 800 metres

- Leopoldo Acosta
  - Heat — 1:54.06 (→ did not advance)

Men's 5,000 metres

- Luis Tipán
  - Heat — 14:52.43 (→ did not advance)

Men's 10,000 metres

- Luis Tipán
  - Heat — 30:07.49 (→ did not advance)

Men's Long Jump

- Fidel Solórzano
  - Qualification — 6.93m (→ did not advance, 24th place)

Men's Decathlon

- Fidel Solórzano
  - Final Result — 6519 points (→ 23rd place)

=== Equestrian ===
- Brigitte Morillo

=== Judo ===
- Jimmy Arévalo

=== Shooting ===
- Ronald Dunn
- Paúl Margraff
- Galo Miño
- Hugo Romero

=== Weightlifting ===
- Héctor Hurtado

=== Wrestling ===
- Iván Garcés
