= Ecuador at the 2008 Summer Olympics =

- IOC code: ECU
- NOC: Ecuadorian National Olympic Committee
- Website: www.coe.org.ec (in Spanish)

in Beijing
- Competitors: 25 in 9 sports
- Flag bearer: Alexandra Escobar
- Medals Ranked 70th: Gold 0 Silver 1 Bronze 0 Total 1

Summer Olympics appearances (overview)
- 1924; 1928–1964; 1968; 1972; 1976; 1980; 1984; 1988; 1992; 1996; 2000; 2004; 2008; 2012; 2016; 2020; 2024; 2028

Ecuador competed in the 2008 Summer Olympics, held in Beijing, People's Republic of China from August 8 to August 24, 2008. This was the nation's eleventh consecutive appearance at the Olympics since it first competed at the 1924 Summer Olympics in Paris

As of July 1, 2008, 25 Ecuadorians had qualified to compete in nine sports.

== Medalists ==
Medal	Name	Sport	Event
Silver	Jefferson Pérez	Athletics	Men's 20 km walk

== Athletics ==
Key

- Note–Ranks given for track events are within the athlete's heat only
- Q = Qualified for the next round
- q = Qualified for the next round as a fastest loser or, in field events, by position without achieving the qualifying target
- NR = National record
- N/A = Round not applicable for the event
- Bye = Athlete not required to compete in round

Men
Track & road events

Athlete	Event	Heat		Quarterfinal		Semifinal		Final	
Athlete	Event	Result	Rank	Result	Rank	Result	Rank	Result	Rank
Andrés Chocho	20 km walk	—N/a						1:27:09	38
Xavier Moreno	50 km walk	—N/a						4:07:04	36
Franklin Nazareno	100 m	10.60	5	Did not advance					
Franklin Nazareno	200 m	21.26	8	Did not advance					
Jefferson Pérez	20 km walk	—N/a						1:19:15	2nd place, silver medalist(s)
Byron Piedra	1500 m	3:45.57	12	—N/a		Did not advance			
Fausto Quinde	50 km walk	—N/a						3:59:28	25
Rolando Saquipay	20 km walk	—N/a						1:22:32	20
Franklin Tenorio	Marathon	—N/a						2:29:05	65

Field events

Athlete	Event	Qualification		Final	
Athlete	Event	Distance	Position	Distance	Position
Hugo Chila	Long jump	7.77	24	Did not advance	

Women
Track & road events

Athlete	Event	Final	
Athlete	Event	Result	Rank
Johana Ordóñez	20 km walk	1:36:26	36
Sandra Ruales	Marathon	2:35:53	43

== Boxing ==
Ecuador qualified three boxers for the Olympic boxing tournament. All three qualified at the first American qualifying tournament.

Athlete	Event	Round of 32	Round of 16	Quarterfinals	Semifinals	Final	
Athlete	Event	Opposition Result	Opposition Result	Opposition Result	Opposition Result	Opposition Result	Rank
José Luis Meza	Light flyweight	Bye	Barnes (IRL); L 8–14	Did not advance			
Carlos Góngora	Middleweight	Buga (GER); W 14–7	Gazis (GRE); W 12–1	Kumar (IND); L 4–9	Did not advance		
Luis Enrique Porozo	Featherweight	Navarro (DOM); W 3^{+}–3	Li Y (CHN); L 5–6	Did not advance			

== Cycling ==
=== BMX ===
Athlete	Event	Seeding		Quarterfinal		Semifinal		Final	
Athlete	Event	Result	Rank	Points	Rank	Points	Rank	Result	Rank
Emilio Falla	Men's BMX	36.993	25	17	6	Did not advance			

== Judo ==
Athlete	Event	Preliminary	Round of 32	Round of 16	Quarterfinals	Semifinals	Repechage 1	Repechage 2	Repechage 3	Final / BM	
Athlete	Event	Opposition Result	Opposition Result	Opposition Result	Opposition Result	Opposition Result	Opposition Result	Opposition Result	Opposition Result	Opposition Result	Rank
Roberto Ibáñez	Men's −66 kg	Bye	Mehmedovic (CAN); L 0010–0011	Did not advance							
Glenda Miranda	Women's −48 kg	—N/a	Bermoy (CUB); L 0000–0001	Did not advance			Bogdanova (RUS); L 0000–1000	Did not advance			
Carmen Chalá	Women's +78 kg	—N/a	Chikhrouhou (TUN); L 0000–1000	Did not advance							

== Shooting ==
Women

Athlete	Event	Qualification		Final	
Athlete	Event	Points	Rank	Points	Rank
Carmen Malo	25 m pistol	559	40	Did not advance	

== Swimming ==
Men

Athlete	Event	Heat		Semifinal		Final	
Athlete	Event	Time	Rank	Time	Rank	Time	Rank
Marco Camargo	100 m butterfly	57.48	65	Did not advance			

Women

Athlete	Event	Heat		Semifinal		Final	
Athlete	Event	Time	Rank	Time	Rank	Time	Rank
Yamilé Bahamonde	50 m freestyle	26.54	=44	Did not advance			

== Taekwondo ==
Athlete	Event	Round of 16	Quarterfinals	Semifinals	Repechage	Bronze medal	Final	
Athlete	Event	Opposition Result	Opposition Result	Opposition Result	Opposition Result	Opposition Result	Opposition Result	Rank
Lorena Benítes	Women's +67 kg	Marton (AUS); L 0–2	Did not advance					

== Tennis ==
Athlete	Event	Round of 64	Round of 32	Round of 16	Quarterfinals	Semifinals	Final	
Athlete	Event	Opposition Score	Opposition Score	Opposition Score	Opposition Score	Opposition Score	Opposition Score	Rank
Nicolás Lapentti	Men's singles	Mathieu (FRA); L 6–7^{(4–7)}, 2–6	Did not advance					

== Weightlifting ==
Athlete	Event	Snatch		Clean & Jerk		Total	Rank
Athlete	Event	Result	Rank	Result	Rank	Total	Rank
Eduardo Guadamud	Men's −94 kg	165	15	~~206~~	DNF	165	DNF
Alexandra Escobar	Women's −58 kg	99	2	124	5	223	4

== See also ==
- Ecuador at the 2007 Pan American Games
