= Fernando González (swimmer) =

Ecuadorian swimmer

Personal information
- Born: 26 August 1950 (age 75) Guayaquil, Ecuador

Sport
- Sport: Swimming

Fernando González (born 26 August 1950) is an Ecuadorian former swimmer. He competed in three events at the 1968 Summer Olympics.

Olympic Games
Preceded by Alberto Jurado	Flag bearer for Ecuador; Mexico 1968	Succeeded by Abdalá Bucaram
