= Ecuador at the 1924 Summer Olympics =

- IOC code: ECU
- NOC: Ecuadorian National Olympic Committee

in Paris
- Competitors: 3 in 1 sport
- Flag bearer: Alberto Jurado
- Medals: Gold 0 Silver 0 Bronze 0 Total 0

Summer Olympics appearances (overview)
- 1924; 1928–1964; 1968; 1972; 1976; 1980; 1984; 1988; 1992; 1996; 2000; 2004; 2008; 2012; 2016; 2020; 2024; 2028

Ecuador at the 1924 Summer Olympics in Paris, France was the first appearance of the nation at the seventh edition of the 1924 Summer Olympics. An all-male national team of three athletes represented the nation at the 1924 Summer Olympics in four events all in athletics.

== Athletics ==
Three athletes represented Ecuador in 1924. It was the nation's debut appearance in the sport as well as the Games.

Ranks given are within the heat.

Athlete	Event	Heats		Quarterfinals		Semifinals		Final	
Athlete	Event	Result	Rank	Result	Rank	Result	Rank	Result	Rank
Alberto Jarrín Jaramillo	10000 m	N/A				did not finish		did not advance	
Alberto Jurado	100 m	Unknown	5	did not advance					
Alberto Jurado	Long jump	N/A				5.68	7	did not advance	
Belisario Villacís	Marathon	N/A						did not finish	

== Sources ==
- Ecuador Olympic Committee
- Official Olympic Reports
- sports-reference
