= Ecuador at the 1972 Summer Olympics =

- IOC code: ECU
- NOC: Ecuadorian National Olympic Committee

in Munich
- Competitors: 3 in 3 sports
- Flag bearer: Abdalá Bucaram
- Medals: Gold 0 Silver 0 Bronze 0 Total 0

Summer Olympics appearances (overview)
- 1924; 1928–1964; 1968; 1972; 1976; 1980; 1984; 1988; 1992; 1996; 2000; 2004; 2008; 2012; 2016; 2020; 2024

Ecuador at the 1972 Summer Olympics in Munich, West Germany was the nation's second appearance by a national team under the auspices of the Ecuadorian National Olympic Committee representing Ecuador.

== Results and competitors by event ==
=== Athletics ===
- Abdalá Bucaram - Did not start due to injury

=== Boxing ===
Men's Flyweight (– 51 kg)

- Jorge Mejía
  - First Round — Lost to Douglas Rodríguez (CUB), 0:5

=== Swimming ===
- Jorge Delgado
