= Ecuador at the Olympics =

- IOC code: ECU
- NOC: Ecuadorian National Olympic Committee
- Website: www.coe.org.ec (in Spanish)
- Medals Ranked 76th: Gold 4 Silver 4 Bronze 2 Total 10

Summer appearances
- 1924; 1928–1964; 1968; 1972; 1976; 1980; 1984; 1988; 1992; 1996; 2000; 2004; 2008; 2012; 2016; 2020; 2024; 2028

Winter appearances
- 2018; 2022; 2026

Ecuador has competed in 16 Summer Olympic Games since 1924. The nation won its first medal when Jefferson Pérez won the gold medal in the men's 20 km walk at the 1996 Olympic Games. The Ecuadorian National Olympic Committee was created in 1948 and recognized by the IOC in 1959.

The nation has participated at the Winter Olympic Games since its debut in 2018.

== Medal tables ==
=== Medals by Summer Games ===
Games	Athletes	Gold	Silver	Bronze	Total	Rank
(France) 1924 Paris	3	0	0	0	0	–
1928–1964	did not participate					
1968 Mexico City	15	0	0	0	0	–
(West Germany) 1972 Munich	3	0	0	0	0	–
(Canada) 1976 Montreal	5	0	0	0	0	–
(Soviet Union) 1980 Moscow	13	0	0	0	0	–
(United States) 1984 Los Angeles	11	0	0	0	0	–
(South Korea) 1988 Seoul	13	0	0	0	0	–
(Spain) 1992 Barcelona	13	0	0	0	0	–
(United States) 1996 Atlanta	19	1	0	0	1	49
(Australia) 2000 Sydney	10	0	0	0	0	–
(Greece) 2004 Athens	17	0	0	0	0	–
(China) 2008 Beijing	25	0	1	0	1	70
(United Kingdom) 2012 London	36	0	0	0	0	–
(Brazil) 2016 Rio de Janeiro	38	0	0	0	0	–
(Japan) 2020 Tokyo	48	2	1	0	3	38
(France) 2024 Paris	40	1	2	2	5	49
(United States) 2028 Los Angeles	future event					
(Australia) 2032 Brisbane	future event					
Total		4	4	2	10	76

=== Medals by Winter Games ===
Games	Athletes	Gold	Silver	Bronze	Total	Rank
(South Korea) 2018 Pyeongchang	1	0	0	0	0	–
(China) 2022 Beijing	1	0	0	0	0	–
(Italy) 2026 Milano Cortina	1	0	0	0	0	–
(France) 2030 French Alps	future event					
(United States) 2034 Utah	future event					
Total		0	0	0	0	–

=== Medals by summer sport ===
Sports	Gold	Silver	Bronze	Total	Rank
Athletics	2	2	0	4	53
Weightlifting	1	1	2	4	40
Cycling	1	0	0	1	33
Wrestling	0	1	0	1	54
Total	4	4	2	10	76

=== Medals by Gender ===
Gender	Gold	Silver	Bronze	Total
Men	3	1	0	4
Women	1	2	2	5
Mixed	0	1	0	1
Total	4	4	2	10

== List of medalists ==
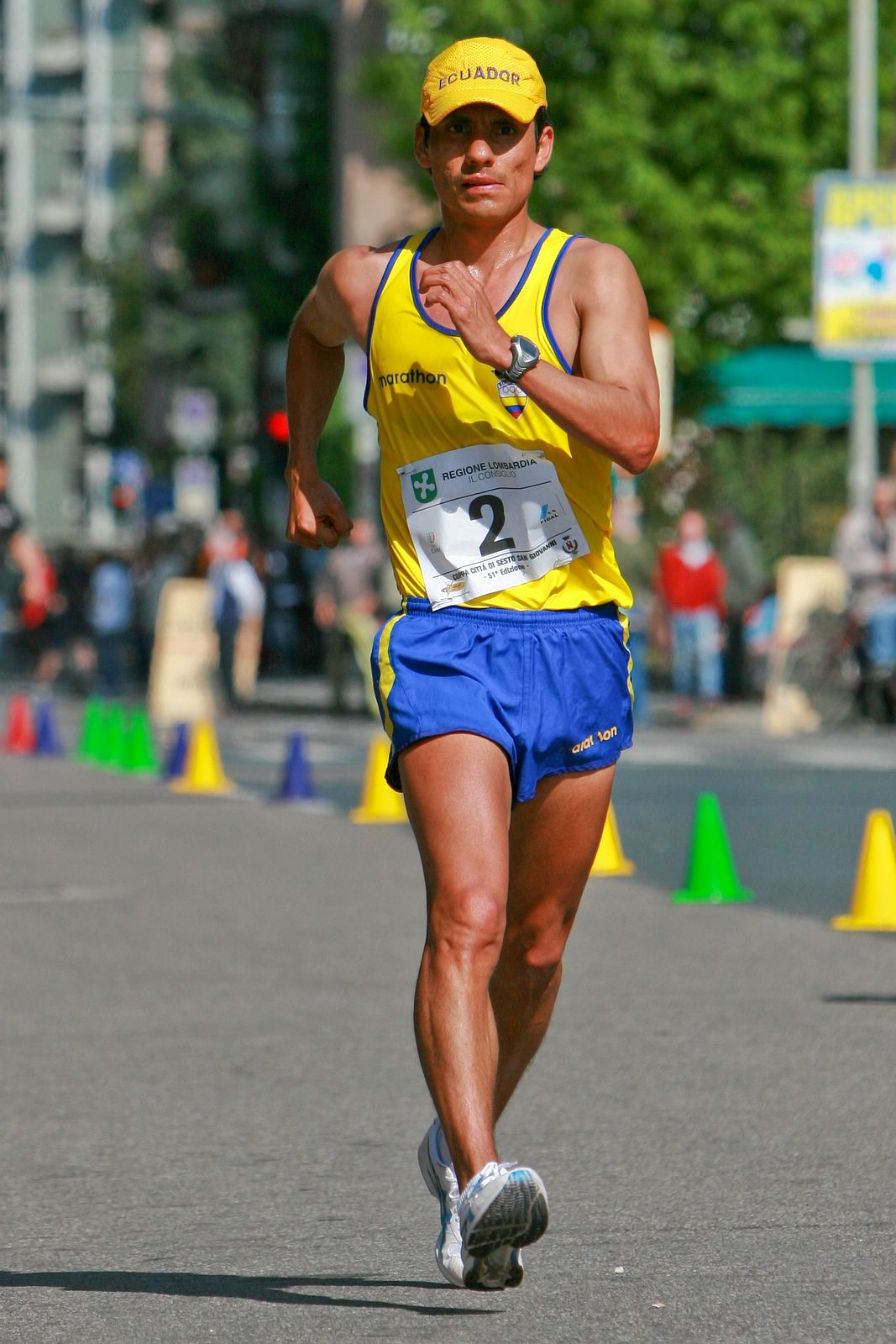
Jefferson Perez in action in Sesto San Giovanni (Italy)

Medal	Name	Games	Sport	Event
Gold	Jefferson Pérez	(United States) 1996 Atlanta	Athletics	Men's 20 kilometres walk
Silver	Jefferson Pérez	(China) 2008 Beijing	Athletics	Men's 20 kilometres walk
Gold	Richard Carapaz	(Japan) 2020 Tokyo	Cycling	Men's road race
Gold	Neisi Dajomes	(Japan) 2020 Tokyo	Weightlifting	Women's 76 kg
Silver	Tamara Salazar	(Japan) 2020 Tokyo	Weightlifting	Women's 87 kg
Gold	Brian Pintado	(France) 2024 Paris	Athletics	Men's 20 kilometres walk
Silver	Brian Pintado; Glenda Morejón	(France) 2024 Paris	Athletics	Mixed marathon walk relay
Silver	Lucía Yépez	(France) 2024 Paris	Wrestling	Women's freestyle 53 kg
Bronze	Angie Palacios	(France) 2024 Paris	Weightlifting	Women's 71 kg
Bronze	Neisi Dájomes	(France) 2024 Paris	Weightlifting	Women's 81 kg

=== Multiple medalists ===
Athlete	Sport	Games	Gold	Silver	Bronze	Total
Jefferson Pérez	Athletics	1996, 2008	1	1	0	2
Brian Pintado	Athletics	2024	1	1	0	2
Neisi Dájomes	Weightlifting	2020, 2024	1	0	1	2

== See also ==
- List of flag bearers for Ecuador at the Olympics
- Ecuador at the Paralympics
