= El Pozo =

El Pozo may refer to:

- El Pozo, Sinaloa, a town in Sinaloa, Mexico
- El Pozo railway station, a Cercanías station in Madrid, Spain
- El pozo (novel), a Uruguayan novel by Juan Carlos Onetti
- ElPozo, a multinational Spanish food processing company
- ElPozo Murcia FS, a Spanish futsal club

== See also ==
- Pozo
