= Héctor Hurtado (weightlifter) =

Ecuadorian weightlifter

Personal information
- Nationality: Ecuadorian
- Born: 11 September 1955 (age 69)

Sport
- Sport: Weightlifting

Héctor Hurtado (born 11 September 1955) is an Ecuadorian weightlifter. He competed in the men's featherweight event at the 1984 Summer Olympics.

Olympic Games
Preceded by Nancy Vallecilla	Flag bearer for Ecuador; Los Angeles 1984	Succeeded by Liliana Chalá
