= Sandro Pozo Vera =

Cuban chess grandmaster (born 1987)

Personal information
- Born: July 27, 1987 (age 38) Santa Clara, Cuba

Chess career
- Country: Cuba
- Title: Grandmaster (2012)
- Peak rating: 2495 (November 2011)

Sandro Pozo Vera is a Cuban chess grandmaster.

== Chess career ==
In March 2011, he played for the Lleida Team in the Honor Division of the Chess Tournament.

In July 2016, he was one of two Cubans who played in the World Chess Open, finishing 42nd with a score of 5.5/9.

In October 2016, he played a blitz match against fellow Cuban grandmaster Renier González during an event held by Champions Chess LLC.

In July 2017, he played in the Southern Open in Florida, where he tied for second with Leon Oquendo.
