= Enrique Ledesma =

Ecuadorian swimmer (born 1958)

Personal information
- Nationality: Ecuador
- Born: 2 September 1958 (age 68)
- Height: 171 cm (5 ft 7 in)
- Weight: 65 kg (143 lb)

Sport
- Sport: Swimming
Medal record
Representing Ecuador
Men's swimming
South American Championships
Gold medal – first place	1978 Guayaquil	100 m butterfly
Gold medal – first place	1980 Buenos Aires	100 m butterfly
Gold medal – first place	1982 La Paz	100 m butterfly

Enrique Ledesma (born 2 September 1958) is an Ecuadorian swimmer.

== Sports career ==
Ledesma became South American Champion in the 100 meters butterfly in 1978, 1980 and 1982. He competed in two events at the 1980 Summer Olympics.

== Post-swimming career ==
Ledesma studied at Louisiana State University and earned a bachelor's degree in Civil Engineering. He continued at the University of Reading in the United Kingdom and earned a master's degree in Construction Project Management. Ledesma was the founder of the project management institute (PMI) Capítulo Ecuador and was its director from 2006 to 2014. He later became director of Proyectum Ecuador.
