= Esteban Espinosa =

Ecuadorian cyclist

Personal information
- Born: 19 February 1962 (age 64)

Cycling career
- Sport: Cycling

Esteban Espinosa (born 19 February 1962) is an Ecuadorian former cyclist. He competed in the 1000m time trial and team pursuit events at the 1980 Summer Olympics.
