= Nelson Suárez =

Ecuadorian diver

Personal information
- Nationality: Ecuadorian
- Born: 7 October 1956 (age 68)

Sport
- Sport: Diving

Nelson Suárez (born 7 October 1956) is an Ecuadorian diver. He competed in the men's 10 metre platform event at the 1976 Summer Olympics.

Olympic Games
Preceded by Abdalá Bucaram	Flag bearer for Ecuador; Montreal 1976	Succeeded by Nancy Vallecilla
