= Alberto Jurado =

Ecuadorian athlete

Personal information
- Full name: Alberto Santiago Jurado González
- Nationality: Ecuadorian
- Born: 24 May 1902 Guayaquil, Ecuador
- Died: 10 August 1984 (aged 82) Guayaquil, Ecuador

Sport
- Sport: Track and field
- Events: 100 metres, long jump

Alberto Santiago Jurado González (24 May 1902 – 10 August 1984) was an Ecuadorian sprinter and long jumper. Born in Guayaquil, he was selected to compete for Ecuador at the 1924 Summer Olympics on their debut appearance, also becoming the flag bearer during the opening ceremony. He competed in the men's 100 metres and the long jump but did not win a medal in either event.

== Biography ==
Alberto Santiago Jurado González was born on 24 May 1902 in Guayaquil, Ecuador. In his international sporting career as a sprinter, he was selected to compete for Ecuador at the 1924 Summer Olympics held in Paris, France, for the nation's first appearance at the Olympic Games. For the Games' opening ceremony, Jurado was selected to be the Ecuador's first flag bearer at the Olympic Games.

Jurado first competed in the preliminary heats of the men's 100 metres on 6 July 1924. He competed in the first preliminary heat against four other athletes, namely: Mariano Aguilar, Loren Murchison, Arthur Porritt, and Camilo Rivas. Jurado placed last in the preliminary heat and recorded a time not fast enough to progress to the quarterfinals held in the same day. Murchison and Porritt advanced further. Jurado then competed in the qualifying round of the men's long jump on 8 July 1924. He competed in Group B against seven other athletes. In the qualifying round, his furthest jump was recorded at a distance of 5.680 metres (18.64 ft). He placed seventh in his group and 29th overall out of the 34 athletes that competed, failing to advance to the finals of the event, as only the top six and those tied within those placements would qualify. Jurado later died on 10 August 1984 in Guayaquil at the age of 82.
