= Mauricio Pozo =

Mauricio Pozo may refer to:

- Mauricio Pozo Crespo (born 1959), Ecuadorian economist and politician
- Mauricio Pozo Quinteros (born 1970), Chilean football manager
