= María Cangá =

Ecuadorian judoka (1962–2023)

Personal information
- Born: 27 September 1962
- Died: 9 August 2023 (aged 60)
Medal record
Women's Judo
Representing Ecuador
Pan American Games
Silver medal – second place	1991 Havana	Half-Middleweight
Bronze medal – third place	1987 Indianapolis	Half-Heavyweight

María Magda Cangá Valencia (27 September 1962 – 9 August 2023) was an Ecuadorian female judoka. She competed for her native country at the 1992 Summer Olympics in Barcelona, Spain, where she was defeated in the first round and carried the national flag at the opening ceremony. Cangá won the silver medal in the Women's Half Heavyweight (– 72 kg) division at the 1991 Pan American Games in Havana, Cuba, after having gained bronze four years earlier in Indianapolis.

Cangá died on 9 August 2023, at the age of 60.

== Sources ==
- sports-reference

Olympic Games
Preceded by Liliana Chalá	Flag bearer for Ecuador; Barcelona 1992	Succeeded by Felipe Delgado
