= Noé Medina =

Ecuadorian cyclist

Personal information
- Born: 20 May 1943 (age 83) Ambato, Ecuador

Cycling career
- Sport: Cycling

Noé Medina (born 20 May 1943) is a former Ecuadorian cyclist. He competed in the individual road race and the team time trial events at the 1968 Summer Olympics in Mexico City.

Medina was born in Ambato, Ecuador.
