= Victor Morales (cyclist) =

Ecuadorian cyclist

Personal information
- Born: 1 November 1943 (age 82) Ambato, Ecuador

Cycling career
- Sport: Cycling

Victor Morales (born 1 November 1943) is a former Ecuadorian cyclist. He competed in the individual road race and the team time trial events at the 1968 Summer Olympics.
