= Arnulfo Pozo =

Ecuadorian cyclist

Personal information
- Born: 27 November 1945 (age 80) Tulcán, Ecuador

Cycling career
- Sport: Cycling

Arnulfo Pozo (born 27 November 1945) is an Ecuadorian former cyclist. He competed in the individual road race and the team time trial events at the 1968 Summer Olympics.
