= Ronald Zabala-Goetschel =

Ecuadorian equestrian

Ronald Zabala
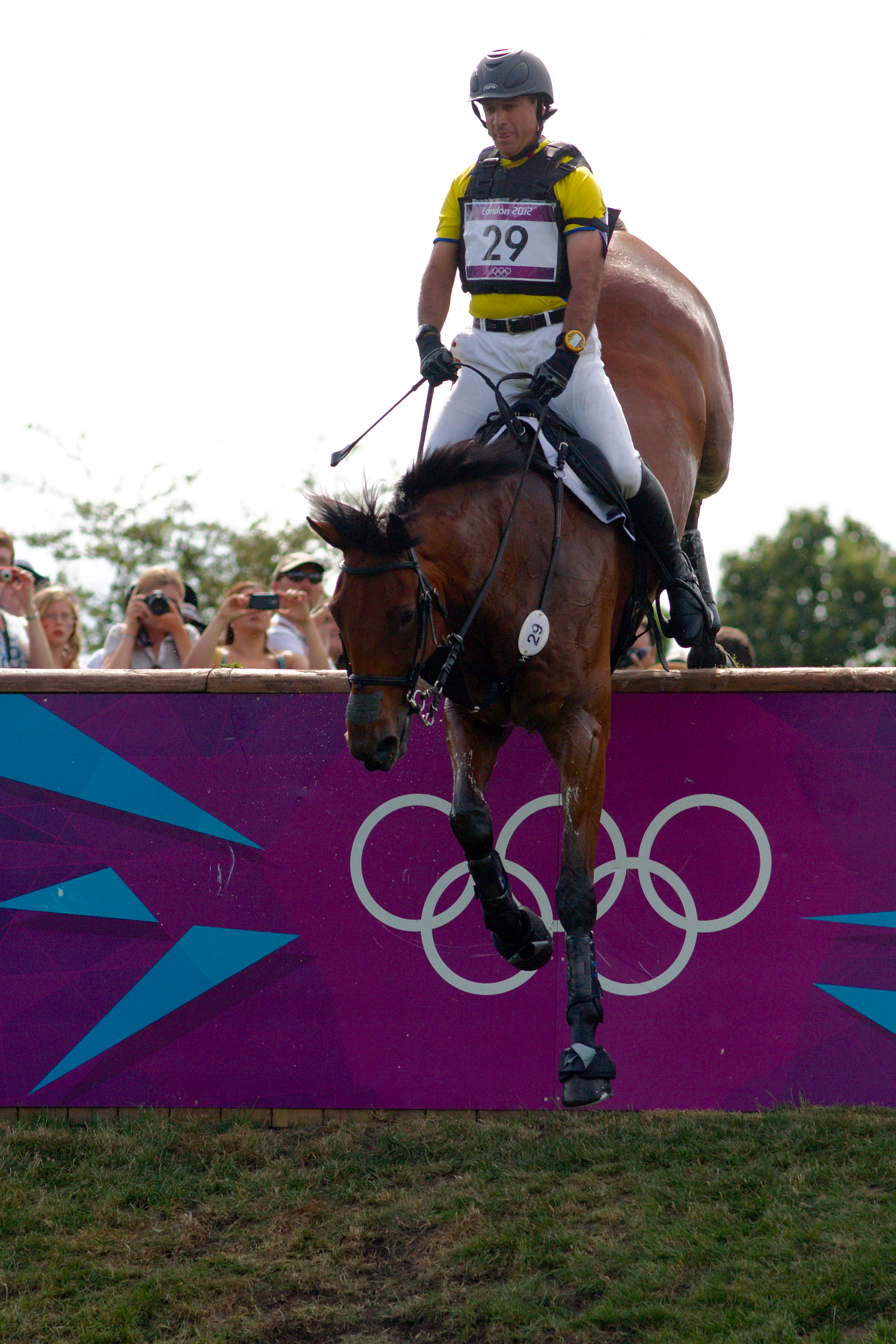
- Zabala and Master Rose competing at the 2012 Summer Olympics

Personal information
- Full name: Ronald Efraín Zabala Goetschel
- Born: 26 September 1966 (age 59); Quito, Ecuador
- Height: 170 cm (5 ft 7 in)
Medal record
Bolivarian Games
Gold medal – first place	2013 Trujillo	Team eventing
Silver medal – second place	2013 Trujillo	Individual eventing
Bronze medal – third place	2025 Lima	Individual eventing

Ronald Efraín Zabala Goetschel (Note: In this Spanish name, the first or paternal surname is Zabala and the second or maternal family name is Goetschel.) (born 26 September 1966 in Quito) is an Ecuadorian equestrian. At the 2012 Summer Olympics he competed in the Individual eventing.

He also competed at the 2015 Pan American Games.

In 2024, he and Forever Young Wundermaske were selected to ride for Ecuador at the 2024 Summer Olympics in Paris. Forever Young Wundermaske would make his Olympic debut at 21 years old, becoming the oldest horse to compete at an Olympic Games.

After scoring 37.70 penalties in their dressage test, Zabala-Goetschel fell in the water jump on cross country and was eliminated from the competition.
