= Nancy Vallecilla =

Ecuadorian athlete

Personal information
- Born: November 24, 1957 (age 68)

Sport
- Country: Ecuador
- Sport: Women's athletics

Achievements and titles
- Olympic finals: 1980 Summer Olympics; 1988 Summer Olympics
Medal record
Women's athletics
Representing Ecuador
South American Games
Gold medal – first place	1978 La Paz	100 m hurdles
Gold medal – first place	1978 La Paz	Pentathlon
Silver medal – second place	1978 La Paz	400 m
Bronze medal – third place	1978 La Paz	Long jump
Bolivarian Games
Gold medal – first place	1977 La Paz	Long jump
Gold medal – first place	1977 La Paz	Pentathlon
Gold medal – first place	1981 Barquisimeto	100 m hurdles
Gold medal – first place	1981 Barquisimeto	Heptathlon
Gold medal – first place	1989 Maracaibo	100 m hurdles
Gold medal – first place	1989 Maracaibo	Long jump
Gold medal – first place	1989 Maracaibo	Heptathlon
Silver medal – second place	1977 La Paz	100 m hurdles
Silver medal – second place	1989 Maracaibo	High jump
Bronze medal – third place	1989 Maracaibo	4 × 100 metres relay

Nancy Vallecilla (born November 24, 1957) is a retired female athlete from Ecuador, who competed in the hurdling events and the heptathlon.

She represented her native country twice at the Summer Olympics: 1980 and 1988.

Vallecilla finished fifth in the pentathlon at the 1979 Pan American Games as well as fourth (1987) and seventh (1979) in the 100 metres hurdles at the Pan American Games.

== International competitions ==
Year	Competition	Venue	Position	Event	Notes
Representing Ecuador
1977	Bolivarian Games	La Paz, Bolivia	2nd	100 m hurdles	14.03
1977	Bolivarian Games	La Paz, Bolivia	1st	Long jump	6.06 m
1977	Bolivarian Games	La Paz, Bolivia	1st	Pentathlon	3753 pts
1978	Southern Cross Games	La Paz, Bolivia	2nd	400 m	59.05 A
1978	Southern Cross Games	La Paz, Bolivia	1st	100 m hurdles	13.80 A
1978	Southern Cross Games	La Paz, Bolivia	3rd	Long jump	5.90 m A
1978	Southern Cross Games	La Paz, Bolivia	1st	Pentathlon	3798 pts A
1979	Pan American Games	San Juan, Puerto Rico	7th	100 m hurdles	14.23 (w)
1979	Pan American Games	San Juan, Puerto Rico	11th	Long jump	5.29 m
1979	Pan American Games	San Juan, Puerto Rico	5th	Pentathlon	3818 pts
1979	Universiade	Mexico City, Mexico	17th (h)	100 m hurdles	14.10
1980	Olympic Games	Moscow, Soviet Union	—	Pentathlon	DNF
1981	South American Championships	La Paz, Bolivia	2nd	100 m hurdles	13.8 A
1981	South American Championships	La Paz, Bolivia	2nd	400 m hurdles	62.2 A
1981	South American Championships	La Paz, Bolivia	4th	Heptathlon	4808 pts A
1981	Bolivarian Games	Barquisimeto, Venezuela	1st	100 m hurdles	13.83
1981	Bolivarian Games	Barquisimeto, Venezuela	1st	Heptathlon	5375 pts
1985	South American Championships	Santiago, Chile	5th	4 × 100 m relay	47.23
1985	South American Championships	Santiago, Chile	2nd	Heptathlon	4865 pts
1987	Pan American Games	Indianapolis, United States	4th	100 m hurdles	13.20
1987	Pan American Games	Indianapolis, United States	5th	4 × 400 m relay	3:49.74
1987	World Championships	Rome, Italy	14th (sf)	100 m hurdles	13.28
1988	Olympic Games	Seoul, South Korea	28th (h)	100 m hurdles	13.97
1989	Bolivarian Games	Maracaibo, Venezuela	1st	100 m hurdles	13.59 w
1989	Bolivarian Games	Maracaibo, Venezuela	3rd	4 × 100 metres relay	49.35
1989	Bolivarian Games	Maracaibo, Venezuela	2nd	High jump	1.64 m
1989	Bolivarian Games	Maracaibo, Venezuela	1st	Long jump	5.72m
1989	Bolivarian Games	Maracaibo, Venezuela	1st	Heptathlon	5102 pts

Olympic Games
Preceded by Nelson Suárez	Flag bearer for Ecuador; Moscow 1980	Succeeded by Héctor Hurtado
