= Hipólito Pozo =

Ecuadorian cyclist

Personal information
- Born: 14 July 1941 (age 85) Ibarra, Ecuador

Cycling career
- Sport: Cycling

Hipólito Pozo (born 14 July 1941) is a former Ecuadorian cyclist. He competed in the individual road race and the team time trial events at the 1968 Summer Olympics.
