= Martha Tenorio =

Ecuadorian long-distance runner

Personal information
- Full name: Martha Tenorio Pancar
- Born: August 6, 1966 (age 59) Salcedo, Cotopaxi, Ecuador

Sport
- Country: Ecuador
- Sport: Women's athletics

Achievements and titles
- Olympic finals: 1992 Summer Olympics; 1996 Summer Olympics; 2000 Summer Olympics
Medal record
Women's Athletics
Representing Ecuador
South American Games
Gold medal – first place	1998 Cuenca	5,000 m
Gold medal – first place	1998 Cuenca	10,000 m
Bolivarian Games
Gold medal – first place	1989 Maracaibo	5,000 m
Gold medal – first place	1993 Cochabamba	10,000 m
Gold medal – first place	1997 Arequipa	10,000 m
Gold medal – first place	2001 Ambato	5,000 m
Gold medal – first place	2001 Ambato	10,000 m
Gold medal – first place	2005 Armenia	10,000 m
Silver medal – second place	1993 Cochabamba	5,000 m

Martha Tenorio Pancar (born August 6, 1966) is an Ecuadorian retired female long-distance runner. She competed for her native country at three consecutive Summer Olympics, starting in 1992. Tenorio carried the flag for Ecuador at the opening ceremony of the 2000 Summer Olympics in Sydney, Australia.

== International competitions ==
Year	Competition	Venue	Position	Event	Notes
Representing Ecuador
1987	South American Championships	São Paulo, Brazil	2nd	3,000 m	10:02.63
1987	South American Championships	São Paulo, Brazil	3rd	10,000 m	35:11.5
1988	Ibero-American Championships	Mexico City, Mexico	2nd	3000m	9:46.66 A
1988	Ibero-American Championships	Mexico City, Mexico	1st	10,000 m	35:33.67 A
1989	Bolivarian Games	Maracaibo, Venezuela	1st	5,000 m	16:50.28
1992	Ibero-American Championships	Seville, Spain	6th	3000m	9:27.63
1992	Ibero-American Championships	Seville, Spain	3rd	10,000 m	33:29.69
1992	Olympic Games	Barcelona, Spain	38th (h)	10,000 m	34:29.03
1993	South American Championships	Lima, Peru	4th	1500 m	4:31.40
1993	South American Championships	Lima, Peru	4th	3000 m	9:59.3
1993	South American Championships	Lima, Peru	3rd	10,000 m	34:04.40
1993	Bolivarian Games	Cochabamba, Bolivia	2nd	5,000 m	9:50.37 A
1993	Bolivarian Games	Cochabamba, Bolivia	1st	10,000 m	35:12.10 A
1995	Pan American Games	Mar del Plata, Argentina	9th	10,000 m	34:55.61
1995	Pan American Games	Mar del Plata, Argentina	–	Marathon	DNF
1996	Olympic Games	Atlanta, United States	—	Marathon	DNF
1997	Bolivarian Games	Arequipa, Peru	1st	10,000 m	36:05.85 A
1998	South American Games	Cuenca, Ecuador	1st	5,000 m	16:27.6 A GR
1998	South American Games	Cuenca, Ecuador	1st	10,000 m	34:23.6 A GR
1999	Pan American Games	Winnipeg, Canada	5th	10,000 m	33:59.86
2000	Olympic Games	Sydney, Australia	25th	Marathon	2:33:54
2001	Bolivarian Games	Ambato, Ecuador	1st	5,000 m	17:16.3 A
2001	Bolivarian Games	Ambato, Ecuador	1st	10,000 m	36:04.0 A
2003	Pan American Games	Santo Domingo, Dominican Republic	–	Marathon	DNF
2005	Bolivarian Games	Armenia, Colombia	1st	10,000 m	34:36.66 GR A

Olympic Games
Preceded by Felipe Delgado	Flag bearer for Ecuador; Sydney 2000	Succeeded by Alexandra Escobar
