= Carmen Malo =

Ecuadorian pistol shooter (born 1972)

Personal information
- Full name: Carmen Elena Malo Merchán
- Nationality: Ecuador
- Born: 24 May 1972 (age 54) Cuenca, Ecuador
- Height: 1.65 m (5 ft 5 in)
- Weight: 60 kg (132 lb)

Sport
- Sport: Shooting
- Events: 25 m pistol 10 m air pistol
- Club: Amistad Club (ECU)
- Coached by: Ernesto Vásquez

Carmen Elena Malo Merchán (born 24 May 1972 in Cuenca) is an Ecuadorian pistol shooter, who competed at three Olympic games. Malo made her official Olympic debut at the 2000 Summer Olympics in Sydney, where she finished twenty-first in the women's 10 m air pistol, with a score of 378 points, tying her position with Albania's Djana Mata, and Germany's Anke Völker, wife of multiple-time Olympic medalist Ralf Schumann.

At the 2004 Summer Olympics, Malo competed in two pistol shooting events. She placed fortieth in the women's 10 m air pistol, with a score of 365 points, but managed to obtain her second attempt for a medal in the women's 25 m pistol. Unfortunately, she scored only 536 points in the qualifying rounds, finishing in thirty-sixth place.

At the 2008 Summer Olympics in Beijing, Malo obtained a well-improved score of 559 points (281 for the precision shooting, and 278 for the rapid-fire stage) in the women's 25 m pistol event; however, her performance was insufficiently enough to qualify into the final, as she came only in penultimate place out of forty-one shooters, by just one point ahead of Canada's Avianna Chao.
