= Nicolas Wettstein =

Ecuadorian equestrian (born 1981)

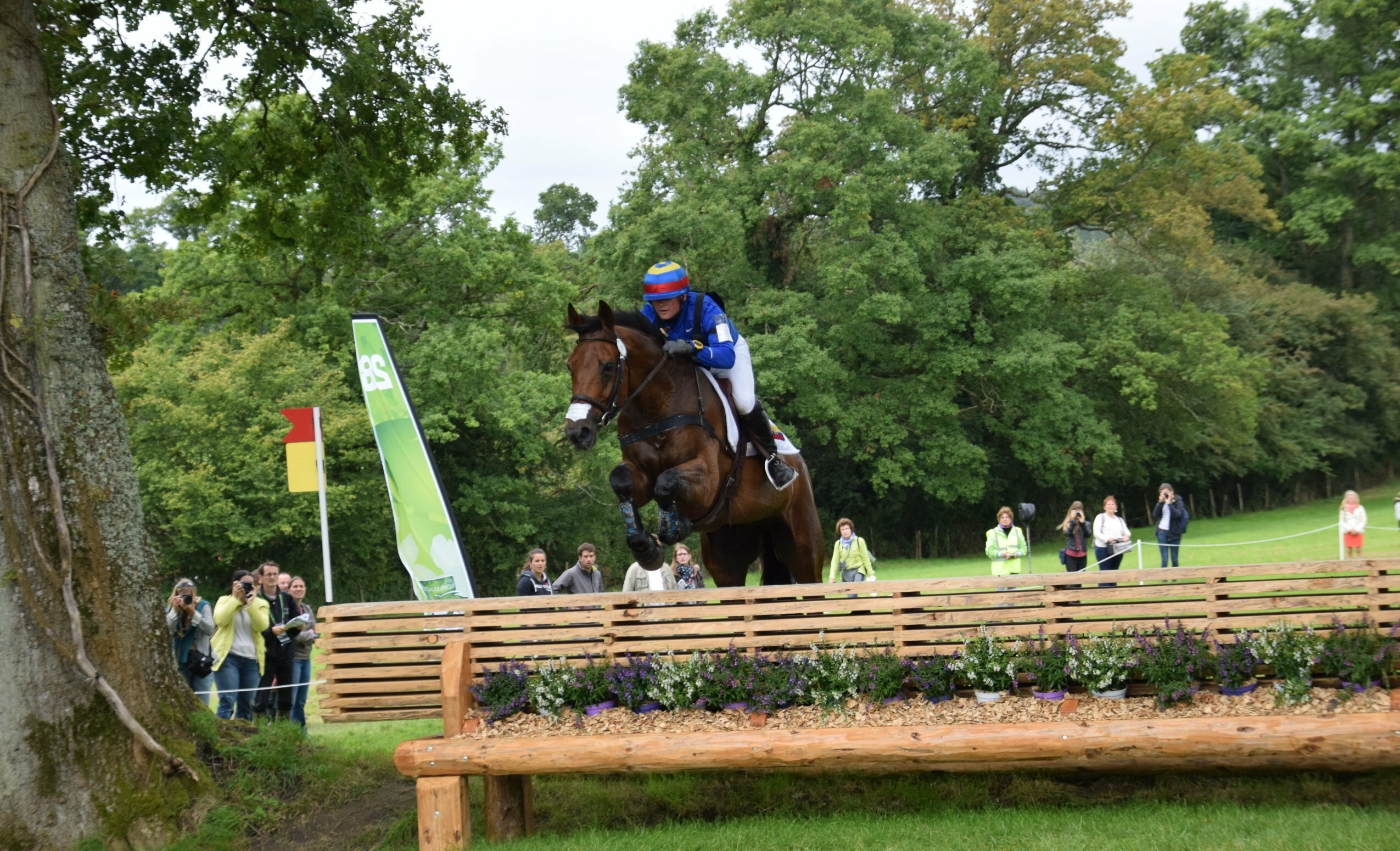
- Wettstein at the 2014 World Equestrian Games

Personal information
- Full name: Nicolas Lionel Wettstein Wettstein
- Born: Nicolas Lionel Wettstein; 30 March 1981 (age 45) Basel, Switzerland
- Height: 171 cm (5 ft 7 in)

Nicolas Lionel Wettstein Wettstein (born 30 March 1981) is an Olympic eventing rider. Born in Switzerland, he competed for Ecuador at the 2016 Summer Olympics in Rio de Janeiro in the individual competition, but failed to complete the cross-country phase. He then qualified to represent Ecuador at the 2020 Summer Olympics. Riding Altier d'Aurois, he improved on his Rio performance, and eventually placed 41st.

Wettstein also participated at the 2014 World Equestrian Games and at the 2015 Pan American Games. He finished 4th in the team eventing competition at the 2015 Pan Am Games held in Toronto, Canada.

== Personal life ==
Wettstein was born in Switzerland, and is of French descent through his mother. He was married to an Ecuadorian for 10 years, and through her gained Ecuadorian citizenship.

== International Championship Results ==
Results
Year	Event	Horse	Placing	Notes
2002	European Young Rider Championships	Cap du Tremblay	9th	Team
2002	European Young Rider Championships	Cap du Tremblay	33rd	Individual
2009	World Young Horse Championships	Onzieme Framoni	40th	CCI**
2014	World Equestrian Games	Nadeville Merze	RET	Individual
2015	Pan American Games	Onzieme Framoni	4th	Team
2015	Pan American Games	Onzieme Framoni	13th	Individual
2016	Olympic Games	Nadeville Merze	RET	Individual
2018	World Equestrian Games	Meyer's Happy	67th	Individual
2019	Pan American Games	Onzieme Framoni	EL	Individual
2021	Olympic Games	Altier d'Aurois	41st	Individual
EL = Eliminated; RET = Retired; WD = Withdrew
