= Elizabeth Bravo =

Ecuadorian triathlete (born 1987)

Personal information
- Born: 30 January 1987 (age 39) Cuenca, Ecuador

Sport
- Country: Ecuador
- Sport: Triathlon
Medal record
Women's triathlon
Representing Ecuador
Americas Championships
Bronze medal – third place	2025 Calima	Mixed relay

Elizabeth Bravo (born 30 January 1987) is an Ecuadorian triathlete. She competed in the Women's event at the 2012 Summer Olympics. She finished in fourth place in the women's event at the 2015 Pan American Games. She competed at the 2020 Summer Olympics.

She competed in the women's triathlon at the 2024 Summer Olympics in Paris, France.
