= Ecuadorian Olympic Committee =

National Olympic Committee

- Country: Ecuador
- [[|]]
- Code: ECU
- Created: 1948
- Recognized: 1959
- Continental Association: PASO
- Headquarters: Guayaquil, Ecuador
- President: Jorge Delgado Panchana
- Secretary General: John Zambrano Haboud
- Website: www.coe.org.ec

The Ecuadorian Olympic Committee (IOC Code: ECU; Spanish: Comité Olímpico Ecuatoriano) was created in 1948 and recognized by the IOC in 1959.

In 2012, it had its autonomy reinstated "following domestic issues whereby the Sports Ministry interfered in the activities of the National Sports Federations."

== Logo ==
Former logo

== See also ==
- Ecuador at the Olympics
