= University Park, Lima =

Park and culture heritage site in Lima

Coordinates: 12°03′15″S 77°01′53″W

University Park
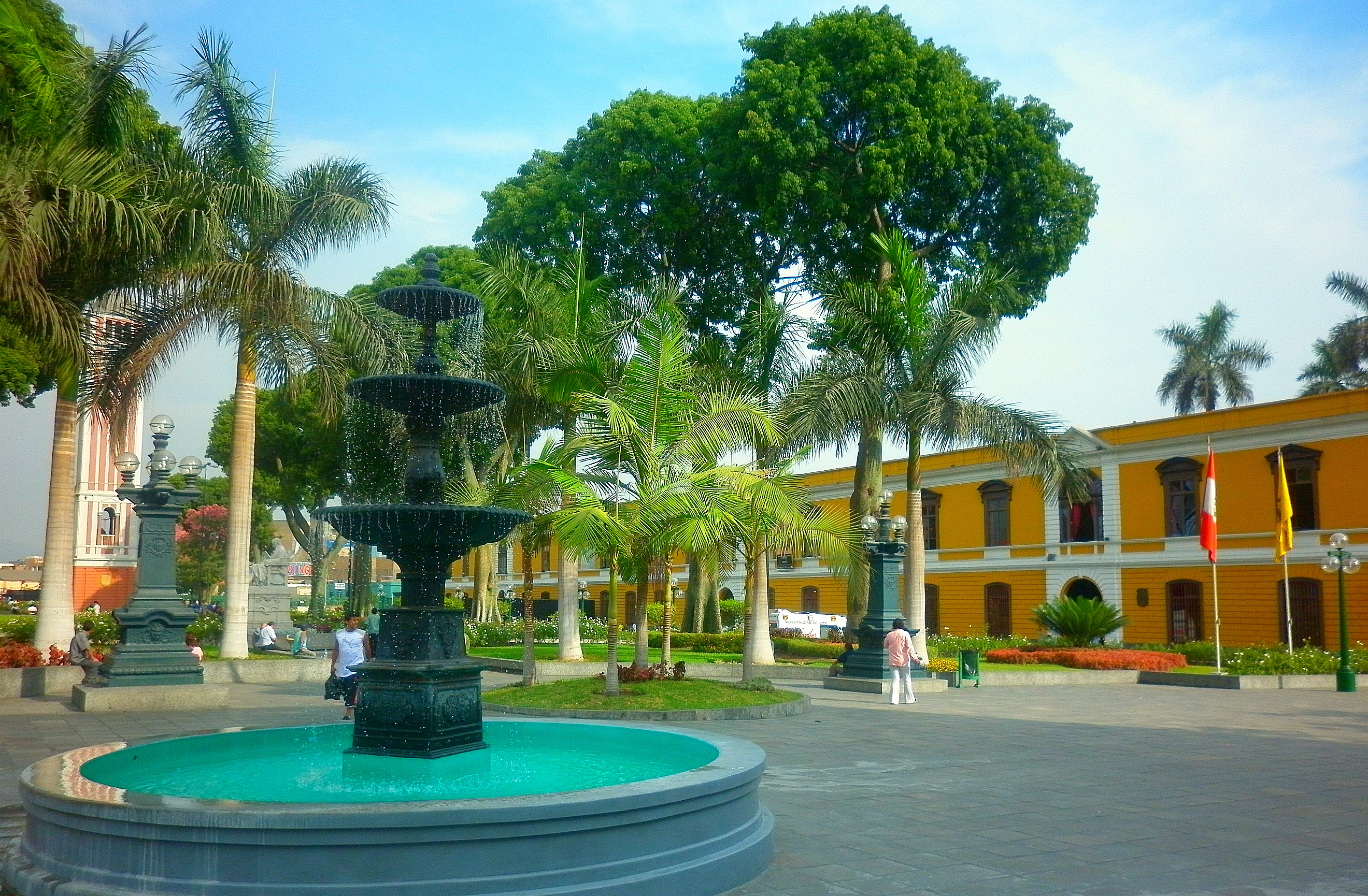
- The park (foreground) and the Casona de San Marcos (background)
- Interactive map of University Park
- Type: Public park
- Location: Historic Centre of Lima
- Created: 1923
- Operated by: Lima Park Service
- Open: 9:00 a.m. to 6:00 pm.

University Park is a public park located in the historic centre of the city of Lima, Peru. It is rectangular in shape and is located at the intersection of Abancay and Nicolás de Piérola avenues.

== History ==
It receives its name because of the historic headquarters of the Universidad Nacional Mayor de San Marcos, also known as the "Casona" and which until the last decades of the 19th century was the home of the viceregal Real Convictorio de San Carlos, is located there, currently a cultural center. The university settled in said premises in the mid-1870s, leaving its viceregal headquarters permanently occupied by the Chamber of Deputies (current Congress of the Republic). It would not be until 1966 that San Marcos abandoned said premises due to the damage inflicted on the building by the earthquake of that year to its Ciudad Universitaria campus, which is why the park was the scene of memorable demonstrations and student riots during much of the twentieth century.

The construction of the park was carried out at the beginning of the 1920s. During the 1980s and 1990s, after many years of deterioration, the University Park was renovated, building a couple of ornamental pools as well as a perimeter fence.

The park features several monuments, as well as the Torre Alemana, a monumental clock gifted to the city by the German colony on the occasion of the Centennial of the Independence of Peru, in 1921; likewise, next to the Casona de San Marcos is the Panteón de los Próceres.

== Monuments ==
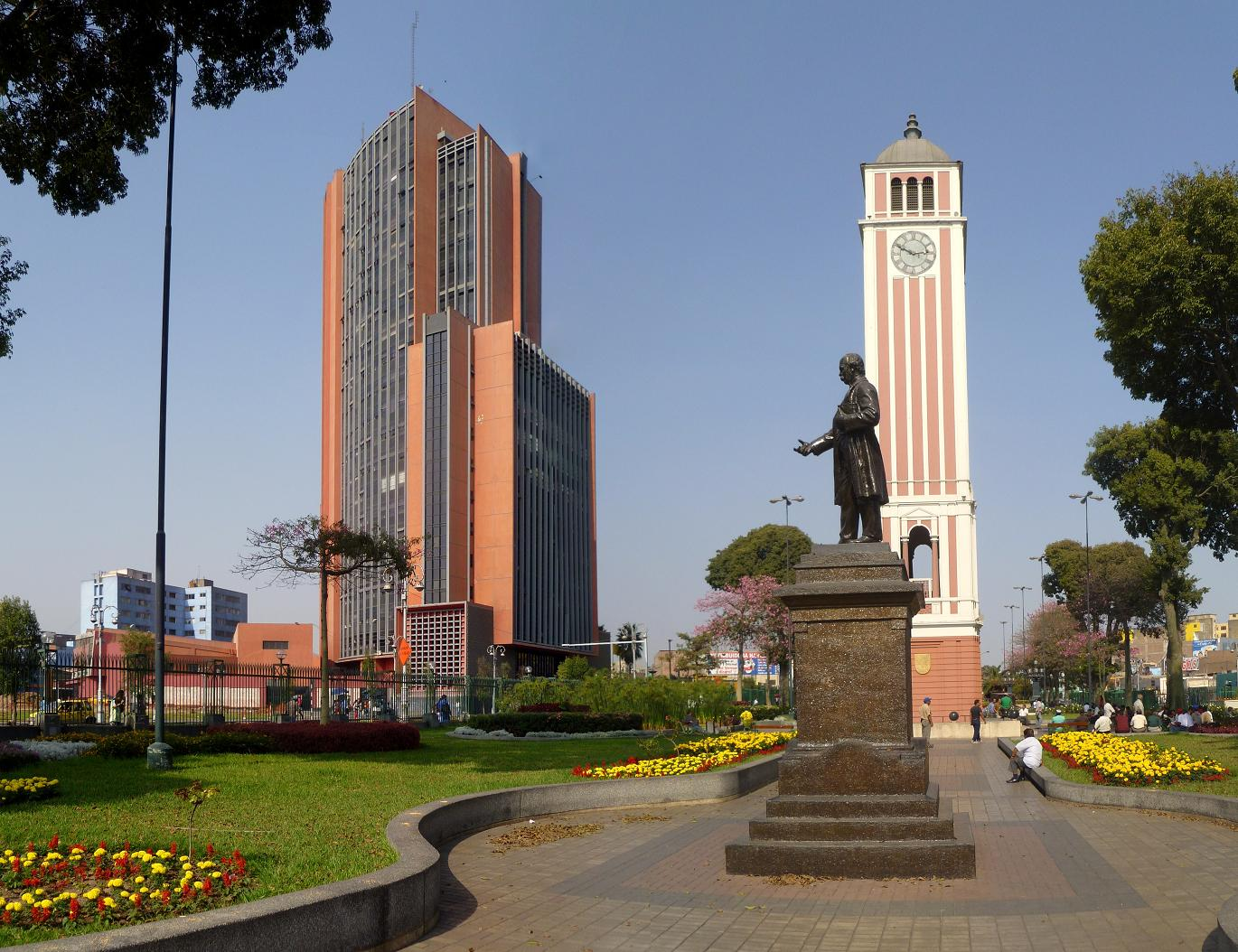
The park's tower (foreground) and the Alzamora Building (background).

The park is the location of the following monuments:

- The Monument to Sebastián Lorente, dedicated to Sebastián Lorente. The sculpture is located at the east end of the park, made of bronze and granite. The sculpture is a work of the Peruvian sculptor José Luis F. Agurto and was inaugurated on September 15, 1924.
- The Monument to Hipólito Unanue, dedicated to Hipólito Unanue. This was a precursor of the independence of Peru as well as a Peruvian politician and doctor. The monument of him located in front of the entrance of the Casona de San Marcos. It's made of Italian marble, the work of the Spanish sculptor Manuel Piqueras Cotolí. It was inaugurated on July 29, 1931.
- The Monument to Bartolomé Herrera, dedicated to Bartolomé Herrera. It's located next to the clock tower. Made of bronze and marble, it was inaugurated in 1922, having been donated by the Government of Germany. The monument is the work of the Spanish sculptor, Gregorio Domingo.

== See also ==
- Casona of the National University of San Marcos, located next to the park
- Javier Alzamora Valdez Building, located across the street from the park
