= Pedro José Bravo de Lagunas y Castilla Altamirano =

Peruvian Jurist

Pedro José Bravo de Lagunas
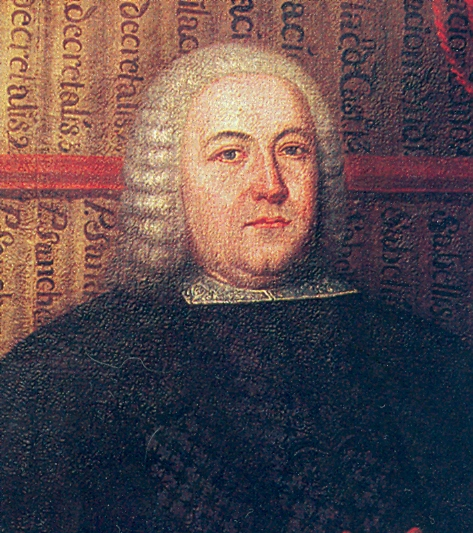
- Born: October 1, 1703; Lima, Peru
- Died: February 1, 1762 (aged 58); Lima, Peru
- Education: Royal College of San Martín; College of San Felipe and San Marcos

Pedro José Bravo de Lagunas y Castilla Altamirano, 1st Marquis of Torreblanca (October 1, 1703—February 1, 1762) was a Peruvian Creole jurist and professor.

== Education ==
He was the son of the field master Pedro Bravo de Lagunas y Bedoya, mayor of Piura, and Mariana de Castilla Altamirano y Loayza. He began his studies at the Royal College of San Martín and then moved on to the Royal College of San Felipe and San Marcos, where he became a professor of Old Digest, Code, and Vespers of Sacred Canons, as well as rector.

== Law ==
He earned his bachelor's and doctorate degrees in law from the University of San Marcos, and after receiving his degree as a lawyer before the Royal Court of Lima, he was named prosecutor protector of Indians, also serving in the ecclesiastical court of wills, legacies, and charitable works. He acted as general advisor to the Viceroyalty during the administration of the Marquis of Villagarcía and was named supernumerary judge of the Lima Court. Later, he would be elected honorary counselor of the Council of the Indies.

He took possession of the chair of Prima de Leyes at the university, attending to the legal affairs of the cloister as attorney general. He obtained his retirement on June 14, 1757, and, ordained a priest, he entered the Oratory of Saint Philip Neri on January 19, 1759.

== Works ==
- Voto consultivo (1755).
- Discurso histórico jurídico del origen, fundación, reedificación, derechos y exenciones del Hospital de San Lázaro de Lima (1761)
- Colección legal de cartas, dictámenes y otros papeles en Derecho (1761)

== Titles ==
On September 15, 1776, the King of Spain, Charles III, granted him the title of Marquis of Torreblanca.
