= Miguelina =

Miguelina is a feminine given name. Notable people with the name include:

- Miguelina Acosta Cárdenas (1887−1933), Peruvian feminist
- Miguelina Cobián (1941−2019), Cuban sprinter
- Miguelina Hernández (b. 1998), Dominican Republic boxer
- Miguelina Howell, Dominican Republic bishop
