= Miguelina Acosta Cárdenas =

Peruvian lawyer, feminist and anarchic activist

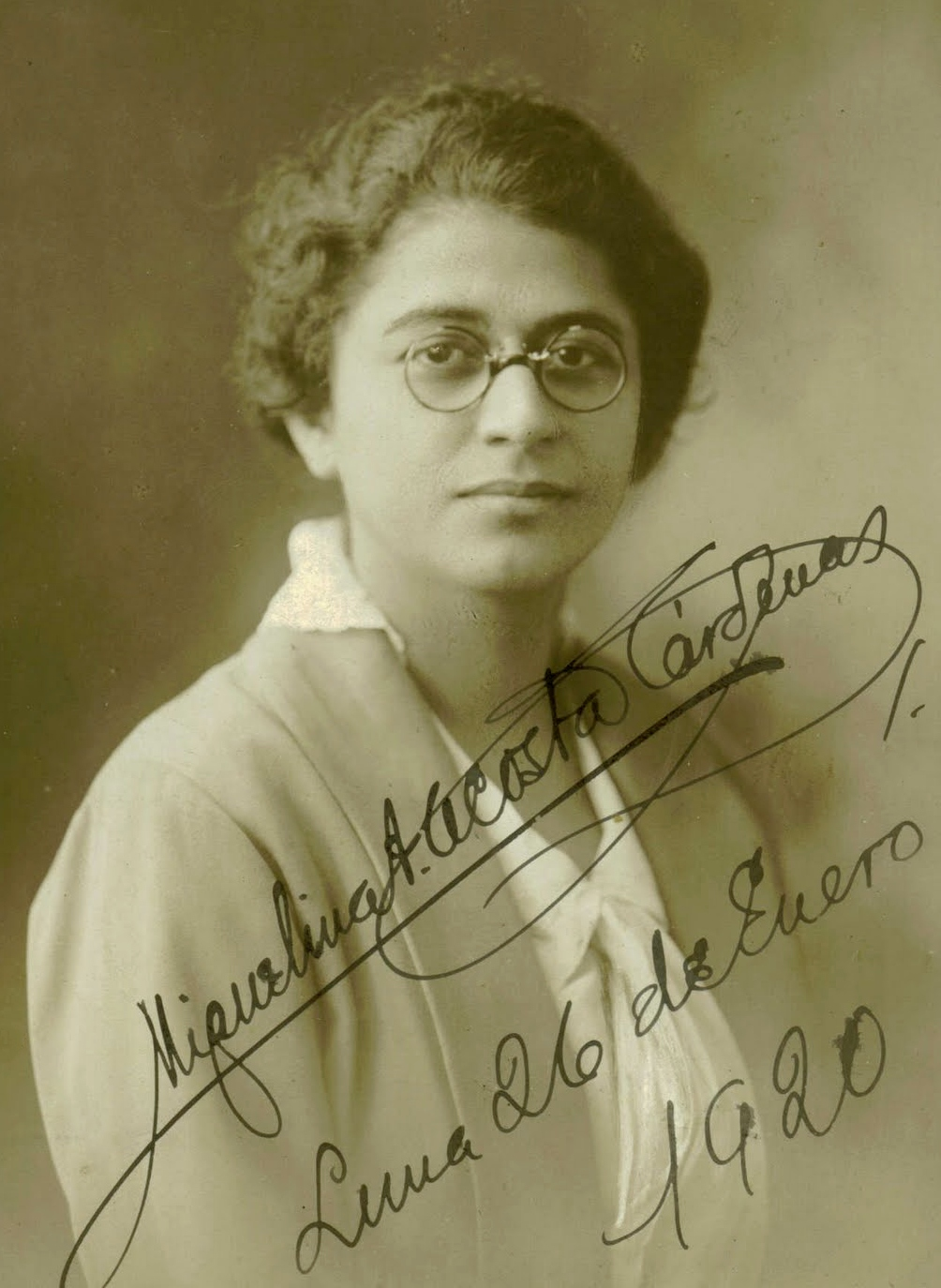
- Acosta Cárdenas in 1920
- Born: Miguelina Aurora Acosta Cárdenas; 23 November 1887; Yurimaguas, Loreto, Peru
- Died: 26 October 1933 (aged 45); Lima, Peru
- Education: National University of San Marcos
- Occupations: lawyer, anarcho-feminist, anarcho-syndicalist

Miguelina Aurora Acosta Cárdenas (23 November 1887 – 26 October 1933) was a Peruvian feminist, anarcho-syndicalist activist, teacher, and lawyer, who dedicated much of her life to the fight for women's rights, the Amazonian peoples and the working class. She is the first Peruvian woman to graduate in law in Peru and is considered the first female trial lawyer in Peru.

== Life ==
Miguelina Acosta Cárdenas was born in Yurimaguas, Loreto, on 23 November 1887. Her family owned a rubber plantation in Loreto. When she was between 12 and 16 years old, she traveled to Europe with her mother to study there. During this time, she studied in France, Switzerland, and Germany. In Europe, Acosta Cárdenas was immersed in an environment that fostered her progressive ideas. When she returned to Peru, Acosta Cárdenas founded a school for young ladies (Colegio de Señoritas) in Yurimaguas, and the first initial education center in Peru. By this time the period of rubber exploitation had ended due to the discovery of synthetic substitutes.

Acosta Cárdenas' studies in Europe were not recognized in Peru, and she entered the Faculty of Art at the National University of San Marcos in Lima, where she experienced discrimination and exclusion as university education and professional practice at that time in Peru were considered exclusively men's privileges. During her university studies, Acosta Cárdenas was interested in different groups of social and political activists, especially the "Pro-Indigenous Association", an institution founded in 1909 by the student Pedro Zulen and Dora Mayer.

After finishing her studies at the Faculty of Arts, Acosta Cárdenas entered the Faculty of Law and Political Sciences, from which she graduated in 1920 with a thesis on civil and legal equality between men and women. Later she received a doctorate in law with the thesis "Necessary reforms of the Peruvian common civil code aimed at making effective the civil and legal equality of men and women".

== Work ==
In 1914, she began to contribute to the incipient Peruvian women's movement. Acosta Cárdenas was elected as part of the Board of Directors of the feminist organization Evolución Femenina, founded that same year by María Jesús Alvarado Rivera. Within this organization, she demanded for women both better educational opportunities as well as the same civil and political rights as men.

In 1917, Acosta Cárdenas, together with Dora Mayer, founded independent weekly newspaper La Crítica and was its editor until 1920.

After graduating as a lawyer, she opened an office where she protected labor and women's rights, becoming the first female lawyer to open a professional practice. Having started her professional practice, Acosta Cárdenas did not stop participating in the social activities in Lima that aimed to improve the condition of workers, Indians and women. Among them, her participation in the "Second Pan American Conference of Women" in December 1924 stands out. There she expressed the idea of a flexible system of education for indigenous children by creating a system of "mobile rural schools". Acosta Cárdenas' participation in the circle of intellectuals, workers and Indians that had arisen around José Carlos Mariátegui between 1923 and 1930 led to the publication of this exhibition in February 1928 in the avant-garde magazine "Amauta".

She was secretary of Evolución Femenina, a feminist association, she also participated in the women's section of La Liga Agraria and its annex El Bazar Nacional and was an honorary member of the Labor Feminist society. She also was a teacher at the González Prada Popular Universities, and collaborated in El Obrero Textil and Amauta in 1920.

Acosta Cárdenas oscillated between her anarchist and feminist ideology, and her adherence to an international Hindu theosophical branch. She was active in the Mixed society «Equality» No. 636. She attended meetings with the Hindu theosophist C. Jinarajadasa, who granted recognition of their international brotherhood. On 19 April 1929, she, next to Zoila Aurora Cáceres, Laura Farje de Leo and María Negrón Ugarte, appeared as one of the founding partners.

== Death and legacy ==
In 1933, at just 45 years of age, Acosta Cárdenas became the victim of dental malpractice; a bad tooth extraction caused an infection which led to her death in Lima on 26 October 1933. She was buried in the Baquíjano y Carrillo del Callao cemetery.

In 2020, Heraldos editors, in a Joel Rojas edition, published Miguelina Acosta Cárdenas – Escritos selectos, a compilation of more than 30 opinion articles, published and unpublished, and two theses of Acosta Cárdenas.
