= Casona of the National University of San Marcos =

Cultural center in Lima, Peru

Casona de San Marcos
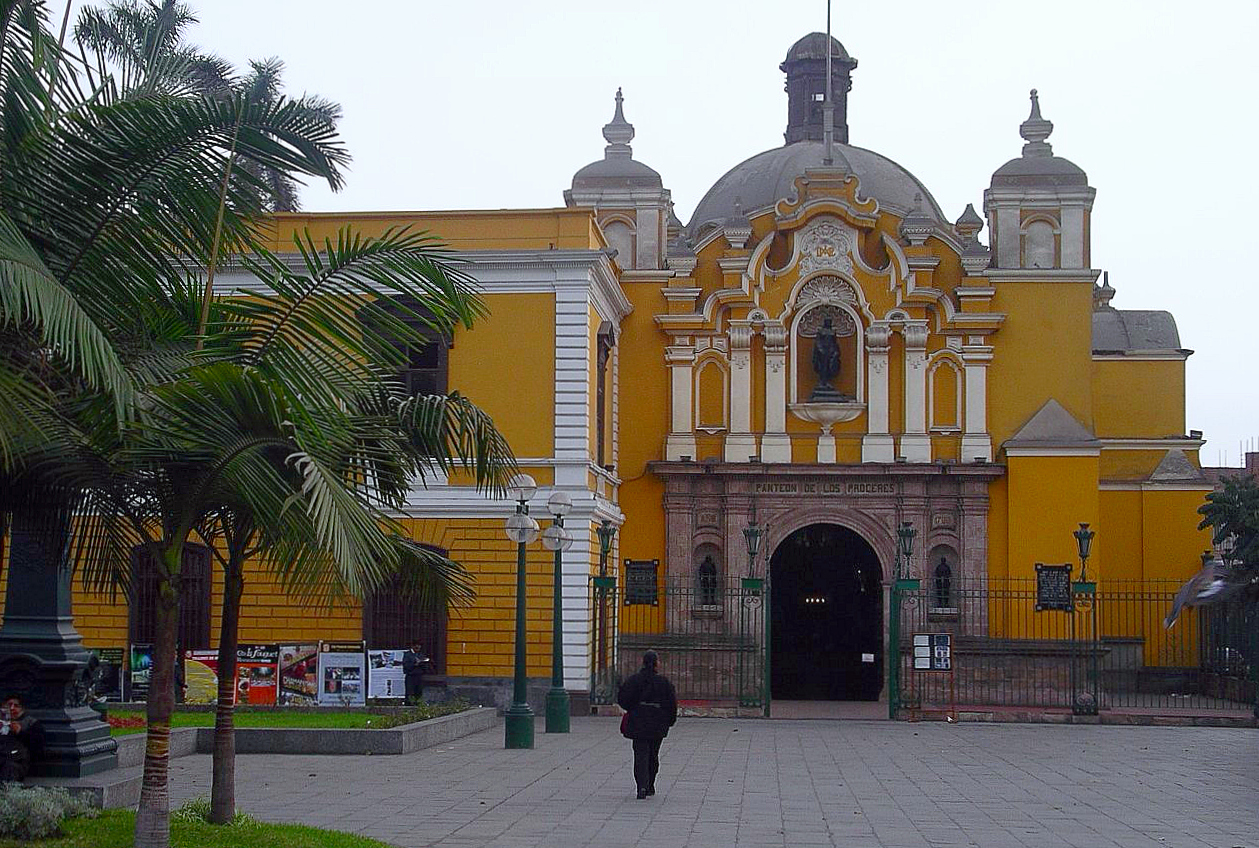
- View of the building's chapel from the park
- Interactive map of the Casona de San Marcos area

General information
- Type: Institution, cultural centre
- Architectural style: Baroque, Rococo
- Location: Lima, Av. Nicolás de Piérola 1222, University Park, Lima, Peru
- Coordinates: 12.0545°S 77.0322°W
- Opened: 1605
- Owner: University of San Marcos

UNESCO World Heritage Site
- Criteria: Cultural: iv
- Reference: 500
- Inscription: 1988 (12th Session)
- Area: 259.36 ha (640.9 acres)
- Buffer zone: 766.70 ha (1,894.6 acres)

The Casona of the National University of San Marcos (Spanish: Casona de la Universidad Nacional Mayor de San Marcos), also known as the Cultural Centre of San Marcos (Spanish: Centro Cultural de San Marcos, CCSM), which operates in the building, is a large Spanish colonial building that hosts the cultural centre of the National University of San Marcos, located in the Historic Centre of Lima, Peru. The building, as well as its adjacent public space, known as the University Park, is part of the area and of the list of buildings of the Historic Center of Lima that were recognized as a World Heritage Site by UNESCO, in 1988.

Located in the old building of the Noviciado de San Antonio Abad—a Jesuit novitiate—and of the Real Convictorio de San Carlos, it became the university's headquarters between 1875 and 1966, when most of its administrative offices were moved to the campus of the University City. It serves as the main reference of the cultural and artistic activity of the university, and is one of the best preserved constructions of the colonial era in Lima, housing a theatre known as the University Theatre (TUSM), a library and directorates of ballet, folklore, music, film and television, among others. It also houses two museums: the Museum of Art (MASM), the Museum of Archaeology and Anthropology (MAA). It is the oldest of the seats currently occupied by the university and one of the most important non-religious historical buildings in the city of Lima.

== History ==
The history of the building begins in 1605, when the wealthy Spaniard Antonio Correa Ureña granted an important donation for the construction of a novitiate built to educate and train the new members of the Society of Jesus. At this time, the dimensions of the novitiate that was called that of San Antonio Abad, was five or even six times larger than the current size of the building. After being partially destructed by the earthquake of 1746, the Jesuits rebuilt it again with a new design, completing the current building. In 1767 three years after the expulsion of the Jesuit order, Viceroy of Peru Manuel de Amat y Junyent founded the Real Convictorio de San Carlos, a type of university, in the former ecclesiastical building, in honour of King Charles III of Spain. This college reached great apogee from the end-18th century until 19th century.

After the proclamation of the independence in 1821, the college continued its work with an almost complete autonomy with respect to the University of San Marcos, until in 1867 it decrees the inclusion of the college of San Carlos and of the Independencia (San Fernando) into it.

Since the transfer of the university, the building remained a place of great historical value and importance, not only for the university, but also for the city of Lima. Since the building suffered a damage caused by the earthquake of 1966, the university was transferred to the new University City, its current main headquarters. The building was then modified to lodge the institutions of cultural extension of the university.

In 1989, the National University of San Marcos, the Spanish Agency for International Development Cooperation and the National Institute of Culture signed a cooperation agreement to restore the architectural set and to be dedicated to culture, research and artistic creations. The works were carried out with the economic and technical support of the Spanish Cooperation.

The building currently houses the university's cultural centre, which offers cultural extension courses, exhibitions and is home to several university museums and research centers. Inside Inside the building is the Hall of Degrees (formerly the Chapel of Loreto), where the official ceremonies of the honoris causa doctorates that the university grants are realized; the General Hall and the courts of Law, that of Letters, that of Sciences, that of the Jasmines and that of Boys.

== Overview ==
=== Halls ===
==== Chapel of Nuestra Señora de Loreto ====
The Chapel of Nuestra Señora de Loreto, also called Hall of Degrees of Literature, is located between the courtyards of Literature and Jasmines. This is one of the most beautiful environments that has the old Casona de San Marcos.

Its vault has thirteen beautiful paintings from the mid-18th century, inspired by saints and doctors of the Church like St. Augustine, St. Thomas Aquinas and others.

==== General Hall ====
In front of the Courtyard of the Jasmines is the Salón General (General Hall), formed by courtroom, stands and wooden galleries, dating from the late-18th century. In this room of debates and controversies, the most important ceremonies of the University are currently held, such as graduations, solemn sessions and seminars.

=== Courtyards ===
At the early-20th century, the Casona de San Marcos had of five main cloisters. The Law Faculty worked in the Courtyard los Maestros, which is the main one and has in the center a carved sculpture, mute witness to innumerable historical events and symbol of the University that appears in the current bills of 20 nuevos soles.

The Courtyard of los Naranjos was occupied by the Arts and Education Faculty; the Courtyard of los Chicos, by the Faculty of Sciences, Chemistry and Physics; and the Courtyard of los Jasmines, by the Faculty of Jurisprudence. The fifth patio faced the garden.

=== Museums ===
==== Museum of Archaeology and Anthropology ====
Logo used by the museum.

The Museum of Archaeology and Anthropology (Spanish: Museo de Arqueología y Antropología MAA), formerly the Museum of Archeology and Ethnology (Spanish: Museo de Arqueología y Etnología), is the university's archaeology and anthropology museum.

It was founded on October 21, 1919, it has a collection of lithic, ceramic and organic elements. Its first director was Dr. Julio C. Tello. In celebration of its 104th anniversary, it added two rooms to its permanent collection in 2023.

==== Museum of Art ====
Logo used by the museum.

The Museum of Art (Spanish: Museo de Arte MASM) is the university's art museum. One of its former curators includes the late Rebeca Carrión Cachot, a Peruvian archaeologist, historian and teacher who studied under the aforementioned Tello.

The history of the museum began on September 27, 1951, when Pedro Dulanto, then rector of the university, founded the Museum of Pictorial Reproductions (Spanish: Museo de Reproducciones Pictóricas), to which the Museum of Art and History (Spanish: Museo de Arte e Historia) was added on February 17, 1970 through the efforts of Dr. Francisco Stastny, a Czechoslovak writer and historian. On October 23, 1996, rector Manuel Paredes Manrique merged both institutions to convert it into the current museum.

Its collection includes four major collections: popular art, portraits, modern art, and an archive of farmer's paintings. The portraits include those of the university's well-known staff, as well as its alumni.

=== Theatre ===
The San Marcos University Theatre (Spanish: Teatro Universitario de San Marcos, TUSM) is the university's theatre group. It was founded on September 4, 1946, by a group of students from the university's faculty of letters.

Since its creation, it has been headed by a number of directors, which include:

№	Director	Period
1	Mario Rivera	1946
2	Humberto Napurí Jordán	1956
3	Guillermo Ugarte Chamorro	1958–1988
4	Eduardo Hopkins	1988–1992
5	Hernando Cortés	1992–1997
6	Walter Zambrano	1998–2001
7	Ana Zavala	2002–2007
8	Luis Ramírez	2007
9	Gabriela Velásquez	2007
10	Ernesto Ráez Mendiola	2008
11	Mario Delgado	2010
12	Augusto Cáceres Álvarez	2011–present

== Gallery ==
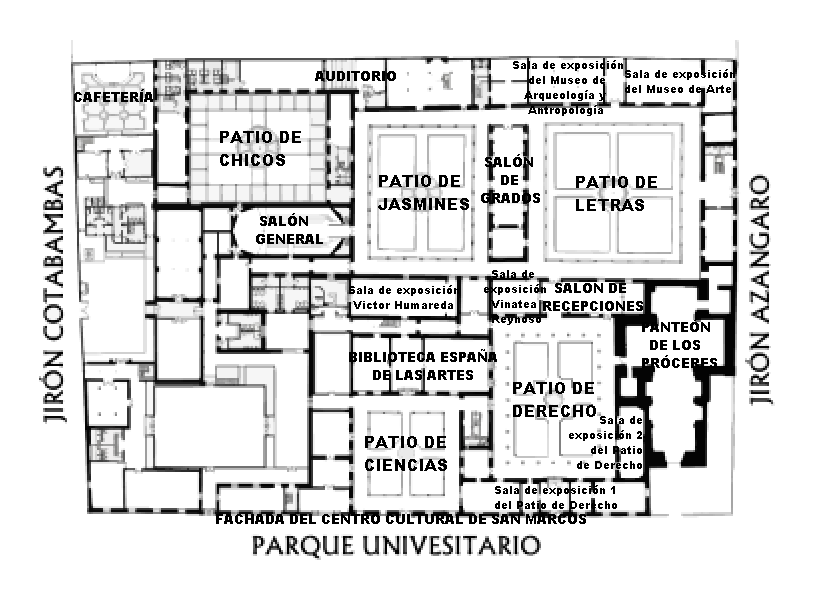
Building plan

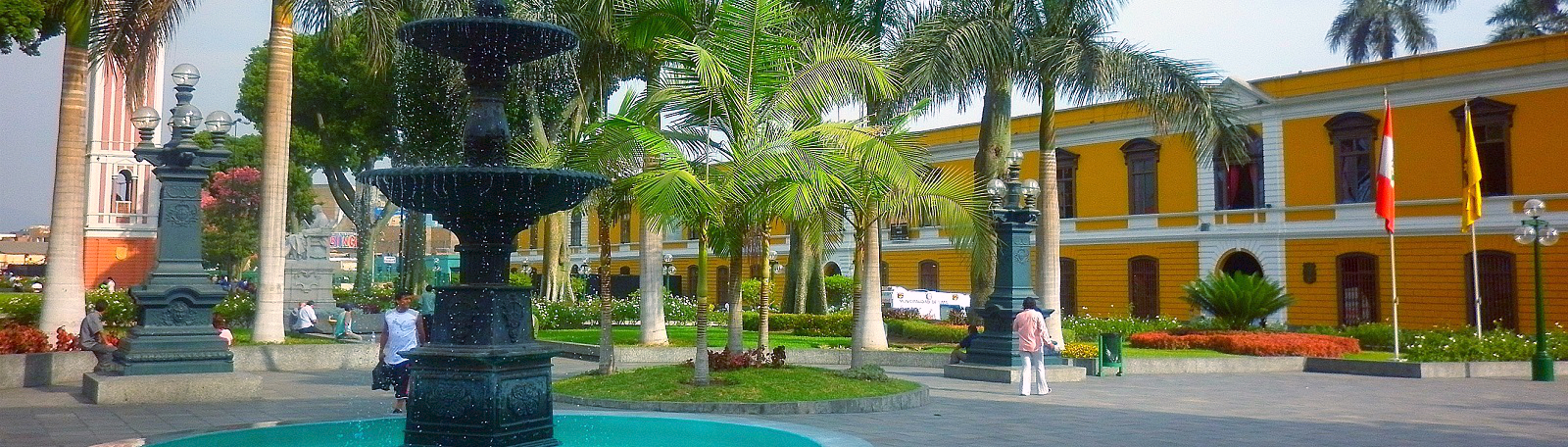
Panoramic view of the building and its adjacent park, including its German Tower and other monuments, as well as the Panteón de los Próceres.

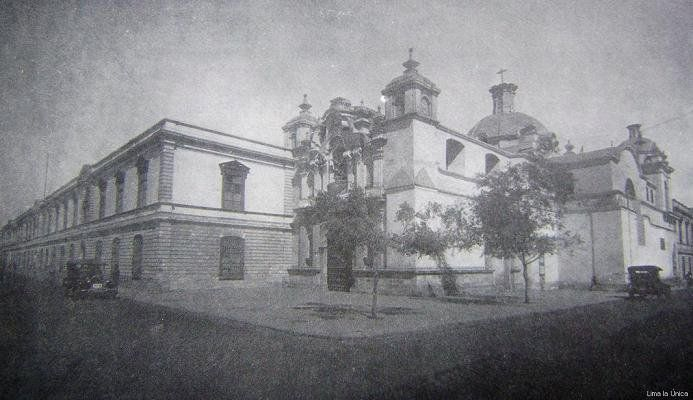
The building and its chapel in 1925.

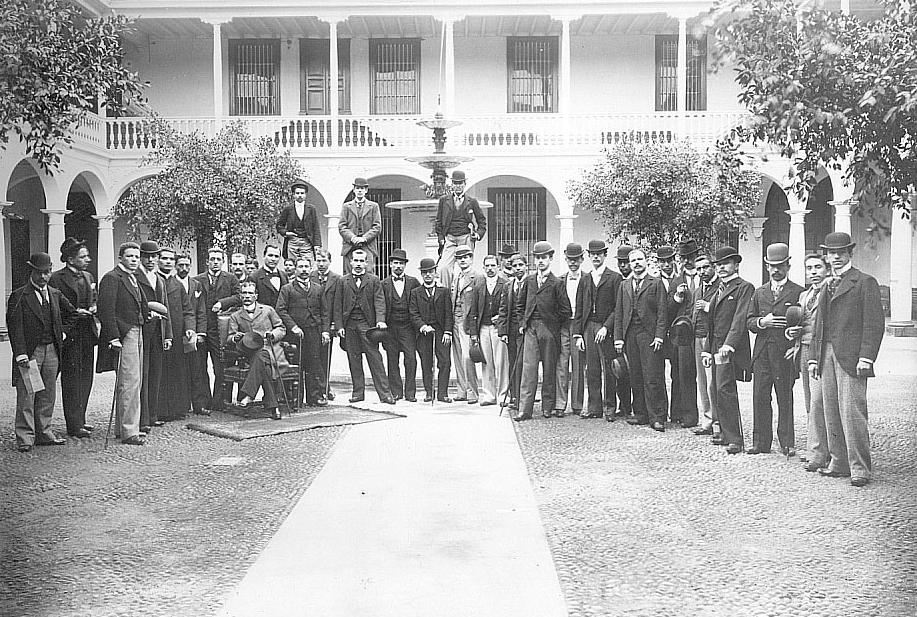
Jurisprudence and Law alumni of 1896 at a courtyard

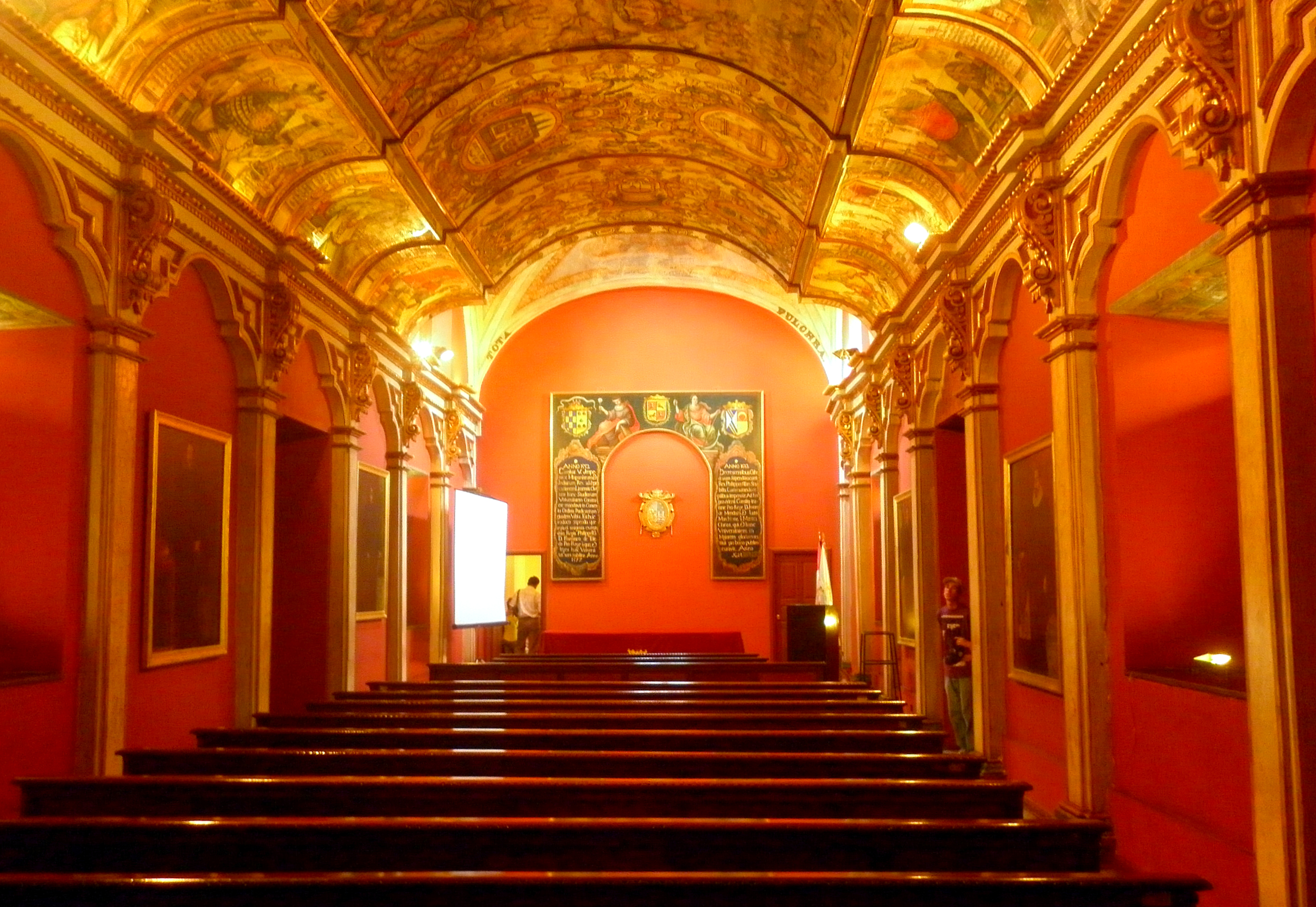
The 18th-century paintings in the ceiling of the chapel

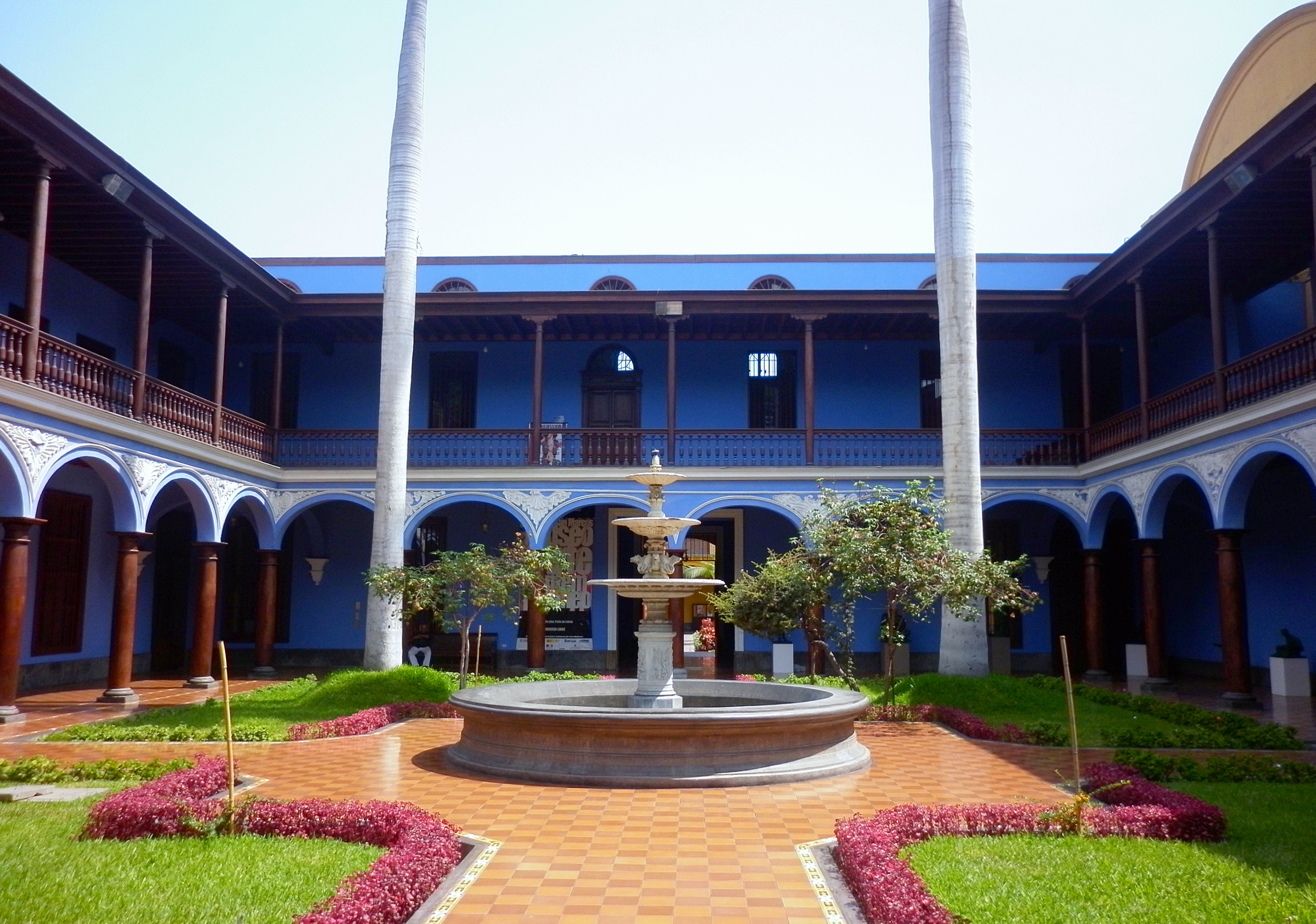
Rococo courtyard of los Maestros

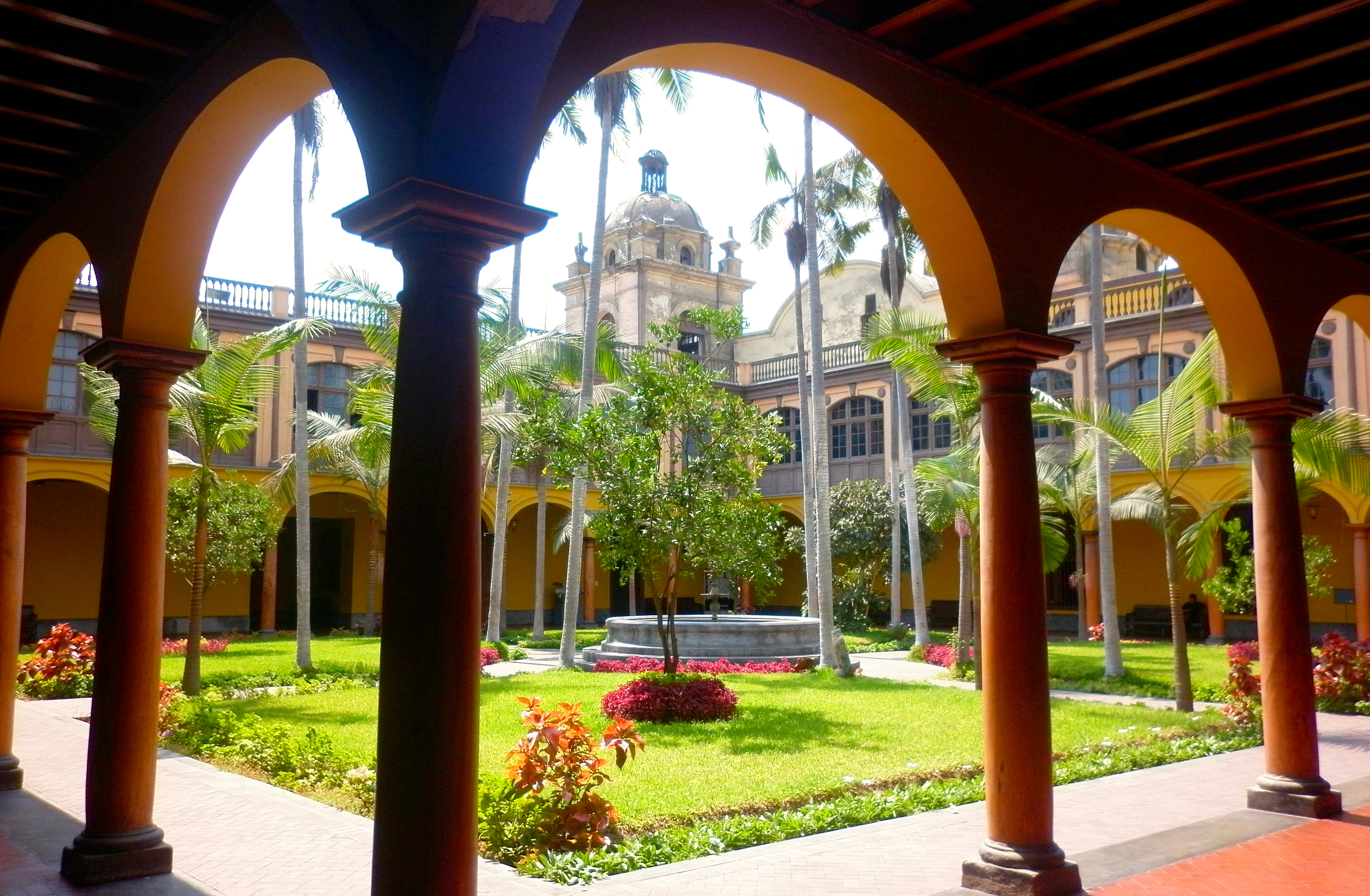
Courtyard of los Jazmines

== See also ==
- National University of San Marcos
- University City of the National University of San Marcos
- Royal College of the University of San Marcos
