= University City of the National University of San Marcos =

University campus in Lima, Peru

Ciudad Universitaria de la Universidad Nacional Mayor de San Marcos
- Ciudad Universitaria de Lima
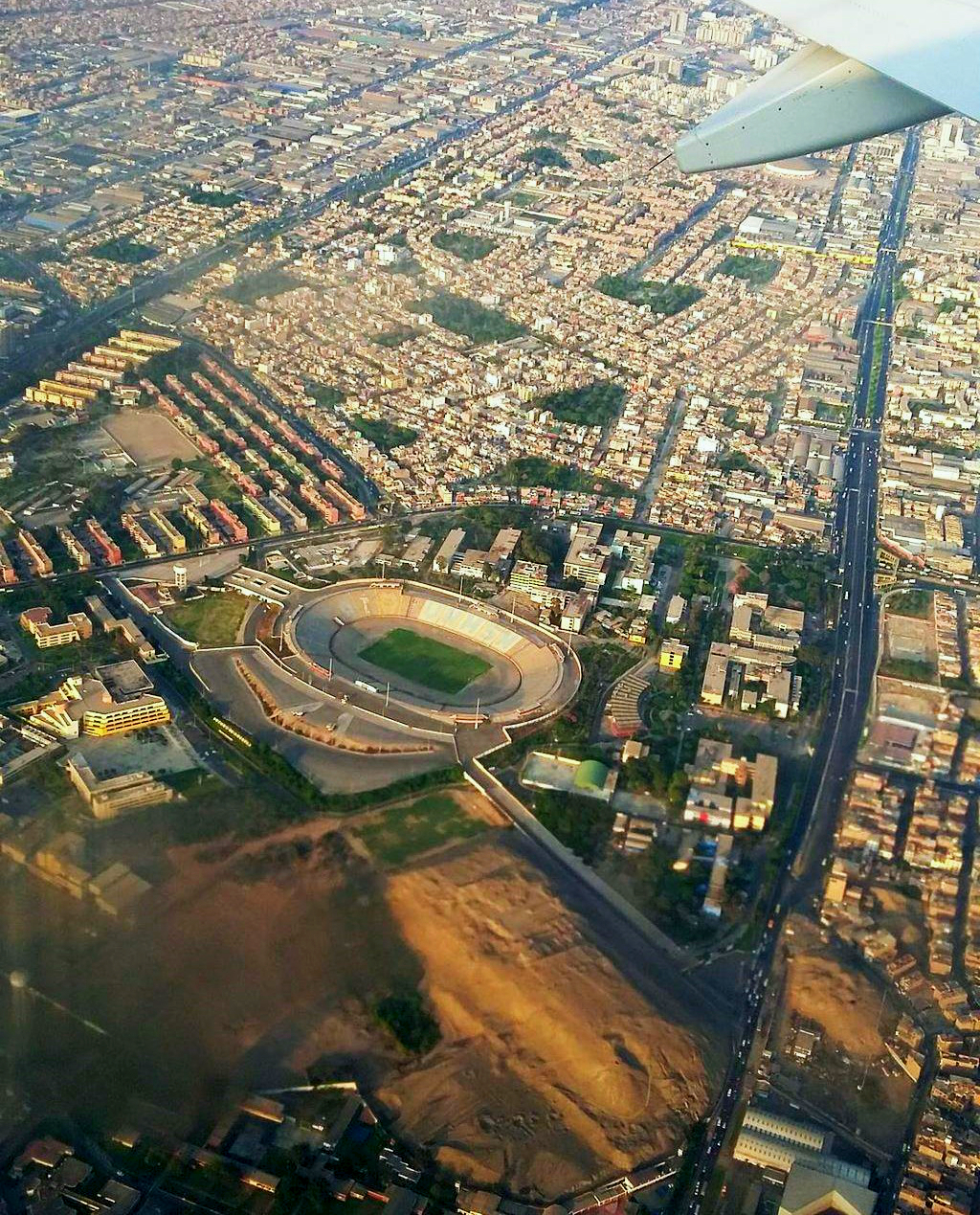
- Aerial view of a large part of the University City of the National University of San Marcos.
- Type: University city
- Established: 1950
- Parent institution: UNMSM
- Location: Lima, Peru; 12.05931°S 77.08798°W
- Website: www.ccsm-unmsm.edu.pe

The University City of the National University of San Marcos (acronym: CU-UNMSM), generally known as the University City of Lima or simply University City, is the main campus of the National University of San Marcos and is located in Lima District. In the University City of San Marcos are located the main administrative facilities of the university, such as the rectory. It is home to 17 of the 20 faculties of the University of San Marcos, the central library, the San Marcos University Stadium, the university gymnasium, the dining room of the "University City" and one of the university residences. In addition, the City includes the archaeological complex of the Huaca San Marcos, which is preserved and studied by San Marcos students and researchers.

== Administrative infrastructure ==
=== Rectorate "Jorge Basadre" ===
The rectorado is the university governing body constituted mainly by the rector. The rector is the first executive authority of the university, as well as its legal representative and institutional image of it. The University of San Marcos has had 213 rectors since its foundation, several important and respectable people have taken over the rectorship of the university throughout the viceregal and republican era of Peru, so the rector magnificus is also a symbol of institutional continuity from the foundation to the present. The current rector of the National University of San Marcos is Mrs. Jeri Gloria Ramón Ruffner Ph.D.

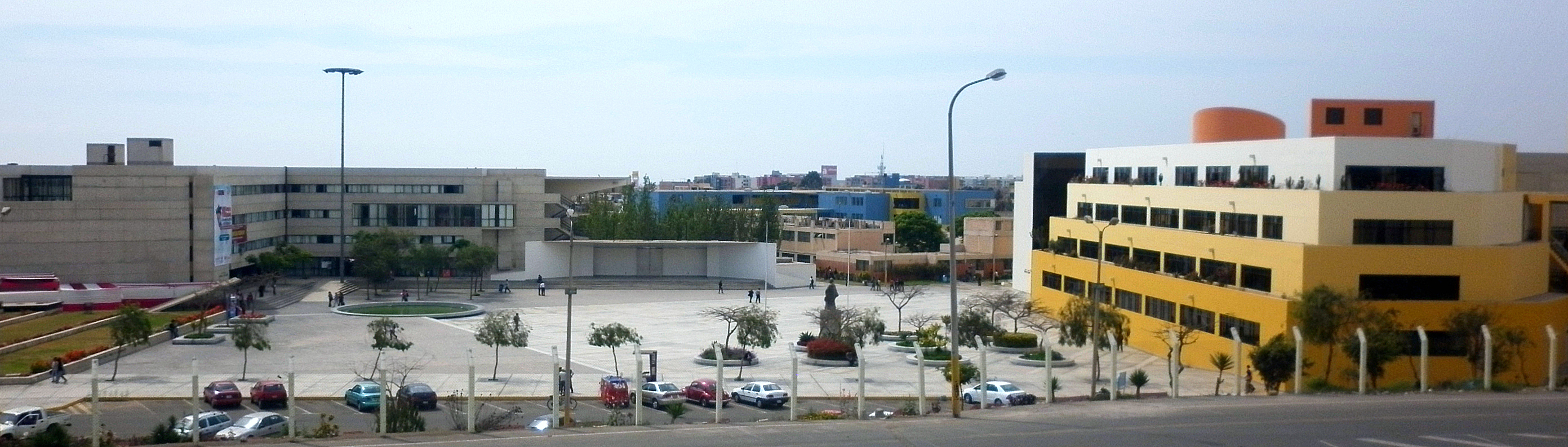
View of the main square of the University City of the University of San Marcos. On the left side is the rectory "Jorge Basadre"; to the right the central library "Pedro Zulen"; to the center the monument of Fray Tomás de San Martín.

== Service infrastructure ==
=== Central Library "Pedro Zulen" ===
From 1768 the university sought to institute (in addition to the own collections of each faculty) a central library, nevertheless, this would not come to be fully realized until 1871. Sacked during the Chilean occupation during the War of the Pacific, at the beginning of the 20th century it was He began a modernization process undertaken by the renowned librarian Pedro Zulen and the Peruvian historian Jorge Basadre, a process that achieved the reorganization and total cataloging of the titles. The current central library "Pedro Zulen" of the university is the culmination of several computerization and modernization projects. The central library operates in a 19,800 m² building, making it the largest university library in Peru and one of the largest in Latin America. It consists of four buildings linked together, has five levels and is located in the civic square of the university campus.

The building has the capacity to serve 2,500 users simultaneously. It has a multifunctional stage, 400 seats and various high-tech systems that allow surveillance by video camera, Internet connection, video conferencing systems, multimedia projectors, radio links, and professional audio and sound equipment. The library has all its automated processes, such as, for example, the acquisition of university publications, as well as the cataloging and classification of texts and resources offered by the library. The university seeks to digitize all the information of national origin that is in the library through its virtual library service, thus in the medium term it would include collections of newspapers and magazines (dating from the 18th century), books by renowned Peruvian authors, and important works that, due to their small number or being unique examples, are of restricted use. The central library "Pedro Zulen", under the auspices of UNESCO, directs the initiative to develop and implement digitalization and electronic publishing processes in the area of theses and other documents, using international standards such as OAI-PMH, TEI Lite, Dublin Core, ETD-MS, XML, among others. This initiative that has received the name of Cybertesis from the University of San Marcos is currently the largest repository in Peru.

=== Library system (SISBIB) ===
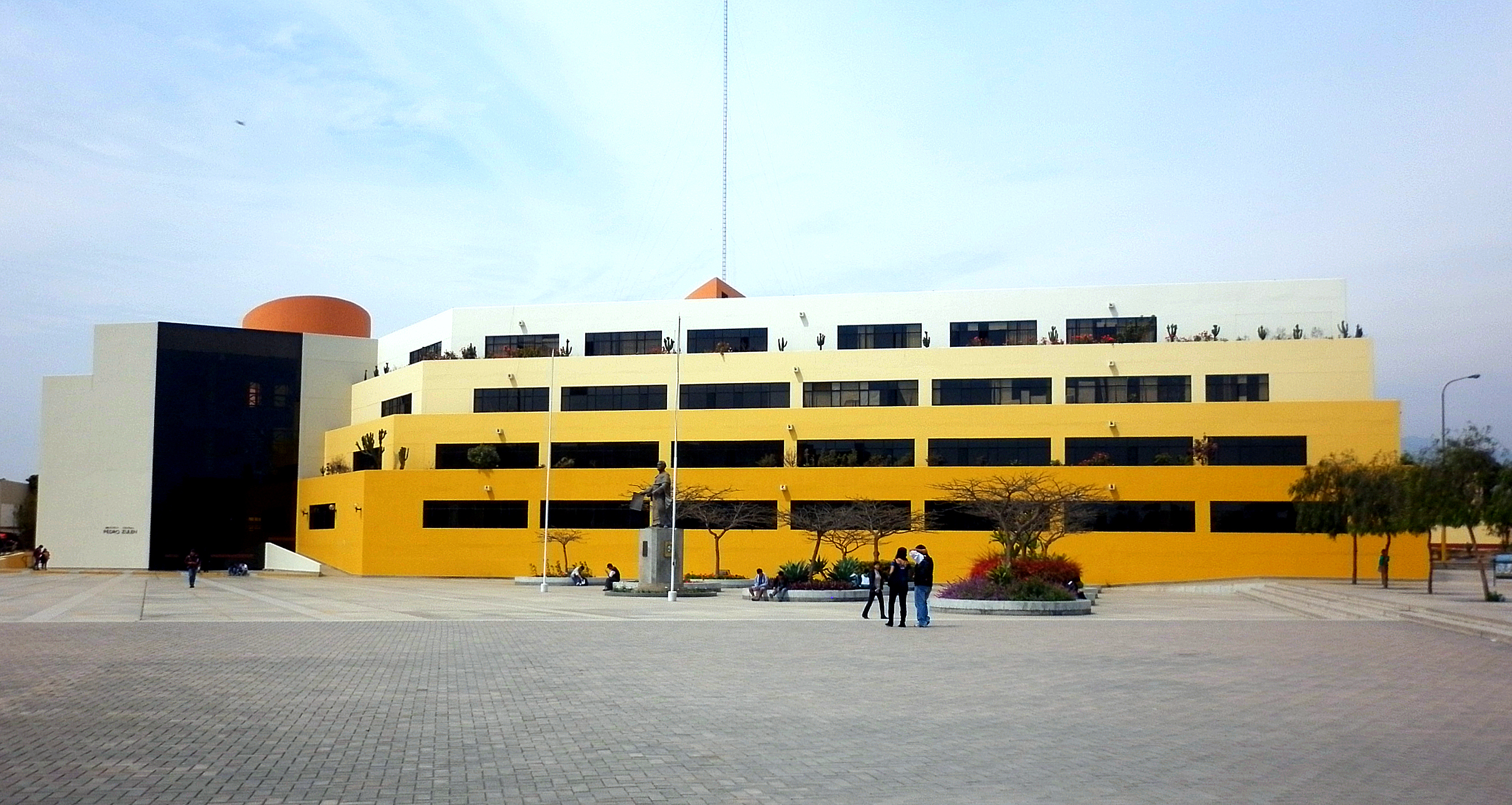
Front exterior view of the central library "Pedro Zulen". It contains manuscripts dating from the sixteenth century, years in which the University of San Marcos began to operate.

Each of the faculties of the National University of San Marcos has its own library specialized in the areas of study of each faculty, these are connected to each other through the "library system" (SISBIB) of the university. Currently, in addition to the Library System, the University of San Marcos has the "Pedro Zulen Central Library", which includes most of the titles of the university, and which directs the main activity of the SISBIB.

=== Clinic and university offices ===
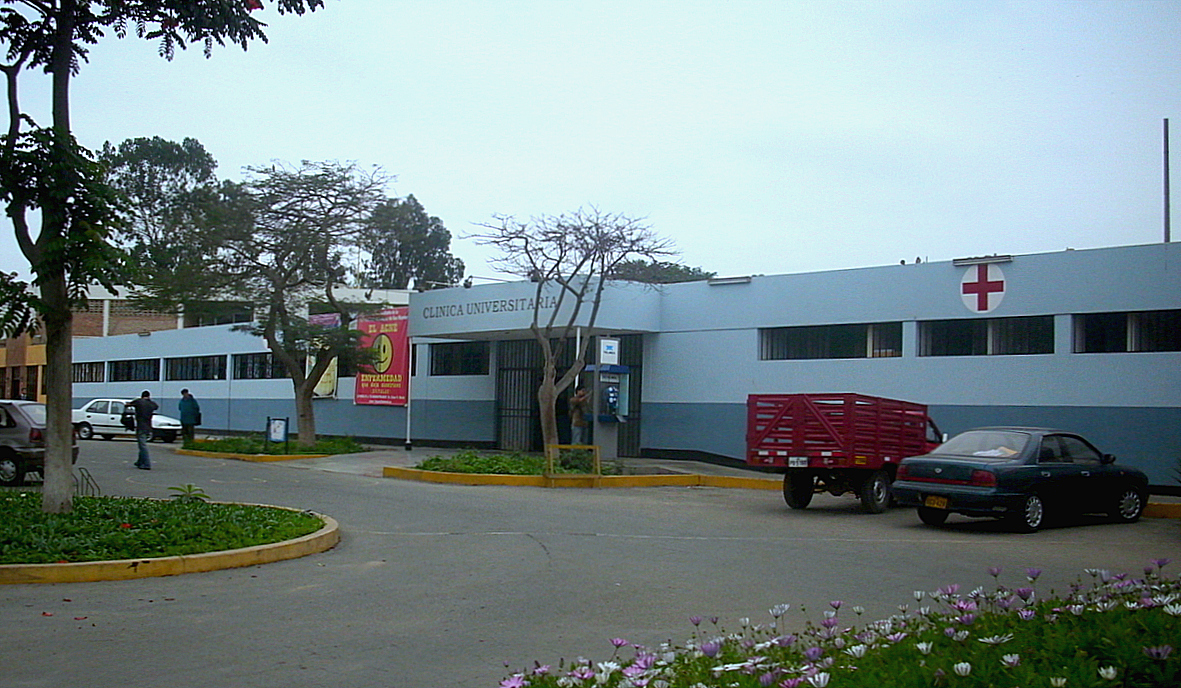
Clinic of the University of San Marcos, in it services of medical attention and doctor's offices are offered to the students, professors, workers, and to the neighboring community.

The current Clinic of the University of San Marcos, inaugurated in February 1998 reorganizing the previous clinical offices, is located within the university campus. At this health center, attention is given to students, retirees, teachers, administrative staff and the neighboring community, performing operations and other emergency cases due to trauma, burns and serious injuries. Provides pharmacy, radiology, respiratory diseases, diabetes screening, AIDS, psychology, dentistry, gynecology, etc. Regularly, in conjunction with other institutions, vaccination campaigns, blood donation, and sex education.

=== University residence ===
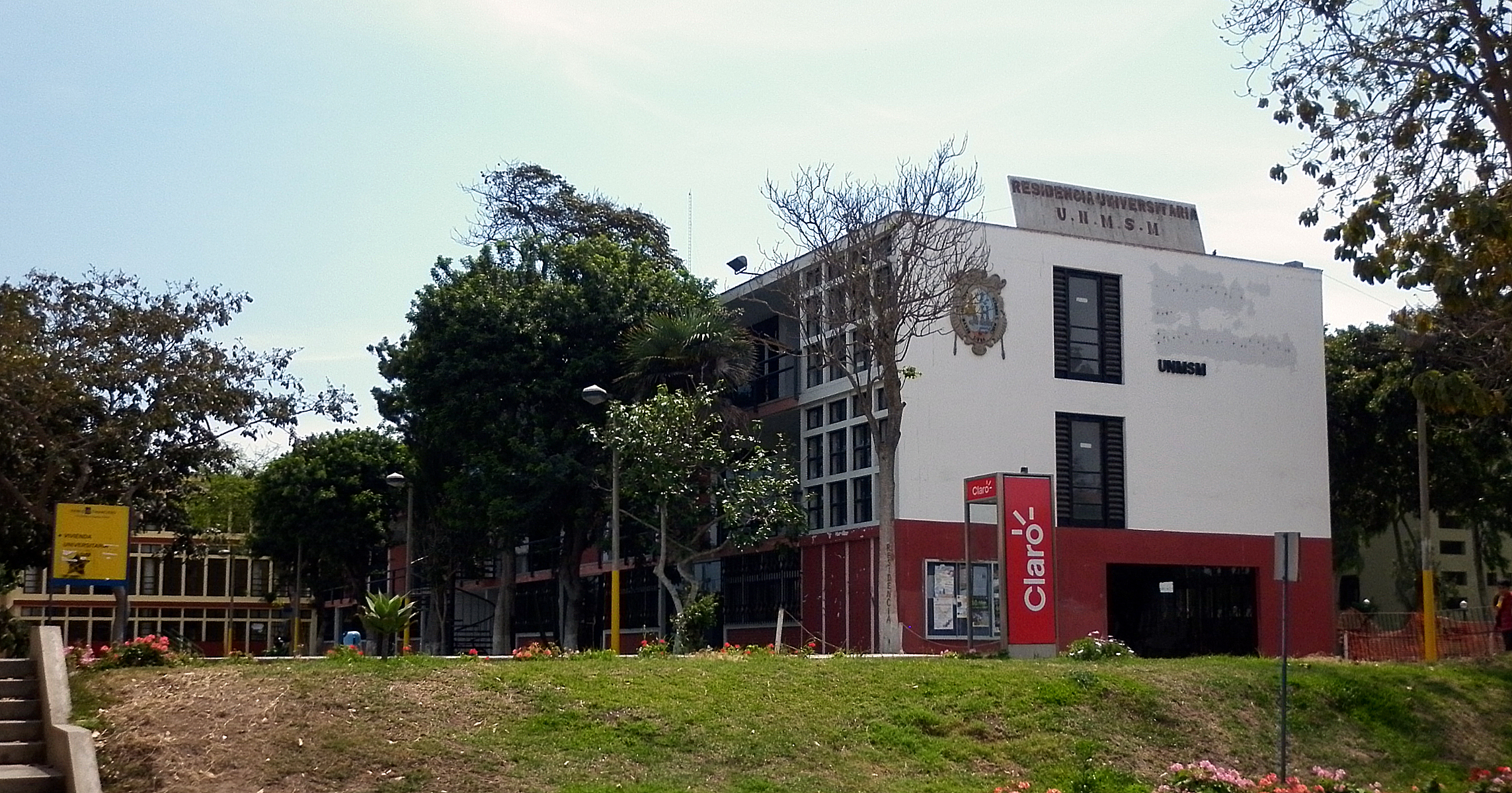
Exterior view of the Residence of the "University City". Currently, there are 102 low-income and provincial students.

The Residence of the University City is located in the main campus, between the University Avenues and Venezuela. It houses male and female students; provincial of the coast, mountain range and jungle of Peru; of all specialties. This residence currently houses 101 students.

=== Production center, bookstore and distributor ===
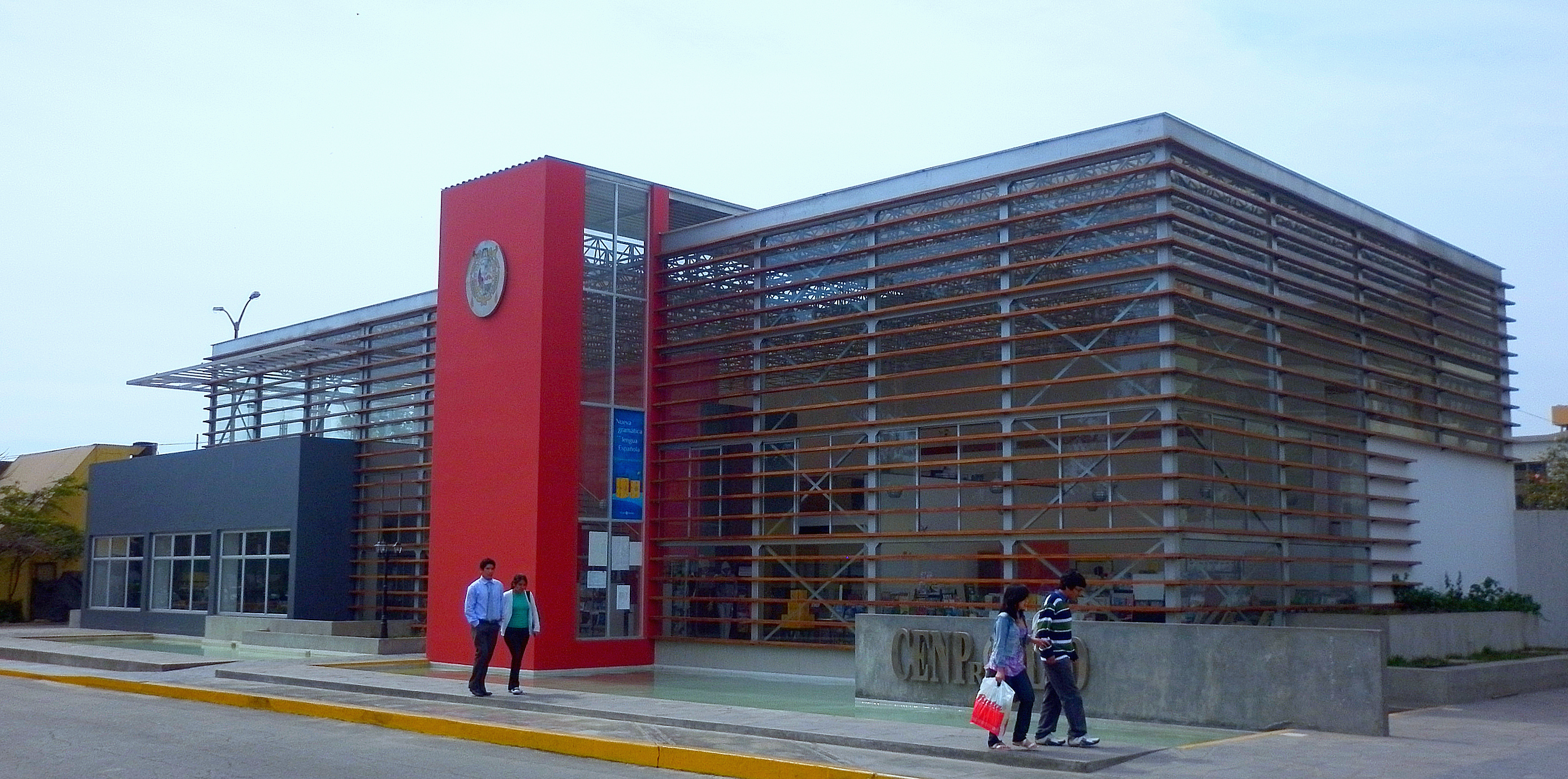
Production Center, Bookstore and Distributor of the University of San Marcos (CENPROLID), in which the books of the Editorial Fund of the UNMSM are distributed.

The Editorial Fund of the National University of San Marcos is a division of the university that is responsible for publishing books, magazines and newspapers that receive proposals made through various instances. His field of work is wide, being published not only through the traditional printed format, but also via the Internet. To buy the printed formats, you must enter the university's bookstore and production center: "CENPROLID", located on the same campus.

For a work to be published under the seal of this Fund, it must comply with the publication rules imposed for that case. You must also comply with a style manual, which the seal provides through its website.

== Sports infrastructure ==
=== Stadium of the University of San Marcos ===
The Stadium of the National University of San Marcos, also called "Monumental Stadium of San Marcos" or simply "San Marcos Stadium", is located practically in the center of the "University City". It was inaugurated in 1951 commemorating the 400 years of the university's foundation. The University Stadium has a total capacity of 67,469 people, but currently has a maximum allowed capacity of 43,000 due to evacuation problems, despite this it is one of the largest stadiums in Peru. At the moment it is the official stadium of the football team of the university, the Deportivo Universidad San Marcos, which plays in the Second Division of Peru. In addition, the stadium is used for extra-academic activities of students, teachers and administrative staff of the University of San Marcos.

== Controversy about road works ==
Since 2007, road works were carried out on the exterior of the "University City". The works imposed by the mayor Luis Castañeda of the Metropolitan Municipality of Lima were harshly questioned and rejected by thousands of students Sanmarquinos, because the former mayor intended to mutilate almost 30,000 square meters of campus, and because the construction of a road ring It would imply the disappearance of part of the green areas and of the buffer zones necessary for academic activities on campus. In 2008, specialists from the National University of Engineering and the CDL-College of Engineers of Peru joined the appropriate student request for the reformulation of the works of the municipality, noting that the road project was over-dimensioned, lacking in livelihoods technicians, it was not necessary to mutilate the campus since there were other options for traffic flows in the area. The support of several congressmen and the population put a brake on the former mayor's project. In August 2008, the works were halted by a precautionary measure of the National Institute of Culture (INC), upon finding that said works damaged part of the cultural heritage in the Huaca San Marcos.

After the management of former mayor Luis Castañeda, Sanmarquinos expect a new agreement with the incoming management of the mayor Susana Villarán (2011), which means a better benefit for the Sanmarquinos and for the neighbors, preserving the integrity of the Huaca San Marcos, conserving the buffer zone and the green areas of the campus, not incurring in unjustified constructions and achieving social license. That same year, the new municipal management recognized that the road ring is unnecessary, giving the reason to the position of the University of San Marcos that had sustenance in the evaluations of specialists of the College of Engineers of Peru and the National University of Engineering. Representatives of the university took this news in the best way, and hope to reach a conciliation with the Lima commune.

== See also ==
- National University of San Marcos
- Estadio Universidad San Marcos
- Casona of the National University of San Marcos
- Historic Centre of Lima
