= Panteón de los Próceres =

Cultural heritage site in Peru

Coordinates: 12.0541°S 77.0325°W

Church of San Carlos (Panteón de los Próceres)
- Iglesia de San Carlos
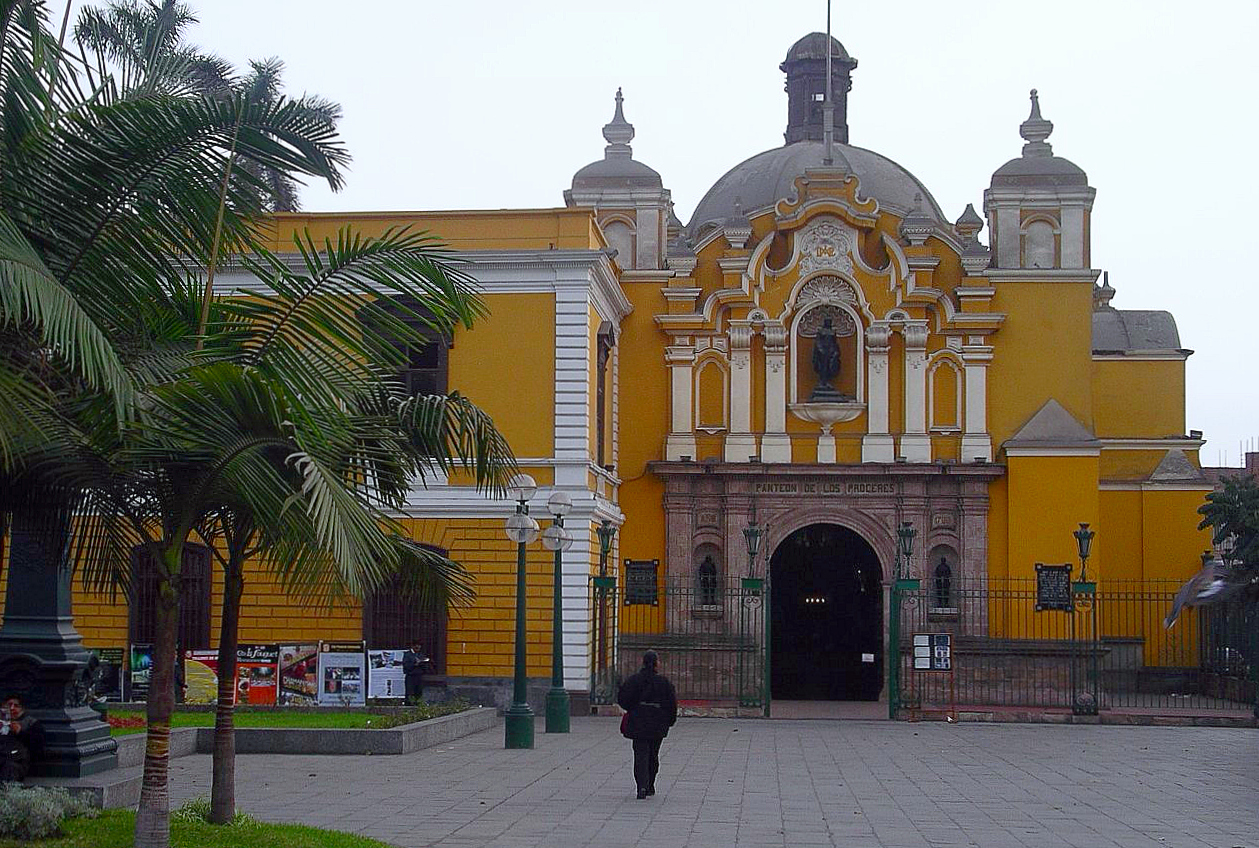

Religion
- Affiliation: Catholic
- Governing body: Archdiocese of Lima

Location
- Location: University of San Marcos
- Interactive map of Church of San Carlos (Panteón de los Próceres)

Architecture
- Style: Spanish colonial
- Completed: 1765

The Panteón de los Próceres (English: Heroes' Pantheon) is a crypt inside the old Church of San Carlos, located at the former Real Convictorio de San Carlos in the historic centre of Lima, that holds the remains of 24 of the national heroes of the Peruvian War of Independence.

== History ==
The Jesuit novitiate of San Antonio Abad was established in Lima in 1608, funded by the merchant Antonio Correa Ureña, and the church was dedicated in his honour. The first stone of the rebuilt church was laid on 11 May 1758, following destruction in the 1746 Lima–Callao earthquake, and construction was completed in 1766 following a Latin cross plan designed by Cristóbal de Vargas. The church was formally inaugurated on 17 January 1765.

After Charles III of Spain expelled the Jesuits from all Spanish territories in 1767, the church was renamed San Carlos — a reference to the king himself rather than any saint — and the complex became the Convictorio de San Carlos, a secular educational institution. In 1876 its assets passed to the Universidad Nacional Mayor de San Marcos.

The transformation into a pantheon was the initiative of President Augusto B. Leguía and his Patria Nueva political movement, who came to power in 1919 and sought to rebuild Peruvian national identity around the centenary of independence. Leguía commissioned French architect Claude Sahut, who had arrived in Peru in 1907, to adapt the church for the purpose. Sahut removed the Jesuit saints from the facade niches, replacing them with a sculpture of the Madre Patria by Peruvian sculptor Artemio Ocaña, and inscribed the new name in golden letters above the entrance arch. He adapted the existing underground crypt, redesigning it with a circular plan and installing a skylight of nearly four metres in diameter connecting it visually to the dome above the transept. The Pantheon was created by Supreme Decree on 29 June 1921 and solemnly inaugurated on 10 December 1924, on the occasion of the first centenary of the Battles of Junín and Ayacucho.

The interior features murals by José Sabogal on the four pendentives of the crossing dome, depicting the virtues of fortitude, justice, prudence and temperance — allegorical qualities of the hero — painted in tempera on a gold ground and reflecting the influence of Mexican muralism, particularly Diego Rivera's work, which Sabogal had encountered during a visit to Mexico in 1922. In 1971, under the government of Juan Velasco Alvarado, Teodoro Núñez Ureta painted a mural titled La independencia del Perú on the interior wall above the former choir loft. It was integrated into the Centro de Estudios Histórico Militares del Perú as a Patriotic Sanctuary by Supreme Decree N.º 9–GM of 21 August 1953.

In 2024, PROLIMA announced the restoration of the church, including recovery of the original facade stonework and restoration of the main altarpiece.

== Burials ==
Here, the remains of 24 independence heroes and 41 effigies are preserved.

=== Remains ===
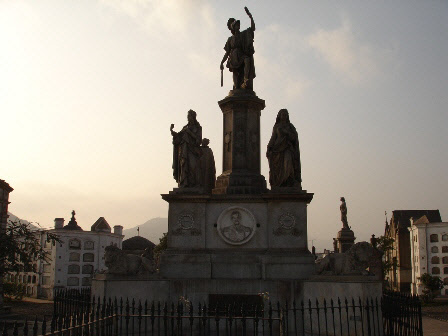
Tomb of Ramón Castilla within the Pantheon of the Próceres.

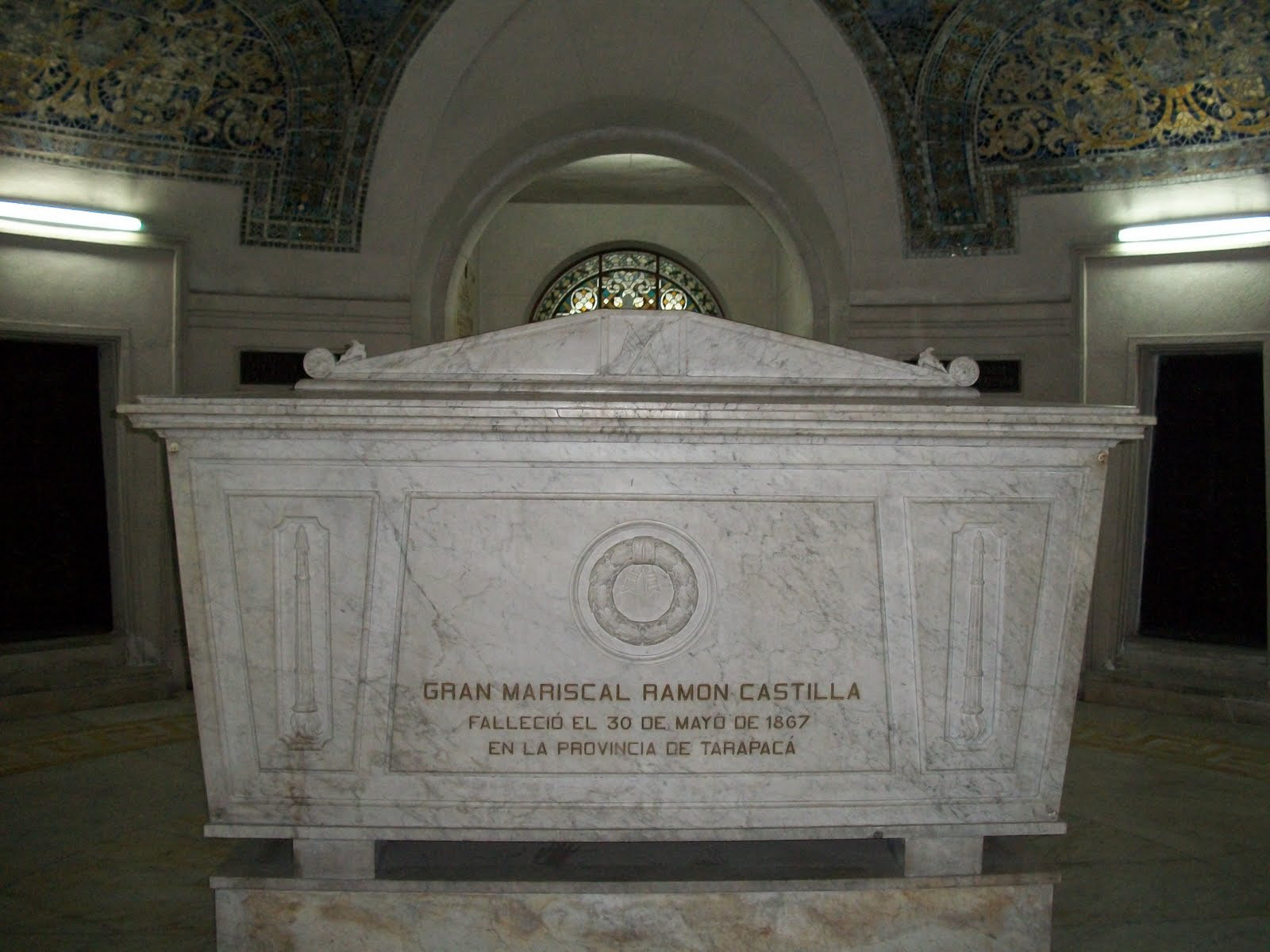
Mausoleum of the tomb of Ramón Castilla, in the Presbítero Maestro Cemetery.

Among the remains of heroes are:

- Ramón Castilla
- Hipólito Unanue
- Pascual Saco Oliveros
- José Andrés Rázuri
- José Bernardo Alcedo
- José de la Torre Ugarte
- Martin George Guisse
- Guillermo Miller
- Francisco Vidal
- Domingo Nieto
- Juan Espinosa de los Monteros
- Mariano Necochea
- Juana de Dios Manrique
- Narciso de la Colina

=== Effigies ===
Among the effigies are:

- José de San Martín
- Simón Bolívar
- Túpac Amaru II
- Micaela Bastidas
- Guillermo Miller
