= German Tower, Lima =

Clock tower in Lima, Peru

German Tower
- Torre Alemana
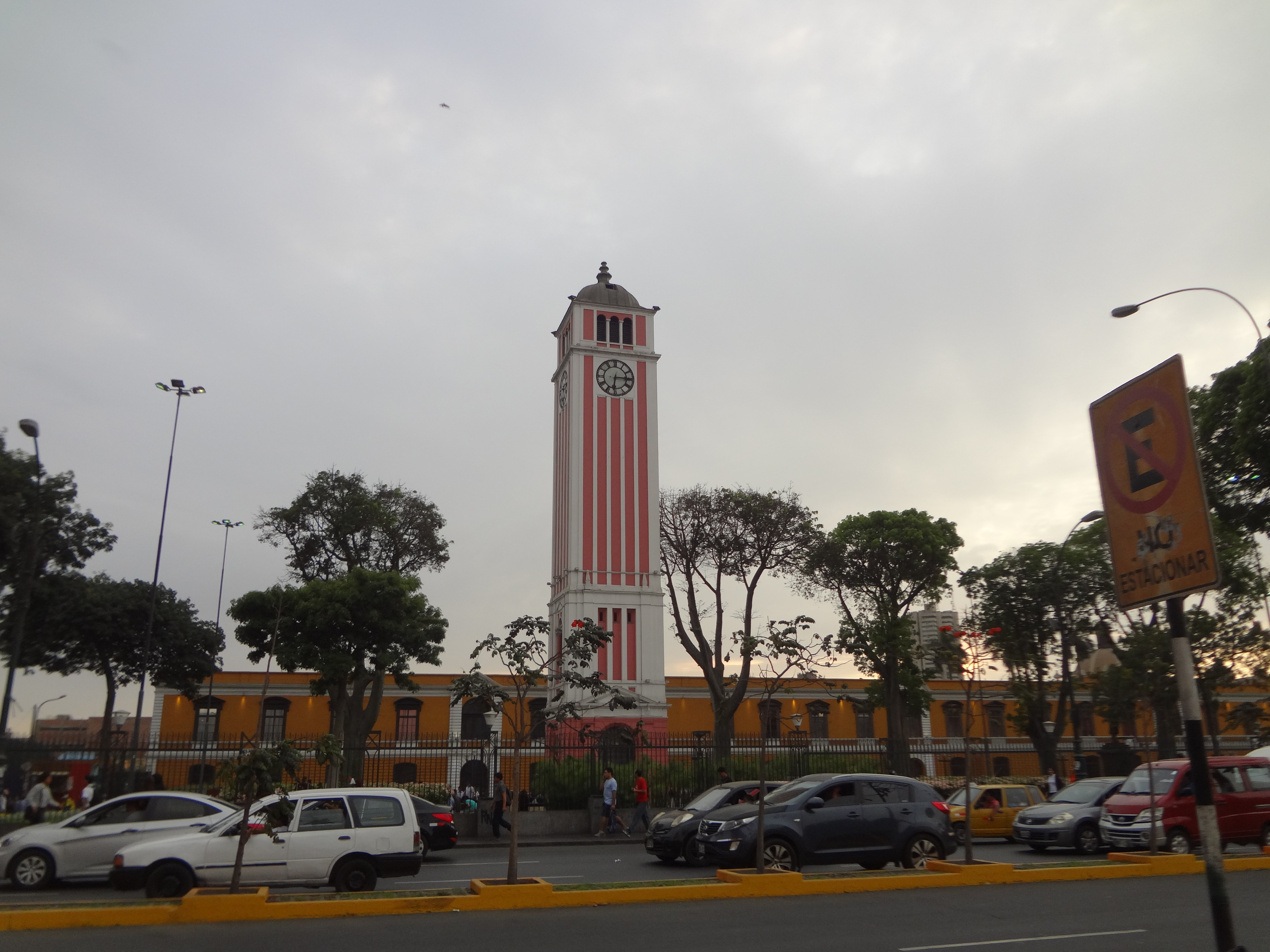
- The clock tower in 2011
- Interactive map of German Tower
- Location: University Park, Lima
- Coordinates: 12°03′15″S 77°01′53″W
- Designer: Friedrich Jordan Barkholtz
- Type: Clock tower
- Height: 29 metres
- Beginning date: July 30, 1921
- Completion date: July 10, 1923

The German Tower (Spanish: Torre Alemana), also known as the Clock Tower (Spanish: Torre del Reloj) or the University Clock (Spanish: Reloj Universitario), is a clock tower in the historic centre of Lima, Peru. It is located in front of the Casona de la Universidad Nacional Mayor de San Marcos, in the University Park at the intersection of Abancay and Nicolás de Piérola avenues. It was donated in 1921 by the German community in Lima, on the occasion of the Centennial of the Independence of Peru. At twelve in the day and at six in the afternoon, its chimes played the first stanza of the National Anthem of Peru.

== History ==
The German Tower was built as a gift from the resident German colony to commemorate the Centennial of the Independence of Peru. The German ambassador, Hans Paul von Humboldt-Dachroeden, commented that "a strong bond between both peoples and governments would be built and it would help to maintain and foster mutual understanding and friendship."

The construction of the clock tower was in charge of the German architect Friedrich Jordan Barkholtz (a native of Hamburg) and the engineering firm Dunkelberg and Pellry, who together with the German ambassador, the most notorious German families residing in Lima, in Chanchamayo and the mayor of the city, Pedro Pablo Mujica Carassa, celebrated the laying ceremony of the first stone on July 30, 1921. The Archbishop of Lima, Monsignor Emilio Lissón, also participated in said ceremony.

Although the German colony initially requested authorization to occupy land in the Park of the Exhibition, a place where a Lookout Tower would be built, it was built in 1922 in the University Park, where it is to this day.

On April 10, 1922, it was agreed, through a session chaired by Mayor Pedro Rada y Gamio, to officiate at the Foundation Company, so that the university park would be in presentable condition at the inauguration of the tower.

The Clock Tower was inaugurated on July 10, 1923; the first intervention was carried out on October 15, 1937, in which the clock was repaired by Antenor Z. Alvarado, and later in 1969 an attempt was made to repair it again.

== Gallery ==
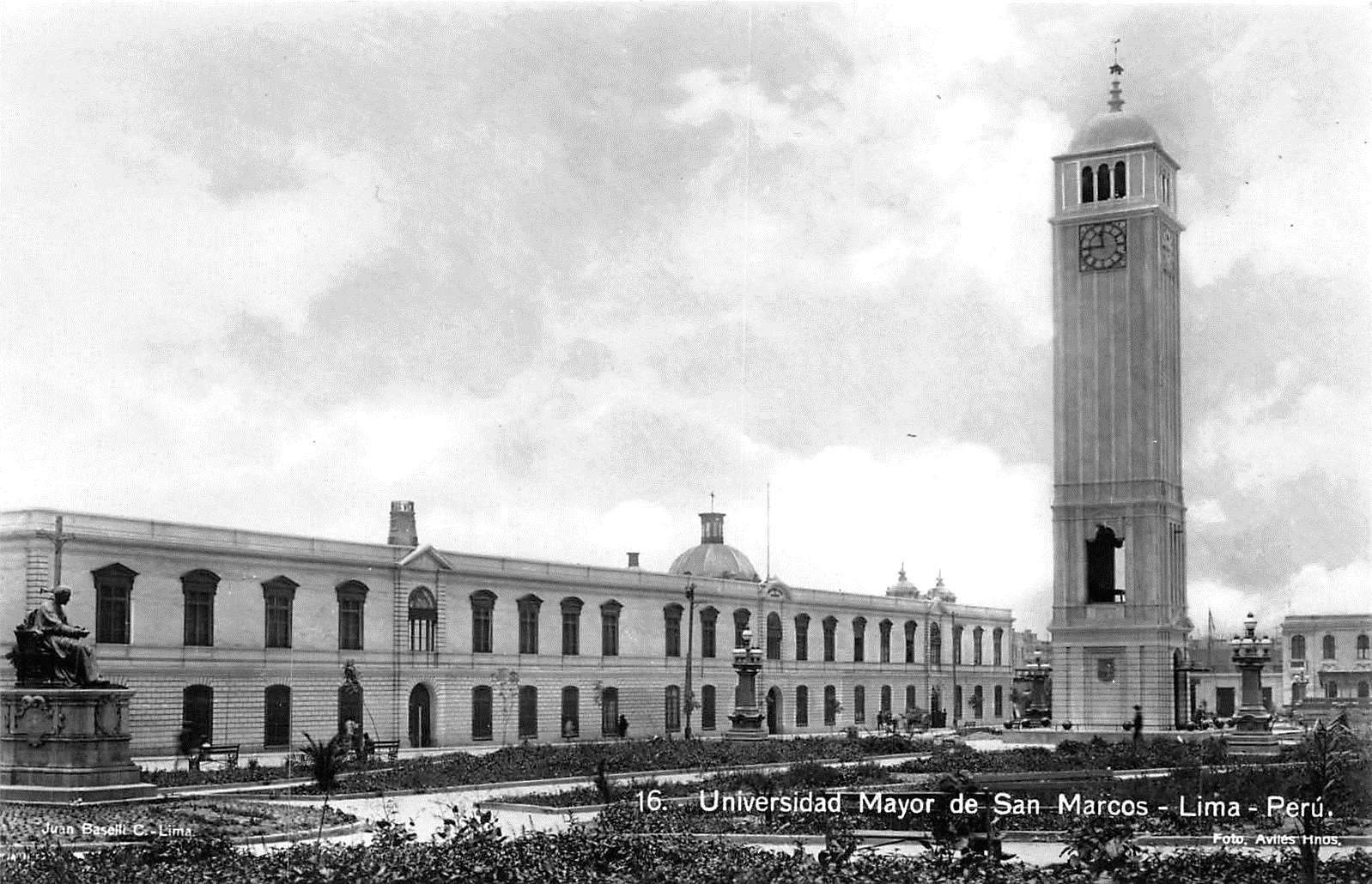
The tower and its surroundings in 1924

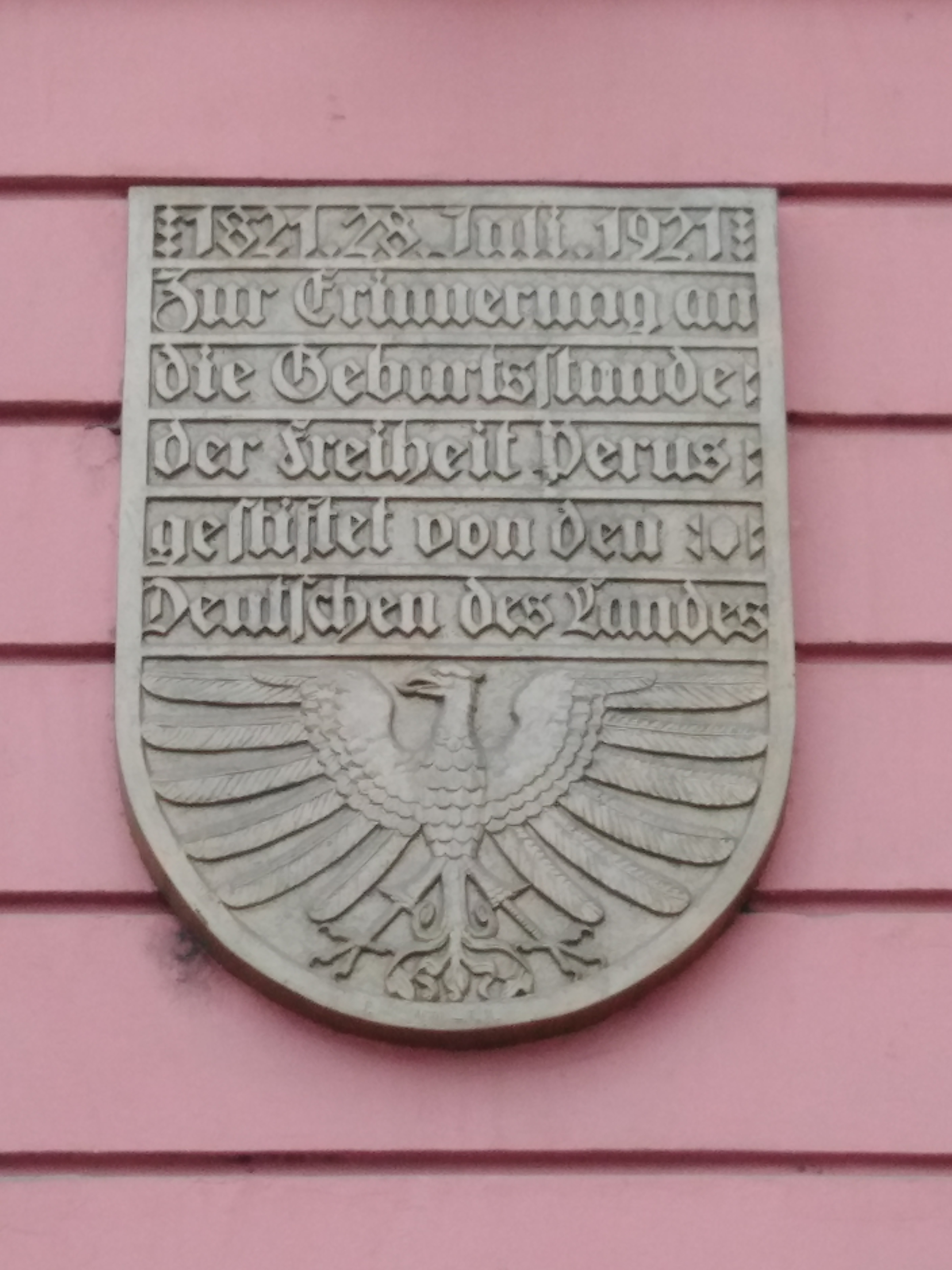
The tower's plaque in German

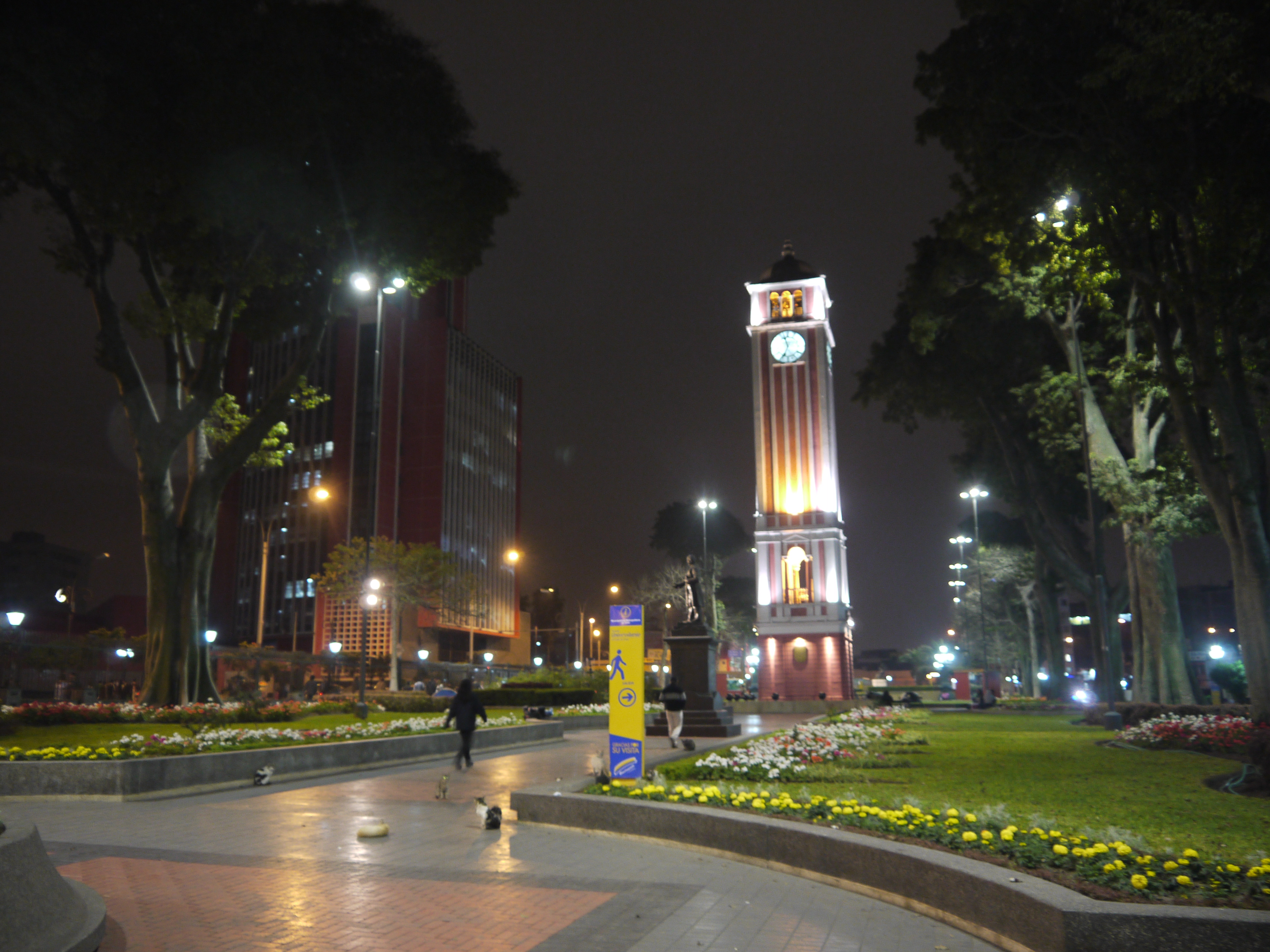
The tower at night

== See also ==
- University Park, where the tower is located
- Casona of the National University of San Marcos, located next to the park
