= Convictorio de San Carlos =

College in Lima, Peru

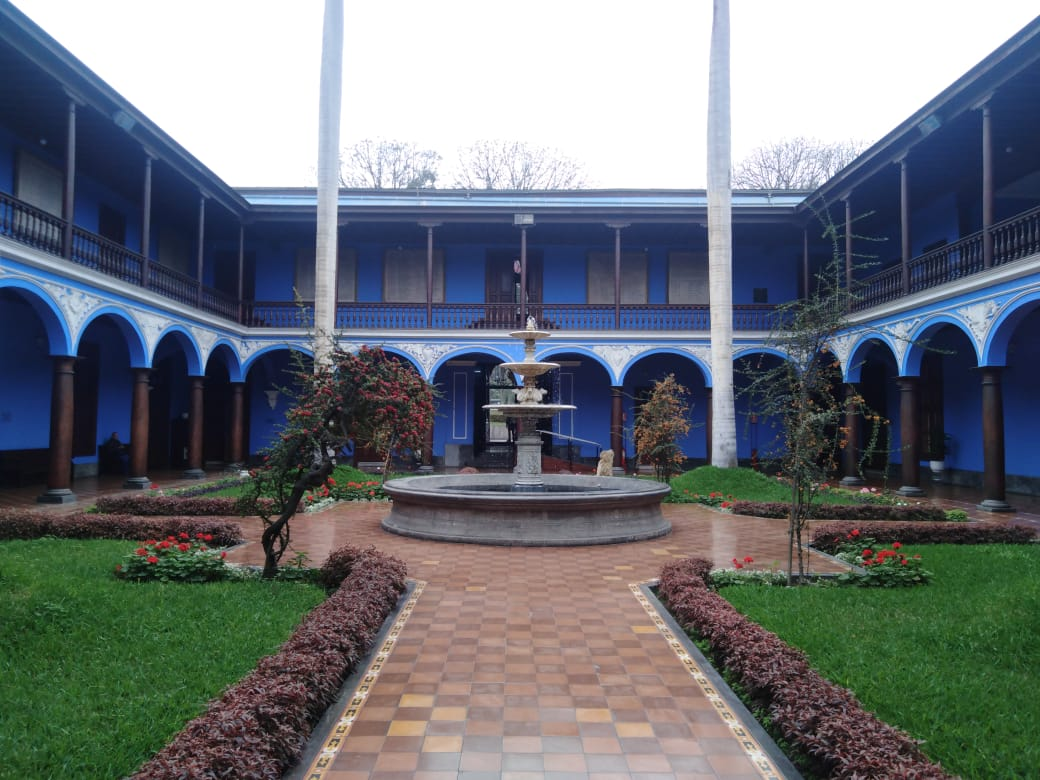
Courtyard of the Casona.

The Real Convictorio de San Carlos, or Convictorio de San Carlos after independence, was a college in Lima created at the end of the Viceroyalty of Peru and which survived until the first decades of the Peruvian Republic.

It was housed at the Casona de la Universidad Nacional Mayor de San Marcos. A conservative school, it had a longstanding rivalry with the more liberal Guadalupe College.

It was established in 1770 by a royal decree of Viceroy Manuel de Amat y Junyent that merged the defunct colleges of San Martín and San Felipe after the expulsion of the Jesuits. It was closed in October 1817, but later reopened after the independence of Peru, in 1822. After its reopening, it worked without issues until 1866, when it became the Faculty of Letters and Human Sciences of the National University of San Marcos.

== Notable alumni ==
- Antonio Arenas
- Luis Germán Astete
- Benjamín Boza
- Manuel Candamo
- José Gálvez Egúsquiza
- Manuel María Gálvez Egúsquiza
- Pedro Gálvez Egúsquiza
- Aurelio García y García
- Manuel González Prada
- Manuel Menéndez
- Bernardo O'Higgins
- José Joaquín de Olmedo
- Ricardo Palma
- Manuel Pardo y Lavalle
- Juan Antonio Pezet
- Juan Antonio Ribeyro Estrada
- Felipe Santiago Salaverry
- José Bernardo de Tagle
- Manuel Irigoyen Larrea

== See also ==
- National University of San Marcos
- Casona of the National University of San Marcos
