= Dora Mayer =

German-born activist and essayist on Peruvian topics (1868–1959)

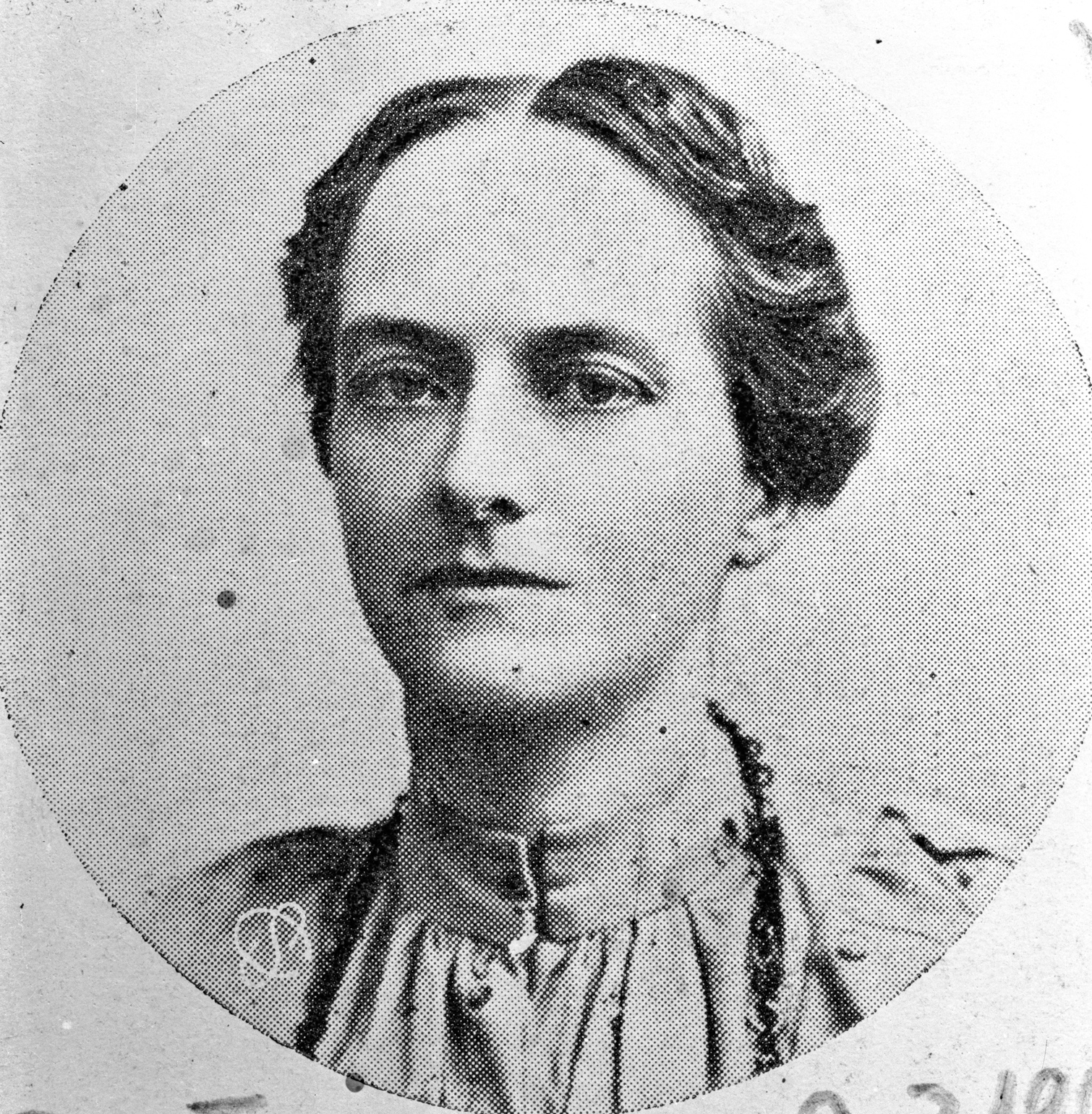
- Dora Mayer in 1903
- Born: Dora Mayer Loehrs; March 12, 1868; Hamburg, German Confederation
- Died: January 7, 1959 (aged 90); Lima, Peru
- Occupations: Writer, journalist, philosopher, human rights activist
- Known for: Early defender of Indigenous rights in Peru; co-founder of the Asociación Pro-Indígena
- Notable work: El indígena y su derecho
- Movement: Indigenismo, Humanism, Feminism

Dora Mayer (12 March 1868 – 7 January 1959) was an activist, essayist, and intellectual, who championed the rights of indigenous people in Peru.

== Early life ==
Dora Mayer was born in Hamburg, Germany, the daughter of Anatol Mayer, a merchant, and Mathilde de Loehrs.The family moved to Callao, Peru in April 1873. Educated at home, Mayer was a motivated autodidact, reading widely, and writing novels, plays, essays, and articles.

== Activism ==
Mayer wrote on women's rights, philosophy, social concerns, and 'extensively in denunciation of the endless abuses of landowners and authorities, and the absence of effective labor legislation' for the indigenous people of Peru. As a journalist, she contributed to numerous publications and edited four herself: El Deber Pro Indígena, La Crítica ,Concordia and El Trabajo.

Like many other pro-indigenous activists of the time, Mayer was influenced by Manuel González Prada. In his 1905 manifesto Nuestros Indios (Our Indians), Prada had argued that indigenous Peruvians had been ravaged by exploitation and discriminatory attitudes and practices, rather than inherently doomed by their perceived racial inferiority. In 1909, Mayer co-founded the Asociación Pro-Indígena, or Pro-Indigenous Association, with philosopher Pedro Zulen and sociologist Joaquín Capelo. According to Frank Salomon, the Association worked principally through legal assistance and research, and 'invoked the Indians' status as legally entitled, though disenfranchised, citizens in order to win them such rights as protection from debt imprisonment.' Though 'humanitarian, altruistic, and moral,' the organisation was 'unable to solve the problem of indigenous exploitation'. The group ultimately devolved in 1917. It was, however, a notable precursor to the burgeoning Indigenismo movement, which gained momentum in the 1920s. Mayer was later a supporter of the Tahuantinsuyo Indigenous Rights Committee (active 1919-1925).

In 1911, Mayer prepared a paper for the First Universal Races Congress in London concerning the treatment of indigenous people in Peru. The abstract of her paper, as described in a pamphlet produced for the Congress, read in part:

The natives of Peru have been accused of dishonesty, hypocrisy, and idleness. It is a fact that modern civilisation has corrupted, rather than improved, them. European employers have done nothing, either from the material or moral point of view, to uplift and civilise them; on the contrary, they have merely set them an example of immorality... The Peruvians, nevertheless, have all the qualities of the cultivator; if they were given the means of developing these qualities and exploiting the natural wealth of their soil, it would mean their salvation, and further the progress of the country.

In 1913, in her capacity as President of the Press Committee of the Pro-Indigenous Association, Mayer published The conduct of the Cerro de Pasco mining company. In it, she notes that although the initial operations of the North American mining company were legitimate:

as the company became initiated into the secrets of the judicial and political habits of the country, it made up its mind to take advantage of the frailties which unfortunately are to be found in our social system, and entered fully into the ways of fraud, bribery and violence... We would make no remark upon the easy corruption of the businessmen who arrived here, if the Anglo-Saxon peoples did not brag so much about their moral superiority over the South-Americans and started in their diplomacy from the idea that, whilst protecting their countrymen in the exterior, they were defending the cause of civilization and morality.

Mayer went on to describe the company's 'inhumane conduct towards the aboriginal workmen' it employed. She was a staunch critic of the abusive or exploitative practices of transnational companies, from both social and environmental angles.

== Women's rights ==
On the role of women in society, Mayer prized the role of the homemaker, but acknowledged the disadvantages for women of domestic work being insufficiently recognised. She argued that:

In the current moment power depends on economic conditions, and in this respect women once again find themselves at a disadvantage, because their labor as homemaker is not assigned mercantile value [...] It may be indispensable to give wives and mothers a wage in order to make men understand that they are not simply 'giving' women half of their fortunes, but rather that work done in the feminine world is as important as that of the man's.

== Relationship with Pedro Zulen ==
Pedro Zulen, twenty-two years younger than Mayer but for many years her 'partner in indigenista activism', reportedly rebuffed her romantic advances repeatedly. Nevertheless, she was public in her passion for him, and in published works from 1920 onwards, used the name 'Dora Mayer de Zulen'. This is also the name used on her tombstone.

== Death and legacy ==
Dora Mayer died in Peru on 7 January 1959, at the age of 91. In 2019, philosopher Joel Rojas edited a collection of Mayer's writings entitled The Sun that Dispels the Clouds: Essential texts, and an exhibition was held in Lima about her life and work. In the same year, the National University of San Marcos embarked on a project to digitise Mayer's materials held in their archives.
