= Royal College of the University of San Marcos =

Historical building in Lima, Peru

Royal College of the UNMSM
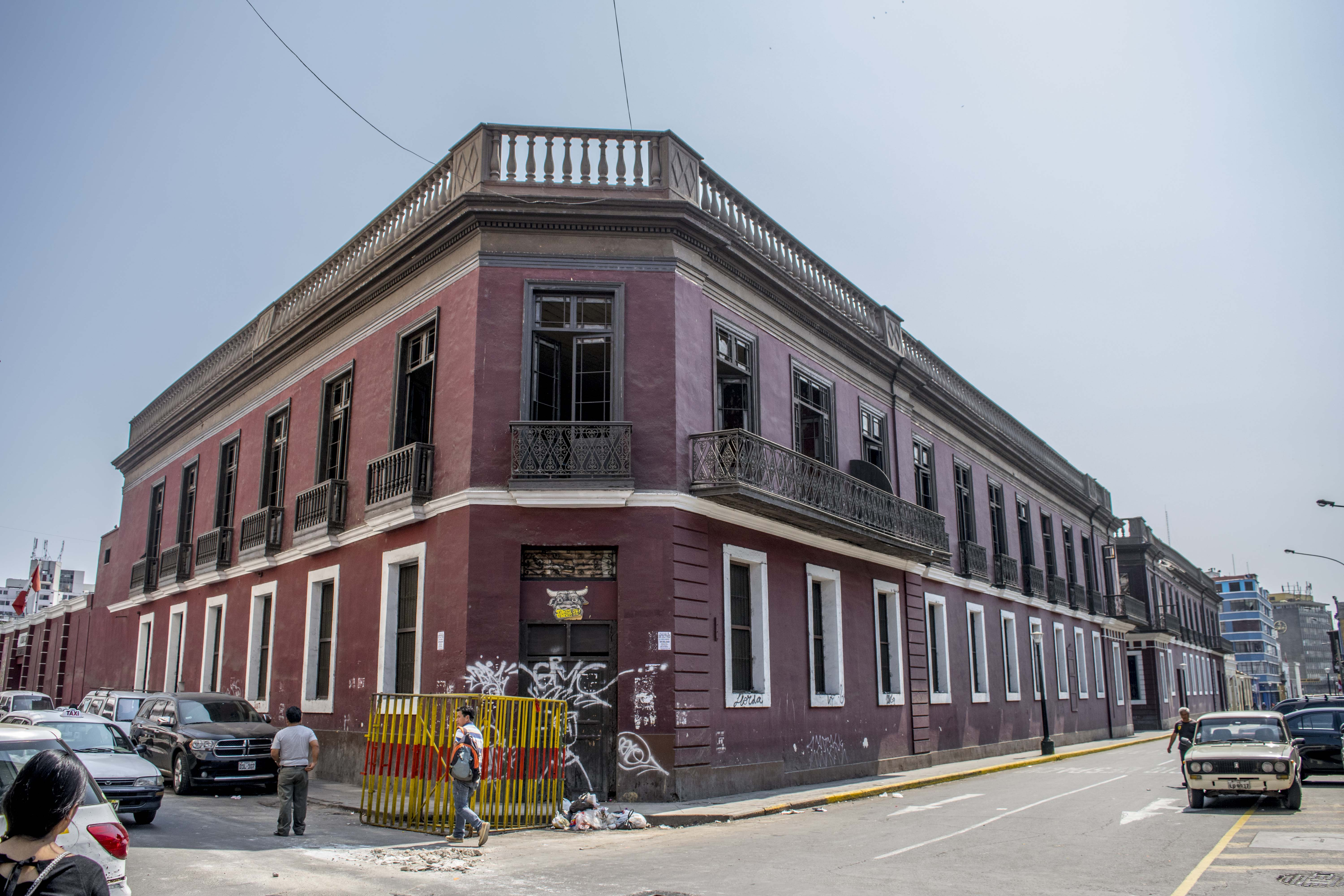
- The building in 2017
- Interactive map of the Royal College of the UNMSM area

General information
- Year built: Late 16th century
- Inaugurated: June 28, 1592

The Royal College of the University of San Marcos (Spanish: Colegio Real de la Universidad Nacional Mayor de San Marcos, CRSM), also known by its former name of Royal College of San Felipe (Spanish: Colegio Real San Felipe), is a historic building in the Barrios Altos neighbourhood of Lima, Peru. It's one of two cultural centres operated by the University of San Marcos.

The premises of the Royal College date back to the colonial period, and are located next to the Congress of Peru. It is made up of three departments of the university: The Institute of Applied Linguistics "CILA", the "Domingo Angulo" Historical Archive, and the Andean Rural History Seminar. Exhibitions and displays are held regularly, which mainly take place in the exhibition hall of the building.

== History ==
The Royal College of San Felipe and San Marcos was inaugurated on June 28, 1592, by Viceroy García Hurtado de Mendoza, 5th Marquis of Cañete. After the expulsion of the Jesuits in 1767, the building was used as a military barracks from 1781 to the early republican era. In 1860, it became the School of Arts and Crafts (Spanish: Escuela de Artes y Oficios), and in 1960, under the rectorship of Luis Alberto Sánchez, it became property of the university. It was declared part of the Cultural heritage of Peru in 1972. The School of Arts and Crafts later moved to Grau Avenue.

== See also ==
- Casona of the National University of San Marcos
