= Pedro Zulen =

Peruvian librarian (1889–1925)

Pedro Salvino Zulen Aymar
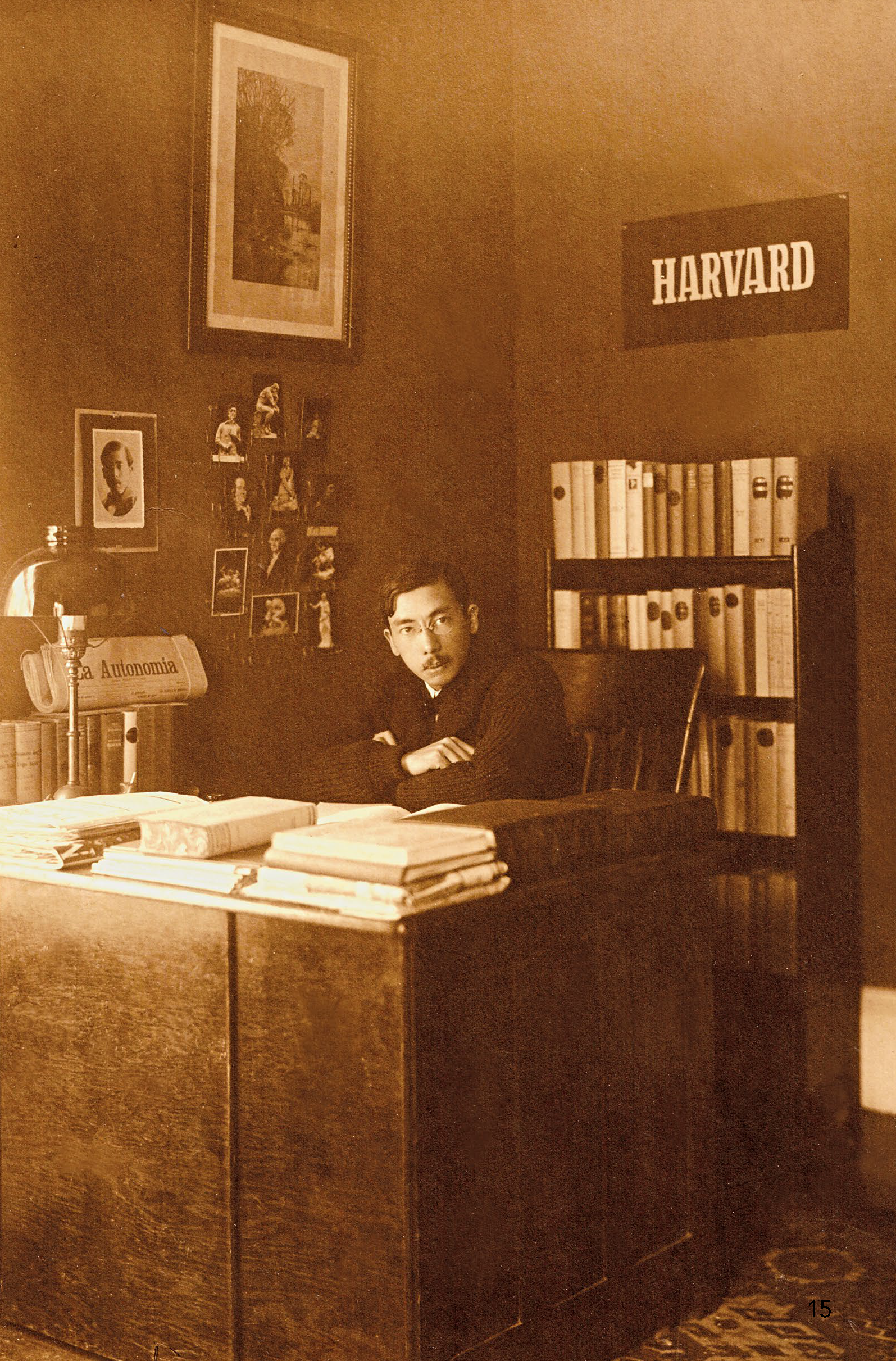
- Born: October 12, 1889; Lima, Peru
- Died: January 27, 1925 (aged 35); Lima, Peru

Academic background
- Education: National University of San Marcos; Harvard University
- Thesis: From neo-Hegelianism to neo-realism: a study of philosophical trends in England and the United States from the introduction of Hegel to the current neo-Realist reaction

Academic work
- Discipline: philosophy library science
- Institutions: University of San Marcos

Pedro Salvino Zulen Aymar (October 12, 1889 - January 27, 1925) was a Peruvian philosopher and librarian of Chinese descent, who dedicated the most part of his short life to the fight for decentralised politics and the defense of indigenous rights.

== Early life and education ==
Son of Pedro Francisco Zulen and Petronila Aymar, on leaving the school directed by notable educator Pedro A. Labarthe, he entered the Faculty of Sciences of the National University of San Marcos in 1906 where he specialised in Natural Sciences and Mathematics. In 1909 he decided to transfer to the Faculty of Arts, focusing particularly on the study of philosophy. In 1912 he enrolled in the Faculty of Law.

He was the promoter and one of the founders of the Pro-Indigenous Association in 1909, and held the role of general secretary until 1915, although his resignation from the institution was not made public until the following year.

In 1916 he travelled to the United States in order to undertake post-graduate studies in Philosophy at Harvard University, but his ill health (he suffered from tuberculosis) lead to his abandoning the attempt soon after classes began. He decided to return to Peru and settle in the city of Jauja, Junín Region, with two aims: to improve his health and, most of all, to leave Lima because of the harassment of Dora Mayer, an old Pro-Indigenous Association colleague. In 1919 he decided to run as a substitute delegate for Jauja province, but was arrested just before the election and sent to the regional capital, Cerro de Pasco, accused of anarchism and instigating rebellion amongst the peasantry. This all took place thanks to the conspiring of his political enemies, who thus prevented his candidacy.

== Career ==
With his studies completed and having graduated with a BA that same year, he travelled to the United States for the second time in 1920 with the aim of restarting his previous university course at Harvard. As well as his academic studies in Philosophy, he also studied what would later become known as library sciences on his own account. He returned to Peru towards the end of 1923, having been appointed cataloger of the Library of the University of San Marcos the year before, and soon after becoming its acting director. Here he worked full-time on cataloguing the Library's collection of bibliographies, editing the "Boletín Bibliográfico" and completely reorganising the institution. Because of this work he is considered to be one of the pioneers or founders of Peruvian library science, and since 2002 the Central Library of the University of San Marcos has been named after him.

In 1924 he graduated as a Doctor of Arts and was named, by request of his students, as assistant professor in the Faculty of Arts, teaching a course on Psychology and Logic which he completely rewrote based on his studies and academic experiences in North America. After his death, a letter from the British philosopher Bertrand Russell reached Lima, congratulating him on the contents of his doctoral thesis and asking him if the Peruvian philosophical movement was at the same level.

Zulen published only two works during his lifetime - his university theses - while two further texts were published posthumously by his mother and Dora Mayer. Apart from these books, there were also innumerable newspaper articles on indigenous rights, decentralisation and university reform - Zulen himself had tried on two occasions to publish a selection of these in Spain (under the title of Gamonalismo y centralismo or Exploitation and Centralism), but without success.

== Works ==
- La Filosofía de lo inexpresable: bosquejo de una interpretación y una crítica de la filosofía de Bergson (Philosophy of the inexpressible: outline of an interpretation and criticism of the philosophy of Bergson). Lima: Talleres Tipográficos de Sanmartí y Cía., 1920. (This was his undergraduate Arts thesis.)
- Del neohegelianismo al neorealismo: estudio de las corrientes filosóficas en Inglaterra y los Estados Unidos desde la introducción de Hegel hasta la actual reacción neorealista (From neo-Hegelianism to neo-realism: a study of philosophical trends in England and the United States from the introduction of Hegel to the current neo-Realist reaction). Lima: Imprenta Lux de E.L. Castro, 1924. (This was his doctoral Arts thesis.)
- Programas de Psicología y Lógica (Programs of Psychology and Logic). Lima: Impr. Garcilaso, 1925. (Summary of his 1924 University lectures on this topic.)
- El olmo incierto de la nevada (The uncertain elm of the snow). Lima: J.E. Chenkey, 1930. (Posthumous edition of his poems published by Dora Mayer.)

== Bibliography ==
- DEL CASTILLO MORAN, Miguel Angel. "Pedro S. Zulen, intelectual del 900: su paso por la Universidad de San Marcos". En: Richard Chuhue, Li Jing Na y Antonio Coello (eds.), La inmigración china al Perú: arqueología, historia y sociedad, pp. 367–378, Instituto Confucio, Universidad Ricardo Palma, Lima, 2012.
- DEL CASTILLO MORAN, Miguel Angel y Moscoso Carbajal, María. "El chino y el indio: Pedro S. Zulen y Julio C. Tello, una amistad del novecientos a través de su correspondencia, 1914-1922". En: Arqueología y Sociedad, No. 14, pp. 165–188, Museo de Arqueología y Antropología, Universidad Nacional Mayor de San Marcos, Lima, 2002.
- LAZARTE OYAGUE, Saby Evelyn (2014). El pensamiento filosófico de Pedro Zulen:Educación, hombre y filosofía. Lima:Universidad Ricardo Palma. Editorial Universitaria.
- LAZARTE OYAGUE, Saby Evelyn. “La educación desde la perspectiva de Pedro Zulen”. En Revista Educativa Identidad.De la Facultad de Ciencias de la Educación de la Universidad Nacional Hermilio Valdizan, Huánuco, Vol.1. year 1. N°01, December 2012. ISSN 2306-4072.
- LAZARTE OYAGUE, Saby Evelyn. “La realidad peruana en Pedro Zulen: De la independencia al centenario”. En Revista de Filosofía en el Perú. Pensamiento e Ideas. REFP. Year 1, No. 1, April 2012.ISSN 2227-9903.
- ROJAS HUAYNATES, Joel (Editor), Segundo Montoya Huamaní (2013). En torno a Pedro S. Zulen: Selección de escritos y estudios complementarios. Lima: Fondo Editorial de la UNMSM.
- ROJAS HUAYNATES, Joel. La educación y el racialismo en el discurso crítico de Pedro Zulen durante el debate en el Centro Universitario a inicios del siglo XX. Solar: Revista de Filosofía Iberoamericana (Lima), N°7, pp. 33–48, 2011.
- ROJAS HUAYNATES, Joel. Dominación, racialismo y centralidad en torno a Pedro S. Zulen. In: ROJAS HUAYNATES, Joel (Editor). MONTOYA HUAMANÍ, Segundo. REYES ALVAREZ, Carlos, "En torno a Pedro S. Zulen: Selección de escritos y estudios complementarios", pp. 91–103, Fondo Editorial de la UNMSM, Lima, 2013.
