= United States national water polo team =

United States national water polo team may refer to:

- United States men's national water polo team
- United States women's national water polo team
- United States men's national junior water polo team
- United States women's national junior water polo team
- United States men's national youth water polo team
- United States women's national youth water polo team
- United States men's national cadet water polo team
- United States women's national cadet water polo team
