= 2024 World Aquatics Men's U16 Water Polo Championships =

International youth men's water polo tournament

Tournament details
- Host country: Malta
- Cities: Msida; Cospicua
- Venues: 2 (in 2 host cities)
- Dates: 18–24 June 2024
- Teams: 32 (from 5 confederations)

Final positions
- Champions: Spain (1st title)
- Runners-up: Italy
- Third place: Hungary
- Fourth place: Montenegro

Tournament statistics
- Matches played: 112

Official website
- www.worldaquatics.com

The 2024 World Aquatics Men's U16 Water Polo Championships was the second edition of the men's U16 Water Polo World Championship. The tournament was played in Msida and Cospicua, Malta, from 18 to 24 June 2024. Hungary were the defending champions. Spain won their first title after beating Italy in the final, 18–6.

== Hosts selection ==
On 7 December 2023, Malta was given the hosting rights.

== Participating teams ==
Africa

- Egypt
- South Africa
- Zimbabwe

Americas

- Brazil
- Canada
- Mexico
- Peru
- United States

Asia

- China
- Kazakhstan
- Singapore

Europe

- Bulgaria
- Croatia
- Czech Republic
- Georgia
- Germany
- Greece
- Hungary
- Israel
- Italy
- Malta (hosts)
- Montenegro
- Netherlands
- Poland
- Romania
- Serbia
- Slovenia
- Spain
- Turkey
- Ukraine

Oceania

- Australia
- New Zealand

== Format ==
The tournament consisted of two phases:

Group stage

The 32 teams were drawn into eight groups of four. Groups were played in a round-robin format, with all teams playing three matches. The top two teams from each group qualified for the Last 16. The bottom two teams from each group were dropped to the 17th–32nd place classification.

Knockout stage

All teams played four more matches in the knockout stage, which was played as a series of playoffs, consolation playoffs and final classification matches.

All times are local (Central European Summer Time; UTC+2).

== Group stage ==
=== Group A ===
Pos	Team	Pld	W	PSW	PSL	L	GF	GA	GD	Pts	Qualification
1	Serbia	3	3	0	0	0	59	13	+46	9	Last 16
2	Brazil	3	2	0	0	1	34	29	+5	6	Last 16
3	China	3	1	0	0	2	35	38	−3	3	17th–32nd place playoffs
4	Peru	3	0	0	0	3	11	59	−48	0	17th–32nd place playoffs

Source: World Aquatics

18 June 2024; 9:00	Report	Serbia	25–1	Peru	Cottonera Indoor Pool, Cospicua
18 June 2024; 9:00	Report	Score by quarters: 8–0, 4–0, 8–0, 5–1			Cottonera Indoor Pool, Cospicua

18 June 2024; 10:15	Report	China	11–12	Brazil	Cottonera Indoor Pool, Cospicua
18 June 2024; 10:15	Report	Score by quarters: 4–2, 2–4, 3–5, 2–1			Cottonera Indoor Pool, Cospicua

19 June 2024; 15:15	Report	Peru	7–17	China	Cottonera Indoor Pool, Cospicua
19 June 2024; 15:15	Report	Score by quarters: 2–3, 0–5, 2–4, 3–5			Cottonera Indoor Pool, Cospicua

19 June 2024; 16:30	Report	Brazil	5–15	Serbia	Cottonera Indoor Pool, Cospicua
19 June 2024; 16:30	Report	Score by quarters: 1–2, 1–1, 1–6, 2–6			Cottonera Indoor Pool, Cospicua

20 June 2024; 17:45	Report	Serbia	19–7	China	Cottonera Indoor Pool, Cospicua
20 June 2024; 17:45	Report	Score by quarters: 4–1, 4–1, 5–3, 6–2			Cottonera Indoor Pool, Cospicua

20 June 2024; 19:00	Report	Peru	3–17	Brazil	Cottonera Indoor Pool, Cospicua
20 June 2024; 19:00	Report	Score by quarters: 1–5, 0–4, 1–4, 1–4			Cottonera Indoor Pool, Cospicua

=== Group B ===
Pos	Team	Pld	W	PSW	PSL	L	GF	GA	GD	Pts	Qualification
1	Spain	3	3	0	0	0	55	13	+42	9	Last 16
2	Bulgaria	3	2	0	0	1	32	33	−1	6	Last 16
3	Czech Republic	3	1	0	0	2	24	27	−3	3	17th–32nd place playoffs
4	Zimbabwe	3	0	0	0	3	17	55	−38	0	17th–32nd place playoffs

Source: World Aquatics

18 June 2024; 11:30	Report	Spain	13–3	Czech Republic	Cottonera Indoor Pool, Cospicua
18 June 2024; 11:30	Report	Score by quarters: 3–0, 3–0, 3–1, 4–2			Cottonera Indoor Pool, Cospicua

18 June 2024; 12:45	Report	Bulgaria	14–11	Zimbabwe	Cottonera Indoor Pool, Cospicua
18 June 2024; 12:45	Report	Score by quarters: 4–2, 2–3, 5–2, 3–4			Cottonera Indoor Pool, Cospicua

19 June 2024; 17:45	Report	Czech Republic	7–12	Bulgaria	Cottonera Indoor Pool, Cospicua
19 June 2024; 17:45	Report	Score by quarters: 1–1, 1–4, 2–2, 3–5			Cottonera Indoor Pool, Cospicua

19 June 2024; 19:00	Report	Zimbabwe	4–27	Spain	Cottonera Indoor Pool, Cospicua
19 June 2024; 19:00	Report	Score by quarters: 1–4, 1–8, 2–8, 0–7			Cottonera Indoor Pool, Cospicua

20 June 2024; 15:15	Report	Spain	15–6	Bulgaria	Cottonera Indoor Pool, Cospicua
20 June 2024; 15:15	Report	Score by quarters: 4–0, 3–0, 4–2, 4–4			Cottonera Indoor Pool, Cospicua

20 June 2024; 16:30	Report	Czech Republic	14–2	Zimbabwe	Cottonera Indoor Pool, Cospicua
20 June 2024; 16:30	Report	Score by quarters: 3–1, 4–0, 5–0, 2–1			Cottonera Indoor Pool, Cospicua

=== Group C ===
Pos	Team	Pld	W	PSW	PSL	L	GF	GA	GD	Pts	Qualification
1	Hungary	3	3	0	0	0	47	16	+31	9	Last 16
2	Germany	3	2	0	0	1	32	25	+7	6	Last 16
3	Singapore	3	1	0	0	2	29	38	−9	3	17th–32nd place playoffs
4	Poland	3	0	0	0	3	16	45	−29	0	17th–32nd place playoffs

Source: World Aquatics

18 June 2024; 15:15	Report	Hungary	12–7	Germany	Cottonera Indoor Pool, Cospicua
18 June 2024; 15:15	Report	Score by quarters: 2–1, 4–1, 4–1, 2–4			Cottonera Indoor Pool, Cospicua

18 June 2024; 16:30	Report	Singapore	14–9	Poland	Cottonera Indoor Pool, Cospicua
18 June 2024; 16:30	Report	Score by quarters: 3–0, 3–3, 5–3, 3–3			Cottonera Indoor Pool, Cospicua

19 June 2024; 9:00	Report	Germany	12–9	Singapore	Cottonera Indoor Pool, Cospicua
19 June 2024; 9:00	Report	Score by quarters: 2–2, 4–3, 3–2, 3–2			Cottonera Indoor Pool, Cospicua

19 June 2024; 10:15	Report	Poland	3–18	Hungary	Cottonera Indoor Pool, Cospicua
19 June 2024; 10:15	Report	Score by quarters: 1–3, 1–6, 0–7, 1–2			Cottonera Indoor Pool, Cospicua

20 June 2024; 11:30	Report	Hungary	17–6	Singapore	Cottonera Indoor Pool, Cospicua
20 June 2024; 11:30	Report	Score by quarters: 5–2, 2–1, 4–1, 6–2			Cottonera Indoor Pool, Cospicua

20 June 2024; 12:45	Report	Germany	13–4	Poland	Cottonera Indoor Pool, Cospicua
20 June 2024; 12:45	Report	Score by quarters: 5–2, 2–0, 4–0, 2–2			Cottonera Indoor Pool, Cospicua

=== Group D ===
Pos	Team	Pld	W	PSW	PSL	L	GF	GA	GD	Pts	Qualification
1	United States	3	3	0	0	0	36	21	+15	9	Last 16
2	Netherlands	3	1	1	0	1	29	22	+7	5	Last 16
3	Israel	3	1	0	1	1	30	33	−3	4	17th–32nd place playoffs
4	New Zealand	3	0	0	0	3	18	37	−19	0	17th–32nd place playoffs

Source: World Aquatics

18 June 2024; 17:45	Report	United States	15–8	Israel	Cottonera Indoor Pool, Cospicua
18 June 2024; 17:45	Report	Score by quarters: 5–2, 3–3, 2–1, 5–2			Cottonera Indoor Pool, Cospicua

18 June 2024; 19:00	Report	New Zealand	4–12	Netherlands	Cottonera Indoor Pool, Cospicua
18 June 2024; 19:00	Report	Score by quarters: 0–3, 1–4, 1–1, 2–4			Cottonera Indoor Pool, Cospicua

19 June 2024; 11:30	Report	Israel	11–7	New Zealand	Cottonera Indoor Pool, Cospicua
19 June 2024; 11:30	Report	Score by quarters: 2–2, 4–2, 3–1, 2–2			Cottonera Indoor Pool, Cospicua

19 June 2024; 12:45	Report	Netherlands	6–7	United States	Cottonera Indoor Pool, Cospicua
19 June 2024; 12:45	Report	Score by quarters: 1–2, 3–1, 1–4, 1–0			Cottonera Indoor Pool, Cospicua

20 June 2024; 9:00	Report	United States	14–7	New Zealand	Cottonera Indoor Pool, Cospicua
20 June 2024; 9:00	Report	Score by quarters: 5–1, 4–1, 4–3, 1–2			Cottonera Indoor Pool, Cospicua

20 June 2024; 10:15	Report	Israel	11–11; PSO: 3–4	Netherlands	Cottonera Indoor Pool, Cospicua
20 June 2024; 10:15	Report	Score by quarters: 3–3, 3–2, 2–5, 3–1			Cottonera Indoor Pool, Cospicua

=== Group E ===
Pos	Team	Pld	W	PSW	PSL	L	GF	GA	GD	Pts	Qualification
1	Italy	3	3	0	0	0	60	15	+45	9	Last 16
2	Georgia	3	2	0	0	1	31	29	+2	6	Last 16
3	Ukraine	3	1	0	0	2	25	35	−10	3	17th–32nd place playoffs
4	Mexico	3	0	0	0	3	16	53	−37	0	17th–32nd place playoffs

Source: World Aquatics

18 June 2024; 9:00	Report	Italy	25–5	Mexico	Tal-Qroqq Sport Complex, Msida
18 June 2024; 9:00	Report	Score by quarters: 6–1, 7–2, 5–2, 7–0			Tal-Qroqq Sport Complex, Msida

18 June 2024; 10:15	Report	Georgia	10–8	Ukraine	Tal-Qroqq Sport Complex, Msida
18 June 2024; 10:15	Report	Score by quarters: 2–1, 3–1, 2–3, 3–3			Tal-Qroqq Sport Complex, Msida

19 June 2024; 12:45	Report	Mexico	4–14	Georgia	Tal-Qroqq Sport Complex, Msida
19 June 2024; 12:45	Report	Score by quarters: 2–3, 0–3, 2–3, 0–5			Tal-Qroqq Sport Complex, Msida

19 June 2024; 15:15	Report	Ukraine	3–18	Italy	Tal-Qroqq Sport Complex, Msida
19 June 2024; 15:15	Report	Score by quarters: 2–5, 0–5, 1–4, 0–4			Tal-Qroqq Sport Complex, Msida

20 June 2024; 16:30	Report	Italy	17–7	Georgia	Tal-Qroqq Sport Complex, Msida
20 June 2024; 16:30	Report	Score by quarters: 1–2, 4–3, 4–0, 8–2			Tal-Qroqq Sport Complex, Msida

20 June 2024; 17:45	Report	Mexico	7–14	Ukraine	Tal-Qroqq Sport Complex, Msida
20 June 2024; 17:45	Report	Score by quarters: 2–2, 1–5, 2–4, 2–3			Tal-Qroqq Sport Complex, Msida

=== Group F ===
Pos	Team	Pld	W	PSW	PSL	L	GF	GA	GD	Pts	Qualification
1	Montenegro	3	3	0	0	0	52	16	+36	9	Last 16
2	Egypt	3	1	1	0	1	28	32	−4	5	Last 16
3	South Africa	3	0	1	0	2	22	38	−16	2	17th–32nd place playoffs
4	Slovenia	3	0	0	2	1	30	46	−16	2	17th–32nd place playoffs

Source: World Aquatics

18 June 2024; 11:30	Report	Montenegro	18–6	South Africa	Tal-Qroqq Sport Complex, Msida
18 June 2024; 11:30	Report	Score by quarters: 5–1, 4–1, 5–3, 4–1			Tal-Qroqq Sport Complex, Msida

18 June 2024; 12:45	Report	Slovenia	14–14; PSO: 1–3	Egypt	Tal-Qroqq Sport Complex, Msida
18 June 2024; 12:45	Report	Score by quarters: 3–6, 4–3, 4–1, 3–4			Tal-Qroqq Sport Complex, Msida

19 June 2024; 16:30	Report	South Africa	10–10; PSO: 12–11	Slovenia	Tal-Qroqq Sport Complex, Msida
19 June 2024; 16:30	Report	Score by quarters: 3–1, 0–3, 4–3, 3–3			Tal-Qroqq Sport Complex, Msida

19 June 2024; 17:45	Report	Egypt	4–12	Montenegro	Tal-Qroqq Sport Complex, Msida
19 June 2024; 17:45	Report	Score by quarters: 1–3, 1–1, 1–4, 1–4			Tal-Qroqq Sport Complex, Msida

20 June 2024; 12:45	Report	Montenegro	22–6	Slovenia	Tal-Qroqq Sport Complex, Msida
20 June 2024; 12:45	Report	Score by quarters: 5–2, 6–0, 7–3, 4–1			Tal-Qroqq Sport Complex, Msida

20 June 2024; 15:15	Report	South Africa	6–10	Egypt	Tal-Qroqq Sport Complex, Msida
20 June 2024; 15:15	Report	Score by quarters: 1–3, 2–3, 1–2, 2–2			Tal-Qroqq Sport Complex, Msida

=== Group G ===
Pos	Team	Pld	W	PSW	PSL	L	GF	GA	GD	Pts	Qualification
1	Croatia	3	3	0	0	0	30	18	+12	9	Last 16
2	Australia	3	2	0	0	1	28	23	+5	6	Last 16
3	Turkey	3	1	0	0	2	22	25	−3	3	17th–32nd place playoffs
4	Canada	3	0	0	0	3	19	33	−14	0	17th–32nd place playoffs

Source: World Aquatics

18 June 2024; 15:15	Report	Croatia	10–4	Turkey	Tal-Qroqq Sport Complex, Msida
18 June 2024; 15:15	Report	Score by quarters: 3–0, 2–1, 3–2, 2–1			Tal-Qroqq Sport Complex, Msida

18 June 2024; 16:30	Report	Canada	6–12	Australia	Tal-Qroqq Sport Complex, Msida
18 June 2024; 16:30	Report	Score by quarters: 1–1, 1–4, 1–5, 3–2			Tal-Qroqq Sport Complex, Msida

19 June 2024; 9:00	Report	Turkey	12–7	Canada	Tal-Qroqq Sport Complex, Msida
19 June 2024; 9:00	Report	Score by quarters: 3–1, 3–3, 3–1, 3–2			Tal-Qroqq Sport Complex, Msida

19 June 2024; 10:15	Report	Australia	8–11	Croatia	Tal-Qroqq Sport Complex, Msida
19 June 2024; 10:15	Report	Score by quarters: 4–4, 2–3, 1–2, 1–2			Tal-Qroqq Sport Complex, Msida

20 June 2024; 10:15	Report	Croatia	9–6	Canada	Tal-Qroqq Sport Complex, Msida
20 June 2024; 10:15	Report	Score by quarters: 1–1, 1–2, 5–0, 2–3			Tal-Qroqq Sport Complex, Msida

20 June 2024; 11:30	Report	Turkey	6–8	Australia	Tal-Qroqq Sport Complex, Msida
20 June 2024; 11:30	Report	Score by quarters: 1–2, 2–1, 2–3, 1–2			Tal-Qroqq Sport Complex, Msida

=== Group H ===
Pos	Team	Pld	W	PSW	PSL	L	GF	GA	GD	Pts	Qualification
1	Greece	3	3	0	0	0	33	15	+18	9	Last 16
2	Romania	3	2	0	0	1	28	34	−6	6	Last 16
3	Malta (H)	3	1	0	0	2	31	26	+5	3	17th–32nd place playoffs
4	Kazakhstan	3	0	0	0	3	23	40	−17	0	17th–32nd place playoffs

Source: World Aquatics
(H) Host

18 June 2024; 17:45	Report	Romania	4–13	Greece	Tal-Qroqq Sport Complex, Msida
18 June 2024; 17:45	Report	Score by quarters: 1–5, 1–4, 1–2, 1–2			Tal-Qroqq Sport Complex, Msida

18 June 2024; 19:00	Report	Kazakhstan	6–16	Malta	Tal-Qroqq Sport Complex, Msida
18 June 2024; 19:00	Report	Score by quarters: 0–4, 2–3, 2–3, 2–6			Tal-Qroqq Sport Complex, Msida

19 June 2024; 11:30	Report	Greece	12–7	Kazakhstan	Tal-Qroqq Sport Complex, Msida
19 June 2024; 11:30	Report	Score by quarters: 3–4, 5–1, 4–0, 0–2			Tal-Qroqq Sport Complex, Msida

19 June 2024; 19:00	Report	Malta	11–12	Romania	Tal-Qroqq Sport Complex, Msida
19 June 2024; 19:00	Report	Score by quarters: 2–2, 0–4, 4–2, 5–4			Tal-Qroqq Sport Complex, Msida

20 June 2024; 9:00	Report	Kazakhstan	10–12	Romania	Tal-Qroqq Sport Complex, Msida
20 June 2024; 9:00	Report	Score by quarters: 5–3, 1–5, 1–3, 3–1			Tal-Qroqq Sport Complex, Msida

20 June 2024; 19:00	Report	Greece	8–4	Malta	Tal-Qroqq Sport Complex, Msida
20 June 2024; 19:00	Report	Score by quarters: 2–0, 2–1, 2–1, 2–2			Tal-Qroqq Sport Complex, Msida

== 17th–32nd place playoffs ==
=== Brackets ===
==== 17th place bracket ====
17th–32nd place crossovers
21 June
China	11
New Zealand	7
21 June
Zimbabwe	5
Singapore	17
21 June
Poland	15
Czech Republic	8
21 June
Peru	0
Israel	15
21 June
Ukraine	12
Kazakhstan	6
21 June
Slovenia	6
Turkey	16
21 June
South Africa	15
Canada	11
21 June
Mexico	8
Malta	22

17th–24th place quarterfinals
22 June
China	14 (5)
Singapore (PSO)	14 (6)
22 June
Poland	6
Israel	13
22 June
Ukraine	11
Turkey	15
22 June
South Africa	9
Malta	16

17th–20th place semifinals
23 June
Singapore	8
Israel	12
23 June
Turkey	4
Malta	8

17th place match
24 June
Israel	8
Malta	11
19th place match
24 June
Singapore	9
Turkey	13

==== 21st place bracket ====
21st–24th place semifinals
23 June
China	11
Poland	12
23 June
Ukraine	14
South Africa	9

21st place match
24 June
Poland	12
Ukraine	9
23rd place match
24 June
China	11
South Africa	6

==== 25th place bracket ====
25th–32nd place quarterfinals
22 June
New Zealand	16
Zimbabwe	5
22 June
Czech Republic	4
Peru	8
22 June
Kazakhstan	16
Slovenia	7
22 June
Canada	25
Mexico	9

25th–28th place semifinals
23 June
New Zealand	8
Peru	4
23 June
Kazakhstan	8
Canada	14

25th place match
24 June
New Zealand	8
Canada	7
27th place match
24 June
Peru	5
Kazakhstan	14

==== 29th place bracket ====
29th–32nd place semifinals
23 June
Zimbabwe	9
Czech Republic	12
23 June
Slovenia	14
Mexico	12

29th place match
24 June
Czech Republic	8
Slovenia	10
31st place match
24 June
Zimbabwe	7
Mexico	11

=== 17th–32nd place crossovers ===
21 June 2024; 9:00	Report	China	11–7	New Zealand	Cottonera Indoor Pool, Cospicua
21 June 2024; 9:00	Report	Score by quarters: 1–3, 3–1, 5–2, 2–1			Cottonera Indoor Pool, Cospicua

21 June 2024; 10:15	Report	Zimbabwe	5–17	Singapore	Cottonera Indoor Pool, Cospicua
21 June 2024; 10:15	Report	Score by quarters: 1–5, 3–5, 0–5, 1–2			Cottonera Indoor Pool, Cospicua

21 June 2024; 11:30	Report	Poland	15–8	Czech Republic	Cottonera Indoor Pool, Cospicua
21 June 2024; 11:30	Report	Score by quarters: 4–2, 4–1, 4–2, 3–3			Cottonera Indoor Pool, Cospicua

21 June 2024; 12:45	Report	Peru	0–15	Israel	Cottonera Indoor Pool, Cospicua
21 June 2024; 12:45	Report	Score by quarters: 0–3, 0–4, 0–3, 0–5			Cottonera Indoor Pool, Cospicua

21 June 2024; 15:15	Report	Ukraine	12–6	Kazakhstan	Cottonera Indoor Pool, Cospicua
21 June 2024; 15:15	Report	Score by quarters: 3–2, 2–3, 2–0, 5–1			Cottonera Indoor Pool, Cospicua

21 June 2024; 16:30	Report	Slovenia	6–16	Turkey	Cottonera Indoor Pool, Cospicua
21 June 2024; 16:30	Report	Score by quarters: 2–6, 4–1, 0–5, 0–4			Cottonera Indoor Pool, Cospicua

21 June 2024; 17:45	Report	South Africa	15–11	Canada	Cottonera Indoor Pool, Cospicua
21 June 2024; 17:45	Report	Score by quarters: 2–1, 3–4, 5–2, 5–4			Cottonera Indoor Pool, Cospicua

21 June 2024; 19:00	Report	Mexico	8–22	Malta	Cottonera Indoor Pool, Cospicua
21 June 2024; 19:00	Report	Score by quarters: 3–5, 2–7, 1–4, 2–6			Cottonera Indoor Pool, Cospicua

=== 25th–32nd place quarterfinals ===
22 June 2024; 9:00	Report	New Zealand	16–5	Zimbabwe	Cottonera Indoor Pool, Cospicua
22 June 2024; 9:00	Report	Score by quarters: 4–0, 5–5, 3–0, 4–0			Cottonera Indoor Pool, Cospicua

22 June 2024; 10:15	Report	Czech Republic	4–8	Peru	Cottonera Indoor Pool, Cospicua
22 June 2024; 10:15	Report	Score by quarters: 0–3, 1–2, 2–2, 1–1			Cottonera Indoor Pool, Cospicua

22 June 2024; 11:30	Report	Kazakhstan	16–7	Slovenia	Cottonera Indoor Pool, Cospicua
22 June 2024; 11:30	Report	Score by quarters: 4–1, 2–1, 4–2, 6–3			Cottonera Indoor Pool, Cospicua

22 June 2024; 12:45	Report	Canada	25–9	Mexico	Cottonera Indoor Pool, Cospicua
22 June 2024; 12:45	Report	Score by quarters: 6–2, 5–2, 7–0, 7–5			Cottonera Indoor Pool, Cospicua

=== 29th–32nd place semifinals ===
23 June 2024; 9:00	Report	Zimbabwe	9–12	Czech Republic	Cottonera Indoor Pool, Cospicua
23 June 2024; 9:00	Report	Score by quarters: 3–3, 2–3, 3–3, 1–3			Cottonera Indoor Pool, Cospicua

23 June 2024; 10:15	Report	Slovenia	14–12	Mexico	Cottonera Indoor Pool, Cospicua
23 June 2024; 10:15	Report	Score by quarters: 3–3, 3–4, 4–3, 4–2			Cottonera Indoor Pool, Cospicua

==== 31st place match ====
24 June 2024; 8:00	Report	Zimbabwe	7–11	Mexico	Cottonera Indoor Pool, Cospicua
24 June 2024; 8:00	Report	Score by quarters: 1–2, 1–3, 4–3, 1–3			Cottonera Indoor Pool, Cospicua

==== 29th place match ====
24 June 2024; 9:15	Report	Czech Republic	8–10	Slovenia	Cottonera Indoor Pool, Cospicua
24 June 2024; 9:15	Report	Score by quarters: 1–2, 4–3, 1–2, 2–3			Cottonera Indoor Pool, Cospicua

=== 25th–28th place semifinals ===
23 June 2024; 11:30	Report	New Zealand	8–4	Peru	Cottonera Indoor Pool, Cospicua
23 June 2024; 11:30	Report	Score by quarters: 1–1, 4–2, 0–1, 3–0			Cottonera Indoor Pool, Cospicua

23 June 2024; 12:45	Report	Kazakhstan	8–14	Canada	Cottonera Indoor Pool, Cospicua
23 June 2024; 12:45	Report	Score by quarters: 1–5, 3–5, 1–2, 3–2			Cottonera Indoor Pool, Cospicua

==== 27th place match ====
24 June 2024; 10:30	Report	Peru	5–14	Kazakhstan	Cottonera Indoor Pool, Cospicua
24 June 2024; 10:30	Report	Score by quarters: 0–4, 0–4, 2–2, 3–4			Cottonera Indoor Pool, Cospicua

==== 25th place match ====
24 June 2024; 11:45	Report	New Zealand	8–7	Canada	Cottonera Indoor Pool, Cospicua
24 June 2024; 11:45	Report	Score by quarters: 0–1, 1–2, 4–2, 3–2			Cottonera Indoor Pool, Cospicua

=== 17th–24th place quarterfinals ===
22 June 2024; 15:15	Report	China	14–14; PSO: 5–6	Singapore	Cottonera Indoor Pool, Cospicua
22 June 2024; 15:15	Report	Score by quarters: 2–4, 3–3, 6–4, 3–3			Cottonera Indoor Pool, Cospicua

22 June 2024; 16:30	Report	Poland	6–13	Israel	Cottonera Indoor Pool, Cospicua
22 June 2024; 16:30	Report	Score by quarters: 0–3, 2–3, 3–6, 1–1			Cottonera Indoor Pool, Cospicua

22 June 2024; 17:45	Report	Ukraine	11–15	Turkey	Cottonera Indoor Pool, Cospicua
22 June 2024; 17:45	Report	Score by quarters: 2–3, 3–4, 3–3, 3–5			Cottonera Indoor Pool, Cospicua

22 June 2024; 19:00	Report	South Africa	9–16	Malta	Cottonera Indoor Pool, Cospicua
22 June 2024; 19:00	Report	Score by quarters: 4–4, 1–4, 3–3, 1–5			Cottonera Indoor Pool, Cospicua

=== 21st–24th place semifinals ===
23 June 2024; 15:15	Report	China	11–12	Poland	Cottonera Indoor Pool, Cospicua
23 June 2024; 15:15	Report	Score by quarters: 4–2, 3–3, 2–1, 2–6			Cottonera Indoor Pool, Cospicua

23 June 2024; 16:30	Report	Ukraine	14–9	South Africa	Cottonera Indoor Pool, Cospicua
23 June 2024; 16:30	Report	Score by quarters: 1–3, 4–3, 4–2, 5–1			Cottonera Indoor Pool, Cospicua

==== 23rd place match ====
24 June 2024; 13:00	Report	China	11–6	South Africa	Cottonera Indoor Pool, Cospicua
24 June 2024; 13:00	Report	Score by quarters: 3–1, 5–0, 2–2, 1–3			Cottonera Indoor Pool, Cospicua

==== 21st place match ====
24 June 2024; 14:15	Report	Poland	12–9	Ukraine	Cottonera Indoor Pool, Cospicua
24 June 2024; 14:15	Report	Score by quarters: 2–1, 4–4, 2–2, 4–2			Cottonera Indoor Pool, Cospicua

=== 17th–20th place semifinals ===
23 June 2024; 17:45	Report	Singapore	8–12	Israel	Cottonera Indoor Pool, Cospicua
23 June 2024; 17:45	Report	Score by quarters: 2–4, 2–0, 2–3, 2–5			Cottonera Indoor Pool, Cospicua

23 June 2024; 19:00	Report	Turkey	4–8	Malta	Cottonera Indoor Pool, Cospicua
23 June 2024; 19:00	Report	Score by quarters: 1–2, 1–3, 0–2, 2–1			Cottonera Indoor Pool, Cospicua

==== 19th place match ====
24 June 2024; 15:30	Report	Singapore	9–13	Turkey	Cottonera Indoor Pool, Cospicua
24 June 2024; 15:30	Report	Score by quarters: 0–7, 4–3, 2–2, 3–1			Cottonera Indoor Pool, Cospicua

==== 17th place match ====
24 June 2024; 16:45	Report	Israel	8–11	Malta	Cottonera Indoor Pool, Cospicua
24 June 2024; 16:45	Report	Score by quarters: 4–2, 2–2, 2–4, 0–3			Cottonera Indoor Pool, Cospicua

== Championship playoffs ==
=== Brackets ===
==== Main bracket ====
Crossovers
21 June
Serbia	10
Netherlands	4
21 June
Bulgaria	5
Hungary	15
21 June
Germany	9
Spain	11
21 June
Brazil	6
United States	11
21 June
Italy	10
Romania	8
21 June
Egypt	4
Croatia	19
21 June
Montenegro	8
Australia	5
21 June
Georgia	7
Greece	17

Quarterfinals
22 June
Serbia	7
Hungary	12
22 June
Spain	14
United States	9
22 June
Italy	12
Croatia	9
22 June
Montenegro (PSO)	11 (4)
Greece	11 (3)

Semifinals
23 June
Hungary	6
Spain	14
23 June
Italy (PSO)	8 (6)
Montenegro	8 (5)

Final
24 June
Spain	18
Italy	6
3rd place match
24 June
Hungary	12
Montenegro	10

==== 5th place bracket ====
5th–8th place semifinals
23 June
Serbia	9
United States	12
23 June
Croatia	15
Greece	17

5th place match
24 June
United States (PSO)	11 (6)
Greece	11 (5)
7th place match
24 June
Serbia	10
Croatia	11

==== 9th place bracket ====
9th–16th place quarterfinals
22 June
Netherlands	6
Bulgaria	4
22 June
Germany	10
Brazil	4
24 June
Romania	10 (1)
Egypt (PSO)	10 (3)
22 June
Australia	12
Georgia	3

9th–12th place semifinals
23 June
Netherlands	8
Germany	7
23 June
Egypt	10
Australia	13

9th place match
24 June
Netherlands	12
Australia	8
11th place match
24 June
Germany	8 (4)
Egypt (PSO)	8 (5)

==== 13th place bracket ====
13th–16th place semifinals
23 June
Bulgaria	9
Brazil	10
23 June
Romania	9
Georgia	2

13th place match
24 June
Brazil	5
Romania	12
15th place match
24 June
Bulgaria	12
Georgia	9

=== Crossovers ===
21 June 2024; 9:00	Report	Serbia	10–4	Netherlands	Tal-Qroqq Sport Complex, Msida
21 June 2024; 9:00	Report	Score by quarters: 5–1, 2–1, 1–1, 2–1			Tal-Qroqq Sport Complex, Msida

21 June 2024; 10:15	Report	Bulgaria	5–15	Hungary	Tal-Qroqq Sport Complex, Msida
21 June 2024; 10:15	Report	Score by quarters: 2–4, 3–1, 0–5, 0–5			Tal-Qroqq Sport Complex, Msida

21 June 2024; 11:30	Report	Germany	9–11	Spain	Tal-Qroqq Sport Complex, Msida
21 June 2024; 11:30	Report	Score by quarters: 3–3, 2–1, 0–4, 4–3			Tal-Qroqq Sport Complex, Msida

21 June 2024; 12:45	Report	Brazil	6–11	United States	Tal-Qroqq Sport Complex, Msida
21 June 2024; 12:45	Report	Score by quarters: 2–4, 2–1, 1–4, 1–2			Tal-Qroqq Sport Complex, Msida

21 June 2024; 15:15	Report	Italy	10–8	Romania	Tal-Qroqq Sport Complex, Msida
21 June 2024; 15:15	Report	Score by quarters: 1–2, 3–2, 3–2, 3–2			Tal-Qroqq Sport Complex, Msida

21 June 2024; 16:30	Report	Egypt	4–19	Croatia	Tal-Qroqq Sport Complex, Msida
21 June 2024; 16:30	Report	Score by quarters: 2–4, 1–3, 1–6, 0–6			Tal-Qroqq Sport Complex, Msida

21 June 2024; 17:45	Report	Montenegro	8–5	Australia	Tal-Qroqq Sport Complex, Msida
21 June 2024; 17:45	Report	Score by quarters: 3–0, 2–3, 1–0, 2–2			Tal-Qroqq Sport Complex, Msida

21 June 2024; 19:00	Report	Georgia	7–17	Greece	Tal-Qroqq Sport Complex, Msida
21 June 2024; 19:00	Report	Score by quarters: 3–4, 1–5, 0–4, 3–4			Tal-Qroqq Sport Complex, Msida

=== 9th–16th place quarterfinals ===
22 June 2024; 9:00	Report	Netherlands	6–4	Bulgaria	Tal-Qroqq Sport Complex, Msida
22 June 2024; 9:00	Report	Score by quarters: 0–0, 2–2, 1–1, 3–1			Tal-Qroqq Sport Complex, Msida

22 June 2024; 10:15	Report	Germany	10–4	Brazil	Tal-Qroqq Sport Complex, Msida
22 June 2024; 10:15	Report	Score by quarters: 2–1, 3–1, 2–2, 3–0			Tal-Qroqq Sport Complex, Msida

22 June 2024; 11:30	Report	Romania	10–10; PSO: 1–3	Egypt	Tal-Qroqq Sport Complex, Msida
22 June 2024; 11:30	Report	Score by quarters: 3–2, 1–2, 3–4, 3–2			Tal-Qroqq Sport Complex, Msida

22 June 2024; 12:45	Report	Australia	12–3	Georgia	Tal-Qroqq Sport Complex, Msida
22 June 2024; 12:45	Report	Score by quarters: 4–0, 2–0, 2–1, 4–2			Tal-Qroqq Sport Complex, Msida

=== 13th–16th place semifinals ===
23 June 2024; 9:00	Report	Bulgaria	9–10	Brazil	Tal-Qroqq Sport Complex, Msida
23 June 2024; 9:00	Report	Score by quarters: 1–1, 2–3, 5–3, 1–3			Tal-Qroqq Sport Complex, Msida

23 June 2024; 10:15	Report	Romania	9–2	Georgia	Tal-Qroqq Sport Complex, Msida
23 June 2024; 10:15	Report	Score by quarters: 1–1, 3–0, 1–1, 4–0			Tal-Qroqq Sport Complex, Msida

==== 15th place match ====
24 June 2024; 9:00	Report	Bulgaria	12–9	Georgia	Tal-Qroqq Sport Complex, Msida
24 June 2024; 9:00	Report	Score by quarters: 2–3, 6–1, 2–2, 2–3			Tal-Qroqq Sport Complex, Msida

==== 13th place match ====
24 June 2024; 10:15	Report	Brazil	5–12	Romania	Tal-Qroqq Sport Complex, Msida
24 June 2024; 10:15	Report	Score by quarters: 1–2, 2–4, 2–2, 0–4			Tal-Qroqq Sport Complex, Msida

=== 9th–12th place semifinals ===
23 June 2024; 11:30	Report	Netherlands	8–7	Germany	Tal-Qroqq Sport Complex, Msida
23 June 2024; 11:30	Report	Score by quarters: 3–1, 2–1, 2–2, 1–3			Tal-Qroqq Sport Complex, Msida

23 June 2024; 12:45	Report	Egypt	10–13	Australia	Tal-Qroqq Sport Complex, Msida
23 June 2024; 12:45	Report	Score by quarters: 5–2, 2–2, 1–5, 2–4			Tal-Qroqq Sport Complex, Msida

==== 11th place match ====
24 June 2024; 11:30	Report	Germany	8–8; PSO: 4–5	Egypt	Tal-Qroqq Sport Complex, Msida
24 June 2024; 11:30	Report	Score by quarters: 2–1, 2–2, 2–3, 2–2			Tal-Qroqq Sport Complex, Msida

==== 9th place match ====
24 June 2024; 12:45	Report	Netherlands	12–8	Australia	Tal-Qroqq Sport Complex, Msida
24 June 2024; 12:45	Report	Score by quarters: 4–1, 1–1, 3–1, 4–5			Tal-Qroqq Sport Complex, Msida

=== Quarterfinals ===
22 June 2024; 15:00	Report	Serbia	7–12	Hungary	Tal-Qroqq Sport Complex, Msida
22 June 2024; 15:00	Report	Score by quarters: 4–3, 1–2, 1–4, 1–3			Tal-Qroqq Sport Complex, Msida

22 June 2024; 16:30	Report	Spain	14–9	United States	Tal-Qroqq Sport Complex, Msida
22 June 2024; 16:30	Report	Score by quarters: 5–2, 3–3, 2–2, 4–2			Tal-Qroqq Sport Complex, Msida

22 June 2024; 18:00	Report	Italy	12–9	Croatia	Tal-Qroqq Sport Complex, Msida
22 June 2024; 18:00	Report	Score by quarters: 3–2, 4–3, 4–2, 1–2			Tal-Qroqq Sport Complex, Msida

22 June 2024; 19:30	Report	Montenegro	11–11; PSO: 4–3	Greece	Tal-Qroqq Sport Complex, Msida
22 June 2024; 19:30	Report	Score by quarters: 2–4, 3–3, 1–4, 5–0			Tal-Qroqq Sport Complex, Msida

=== 5th–8th place semifinals ===
23 June 2024; 15:00	Report	Serbia	9–12	United States	Tal-Qroqq Sport Complex, Msida
23 June 2024; 15:00	Report	Score by quarters: 2–5, 2–3, 1–1, 4–3			Tal-Qroqq Sport Complex, Msida

23 June 2024; 16:30	Report	Croatia	15–17	Greece	Tal-Qroqq Sport Complex, Msida
23 June 2024; 16:30	Report	Score by quarters: 2–2, 4–5, 6–6, 3–4			Tal-Qroqq Sport Complex, Msida

==== 7th place match ====
24 June 2024; 15:00	Report	Serbia	10–11	Croatia	Tal-Qroqq Sport Complex, Msida
24 June 2024; 15:00	Report	Score by quarters: 4–3, 2–1, 2–2, 2–5			Tal-Qroqq Sport Complex, Msida

==== 5th place match ====
24 June 2024; 16:30	Report	United States	11–11; PSO: 6–5	Greece	Tal-Qroqq Sport Complex, Msida
24 June 2024; 16:30	Report	Score by quarters: 3–3, 4–4, 3–3, 1–1			Tal-Qroqq Sport Complex, Msida

=== Semifinals ===
23 June 2024; 18:00	Report	Hungary	6–14	Spain	Tal-Qroqq Sport Complex, Msida
23 June 2024; 18:00	Report	Score by quarters: 1–3, 0–3, 2–4, 3–4			Tal-Qroqq Sport Complex, Msida

23 June 2024; 19:30	Report	Italy	8–8; PSO: 6–5	Montenegro	Tal-Qroqq Sport Complex, Msida
23 June 2024; 19:30	Report	Score by quarters: 2–3, 3–3, 0–1, 3–1			Tal-Qroqq Sport Complex, Msida

==== 3rd place match ====
24 June 2024; 18:00	Report	Hungary	12–10	Montenegro	Tal-Qroqq Sport Complex, Msida
24 June 2024; 18:00	Report	Score by quarters: 2–2, 4–3, 3–3, 3–2			Tal-Qroqq Sport Complex, Msida

==== Final ====
24 June 2024; 19:30	Report	Spain	18–6	Italy	Tal-Qroqq Sport Complex, Msida
24 June 2024; 19:30	Report	Score by quarters: 4–0, 4–3, 6–1, 4–2			Tal-Qroqq Sport Complex, Msida

== Final standings ==
Rank	Team
1st place, gold medalist(s)	Spain
2nd place, silver medalist(s)	Italy
3rd place, bronze medalist(s)	Hungary
4	Montenegro
5	United States
6	Greece
7	Croatia
8	Serbia
9	Netherlands
10	Australia
11	Egypt
12	Germany
13	Romania
14	Brazil
15	Bulgaria
16	Georgia

Rank	Team
17	Malta
18	Israel
19	Turkey
20	Singapore
21	Poland
22	Ukraine
23	China
24	South Africa
25	New Zealand
26	Canada
27	Kazakhstan
28	Peru
29	Slovenia
30	Czech Republic
31	Mexico
32	Zimbabwe
