= 2025 Pan American Aquatics U15 Water Polo Championships – Men's tournament =

2025 PanAm Aquatics U15 Men's Water Polo Championship

Tournament details
- Host country: Brazil
- City: Bauru
- Venue: 1 (in 1 host city)
- Dates: 1–7 September
- Teams: 9 (from 1 confederation)

Final positions
- Champions: Brazil (1st title)
- Runners-up: United States
- Third place: Canada
- Fourth place: Argentina

The 2025 PanAm Aquatics U15 Water Polo Championships – Men's tournament was the second edition of the Pan American under-15 men's water polo championship, organized by the PanAm Aquatics. The event was held in Bauru, Brazil, from 1 to 7 September 2025.

Players born in 2010 or later were eligible to participate.

== Format ==
Nine teams entered the championship. They were divided into two tiered groups of four and five (the Gold Group and the Silver Group) according to their position in the World Aquatics boys' ranking. Groups were played in a round-robin format. All teams advanced to the playoffs with consolations, with the bottom two teams from the Silver Group playing the crossover first.

== Group stage ==
All times are local (Brasília time; UTC-3).

=== Gold Group ===
| Pos | Team | Pld | W | PSW | PSL | L | GF | GA | GD | Pts | Qualification |
|---|---|---|---|---|---|---|---|---|---|---|---|
| 1 | Brazil | 3 | 3 | 0 | 0 | 0 | 43 | 14 | +29 | 9 | Quarterfinals |
| 2 | United States | 3 | 2 | 0 | 0 | 1 | 34 | 25 | +9 | 6 | Quarterfinals |
| 3 | Canada | 3 | 1 | 0 | 0 | 2 | 24 | 40 | −16 | 3 | Quarterfinals |
| 4 | Argentina | 3 | 0 | 0 | 0 | 3 | 22 | 44 | −22 | 0 | Quarterfinals |

Source: bauru2025.panamaquaticsevents.com

| 1 September 2025; 17:40 | Report | Argentina | 9–10 | Canada | ABDA Arena (Indoor pool), Bauru |
| 1 September 2025; 17:40 | Report | Score by quarters: 2–1, 2–2, 2–2, 3–5 | | | ABDA Arena (Indoor pool), Bauru |

| 1 September 2025; 19:30 | Report | Brazil | 8–4 | United States | ABDA Arena (Indoor pool), Bauru |
| 1 September 2025; 19:30 | Report | Score by quarters: 2–0, 0–2, 4–2, 2–0 | | | ABDA Arena (Indoor pool), Bauru |

| 2 September 2025; 10:40 | Report | United States | 15–8 | Argentina | ABDA Arena (Indoor pool), Bauru |
| 2 September 2025; 10:40 | Report | Score by quarters: 0–1, 5–2, 6–2, 4–3 | | | ABDA Arena (Indoor pool), Bauru |

| 2 September 2025; 12:00 | Report | Canada | 5–16 | Brazil | ABDA Arena (Indoor pool), Bauru |
| 2 September 2025; 12:00 | Report | Score by quarters: 2–4, 0–3, 3–4, 0–5 | | | ABDA Arena (Indoor pool), Bauru |

| 3 September 2025; 10:40 | Report | United States | 15–9 | Canada | ABDA Arena (Indoor pool), Bauru |
| 3 September 2025; 10:40 | Report | Score by quarters: 3–4, 5–1, 2–2, 5–2 | | | ABDA Arena (Indoor pool), Bauru |

| 3 September 2025; 12:00 | Report | Brazil | 19–5 | Argentina | ABDA Arena (Indoor pool), Bauru |
| 3 September 2025; 12:00 | Report | Score by quarters: 5–0, 5–1, 5–3, 4–1 | | | ABDA Arena (Indoor pool), Bauru |

=== Silver Group ===
| Pos | Team | Pld | W | PSW | PSL | L | GF | GA | GD | Pts | Qualification |
|---|---|---|---|---|---|---|---|---|---|---|---|
| 1 | Mexico | 4 | 4 | 0 | 0 | 0 | 64 | 32 | +32 | 12 | Quarterfinals |
| 2 | Peru | 4 | 3 | 0 | 0 | 1 | 62 | 30 | +32 | 9 | Quarterfinals |
| 3 | Puerto Rico | 4 | 2 | 0 | 0 | 2 | 45 | 33 | +12 | 6 | Quarterfinals |
| 4 | Uruguay | 4 | 1 | 0 | 0 | 3 | 29 | 49 | −20 | 3 | Crossover |
| 5 | Chile | 4 | 0 | 0 | 0 | 4 | 26 | 82 | −56 | 0 | Crossover |

Source: bauru2025.panamaquaticsevents.com

| 1 September 2025; 15:00 | Report | Mexico | 25–10 | Chile | ABDA Arena (Indoor pool), Bauru |
| 1 September 2025; 15:00 | Report | Score by quarters: 7–2, 7–2, 7–3, 4–3 | | | ABDA Arena (Indoor pool), Bauru |

| 1 September 2025; 16:20 | Report | Puerto Rico | 9–12 | Peru | ABDA Arena (Indoor pool), Bauru |
| 1 September 2025; 16:20 | Report | Score by quarters: 2–3, 1–2, 5–7, 1–0 | | | ABDA Arena (Indoor pool), Bauru |

| 2 September 2025; 8:00 | Report | Uruguay | 7–9 | Puerto Rico | ABDA Arena (Indoor pool), Bauru |
| 2 September 2025; 8:00 | Report | Score by quarters: 1–3, 2–1, 2–3, 2–2 | | | ABDA Arena (Indoor pool), Bauru |

| 2 September 2025; 9:20 | Report | Chile | 4–26 | Peru | ABDA Arena (Indoor pool), Bauru |
| 2 September 2025; 9:20 | Report | Score by quarters: 1–6, 1–6, 1–6, 1–8 | | | ABDA Arena (Indoor pool), Bauru |

| 2 September 2025; 18:40 | Report | Peru | 8–13 | Mexico | ABDA Arena (Indoor pool), Bauru |
| 2 September 2025; 18:40 | Report | Score by quarters: 2–3, 3–3, 3–6, 0–1 | | | ABDA Arena (Indoor pool), Bauru |

| 2 September 2025; 20:00 | Report | Uruguay | 12–10 | Chile | ABDA Arena (Indoor pool), Bauru |
| 2 September 2025; 20:00 | Report | Score by quarters: 5–3, 2–2, 3–3, 2–2 | | | ABDA Arena (Indoor pool), Bauru |

| 3 September 2025; 8:00 | Report | Puerto Rico | 8–12 | Mexico | ABDA Arena (Indoor pool), Bauru |
| 3 September 2025; 8:00 | Report | Score by quarters: 1–1, 3–3, 2–4, 2–4 | | | ABDA Arena (Indoor pool), Bauru |

| 3 September 2025; 9:20 | Report | Peru | 16–4 | Uruguay | ABDA Arena (Indoor pool), Bauru |
| 3 September 2025; 9:20 | Report | Score by quarters: 3–1, 4–0, 3–3, 6–0 | | | ABDA Arena (Indoor pool), Bauru |

| 3 September 2025; 18:40 | Report | Mexico | 14–6 | Uruguay | ABDA Arena (Indoor pool), Bauru |
| 3 September 2025; 18:40 | Report | Score by quarters: 2–1, 3–0, 3–3, 6–2 | | | ABDA Arena (Indoor pool), Bauru |

| 3 September 2025; 20:00 | Report | Chile | 2–19 | Puerto Rico | ABDA Arena (Indoor pool), Bauru |
| 3 September 2025; 20:00 | Report | Score by quarters: 1–5, 1–4, 0–4, 0–6 | | | ABDA Arena (Indoor pool), Bauru |

== Playoffs ==
=== Brackets ===
==== Main bracket ====
Crossover
4 September
S4 Uruguay | 13
S5 Chile | 6

Quarterfinals
5 September
G1 Brazil | 23
S4 Uruguay | 3
5 September
G4 Argentina | 10
S1 Mexico | 8
5 September
G2 United States | 21
S3 Puerto Rico | 5
5 September
G3 Canada | 9
S2 Peru | 8

Semifinals
6 September
Brazil | 19
Argentina | 12
6 September
United States | 22
Canada | 17

Final
7 September
Brazil | 15
United States | 8
3rd place match
7 September
Argentina | 7
Canada | 9

==== 5th place bracket ====
9th place
Chile

5th–9th place quarterfinal
6 September
Chile | 3
Mexico | 22

5th–8th place semifinals
6 September
Uruguay
Mexico | DFLT
6 September
Puerto Rico | 7(4)
Peru | 7(3)

5th place match
7 September
Mexico | 16(3)
Puerto Rico | 16(4)
7th place match
7 September
Uruguay | 9
Peru | 13

=== Crossover ===
| 4 September 2025; 9:00 | Report | Uruguay | 13–6 | Chile | ABDA Arena (Indoor pool), Bauru |
| 4 September 2025; 9:00 | Report | Score by quarters: 2–0, 5–0, 2–1, 4–5 | | | ABDA Arena (Indoor pool), Bauru |

=== Championship quarterfinals ===
| 5 September 2025; 15:00 | Report | Brazil | 23–3 | Uruguay | ABDA Arena (Indoor pool), Bauru |
| 5 September 2025; 15:00 | Report | Score by quarters: 7–0, 4–0, 8–0, 4–3 | | | ABDA Arena (Indoor pool), Bauru |

| 5 September 2025; 16:20 | Report | United States | 21–5 | Puerto Rico | ABDA Arena (Indoor pool), Bauru |
| 5 September 2025; 16:20 | Report | Score by quarters: 8–1, 5–0, 6–2, 2–2 | | | ABDA Arena (Indoor pool), Bauru |

| 5 September 2025; 17:40 | Report | Canada | 9–8 | Peru | ABDA Arena (Indoor pool), Bauru |
| 5 September 2025; 17:40 | Report | Score by quarters: 2–0, 4–3, 2–3, 1–2 | | | ABDA Arena (Indoor pool), Bauru |

| 5 September 2025; 19:00 | Report | Argentina | 10–8 | Mexico | ABDA Arena (Indoor pool), Bauru |
| 5 September 2025; 19:00 | Report | Score by quarters: 4–3, 2–1, 2–2, 2–2 | | | ABDA Arena (Indoor pool), Bauru |

=== 5th–9th place quarterfinal ===
| 6 September 2025; 15:00 | Report | Chile | 3–22 | Mexico | ABDA Arena (Indoor pool), Bauru |
| 6 September 2025; 15:00 | Report | Score by quarters: 1–9, 1–2, 1–6, 0–5 | | | ABDA Arena (Indoor pool), Bauru |

=== 5th–8th place semifinal ===
| 6 September 2025; 16:30 | Report | Puerto Rico | 7–7; PSO: 4–3 | Peru | ABDA Arena (Indoor pool), Bauru |
| 6 September 2025; 16:30 | Report | Score by quarters: 2–2, 0–3, 3–2, 2–0 | | | ABDA Arena (Indoor pool), Bauru |

==== 7th place match ====
| 7 September 2025; 8:00 | Report | Uruguay | 9–13 | Peru | ABDA Arena (Indoor pool), Bauru |
| 7 September 2025; 8:00 | Report | Score by quarters: 0–6, 3–2, 5–1, 1–4 | | | ABDA Arena (Indoor pool), Bauru |

==== 5th place match ====
| 7 September 2025; 13:30 | Report | Mexico | 16–16; PSO: 3–4 | Puerto Rico | ABDA Arena (Indoor pool), Bauru |
| 7 September 2025; 13:30 | Report | Score by quarters: 4–2, 6–3, 2–7, 4–4 | | | ABDA Arena (Indoor pool), Bauru |

=== Championship semifinals ===
| 6 September 2025; 18:00 | Report | Brazil | 19–12 | Argentina | ABDA Arena (Indoor pool), Bauru |
| 6 September 2025; 18:00 | Report | Score by quarters: 6–4, 4–2, 3–2, 6–4 | | | ABDA Arena (Indoor pool), Bauru |

| 6 September 2025; 19:30 | Report | United States | 22–17 | Canada | ABDA Arena (Indoor pool), Bauru |
| 6 September 2025; 19:30 | Report | Score by quarters: 6–5, 6–2, 4–3, 6–7 | | | ABDA Arena (Indoor pool), Bauru |

==== 3rd place match ====
| 7 September 2025; 16:30 | Report | Argentina | 7–9 | Canada | ABDA Arena (Indoor pool), Bauru |
| 7 September 2025; 16:30 | Report | Score by quarters: 2–1, 2–2, 2–2, 1–4 | | | ABDA Arena (Indoor pool), Bauru |

==== Final ====
| 7 September 2025; 19:30 | Report | Brazil | 15–8 | United States | ABDA Arena (Indoor pool), Bauru |
| 7 September 2025; 19:30 | Report | Score by quarters: 4–1, 4–2, 3–3, 4–2 | | | ABDA Arena (Indoor pool), Bauru |

== Final standings ==
| Rank | Team |
|---|---|
| 1st place, gold medalist(s) | Brazil |
| 2nd place, silver medalist(s) | United States |
| 3rd place, bronze medalist(s) | Canada |
| 4 | Argentina |
| 5 | Puerto Rico |
| 6 | Mexico |
| 7 | Peru |
| 8 | Uruguay |
| 9 | Chile |
