= Pan American Aquatics U15 Water Polo Championships =

International youth water polo competition

- Current season, competition or edition: 2025 Pan American Aquatics U15 Water Polo Championships – Men's tournament 2025 Pan American Aquatics U15 Water Polo Championships – Women's tournament
- Sport: Water polo
- Founded: 2023
- Organizing body: PanAm Aquatics
- Continent: Americas
- Most recent champions: Men: Brazil (1st title); Women: United States (1st title)
- Most titles: Men: Brazil; United States (1 title each); Women: Colombia; United States (1 title each)
- Qualification: World Aquatics U16 Water Polo Championships
- Related competitions: Pan American Aquatics U17 Water Polo Championships; Pan American Aquatics U19 Water Polo Championships

The Pan American Aquatics U15 Water Polo Championships are international water polo tournaments for under-15 boys' and girls' national water polo teams from North and South America, organized by PanAm Aquatics (UANA or ASUA). They also serve as continental qualifiers for the U16 World Championship.

== Men's competition ==
=== Medalists ===
Year	Host	Champion	Runner-up	Third place	Ref
2023	Lima, Peru	United States	Colombia	Peru	
2025	Bauru, Brazil	Brazil	United States	Canada	

=== Medal table ===
Rank	Nation	Gold	Silver	Bronze	Total
1	United States	1	1	0	2
2	Brazil	1	0	0	1
3	Colombia	0	1	0	1
4	Canada	0	0	1	1
4	Peru	0	0	1	1
Totals (5 entries)		2	2	2	6

== Women's competition ==
=== Medalists ===
Year	Host	Champion	Runner-up	Third place	Ref
2023	Lima, Peru	Colombia	Mexico	Peru	
2025	Bauru, Brazil	United States	Canada	Brazil	

=== Medal table ===
Rank	Nation	Gold	Silver	Bronze	Total
1	Colombia	1	0	0	1
1	United States	1	0	0	1
3	Canada	0	1	0	1
3	Mexico	0	1	0	1
5	Brazil	0	0	1	1
5	Peru	0	0	1	1
Totals (6 entries)		2	2	2	6

== See also ==
- Pan American Aquatics U17 Water Polo Championships
