= 2026 World Aquatics Men's U16 Water Polo Championships =

International youth men's water polo tournament

Tournament details
- Host country: Croatia
- City: Zagreb
- Venues: 2 (in 1 host city)
- Dates: 3–9 August 2026
- Teams: 36 (from 5 confederations)

Final positions
- Champions: Croatia (1st title)
- Runners-up: Spain
- Third place: Serbia
- Fourth place: United States

Official website
- www.worldaquatics.com

The 2026 World Aquatics Men's U16 Water Polo Championships was the third edition of the men's U16 Water Polo World Championship. The tournament was played in Zagreb, Croatia, from 3 to 9 August 2026.

36 teams participated in the tournament. The host team, Croatia, secured their first ever title with a victory over Spain in the final, 10–7.

== Hosts selection ==
Zagreb in Croatia was given the hosting rights on 7 January 2026.

== Participating teams ==
Africa

- Egypt
- South Africa
- Zimbabwe

Americas

- Brazil
- Canada
- Mexico
- Peru
- Puerto Rico
- United States
- Uruguay

Asia

- China
- Kazakhstan
- Malaysia
- Singapore

Europe

- Croatia (hosts)
- Czech Republic
- Georgia
- Germany
- Greece
- Hungary
- Israel
- Italy
- Malta
- Montenegro
- Netherlands
- Poland
- Portugal
- Romania
- Russia
- Serbia
- Slovenia
- Spain
- Turkey
- Ukraine

Oceania

- Australia
- New Zealand

== Format ==
The tournament consisted of two phases:

Group stage

All 36 participating teams played in one common group. Each team played four matches. The first 32 teams advanced to the knockout stage.

Knockout stage / Consolation

Based on their group placement, each team was placed in one of four playoff sections: 1st–8th place, 9th–16th place, 17th–24th place and 25th–32nd place; all of which were played as a series of playoffs, consolation playoffs and final classification matches. The teams from 33rd to 36th place were dropped to the consolation group, which was played in a round-robin format.

== Group stage ==
Positions in the table are determined by the Tournament Performance Index (TPI) rather than total points. The TPI is calculated as the arithmetic average of match performance scores, factoring in the match outcome, goal difference, and the opponent's strength (Elo rating).

| Pos | Team | Pld | W | PSW | PSL | L | GF | GA | GD | TPI | Qualification |
|---|---|---|---|---|---|---|---|---|---|---|---|
| 1 | Russia | 4 | 3 | 1 | 0 | 0 | 50 | 18 | 32 | 94.5 | Quarterfinals |
| 2 | Brazil | 4 | 4 | 0 | 0 | 0 | 51 | 27 | 24 | 91.5 | Quarterfinals |
| 3 | Croatia (H) | 4 | 4 | 0 | 0 | 0 | 66 | 23 | 43 | 91.2 | Quarterfinals |
| 4 | Italy | 4 | 3 | 0 | 0 | 1 | 73 | 23 | 50 | 88.7 | Quarterfinals |
| 5 | Spain | 4 | 3 | 0 | 0 | 1 | 69 | 25 | 44 | 88.1 | Quarterfinals |
| 6 | Egypt | 4 | 4 | 0 | 0 | 0 | 68 | 20 | 48 | 87.8 | Quarterfinals |
| 7 | Serbia | 4 | 4 | 0 | 0 | 0 | 76 | 24 | 52 | 86.3 | Quarterfinals |
| 8 | United States | 4 | 4 | 0 | 0 | 0 | 65 | 17 | 48 | 86.3 | Quarterfinals |
| 9 | Turkey | 4 | 3 | 0 | 0 | 1 | 52 | 25 | 27 | 85.3 | 9th–16th place playoffs |
| 10 | Malta | 4 | 2 | 1 | 0 | 1 | 37 | 37 | 0 | 84.1 | 9th–16th place playoffs |
| 11 | Hungary | 4 | 3 | 0 | 0 | 1 | 54 | 25 | 29 | 83.8 | 9th–16th place playoffs |
| 12 | Romania | 4 | 3 | 0 | 0 | 1 | 43 | 24 | 19 | 79.9 | 9th–16th place playoffs |
| 13 | Greece | 4 | 3 | 0 | 0 | 1 | 48 | 26 | 22 | 79.2 | 9th–16th place playoffs |
| 14 | Germany | 4 | 2 | 0 | 0 | 2 | 62 | 24 | 38 | 77.8 | 9th–16th place playoffs |
| 15 | New Zealand | 4 | 3 | 0 | 0 | 1 | 46 | 40 | 6 | 77.7 | 9th–16th place playoffs |
| 16 | Australia | 4 | 2 | 0 | 0 | 2 | 34 | 44 | −10 | 74.5 | 9th–16th place playoffs |
| 17 | Montenegro | 4 | 3 | 0 | 1 | 0 | 65 | 30 | 35 | 74.3 | 17th–24th place playoffs |
| 18 | Singapore | 4 | 2 | 0 | 1 | 1 | 45 | 50 | −5 | 73.3 | 17th–24th place playoffs |
| 19 | Georgia | 4 | 2 | 0 | 0 | 2 | 34 | 44 | −10 | 73 | 17th–24th place playoffs |
| 20 | Netherlands | 4 | 2 | 0 | 0 | 2 | 48 | 34 | 14 | 71.8 | 17th–24th place playoffs |
| 21 | Poland | 4 | 2 | 0 | 0 | 2 | 28 | 49 | −21 | 71.1 | 17th–24th place playoffs |
| 22 | Kazakhstan | 4 | 1 | 1 | 0 | 2 | 51 | 46 | 5 | 64.8 | 17th–24th place playoffs |
| 23 | Canada | 4 | 1 | 0 | 0 | 3 | 34 | 50 | −16 | 62.8 | 17th–24th place playoffs |
| 24 | Peru | 4 | 1 | 0 | 0 | 3 | 27 | 46 | −19 | 62.5 | 17th–24th place playoffs |
| 25 | Ukraine | 4 | 1 | 0 | 0 | 3 | 42 | 44 | −2 | 59.9 | 25th–32nd place playoffs |
| 26 | Slovenia | 4 | 1 | 0 | 0 | 3 | 39 | 36 | 3 | 57.5 | 25th–32nd place playoffs |
| 27 | Portugal | 4 | 1 | 0 | 0 | 3 | 34 | 47 | −13 | 54 | 25th–32nd place playoffs |
| 28 | South Africa | 4 | 0 | 0 | 0 | 4 | 26 | 46 | −20 | 53.8 | 25th–32nd place playoffs |
| 29 | Israel | 4 | 1 | 0 | 0 | 3 | 25 | 40 | −15 | 51.3 | 25th–32nd place playoffs |
| 30 | China | 4 | 0 | 0 | 1 | 3 | 25 | 53 | −28 | 51.1 | 25th–32nd place playoffs |
| 31 | Zimbabwe | 4 | 0 | 0 | 0 | 4 | 10 | 93 | −83 | 50.6 | 25th–32nd place playoffs |
| 32 | Czech Republic | 4 | 1 | 0 | 0 | 3 | 14 | 71 | −57 | 49.4 | 25th–32nd place playoffs |
| 33 | Mexico | 4 | 0 | 0 | 0 | 4 | 23 | 55 | −32 | 48.1 | 33rd–36th place classification |
| 34 | Puerto Rico | 4 | 0 | 0 | 0 | 4 | 11 | 86 | −75 | 46.9 | 33rd–36th place classification |
| 35 | Malaysia | 4 | 0 | 0 | 0 | 4 | 13 | 78 | −65 | 42.7 | 33rd–36th place classification |
| 36 | Uruguay | 4 | 0 | 0 | 0 | 4 | 15 | 83 | −68 | 38.5 | 33rd–36th place classification |

Source: results.microplustimingservices.com
(H) Hosts

== 33rd–36th place classification ==
| Pos | Team | Pld | W | PSW | PSL | L | GF | GA | GD | Pts |
|---|---|---|---|---|---|---|---|---|---|---|
| 33 | Mexico | 3 | 3 | 0 | 0 | 0 | 39 | 19 | 20 | 9 |
| 34 | Malaysia | 3 | 2 | 0 | 0 | 1 | 36 | 29 | 7 | 6 |
| 35 | Puerto Rico | 3 | 1 | 0 | 0 | 2 | 25 | 42 | −17 | 3 |
| 36 | Uruguay | 3 | 0 | 0 | 0 | 3 | 19 | 29 | −10 | 0 |

Source: results.microplustimingservices.com

== 25th–32nd place playoffs ==
29st place match
27 | Portugal | 8
28 | South Africa | 7
31st place match
31 | Zimbabwe | 7
32 | Czech Republic | 8

29th–32nd place semifinals
27 | Portugal | 18
31 | Zimbabwe | 2
28 | South Africa | 12
32 | Czech Republic | 7

25th–32nd place quarterfinals
27 | Portugal | 8
30 | China | 14
26 | Slovenia | 20
31 | Zimbabwe | 1
28 | South Africa | 6
29 | Israel | 9
25 | Ukraine | 12
32 | Czech Republic | 3

25th–28th place semifinals
30 | China | 8
26 | Slovenia | 7
29 | Israel | 5
25 | Ukraine | 6

25th place match
30 | China | 9
25 | Ukraine | 11
27th place match
26 | Slovenia | 6
29 | Israel | 17

== 17th–24th place playoffs ==
21st place match
23 | Canada | 11
21 | Poland | 7
23th place match
22 | Kazakhstan | 5
24 | Peru | 3

21st–24th place semifinals
22 | Kazakhstan | 7
23 | Canada | 9
21 | Poland | 7
24 | Peru | 5

17th–24th place quarterfinals
19 | Georgia | 10
22 | Kazakhstan | 7
18 | Singapore | 9
23 | Canada | 8
20 | Netherlands | 13
21 | Poland | 6
17 | Montenegro | 15
24 | Peru | 3

17th–20th place semifinals
19 | Georgia | 13 (2)
18 | Singapore (PSO) | 13 (3)
20 | Netherlands | 7
17 | Montenegro | 15

17th place match
18 | Singapore | 5
17 | Montenegro | 16
19th place match
19 | Georgia | 4
20 | Netherlands | 16

== 9th–16th place playoffs ==
13th place match
14 | Germany | 10
16 | Australia | 5
15th place match
15 | New Zealand | 12
12 | Romania | 10

13th–16th place semifinals
14 | Germany | 11
15 | New Zealand | 8
12 | Romania | 5
16 | Australia | 8

9th–16th place quarterfinals
11 | Hungary | 13
14 | Germany | 11
10 | Malta | 15
15 | New Zealand | 12
12 | Romania | 7
13 | Greece | 11
9 | Turkey | 5
16 | Australia | 4

9th–12th place semifinals
11 | Hungary | 12
10 | Malta | 2
13 | Greece | 14
9 | Turkey | 5

9th place match
11 | Hungary | 16
13 | Greece | 13
11th place match
10 | Malta | 8
9 | Turkey | 6

== Championship playoffs ==
5th place match
2 | Brazil | 5
1 | Russia | 10
7th place match
6 | Egypt | 7
4 | Italy | 14

5th–8th place semifinals
6 | Egypt | 9
2 | Brazil | 11
4 | Italy | 7
1 | Russia | 8

Quarterfinals
3 | Croatia | 15
6 | Egypt | 3
2 | Brazil | 7
7 | Serbia | 11
4 | Italy | 13 (1)
5 | Spain (PSO) | 13 (4)
1 | Russia | 8
8 | United States | 10

Semifinals
3 | Croatia | 12
7 | Serbia | 11
5 | Spain (PSO) | 10 (7)
8 | United States | 10 (6)

Final
3 | Croatia | 10
5 | Spain | 7
3rd place match
7 | Serbia (PSO) | 9 (4)
8 | United States | 9 (2)

== Final standings ==
| Rank | Team |
|---|---|
| 1st place, gold medalist(s) | Croatia |
| 2nd place, silver medalist(s) | Spain |
| 3rd place, bronze medalist(s) | Serbia |
| 4 | United States |
| 5 | Russia |
| 6 | Brazil |
| 7 | Italy |
| 8 | Egypt |
| 9 | Hungary |
| 10 | Greece |
| 11 | Malta |
| 12 | Turkey |

| Rank | Team |
|---|---|
| 13 | Germany |
| 14 | Australia |
| 15 | New Zealand |
| 16 | Romania |
| 17 | Montenegro |
| 18 | Singapore |
| 19 | Netherlands |
| 20 | Georgia |
| 21 | Canada |
| 22 | Poland |
| 23 | Kazakhstan |
| 24 | Peru |

| Rank | Team |
|---|---|
| 25 | Ukraine |
| 26 | China |
| 27 | Israel |
| 28 | Slovenia |
| 29 | Portugal |
| 30 | South Africa |
| 31 | Czech Republic |
| 32 | Zimbabwe |
| 33 | Mexico |
| 34 | Malaysia |
| 35 | Puerto Rico |
| 36 | Uruguay |

=== Awards ===
- MVP of the final match: (Croatia) Ante Domazet
- MVP of the tournament: (Croatia) Deni Sappe

== Squads ==
- Croatia (champions)

Luko Vezilić (captain), Roko Koncul, Toma Bošnjak, Petar Lončarić, Patrik Kundid, Bartol Smoje, Toni Cvitan, Deni Sappe, Vlaho Rajčević, Duje Srzić, Vito Lokas, Andrija Bujas, Karlo Gale, Ante Domazet, Luka Terzić. Coach: Bruno Sabioni.
