= 2025 Pan American Aquatics U15 Water Polo Championships – Women's tournament =

2025 PanAm Aquatics U15 Women's Water Polo Championship

Tournament details
- Host country: Brazil
- City: Bauru
- Venue: 1 (in 1 host city)
- Dates: 1–7 September
- Teams: 8 (from 1 confederation)

Final positions
- Champions: United States (1st title)
- Runners-up: Canada
- Third place: Brazil
- Fourth place: Argentina

Official website
- bauru2025

The 2025 PanAm Aquatics U15 Water Polo Championships – Women's tournament was the second edition of the Pan American under-15 women's water polo championship, organized by the PanAm Aquatics. The event was held in Bauru, Brazil, from 1 to 7 September 2025.

Players born in 2010 or later were eligible to participate.

== Format ==
Eight teams entered the championship. They were divided into two tiered groups of four (the Gold Group and the Silver Group) according to their position in the World Aquatics girls' ranking. Groups were played in a three-match round-robin format. All teams advanced to the playoffs with consolations, where they all played three more matches.

== Group stage ==
All times are local (Brasília time; UTC-3).

=== Gold Group ===
Pos	Team	Pld	W	PSW	PSL	L	GF	GA	GD	Pts
1	United States	3	2	1	0	0	37	26	+11	8
2	Brazil	3	2	0	1	0	40	22	+18	7
3	Canada	3	1	0	0	2	36	29	+7	3
4	Argentina	3	0	0	0	3	20	56	−36	0

Source: bauru2025.panamaquaticsevents.com

1 September 2025; 11:40	Report	United States	10–9	Canada	ABDA Arena (Indoor pool), Bauru
1 September 2025; 11:40	Report	Score by quarters: 3–2, 2–0, 2–3, 3–4			ABDA Arena (Indoor pool), Bauru

1 September 2025; 13:00	Report	Brazil	19–5	Argentina	ABDA Arena (Indoor pool), Bauru
1 September 2025; 13:00	Report	Score by quarters: 6–3, 5–1, 5–1, 3–0			ABDA Arena (Indoor pool), Bauru

2 September 2025; 16:00	Report	Argentina	8–18	United States	ABDA Arena (Indoor pool), Bauru
2 September 2025; 16:00	Report	Score by quarters: 4–6, 2–6, 1–2, 1–4			ABDA Arena (Indoor pool), Bauru

2 September 2025; 17:20	Report	Canada	8–12	Brazil	ABDA Arena (Indoor pool), Bauru
2 September 2025; 17:20	Report	Score by quarters: 1–4, 1–4, 3–1, 3–3			ABDA Arena (Indoor pool), Bauru

3 September 2025; 16:00	Report	Argentina	7–19	Canada	ABDA Arena (Indoor pool), Bauru
3 September 2025; 16:00	Report	Score by quarters: 2–6, 2–7, 2–3, 1–3			ABDA Arena (Indoor pool), Bauru

3 September 2025; 17:20	Report	Brazil	9–9; PSO: 6–7	United States	ABDA Arena (Indoor pool), Bauru
3 September 2025; 17:20	Report	Score by quarters: 3–3, 2–0, 3–3, 1–3			ABDA Arena (Indoor pool), Bauru

=== Silver Group ===
Pos	Team	Pld	W	PSW	PSL	L	GF	GA	GD	Pts
1	Peru	3	3	0	0	0	57	19	+38	9
2	Mexico	3	2	0	0	1	28	37	−9	6
3	Puerto Rico	3	0	1	0	2	25	43	−18	2
4	Chile	3	0	0	1	2	25	36	−11	1

Source: bauru2025.panamaquaticsevents.com

1 September 2025; 09:00	Report	Peru	25–8	Puerto Rico	ABDA Arena (Indoor pool), Bauru
1 September 2025; 09:00	Report	Score by quarters: 9–2, 5–3, 4–2, 7–1			ABDA Arena (Indoor pool), Bauru

1 September 2025; 10:20	Report	Chile	11–13	Mexico	ABDA Arena (Indoor pool), Bauru
1 September 2025; 10:20	Report	Score by quarters: 2–3, 3–4, 3–3, 3–3			ABDA Arena (Indoor pool), Bauru

2 September 2025; 13:20	Report	Puerto Rico	7–7; PSO: 4–3	Chile	ABDA Arena (Indoor pool), Bauru
2 September 2025; 13:20	Report	Score by quarters: 0–2, 2–1, 2–1, 3–3			ABDA Arena (Indoor pool), Bauru

2 September 2025; 14:40	Report	Mexico	4–16	Peru	ABDA Arena (Indoor pool), Bauru
2 September 2025; 14:40	Report	Score by quarters: 0–5, 1–2, 1–7, 2–2			ABDA Arena (Indoor pool), Bauru

3 September 2025; 13:20	Report	Puerto Rico	10–11	Mexico	ABDA Arena (Indoor pool), Bauru
3 September 2025; 13:20	Report	Score by quarters: 3–3, 3–2, 2–2, 2–4			ABDA Arena (Indoor pool), Bauru

3 September 2025; 14:40	Report	Peru	16–7	Chile	ABDA Arena (Indoor pool), Bauru
3 September 2025; 14:40	Report	Score by quarters: 2–3, 6–2, 5–0, 3–2			ABDA Arena (Indoor pool), Bauru

== Playoffs ==
=== Bracket ===
5th place match
7 September
Peru	21
Mexico	4
7th place match
7 September
Chile	15
Puerto Rico	11

5th–8th place semifinals
6 September
Chile	9
Peru	16
6 September
Puerto Rico	15
Mexico	18

Quarterfinals
4 September
A1	United States	18
B4	Chile	1
4 September
B1	Peru	7
A4	Argentina	11
4 September
A2	Brazil	17
B3	Puerto Rico	6
4 September
B2	Mexico	2
A3	Canada	28

Semifinals
6 September
United States	18
Argentina	10
6 September
Brazil	14
Canada	15

Final
7 September
United States	14
Canada	8
3rd place match
7 September
Argentina	11
Brazil	27

=== Quarterfinals ===
4 September 2025; 10:20	Report	United States	18–1	Chile	ABDA Arena (Indoor pool), Bauru
4 September 2025; 10:20	Report	Score by quarters: 4–0, 7–0, 4–0, 3–1			ABDA Arena (Indoor pool), Bauru

4 September 2025; 11:40	Report	Brazil	17–6	Puerto Rico	ABDA Arena (Indoor pool), Bauru
4 September 2025; 11:40	Report	Score by quarters: 4–0, 7–3, 2–0, 4–3			ABDA Arena (Indoor pool), Bauru

4 September 2025; 13:00	Report	Mexico	2–28	Canada	ABDA Arena (Indoor pool), Bauru
4 September 2025; 13:00	Report	Score by quarters: 2–6, 0–6, 0–8, 0–8			ABDA Arena (Indoor pool), Bauru

4 September 2025; 14:20	Report	Peru	7–11	Argentina	ABDA Arena (Indoor pool), Bauru
4 September 2025; 14:20	Report	Score by quarters: 3–1, 2–2, 0–4, 2–4			ABDA Arena (Indoor pool), Bauru

=== 5th–8th place semifinals ===
6 September 2025; 9:00	Report	Chile	9–16	Peru	ABDA Arena (Indoor pool), Bauru
6 September 2025; 9:00	Report	Score by quarters: 1–6, 3–4, 1–4, 4–2			ABDA Arena (Indoor pool), Bauru

6 September 2025; 10:30	Report	Puerto Rico	15–18	Mexico	ABDA Arena (Indoor pool), Bauru
6 September 2025; 10:30	Report	Score by quarters: 4–4, 3–5, 4–5, 4–4			ABDA Arena (Indoor pool), Bauru

==== 7th place match ====
7 September 2025; 10:30	Report	Chile	15–11	Puerto Rico	ABDA Arena (Indoor pool), Bauru
7 September 2025; 10:30	Report	Score by quarters: 3–3, 4–3, 6–2, 2–3			ABDA Arena (Indoor pool), Bauru

==== 5th place match ====
7 September 2025; 12:00	Report	Peru	21–4	Mexico	ABDA Arena (Indoor pool), Bauru
7 September 2025; 12:00	Report	Score by quarters: 4–1, 4–0, 7–1, 6–2			ABDA Arena (Indoor pool), Bauru

=== Semifinals ===
6 September 2025; 12:00	Report	United States	18–10	Argentina	ABDA Arena (Indoor pool), Bauru
6 September 2025; 12:00	Report	Score by quarters: 6–2, 3–1, 2–2, 7–5			ABDA Arena (Indoor pool), Bauru

6 September 2025; 13:30	Report	Brazil	14–15	Canada	ABDA Arena (Indoor pool), Bauru
6 September 2025; 13:30	Report	Score by quarters: 4–2, 2–5, 5–3, 3–5			ABDA Arena (Indoor pool), Bauru

==== 3rd place match ====
7 September 2025; 15:00	Report	Argentina	11–27	Brazil	ABDA Arena (Indoor pool), Bauru
7 September 2025; 15:00	Report	Score by quarters: 1–7, 6–3, 2–8, 2–9			ABDA Arena (Indoor pool), Bauru

==== Final ====
7 September 2025; 18:00	Report	United States	14–8	Canada	ABDA Arena (Indoor pool), Bauru
7 September 2025; 18:00	Report	Score by quarters: 4–1, 3–4, 3–2, 4–1			ABDA Arena (Indoor pool), Bauru

== Final standings ==
Rank	Team
1st place, gold medalist(s)	United States
2nd place, silver medalist(s)	Canada
3rd place, bronze medalist(s)	Brazil
4	Argentina
5	Peru
6	Mexico
7	Chile
8	Puerto Rico
