= United States women's national cadet water polo team =

- FINA code: USA
- Association: USA Water Polo
- Confederation: UANA (Americas)

U16 World Championship
- Appearances: 3 (first in 2022)
- Best result: 5th (2026)

Pan American Championship (U19 / U17)
- Appearances: 2 (first in 2024)
- Best result: (2025)

U15 Pan American Championship
- Appearances: 1 (first in 2025)
- Best result: (2025)

Media
- Website: usawaterpolo.org
Medal record
Women's water polo
Pan American Championship (U19 / U17)
Gold medal – first place	2025 Medellin	Team
Bronze medal – third place	2024 San Salvador	Team
U15 Pan American Championship
Gold medal – first place	2025 Bauru	Team

The United States women's national cadet water polo team represents the United States in women's World Aquatics U16 Water Polo Championships. It is an international water polo tournament held every two years for the players under the age of 16. It was launched by World Aquatics in 2022.

== Results ==
=== Major tournaments ===
==== Competitive record ====
Tournament	Appearances	Finishes				
Tournament	Appearances	Champions	Runners-up	Third place	Fourth place	Total
U16 World Championship	3	0	0	0	0	0
Pan American Championship (U19 / U17)	2	1	0	1	0	2
U15 Pan American Championship	1	1	0	0	0	1
Total	6	2	0	1	0	3

==== U16 World Championship ====
Year	Result	Pld	W	L	D
(Greece) 2022	Round robin	8	4	3	1
(Turkey) 2024	7th place	6	4	2	0
(Croatia) 2026	5th place	7	6	1	0
Total	0 Title	21	14	6	1

==== Pan American Championship (U19 / U17) ====
Year	Result	Pld	W	L	D
(El Salvador) 2024	Bronze medal	7	5	2	0
(Colombia) 2025	Gold medal	7	7	0	0
Total	1 Title	14	12	2	0

==== U15 Pan American Championship ====
Year	Result	Pld	W	L	D
(Peru) 2023	Did not participated				
(Brazil) 2025	Gold medal	6	5	0	1
Total	1 Title	6	5	0	1
