= Croatia men's national under-16 water polo team =

- FINA code: CRO
- Confederation: LEN (Europe)
- Head coach: Bruno Sabioni
- Asst coach: Marko Jelavić
- Captain: Luko Vezilić
- Best result: 1st (2026)

Media
- Website: hvs.hr/tim/529/ (in Croatian))

Croatia men's national under-16 water polo team (Croatian: Hrvatska vaterpolska reprezentacija do 16 godina) is a Croatian national men's water polo team for players under 16 years old, under supervision of the Croatian Water Polo Federation (HVS). They are current World Champions (2026).

== Results ==
=== World Championships ===
1. 2022: ?
2. 2024: 7th place
3. 2026: champions

== Squads ==
- 2026 World Champions

Luko Vezilić (captain), Roko Koncul, Toma Bošnjak, Petar Lončarić, Patrik Kundid, Bartol Smoje, Toni Cvitan, Deni Sappe, Vlaho Rajčević, Duje Srzić, Vito Lokas, Andrija Bujas, Karlo Gale, Ante Domazet, Luka Terzić.

Coach: Bruno Sabioni, assistant coach: Marko Jelavić, goalkeeper coach: Niko Kožul, video-analyst: Jakov Igrec, physiotherapist: Ante Divković.

== See also ==
- Croatia men's national under-18 water polo team
- Croatia men's national water polo team
