= 2026 World Aquatics Women's U16 Water Polo Championships =

International youth women's water polo tournament

Tournament details
- Host country: Croatia
- City: Zagreb
- Venues: 2 (in 1 host city)
- Dates: 25–31 July 2026
- Teams: 24 (from 5 confederations)

Final positions
- Champions: Greece (1st title)
- Runners-up: Spain
- Third place: Netherlands
- Fourth place: Hungary

Official website
- www.worldaquatics.com

The 2026 World Aquatics Women's U16 Water Polo Championships was the third edition of the women's U16 Water Polo World Championship. The tournament was played in Zagreb, Croatia, from 25 to 31 July 2026.

24 teams participated in the tournament. Greece secured their first ever title with a victory over Spain in the final, 11–7.

== Hosts selection ==
Zagreb in Croatia was given the hosting rights on 7 January 2026.

== Participating teams ==
Africa

- South Africa
- Zimbabwe

Americas

- Brazil
- Canada
- Mexico
- Peru
- United States

Asia

- China

Europe

- Croatia (hosts)
- Czech Republic
- Germany
- Greece
- Hungary
- Israel
- Italy
- Netherlands
- Romania
- Russia
- Serbia
- Spain
- Turkey
- Ukraine

Oceania

- Australia
- New Zealand

== Format ==
The tournament consisted of two phases:

Group stage

All 24 participating teams played in one common group. Each team played four matches. All teams advanced to the knockout stage.

Knockout stage

Based on their group placement, each team was placed in one of three playoff sections: 1st–8th place, 9th–16th place and 17th–24th place; all of which were played as a series of playoffs, consolation playoffs and final classification matches.

== Group stage ==
Positions in the table are determined by the Tournament Performance Index (TPI) rather than total points. The TPI is calculated as the arithmetic average of match performance scores, factoring in the match outcome, goal difference, and the opponent's strength (Elo rating).

Pos	Team	Pld	W	PSW	PSL	L	GF	GA	GD	TPI	Qualification
1	Greece	4	4	0	0	0	66	16	50	89.3	Quarterfinals
2	Russia	4	4	0	0	0	48	24	24	85.6	Quarterfinals
3	Australia	4	4	0	0	0	45	26	19	83.2	Quarterfinals
4	United States	4	4	0	0	0	55	12	43	81.8	Quarterfinals
5	Hungary	4	3	1	0	0	67	18	49	80.8	Quarterfinals
6	Spain	4	3	0	0	1	40	23	17	76	Quarterfinals
7	Netherlands	4	3	0	0	1	57	25	32	75.4	Quarterfinals
8	New Zealand	4	3	0	0	1	35	21	14	73.8	Quarterfinals
9	Serbia	4	3	0	0	1	36	35	1	72	9th–16th place playoffs
10	Turkey	4	2	0	0	2	34	31	3	65	9th–16th place playoffs
11	China	4	2	0	0	2	43	24	19	64.3	9th–16th place playoffs
12	Israel	4	2	0	0	2	36	40	−4	63.1	9th–16th place playoffs
13	Italy	4	2	0	0	2	30	26	4	63	9th–16th place playoffs
14	Ukraine	4	1	1	0	2	27	43	−16	59	9th–16th place playoffs
15	Czech Republic	4	2	0	0	2	39	52	−13	58.4	9th–16th place playoffs
16	Canada	4	1	0	1	2	42	38	4	54.9	9th–16th place playoffs
17	Peru	4	0	1	0	3	13	55	−42	49.9	17th–24th place playoffs
18	South Africa	4	1	0	0	3	24	45	−21	49	17th–24th place playoffs
19	Germany	4	1	0	1	2	21	36	−15	48.8	17th–24th place playoffs
20	Croatia (H)	4	0	0	0	4	28	49	−21	45	17th–24th place playoffs
21	Romania	4	0	0	1	3	20	55	−35	44.5	17th–24th place playoffs
22	Brazil	4	0	0	0	4	20	46	−26	44	17th–24th place playoffs
23	Mexico	4	0	0	0	4	15	69	−54	38.8	17th–24th place playoffs
24	Zimbabwe	4	0	0	0	4	16	48	−32	38	17th–24th place playoffs

Source: results.microplustimingservices.com
Rules for classification: 1) Tournament Performance Index; 2) goal difference; 3) number of goals scored; 4) World Rankings
(H) Hosts

== 17th–24th place playoffs ==
21st place match
22	Brazil	8
21	Romania	9
23th place match
23	Mexico	3
24	Zimbabwe	7

21st–24th place semifinals
22	Brazil	9
23	Mexico	1
21	Romania	6
24	Zimbabwe	3

17th–24th place quarterfinals
19	Germany	8
22	Brazil	7
18	South Africa	10
23	Mexico	6
20	Croatia	8
21	Romania	7
17	Peru	7
24	Zimbabwe	5

17th–20th place semifinals
19	Germany	9
18	South Africa	4
20	Croatia	13
17	Peru	6

17th place match
19	Germany	8
20	Croatia	16
19th place match
18	South Africa (PSO)	6 (4)
17	Peru	6 (2)

== 9th–16th place playoffs ==
13th place match
15	Czech Republic	2
16	Canada	19
15th place match
14	Ukraine	12
12	Israel	11

13th–16th place semifinals
14	Ukraine	10
15	Czech Republic	11
12	Israel	4
16	Canada	7

9th–16th place quarterfinals
11	China	11
14	Ukraine	7
10	Turkey	19
15	Czech Republic	6
12	Israel	5
13	Italy	12
9	Serbia (PSO)	13 (5)
16	Canada	13 (3)

9th–12th place semifinals
11	China	7
10	Turkey	10
13	Italy	9
9	Serbia	4

9th place match
10	Turkey	7
13	Italy	8
11th place match
11	China (PSO)	8 (3)
9	Serbia	8 (1)

== Championship playoffs ==
5th place match
2	Russia	7
4	United States	11
7th place match
3	Australia	8
8	New Zealand	7

5th–8th place semifinals
3	Australia	10
2	Russia	13
4	United States	15
8	New Zealand	5

Quarterfinals
3	Australia	6
6	Spain	9
2	Russia	7
7	Netherlands	10
4	United States	9
5	Hungary	13
1	Greece	11
8	New Zealand	5

Semifinals
6	Spain	17
7	Netherlands	5
5	Hungary	8
1	Greece	14

Final
6	Spain	7
1	Greece	11
3rd place match
7	Netherlands (PSO)	11 (4)
5	Hungary	11 (3)

== Final standings ==
Rank	Team
1st place, gold medalist(s)	Greece
2nd place, silver medalist(s)	Spain
3rd place, bronze medalist(s)	Netherlands
4	Hungary
5	United States
6	Russia
7	Australia
8	New Zealand
9	Italy
10	Turkey
11	China
12	Serbia

Rank	Team
13	Canada
14	Czech Republic
15	Ukraine
16	Israel
17	Croatia
18	Germany
19	South Africa
20	Peru
21	Romania
22	Brazil
23	Zimbabwe
24	Mexico
