= 2023 Pan American Aquatics U15 Water Polo Championships – Women's tournament =

Tournament details
- Host country: Peru
- City: Lima
- Venue: 1 (in 1 host city)
- Dates: 28 August – 3 September
- Teams: 3 (from 1 confederation)

Final positions
- Champions: Colombia (1st title)
- Runners-up: Mexico
- Third place: Peru

The 2023 PanAm Aquatics U15 Water Polo Championships – Women's tournament was the inaugural edition of the Pan American under-15 women's water polo championship, organized by the PanAm Aquatics. The event was held in Lima, Peru, from 28 August to 3 September 2023.

Players born in 2008 or later were eligible to participate.

== Format ==
Three teams entered the championship. In the first round, all teams played triple-round-robin in one common group. All teams advanced to the final round, which was played in a single-round-robin format. The final standings of the final round group are also the final standings of the tournament.

All times are local (Peru Time; UTC-5).

== First round ==
Pos	Team	Pld	W	PSW	PSL	L	GF	GA	GD	Pts	Qualification
1	Colombia	6	6	0	0	0	84	26	+58	18	Final round
2	Mexico	6	2	1	0	3	46	66	−20	8	Final round
3	Peru	6	0	0	1	5	25	63	−38	1	Final round

Source: lima2023.panamaquaticsevents.com

28 August 2023; 9:00	Report	Colombia	17–9	Mexico	Villa Deportiva Nacional (Pool), Lima
28 August 2023; 9:00	Report	Score by quarters: 6–0, 3–0, 4–4, 4–5			Villa Deportiva Nacional (Pool), Lima

28 August 2023; 16:00	Report	Peru	1–12	Colombia	Villa Deportiva Nacional (Pool), Lima
28 August 2023; 16:00	Report	Score by quarters: 0–9, 1–3, 0–0, 0–0			Villa Deportiva Nacional (Pool), Lima

29 August 2023; 9:00	Report	Mexico	7–7; PSO: 3–2	Peru	Villa Deportiva Nacional (Pool), Lima
29 August 2023; 9:00	Report	Score by quarters: 3–1, 1–2, 2–2, 1–2			Villa Deportiva Nacional (Pool), Lima

29 August 2023; 16:00	Report	Mexico	8–17	Colombia	Villa Deportiva Nacional (Pool), Lima
29 August 2023; 16:00	Report	Score by quarters: 4–3, 1–5, 2–5, 1–4			Villa Deportiva Nacional (Pool), Lima

30 August 2023; 9:00	Report	Peru	1–11	Colombia	Villa Deportiva Nacional (Pool), Lima
30 August 2023; 9:00	Report	Score by quarters: 0–2, 1–7, 0–2, 0–0			Villa Deportiva Nacional (Pool), Lima

30 August 2023; 16:00	Report	Mexico	9–7	Peru	Villa Deportiva Nacional (Pool), Lima
30 August 2023; 16:00	Report	Score by quarters: 1–4, 4–1, 2–1, 2–1			Villa Deportiva Nacional (Pool), Lima

31 August 2023; 9:00	Report	Mexico	3–13	Colombia	Villa Deportiva Nacional (Pool), Lima
31 August 2023; 9:00	Report	Score by quarters: 2–5, 1–7, 0–1, 0–0			Villa Deportiva Nacional (Pool), Lima

31 August 2023; 16:00	Report	Peru	4–14	Colombia	Villa Deportiva Nacional (Pool), Lima
31 August 2023; 16:00	Report	Score by quarters: 0–6, 2–6, 1–2, 1–0			Villa Deportiva Nacional (Pool), Lima

1 September 2023; 9:00	Report	Mexico	10–5	Peru	Villa Deportiva Nacional (Pool), Lima
1 September 2023; 9:00	Report	Score by quarters: 2–2, 3–0, 3–1, 2–2			Villa Deportiva Nacional (Pool), Lima

== Final round ==
Pos	Team	Pld	W	PSW	PSL	L	GF	GA	GD	Pts
1st place, gold medalist(s)	Colombia	2	2	0	0	0	33	8	+25	6
2nd place, silver medalist(s)	Mexico	2	1	0	0	1	12	23	−11	3
3rd place, bronze medalist(s)	Peru	2	0	0	0	2	10	24	−14	0

Source: lima2023.panamaquaticsevents.com

1 September 2023; 15:30	Report	Colombia	15–5	Peru	Villa Deportiva Nacional (Pool), Lima
1 September 2023; 15:30	Report	Score by quarters: 9–1, 4–3, 2–1, 0–0			Villa Deportiva Nacional (Pool), Lima

2 September 2023; 16:30	Report	Mexico	9–5	Peru	Villa Deportiva Nacional (Pool), Lima
2 September 2023; 16:30	Report	Score by quarters: 2–1, 3–1, 3–0, 1–3			Villa Deportiva Nacional (Pool), Lima

3 September 2023; 9:30	Report	Colombia	18–3	Mexico	Villa Deportiva Nacional (Pool), Lima
3 September 2023; 9:30	Report	Score by quarters: 8–2, 10–1, 0–0, 0–0			Villa Deportiva Nacional (Pool), Lima
