= 2023 Pan American Aquatics U15 Water Polo Championships – Men's tournament =

Tournament details
- Host country: Peru
- City: Lima
- Venue: 1 (in 1 host city)
- Dates: 28 August – 3 September
- Teams: 8 (from 1 confederation)

Final positions
- Champions: United States (1st title)
- Runners-up: Colombia
- Third place: Peru
- Fourth place: Mexico

The 2023 PanAm Aquatics U15 Water Polo Championships – Men's tournament was the inaugural edition of the Pan American under-15 men's water polo championship, organized by the PanAm Aquatics. The event was held in Lima, Peru, from 28 August to 3 September 2023.

Players born in 2008 or later were eligible to participate.

== Format ==
Eight teams entered the championship. In the first round, all teams played round-robin in one common group. The top four teams advanced to the Platinum Series, while the bottom four teams advanced to the Gold Series. Both series were played in four-team round-robin groups, followed by two separate playoffs, each consisting of two semifinals, a third place match, and a final.

== First round ==
All times are local (Peru Time; UTC-5).

Pos	Team	Pld	W	PSW	PSL	L	GF	GA	GD	Pts	Qualification
1	United States	7	7	0	0	0	100	29	+71	21	Platinum Series
2	Colombia	7	6	0	0	1	92	54	+38	18	Platinum Series
3	Peru	7	5	0	0	2	73	59	+14	15	Platinum Series
4	Mexico	7	3	0	0	4	73	60	+13	9	Platinum Series
5	Puerto Rico	7	3	0	0	4	59	76	−17	9	Gold Series
6	Chile	7	3	0	0	4	54	57	−3	9	Gold Series
7	Venezuela	7	1	0	0	6	39	67	−28	3	Gold Series
8	Bolivia	7	0	0	0	7	7	95	−88	0	Gold Series

Source: lima2023.panamaquaticsevents.com

28 August 2023; 10:00	Report	Puerto Rico	11–1	Bolivia	Villa Deportiva Nacional (Pool), Lima
28 August 2023; 10:00	Report	Score by quarters: 4–0, 5–1, 2–0, 0–0			Villa Deportiva Nacional (Pool), Lima

28 August 2023; 11:00	Report	Chile	2–12	United States	Villa Deportiva Nacional (Pool), Lima
28 August 2023; 11:00	Report	Score by quarters: 0–3, 1–7, 1–2, 0–0			Villa Deportiva Nacional (Pool), Lima

28 August 2023; 12:00	Report	Mexico	14–6	Venezuela	Villa Deportiva Nacional (Pool), Lima
28 August 2023; 12:00	Report	Score by quarters: 1–1, 2–5, 3–0, 8–0			Villa Deportiva Nacional (Pool), Lima

28 August 2023; 13:00	Report	Colombia	13–11	Peru	Villa Deportiva Nacional (Pool), Lima
28 August 2023; 13:00	Report	Score by quarters: 5–3, 4–2, 3–5, 1–1			Villa Deportiva Nacional (Pool), Lima

28 August 2023; 17:00	Report	Chile	9–11	Puerto Rico	Villa Deportiva Nacional (Pool), Lima
28 August 2023; 17:00	Report	Score by quarters: 1–4, 1–2, 2–2, 5–3			Villa Deportiva Nacional (Pool), Lima

28 August 2023; 18:00	Report	Colombia	7–16	United States	Villa Deportiva Nacional (Pool), Lima
28 August 2023; 18:00	Report	Score by quarters: 1–3, 4–5, 2–4, 0–4			Villa Deportiva Nacional (Pool), Lima

28 August 2023; 19:00	Report	Mexico	21–0	Bolivia	Villa Deportiva Nacional (Pool), Lima
28 August 2023; 19:00	Report	Score by quarters: 10–0, 11–0, 0–0, 0–0			Villa Deportiva Nacional (Pool), Lima

28 August 2023; 20:00	Report	Venezuela	7–11	Peru	Villa Deportiva Nacional (Pool), Lima
28 August 2023; 20:00	Report	Score by quarters: 2–4, 1–3, 2–4, 2–0			Villa Deportiva Nacional (Pool), Lima

29 August 2023; 10:00	Report	Mexico	8–9	Chile	Villa Deportiva Nacional (Pool), Lima
29 August 2023; 10:00	Report	Score by quarters: 2–2, 3–1, 1–4, 2–2			Villa Deportiva Nacional (Pool), Lima

29 August 2023; 11:00	Report	Venezuela	12–2	Bolivia	Villa Deportiva Nacional (Pool), Lima
29 August 2023; 11:00	Report	Score by quarters: 5–1, 3–1, 4–0, 0–0			Villa Deportiva Nacional (Pool), Lima

29 August 2023; 12:00	Report	Colombia	15–5	Puerto Rico	Villa Deportiva Nacional (Pool), Lima
29 August 2023; 12:00	Report	Score by quarters: 4–2, 7–3, 3–0, 1–0			Villa Deportiva Nacional (Pool), Lima

29 August 2023; 13:00	Report	United States	16–6	Peru	Villa Deportiva Nacional (Pool), Lima
29 August 2023; 13:00	Report	Score by quarters: 5–3, 4–2, 4–1, 3–0			Villa Deportiva Nacional (Pool), Lima

29 August 2023; 17:00	Report	Venezuela	5–6	Chile	Villa Deportiva Nacional (Pool), Lima
29 August 2023; 17:00	Report	Score by quarters: 3–1, 1–3, 0–1, 1–1			Villa Deportiva Nacional (Pool), Lima

29 August 2023; 18:00	Report	United States	19–9	Puerto Rico	Villa Deportiva Nacional (Pool), Lima
29 August 2023; 18:00	Report	Score by quarters: 6–3, 6–4, 6–2, 1–0			Villa Deportiva Nacional (Pool), Lima

29 August 2023; 19:00	Report	Colombia	14–7	Mexico	Villa Deportiva Nacional (Pool), Lima
29 August 2023; 19:00	Report	Score by quarters: 2–1, 4–1, 4–3, 4–2			Villa Deportiva Nacional (Pool), Lima

29 August 2023; 20:00	Report	Bolivia	0–10	Peru	Villa Deportiva Nacional (Pool), Lima
29 August 2023; 20:00	Report	Score by quarters: 0–3, 0–5, 0–2, 0–0			Villa Deportiva Nacional (Pool), Lima

30 August 2023; 10:00	Report	United States	12–2	Mexico	Villa Deportiva Nacional (Pool), Lima
30 August 2023; 10:00	Report	Score by quarters: 5–1, 7–1, 0–0, 0–0			Villa Deportiva Nacional (Pool), Lima

30 August 2023; 11:00	Report	Bolivia	1–12	Chile	Villa Deportiva Nacional (Pool), Lima
30 August 2023; 11:00	Report	Score by quarters: 0–7, 1–5, 0–0, 0–0			Villa Deportiva Nacional (Pool), Lima

30 August 2023; 12:00	Report	Venezuela	4–14	Colombia	Villa Deportiva Nacional (Pool), Lima
30 August 2023; 12:00	Report	Score by quarters: 2–6, 1–4, 1–4, 0–0			Villa Deportiva Nacional (Pool), Lima

30 August 2023; 13:00	Report	Peru	17–7	Puerto Rico	Villa Deportiva Nacional (Pool), Lima
30 August 2023; 13:00	Report	Score by quarters: 4–2, 6–1, 3–3, 4–1			Villa Deportiva Nacional (Pool), Lima

30 August 2023; 17:00	Report	United States	12–1	Venezuela	Villa Deportiva Nacional (Pool), Lima
30 August 2023; 17:00	Report	Score by quarters: 5–0, 7–1, 0–0, 0–0			Villa Deportiva Nacional (Pool), Lima

30 August 2023; 18:00	Report	Bolivia	1–16	Colombia	Villa Deportiva Nacional (Pool), Lima
30 August 2023; 18:00	Report	Score by quarters: 0–8, 1–8, 0–0, 0–0			Villa Deportiva Nacional (Pool), Lima

30 August 2023; 19:00	Report	Puerto Rico	8–11	Mexico	Villa Deportiva Nacional (Pool), Lima
30 August 2023; 19:00	Report	Score by quarters: 2–1, 4–1, 1–5, 1–4			Villa Deportiva Nacional (Pool), Lima

30 August 2023; 20:00	Report	Peru	7–6	Chile	Villa Deportiva Nacional (Pool), Lima
30 August 2023; 20:00	Report	Score by quarters: 2–0, 2–1, 1–3, 2–2			Villa Deportiva Nacional (Pool), Lima

31 August 2023; 10:00	Report	United States	13–2	Bolivia	Villa Deportiva Nacional (Pool), Lima
31 August 2023; 10:00	Report	Score by quarters: 6–0, 7–2, 0–0, 0–0			Villa Deportiva Nacional (Pool), Lima

31 August 2023; 11:00	Report	Venezuela	4–8	Puerto Rico	Villa Deportiva Nacional (Pool), Lima
31 August 2023; 11:00	Report	Score by quarters: 0–1, 1–2, 3–2, 0–3			Villa Deportiva Nacional (Pool), Lima

31 August 2023; 12:00	Report	Colombia	13–10	Chile	Villa Deportiva Nacional (Pool), Lima
31 August 2023; 12:00	Report	Score by quarters: 3–2, 4–1, 3–3, 3–4			Villa Deportiva Nacional (Pool), Lima

31 August 2023; 13:00	Report	Mexico	10–11	Peru	Villa Deportiva Nacional (Pool), Lima
31 August 2023; 13:00	Report	Score by quarters: 4–2, 1–3, 4–3, 1–3			Villa Deportiva Nacional (Pool), Lima

== Second round ==
=== Platinum Series ===
Pos	Team	Pld	W	PSW	PSL	L	GF	GA	GD	Pts	Qualification
1	United States	3	3	0	0	0	44	18	+26	9	Semifinals
2	Colombia	3	2	0	0	1	34	30	+4	6	Semifinals
3	Mexico	3	1	0	0	2	17	31	−14	3	Semifinals
4	Peru	3	0	0	0	3	21	37	−16	0	Semifinals

Source: lima2023.panamaquaticsevents.com

31 August 2023; 19:00	Report	United States	16–6	Peru	Villa Deportiva Nacional (Pool), Lima
31 August 2023; 19:00	Report	Score by quarters: 3–1, 6–2, 4–2, 3–1			Villa Deportiva Nacional (Pool), Lima

31 August 2023; 20:00	Report	Colombia	12–6	Mexico	Villa Deportiva Nacional (Pool), Lima
31 August 2023; 20:00	Report	Score by quarters: 4–1, 1–2, 4–3, 3–0			Villa Deportiva Nacional (Pool), Lima

1 September 2023; 12:00	Report	Mexico	8–6	Peru	Villa Deportiva Nacional (Pool), Lima
1 September 2023; 12:00	Report	Score by quarters: 1–1, 3–3, 3–1, 1–1			Villa Deportiva Nacional (Pool), Lima

1 September 2023; 13:00	Report	United States	15–9	Colombia	Villa Deportiva Nacional (Pool), Lima
1 September 2023; 13:00	Report	Score by quarters: 2–0, 1–2, 7–2, 5–5			Villa Deportiva Nacional (Pool), Lima

1 September 2023; 19:00	Report	United States	13–3	Mexico	Villa Deportiva Nacional (Pool), Lima
1 September 2023; 19:00	Report	Score by quarters: 5–2, 4–0, 4–1, 0–0			Villa Deportiva Nacional (Pool), Lima

1 September 2023; 20:00	Report	Colombia	13–9	Peru	Villa Deportiva Nacional (Pool), Lima
1 September 2023; 20:00	Report	Score by quarters: 2–3, 2–2, 4–2, 5–2			Villa Deportiva Nacional (Pool), Lima

=== Gold Series ===
Pos	Team	Pld	W	PSW	PSL	L	GF	GA	GD	Pts	Qualification
5	Chile	3	3	0	0	0	25	7	+18	9	5th–8th place playoffs
6	Puerto Rico	3	2	0	0	1	25	21	+4	6	5th–8th place playoffs
7	Venezuela	3	1	0	0	2	27	23	+4	3	5th–8th place playoffs
8	Bolivia	3	0	0	0	3	8	34	−26	0	5th–8th place playoffs

Source: lima2023.panamaquaticsevents.com

31 August 2023; 17:00	Report	Puerto Rico	11–10	Venezuela	Villa Deportiva Nacional (Pool), Lima
31 August 2023; 17:00	Report	Score by quarters: 4–0, 5–4, 0–3, 2–3			Villa Deportiva Nacional (Pool), Lima

31 August 2023; 18:00	Report	Chile	10–0	Bolivia	Villa Deportiva Nacional (Pool), Lima
31 August 2023; 18:00	Report	Score by quarters: 4–0, 6–0, 0–0, 0–0			Villa Deportiva Nacional (Pool), Lima

1 September 2023; 10:00	Report	Bolivia	5–13	Venezuela	Villa Deportiva Nacional (Pool), Lima
1 September 2023; 10:00	Report	Score by quarters: 0–3, 1–2, 2–5, 2–3			Villa Deportiva Nacional (Pool), Lima

1 September 2023; 11:00	Report	Puerto Rico	3–8	Chile	Villa Deportiva Nacional (Pool), Lima
1 September 2023; 11:00	Report	Score by quarters: 0–0, 1–3, 2–1, 0–4			Villa Deportiva Nacional (Pool), Lima

1 September 2023; 17:00	Report	Puerto Rico	11–3	Bolivia	Villa Deportiva Nacional (Pool), Lima
1 September 2023; 17:00	Report	Score by quarters: 3–0, 4–0, 2–0, 2–3			Villa Deportiva Nacional (Pool), Lima

1 September 2023; 18:00	Report	Chile	7–4	Venezuela	Villa Deportiva Nacional (Pool), Lima
1 September 2023; 18:00	Report	Score by quarters: 0–0, 1–1, 3–1, 3–2			Villa Deportiva Nacional (Pool), Lima

== 5th–8th place playoffs ==
=== Bracket ===
5th–8th place semifinals
5	Chile	12
8	Bolivia	2
6	Puerto Rico	13
7	Venezuela	12

5th place match
Chile	14
Puerto Rico	4
7th place match
Bolivia	5
Venezuela	14

=== 5th–8th place semifinals ===
2 September 2023; 9:00	Report	Chile	12–2	Bolivia	Villa Deportiva Nacional (Pool), Lima
2 September 2023; 9:00	Report	Score by quarters: 8–0, 4–2, 0–0, 0–0			Villa Deportiva Nacional (Pool), Lima

2 September 2023; 10:00	Report	Puerto Rico	13–12	Venezuela	Villa Deportiva Nacional (Pool), Lima
2 September 2023; 10:00	Report	Score by quarters: 3–4, 5–1, 3–5, 2–2			Villa Deportiva Nacional (Pool), Lima

==== 7th place match ====
2 September 2023; 18:00	Report	Bolivia	5–14	Venezuela	Villa Deportiva Nacional (Pool), Lima
2 September 2023; 18:00	Report	Score by quarters: 1–2, 1–2, 3–1, 0–9			Villa Deportiva Nacional (Pool), Lima

==== 5th place match ====
2 September 2023; 19:00	Report	Chile	14–4	Puerto Rico	Villa Deportiva Nacional (Pool), Lima
2 September 2023; 19:00	Report	Score by quarters: 2–1, 4–1, 4–1, 4–1			Villa Deportiva Nacional (Pool), Lima

== Championship playoffs ==
=== Bracket ===
Semifinals
1	United States	11
4	Peru	1
2	Colombia	14
3	Mexico	13

Final
United States	16
Colombia	6
3rd place match
Peru	14(3)
Mexico	14(2)

=== Semifinals ===
2 September 2023; 11:00	Report	United States	11–1	Peru	Villa Deportiva Nacional (Pool), Lima
2 September 2023; 11:00	Report	Score by quarters: 6–1, 5–0, 0–0, 0–0			Villa Deportiva Nacional (Pool), Lima

2 September 2023; 12:30	Report	Colombia	14–13	Mexico	Villa Deportiva Nacional (Pool), Lima
2 September 2023; 12:30	Report	Score by quarters: 4–2, 5–3, 4–2, 1–6			Villa Deportiva Nacional (Pool), Lima

==== 3rd place match ====
3 September 2023; 9:50	Report	Peru	14–14; PSO: 3–2	Mexico	Villa Deportiva Nacional (Pool), Lima
3 September 2023; 9:50	Report	Score by quarters: 2–4, 5–5, 2–2, 5–3			Villa Deportiva Nacional (Pool), Lima

==== Final ====
3 September 2023; 11:10	Report	United States	16–6	Colombia	Villa Deportiva Nacional (Pool), Lima
3 September 2023; 11:10	Report	Score by quarters: 6–2, 3–2, 3–2, 4–0			Villa Deportiva Nacional (Pool), Lima

== Final standings ==
Rank	Team
1st place, gold medalist(s)	United States
2nd place, silver medalist(s)	Colombia
3rd place, bronze medalist(s)	Peru
4	Mexico
5	Chile
6	Puerto Rico
7	Venezuela
8	Bolivia
