= 2025 Pan American U17 Water Polo Championship – Women's tournament =

Tournament details
- Host country: Colombia
- City: Medellín
- Venue: 1 (in 1 host city)
- Dates: 19–25 May
- Teams: 7 (from 1 confederation)

Final positions
- Champions: United States (5th title)
- Runners-up: Canada
- Third place: Brazil
- Fourth place: Colombia

Official website
- medellin2025

The 2025 Pan American U17 Water Polo Championship – Women's tournament was the 7th edition of the Pan American under-17 women's water polo championship and a part of the 2025 Pan American Aquatics Championships, organized by the PanAm Aquatics. The event was held in Medellín, Colombia, from 19 to 25 May 2025.

Players born in 2008 or later were eligible to participate.

== Format ==
Seven teams entered the championship. In the first round, all teams played round-robin in one common group. The top two teams advanced to the final; the 3rd–4th teams advanced to the third place match; the 5rd–6th teams advanced to the fifth place match. The bottom team finished seventh overall.

All times are local (Colombia time; UTC-5).

== Group stage ==
=== Standings ===
Pos	Team	Pld	W	PSW	PSL	L	GF	GA	GD	Pts	Qualification
1	United States	6	6	0	0	0	144	33	+111	18	Final
2	Canada	6	5	0	0	1	126	52	+74	15	Final
3	Brazil	6	4	0	0	2	91	59	+32	12	Third place match
4	Colombia (H)	6	3	0	0	3	86	111	−25	9	Third place match
5	Argentina	6	2	0	0	4	79	101	−22	6	Fifth place match
6	Mexico	6	1	0	0	5	55	141	−86	3	Fifth place match
7	Peru	6	0	0	0	6	27	111	−84	0	

Source: medellin2025.panamaquaticsevents.com
(H) Host

=== Match results ===
19 May 2025; 09:00	Report	Canada	28–4	Mexico	César Zapata Aquatic Complex (Olympic pool), Medellín
19 May 2025; 09:00	Report	Score by quarters: 9–1, 7–2, 4–1, 8–0			César Zapata Aquatic Complex (Olympic pool), Medellín

19 May 2025; 11:40	Report	United States	20–7	Brazil	César Zapata Aquatic Complex (Olympic pool), Medellín
19 May 2025; 11:40	Report	Score by quarters: 6–4, 5–1, 5–1, 4–1			César Zapata Aquatic Complex (Olympic pool), Medellín

19 May 2025; 18:30	Report	Colombia	16–8	Peru	César Zapata Aquatic Complex (Olympic pool), Medellín
19 May 2025; 18:30	Report	Score by quarters: 5–1, 1–3, 5–2, 5–2			César Zapata Aquatic Complex (Olympic pool), Medellín

20 May 2025; 15:00	Report	Mexico	3–28	United States	César Zapata Aquatic Complex (Olympic pool), Medellín
20 May 2025; 15:00	Report	Score by quarters: 0–7, 0–6, 2–8, 1–7			César Zapata Aquatic Complex (Olympic pool), Medellín

20 May 2025; 16:20	Report	Brazil	9–15	Canada	César Zapata Aquatic Complex (Olympic pool), Medellín
20 May 2025; 16:20	Report	Score by quarters: 3–5, 1–3, 3–5, 2–2			César Zapata Aquatic Complex (Olympic pool), Medellín

20 May 2025; 20:20	Report	Colombia	20–14	Argentina	César Zapata Aquatic Complex (Olympic pool), Medellín
20 May 2025; 20:20	Report	Score by quarters: 6–1, 7–3, 2–4, 5–6			César Zapata Aquatic Complex (Olympic pool), Medellín

21 May 2025; 08:00	Report	Peru	1–22	United States	César Zapata Aquatic Complex (Olympic pool), Medellín
21 May 2025; 08:00	Report	Score by quarters: 0–8, 0–6, 1–4, 0–4			César Zapata Aquatic Complex (Olympic pool), Medellín

21 May 2025; 10:40	Report	Argentina	9–21	Canada	César Zapata Aquatic Complex (Olympic pool), Medellín
21 May 2025; 10:40	Report	Score by quarters: 2–6, 3–7, 2–4, 2–4			César Zapata Aquatic Complex (Olympic pool), Medellín

21 May 2025; 13:20	Report	Brazil	24–8	Mexico	César Zapata Aquatic Complex (Olympic pool), Medellín
21 May 2025; 13:20	Report	Score by quarters: 7–3, 5–2, 5–3, 7–0			César Zapata Aquatic Complex (Olympic pool), Medellín

21 May 2025; 16:00	Report	Canada	10–16	United States	César Zapata Aquatic Complex (Olympic pool), Medellín
21 May 2025; 16:00	Report	Score by quarters: 3–5, 2–6, 2–3, 3–2			César Zapata Aquatic Complex (Olympic pool), Medellín

21 May 2025; 18:40	Report	Peru	2–19	Argentina	César Zapata Aquatic Complex (Olympic pool), Medellín
21 May 2025; 18:40	Report	Score by quarters: 0–6, 0–3, 1–4, 1–6			César Zapata Aquatic Complex (Olympic pool), Medellín

21 May 2025; 21:20	Report	Colombia	5–17	Brazil	César Zapata Aquatic Complex (Olympic pool), Medellín
21 May 2025; 21:20	Report	Score by quarters: 3–5, 2–4, 0–4, 0–4			César Zapata Aquatic Complex (Olympic pool), Medellín

22 May 2025; 08:00	Report	Argentina	25–12	Mexico	César Zapata Aquatic Complex (Olympic pool), Medellín
22 May 2025; 08:00	Report	Score by quarters: 4–2, 7–3, 5–4, 9–3			César Zapata Aquatic Complex (Olympic pool), Medellín

22 May 2025; 09:20	Report	Brazil	17–3	Peru	César Zapata Aquatic Complex (Olympic pool), Medellín
22 May 2025; 09:20	Report	Score by quarters: 4–1, 2–0, 5–0, 6–2			César Zapata Aquatic Complex (Olympic pool), Medellín

22 May 2025; 18:40	Report	Colombia	13–28	Canada	César Zapata Aquatic Complex (Olympic pool), Medellín
22 May 2025; 18:40	Report	Score by quarters: 3–8, 3–6, 3–8, 4–6			César Zapata Aquatic Complex (Olympic pool), Medellín

23 May 2025; 09:00	Report	United States	29–4	Argentina	César Zapata Aquatic Complex (Olympic pool), Medellín
23 May 2025; 09:00	Report	Score by quarters: 4–1, 11–1, 8–0, 6–2			César Zapata Aquatic Complex (Olympic pool), Medellín

23 May 2025; 10:30	Report	Peru	1–24	Canada	César Zapata Aquatic Complex (Olympic pool), Medellín
23 May 2025; 10:30	Report	Score by quarters: 0–5, 1–6, 0–6, 0–7			César Zapata Aquatic Complex (Olympic pool), Medellín

23 May 2025; 12:00	Report	Colombia	24–15	Mexico	César Zapata Aquatic Complex (Olympic pool), Medellín
23 May 2025; 12:00	Report	Score by quarters: 5–2, 7–3, 9–4, 3–6			César Zapata Aquatic Complex (Olympic pool), Medellín

24 May 2025; 09:00	Report	Argentina	8–17	Brazil	César Zapata Aquatic Complex (Olympic pool), Medellín
24 May 2025; 09:00	Report	Score by quarters: 1–5, 1–2, 3–7, 3–3			César Zapata Aquatic Complex (Olympic pool), Medellín

24 May 2025; 10:30	Report	Mexico	13–12	Peru	César Zapata Aquatic Complex (Olympic pool), Medellín
24 May 2025; 10:30	Report	Score by quarters: 1–0, 3–3, 5–3, 4–6			César Zapata Aquatic Complex (Olympic pool), Medellín

24 May 2025; 12:00	Report	Colombia	8–29	United States	César Zapata Aquatic Complex (Olympic pool), Medellín
24 May 2025; 12:00	Report	Score by quarters: 1–7, 4–9, 2–8, 1–5			César Zapata Aquatic Complex (Olympic pool), Medellín

== Playoffs ==
=== Fifth place match ===
25 May 2025; 10:30	Report	Argentina	24–11	Mexico	César Zapata Aquatic Complex (Olympic pool), Medellín
25 May 2025; 10:30	Report	Score by quarters: 5–2, 4–3, 4–3, 11–3			César Zapata Aquatic Complex (Olympic pool), Medellín

=== Third place match ===
25 May 2025; 13:30	Report	Brazil	17–7	Colombia	César Zapata Aquatic Complex (Olympic pool), Medellín
25 May 2025; 13:30	Report	Score by quarters: 5–1, 5–3, 4–1, 3–2			César Zapata Aquatic Complex (Olympic pool), Medellín

=== Final ===
25 May 2025; 16:30	Report	United States	18–7	Canada	César Zapata Aquatic Complex (Olympic pool), Medellín
25 May 2025; 16:30	Report	Score by quarters: 3–1, 6–3, 6–1, 3–2			César Zapata Aquatic Complex (Olympic pool), Medellín

== Final standings ==
Rank	Team
1st place, gold medalist(s)	United States
2nd place, silver medalist(s)	Canada
3rd place, bronze medalist(s)	Brazil
4	Colombia
5	Argentina
6	Mexico
7	Peru
