= 2024 World Aquatics Women's U16 Water Polo Championships =

International youth women's water polo tournament

Tournament details
- Host country: Turkey
- City: Manisa
- Venue: 1 (in 1 host city)
- Dates: 28 June – 4 July 2024
- Teams: 22 (from 5 confederations)

Final positions
- Champions: Spain (1st title)
- Runners-up: Hungary
- Third place: Australia
- Fourth place: Croatia

Official website
- www.worldaquatics.com

The 2024 World Aquatics Women's U16 Water Polo Championships was the second edition of the women's U16 Water Polo World Championship. The tournament was played in Manisa, Malta, from 28 June to 4 July 2024. Hungary were the defending champions. Spain won their first title after beating Hungary in the final, 10–7.

== Hosts selection ==
On 7 December 2023, Turkey was given the hosting rights.

== Participating teams ==
Africa

- South Africa
- Zimbabwe

Americas

- Canada
- United States

Asia

- China
- Kazakhstan
- Thailand

Europe

- Croatia
- Czech Republic
- France
- Germany
- Greece
- Hungary
- Italy
- Malta
- Netherlands
- Serbia
- Spain
- Turkey (hosts)
- Ukraine

Oceania

- Australia
- New Zealand

== Format ==
The tournament consisted of two phases:

Group stage

The 22 teams were drawn into eight groups of three or two. Groups were played in a round-robin format (two-team groups in a double-round-robin format), with all teams playing two matches. The top two teams from each group qualified for the Last 16. The third teams from three-team groups were dropped to the 17th–22nd place classification.

Knockout stage

All teams played three or four more matches in the knockout stage, which was played as a series of playoffs, consolation playoffs and final classification matches.

All times are local (Turkey Time; UTC+3).

== Group stage ==
=== Group A ===
| Pos | Team | Pld | W | PSW | PSL | L | GF | GA | GD | Pts | Qualification |
|---|---|---|---|---|---|---|---|---|---|---|---|
| 1 | Netherlands | 2 | 2 | 0 | 0 | 0 | 21 | 10 | +11 | 6 | Last 16 |
| 2 | Thailand | 2 | 0 | 0 | 0 | 2 | 10 | 21 | −11 | 0 | Last 16 |

Source: World Aquatics

| 28 June 2024; 9:00 | Report | Thailand | 7–11 | Netherlands | Aquatic Centre, Manisa |
| 28 June 2024; 9:00 | Report | Score by quarters: 2–2, 2–4, 0–3, 3–2 | | | Aquatic Centre, Manisa |

| 30 June 2024; 12:45 | Report | Netherlands | 10–3 | Thailand | Aquatic Centre, Manisa |
| 30 June 2024; 12:45 | Report | Score by quarters: 3–1, 1–2, 4–0, 2–0 | | | Aquatic Centre, Manisa |

=== Group B ===
| Pos | Team | Pld | W | PSW | PSL | L | GF | GA | GD | Pts | Qualification |
|---|---|---|---|---|---|---|---|---|---|---|---|
| 1 | Greece | 2 | 2 | 0 | 0 | 0 | 43 | 6 | +37 | 6 | Last 16 |
| 2 | Canada | 2 | 1 | 0 | 0 | 1 | 16 | 22 | −6 | 3 | Last 16 |
| 3 | Zimbabwe | 2 | 0 | 0 | 0 | 2 | 3 | 34 | −31 | 0 | 17th–22nd place playoffs |

Source: World Aquatics

| 28 June 2024; 10:15 | Report | Zimbabwe | 0–13 | Canada | Aquatic Centre, Manisa |
| 28 June 2024; 10:15 | Report | Score by quarters: 0–1, 0–6, 0–3, 0–3 | | | Aquatic Centre, Manisa |

| 29 June 2024; 12:45 | Report | Canada | 3–22 | Greece | Aquatic Centre, Manisa |
| 29 June 2024; 12:45 | Report | Score by quarters: 0–6, 0–5, 2–4, 1–7 | | | Aquatic Centre, Manisa |

| 30 June 2024; 11:30 | Report | Zimbabwe | 3–21 | Greece | Aquatic Centre, Manisa |
| 30 June 2024; 11:30 | Report | Score by quarters: 2–6, 0–3, 1–7, 0–5 | | | Aquatic Centre, Manisa |

=== Group C ===
| Pos | Team | Pld | W | PSW | PSL | L | GF | GA | GD | Pts | Qualification |
|---|---|---|---|---|---|---|---|---|---|---|---|
| 1 | Croatia | 2 | 2 | 0 | 0 | 0 | 26 | 18 | +8 | 6 | Last 16 |
| 2 | Germany | 2 | 1 | 0 | 0 | 1 | 19 | 15 | +4 | 3 | Last 16 |
| 3 | France | 2 | 0 | 0 | 0 | 2 | 16 | 28 | −12 | 0 | 17th–22nd place playoffs |

Source: World Aquatics

| 28 June 2024; 11:30 | Report | Germany | 8–9 | Croatia | Aquatic Centre, Manisa |
| 28 June 2024; 11:30 | Report | Score by quarters: 1–1, 2–3, 2–2, 3–3 | | | Aquatic Centre, Manisa |

| 29 June 2024; 10:15 | Report | Croatia | 17–10 | France | Aquatic Centre, Manisa |
| 29 June 2024; 10:15 | Report | Score by quarters: 1–2, 3–3, 6–3, 7–2 | | | Aquatic Centre, Manisa |

| 30 June 2024; 10:15 | Report | Germany | 11–6 | France | Aquatic Centre, Manisa |
| 30 June 2024; 10:15 | Report | Score by quarters: 2–1, 2–1, 5–2, 2–2 | | | Aquatic Centre, Manisa |

=== Group D ===
| Pos | Team | Pld | W | PSW | PSL | L | GF | GA | GD | Pts | Qualification |
|---|---|---|---|---|---|---|---|---|---|---|---|
| 1 | Hungary | 2 | 2 | 0 | 0 | 0 | 32 | 9 | +23 | 6 | Last 16 |
| 2 | South Africa | 2 | 1 | 0 | 0 | 1 | 12 | 25 | −13 | 3 | Last 16 |
| 3 | Kazakhstan | 2 | 0 | 0 | 0 | 2 | 12 | 22 | −10 | 0 | 17th–22nd place playoffs |

Source: World Aquatics

| 28 June 2024; 12:45 | Report | Kazakhstan | 7–8 | South Africa | Aquatic Centre, Manisa |
| 28 June 2024; 12:45 | Report | Score by quarters: 4–2, 1–2, 0–2, 2–2 | | | Aquatic Centre, Manisa |

| 29 June 2024; 11:30 | Report | South Africa | 4–18 | Hungary | Aquatic Centre, Manisa |
| 29 June 2024; 11:30 | Report | Score by quarters: 2–4, 1–4, 0–3, 1–7 | | | Aquatic Centre, Manisa |

| 30 June 2024; 9:00 | Report | Kazakhstan | 5–14 | Hungary | Aquatic Centre, Manisa |
| 30 June 2024; 9:00 | Report | Score by quarters: 0–2, 3–3, 1–5, 1–4 | | | Aquatic Centre, Manisa |

=== Group E ===
| Pos | Team | Pld | W | PSW | PSL | L | GF | GA | GD | Pts | Qualification |
|---|---|---|---|---|---|---|---|---|---|---|---|
| 1 | United States | 2 | 2 | 0 | 0 | 0 | 35 | 6 | +29 | 6 | Last 16 |
| 2 | Serbia | 2 | 1 | 0 | 0 | 1 | 14 | 32 | −18 | 3 | Last 16 |
| 3 | New Zealand | 2 | 0 | 0 | 0 | 2 | 13 | 24 | −11 | 0 | 17th–22nd place playoffs |

Source: World Aquatics

| 28 June 2024; 16:15 | Report | United States | 13–3 | New Zealand | Aquatic Centre, Manisa |
| 28 June 2024; 16:15 | Report | Score by quarters: 2–1, 2–2, 5–0, 4–0 | | | Aquatic Centre, Manisa |

| 29 June 2024; 18:45 | Report | New Zealand | 10–11 | Serbia | Aquatic Centre, Manisa |
| 29 June 2024; 18:45 | Report | Score by quarters: 2–4, 1–2, 3–3, 4–2 | | | Aquatic Centre, Manisa |

| 30 June 2024; 18:45 | Report | United States | 22–3 | Serbia | Aquatic Centre, Manisa |
| 30 June 2024; 18:45 | Report | Score by quarters: 4–3, 6–0, 7–0, 5–0 | | | Aquatic Centre, Manisa |

=== Group F ===
| Pos | Team | Pld | W | PSW | PSL | L | GF | GA | GD | Pts | Qualification |
|---|---|---|---|---|---|---|---|---|---|---|---|
| 1 | Australia | 2 | 2 | 0 | 0 | 0 | 24 | 5 | +19 | 6 | Last 16 |
| 2 | Turkey (H) | 2 | 0 | 0 | 0 | 2 | 5 | 24 | −19 | 0 | Last 16 |

Source: World Aquatics
(H) Host

| 28 June 2024; 20:00 | Report | Turkey | 2–11 | Australia | Aquatic Centre, Manisa |
| 28 June 2024; 20:00 | Report | Score by quarters: 0–1, 0–3, 1–3, 1–4 | | | Aquatic Centre, Manisa |

| 30 June 2024; 20:00 | Report | Australia | 13–3 | Turkey | Aquatic Centre, Manisa |
| 30 June 2024; 20:00 | Report | Score by quarters: 3–0, 3–1, 4–0, 3–2 | | | Aquatic Centre, Manisa |

=== Group G ===
| Pos | Team | Pld | W | PSW | PSL | L | GF | GA | GD | Pts | Qualification |
|---|---|---|---|---|---|---|---|---|---|---|---|
| 1 | Spain | 2 | 2 | 0 | 0 | 0 | 41 | 6 | +35 | 6 | Last 16 |
| 2 | Ukraine | 2 | 1 | 0 | 0 | 1 | 14 | 29 | −15 | 3 | Last 16 |
| 3 | Malta | 2 | 0 | 0 | 0 | 2 | 11 | 31 | −20 | 0 | 17th–22nd place playoffs |

Source: World Aquatics

| 28 June 2024; 18:45 | Report | Ukraine | 2–22 | Spain | Aquatic Centre, Manisa |
| 28 June 2024; 18:45 | Report | Score by quarters: 1–7, 0–6, 1–3, 0–6 | | | Aquatic Centre, Manisa |

| 29 June 2024; 16:15 | Report | Spain | 19–4 | Malta | Aquatic Centre, Manisa |
| 29 June 2024; 16:15 | Report | Score by quarters: 4–0, 6–0, 5–3, 4–1 | | | Aquatic Centre, Manisa |

| 30 June 2024; 17:30 | Report | Ukraine | 12–7 | Malta | Aquatic Centre, Manisa |
| 30 June 2024; 17:30 | Report | Score by quarters: 1–2, 3–2, 4–2, 4–1 | | | Aquatic Centre, Manisa |

=== Group H ===
| Pos | Team | Pld | W | PSW | PSL | L | GF | GA | GD | Pts | Qualification |
|---|---|---|---|---|---|---|---|---|---|---|---|
| 1 | Italy | 2 | 2 | 0 | 0 | 0 | 35 | 12 | +23 | 6 | Last 16 |
| 2 | China | 2 | 1 | 0 | 0 | 1 | 23 | 14 | +9 | 3 | Last 16 |
| 3 | Czech Republic | 2 | 0 | 0 | 0 | 2 | 9 | 41 | −32 | 0 | 17th–22nd place playoffs |

Source: World Aquatics

| 28 June 2024; 17:30 | Report | China | 15–5 | Czech Republic | Aquatic Centre, Manisa |
| 28 June 2024; 17:30 | Report | Score by quarters: 3–1, 3–1, 4–2, 5–1 | | | Aquatic Centre, Manisa |

| 29 June 2024; 17:30 | Report | Czech Republic | 4–26 | Italy | Aquatic Centre, Manisa |
| 29 June 2024; 17:30 | Report | Score by quarters: 1–6, 2–9, 1–5, 0–6 | | | Aquatic Centre, Manisa |

| 30 June 2024; 16:15 | Report | China | 8–9 | Italy | Aquatic Centre, Manisa |
| 30 June 2024; 16:15 | Report | Score by quarters: 3–1, 1–3, 2–2, 2–3 | | | Aquatic Centre, Manisa |

== 17th–22nd place playoffs ==
=== Brackets ===
==== 17th place bracket ====
17th–22nd place quarterfinals
1 July
Zimbabwe | 4
France | 11
1 July
New Zealand | 6
Czech Republic | 7

17th–20th place semifinals
2 July
Kazakhstan | 13
France | 10
2 July
Czech Republic | 14
Malta | 8

17th place match
4 July
Kazakhstan | 13
Czech Republic | 7
19th place match
3 July
France | 11
Malta | 9

==== 21st place bracket ====
| 21st place series |
| 3 & 4 July |
| Zimbabwe | 2 | 2 | 4 |
| New Zealand | 11 | 12 | 23 |

=== 17th–22nd place quarterfinals ===
| 1 July 2024; 14:00 | Report | Zimbabwe | 4–11 | France | Aquatic Centre, Manisa |
| 1 July 2024; 14:00 | Report | Score by quarters: 0–1, 0–2, 2–3, 2–5 | | | Aquatic Centre, Manisa |

| 1 July 2024; 15:15 | Report | New Zealand | 6–7 | Czech Republic | Aquatic Centre, Manisa |
| 1 July 2024; 15:15 | Report | Score by quarters: 3–0, 1–2, 0–3, 2–2 | | | Aquatic Centre, Manisa |

==== 21st place series ====
| 3 July 2024; 14:00 | Report | Zimbabwe | 2–11 | New Zealand | Aquatic Centre, Manisa |
| 3 July 2024; 14:00 | Report | Score by quarters: 0–4, 0–1, 2–2, 0–4 | | | Aquatic Centre, Manisa |

| 4 July 2024; 8:00 | Report | New Zealand | 12–2 | Zimbabwe | Aquatic Centre, Manisa |
| 4 July 2024; 8:00 | Report | Score by quarters: 2–1, 4–0, 4–0, 2–1 | | | Aquatic Centre, Manisa |

=== 17th–20th place semifinals ===
| 2 July 2024; 14:00 | Report | Kazakhstan | 13–10 | France | Aquatic Centre, Manisa |
| 2 July 2024; 14:00 | Report | Score by quarters: 5–1, 2–2, 2–3, 4–4 | | | Aquatic Centre, Manisa |

| 2 July 2024; 15:15 | Report | Czech Republic | 14–8 | Malta | Aquatic Centre, Manisa |
| 2 July 2024; 15:15 | Report | Score by quarters: 1–2, 4–0, 4–3, 5–3 | | | Aquatic Centre, Manisa |

==== 19th place match ====
| 3 July 2024; 15:15 | Report | France | 11–9 | Malta | Aquatic Centre, Manisa |
| 3 July 2024; 15:15 | Report | Score by quarters: 4–2, 2–2, 3–3, 2–2 | | | Aquatic Centre, Manisa |

==== 17th place match ====
| 4 July 2024; 14:15 | Report | Kazakhstan | 13–7 | Czech Republic | Aquatic Centre, Manisa |
| 4 July 2024; 14:15 | Report | Score by quarters: 5–1, 2–2, 3–2, 3–2 | | | Aquatic Centre, Manisa |

== Championship playoffs ==
=== Brackets ===
==== Main bracket ====
Crossovers
1 July
Netherlands | 13
South Africa | 3
1 July
Canada | 7
Croatia | 11
1 July
Germany | 3
Greece | 16
1 July
Thailand | 5
Hungary | 16
1 July
United States | 14
China | 3
1 July
Turkey | 3
Spain | 14
1 July
Australia | 16
Ukraine | 0
1 July
Serbia | 7
Italy | 18

Quarterfinals
2 July
Netherlands | 6
Croatia | 8
2 July
Greece | 12 (2)
Hungary (PSO) | 12 (4)
2 July
United States | 10
Spain | 16
2 July
Australia | 13
Italy | 8

Semifinals
3 July
Croatia | 13
Hungary | 18
3 July
Spain | 14
Australia | 7

Final
4 July
Hungary | 7
Spain | 10
3rd place match
4 July
Croatia | 10
Australia | 13

==== 5th place bracket ====
5th–8th place semifinals
3 July
Netherlands | 7
Greece | 14
3 July
United States | 11 (1)
Italy (PSO) | 11 (3)

5th place match
4 July
Greece | 15
Italy | 9
7th place match
4 July
Netherlands | 10
United States | 11

==== 9th place bracket ====
9th–16th place quarterfinals
2 July
South Africa | 6
Canada | 8
2 July
Germany | 7
Thailand | 4
2 July
China | 8
Turkey | 1
2 July
Ukraine | 5
Serbia | 8

9th–12th place semifinals
3 July
Canada | 5
Germany | 7
3 July
China | 7
Serbia | 2

9th place match
4 July
Germany | 5
China | 7
11th place match
4 July
Canada | 12
Serbia | 11

==== 13th place bracket ====
13th–16th place semifinals
3 July
South Africa | 4
Thailand | 14
3 July
Turkey | 14
Ukraine | 2

13th place match
4 July
Thailand | 9
Turkey | 10
15th place match
4 July
South Africa | 13
Ukraine | 4

=== Crossovers ===
| 1 July 2024; 9:00 | Report | Netherlands | 13–3 | South Africa | Aquatic Centre, Manisa |
| 1 July 2024; 9:00 | Report | Score by quarters: 3–1, 3–2, 5–0, 2–0 | | | Aquatic Centre, Manisa |

| 1 July 2024; 10:15 | Report | Canada | 7–11 | Croatia | Aquatic Centre, Manisa |
| 1 July 2024; 10:15 | Report | Score by quarters: 1–2, 2–5, 1–2, 3–2 | | | Aquatic Centre, Manisa |

| 1 July 2024; 11:30 | Report | Germany | 3–16 | Greece | Aquatic Centre, Manisa |
| 1 July 2024; 11:30 | Report | Score by quarters: 1–3, 0–3, 0–7, 2–3 | | | Aquatic Centre, Manisa |

| 1 July 2024; 12:45 | Report | Thailand | 5–16 | Hungary | Aquatic Centre, Manisa |
| 1 July 2024; 12:45 | Report | Score by quarters: 0–3, 2–5, 1–3, 2–5 | | | Aquatic Centre, Manisa |

| 1 July 2024; 16:30 | Report | United States | 14–3 | China | Aquatic Centre, Manisa |
| 1 July 2024; 16:30 | Report | Score by quarters: 4–2, 4–0, 3–1, 3–0 | | | Aquatic Centre, Manisa |

| 1 July 2024; 17:45 | Report | Turkey | 3–14 | Spain | Aquatic Centre, Manisa |
| 1 July 2024; 17:45 | Report | Score by quarters: 1–3, 2–3, 0–4, 0–4 | | | Aquatic Centre, Manisa |

| 1 July 2024; 19:00 | Report | Australia | 16–0 | Ukraine | Aquatic Centre, Manisa |
| 1 July 2024; 19:00 | Report | Score by quarters: 2–0, 3–0, 4–0, 7–0 | | | Aquatic Centre, Manisa |

| 1 July 2024; 20:15 | Report | Serbia | 7–18 | Italy | Aquatic Centre, Manisa |
| 1 July 2024; 20:15 | Report | Score by quarters: 1–2, 1–7, 3–2, 2–7 | | | Aquatic Centre, Manisa |

=== 9th–16th place quarterfinals ===
| 2 July 2024; 9:00 | Report | South Africa | 6–8 | Canada | Aquatic Centre, Manisa |
| 2 July 2024; 9:00 | Report | Score by quarters: 4–1, 0–5, 1–1, 1–1 | | | Aquatic Centre, Manisa |

| 2 July 2024; 10:15 | Report | Germany | 7–4 | Thailand | Aquatic Centre, Manisa |
| 2 July 2024; 10:15 | Report | Score by quarters: 1–1, 1–0, 3–1, 2–2 | | | Aquatic Centre, Manisa |

| 2 July 2024; 11:30 | Report | China | 8–1 | Turkey | Aquatic Centre, Manisa |
| 2 July 2024; 11:30 | Report | Score by quarters: 3–0, 2–1, 1–0, 2–0 | | | Aquatic Centre, Manisa |

| 2 July 2024; 12:45 | Report | Ukraine | 5–8 | Serbia | Aquatic Centre, Manisa |
| 2 July 2024; 12:45 | Report | Score by quarters: 0–2, 3–3, 2–2, 0–1 | | | Aquatic Centre, Manisa |

=== 13th–16th place semifinals ===
| 3 July 2024; 9:00 | Report | South Africa | 4–14 | Thailand | Aquatic Centre, Manisa |
| 3 July 2024; 9:00 | Report | Score by quarters: 0–4, 1–4, 1–3, 2–3 | | | Aquatic Centre, Manisa |

| 3 July 2024; 10:15 | Report | Turkey | 14–2 | Ukraine | Aquatic Centre, Manisa |
| 3 July 2024; 10:15 | Report | Score by quarters: 3–0, 4–1, 4–1, 3–0 | | | Aquatic Centre, Manisa |

==== 15th place match ====
| 4 July 2024; 9:15 | Report | South Africa | 13–4 | Ukraine | Aquatic Centre, Manisa |
| 4 July 2024; 9:15 | Report | Score by quarters: 2–1, 3–1, 4–1, 4–1 | | | Aquatic Centre, Manisa |

==== 13th place match ====
| 4 July 2024; 10:30 | Report | Thailand | 9–10 | Turkey | Aquatic Centre, Manisa |
| 4 July 2024; 10:30 | Report | Score by quarters: 2–3, 3–5, 3–1, 1–1 | | | Aquatic Centre, Manisa |

=== 9th–12th place semifinals ===
| 3 July 2024; 11:30 | Report | Canada | 5–7 | Germany | Aquatic Centre, Manisa |
| 3 July 2024; 11:30 | Report | Score by quarters: 1–3, 2–2, 0–1, 2–1 | | | Aquatic Centre, Manisa |

| 3 July 2024; 12:45 | Report | China | 7–2 | Serbia | Aquatic Centre, Manisa |
| 3 July 2024; 12:45 | Report | Score by quarters: 3–1, 1–0, 1–1, 2–0 | | | Aquatic Centre, Manisa |

==== 11th place match ====
| 4 July 2024; 11:45 | Report | Canada | 12–11 | Serbia | Aquatic Centre, Manisa |
| 4 July 2024; 11:45 | Report | Score by quarters: 3–3, 4–3, 4–3, 1–2 | | | Aquatic Centre, Manisa |

==== 9th place match ====
| 4 July 2024; 13:00 | Report | Germany | 5–7 | China | Aquatic Centre, Manisa |
| 4 July 2024; 13:00 | Report | Score by quarters: 1–2, 1–3, 3–1, 0–1 | | | Aquatic Centre, Manisa |

=== Quarterfinals ===
| 2 July 2024; 16:30 | Report | Netherlands | 6–8 | Croatia | Aquatic Centre, Manisa |
| 2 July 2024; 16:30 | Report | Score by quarters: 1–3, 1–1, 2–1, 2–3 | | | Aquatic Centre, Manisa |

| 2 July 2024; 18:00 | Report | Greece | 12–12; PSO: 2–4 | Hungary | Aquatic Centre, Manisa |
| 2 July 2024; 18:00 | Report | Score by quarters: 1–3, 2–2, 4–5, 5–2 | | | Aquatic Centre, Manisa |

| 2 July 2024; 19:30 | Report | United States | 10–16 | Spain | Aquatic Centre, Manisa |
| 2 July 2024; 19:30 | Report | Score by quarters: 1–4, 2–4, 3–4, 4–4 | | | Aquatic Centre, Manisa |

| 2 July 2024; 21:00 | Report | Australia | 13–8 | Italy | Aquatic Centre, Manisa |
| 2 July 2024; 21:00 | Report | Score by quarters: 4–3, 1–1, 4–4, 4–0 | | | Aquatic Centre, Manisa |

=== 5th–8th place semifinals ===
| 3 July 2024; 16:30 | Report | Netherlands | 7–14 | Greece | Aquatic Centre, Manisa |
| 3 July 2024; 16:30 | Report | Score by quarters: 2–3, 2–3, 1–6, 2–2 | | | Aquatic Centre, Manisa |

| 3 July 2024; 18:00 | Report | United States | 11–11; PSO: 1–3 | Italy | Aquatic Centre, Manisa |
| 3 July 2024; 18:00 | Report | Score by quarters: 2–1, 3–3, 3–3, 3–4 | | | Aquatic Centre, Manisa |

==== 7th place match ====
| 4 July 2024; 15:30 | Report | Netherlands | 10–11 | United States | Aquatic Centre, Manisa |
| 4 July 2024; 15:30 | Report | Score by quarters: 3–3, 3–2, 2–3, 2–3 | | | Aquatic Centre, Manisa |

==== 5th place match ====
| 4 July 2024; 17:00 | Report | Greece | 15–9 | Italy | Aquatic Centre, Manisa |
| 4 July 2024; 17:00 | Report | Score by quarters: 5–2, 1–2, 3–4, 6–1 | | | Aquatic Centre, Manisa |

=== Semifinals ===
| 3 July 2024; 19:30 | Report | Croatia | 13–18 | Hungary | Aquatic Centre, Manisa |
| 3 July 2024; 19:30 | Report | Score by quarters: 4–5, 2–5, 2–3, 5–5 | | | Aquatic Centre, Manisa |

| 3 July 2024; 21:00 | Report | Spain | 14–7 | Australia | Aquatic Centre, Manisa |
| 3 July 2024; 21:00 | Report | Score by quarters: 4–2, 3–1, 4–0, 3–4 | | | Aquatic Centre, Manisa |

==== 3rd place match ====
| 4 July 2024; 19:00 | Report | Croatia | 10–13 | Australia | Aquatic Centre, Manisa |
| 4 July 2024; 19:00 | Report | Score by quarters: 5–4, 0–3, 3–4, 2–2 | | | Aquatic Centre, Manisa |

==== Final ====
| 4 July 2024; 20:30 | Report | Hungary | 7–10 | Spain | Aquatic Centre, Manisa |
| 4 July 2024; 20:30 | Report | Score by quarters: 0–2, 1–3, 3–3, 3–2 | | | Aquatic Centre, Manisa |

== Final standings ==
| Rank | Team |
|---|---|
| 1st place, gold medalist(s) | Spain |
| 2nd place, silver medalist(s) | Hungary |
| 3rd place, bronze medalist(s) | Australia |
| 4 | Croatia |
| 5 | Greece |
| 6 | Italy |
| 7 | United States |
| 8 | Netherlands |
| 9 | China |
| 10 | Germany |
| 11 | Canada |
| 12 | Serbia |
| 13 | Turkey |
| 14 | Thailand |
| 15 | South Africa |
| 16 | Ukraine |
| 17 | Kazakhstan |
| 18 | Czech Republic |
| 19 | France |
| 20 | Malta |
| 21 | New Zealand |
| 22 | Zimbabwe |
