= United States men's national cadet water polo team =

- FINA code: USA
- Association: USA Water Polo
- Confederation: UANA (Americas)

U16 World Championship
- Appearances: 3 (first in 2022)
- Best result: 4th (2026)

Pan American Championship (U17)
- Appearances: 1 (first in 2025)
- Best result: (2025)

U15 Pan American Championship
- Appearances: 2 (first in 2023)
- Best result: (2023)

Media
- Website: usawaterpolo.org
Medal record
Men's water polo
Pan American Championship (U17)
Bronze medal – third place	2025 Medellin	Team
U15 Pan American Championship
Gold medal – first place	2023 Lima	Team
Silver medal – second place	2025 Bauru	Team

The United States men's national cadet water polo team represents the United States in men's World Aquatics U16 Water Polo Championships. It is an international water polo tournament held every two years for the players under the age of 16. It was launched by World Aquatics in 2022.

== Results ==
=== Major tournaments ===
==== Competitive record ====
Tournament	Appearances	Finishes				
Tournament	Appearances	Champions	Runners-up	Third place	Fourth place	Total
U16 World Championship	3	0	0	0	1	1
Pan American Championship (U17)	1	0	0	1	0	1
U15 Pan American Championship	2	1	1	0	0	2
Total	6	1	1	1	1	4

==== U16 World Championship ====
Year	Result	Pld	W	L	D
(Greece) 2022	9th place	6	4	2	0
(Malta) 2024	5th place	7	6	1	0
(Croatia) 2026	4th place	7	5	2	0
Total	0 Title	20	15	5	0

==== Pan American Championship (U17) ====
Year	Result	Pld	W	L	D
(Colombia) 2025	Bronze medal	8	7	1	0
Total	0 Title	8	7	1	0

==== U15 Pan American Championship ====
Year	Result	Pld	W	L	D
(Peru) 2023	Gold medal	12	12	0	0
(Brazil) 2025	Silver medal	6	4	2	0
Total	1 Title	18	16	2	0
