= Ukraine men's national water polo team =

Ukraine
- FINA code: UKR
- Association: Ukrainian Swimming Federation
- Confederation: LEN (Europe)

Olympic Games
- Appearances: 1 (first in 1996)
- Best result: 12th place (1996)

The Ukraine men's national water polo team represents Ukraine in international men's water polo competitions. The team was established in 1992 after the collapse of the Soviet Union. The highest achievements in the history of independent Ukraine are 12th place at the 1996 Summer Olympics in Atlanta and 7th place at the 1995 European Championships in Vienna.

== Results ==
=== Olympic Games ===
- 1996 — 12th place

=== World League ===
- 2019 — DNQ (finished last in the group at the European Qualification)
- 2021 — DNQ (finished last in the group at the European Qualification)

=== European Championship ===
- 1993 — 11th place
- 1995 — 7th place
- 1997 — 11th place

== Notable players ==
- Aleksei Barkalov
- Andriy Kovalenko
