= World Aquatics U16 Water Polo Championships =

International youth water polo competition

- Sport: Water polo
- Founded: 2022
- Organizing body: World Aquatics
- Continent: All (International)
- Most recent champions: Men; Croatia (1st title); Women; Greece (1st title)
- Most titles: Men; Hungary; Spain; Croatia (1 title each); Women; Greece; Hungary; Spain (1 title each)

The World Aquatics U16 Water Polo Championships, formerly known as the FINA World U16 Water Polo Championships, is an international water polo tournament held every two years for the players under the age of 16. It was launched by FINA in 2022.

== Editions ==
=== Men ===
| Ed. | Year | Host | (gold) Gold | (silver) Silver | (bronze) Bronze |
|---|---|---|---|---|---|
| 1 | 2022 | Larisa & Volos, Greece | Hungary | Greece | Serbia |
| 2 | 2024 | Gzira and Cospicua, Malta | Spain | Italy | Hungary |
| 3 | 2026 | Zagreb, Croatia | Croatia | Spain | Serbia |

=== Women ===
| Ed. | Year | Host | (gold) Gold | (silver) Silver | (bronze) Bronze |
|---|---|---|---|---|---|
| 1 | 2022 | Larisa & Volos, Greece | Hungary | Greece | Spain |
| 2 | 2024 | Manisa, Turkey | Spain | Hungary | Australia |
| 3 | 2026 | Zagreb, Croatia | Greece | Spain | Netherlands |

== Medals ==
=== Men ===
| Rank | Nation | Gold | Silver | Bronze | Total |
|---|---|---|---|---|---|
| 1 | Spain | 1 | 1 | 0 | 2 |
| 2 | Hungary | 1 | 0 | 1 | 2 |
| 3 | Croatia | 1 | 0 | 0 | 1 |
| 4 | Greece | 0 | 1 | 0 | 1 |
| 4 | Italy | 0 | 1 | 0 | 1 |
| 6 | Serbia | 0 | 0 | 2 | 2 |
| Totals (6 entries) | | 3 | 3 | 3 | 9 |

=== Women ===
| Rank | Nation | Gold | Silver | Bronze | Total |
|---|---|---|---|---|---|
| 1 | Spain | 1 | 1 | 1 | 3 |
| 2 | Greece | 1 | 1 | 0 | 2 |
| 2 | Hungary | 1 | 1 | 0 | 2 |
| 4 | Australia | 0 | 0 | 1 | 1 |
| 4 | Netherlands | 0 | 0 | 1 | 1 |
| Totals (5 entries) | | 3 | 3 | 3 | 9 |

== See also ==
- World Aquatics U18 Water Polo Championships
- World Aquatics U20 Water Polo Championships
