= Pan American Aquatics U19 Water Polo Championships =

International youth water polo competition

- Current season, competition or edition: 2026 Pan American U19 Water Polo Championship – Men's tournament 2026 Pan American U19 Water Polo Championship – Women's tournament
- Sport: Water polo
- Founded: 2022
- Organizing body: PanAm Aquatics
- Continent: Americas
- Most recent champions: Men: United States (2nd title); Women: United States (2nd title)
- Most titles: Men: United States (2 titles); Women: United States (2 titles)
- Qualification: World Aquatics U20 Water Polo Championships
- Related competitions: Pan American Aquatics U15 Water Polo Championships, Pan American Aquatics U17 Water Polo Championships

The Pan American Aquatics U19 Water Polo Championships are international water polo tournaments for under-19 boys' and girls' national water polo teams from North and South America, organized by PanAm Aquatics (UANA or ASUA). They also serve as continental qualifiers for the U20 World Championships.

== Results ==
=== Men ===
| Year | Host | Champion | Runner-up | Third place | Fourth place |
|---|---|---|---|---|---|
| 2022 | Indianapolis, United States | Brazil | United States | Argentina | Canada |
| 2024 | Santa Tecla, El Salvador | United States | Canada | Brazil | Colombia |
| 2026 | Bauru, Brazil | United States | Brazil | Argentina | Canada |

=== Women ===
| Year | Host | Champion | Runner-up | Third place | Fourth place |
|---|---|---|---|---|---|
| 2022 | Indianapolis, United States | United States | Canada | Argentina | Chile |
| 2024 | Santa Tecla, El Salvador | Brazil | Argentina | United States | Canada |
| 2026 | Bauru, Brazil | United States | Brazil | Canada | Mexico |

== Medal table ==
| Rank | Nation | Gold | Silver | Bronze | Total |
|---|---|---|---|---|---|
| 1 | United States | 4 | 1 | 1 | 6 |
| 2 | Brazil | 2 | 2 | 1 | 5 |
| 3 | Canada | 0 | 2 | 1 | 3 |
| 4 | Argentina | 0 | 1 | 3 | 4 |
| Totals (4 entries) | | 6 | 6 | 6 | 18 |

== See also ==
- Pan American Aquatics U15 Water Polo Championships
