= 2024 Pan American U19 Water Polo Championship – Women's tournament =

Tournament details
- Host country: El Salvador
- City: Santa Tecla
- Venue: 1 (in 1 host city)
- Dates: 21–26 May 2024
- Teams: 7 (from 1 confederation)

Final positions
- Champions: Brazil
- Runners-up: Argentina
- Third place: United States
- Fourth place: Canada

Tournament statistics
- Matches played: 24
- Goals scored: 600 (25 per match)
- Top scorer: (Colombia) Salomé Agudelo (29 goals)

Official website
- sansalvador2024

The 2024 Pan American U19 Water Polo Championship – Women's tournament was an international youth water polo tournament organized by the PanAm Aquatics. The event was held in Santa Tecla, El Salvador, from 21 to 26 May 2024.

The tournament also served as the Americas' qualifiers for the 2025 World Aquatics Women's U20 Water Polo Championships, where the top five teams qualified.

Players born in 2005 or later were eligible to participate.

== Format ==
Seven teams entered the championship. In the first round, all teams played round-robin in one group. In the final round, the three final classification matches were played to determine the final standings.

All times are local (Central Time Zone; UTC-6).

== First round ==
Pos	Team	Pld	W	PSW	PSL	L	GF	GA	GD	Pts	Qualification
1	Brazil	6	5	0	0	1	99	63	+36	15	Final
2	Argentina	6	4	1	0	1	90	65	+25	14	Final
3	United States	6	4	0	1	1	99	56	+43	13	3rd place match
4	Canada	6	4	0	0	2	101	59	+42	12	3rd place match
5	Colombia	6	2	0	0	4	78	90	−12	6	5th place match
6	Mexico	6	1	0	0	5	37	88	−51	3	5th place match
7	Chile	6	0	0	0	6	34	117	−83	0	

Source: sansalvador2024.panamaquaticsevents.com

21 May 2024; 8:00	Report	Chile	4–22	United States	Polideportivo de Ciudad Merliot, Santa Tecla
21 May 2024; 8:00	Report	Score by quarters: 0–9, 3–3, 1–5, 0–5			Polideportivo de Ciudad Merliot, Santa Tecla

21 May 2024; 9:20	Report	Brazil	17–15	Canada	Polideportivo de Ciudad Merliot, Santa Tecla
21 May 2024; 9:20	Report	Score by quarters: 2–4, 4–5, 7–3, 4–3			Polideportivo de Ciudad Merliot, Santa Tecla

21 May 2024; 13:00	Report	Argentina	15–7	Mexico	Polideportivo de Ciudad Merliot, Santa Tecla
21 May 2024; 13:00	Report	Score by quarters: 3–0, 2–3, 6–2, 4–2			Polideportivo de Ciudad Merliot, Santa Tecla

21 May 2024; 17:00	Report	United States	24–11	Colombia	Polideportivo de Ciudad Merliot, Santa Tecla
21 May 2024; 17:00	Report	Score by quarters: 5–2, 6–4, 7–4, 6–1			Polideportivo de Ciudad Merliot, Santa Tecla

22 May 2024; 8:00	Report	Mexico	11–9	Chile	Polideportivo de Ciudad Merliot, Santa Tecla
22 May 2024; 8:00	Report	Score by quarters: 4–3, 2–2, 4–1, 1–3			Polideportivo de Ciudad Merliot, Santa Tecla

22 May 2024; 9:20	Report	Argentina	16–12	Colombia	Polideportivo de Ciudad Merliot, Santa Tecla
22 May 2024; 9:20	Report	Score by quarters: 5–4, 2–3, 4–2, 5–3			Polideportivo de Ciudad Merliot, Santa Tecla

22 May 2024; 14:20	Report	Brazil	11–12	United States	Polideportivo de Ciudad Merliot, Santa Tecla
22 May 2024; 14:20	Report	Score by quarters: 3–5, 3–2, 2–2, 3–3			Polideportivo de Ciudad Merliot, Santa Tecla

22 May 2024; 17:00	Report	Canada	18–7	Mexico	Polideportivo de Ciudad Merliot, Santa Tecla
22 May 2024; 17:00	Report	Score by quarters: 3–2, 3–1, 5–3, 7–1			Polideportivo de Ciudad Merliot, Santa Tecla

23 May 2024; 8:00	Report	Colombia	22–6	Chile	Polideportivo de Ciudad Merliot, Santa Tecla
23 May 2024; 8:00	Report	Score by quarters: 4–1, 5–1, 10–1, 3–3			Polideportivo de Ciudad Merliot, Santa Tecla

23 May 2024; 9:20	Report	Canada	13–14	Argentina	Polideportivo de Ciudad Merliot, Santa Tecla
23 May 2024; 9:20	Report	Score by quarters: 1–5, 6–4, 4–3, 2–2			Polideportivo de Ciudad Merliot, Santa Tecla

23 May 2024; 13:00	Report	Mexico	3–16	United States	Polideportivo de Ciudad Merliot, Santa Tecla
23 May 2024; 13:00	Report	Score by quarters: 1–4, 0–4, 0–4, 2–4			Polideportivo de Ciudad Merliot, Santa Tecla

23 May 2024; 17:00	Report	Brazil	23–7	Chile	Polideportivo de Ciudad Merliot, Santa Tecla
23 May 2024; 17:00	Report	Score by quarters: 2–2, 9–2, 6–3, 6–0			Polideportivo de Ciudad Merliot, Santa Tecla

24 May 2024; 8:00	Report	Colombia	15–2	Mexico	Polideportivo de Ciudad Merliot, Santa Tecla
24 May 2024; 8:00	Report	Score by quarters: 4–0, 0–0, 5–2, 6–0			Polideportivo de Ciudad Merliot, Santa Tecla

24 May 2024; 9:20	Report	Chile	4–19	Argentina	Polideportivo de Ciudad Merliot, Santa Tecla
24 May 2024; 9:20	Report	Score by quarters: 1–8, 2–3, 1–4, 0–4			Polideportivo de Ciudad Merliot, Santa Tecla

24 May 2024; 14:20	Report	United States	10–12	Canada	Polideportivo de Ciudad Merliot, Santa Tecla
24 May 2024; 14:20	Report	Score by quarters: 3–2, 3–3, 2–4, 2–3			Polideportivo de Ciudad Merliot, Santa Tecla

24 May 2024; 18:20	Report	Argentina	11–14	Brazil	Polideportivo de Ciudad Merliot, Santa Tecla
24 May 2024; 18:20	Report	Score by quarters: 4–6, 3–3, 2–2, 2–3			Polideportivo de Ciudad Merliot, Santa Tecla

25 May 2024; 8:00	Report	Canada	23–7	Colombia	Polideportivo de Ciudad Merliot, Santa Tecla
25 May 2024; 8:00	Report	Score by quarters: 7–4, 6–0, 4–2, 6–1			Polideportivo de Ciudad Merliot, Santa Tecla

25 May 2024; 9:20	Report	Mexico	7–15	Brazil	Polideportivo de Ciudad Merliot, Santa Tecla
25 May 2024; 9:20	Report	Score by quarters: 2–4, 2–3, 2–4, 1–4			Polideportivo de Ciudad Merliot, Santa Tecla

25 May 2024; 17:00	Report	Colombia	11–19	Brazil	Polideportivo de Ciudad Merliot, Santa Tecla
25 May 2024; 17:00	Report	Score by quarters: 3–6, 5–4, 0–6, 3–3			Polideportivo de Ciudad Merliot, Santa Tecla

25 May 2024; 18:20	Report	Chile	4–20	Canada	Polideportivo de Ciudad Merliot, Santa Tecla
25 May 2024; 18:20	Report	Score by quarters: 1–5, 1–6, 0–6, 2–3			Polideportivo de Ciudad Merliot, Santa Tecla

25 May 2024; 19:40	Report	Argentina	15–15; PSO: 4–3	United States	Polideportivo de Ciudad Merliot, Santa Tecla
25 May 2024; 19:40	Report	Score by quarters: 4–3, 4–3, 3–4, 4–5			Polideportivo de Ciudad Merliot, Santa Tecla

== Playoffs ==
=== 5th place match ===
26 May 2024; 9:20	Report	Colombia	9–9; PSO: 3–4	Mexico	Polideportivo de Ciudad Merliot, Santa Tecla
26 May 2024; 9:20	Report	Score by quarters: 2–3, 3–2, 2–2, 2–2			Polideportivo de Ciudad Merliot, Santa Tecla

=== 3rd place match ===
26 May 2024; 13:00	Report	Canada	10–10; PSO: 2–4	United States	Polideportivo de Ciudad Merliot, Santa Tecla
26 May 2024; 13:00	Report	Score by quarters: 3–5, 3–2, 2–1, 2–2			Polideportivo de Ciudad Merliot, Santa Tecla

=== Final ===
26 May 2024; 15:40	Report	Brazil	15–9	Argentina	Polideportivo de Ciudad Merliot, Santa Tecla
26 May 2024; 15:40	Report	Score by quarters: 4–0, 3–4, 4–1, 4–4			Polideportivo de Ciudad Merliot, Santa Tecla

== Final standings ==
Rank	Team
1st place, gold medalist(s)	Brazil
2nd place, silver medalist(s)	Argentina
3rd place, bronze medalist(s)	United States
4	Canada
5	Mexico
6	Colombia
7	Chile

Qualified for the 2025 World Aquatics Women's U20 Water Polo Championships
