= 2026 Pan American U19 Water Polo Championship – Men's tournament =

Tournament details
- Host country: Brazil
- City: Bauru
- Venue: 1 (in 1 host city)
- Dates: 28 September – 4 October 2026
- Teams: 6 (from 1 confederation)

Final positions
- Champions: United States (2nd title)
- Runners-up: Brazil
- Third place: Argentina
- Fourth place: Canada

Official website
- bauru2026

The 2026 Pan American U19 Water Polo Championship – Men's tournament was the third edition of the Pan American Aquatics U19 Water Polo Championships, an international youth water polo tournament organized by the PanAm Aquatics. The event took place in Bauru, Brazil, from 28 September to 4 October 2026.

United States secured their second overall title with a victory over Brazil in the final, 19–13.

The tournament also served as the Americas' qualifier for the 2027 World Aquatics Men's U20 Water Polo Championships, where the top five teams qualified.

Players born in 2007 or later were eligible to participate.

== Format ==
Six teams entered the championship. In the first round, all teams played round-robin in one common group. The top four teams advanced to semifinals; the bottom two teams were dropped to the 5th place match.

All times are local (Brasília time; UTC-3).

== Group stage ==
Pos	Team	Pld	W	PSW	PSL	L	GF	GA	GD	Pts	Qualification
1	Brazil (H)	5	4	1	0	0	103	54	49	14	Semifinals
2	United States	5	4	0	1	0	120	40	80	13	Semifinals
3	Canada	5	3	0	0	2	88	79	9	9	Semifinals
4	Argentina	5	2	0	0	3	71	72	−1	6	Semifinals
5	Mexico	5	1	0	0	4	58	117	−59	3	5th place match
6	Peru	5	0	0	0	5	38	116	−78	0	5th place match

Source: bauru2026.panamaquaticsevents.com
(H) Hosts

28 September 2026; 13:30	Report	Mexico	14–17	Argentina	ABDA Arena (indoor pool), Bauru
28 September 2026; 13:30	Report	Score by quarters: 2–4, 3–5, 3–5, 6–3			ABDA Arena (indoor pool), Bauru

28 September 2026; 16:30	Report	United States	26–4	Peru	ABDA Arena (indoor pool), Bauru
28 September 2026; 16:30	Report	Score by quarters: 9–0, 5–1, 6–1, 6–2			ABDA Arena (indoor pool), Bauru

28 September 2026; 20:30	Report	Brazil	16–12	Canada	ABDA Arena (indoor pool), Bauru
28 September 2026; 20:30	Report	Score by quarters: 2–2, 4–2, 6–4, 4–4			ABDA Arena (indoor pool), Bauru

29 September 2026; 14:30	Report	Argentina	22–7	Peru	ABDA Arena (indoor pool), Bauru
29 September 2026; 14:30	Report	Score by quarters: 6–1, 7–4, 4–1, 5–1			ABDA Arena (indoor pool), Bauru

29 September 2026; 17:30	Report	Canada	9–28	United States	ABDA Arena (indoor pool), Bauru
29 September 2026; 17:30	Report	Score by quarters: 2–6, 2–7, 4–7, 1–8			ABDA Arena (indoor pool), Bauru

29 September 2026; 20:30	Report	Mexico	10–28	Brazil	ABDA Arena (indoor pool), Bauru
29 September 2026; 20:30	Report	Score by quarters: 2–7, 1–7, 6–7, 1–7			ABDA Arena (indoor pool), Bauru

30 September 2026; 14:30	Report	Peru	11–14	Mexico	ABDA Arena (indoor pool), Bauru
30 September 2026; 14:30	Report	Score by quarters: 1–6, 3–1, 3–4, 4–3			ABDA Arena (indoor pool), Bauru

30 September 2026; 17:30	Report	Argentina	13–14	Canada	ABDA Arena (indoor pool), Bauru
30 September 2026; 17:30	Report	Score by quarters: 1–7, 5–3, 4–1, 3–3			ABDA Arena (indoor pool), Bauru

30 September 2026; 20:30	Report	Brazil	13–13; PSO: 7–6	United States	ABDA Arena (indoor pool), Bauru
30 September 2026; 20:30	Report	Score by quarters: 5–2, 2–4, 3–5, 3–2			ABDA Arena (indoor pool), Bauru

1 October 2026; 14:30	Report	United States	18–7	Argentina	ABDA Arena (indoor pool), Bauru
1 October 2026; 14:30	Report	Score by quarters: 3–2, 4–3, 5–1, 6–1			ABDA Arena (indoor pool), Bauru

1 October 2026; 17:30	Report	Canada	26–13	Mexico	ABDA Arena (indoor pool), Bauru
1 October 2026; 17:30	Report	Score by quarters: 4–5, 8–3, 7–2, 7–3			ABDA Arena (indoor pool), Bauru

1 October 2026; 20:30	Report	Brazil	27–7	Peru	ABDA Arena (indoor pool), Bauru
1 October 2026; 20:30	Report	Score by quarters: 5–1, 6–2, 9–3, 7–1			ABDA Arena (indoor pool), Bauru

2 October 2026; 14:30	Report	Canada	27–9	Peru	ABDA Arena (indoor pool), Bauru
2 October 2026; 14:30	Report	Score by quarters: 9–1, 4–3, 8–4, 6–1			ABDA Arena (indoor pool), Bauru

2 October 2026; 17:30	Report	Mexico	7–35	United States	ABDA Arena (indoor pool), Bauru
2 October 2026; 17:30	Report	Score by quarters: 1–7, 3–9, 1–13, 2–6			ABDA Arena (indoor pool), Bauru

2 October 2026; 20:30	Report	Argentina	12–19	Brazil	ABDA Arena (indoor pool), Bauru
2 October 2026; 20:30	Report	Score by quarters: 3–4, 1–8, 3–3, 5–4			ABDA Arena (indoor pool), Bauru

== Playoffs ==
=== Brackets ===
Semifinals
1	Brazil	12
4	Argentina	7
2	United States	23
3	Canada	6

Final
Brazil	13
United States	19
3rd place match
Argentina	18
Canada	11

5th place match
5	Mexico	14
6	Peru	13

=== Semifinals ===
3 October 2026; 16:00	Report	Brazil	12–7	Argentina	ABDA Arena (indoor pool), Bauru
3 October 2026; 16:00	Report	Score by quarters: 3–2, 2–2, 2–0, 5–3			ABDA Arena (indoor pool), Bauru

3 October 2026; 17:30	Report	United States	23–6	Canada	ABDA Arena (indoor pool), Bauru
3 October 2026; 17:30	Report	Score by quarters: 4–2, 5–3, 6–0, 8–1			ABDA Arena (indoor pool), Bauru

=== 5th place match ===
4 October 2026; 13:30	Report	Mexico	14–13	Peru	ABDA Arena (indoor pool), Bauru
4 October 2026; 13:30	Report	Score by quarters: 3–3, 3–2, 7–4, 1–4			ABDA Arena (indoor pool), Bauru

=== 3rd place match ===
4 October 2026; 16:30	Report	Argentina	18–11	Canada	ABDA Arena (indoor pool), Bauru
4 October 2026; 16:30	Report	Score by quarters: 2–2, 6–4, 5–4, 5–1			ABDA Arena (indoor pool), Bauru

=== Final ===
4 October 2026; 19:30	Report	Brazil	13–19	United States	ABDA Arena (indoor pool), Bauru
4 October 2026; 19:30	Report	Score by quarters: –, –, –, –			ABDA Arena (indoor pool), Bauru

== Final standings ==
Rank	Team
1st place, gold medalist(s)	United States
2nd place, silver medalist(s)	Brazil
3rd place, bronze medalist(s)	Argentina
4	Canada
5	Mexico
6	Peru
