= United States men's national junior water polo team =

- FINA code: USA
- Association: USA Water Polo
- Confederation: UANA (Americas)

U20 World Championship
- Appearances: 21 (first in 1981)
- Best result: (2025)

U19 Pan American Championship
- Appearances: 1 (first in 2026)
- Best result: (2026)

Media
- Website: usawaterpolo.org
Medal record
Men's water polo
U20 World Championship
Silver medal – second place	2025 Zagreb	Team
Bronze medal – third place	2023 Otopeni / Bucharest	Team
U19 Pan American Championship
Gold medal – first place	2026 Bauru	Team
- Last updated: October 4, 2026

The United States men's national junior water polo team represents the United States in men's World Aquatics U20 Water Polo Championships. It is an international water polo tournament held every two years for the players under the age of 20.

The team won a silver medal in 2025, the highest finish ever for a USA men's national water polo team in World Championship at any age group.

== Results ==
=== Major tournaments ===
==== Competitive record ====
Updated after the 2026 Pan American U19 Water Polo Championship – Men's tournament.

Tournament	Appearances	Finishes				
Tournament	Appearances	Champions	Runners-up	Third place	Fourth place	Total
U20 World Championship	21	0	1	1	1	3
U19 Pan American Championship	1	1	0	0	0	1
Total	22	1	1	1	1	4

==== U20 World Championship ====
Year	Result	Pld	W	L	D
(Italy) 1981	9th place	7	5	2	0
(Spain) 1983	7th place	6	2	3	1
(Turkey) 1985	6th place	7	2	4	1
(Brazil) 1987	6th place	7	4	1	2
(France) 1989	4th place	6	3	3	0
(United States) 1991	5th place	7	5	1	1
(Egypt) 1993	5th place	—N/a			
(France) 1995	13th place	4	1	3	0
(Cuba) 1997	10th place	9	5	4	0
(Kuwait) 1999	Did not participated				
(Turkey) 2001	6th place	9	6	3	0
(Italy) 2003	11th place	8	4	3	1
(Argentina) 2005	11th place	8	3	3	2
(United States) 2007	6th place	9	7	2	0
(Croatia) 2009	8th place	7	3	4	0
(Greece) 2011	9th place	7	4	3	0
(Hungary) 2013	5th place	7	5	2	0
(Kazakhstan) 2015	Did not participated				
(Serbia) 2017	8th place	8	4	4	0
(Kuwait) 2019	7th place	8	5	3	0
(Czech Republic) 2021	7th place	8	4	4	0
(Romania) 2023	Bronze medal	7	4	3	0
(Croatia) 2025	Silver medal	7	4	3	0
Total	0 Title	146	80	58	8

==== U19 Pan American Championship ====
Year	Result	Pld	W	L	D
(United States) 2022	See United States men's national youth water polo team				
(El Salvador) 2024	See United States men's national youth water polo team				
(Brazil) 2026	Gold medal	7	6	1	0
Total	1 Title	7	6	1	0
