= 2026 Pan American U19 Water Polo Championship – Women's tournament =

Tournament details
- Host country: Brazil
- City: Bauru
- Venue: 1 (in 1 host city)
- Dates: 28 September – 4 October 2026
- Teams: 4 (from 1 confederation)

Final positions
- Champions: United States (2nd title)
- Runners-up: Brazil
- Third place: Canada
- Fourth place: Mexico

Official website
- bauru2026

The 2026 Pan American U19 Water Polo Championship – Women's tournament was the third edition of the Pan American Aquatics U19 Water Polo Championships, an international youth water polo tournament organized by the PanAm Aquatics. The event took place in Bauru, Brazil, from 28 September to 4 October 2026.

United States secured their second overall title with a victory over Brazil in the final, 20–8.

Players born in 2007 or later were eligible to participate.

== Format ==
Four teams entered the championship. In the first round, all teams played double round-robin in one common group. All teams advanced to semifinals.

All times are local (Brasília time; UTC-3).

== Group stage ==
Pos	Team	Pld	W	PSW	PSL	L	GF	GA	GD	Pts
1	United States	6	6	0	0	0	135	30	105	18
2	Brazil (H)	6	3	0	0	3	84	72	12	9
3	Canada	6	3	0	0	3	96	92	4	9
4	Mexico	6	0	0	0	6	30	151	−121	0

Source: bauru2026.panamaquaticsevents.com
(H) Hosts

28 September 2026; 15:00	Report	United States	25–0	Mexico	ABDA Arena (indoor pool), Bauru
28 September 2026; 15:00	Report	Score by quarters: 9–0, 7–0, 2–0, 7–0			ABDA Arena (indoor pool), Bauru

28 September 2026; 19:00	Report	Brazil	12–14	Canada	ABDA Arena (indoor pool), Bauru
28 September 2026; 19:00	Report	Score by quarters: 3–5, 1–4, 3–2, 5–3			ABDA Arena (indoor pool), Bauru

29 September 2026; 16:00	Report	Canada	4–25	United States	ABDA Arena (indoor pool), Bauru
29 September 2026; 16:00	Report	Score by quarters: 2–7, 2–6, 0–7, 0–5			ABDA Arena (indoor pool), Bauru

29 September 2026; 19:00	Report	Mexico	5–20	Brazil	ABDA Arena (indoor pool), Bauru
29 September 2026; 19:00	Report	Score by quarters: 1–5, 2–6, 1–4, 1–5			ABDA Arena (indoor pool), Bauru

30 September 2026; 16:00	Report	Canada	31–9	Mexico	ABDA Arena (indoor pool), Bauru
30 September 2026; 16:00	Report	Score by quarters: 8–3, 8–0, 7–4, 8–2			ABDA Arena (indoor pool), Bauru

30 September 2026; 19:00	Report	Brazil	8–14	United States	ABDA Arena (indoor pool), Bauru
30 September 2026; 19:00	Report	Score by quarters: 1–6, 2–4, 4–3, 1–1			ABDA Arena (indoor pool), Bauru

1 October 2026; 16:00	Report	Mexico	1–30	United States	ABDA Arena (indoor pool), Bauru
1 October 2026; 16:00	Report	Score by quarters: 0–8, 1–7, 0–8, 0–7			ABDA Arena (indoor pool), Bauru

1 October 2026; 19:00	Report	Canada	13–16	Brazil	ABDA Arena (indoor pool), Bauru
1 October 2026; 19:00	Report	Score by quarters: 4–5, 3–3, 3–4, 3–4			ABDA Arena (indoor pool), Bauru

2 October 2026; 16:00	Report	United States	19–10	Canada	ABDA Arena (indoor pool), Bauru
2 October 2026; 16:00	Report	Score by quarters: 2–1, 5–1, 7–2, 5–6			ABDA Arena (indoor pool), Bauru

2 October 2026; 19:00	Report	Brazil	21–4	Mexico	ABDA Arena (indoor pool), Bauru
2 October 2026; 19:00	Report	Score by quarters: 7–0, 4–0, 7–2, 3–2			ABDA Arena (indoor pool), Bauru

3 October 2026; 9:00	Report	Mexico	11–24	Canada	ABDA Arena (indoor pool), Bauru
3 October 2026; 9:00	Report	Score by quarters: 2–5, 5–7, 2–7, 2–5			ABDA Arena (indoor pool), Bauru

3 October 2026; 10:30	Report	United States	22–7	Brazil	ABDA Arena (indoor pool), Bauru
3 October 2026; 10:30	Report	Score by quarters: 4–0, 4–4, 7–3, 7–0			ABDA Arena (indoor pool), Bauru

== Playoffs ==
=== Bracket ===
Semifinals
1	United States	31
4	Mexico	2
2	Brazil	12
3	Canada	11

Final
United States	20
Brazil	8
3rd place match
Mexico	3
Canada	28

=== Semifinals ===
3 October 2026; 19:00	Report	United States	31–2	Mexico	ABDA Arena (indoor pool), Bauru
3 October 2026; 19:00	Report	Score by quarters: 7–0, 8–0, 9–0, 7–2			ABDA Arena (indoor pool), Bauru

3 October 2026; 20:30	Report	Brazil	12–11	Canada	ABDA Arena (indoor pool), Bauru
3 October 2026; 20:30	Report	Score by quarters: 1–2, 5–2, 2–4, 4–3			ABDA Arena (indoor pool), Bauru

=== 3rd place match ===
4 October 2026; 15:00	Report	Mexico	3–28	Canada	ABDA Arena (indoor pool), Bauru
4 October 2026; 15:00	Report	Score by quarters: 0–7, 1–8, 1–5, 1–8			ABDA Arena (indoor pool), Bauru

=== Final ===
4 October 2026; 18:00	Report	United States	20–8	Brazil	ABDA Arena (indoor pool), Bauru
4 October 2026; 18:00	Report	Score by quarters: 5–4, 3–1, 6–1, 6–2			ABDA Arena (indoor pool), Bauru

== Final standings ==
Rank	Team
1st place, gold medalist(s)	United States
2nd place, silver medalist(s)	Brazil
3rd place, bronze medalist(s)	Canada
4	Mexico
