= 2015 FINA World Women's Junior Water Polo Championships =

Junior women's water polo tournament

Tournament details
- Host country: Greece
- City: Volos
- Venue: 1 (in 1 host city)
- Dates: 17–23 August 2015
- Teams: 16 (from 5 confederations)

Final positions
- Champions: United States (4th title)
- Runners-up: Spain
- Third place: Russia
- Fourth place: Canada

The 2015 FINA World Women's Junior Water Polo Championships was the 11th edition of the women's U20 Water Polo Championship. The tournament was played in Volos, Greece, 17–23 August 2015.

== Group stage ==
=== Group A ===
Pos	Team	Pld	W	L	GF	GA	GD	Pts	Qualification
1	Greece	3	3	0	65	25	+40	6	Quarter-finals
2	Russia	3	2	1	42	38	+4	5	Quarter-finals
3	Japan	3	1	2	50	53	−3	4	
4	Great Britain	3	0	3	14	55	−41	3	

Source: World Aquatics

=== Group B ===
Pos	Team	Pld	W	L	GF	GA	GD	Pts	Qualification
1	Hungary	3	3	0	46	16	+30	6	Quarter-finals
2	Brazil	3	2	1	36	25	+11	5	Quarter-finals
3	New Zealand	3	1	2	25	38	−13	4	
4	South Africa	3	0	3	13	41	−28	3	

Source: World Aquatics

=== Group C ===
Pos	Team	Pld	W	L	GF	GA	GD	Pts	Qualification
1	Italy	2	2	0	28	26	+2	4	Quarter-finals
2	Canada	2	1	1	37	35	+2	3	Quarter-finals
3	Australia	3	1	2	29	29	0	4	
4	Netherlands	1	0	1	33	37	−4	1	

Source: World Aquatics

=== Group D ===
Pos	Team	Pld	W	L	GF	GA	GD	Pts	Qualification
1	United States	3	3	0	68	16	+52	6	Quarter-finals
2	Spain	3	2	1	69	30	+39	5	Quarter-finals
3	Mexico	3	1	2	16	65	−49	4	
4	Ukraine	3	0	3	15	57	−42	3	

Source: World Aquatics

== Knockout stage ==
=== Brackets ===
==== Championships ====
Round of 16
Russia	18
New Zealand	10
Japan	9
Brazil	12
Canada	20
Mexico	3
Australia	9
Spain	11

Quarter-finals
Russia	15
Italy	10
United States	12
Brazil	9
Canada	10
Greece	9
Hungary	9
Spain	12

Semi-finals
Russia	11
United States	13
Canada	9
Spain	11

Final
United States	13
Spain	10
Third place game
Russia	15
Canada	8

==== 5th–8th place ====
5th–8th place
Greece	11
Hungary	8
Italy	13
Brazil	5

Fifth place game
Greece	12
Italy	7
Seventh place game
Hungary	11
Brazil	10

==== 9th–12th place ====
9th–12th place
New Zealand	12
Mexico	9
Japan	8
Australia	13

Ninth place game
New Zealand	6
Australia	15
Eleventh place game
Mexico	11
Japan	18

==== 13th–16th place ====
13th–16th place
Great Britain	10
South Africa	4
Netherlands	30
Ukraine	4

Thirteenth place game
Great Britain	7
Netherlands	22
Sixteenth place game
South Africa	7
Ukraine	5

=== 9th–12th place classification ===
Report	New Zealand	12–9	Mexico
Report	Score by quarters: 3–3, 5–2, 3–4, 1–0

Report	Japan	8–13	Australia
Report	Score by quarters: 0–1, 4–3, 1–4, 3–5

=== Quarter-finals ===
Report	Greece	9–10	Canada
Report	Score by quarters: 2–2, 2–3, 2–3, 3–2

Report	Hungary	9–12	Spain
Report	Score by quarters: 3–4, 2–4, 3–3, 1–1

Report	Italy	10–15	Russia
Report	Score by quarters: 2–4, 1–2, 2–5, 5–4

Report	United States	12–9	Brazil
Report	Score by quarters: 3–3, 3–2, 4–3, 2–1

=== 5th–8th place classification ===
Report	Greece	11–8	Hungary
Report	Score by quarters: 1–1, 3–2, 4–2, 3–3

Report	Italy	13–5	Brazil
Report	Score by quarters: 1–2, 5–1, 4–1, 3–1

=== Semi-finals ===
Report	Canada	9–11	Spain
Report	Score by quarters: 2–3, 1–2, 3–3, 3–3

Report	Russia	11–13	United States
Report	Score by quarters: 3–4, 1–3, 4–4, 3–2

=== Third place game ===
Report	Canada	8–15	Russia
Report	Score by quarters: 3–3, 1–3, 2–4, 2–5

=== Final ===
Report	Spain	10–13	United States
Report	Score by quarters: 4–4, 1–3, 2–4, 3–2

== Final standings ==
Rank	Team
1st place, gold medalist(s)	United States
2nd place, silver medalist(s)	Spain
3rd place, bronze medalist(s)	Russia
4	Canada
5	Greece
6	Italy
7	Hungary
8	Brazil
9	Australia
10	New Zealand
11	Japan
12	Mexico
13	Netherlands
14	Great Britain
15	South Africa
16	Ukraine
