= 2013 FINA World Women's Junior Water Polo Championships =

Junior women's water polo tournament

Tournament details
- Host country: Greece
- City: Volos
- Venue: 1 (in 1 host city)
- Dates: 19–25 August 2013
- Teams: 15 (from 5 confederations)

Final positions
- Champions: United States (3rd title)
- Runners-up: Spain
- Third place: Greece
- Fourth place: Russia

The 2013 FINA World Women's Junior Water Polo Championships was the 10th edition of the women's U20 Water Polo Championship. The tournament was played in Volos, Greece, from 19 to 25 August 2013.

== Group stage ==
=== Group A ===
Pos	Team	Pld	W	L	GF	GA	GD	Pts	Qualification
1	Greece	2	2	0	19	15	+4	4	Quarter-finals
2	Spain	2	1	1	23	16	+7	3	Quarter-finals
3	Canada	2	0	2	18	29	−11	2	

Source: World Aquatics

=== Group B ===
Pos	Team	Pld	W	L	GF	GA	GD	Pts	Qualification
1	United States	3	3	0	34	14	+20	6	Quarter-finals
2	Italy	3	2	1	19	24	−5	5	Quarter-finals
3	New Zealand	3	1	2	21	32	−11	4	
4	Kazakhstan	3	0	3	16	49	−33	3	

Source: World Aquatics

=== Group C ===
Pos	Team	Pld	W	L	GF	GA	GD	Pts	Qualification
1	Australia	3	3	0	56	10	+46	6	Quarter-finals
2	Uzbekistan	3	1	2	22	27	−5	4	
3	Ukraine	3	1	2	16	40	−24	4	
4	South Africa	3	1	2	18	35	−17	4	

Source: World Aquatics

=== Group D ===
Pos	Team	Pld	W	L	GF	GA	GD	Pts	Qualification
1	Russia	3	3	0	29	7	+22	6	Quarter-finals
2	Hungary	3	2	1	27	13	+14	5	Quarter-finals
3	Great Britain	2	0	2	8	26	−18	2	Quarter-finals
4	Brazil	2	0	2	12	30	−18	2	

Source: World Aquatics

== Knockout stage ==
=== Brackets ===
==== Championships ====
Round of 16
Spain	17
New Zealand	5
Canada	8
Italy	11
Uzbekistan	2
Great Britain	18
Ukraine	4
Hungary	24

Quarter-finals
Spain	8
Australia	7
Russia	10
Italy	9
Greece	16
Great Britain	5
United States	12
Hungary	10

Semi-finals
Spain	9
Russia	8
Greece	3
United States	10

Final
Spain	7
United States	9
Third place game
Russia	6
Greece	7

==== 5th–8th place ====
5th–8th place
Great Britain	5
Hungary	13
Australia	3
Italy	7

Fifth place game
Hungary	6
Italy	10
Seventh place game
Great Britain	3
Australia	14

==== 9th–12th place ====
9th–12th place
New Zealand	20
Uzbekistan	1
Canada	21
Ukraine	1

Ninth place game
New Zealand	9
Canada	12
Eleventh place game
Uzbekistan	5
Ukraine	4

==== 13th–15th place ====
13th–15th place
Kazakhstan	bye
South Africa	1
Brazil	15

Thirteenth place game
Kazakhstan	5
Brazil	10
Fifteenth place
South Africa

=== 9th–12th place classification ===
Report	New Zealand	20–1	Uzbekistan

Report	Canada	21–1	Ukraine

=== Quarter-finals ===
Report	Greece	16–5	Great Britain

Report	United States	12–10	Hungary

Report	Australia	7–8	Spain

Report	Russia	10–9	Italy

=== 5th–8th place classification ===
Report	Great Britain	5–13	Hungary

Report	Australia	3–7	Italy

=== Semi-finals ===
Report	Greece	3–10	United States

Report	Spain	9–8	Russia

=== Third place game ===
Report	Greece	7–6	Russia

=== Final ===
Report	United States	9–7	Spain

== Final standings ==
Rank	Team
1st place, gold medalist(s)	United States
2nd place, silver medalist(s)	Spain
3rd place, bronze medalist(s)	Greece
4	Russia
5	Italy
6	Hungary
7	Australia
8	Great Britain
9	Canada
10	New Zealand
11	Uzbekistan
12	Ukraine
13	Brazil
14	Kazakhstan
15	South Africa
