= 2005 FINA World Women's Junior Water Polo Championships =

Junior women's water polo tournament

Tournament details
- Host country: Australia
- City: Perth
- Venue: 1 (in 1 host city)
- Dates: 20–30 January 2005
- Teams: 15 (from 5 confederations)

Final positions
- Champions: United States (2nd title)
- Runners-up: Russia
- Third place: Australia
- Fourth place: Greece

The 2005 FINA World Women's Junior Water Polo Championships was the 6th edition of the women's U20 Water Polo Championship. The tournament was played in Perth, Australia, from 20 to 30 January 2005.

== Group stage ==
=== Group A ===
Pos	Team	Pld	W	L	GF	GA	GD	Pts	Qualification
1	United States	3	3	0	39	14	+25	6	Quarter-finals
2	Russia	3	2	1	33	23	+10	5	Quarter-finals
3	Hungary	3	1	2	29	25	+4	4	
4	China	3	0	3	10	49	−39	3	

Source: World Aquatics

=== Group B ===
Pos	Team	Pld	W	L	GF	GA	GD	Pts	Qualification
1	Australia	3	3	0	40	15	+25	6	Quarter-finals
2	Spain	3	2	1	32	18	+14	5	Quarter-finals
3	Italy	3	1	2	26	24	+2	4	
4	Brazil	3	0	3	10	51	−41	3	

Source: World Aquatics

=== Group C ===
Pos	Team	Pld	W	L	GF	GA	GD	Pts	Qualification
1	Netherlands	2	2	0	31	21	+10	4	Quarter-finals
2	New Zealand	1	1	0	23	21	+2	2	Quarter-finals
3	Germany	2	1	1	27	23	+4	3	
4	Japan	3	0	3	25	41	−16	3	

Source: World Aquatics

=== Group D ===
Pos	Team	Pld	W	L	GF	GA	GD	Pts	Qualification
1	Greece	2	2	0	15	9	+6	4	Quarter-finals
2	Canada	2	1	1	19	10	+9	3	Quarter-finals
3	Puerto Rico	2	0	2	8	23	−15	2	

Source: World Aquatics

== Knockout stage ==
=== Brackets ===
==== Championships ====
Round of 16
New Zealand	14
Puerto Rico	5
Germany	7
Canada	9
Russia	10
Italy	5
Hungary	6
Spain	8

Quarter-finals
New Zealand	6
United States	8
Australia	10
Canada	7
Russia	8
Netherlands	6
Greece	10
Spain	9

Semi-finals
United States	5
Australia	4
Russia	9
Greece	3

Final
United States	11
Russia	9
Third place game
Australia	10
Greece	4

==== 5th–8th place ====
5th–8th place
New Zealand	4
Canada	7
Netherlands	12
Spain	10

Fifth place game
Canada	10
Netherlands	11
Seventh place game
New Zealand	9
Spain	10

==== 9th–12th place ====
9th–12th place
Italy	12
Puerto Rico	6
Hungary	13
Germany	14

Ninth place game
Italy	5
Germany	3
Eleventh place game
Puerto Rico	6
Hungary	10

==== 13th–15th place ====
Thirteenth place game
China	6
Japan	11
Brazil	bye

Fifteenth place game
China	11
Brazil	9

=== 9th–12th place classification ===
Report	Italy	12–6	Puerto Rico
Report	Score by quarters: 3–2, 2–1, 4–1, 3–2

Report	Hungary	13–14 (PSO)	Germany
Report	Score by quarters: 1–3, 1–2, 4–1, 2–2 PSO: 4–5

=== Quarter-finals ===
Report	United States	8–6	New Zealand
Report	Score by quarters: 2–1, 1–2, 3–1, 2–2

Report	Netherlands	6–8	Russia
Report	Score by quarters: 1–1, 1–3, 3–2, 1–2

Report	Greece	10–9	Spain
Report	Score by quarters: 2–2, 4–1, 2–3, 2–3

Report	Australia	10–7	Canada
Report	Score by quarters: 2–1, 1–2, 5–2, 2–2

=== 5th–8th place classification ===
Report	New Zealand	4–7	Canada
Report	Score by quarters: 1–2, 2–0, 1–3, 0–2

Report	Netherlands	12–10 (PSO)	Spain
Report	Score by quarters: 2–2, 2–3, 0–1, 3–1 PSO: 5–3

=== Semi-finals ===
Report	United States	5–4	Australia
Report	Score by quarters: 1–3, 2–1, 1–0, 1–0

Report	Russia	9–3	Greece
Report	Score by quarters: 3–0, 0–2, 2–1, 4–0

=== Third place game ===
Report	Australia	10–4	Greece
Report	Score by quarters: 2–0, 3–1, 3–2, 2–1

=== Final ===
Report	United States	11–9	Russia
Report	Score by quarters: 1–2, 3–4, 4–0, 3–3

== Final standings ==
Rank	Team
1st place, gold medalist(s)	United States
2nd place, silver medalist(s)	Russia
3rd place, bronze medalist(s)	Australia
4	Greece
5	Netherlands
6	Canada
7	Spain
8	New Zealand
9	Italy
10	Germany
11	Hungary
12	Puerto Rico
13	Japan
14	China
15	Brazil
