= 2025 World Aquatics Men's U20 Water Polo Championships =

U20 men's water polo tournament

Tournament details
- Host country: Croatia
- City: Zagreb
- Venue: 1 (in 1 host city)
- Dates: 14–21 June 2025
- Teams: 20 (from 5 confederations)

Final positions
- Champions: Spain (4th title)
- Runners-up: United States
- Third place: Croatia
- Fourth place: Hungary

Tournament statistics
- Matches played: 62
- Goals scored: 1,709 (27.56 per match)
- Top scorers: (Croatia) Vlaho Pavlić (30 goals)

Awards
- Best player: (United States) Ryder Dodd

Official website
- Zagreb 2025

The 2025 World Aquatics Men's U20 Water Polo Championships was the 23rd edition of the biannual water polo world championship for under-20 men's national teams. The tournament was played in Zagreb, Croatia, from 14 to 21 June 2025. Hungary were the defending champions but lost to United States in the semifinals.

Spain won their fourth title, as they defeated the United States in the final, 14–11.

== Teams ==
Africa

- South Africa

Americas

- Argentina
- Brazil
- Canada
- Colombia
- United States

Asia

- China
- Iran
- Kazakhstan
- Singapore

Europe

- Croatia (hosts)
- Greece
- Germany
- Hungary
- Italy
- Montenegro
- Serbia
- Spain

Oceania

- Australia
- New Zealand

== Venue ==
The venue is the Bazen Mladost in Zagreb.

2025 World Aquatics Men's U20 Water Polo Championships is located in Croatia	Zagreb
2025 World Aquatics Men's U20 Water Polo Championships is located in Croatia	Bazen Mladost
2025 World Aquatics Men's U20 Water Polo Championships is located in Croatia	Capacity: 1,500

== Format ==
The 20 teams were divided into two divisions. The top eight teams made Division 1 and the other twelve teams Division 2. Division 1 were split into two groups of four teams while Division 2 was split into four groups of three. The top two teams from each group of Division 1 advanced directly to the quarterfinals, while the other two teams from each group played against one of the group winners from each group in Division 2 in the crossover round. Starting with quarterfinals onward, the regular knock-out system was used.

== Referees ==
On 30 April 2025, the following referees were announced as officiating the championship.

Region	Country	Referees
Africa	Egypt	Hatem Gaber
Africa	South Africa	Lucky Letshabo
Americas	Argentina	Jorge Agustin Pinski
Americas	Brazil	Felipe Giroldo
Americas	Canada	Martin Murray
Americas	Colombia	Jorge Patino Rincon
Americas	United States	Levon Dermendjian
Asia	China	Yang Pang
Asia	Iran	Shahrooz Sharifian
Asia	Kazakhstan	Viktor Salnichenko
Asia	Singapore	Jeremy Cheng

Region	Country	Referees
Europe	Croatia	Ante Bura
Europe	Greece	Georgios Polychronopoulos
Europe	Georgia	Levan Berishvili
Europe	Germany	Ralf Mueller
Europe	Hungary	Soma Kovacs
Europe	Italy	Alessandro Severo
Europe	Montenegro	Veselin Miskovic
Europe	Serbia	Rastko Prlic
Europe	Spain	Alex Marquez Mas
Oceania	Australia	Daniel Sava Bartels
Oceania	New Zealand	David Couper

== Group stage ==
The draw took place on 14 April 2025.

=== Division 1 ===
==== Group A ====
Pos	Team	Pld	W	PSW	PSL	L	GF	GA	GD	Pts	Qualification
1	Hungary	3	3	0	0	0	46	33	+13	9	Quarterfinals
2	Croatia (H)	3	2	0	0	1	45	39	+6	6	Quarterfinals
3	United States	3	1	0	0	2	38	42	−4	3	Crossover 2
4	Montenegro	3	0	0	0	3	34	49	−15	0	Crossover 2

Source: World Aquatics
Rules for classification: 1) points; 2) head-to-head points; 3) head-to-head goal difference; 4) head-to-head number of goals scored; 5) Goal difference.
(H) Host

14 June 2025; 16:30	Report	Hungary	18–10	Montenegro	Bazen Mladost, Zagreb; Referees: Rastko Prlic (SRB),Ralf Mueller (GER)
14 June 2025; 16:30	Report	Score by quarters: 4–3, 7–2, 4–3, 3–2			Bazen Mladost, Zagreb; Referees: Rastko Prlic (SRB),Ralf Mueller (GER)
14 June 2025; 16:30	Report	Leinweber 5	Goals	Stupar, Janovic 3	Bazen Mladost, Zagreb; Referees: Rastko Prlic (SRB),Ralf Mueller (GER)

14 June 2025; 18:00	Report	United States	10–19	Croatia	Bazen Mladost, Zagreb; Referees: Georgios Polychronopoulos (GRE), Daniel Sava Bartels (AUS)
14 June 2025; 18:00	Report	Score by quarters: 4–6, 2–2, 1–6, 3–5			Bazen Mladost, Zagreb; Referees: Georgios Polychronopoulos (GRE), Daniel Sava Bartels (AUS)
14 June 2025; 18:00	Report	Dodd 4	Goals	Jerkovic 5	Bazen Mladost, Zagreb; Referees: Georgios Polychronopoulos (GRE), Daniel Sava Bartels (AUS)

15 June 2025; 16:30	Report	United States	12–13	Hungary	Bazen Mladost, Zagreb; Referees: Alex Marquez Mas (ESP), Felipe Giroldo (BRA)
15 June 2025; 16:30	Report	Score by quarters: 3–2, 3–1, 2–6, 4–4			Bazen Mladost, Zagreb; Referees: Alex Marquez Mas (ESP), Felipe Giroldo (BRA)
15 June 2025; 16:30	Report	Dodd, Carcarey 3	Goals	Lugosi 3	Bazen Mladost, Zagreb; Referees: Alex Marquez Mas (ESP), Felipe Giroldo (BRA)

15 June 2025; 18:00	Report	Croatia	15–14	Montenegro	Bazen Mladost, Zagreb; Referees: Alessandro Severo (ITA), Yang Pang (CHN)
15 June 2025; 18:00	Report	Score by quarters: 5–5, 2–2, 5–5, 3–2			Bazen Mladost, Zagreb; Referees: Alessandro Severo (ITA), Yang Pang (CHN)
15 June 2025; 18:00	Report	Pavlić 8	Goals	Markovic 4	Bazen Mladost, Zagreb; Referees: Alessandro Severo (ITA), Yang Pang (CHN)

16 June 2025; 16:30	Report	United States	16–10	Montenegro	Bazen Mladost, Zagreb; Referees: Jeremy Cheng (SGP), Alex Marquez Mas (ESP)
16 June 2025; 16:30	Report	Score by quarters: 5–5, 4–1, 3–3, 4–1			Bazen Mladost, Zagreb; Referees: Jeremy Cheng (SGP), Alex Marquez Mas (ESP)
16 June 2025; 16:30	Report	Schneider 4	Goals	Perov, Markovic 2	Bazen Mladost, Zagreb; Referees: Jeremy Cheng (SGP), Alex Marquez Mas (ESP)

16 June 2025; 18:00	Report	Hungary	15–11	Croatia	Bazen Mladost, Zagreb; Referees: Jorge Agustin Pinski (ARG), Levan Berishvili (GEO)
16 June 2025; 18:00	Report	Score by quarters: 4–1, 3–2, 3–5, 5–3			Bazen Mladost, Zagreb; Referees: Jorge Agustin Pinski (ARG), Levan Berishvili (GEO)
16 June 2025; 18:00	Report	Balogh 4	Goals	Pavlić 4	Bazen Mladost, Zagreb; Referees: Jorge Agustin Pinski (ARG), Levan Berishvili (GEO)

==== Group B ====
Pos	Team	Pld	W	PSW	PSL	L	GF	GA	GD	Pts	Qualification
1	Spain	3	3	0	0	0	48	43	+5	9	Quarterfinals
2	Serbia	3	1	1	0	1	48	46	+2	5	Quarterfinals
3	Greece	3	1	0	1	1	46	47	−1	4	Crossover 2
4	Italy	3	0	0	0	3	43	49	−6	0	Crossover 2

Source: World Aquatics
Rules for classification: 1) points; 2) head-to-head points; 3) head-to-head goal difference; 4) head-to-head number of goals scored; 5) Goal difference.

14 June 2025; 15:00	Report	Greece	19–18	Italy	Bazen Mladost, Zagreb; Referees: Soma Kovacs (HUN), Viktor Salnichenko (KAZ)
14 June 2025; 15:00	Report	Score by quarters: 4–4, 5–2, 6–4, 4–8			Bazen Mladost, Zagreb; Referees: Soma Kovacs (HUN), Viktor Salnichenko (KAZ)
14 June 2025; 15:00	Report	Bitsakos 5	Goals	Gullotta 5	Bazen Mladost, Zagreb; Referees: Soma Kovacs (HUN), Viktor Salnichenko (KAZ)

14 June 2025; 19:30	Report	Serbia	13–14	Spain	Bazen Mladost, Zagreb; Referees: Veselin Miskovic (MNE), Lucky Letshabo (RSA)
14 June 2025; 19:30	Report	Score by quarters: 3–2, 3–4, 5–3, 2–5			Bazen Mladost, Zagreb; Referees: Veselin Miskovic (MNE), Lucky Letshabo (RSA)
14 June 2025; 19:30	Report	Krstic 5	Goals	Porcar, Faiges 3	Bazen Mladost, Zagreb; Referees: Veselin Miskovic (MNE), Lucky Letshabo (RSA)

15 June 2025; 15:00	Report	Greece	20–21	Serbia	Bazen Mladost, Zagreb; Referees: Ante Bura (CRO), David Couper (NZL)
15 June 2025; 15:00	Report	Score by quarters: 2–5, 6–2, 2–3, 3–3			Bazen Mladost, Zagreb; Referees: Ante Bura (CRO), David Couper (NZL)
15 June 2025; 15:00	Report	Georgaras 5	Goals	Krstic 5	Bazen Mladost, Zagreb; Referees: Ante Bura (CRO), David Couper (NZL)

15 June 2025; 19:30	Report	Italy	13–16	Spain	Bazen Mladost, Zagreb; Referees: Levon Dermendjian (USA), Levan Berishvili (GEO)
15 June 2025; 19:30	Report	Score by quarters: 3–3, 3–3, 4–3, 3–7			Bazen Mladost, Zagreb; Referees: Levon Dermendjian (USA), Levan Berishvili (GEO)
15 June 2025; 19:30	Report	Marini 4	Goals	Aguirre 5	Bazen Mladost, Zagreb; Referees: Levon Dermendjian (USA), Levan Berishvili (GEO)

16 June 2025; 15:00	Report	Serbia	14–12	Italy	Bazen Mladost, Zagreb; Referees: Levon Dermendjian (USA), Soma Kovacs (HUN)
16 June 2025; 15:00	Report	Score by quarters: 4–5, 4–3, 5–2, 1–2			Bazen Mladost, Zagreb; Referees: Levon Dermendjian (USA), Soma Kovacs (HUN)
16 June 2025; 15:00	Report	Gladovic 3	Goals	Cora 4	Bazen Mladost, Zagreb; Referees: Levon Dermendjian (USA), Soma Kovacs (HUN)

16 June 2025; 19:30	Report	Greece	17–18	Spain	Bazen Mladost, Zagreb; Referees: Daniel Sava Bartels (AUS), Veselin Miskovic (MNE)
16 June 2025; 19:30	Report	Score by quarters: 3–5, 5–5, 4–2, 5–6			Bazen Mladost, Zagreb; Referees: Daniel Sava Bartels (AUS), Veselin Miskovic (MNE)
16 June 2025; 19:30	Report	Spachits 5	Goals	Aguirre 7	Bazen Mladost, Zagreb; Referees: Daniel Sava Bartels (AUS), Veselin Miskovic (MNE)

=== Division 2 ===
==== Group C ====
Pos	Team	Pld	W	PSW	PSL	L	GF	GA	GD	Pts	Qualification
1	Germany	2	2	0	0	0	48	10	+38	6	Crossover 1
2	Brazil	2	1	0	0	1	34	24	+10	3	Classification round
3	South Africa	2	0	0	0	2	7	55	−48	0	Classification round

Source: World Aquatics
Rules for classification: 1) points; 2) head-to-head points; 3) head-to-head goal difference; 4) head-to-head number of goals scored; 5) Goal difference.

14 June 2025; 08:00	Report	Brazil	25–6	South Africa	Bazen Mladost, Zagreb; Referees: Jorge Agustin Pinkski (ARG), Martin Murray (CAN)
14 June 2025; 08:00	Report	Score by quarters: 7–2, 4–3, 7–1, 7–0			Bazen Mladost, Zagreb; Referees: Jorge Agustin Pinkski (ARG), Martin Murray (CAN)
14 June 2025; 08:00	Report	Wulfhorst 6	Goals	Field 2	Bazen Mladost, Zagreb; Referees: Jorge Agustin Pinkski (ARG), Martin Murray (CAN)

15 June 2025; 12:30	Report	Germany	30–1	South Africa	Bazen Mladost, Zagreb; Referees: Jorge Patino Rincon (COL), Martin Murray (CAN)
15 June 2025; 12:30	Report	Score by quarters: 3–1, 11–0, 5–0, 11–0			Bazen Mladost, Zagreb; Referees: Jorge Patino Rincon (COL), Martin Murray (CAN)
15 June 2025; 12:30	Report	Janke 4	Goals	Garreau 1	Bazen Mladost, Zagreb; Referees: Jorge Patino Rincon (COL), Martin Murray (CAN)

16 June 2025; 11:00	Report	Brazil	9–18	Germany	Bazen Mladost, Zagreb; Referees: Yang Pang (CHN), Georgios Polychronopoulos (GRE)
16 June 2025; 11:00	Report	Score by quarters: 2–5, 2–3, 2–4, 3–6			Bazen Mladost, Zagreb; Referees: Yang Pang (CHN), Georgios Polychronopoulos (GRE)
16 June 2025; 11:00	Report	Wulfhorst 3	Goals	Taubert 4	Bazen Mladost, Zagreb; Referees: Yang Pang (CHN), Georgios Polychronopoulos (GRE)

==== Group D ====
Pos	Team	Pld	W	PSW	PSL	L	GF	GA	GD	Pts	Qualification
1	Iran	2	2	0	0	0	31	22	+9	6	Crossover 1
2	Kazakhstan	2	1	0	0	1	21	27	−6	3	Classification round
3	New Zealand	2	0	0	0	2	24	27	−3	0	Classification round

Source: World Aquatics
Rules for classification: 1) points; 2) head-to-head points; 3) head-to-head goal difference; 4) head-to-head number of goals scored; 5) Goal difference.

14 June 2025; 09:30	Report	Kazakhstan	12–11	New Zealand	Bazen Mladost, Zagreb; Referees: Jeremy Cheng (SGP), Jorge Patino Rincon (COL)
14 June 2025; 09:30	Report	Score by quarters: 1–0, 3–2, 4–5, 4–4			Bazen Mladost, Zagreb; Referees: Jeremy Cheng (SGP), Jorge Patino Rincon (COL)
14 June 2025; 09:30	Report	Akimbay 4	Goals	Phillips 3	Bazen Mladost, Zagreb; Referees: Jeremy Cheng (SGP), Jorge Patino Rincon (COL)

15 June 2025; 08:00	Report	Iran	15–13	New Zealand	Bazen Mladost, Zagreb; Referees: Daniel Sava Bartels (AUS), Jorge Agustin Pinski (ARG)
15 June 2025; 08:00	Report	Score by quarters: 6–3, 3–4, 2–3, 4–3			Bazen Mladost, Zagreb; Referees: Daniel Sava Bartels (AUS), Jorge Agustin Pinski (ARG)
15 June 2025; 08:00	Report	Shams 8	Goals	Rodgers 3	Bazen Mladost, Zagreb; Referees: Daniel Sava Bartels (AUS), Jorge Agustin Pinski (ARG)

16 June 2025; 12:30	Report	Kazakhstan	9–16	Iran	Bazen Mladost, Zagreb; Referees: Martin Murray (CAN), Alessandro Severo (ITA)
16 June 2025; 12:30	Report	Score by quarters: 1–1, 2–7, 3–4, 3–4			Bazen Mladost, Zagreb; Referees: Martin Murray (CAN), Alessandro Severo (ITA)
16 June 2025; 12:30	Report	Madimar 5	Goals	Golestanirad 4	Bazen Mladost, Zagreb; Referees: Martin Murray (CAN), Alessandro Severo (ITA)

==== Group E ====
Pos	Team	Pld	W	PSW	PSL	L	GF	GA	GD	Pts	Qualification
1	Australia	2	2	0	0	0	35	22	+13	6	Crossover 1
2	Argentina	2	1	0	0	1	24	24	0	3	Classification round
3	Colombia	2	0	0	0	2	16	29	−13	0	Classification round

Source: World Aquatics
Rules for classification: 1) points; 2) head-to-head points; 3) head-to-head goal difference; 4) head-to-head number of goals scored; 5) Goal difference.

14 June 2025; 11:00	Report	Colombia	11–16	Australia	Bazen Mladost, Zagreb; Referees: Hatem Gaber (EGY), Felipe Giroldo (BRA)
14 June 2025; 11:00	Report	Score by quarters: 2–1, 2–6, 3–6, 4–3			Bazen Mladost, Zagreb; Referees: Hatem Gaber (EGY), Felipe Giroldo (BRA)
14 June 2025; 11:00	Report	Zuluaga Moreno 5	Goals	Zachary 4	Bazen Mladost, Zagreb; Referees: Hatem Gaber (EGY), Felipe Giroldo (BRA)

15 June 2025; 09:30	Report	Argentina	11–19	Australia	Bazen Mladost, Zagreb; Referees: Shahrooz Sharifian (IRN), Viktor Salnichenko (KAZ)
15 June 2025; 09:30	Report	Score by quarters: 1–2, 4–5, 4–6, 2–6			Bazen Mladost, Zagreb; Referees: Shahrooz Sharifian (IRN), Viktor Salnichenko (KAZ)
15 June 2025; 09:30	Report	Teijeiro 6	Goals	Stewart, Magasanik 4	Bazen Mladost, Zagreb; Referees: Shahrooz Sharifian (IRN), Viktor Salnichenko (KAZ)

16 June 2025; 08:00	Report	Colombia	5–13	Argentina	Bazen Mladost, Zagreb; Referees: Ralf Mueller (GER), Ante Bura (CRO)
16 June 2025; 08:00	Report	Score by quarters: 1–2, 1–6, 1–2, 2–3			Bazen Mladost, Zagreb; Referees: Ralf Mueller (GER), Ante Bura (CRO)
16 June 2025; 08:00	Report	Arias 2	Goals	Tejeiro, Rivera 3	Bazen Mladost, Zagreb; Referees: Ralf Mueller (GER), Ante Bura (CRO)

==== Group F ====
Pos	Team	Pld	W	PSW	PSL	L	GF	GA	GD	Pts	Qualification
1	China	2	2	0	0	0	26	20	+6	6	Crossover 1
2	Canada	2	1	0	0	1	32	19	+13	3	Classification round
3	Singapore	2	0	0	0	2	14	33	−19	0	Classification round

Source: World Aquatics
Rules for classification: 1) points; 2) head-to-head points; 3) head-to-head goal difference; 4) head-to-head number of goals scored; 5) Goal difference.

14 June 2025; 12:30	Report	Canada	20–6	Singapore	Bazen Mladost, Zagreb; Referees: Shahrooz Sharifian (IRN), David Couper (NZL)
14 June 2025; 12:30	Report	Score by quarters: 5–2, 4–0, 4–1, 7–3			Bazen Mladost, Zagreb; Referees: Shahrooz Sharifian (IRN), David Couper (NZL)
14 June 2025; 12:30	Report	Marquez 4	Goals	six players 1	Bazen Mladost, Zagreb; Referees: Shahrooz Sharifian (IRN), David Couper (NZL)

15 June 2025; 11:00	Report	China	13–8	Singapore	Bazen Mladost, Zagreb; Referees: Lucky Letshabo (RSA), Ralf Mueller (GER)
15 June 2025; 11:00	Report	Score by quarters: 3–2, 7–1, 3–3, 0–2			Bazen Mladost, Zagreb; Referees: Lucky Letshabo (RSA), Ralf Mueller (GER)
15 June 2025; 11:00	Report	Wanxiang, Ouyang, Cai 3	Goals	Goh 3	Bazen Mladost, Zagreb; Referees: Lucky Letshabo (RSA), Ralf Mueller (GER)

16 June 2025; 09:30	Report	Canada	12–13	China	Bazen Mladost, Zagreb; Referees: Rastko Prlic (SRB), Hatem Gaber (EGY)
16 June 2025; 09:30	Report	Score by quarters: 1–3, 4–5, 5–2, 2–3			Bazen Mladost, Zagreb; Referees: Rastko Prlic (SRB), Hatem Gaber (EGY)
16 June 2025; 09:30	Report	Marquez 5	Goals	Y. Yang	Bazen Mladost, Zagreb; Referees: Rastko Prlic (SRB), Hatem Gaber (EGY)

== Classification round ==
=== Group G ===
Pos	Team	Pld	W	PSW	PSL	L	GF	GA	GD	Pts	Qualification
1	Brazil	3	3	0	0	0	46	29	+17	9	13th place match
2	Argentina	3	2	0	0	1	37	36	+1	6	15th place match
3	Singapore	3	1	0	0	2	38	44	−6	3	17th place match
4	New Zealand	3	0	0	0	3	30	42	−12	0	19th place match

Source: World Aquatics
Rules for classification: 1) points; 2) head-to-head points; 3) head-to-head goal difference; 4) head-to-head number of goals scored; 5) Goal difference.

17 June 2025; 08:00	Report	Brazil	14–8	New Zealand	Bazen Mladost, Zagreb; Referees: Jorge Patino Rincon (COL), Lucky Letshabo (RSA)
17 June 2025; 08:00	Report	Score by quarters: 4–2, 5–1, 4–2, 1–3			Bazen Mladost, Zagreb; Referees: Jorge Patino Rincon (COL), Lucky Letshabo (RSA)
17 June 2025; 08:00	Report	Romanholi, Diaz, Wulfhorst 3	Goals	Keshvara, Schuler 2	Bazen Mladost, Zagreb; Referees: Jorge Patino Rincon (COL), Lucky Letshabo (RSA)

17 June 2025; 09:30	Report	Argentina	14–12	Singapore	Bazen Mladost, Zagreb; Referees: Viktor Salnichenko (KAZ), Hatem Gaber (EGY)
17 June 2025; 09:30	Report	Score by quarters: 6–5, 3–4, 4–0, 1–3			Bazen Mladost, Zagreb; Referees: Viktor Salnichenko (KAZ), Hatem Gaber (EGY)
17 June 2025; 09:30	Report	Deluca, Tejeiro 3	Goals	Ong 5	Bazen Mladost, Zagreb; Referees: Viktor Salnichenko (KAZ), Hatem Gaber (EGY)

18 June 2025; 08:00	Report	Argentina	8–14	Brazil	Bazen Mladost, Zagreb; Referees: Martin Murray (CAN), Alessandro Severo (ITA)
18 June 2025; 08:00	Report	Score by quarters: 3–6, 0–0, 0–3, 5–5			Bazen Mladost, Zagreb; Referees: Martin Murray (CAN), Alessandro Severo (ITA)
18 June 2025; 08:00	Report	Teijeiro 3	Goals	Martinelli, Martins 3	Bazen Mladost, Zagreb; Referees: Martin Murray (CAN), Alessandro Severo (ITA)

18 June 2025; 09:30	Report	Singapore	13–12	New Zealand	Bazen Mladost, Zagreb; Referees: Jorge Patino Rincon (COL), Veselin Miskovic (MNE)
18 June 2025; 09:30	Report	Score by quarters: 3–1, 1–3, 5–4, 4–4			Bazen Mladost, Zagreb; Referees: Jorge Patino Rincon (COL), Veselin Miskovic (MNE)
18 June 2025; 09:30	Report	Ong 4	Goals	Rodgers 4	Bazen Mladost, Zagreb; Referees: Jorge Patino Rincon (COL), Veselin Miskovic (MNE)

19 June 2025; 08:00	Report	Brazil	18–13	Singapore	Bazen Mladost, Zagreb; Referees: Lucky Letshabo (RSA), Levan Berishvili (GEO)
19 June 2025; 08:00	Report	Score by quarters: 6–3, 3–2, 4–3, 5–5			Bazen Mladost, Zagreb; Referees: Lucky Letshabo (RSA), Levan Berishvili (GEO)
19 June 2025; 08:00	Report	Diaz, Da Silva 4	Goals	Gom, Ong 4	Bazen Mladost, Zagreb; Referees: Lucky Letshabo (RSA), Levan Berishvili (GEO)

19 June 2025; 09:30	Report	Argentina	15–10	New Zealand	Bazen Mladost, Zagreb; Referees: Viktor Salnichenko (KAZ), Rastko Prlic (SRB)
19 June 2025; 09:30	Report	Score by quarters: 4–2, 2–1, 6–4, 3–3			Bazen Mladost, Zagreb; Referees: Viktor Salnichenko (KAZ), Rastko Prlic (SRB)
19 June 2025; 09:30	Report	Conti 5	Goals	Rodgers 4	Bazen Mladost, Zagreb; Referees: Viktor Salnichenko (KAZ), Rastko Prlic (SRB)

=== Group H ===
Pos	Team	Pld	W	PSW	PSL	L	GF	GA	GD	Pts	Qualification
1	Canada	3	3	0	0	0	53	32	+21	9	13th place match
2	Kazakhstan	3	2	0	0	1	33	34	−1	6	15th place match
3	Colombia	3	1	0	0	2	45	40	+5	3	17th place match
4	South Africa	3	0	0	0	3	24	49	−25	0	19th place match

Source: World Aquatics
Rules for classification: 1) points; 2) head-to-head points; 3) head-to-head goal difference; 4) head-to-head number of goals scored; 5) Goal difference.

17 June 2025; 15:00	Report	South Africa	6–7	Kazakhstan	Bazen Mladost, Zagreb; Referees: Jorge Agustin Pinski (ARG), Jeremy Cheng (SGP)
17 June 2025; 15:00	Report	Score by quarters: 0–1, 2–2, 4–4, 0–0			Bazen Mladost, Zagreb; Referees: Jorge Agustin Pinski (ARG), Jeremy Cheng (SGP)
17 June 2025; 15:00	Report	Smith, Young 2	Goals	Madimar 3	Bazen Mladost, Zagreb; Referees: Jorge Agustin Pinski (ARG), Jeremy Cheng (SGP)

17 June 2025; 16:30	Report	Colombia	11–17	Canada	Bazen Mladost, Zagreb; Referees: Shahrooz Sharifian (IRN), David Couper (NZL)
17 June 2025; 16:30	Report	Score by quarters: 2–3, 3–6, 2–3, 4–5			Bazen Mladost, Zagreb; Referees: Shahrooz Sharifian (IRN), David Couper (NZL)
17 June 2025; 16:30	Report	Jaramillo 4	Goals	Hachem 4	Bazen Mladost, Zagreb; Referees: Shahrooz Sharifian (IRN), David Couper (NZL)

18 June 2025; 11:00	Report	Colombia	21–8	South Africa	Bazen Mladost, Zagreb; Referees: Shahrooz Sharifian (IRN), Levon Dermendjian (USA)
18 June 2025; 11:00	Report	Score by quarters: 5–2, 4–4, 6–0, 6–2			Bazen Mladost, Zagreb; Referees: Shahrooz Sharifian (IRN), Levon Dermendjian (USA)
18 June 2025; 11:00	Report	Quintero, Jaramillo 3	Goals	Young, Flinn, Pearce 2	Bazen Mladost, Zagreb; Referees: Shahrooz Sharifian (IRN), Levon Dermendjian (USA)

18 June 2025; 12:30	Report	Canada	15–11	Kazakhstan	Bazen Mladost, Zagreb; Referees: Hatem Gaber (EGY), Daniel Sava Bartels (AUS)
18 June 2025; 12:30	Report	Score by quarters: 3–2, 5–5, 4–3, 3–1			Bazen Mladost, Zagreb; Referees: Hatem Gaber (EGY), Daniel Sava Bartels (AUS)
18 June 2025; 12:30	Report	Kharmastov, Hachem 3	Goals	Akimbay 4	Bazen Mladost, Zagreb; Referees: Hatem Gaber (EGY), Daniel Sava Bartels (AUS)

19 June 2025; 11:00	Report	South Africa	10–21	Canada	Bazen Mladost, Zagreb; Referees: Jeremy Cheng (SGP), Jorge Agustin Pinski (ARG)
19 June 2025; 11:00	Report	Score by quarters: 3–4, 1–7, 3–5, 3–5			Bazen Mladost, Zagreb; Referees: Jeremy Cheng (SGP), Jorge Agustin Pinski (ARG)
19 June 2025; 11:00	Report	Garreau, Field 3	Goals	Marquez 5	Bazen Mladost, Zagreb; Referees: Jeremy Cheng (SGP), Jorge Agustin Pinski (ARG)

19 June 2025; 12:30	Report	Colombia	13–15	Kazakhstan	Bazen Mladost, Zagreb; Referees: Yang Pang (CHN), Hatem Gaber (EGY)
19 June 2025; 12:30	Report	Score by quarters: 1–3, 3–5, 5–5, 4–2			Bazen Mladost, Zagreb; Referees: Yang Pang (CHN), Hatem Gaber (EGY)
19 June 2025; 12:30	Report	Zuluaga Moreno 4	Goals	Akimbay 5	Bazen Mladost, Zagreb; Referees: Yang Pang (CHN), Hatem Gaber (EGY)

=== Placement matches ===
==== Thirteenth place game ====
21 June 2025; 09:30	Report	Brazil	17–8	Canada	Bazen Mladost, Zagreb; Referees: Alessandro Severo (ITA), Viktor Salnichenko (KAZ)
21 June 2025; 09:30	Report	Score by quarters: 4–2, 5–1, 3–3, 5–2			Bazen Mladost, Zagreb; Referees: Alessandro Severo (ITA), Viktor Salnichenko (KAZ)
21 June 2025; 09:30	Report	Wulfhorst 4	Goals	Marquez 3	Bazen Mladost, Zagreb; Referees: Alessandro Severo (ITA), Viktor Salnichenko (KAZ)

==== Fifteenth place game ====
21 June 2025; 08:00	Report	Argentina	14–7	Kazakhstan	Bazen Mladost, Zagreb; Referees: Lucky Letshabo (RSA), Felipe Giroldo (BRA)
21 June 2025; 08:00	Report	Score by quarters: 5–2, 2–0, 3–2, 4–3			Bazen Mladost, Zagreb; Referees: Lucky Letshabo (RSA), Felipe Giroldo (BRA)
21 June 2025; 08:00	Report	Teijeiro 5	Goals	Akimbay, Madimar 2	Bazen Mladost, Zagreb; Referees: Lucky Letshabo (RSA), Felipe Giroldo (BRA)

==== Seventeenth place game ====
20 June 2025; 09:30	Report	Singapore	18–21 (PSO)	Colombia	Bazen Mladost, Zagreb; Referees: Martin Murray (CAN), Levon Dermandjian (USA)
20 June 2025; 09:30	Report	Score by quarters: 5–5, 6–2, 3–7, 3–3 PSO: 1–4			Bazen Mladost, Zagreb; Referees: Martin Murray (CAN), Levon Dermandjian (USA)
20 June 2025; 09:30	Report	Ong 6	Goals	Zuluaga Moreno, Olano 6	Bazen Mladost, Zagreb; Referees: Martin Murray (CAN), Levon Dermandjian (USA)

==== Nineteenth place game ====
20 June 2025; 08:00	Report	New Zealand	15–16 (PSO)	South Africa	Bazen Mladost, Zagreb; Referees: Shahrooz Sharifian (IRN), Viktor Salnichenko (KAZ)
20 June 2025; 08:00	Report	Score by quarters: 3–3, 3–4, 4–3, 3–3 PSO: 2–3			Bazen Mladost, Zagreb; Referees: Shahrooz Sharifian (IRN), Viktor Salnichenko (KAZ)
20 June 2025; 08:00	Report	Phillips 5	Goals	Young 5	Bazen Mladost, Zagreb; Referees: Shahrooz Sharifian (IRN), Viktor Salnichenko (KAZ)

== Knockout stage ==
=== Crossover 1 ===
The four advancing teams from Division 2 played each in a crossover match. The winners of both ties play a fourth place team while the losers play a team that placed third.

17 June 2025; 18:00	Report	Iran	6–22	Germany	Bazen Mladost, Zagreb; Referees: Yang Pang (CHN), Rastko Prlic (SRB)
17 June 2025; 18:00	Report	Score by quarters: 0–4, 2–6, 1–6, 3–6			Bazen Mladost, Zagreb; Referees: Yang Pang (CHN), Rastko Prlic (SRB)
17 June 2025; 18:00	Report	Shams 3	Goals	Hoffman 4	Bazen Mladost, Zagreb; Referees: Yang Pang (CHN), Rastko Prlic (SRB)

17 June 2025; 19:30	Report	Australia	19–8	China	Bazen Mladost, Zagreb; Referees: Ralf Mueller (GER), Felipe Giroldo (BRA)
17 June 2025; 19:30	Report	Score by quarters: 5–3, 9–1, 4–1, 1–3			Bazen Mladost, Zagreb; Referees: Ralf Mueller (GER), Felipe Giroldo (BRA)
17 June 2025; 19:30	Report	Magasanik 5	Goals	Huang, C. Li 2	Bazen Mladost, Zagreb; Referees: Ralf Mueller (GER), Felipe Giroldo (BRA)

=== Brackets ===
==== Main bracket ====
Crossover 2
18 June
Australia	6
Italy	17
18 June
Germany	10
Montenegro	11
18 June
China	6
Greece	27
18 June
Iran	5
United States	23

Quarterfinals
19 June
Hungary	13
Italy	10
19 June
Spain	23
Montenegro	9
19 June
Croatia	14
Greece	11
19 June
Serbia	14 (4)
United States	14 (5)

Semifinals
20 June
Hungary	16
United States	18
20 June
Spain	13
Croatia	11

Final
21 June
United States	11
Spain	14
Third place game
21 June
Hungary	8
Croatia	13

=== Crossover 2 ===
18 June 2025; 15:00	Report	Iran	5–23	United States	Bazen Mladost, Zagreb; Referees: David Couper (NZL), Ante Bura (CRO)
18 June 2025; 15:00	Report	Score by quarters: 1–7, 1–5, 0–3, 3–8			Bazen Mladost, Zagreb; Referees: David Couper (NZL), Ante Bura (CRO)
18 June 2025; 15:00	Report	five players 1	Goals	Stanley 4	Bazen Mladost, Zagreb; Referees: David Couper (NZL), Ante Bura (CRO)

18 June 2025; 16:30	Report	China	6–27	Greece	Bazen Mladost, Zagreb; Referees: Felipe Giroldo (BRA), Soma Kovacs (HUN)
18 June 2025; 16:30	Report	Score by quarters: 2–5, 0–8, 2–6, 2–8			Bazen Mladost, Zagreb; Referees: Felipe Giroldo (BRA), Soma Kovacs (HUN)
18 June 2025; 16:30	Report	six players 1	Goals	Angelopoulos 6	Bazen Mladost, Zagreb; Referees: Felipe Giroldo (BRA), Soma Kovacs (HUN)

18 June 2025; 18:00	Report	Germany	10–11	Montenegro	Bazen Mladost, Zagreb; Referees: Rastko Prlic (SRB), Georgios Polychronopoulos (GRE)
18 June 2025; 18:00	Report	Score by quarters: 2–3, 4–4, 1–2, 3–2			Bazen Mladost, Zagreb; Referees: Rastko Prlic (SRB), Georgios Polychronopoulos (GRE)
18 June 2025; 18:00	Report	Hofmann 3	Goals	Matijasveic, Nikaljevic, Perov 2	Bazen Mladost, Zagreb; Referees: Rastko Prlic (SRB), Georgios Polychronopoulos (GRE)

18 June 2025; 19:30	Report	Australia	6–17	Italy	Bazen Mladost, Zagreb; Referees: Levan Berishvili (GEO), Alex Marquez Mas (ESP)
18 June 2025; 19:30	Report	Score by quarters: 1–3, 3–4, 1–6, 1–4			Bazen Mladost, Zagreb; Referees: Levan Berishvili (GEO), Alex Marquez Mas (ESP)
18 June 2025; 19:30	Report	Tucker 2	Goals	Giacomone, Lo Re 4	Bazen Mladost, Zagreb; Referees: Levan Berishvili (GEO), Alex Marquez Mas (ESP)

=== Quarterfinals ===
19 June 2025; 15:00	Report	Hungary	13–10	Italy	Bazen Mladost, Zagreb; Referees: Alex Marquez Mas (ESP), Ante Bura (CRO)
19 June 2025; 15:00	Report	Score by quarters: 4–3, 2–2, 5–3, 2–2			Bazen Mladost, Zagreb; Referees: Alex Marquez Mas (ESP), Ante Bura (CRO)
19 June 2025; 15:00	Report	Leinweber 5	Goals	Gulloata, Giacomone 2	Bazen Mladost, Zagreb; Referees: Alex Marquez Mas (ESP), Ante Bura (CRO)

19 June 2025; 16:30	Report	Spain	23–9	Montenegro	Bazen Mladost, Zagreb; Referees: Soma Kovacs (HUN), Ralf Mueller (GER)
19 June 2025; 16:30	Report	Score by quarters: 5–2, 8–4, 4–0, 6–3			Bazen Mladost, Zagreb; Referees: Soma Kovacs (HUN), Ralf Mueller (GER)
19 June 2025; 16:30	Report	Flaque, Perrone 4	Goals	Stupar 3	Bazen Mladost, Zagreb; Referees: Soma Kovacs (HUN), Ralf Mueller (GER)

19 June 2025; 18:00	Report	Croatia	14–11	Greece	Bazen Mladost, Zagreb; Referees: Alessandro Severo (ITA), Levon Dermendjian (USA)
19 June 2025; 18:00	Report	Score by quarters: 2–5, 1–2, 5–1, 6–3			Bazen Mladost, Zagreb; Referees: Alessandro Severo (ITA), Levon Dermendjian (USA)
19 June 2025; 18:00	Report	Toncinic 4	Goals	Chatzis 4	Bazen Mladost, Zagreb; Referees: Alessandro Severo (ITA), Levon Dermendjian (USA)

19 June 2025; 19:30	Report	Serbia	18–19 (PSO)	United States	Bazen Mladost, Zagreb; Referees: Georgios Polychronnpoulos (GRE), Veselin Miskovic (MNE)
19 June 2025; 19:30	Report	Score by quarters: 4–4, 2–5, 3–2, 5–3 PSO: 4–5			Bazen Mladost, Zagreb; Referees: Georgios Polychronnpoulos (GRE), Veselin Miskovic (MNE)
19 June 2025; 19:30	Report	Dokanovic 3	Goals	Dodd 8	Bazen Mladost, Zagreb; Referees: Georgios Polychronnpoulos (GRE), Veselin Miskovic (MNE)

=== Semifinals ===
20 June 2025; 18:00	Report	Hungary	16–18	United States	Bazen Mladost, Zagreb; Referees: Georgios Polychronnpoulos (GRE), Veselin Miskovic (MNE)
20 June 2025; 18:00	Report	Score by quarters: 5–4, 5–5, 3–3, 3–6			Bazen Mladost, Zagreb; Referees: Georgios Polychronnpoulos (GRE), Veselin Miskovic (MNE)
20 June 2025; 18:00	Report	Leinweber 7	Goals	Dodd 6	Bazen Mladost, Zagreb; Referees: Georgios Polychronnpoulos (GRE), Veselin Miskovic (MNE)

20 June 2025; 19:30	Report	Spain	13–11	Croatia	Bazen Mladost, Zagreb; Referees: Alessandro Severo (ITA), Daniel Sava Bartels (AUS)
20 June 2025; 19:30	Report	Score by quarters: 5–3, 1–3, 2–3, 5–2			Bazen Mladost, Zagreb; Referees: Alessandro Severo (ITA), Daniel Sava Bartels (AUS)
20 June 2025; 19:30	Report	Aguirre 5	Goals	Pavlić 6	Bazen Mladost, Zagreb; Referees: Alessandro Severo (ITA), Daniel Sava Bartels (AUS)

==== Third place game ====
21 June 2025; 18:00	Report	Hungary	8–13	Croatia	Bazen Mladost, Zagreb; Referees: Alex Marquez Mas (ESP), Levon Dermendjian (USA)
21 June 2025; 18:00	Report	Score by quarters: 2–4, 2–4, 1–2, 3–3			Bazen Mladost, Zagreb; Referees: Alex Marquez Mas (ESP), Levon Dermendjian (USA)
21 June 2025; 18:00	Report	Cseh 3	Goals	Penava, Pavlić 4	Bazen Mladost, Zagreb; Referees: Alex Marquez Mas (ESP), Levon Dermendjian (USA)

==== Final ====
21 June 2025; 19:30	Report	United States	11–14	Spain	Bazen Mladost, Zagreb; Referees: Daniel Sava Bartels (AUS), Veselin Midkovic (MNE)
21 June 2025; 19:30	Report	Score by quarters: 1–3, 6–2, 1–3, 3–6			Bazen Mladost, Zagreb; Referees: Daniel Sava Bartels (AUS), Veselin Midkovic (MNE)
21 June 2025; 19:30	Report	Ohl 3	Goals	Porcar 6	Bazen Mladost, Zagreb; Referees: Daniel Sava Bartels (AUS), Veselin Midkovic (MNE)

=== 5th place bracket ===
5th–8th place semifinals
20 June
Italy	16
Serbia	21
20 June
Montenegro	13 (8)
Greece	13 (7)

Fifth place game
21 June
Serbia	21
Montenegro	14
Seventh place game
21 June
Italy	10
Greece	12

=== 5th–8th place semifinals ===
20 June 2025; 15:00	Report	Italy	16–21	Serbia	Bazen Mladost, Zagreb; Referees: Soma Kovacs (HUN), Ante Bura (CRO)
20 June 2025; 15:00	Report	Score by quarters: 3–4, 3–4, 5–6, 5–7			Bazen Mladost, Zagreb; Referees: Soma Kovacs (HUN), Ante Bura (CRO)
20 June 2025; 15:00	Report	Giacomone, Tringali, Cora 4	Goals	Novakovic 5	Bazen Mladost, Zagreb; Referees: Soma Kovacs (HUN), Ante Bura (CRO)

19 June 2025; 16:30	Report	Montenegro	21–20 (PSO)	Greece	Bazen Mladost, Zagreb; Referees: Yang Pang (CHN), Alex Marquez Mas (ESP)
19 June 2025; 16:30	Report	Score by quarters: 3–2, 3–4, 5–5, 2–2 PSO: 8–7			Bazen Mladost, Zagreb; Referees: Yang Pang (CHN), Alex Marquez Mas (ESP)
19 June 2025; 16:30	Report	Janovic 4	Goals	Bitsakos 4	Bazen Mladost, Zagreb; Referees: Yang Pang (CHN), Alex Marquez Mas (ESP)

==== Seventh place game ====
21 June 2025; 15:00	Report	Italy	10–12	Greece	Bazen Mladost, Zagreb; Referees: Ralf Mueller (GER), Rastko Prlic (SRB)
21 June 2025; 15:00	Report	Score by quarters: 2–4, 3–2, 1–4, 4–2			Bazen Mladost, Zagreb; Referees: Ralf Mueller (GER), Rastko Prlic (SRB)
21 June 2025; 15:00	Report	Giacomone 3	Goals	three players 3	Bazen Mladost, Zagreb; Referees: Ralf Mueller (GER), Rastko Prlic (SRB)

==== Fifth place game ====
21 June 2025; 16:30	Report	Serbia	21–14	Montenegro	Bazen Mladost, Zagreb; Referees: Yang Pang (CHN), Georgios Polychronnpoulos (GRE)
21 June 2025; 16:30	Report	Score by quarters: 6–5, 5–3, 6–4, 4–2			Bazen Mladost, Zagreb; Referees: Yang Pang (CHN), Georgios Polychronnpoulos (GRE)
21 June 2025; 16:30	Report	Kojic 4	Goals	Stupar 6	Bazen Mladost, Zagreb; Referees: Yang Pang (CHN), Georgios Polychronnpoulos (GRE)

=== 9th place bracket ===
9th–12th place semifinals
20 June
Iran	13
Australia	17
20 June
China	2
Germany	20

Ninth place game
21 June
Australia	12
Germany	13
Eleventh place game
21 June
Iran	11
China	13

=== 9th–12th place semifinals ===
20 June 2025; 11:00	Report	Iran	13–17	Australia	Bazen Mladost, Zagreb; Referees: Jeremy Cheng (SGP), Jorge Patino Rincon (COL)
20 June 2025; 11:00	Report	Score by quarters: 2–5, 2–4, 5–3, 4–5			Bazen Mladost, Zagreb; Referees: Jeremy Cheng (SGP), Jorge Patino Rincon (COL)
20 June 2025; 11:00	Report	Shams 4	Goals	Tucker, Magasanik 4	Bazen Mladost, Zagreb; Referees: Jeremy Cheng (SGP), Jorge Patino Rincon (COL)

20 June 2025; 12:30	Report	China	2–20	Germany	Bazen Mladost, Zagreb; Referees: David Couper (NZL), Felipe Giroldo (BRA)
20 June 2025; 12:30	Report	Score by quarters: 1–8, 0–3, 1–5, 0–4			Bazen Mladost, Zagreb; Referees: David Couper (NZL), Felipe Giroldo (BRA)
20 June 2025; 12:30	Report	Huang, Tang 1	Goals	Simic, Hofmann 4	Bazen Mladost, Zagreb; Referees: David Couper (NZL), Felipe Giroldo (BRA)

==== Eleventh place game ====
21 June 2025; 11:00	Report	Iran	11–13	China	Bazen Mladost, Zagreb; Referees: Soma Kovacs (HUN), Hatem Gaber (EGY)
21 June 2025; 11:00	Report	Score by quarters: 2–3, 2–1, 3–6, 4–3			Bazen Mladost, Zagreb; Referees: Soma Kovacs (HUN), Hatem Gaber (EGY)
21 June 2025; 11:00	Report	Shams 6	Goals	Wanxiang 3	Bazen Mladost, Zagreb; Referees: Soma Kovacs (HUN), Hatem Gaber (EGY)

==== Ninth place game ====
21 June 2025; 12:30	Report	Australia	12–13	Germany	Bazen Mladost, Zagreb; Referees: Jorge Agustin Pinski (ARG), Ante Bura (CRO)
21 June 2025; 12:30	Report	Score by quarters: 3–3, 1–4, 3–3, 5–3			Bazen Mladost, Zagreb; Referees: Jorge Agustin Pinski (ARG), Ante Bura (CRO)
21 June 2025; 12:30	Report	Brown, Martin 3	Goals	Taubert 4	Bazen Mladost, Zagreb; Referees: Jorge Agustin Pinski (ARG), Ante Bura (CRO)

== Final standings ==
Rank	Team
1st place, gold medalist(s)	Spain
2nd place, silver medalist(s)	United States
3rd place, bronze medalist(s)	Croatia
4	Hungary
5	Serbia
6	Montenegro
7	Greece
8	Italy
9	Germany
10	Australia
11	China
12	Iran
13	Brazil
14	Canada
15	Argentina
16	Kazakhstan
17	Colombia
18	Singapore
19	South Africa
20	New Zealand

== Awards ==
Position	Player
MVP	(United States) Ryder Dodd
Top scorer	(Croatia) Vlaho Pavlić (30 goals)
Best Goalkeeper	(Spain) Aran Pina

=== All star Team ===
Position	Player
Goalkeeper	(Spain) Aran Pina
Centre Forward	(Greece) Semir Spachits
Field Players	(Spain) Oier Aguirre
Field Players	(United States) Ryder Dodd
Field Players	(Greece) Apostolos Georgaras
Field Players	(Hungary) Oliver Leinweber
Field Players	(Croatia) Vlaho Pavlić

== Squads ==
- Croatia (host): Mauro Ivan Čubranić, Mauro Prkoča, Ante Jerković, Maro Šušić, Dominik Obuljen, Gabrijel Burburan, Ivuša Burđelez, Karlo Dragošević, Amar Fajković, Luka Penava, Viktor Tončinić, Vlaho Pavlić, Jakov Ćosić, Mislav Čurković, Jan Bušić. Selector: Zoran Bajić.
