= United States women's national junior water polo team =

- FINA code: USA
- Association: USA Water Polo
- Confederation: UANA (Americas)
- Head coach: Ethan Damato

U20 World Championship
- Appearances: 15 (first in 1995)
- Best result: (2001, 2005, 2013, 2015, 2025)

U19 Pan American Championship
- Appearances: 1 (first in 2026)
- Best result: (2026)

Media
- Website: usawaterpolo.org
Medal record
Women's water polo
U20 World Championship
| Gold medal – first place | 2001 Perth | Team |
| Gold medal – first place | 2005 Perth | Team |
| Gold medal – first place | 2013 Volos | Team |
| Gold medal – first place | 2015 Volos | Team |
| Gold medal – first place | 2025 Salvador | Team |
| Silver medal – second place | 2003 Calgary | Team |
| Bronze medal – third place | 1995 Sainte-Foy, Quebec | Team |
| Bronze medal – third place | 1997 Prague | Team |
| Bronze medal – third place | 2009 Khanty-Mansiysk | Team |
U19 Pan American Championship
| Gold medal – first place | 2026 Bauru | Team |
- Last updated: October 4, 2026

The United States women's national junior water polo team represents the United States in women's World Aquatics U20 Water Polo Championships. It is an international water polo tournament held every two years for the players under the age of 20.

== Results ==
=== Major tournaments ===
==== Competitive record ====
Updated after the 2026 Pan American U19 Water Polo Championship – Women's tournament.

| Tournament | Appearances | Finishes | | | | |
| Tournament | Appearances | Champions | Runners-up | Third place | Fourth place | Total |
|---|---|---|---|---|---|---|
| U20 World Championship | 15 | 5 | 1 | 3 | 1 | 10 |
| U19 Pan American Championship | 1 | 1 | 0 | 0 | 0 | 1 |
| Total | 16 | 6 | 1 | 3 | 1 | 11 |

==== U20 World Championship ====
| Year | Result | Pld | W | L | D |
|---|---|---|---|---|---|
| (Canada) 1995 | Bronze medal | 5 | 4 | 1 | 0 |
| (Czech Republic) 1997 | Bronze medal | 8 | 6 | 2 | 0 |
| (Italy) 1999 | 5th place | 8 | 6 | 2 | 0 |
| (Australia) 2001 | Gold medal | 8 | 7 | 0 | 1 |
| (Canada) 2003 | Silver medal | 8 | 7 | 1 | 0 |
| (Australia) 2005 | Gold medal | 6 | 6 | 0 | 0 |
| (Portugal) 2007 | 4th place | 6 | 4 | 2 | 0 |
| (Russia) 2009 | Bronze medal | 7 | 5 | 2 | 0 |
| (Italy) 2011 | 8th place | 7 | 3 | 4 | 0 |
| (Greece) 2013 | Gold medal | 6 | 6 | 0 | 0 |
| (Greece) 2015 | Gold medal | 6 | 6 | 0 | 0 |
| (Greece) 2017 | 5th place | 7 | 5 | 1 | 1 |
| (Portugal) 2019 | 6th place | 6 | 3 | 2 | 1 |
| (Israel) 2021 | Did not participated | | | | |
| (Portugal) 2023 | 5th place | 6 | 4 | 2 | 0 |
| (Brazil) 2025 | Gold medal | 6 | 6 | 0 | 0 |
| Total | 5 Titles | 100 | 78 | 19 | 3 |

==== U19 Pan American Championship ====
| Year | Result | Pld | W | L | D |
|---|---|---|---|---|---|
| (United States) 2022 | See United States women's national youth water polo team | | | | |
| (El Salvador) 2024 | See United States women's national cadet water polo team | | | | |
| (Brazil) 2026 | Gold medal | 8 | 8 | 0 | 0 |
| Total | 1 Title | 8 | 8 | 0 | 0 |
