= World Aquatics U20 Water Polo Championships =

Biennial water polo tournament

- Sport: Water Polo
- Founded: 1981
- Continent: All (International)
- Most recent champions: Men; Spain (4th title); Women; United States (5th title)
- Most titles: Men; Serbia (6 titles); Women; United States (5 titles)

The World Aquatics U20 Water Polo Championships, formerly known as the FINA World Junior Water Polo Championships, is an international water polo tournament held every two years for the players under the age of 20. It was launched by FINA in 1981 for men and in 1995 for women.

== Editions ==
=== Men ===
Ed.	Year	Host	(gold) Gold	(silver) Silver	(bronze) Bronze
1	1981	Milan, Italy	Soviet Union	Cuba	Hungary
2	1983	Barcelona, Spain	Spain	Yugoslavia	Cuba
3	1985	Istanbul, Turkey	Soviet Union	Hungary	Yugoslavia
4	1987	São Paulo, Brazil	Spain	Yugoslavia	Italy
5	1989	Narbonne, France	Yugoslavia	Soviet Union	West Germany
6	1991	Irvine, United States	Spain	Cuba	Hungary
7	1993	Cairo, Egypt	Italy	Spain	Hungary
8	1995	Dunkirk, France	Hungary	Greece	Slovakia
9	1997	Havana, Cuba	Croatia	Hungary	Greece
10	1999	Kuwait City, Kuwait	Italy	Australia	Yugoslavia
11	2001	Istanbul, Turkey	Greece	Croatia	Hungary
12	2003	Naples, Italy	Serbia and Montenegro	Hungary	Italy
13	2005	Mar del Plata, Argentina	Serbia and Montenegro	Croatia	Spain
14	2007	Long Beach, United States	Hungary	Italy	Croatia
15	2009	Šibenik, Croatia	Croatia	Greece	Serbia
16	2011	Volos, Greece	Serbia	Spain	Greece
17	2013	Szombathely, Hungary	Italy	Croatia	Serbia
18	2015	Almaty, Kazakhstan	Serbia	Italy	Hungary
19	2017	Belgrade, Serbia	Greece	Croatia	Serbia
20	2019	Kuwait City, Kuwait	Greece	Serbia	Italy
21	2021	Prague, Czech Republic	Serbia	Italy	Montenegro
22	2023	Otopeni/Bucharest, Romania	Hungary	Serbia	United States
23	2025	Zagreb, Croatia	Spain	United States	Croatia

=== Women ===
Ed.	Year	Host	(gold) Gold	(silver) Silver	(bronze) Bronze
1	1995	Sainte-Foy, Canada	Netherlands	Australia	United States
2	1997	Prague, Czech Republic	Greece	Australia	United States
3	1999	Messina, Italy	Australia	Canada	Hungary
4	2001	Perth, Australia	United States	Australia	Russia
5	2003	Calgary, Canada	Canada	United States	Spain
6	2005	Perth, Australia	United States	Russia	Australia
7	2007	Porto, Portugal	Australia	China	Hungary
8	2009	Khanty-Mansiysk, Russia	Russia	Netherlands	United States
9	2011	Trieste, Italy	Spain	Hungary	Australia
10	2013	Volos, Greece	United States	Spain	Greece
11	2015	Volos, Greece	United States	Spain	Russia
12	2017	Volos, Greece	Russia	Greece	Netherlands
13	2019	Funchal, Portugal	Russia	Netherlands	Italy
14	2021	Netanya, Israel	Spain	Greece	Hungary
15	2023	Coimbra, Portugal	Hungary	Spain	Netherlands
16	2025	Salvador, Brazil	United States	Spain	Greece

== Medals ==
=== Men ===
Rank	Nation	Gold	Silver	Bronze	Total
1	Serbia	6	4	5	15
2	Spain	4	2	1	7
3	Hungary	3	3	5	11
4	Italy	3	3	3	9
5	Greece	3	2	2	7
6	Croatia	2	4	2	8
7	Soviet Union	2	1	0	3
8	Cuba	0	2	1	3
9	United States	0	1	1	2
10	Australia	0	1	0	1
11	Montenegro	0	0	1	1
11	Slovakia	0	0	1	1
11	West Germany	0	0	1	1
Totals (13 entries)		23	23	23	69

=== Women ===
Rank	Nation	Gold	Silver	Bronze	Total
1	United States	5	1	3	9
2	Russia	3	1	2	6
3	Spain	2	4	1	7
4	Australia	2	3	2	7
5	Greece	1	2	2	5
5	Netherlands	1	2	2	5
7	Hungary	1	1	3	5
8	Canada	1	1	0	2
9	China	0	1	0	1
10	Italy	0	0	1	1
Totals (10 entries)		16	16	16	48

== See also ==
- World Aquatics U16 Water Polo Championships
- World Aquatics U18 Water Polo Championships
- World Aquatics Artistic Swimming Junior Championships
- World Aquatics Junior Swimming Championships
