= 2025 World Aquatics Women's U20 Water Polo Championships =

U20 women's water polo tournament

Tournament details
- Host country: Brazil
- City: Salvador
- Venue: 1 (in 1 host city)
- Dates: 10–16 August 2025
- Teams: 16 (from 5 confederations)

Final positions
- Champions: United States (5th title)
- Runners-up: Spain
- Third place: Greece
- Fourth place: Italy

Tournament statistics
- Matches played: 50

Awards
- Best player: (United States) Emily Ausmus
- Best goalkeeper: (Italy) Olimpia Sesena

Official website
- Salvador 2025

The 2025 World Aquatics Women's U20 Water Polo Championships was the 16th edition of the biannual water polo world championship for under-20 women's national teams. The tournament was played in Salvador, Brazil, from 10 to 16 August 2025.

The United States won their fifth title, as they defeated Spain in the final, 16–15.

== Host selection ==
- Brazil

On 28 January 2025, Salvador, Brazil was given the hosting rights.

== Teams ==
Africa

- South Africa

Americas

- Argentina
- Brazil (hosts)
- Canada
- Mexico
- United States

Asia

- China

Europe

- Croatia
- Greece
- Hungary
- Israel
- Italy
- Netherlands
- Spain

Oceania

- Australia
- New Zealand

== Venue ==
The venue is the Salvador Aquatic Arena in Salvador.

2025 World Aquatics Women's U20 Water Polo Championships is located in Brazil	Salvador
2025 World Aquatics Women's U20 Water Polo Championships is located in Brazil	Salvador Aquatic Arena
2025 World Aquatics Women's U20 Water Polo Championships is located in Brazil	Capacity: 500

== Format ==
The 16 teams were divided into two divisions. The top eight teams made Division 1 and the other eight teams Division 2. Both divisions were split into two groups of four teams. In Division 1, the top two teams from each group advanced directly to the quarterfinals, while the third- and fourth-placed teams advanced to the crossover round. In Division 2, the top two teams from each group advanced to the crossover round, while the third- and fourth-placed teams were dropped to the 13th–16th place classification group. Starting with crossovers and continuing through quarterfinals, etc., a knock-out system with consolation playoffs and classification matches was used.

== Referees ==
On 21 May 2025, the following referees were announced as officiating the championship.

Region	Country	Referees
Africa	South Africa	Lee-Anne Stewart
Americas	Argentina	Mirco Silva
Americas	Brazil	Yuri Maciel
Americas	Canada	Bill Mackay
Americas	Mexico	Yazmin Medrano Enriquez
Americas	United States	Tiffany Marie Spiritosanto
Asia	China	Siyuan Qu
Asia	Japan	Turiko Udagawa

Region	Country	Referees
Europe	Croatia	Sara Kontek
Europe	Greece	Michail Birakis
Europe	Hungary	Nikolett Sajben
Europe	Italy	Giuliana Nicolosi
Europe	Israel	Ayal Oren Gabel
Europe	Netherlands	Rik Evers
Europe	Turkey	İlkin Çakmakoğlu
Europe	Spain	Sergio Jimenez
Oceania	Australia	Nicola Johnson
Oceania	New Zealand	Michael Brooks

== Preliminary round ==
All times are local (Brasília time; UTC-3).

=== Division 1 ===
==== Group A ====
Pos	Team	Pld	W	PSW	PSL	L	GF	GA	GD	Pts	Qualification
1	Spain	3	3	0	0	0	45	18	+27	9	Quarterfinals
2	Netherlands	3	2	0	0	1	43	24	+19	6	Quarterfinals
3	New Zealand	3	1	0	0	2	24	45	−21	3	Crossovers
4	Israel	3	0	0	0	3	21	46	−25	0	Crossovers

Source: results.microplustimingservices.com
Rules for classification: 1) points; 2) head-to-head points; 3) head-to-head goal difference; 4) head-to-head number of goals scored; 5) Goal difference.

10 August 2025; 13:30	Report	Netherlands	7–13	Spain	Salvador Aquatic Arena, Salvador; Referees: Nicola Johnson (AUS), Lyle Brooks (CAN)
10 August 2025; 13:30	Report	Score by quarters: 3–1, 2–4, 1–5, 1–3			Salvador Aquatic Arena, Salvador; Referees: Nicola Johnson (AUS), Lyle Brooks (CAN)
10 August 2025; 13:30	Report	Gorter 3	Goals	Piralkova 4	Salvador Aquatic Arena, Salvador; Referees: Nicola Johnson (AUS), Lyle Brooks (CAN)

10 August 2025; 16:00	Report	New Zealand	12–11	Israel	Salvador Aquatic Arena, Salvador; Referees: Gerardo Arellano (MEX), Yuriko Udagawa (JPN)
10 August 2025; 16:00	Report	Score by quarters: 3–3, 1–4, 3–2, 5–2			Salvador Aquatic Arena, Salvador; Referees: Gerardo Arellano (MEX), Yuriko Udagawa (JPN)
10 August 2025; 16:00	Report	Marshall, Bryant 3	Goals	Tirosh 5	Salvador Aquatic Arena, Salvador; Referees: Gerardo Arellano (MEX), Yuriko Udagawa (JPN)

11 August 2025; 16:00	Report	Israel	5–19	Netherlands	Salvador Aquatic Arena, Salvador; Referees: Nikolett Sajben (HUN), Sara Kontek (CRO)
11 August 2025; 16:00	Report	Score by quarters: 1–3, 1–4, 2–8, 1–4			Salvador Aquatic Arena, Salvador; Referees: Nikolett Sajben (HUN), Sara Kontek (CRO)
11 August 2025; 16:00	Report	Katzir 2	Goals	Van der Meer 3	Salvador Aquatic Arena, Salvador; Referees: Nikolett Sajben (HUN), Sara Kontek (CRO)

11 August 2025; 20:30	Report	Spain	17–6	New Zealand	Salvador Aquatic Arena, Salvador; Referees: Giuliana Nicolosi (ITA), Li Meichunzi (CHN)
11 August 2025; 20:30	Report	Score by quarters: 7–3, 1–1, 5–1, 4–1			Salvador Aquatic Arena, Salvador; Referees: Giuliana Nicolosi (ITA), Li Meichunzi (CHN)
11 August 2025; 20:30	Report	Piralkova 5	Goals	Dunn 5	Salvador Aquatic Arena, Salvador; Referees: Giuliana Nicolosi (ITA), Li Meichunzi (CHN)

12 August 2025; 13:30	Report	Netherlands	17–6	New Zealand	Salvador Aquatic Arena, Salvador; Referees: Gerardo Arellano (MEX), Yuriko Udagawa (JPN)
12 August 2025; 13:30	Report	Score by quarters: 4–2, 4–1, 4–3, 5–0			Salvador Aquatic Arena, Salvador; Referees: Gerardo Arellano (MEX), Yuriko Udagawa (JPN)
12 August 2025; 13:30	Report	Haksteen 6	Goals	Styris 2	Salvador Aquatic Arena, Salvador; Referees: Gerardo Arellano (MEX), Yuriko Udagawa (JPN)

12 August 2025; 16:00	Report	Spain	15–5	Israel	Salvador Aquatic Arena, Salvador; Referees: Nikola Johnson (AUS), İlkin Çakmakoğlu
12 August 2025; 16:00	Report	Score by quarters: 4–0, 4–0, 5–2, 2–3			Salvador Aquatic Arena, Salvador; Referees: Nikola Johnson (AUS), İlkin Çakmakoğlu
12 August 2025; 16:00	Report	Piralkova 3	Goals	five players 1	Salvador Aquatic Arena, Salvador; Referees: Nikola Johnson (AUS), İlkin Çakmakoğlu

==== Group B ====
Pos	Team	Pld	W	PSW	PSL	L	GF	GA	GD	Pts	Qualification
1	United States	3	2	1	0	0	35	26	+9	8	Quarterfinals
2	Greece	3	2	0	1	0	38	32	+6	7	Quarterfinals
3	Italy	3	1	0	0	2	26	35	−9	3	Crossovers
4	Hungary	3	0	0	0	3	29	35	−6	0	Crossovers

Source: results.microplustimingservices.com
Rules for classification: 1) points; 2) head-to-head points; 3) head-to-head goal difference; 4) head-to-head number of goals scored; 5) Goal difference.

10 August 2025; 19:00	Report	Hungary	10–11	United States	Salvador Aquatic Arena, Salvador; Referees: Sara Kontek (CRO), Mirco Silva (ARG)
10 August 2025; 19:00	Report	Score by quarters: 4–2, 3–2, 1–2, 2–5			Salvador Aquatic Arena, Salvador; Referees: Sara Kontek (CRO), Mirco Silva (ARG)
10 August 2025; 19:00	Report	Lendvay 3	Goals	Barone, Hassett 3	Salvador Aquatic Arena, Salvador; Referees: Sara Kontek (CRO), Mirco Silva (ARG)

10 August 2025; 20:30	Report	Greece	13–11	Italy	Salvador Aquatic Arena, Salvador; Referees: Sergio Jimenez (ESP), Sander Gransjean (NED)
10 August 2025; 20:30	Report	Score by quarters: 4–2, 4–5, 1–1, 4–3			Salvador Aquatic Arena, Salvador; Referees: Sergio Jimenez (ESP), Sander Gransjean (NED)
10 August 2025; 20:30	Report	Krassa 5	Goals	Cassara 3	Salvador Aquatic Arena, Salvador; Referees: Sergio Jimenez (ESP), Sander Gransjean (NED)

11 August 2025; 13:30	Report	Italy	9–8	Hungary	Salvador Aquatic Arena, Salvador; Referees: Lyle Brooks (CAN), Gerardo Arellano (MEX)
11 August 2025; 13:30	Report	Score by quarters: 1–2, 2–2, 3–0, 3–4			Salvador Aquatic Arena, Salvador; Referees: Lyle Brooks (CAN), Gerardo Arellano (MEX)
11 August 2025; 13:30	Report	Cassara 3	Goals	Kardos 2	Salvador Aquatic Arena, Salvador; Referees: Lyle Brooks (CAN), Gerardo Arellano (MEX)

11 August 2025; 19:00	Report	United States	15–14 (PSO)	Greece	Salvador Aquatic Arena, Salvador; Referees: Nicola Johnson (AUS), Sergio Jimenez (ESP)
11 August 2025; 19:00	Report	Score by quarters: 2–4, 2–2, 3–2, 3–2 PSO: 5–4			Salvador Aquatic Arena, Salvador; Referees: Nicola Johnson (AUS), Sergio Jimenez (ESP)
11 August 2025; 19:00	Report	Ausmus 6	Goals	Tricha 5	Salvador Aquatic Arena, Salvador; Referees: Nicola Johnson (AUS), Sergio Jimenez (ESP)

12 August 2025; 19:00	Report	Hungary	11–15	Greece	Salvador Aquatic Arena, Salvador; Referees: Mirco Silva (ARG), Sander Gransjean (NED)
12 August 2025; 19:00	Report	Score by quarters: 1–6, 3–4, 5–3, 2–2			Salvador Aquatic Arena, Salvador; Referees: Mirco Silva (ARG), Sander Gransjean (NED)
12 August 2025; 19:00	Report	Macsai 3	Goals	Krassa 6	Salvador Aquatic Arena, Salvador; Referees: Mirco Silva (ARG), Sander Gransjean (NED)

12 August 2025; 20:30	Report	United States	14–6	Italy	Salvador Aquatic Arena, Salvador; Referees: Sara Kontek (CRO), Michael Brooks (NZL)
12 August 2025; 20:30	Report	Score by quarters: 4–3, 3–0, 4–1, 3–2			Salvador Aquatic Arena, Salvador; Referees: Sara Kontek (CRO), Michael Brooks (NZL)
12 August 2025; 20:30	Report	Bonaguidi 6	Goals	Bianco 2	Salvador Aquatic Arena, Salvador; Referees: Sara Kontek (CRO), Michael Brooks (NZL)

=== Division 2 ===
==== Group C ====
Pos	Team	Pld	W	PSW	PSL	L	GF	GA	GD	Pts	Qualification
1	Croatia	3	3	0	0	0	56	25	+31	9	Crossovers
2	Brazil (H)	3	2	0	0	1	53	30	+23	6	Crossovers
3	Argentina	3	1	0	0	2	36	42	−6	3	13th–16th place classification
4	Mexico	3	0	0	0	3	15	63	−48	0	13th–16th place classification

Source: results.microplustimingservices.com
Rules for classification: 1) points; 2) head-to-head points; 3) head-to-head goal difference; 4) head-to-head number of goals scored; 5) Goal difference.
(H) Host

10 August 2025; 09:00	Report	Mexico	7–16	Argentina	Salvador Aquatic Arena, Salvador; Referees: Michael Brooks (NZL), Matthew Stringer (RSA)
10 August 2025; 09:00	Report	Score by quarters: 1–4, 2–5, 2–2, 2–5			Salvador Aquatic Arena, Salvador; Referees: Michael Brooks (NZL), Matthew Stringer (RSA)
10 August 2025; 09:00	Report	Fernandez 3	Goals	Perasso, Bacigalupo 4	Salvador Aquatic Arena, Salvador; Referees: Michael Brooks (NZL), Matthew Stringer (RSA)

10 August 2025; 17:30	Report	Brazil	9–18	Croatia	Salvador Aquatic Arena, Salvador; Referees: Giuliana Nicolosi (ITA), Michali Birakis (GRE)
10 August 2025; 17:30	Report	Score by quarters: 3–5, 2–2, 2–5, 2–6			Salvador Aquatic Arena, Salvador; Referees: Giuliana Nicolosi (ITA), Michali Birakis (GRE)
10 August 2025; 17:30	Report	Lorieto 4	Goals	Jankovic 6	Salvador Aquatic Arena, Salvador; Referees: Giuliana Nicolosi (ITA), Michali Birakis (GRE)

11 August 2025; 12:00	Report	Croatia	19–5	Mexico	Salvador Aquatic Arena, Salvador; Referees: Ilkin Cakmakoglu (TUR), Tiffany Marie Spiritosanto (USA)
11 August 2025; 12:00	Report	Score by quarters: 5–2, 4–3, 6–0, 4–0			Salvador Aquatic Arena, Salvador; Referees: Ilkin Cakmakoglu (TUR), Tiffany Marie Spiritosanto (USA)
11 August 2025; 12:00	Report	Rozic 7	Goals	Gaytan Martinez 3	Salvador Aquatic Arena, Salvador; Referees: Ilkin Cakmakoglu (TUR), Tiffany Marie Spiritosanto (USA)

11 August 2025; 17:30	Report	Argentina	9–16	Brazil	Salvador Aquatic Arena, Salvador; Referees: Yuriko Udagawa (JPN), Ayal Oren Gabel (ISR)
11 August 2025; 17:30	Report	Score by quarters: 1–6, 3–4, 2–3, 3–3			Salvador Aquatic Arena, Salvador; Referees: Yuriko Udagawa (JPN), Ayal Oren Gabel (ISR)
11 August 2025; 17:30	Report	Sampedro 3	Goals	Nascimento 4	Salvador Aquatic Arena, Salvador; Referees: Yuriko Udagawa (JPN), Ayal Oren Gabel (ISR)

12 August 2025; 09:00	Report	Argentina	11–19	Croatia	Salvador Aquatic Arena, Salvador; Referees: Lyle Brooks (CAN), Matthew Stringer (RSA)
12 August 2025; 09:00	Report	Score by quarters: 3–5, 3–3, 3–5, 2–6			Salvador Aquatic Arena, Salvador; Referees: Lyle Brooks (CAN), Matthew Stringer (RSA)
12 August 2025; 09:00	Report	Mastronardi 4	Goals	Glas 8	Salvador Aquatic Arena, Salvador; Referees: Lyle Brooks (CAN), Matthew Stringer (RSA)

12 August 2025; 17:30	Report	Mexico	3–28	Brazil	Salvador Aquatic Arena, Salvador; Referees: Nikolett Sajben (HUN), Li Meichunzi (CHN)
12 August 2025; 17:30	Report	Score by quarters: 0–10, 1–6, 1–5, 1–7			Salvador Aquatic Arena, Salvador; Referees: Nikolett Sajben (HUN), Li Meichunzi (CHN)
12 August 2025; 17:30	Report	Fernandez 2	Goals	Dos Santos 5	Salvador Aquatic Arena, Salvador; Referees: Nikolett Sajben (HUN), Li Meichunzi (CHN)

==== Group D ====
Pos	Team	Pld	W	PSW	PSL	L	GF	GA	GD	Pts	Qualification
1	Australia	3	3	0	0	0	40	16	+24	9	Crossovers
2	China	3	2	0	0	1	36	26	+10	6	Crossovers
3	Canada	3	1	0	0	2	26	29	−3	3	13th–16th place classification
4	South Africa	3	0	0	0	3	16	47	−31	0	13th–16th place classification

Source: results.microplustimingservices.com
Rules for classification: 1) points; 2) head-to-head points; 3) head-to-head goal difference; 4) head-to-head number of goals scored; 5) Goal difference.

10 August 2025; 10:30	Report	Canada	8–12	China	Salvador Aquatic Arena, Salvador; Referees: Nikolett Sajben (HUN), Tiffany Spiritosanto (USA)
10 August 2025; 10:30	Report	Score by quarters: 2–3, 1–2, 2–4, 3–3			Salvador Aquatic Arena, Salvador; Referees: Nikolett Sajben (HUN), Tiffany Spiritosanto (USA)
10 August 2025; 10:30	Report	three players 2	Goals	Zhang 4	Salvador Aquatic Arena, Salvador; Referees: Nikolett Sajben (HUN), Tiffany Spiritosanto (USA)

10 August 2025; 12:00	Report	South Africa	4–17	Australia	Salvador Aquatic Arena, Salvador; Referees: İlkin Çakmakoğlu (TUR), Yuri Maciel (BRA)
10 August 2025; 12:00	Report	Score by quarters: 0–5, 1–5, 2–2, 1–5			Salvador Aquatic Arena, Salvador; Referees: İlkin Çakmakoğlu (TUR), Yuri Maciel (BRA)
10 August 2025; 12:00	Report	four players 1	Goals	three players 3	Salvador Aquatic Arena, Salvador; Referees: İlkin Çakmakoğlu (TUR), Yuri Maciel (BRA)

11 August 2025; 09:00	Report	China	16–4	South Africa	Salvador Aquatic Arena, Salvador; Referees: Yuri Maciel (BRA), Michael Brooks (NZL)
11 August 2025; 09:00	Report	Score by quarters: 4–3, 5–0, 4–0, 3–1			Salvador Aquatic Arena, Salvador; Referees: Yuri Maciel (BRA), Michael Brooks (NZL)
11 August 2025; 09:00	Report	Zou 6	Goals	four players 1	Salvador Aquatic Arena, Salvador; Referees: Yuri Maciel (BRA), Michael Brooks (NZL)

11 August 2025; 10:30	Report	Australia	9–4	Canada	Salvador Aquatic Arena, Salvador; Referees: Sander Gransjean (NED), Mirco Silva (ARG)
11 August 2025; 10:30	Report	Score by quarters: 3–0, 1–0, 1–2, 4–2			Salvador Aquatic Arena, Salvador; Referees: Sander Gransjean (NED), Mirco Silva (ARG)
11 August 2025; 10:30	Report	three players 2	Goals	four players 1	Salvador Aquatic Arena, Salvador; Referees: Sander Gransjean (NED), Mirco Silva (ARG)

12 August 2025; 10:30	Report	Canada	14–8	South Africa	Salvador Aquatic Arena, Salvador; Referees: Sergio Jimenez (ESP), Ayal Oren Gabel (ISR)
12 August 2025; 10:30	Report	Score by quarters: 4–2, 5–1, 3–2, 2–3			Salvador Aquatic Arena, Salvador; Referees: Sergio Jimenez (ESP), Ayal Oren Gabel (ISR)
12 August 2025; 10:30	Report	Madi 6	Goals	McMurray, Van der Bosch 2	Salvador Aquatic Arena, Salvador; Referees: Sergio Jimenez (ESP), Ayal Oren Gabel (ISR)

12 August 2025; 12:00	Report	China	8–14	Australia	Salvador Aquatic Arena, Salvador; Referees: Tiffany Spiritosanto (USA), Michali Birakis (GRE)
12 August 2025; 12:00	Report	Score by quarters: 1–4, 3–3, 4–4, 0–3			Salvador Aquatic Arena, Salvador; Referees: Tiffany Spiritosanto (USA), Michali Birakis (GRE)
12 August 2025; 12:00	Report	five players 1	Goals	Taoso, Daly 4	Salvador Aquatic Arena, Salvador; Referees: Tiffany Spiritosanto (USA), Michali Birakis (GRE)

== 13th–16th place classification ==
Pos	Team	Pld	W	PSW	PSL	L	GF	GA	GD	Pts
13	Canada	3	3	0	0	0	50	20	+30	9
14	Argentina	3	2	0	0	1	35	37	−2	6
15	South Africa	3	1	0	0	2	29	35	−6	3
16	Mexico	3	0	0	0	3	24	46	−22	0

Source: results.microplustimingservices.com

13 August 2025; 10:30	Report	Argentina	15–10	South Africa	Salvador Aquatic Arena, Salvador; Referees: Nicola Johnson (AUS), Yuri Maciel (BRA)
13 August 2025; 10:30	Report	Score by quarters: 5–1, 3–3, 2–1, 5–5			Salvador Aquatic Arena, Salvador; Referees: Nicola Johnson (AUS), Yuri Maciel (BRA)
13 August 2025; 10:30	Report	Bacigalupo 6	Goals	Van der Bosch 3	Salvador Aquatic Arena, Salvador; Referees: Nicola Johnson (AUS), Yuri Maciel (BRA)

13 August 2025; 12:00	Report	Canada	19–8	Mexico	Salvador Aquatic Arena, Salvador; Referees: Li Meichunzi (CHN), Ayal Oren Gabel (ISR)
13 August 2025; 12:00	Report	Score by quarters: 4–0, 7–1, 2–5, 6–2			Salvador Aquatic Arena, Salvador; Referees: Li Meichunzi (CHN), Ayal Oren Gabel (ISR)
13 August 2025; 12:00	Report	Benjamin, Heaver 4	Goals	Fernandez, Rangel 2	Salvador Aquatic Arena, Salvador; Referees: Li Meichunzi (CHN), Ayal Oren Gabel (ISR)

14 August 2025; 9:00	Report	Argentina	12–8	Mexico	Salvador Aquatic Arena, Salvador; Referees: Yuriko Udagawa (JPN), Giulina Nicolosi (ITA)
14 August 2025; 9:00	Report	Score by quarters: 5–1, 2–3, 2–2, 3–2			Salvador Aquatic Arena, Salvador; Referees: Yuriko Udagawa (JPN), Giulina Nicolosi (ITA)
14 August 2025; 9:00	Report	Mastronardi 4	Goals	Gaytan Martinez 4	Salvador Aquatic Arena, Salvador; Referees: Yuriko Udagawa (JPN), Giulina Nicolosi (ITA)

14 August 2025; 10:30	Report	Canada	12–4	South Africa	Salvador Aquatic Arena, Salvador; Referees: İlkin Çakmakoğlu (TUR), Ayal Oren Gabel (ISR)
14 August 2025; 10:30	Report	Score by quarters: 3–0, 2–1, 5–1, 2–2			Salvador Aquatic Arena, Salvador; Referees: İlkin Çakmakoğlu (TUR), Ayal Oren Gabel (ISR)
14 August 2025; 10:30	Report	Featherstone, Plomp 3	Goals	Banks, Voke 2	Salvador Aquatic Arena, Salvador; Referees: İlkin Çakmakoğlu (TUR), Ayal Oren Gabel (ISR)

15 August 2025; 9:00	Report	Argentina	8–19	Canada	Salvador Aquatic Arena, Salvador; Referees: Sara Kontek (CRO), Yuri Maciel (BRA)
15 August 2025; 9:00	Report	Score by quarters: 3–4, 2–7, 1–3, 2–5			Salvador Aquatic Arena, Salvador; Referees: Sara Kontek (CRO), Yuri Maciel (BRA)
15 August 2025; 9:00	Report	Bacigalupo 4	Goals	Plomp 5	Salvador Aquatic Arena, Salvador; Referees: Sara Kontek (CRO), Yuri Maciel (BRA)

15 August 2025; 10:30	Report	Mexico	8–15	South Africa	Salvador Aquatic Arena, Salvador; Referees: Li Meichunzi (CAN), Lyle Brooks (CAN)
15 August 2025; 10:30	Report	Score by quarters: 2–4, 1–6, 3–2, 2–3			Salvador Aquatic Arena, Salvador; Referees: Li Meichunzi (CAN), Lyle Brooks (CAN)
15 August 2025; 10:30	Report	Gaytan Martinez 3	Goals	Christian 4	Salvador Aquatic Arena, Salvador; Referees: Li Meichunzi (CAN), Lyle Brooks (CAN)

== Knockout stage ==
=== Brackets ===
==== Main bracket ====
Crossovers
13 August
Israel	13
Croatia	14
13 August
Italy	15
China	12
13 August
Hungary	17
Australia	12
13 August
New Zealand	9
Brazil	10

Quarterfinals
14 August
United States	24
Croatia	6
14 August
Netherlands	9
Italy	11
14 August
Spain	15
Hungary	13
14 August
Greece	20
Brazil	7

Semifinals
15 August
United States	13
Italy	11
15 August
Spain	11
Greece	9

Final
16 August
United States	16
Spain	15
Third place game
16 August
Italy	7
Greece	10

==== 5th place bracket ====
5th–8th place semifinals
15 August
Croatia	7
Netherlands	13
15 August
Hungary	19
Brazil	8

Fifth place game
16 August
Netherlands	11
Hungary	19
Seventh place game
16 August
Croatia	17
Brazil	11

==== 9th place bracket ====
9th–12th place semifinals
14 August
Israel	10
China	19
14 August
Australia	13
New Zealand	5

Ninth place game
15 August
China	8
Australia	12
Eleventh place game
15 August
Israel	10
New Zealand	11

=== Crossovers ===
13 August 2025; 13:30	Report	Israel	13–14	Croatia	Salvador Aquatic Arena, Salvador; Referees: Nikolett Sajben (HUN), Mirco Silva (ARG)
13 August 2025; 13:30	Report	Score by quarters: 4–2, 2–8, 3–2, 4–2			Salvador Aquatic Arena, Salvador; Referees: Nikolett Sajben (HUN), Mirco Silva (ARG)
13 August 2025; 13:30	Report	Tirosh 7	Goals	Jankovic 5	Salvador Aquatic Arena, Salvador; Referees: Nikolett Sajben (HUN), Mirco Silva (ARG)

13 August 2025; 16:00	Report	Hungary	17–12	Australia	Salvador Aquatic Arena, Salvador; Referees: Giuliana Nicolosi (ITA), Kyle Brooks (CAN)
13 August 2025; 16:00	Report	Score by quarters: 5–2, 6–2, 3–4, 3–4			Salvador Aquatic Arena, Salvador; Referees: Giuliana Nicolosi (ITA), Kyle Brooks (CAN)
13 August 2025; 16:00	Report	Hadju 7	Goals	four players 4	Salvador Aquatic Arena, Salvador; Referees: Giuliana Nicolosi (ITA), Kyle Brooks (CAN)

13 August 2025; 17:30	Report	Italy	15–12	China	Salvador Aquatic Arena, Salvador; Referees: Michal Birakis (GRE), Matthew Stringer (RSA)
13 August 2025; 17:30	Report	Score by quarters: 3–1, 4–5, 3–3, 5–3			Salvador Aquatic Arena, Salvador; Referees: Michal Birakis (GRE), Matthew Stringer (RSA)
13 August 2025; 17:30	Report	Di Maria 4	Goals	Wang 6	Salvador Aquatic Arena, Salvador; Referees: Michal Birakis (GRE), Matthew Stringer (RSA)

13 August 2025; 19:00	Report	New Zealand	9–10	Brazil	Salvador Aquatic Arena, Salvador; Referees: Sander Gransjean (NED), İlkin Çakmakoğlu (TUR)
13 August 2025; 19:00	Report	Score by quarters: 2–4, 5–1, 1–2, 1–3			Salvador Aquatic Arena, Salvador; Referees: Sander Gransjean (NED), İlkin Çakmakoğlu (TUR)
13 August 2025; 19:00	Report	Dunn 3	Goals	Neves 4	Salvador Aquatic Arena, Salvador; Referees: Sander Gransjean (NED), İlkin Çakmakoğlu (TUR)

=== 9th–12th place semifinals ===
14 August 2025; 12:00	Report	Israel	10–19	China	Salvador Aquatic Arena, Salvador; Referees: Lyle Brooks (CAN), Gerardo Arellano (MEX)
14 August 2025; 12:00	Report	Score by quarters: 3–5, 1–6, 5–5, 1–3			Salvador Aquatic Arena, Salvador; Referees: Lyle Brooks (CAN), Gerardo Arellano (MEX)
14 August 2025; 12:00	Report	Levinshtein 3	Goals	Wang 5	Salvador Aquatic Arena, Salvador; Referees: Lyle Brooks (CAN), Gerardo Arellano (MEX)

14 August 2025; 13:30	Report	Australia	13–5	New Zealand	Salvador Aquatic Arena, Salvador; Referees: Sergio Jimenez (ESP), Mirco Silva (ARG)
14 August 2025; 13:30	Report	Score by quarters: 3–2, 2–2, 3–0, 5–1			Salvador Aquatic Arena, Salvador; Referees: Sergio Jimenez (ESP), Mirco Silva (ARG)
14 August 2025; 13:30	Report	Daly 4	Goals	Styris 2	Salvador Aquatic Arena, Salvador; Referees: Sergio Jimenez (ESP), Mirco Silva (ARG)

==== Eleventh place game ====
15 August 2025; 12:00	Report	Israel	10–11	New Zealand	Salvador Aquatic Arena, Salvador; Referees: Tiffany Spiritosanto (USA), Matthew Stringer (RSA)
15 August 2025; 12:00	Report	Score by quarters: 2–2, 3–2, 4–3, 1–4			Salvador Aquatic Arena, Salvador; Referees: Tiffany Spiritosanto (USA), Matthew Stringer (RSA)
15 August 2025; 12:00	Report	Tirosh 4	Goals	Marshall, Dunn 3	Salvador Aquatic Arena, Salvador; Referees: Tiffany Spiritosanto (USA), Matthew Stringer (RSA)

==== Ninth place game ====
15 August 2025; 13:30	Report	China	8–12	Australia	Salvador Aquatic Arena, Salvador; Referees: Michali Birakis (GRE), Sergio Jimenez (ESP)
15 August 2025; 13:30	Report	Score by quarters: 3–3, 0–2, 2–5, 3–2			Salvador Aquatic Arena, Salvador; Referees: Michali Birakis (GRE), Sergio Jimenez (ESP)
15 August 2025; 13:30	Report	Zhang 3	Goals	Daly 3	Salvador Aquatic Arena, Salvador; Referees: Michali Birakis (GRE), Sergio Jimenez (ESP)

=== Quarterfinals ===
14 August 2025; 16:00	Report	United States	24–6	Croatia	Salvador Aquatic Arena, Salvador; Referees: Li Meichunzi (CHN), Michael Brooks (NZL)
14 August 2025; 16:00	Report	Score by quarters: 6–3, 5–2, 7–1, 6–0			Salvador Aquatic Arena, Salvador; Referees: Li Meichunzi (CHN), Michael Brooks (NZL)
14 August 2025; 16:00	Report	Mcaninch 5	Goals	Butic 3	Salvador Aquatic Arena, Salvador; Referees: Li Meichunzi (CHN), Michael Brooks (NZL)

14 August 2025; 17:30	Report	Spain	15–13 (PSO)	Hungary	Salvador Aquatic Arena, Salvador; Referees: Sara Kontek (CRO), Tiffany Spiritosanto (USA)
14 August 2025; 17:30	Report	Score by quarters: 2–1, 5–4, 3–3, 1–3 PSO: 4–2			Salvador Aquatic Arena, Salvador; Referees: Sara Kontek (CRO), Tiffany Spiritosanto (USA)
14 August 2025; 17:30	Report	Penalver 4	Goals	Macsai 5	Salvador Aquatic Arena, Salvador; Referees: Sara Kontek (CRO), Tiffany Spiritosanto (USA)

14 August 2025; 19:00	Report	Netherlands	9–11	Italy	Salvador Aquatic Arena, Salvador; Referees: Nikolett Sajben (HUN), Michali Birakis (GRE)
14 August 2025; 19:00	Report	Score by quarters: 0–3, 2–3, 4–2, 3–3			Salvador Aquatic Arena, Salvador; Referees: Nikolett Sajben (HUN), Michali Birakis (GRE)
14 August 2025; 19:00	Report	Christodolou-Out 3	Goals	Cassara, Bovo 3	Salvador Aquatic Arena, Salvador; Referees: Nikolett Sajben (HUN), Michali Birakis (GRE)

14 August 2025; 20:30	Report	Greece	20–7	Brazil	Salvador Aquatic Arena, Salvador; Referees: Nicola Johnson (AUS), Matthew Stringer (RSA)
14 August 2025; 20:30	Report	Score by quarters: 6–2, 5–2, 5–2, 4–1			Salvador Aquatic Arena, Salvador; Referees: Nicola Johnson (AUS), Matthew Stringer (RSA)
14 August 2025; 20:30	Report	four players 3	Goals	Nascimento 3	Salvador Aquatic Arena, Salvador; Referees: Nicola Johnson (AUS), Matthew Stringer (RSA)

=== 5th–8th place semifinals ===
15 August 2025; 16:00	Report	Croatia	7–13	Netherlands	Salvador Aquatic Arena, Salvador; Referees: Michael Brooks (NZL), Gerardo Arellano (MEX)
15 August 2025; 16:00	Report	Score by quarters: 0–2, 1–4, 4–1, 2–6			Salvador Aquatic Arena, Salvador; Referees: Michael Brooks (NZL), Gerardo Arellano (MEX)
15 August 2025; 16:00	Report	Glas 3	Goals	Jutte 3 Van der Meer 3	Salvador Aquatic Arena, Salvador; Referees: Michael Brooks (NZL), Gerardo Arellano (MEX)

15 August 2025; 17:30	Report	Hungary	19–8	Brazil	Salvador Aquatic Arena, Salvador; Referees: Yuriko Udagawa (JPN), Giuliana Nicolosi (ITA)
15 August 2025; 17:30	Report	Score by quarters: 5–3, 4–1, 6–2, 4–2			Salvador Aquatic Arena, Salvador; Referees: Yuriko Udagawa (JPN), Giuliana Nicolosi (ITA)
15 August 2025; 17:30	Report	Lendvay 5	Goals	three players 2	Salvador Aquatic Arena, Salvador; Referees: Yuriko Udagawa (JPN), Giuliana Nicolosi (ITA)

==== Seventh place game ====
16 August 2025; 10:00	Report	Croatia	17–11	Brazil	Salvador Aquatic Arena, Salvador; Referees: Tiffany Spiritosanto (USA), Li Meichunzi (CHN)
16 August 2025; 10:00	Report	Score by quarters: 5–5, 5–3, 2–3, 5–0			Salvador Aquatic Arena, Salvador; Referees: Tiffany Spiritosanto (USA), Li Meichunzi (CHN)
16 August 2025; 10:00	Report	Rozic 5	Goals	Nascimento, Lorieto 3	Salvador Aquatic Arena, Salvador; Referees: Tiffany Spiritosanto (USA), Li Meichunzi (CHN)

==== Fifth place game ====
16 August 2025; 11:30	Report	Netherlands	11–19	Hungary	Salvador Aquatic Arena, Salvador; Referees: Giuliana Nicolosi (ITA), Michael Brooks (NZL)
16 August 2025; 11:30	Report	Score by quarters: 2–5, 2–4, 4–5, 3–5			Salvador Aquatic Arena, Salvador; Referees: Giuliana Nicolosi (ITA), Michael Brooks (NZL)
16 August 2025; 11:30	Report	Groenendijk 4	Goals	Hadju 4	Salvador Aquatic Arena, Salvador; Referees: Giuliana Nicolosi (ITA), Michael Brooks (NZL)

=== Semifinals ===
15 August 2025; 19:00	Report	United States	13–11 (PSO)	Italy	Salvador Aquatic Arena, Salvador; Referees: Nicola Johnson (AUS), Mirco Silva (ARG)
15 August 2025; 19:00	Report	Score by quarters: 2–3, 2–2, 4–2, 1–2 PSO: 4–2			Salvador Aquatic Arena, Salvador; Referees: Nicola Johnson (AUS), Mirco Silva (ARG)
15 August 2025; 19:00	Report	Ausmus 5	Goals	Cassara, Malluzzo 5	Salvador Aquatic Arena, Salvador; Referees: Nicola Johnson (AUS), Mirco Silva (ARG)

15 August 2025; 20:30	Report	Spain	11–9	Greece	Salvador Aquatic Arena, Salvador; Referees: Nikolett Sajben (HUN), Sander Gransjean
15 August 2025; 20:30	Report	Score by quarters: 0–3, 3–4, 3–0, 5–2			Salvador Aquatic Arena, Salvador; Referees: Nikolett Sajben (HUN), Sander Gransjean
15 August 2025; 20:30	Report	Piralkova 5	Goals	four players 2	Salvador Aquatic Arena, Salvador; Referees: Nikolett Sajben (HUN), Sander Gransjean

==== Third place game ====
16 August 2025; 13:00	Report	Italy	7–10	Greece	Salvador Aquatic Arena, Salvador; Referees: Nicola Johnson (AUS), Gerardo Arellaño (MEX)
16 August 2025; 13:00	Report	Score by quarters: 2–1, 2–2, 1–6, 2–1			Salvador Aquatic Arena, Salvador; Referees: Nicola Johnson (AUS), Gerardo Arellaño (MEX)
16 August 2025; 13:00	Report	Di Maria 2	Goals	four players 2	Salvador Aquatic Arena, Salvador; Referees: Nicola Johnson (AUS), Gerardo Arellaño (MEX)

==== Final ====
16 August 2025; 14:30	Report	United States	16–15	Spain	Salvador Aquatic Arena, Salvador; Referees: Nikolett Sajben (HUN), Lyle Brooks (CAN)
16 August 2025; 14:30	Report	Score by quarters: 3–3, 3–3, 6–5, 4–4			Salvador Aquatic Arena, Salvador; Referees: Nikolett Sajben (HUN), Lyle Brooks (CAN)
16 August 2025; 14:30	Report	Haaland-Ford 4	Goals	Penalver 4	Salvador Aquatic Arena, Salvador; Referees: Nikolett Sajben (HUN), Lyle Brooks (CAN)

== Final standings ==
Rank	Team
1st place, gold medalist(s)	United States
2nd place, silver medalist(s)	Spain
3rd place, bronze medalist(s)	Greece
4	Italy
5	Hungary
6	Netherlands
7	Croatia
8	Brazil
9	Australia
10	China
11	New Zealand
12	Israel
13	Canada
14	Argentina
15	South Africa
16	Mexico
