= 2024 Pan American U19 Water Polo Championship – Men's tournament =

Tournament details
- Host country: El Salvador
- City: Santa Tecla
- Venue: 1 (in 1 host city)
- Dates: 21–26 May 2024
- Teams: 8 (from 1 confederation)

Final positions
- Champions: United States
- Runners-up: Canada
- Third place: Brazil
- Fourth place: Colombia

Tournament statistics
- Matches played: 24
- Goals scored: 635 (26.46 per match)

Official website
- sansalvador2024

The 2024 Pan American U19 Water Polo Championship – Men's tournament was an international youth water polo tournament organized by the PanAm Aquatics. The event was held in Santa Tecla, El Salvador, from 21 to 26 May 2024.

The tournament also served as the Americas' qualifiers for the 2025 World Aquatics Men's U20 Water Polo Championships, where the top five teams qualified.

Players born in 2005 or later were eligible to participate.

== Format ==
Eight teams entered the championship. In the first round, the teams were drawn into two round-robin groups of four. All teams advanced to the final round, which was played in a knock-out system with consolation playoffs and classification matches.

All times are local (Central Time Zone; UTC-6).

== First round ==
=== Group A ===
Pos	Team	Pld	W	PSW	PSL	L	GF	GA	GD	Pts
1	United States	3	3	0	0	0	58	12	+46	9
2	Argentina	3	2	0	0	1	52	26	+26	6
3	Uruguay	3	1	0	0	2	22	51	−29	3
4	El Salvador (H)	3	0	0	0	3	12	55	−43	0

Source: sansalvador2024.panamaquaticsevents.com
(H) Host

21 May 2024; 14:20	Report	Uruguay	1–22	United States	Polideportivo de Ciudad Merliot, Santa Tecla
21 May 2024; 14:20	Report	Score by quarters: 0–5, 0–8, 1–4, 0–5			Polideportivo de Ciudad Merliot, Santa Tecla

21 May 2024; 18:20	Report	El Salvador	1–23	Argentina	Polideportivo de Ciudad Merliot, Santa Tecla
21 May 2024; 18:20	Report	Score by quarters: 1–11, 0–4, 0–5, 0–3			Polideportivo de Ciudad Merliot, Santa Tecla

22 May 2024; 10:40	Report	Uruguay	3–19	Argentina	Polideportivo de Ciudad Merliot, Santa Tecla
22 May 2024; 10:40	Report	Score by quarters: 0–7, 1–3, 0–5, 2–4			Polideportivo de Ciudad Merliot, Santa Tecla

22 May 2024; 18:20	Report	El Salvador	1–14	United States	Polideportivo de Ciudad Merliot, Santa Tecla
22 May 2024; 18:20	Report	Score by quarters: 0–7, 0–3, 0–2, 1–2			Polideportivo de Ciudad Merliot, Santa Tecla

23 May 2024; 14:20	Report	Argentina	10–22	United States	Polideportivo de Ciudad Merliot, Santa Tecla
23 May 2024; 14:20	Report	Score by quarters: 2–6, 3–5, 3–6, 2–5			Polideportivo de Ciudad Merliot, Santa Tecla

23 May 2024; 18:20	Report	El Salvador	10–18	Uruguay	Polideportivo de Ciudad Merliot, Santa Tecla
23 May 2024; 18:20	Report	Score by quarters: 1–5, 5–3, 2–4, 2–6			Polideportivo de Ciudad Merliot, Santa Tecla

=== Group B ===
Pos	Team	Pld	W	PSW	PSL	L	GF	GA	GD	Pts
1	Canada	3	2	1	0	0	57	26	+31	8
2	Brazil	3	2	0	1	0	75	31	+44	7
3	Colombia	3	1	0	0	2	46	42	+4	3
4	Mexico	3	0	0	0	3	11	90	−79	0

Source: sansalvador2024.panamaquaticsevents.com

21 May 2024; 10:40	Report	Canada	30–1	Mexico	Polideportivo de Ciudad Merliot, Santa Tecla
21 May 2024; 10:40	Report	Score by quarters: 8–0, 8–0, 9–0, 5–1			Polideportivo de Ciudad Merliot, Santa Tecla

21 May 2024; 15:00	Report	Colombia	12–24	Brazil	Polideportivo de Ciudad Merliot, Santa Tecla
21 May 2024; 15:00	Report	Score by quarters: 3–7, 2–4, 3–6, 4–7			Polideportivo de Ciudad Merliot, Santa Tecla

22 May 2024; 13:00	Report	Colombia	25–7	Mexico	Polideportivo de Ciudad Merliot, Santa Tecla
22 May 2024; 13:00	Report	Score by quarters: 4–1, 6–2, 6–2, 9–2			Polideportivo de Ciudad Merliot, Santa Tecla

22 May 2024; 15:40	Report	Canada	16–16; PSO: 4–3	Brazil	Polideportivo de Ciudad Merliot, Santa Tecla
22 May 2024; 15:40	Report	Score by quarters: 2–6, 3–4, 8–1, 3–5			Polideportivo de Ciudad Merliot, Santa Tecla

23 May 2024; 10:40	Report	Canada	11–9	Colombia	Polideportivo de Ciudad Merliot, Santa Tecla
23 May 2024; 10:40	Report	Score by quarters: 3–1, 1–3, 4–3, 3–2			Polideportivo de Ciudad Merliot, Santa Tecla

23 May 2024; 15:40	Report	Mexico	3–35	Brazil	Polideportivo de Ciudad Merliot, Santa Tecla
23 May 2024; 15:40	Report	Score by quarters: 1–6, 0–7, 1–10, 1–12			Polideportivo de Ciudad Merliot, Santa Tecla

== Playoffs ==
=== Bracket ===
5th place match
Uruguay	6
Argentina	18
7th place match
Mexico	17
El Salvador	8

5th–8th place semifinals
Mexico	10
Uruguay	15
Argentina	21
El Salvador	2

Quarterfinals
A1	United States	22
B4	Mexico	3
A3	Uruguay	5
B2	Brazil	28
A2	Argentina	10(4)
B3	Colombia	10(5)
B1	Canada	20
A4	El Salvador	1

Semifinals
United States	16
Brazil	15
Colombia	8
Canada	11

Final
United States	10
Canada	7
3rd place match
Brazil	30
Colombia	9

=== Quarterfinals ===
24 May 2024; 10:40	Report	Argentina	10–10; PSO: 4–5	Colombia	Polideportivo de Ciudad Merliot, Santa Tecla
24 May 2024; 10:40	Report	Score by quarters: 2–1, 2–3, 3–3, 3–3			Polideportivo de Ciudad Merliot, Santa Tecla

24 May 2024; 13:00	Report	Uruguay	5–28	Brazil	Polideportivo de Ciudad Merliot, Santa Tecla
24 May 2024; 13:00	Report	Score by quarters: 1–9, 0–9, 3–5, 1–5			Polideportivo de Ciudad Merliot, Santa Tecla

24 May 2024; 15:40	Report	United States	22–3	Mexico	Polideportivo de Ciudad Merliot, Santa Tecla
24 May 2024; 15:40	Report	Score by quarters: 5–0, 4–1, 7–1, 6–1			Polideportivo de Ciudad Merliot, Santa Tecla

24 May 2024; 17:00	Report	Canada	20–1	El Salvador	Polideportivo de Ciudad Merliot, Santa Tecla
24 May 2024; 17:00	Report	Score by quarters: 4–0, 4–1, 7–0, 5–0			Polideportivo de Ciudad Merliot, Santa Tecla

=== 5th–8th place semifinals ===
25 May 2024; 10:40	Report	Argentina	21–2	El Salvador	Polideportivo de Ciudad Merliot, Santa Tecla
25 May 2024; 10:40	Report	Score by quarters: 4–1, 3–1, 9–0, 5–0			Polideportivo de Ciudad Merliot, Santa Tecla

25 May 2024; 13:00	Report	Uruguay	15–10	Mexico	Polideportivo de Ciudad Merliot, Santa Tecla
25 May 2024; 13:00	Report	Score by quarters: 2–2, 5–2, 5–3, 3–3			Polideportivo de Ciudad Merliot, Santa Tecla

==== 7th place match ====
26 May 2024; 8:00	Report	El Salvador	8–17	Mexico	Polideportivo de Ciudad Merliot, Santa Tecla
26 May 2024; 8:00	Report	Score by quarters: 1–5, 0–2, 4–4, 3–6			Polideportivo de Ciudad Merliot, Santa Tecla

==== 5th place match ====
26 May 2024; 10:40	Report	Argentina	18–6	Uruguay	Polideportivo de Ciudad Merliot, Santa Tecla
26 May 2024; 10:40	Report	Score by quarters: 5–0, 4–1, 5–3, 4–2			Polideportivo de Ciudad Merliot, Santa Tecla

=== Semifinals ===
25 May 2024; 14:20	Report	Colombia	8–11	Canada	Polideportivo de Ciudad Merliot, Santa Tecla
25 May 2024; 14:20	Report	Score by quarters: 2–6, 1–2, 2–2, 3–1			Polideportivo de Ciudad Merliot, Santa Tecla

25 May 2024; 15:40	Report	United States	16–15	Brazil	Polideportivo de Ciudad Merliot, Santa Tecla
25 May 2024; 15:40	Report	Score by quarters: 3–2, 3–6, 4–5, 6–2			Polideportivo de Ciudad Merliot, Santa Tecla

==== 3rd place match ====
26 May 2024; 14:20	Report	Brazil	30–9	Colombia	Polideportivo de Ciudad Merliot, Santa Tecla
26 May 2024; 14:20	Report	Score by quarters: 8–1, 9–3, 8–3, 5–2			Polideportivo de Ciudad Merliot, Santa Tecla

==== Final ====
26 May 2024; 17:00	Report	United States	10–7	Canada	Polideportivo de Ciudad Merliot, Santa Tecla
26 May 2024; 17:00	Report	Score by quarters: 2–2, 3–3, 5–2, 0–0			Polideportivo de Ciudad Merliot, Santa Tecla

== Final standings ==
Rank	Team
1st place, gold medalist(s)	United States
2nd place, silver medalist(s)	Canada
3rd place, bronze medalist(s)	Brazil
4	Colombia
5	Argentina
6	Uruguay
7	Mexico
8	El Salvador

Qualified for the 2025 World Aquatics Men's U20 Water Polo Championships
