= 2025 Pan American U17 Water Polo Championship – Men's tournament =

Tournament details
- Host country: Colombia
- City: Medellín
- Venue: 1 (in 1 host city)
- Dates: 19–25 May
- Teams: 11 (from 1 confederation)

Final positions
- Champions: Canada (1st title)
- Runners-up: Brazil
- Third place: United States
- Fourth place: Colombia

Official website
- medellin2025

The 2025 Pan American U17 Water Polo Championship – Men's tournament was the 7th edition of the Pan American under-17 men's water polo championship and a part of the 2025 Pan American Aquatics Championships, organized by the PanAm Aquatics. The event was held in Medellín, Colombia, from 19 to 25 May 2025.

Players born in 2008 or later were eligible to participate.

== Format ==
Eleven teams entered the championship. In the first round, the teams were drawn into two round-robin groups. The top four teams from each group advanced to the final round, which was played in a knock-out system with consolation playoffs and classification matches. The fifth- and sixth-placed teams from the first round groups were dropped to the 9th–11th place classification group.

All times are local (Colombia time; UTC-5).

== First round ==
=== Group A ===
Pos	Team	Pld	W	PSW	PSL	L	GF	GA	GD	Pts	Qualification
1	United States	5	5	0	0	0	89	40	+49	15	Quarterfinals
2	Colombia	5	4	0	0	1	71	51	+20	12	Quarterfinals
3	Argentina	5	3	0	0	2	86	61	+25	9	Quarterfinals
4	Peru	5	2	0	0	3	54	69	−15	6	Quarterfinals
5	Puerto Rico	5	1	0	0	4	50	93	−43	3	9th–11th place classification
6	Mexico	5	0	0	0	5	53	89	−36	0	9th–11th place classification

Source: medellin2025.panamaquaticsevents.com

19 May 2025; 10:20	Report	United States	20–7	Peru	César Zapata Aquatic Complex (Olympic pool), Medellín
19 May 2025; 10:20	Report	Score by quarters: 5–1, 5–1, 2–3, 8–2			César Zapata Aquatic Complex (Olympic pool), Medellín

19 May 2025; 13:00	Report	Mexico	16–17	Puerto Rico	César Zapata Aquatic Complex (Olympic pool), Medellín
19 May 2025; 13:00	Report	Score by quarters: 3–5, 3–4, 4–2, 6–6			César Zapata Aquatic Complex (Olympic pool), Medellín

19 May 2025; 20:00	Report	Colombia	13–12	Argentina	César Zapata Aquatic Complex (Olympic pool), Medellín
19 May 2025; 20:00	Report	Score by quarters: 4–3, 3–3, 3–3, 3–3			César Zapata Aquatic Complex (Olympic pool), Medellín

20 May 2025; 8:00	Report	United States	19–14	Argentina	César Zapata Aquatic Complex (Olympic pool), Medellín
20 May 2025; 8:00	Report	Score by quarters: 4–3, 5–4, 7–2, 3–5			César Zapata Aquatic Complex (Olympic pool), Medellín

20 May 2025; 9:20	Report	Peru	13–9	Puerto Rico	César Zapata Aquatic Complex (Olympic pool), Medellín
20 May 2025; 9:20	Report	Score by quarters: 1–2, 4–3, 5–2, 3–2			César Zapata Aquatic Complex (Olympic pool), Medellín

20 May 2025; 10:40	Report	Colombia	14–10	Mexico	César Zapata Aquatic Complex (Olympic pool), Medellín
20 May 2025; 10:40	Report	Score by quarters: 7–2, 2–1, 2–4, 3–3			César Zapata Aquatic Complex (Olympic pool), Medellín

20 May 2025; 17:40	Report	United States	20–6	Puerto Rico	César Zapata Aquatic Complex (Olympic pool), Medellín
20 May 2025; 17:40	Report	Score by quarters: 7–1, 6–1, 3–2, 4–2			César Zapata Aquatic Complex (Olympic pool), Medellín

20 May 2025; 19:00	Report	Argentina	23–11	Mexico	César Zapata Aquatic Complex (Olympic pool), Medellín
20 May 2025; 19:00	Report	Score by quarters: 7–3, 3–2, 6–2, 7–4			César Zapata Aquatic Complex (Olympic pool), Medellín

20 May 2025; 21:45	Report	Peru	13–16	Colombia	César Zapata Aquatic Complex (Olympic pool), Medellín
20 May 2025; 21:45	Report	Score by quarters: 2–5, 3–4, 2–4, 6–3			César Zapata Aquatic Complex (Olympic pool), Medellín

21 May 2025; 14:40	Report	Mexico	6–21	United States	César Zapata Aquatic Complex (Olympic pool), Medellín
21 May 2025; 14:40	Report	Score by quarters: 1–7, 1–6, 1–4, 3–4			César Zapata Aquatic Complex (Olympic pool), Medellín

21 May 2025; 17:20	Report	Argentina	14–7	Peru	César Zapata Aquatic Complex (Olympic pool), Medellín
21 May 2025; 17:20	Report	Score by quarters: 1–1, 3–1, 4–1, 6–4			César Zapata Aquatic Complex (Olympic pool), Medellín

21 May 2025; 20:00	Report	Puerto Rico	7–21	Colombia	César Zapata Aquatic Complex (Olympic pool), Medellín
21 May 2025; 20:00	Report	Score by quarters: 1–3, 3–7, 1–6, 2–5			César Zapata Aquatic Complex (Olympic pool), Medellín

22 May 2025; 13:20	Report	Mexico	10–14	Peru	César Zapata Aquatic Complex (Olympic pool), Medellín
22 May 2025; 13:20	Report	Score by quarters: 4–2, 1–3, 2–3, 3–6			César Zapata Aquatic Complex (Olympic pool), Medellín

22 May 2025; 14:40	Report	Puerto Rico	11–23	Argentina	César Zapata Aquatic Complex (Olympic pool), Medellín
22 May 2025; 14:40	Report	Score by quarters: 2–2, 1–5, 4–7, 4–9			César Zapata Aquatic Complex (Olympic pool), Medellín

22 May 2025; 16:00	Report	Colombia	7–9	United States	César Zapata Aquatic Complex (Olympic pool), Medellín
22 May 2025; 16:00	Report	Score by quarters: 2–2, 2–3, 2–2, 1–2			César Zapata Aquatic Complex (Olympic pool), Medellín

=== Group B ===
Pos	Team	Pld	W	PSW	PSL	L	GF	GA	GD	Pts	Qualification
1	Brazil	4	4	0	0	0	89	16	+73	12	Quarterfinals
2	Canada	4	3	0	0	1	80	25	+55	9	Quarterfinals
3	Chile	4	2	0	0	2	52	62	−10	6	Quarterfinals
4	Venezuela	4	1	0	0	3	51	86	−35	3	Quarterfinals
5	Costa Rica	4	0	0	0	4	19	102	−83	0	9th–11th place classification

Source: medellin2025.panamaquaticsevents.com

19 May 2025; 15:00	Report	Venezuela	4–32	Canada	César Zapata Aquatic Complex (Olympic pool), Medellín
19 May 2025; 15:00	Report	Score by quarters: 2–8, 0–11, 0–6, 2–7			César Zapata Aquatic Complex (Olympic pool), Medellín

19 May 2025; 17:20	Report	Chile	25–5	Costa Rica	César Zapata Aquatic Complex (Olympic pool), Medellín
19 May 2025; 17:20	Report	Score by quarters: 7–0, 7–4, 4–1, 7–0			César Zapata Aquatic Complex (Olympic pool), Medellín

20 May 2025; 12:00	Report	Brazil	11–6	Canada	César Zapata Aquatic Complex (Olympic pool), Medellín
20 May 2025; 12:00	Report	Score by quarters: 2–3, 3–1, 2–0, 4–2			César Zapata Aquatic Complex (Olympic pool), Medellín

20 May 2025; 13:20	Report	Chile	17–15	Venezuela	César Zapata Aquatic Complex (Olympic pool), Medellín
20 May 2025; 13:20	Report	Score by quarters: 5–3, 6–5, 1–4, 5–3			César Zapata Aquatic Complex (Olympic pool), Medellín

21 May 2025; 9:20	Report	Costa Rica	9–27	Venezuela	César Zapata Aquatic Complex (Olympic pool), Medellín
21 May 2025; 9:20	Report	Score by quarters: 0–8, 5–6, 2–8, 2–5			César Zapata Aquatic Complex (Olympic pool), Medellín

21 May 2025; 12:00	Report	Brazil	22–3	Chile	César Zapata Aquatic Complex (Olympic pool), Medellín
21 May 2025; 12:00	Report	Score by quarters: 6–1, 5–1, 4–1, 7–0			César Zapata Aquatic Complex (Olympic pool), Medellín

22 May 2025; 10:40	Report	Canada	20–7	Chile	César Zapata Aquatic Complex (Olympic pool), Medellín
22 May 2025; 10:40	Report	Score by quarters: 3–3, 6–3, 6–0, 5–1			César Zapata Aquatic Complex (Olympic pool), Medellín

22 May 2025; 12:00	Report	Costa Rica	2–28	Brazil	César Zapata Aquatic Complex (Olympic pool), Medellín
22 May 2025; 12:00	Report	Score by quarters: 1–10, 0–6, 0–8, 1–4			César Zapata Aquatic Complex (Olympic pool), Medellín

22 May 2025; 17:20	Report	Venezuela	5–28	Brazil	César Zapata Aquatic Complex (Olympic pool), Medellín
22 May 2025; 17:20	Report	Score by quarters: 1–7, 2–5, 0–8, 2–8			César Zapata Aquatic Complex (Olympic pool), Medellín

22 May 2025; 20:00	Report	Canada	22–3	Costa Rica	César Zapata Aquatic Complex (Olympic pool), Medellín
22 May 2025; 20:00	Report	Score by quarters: 6–0, 3–0, 8–1, 5–2			César Zapata Aquatic Complex (Olympic pool), Medellín

== 9th–11th place classification ==
Pos	Team	Pld	W	PSW	PSL	L	GF	GA	GD	Pts
9	Puerto Rico	2	2	0	0	0	42	20	+22	6
10	Mexico	2	1	0	0	1	63	27	+36	3
11	Costa Rica	2	0	0	0	2	14	72	−58	0

Source: medellin2025.panamaquaticsevents.com

23 May 2025; 13:30	Report	Mexico	47–10	Costa Rica	César Zapata Aquatic Complex (Olympic pool), Medellín
23 May 2025; 13:30	Report	Score by quarters: 10–3, 11–2, 12–2, 14–3			César Zapata Aquatic Complex (Olympic pool), Medellín

24 May 2025; 13:30	Report	Puerto Rico	25–4	Costa Rica	César Zapata Aquatic Complex (Olympic pool), Medellín
24 May 2025; 13:30	Report	Score by quarters: 8–2, 7–1, 7–0, 3–1			César Zapata Aquatic Complex (Olympic pool), Medellín

== Playoffs ==
=== Bracket ===
5th place match
Argentina	18
Peru	8
7th place match
Venezuela	9(1)
Chile	9(3)

5th–8th place semifinals
Venezuela	11
Argentina	19
Peru	10
Chile	6

Quarterfinals
A1	United States	29
B4	Venezuela	2
A3	Argentina	4
B2	Canada	23
A4	Peru	2
B1	Brazil	18
A2	Colombia	13
B3	Chile	6

Semifinals
United States	11
Canada	17
Brazil	16
Colombia	13

Final
Canada	11
Brazil	10
3rd place match
United States	21
Colombia	9

=== Quarterfinals ===
23 May 2025; 15:00	Report	United States	29–2	Venezuela	César Zapata Aquatic Complex (Olympic pool), Medellín
23 May 2025; 15:00	Report	Score by quarters: 4–0, 10–1, 7–0, 8–1			César Zapata Aquatic Complex (Olympic pool), Medellín

23 May 2025; 16:30	Report	Argentina	4–23	Canada	César Zapata Aquatic Complex (Olympic pool), Medellín
23 May 2025; 16:30	Report	Score by quarters: 2–5, 0–6, 1–5, 1–7			César Zapata Aquatic Complex (Olympic pool), Medellín

23 May 2025; 18:00	Report	Peru	2–18	Brazil	César Zapata Aquatic Complex (Olympic pool), Medellín
23 May 2025; 18:00	Report	Score by quarters: 1–6, 0–2, 1–5, 0–5			César Zapata Aquatic Complex (Olympic pool), Medellín

23 May 2025; 19:30	Report	Colombia	13–6	Chile	César Zapata Aquatic Complex (Olympic pool), Medellín
23 May 2025; 19:30	Report	Score by quarters: 3–2, 6–0, 3–2, 1–2			César Zapata Aquatic Complex (Olympic pool), Medellín

=== 5th–8th place semifinals ===
24 May 2025; 15:00	Report	Venezuela	11–19	Argentina	César Zapata Aquatic Complex (Olympic pool), Medellín
24 May 2025; 15:00	Report	Score by quarters: 3–3, 4–5, 2–3, 2–8			César Zapata Aquatic Complex (Olympic pool), Medellín

24 May 2025; 16:30	Report	Peru	10–6	Chile	César Zapata Aquatic Complex (Olympic pool), Medellín
24 May 2025; 16:30	Report	Score by quarters: 1–3, 3–1, 1–1, 5–1			César Zapata Aquatic Complex (Olympic pool), Medellín

==== 7th place match ====
25 May 2025; 9:00	Report	Venezuela	9–9; PSO: 1–3	Chile	César Zapata Aquatic Complex (Olympic pool), Medellín
25 May 2025; 9:00	Report	Score by quarters: 0–2, 5–1, 0–3, 4–3			César Zapata Aquatic Complex (Olympic pool), Medellín

==== 5th place match ====
25 May 2025; 12:00	Report	Argentina	18–8	Peru	César Zapata Aquatic Complex (Olympic pool), Medellín
25 May 2025; 12:00	Report	Score by quarters: 3–4, 3–0, 6–2, 6–2			César Zapata Aquatic Complex (Olympic pool), Medellín

=== Semifinals ===
24 May 2025; 18:00	Report	United States	11–17	Canada	César Zapata Aquatic Complex (Olympic pool), Medellín
24 May 2025; 18:00	Report	Score by quarters: 2–4, 2–3, 4–4, 3–6			César Zapata Aquatic Complex (Olympic pool), Medellín

24 May 2025; 19:30	Report	Brazil	16–13	Colombia	César Zapata Aquatic Complex (Olympic pool), Medellín
24 May 2025; 19:30	Report	Score by quarters: 3–4, 3–4, 6–2, 4–3			César Zapata Aquatic Complex (Olympic pool), Medellín

==== 3rd place match ====
25 May 2025; 15:00	Report	United States	21–9	Colombia	César Zapata Aquatic Complex (Olympic pool), Medellín
25 May 2025; 15:00	Report	Score by quarters: 6–1, 5–5, 5–1, 5–2			César Zapata Aquatic Complex (Olympic pool), Medellín

==== Final ====
25 May 2025; 18:00	Report	Canada	11–10	Brazil	César Zapata Aquatic Complex (Olympic pool), Medellín
25 May 2025; 18:00	Report	Score by quarters: 1–3, 2–1, 3–2, 5–4			César Zapata Aquatic Complex (Olympic pool), Medellín

== Final standings ==
Rank	Team
1st place, gold medalist(s)	Canada
2nd place, silver medalist(s)	Brazil
3rd place, bronze medalist(s)	United States
4	Colombia
5	Argentina
6	Peru
7	Chile
8	Venezuela
9	Puerto Rico
10	Mexico
11	Costa Rica
