= 2023 Pan American U17 Water Polo Championship – Men's tournament =

Tournament details
- Host country: Brazil
- City: Bauru
- Venue: 1 (in 1 host city)
- Dates: 3–8 April
- Teams: 8 (from 1 confederation)

Final positions
- Champions: United States (3rd title)
- Runners-up: Brazil
- Third place: Argentina
- Fourth place: Canada

Tournament statistics
- Matches played: 24

Official website
- bauru2025

The 2023 Pan American U17 Water Polo Championship – Men's tournament was the sixth edition of the Pan American under-17 men's water polo championship. The event was held, along with the girls' tournament and men's and women's open tournaments, in Bauru, Brazil, from 3 to 8 April 2023.

Players born in 2006 or later were eligible to participate.

== Tournament format ==
Eight teams entered the championship. In the first round, the teams were drawn into two round-robin groups of four. All teams advanced to the final round, which was played in a knock-out format with consolation playoffs and classification matches.

All times are local (Brasília Time; UTC−3).

== First round ==
=== Group A ===
Pos	Team	Pld	W	PSW	PSL	L	GF	GA	GD	Pts
1	Canada	3	3	0	0	0	47	21	26	9
2	Argentina	3	2	0	0	1	44	21	23	6
3	Colombia	3	1	0	0	2	34	28	6	3
4	Mexico	3	0	0	0	3	12	67	−55	0

Source: bauru2023.panamaquaticsevents.com

3 April 2023; 16:00	Report	Mexico	7–20	Colombia	ABDA Arena (indoor pool), Bauru
3 April 2023; 16:00	Report	Score by quarters: 1–4, 1–3, 2–8, 3–5			ABDA Arena (indoor pool), Bauru

3 April 2023; 17:15	Report	Argentina	10–13	Canada	ABDA Arena (indoor pool), Bauru
3 April 2023; 17:15	Report	Score by quarters: 3–5, 2–3, 2–3, 3–2			ABDA Arena (indoor pool), Bauru

4 April 2023; 16:00	Report	Colombia	5–9	Argentina	ABDA Arena (indoor pool), Bauru
4 April 2023; 16:00	Report	Score by quarters: 1–4, 1–1, 2–1, 1–3			ABDA Arena (indoor pool), Bauru

4 April 2023; 17:15	Report	Canada	22–2	Mexico	ABDA Arena (indoor pool), Bauru
4 April 2023; 17:15	Report	Score by quarters: 1–0, 8–0, 4–2, 9–0			ABDA Arena (indoor pool), Bauru

5 April 2023; 16:00	Report	Mexico	3–25	Argentina	ABDA Arena (indoor pool), Bauru
5 April 2023; 16:00	Report	Score by quarters: 2–4, 1–7, 0–5, 0–9			ABDA Arena (indoor pool), Bauru

5 April 2023; 17:15	Report	Canada	12–9	Colombia	ABDA Arena (indoor pool), Bauru
5 April 2023; 17:15	Report	Score by quarters: 4–3, 2–1, 3–2, 3–3			ABDA Arena (indoor pool), Bauru

=== Group B ===
Pos	Team	Pld	W	PSW	PSL	L	GF	GA	GD	Pts
1	United States	3	3	0	0	0	62	15	47	9
2	Brazil (H)	3	2	0	0	1	53	19	34	6
3	Chile	3	1	0	0	2	11	47	−36	3
4	Venezuela	3	0	0	0	3	12	57	−45	0

Source: bauru2023.panamaquaticsevents.com
(H) Hosts

3 April 2023; 18:30	Report	Venezuela	4–27	United States	ABDA Arena (indoor pool), Bauru
3 April 2023; 18:30	Report	Score by quarters: 0–9, 0–6, 2–5, 2–7			ABDA Arena (indoor pool), Bauru

3 April 2023; 19:45	Report	Chile	2–21	Brazil	ABDA Arena (indoor pool), Bauru
3 April 2023; 19:45	Report	Score by quarters: 1–6, 1–6, 0–5, 0–4			ABDA Arena (indoor pool), Bauru

4 April 2023; 18:30	Report	United States	20–2	Chile	ABDA Arena (indoor pool), Bauru
4 April 2023; 18:30	Report	Score by quarters: 5–1, 7–0, 4–0, 4–1			ABDA Arena (indoor pool), Bauru

4 April 2023; 19:45	Report	Brazil	23–2	Venezuela	ABDA Arena (indoor pool), Bauru
4 April 2023; 19:45	Report	Score by quarters: 7–0, 6–1, 6–1, 4–0			ABDA Arena (indoor pool), Bauru

5 April 2023; 18:30	Report	Venezuela	6–7	Chile	ABDA Arena (indoor pool), Bauru
5 April 2023; 18:30	Report	Score by quarters: 0–2, 3–1, 0–2, 3–2			ABDA Arena (indoor pool), Bauru

5 April 2023; 19:45	Report	Brazil	9–15	United States	ABDA Arena (indoor pool), Bauru
5 April 2023; 19:45	Report	Score by quarters: 1–1, 2–3, 4–6, 2–5			ABDA Arena (indoor pool), Bauru

== Playoffs ==
=== Brackets ===
5th place match
Colombia	7 (4)
Chile	7 (3)
7th place match
Venezuela	11
Mexico	9

5th–8th place semifinals
Venezuela	6
Colombia	17
Chile	10
Mexico	5

Quarterfinals
A1	Canada	16
B4	Venezuela	3
A3	Colombia	8
B2	Brazil	19
A2	Argentina	25
B3	Chile	3
A4	Mexico	2
B1	United States	14

Semifinals
Canada	10
Brazil	17
Argentina	7
United States	17

Final
Brazil	9
United States	19
3rd place match
Canada	5
Argentina	15

=== Quarterfinals ===
6 April 2023; 9:00	Report	Argentina	25–3	Chile	ABDA Arena (indoor pool), Bauru
6 April 2023; 9:00	Report	Score by quarters: 6–0, 6–0, 7–2, 6–1			ABDA Arena (indoor pool), Bauru

6 April 2023; 10:20	Report	Colombia	8–19	Brazil	ABDA Arena (indoor pool), Bauru
6 April 2023; 10:20	Report	Score by quarters: 2–4, 2–7, 3–4, 1–4			ABDA Arena (indoor pool), Bauru

6 April 2023; 11:40	Report	Canada	16–3	Venezuela	ABDA Arena (indoor pool), Bauru
6 April 2023; 11:40	Report	Score by quarters: 4–1, 6–0, 3–1, 3–1			ABDA Arena (indoor pool), Bauru

6 April 2023; 13:00	Report	Mexico	2–14	United States	ABDA Arena (indoor pool), Bauru
6 April 2023; 13:00	Report	Score by quarters: 0–8, 0–3, 1–1, 1–2			ABDA Arena (indoor pool), Bauru

=== 5th–8th place semifinals ===
7 April 2023; 9:00	Report	Chile	10–5	Mexico	ABDA Arena (indoor pool), Bauru
7 April 2023; 9:00	Report	Score by quarters: 4–1, 2–1, 3–1, 1–2			ABDA Arena (indoor pool), Bauru

7 April 2023; 10:30	Report	Colombia	17–6	Venezuela	ABDA Arena (indoor pool), Bauru
7 April 2023; 10:30	Report	Score by quarters: 5–2, 7–2, 1–1, 4–1			ABDA Arena (indoor pool), Bauru

==== 7th place match ====
8 April 2023; 9:00	Report	Mexico	9–11	Venezuela	ABDA Arena (indoor pool), Bauru
8 April 2023; 9:00	Report	Score by quarters: 3–3, 3–1, 2–4, 1–3			ABDA Arena (indoor pool), Bauru

==== 5th place match ====
8 April 2023; 10:30	Report	Chile	7–7; PSO: 3–4	Colombia	ABDA Arena (indoor pool), Bauru
8 April 2023; 10:30	Report	Score by quarters: 3–2, 2–5, 0–0, 2–0			ABDA Arena (indoor pool), Bauru

=== Championship semifinals ===
7 April 2023; 18:00	Report	Argentina	7–17	United States	ABDA Arena (indoor pool), Bauru
7 April 2023; 18:00	Report	Score by quarters: 4–5, 1–6, 1–4, 1–2			ABDA Arena (indoor pool), Bauru

7 April 2023; 19:15	Report	Canada	10–17	Brazil	ABDA Arena (indoor pool), Bauru
7 April 2023; 19:15	Report	Score by quarters: 4–6, 1–4, 4–3, 1–4			ABDA Arena (indoor pool), Bauru

==== 3rd place match ====
8 April 2023; 13:30	Report	Canada	5–15	Argentina	ABDA Arena (indoor pool), Bauru
8 April 2023; 13:30	Report	Score by quarters: 0–5, 0–2, 2–6, 3–2			ABDA Arena (indoor pool), Bauru

==== Final ====
8 April 2023; 14:45	Report	Brazil	9–19	United States	ABDA Arena (indoor pool), Bauru
8 April 2023; 14:45	Report	Score by quarters: 1–5, 1–7, 4–5, 3–2			ABDA Arena (indoor pool), Bauru

== Final standings ==
Rank	Team
1st place, gold medalist(s)	United States
2nd place, silver medalist(s)	Brazil
3rd place, bronze medalist(s)	Argentina
4	Canada
5	Colombia
6	Chile
7	Venezuela
8	Mexico
