= 2026 World Aquatics Men's U18 Water Polo Championships =

Water polo tournament held in Rio Maior, Portugal

Tournament details
- Host country: Portugal
- City: Rio Maior
- Venue: 1 (in 1 host city)
- Dates: 27 June – 4 July 2026
- Teams: 20 (from 5 confederations)

Final positions
- Champions: Croatia (2nd title)
- Runners-up: United States
- Third place: Spain
- Fourth place: Montenegro

Official website
- Rio Maior 2026

The 2026 World Aquatics Men's U18 Water Polo Championships was the seventh edition of the biannual tournament for under-18 men's national water polo teams across the world, organized by the world's governing aquatics body, World Aquatics. The tournament was played from 27 June to 4 July 2026 in Rio Maior, Portugal.

20 teams participated in the tournament. Croatia secured their second overall title with a penalty shootout victory over United States in the final, 14(7)–14(6).

== Hosts selection ==
Rio Maior in Portugal was given the hosting rights on 7 January 2026. This was the first time the country hosted the event.

=== Quotes ===
"We firmly believe that Portugal, and Rio Maior in particular, offer all the necessary conditions to deliver a competition of excellence, worthy of the prestige of this event. It is also a great honour to welcome the world’s best male water polo players in this age category – young talents who represent the future of the sport and who, in the near future, will shape the international water polo landscape. Hosting them means actively contributing to the history and development of the sport."

— Miguel Arrobas, president of the Portuguese Swimming Federation.

== Participating teams ==
Africa

- South Africa

Americas

- Argentina
- Brazil
- Canada
- Colombia
- United States

Asia

- China
- Hong Kong
- Singapore

Europe

- Croatia
- Greece
- Hungary
- Italy
- Montenegro
- Portugal (Hosts)
- Serbia
- Spain
- Turkey

Oceania

- Australia
- New Zealand

== Format ==
The 20 teams were divided in two divisions. The top eight teams made Division 1 and the other 12 Division 2. Division 1 was split into two groups of four teams, while Division 2 was split into four groups of three teams. The top two teams from each group of Division 1 advanced directly to the quarterfinals, while the bottom two teams from each group played against Division 2 group winners in the crossover round. Starting with quarterfinals onward, the regular knock-out system with consolation playoffs and final classification matches was used.

== Draw ==
The draw took place on 8 May 2026.

All times are local (Western European Summer Time; UTC+1).

== Group stage ==
=== Division 1 ===
==== Group A ====
Pos	Team	Pld	W	PSW	PSL	L	GF	GA	GD	Pts	Qualification
1	Montenegro	3	3	0	0	0	50	38	12	9	Quarterfinals
2	Croatia	3	2	0	0	1	39	36	3	6	Quarterfinals
3	Hungary	3	1	0	0	2	39	42	−3	3	Crossover 2
4	Serbia	3	0	0	0	3	34	46	−12	0	Crossover 2

Source: results.microplustimingservices.com
Rules for classification: 1) points; 2) head-to-head points; 3) head-to-head goal difference; 4) head-to-head number of goals scored; 5) Goal difference.

27 June 2026; 15:00	Report	Croatia	12–16	Montenegro	Rio Maior Sports Centre, Rio Maior
27 June 2026; 15:00	Report	Score by quarters: 2–3, 3–2, 2–6, 5–5			Rio Maior Sports Centre, Rio Maior

27 June 2026; 18:00	Report	Hungary	17–10	Serbia	Rio Maior Sports Centre, Rio Maior
27 June 2026; 18:00	Report	Score by quarters: 4–0, 5–4, 5–2, 5–4			Rio Maior Sports Centre, Rio Maior

28 June 2026; 15:00	Report	Croatia	12–9	Hungary	Rio Maior Sports Centre, Rio Maior
28 June 2026; 15:00	Report	Score by quarters: 3–1, 3–3, 4–2, 2–3			Rio Maior Sports Centre, Rio Maior

28 June 2026; 18:00	Report	Montenegro	14–13	Serbia	Rio Maior Sports Centre, Rio Maior
28 June 2026; 18:00	Report	Score by quarters: 5–4, 4–5, 4–3, 1–1			Rio Maior Sports Centre, Rio Maior

29 June 2026; 13:30	Report	Hungary	13–20	Montenegro	Rio Maior Sports Centre, Rio Maior
29 June 2026; 13:30	Report	Score by quarters: 2–5, 6–6, 3–5, 2–4			Rio Maior Sports Centre, Rio Maior

29 June 2026; 16:30	Report	Croatia	15–11	Serbia	Rio Maior Sports Centre, Rio Maior
29 June 2026; 16:30	Report	Score by quarters: 4–3, 5–5, 5–2, 1–1			Rio Maior Sports Centre, Rio Maior

==== Group B ====
Pos	Team	Pld	W	PSW	PSL	L	GF	GA	GD	Pts	Qualification
1	Spain	3	3	0	0	0	48	22	26	9	Quarterfinals
2	United States	3	2	0	0	1	44	34	10	6	Quarterfinals
3	Italy	3	1	0	0	2	51	38	13	3	Crossover 2
4	China	3	0	0	0	3	21	70	−49	0	Crossover 2

Source: results.microplustimingservices.com
Rules for classification: 1) points; 2) head-to-head points; 3) head-to-head goal difference; 4) head-to-head number of goals scored; 5) Goal difference.

27 June 2026; 16:30	Report	China	9–21	United States	Rio Maior Sports Centre, Rio Maior
27 June 2026; 16:30	Report	Score by quarters: 2–4, 1–5, 3–4, 3–8			Rio Maior Sports Centre, Rio Maior

27 June 2026; 19:30	Report	Spain	13–12	Italy	Rio Maior Sports Centre, Rio Maior
27 June 2026; 19:30	Report	Score by quarters: 3–3, 3–2, 3–2, 4–5			Rio Maior Sports Centre, Rio Maior

28 June 2026; 13:30	Report	China	4–20	Spain	Rio Maior Sports Centre, Rio Maior
28 June 2026; 13:30	Report	Score by quarters: 0–5, 0–5, 3–6, 1–4			Rio Maior Sports Centre, Rio Maior

28 June 2026; 16:30	Report	United States	17–10	Italy	Rio Maior Sports Centre, Rio Maior
28 June 2026; 16:30	Report	Score by quarters: 2–0, 5–3, 5–3, 5–4			Rio Maior Sports Centre, Rio Maior

29 June 2026; 15:00	Report	Spain	15–6	United States	Rio Maior Sports Centre, Rio Maior
29 June 2026; 15:00	Report	Score by quarters: 5–2, 2–3, 4–0, 4–1			Rio Maior Sports Centre, Rio Maior

29 June 2026; 18:00	Report	China	8–29	Italy	Rio Maior Sports Centre, Rio Maior
29 June 2026; 18:00	Report	Score by quarters: 2–8, 2–8, 4–7, 0–6			Rio Maior Sports Centre, Rio Maior

=== Division 2 ===
==== Group C ====
Pos	Team	Pld	W	PSW	PSL	L	GF	GA	GD	Pts	Qualification
1	New Zealand	2	2	0	0	0	39	24	15	6	Crossover 1
2	Singapore	2	1	0	0	1	28	28	0	3	13th–20th place classification
3	Colombia	2	0	0	0	2	27	42	−15	0	13th–20th place classification

Source: results.microplustimingservices.com
Rules for classification: 1) points; 2) head-to-head points; 3) head-to-head goal difference; 4) head-to-head number of goals scored; 5) Goal difference.

27 June 2026; 9:00	Report	Colombia	12–26	New Zealand	Rio Maior Sports Centre, Rio Maior
27 June 2026; 9:00	Report	Score by quarters: 2–8, 3–7, 3–5, 4–6			Rio Maior Sports Centre, Rio Maior

28 June 2026; 12:00	Report	Singapore	12–13	New Zealand	Rio Maior Sports Centre, Rio Maior
28 June 2026; 12:00	Report	Score by quarters: 1–2, 5–3, 4–4, 2–4			Rio Maior Sports Centre, Rio Maior

29 June 2026; 10:30	Report	Colombia	15–16	Singapore	Rio Maior Sports Centre, Rio Maior
29 June 2026; 10:30	Report	Score by quarters: 2–6, 5–6, 6–2, 2–2			Rio Maior Sports Centre, Rio Maior

==== Group D ====
Pos	Team	Pld	W	PSW	PSL	L	GF	GA	GD	Pts	Qualification
1	Turkey	2	2	0	0	0	40	15	25	6	Crossover 1
2	Brazil	2	1	0	0	1	29	17	12	3	13th–20th place classification
3	Hong Kong	2	0	0	0	2	11	48	−37	0	13th–20th place classification

Source: results.microplustimingservices.com
Rules for classification: 1) points; 2) head-to-head points; 3) head-to-head goal difference; 4) head-to-head number of goals scored; 5) Goal difference.

27 June 2026; 10:30	Report	Turkey	11–10	Brazil	Rio Maior Sports Centre, Rio Maior
27 June 2026; 10:30	Report	Score by quarters: 3–3, 2–0, 3–3, 3–4			Rio Maior Sports Centre, Rio Maior

28 June 2026; 9:00	Report	Hong Kong	6–19	Brazil	Rio Maior Sports Centre, Rio Maior
28 June 2026; 9:00	Report	Score by quarters: 1–2, 1–5, 3–5, 1–7			Rio Maior Sports Centre, Rio Maior

29 June 2026; 12:00	Report	Turkey	29–5	Hong Kong	Rio Maior Sports Centre, Rio Maior
29 June 2026; 12:00	Report	Score by quarters: 6–0, 8–1, 6–3, 9–1			Rio Maior Sports Centre, Rio Maior

==== Group E ====
Pos	Team	Pld	W	PSW	PSL	L	GF	GA	GD	Pts	Qualification
1	Greece	2	2	0	0	0	56	17	39	6	Crossover 1
2	Australia	2	1	0	0	1	34	29	5	3	13th–20th place classification
3	South Africa	2	0	0	0	2	11	55	−44	0	13th–20th place classification

Source: results.microplustimingservices.com
Rules for classification: 1) points; 2) head-to-head points; 3) head-to-head goal difference; 4) head-to-head number of goals scored; 5) Goal difference.

27 June 2026; 12:00	Report	South Africa	6–22	Australia	Rio Maior Sports Centre, Rio Maior
27 June 2026; 12:00	Report	Score by quarters: 0–10, 2–5, 2–3, 2–4			Rio Maior Sports Centre, Rio Maior

28 June 2026; 10:30	Report	Greece	23–12	Australia	Rio Maior Sports Centre, Rio Maior
28 June 2026; 10:30	Report	Score by quarters: 4–0, 6–5, 6–5, 7–2			Rio Maior Sports Centre, Rio Maior

29 June 2026; 9:00	Report	South Africa	5–33	Greece	Rio Maior Sports Centre, Rio Maior
29 June 2026; 9:00	Report	Score by quarters: 1–7, 2–10, 1–11, 1–5			Rio Maior Sports Centre, Rio Maior

==== Group F ====
Pos	Team	Pld	W	PSW	PSL	L	GF	GA	GD	Pts	Qualification
1	Canada	2	2	0	0	0	31	20	11	6	Crossover 1
2	Portugal (H)	2	1	0	0	1	25	26	−1	3	13th–20th place classification
3	Argentina	2	0	0	0	2	19	29	−10	0	13th–20th place classification

Source: results.microplustimingservices.com
Rules for classification: 1) points; 2) head-to-head points; 3) head-to-head goal difference; 4) head-to-head number of goals scored; 5) Goal difference.
(H) Hosts

27 June 2026; 13:30	Report	Argentina	8–16	Canada	Rio Maior Sports Centre, Rio Maior
27 June 2026; 13:30	Report	Score by quarters: 1–5, 3–5, 3–2, 1–4			Rio Maior Sports Centre, Rio Maior

28 June 2026; 19:30	Report	Portugal	12–15	Canada	Rio Maior Sports Centre, Rio Maior
28 June 2026; 19:30	Report	Score by quarters: 2–2, 1–5, 6–5, 3–3			Rio Maior Sports Centre, Rio Maior

29 June 2026; 19:30	Report	Argentina	11–13	Portugal	Rio Maior Sports Centre, Rio Maior
29 June 2026; 19:30	Report	Score by quarters: 2–2, 3–2, 4–6, 2–3			Rio Maior Sports Centre, Rio Maior

== 13th–20th place classification ==
=== Group G ===
Pos	Team	Pld	W	PSW	PSL	L	GF	GA	GD	Pts	Qualification
1	Brazil	3	3	0	0	0	68	27	41	9	13th place match
2	Colombia	3	2	0	0	1	41	52	−11	6	15th place match
3	South Africa	3	1	0	0	2	45	55	−10	3	17th place match
4	Portugal (H)	3	0	0	0	3	25	45	−20	0	19th place match

Source: results.microplustimingservices.com
Rules for classification: 1) points; 2) head-to-head points; 3) head-to-head goal difference; 4) head-to-head number of goals scored; 5) Goal difference.
(H) Hosts

30 June 2026; 10:30	Report	Colombia	7–26	Brazil	Rio Maior Sports Centre, Rio Maior
30 June 2026; 10:30	Report	Score by quarters: 2–4, 1–7, 3–6, 1–9			Rio Maior Sports Centre, Rio Maior

30 June 2026; 12:00	Report	South Africa	15–9	Portugal	Rio Maior Sports Centre, Rio Maior
30 June 2026; 12:00	Report	Score by quarters: 6–3, 3–1, 4–3, 2–2			Rio Maior Sports Centre, Rio Maior

1 July 2026; 9:00	Report	South Africa	15–20	Colombia	Rio Maior Sports Centre, Rio Maior
1 July 2026; 9:00	Report	Score by quarters: 3–6, 4–5, 3–4, 5–5			Rio Maior Sports Centre, Rio Maior

1 July 2026; 10:30	Report	Portugal	5–16	Brazil	Rio Maior Sports Centre, Rio Maior
1 July 2026; 10:30	Report	Score by quarters: 0–3, 2–2, 1–8, 2–3			Rio Maior Sports Centre, Rio Maior

2 July 2026; 9:00	Report	South Africa	15–26	Brazil	Rio Maior Sports Centre, Rio Maior
2 July 2026; 9:00	Report	Score by quarters: 5–5, 2–3, 4–8, 4–10			Rio Maior Sports Centre, Rio Maior

2 July 2026; 10:30	Report	Colombia	14–11	Portugal	Rio Maior Sports Centre, Rio Maior
2 July 2026; 10:30	Report	Score by quarters: 2–2, 5–4, 6–2, 1–3			Rio Maior Sports Centre, Rio Maior

=== Group H ===
Pos	Team	Pld	W	PSW	PSL	L	GF	GA	GD	Pts	Qualification
1	Australia	3	3	0	0	0	90	15	75	9	13th place match
2	Singapore	3	2	0	0	1	47	41	6	6	15th place match
3	Argentina	3	1	0	0	2	34	53	−19	3	17th place match
4	Hong Kong	3	0	0	0	3	20	82	−62	0	19th place match

Source: results.microplustimingservices.com
Rules for classification: 1) points; 2) head-to-head points; 3) head-to-head goal difference; 4) head-to-head number of goals scored; 5) Goal difference.

30 June 2026; 13:30	Report	Singapore	19–12	Hong Kong	Rio Maior Sports Centre, Rio Maior
30 June 2026; 13:30	Report	Score by quarters: 5–4, 5–3, 6–3, 3–2			Rio Maior Sports Centre, Rio Maior

30 June 2026; 15:00	Report	Australia	29–3	Argentina	Rio Maior Sports Centre, Rio Maior
30 June 2026; 15:00	Report	Score by quarters: 6–2, 9–0, 8–0, 6–1			Rio Maior Sports Centre, Rio Maior

1 July 2026; 12:00	Report	Australia	22–10	Singapore	Rio Maior Sports Centre, Rio Maior
1 July 2026; 12:00	Report	Score by quarters: 5–1, 4–1, 9–5, 4–3			Rio Maior Sports Centre, Rio Maior

1 July 2026; 13:30	Report	Argentina	24–6	Hong Kong	Rio Maior Sports Centre, Rio Maior
1 July 2026; 13:30	Report	Score by quarters: 7–2, 6–3, 5–0, 6–1			Rio Maior Sports Centre, Rio Maior

2 July 2026; 12:00	Report	Singapore	18–7	Argentina	Rio Maior Sports Centre, Rio Maior
2 July 2026; 12:00	Report	Score by quarters: 3–2, 2–0, 8–2, 5–3			Rio Maior Sports Centre, Rio Maior

2 July 2026; 13:30	Report	Australia	39–2	Hong Kong	Rio Maior Sports Centre, Rio Maior
2 July 2026; 13:30	Report	Score by quarters: 9–1, 12–0, 9–1, 9–0			Rio Maior Sports Centre, Rio Maior

=== 19th place match ===
3 July 2026; 9:00	Report	Hong Kong	9–20	Portugal	Rio Maior Sports Centre, Rio Maior
3 July 2026; 9:00	Report	Score by quarters: 0–2, 4–4, 5–7, 0–7			Rio Maior Sports Centre, Rio Maior

=== 17th place match ===
3 July 2026; 10:30	Report	Argentina	10–11	South Africa	Rio Maior Sports Centre, Rio Maior
3 July 2026; 10:30	Report	Score by quarters: 3–2, 3–3, 1–2, 3–4			Rio Maior Sports Centre, Rio Maior

=== 15th place match ===
4 July 2026; 9:00	Report	Singapore	22–19	Colombia	Rio Maior Sports Centre, Rio Maior
4 July 2026; 9:00	Report	Score by quarters: 4–1, 4–8, 7–4, 7–6			Rio Maior Sports Centre, Rio Maior

=== 13th place match ===
4 July 2026; 10:30	Report	Australia	18–14	Brazil	Rio Maior Sports Centre, Rio Maior
4 July 2026; 10:30	Report	Score by quarters: 6–3, 3–4, 5–2, 4–5			Rio Maior Sports Centre, Rio Maior

== Crossover 1 ==
In Crossover 1, the four advancing teams from Division 2 each played a seeding match. Continuing in Crossover 2, the winners of these ties played against fourth-placed teams from Division 1, while the losers played against third-placed teams from Division 1.

30 June 2026; 16:30	Report	Turkey	11–10	New Zealand	Rio Maior Sports Centre, Rio Maior
30 June 2026; 16:30	Report	Score by quarters: 3–0, 3–3, 4–3, 1–4			Rio Maior Sports Centre, Rio Maior

30 June 2026; 18:00	Report	Greece	30–9	Canada	Rio Maior Sports Centre, Rio Maior
30 June 2026; 18:00	Report	Score by quarters: 3–0, 3–3, 4–3, 1–4			Rio Maior Sports Centre, Rio Maior

== Knockout round ==
=== Brackets ===
==== Main bracket ====
Crossover 2
1 July
Greece	30
China	8
1 July
New Zealand	13
Hungary	25
1 July
Turkey	12
Serbia	19
1 July
Canada	13
Italy	26

Quarterfinals
2 July
Montenegro	10
Greece	8
2 July
United States	12
Hungary	11
2 July
Spain	16
Serbia	10
2 July
Croatia	12
Italy	11

Semifinals
3 July
Montenegro	13
United States	17
3 July
Spain	(14) 3
Croatia	(14) 4

Final
4 July
United States	(14) 6
Croatia	(14) 7
3rd place match
4 July
Montenegro	12
Spain	13

==== 5th place bracket ====
5th–8th place semifinals
3 July
Greece	18
Hungary	13
3 July
Serbia	18
Italy	15

5th place match
4 July
Greece	13
Serbia	8
7th place match
4 July
Hungary	16
Italy	13

==== 9th place bracket ====
9th–12th place semifinals
3 July
New Zealand	13
China	8
3 July
Canada	15
Turkey	19

9th place match
4 July
New Zealand	15
Turkey	14
11th place match
4 July
China	14
Canada	15

=== Crossover 2 ===
1 July 2026; 15:00	Report	New Zealand	13–25	Hungary	Rio Maior Sports Centre, Rio Maior
1 July 2026; 15:00	Report	Score by quarters: 3–7, 3–4, 3–7, 4–7			Rio Maior Sports Centre, Rio Maior

1 July 2026; 16:30	Report	Canada	13–26	Italy	Rio Maior Sports Centre, Rio Maior
1 July 2026; 16:30	Report	Score by quarters: 3–7, 3–4, 3–7, 4–7			Rio Maior Sports Centre, Rio Maior

1 July 2026; 18:00	Report	Turkey	12–19	Serbia	Rio Maior Sports Centre, Rio Maior
1 July 2026; 18:00	Report	Score by quarters: 4–4, 2–5, 1–5, 5–5			Rio Maior Sports Centre, Rio Maior

1 July 2026; 19:30	Report	Greece	30–8	China	Rio Maior Sports Centre, Rio Maior
1 July 2026; 19:30	Report	Score by quarters: 9–1, 10–4, 6–2, 5–1			Rio Maior Sports Centre, Rio Maior

=== 9th–12th place semifinals ===
3 July 2026; 12:00	Report	New Zealand	13–8	China	Rio Maior Sports Centre, Rio Maior
3 July 2026; 12:00	Report	Score by quarters: 3–3, 3–1, 5–2, 2–2			Rio Maior Sports Centre, Rio Maior

3 July 2026; 13:30	Report	Canada	15–19	Turkey	Rio Maior Sports Centre, Rio Maior
3 July 2026; 13:30	Report	Score by quarters: 5–5, 5–5, 2–5, 2–5			Rio Maior Sports Centre, Rio Maior

==== 11th place match ====
4 July 2026; 12:00	Report	China	14–15	Canada	Rio Maior Sports Centre, Rio Maior
4 July 2026; 12:00	Report	Score by quarters: 3–3, 4–2, 4–4, 3–6			Rio Maior Sports Centre, Rio Maior

==== 9th place match ====
4 July 2026; 13:30	Report	New Zealand	15–14	Turkey	Rio Maior Sports Centre, Rio Maior
4 July 2026; 13:30	Report	Score by quarters: 4–3, 3–3, 2–3, 6–5			Rio Maior Sports Centre, Rio Maior

=== Quarterfinals ===
2 July 2026; 15:00	Report	Montenegro	10–8	Greece	Rio Maior Sports Centre, Rio Maior
2 July 2026; 15:00	Report	Score by quarters: 4–1, 2–3, 2–3, 2–1			Rio Maior Sports Centre, Rio Maior

2 July 2026; 16:30	Report	Spain	16–10	Serbia	Rio Maior Sports Centre, Rio Maior
2 July 2026; 16:30	Report	Score by quarters: 5–1, 4–3, 5–3, 2–3			Rio Maior Sports Centre, Rio Maior

2 July 2026; 18:00	Report	Croatia	12–11	Italy	Rio Maior Sports Centre, Rio Maior
2 July 2026; 18:00	Report	Score by quarters: 2–2, 3–2, 3–5, 4–2			Rio Maior Sports Centre, Rio Maior

2 July 2026; 19:30	Report	United States	12–11	Hungary	Rio Maior Sports Centre, Rio Maior
2 July 2026; 19:30	Report	Score by quarters: 2–2, 3–2, 3–5, 4–2			Rio Maior Sports Centre, Rio Maior

=== 5th–8th place semifinals ===
3 July 2026; 15:00	Report	Greece	18–13	Hungary	Rio Maior Sports Centre, Rio Maior
3 July 2026; 15:00	Report	Score by quarters: 3–3, 4–2, 4–4, 3–6			Rio Maior Sports Centre, Rio Maior

3 July 2026; 16:30	Report	Serbia	18–15	Italy	Rio Maior Sports Centre, Rio Maior
3 July 2026; 16:30	Report	Score by quarters: 5–3, 6–7, 2–2, 5–3			Rio Maior Sports Centre, Rio Maior

==== 7th place match ====
4 July 2026; 15:00	Report	Hungary	16–13	Italy	Rio Maior Sports Centre, Rio Maior
4 July 2026; 15:00	Report	Score by quarters: 6–4, 3–4, 1–3, 6–2			Rio Maior Sports Centre, Rio Maior

==== 5th place match ====
4 July 2026; 16:30	Report	Greece	13–8	Serbia	Rio Maior Sports Centre, Rio Maior
4 July 2026; 16:30	Report	Score by quarters: 5–1, 5–3, 0–2, 3–2			Rio Maior Sports Centre, Rio Maior

=== Semifinals ===
3 July 2026; 18:00	Report	Montenegro	13–17	United States	Rio Maior Sports Centre, Rio Maior
3 July 2026; 18:00	Report	Score by quarters: 1–2, 4–5, 3–6, 5–4			Rio Maior Sports Centre, Rio Maior

3 July 2026; 19:30	Report	Spain	14–14; PSO: 3–4	Croatia	Rio Maior Sports Centre, Rio Maior
3 July 2026; 19:30	Report	Score by quarters: 4–4, 4–4, 2–3, 4–3			Rio Maior Sports Centre, Rio Maior

==== 3rd place match ====
4 July 2026; 18:00	Report	Montenegro	12–13	Spain	Rio Maior Sports Centre, Rio Maior
4 July 2026; 18:00	Report	Score by quarters: 4–3, 2–4, 2–3, 4–3			Rio Maior Sports Centre, Rio Maior

==== Final ====
4 July 2026; 19:30	Report	United States	14–14; PSO: 6–7	Croatia	Rio Maior Sports Centre, Rio Maior
4 July 2026; 19:30	Report	Score by quarters: 4–6, 3–2, 4–4, 3–2			Rio Maior Sports Centre, Rio Maior

== Final standings ==
Rank	Team
1st place, gold medalist(s)	Croatia
2nd place, silver medalist(s)	United States
3rd place, bronze medalist(s)	Spain
4	Montenegro
5	Greece
6	Serbia
7	Hungary
8	Italy
9	New Zealand
10	Turkey
11	Canada
12	China
13	Australia
14	Brazil
15	Singapore
16	Colombia
17	South Africa
18	Argentina
19	Portugal
20	Hong Kong

== Awards ==
- goalkeeper of the tournament: Croatia Nikša Batoš
- coach of the tournament: Croatia Nikola Koljanin

== Squads ==
- Croatia
  - Nikola Batoš (captain), Duje Burazin, Nikola Ferić, Toni Galušić, Petar Erenda, Filip Rogić, Mihael Mladineo, Matej Šorić, Dominik Beljan, Nardo Skejić, Nardo Dragaš, Marin Bajurin, Ivano Lončar, Toma Drobac and Deni Sappe. Coach: Hrvoje Koljanin.
