= Water polo at the 2010 South American Games =

- Venue: Piscina Olímpica Horacio Martínez de Copacabana
- Dates: March 20–25

Water polo at the 2010 South American Games in Medellín was held from March 20 to March 25. All games were played at Piscina Olímpica Horacio Martínez de Copacabana.

Argentina won the men's tournament. Brazil won the women's tournament.

== Medal summary ==
=== Medal table ===
Rank	Nation	Gold	Silver	Bronze	Total
1	Argentina (ARG)	1	0	1	2
1	Brazil (BRA)	1	0	1	2
3	Colombia (COL)	0	1	0	1
3	Venezuela (VEN)	0	1	0	1
Totals (4 entries)		2	2	2	6

== Men ==
=== First round ===
Team	W	D	L	Pts
Argentina	5	0	0	10
Brazil	3	1	1	7
Colombia	3	1	1	7
Venezuela	2	0	3	6
Ecuador	0	1	4	1
Peru	0	1	4	1

20-03-2010	Argentina	24–1	Ecuador	Piscina Olímpica Horacio Martínez de Copacabana

20-03-2010	Brazil	10–4	Venezuela	Piscina Olímpica Horacio Martínez de Copacabana

20-03-2010	Colombia	21–3	Peru	Piscina Olímpica Horacio Martínez de Copacabana

21-03-2010	Ecuador	3–29	Brazil	Piscina Olímpica Horacio Martínez de Copacabana

21-03-2010	Venezuela	17–3	Peru	Piscina Olímpica Horacio Martínez de Copacabana

21-03-2010	Argentina	8–7	Colombia	Piscina Olímpica Horacio Martínez de Copacabana

22-03-2010	Peru	1–25	Brazil	Piscina Olímpica Horacio Martínez de Copacabana

22-03-2010	Venezuela	6–13	Argentina	Piscina Olímpica Horacio Martínez de Copacabana

22-03-2010	Colombia	26–3	Ecuador	Piscina Olímpica Horacio Martínez de Copacabana

22-03-2010	Argentina	20–5	Peru	Piscina Olímpica Horacio Martínez de Copacabana

22-03-2010	Ecuador	3–20	Venezuela	Piscina Olímpica Horacio Martínez de Copacabana

22-03-2010	Brazil	12–12	Colombia	Piscina Olímpica Horacio Martínez de Copacabana

23-03-2010	Brazil	6–7	Argentina	Piscina Olímpica Horacio Martínez de Copacabana

23-03-2010	Peru	8–8	Ecuador	Piscina Olímpica Horacio Martínez de Copacabana

23-03-2010	Colombia	9–8	Venezuela	Piscina Olímpica Horacio Martínez de Copacabana

=== 5th/6th Placement ===
24-03-2010	Peru	7–6	Ecuador	Piscina Olímpica Horacio Martínez de Copacabana

=== Semifinals ===
24-03-2010	Argentina	8–7	Venezuela	Piscina Olímpica Horacio Martínez de Copacabana

24-03-2010	Brazil	4–6	Colombia	Piscina Olímpica Horacio Martínez de Copacabana

=== Bronze-medal match ===
25-03-2010	Venezuela	3–11	Brazil	Piscina Olímpica Horacio Martínez de Copacabana

=== Gold-medal match ===
25-03-2010	Argentina	8–7	Colombia	Piscina Olímpica Horacio Martínez de Copacabana

== Women ==
=== First round ===
Team	W	L	Pts
Brazil	3	0	6
Argentina	2	1	4
Venezuela	1	2	2
Colombia	0	3	0

20-03-2010	Argentina	9–12	Brazil	Piscina Olímpica Horacio Martínez de Copacabana

20-03-2010	Colombia	9–10	Venezuela	Piscina Olímpica Horacio Martínez de Copacabana

21-03-2010	Venezuela	7–9	Argentina	Piscina Olímpica Horacio Martínez de Copacabana

21-03-2010	Brazil	14–6	Colombia	Piscina Olímpica Horacio Martínez de Copacabana

22-03-2010	Brazil	10–4	Venezuela	Piscina Olímpica Horacio Martínez de Copacabana

22-03-2010	Argentina	11–7	Colombia	Piscina Olímpica Horacio Martínez de Copacabana

=== Semifinals ===
23-03-2010	Brazil	15–6	Colombia	Piscina Olímpica Horacio Martínez de Copacabana

23-03-2010	Argentina	9–10	Venezuela	Piscina Olímpica Horacio Martínez de Copacabana

=== Bronze-medal match ===
23-03-2010	Colombia	8–13	Argentina	Piscina Olímpica Horacio Martínez de Copacabana

=== Gold-medal match ===
23-03-2010	Brazil	15–4	Venezuela	Piscina Olímpica Horacio Martínez de Copacabana
