= 2024 World Aquatics Men's U18 Water Polo Championships =

Youth men's water polo tournament

Tournament details
- Host country: Argentina
- City: Buenos Aires
- Venue: 1 (in 1 host city)
- Dates: 2–9 July 2024
- Teams: 20 (from 5 confederations)

Final positions
- Champions: Hungary (3rd title)
- Runners-up: Serbia
- Third place: Montenegro
- Fourth place: Italy

Tournament statistics
- Matches played: 62
- Top scorer: (Turkey) Efe Naipoglu (27 goals)

Awards
- Best player: (Serbia) Strahinja Krstic
- Best goalkeeper: (Hungary) David Szitas

The 2024 World Aquatics Men's U18 Water Polo Championships was the 6th edition of the men's U18 Water Polo Championship. The tournament was played in Buenos Aires, Argentina, from 2 to 9 July 2024. Hungary were the defending champions. Hungary won their third title after beating Serbia in the final, 12–10.

== Hosts selection ==
On 7 December 2023, Argentina was given the hosting rights.

== Teams ==
Africa

- South Africa

Americas

- Argentina (hosts)
- Brazil
- Canada
- Colombia
- Uruguay
- United States

Asia

- China
- Iran
- Japan
- Kazakhstan

Europe

- Croatia
- Greece
- Hungary
- Italy
- Montenegro
- Serbia
- Spain

Oceania

- Australia
- New Zealand

== Venue ==
The venue is the Olympic Park Natatorium in Buenos Aires.

2024 World Aquatics Men's U18 Water Polo Championships is located in Argentina	Buenos Aires
2024 World Aquatics Men's U18 Water Polo Championships is located in Argentina	Olympic Park Natatorium
2024 World Aquatics Men's U18 Water Polo Championships is located in Argentina	Capacity: Unknown

== Format ==
The 20 teams were divided into two divisions. The top eight teams made Division 1 and the other twelve teams Division 2. Division 1 were split into two groups of four teams while Division 2 was split into four groups of three. The top two teams from each group of Division 1 advanced directly to the quarterfinals, while the other two teams from each group played against one of the group winners from each group in Division 2 in the crossover round. Starting with quarterfinals onward, the regular knock-out system was used.

== Group stage ==
=== Division 1 ===
==== Group A ====
Pos	Team	Pld	W	PSW	PSL	L	GF	GA	GD	Pts	Qualification
1	Serbia	3	2	1	0	0	46	38	+8	8	Quarterfinals
2	Hungary	3	2	0	0	1	41	35	+6	6	Quarterfinals
3	Montenegro	3	1	0	1	1	35	34	+1	4	Crossover 2
4	United States	3	0	0	0	3	37	52	−15	0	Crossover 2

Source: World Aquatics
Rules for classification: 1) points; 2) head-to-head points; 3) head-to-head goal difference; 4) head-to-head number of goals scored; 5) Goal difference.

2 July 2024; 13:30	Report	United States	11–13	Montenegro	Olympic Park Natatorium, Buenos Aires
2 July 2024; 13:30	Report	Score by quarters: 2–5, 3–4, 4–2, 2–2			Olympic Park Natatorium, Buenos Aires

2 July 2024; 19:00	Report	Serbia	13–12	Hungary	Olympic Park Natatorium, Buenos Aires
2 July 2024; 19:00	Report	Score by quarters: 2–3, 3–2, 4–2, 4–5			Olympic Park Natatorium, Buenos Aires

3 July 2024; 17:30	Report	United States	13–20	Serbia	Olympic Park Natatorium, Buenos Aires
3 July 2024; 17:30	Report	Score by quarters: 3–6, 5–6, 4–4, 1–4			Olympic Park Natatorium, Buenos Aires

3 July 2024; 20:30	Report	Montenegro	9–10	Hungary	Olympic Park Natatorium, Buenos Aires
3 July 2024; 20:30	Report	Score by quarters: 2–2, 3–2, 3–3, 1–3			Olympic Park Natatorium, Buenos Aires

4 July 2024; 16:00	Report	Serbia	18–16 (PSO)	Montenegro	Olympic Park Natatorium, Buenos Aires
4 July 2024; 16:00	Report	Score by quarters: 4–1, 1–4, 5–5, 3–3 PSO: 5–3			Olympic Park Natatorium, Buenos Aires

4 July 2024; 19:00	Report	United States	13–19	Hungary	Olympic Park Natatorium, Buenos Aires
4 July 2024; 19:00	Report	Score by quarters: 4–4, 4–4, 3–6, 2–5			Olympic Park Natatorium, Buenos Aires

==== Group B ====
Pos	Team	Pld	W	PSW	PSL	L	GF	GA	GD	Pts	Qualification
1	Italy	3	3	0	0	0	31	25	+6	9	Quarterfinals
2	Croatia	3	1	1	0	1	34	36	−2	5	Quarterfinals
3	Greece	3	1	0	0	2	33	33	0	3	Crossover 2
4	Spain	3	0	0	1	2	31	35	−4	1	Crossover 2

Source: World Aquatics
Rules for classification: 1) points; 2) head-to-head points; 3) head-to-head goal difference; 4) head-to-head number of goals scored; 5) Goal difference.

2 July 2024; 17:30	Report	Greece	13–10	Spain	Olympic Park Natatorium, Buenos Aires
2 July 2024; 17:30	Report	Score by quarters: 4–0, 3–3, 3–3, 3–4			Olympic Park Natatorium, Buenos Aires

2 July 2024; 20:30	Report	Italy	12–8	Croatia	Olympic Park Natatorium, Buenos Aires
2 July 2024; 20:30	Report	Score by quarters: 3–2, 1–1, 3–3, 5–2			Olympic Park Natatorium, Buenos Aires

3 July 2024; 16:00	Report	Greece	9–10	Italy	Olympic Park Natatorium, Buenos Aires
3 July 2024; 16:00	Report	Score by quarters: 1–4, 2–1, 3–2, 3–3			Olympic Park Natatorium, Buenos Aires

3 July 2024; 19:00	Report	Spain	23–24 (PSO)	Croatia	Olympic Park Natatorium, Buenos Aires
3 July 2024; 19:00	Report	Score by quarters: 4–1, 6–3, 0–4, 3–5 PSO: 10–11			Olympic Park Natatorium, Buenos Aires

4 July 2024; 17:30	Report	Italy	9–8	Spain	Olympic Park Natatorium, Buenos Aires
4 July 2024; 17:30	Report	Score by quarters: 3–2, 1–2, 3–3, 2–1			Olympic Park Natatorium, Buenos Aires

4 July 2024; 20:30	Report	Greece	11–13	Croatia	Olympic Park Natatorium, Buenos Aires
4 July 2024; 20:30	Report	Score by quarters: 4–2, 4–3, 1–6, 2–2			Olympic Park Natatorium, Buenos Aires

=== Division 2 ===
==== Group C ====
Pos	Team	Pld	W	PSW	PSL	L	GF	GA	GD	Pts	Qualification
1	Turkey	2	2	0	0	0	38	20	+18	6	Crossover 1
2	Canada	2	0	1	0	1	29	36	−7	2	Classification round
3	China	2	0	0	1	1	23	34	−11	1	Classification round

Source: World Aquatics
Rules for classification: 1) points; 2) head-to-head points; 3) head-to-head goal difference; 4) head-to-head number of goals scored; 5) Goal difference.

2 July 2024; 09:00	Report	China	7–18	Turkey	Olympic Park Natatorium, Buenos Aires
2 July 2024; 09:00	Report	Score by quarters: 1–3, 2–5, 3–5, 1–5			Olympic Park Natatorium, Buenos Aires

3 July 2024; 12:00	Report	Canada	13–20	Turkey	Olympic Park Natatorium, Buenos Aires
3 July 2024; 12:00	Report	Score by quarters: 2–5, 4–5, 4–5, 3–5			Olympic Park Natatorium, Buenos Aires

4 July 2024; 12:00	Report	China	18–20 (PSO)	Canada	Olympic Park Natatorium, Buenos Aires
4 July 2024; 12:00	Report	Score by quarters: 2–2, 3–5, 5–7, 6–2 PSO: 2–4			Olympic Park Natatorium, Buenos Aires

==== Group D ====
Pos	Team	Pld	W	PSW	PSL	L	GF	GA	GD	Pts	Qualification
1	Brazil	2	2	0	0	0	38	13	+25	6	Crossover 1
2	Argentina (H)	2	1	0	0	1	33	20	+13	3	Classification round
3	Uruguay	2	0	0	0	2	9	47	−38	0	Classification round

Source: World Aquatics
Rules for classification: 1) points; 2) head-to-head points; 3) head-to-head goal difference; 4) head-to-head number of goals scored; 5) Goal difference.
(H) Host

2 July 2024; 16:00	Report	Argentina	25–4	Uruguay	Olympic Park Natatorium, Buenos Aires
2 July 2024; 16:00	Report	Score by quarters: 7–1, 5–1, 7–2, 6–0			Olympic Park Natatorium, Buenos Aires

3 July 2024; 13:30	Report	Brazil	22–5	Uruguay	Olympic Park Natatorium, Buenos Aires
3 July 2024; 13:30	Report	Score by quarters: 5–1, 5–0, 8–1, 4–3			Olympic Park Natatorium, Buenos Aires

4 July 2024; 13:30	Report	Brazil	16–8	Argentina	Olympic Park Natatorium, Buenos Aires
4 July 2024; 13:30	Report	Score by quarters: 3–1, 2–1, 6–4, 5–2			Olympic Park Natatorium, Buenos Aires

==== Group E ====
Pos	Team	Pld	W	PSW	PSL	L	GF	GA	GD	Pts	Qualification
1	New Zealand	2	2	0	0	0	35	25	+10	6	Crossover 1
2	Japan	2	1	0	0	1	41	42	−1	3	Classification round
3	Colombia	2	0	0	0	2	26	35	−9	0	Classification round

Source: World Aquatics
Rules for classification: 1) points; 2) head-to-head points; 3) head-to-head goal difference; 4) head-to-head number of goals scored; 5) Goal difference.

2 July 2024; 10:30	Report	Japan	23–19	Colombia	Olympic Park Natatorium, Buenos Aires
2 July 2024; 10:30	Report	Score by quarters: 8–4, 6–5, 4–5, 5–5			Olympic Park Natatorium, Buenos Aires

3 July 2024; 09:00	Report	New Zealand	12–7	Colombia	Olympic Park Natatorium, Buenos Aires
3 July 2024; 09:00	Report	Score by quarters: 3–3, 4–1, 3–2, 2–1			Olympic Park Natatorium, Buenos Aires

4 July 2024; 09:00	Report	Japan	18–23	New Zealand	Olympic Park Natatorium, Buenos Aires
4 July 2024; 09:00	Report	Score by quarters: 5–5, 6–6, 3–8, 4–4			Olympic Park Natatorium, Buenos Aires

==== Group F ====
Pos	Team	Pld	W	PSW	PSL	L	GF	GA	GD	Pts	Qualification
1	Australia	2	2	0	0	0	34	26	+8	6	Crossover 1
2	Kazakhstan	2	1	0	0	1	23	22	+1	3	Classification round
3	South Africa	2	0	0	0	2	21	30	−9	0	Classification round

Source: World Aquatics
Rules for classification: 1) points; 2) head-to-head points; 3) head-to-head goal difference; 4) head-to-head number of goals scored; 5) Goal difference.

2 July 2024; 12:00	Report	Australia	14–13	Kazakhstan	Olympic Park Natatorium, Buenos Aires
2 July 2024; 12:00	Report	Score by quarters: 3–4, 4–3, 2–1, 5–5			Olympic Park Natatorium, Buenos Aires

3 July 2024; 10:30	Report	South Africa	8–10	Kazakhstan	Olympic Park Natatorium, Buenos Aires
3 July 2024; 10:30	Report	Score by quarters: 0–2, 3–3, 2–4, 3–1			Olympic Park Natatorium, Buenos Aires

4 July 2024; 10:30	Report	Australia	20–13	South Africa	Olympic Park Natatorium, Buenos Aires
4 July 2024; 10:30	Report	Score by quarters: 6–2, 6–4, 3–5, 5–2			Olympic Park Natatorium, Buenos Aires

== Classification round ==
=== Group G ===
Pos	Team	Pld	W	PSW	PSL	L	GF	GA	GD	Pts	Qualification
1	Canada	3	3	0	0	0	58	42	+16	9	13th place match
2	Japan	3	2	0	0	1	56	50	+6	6	15th place match
3	South Africa	3	1	0	0	2	48	46	+2	3	17th place match
4	Uruguay	3	0	0	0	3	32	56	−24	0	19th place match

Source: World Aquatics
Rules for classification: 1) points; 2) head-to-head points; 3) head-to-head goal difference; 4) head-to-head number of goals scored; 5) Goal difference.

5 July 2024; 10:30	Report	Canada	23–13	Uruguay	Olympic Park Natatorium, Buenos Aires
5 July 2024; 10:30	Report	Score by quarters: 6–4, 7–5, 3–1, 7–3			Olympic Park Natatorium, Buenos Aires

5 July 2024; 12:00	Report	Japan	23–19	South Africa	Olympic Park Natatorium, Buenos Aires
5 July 2024; 12:00	Report	Score by quarters: 8–3, 3–4, 5–8, 7–4			Olympic Park Natatorium, Buenos Aires

6 July 2024; 09:00	Report	Japan	16–17	Canada	Olympic Park Natatorium, Buenos Aires
6 July 2024; 09:00	Report	Score by quarters: 3–4, 4–3, 5–6, 4–4			Olympic Park Natatorium, Buenos Aires

6 July 2024; 10:30	Report	South Africa	16–5	Uruguay	Olympic Park Natatorium, Buenos Aires
6 July 2024; 10:30	Report	Score by quarters: 4–2, 5–0, 5–2, 2–1			Olympic Park Natatorium, Buenos Aires

7 July 2024; 09:00	Report	Canada	18–13	South Africa	Olympic Park Natatorium, Buenos Aires
7 July 2024; 09:00	Report	Score by quarters: 6–1, 3–4, 5–5, 4–3			Olympic Park Natatorium, Buenos Aires

7 July 2024; 10:30	Report	Japan	17–14	Uruguay	Olympic Park Natatorium, Buenos Aires
7 July 2024; 10:30	Report	Score by quarters: 5–3, 4–2, 6–3, 2–6			Olympic Park Natatorium, Buenos Aires

=== Group H ===
Pos	Team	Pld	W	PSW	PSL	L	GF	GA	GD	Pts	Qualification
1	Argentina (H)	3	2	1	0	0	40	33	+7	8	13th place match
2	Kazakhstan	3	2	0	1	0	39	25	+14	7	15th place match
3	China	3	1	0	0	2	32	38	−6	3	17th place match
4	Colombia	3	0	0	0	3	25	40	−15	0	19th place match

Source: World Aquatics
Rules for classification: 1) points; 2) head-to-head points; 3) head-to-head goal difference; 4) head-to-head number of goals scored; 5) Goal difference.
(H) Host

5 July 2024; 13:30	Report	China	13–14	Argentina	Olympic Park Natatorium, Buenos Aires
5 July 2024; 13:30	Report	Score by quarters: 4–2, 2–5, 5–5, 2–2			Olympic Park Natatorium, Buenos Aires

5 July 2024; 15:00	Report	Colombia	6–14	Kazakhstan	Olympic Park Natatorium, Buenos Aires
5 July 2024; 15:00	Report	Score by quarters: 1–4, 1–2, 2–3, 2–5			Olympic Park Natatorium, Buenos Aires

6 July 2024; 12:00	Report	Colombia	9–10	China	Olympic Park Natatorium, Buenos Aires
6 July 2024; 12:00	Report	Score by quarters: 0–3, 1–2, 3–3, 5–2			Olympic Park Natatorium, Buenos Aires

6 July 2024; 13:30	Report	Kazakhstan	14–15 (PSO)	Argentina	Olympic Park Natatorium, Buenos Aires
6 July 2024; 13:30	Report	Score by quarters: 3–3, 2–3, 3–2, 2–2 PSO: 4–5			Olympic Park Natatorium, Buenos Aires

7 July 2024; 12:00	Report	China	9–15	Kazakhstan	Olympic Park Natatorium, Buenos Aires
7 July 2024; 12:00	Report	Score by quarters: 4–2, 1–3, 2–5, 2–5			Olympic Park Natatorium, Buenos Aires

7 July 2024; 13:30	Report	Colombia	10–16	Argentina	Olympic Park Natatorium, Buenos Aires
7 July 2024; 13:30	Report	Score by quarters: 4–3, 2–3, 3–5, 1–5			Olympic Park Natatorium, Buenos Aires

=== Placement matches ===
==== Nineteenth place game ====
8 July 2024; 09:00	Report	Uruguay	10–22	Colombia	Olympic Park Natatorium, Buenos Aires
8 July 2024; 09:00	Report	Score by quarters: 2–5, 4–4, 4–6, 0–7			Olympic Park Natatorium, Buenos Aires

==== Seventeenth place game ====
8 July 2024; 10:30	Report	South Africa	8–17	China	Olympic Park Natatorium, Buenos Aires
8 July 2024; 10:30	Report	Score by quarters: 2–7, 1–6, 2–3, 3–1			Olympic Park Natatorium, Buenos Aires

==== Fifteenth place game ====
9 July 2024; 09:00	Report	Japan	23–25 (PSO)	Kazakhstan	Olympic Park Natatorium, Buenos Aires
9 July 2024; 09:00	Report	Score by quarters: 2–4, 6–6, 6–3, 6–7 PSO: 3–5			Olympic Park Natatorium, Buenos Aires

==== Thirteenth place game ====
9 July 2024; 10:30	Report	Canada	9–16	Argentina	Olympic Park Natatorium, Buenos Aires
9 July 2024; 10:30	Report	Score by quarters: 2–2, 3–4, 2–5, 2–5			Olympic Park Natatorium, Buenos Aires

== Knockout stage ==
=== Crossover 1 ===
The four advancing teams from Division 2 played each in a crossover match. The winners of both ties play a fourth place team while the losers play a team that placed third.

5 July 2024; 16:30	Report	Brazil	15–13 (PSO)	Turkey	Olympic Park Natatorium, Buenos Aires
5 July 2024; 16:30	Report	Score by quarters: 2–1, 2–3, 2–2, 5–5 PSO: 4–2			Olympic Park Natatorium, Buenos Aires

5 July 2024; 18:00	Report	New Zealand	5–12	Australia	Olympic Park Natatorium, Buenos Aires
5 July 2024; 18:00	Report	Score by quarters: 1–3, 1–2, 3–1, 0–6			Olympic Park Natatorium, Buenos Aires

=== Brackets ===
==== Main bracket ====
Crossover 2
6 July
Australia	10
Spain	24
6 July
Turkey	8
Montenegro	11
6 July
Brazil	9
United States	13
6 July
New Zealand	9
Greece	24

Quarterfinals
7 July
Serbia	17
Spain	16
7 July
Croatia	9
Montenegro	14
7 July
Italy	14
United States	10
7 July
Hungary	13
Greece	12

Semifinals
8 July
Serbia	13
Montenegro	9
8 July
Italy	15
Hungary	18

Final
9 July
Serbia	10
Hungary	12
Third place game
9 July
Montenegro	12
Italy	11

=== Crossover 2 ===
6 July 2024; 16:00	Report	Turkey	8–11	Montenegro	Olympic Park Natatorium, Buenos Aires
6 July 2024; 16:00	Report	Score by quarters: 2–2, 3–3, 1–3, 2–3			Olympic Park Natatorium, Buenos Aires

6 July 2024; 17:30	Report	New Zealand	9–24	Greece	Olympic Park Natatorium, Buenos Aires
6 July 2024; 17:30	Report	Score by quarters: 3–4, 1–6, 1–5, 4–9			Olympic Park Natatorium, Buenos Aires

6 July 2024; 19:00	Report	Brazil	9–13	United States	Olympic Park Natatorium, Buenos Aires
6 July 2024; 19:00	Report	Score by quarters: 3–3, 3–2, 2–5, 1–3			Olympic Park Natatorium, Buenos Aires

6 July 2024; 20:30	Report	Australia	10–24	Spain	Olympic Park Natatorium, Buenos Aires
6 July 2024; 20:30	Report	Score by quarters: 1–6, 3–4, 3–8, 3–6			Olympic Park Natatorium, Buenos Aires

=== Quarterfinals ===
7 July 2024; 16:00	Report	Serbia	17–16	Spain	Olympic Park Natatorium, Buenos Aires
7 July 2024; 16:00	Report	Score by quarters: 4–4, 6–1, 3–4, 4–7			Olympic Park Natatorium, Buenos Aires

7 July 2024; 17:30	Report	Italy	14–10	United States	Olympic Park Natatorium, Buenos Aires
7 July 2024; 17:30	Report	Score by quarters: 3–3, 3–2, 4–0, 4–5			Olympic Park Natatorium, Buenos Aires

7 July 2024; 19:00	Report	Hungary	13–12	Greece	Olympic Park Natatorium, Buenos Aires
7 July 2024; 19:00	Report	Score by quarters: 3–5, 4–2, 4–2, 2–3			Olympic Park Natatorium, Buenos Aires

7 July 2024; 20:30	Report	Croatia	9–14	Montenegro	Olympic Park Natatorium, Buenos Aires
7 July 2024; 20:30	Report	Score by quarters: 3–2, 2–4, 2–3, 2–5			Olympic Park Natatorium, Buenos Aires

=== Semifinals ===
8 July 2024; 19:00	Report	Serbia	13–9	Montenegro	Olympic Park Natatorium, Buenos Aires
8 July 2024; 19:00	Report	Score by quarters: 6–0, 2–2, 1–3, 4–4			Olympic Park Natatorium, Buenos Aires

8 July 2024; 20:30	Report	Italy	15–18	Hungary	Olympic Park Natatorium, Buenos Aires
8 July 2024; 20:30	Report	Score by quarters: 4–7, 4–7, 3–1, 4–3			Olympic Park Natatorium, Buenos Aires

==== Third place game ====
9 July 2024; 18:00	Report	Montenegro	12–11	Italy	Olympic Park Natatorium, Buenos Aires
9 July 2024; 18:00	Report	Score by quarters: 2–2, 6–2, 3–3, 1–4			Olympic Park Natatorium, Buenos Aires

==== Final ====
9 July 2024; 19:30	Report	Serbia	10–12	Hungary	Olympic Park Natatorium, Buenos Aires
9 July 2024; 19:30	Report	Score by quarters: 4–6, 2–1, 2–2, 2–3			Olympic Park Natatorium, Buenos Aires

=== 5th place bracket ===
5th–8th place semifinals
8 July
Spain	18
Croatia	16
8 July
United States	12
Greece	14

Fifth place game
9 July
Spain	15
Greece	11
Seventh place game
9 July
Croatia	13
United States	16

=== 5th–8th place semifinals ===
8 July 2024; 16:00	Report	Spain	18–16	Croatia	Olympic Park Natatorium, Buenos Aires
8 July 2024; 16:00	Report	Score by quarters: 6–4, 6–2, 3–4, 3–6			Olympic Park Natatorium, Buenos Aires

8 July 2024; 17:30	Report	United States	12–14	Greece	Olympic Park Natatorium, Buenos Aires
8 July 2024; 17:30	Report	Score by quarters: 2–6, 4–5, 4–1, 2–2			Olympic Park Natatorium, Buenos Aires

==== Seventh place game ====
9 July 2024; 15:00	Report	Croatia	13–16	United States	Olympic Park Natatorium, Buenos Aires
9 July 2024; 15:00	Report	Score by quarters: 5–5, 2–4, 4–3, 2–4			Olympic Park Natatorium, Buenos Aires

==== Fifth place game ====
9 July 2024; 16:30	Report	Spain	15–11	Greece	Olympic Park Natatorium, Buenos Aires
9 July 2024; 16:30	Report	Score by quarters: 2–2, 3–3, 6–2, 4–4			Olympic Park Natatorium, Buenos Aires

=== 9th place bracket ===
9th–12th place semifinals
8 July
Turkey	9 (3)
Australia (PSO)	9 (4)
8 July
New Zealand	9
Brazil	14

Ninth place game
9 July
Australia	9
Brazil	11
Eleventh place game
9 July
Turkey	16
New Zealand	7

=== 9th–12th place semifinals ===
8 July 2024; 12:00	Report	Turkey	12–13 (PSO)	Australia	Olympic Park Natatorium, Buenos Aires
8 July 2024; 12:00	Report	Score by quarters: 2–3, 2–1, 3–3, 2–2 PSO: 3–4			Olympic Park Natatorium, Buenos Aires

8 July 2024; 13:30	Report	New Zealand	9–14	Brazil	Olympic Park Natatorium, Buenos Aires
8 July 2024; 13:30	Report	Score by quarters: 2–5, 4–4, 3–3, 0–2			Olympic Park Natatorium, Buenos Aires

==== Eleventh place game ====
9 July 2024; 12:00	Report	Turkey	16–7	New Zealand	Olympic Park Natatorium, Buenos Aires
9 July 2024; 12:00	Report	Score by quarters: 3–0, 4–4, 2–2, 7–1			Olympic Park Natatorium, Buenos Aires

==== Ninth place game ====
9 July 2024; 13:30	Report	Australia	9–11	Brazil	Olympic Park Natatorium, Buenos Aires
9 July 2024; 13:30	Report	Score by quarters: 4–3, 1–1, 3–5, 1–2			Olympic Park Natatorium, Buenos Aires

== Final standings ==
Rank	Team
1st place, gold medalist(s)	Hungary
2nd place, silver medalist(s)	Serbia
3rd place, bronze medalist(s)	Montenegro
4	Italy
5	Spain
6	Greece
7	United States
8	Croatia
9	Brazil
10	Australia
11	Turkey
12	New Zealand
13	Argentina
14	Canada
15	Kazakhstan
16	Japan
17	China
18	South Africa
19	Colombia
20	Uruguay
