= 2016 FINA World Men's Youth Water Polo Championships =

International youth men's water polo tournament

Tournament details
- Host country: Montenegro
- City: Podgorica
- Venue: 1 (in 1 host city)
- Dates: 26 August – 3 September 2016
- Teams: 19 (from 5 confederations)

Final positions
- Champions: Croatia (1st title)
- Runners-up: Montenegro
- Third place: Hungary

Official website
- www.worldaquatics.com

The 2016 FINA World Men's Youth Water Polo Championship was the 3rd edition of the U18 men's water polo world championship. The tournament was played in Podgorica, Montenegro, from 26 August to 3 September 2016.

Croatia won their first title after beating Montenegro in the final, 16–13.

== Participating teams ==
Africa

- Egypt
- South Africa

Americas

- Brazil
- Canada
- Colombia
- United States

Asia

- China
- Japan
- Kazakhstan

Europe

- Croatia
- Greece
- Hungary
- Italy
- Montenegro
- Russia
- Serbia
- Spain

Oceania

- Australia
- New Zealand

== Group stage ==
All times are local (Central European Summer Time; UTC+2).

=== Group A ===
Pos	Team	Pld	W	D	L	GF	GA	GD	Pts	Qualification
1	Greece	4	4	0	0	93	33	+60	8	Quarterfinals
2	Russia	4	3	0	1	70	36	+34	6	Playoffs
3	Canada	4	2	0	2	50	61	−11	4	Playoffs
4	Colombia	4	1	0	3	35	82	−47	2	13th–19th place classification
5	Kazakhstan	4	0	0	4	29	65	−36	0	13th–19th place classification

Source: www.worldaquatics.com

26 August 2016; 11:20	Greece	27–10	Canada	Morača Sports Center, Podgorica
26 August 2016; 11:20	Score by quarters: 4–3, 6–4, 9–3, 8–0			Morača Sports Center, Podgorica
26 August 2016; 11:20	Papasifakis 7	Goals	Jones, Reiher 3	Morača Sports Center, Podgorica

26 August 2016; 14:00	Russia	25–5	Colombia	Morača Sports Center, Podgorica
26 August 2016; 14:00	Score by quarters: 5–3, 7–1, 7–1, 6–0			Morača Sports Center, Podgorica
26 August 2016; 14:00	Melentev 6	Goals	Buitrago 4	Morača Sports Center, Podgorica

27 August 2016; 18:20	Canada	9–15	Russia	Morača Sports Center, Podgorica
27 August 2016; 18:20	Score by quarters: 1–4, 3–5, 5–4, 0–2			Morača Sports Center, Podgorica
27 August 2016; 18:20	D'Souza 6	Goals	Melentev 4	Morača Sports Center, Podgorica

27 August 2016; 19:40	Kazakhstan	4–21	Greece	Morača Sports Center, Podgorica
27 August 2016; 19:40	Score by quarters: 1–4, 1–6, 1–5, 1–6			Morača Sports Center, Podgorica
27 August 2016; 19:40	Shvedov 3	Goals	Nikolaidis 7	Morača Sports Center, Podgorica

28 August 2016; 18:20	Colombia	11–17	Canada	Morača Sports Center, Podgorica
28 August 2016; 18:20	Score by quarters: 4–5, 3–3, 3–4, 1–5			Morača Sports Center, Podgorica
28 August 2016; 18:20	Foronda 4	Goals	three players 3	Morača Sports Center, Podgorica

28 August 2016; 19:40	Russia	19–8	Kazakhstan	Morača Sports Center, Podgorica
28 August 2016; 19:40	Score by quarters: 5–2, 6–3, 4–2, 4–1			Morača Sports Center, Podgorica
28 August 2016; 19:40	Shaikhutdinov 6	Goals	three players 2	Morača Sports Center, Podgorica

29 August 2016; 12:40	Kazakhstan	9–11	Colombia	Morača Sports Center, Podgorica
29 August 2016; 12:40	Score by quarters: 1–3, 5–3, 1–3, 2–2			Morača Sports Center, Podgorica
29 August 2016; 12:40	Bogomolov 3	Goals	Munoz 3	Morača Sports Center, Podgorica

29 August 2016; 17:00	Greece	14–11	Russia	Morača Sports Center, Podgorica
29 August 2016; 17:00	Score by quarters: 4–2, 6–3, 2–5, 2–1			Morača Sports Center, Podgorica
29 August 2016; 17:00	Gardikas 7	Goals	Sheikin 4	Morača Sports Center, Podgorica

30 August 2016; 10:00	Colombia	8–31	Greece	Morača Sports Center, Podgorica
30 August 2016; 10:00	Score by quarters: 2–8, 1–8, 2–8, 3–7			Morača Sports Center, Podgorica
30 August 2016; 10:00	Orozco 4	Goals	Nikolaidis 7	Morača Sports Center, Podgorica

30 August 2016; 11:20	Kazakhstan	8–14	Canada	Morača Sports Center, Podgorica
30 August 2016; 11:20	Score by quarters: 3–3, 2–3, 0–6, 3–2			Morača Sports Center, Podgorica
30 August 2016; 11:20	Akhmetov 3	Goals	Carnevale 5	Morača Sports Center, Podgorica

=== Group B ===
Pos	Team	Pld	W	D	L	GF	GA	GD	Pts	Qualification
1	Montenegro (H)	3	2	1	0	50	40	+10	5	Quarterfinals
2	Hungary	3	2	0	1	53	43	+10	4	Playoffs
3	Italy	3	1	1	1	46	40	+6	3	Playoffs
4	Brazil	3	0	0	3	34	60	−26	0	13th–19th place classification

Source: www.worldaquatics.com
(H) Hosts

26 August 2016; 21:00	Italy	15–15	Montenegro	Morača Sports Center, Podgorica
26 August 2016; 21:00	Score by quarters: 1–3, 4–2, 7–4, 3–6			Morača Sports Center, Podgorica
26 August 2016; 21:00	Manzi 7	Goals	Ukropina 4	Morača Sports Center, Podgorica

27 August 2016; 11:40	Brazil	9–18	Italy	Morača Sports Center, Podgorica
27 August 2016; 11:40	Score by quarters: 2–7, 3–4, 2–4, 2–3			Morača Sports Center, Podgorica
27 August 2016; 11:40	Pessin 4	Goals	Manzi 6	Morača Sports Center, Podgorica

27 August 2016; 21:00	Montenegro	16–14	Hungary	Morača Sports Center, Podgorica
27 August 2016; 21:00	Score by quarters: 4–2, 3–3, 6–4, 3–5			Morača Sports Center, Podgorica
27 August 2016; 21:00	Ukropina 4	Goals	Fekete 5	Morača Sports Center, Podgorica

28 August 2016; 21:00	Hungary	23–14	Brazil	Morača Sports Center, Podgorica
28 August 2016; 21:00	Score by quarters: 4–2, 7–2, 7–6, 5–4			Morača Sports Center, Podgorica
28 August 2016; 21:00	Vadovics 5	Goals	Real 10	Morača Sports Center, Podgorica

29 August 2016; 18:20	Italy	13–16	Hungary	Morača Sports Center, Podgorica
29 August 2016; 18:20	Score by quarters: 3–3, 2–4, 5–5, 3–5			Morača Sports Center, Podgorica
29 August 2016; 18:20	Di Martire 5	Goals	Nagy 5	Morača Sports Center, Podgorica

30 August 2016; 21:00	Brazil	11–19	Montenegro	Morača Sports Center, Podgorica
30 August 2016; 21:00	Score by quarters: 1–5, 4–4, 4–4, 2–6			Morača Sports Center, Podgorica
30 August 2016; 21:00	Real 8	Goals	Mijušković 5	Morača Sports Center, Podgorica

=== Group C ===
Pos	Team	Pld	W	D	L	GF	GA	GD	Pts	Qualification
1	Australia	4	4	0	0	54	36	+18	8	Quarterfinals
2	Spain	4	3	0	1	69	40	+29	6	Playoffs
3	Japan	4	2	0	2	81	66	+15	4	Playoffs
4	Egypt	4	1	0	3	36	54	−18	2	13th–19th place classification
5	South Africa	4	0	0	4	42	86	−44	0	13th–19th place classification

Source: www.worldaquatics.com

26 August 2016; 12:40	Spain	8–10	Australia	Morača Sports Center, Podgorica
26 August 2016; 12:40	Score by quarters: 2–3, 3–2, 2–4, 1–1			Morača Sports Center, Podgorica
26 August 2016; 12:40	Granados 5	Goals	Putt 3	Morača Sports Center, Podgorica

26 August 2016; 17:00	South Africa	16–32	Japan	Morača Sports Center, Podgorica
26 August 2016; 17:00	Score by quarters: 3–10, 3–8, 4–8, 6–6			Morača Sports Center, Podgorica
26 August 2016; 17:00	Hamilton 6	Goals	three players 5	Morača Sports Center, Podgorica

27 August 2016; 09:00	Japan	17–23	Spain	Morača Sports Center, Podgorica
27 August 2016; 09:00	Score by quarters: 6–3, 2–7, 4–7, 5–6			Morača Sports Center, Podgorica
27 August 2016; 09:00	Inaba 7	Goals	Granados 10	Morača Sports Center, Podgorica

27 August 2016; 10:20	Egypt	15–6	South Africa	Morača Sports Center, Podgorica
27 August 2016; 10:20	Score by quarters: 4–3, 0–0, 6–2, 5–1			Morača Sports Center, Podgorica
27 August 2016; 10:20	three players 3	Goals	Stewart 2	Morača Sports Center, Podgorica

28 August 2016; 10:00	Australia	14–13	Japan	Morača Sports Center, Podgorica
28 August 2016; 10:00	Score by quarters: 1–3, 5–4, 4–1, 4–5			Morača Sports Center, Podgorica
28 August 2016; 10:00	Elphick 6	Goals	Koppu, Suzuki 3	Morača Sports Center, Podgorica

28 August 2016; 11:20	Spain	14–2	Egypt	Morača Sports Center, Podgorica
28 August 2016; 11:20	Score by quarters: 3–1, 4–0, 2–0, 5–1			Morača Sports Center, Podgorica
28 August 2016; 11:20	Granados 5	Goals	Elafandy, Hesham 1	Morača Sports Center, Podgorica

29 August 2016; 19:40	Egypt	6–15	Australia	Morača Sports Center, Podgorica
29 August 2016; 19:40	Score by quarters: 1–3, 3–3, 1–5, 1–4			Morača Sports Center, Podgorica
29 August 2016; 19:40	El Sherbiny, Ayman 2	Goals	Nangle 4	Morača Sports Center, Podgorica

29 August 2016; 21:00	South Africa	11–24	Spain	Morača Sports Center, Podgorica
29 August 2016; 21:00	Score by quarters: 2–7, 2–6, 2–5, 5–6			Morača Sports Center, Podgorica
29 August 2016; 21:00	Simpson 7	Goals	Granados 8	Morača Sports Center, Podgorica

30 August 2016; 12:40	Australia	15–9	South Africa	Morača Sports Center, Podgorica
30 August 2016; 12:40	Score by quarters: 3–2, 3–4, 5–1, 4–2			Morača Sports Center, Podgorica
30 August 2016; 12:40	Marsden, Putt 3	Goals	van Zyl 3	Morača Sports Center, Podgorica

30 August 2016; 17:00	Egypt	13–19	Japan	Morača Sports Center, Podgorica
30 August 2016; 17:00	Score by quarters: 2–6, 3–4, 3–4, 5–5			Morača Sports Center, Podgorica
30 August 2016; 17:00	Ayman 4	Goals	Yusuke Inaba 6	Morača Sports Center, Podgorica

=== Group D ===
Pos	Team	Pld	W	D	L	GF	GA	GD	Pts	Qualification
1	Serbia	4	4	0	0	65	39	+26	8	Quarterfinals
2	Croatia	4	3	0	1	75	51	+24	6	Playoffs
3	United States	4	2	0	2	61	41	+20	4	Playoffs
4	New Zealand	4	1	0	3	41	70	−29	2	13th–19th place classification
5	China	4	0	0	4	38	79	−41	0	13th–19th place classification

Source: www.worldaquatics.com

26 August 2016; 18:20	Croatia	23–11	New Zealand	Morača Sports Center, Podgorica
26 August 2016; 18:20	Score by quarters: 6–3, 6–0, 6–5, 5–3			Morača Sports Center, Podgorica
26 August 2016; 18:20	Mercep 6	Goals	Morris 3	Morača Sports Center, Podgorica

26 August 2016; 19:40	China	11–21	Serbia	Morača Sports Center, Podgorica
26 August 2016; 19:40	Score by quarters: 1–6, 1–7, 6–5, 3–3			Morača Sports Center, Podgorica
26 August 2016; 19:40	Wei 4	Goals	Lukic 5	Morača Sports Center, Podgorica

27 August 2016; 13:00	Serbia	15–13	Croatia	Morača Sports Center, Podgorica
27 August 2016; 13:00	Score by quarters: 6–3, 3–4, 3–3, 3–3			Morača Sports Center, Podgorica
27 August 2016; 13:00	Jankovic 5	Goals	Pejkovic 6	Morača Sports Center, Podgorica

27 August 2016; 17:00	United States	22–4	China	Morača Sports Center, Podgorica
27 August 2016; 17:00	Score by quarters: 7–2, 7–1, 6–1, 2–0			Morača Sports Center, Podgorica
27 August 2016; 17:00	Daube 6	Goals	four players 1	Morača Sports Center, Podgorica

28 August 2016; 12:40	New Zealand	8–17	Serbia	Morača Sports Center, Podgorica
28 August 2016; 12:40	Score by quarters: 3–5, 1–4, 3–7, 1–1			Morača Sports Center, Podgorica
28 August 2016; 12:40	four players 2	Goals	three players 3	Morača Sports Center, Podgorica

28 August 2016; 17:00	United States	14–16	Croatia	Morača Sports Center, Podgorica
28 August 2016; 17:00	Score by quarters: 4–3, 3–5, 4–5, 3–3			Morača Sports Center, Podgorica
28 August 2016; 17:00	Daube, Molthen 4	Goals	Lazić 5	Morača Sports Center, Podgorica

29 August 2016; 10:00	United States	18–9	New Zealand	Morača Sports Center, Podgorica
29 August 2016; 10:00	Score by quarters: 5–4, 4–1, 6–3, 3–1			Morača Sports Center, Podgorica
29 August 2016; 10:00	Blyashov 4	Goals	Stankovich 3	Morača Sports Center, Podgorica

29 August 2016; 11:20	China	11–23	Croatia	Morača Sports Center, Podgorica
29 August 2016; 11:20	Score by quarters: 0–6, 3–6, 3–6, 5–5			Morača Sports Center, Podgorica
29 August 2016; 11:20	B. Wang 4	Goals	Merčep 3	Morača Sports Center, Podgorica

30 August 2016; 18:20	New Zealand	13–12	China	Morača Sports Center, Podgorica
30 August 2016; 18:20	Score by quarters: 5–1, 2–4, 4–3, 2–4			Morača Sports Center, Podgorica
30 August 2016; 18:20	Dew, Stankovich 4	Goals	B. Wang 5	Morača Sports Center, Podgorica

30 August 2016; 19:40	United States	7–12	Serbia	Morača Sports Center, Podgorica
30 August 2016; 19:40	Score by quarters: 1–3, 0–1, 3–4, 3–4			Morača Sports Center, Podgorica
30 August 2016; 19:40	three players 2	Goals	Jankovic 4	Morača Sports Center, Podgorica

== 13th–19th place classification ==
=== Bracket ===
17th place match
South Africa	8
New Zealand	15
19th place
Colombia

17th–19th place semifinal
Colombia	13
South Africa	14
New Zealand

13th–19th place quarterfinals
A4	Colombia	10
D5	China	12
B4	Brazil	15
C5	South Africa	12
A5	Kazakhstan	10
D4	New Zealand	8
C4	Egypt

13th–16th place semifinals
China	7
Brazil	21
Kazakhstan	7
Egypt	13

13th place match
Brazil	15
Egypt	12
15th place match
China	7
Kazakhstan	13

=== 13th–19th place quarterfinals ===
31 August 2016; 10:00	Report	Colombia	10–12	China	Morača Sports Center, Podgorica
31 August 2016; 10:00	Report	Score by quarters: 3–3, 2–2, 3–3, 2–4			Morača Sports Center, Podgorica

31 August 2016; 11:20	Report	Brazil	15–12	South Africa	Morača Sports Center, Podgorica
31 August 2016; 11:20	Report	Score by quarters: 4–4, 4–4, 4–1, 3–3			Morača Sports Center, Podgorica

31 August 2016; 12:40	Report	Kazakhstan	10–8	New Zealand	Morača Sports Center, Podgorica
31 August 2016; 12:40	Report	Score by quarters: 1–1, 4–3, 2–2, 3–2			Morača Sports Center, Podgorica

=== 17th–19th place semifinal ===
1 September 2016; 9:00	Report	Colombia	13–14 (PSO)	South Africa	Morača Sports Center, Podgorica
1 September 2016; 9:00	Report	Score by quarters: 2–1, 2–6, 2–2, 4–1 PSO: 3–4			Morača Sports Center, Podgorica

==== 17th place match ====
2 September 2016; 9:00	Report	South Africa	8–15	New Zealand	Morača Sports Center, Podgorica
2 September 2016; 9:00	Report	Score by quarters: 1–3, 1–3, 3–4, 3–5			Morača Sports Center, Podgorica

=== 13th–16th place semifinals ===
1 September 2016; 10:20	Report	China	7–21	Brazil	Morača Sports Center, Podgorica
1 September 2016; 10:20	Report	Score by quarters: 3–5, 0–6, 1–5, 3–5			Morača Sports Center, Podgorica

1 September 2016; 11:40	Report	Kazakhstan	7–13	Egypt	Morača Sports Center, Podgorica
1 September 2016; 11:40	Report	Score by quarters: 1–2, 1–3, 1–5, 4–3			Morača Sports Center, Podgorica

==== 15th place match ====
2 September 2016; 10:20	Report	China	7–13	Kazakhstan	Morača Sports Center, Podgorica
2 September 2016; 10:20	Report	Score by quarters: 2–4, 1–4, 2–2, 2–3			Morača Sports Center, Podgorica

==== 13th place match ====
2 September 2016; 11:40	Report	Brazil	15–12	Egypt	Morača Sports Center, Podgorica
2 September 2016; 11:40	Report	Score by quarters: 4–4, 2–3, 1–3, 8–2			Morača Sports Center, Podgorica

== Knockout stage ==
=== Brackets ===
==== Main bracket ====
Playoffs
Hungary	15
Japan	11
Canada	13
Croatia	23
Russia	15
United States	8
Italy	13
Spain	12

Quarterfinals
Greece	17
Hungary	18
Australia	13
Croatia	14
Montenegro	14
Russia	11
Serbia	12
Italy	14

Semifinals
Hungary	17
Croatia	21
Montenegro	11
Italy	10

Final
Croatia	16
Montenegro	13
3rd place match
Hungary	12
Italy	8

==== 5th place bracket ====
5th–8th place semifinals
Greece	13
Australia	9
Russia	7
Serbia	13

5th place match
Greece	19
Serbia	22
7th place match
Australia	8
Russia	9

==== 9th place bracket ====
9th–12th place semifinals
United States	16
Japan	13
Canada	12
Spain	18

9th place match
United States	10
Spain	12
11th place match
Japan	15
Canada	11

=== Playoffs ===
31 August 2016; 17:00	Report	Russia	15–8	United States	Morača Sports Center, Podgorica
31 August 2016; 17:00	Report	Score by quarters: 1–2, 5–3, 4–1, 5–2			Morača Sports Center, Podgorica
31 August 2016; 17:00	Report	Melentev 6	Goals	Vavic 3	Morača Sports Center, Podgorica

31 August 2016; 18:20	Report	Hungary	15–11	Japan	Morača Sports Center, Podgorica
31 August 2016; 18:20	Report	Score by quarters: 3–4, 4–2, 4–2, 4–3			Morača Sports Center, Podgorica
31 August 2016; 18:20	Report	Vadovics 4	Goals	Suzuki 4	Morača Sports Center, Podgorica

31 August 2016; 19:40	Report	Canada	13–23	Croatia	Morača Sports Center, Podgorica
31 August 2016; 19:40	Report	Score by quarters: 4–5, 4–4, 3–7, 2–7			Morača Sports Center, Podgorica
31 August 2016; 19:40	Report	D'Souza 5	Goals	Pejković 5	Morača Sports Center, Podgorica

31 August 2016; 21:00	Report	Italy	13–12	Spain	Morača Sports Center, Podgorica
31 August 2016; 21:00	Report	Score by quarters: 3–4, 4–2, 3–3, 3–3			Morača Sports Center, Podgorica
31 August 2016; 21:00	Report	Manzi 6	Goals	Granados 6	Morača Sports Center, Podgorica

=== 9th–12th place semifinals ===
1 September 2016; 13:00	Report	United States	16–13 (PSO)	Japan	Morača Sports Center, Podgorica
1 September 2016; 13:00	Report	Score by quarters: 3–4, 2–3, 4–1, 4–5 PSO: 3–0			Morača Sports Center, Podgorica

1 September 2016; 14:20	Report	Canada	12–18	Spain	Morača Sports Center, Podgorica
1 September 2016; 14:20	Report	Score by quarters: 3–5, 0–4, 5–4, 4–5			Morača Sports Center, Podgorica

==== 11th place match ====
2 September 2016; 13:00	Report	Japan	15–11	Canada	Morača Sports Center, Podgorica
2 September 2016; 13:00	Report	Score by quarters: 3–0, 3–4, 4–5, 5–2			Morača Sports Center, Podgorica

==== 9th place match ====
2 September 2016; 14:20	Report	United States	10–12	Spain	Morača Sports Center, Podgorica
2 September 2016; 14:20	Report	Score by quarters: 2–2, 3–3, 2–5, 3–2			Morača Sports Center, Podgorica

=== Quarterfinals ===
1 September 2016; 17:00	Report	Greece	17–18 (PSO)	Hungary	Morača Sports Center, Podgorica
1 September 2016; 17:00	Report	Score by quarters: 4–3, 2–4, 4–5, 5–3 PSO: 2–3			Morača Sports Center, Podgorica

1 September 2016; 18:20	Report	Australia	13–14	Croatia	Morača Sports Center, Podgorica
1 September 2016; 18:20	Report	Score by quarters: 4–6, 3–1, 5–4, 1–3			Morača Sports Center, Podgorica

1 September 2016; 19:40	Report	Serbia	12–14 (PSO)	Italy	Morača Sports Center, Podgorica
1 September 2016; 19:40	Report	Score by quarters: 3–1, 4–4, 2–1, 0–3 PSO: 3–5			Morača Sports Center, Podgorica

1 September 2016; 21:00	Report	Montenegro	14–11	Russia	Morača Sports Center, Podgorica
1 September 2016; 21:00	Report	Score by quarters: 3–3, 4–3, 3–2, 4–3			Morača Sports Center, Podgorica

=== 5th–8th place semifinals ===
2 September 2016; 17:00	Report	Greece	13–9	Australia	Morača Sports Center, Podgorica
2 September 2016; 17:00	Report	Score by quarters: 6–1, 2–1, 2–5, 3–2			Morača Sports Center, Podgorica

2 September 2016; 18:20	Report	Russia	7–13	Serbia	Morača Sports Center, Podgorica
2 September 2016; 18:20	Report	Score by quarters: 1–5, 4–4, 2–2, 0–2			Morača Sports Center, Podgorica

==== 7th place match ====
3 September 2016; 17:00	Report	Australia	8–9	Russia	Morača Sports Center, Podgorica
3 September 2016; 17:00	Report	Score by quarters: 3–0, 5–3, 0–2, 0–4			Morača Sports Center, Podgorica

==== 5th place match ====
3 September 2016; 18:20	Report	Greece	19–22	Serbia	Morača Sports Center, Podgorica
3 September 2016; 18:20	Report	Score by quarters: 4–7, 5–5, 6–5, 4–5			Morača Sports Center, Podgorica

=== Semifinals ===
2 September 2016; 19:40	Report	Hungary	17–21	Croatia	Morača Sports Center, Podgorica
2 September 2016; 19:40	Report	Score by quarters: 6–6, 4–6, 4–6, 3–3			Morača Sports Center, Podgorica

2 September 2016; 21:00	Report	Montenegro	11–10	Italy	Morača Sports Center, Podgorica
2 September 2016; 21:00	Report	Score by quarters: 4–3, 3–2, 2–3, 2–2			Morača Sports Center, Podgorica

==== 3rd place match ====
3 September 2016; 19:40	Report	Hungary	12–8	Italy	Morača Sports Center, Podgorica
3 September 2016; 19:40	Report	Score by quarters: 2–1, 2–1, 5–4, 3–2			Morača Sports Center, Podgorica

==== Final ====
3 September 2016; 21:00	Report	Croatia	16–13	Montenegro	Morača Sports Center, Podgorica
3 September 2016; 21:00	Report	Score by quarters: 2–2, 7–5, 2–4, 5–2			Morača Sports Center, Podgorica

== Final standings ==
Rank	Team
1st place, gold medalist(s)	Croatia
2nd place, silver medalist(s)	Montenegro
3rd place, bronze medalist(s)	Hungary
4	Italy
5	Serbia
6	Greece
7	Russia
8	Australia
9	Spain
10	United States
11	Japan
12	Canada
13	Brazil
14	Egypt
15	Kazakhstan
16	China
17	New Zealand
18	South Africa
19	Colombia
