= Water polo at the 2024 Summer Olympics – Men's qualification =

The men's qualification for the Olympic water polo tournament occurred between July 2023 and February 2024, allocating twelve teams for the final tournament. As the host nation, France reserved a direct spot each for the men's team.

The remainder of the total quota was attributed to the eligible NOCs through a tripartite qualification pathway. First, the 2023 World Aquatics Championships, scheduled for 17 to 29 July in Fukuoka, Japan, produced the winners and runners-up of the men's water polo tournament qualifying for Paris 2024. Five more quota places were awarded to the highest-ranked eligible NOC at each of the continental meets (Africa, Americas, Asia, Europe, and Oceania) approved by World Aquatics. If any of the continental qualifying tournaments did not occur within the qualifying period, the vacant spot was entitled to the highest-ranked eligible NOC from a respective continent at the succeeding edition of the Worlds.

The last batch of quota places was assigned to the four highest-ranked eligible NOCs at the 2024 World Aquatics Championships in Doha, Qatar to complete the twelve-team field for the Games.

== Qualification summary ==
Qualification	Date	Host	Berths	Qualified team
Host country	—		1	France
2023 World Aquatics Championships	17–29 July 2023	(Japan) Fukuoka	2	Hungary
2023 World Aquatics Championships	17–29 July 2023	(Japan) Fukuoka	2	Greece
2022 Asian Games	2–7 October 2023	(China) Hangzhou	1	Japan
2023 Pan American Games	30 October – 4 November 2023	(Chile) Santiago	1	United States
2024 European Championships	4–16 January 2024	(Croatia) Dubrovnik/Zagreb	1	Spain
2024 World Aquatics Championships	5–17 February 2024	(Qatar) Doha	4	Croatia
2024 World Aquatics Championships	5–17 February 2024	(Qatar) Doha	4	Italy
2024 World Aquatics Championships	5–17 February 2024	(Qatar) Doha	4	Serbia
2024 World Aquatics Championships	5–17 February 2024	(Qatar) Doha	4	Montenegro
2024 World Aquatics Championships – Africa	5–17 February 2024	(Qatar) Doha	~~1~~	~~South Africa~~
2024 World Aquatics Championships – Oceania	5–17 February 2024	(Qatar) Doha	1	Australia
2024 World Aquatics Championships – Reallocation	5–17 February 2024	(Qatar) Doha	1	Romania (Note: South Africa withdrew from the tournament after the 2024 World Aquatics Championships. Romania, as the best non-qualified team, took their spot.)
Total			12	

== 2023 World Championships ==
The winner and the runner-up of the men's water polo tournament at the 2023 World Aquatics Championships in Fukuoka, Japan obtained a ticket for Paris 2024.

=== Group A ===
Pos	Team	Pld	W	PSW	PSL	L	GF	GA	GD	Pts	Qualification
1	Greece	3	3	0	0	0	46	25	+21	9	Quarterfinals
2	United States	3	2	0	0	1	48	28	+20	6	Playoffs
3	Australia	3	1	0	0	2	39	35	+4	3	Playoffs
4	Kazakhstan	3	0	0	0	3	13	58	−45	0	

Source: Sportresult
Rules for classification: 1) points; 2) head-to-head points; 3) head-to-head goal difference; 4) head-to-head number of goals scored; 5) Goal difference.

=== Group B ===
Pos	Team	Pld	W	PSW	PSL	L	GF	GA	GD	Pts	Qualification
1	Italy	3	3	0	0	0	55	17	+38	9	Quarterfinals
2	France	3	2	0	0	1	38	32	+6	6	Playoffs
3	Canada	3	1	0	0	2	30	49	−19	3	Playoffs
4	China	3	0	0	0	3	23	48	−25	0	

Source: Sportresult
Rules for classification: 1) points; 2) head-to-head points; 3) head-to-head goal difference; 4) head-to-head number of goals scored; 5) Goal difference.

=== Group C ===
Pos	Team	Pld	W	PSW	PSL	L	GF	GA	GD	Pts	Qualification
1	Hungary	3	3	0	0	0	49	31	+18	9	Quarterfinals
2	Croatia	3	2	0	0	1	51	29	+22	6	Playoffs
3	Japan (H)	3	1	0	0	2	40	42	−2	3	Playoffs
4	Argentina	3	0	0	0	3	27	65	−38	0	

Source: Sportresult
Rules for classification: 1) points; 2) head-to-head points; 3) head-to-head goal difference; 4) head-to-head number of goals scored; 5) Goal difference.
(H) Host

=== Group D ===
Pos	Team	Pld	W	PSW	PSL	L	GF	GA	GD	Pts	Qualification
1	Spain	3	3	0	0	0	54	27	+27	9	Quarterfinals
2	Serbia	3	1	1	0	1	57	34	+23	5	Playoffs
3	Montenegro	3	1	0	1	1	55	34	+21	4	Playoffs
4	South Africa	3	0	0	0	3	21	92	−71	0	

Source: Sportresult
Rules for classification: 1) points; 2) head-to-head points; 3) head-to-head goal difference; 4) head-to-head number of goals scored; 5) Goal difference.

=== Bracket ===
Playoffs
23 July
Croatia	12
Montenegro	13
23 July
Japan	10
Serbia	16
23 July
United States	13
Canada	10
23 July
Australia	8
France	11

Quarter-finals
25 July
Greece	10
Montenegro	9
25 July
Italy	11 (3)
Serbia (PSO)	11 (4)
25 July
Hungary	13
United States	12
25 July
Spain	7
France	6

Semi-finals
27 July
Greece	13
Serbia	7
27 July
Hungary	12
Spain	11

Final
29 July
Greece	10 (3)
Hungary (PSO)	10 (4)
Third place
29 July
Serbia	6
Spain	9

5th place bracket

5th–8th place semifinals
27 July
Montenegro	6
Italy	10
27 July
United States	13 (3)
France (PSO)	13 (5)

Fifth place game
29 July
Italy	16
France	9
Seventh place game
29 July
Montenegro	12 (3)
United States (PSO)	12 (5)

9th place bracket

9th–12th place semifinals
25 July
Canada	5
Croatia	13
25 July
Australia	16
Japan	15

Ninth place game
27 July
Croatia	17
Australia	10
Eleventh place game
27 July
Canada	11
Japan	23

13th place bracket

13th–16th place semifinals
23 July
Kazakhstan	12
China	5
23 July
Argentina	15
South Africa	6

13th place game
25 July
Kazakhstan	7
Argentina	11
15th place game
25 July
China	16
South Africa	8

=== Final standing ===
Rank	Team
1st place, gold medalist(s)	Hungary
2nd place, silver medalist(s)	Greece
3rd place, bronze medalist(s)	Spain
4	Serbia
5	Italy
6	France
7	United States
8	Montenegro
9	Croatia
10	Australia
11	Japan
12	Canada
13	Argentina
14	Kazakhstan
15	China
16	South Africa

== Continental tournaments ==
The highest-ranked eligible NOC from each of the five continental qualification tournaments (Africa, Americas, Asia, Europe, and Oceania) secured a quota place for Paris 2024. If any of the continental qualifying tournaments did not occur within the qualifying period, the vacant spot was entitled to the highest-ranked eligible NOC from a respective continent at the succeeding edition of the Worlds.

=== Asia ===
==== Preliminary round ====
Group A

Pos	Team	Pld	W	PW	PL	L	GF	GA	GD	Pts	Qualification
1	China	3	3	0	0	0	57	23	+34	9	Quarterfinals
2	Iran	3	2	0	0	1	48	26	+22	6	Quarterfinals
3	South Korea	3	1	0	0	2	35	37	−2	3	Quarterfinals
4	Thailand	3	0	0	0	3	22	76	−54	0	Quarterfinals

Source: OCA

Group B

Pos	Team	Pld	W	PW	PL	L	GF	GA	GD	Pts	Qualification
1	Japan	3	3	0	0	0	70	24	+46	9	Quarterfinals
2	Kazakhstan	3	2	0	0	1	60	23	+37	6	Quarterfinals
3	Singapore	3	1	0	0	2	20	58	−38	3	Quarterfinals
4	Hong Kong	3	0	0	0	3	18	63	−45	0	Quarterfinals

Source: OCA

==== Bracket ====
Quarterfinals
5 October
Iran	13
Singapore	6
5 October
Thailand	2
Japan	23
5 October
South Korea	8
Kazakhstan	15
5 October
China	23
Hong Kong	3

Semifinals
6 October
Iran	11
Japan	18
6 October
Kazakhstan	10 (3)
China (p)	10 (4)

Gold medal match
7 October
Japan	11
China	7
Bronze medal match
7 October
Iran	7 (2)
Kazakhstan (p)	7 (3)

==== Final standing ====
Rank	Team	Pld	W	PW	PL	L
1st place, gold medalist(s)	Japan	6	6	0	0	0
2nd place, silver medalist(s)	China	6	4	1	0	1
3rd place, bronze medalist(s)	Kazakhstan	6	3	1	1	1
4	Iran	6	3	0	1	2
5	Singapore	6	3	0	0	3
6	South Korea	6	2	0	0	4
7	Hong Kong	6	0	1	0	5
8	Thailand	6	0	0	1	5

=== Europe ===
==== Group A ====
Pos	Team	Pld	W	PSW	PSL	L	GF	GA	GD	Pts	Qualification
1	Spain	3	2	0	1	0	32	27	+5	7	Quarterfinals
2	Croatia (H)	3	1	1	1	0	32	27	+5	6	Quarterfinals
3	Montenegro	3	0	2	0	1	33	35	−2	4	Playoffs
4	France	3	0	0	1	2	23	31	−8	1	Playoffs

Source: LEN
Rules for classification: 1) points; 2) head-to-head points; 3) head-to-head goal difference; 4) head-to-head number of goals scored; 5) Goal difference.
(H) Host

==== Group B ====
Pos	Team	Pld	W	PSW	PSL	L	GF	GA	GD	Pts	Qualification
1	Hungary	3	2	0	0	1	33	26	+7	6 (Note: Hungary 3 Pts, +3 GD; Italy 3 Pts, +2 GD; Greece 3 Pts, −5 GD)	Quarterfinals
2	Italy	3	2	0	0	1	42	23	+19	6	Quarterfinals
3	Greece	3	2	0	0	1	36	32	+4	6	Playoffs
4	Georgia	3	0	0	0	3	25	55	−30	0	Playoffs

Source: LEN
Rules for classification: 1) points; 2) head-to-head points; 3) head-to-head goal difference; 4) head-to-head number of goals scored; 5) Goal difference.

==== Group C ====
Pos	Team	Pld	W	PSW	PSL	L	GF	GA	GD	Pts	Qualification
1	Serbia	3	3	0	0	0	57	11	+46	9	Playoffs
2	Germany	3	2	0	0	1	38	35	+3	6	Playoffs
3	Malta	3	1	0	0	2	30	50	−20	3	Classification round
4	Israel	3	0	0	0	3	20	49	−29	0	Classification round

Source: LEN
Rules for classification: 1) points; 2) head-to-head points; 3) head-to-head goal difference; 4) head-to-head number of goals scored; 5) Goal difference.

==== Group D ====
Pos	Team	Pld	W	PSW	PSL	L	GF	GA	GD	Pts	Qualification
1	Romania	3	3	0	0	0	33	20	+13	9	Playoffs
2	Netherlands	3	2	0	0	1	48	25	+23	6	Playoffs
3	Slovakia	3	1	0	0	2	24	32	−8	3	Classification round
4	Slovenia	3	0	0	0	3	19	47	−28	0	Classification round

Source: LEN
Rules for classification: 1) points; 2) head-to-head points; 3) head-to-head goal difference; 4) head-to-head number of goals scored; 5) Goal difference.

==== Bracket ====
Play-offs
10 January
France	10
Serbia	14
11 January
Greece	15
Netherlands	10
11 January
Georgia	11
Romania	18
10 January
Montenegro	10
Germany	5

Quarter-finals
12 January
Hungary (PSO)	10 (5)
Serbia	10 (4)
12 January
Croatia	13
Greece	8
12 January
Spain	24
Romania	7
12 January
Italy	14
Montenegro	8

Semi-finals
14 January
Hungary	8
Croatia	11
14 January
Spain	7
Italy	4

Final
16 January
Croatia	10
Spain	11
Third place
16 January
Hungary	7
Italy	12

==== Final standing ====
Rank	Team
1st place, gold medalist(s)	Spain
2nd place, silver medalist(s)	Croatia
3rd place, bronze medalist(s)	Italy
4	Hungary
5	Greece
6	Montenegro
7	Serbia
8	Romania
9	France
10	Georgia
11	Netherlands
12	Germany
13	Slovakia
14	Slovenia
15	Malta
16	Israel

=== Americas ===
==== Pool A ====
Pos	Team	Pld	W	PSW	PSL	L	GF	GA	GD	Pts	Qualification
1	United States	3	3	0	0	0	82	18	+64	9	Quarterfinals
2	Brazil	3	2	0	0	1	46	39	+7	6	Quarterfinals
3	Puerto Rico	3	1	0	0	2	29	58	−29	3	Quarterfinals
4	Mexico	3	0	0	0	3	24	66	−42	0	Quarterfinals

Source: Santiago 2023
Rules for classification: 1) points; 2) head-to-head points; 3) head-to-head goal difference; 4) head-to-head number of goals scored; 5) goal difference.

==== Pool B ====
Pos	Team	Pld	W	PSW	PSL	L	GF	GA	GD	Pts	Qualification
1	Canada	3	3	0	0	0	71	18	+53	9	Quarterfinals
2	Argentina	3	2	0	0	1	43	21	+22	6	Quarterfinals
3	Cuba	3	1	0	0	2	24	58	−34	3	Quarterfinals
4	Chile (H)	3	0	0	0	3	16	57	−41	0	Quarterfinals

Source: Santiago 2023
Rules for classification: 1) points; 2) head-to-head points; 3) head-to-head goal difference; 4) head-to-head number of goals scored; 5) goal difference.
(H) Host

==== Bracket ====
Quarterfinals
2 November
Brazil	16
Cuba	6
2 November
Mexico	5
Canada	20
2 November
Puerto Rico	9
Argentina	20
2 November
United States	28
Chile	2

Semifinals
3 November
Brazil	13
Canada	12
3 November
Argentina	7
United States	22

Gold medal match
4 November
Brazil	7
United States	17
Bronze medal match
4 November
Canada	10
Argentina	12

5–8th place semifinals
3 November
Cuba	11
Mexico	16
3 November
Puerto Rico	16
Chile	6

Fifth place
4 November
Mexico	9
Puerto Rico	13
Seventh place
4 November
Cuba (PSO)	7 (5)
Chile	7 (4)

==== Final standing ====
Rank	Team
1st place, gold medalist(s)	United States
2nd place, silver medalist(s)	Brazil
3rd place, bronze medalist(s)	Argentina
4	Canada
5	Puerto Rico
6	Mexico
7	Cuba
8	Chile

== 2024 World Championships ==
The top four teams, the top African team and the top Oceanian team of the men's water polo tournament at the 2024 World Aquatics Championships in Doha, Qatar obtained a ticket for Paris 2024.

=== Group A ===
Pos	Team	Pld	W	PSW	PSL	L	GF	GA	GD	Pts	Qualification
1	Spain	3	3	0	0	0	46	20	+26	9	Quarterfinals
2	Croatia	3	2	0	0	1	48	24	+24	6	Playoffs
3	Australia	3	1	0	0	2	46	35	+11	3	Playoffs
4	South Africa	3	0	0	0	3	18	79	−61	0	13–16th place semifinals

Source: World Aquatics
Rules for classification: 1) points; 2) head-to-head points; 3) head-to-head goal difference; 4) head-to-head number of goals scored; 5) Goal difference.

=== Group B ===
Pos	Team	Pld	W	PSW	PSL	L	GF	GA	GD	Pts	Qualification
1	Greece	3	3	0	0	0	60	22	+38	9	Quarterfinals
2	France	3	2	0	0	1	44	33	+11	6	Playoffs
3	China	3	1	0	0	2	25	48	−23	3	Playoffs
4	Brazil	3	0	0	0	3	23	49	−26	0	13–16th place semifinals

Source: World Aquatics
Rules for classification: 1) points; 2) head-to-head points; 3) head-to-head goal difference; 4) head-to-head number of goals scored; 5) Goal difference.

=== Group C ===
Pos	Team	Pld	W	PSW	PSL	L	GF	GA	GD	Pts	Qualification
1	Serbia	3	3	0	0	0	45	28	+17	9	Quarterfinals
2	Montenegro	3	1	1	0	1	30	36	−6	5	Playoffs
3	United States	3	1	0	1	1	41	30	+11	4	Playoffs
4	Japan	3	0	0	0	3	26	48	−22	0	13–16th place semifinals

Source: World Aquatics
Rules for classification: 1) points; 2) head-to-head points; 3) head-to-head goal difference; 4) head-to-head number of goals scored; 5) Goal difference.

=== Group D ===
Pos	Team	Pld	W	PSW	PSL	L	GF	GA	GD	Pts	Qualification
1	Hungary	3	2	1	0	0	52	18	+34	8	Quarterfinals
2	Italy	3	2	0	1	0	58	22	+36	7	Playoffs
3	Romania	3	1	0	0	2	43	34	+9	3	Playoffs
4	Kazakhstan	3	0	0	0	3	7	86	−79	0	13–16th place semifinals

Source: World Aquatics
Rules for classification: 1) points; 2) head-to-head points; 3) head-to-head goal difference; 4) head-to-head number of goals scored; 5) Goal difference.

=== Bracket ===
Playoffs
11 February
Montenegro	12
Romania	9
11 February
United States	12
Italy	13
11 February
Croatia	22
China	4
11 February
Australia	8
France	11

Quarter-finals
13 February
Spain	15
Montenegro	12
13 February
Greece	10
Italy	11
13 February
Serbia	13
Croatia	15
13 February
Hungary	10
France	11

Semi-finals
15 February
Spain	6
Italy	8
15 February
Croatia	11 (6)
France	11 (5)

Final
17 February
Italy	11 (2)
Croatia (PSO)	11 (4)
Third place
17 February
Spain	14
France	10

5th place bracket

5th–8th place semifinals
15 February
Montenegro	10 (3)
Greece (PSO)	10 (4)
15 February
Serbia	11
Hungary	10

Fifth place game
17 February
Greece	15
Serbia	11
Seventh place game
17 February
Montenegro	14 (2)
Hungary (PSO)	14 (4)

9th place bracket

9th–12th place semifinals
13 February
China	7
Romania	9
13 February
Australia	10
United States	16

Ninth place game
15 February
Romania	9
United States	13
Eleventh place game
15 February
China	7
Australia	17

13th place bracket

13th–16th place semifinals
11 February
South Africa	5
Brazil	18
11 February
Japan	17
Kazakhstan	4

13th place game
13 February
Brazil	11
Japan	22
15th place game
13 February
South Africa	11
Kazakhstan	10

=== Final standing ===
Rank	Team
1st place, gold medalist(s)	Croatia
2nd place, silver medalist(s)	Italy
3rd place, bronze medalist(s)	Spain
4	France
5	Greece
6	Serbia
7	Hungary
8	Montenegro
9	United States
10	Romania
11	Australia
12	China
13	Japan
14	Brazil
15	South Africa
16	Kazakhstan
