= Pan American Aquatics U17 Water Polo Championships =

International youth water polo competition

- Current season, competition or edition: 2025 Pan American U17 Water Polo Championship – Men's tournament 2025 Pan American U17 Water Polo Championship – Women's tournament
- Sport: Water polo
- Organizing body: PanAm Aquatics
- Continent: Americas
- Most recent champions: Men: Canada (1st title); Women: United States (5th title)
- Most titles: Men: Brazil; United States (3 titles each); Women: United States (5 titles)
- Qualification: World Aquatics U18 Water Polo Championships
- Related competitions: Pan American Aquatics U15 Water Polo Championships; Pan American Aquatics U19 Water Polo Championships

The Pan American Aquatics U17 Water Polo Championships are international water polo tournaments for under-17 boys' and girls' national water polo teams from North and South America, organized by PanAm Aquatics (UANA or ASUA). They also serve as continental qualifiers for the U18 World Championships.

== Men's competition ==
=== Medalists ===
Year	Host	Champion	Runner-up	Third place	Ref
2011	San Juan, Puerto Rico	Brazil	United States	Colombia	
2013	Buenos Aires, Argentina	Brazil	United States	Canada	
2015	Kingston, Jamaica	Brazil	United States	Canada	
2017	Lima, Peru	United States	Brazil	Canada	
2019	Couva, Trinidad and Tobago	United States	Brazil	Argentina	
2023	Bauru, Brazil	United States	Brazil	Argentina	
2025	Medellín, Colombia	Canada	Brazil	United States	

=== Medal table ===
Rank	Nation	Gold	Silver	Bronze	Total
1	Brazil	3	4	0	7
2	United States	3	3	1	7
3	Canada	1	0	3	4
4	Argentina	0	0	2	2
5	Colombia	0	0	1	1
Totals (5 entries)		7	7	7	21

== Women's competition ==
=== Medalists ===
Year	Host	Champion	Runner-up	Third place	Ref
2011	San Juan, Puerto Rico	Canada	United States	Brazil	
2013	Buenos Aires, Argentina	United States	Canada	Brazil	
2015	Kingston, Jamaica	United States	Canada	Mexico	
2017	Lima, Peru	Brazil	United States	Canada	
2019	Couva, Trinidad and Tobago	United States	Canada	Argentina	
2023	Bauru, Brazil	United States	Brazil	Canada	
2025	Medellín, Colombia	United States	Canada	Brazil	

=== Medal table ===
Rank	Nation	Gold	Silver	Bronze	Total
1	United States	5	2	0	7
2	Canada	1	4	2	7
3	Brazil	1	1	3	5
4	Argentina	0	0	1	1
4	Mexico	0	0	1	1
Totals (5 entries)		7	7	7	21

== See also ==
- Pan American Aquatics U15 Water Polo Championships
