= 2023 Pan American U17 Water Polo Championship – Women's tournament =

Tournament details
- Host country: Brazil
- City: Bauru
- Venue: 1 (in 1 host city)
- Dates: 2–8 April
- Teams: 7 (from 1 confederation)

Final positions
- Champions: United States (4th title)
- Runners-up: Brazil
- Third place: Argentina
- Fourth place: Canada

Tournament statistics
- Matches played: 27

Official website
- bauru2025

The 2023 Pan American U17 Water Polo Championship – Women's tournament was the sixth edition of the Pan American under-17 women's water polo championship. The event was held, along with the boys' tournament and men's and women's open tournaments, in Bauru, Brazil, from 2 to 8 April 2023.

Players born in 2006 or later were eligible to participate.

== Tournament format ==
Seven teams entered the championship. In the first round, all teams played round-robin in a single group. The top four teams advanced to the semifinals; the bottom three teams were dropped to the 5th–7th place playoffs.

All times are local (Brasília Time; UTC−3).

== First round ==
Pos	Team	Pld	W	PSW	PSL	L	GF	GA	GD	Pts	Qualification
1	United States	6	6	0	0	0	127	12	115	18	Semifinals
2	Brazil (H)	6	5	0	0	1	96	43	53	15	Semifinals
3	Canada	6	4	0	0	2	82	55	27	12	Semifinals
4	Argentina	6	3	0	0	3	49	80	−31	9	Semifinals
5	Mexico	6	2	0	0	4	40	74	−34	6	5th–7th place playoffs
6	Colombia	6	1	0	0	5	47	91	−44	3	5th–7th place playoffs
7	Chile	6	0	0	0	6	19	105	−86	0	5th–7th place playoffs

Source: bauru2023.panamaquaticsevents.com
(H) Hosts

2 April 2023; 9:05	Report	Mexico	10–4	Chile	ABDA Arena (indoor pool), Bauru
2 April 2023; 9:05	Report	Score by quarters: 2–1, 2–1, 4–1, 2–1			ABDA Arena (indoor pool), Bauru

2 April 2023; 10:15	Report	United States	23–1	Argentina	ABDA Arena (indoor pool), Bauru
2 April 2023; 10:15	Report	Score by quarters: 5–0, 7–1, 9–0, 2–0			ABDA Arena (indoor pool), Bauru

2 April 2023; 11:38	Report	Canada	15–6	Colombia	ABDA Arena (indoor pool), Bauru
2 April 2023; 11:38	Report	Score by quarters: 5–1, 6–3, 4–1, 0–1			ABDA Arena (indoor pool), Bauru

2 April 2023; 17:15	Report	United States	23–0	Mexico	ABDA Arena (indoor pool), Bauru
2 April 2023; 17:15	Report	Score by quarters: 5–0, 6–0, 8–0, 4–0			ABDA Arena (indoor pool), Bauru

2 April 2023; 19:15	Report	Brazil	17–7	Argentina	ABDA Arena (indoor pool), Bauru
2 April 2023; 19:15	Report	Score by quarters: 5–1, 1–2, 7–4, 4–0			ABDA Arena (indoor pool), Bauru

2 April 2023; 21:05	Report	Canada	27–5	Chile	ABDA Arena (indoor pool), Bauru
2 April 2023; 21:05	Report	Score by quarters: 7–2, 9–0, 5–2, 6–1			ABDA Arena (indoor pool), Bauru

3 April 2023; 9:00	Report	Canada	4–20	United States	ABDA Arena (indoor pool), Bauru
3 April 2023; 9:00	Report	Score by quarters: 1–4, 1–6, 0–5, 2–5			ABDA Arena (indoor pool), Bauru

3 April 2023; 10:15	Report	Colombia	11–2	Chile	ABDA Arena (indoor pool), Bauru
3 April 2023; 10:15	Report	Score by quarters: 2–1, 4–0, 2–1, 3–0			ABDA Arena (indoor pool), Bauru

3 April 2023; 11:30	Report	Brazil	16–1	Mexico	ABDA Arena (indoor pool), Bauru
3 April 2023; 11:30	Report	Score by quarters: 2–0, 2–1, 6–0, 6–0			ABDA Arena (indoor pool), Bauru

4 April 2023; 9:00	Report	Colombia	4–23	United States	ABDA Arena (indoor pool), Bauru
4 April 2023; 9:00	Report	Score by quarters: 0–8, 0–7, 1–6, 3–2			ABDA Arena (indoor pool), Bauru

4 April 2023; 10:15	Report	Argentina	12–11	Mexico	ABDA Arena (indoor pool), Bauru
4 April 2023; 10:15	Report	Score by quarters: 4–1, 3–1, 3–3, 2–6			ABDA Arena (indoor pool), Bauru

4 April 2023; 11:30	Report	Brazil	13–10	Canada	ABDA Arena (indoor pool), Bauru
4 April 2023; 11:30	Report	Score by quarters: 3–3, 2–3, 5–1, 3–3			ABDA Arena (indoor pool), Bauru

5 April 2023; 9:00	Report	Argentina	7–16	Canada	ABDA Arena (indoor pool), Bauru
5 April 2023; 9:00	Report	Score by quarters: 1–4, 1–4, 4–3, 1–5			ABDA Arena (indoor pool), Bauru

5 April 2023; 10:15	Report	Chile	1–24	United States	ABDA Arena (indoor pool), Bauru
5 April 2023; 10:15	Report	Score by quarters: 0–6, 0–6, 1–7, 0–5			ABDA Arena (indoor pool), Bauru

5 April 2023; 11:30	Report	Colombia	8–24	Brazil	ABDA Arena (indoor pool), Bauru
5 April 2023; 11:30	Report	Score by quarters: 3–3, 1–5, 2–8, 2–8			ABDA Arena (indoor pool), Bauru

6 April 2023; 9:00	Report	Argentina	13–9	Colombia	ABDA Arena (indoor pool), Bauru
6 April 2023; 9:00	Report	Score by quarters: 2–2, 4–3, 3–3, 4–1			ABDA Arena (indoor pool), Bauru

6 April 2023; 10:15	Report	Chile	3–24	Brazil	ABDA Arena (indoor pool), Bauru
6 April 2023; 10:15	Report	Score by quarters: 0–5, 2–7, 0–7, 1–5			ABDA Arena (indoor pool), Bauru

6 April 2023; 11:30	Report	Mexico	4–10	Canada	ABDA Arena (indoor pool), Bauru
6 April 2023; 11:30	Report	Score by quarters: 1–5, 1–2, 0–1, 2–2			ABDA Arena (indoor pool), Bauru

6 April 2023; 18:00	Report	Argentina	9–4	Chile	ABDA Arena (indoor pool), Bauru
6 April 2023; 18:00	Report	Score by quarters: 3–0, 3–2, 1–1, 2–1			ABDA Arena (indoor pool), Bauru

6 April 2023; 19:15	Report	Colombia	9–14	Mexico	ABDA Arena (outdoor pool), Bauru
6 April 2023; 19:15	Report	Score by quarters: 2–3, 3–3, 0–3, 4–5			ABDA Arena (outdoor pool), Bauru

6 April 2023; 19:15	Report	Brazil	2–14	United States	ABDA Arena (indoor pool), Bauru
6 April 2023; 19:15	Report	Score by quarters: 0–4, 0–5, 0–2, 2–3			ABDA Arena (indoor pool), Bauru

== 5th–7th place playoffs ==
=== Bracket ===
5th–7th place semifinal			5th place match
6	Colombia	8
7	Chile	7	SF	Colombia	9 (2)
			5	Mexico	9 (3)

=== 5th–7th place semifinal ===
7 April 2023; 9:00	Report	Colombia	8–7	Chile	ABDA Arena (indoor pool), Bauru
7 April 2023; 9:00	Report	Score by quarters: 3–2, 2–1, 2–2, 1–2			ABDA Arena (indoor pool), Bauru

=== 5th place match ===
8 April 2023; 9:00	Report	Colombia	9–9; PSO: 2–3	Mexico	ABDA Arena (indoor pool), Bauru
8 April 2023; 9:00	Report	Score by quarters: 4–2, 2–2, 2–2, 1–3			ABDA Arena (indoor pool), Bauru

== Championship playoffs ==
=== Bracket ===
Semifinals
1	United States	26
4	Argentina	4
2	Brazil	11
3	Canada	10

Final
United States	14
Brazil	2
3rd place match
Argentina	7
Canada	18

=== Semifinals ===
7 April 2023; 10:30	Report	United States	26–4	Argentina	ABDA Arena (indoor pool), Bauru
7 April 2023; 10:30	Report	Score by quarters: 5–2, 6–0, 10–2, 5–0			ABDA Arena (indoor pool), Bauru

7 April 2023; 11:45	Report	Brazil	11–10	Canada	ABDA Arena (indoor pool), Bauru
7 April 2023; 11:45	Report	Score by quarters: 0–3, 5–3, 3–2, 3–2			ABDA Arena (indoor pool), Bauru

=== 3rd place match ===
8 April 2023; 10:30	Report	Argentina	7–18	Canada	ABDA Arena (indoor pool), Bauru
8 April 2023; 10:30	Report	Score by quarters: 4–3, 3–6, 0–5, 0–4			ABDA Arena (indoor pool), Bauru

=== Final ===
8 April 2023; 11:45	Report	United States	14–2	Brazil	ABDA Arena (indoor pool), Bauru
8 April 2023; 11:45	Report	Score by quarters: 4–1, 5–0, 0–1, 5–0			ABDA Arena (indoor pool), Bauru

== Final standings ==
Rank	Team
1st place, gold medalist(s)	United States
2nd place, silver medalist(s)	Brazil
3rd place, bronze medalist(s)	Canada
4	Argentina
5	Mexico
6	Colombia
7	Chile
