= Toi Suzuki =

Japanese water polo player

Personal information
- Nationality: Japan
- Born: 20 October 1999 (age 27) Yamagata, Japan

Sport
- Sport: Water polo
Medal record
Men's water polo
Representing Japan
Asian Games
Gold medal – first place	2022 Hangzhou	Team
Gold medal – first place	2026 Aichi–Nagoya	Team

Toi Suzuki (鈴木 透生, born 20 October 1999) is a Japanese water polo player. He competed in the 2020 Summer Olympics, the 2024 Summer Olympics, and won a gold medal with Japan at the 2022 Asian Games. Other competitions include in the 2016 FINA Men's Youth Water Polo World Championships, the 2019 Summer Universiade, and the 2022, 2023, and 2024 World Aquatics Championships.
