= Caleb Simpson =

American Internet personality

- Born: January 9, 1992 (age 34); North Carolina

TikTok information
- Page: calebwsimpson
- Followers: 8.6 million
- Last updated: 25 November 2024

Caleb Simpson (born c. 1992 in North Carolina) is an American internet personality. Filming from New York City, Simpson is known for asking strangers how much they pay for rent in the city, then requesting a tour of their home, which he posts on social media.

Simpson attended Methodist University, where he as a member of the Kappa Sigma fraternity. He graduated in 2015 with a Bachelor's degree in Business Administration.
