= Croatia men's national under-18 water polo team =

National sports team

- FINA code: CRO
- Confederation: LEN (Europe)
- Head coach: Hrvoje Koljanin
- Captain: Nikša Batoš
- Best result: Gold (2016, 2026)
- Last updated: 9 July 2026

Croatia men's national under 18 water polo team is a national U-18 water polo team that represents Croatia in men's international youth water polo competitions. It is governed by Croatian Water Polo Federation (HVS). They are two times World champions (2016, 2026).

== Results ==
Team won gold medal at the 2016 World Championship in Podgorica, Montenegro.

Team won second world title at the 2026 Championship in Rio Maior, Portugal. After the loss in the first round to Montenegro (12-16), team defeated Hungary (12-9) and Serbia (15-11) in the group stage, then Italy (12-11) in quarterfinals, Spain (18-17) in semi-finals and USA (21-20) in the finals. Captain and goalkeeper Nikša Batoš was named as the goalkeeper of the tournament, and coach Hrvoje Koljanin as the coach of the tournament. Nardo Skejić was named men of the match, with 5 goals. Croatian prime minister Andrej Plenković and president Zoran Milanović held reception for the team after the world title.

=== World Youth Championship ===
| Year | Round | Position |
|---|---|---|
| (Australia) 2012 | Semi-final | 4th |
| (Turkey) 2014 | Quarterfinal | 8th |
| (Montenegro) 2016 | Champions | 1st |
| (Hungary) 2018 | Quarterfinal | 6th |
| (Serbia) 2022 | Quarterfinal | 5th |
| (Argentina) 2024 | Quarterfinal | 8th |
| (Portugal) 2026 | Champions | 1st |

== Squads ==
- World Champions, 2026 (2nd title): Nikola Batoš (captain), Duje Burazin, Nikola Ferić, Toni Galušić, Petar Erenda, Filip Rogić, Mihael Mladineo, Matej Šorić, Dominik Beljan, Nardo Skejić, Nardo Dragaš, Marin Bajurin, Ivano Lončar, Toma Drobac and Deni Sappe. Coach: Hrvoje Koljanin.
