= United States men's national youth water polo team =

- FINA code: USA
- Association: USA Water Polo
- Confederation: UANA (Americas)

U18 World Championship
- Appearances: 7 (first in 2012)
- Best result: (2026)

U19 Pan American Championship
- Appearances: 2 (first in 2022)
- Best result: (2024)

U17 Pan American Championship
- Appearances: 6 (first in 2011)
- Best result: (2017, 2019, 2023)

Media
- Website: usawaterpolo.org
Medal record
Men's water polo
U18 World Championship
Silver medal – second place	2026 Rio Maior	Team
U19 Pan American Championship
Gold medal – first place	2024 San Salvador	Team
Silver medal – second place	2022 Indianapolis	Team
U17 Pan American Championship
Gold medal – first place	2017 Lima	Team
Gold medal – first place	2019 Couva	Team
Gold medal – first place	2023 Bauru	Team
Silver medal – second place	2011 San Juan	Team
Silver medal – second place	2013 Buenos Aires	Team
Silver medal – second place	2015 Kingston	Team

The United States men's national youth water polo team represents the United States in men's World Aquatics U18 Water Polo Championships. It is an international water polo tournament held every two years for the players under the age of 18. It was launched by FINA in 2012.

== Results ==
=== Major tournaments ===
==== Competitive record ====
Updated after the 2026 World Aquatics Men's U18 Water Polo Championships.

Tournament	Appearances	Finishes				
Tournament	Appearances	Champions	Runners-up	Third place	Fourth place	Total
U18 World Championship	7	0	1	0	0	1
U19 Pan American Championship	2	1	1	0	0	2
U17 Pan American Championship	6	3	3	0	0	6
Total	15	4	5	0	0	9

==== U18 World Championship ====
Year	Result	Pld	W	L	D
(Australia) 2012	8th place	7	3	4	0
(Turkey) 2014	11th place	7	3	4	0
(Montenegro) 2016	10th place	7	3	4	0
(Hungary) 2018	9th place	7	4	3	0
(Serbia) 2022	9th place	6	3	2	1
(Argentina) 2024	7th place	7	2	5	0
(Portugal) 2026	Silver medal	6	4	2	0
Total	0 Title	47	22	24	1

==== U19 Pan American Championship ====
Year	Result	Pld	W	L	D
(United States) 2022	Silver medal	5	4	1	0
(El Salvador) 2024	Gold medal	6	6	0	0
(Brazil) 2026	See United States men's national junior water polo team				
Total	1 Title				

==== U17 Pan American Championship ====
Year	Result	Pld	W	L	D
(Puerto Rico) 2011	Silver medal				
(Argentina) 2013	Silver medal				
(Jamaica) 2015	Silver medal				
(Peru) 2017	Gold medal				
(Trinidad and Tobago) 2019	Gold medal				
(Brazil) 2023	Gold medal	6	6	0	0
Total	3 Titles				
