= Chile men's national water polo team =

Men's national water polo team representing Chile

Chile
- FINA code: CHI
- Confederation: UANA (Americas)

Olympic Games
- Appearances: 1 (first in 1948)
- Best result: 17th place (1948)

The Chile men's national water polo team is the representative for Chile in international men's water polo.

== Results ==
=== Olympic Games ===
- 1948 — 17th place
