= Argentina men's national water polo team =

Men's national water polo team representing Argentina

Argentina
- FINA code: ARG
- Association: Confederación Argentina de Deportes Acuáticos
- Confederation: UANA (Americas)
- Head coach: Juan Pablo Giri
- Asst coach: Fernando Arregui
- Captain: Ramiro Veich

Olympic Games
- Appearances: 3 (first in 1928)
- Best result: 1/8 finals (1928)

World Championship
- Appearances: 2 (first in 2015)
- Best result: 13th (2023)

The Argentina men's national water polo team is Argentina's representative in international men's water polo.

The team won the gold medal at the 2018 South American Games.

== Results ==
=== Olympic Games ===
- 1928 — 1/8 finals
- 1948 — Second round
- 1952 — First round

=== World Championship ===
- 2015 — 16th place
- 2023 – 13th place

== Team ==
=== Current squad ===
Roster for the 2023 World Aquatics Championships.

Head coach: Juan Pablo Giri

- 1 Diego Malnero GK
- 2 Ramiro Veich FP
- 3 Tomás Galimberti FP
- 4 Tomás Tilatti FP
- 5 Nahuel Leona FP
- 6 Tomás Echenique FP
- 7 Guido Martino FP
- 8 Eduardo Bonomo FP
- 9 Carlos Camnasio FP
- 10 Esteban Corsi FP
- 11 Guido Poggi FP
- 12 Teo Soler FP
- 13 Octavio Salas GK

=== Notable players ===
- Gonzalo Echenique (?-2014) (later Spain)
