= Colombia men's national water polo team =

Colombia
- FINA code: COL
- Confederation: UANA (Americas)

World Championship
- Appearances: 1 (first in 1975)
- Best result: 16th place (1975)

The Colombia men's national water polo team is the representative for Colombia in international men's water polo.

The team won the silver medal at the 2010 South American Games and the gold medal at the 2018 Central American and Caribbean Games, defeating Cuba 12–10 in the final.

Colombia has also won gold at the Bolivarian Games on three occasions: 2013, 2017, and 2022.

== Results ==
=== World Championship ===
- 1975 – 16th place
