= 2026 World Aquatics Women's U18 Water Polo Championships =

Water polo tournament held in Puerto de la Cruz, Spain

Tournament details
- Host country: Spain
- City: Puerto de la Cruz
- Venue: 1 (in 1 host city)
- Dates: 16–23 August 2026
- Teams: 20 (from 5 confederations)

Final positions
- Champions: Australia (1st title)
- Runners-up: Spain
- Third place: United States
- Fourth place: Hungary

Official website
- Puerto de la Cruz 2026

The 2026 World Aquatics Women's U18 Water Polo Championships was the seventh edition of the biannual tournament for under-18 women's national water polo teams across the world, organized by the world's governing aquatics body, World Aquatics. The tournament was played from 16 to 23 August 2026 in Puerto de la Cruz, Tenerife, Spain.

20 teams participated in the tournament. Australia secured their first ever title with a victory over Spain in the final, 9–5.

== Hosts selection ==
Puerto de la Cruz, Tenerife, Spain was given the hosting rights on 7 January 2026. This was the second time the country hosted the event, after 2014.

=== Quotes ===
"Thanks to the joint efforts of the Government of the Canary Islands, the Cabildo of Tenerife, and the Puerto de la Cruz City Council, the centre is positioned as a strategic hub for the promotion and development of aquatic sports both in Tenerife and across Spain. With the support of the Royal Spanish Swimming Federation, the CDAT is set to become a magnet for athletes, federations and international competitions, contributing to the growth of sport and reinforcing the Canary Islands as a premier sports destination."

— Fernando Carpena, president of the Royal Spanish Swimming Federation.

== Participating teams ==
Africa

- South Africa
- Zimbabwe

Americas

- Brazil
- Canada
- Colombia
- United States

Asia

- China

Europe

- Croatia
- Germany
- Greece
- Hungary
- Israel
- Italy
- Malta
- Netherlands
- Serbia
- Spain (Hosts)
- Turkey

Oceania

- Australia
- New Zealand

== Format ==
The 20 teams were divided in two divisions. The top eight teams made Division 1 and the other 12 Division 2. Division 1 was split into two groups of four teams, while Division 2 was split into four groups of three teams. The top two teams from each group of Division 1 advanced directly to the quarterfinals, while the bottom two teams from each group played against Division 2 group winners in the crossover round. Starting with quarterfinals onward, the regular knock-out system with consolation playoffs and final classification matches was used.

All times are local (Western European Summer Time; UTC+1).

== Group stage ==
=== Division 1 ===
==== Group A ====
Pos	Team	Pld	W	PSW	PSL	L	GF	GA	GD	Pts	Qualification
1	Greece	3	3	0	0	0	46	28	18	9	Quarterfinals
2	Hungary	3	2	0	0	1	35	35	0	6	Quarterfinals
3	Netherlands	3	1	0	0	2	32	36	−4	3	Crossover 2
4	Italy	3	0	0	0	3	34	48	−14	0	Crossover 2

Source: World Aquatics
Rules for classification: 1) points; 2) head-to-head points; 3) head-to-head goal difference; 4) head-to-head number of goals scored; 5) Goal difference.

16 August 2026; 15:00	Report	Netherlands	7–11	Greece
16 August 2026; 15:00	Report	Score by quarters: 2–1, 1–5, 1–2, 3–3

16 August 2026; 16:30	Report	Hungary	12–11	Italy
16 August 2026; 16:30	Report	Score by quarters: 4–2, 1–3, 3–3, 4–3

17 August 2026; 16:30	Report	Netherlands	10–13	Hungary
17 August 2026; 16:30	Report	Score by quarters: 2–4, 2–3, 3–2, 3–4

17 August 2026; 18:00	Report	Greece	21–11	Italy
17 August 2026; 18:00	Report	Score by quarters: 8–1, 3–2, 6–3, 4–5

18 August 2026; 15:00	Report	Hungary	10–14	Greece
18 August 2026; 15:00	Report	Score by quarters: 2–4, 1–5, 3–3, 4–2

18 August 2026; 16:30	Report	Netherlands	15–12	Italy
18 August 2026; 16:30	Report	Score by quarters: 3–1, 5–5, 5–3, 2–3

==== Group B ====
Pos	Team	Pld	W	PSW	PSL	L	GF	GA	GD	Pts	Qualification
1	Spain (H)	3	3	0	0	0	56	21	35	9	Quarterfinals
2	United States	3	2	0	0	1	43	24	19	6	Quarterfinals
3	China	3	1	0	0	2	22	42	−20	3	Crossover 2
4	Croatia	3	0	0	0	3	22	56	−34	0	Crossover 2

Source: World Aquatics
Rules for classification: 1) points; 2) head-to-head points; 3) head-to-head goal difference; 4) head-to-head number of goals scored; 5) Goal difference.
(H) Hosts

16 August 2026; 18:00	Report	China	2–14	United States
16 August 2026; 18:00	Report	Score by quarters: 1–2, 0–5, 0–4, 1–3

16 August 2026; 19:30	Report	Croatia	6–22	Spain
16 August 2026; 19:30	Report	Score by quarters: 0–9, 2–4, 3–4, 1–5

17 August 2026; 15:00	Report	Croatia	10–16	China
17 August 2026; 15:00	Report	Score by quarters: 2–4, 4–3, 2–3, 2–6

17 August 2026; 19:30	Report	Spain	16–11	United States
17 August 2026; 19:30	Report	Score by quarters: 5–3, 2–5, 6–2, 3–1

18 August 2026; 18:00	Report	Croatia	6–18	United States
18 August 2026; 18:00	Report	Score by quarters: 1–5, 3–3, 2–6, 0–4

18 August 2026; 19:30	Report	China	4–18	Spain
18 August 2026; 19:30	Report	Score by quarters: 3–5, 0–5, 0–3, 1–5

=== Division 2 ===
==== Group C ====
Pos	Team	Pld	W	PSW	PSL	L	GF	GA	GD	Pts	Qualification
1	New Zealand	2	2	0	0	0	37	28	9	6	Crossover 1
2	Turkey	2	1	0	0	1	35	31	4	3	13th–20th place classification
3	Colombia	2	0	0	0	2	26	39	−13	0	13th–20th place classification

Source: World Aquatics

16 August 2026; 9:00	Report	New Zealand	17–16	Turkey
16 August 2026; 9:00	Report	Score by quarters: 4–4, 5–2, 4–5, 4–5

17 August 2026; 13:30	Report	Colombia	14–19	Turkey
17 August 2026; 13:30	Report	Score by quarters: 4–3, 5–5, 2–5, 3–6

18 August 2026; 12:00	Report	New Zealand	20–12	Colombia
18 August 2026; 12:00	Report	Score by quarters: 4–3, 8–3, 4–3, 4–3

==== Group D ====
Pos	Team	Pld	W	PSW	PSL	L	GF	GA	GD	Pts	Qualification
1	Canada	2	2	0	0	0	27	14	13	6	Crossover 1
2	Germany	2	1	0	0	1	22	21	1	3	13th–20th place classification
3	Malta	2	0	0	0	2	14	28	−14	0	13th–20th place classification

Source: World Aquatics

16 August 2026; 10:30	Report	Malta	10–12	Germany
16 August 2026; 10:30	Report	Score by quarters: 2–3, 2–2, 2–4, 4–3

17 August 2026; 9:00	Report	Canada	11–10	Germany
17 August 2026; 9:00	Report	Score by quarters: 2–2, 3–3, 4–3, 2–2

18 August 2026; 13:40	Report	Malta	4–16	Canada
18 August 2026; 13:40	Report	Score by quarters: 2–4, 2–3, 0–3, 0–6

==== Group E ====
Pos	Team	Pld	W	PSW	PSL	L	GF	GA	GD	Pts	Qualification
1	Israel	2	2	0	0	0	38	16	22	6	Crossover 1
2	South Africa	2	1	0	0	1	24	25	−1	3	13th–20th place classification
3	Zimbabwe	2	0	0	0	2	11	32	−21	0	13th–20th place classification

Source: World Aquatics

16 August 2026; 12:00	Report	South Africa	13–6	Zimbabwe
16 August 2026; 12:00	Report	Score by quarters: 3–2, 3–0, 3–2, 4–2

17 August 2026; 10:30	Report	Israel	19–5	Zimbabwe
17 August 2026; 10:30	Report	Score by quarters: 3–1, 7–3, 4–0, 5–1

18 August 2026; 9:00	Report	South Africa	11–19	Israel
18 August 2026; 9:00	Report	Score by quarters: 0–5, 4–5, 2–5, 5–4

==== Group F ====
Pos	Team	Pld	W	PSW	PSL	L	GF	GA	GD	Pts	Qualification
1	Australia	2	2	0	0	0	57	12	45	6	Crossover 1
2	Serbia	2	1	0	0	1	17	33	−16	3	13th–20th place classification
3	Brazil	2	0	0	0	2	18	47	−29	0	13th–20th place classification

Source: World Aquatics

16 August 2026; 13:30	Report	Australia	35–7	Brazil
16 August 2026; 13:30	Report	Score by quarters: 8–1, 11–3, 8–3, 8–0

17 August 2026; 12:00	Report	Serbia	12–11	Brazil
17 August 2026; 12:00	Report	Score by quarters: 1–1, 7–6, 2–2, 2–2

18 August 2026; 10:30	Report	Australia	22–5	Serbia
18 August 2026; 10:30	Report	Score by quarters: 7–3, 5–1, 4–1, 6–0

== 13th–20th place classification ==
=== Group G ===
Pos	Team	Pld	W	PSW	PSL	L	GF	GA	GD	Pts	Qualification
1	Turkey	3	3	0	0	0	53	29	24	9	13th place match
2	Brazil	3	2	0	0	1	42	28	14	6	15th place match
3	South Africa	3	1	0	0	2	37	45	−8	3	17th place match
4	Malta	3	0	0	0	3	20	50	−30	0	19th place match

Source: World Aquatics
Rules for classification: 1) points; 2) head-to-head points; 3) head-to-head goal difference; 4) head-to-head number of goals scored; 5) Goal difference.

19 August 2026; 10:30	Report	Turkey	22–6	Malta
19 August 2026; 10:30	Report	Score by quarters: 8–0, 5–2, 5–3, 4–1

19 August 2026; 12:00	Report	South Africa	11–17	Brazil
19 August 2026; 12:00	Report	Score by quarters: 2–5, 4–3, 3–3, 2–6

20 August 2026; 9:00	Report	South Africa	13–17	Turkey
20 August 2026; 9:00	Report	Score by quarters: 3–6, 2–3, 3–6, 5–2

20 August 2026; 10:30	Report	Brazil	15–3	Malta
20 August 2026; 10:30	Report	Score by quarters: 4–0, 3–1, 4–0, 4–2

21 August 2026; 9:00	Report	Turkey	14–10	Brazil
21 August 2026; 9:00	Report	Score by quarters: 5–0, 3–3, 5–5, 1–2

21 August 2026; 10:30	Report	South Africa	13–11	Malta
21 August 2026; 10:30	Report	Score by quarters: 4–3, 4–3, 3–2, 2–3

=== Group H ===
Pos	Team	Pld	W	PSW	PSL	L	GF	GA	GD	Pts	Qualification
1	Germany	3	3	0	0	0	48	17	31	9	13th place match
2	Serbia	3	2	0	0	1	43	19	24	6	15th place match
3	Colombia	3	1	0	0	2	32	44	−12	3	17th place match
4	Zimbabwe	3	0	0	0	3	13	56	−43	0	19th place match

Source: World Aquatics
Rules for classification: 1) points; 2) head-to-head points; 3) head-to-head goal difference; 4) head-to-head number of goals scored; 5) Goal difference.

19 August 2026; 13:30	Report	Colombia	6–21	Germany
19 August 2026; 13:30	Report	Score by quarters: 1–4, 1–5, 2–6, 2–6

19 August 2026; 15:00	Report	Zimbabwe	1–21	Serbia
19 August 2026; 15:00	Report	Score by quarters: 0–7, 0–4, 1–5, 0–5

20 August 2026; 12:00	Report	Zimbabwe	8–17	Colombia
20 August 2026; 12:00	Report	Score by quarters: 2–2, 4–7, 1–2, 1–6

20 August 2026; 13:30	Report	Serbia	7–9	Germany
20 August 2026; 13:30	Report	Score by quarters: 1–1, 3–2, 0–4, 3–2

21 August 2026; 12:00	Report	Colombia	9–15	Serbia
21 August 2026; 12:00	Report	Score by quarters: 2–3, 1–4, 3–3, 3–5

21 August 2026; 13:30	Report	Zimbabwe	4–18	Germany
21 August 2026; 13:30	Report	Score by quarters: 1–5, 0–3, 0–3, 3–7

=== 19th place match ===
22 August 2026; 9:00	Report	Malta	18–9	Zimbabwe
22 August 2026; 9:00	Report	Score by quarters: 3–0, 4–5, 3–2, 8–2

=== 17th place match ===
22 August 2026; 10:30	Report	South Africa	11–12	Colombia
22 August 2026; 10:30	Report	Score by quarters: 3–4, 4–3, 1–3, 3–2

=== 15th place match ===
23 August 2026; 9:00	Report	Brazil	17–16	Serbia
23 August 2026; 9:00	Report	Score by quarters: 4–5, 4–3, 4–7, 5–1

=== 13th place match ===
23 August 2026; 10:30	Report	Turkey	12–12; PSO: 1–3	Germany
23 August 2026; 10:30	Report	Score by quarters: 3–4, 2–3, 4–3, 3–2

== Knockout stage ==
=== Crossover 1 ===
In Crossover 1, the four advancing teams from Division 2 each played a seeding match. Continuing in Crossover 2, the winners of these ties played against fourth-placed teams from Division 1, while the losers played against third-placed teams from Division 1.

19 August 2026; 16:30	Report	Canada	10–9	New Zealand
19 August 2026; 16:30	Report	Score by quarters: 2–2, 1–0, 3–5, 4–2

19 August 2026; 18:00	Report	Israel	6–15	Australia
19 August 2026; 18:00	Report	Score by quarters: 0–3, 2–1, 3–8, 1–3

=== Brackets ===
==== Main bracket ====
Crossover 2
20 August
Australia	28
Croatia	4
20 August
New Zealand	2
Netherlands	13
20 August
Canada	10
Italy	6
20 August
Israel	12
China	14

Quarterfinals
21 August
Greece	5
Australia	9
21 August
United States	11
Netherlands	8
21 August
Spain	24
Canada	8
21 August
Hungary	17
China	9

Semifinals
22 August
Australia	14
United States	10
22 August
Spain	13
Hungary	10

Final
23 August
Australia	9
Spain	5
3rd place match
23 August
Hungary	8
United States	7

==== 5th place bracket ====
5th–8th place semifinals
22 August
Greece	22
Netherlands	9
22 August
Canada	10
China	9

5th place match
23 August
Greece	19
Canada	9
7th place match
23 August
Netherlands	16
China	6

==== 9th place bracket ====
9th–12th place semifinals
22 August
New Zealand	12
Croatia	14
22 August
Israel	7
Italy	22

9th place match
23 August
Croatia	12
Italy	24
11th place match
23 August
New Zealand	7
Israel	8

=== Crossover 2 ===
20 August 2026; 15:00	Report	New Zealand	2–13	Netherlands
20 August 2026; 15:00	Report	Score by quarters: 0–1, 0–4, 1–4, 1–4

20 August 2026; 16:30	Report	Israel	12–14	China
20 August 2026; 16:30	Report	Score by quarters: 4–4, 3–4, 2–3, 3–3

20 August 2026; 18:00	Report	Canada	10–6	Italy
20 August 2026; 18:00	Report	Score by quarters: 2–0, 1–2, 5–2, 2–2

20 August 2026; 19:30	Report	Australia	28–4	Croatia
20 August 2026; 19:30	Report	Score by quarters: 5–0, 7–1, 9–1, 7–2

=== 9th–12th place semifinals ===
22 August 2026; 12:00	Report	New Zealand	12–14	Croatia
22 August 2026; 12:00	Report	Score by quarters: 2–4, 1–1, 6–3, 3–6

22 August 2026; 13:30	Report	Israel	7–22	Italy
22 August 2026; 13:30	Report	Score by quarters: 2–6, 2–5, 2–7, 1–4

==== 11th place match ====
23 August 2026; 12:00	Report	New Zealand	7–8	Israel
23 August 2026; 12:00	Report	Score by quarters: 3–1, 1–2, 0–3, 3–2

==== 9th place match ====
23 August 2026; 13:30	Report	Croatia	12–24	Italy
23 August 2026; 13:30	Report	Score by quarters: 3–8, 4–6, 2–6, 3–4

=== Quarterfinals ===
21 August 2026; 15:00	Report	Greece	5–9	Australia
21 August 2026; 15:00	Report	Score by quarters: 1–1, 2–4, 0–3, 2–1

21 August 2026; 16:30	Report	Hungary	17–9	China
21 August 2026; 16:30	Report	Score by quarters: 4–3, 5–1, 4–2, 4–3

21 August 2026; 18:00	Report	United States	11–8	Netherlands
21 August 2026; 18:00	Report	Score by quarters: 3–2, 3–1, 4–1, 1–4

21 August 2026; 19:30	Report	Spain	24–8	Canada
21 August 2026; 19:30	Report	Score by quarters: 6–1, 5–2, 8–2, 5–3

=== 5th–8th place semifinals ===
22 August 2026; 15:00	Report	Greece	22–9	Netherlands
22 August 2026; 15:00	Report	Score by quarters: 5–4, 5–2, 8–2, 4–1

22 August 2026; 16:30	Report	Canada	10–9	China
22 August 2026; 16:30	Report	Score by quarters: 0–3, 3–3, 3–1, 4–2

==== 7th place match ====
23 August 2026; 15:00	Report	Netherlands	16–6	China
23 August 2026; 15:00	Report	Score by quarters: 6–1, 0–2, 6–1, 4–2

==== 5th place match ====
23 August 2026; 16:30	Report	Greece	19–9	Canada
23 August 2026; 16:30	Report	Score by quarters: 7–1, 5–2, 3–2, 4–3

=== Semifinals ===
22 August 2026; 18:00	Report	Australia	14–10	United States
22 August 2026; 18:00	Report	Score by quarters: 2–1, 3–4, 3–3, 6–2

22 August 2026; 19:30	Report	Spain	13–10	Hungary
22 August 2026; 19:30	Report	Score by quarters: 3–1, 3–1, 3–4, 4–4

==== 3rd place match ====
23 August 2026; 18:00	Report	United States	8–7	Hungary
23 August 2026; 18:00	Report	Score by quarters: 2–3, 3–2, 0–1, 3–1

==== Final ====
23 August 2026; 19:30	Report	Australia	9–5	Spain
23 August 2026; 19:30	Report	Score by quarters: 3–0, 1–2, 3–2, 2–1

== Final standings ==
Rank	Team
1st place, gold medalist(s)	Australia
2nd place, silver medalist(s)	Spain
3rd place, bronze medalist(s)	United States
4	Hungary
5	Greece
6	Canada
7	Netherlands
8	China
9	Italy
10	Croatia
11	Israel
12	New Zealand
13	Germany
14	Turkey
15	Brazil
16	Serbia
17	Colombia
18	South Africa
19	Malta
20	Zimbabwe
