= United States women's national youth water polo team =

- FINA code: USA
- Association: USA Water Polo
- Confederation: UANA (Americas)

U18 World Championship
- Appearances: 7 (first in 2012)
- Best result: (2014, 2022)

U19 Pan American Championship
- Appearances: 1 (first in 2022)
- Best result: (2022)

U17 Pan American Championship
- Appearances: 6 (first in 2011)
- Best result: (2013, 2015, 2019, 2023)

Media
- Website: usawaterpolo.org
Medal record
Women's water polo
U18 World Championship
Gold medal – first place	2014 Madrid	Team
Gold medal – first place	2022 Belgrade	Team
Bronze medal – third place	2026 Tenerife	Team
U19 Pan American Championship
Gold medal – first place	2022 Indianapolis	Team
U17 Pan American Championship
Gold medal – first place	2013 Buenos Aires	Team
Gold medal – first place	2015 Kingston	Team
Gold medal – first place	2019 Couva	Team
Gold medal – first place	2023 Bauru	Team
Silver medal – second place	2011 San Juan	Team
Silver medal – second place	2017 Lima	Team
- Last updated: September 22, 2024

The United States women's national youth water polo team represents the United States in women's World Aquatics U18 Water Polo Championships. It is an international water polo tournament held every two years for the players under the age of 18. It was launched by FINA in 2012.

== Results ==
=== Major tournaments ===
==== Competitive record ====
Updated after the 2026 World Aquatics Women's U18 Water Polo Championships.

Tournament	Appearances	Finishes				
Tournament	Appearances	Champions	Runners-up	Third place	Fourth place	Total
U18 World Championship	7	2	0	1	2	5
U19 Pan American Championship	1	1	0	0	0	1
U17 Pan American Championship	6	4	2	0	0	6
Total	14	7	2	1	2	12

==== U18 World Championship ====
Year	Result	Pld	W	L	D
(Australia) 2012	4th place	6	3	3	0
(Spain) 2014	Gold medal	6	6	0	0
(New Zealand) 2016	5th place	7	5	1	1
(Serbia) 2018	7th place	6	4	2	0
(Greece) 2020	Cancelled				
(Serbia) 2022	Gold medal	7	6	1	0
(China) 2024	4th place	6	4	2	0
(Spain) 2026	Bronze medal	6	4	2	0
Total	2 Titles	44	32	11	1

==== U19 Pan American Championship ====
Year	Result	Pld	W	L	D
(United States) 2022	Gold medal	5	5	0	0
(El Salvador) 2024	See United States women's national cadet water polo team				
(Brazil) 2026	See United States women's national junior water polo team				
Total	1 Title				

==== U17 Pan American Championship ====
Year	Result	Pld	W	L	D
(Puerto Rico) 2011	Silver medal				
(Argentina) 2013	Gold medal				
(Jamaica) 2015	Gold medal				
(Peru) 2017	Silver medal				
(Trinidad and Tobago) 2019	Gold medal				
(Brazil) 2023	Gold medal	8	8	0	0
Total	4 Titles				
