= 2022 FINA World Women's Youth Water Polo Championships =

Youth women's water polo tournament

Tournament details
- Host country: Serbia
- City: Belgrade
- Venue: 1 (in 1 host city)
- Dates: 1–8 August 2022
- Teams: 16 (from 5 confederations)

Final positions
- Champions: United States (2nd title)
- Runners-up: Greece
- Third place: Hungary
- Fourth place: Italy

The 2022 FINA World Women's Youth Water Polo Championships was the 5th edition of the U18 women's water polo world championship. The tournament was played in Belgrade, Serbia, from 1 to 8 August 2022.

== Format ==
The 16 participating teams were drawn into four groups of four, which were played in a round-robin format. The group winners advanced automatically to the quarterfinals; the second- and the third-placed teams advanced to the qualification for quarterfinals; the fourth-placed teams advanced to the 13th–16th place classification.

== Group stage ==
All times are local (Central European Summer Time; UTC+2).

=== Group A ===
Pos	Team	Pld	W	D	L	GF	GA	GD	Pts	Qualification
1	Hungary	3	3	0	0	59	11	+48	6	Quarterfinals
2	Italy	3	2	0	1	59	17	+42	4	Playoffs
3	Kazakhstan	3	1	0	2	18	34	−16	2	Playoffs
4	Turkey	3	0	0	3	7	81	−74	0	13th–16th place classification

Source: World Aquatics

1 August 2022; 9:00	Report	Kazakhstan	3–16	Italy	Sportski centar Milan Gale Muškatirović, Belgrade
1 August 2022; 9:00	Report	Score by quarters: 1–3, 1–3, 1–4, 0–6			Sportski centar Milan Gale Muškatirović, Belgrade

1 August 2022; 10:30	Report	Turkey	2–32	Hungary	Sportski centar Milan Gale Muškatirović, Belgrade
1 August 2022; 10:30	Report	Score by quarters: 0–7, 0–8, 2–10, 0–7			Sportski centar Milan Gale Muškatirović, Belgrade

2 August 2022; 17:30	Report	Hungary	15–1	Kazakhstan	Sportski centar Milan Gale Muškatirović, Belgrade
2 August 2022; 17:30	Report	Score by quarters: 3–0, 5–0, 2–0, 5–1			Sportski centar Milan Gale Muškatirović, Belgrade

2 August 2022; 19:00	Report	Italy	35–2	Turkey	Sportski centar Milan Gale Muškatirović, Belgrade
2 August 2022; 19:00	Report	Score by quarters: 10–1, 8–0, 7–1, 10–0			Sportski centar Milan Gale Muškatirović, Belgrade

3 August 2022; 13:30	Report	Italy	8–12	Hungary	Sportski centar Milan Gale Muškatirović, Belgrade
3 August 2022; 13:30	Report	Score by quarters: 1–3, 2–3, 3–3, 2–3			Sportski centar Milan Gale Muškatirović, Belgrade

3 August 2022; 16:00	Report	Turkey	3–14	Kazakhstan	Sportski centar Milan Gale Muškatirović, Belgrade
3 August 2022; 16:00	Report	Score by quarters: 1–3, 1–3, 0–5, 1–3			Sportski centar Milan Gale Muškatirović, Belgrade

=== Group B ===
Pos	Team	Pld	W	D	L	GF	GA	GD	Pts	Qualification
1	Greece	3	3	0	0	52	30	+22	6	Quarterfinals
2	United States	3	2	0	1	63	24	+39	4	Playoffs
3	Uzbekistan	3	1	0	2	31	52	−21	2	Playoffs
4	Japan	3	0	0	3	24	64	−40	0	13th–16th place classification

Source: World Aquatics

1 August 2022; 12:00	Report	Japan	11–22	Greece	Sportski centar Milan Gale Muškatirović, Belgrade
1 August 2022; 12:00	Report	Score by quarters: 3–6, 0–7, 4–3, 4–6			Sportski centar Milan Gale Muškatirović, Belgrade

1 August 2022; 18:30	Report	Uzbekistan	7–26	United States	Sportski centar Milan Gale Muškatirović, Belgrade
1 August 2022; 18:30	Report	Score by quarters: 2–5, 2–6, 2–7, 1–8			Sportski centar Milan Gale Muškatirović, Belgrade

2 August 2022; 9:00	Report	United States	23–2	Japan	Sportski centar Milan Gale Muškatirović, Belgrade
2 August 2022; 9:00	Report	Score by quarters: 9–1, 3–0, 7–0, 4–1			Sportski centar Milan Gale Muškatirović, Belgrade

2 August 2022; 10:30	Report	Greece	15–5	Uzbekistan	Sportski centar Milan Gale Muškatirović, Belgrade
2 August 2022; 10:30	Report	Score by quarters: 4–0, 3–3, 4–2, 4–0			Sportski centar Milan Gale Muškatirović, Belgrade

3 August 2022; 17:30	Report	Greece	15–14	United States	Sportski centar Milan Gale Muškatirović, Belgrade
3 August 2022; 17:30	Report	Score by quarters: 2–4, 4–3, 6–2, 3–5			Sportski centar Milan Gale Muškatirović, Belgrade

3 August 2022; 19:00	Report	Uzbekistan	19–11	Japan	Sportski centar Milan Gale Muškatirović, Belgrade
3 August 2022; 19:00	Report	Score by quarters: 5–2, 5–2, 4–3, 5–4			Sportski centar Milan Gale Muškatirović, Belgrade

=== Group C ===
Pos	Team	Pld	W	D	L	GF	GA	GD	Pts	Qualification
1	Netherlands	3	3	0	0	54	18	+36	6	Quarterfinals
2	Australia	3	1	1	1	28	27	+1	3	Playoffs
3	Canada	3	1	1	1	35	37	−2	3	Playoffs
4	South Africa	3	0	0	3	18	53	−35	0	13th–16th place classification

Source: World Aquatics

1 August 2022; 13:30	Report	South Africa	6–26	Netherlands	Sportski centar Milan Gale Muškatirović, Belgrade
1 August 2022; 13:30	Report	Score by quarters: 2–7, 0–5, 1–4, 3–9			Sportski centar Milan Gale Muškatirović, Belgrade

1 August 2022; 15:30	Report	Canada	12–12	Australia	Sportski centar Milan Gale Muškatirović, Belgrade
1 August 2022; 15:30	Report	Score by quarters: 3–4, 3–1, 3–4, 3–3			Sportski centar Milan Gale Muškatirović, Belgrade

2 August 2022; 12:00	Report	Netherlands	18–8	Canada	Sportski centar Milan Gale Muškatirović, Belgrade
2 August 2022; 12:00	Report	Score by quarters: 6–3, 3–1, 5–2, 4–2			Sportski centar Milan Gale Muškatirović, Belgrade

2 August 2022; 13:30	Report	Australia	12–5	South Africa	Sportski centar Milan Gale Muškatirović, Belgrade
2 August 2022; 13:30	Report	Score by quarters: 5–1, 2–1, 4–3, 1–1			Sportski centar Milan Gale Muškatirović, Belgrade

3 August 2022; 9:00	Report	Australia	4–10	Netherlands	Sportski centar Milan Gale Muškatirović, Belgrade
3 August 2022; 9:00	Report	Score by quarters: 2–5, 0–1, 1–3, 1–1			Sportski centar Milan Gale Muškatirović, Belgrade

3 August 2022; 10:30	Report	South Africa	7–15	Canada	Sportski centar Milan Gale Muškatirović, Belgrade
3 August 2022; 10:30	Report	Score by quarters: 3–2, 0–4, 1–7, 3–2			Sportski centar Milan Gale Muškatirović, Belgrade

=== Group D ===
Pos	Team	Pld	W	D	L	GF	GA	GD	Pts	Qualification
1	Spain	3	3	0	0	52	21	+31	6	Quarterfinals
2	New Zealand	3	2	0	1	41	34	+7	4	Playoffs
3	Croatia	3	1	0	2	33	37	−4	2	Playoffs
4	Serbia	3	0	0	3	19	53	−34	0	13th–16th place classification

Source: World Aquatics

1 August 2022; 17:00	Report	Croatia	3–17	Spain	Sportski centar Milan Gale Muškatirović, Belgrade
1 August 2022; 17:00	Report	Score by quarters: 0–5, 2–4, 0–2, 1–6			Sportski centar Milan Gale Muškatirović, Belgrade

1 August 2022; 20:30	Report	Serbia	5–17	New Zealand	Sportski centar Milan Gale Muškatirović, Belgrade
1 August 2022; 20:30	Report	Score by quarters: 2–5, 0–3, 1–3, 2–6			Sportski centar Milan Gale Muškatirović, Belgrade

2 August 2022; 16:00	Report	New Zealand	13–12	Croatia	Sportski centar Milan Gale Muškatirović, Belgrade
2 August 2022; 16:00	Report	Score by quarters: 4–2, 2–1, 5–5, 2–4			Sportski centar Milan Gale Muškatirović, Belgrade

2 August 2022; 20:30	Report	Spain	18–7	Serbia	Sportski centar Milan Gale Muškatirović, Belgrade
2 August 2022; 20:30	Report	Score by quarters: 3–1, 6–2, 6–2, 3–2			Sportski centar Milan Gale Muškatirović, Belgrade

3 August 2022; 12:00	Report	Spain	17–11	New Zealand	Sportski centar Milan Gale Muškatirović, Belgrade
3 August 2022; 12:00	Report	Score by quarters: 8–6, 3–1, 3–2, 3–2			Sportski centar Milan Gale Muškatirović, Belgrade

3 August 2022; 20:30	Report	Serbia	7–18	Croatia	Sportski centar Milan Gale Muškatirović, Belgrade
3 August 2022; 20:30	Report	Score by quarters: 1–5, 3–2, 1–5, 2–6			Sportski centar Milan Gale Muškatirović, Belgrade

== Knockout stage ==
=== Brackets ===
==== Main bracket ====
Playoffs
4 August
Australia	13
Croatia	12
4 August
Canada	7
New Zealand	8
4 August
Italy	19
Uzbekistan	9
4 August
Kazakhstan	3
United States	17

Quarterfinals
5 August
Hungary	13
Australia	10
5 August
Greece	23
New Zealand	9
5 August
Netherlands	14
Italy	15
5 August
Spain	9
United States	13

Semifinals
7 August
Hungary	9
Greece	10
7 August
Italy	9
United States	18

Final
8 August
Greece	8
United States	10
Third place game
8 August
Hungary	9
Italy	5

==== 5th place bracket ====
5th–8th place semifinals
7 August
Australia	12
New Zealand	5
7 August
Netherlands	8
Spain	9

Fifth place game
8 August
Australia	12
Spain	16
Seventh place game
8 August
New Zealand	8
Netherlands	18

==== 9th place bracket ====
9th–12th place semifinals
5 August
Uzbekistan	5
Croatia	22
5 August
Kazakhstan	7
Canada	14

Ninth place game
7 August
Croatia	15
Canada	13
Eleventh place game
7 August
Uzbekistan	7
Kazakhstan	12

==== 13th place bracket ====
13th–16th place semifinals
4 August
Turkey	9
Japan	24
4 August
South Africa	17
Serbia	18

Thirteenth place game
5 August
Japan	16
Serbia	19
Fifteenth place game
5 August
Turkey	9
South Africa	12

=== 13th–16th place semifinals ===
4 August 2022; 12:00	Report	Turkey	9–24	Japan	Sportski centar Milan Gale Muškatirović, Belgrade
4 August 2022; 12:00	Report	Score by quarters: 1–7, 5–3, 1–5, 2–9			Sportski centar Milan Gale Muškatirović, Belgrade

4 August 2022; 13:30	Report	South Africa	17–18 (PSO)	Serbia	Sportski centar Milan Gale Muškatirović, Belgrade
4 August 2022; 13:30	Report	Score by quarters: 1–2, 3–3, 2–2, 3–2 PSO: 8–9			Sportski centar Milan Gale Muškatirović, Belgrade

==== Fifteenth place game ====
5 August 2022; 9:00	Report	Turkey	9–12	South Africa	Sportski centar Milan Gale Muškatirović, Belgrade
5 August 2022; 9:00	Report	Score by quarters: 4–1, 2–3, 2–6, 1–2			Sportski centar Milan Gale Muškatirović, Belgrade

==== Thirteenth place game ====
5 August 2022; 10:30	Report	Japan	16–19	Serbia	Sportski centar Milan Gale Muškatirović, Belgrade
5 August 2022; 10:30	Report	Score by quarters: 4–5, 4–2, 1–6, 7–6			Sportski centar Milan Gale Muškatirović, Belgrade

=== Playoffs ===
4 August 2022; 16:00	Report	Italy	19–9	Uzbekistan	Sportski centar Milan Gale Muškatirović, Belgrade
4 August 2022; 16:00	Report	Score by quarters: 4–0, 3–4, 6–1, 6–4			Sportski centar Milan Gale Muškatirović, Belgrade

4 August 2022; 17:30	Report	Kazakhstan	3–17	United States	Sportski centar Milan Gale Muškatirović, Belgrade
4 August 2022; 17:30	Report	Score by quarters: 0–6, 0–5, 1–5, 2–1			Sportski centar Milan Gale Muškatirović, Belgrade

4 August 2022; 19:00	Report	Australia	13–12	Croatia	Sportski centar Milan Gale Muškatirović, Belgrade
4 August 2022; 19:00	Report	Score by quarters: 8–3, 2–3, 2–3, 1–3			Sportski centar Milan Gale Muškatirović, Belgrade

4 August 2022; 20:30	Report	Canada	7–8	New Zealand	Sportski centar Milan Gale Muškatirović, Belgrade
4 August 2022; 20:30	Report	Score by quarters: 3–2, 3–2, 1–3, 0–1			Sportski centar Milan Gale Muškatirović, Belgrade

=== 9th–12th place semifinals ===
5 August 2022; 12:00	Report	Uzbekistan	5–22	Croatia	Sportski centar Milan Gale Muškatirović, Belgrade
5 August 2022; 12:00	Report	Score by quarters: 1–4, 0–5, 0–5, 4–8			Sportski centar Milan Gale Muškatirović, Belgrade

5 August 2022; 13:30	Report	Kazakhstan	7–14	Canada	Sportski centar Milan Gale Muškatirović, Belgrade
5 August 2022; 13:30	Report	Score by quarters: 0–3, 1–2, 3–5, 3–4			Sportski centar Milan Gale Muškatirović, Belgrade

==== Eleventh place game ====
7 August 2022; 12:00	Report	Uzbekistan	7–12	Kazakhstan	Sportski centar Milan Gale Muškatirović, Belgrade
7 August 2022; 12:00	Report	Score by quarters: 0–3, 4–4, 1–0, 2–5			Sportski centar Milan Gale Muškatirović, Belgrade

==== Ninth place game ====
7 August 2022; 13:30	Report	Croatia	15–13	Canada	Sportski centar Milan Gale Muškatirović, Belgrade
7 August 2022; 13:30	Report	Score by quarters: 2–4, 4–3, 5–3, 4–3			Sportski centar Milan Gale Muškatirović, Belgrade

=== Quarterfinals ===
5 August 2022; 16:00	Report	Hungary	13–10	Australia	Sportski centar Milan Gale Muškatirović, Belgrade
5 August 2022; 16:00	Report	Score by quarters: 5–3, 2–2, 4–4, 3–2			Sportski centar Milan Gale Muškatirović, Belgrade

5 August 2022; 17:30	Report	Greece	23–9	New Zealand	Sportski centar Milan Gale Muškatirović, Belgrade
5 August 2022; 17:30	Report	Score by quarters: 6–1, 5–1, 5–4, 7–3			Sportski centar Milan Gale Muškatirović, Belgrade

5 August 2022; 19:00	Report	Netherlands	14–15	Italy	Sportski centar Milan Gale Muškatirović, Belgrade
5 August 2022; 19:00	Report	Score by quarters: 1–3, 2–5, 5–3, 6–4			Sportski centar Milan Gale Muškatirović, Belgrade

5 August 2022; 20:30	Report	Spain	9–13	United States	Sportski centar Milan Gale Muškatirović, Belgrade
5 August 2022; 20:30	Report	Score by quarters: 0–3, 1–1, 2–5, 6–4			Sportski centar Milan Gale Muškatirović, Belgrade

=== 5th–8th place semifinals ===
7 August 2022; 16:00	Report	Australia	12–5	New Zealand	Sportski centar Milan Gale Muškatirović, Belgrade
7 August 2022; 16:00	Report	Score by quarters: 2–0, 3–2, 5–1, 2–2			Sportski centar Milan Gale Muškatirović, Belgrade

7 August 2022; 17:30	Report	Netherlands	8–9	Spain	Sportski centar Milan Gale Muškatirović, Belgrade
7 August 2022; 17:30	Report	Score by quarters: 2–3, 1–3, 2–2, 3–1			Sportski centar Milan Gale Muškatirović, Belgrade

==== Seventh place game ====
8 August 2022; 9:00	Report	New Zealand	8–18	Netherlands	Sportski centar Milan Gale Muškatirović, Belgrade
8 August 2022; 9:00	Report	Score by quarters: 3–6, 2–4, 1–6, 2–2			Sportski centar Milan Gale Muškatirović, Belgrade

==== Fifth place game ====
8 August 2022; 17:30	Report	Australia	12–16	Spain	Sportski centar Milan Gale Muškatirović, Belgrade
8 August 2022; 17:30	Report	Score by quarters: 1–5, 1–2, 7–4, 3–5			Sportski centar Milan Gale Muškatirović, Belgrade

=== Semifinals ===
7 August 2022; 19:00	Report	Hungary	9–10	Greece	Sportski centar Milan Gale Muškatirović, Belgrade
7 August 2022; 19:00	Report	Score by quarters: 3–4, 1–2, 1–4, 4–0			Sportski centar Milan Gale Muškatirović, Belgrade

7 August 2022; 20:30	Report	Italy	9–18	United States	Sportski centar Milan Gale Muškatirović, Belgrade
7 August 2022; 20:30	Report	Score by quarters: 3–7, 2–2, 2–6, 2–3			Sportski centar Milan Gale Muškatirović, Belgrade

==== Third place game ====
8 August 2022; 19:00	Report	Hungary	9–5	Italy	Sportski centar Milan Gale Muškatirović, Belgrade
8 August 2022; 19:00	Report	Score by quarters: 3–1, 3–1, 1–1, 2–2			Sportski centar Milan Gale Muškatirović, Belgrade

==== Final ====
8 August 2022; 20:30	Report	Greece	8–10	United States	Sportski centar Milan Gale Muškatirović, Belgrade
8 August 2022; 20:30	Report	Score by quarters: 2–5, 4–1, 1–2, 1–2			Sportski centar Milan Gale Muškatirović, Belgrade

== Final standings ==
Rank	Team
1st place, gold medalist(s)	United States
2nd place, silver medalist(s)	Greece
3rd place, bronze medalist(s)	Hungary
4	Italy
5	Spain
6	Australia
7	Netherlands
8	New Zealand
9	Croatia
10	Canada
11	Kazakhstan
12	Uzbekistan
13	Serbia
14	Japan
15	South Africa
16	Turkey
