= United States Aquatic Sports =

United States national federation for aquatic sports

- Sport: USA Swimming; USA Diving; United States Synchronized Swimming; USA Water Polo; U.S. Masters Swimming
- Jurisdiction: National
- Abbreviation: USAS
- Founded: 1980
- Affiliation: FINA
- President: Bill Smith
- Vice president(s): Jim Sheehan; Kathy Dacey
- Secretary: Laurette Longmire

Official website
- www.teamunify.com/Home.jsp?team=usas
- (United States)

United States Aquatic Sports (USAS) is the national federation for aquatic sports which represents the United States in FINA (Fédération Internationale de Natation). Since by U.S. law and FINA regulations, the United States must have only one national federation for itself to FINA, United States Aquatic Sports has served as the unifying body for the sports since 1980. Five separate national governing bodies (NGBs) make up USAS: USA Swimming, USA Diving, United States Synchronized Swimming, USA Water Polo, and U.S. Masters Swimming. Of the five, only U.S. Masters Swimming (USMS) is not a member of the United States Olympic Committee (USMS's main aim is adult swimming, exclusive of Olympic-swimming which is the domain of USA Swimming).

United States Aquatic Sports plays a very minor role in representation, and while USAS is the titular member federation, the NGBs play de facto roles in making decisions about participation in international competition and hosting. Ostensibly, USAS will "sign off" on the selections of an NGB's delegation to an international competition (whether hosted by the IOC, FINA, or ASUA).

USAS hosts an annual convention where the five NGBs meet, as well; currently this meeting also includes the annual conventions for all but water polo--who is in-season at the time, and instead holds its annual convention at another time of the year. The reasoning behind this is to allow the NGBs to save money on their national conventions and to allow collaboration between the NGBs on common issues of interest. USAS meetings are also held at the time.

== United States Aquatic Sports Convention locations ==
- 1979: Washington DC
- 1980: Snow Bird, UT
- 1981: Snow Bird, UT
- 1982: Memphis, TN
- 1983: Cincinnati, OH
- 1984: Indianapolis, IN
- 1985: Phoenix, AZ
- 1986: Fort Worth, TX
- 1987: Atlanta, GA
- 1988: St. Louis, MO
- 1989: Portland, OR
- 1990: Pittsburgh, PA
- 1991: Louisville, KY
- 1992: Minneapolis, MN
- 1993: Los Angeles, CA
- 1994: Kansas City, MO
- 1995: Houston, TX
- 1996: Orlando, FL
- 1997: San Diego, CA
- 1998: Cincinnati, OH
- 1999: San Diego, CA
- 2000: Kissimmee, FL
- 2001: Dearborn, MI
- 2002: Dallas/Fort Worth, TX
- 2003: San Diego, CA
- 2004: Orlando, FL
- 2005: Greensboro, NC
- 2006: Dearborn, MI
- 2007: Anaheim, CA
- 2008: Atlanta, GA
- 2009: Rosemont, IL
- 2010: Dallas, TX
- 2011: Jacksonville, FL
- 2012: Greensboro, NC
- 2013: Garden Grove, CA
- 2014: Jacksonville, FL
- 2015: Kansas City, KS
- 2016: Atlanta, GA
- 2017: Dallas, TX
- 2018: Jacksonville, FL
- 2019: Saint Louis, MO
- 2020: Jacksonville, FL
- 2021: Atlanta, GA

== See also ==
- United States women's national water polo team
- Swimming (sport) #Swimwear
