= 2024 World Aquatics Women's U18 Water Polo Championships =

Youth women's water polo tournament

Tournament details
- Host country: China
- City: Chengdu
- Venue: 1 (in 1 host city)
- Dates: 15–22 September 2024
- Teams: 16 (from 5 confederations)

Final positions
- Champions: Spain (2nd title)
- Runners-up: Greece
- Third place: Hungary
- Fourth place: United States

The 2024 World Aquatics Women's U18 Water Polo Championships was the 6th edition of the women's U18 Water Polo Championship. The tournament was played in Chengdu, China, from 15 to 22 September 2024. The United States were the defending champions. Spain became the world champions for the second time.

== Format ==
The 16 teams were divided into two divisions. The top eight teams made Division 1 and the other eight teams Division 2. Both divisions were split into two groups of four teams. The top two teams from each group of Division 1 advanced directly to the quarterfinals, while the other two teams from each group played against one of the top two sides from each group in Division 2 in the crossover round. Starting with quarterfinals onward, the regular knock-out system was used.

== Group stage ==
All times are local (China Standard Time – UTC+8).

=== Division 1 ===
==== Group A ====
Pos	Team	Pld	W	PSW	PSL	L	GF	GA	GD	Pts	Qualification
1	Spain	3	2	1	0	0	32	22	+10	8	Quarterfinals
2	Greece	3	2	0	1	0	31	17	+14	7	Quarterfinals
3	Italy	3	1	0	0	2	25	31	−6	3	Crossovers
4	Netherlands	3	0	0	0	3	19	37	−18	0	Crossovers

Source: World Aquatics

16 September 2024; 10:00	Report	Spain	12–10	Italy	Dongan Lake Sports Park, Chengdu
16 September 2024; 10:00	Report	Score by quarters: 4–1, 3–1, 3–2, 2–6			Dongan Lake Sports Park, Chengdu

16 September 2024; 11:30	Report	Greece	13–6	Netherlands	Dongan Lake Sports Park, Chengdu
16 September 2024; 11:30	Report	Score by quarters: 6–2, 4–1, 1–1, 2–2			Dongan Lake Sports Park, Chengdu

17 September 2024; 13:30	Report	Netherlands	8–11	Italy	Dongan Lake Sports Park, Chengdu
17 September 2024; 13:30	Report	Score by quarters: 1–1, 3–4, 1–2, 3–4			Dongan Lake Sports Park, Chengdu

17 September 2024; 16:00	Report	Greece	14–15 (PSO)	Spain	Dongan Lake Sports Park, Chengdu
17 September 2024; 16:00	Report	Score by quarters: 1–2, 2–0, 3–2, 1–3 PSO: 7–8			Dongan Lake Sports Park, Chengdu

18 September 2024; 13:30	Report	Italy	4–11	Greece	Dongan Lake Sports Park, Chengdu
18 September 2024; 13:30	Report	Score by quarters: 1–3, 1–3, 1–2, 1–3			Dongan Lake Sports Park, Chengdu

18 September 2024; 16:00	Report	Netherlands	5–13	Spain	Dongan Lake Sports Park, Chengdu
18 September 2024; 16:00	Report	Score by quarters: 3–3, 1–5, 1–2, 0–3			Dongan Lake Sports Park, Chengdu

==== Group B ====
Pos	Team	Pld	W	PSW	PSL	L	GF	GA	GD	Pts	Qualification
1	United States	3	2	1	0	0	37	27	+10	8	Quarterfinals
2	Hungary	3	2	0	1	0	44	21	+23	7	Quarterfinals
3	Australia	3	1	0	0	2	35	46	−11	3	Crossovers
4	New Zealand	3	0	0	0	3	22	44	−22	0	Crossovers

Updated to match(es) played on 18 September 2024. Source: World Aquatics

16 September 2024; 13:00	Report	New Zealand	12–15	Australia	Dongan Lake Sports Park, Chengdu
16 September 2024; 13:00	Report	Score by quarters: 4–4, 2–2, 3–5, 3–4			Dongan Lake Sports Park, Chengdu

16 September 2024; 14:30	Report	Hungary	12–13 (PSO)	United States	Dongan Lake Sports Park, Chengdu
16 September 2024; 14:30	Report	Score by quarters: 1–1, 5–4, 3–2, 0–2 PSO: 3–4			Dongan Lake Sports Park, Chengdu

17 September 2024; 17:30	Report	United States	16–12	Australia	Dongan Lake Sports Park, Chengdu
17 September 2024; 17:30	Report	Score by quarters: 4–2, 3–2, 7–4, 2–4			Dongan Lake Sports Park, Chengdu

17 September 2024; 20:30	Report	Hungary	17–4	New Zealand	Dongan Lake Sports Park, Chengdu
17 September 2024; 20:30	Report	Score by quarters: 4–0, 3–1, 5–1, 5–2			Dongan Lake Sports Park, Chengdu

18 September 2024; 17:30	Report	Australia	8–18	Hungary	Dongan Lake Sports Park, Chengdu
18 September 2024; 17:30	Report	Score by quarters: 4–5, 1–5, 1–5, 2–3			Dongan Lake Sports Park, Chengdu

18 September 2024; 20:30	Report	United States	12–6	New Zealand	Dongan Lake Sports Park, Chengdu
18 September 2024; 20:30	Report	Score by quarters: 4–1, 2–3, 3–1, 3–1			Dongan Lake Sports Park, Chengdu

=== Division 2 ===
==== Group C ====
Pos	Team	Pld	W	PSW	PSL	L	GF	GA	GD	Pts	Qualification
1	Croatia	3	3	0	0	0	64	23	+41	9	Crossovers
2	Canada	3	2	0	0	1	51	38	+13	6	Crossovers
3	Thailand	3	1	0	0	2	32	50	−18	3	13th–16th place classification
4	South Africa	3	0	0	0	3	22	58	−36	0	13th–16th place classification

Source: World Aquatics

15 September 2024; 9:30	Report	Thailand	11–21	Canada	Dongan Lake Sports Park, Chengdu
15 September 2024; 9:30	Report	Score by quarters: 1–7, 1–3, 6–5, 3–6			Dongan Lake Sports Park, Chengdu

15 September 2024; 11:00	Report	Croatia	26–4	South Africa	Dongan Lake Sports Park, Chengdu
15 September 2024; 11:00	Report	Score by quarters: 2–0, 8–1, 7–1, 9–2			Dongan Lake Sports Park, Chengdu

17 September 2024; 9:00	Report	Croatia	18–7	Thailand	Dongan Lake Sports Park, Chengdu
17 September 2024; 9:00	Report	Score by quarters: 3–3, 4–3, 5–0, 6–1			Dongan Lake Sports Park, Chengdu

17 September 2024; 10:30	Report	Canada	18–7	South Africa	Dongan Lake Sports Park, Chengdu
17 September 2024; 10:30	Report	Score by quarters: 5–1, 7–3, 1–1, 5–2			Dongan Lake Sports Park, Chengdu

18 September 2024; 9:00	Report	South Africa	11–14	Thailand	Dongan Lake Sports Park, Chengdu
18 September 2024; 9:00	Report	Score by quarters: 1–3, 3–2, 2–5, 5–4			Dongan Lake Sports Park, Chengdu

18 September 2024; 10:30	Report	Canada	12–20	Croatia	Dongan Lake Sports Park, Chengdu
18 September 2024; 10:30	Report	Score by quarters: 3–5, 5–6, 1–7, 3–2			Dongan Lake Sports Park, Chengdu

==== Group D ====
Pos	Team	Pld	W	PSW	PSL	L	GF	GA	GD	Pts	Qualification
1	China	3	3	0	0	0	49	24	+25	9	Crossovers
2	Israel	3	2	0	0	1	39	26	+13	6	Crossovers
3	Turkey	3	1	0	0	2	34	38	−4	3	13th–16th place classification
4	Mexico	3	0	0	0	3	20	54	−34	0	13th–16th place classification

Source: World Aquatics

15 September 2024; 12:30	Report	Turkey	8–13	Israel	Dongan Lake Sports Park, Chengdu
15 September 2024; 12:30	Report	Score by quarters: 1–2, 3–2, 2–5, 2–4			Dongan Lake Sports Park, Chengdu

15 September 2024; 14:30	Report	China	22–4	Mexico	Dongan Lake Sports Park, Chengdu
15 September 2024; 14:30	Report	Score by quarters: 6–0, 5–2, 3–1, 8–1			Dongan Lake Sports Park, Chengdu

17 September 2024; 12:00	Report	Mexico	7–16	Israel	Dongan Lake Sports Park, Chengdu
17 September 2024; 12:00	Report	Score by quarters: 0–4, 3–3, 3–5, 1–4			Dongan Lake Sports Park, Chengdu

17 September 2024; 19:00	Report	Turkey	10–16	China	Dongan Lake Sports Park, Chengdu
17 September 2024; 19:00	Report	Score by quarters: 1–3, 4–5, 1–5, 4–3			Dongan Lake Sports Park, Chengdu

18 September 2024; 12:00	Report	Mexico	9–16	Turkey	Dongan Lake Sports Park, Chengdu
18 September 2024; 12:00	Report	Score by quarters: 2–4, 0–3, 5–3, 2–6			Dongan Lake Sports Park, Chengdu

18 September 2024; 19:00	Report	Israel	10–11	China	Dongan Lake Sports Park, Chengdu
18 September 2024; 19:00	Report	Score by quarters: 3–0, 2–4, 1–5, 4–2			Dongan Lake Sports Park, Chengdu

== 13th–16th place classification ==
Pos	Team	Pld	W	PSW	PSL	L	GF	GA	GD	Pts
13	Thailand	3	2	1	0	0	55	49	+6	8
14	South Africa	3	1	1	1	0	41	40	+1	6
15	Turkey	3	1	0	1	1	39	34	+5	4
16	Mexico	3	0	0	0	3	32	44	−12	0

Source: World Aquatics

19 September 2024; 13:00	Report	Thailand	20–15	Mexico	Dongan Lake Sports Park, Chengdu
19 September 2024; 13:00	Report	Score by quarters: 4–4, 5–2, 5–5, 6–4			Dongan Lake Sports Park, Chengdu

19 September 2024; 14:30	Report	Turkey	13–15 (PSO)	South Africa	Dongan Lake Sports Park, Chengdu
19 September 2024; 14:30	Report	Score by quarters: 4–3, 1–2, 3–2, 3–4 PSO: 2–4			Dongan Lake Sports Park, Chengdu

20 September 2024; 12:00	Report	Mexico	13–14	South Africa	Dongan Lake Sports Park, Chengdu
20 September 2024; 12:00	Report	Score by quarters: 4–3, 2–5, 4–1, 3–5			Dongan Lake Sports Park, Chengdu

20 September 2024; 13:30	Report	Thailand	19–18	Turkey	Dongan Lake Sports Park, Chengdu
20 September 2024; 13:30	Report	Score by quarters: 4–3, 6–5, 6–5, 3–5			Dongan Lake Sports Park, Chengdu

21 September 2024; 9:00	Report	Mexico	4–10	Turkey	Dongan Lake Sports Park, Chengdu
21 September 2024; 9:00	Report	Score by quarters: 1–2, 2–3, 0–2, 1–3			Dongan Lake Sports Park, Chengdu

21 September 2024; 10:30	Report	Thailand	21–20 (PSO)	South Africa	Dongan Lake Sports Park, Chengdu
21 September 2024; 10:30	Report	Score by quarters: 2–5, 6–3, 4–5, 4–3 PSO: 5–4			Dongan Lake Sports Park, Chengdu

== Knockout stage ==
=== Brackets ===
==== Main bracket ====
Crossovers
19 September
Netherlands	11
Croatia	7
19 September
Australia	12
Israel	10
19 September
New Zealand	11
China	8
19 September
Italy	14
Canada	8

Quarterfinals
20 September
Netherlands	10
United States	11
20 September
Australia	3
Greece	16
20 September
New Zealand	5
Spain	16
20 September
Italy	11
Hungary	12

Semifinals
21 September
United States	8
Greece	13
21 September
Spain	10
Hungary	7

Final
22 September
Greece	9
Spain	11
Third place game
22 September
United States	13
Hungary	14

==== 5th place bracket ====
5th–8th place semifinals
21 September
Netherlands	8
Australia	10
21 September
New Zealand	6
Italy	10

Fifth place game
22 September
Australia	11
Italy	10
Seventh place game
22 September
Netherlands	10
New Zealand	7

==== 9th place bracket ====
9th–12th place semifinals
20 September
Croatia	18
Israel	9
20 September
China	10
Canada	4

Ninth place game
21 September
Croatia	11
China	22
Eleventh place game
21 September
Israel	14
Canada	11

=== Crossovers ===
19 September 2024; 10:00	Report	Italy	14–8	Canada	Dongan Lake Sports Park, Chengdu
19 September 2024; 10:00	Report	Score by quarters: 5–3, 4–1, 2–2, 3–2			Dongan Lake Sports Park, Chengdu

19 September 2024; 11:30	Report	Netherlands	11–7	Croatia	Dongan Lake Sports Park, Chengdu
19 September 2024; 11:30	Report	Score by quarters: 4–1, 1–2, 4–2, 2–2			Dongan Lake Sports Park, Chengdu

19 September 2024; 17:00	Report	Australia	12–10	Israel	Dongan Lake Sports Park, Chengdu
19 September 2024; 17:00	Report	Score by quarters: 2–3, 5–2, 3–2, 2–3			Dongan Lake Sports Park, Chengdu

19 September 2024; 18:30	Report	New Zealand	11–8	China	Dongan Lake Sports Park, Chengdu
19 September 2024; 18:30	Report	Score by quarters: 3–2, 1–2, 2–1, 5–3			Dongan Lake Sports Park, Chengdu

=== 9th–12th place semifinals ===
20 September 2024; 9:00	Report	Croatia	18–9	Israel	Dongan Lake Sports Park, Chengdu
20 September 2024; 9:00	Report	Score by quarters: 5–2, 3–0, 6–3, 4–4			Dongan Lake Sports Park, Chengdu

20 September 2024; 19:00	Report	China	10–4	Canada	Dongan Lake Sports Park, Chengdu
20 September 2024; 19:00	Report	Score by quarters: 0–1, 4–0, 4–2, 2–1			Dongan Lake Sports Park, Chengdu

==== Eleventh place game ====
21 September 2024; 12:00	Report	Israel	14–11	Canada	Dongan Lake Sports Park, Chengdu
21 September 2024; 12:00	Report	Score by quarters: 2–3, 4–3, 2–3, 6–2			Dongan Lake Sports Park, Chengdu

==== Ninth place game ====
21 September 2024; 13:30	Report	Croatia	11–22	China	Dongan Lake Sports Park, Chengdu
21 September 2024; 13:30	Report	Score by quarters: 1–5, 4–6, 3–7, 3–4			Dongan Lake Sports Park, Chengdu

=== Quarterfinals ===
20 September 2024; 13:30	Report	Netherlands	10–11	United States	Dongan Lake Sports Park, Chengdu
20 September 2024; 13:30	Report	Score by quarters: 2–2, 3–3, 2–3, 3–3			Dongan Lake Sports Park, Chengdu

20 September 2024; 16:00	Report	New Zealand	5–16	Spain	Dongan Lake Sports Park, Chengdu
20 September 2024; 16:00	Report	Score by quarters: 2–5, 0–2, 2–3, 1–6			Dongan Lake Sports Park, Chengdu

20 September 2024; 17:30	Report	Australia	3–16	Greece	Dongan Lake Sports Park, Chengdu
20 September 2024; 17:30	Report	Score by quarters: 0–3, 1–5, 1–3, 1–5			Dongan Lake Sports Park, Chengdu

20 September 2024; 20:30	Report	Italy	11–12	Hungary	Dongan Lake Sports Park, Chengdu
20 September 2024; 20:30	Report	Score by quarters: 1–1, 4–4, 4–4, 2–3			Dongan Lake Sports Park, Chengdu

=== 5th–8th place semifinals ===
21 September 2024; 16:00	Report	Netherlands	8–10	Australia	Dongan Lake Sports Park, Chengdu
21 September 2024; 16:00	Report	Score by quarters: 2–3, 2–2, 2–1, 2–4			Dongan Lake Sports Park, Chengdu

21 September 2024; 17:30	Report	New Zealand	6–10	Italy	Dongan Lake Sports Park, Chengdu
21 September 2024; 17:30	Report	Score by quarters: 1–1, 2–3, 1–2, 2–4			Dongan Lake Sports Park, Chengdu

==== Seventh place game ====
22 September 2024; 10:00	Report	Netherlands	10–7	New Zealand	Dongan Lake Sports Park, Chengdu
22 September 2024; 10:00	Report	Score by quarters: 3–3, 1–2, 4–2, 2–0			Dongan Lake Sports Park, Chengdu

==== Fifth place game ====
22 September 2024; 11:30	Report	Australia	11–10	Italy	Dongan Lake Sports Park, Chengdu
22 September 2024; 11:30	Report	Score by quarters: 3–2, 4–4, 3–1, 1–3			Dongan Lake Sports Park, Chengdu

=== Semifinals ===
21 September 2024; 19:00	Report	United States	8–13	Greece	Dongan Lake Sports Park, Chengdu
21 September 2024; 19:00	Report	Score by quarters: 2–5, 4–1, 2–3, 0–4			Dongan Lake Sports Park, Chengdu

21 September 2024; 20:30	Report	Spain	10–7	Hungary	Dongan Lake Sports Park, Chengdu
21 September 2024; 20:30	Report	Score by quarters: 2–3, 3–2, 3–1, 2–1			Dongan Lake Sports Park, Chengdu

==== Third place game ====
22 September 2024; 13:00	Report	United States	13–14	Hungary	Dongan Lake Sports Park, Chengdu
22 September 2024; 13:00	Report	Score by quarters: 3–3, 4–2, 2–6, 4–3			Dongan Lake Sports Park, Chengdu

==== Final ====
22 September 2024; 15:00	Report	Greece	9–11	Spain	Dongan Lake Sports Park, Chengdu
22 September 2024; 15:00	Report	Score by quarters: 2–2, 2–3, 2–4, 3–2			Dongan Lake Sports Park, Chengdu

== Final standings ==
Rank	Team
1st place, gold medalist(s)	Spain
2nd place, silver medalist(s)	Greece
3rd place, bronze medalist(s)	Hungary
4	United States
5	Australia
6	Italy
7	Netherlands
8	New Zealand
9	China
10	Croatia
11	Israel
12	Canada
13	Thailand
14	South Africa
15	Turkey
16	Mexico
