= World Aquatics U18 Water Polo Championships =

International youth water polo competition

- Sport: Water polo
- Founded: 2012
- Organizing body: World Aquatics
- Continent: All (International)
- Most recent champions: Men: Croatia (2nd title); Women: Australia (1st title)
- Most titles: Men: Hungary (3 titles); Women: Spain; United States (2 titles each)

The World Aquatics U18 Water Polo Championships, formerly known as the FINA World Youth Water Polo Championships, is an international water polo tournament held every two years for the players under the age of 18. It was launched by FINA in 2012.

== Editions ==
=== Men ===
Ed.	Year	Host	(gold) Gold	(silver) Silver	(bronze) Bronze
1	2012	Perth, Australia	Italy	Hungary	Serbia
2	2014	Istanbul, Turkey	Hungary	Spain	Russia
3	2016	Podgorica, Montenegro	Croatia	Montenegro	Hungary
4	2018	Szombathely, Hungary	Greece	Spain	Hungary
5	2022	Belgrade, Serbia	Hungary	Serbia	Spain
6	2024	Buenos Aires, Argentina	Hungary	Serbia	Montenegro
7	2026	Rio Maior, Portugal	Croatia	United States	Spain

=== Women ===
Ed.	Year	Host	(gold) Gold	(silver) Silver	(bronze) Bronze
1	2012	Perth, Australia	Greece	Hungary	Russia
2	2014	Madrid, Spain	United States	Canada	Hungary
3	2016	Auckland, New Zealand	Russia	Spain	Italy
4	2018	Belgrade, Serbia	Spain	Italy	Greece
5	2022	Belgrade, Serbia	United States	Greece	Hungary
6	2024	Chengdu, China	Spain	Greece	Hungary
7	2026	Puerto de la Cruz, Spain	Australia	Spain	United States

== Medals ==
=== Men ===
Rank	Nation	Gold	Silver	Bronze	Total
1	Hungary	3	1	2	6
2	Croatia	2	0	0	2
3	Greece	1	0	0	1
3	Italy	1	0	0	1
5	Spain	0	2	2	4
6	Serbia	0	2	1	3
7	Montenegro	0	1	1	2
8	United States	0	1	0	1
9	Russia	0	0	1	1
Totals (9 entries)		7	7	7	21

=== Women ===
Rank	Nation	Gold	Silver	Bronze	Total
1	Spain	2	2	0	4
2	United States	2	0	1	3
3	Greece	1	2	1	4
4	Russia	1	0	1	2
5	Australia	1	0	0	1
6	Hungary	0	1	3	4
7	Italy	0	1	1	2
8	Canada	0	1	0	1
Totals (8 entries)		7	7	7	21

== See also ==
- World Aquatics U16 Water Polo Championships
- World Aquatics U20 Water Polo Championships
