= 2026 World Aquatics Water Polo 4x4 Open Championships – Women's tournament =

Tournament details
- Host country: Croatia
- Venue: 1 (in 1 host city)
- Dates: 31 August – 6 September
- Teams: 8

Final positions
- Champions: United States (1st title)
- Runners-up: Spain
- Third place: Russia
- Fourth place: Australia

Awards
- Best player: (United States) Ryann Neushul
- Best goalkeeper: (Spain) Mariona Terre

The 2026 World Aquatics Water Polo 4x4 Open Championships – Women's tournament was the first edition of the World Aquatics Water Polo 4x4 Open Championships. It was held from 31 August to 6 September 2026 in Dubrovnik, Croatia.

The United States won the first ever title, after defeated Spain 3–0 in final.

== Results ==
=== Round robin ===
Pos	Team	Pld	W	PSW	PSL	L	GF	GA	GD	Pts	Qualification
1	United States	4	4	0	0	0	12	0	12	12	Quarterfinals
2	Spain	4	3	0	0	1	9	3	6	9	Quarterfinals
3	Russia	4	3	0	0	1	9	3	6	9	Quarterfinals
4	Australia	4	3	0	0	1	9	4	5	9	Quarterfinals
5	Croatia	4	2	1	0	1	9	5	4	8	Quarterfinals
6	Greece	4	0	0	1	3	3	12	−9	1	Quarterfinals
7	Turkey	4	0	0	0	4	0	12	−12	0	Quarterfinals
8	South Africa	4	0	0	0	4	0	12	−12	0	Quarterfinals

Rules for classification: 1) Points; 2) Strength of opposition; 3) Head-to-head points; 4) Head-to-head goal difference; 5) Head-to-head goals scored; 6) Goal difference.

=== Bracket ===
Quarter-finals
4 September
United States	3
South Africa	0
5 September
Australia (PSO)	3
Croatia	2
4 September
Spain	3
Turkey	0
4 September
Russia	3
Greece	0

Semi-finals
6 September
United States	3
Australia	0
6 September
Spain	3
Russia	0

Final
6 September
United States	3
Spain	0
Third place
6 September
Australia	0
Russia	3

=== Quarterfinals ===
4 September 2026; 20:40	Report	United States	3–0	South Africa	Dubrovnik, Croatia
4 September 2026; 20:40	Report	Score by quarters: 8–0, 9–0, 5–0, –			Dubrovnik, Croatia

4 September 2026; 21:30	Report	Spain	3–0	Turkey	Dubrovnik, Croatia
4 September 2026; 21:30	Report	Score by quarters: 5–2, 5–0, 4–3, –			Dubrovnik, Croatia

4 September 2026; 22:20	Report	Russia	3–0	Greece	Dubrovnik, Croatia
4 September 2026; 22:20	Report	Score by quarters: 5–0, 7–3, 7–1, –			Dubrovnik, Croatia

5 September 2026; 00:50	Report	Australia	3–2 (PSO)	Croatia	Dubrovnik, Croatia
5 September 2026; 00:50	Report	Score by quarters: 3–2, 2–3, 3–2, 1–2 PSO: 4–3			Dubrovnik, Croatia

=== 5–8th place classification ===
5 September 2026; 20:40	Report	Turkey	3–0	Greece	Dubrovnik, Croatia
5 September 2026; 20:40	Report	Score by quarters: 1–0, 3–2, 5–3, –			Dubrovnik, Croatia

5 September 2026; 23:10	Report	South Africa	0–3	Croatia	Dubrovnik, Croatia
5 September 2026; 23:10	Report	Score by quarters: 1–7, 0–6, 0–6, –			Dubrovnik, Croatia

=== Seventh place game ===
6 September 2026; 17:50	Report	South Africa	0–3	Greece	Dubrovnik, Croatia
6 September 2026; 17:50	Report	Score by quarters: 1–6, 2–6, 3–6, –			Dubrovnik, Croatia

=== Fifth place game ===
6 September 2026; 19:30	Report	Croatia	3–1	Turkey	Dubrovnik, Croatia
6 September 2026; 19:30	Report	Score by quarters: 3–1, 4–3, 2–3, 4–2			Dubrovnik, Croatia

=== Semifinals ===
6 September 2026; 00:00	Report	United States	3–0	Australia	Dubrovnik, Croatia
6 September 2026; 00:00	Report	Score by quarters: 4–3, 5–0, 7–1, –			Dubrovnik, Croatia

6 September 2026; 00:50	Report	Spain	3–0	Russia	Dubrovnik, Croatia
6 September 2026; 00:50	Report	Score by quarters: 3–2, 2–1, 3–1, –			Dubrovnik, Croatia

=== Third place game ===
6 September 2026; 21:15	Report	Australia	0–3	Russia	Dubrovnik, Croatia
6 September 2026; 21:15	Report	Score by quarters: 3–4, 1–5, 3–6, –			Dubrovnik, Croatia

=== Final ===
6 September 2026; 23:15	Report	United States	3–0	Spain	Dubrovnik, Croatia
6 September 2026; 23:15	Report	Score by quarters: 4–1, 4–3, 2–0, –			Dubrovnik, Croatia

== Final standing ==
Rank	Team
1st place, gold medalist(s)	United States
2nd place, silver medalist(s)	Spain
3rd place, bronze medalist(s)	Russia
4	Australia
5	Croatia
6	Turkey
7	Greece
8	South Africa
