= 2014 FINA World Women's Youth Water Polo Championships =

Youth women's water polo tournament

Tournament details
- Host country: Spain
- City: Madrid
- Venue: 1 (in 1 host city)
- Dates: 25–31 August 2014
- Teams: 16 (from 5 confederations)

Final positions
- Champions: United States (1st title)
- Runners-up: Canada
- Third place: Hungary
- Fourth place: Greece

The 2014 FINA World Women's Youth Water Polo Championships was the 2nd edition of the U18 women's water polo world championship. The tournament was played in Madrid, Spain, from 25 to 31 August 2014.

== Format ==
The 16 participating teams were drawn into four groups of four, which were played in a round-robin format. The group winners advanced automatically to the quarterfinals; the second- and the third-placed teams advanced to the qualification for quarterfinals; the fourth-placed teams advanced to the 13th–16th place classification.

== Group stage ==
=== Group A ===
| Pos | Team | Pld | W | D | L | GF | GA | GD | Pts | Qualification |
|---|---|---|---|---|---|---|---|---|---|---|
| 1 | United States | 3 | 3 | 0 | 0 | 58 | 17 | +41 | 6 | Quarterfinals |
| 2 | Hungary | 3 | 2 | 0 | 1 | 55 | 20 | +35 | 4 | Eighthfinals |
| 3 | South Africa | 3 | 1 | 0 | 2 | 14 | 50 | −36 | 2 | Eighthfinals |
| 4 | Germany | 3 | 0 | 0 | 3 | 13 | 53 | −40 | 0 | 13th–16th place classification |

Source: World Aquatics

| Report | South Africa | 7–5 | Germany |
| Report | Score by quarters: 0–0, 3–4, 3–1, 1–0 |

| Report | United States | 14–9 | Hungary |
| Report | Score by quarters: 3–2, 6–3, 2–3, 3–1 |

| Report | Hungary | 22–3 | Germany |
| Report | Score by quarters: 6–1, 3–1, 4–0, 9–1 |

| Report | South Africa | 4–20 | United States |
| Report | Score by quarters: 2–6, 1–3, 1–4, 0–7 |

| Report | South Africa | 3–24 | Hungary |
| Report | Score by quarters: 0–6, 0–4, 2–6, 1–8 |

| Report | United States | 24–4 | Germany |
| Report | Score by quarters: 4–1, 7–1, 5–0, 8–2 |

=== Group B ===
| Pos | Team | Pld | W | D | L | GF | GA | GD | Pts | Qualification |
|---|---|---|---|---|---|---|---|---|---|---|
| 1 | Greece | 3 | 2 | 1 | 0 | 47 | 16 | +31 | 5 | Quarterfinals |
| 2 | Italy | 3 | 2 | 1 | 0 | 37 | 26 | +11 | 5 | Eighthfinals |
| 3 | Japan | 3 | 1 | 0 | 2 | 23 | 33 | −10 | 2 | Eighthfinals |
| 4 | Brazil | 3 | 0 | 0 | 3 | 16 | 48 | −32 | 0 | 13th–16th place classification |

Source: World Aquatics

| Report | Brazil | 4–11 | Japan |
| Report | Score by quarters: 1–2, 1–1, 2–4, 0–4 |

| Report | Greece | 9–9 | Italy |
| Report | Score by quarters: 2–3, 1–3, 4–1, 2–2 |

| Report | Italy | 13–9 | Japan |
| Report | Score by quarters: 3–2, 3–2, 2–4, 5–1 |

| Report | Brazil | 4–22 | Greece |
| Report | Score by quarters: 3–6, 0–3, 1–6, 0–7 |

| Report | Brazil | 8–15 | Italy |
| Report | Score by quarters: 1–3, 4–4, 1–3, 2–5 |

| Report | Greece | 16–3 | Japan |
| Report | Score by quarters: 4–1, 5–1, 4–1, 3–0 |

=== Group C ===
| Pos | Team | Pld | W | D | L | GF | GA | GD | Pts | Qualification |
|---|---|---|---|---|---|---|---|---|---|---|
| 1 | Spain | 3 | 2 | 1 | 0 | 48 | 14 | +34 | 5 | Quarterfinals |
| 2 | Netherlands | 3 | 2 | 1 | 0 | 52 | 19 | +33 | 5 | Eighthfinals |
| 3 | China | 3 | 1 | 0 | 2 | 36 | 48 | −12 | 2 | Eighthfinals |
| 4 | Puerto Rico | 3 | 0 | 0 | 3 | 18 | 73 | −55 | 0 | 13th–16th place classification |

Source: World Aquatics

| Report | Puerto Rico | 4–26 | Spain |
| Report | Score by quarters: 1–6, 2–9, 0–6, 1–5 |

| Report | China | 10–21 | Netherlands |
| Report | Score by quarters: 0–2, 6–6, 2–7, 2–6 |

| Report | Netherlands | 6–6 | Spain |
| Report | Score by quarters: 2–4, 2–1, 1–0, 1–1 |

| Report | Puerto Rico | 11–22 | China |
| Report | Score by quarters: 3–7, 2–10, 2–1, 4–4 |

| Report | Puerto Rico | 3–25 | Netherlands |
| Report | Score by quarters: 1–5, 0–6, 1–6, 1–8 |

| Report | China | 4–16 | Spain |
| Report | Score by quarters: 1–4, 2–5, 1–5, 0–2 |

=== Group D ===
| Pos | Team | Pld | W | D | L | GF | GA | GD | Pts | Qualification |
|---|---|---|---|---|---|---|---|---|---|---|
| 1 | Canada | 3 | 3 | 0 | 0 | 35 | 18 | +17 | 6 | Quarterfinals |
| 2 | Russia | 3 | 2 | 0 | 1 | 33 | 27 | +6 | 4 | Eighthfinals |
| 3 | Australia | 3 | 1 | 0 | 2 | 29 | 24 | +5 | 2 | Eighthfinals |
| 4 | New Zealand | 3 | 0 | 0 | 3 | 20 | 48 | −28 | 0 | 13th–16th place classification |

Source: World Aquatics

| Report | Canada | 7–6 | Australia |
| Report | Score by quarters: 3–3, 3–1, 1–1, 0–1 |

| Report | New Zealand | 9–15 | Russia |
| Report | Score by quarters: 3–5, 1–1, 3–5, 2–4 |

| Report | Russia | 9–8 | Australia |
| Report | Score by quarters: 2–2, 2–2, 3–2, 2–2 |

| Report | Canada | 18–3 | New Zealand |
| Report | Score by quarters: 4–2, 6–0, 4–0, 4–1 |

| Report | Canada | 10–9 | Russia |
| Report | Score by quarters: 4–0, 1–3, 2–4, 3–2 |

| Report | New Zealand | 8–15 | Australia |
| Report | Score by quarters: 1–5, 4–3, 2–5, 1–2 |

== Knockout stage ==
=== Brackets ===
==== Main bracket ====
Playoffs
Netherlands | 13
Australia | 8
China | 10
Russia | 8
Hungary | 20
Japan | 14
South Africa | 8
Italy | 15

Quarterfinals
United States | 6
Netherlands | 4
Greece | 10
China | 5
Spain | 10
Hungary | 11
Canada | 8
Italy | 6

Semifinals
United States | 12
Greece | 11
Hungary | 9
Canada | 10

Final
United States | 5
Canada | 4
Third place game
Greece | 10
Hungary | 11

==== 5th place bracket ====
5th–8th place semifinals
Netherlands | 10
China | 6
Spain | 6
Italy | 10

Fifth place game
Netherlands | 8
Italy | 11
Seventh place game
China | 1
Spain | 7

==== 9th place bracket ====
9th–12th place semifinals
Japan | 13
Australia | 10
South Africa | 5
Russia | 17

Ninth place game
Japan | 8
Russia | 15
Eleventh place game
Australia | 14
South Africa | 4

==== 13th place bracket ====
13th–16th place semifinals
Germany | 5
Brazil | 7
Puerto Rico | 6
New Zealand | 13

Thirteenth place game
Brazil | 7
New Zealand | 10
Fifteenth place game
Germany | 5
Puerto Rico | 10

=== 13th–16th place semifinals ===
| Report | Germany | 5–7 | Brazil |
| Report | Score by quarters: 2–3, 1–2, 1–1, 1–1 |

| Report | Puerto Rico | 6–13 | New Zealand |
| Report | Score by quarters: 1–1, 2–1, 2–5, 1–6 |

==== Fifteenth place game ====
| Report | Germany | 5–10 | Puerto Rico |
| Report | Score by quarters: 0–1, 3–6, 1–3, 1–0 |

==== Thirteenth place game ====
| Report | Brazil | 7–10 | New Zealand |
| Report | Score by quarters: 2–3, 0–3, 3–1, 2–3 |

=== Playoffs ===
| Report | Hungary | 20–14 | Japan |
| Report | Score by quarters: 5–3, 5–3, 7–2, 3–6 |

| Report | South Africa | 8–15 | Italy |
| Report | Score by quarters: 3–4, 1–4, 2–4, 2–3 |

| Report | Netherlands | 13–8 | Australia |
| Report | Score by quarters: 2–3, 3–1, 3–1, 5–3 |

| Report | China | 10–8 | Russia |
| Report | Score by quarters: 2–1, 4–4, 2–2, 2–1 |

=== 9th–12th place semifinals ===
| Report | Japan | 13–10 | Australia |
| Report | Score by quarters: 1–2, 4–2, 4–2, 4–4 |

| Report | South Africa | 5–17 | Russia |
| Report | Score by quarters: 1–6, 1–4, 2–3, 1–4 |

==== Eleventh place game ====
| Report | Australia | 14–4 | South Africa |
| Report | Score by quarters: 2–2, 3–0, 4–0, 5–2 |

==== Ninth place game ====
| Report | Japan | 8–15 | Russia |
| Report | Score by quarters: 2–2, 3–4, 1–7, 2–2 |

=== Quarterfinals ===
| Report | United States | 6–4 | Netherlands |
| Report | Score by quarters: 1–0, 2–0, 2–1, 1–3 |

| Report | Greece | 10–5 | China |
| Report | Score by quarters: 3–1, 3–1, 2–1, 2–2 |

| Report | Spain | 10–11 | Hungary |
| Report | Score by quarters: 1–6, 2–2, 6–2, 1–1 |

| Report | Canada | 8–6 | Italy |
| Report | Score by quarters: 0–1, 2–2, 5–2, 1–1 |

=== 5th–8th place semifinals ===
| Report | Netherlands | 10–6 | China |
| Report | Score by quarters: 4–2, 1–1, 2–2, 3–1 |

| Report | Spain | 6–10 | Italy |
| Report | Score by quarters: 1–1, 2–5, 1–3, 2–1 |

==== Seventh place game ====
| Report | China | 1–7 | Spain |
| Report | Score by quarters: 0–2, 1–2, 0–1, 0–2 |

==== Fifth place game ====
| Report | Netherlands | 8–11 | Italy |
| Report | Score by quarters: 2–2, 2–3, 1–3, 3–3 |

=== Semifinals ===
| Report | United States | 12–11 (PSO) | Greece |
| Report | Score by quarters: 2–5, 4–0, 0–3, 3–1 PSO: 3–2 |

| Report | Hungary | 9–10 | Canada |
| Report | Score by quarters: 0–5, 3–1, 4–3, 2–1 |

==== Third place game ====
| Report | Greece | 10–11 (PSO) | Hungary |
| Report | Score by quarters: 4–0, 2–5, 0–1, 1–1 PSO: 3–4 |

==== Final ====
| Report | United States | 5–4 | Canada |
| Report | Score by quarters: 2–0, 1–2, 1–1, 1–1 |

== Final standings ==
| Rank | Team |
|---|---|
| 1st place, gold medalist(s) | United States |
| 2nd place, silver medalist(s) | Canada |
| 3rd place, bronze medalist(s) | Hungary |
| 4 | Greece |
| 5 | Italy |
| 6 | Netherlands |
| 7 | Spain |
| 8 | China |
| 9 | Russia |
| 10 | Japan |
| 11 | Australia |
| 12 | South Africa |
| 13 | New Zealand |
| 14 | Brazil |
| 15 | Puerto Rico |
| 16 | Germany |
