= USA Water Polo =

Governing body for water polo

- Sport: Water polo
- Jurisdiction: National
- Founded: 1978
- Affiliation: United States Aquatic Sports
- Headquarters: Irvine, California, U.S.
- Location: 6 Morgan
- Director: Christopher Ramsey
- Men's coach: Dejan Udovičić
- Women's coach: Adam Krikorian

Official website
- usawaterpolo.org
- (United States)

USA Water Polo is the governing body for the sport of water polo in the United States and is a member of the United States Aquatic Sports. USA Water Polo is responsible for fielding U.S. national teams and hosts 20 annual tournaments. The Organization is headquartered in Irvine, California.

== History ==
USA Water Polo was formed in 1978 after a new law designated the United States Olympic Committee as the governing body for all Olympic activity in the United States. Water polo in the United States had previously been controlled by the Amateur Athletic Union. The organization is now responsible for overall Olympic development.

The U.S. has fielded a women's national team since the 1970s. Tina Bejarano, Lara Ruiz, Carmen Bejarano, Debbie Powell, Desiree Zepeda and Anabel Barragon played on a team from Commerce, California during this era. The team has participated in every Olympic Games since the inaugural women's competition in the 2000 Summer Olympics in Sydney, and have medalled in all five tournaments, winning the last three.

== National teams ==
The United States men's team has participated in Olympic water polo since the 1904 Games in St. Louis, the second Olympic Games to host a water polo tournament. The 1904 squad won the gold medal, the only gold the US men have earned in water polo. Since 1904, the US has won another six Olympic medals (1924, 1932, 1972, 1984, 1988, 2008). The United States women's team has competed in every tournament since the inaugural 2000 edition, winning a medal in each, including three consecutive victories in 2012–2021.

USA Water Polo also oversees junior, 18U, and 16U national teams.

== Racial Equity & Reform Task Force ==
In June 2020, USA Water Polo announced it was forming a task force to work on racial justice issues as well as expanding access to the sport. Four-time olympic champion Brenda Villa was selected alongside executive John Abdou.

== Washington Wetskins ==
The Washington Wetskins, an organization affiliated with USA Water Polo, is the oldest LGBT friendly water polo team in the United States and the world. The Washington Wetskins welcomed women as well as men on their team. As of 2018, the organization had over 80 members. In 2020, the team changed their name to the Washington DSeahorses Water Polo Club. DSeahorse members have to be USA Water Polo members in order to play on the team.

== Notable athletes ==
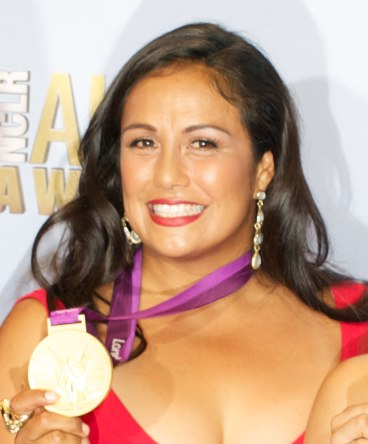
Brenda Villa, Olympic medal winner

- Tony Azevedo
- Tina Bejarano
- Ben Hallock
- Ashleigh Johnson
- Maddie Musselman
- Heather Petri
- Melissa Seidemann
- Jesse Smith
- Maggie Steffens
- Brenda Villa

== Controversy ==
In June 2021, USA Water Polo and a California club settled a $14 million lawsuit that had been filed against them by several female water polo players who accused their coach Bahram Hojreh of sexual misconduct. USA Water Polo stated it suspended the coach when it first obtained reports about his alleged abuse in January 2018 from the United States Center for SafeSport, but the organization was cautioned for allegedly failing to inform law enforcement at the time as required under California law and the SafeSport code.

== See also ==
- Water polo
- Water polo at the Summer Olympics
- USA Water Polo Hall of Fame
